= Vauxhall Astra =

Motor vehicle

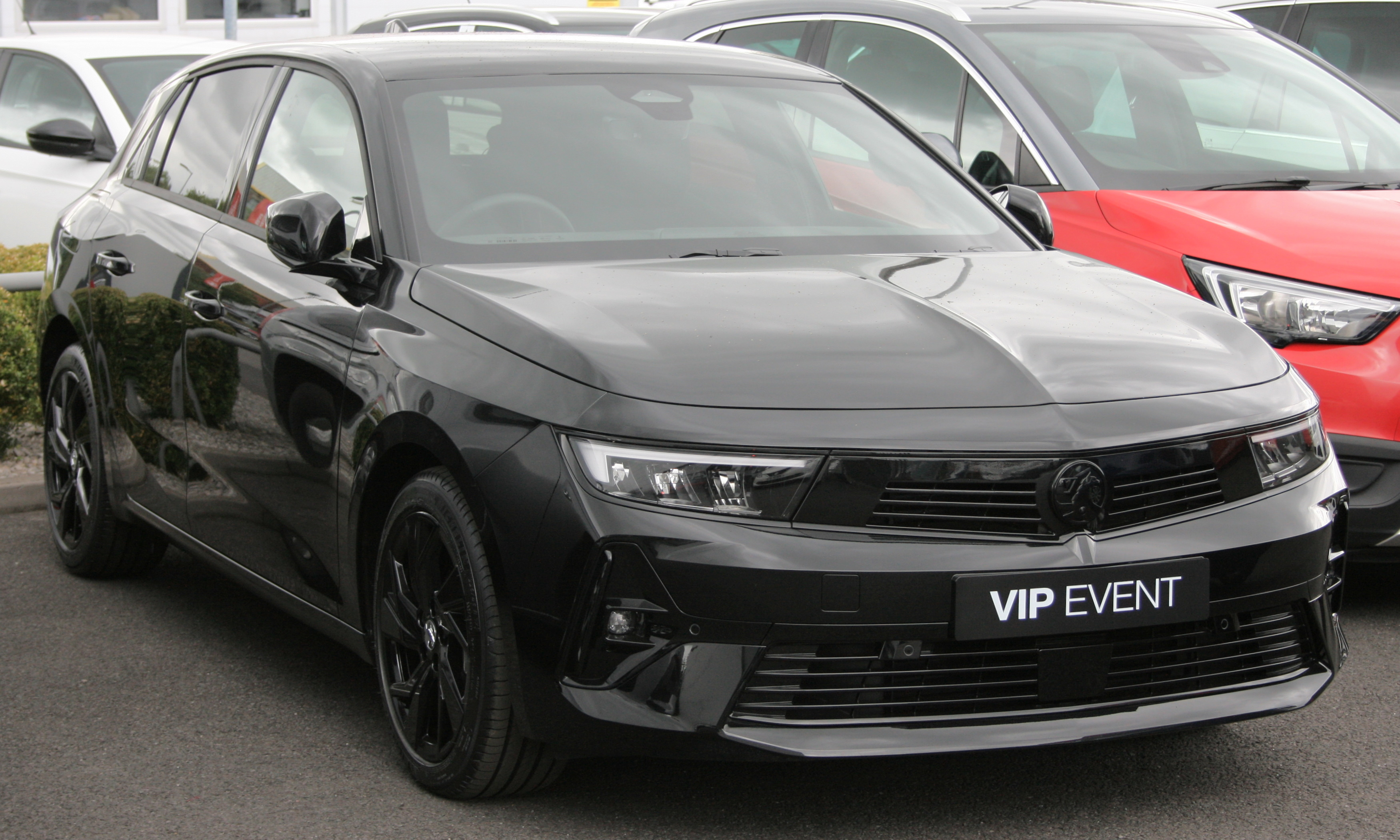

Overview
- Manufacturer: Vauxhall Motors Limited (Stellantis)
- Production: 1980–present
- Assembly: Bochum, Germany; Ellesmere Port, Cheshire, England, United Kingdom; Gliwice, Poland; Rüsselsheim, Germany

Body and chassis
- Class: Small family car (C)
- Body style: 3/5-door hatchback 4-door sedan/saloon 3/5-door estate 3-door panel van
- Layout: Front-engine, front-wheel drive

Chronology
- Predecessor: Vauxhall Viva; Vauxhall Chevette

The Vauxhall Astra is a compact car/small family car (C-segment) that has been sold by Vauxhall since 1980. Over its eight generations, it has been made at several GM/Opel/Stellantis plants around Europe; however, most versions have been sourced from Vauxhall's plant at Ellesmere Port, Cheshire, United Kingdom.

For its first two generations, the nameplate was applied to right-hand drive versions of the Opel Kadett for use in the UK. Since 1991, Opel has used the Astra nameplate on its B/C-platform. General Motors' Saturn division in the United States also offered a Belgian-built version of the Astra as a captive import from late 2007 until Saturn was discontinued following GM's 2010 bankruptcy.

== First generation (1980–1984) ==
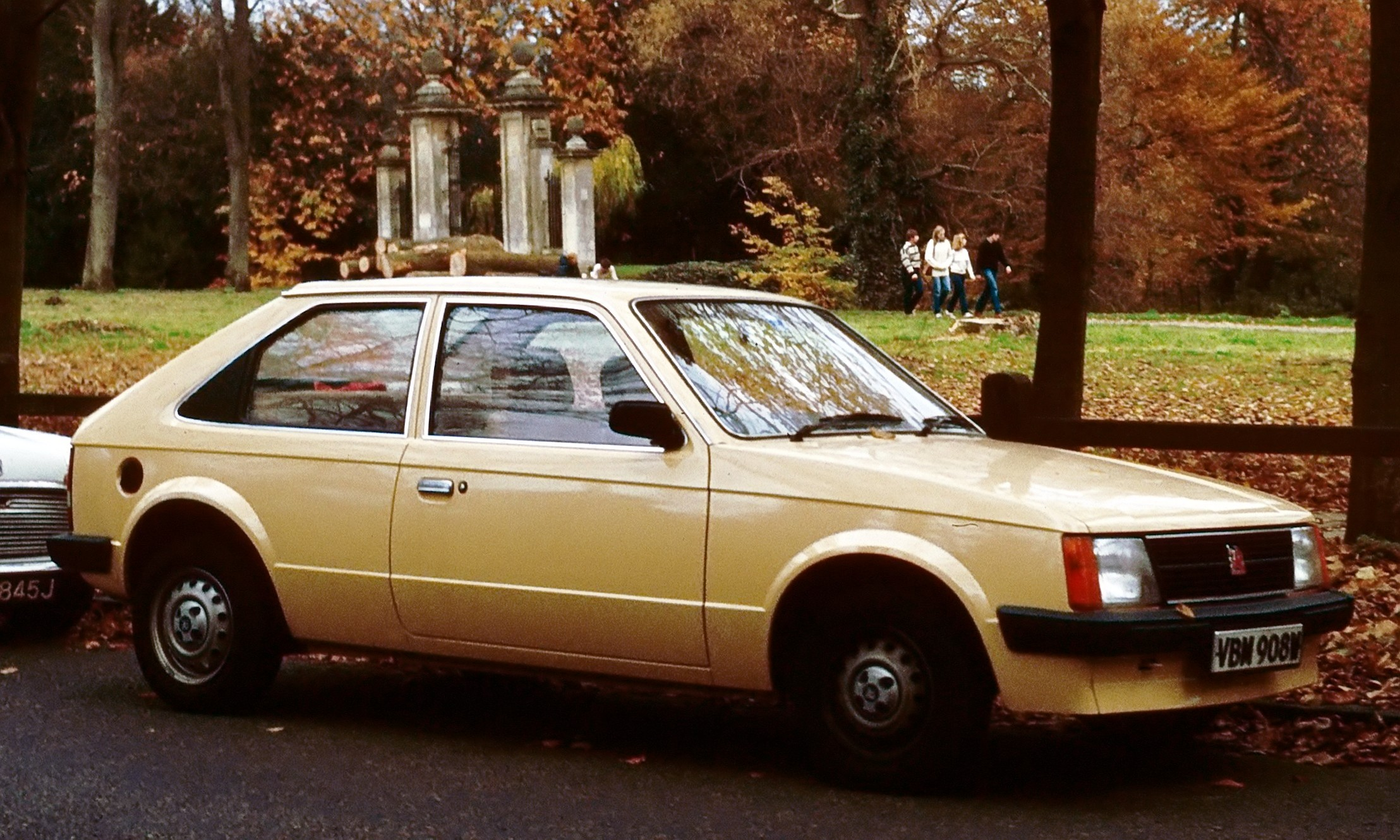
Vauxhall Astra Mark 1 2-door saloon

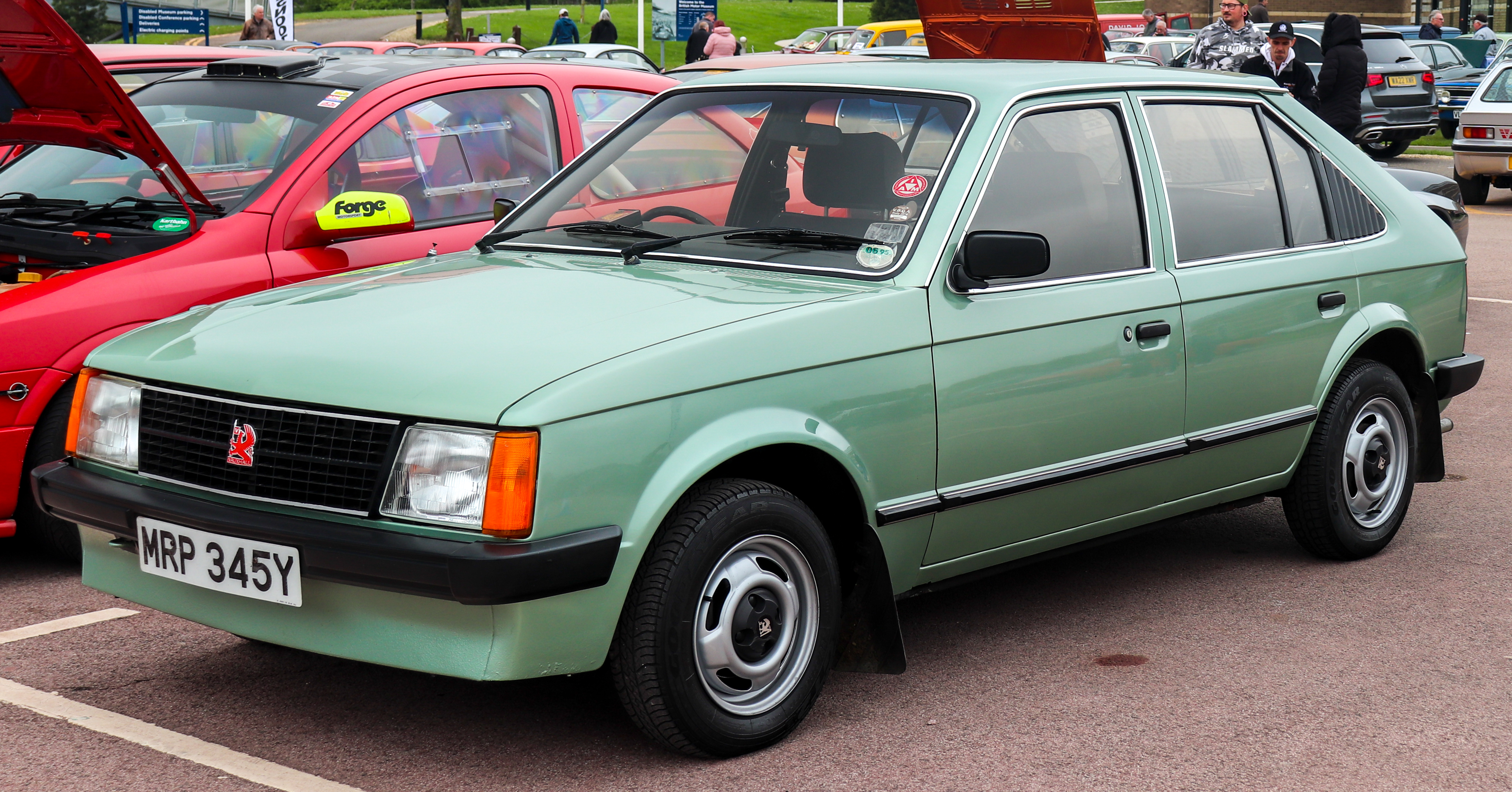

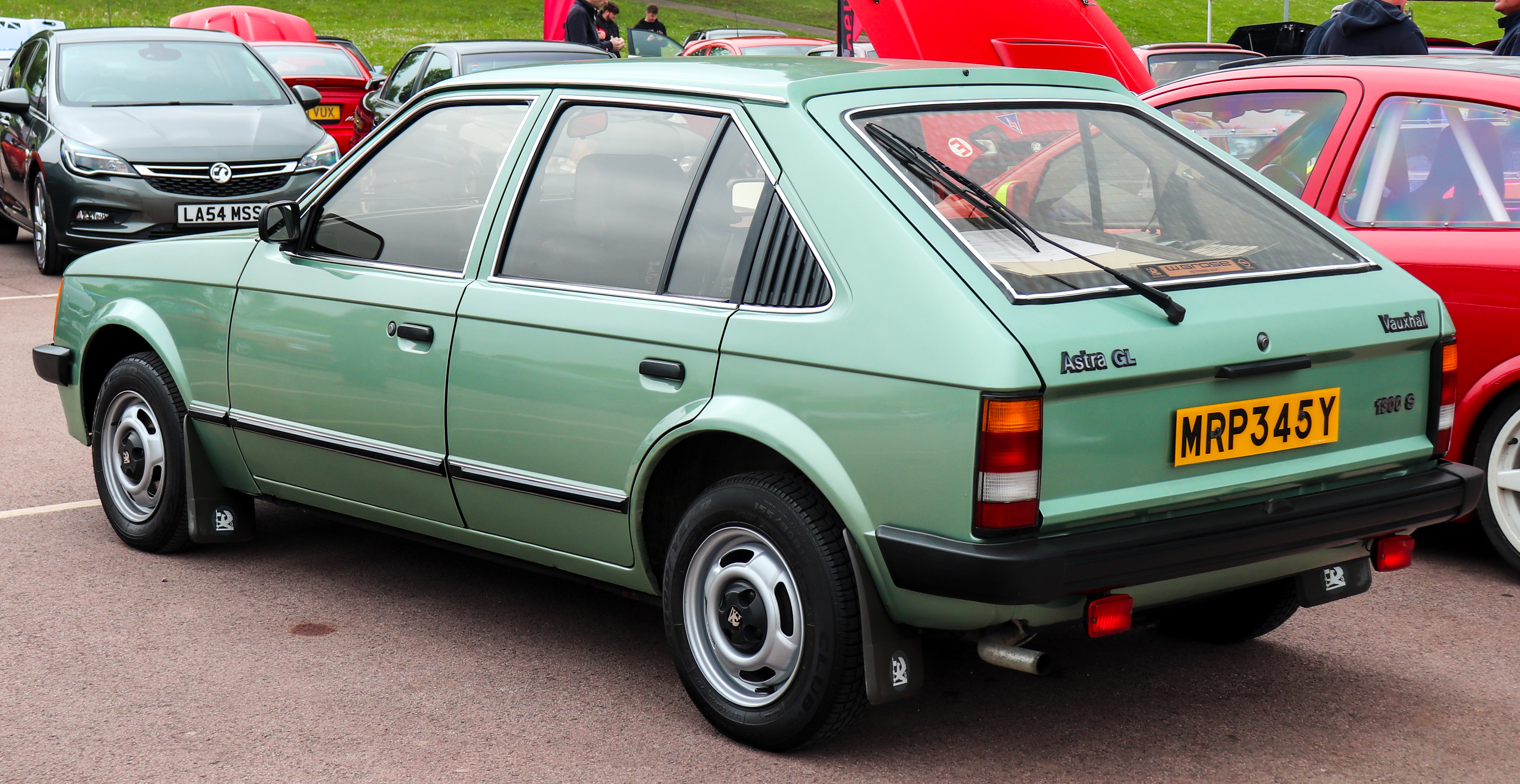
Vauxhall Astra Mark 1 5-door hatchback

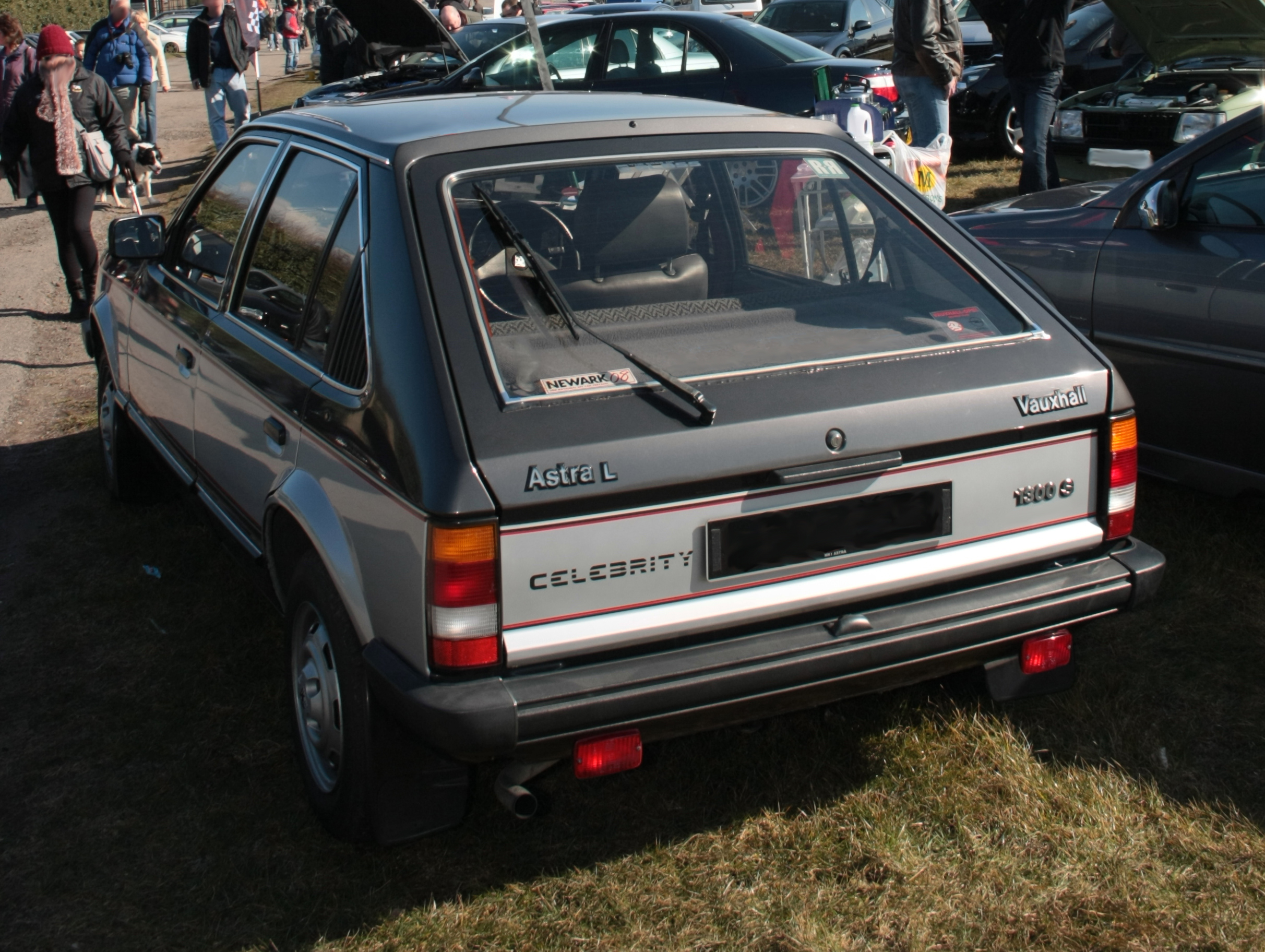
Vauxhall Astra 1300 Celebrity hatchback

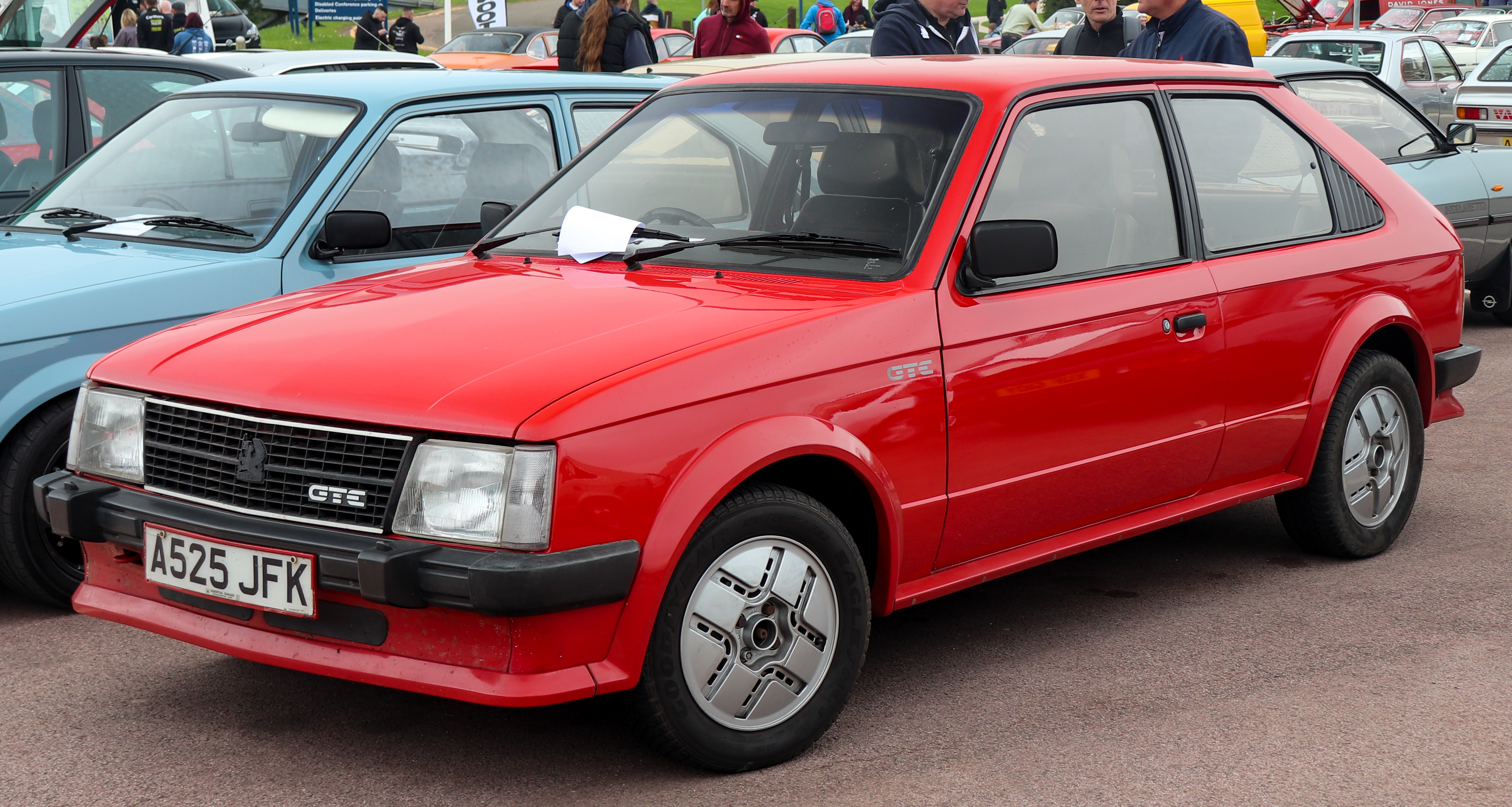
Vauxhall Astra GTE 1800

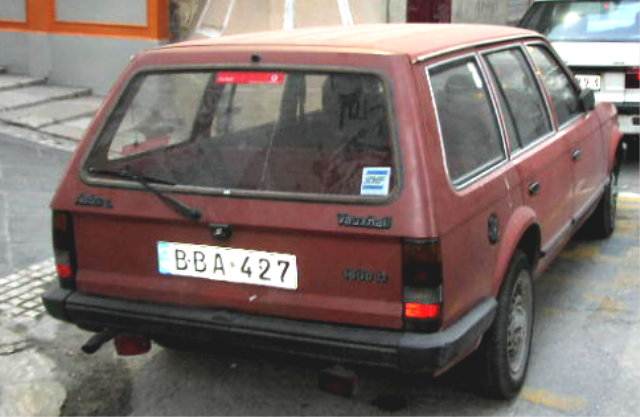
MkI Vauxhall Astra estate

The Astra name originated with the Vauxhall-badged version of the first front-wheel drive Opel Kadett, which had been launched in 1979 as the Opel Kadett D. This model, which went on sale in March 1980, replaced the Vauxhall Viva in the UK. The last rear-wheel drive Kadett had also formed the basis of the Vauxhall Chevette, which remained in production until 1984. The Astra was Vauxhall's first model to have front wheel drive. Initially, Vauxhall had worked on restyled versions of the Kadett D which would have featured the company's trademark "droopsnoot", as well as a conventional three-box saloon version that would have directly replaced the Viva, however budget constraints meant that General Motors cancelled their development, and the Astra was released differing only from its Opel sister car in badging and trim - setting the precedent for all Vauxhall models from that point on. Confusingly, in the British market both the Kadett and the Astra were sold through separate marketing operations, with overlapping lineups that competed directly with each other - Vauxhall had tried to mitigate against the overlap by initially only offering the Astra in a limited number of trim, engine and body combinations compared to the Opel Kadett; although this was due to the fact that until 1981, both cars were sourced solely from Opel's Bochum plant - with UK production at Ellesmere Port not starting until 16 November 1981.

By 1982 this anomaly had been sorted out as GM had begun to merge the previously separate Vauxhall and Opel dealer networks and the Opel Kadett lineup was limited to the well-equipped five-door Berlina (1.3S or 1.6S) and the sporty 1.6 SR, leaving most of the market to the Vauxhall Astra-badged cars. As the consolidation of Opel and Vauxhall dealerships was completed, the Opel badged versions were eventually phased out entirely.

Production began at Opel's West German plant at Bochum in August 1979, with British deliveries of the Opel Kadett commencing in November 1979, four months before the Vauxhall-badged versions were launched. Whilst the previous generation Kadett C had been discontinued, it effectively lived on in the form of its Vauxhall sister - the Chevette - which remained on sale partly to keep the Ellesmere Port plant in operation until Astra production started, and also to give an alternative option for conservative customers who remained suspicious of front wheel drive.

The overhead-camshaft engine (not 1200) was a huge leap forward from the earlier generation of small engines used in Vauxhall and Opel cars in terms of power, economy and refinement. It was initially available in 1300 and 1600 forms, and later an 1800 fuel-injected version was added, used in the Mk 1 Astra GTE model, introduced in 1983. This version of the Astra was an alternative to the Ford Escort XR3i, Volkswagen Golf GTI and Fiat Strada 130TC.

The car featured a new unified engine for Vauxhall/Opel, featuring an all-aluminium head, overhead camshaft and hydraulic valve lifters, and it quickly became popular with buyers. A 1200 cc version which used the older Opel OHV engine was also available.

There were three body styles for the first generation Astra: hatchback, saloon, and estate, all available with two or four side doors. Unlike the previous Opel T-Car, no coupé was offered although sketches of a mid-engined two-door model were developed. The saloons were styled exactly like the hatchbacks, except for a different rear window above a boot lid; from the side they looked almost indistinguishable from the hatchback, with no protruding notch at the rear. The saloon version was replaced by the Belmont saloon based on the Astra MK2 in early 1986.

The white 1800 GTE was the first UK car to be 'colour-coded' with body trim that matched the base colour of the car, this included wheel arch extensions, front side and rear lower skirts, mirror covers, bumpers and even the alloy wheels were painted white. The black, silver and red versions of the GTE also had colour-coding but had the more conventional black bumpers and silver painted alloy wheels.

There was also a van version which was badged as the Bedford Astra Van – the Bedford brand at that time being used for GM's commercial vehicles in Britain and a few continental European markets. Presented in October 1982, this version used the body of the three-door estate, with no rear seat and the rear side windows panelled in. The Astra Van replaced the Bedford Chevanne and was sold alongside the smaller, more utilitarian Bedford HA. The initial version was available in comprably well-equipped L trim only, with the 75 hp (55 kW) 1.3 S petrol engine standard fitment and an optional, 54 hp (40 kW) 1.6-litre diesel. Both engines were offered with a four-speed manual transmission or an optional, three-speed automatic. Payloads were 525 and 545 kg (1,157 and 1,202 lb) for the petrol and the diesel engine, respectively (manual transmission). The diesel represented about one third of sales. In September 1983, to fill the gap left by the recently discontinued HA Van and responding to customer criticism about pricing and excessively comfortable equipment, a more bare-bones "fleet" version was introduced. This was available with the diesel or with a lower compression, 59 bhp (44 kW) "1.3 N" petrol engine. At the same time, the Astra Van L also received two additional drivetrain options: a five-speed manual transmission and a 90 hp (66 kW) 1.6 S petrol engine.

Sales of this first Astra were strong, and gave Vauxhall a much-needed boost in the small family car sector after several years of declining sales with the Viva HC. It soon overtook the Austin Allegro as Britain's second most popular small family car, although it was still a long way behind the Ford Escort in terms of sales success.

The original Astra was awarded What Car?'s: 'Car of the Year' for 1980. However, it was pipped to the European Car of the Year award by the Lancia Delta.

Versions available were:

- 1200 E (2/4-door saloon, 3/5-door hatchback, 3/5-door estate)
- 1300 cc OHC
- 1600 cc OHC
- 1800 cc OHC
- 1600 cc OHC Diesel

Smaller engines received round headlights, while cars fitted with larger engines or better equipment have square headlights.

== Second generation (1984–1993) ==
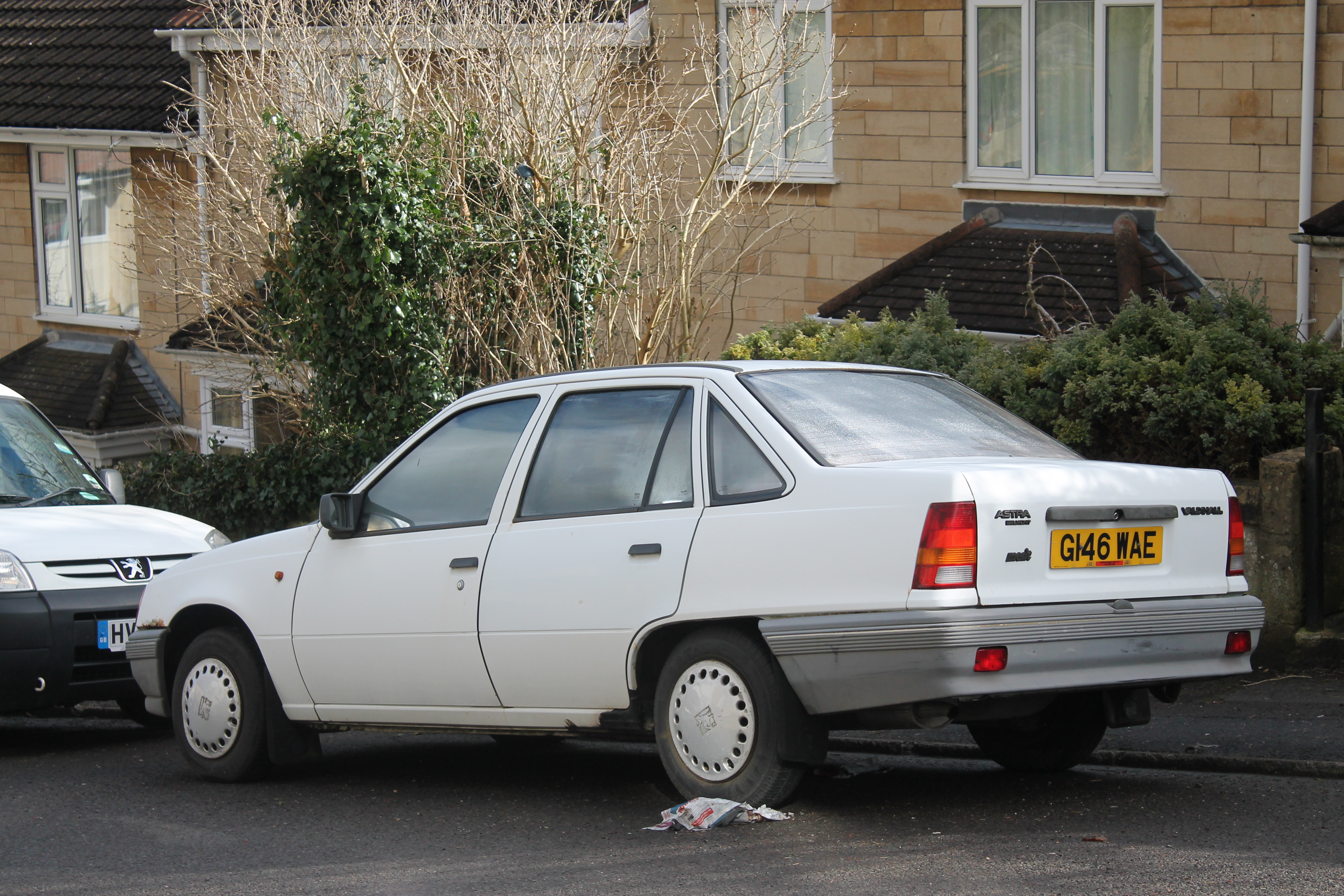
1990 Vauxhall Astra Belmont 1.4 Merit saloon

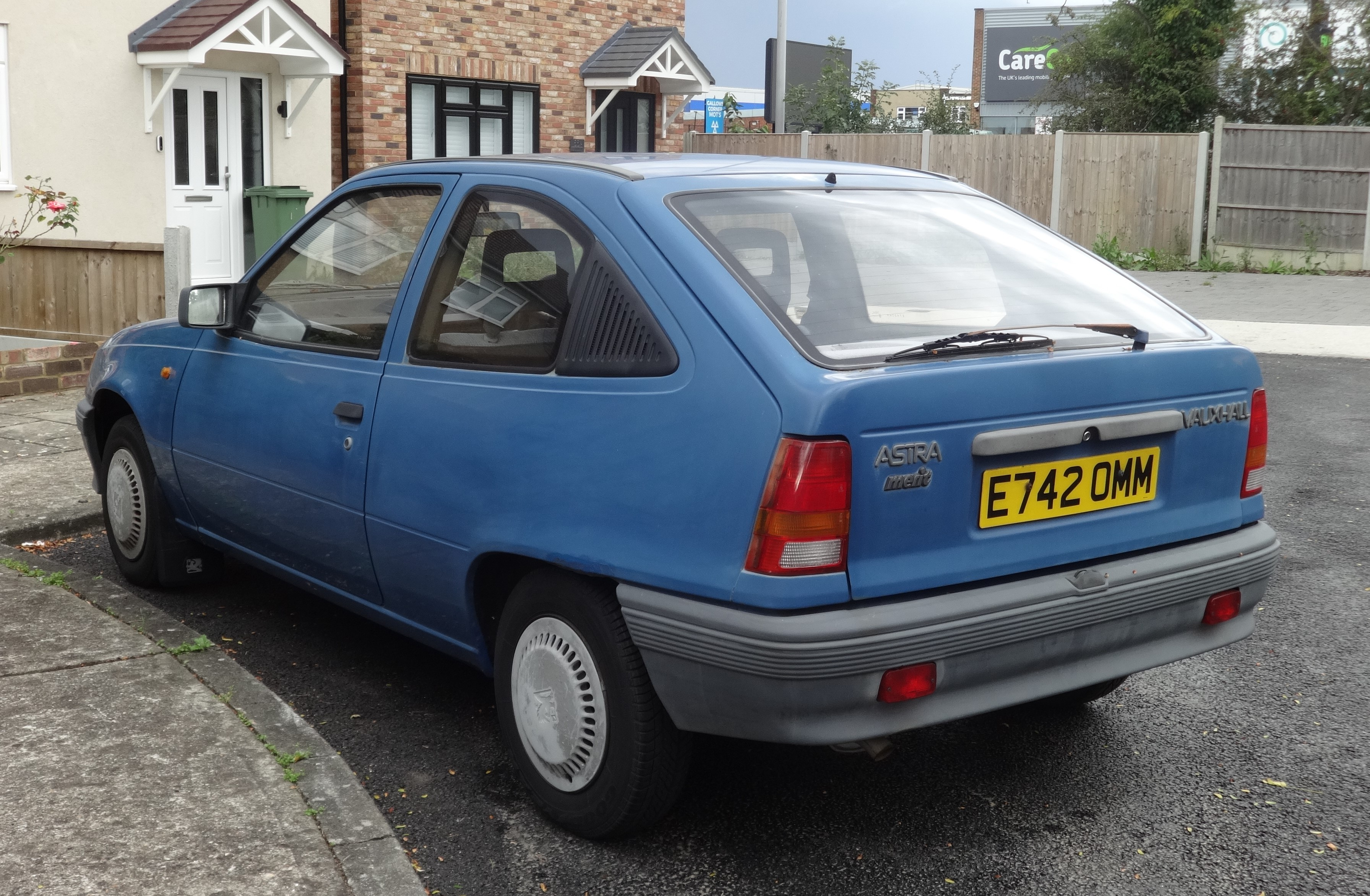
1988 Vauxhall Astra 1.3 Merit 3-door hatchback

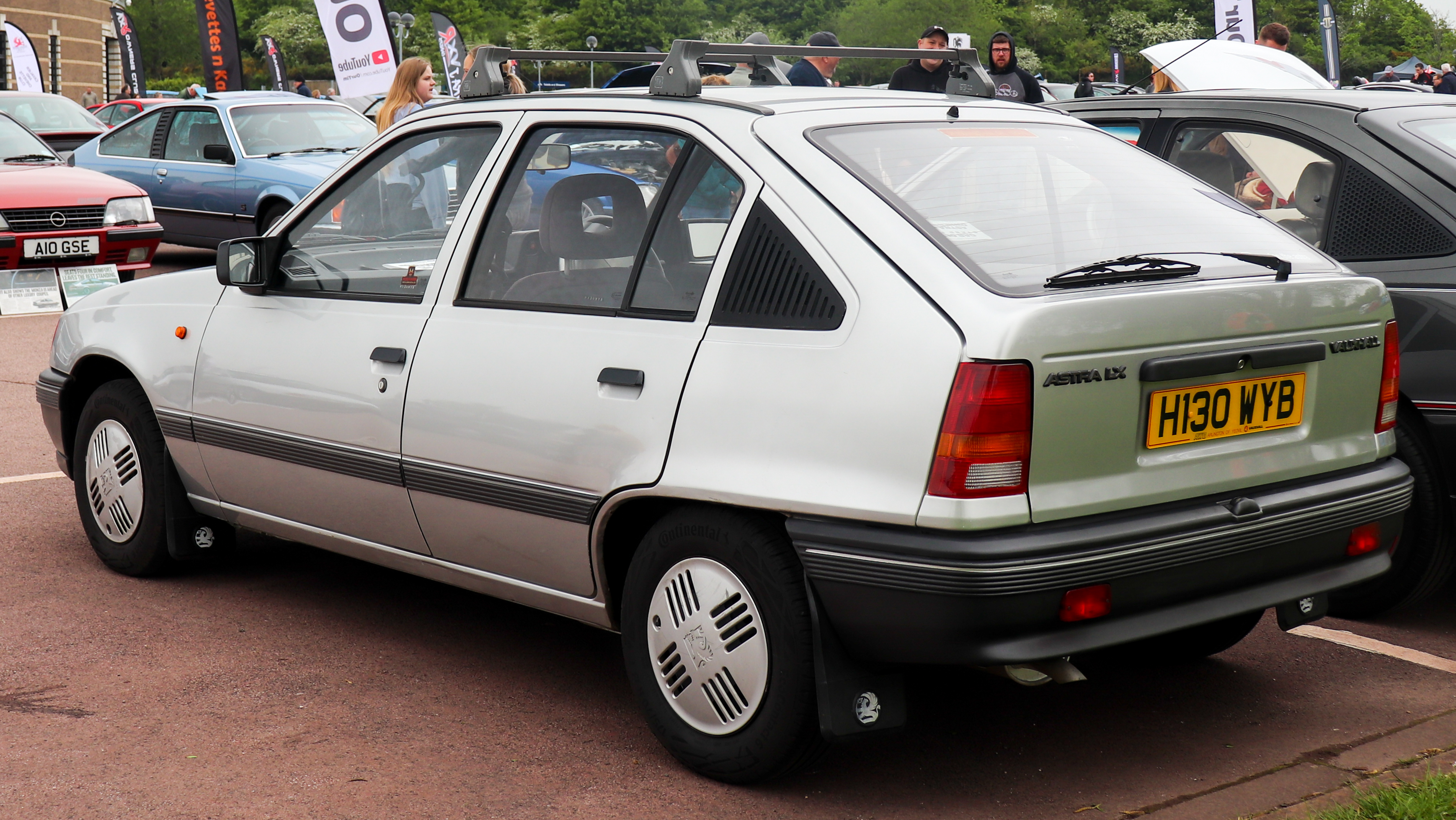
1991 Vauxhall Astra 1.4 LX 5-door hatchback

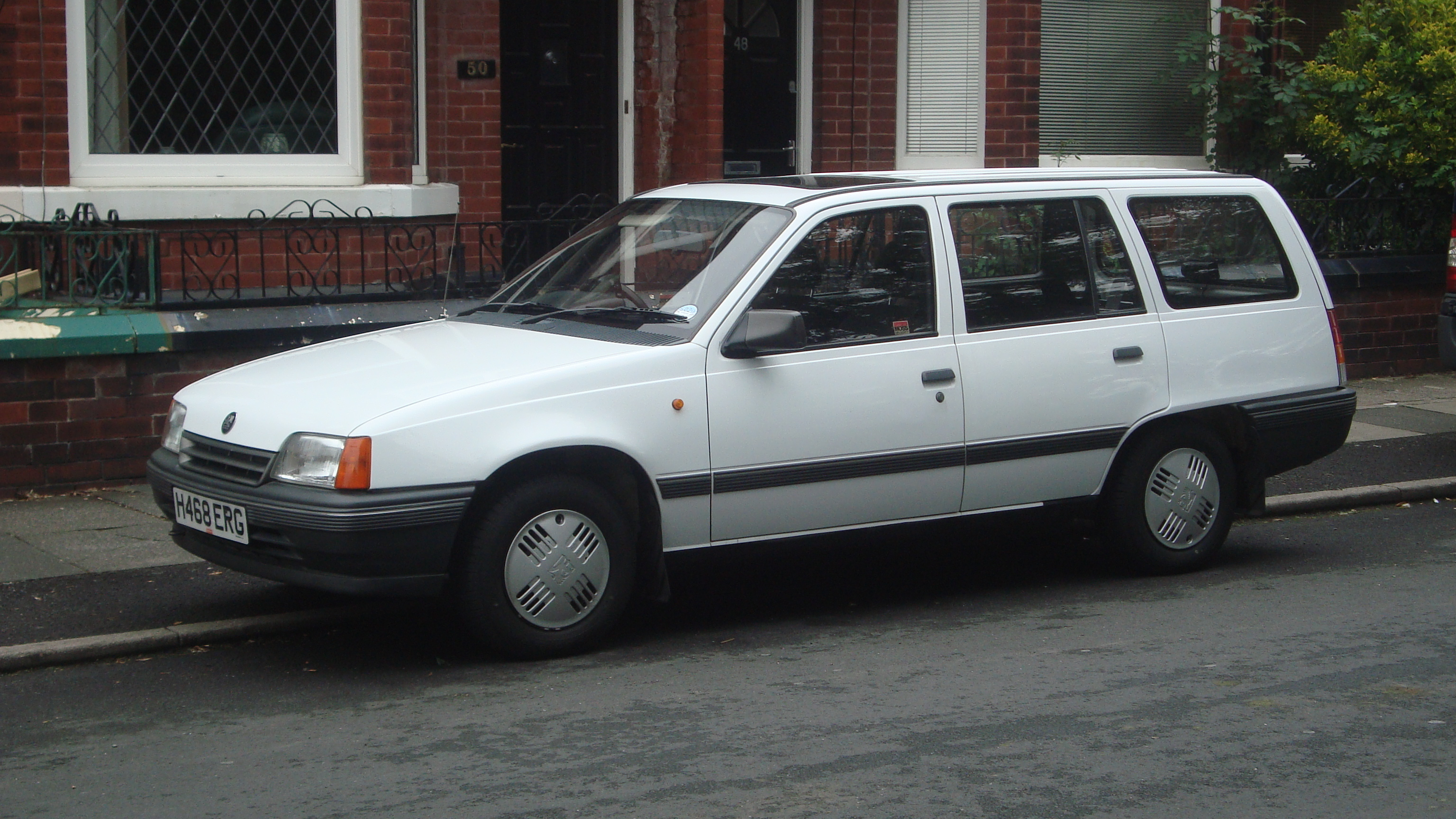
1991 Vauxhall Astra 1.4L Estate

The Mark 2 Astra was launched on 17 October 1984. It used the same range of engines and running gear as the Mark 1, but with a completely restyled body with better aerodynamics. It was voted 1985 European Car of the Year.

Long-lived, the Mark 2 was available in estate, hatchback, saloon and cabriolet versions. The saloon was launched in January 1986 and sold as the Vauxhall Belmont; this trend to brand saloon models independently of hatchbacks was also used by other manufacturers of the period, with examples including the Ford Orion and the Volkswagen Jetta. However, this strategy was mostly unsuccessful, as this was Vauxhall's only attempt at badging its hatchback-based saloon as a separate model, and Ford rebadged its Orion range as Escorts in September 1993.

In 1987, a special one off "design exercise" based on a 1986 1.8 GTE was built by the Ellesmere Port factory to celebrate its 25th (Silver) Anniversary. The Astra GTE "Quicksilver" was first shown at the British International Motor show that year and was displayed in the Ellesmere Port showroom throughout the plant's "Silver Anniversary" year. In 1990, Vauxhall began exporting Astras badged as Opel Kadetts to other European countries from the Ellesmere Port plant.

Bertone built 6,764 cabriolets from 1987 to 1993. These came as 1.6 (with 82 bhp (61 kW)) and 2-litre (115 bhp (86 kW)) GTEs, the latter available with powered roof and electric windows. These cars are praised for their shake-free shells and their looks.

The Mark 2 Astra sold well in the UK, and although it was never able to outsell the Ford Escort, it came closer than any other similar-sized car to achieving this.

In 2005, a survey found the two most stolen cars in Britain to be the Vauxhall Belmont and the Vauxhall Astra Mark 2, with more than 1 in 13 Belmonts stolen.

=== Astra GTE ===
Soon after the Mark 2 Astra was launched, they introduced the GTE using a 1.8-litre 115 hp (85 kW) engine lifted from the Mark 1 GTE, but this was quickly dropped in favour of a 124 hp (92 kW) 2.0 litre unit due to poorer than expected performance. All GTE models featured an all electronic dash with digital speedometer. Analogue instruments were an optional extra, but were very rarely selected over the digital dash. In 1988 Vauxhall's twin-camshaft version of the engine, the 20XE known as the "red top" (due to the red spark plug cover), was fitted to the GTE and instantly created a stir with the motoring press because of its performance. In fact the 20XE is a Cosworth designed twin-cam conversion of the GM Family II engine, also called the Cosworth KBA. When this engine was originally released in Europe and the UK it developed 156 hp (115 kW) and 150 ft lbs of torque in standard form. A few years later the GTE 16v, now subject to stricter emissions regulations, was fitted with a catalytic converter and a new exhaust manifold, which robbed the engine of 6 bhp, and 5 ft lbs of torque, and added .5 of a second to the 0–60 mph time, raising it from 7.0 seconds to 7.5 seconds. In 1990 the "leather edition" limited-edition was launched, and an allocation of around 250 examples sold only through London dealerships. This special edition came with Bordeaux paint work, and crossed spoke alloy wheels. It was also known as the "London Edition" and featured in a single sheet brochure printed in April 1990. Between the brochure being printed, and the time they hit the road the "Leather Edition" acquired some extra dealer fit decals to help them stand out further from the standard 16 valve GTE. These decals comprise a small three colour flash on the tail gate next to the GTE badge, and the same colours under the bumper strips on the sides near the rear arch. A silver strip was also added adjacent to this. The colours used were that of the GM racing teams, and once fitted these cars also became known as the "Champion" Edition. They came with Recaro seats and door cards clad in Connolly Leather.

== Third generation (1991–1998) ==
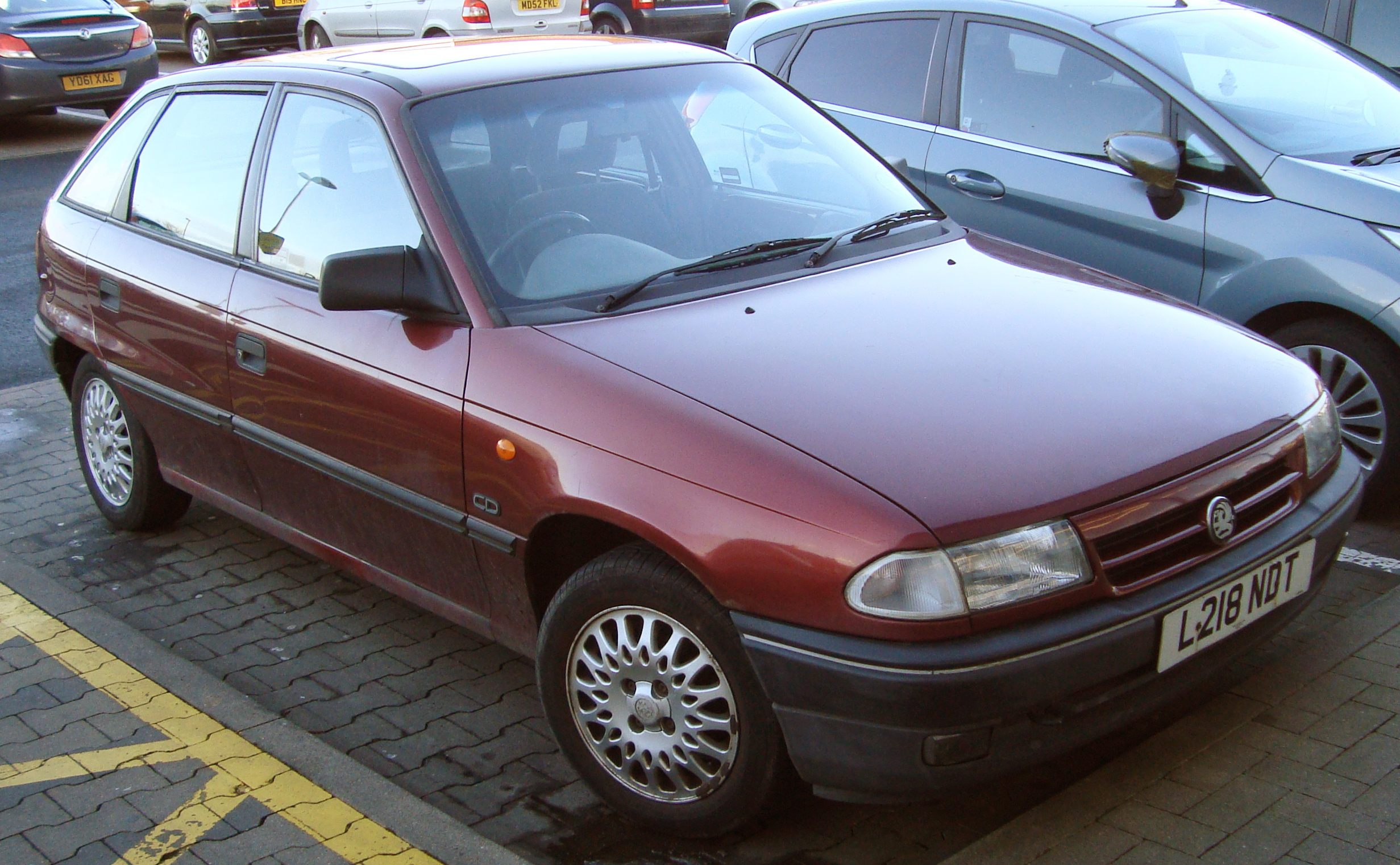
Vauxhall Astra Mark III five-door hatchback (Pre-facelift)

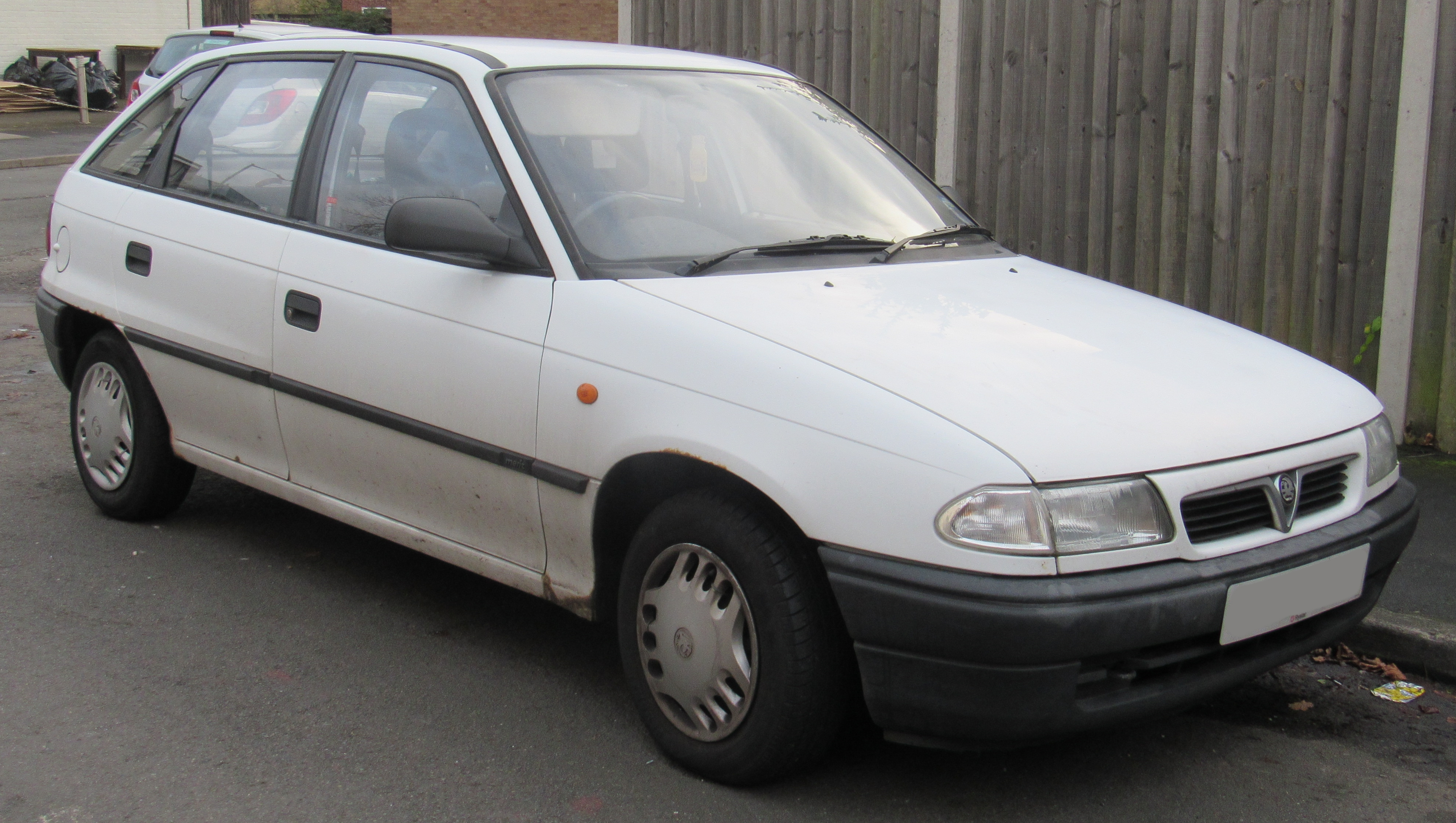
Vauxhall Astra Mark III five-door hatchback (Post-facelift)

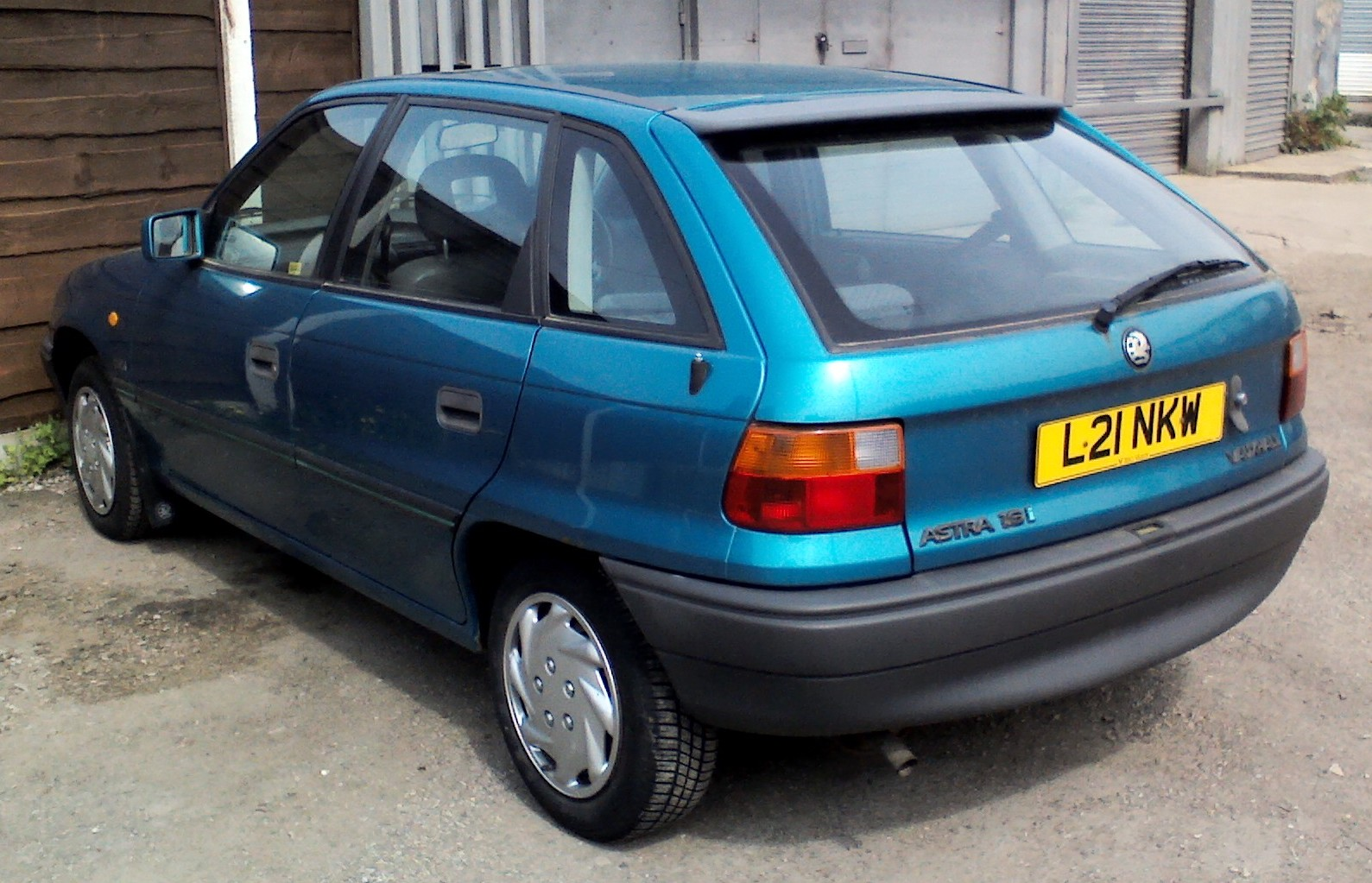
Vauxhall Astra Mk III 5-door hatchback (Pre-facelift)

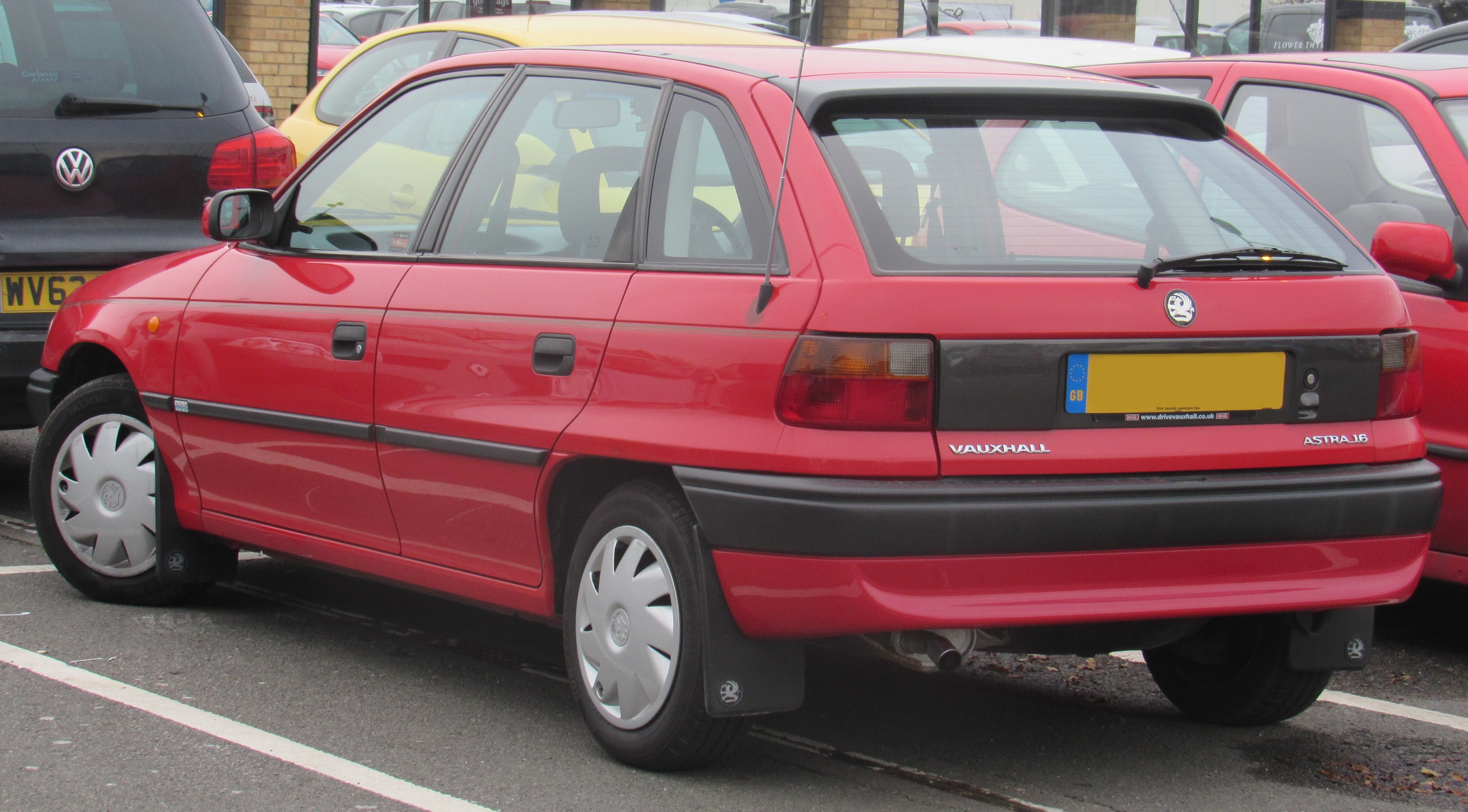
Vauxhall Astra Mk III 5-door hatchback (Post-facelift)

The Mark 3 Astra was released in October 1991. While Vauxhall had retained the Astra name, this generation was the first to also be called Astra by Opel (succeeding the Kadett E), and the first to also be sold by Holden. It was offered as a three- or five-door hatchback, a saloon, and an estate. A cabriolet was also offered, designed and built by Bertone.

The Astra was sold as a Holden first in New Zealand in 1995, and then in Australia in 1996. The first models were imported from the UK, then later from Belgium. The Holden Astra nameplate had originally been placed on a rebadged Nissan Pulsar, first sold in Australia in 1984.

Initially, the car launched with refreshed versions of the GM Family I and Family II engines from the two previous generations, but now fitted with fuel injection and catalytic converters as standard to satisfy European emissions legislation.

The range was revised in late 1994, with the launch of Opel's new Ecotec engine. For a short period, a submodel which consisted of parts from both revisions was produced. The submodel used all the new Ecotec running gear, but many parts from the previous revision were used in order to use up leftover parts. Other main changes included mildly-altered exterior styling – featuring Vauxhall's new corporate 'V' front grille first seen on the 1994 Omega, a smoked grey trim panel available on all cars on the rear tailgate to smooth over the protruding rear lamp clusters, and availability of new specification models.

The top Vauxhall Astra model was the three-door only GSi, powered by either the same 2.0 engine found in the Mark 2, or a new 1.8 16v petrol injected model with 124 bhp (92 kW). It also featured sports bodykit and interior. The GSi ceased production in 1994 but was reintroduced in 1997, with the engine being replaced with a lower-powered but more modern 'Ecotec' version (2.0 16v with 134 bhp) the bodykit was slightly altered on these models – a longer rear spoiler with integrated brake light, fluted side skirts, a bonnet without vents, and removal of the GSi16v badging from the bumper and tailgate (replaced by the later chrome effect Vauxhall Astra 2.0 16v badging). The second phase GSi's had air conditioning (and no sunroof) available as an option.

In common with other car manufacturers, the early 1990s saw Vauxhall featuring safety as a selling point, and beginning to incorporate many new safety features into cheaper family cars that were previously only found on expensive luxury saloons. The Mark 3 Astra was one of the first such cars, being introduced ahead of the Volkswagen Golf and Ford Mondeo, two other cars with a similar new-found focus on safety. Therefore, the Mark 3 saw the introduction of twin side impact bars, a toughened safety cage, a safely-designed steering wheel (with collapsible columns) and 'body-lock' mechanical front seat-belt pre-tensioners. After the first face-lift full-size drivers air bags became optional or standard (depending on the model). Crash tests by consumers association (as featured by BBC's Watchdog show in 1992) and also by ADAC and Auto Express showed that the Mark 3 Astra protected better in crashes than most rivals of its time.

In the UK, Vauxhall offered the following trim levels (and in some cases, engine size):

- MERIT (1.4i, 1.7 diesel, 1.7 turbodiesel)
- L (1.4i)
- LS (1.4i, 1.6i, 1.7 diesel, 1.7 turbodiesel, 1.7 Isuzu turbodiesel)
- GLS (1.4i, 1.6i, 1.7 diesel, 1.7 Turbodiesel, 1.7 Isuzu turbodiesel)
- DUO (1.6)
- CD (1.4i, 1.6i, 1.7 turbodiesel, 1.8i, 2.0i)
- CDX (1.6i 1.7 turbodiesel, 2.0i)
- Si (1.4i, 1.6i)
- SRi (2.0i)
- GSi (2.0i 16v (1991 onwards) and 1.8 16v – very early models could be ordered with a 2.0i 8v)

The car also had 'special edition' badging, which indicated special trim:

- Sport
- Expression
- California
- Arctic
- Arctic II
- Arizona
- Premier
- Cesaro
- Montana
- Diamond
- Swing
- Ethos
- Atlas
- Pacific

In later Sport and GSi models (from 1995 onwards), Lotus Sprung Suspension was used to give a better ride. The Sport models essentially replaced the GSi cars in 1994/1995 due to a drop in sales caused by insurance prices rising sharply.

The Pacific special edition was a model that featured a complete Irmscher body styling package with 15" Cesaro wheels from the Mark 3 Cavalier.

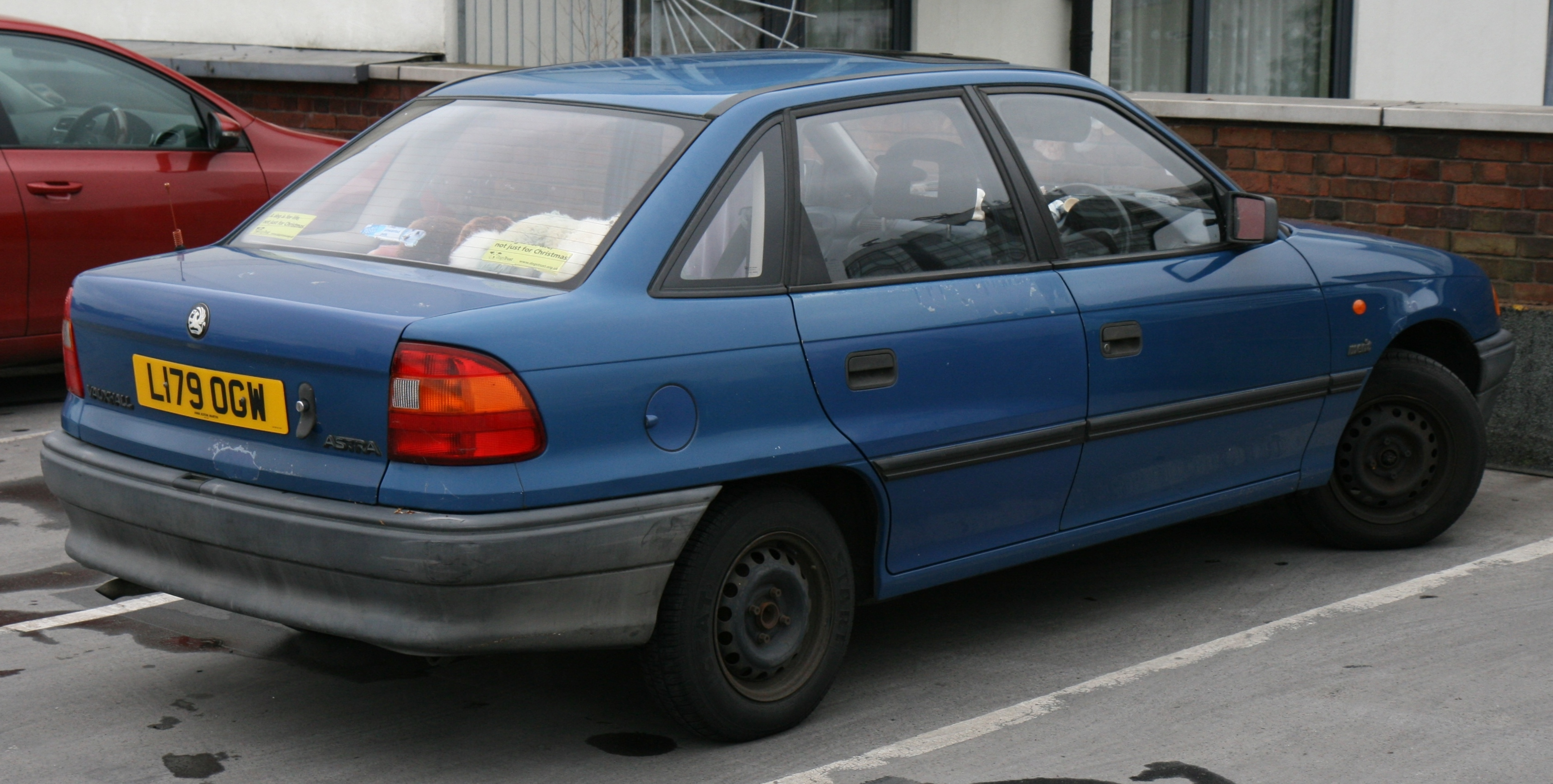
Astra Saloon

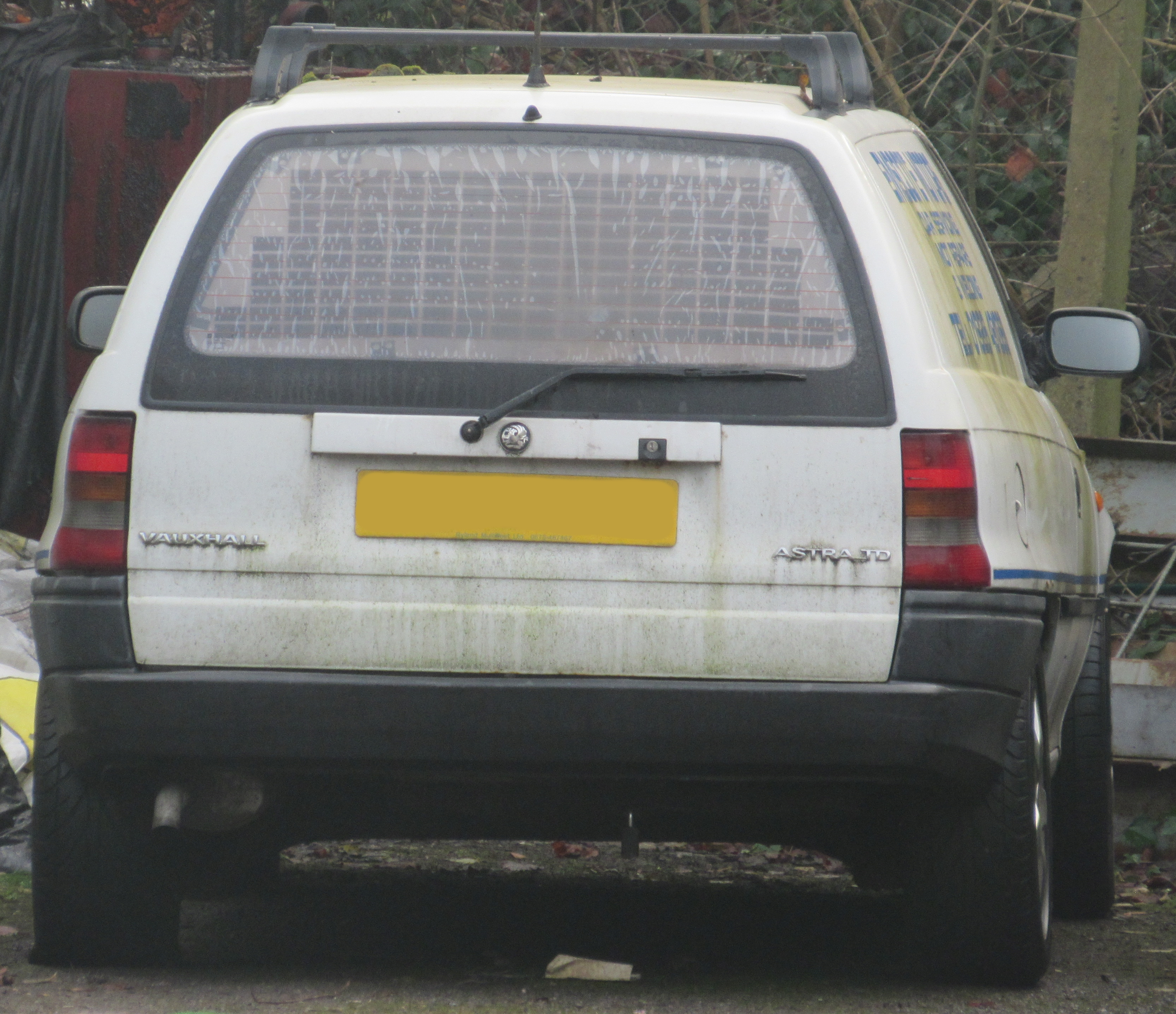
Astra Van

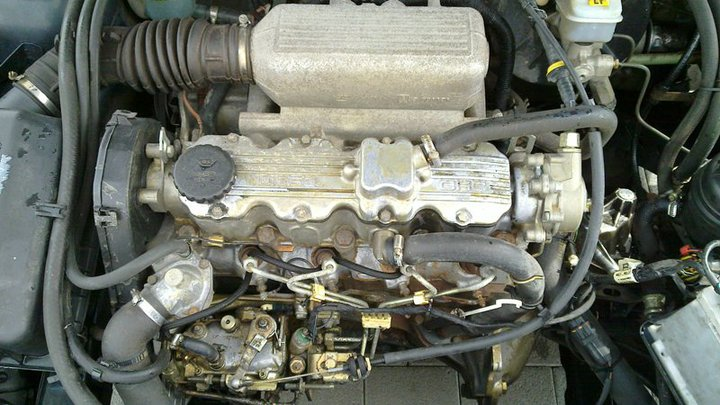
Astra 1.7 Diesel Engine

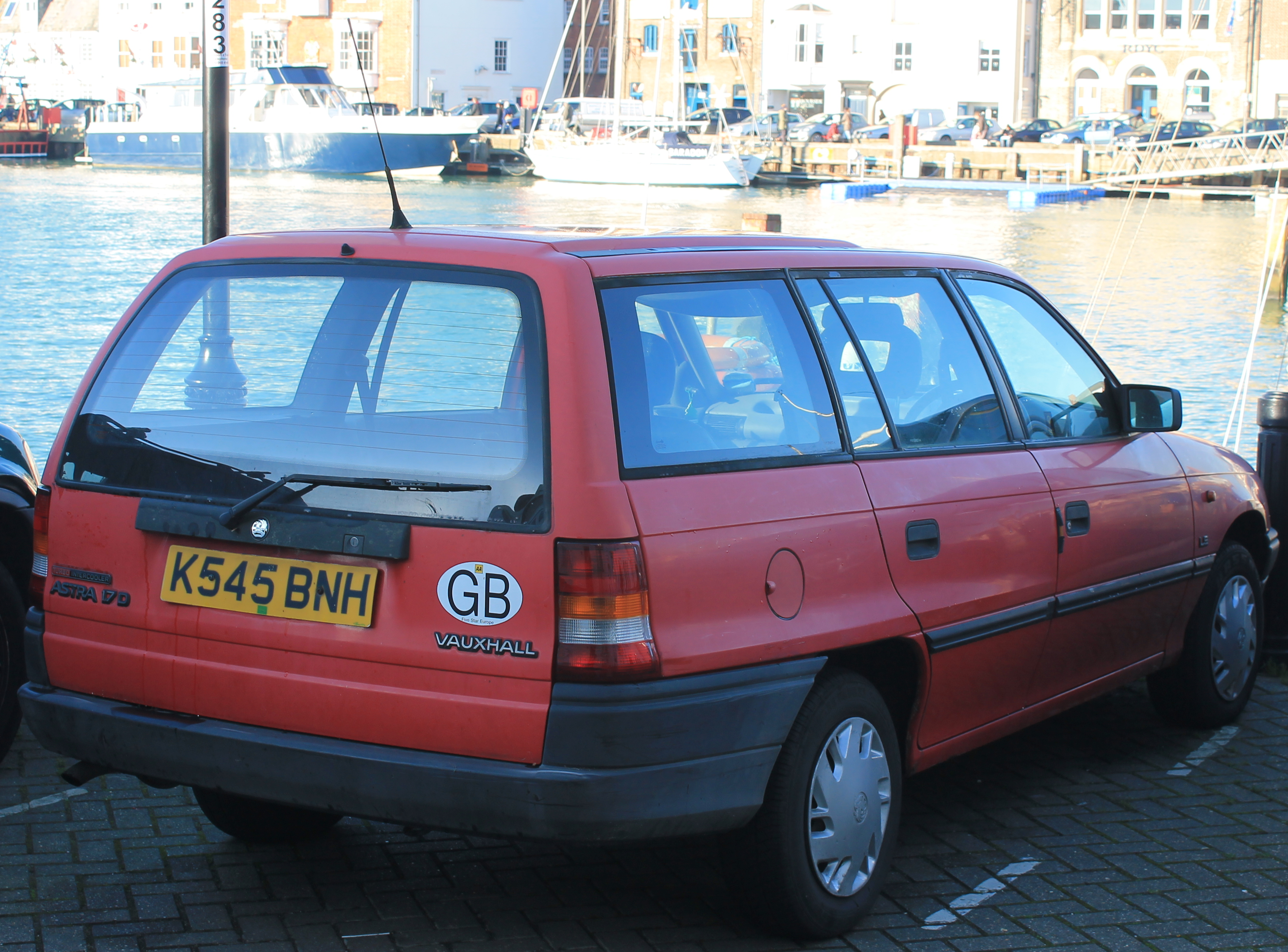
Astra Estate

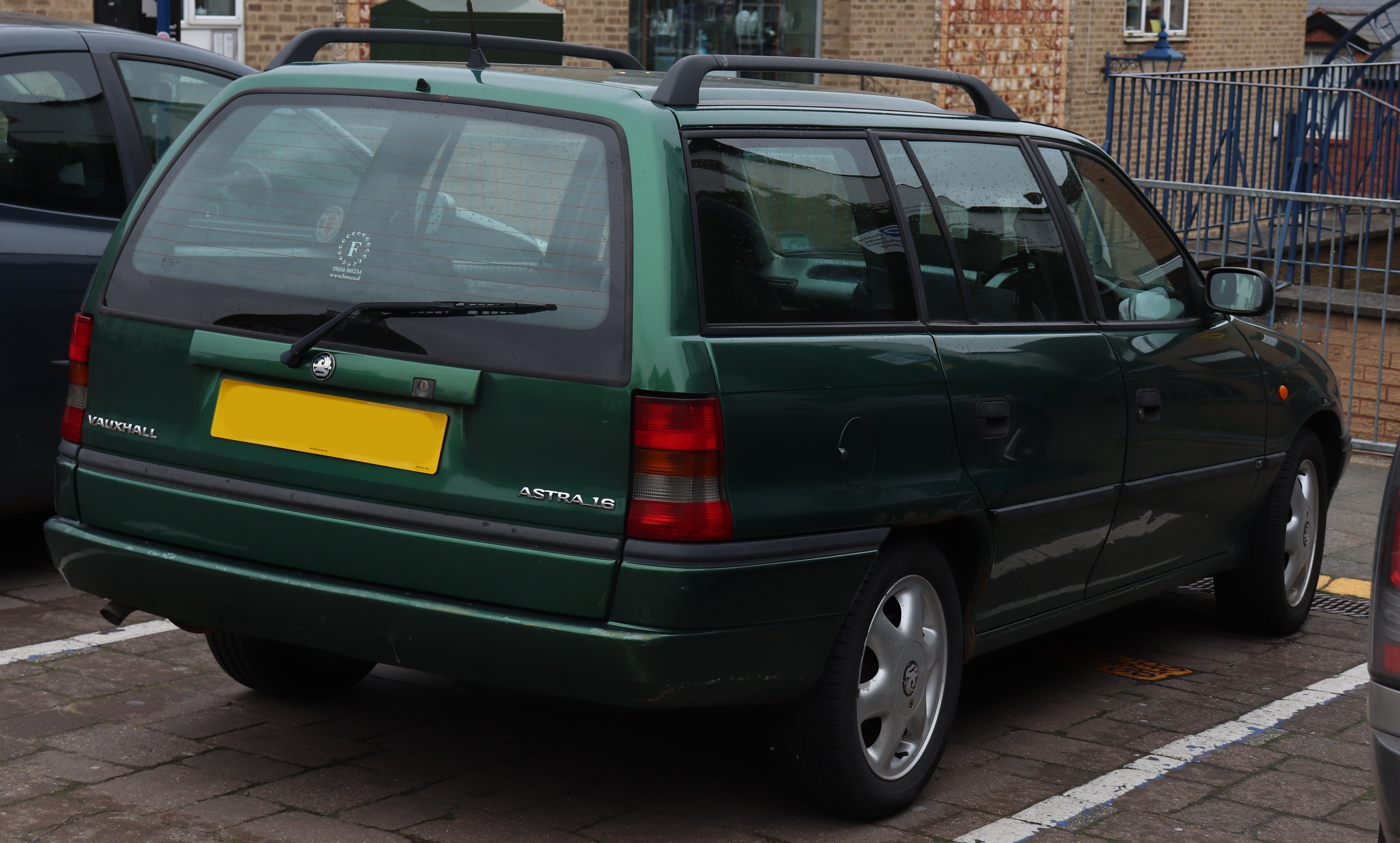
Astra Estate Facelift

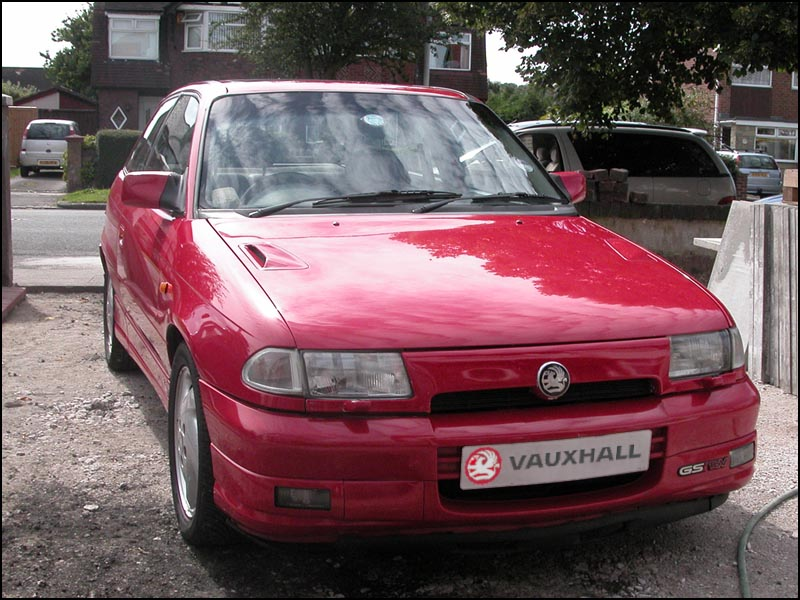
1992–1994 Astra GSi (phase 1, 3-door hatchback)

== Fourth generation (1998–2006) ==
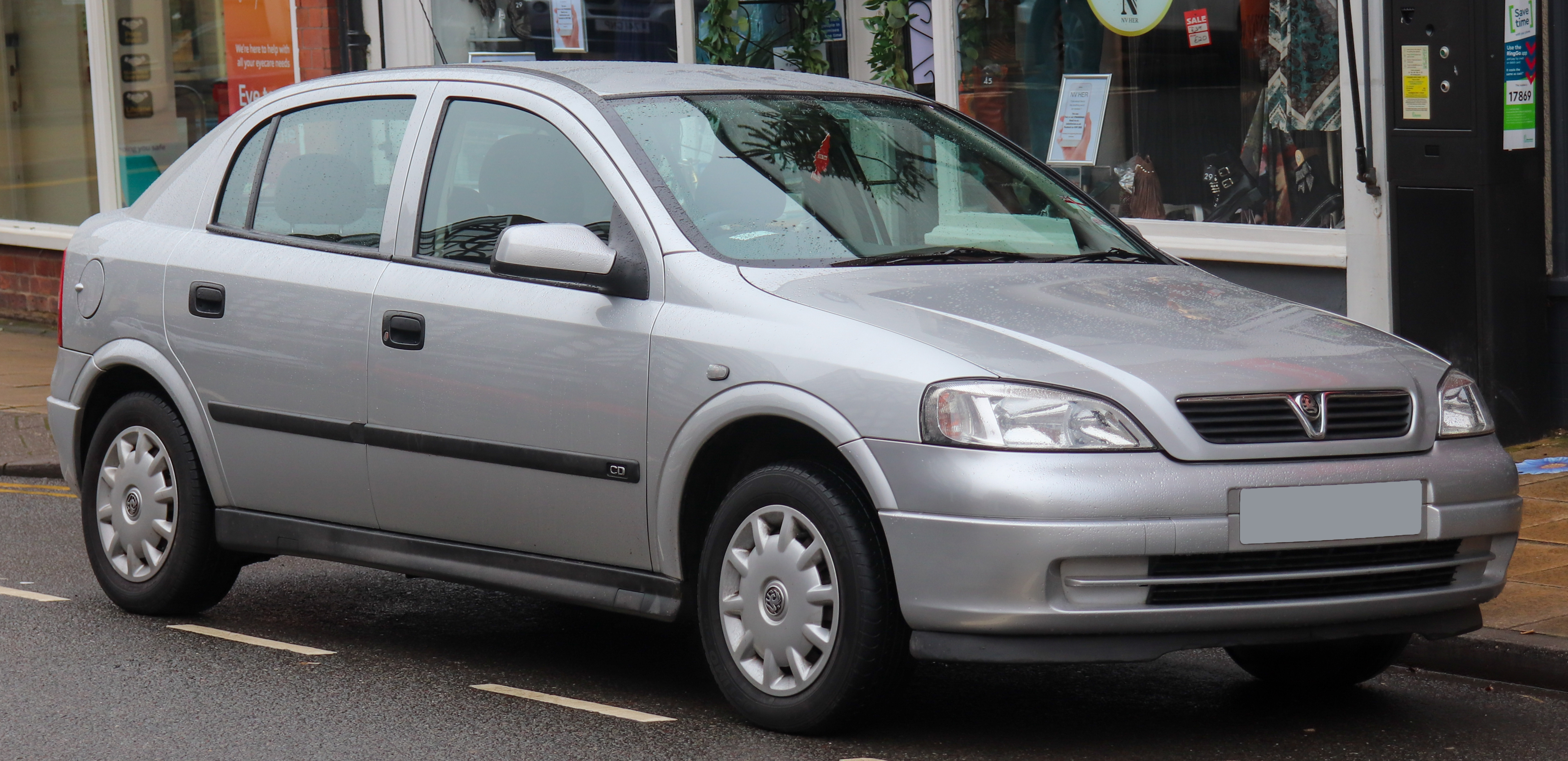
Vauxhall Astra MkIV hatchback

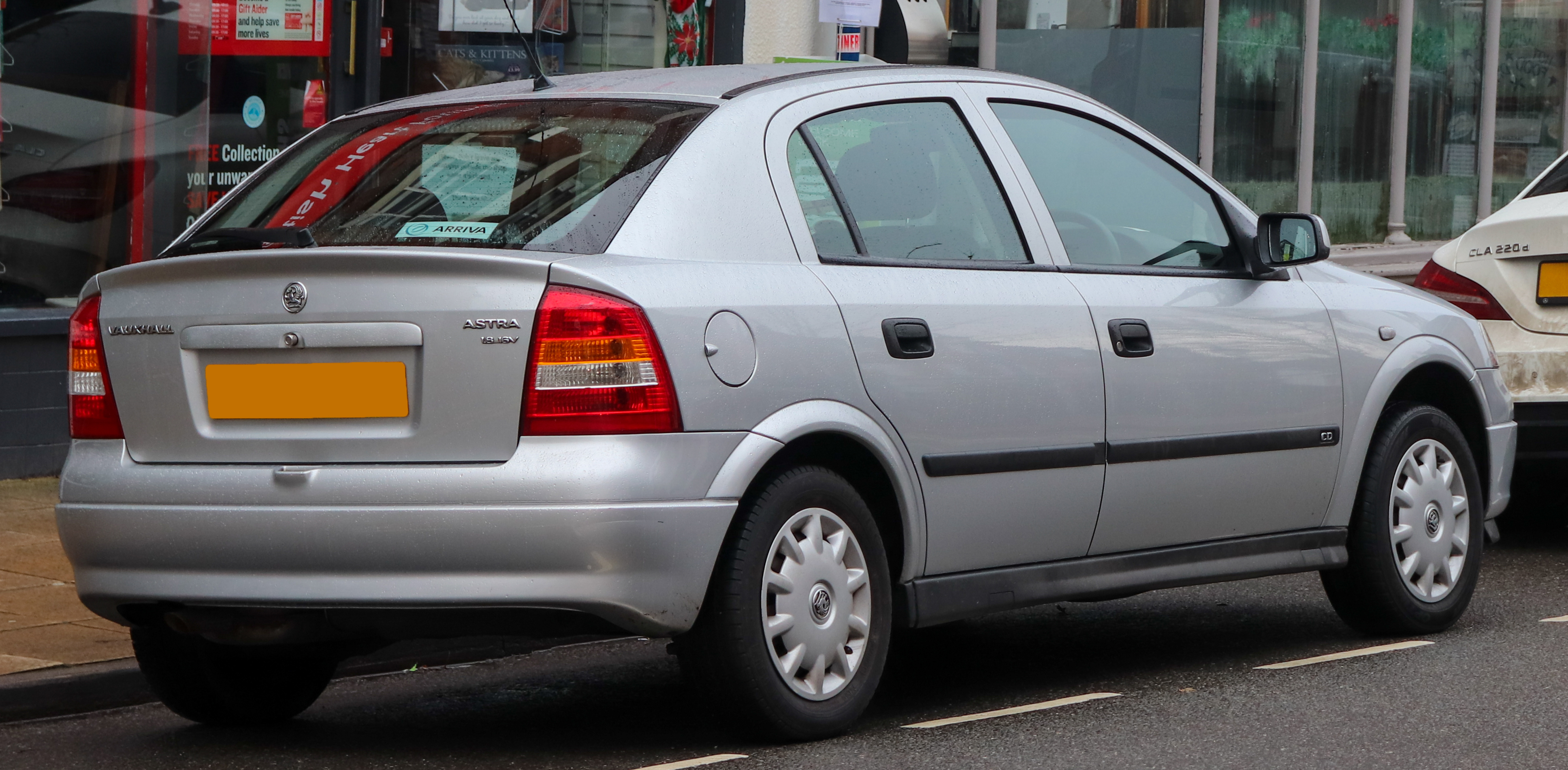
Vauxhall Astra MkIV hatchback

Following its launch at the London Motor Show in October 1997, the Astra Mk4 was released in Spring 1998 and addressed many of the criticisms of the MK3 in the UK with greatly improved ride and handling. The growing emphasis on safety was also reflected in greater body rigidity, resulting in a Euro NCAP 4 star crash test rating, considered excellent for its time. In the UK, the MK4 Astra was available with a range of 16v Ecotec engines as well some 8v units. The 8v unit was refined during the model's life however, with the Z16SE offering good all round performance compared with its higher insurance 16v equivalent. In addition to the standard hatchback and estate variants, the MK4 also had a popular choice of the coupé and convertible, both released in the year 2000. There was also a saloon variant offered which sold poorly. Although it was replaced in 2004 by the MK5, variants of the model continued for a while afterwards, 5-door hatchbacks were sold until mid-2005 with a reduced range, while the coupe, convertible and Astravan models continued into 2006. This was available in four petrol engine types:

- The 1.2 Z12XE produced 75 bhp (available in Ireland and other E. European countries only)
- The 1.4 16v X14XE produced 88 bhp (66 kW; 89 PS).
- The 1.6 8v X16SZR produced 75 hp, later the Z16SE produced 85 hp
- The 1.6 16v Produced 101 bhp (75 kW; 102 PS), later the 1.6 Twinport Z16XEP produced 105 bhp
- The 1.8 X18XE1 produced 115 bhp, later Z18XE 125 bhp (93 kW; 127 PS).
- The 2.0 X20XEV produced 134 bhp.
- The 2.2 Z22SE produced 147 bhp (110 kW; 149 PS).
- The 2.0 Turbocharged produced 189 bhp (141 kW; 192 PS) SRI Turbo and 197 bhp (147 kW; 200 PS) GSI Turbo Variant.

There were also these diesel variants:

- The 1.7 DTi producing 75 bhp (56 kW; 76 PS).
- The 1.7 CDTi producing 80 bhp (60 kW; 81 PS).
- The 2.0 DTL 16v producing 85 bhp
- The 2.0 DTi Y20DTH producing 100 bhp

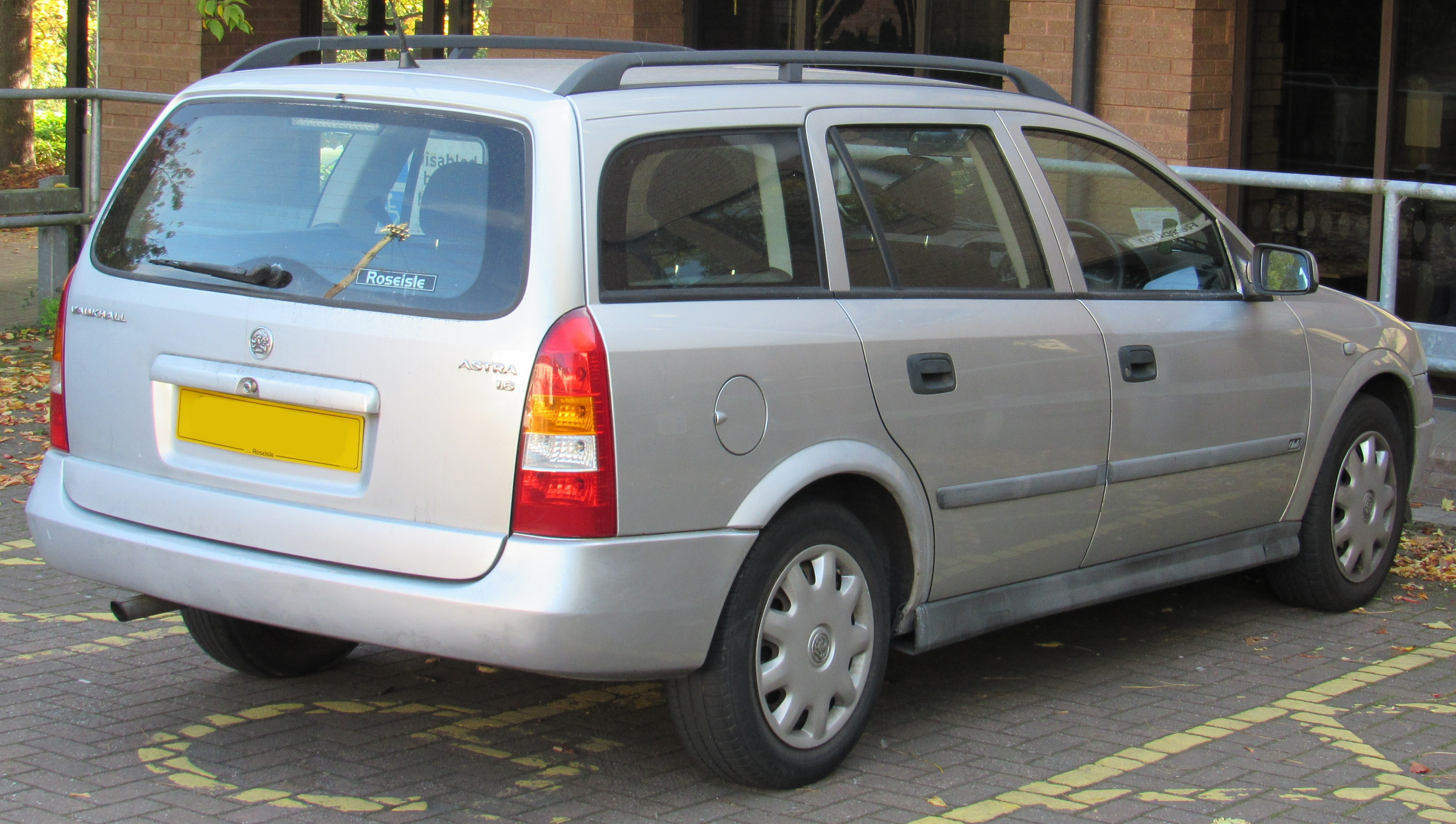
Vauxhall Astra MkIV estate

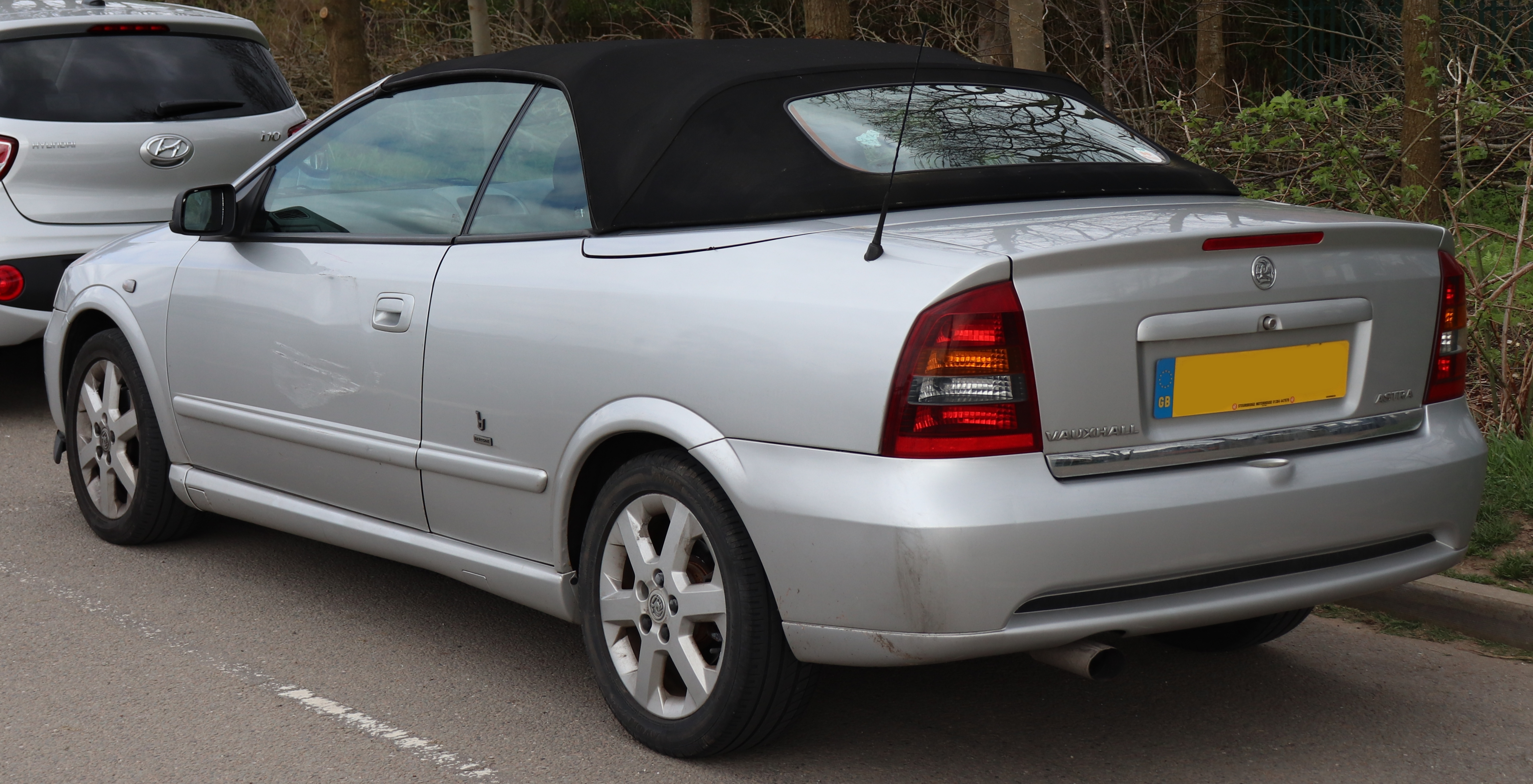
Vauxhall Astra MkIV coupe convertible

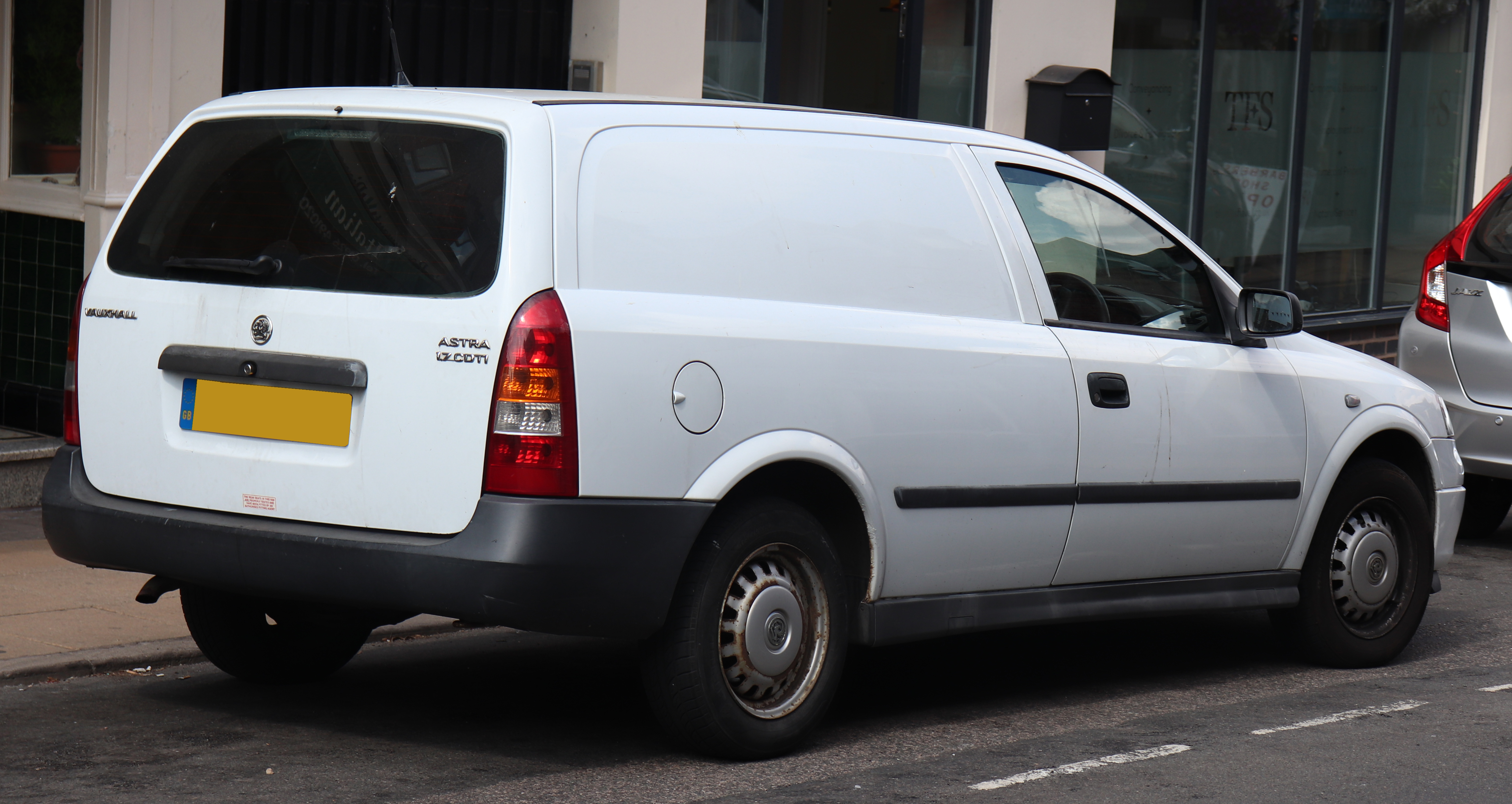
Vauxhall Astravan MkIV

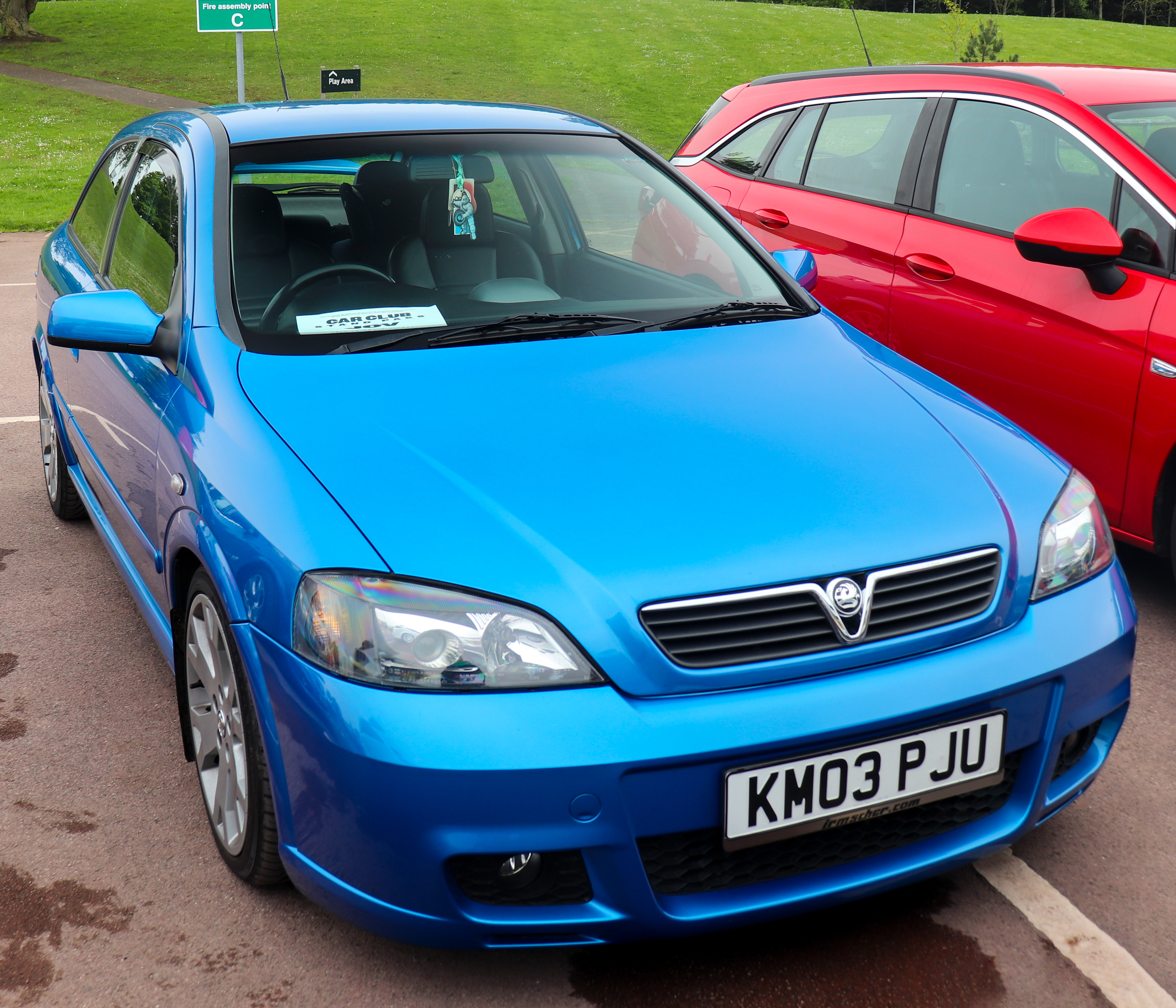
Vauxhall Astra MkIV GSi coupe

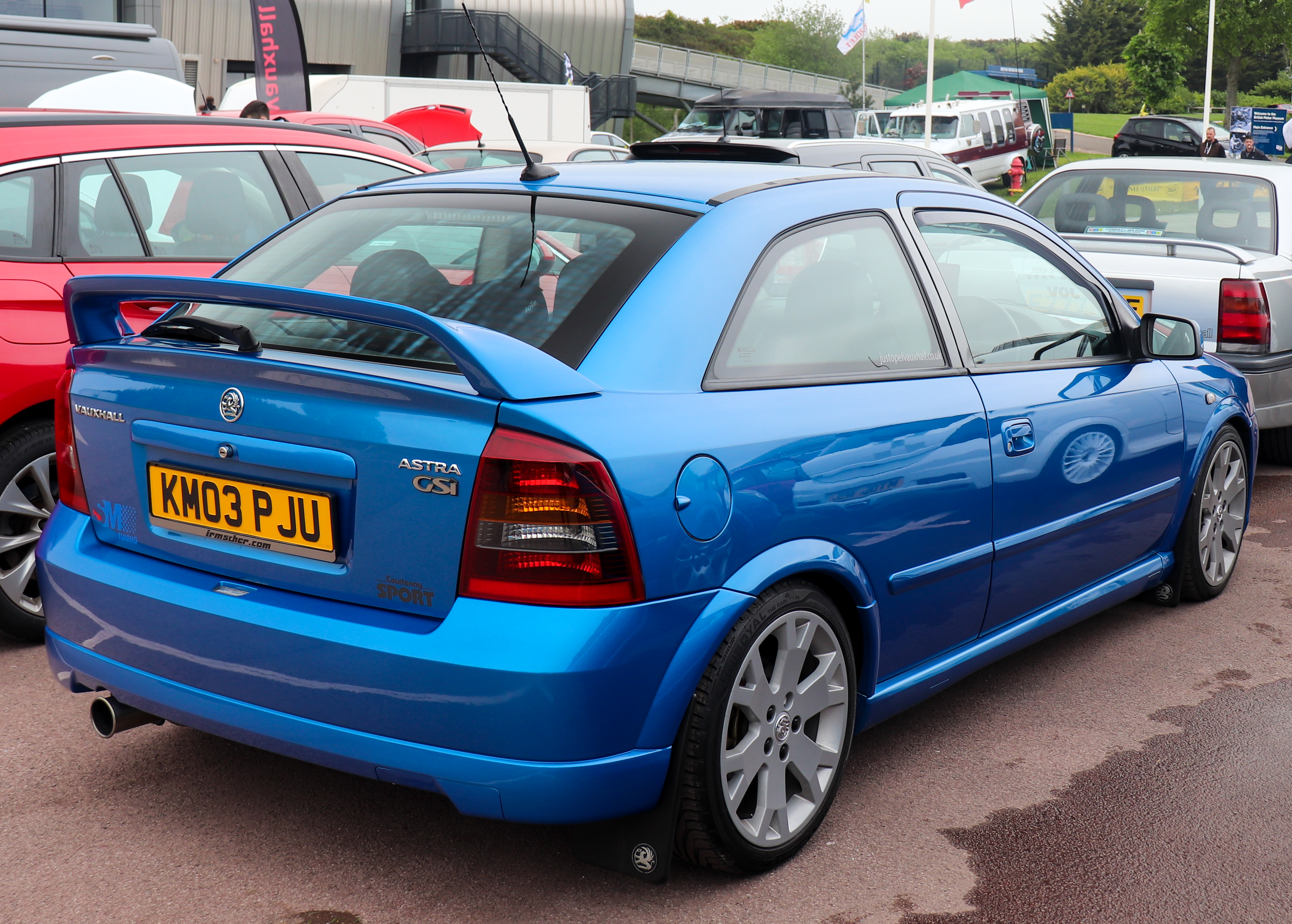
Vauxhall Astra MkIV GSi coupe

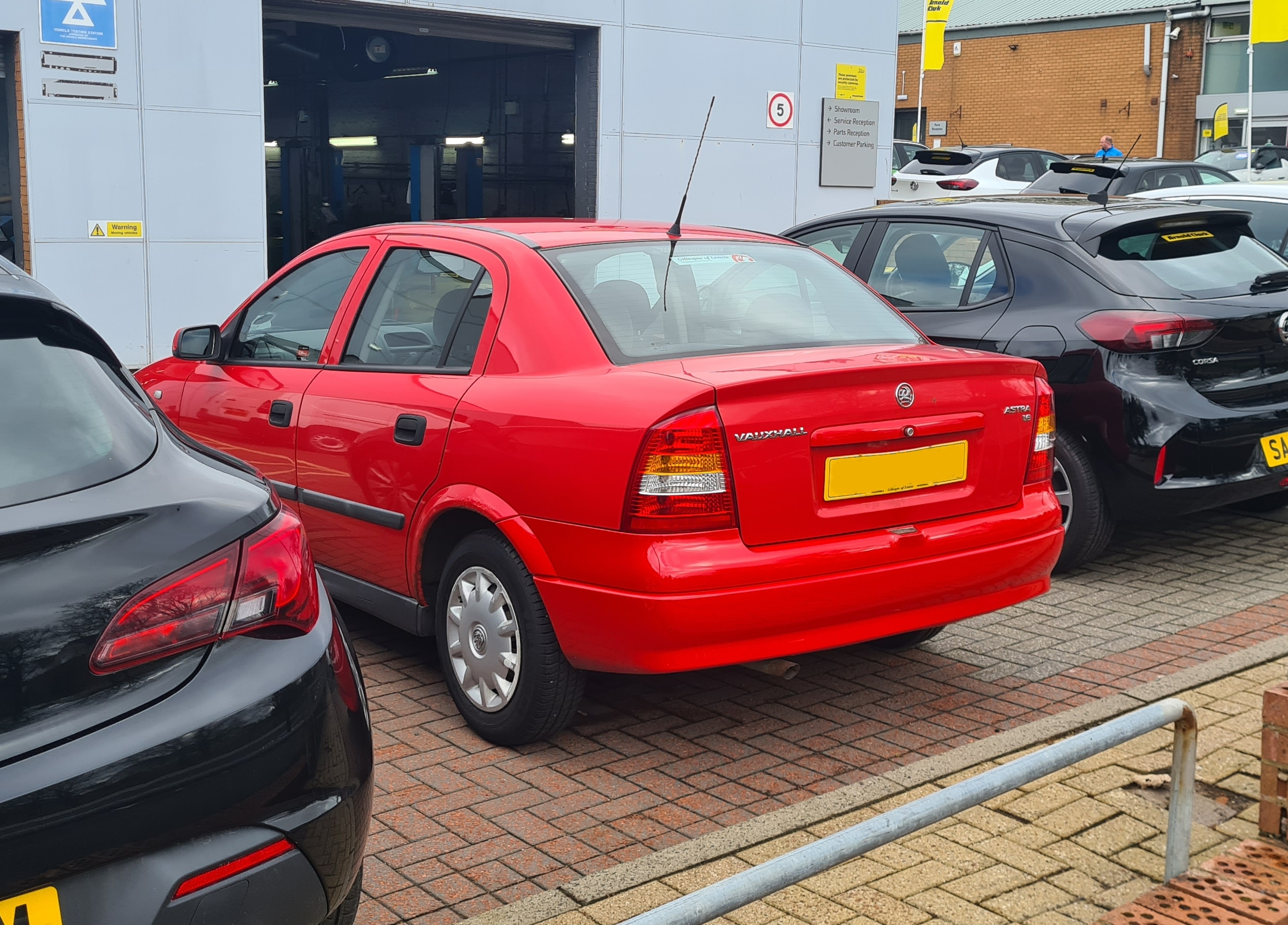
Vauxhall Astra MkIV saloon

== Fifth generation (2004–2013) ==
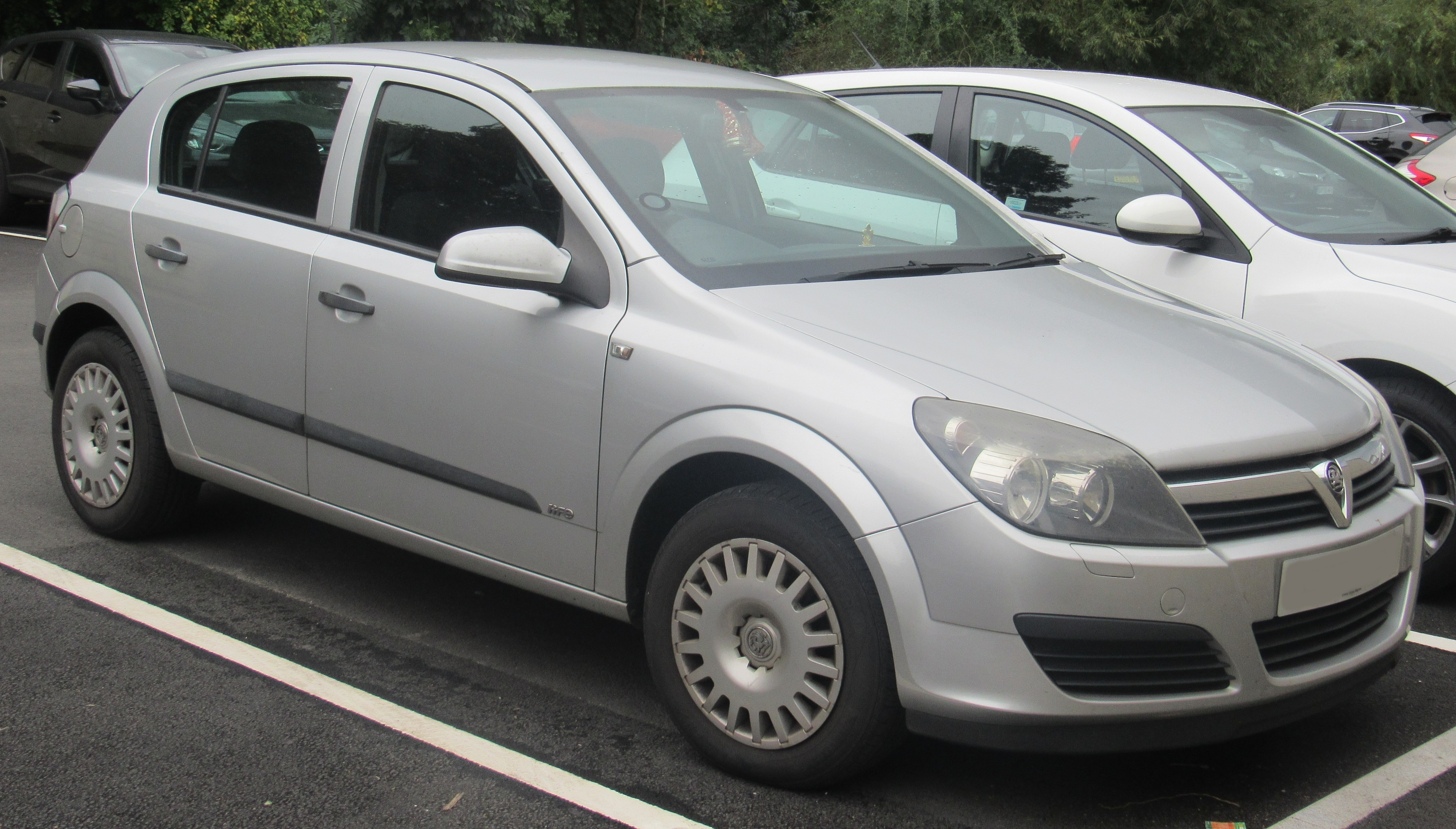
Vauxhall Astra Mark V five-door hatchback

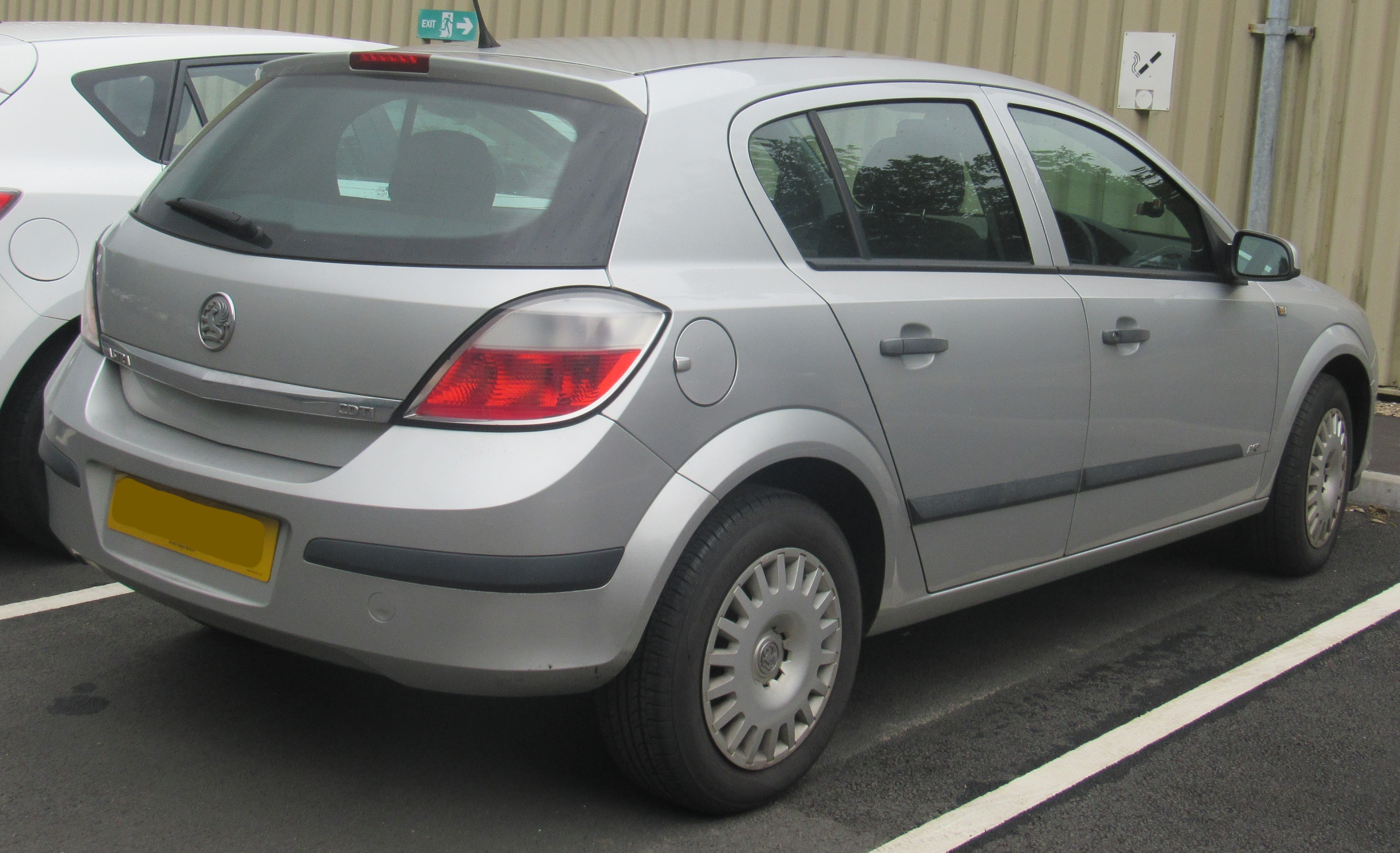
Vauxhall Astra Mark V five-door hatchback

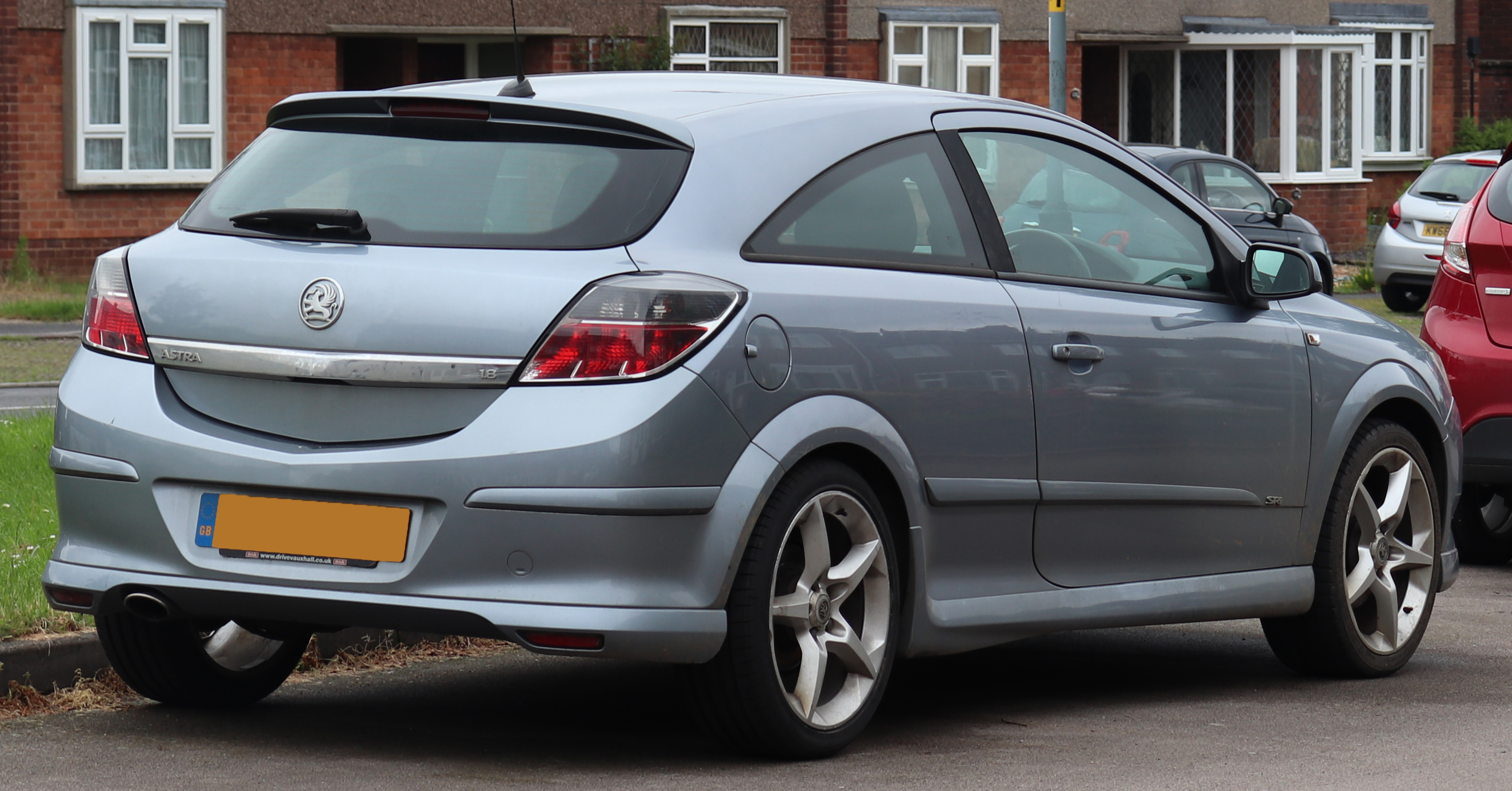
Vauxhall Astra Mark V three-door Sport Hatch

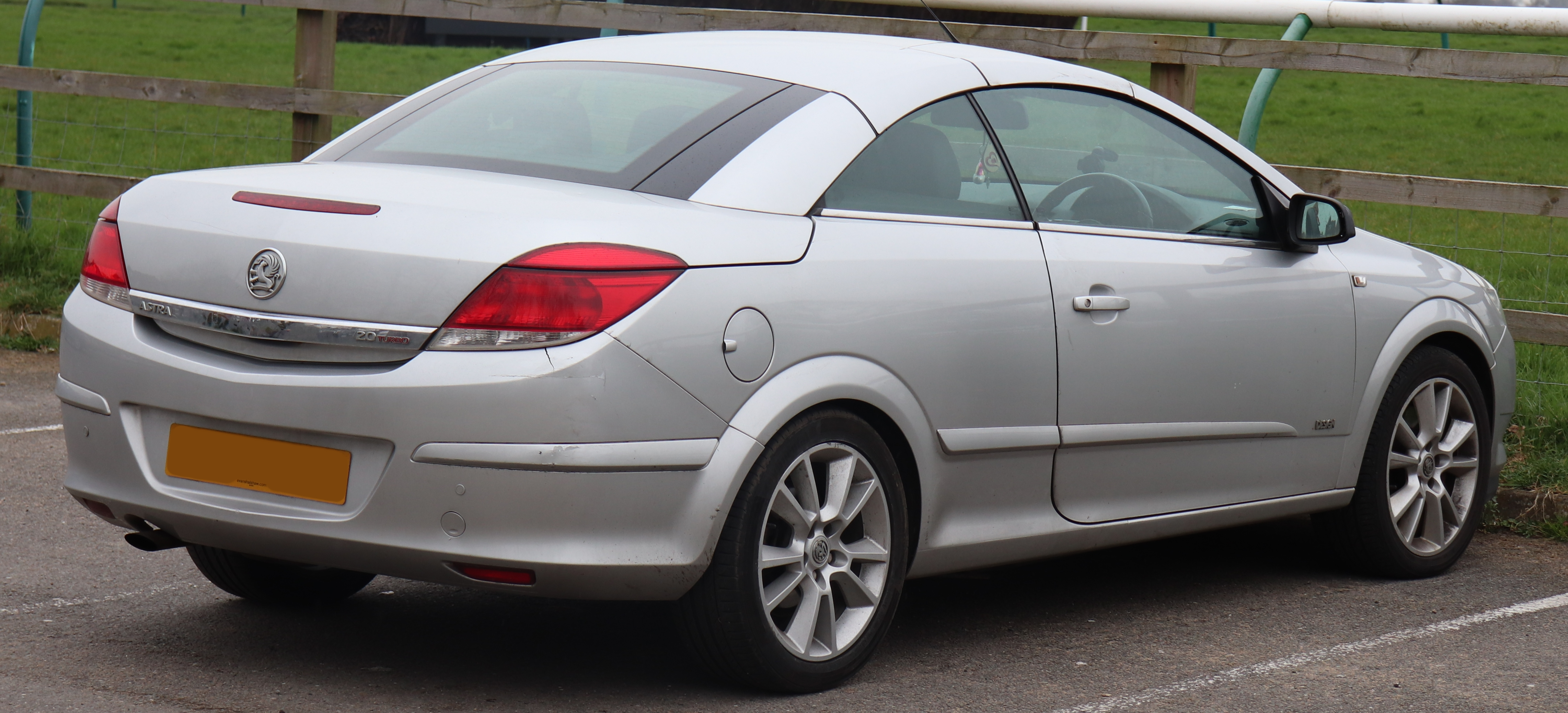
Vauxhall Astra Mark V TwinTop convertible

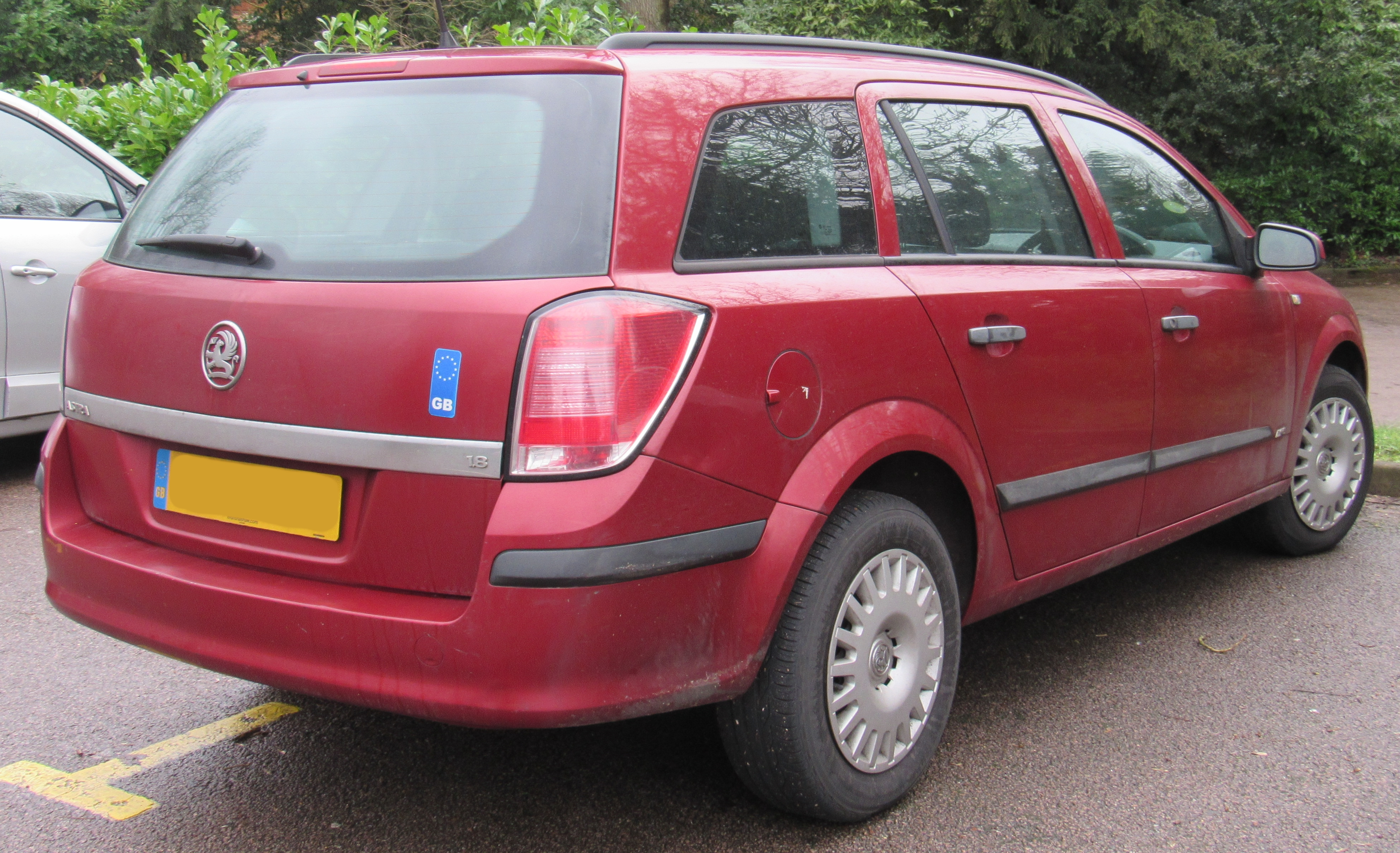
Vauxhall Astra Mark V five-door estate

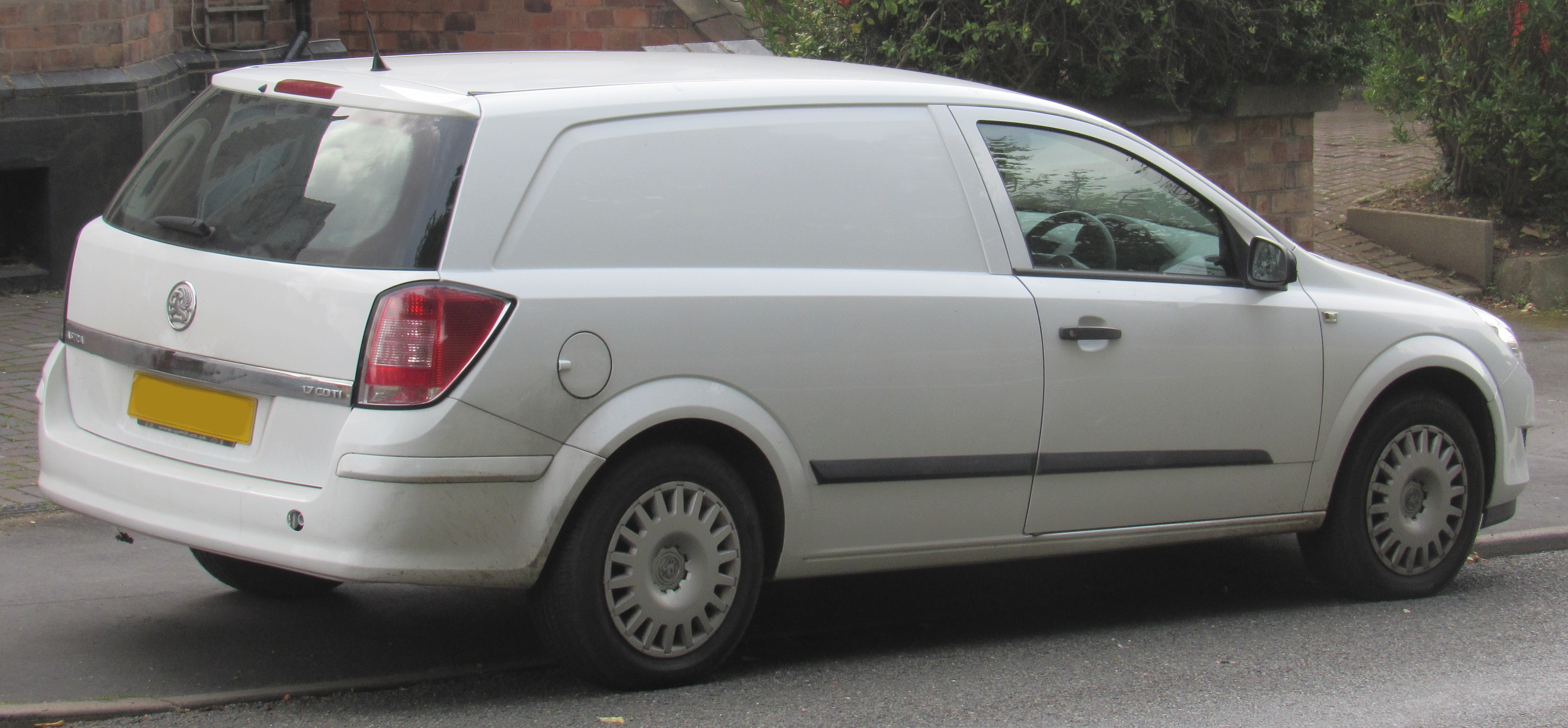
Vauxhall Astravan Mark V

The Astra Mark V or H was first launched in May 2004 as a five-door hatchback, which by the end of the year was joined by a five-door estate and a sporty three-door hatchback called the Sport Hatch in the UK. The Sport Hatch had the option of a "panoramic windscreen" (unique for a production car at the time of its launch) which extended the windscreen into the roof area. While a saloon model was offered elsewhere as an Opel and Chevrolet, this Astra range did not include one, due to poor sales of its predecessor.

The main variants were Life, Club, Design, SXi, SRi, Elite, and the flagship VXR (Sport Hatch only), which had 240 PS (177 kW). However, special edition models included Active, Energy, Breeze and VXR Nurburgring. The latter was only available in white with a distinctive black (and white) chequered stripe across the bonnet, roof & tailgate.

The petrol models included naturally aspirated 1.4-, 1.6-, and 1.8-litre options, as well as 1.6- or 2.0-litre turbocharged variants. The diesel models included 1.3-, 1.7-, and 1.9-litre turbodiesels. All diesel models were called CDTI and the majority of engines have 16 valves.

From 2006, the TwinTop two-door coupé convertible was available in the Vauxhall Astra range, having already been a variant on the Tigra.

The Astra Mark V was also the first Astra to feature a Euro NCAP 5 star crash test rating.

The five-door Astra was replaced in late 2009 (although various models were still available throughout 2010 and 2011), while the three-door Sport Hatch wasn't replaced until late 2011.

This was the last Astra to include an Astravan variant. Production ceased in 2012 (with sales continuing into 2013) and it was effectively replaced by the Fiat Doblò-based Opel/Vauxhall Combo van.

== Sixth generation (2009–2015) ==
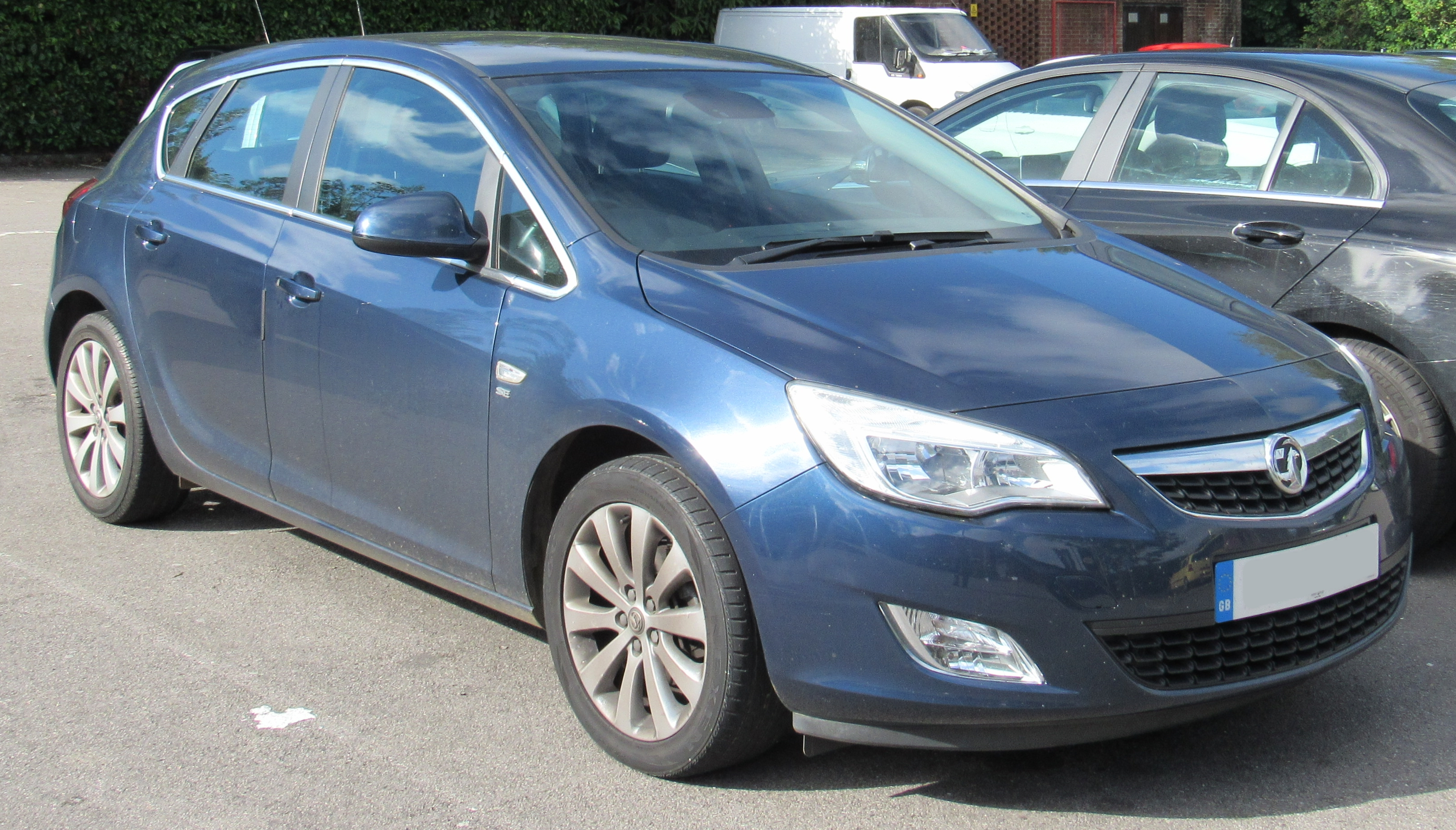
Vauxhall Astra Mark 6 Front (pre-facelift)

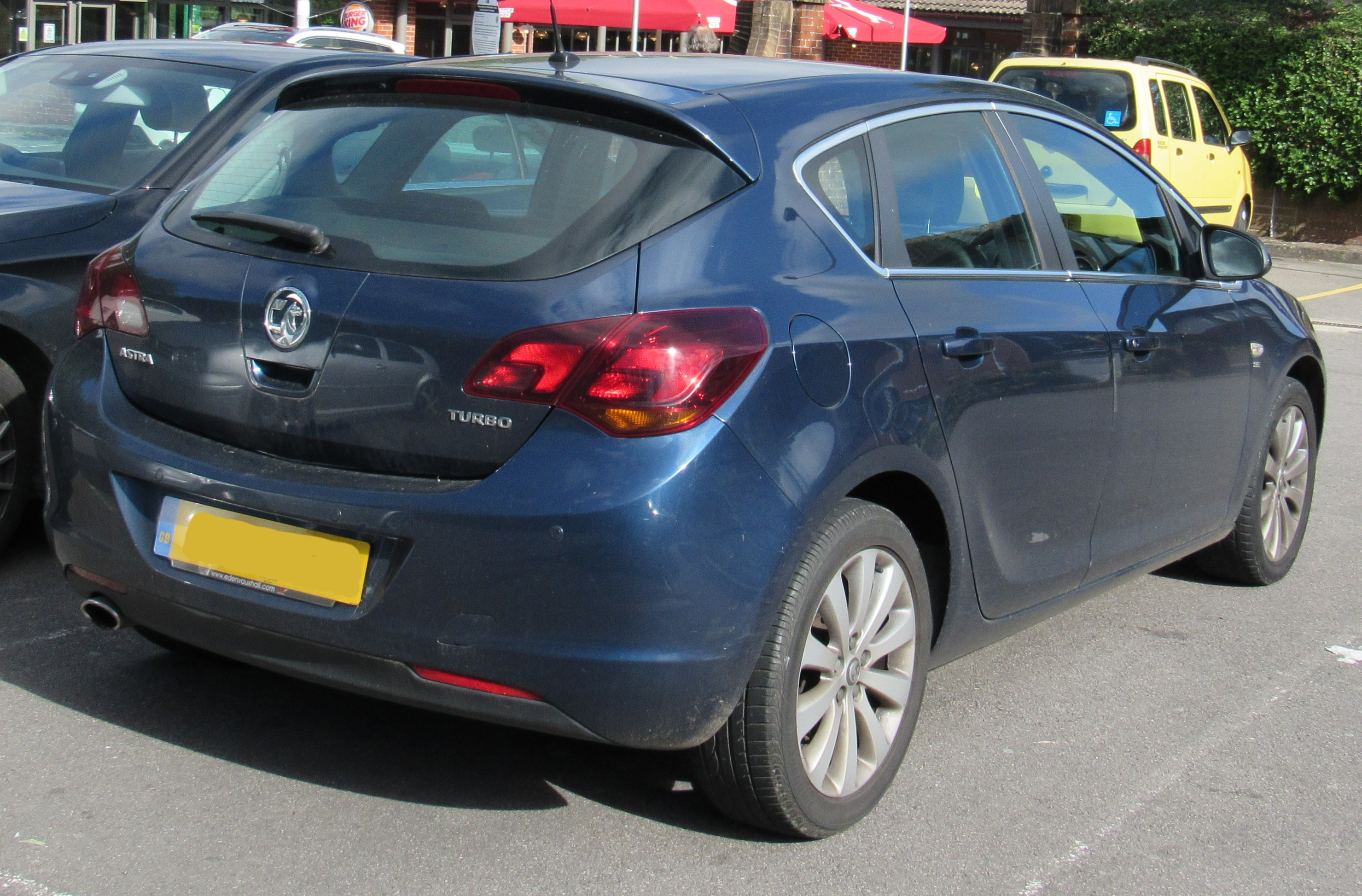
Vauxhall Astra Mk6 Rear (pre-facelift)

The Vauxhall Astra J was officially unveiled at the 2009 Frankfurt Motor Show and was available to purchase from late 2009. The principal manufacturing plant was at Ellesmere Port, enabling the manufacturer to benefit from sterling depreciation with this model. The Astra J's design is heavily influenced by that of the Vauxhall Insignia.

Despite being more expensive than the Astra H, the Astra J has been a strong sales success in the UK, where it was the best-selling car in June 2010 with well over 10,000 sales. It outsold its primary rival, the Ford Focus, by nearly 50%, though this was in part due to production of the Mk2 Focus being scaled back prior to the launch of a new MK3 model in early 2011.

The estate version of the Astra, the 'Sports Tourer', debuted at the 2010 Paris Motor Show and went on sale shortly afterwards, with a starting price of £16,575 for the ES version. Other variants included the Exclusiv, SRI and SE versions, with the SE costing from £20,345.

In BBC2's Top Gear, the Astra Mark 6 in the Tech Line trim was used as their fourth "Reasonably Priced Car".

== Seventh generation (2016–2021) ==
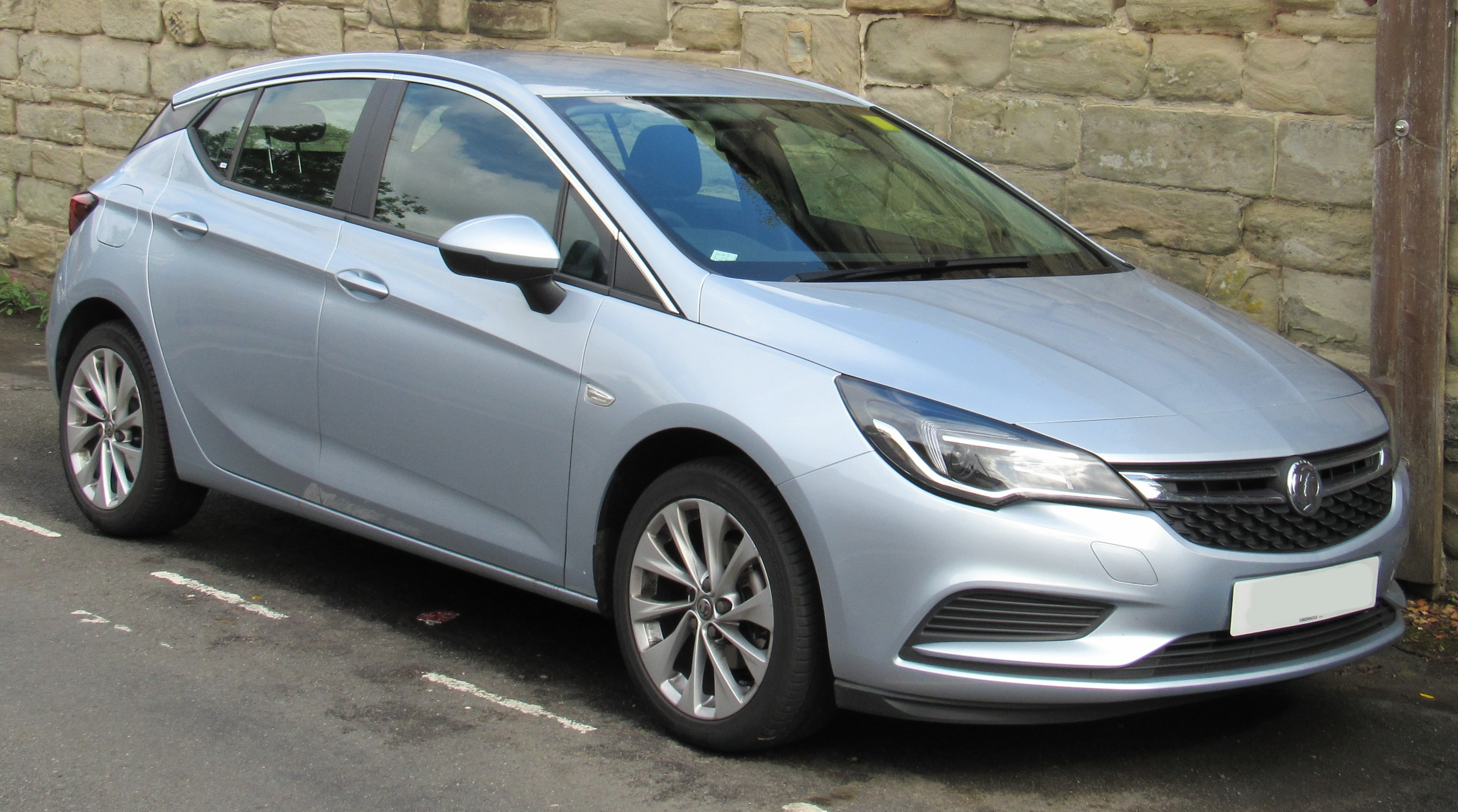
2017 Vauxhall Astra Design Mk7

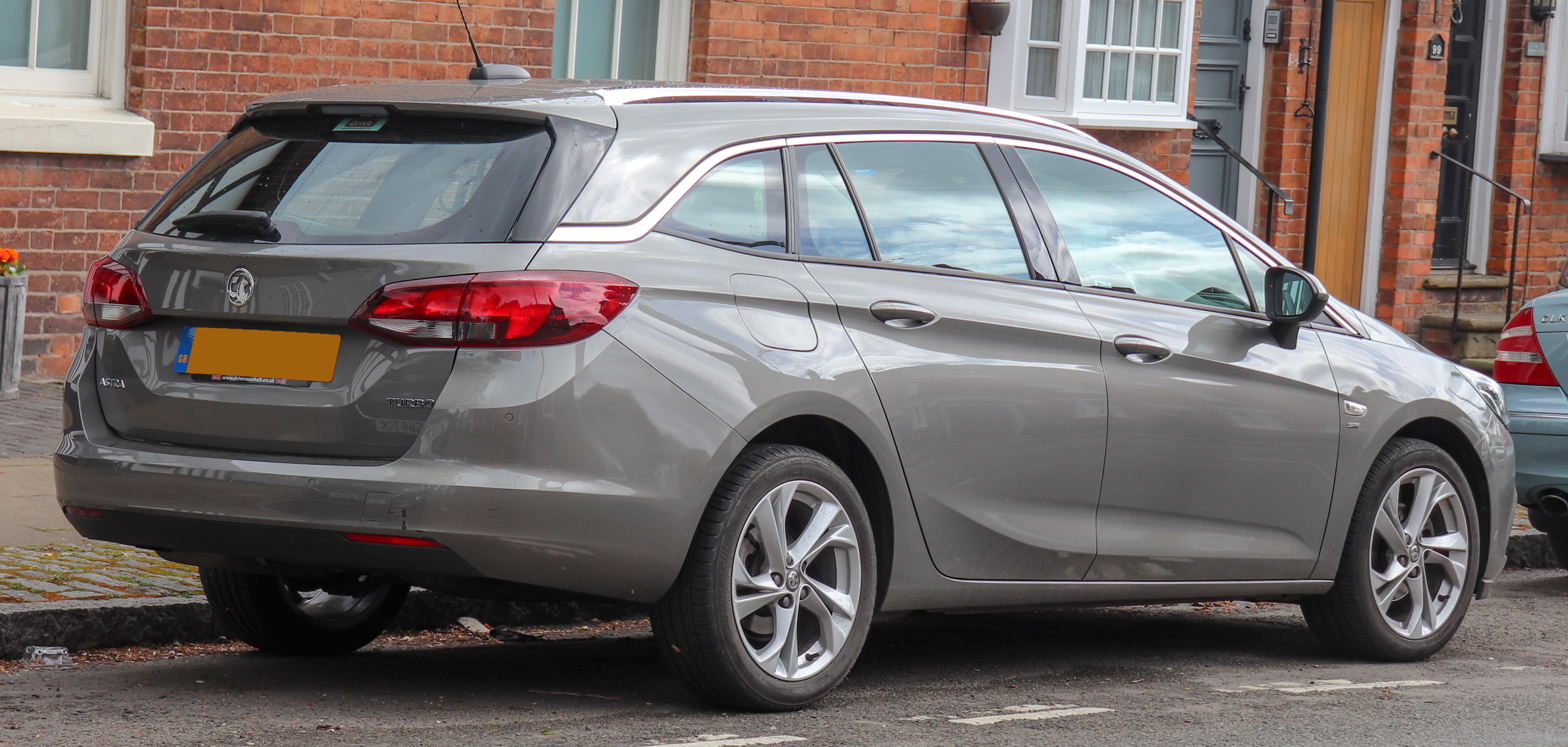
2017 Vauxhall Astra SRi Mk7 Estate

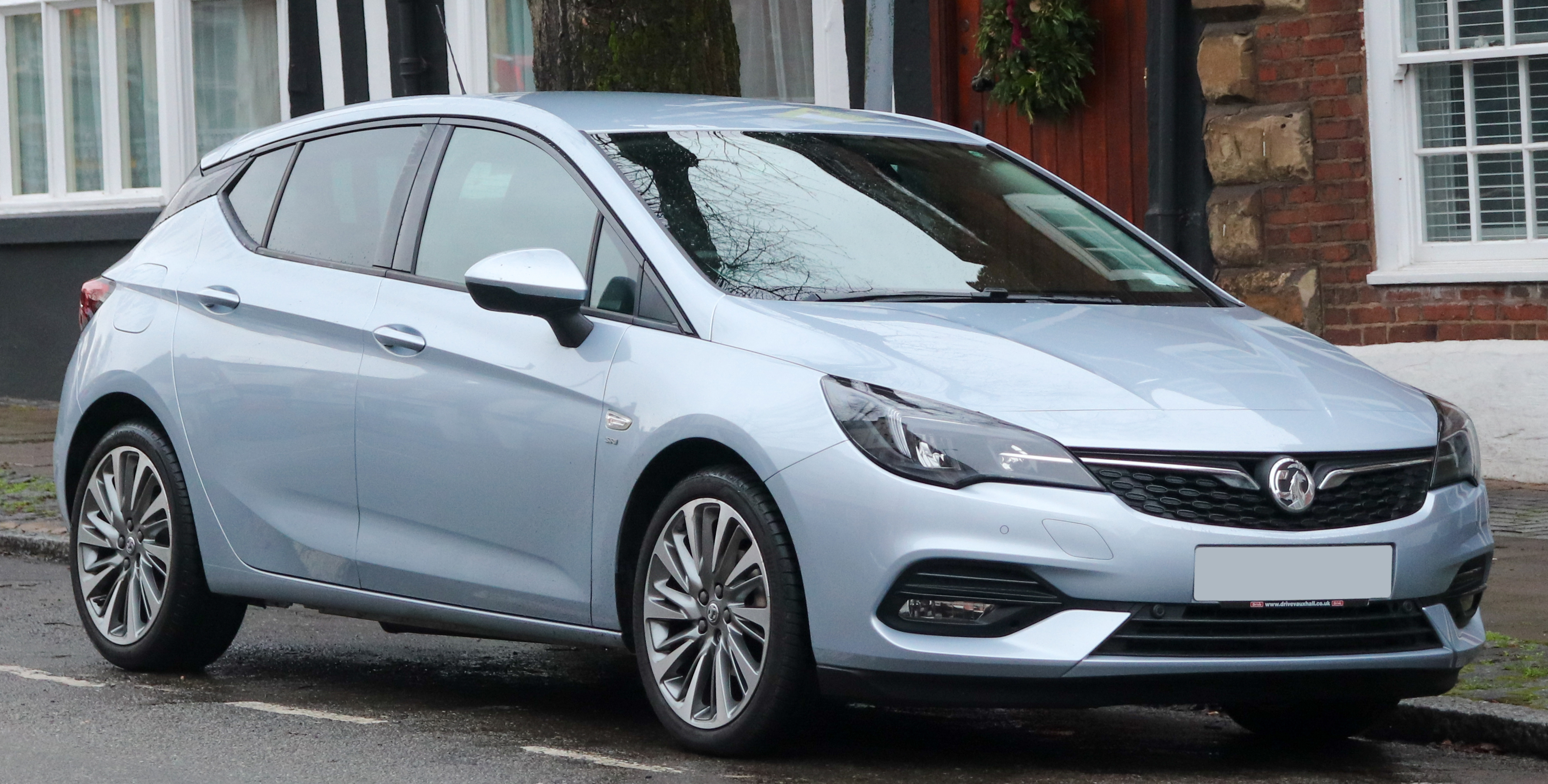
2020 Vauxhall Astra SRi VX Line facelift

The seventh generation Astra was launched at the Frankfurt Motor Show, in September 2015. A totally new design, the car is 200 kg lighter than its predecessor. It features a newly developed 1 litre 3 cylinder petrol engine. A special feature is the "OnStar" system, which allows the driver to call for assistance with an inbuilt dial.

== Eighth generation (2021–) ==
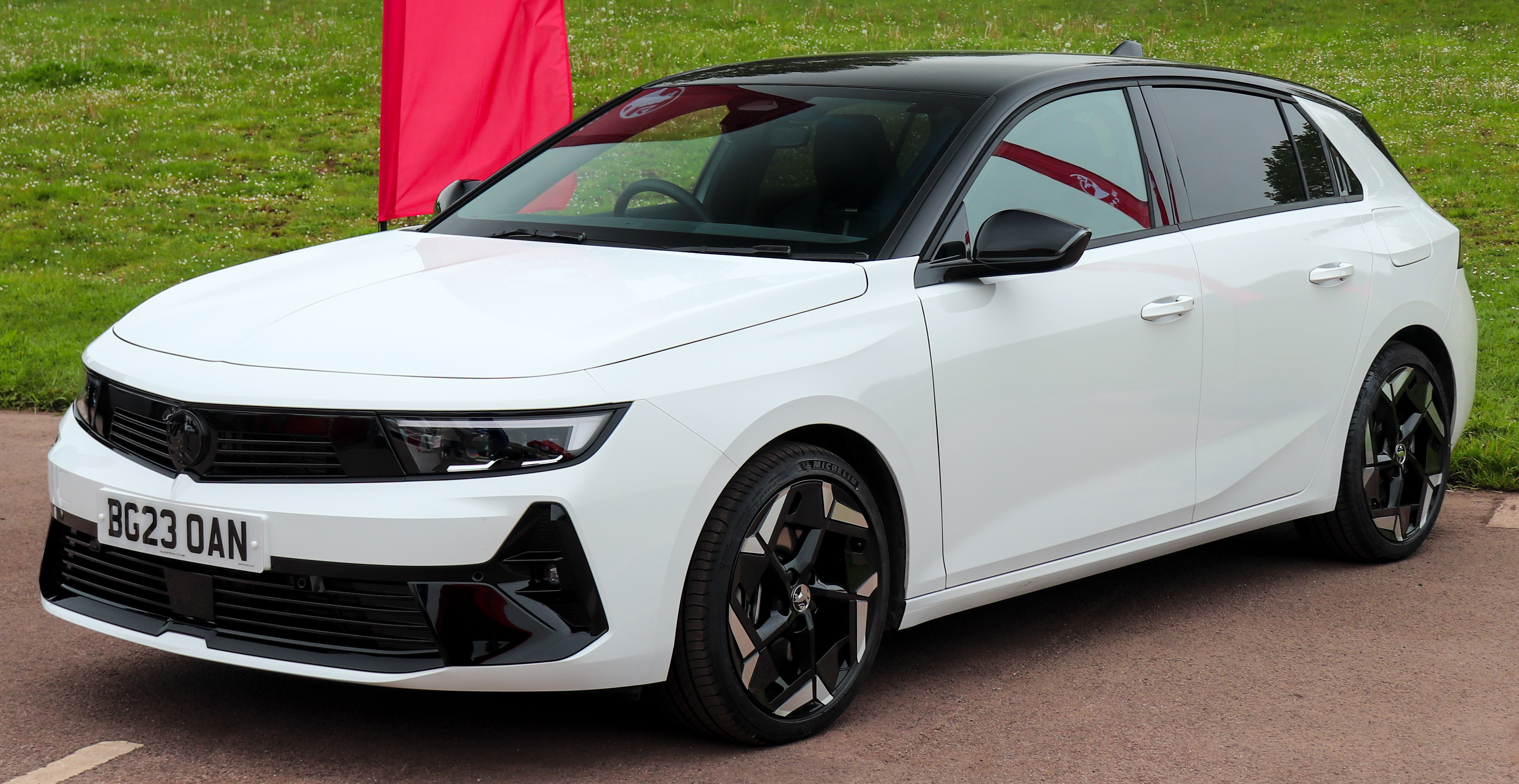
Vauxhall Astra GSE

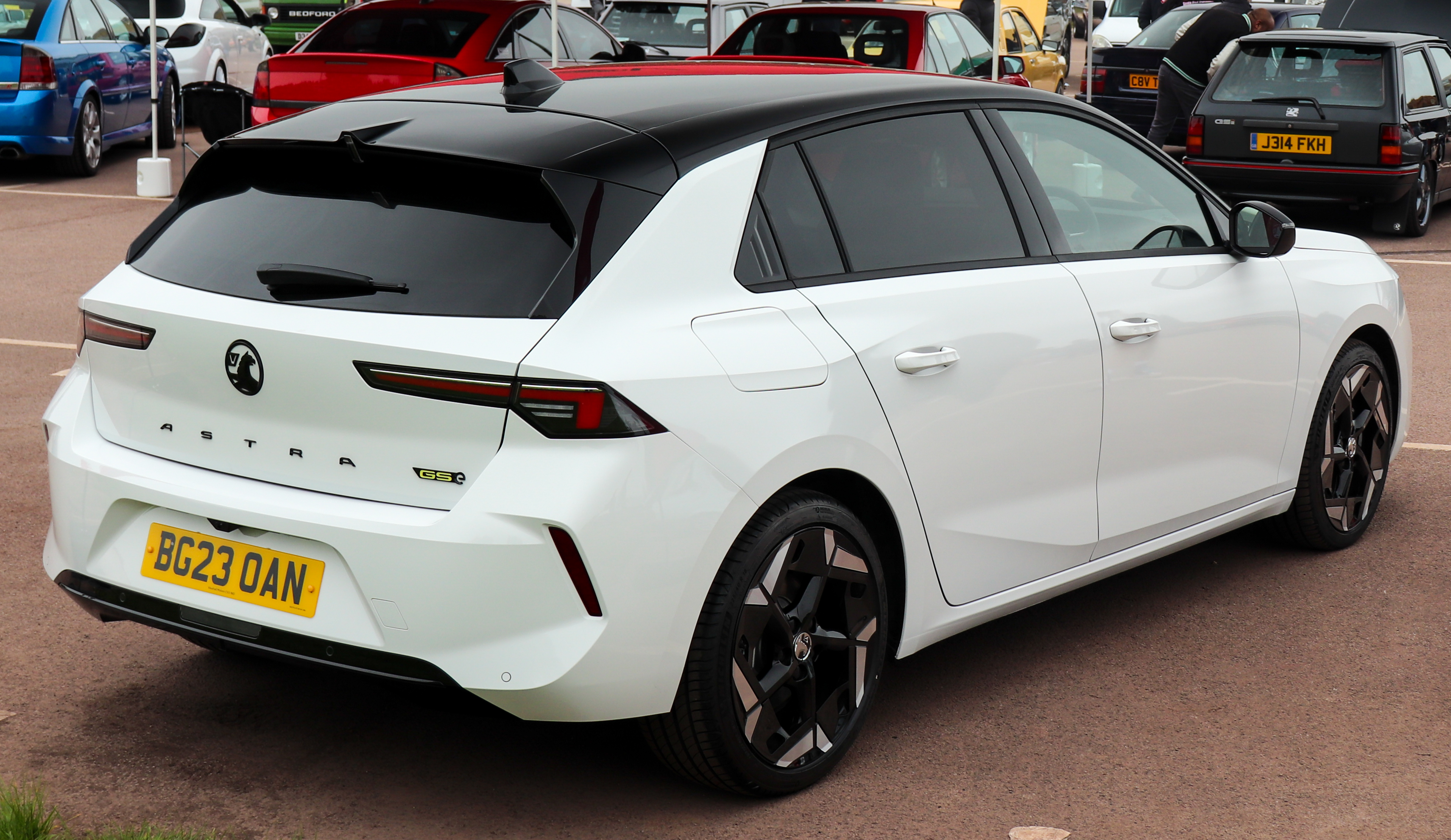
Vauxhall Astra GSE

The eighth generation Astra, which is derived from the Opel Astra L, was unveiled on 13 July 2021 and went on sale on 12 November 2021. The vehicle is based on the third-generation of the EMP2 platform which made its wheelbase grow by 55 mm (2.2 in). It will be offered as a hybrid for the first time and will unveil a 180-horsepower engine. The 225 horsepower version, taken from the Peugeot 508 and Peugeot 3008, will also be available on the GT version.

== Sales ==
The MK1 Astra was a strong seller in the United Kingdom, and quickly established itself as Britain's second most popular small family car, but was never able to match the sales success of the Ford Escort.

The MK2 Astra was a bigger seller than its predecessor, though again it failed to match the Ford Escort in terms of sales success. It further widened the gap between Vauxhall and rival products from Austin Rover, although the combined sales of ARG's Rover 200 and Austin Maestro ranges were often at least a match for the Astra's total sales.

The MK3 Astra further narrowed the gap with the Ford Escort.

The MK4 Astra was, by 2001, the second best selling car in Britain overall, behind the Ford Focus. Combined sales of Opel and Vauxhall Astra G made it the 26th most popular car in the world, with a total production of 3,799,015.

The MK5 was the most successful version of the Astra. It was Britain's second-best selling car in 2005, 2006 and 2007, further narrowing the gap between itself and the market–leading Ford Focus.

In March 2009, nearly 2,500,000 Astras had been sold over five generations since its launch 30 years earlier, making it the fourth most popular car ever sold in Britain, with 90,641 sold in 2009.

For 2010, it was Britain's second-best selling new car with 80,646 sold. It was only outsold by the smaller Ford Fiesta, and finally managed to outsell the Ford Focus, and end Ford's lead of the small family car market after 37 years. Sales were down to 62,575 in 2011, becoming the fifth most popular new car in Britain.

Many British police forces use the Astra as a panda car. The MK6 was used by 54 constabularies.

== Motorsport ==
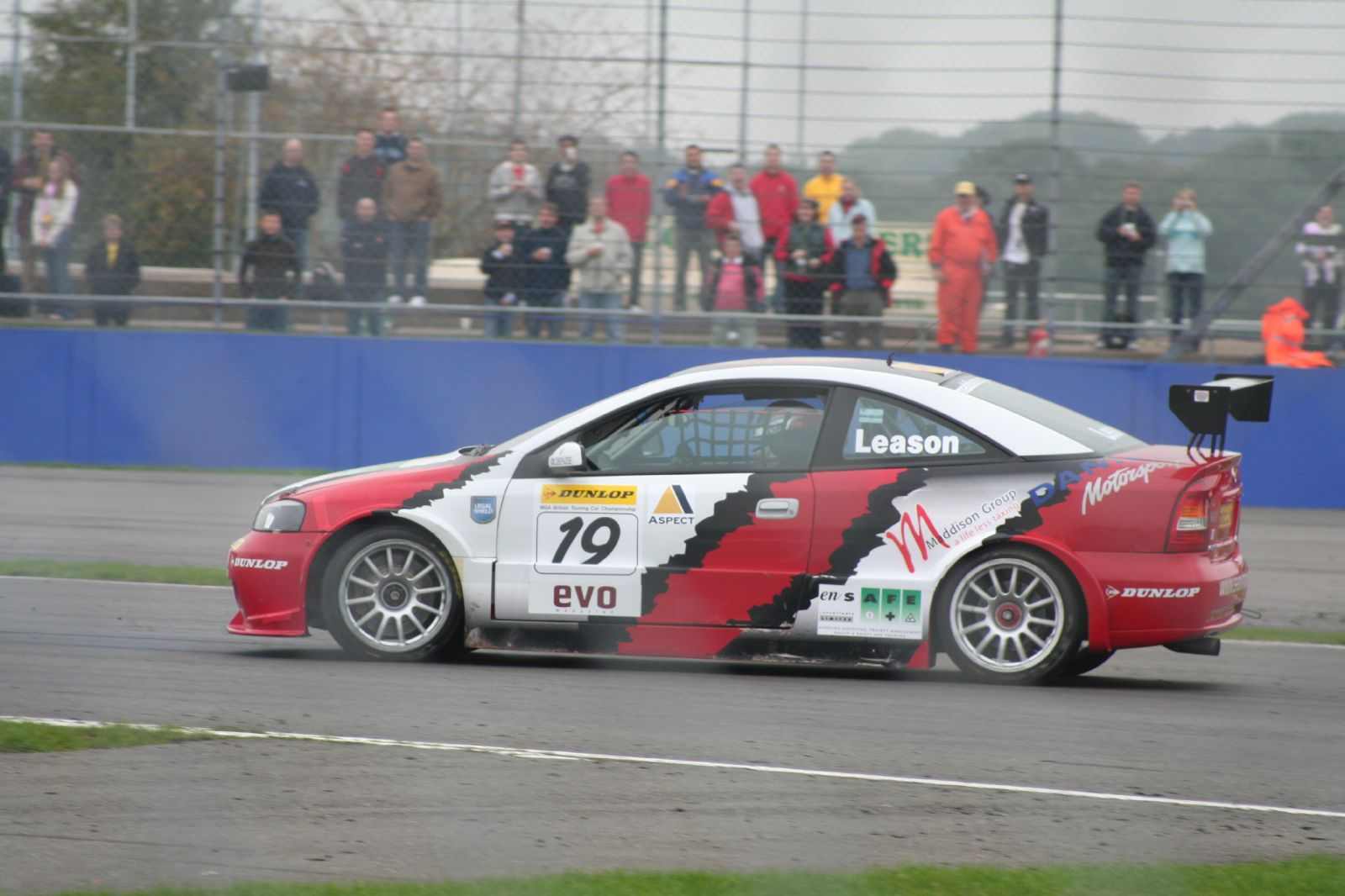
Vauxhall Astra Coupe at the BTCC Silverstone 2006

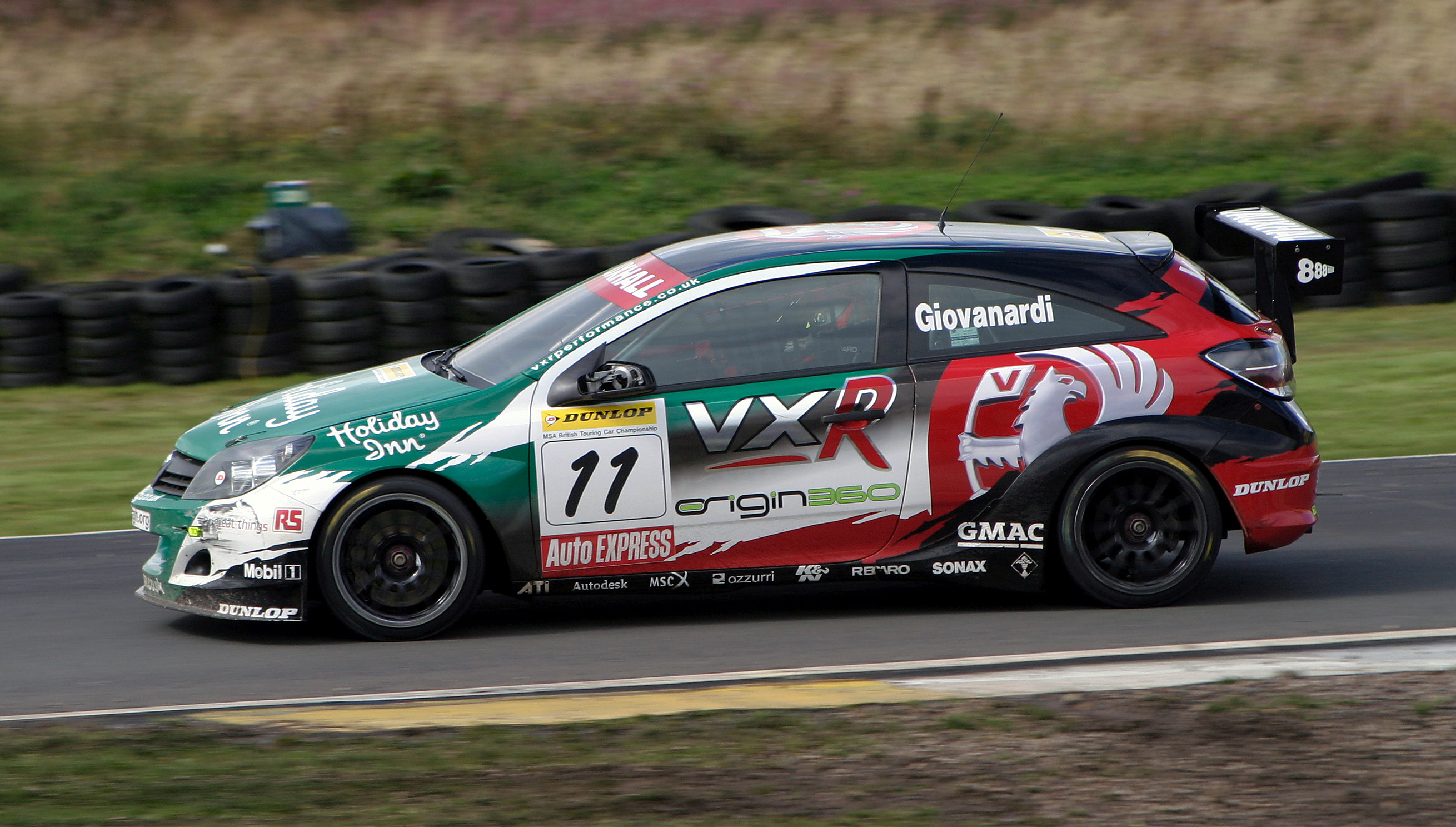
Vauxhall Mark 5 Astra Sport Hatch at the BTCC Knockhill 2008

The Astra has been used in auto racing around the globe, in particular in touring car racing. Its highest success were achieved in the British Touring Car Championship (see BTC-T Vauxhall Astra Coupe). The Astra Coupe replaced the Vectra in the BTCC after the regulations changed in 2001 and immediately became a successful car in British Touring Car Championship taking both first and second in the drivers championship in 2001 with Jason Plato, 2002 and 2004 with James Thompson and 2003 with Yvan Muller. The Astra Coupe was able to also take the Teams and Manufacturers Championships at the same time between 2001 and 2004. During its 4 years in the hands of the works VX Racing team it was almost invincible taking 62 wins. After 2004, it was decided that Vauxhall would retire the Astra Coupe and move on to the Mark 5 Astra Sport Hatch for the next two years. Due to the reliability and speed of the Astra Coupe, they were used by many independent teams such as GA Motorsport, Collards Motorsport, Thurlby Motors and Arkas Racing for the next few years with one car entered in 2009 and 2010 by Martin Johnson. The newer cars struggled to match the coupe's pace and were beaten by the Hondas and SEATs on many occasions. Yvan Muller was runner-up and Colin Turkington sixth in 2005. In 2006 Yvan Muller moved to the World Touring Car Championship while Colin Turkington moved back to MG. They were replaced by Fabrizio Giovanardi who finished fifth overall and gave Vauxhall its 100th BTCC win, Gavin Smith seventh and Tom Chilton eighth. For 2007, VX Racing dropped the Astra in favour of the Vectra C and reduced to two cars. Fabrizio Giovanardi and Tom Chilton drove for the team in 2007.

The BTC-T Vauxhall Astra Coupe was a car that won 25 out of 26 races in the 2001 British Touring Car Championship. The Astra 4S finished fourth in the final round of the 1986 British Rally Championship.

The Astra GTE won the 1989 British Touring Car Championship with John Cleland.

== Awards ==
The Vauxhall Astra VXR won Best Sporting Car at the Scottish Car of the Year Awards in 2012, presented in Glasgow on 14 October 2012.
