= Bert Taylor =

Bert Taylor or Tayler may refer to:

- Bert Leston Taylor (1866–1921), American writer
- Bert Tayler (1887–1984), English cricketer
- Bertram Taylor (Royal Navy officer) (1906-1970), British admiral
- Bert Taylor (footballer, born 1900) (Gilbert Roy Taylor, 1900-1980), Australian rules footballer for Fitzroy and coach of Geelong
- Bert Taylor (footballer, born 1911) (Albert Ernest Taylor, 1911-1978), Australian footballer for Melbourne
- Bert Taylor (footballer, born 1924) (Albert Herbert Taylor, 1924-2011), English footballer, see List of Bury F.C. players (1–24 appearances)
- Bert Taylor, who runs BTC Racing

== See also ==
- Albert Taylor (disambiguation)
- Robert Taylor (disambiguation)
- Herbert Taylor (disambiguation)
- Hubert G. Taylor, politician from New York
