= Albert Taylor =

Albert or Al Taylor may refer to:

- Albert Wilder Taylor (1875–1945), American journalist in Korea
- Albert Taylor (diver) (1882–1932), British Olympic diver
- Albert Taylor (rower) (1911–1988), Canadian rower
- Albert H. Taylor (1879–1961), American electrical engineer
- Albert Davis Taylor (1883–1951), American landscape architect
- Bert Leston Taylor (1866–1921), American columnist, humorist, poet, and author
- Albert Pierce Taylor (1872–1931), American archivist and journalist
- Albert Taylor (cricketer) (1894–1960), English cricketer
- Albert R. Taylor (1846–1929), American educator
- Albert Taylor (trade unionist) (1877–1947), British trade unionist and political activist
- Al Taylor (actor) (1887–1951), American character actor

== See also ==
- Bert Taylor (disambiguation)
- Alfred Taylor
