= Alfred Taylor =

Alfred Taylormay refer to:

- Alfred A. Taylor (1848–1931), U.S. congressman and governor of Tennessee
- Alfred Taylor (British Army officer) (1862–1941), soldier and member of parliament, Rhodesia
- J. Alfred Taylor (1878–1956), U.S. representative from West Virginia
- Alfred Edward Taylor (1869–1945), British idealist philosopher
- Alf Taylor (cricketer) (1891–?), English cricketer
- Alfred Taylor (cricketer) (1944–2009), Barbadian cricketer
- Alfred Dundas Taylor (1825–1898), civil architect to the Admiralty in the UK
- Alfred Swaine Taylor (1806–1880), English toxicologist and medical writer
- Alfred Taylor (wrestler) (1889–1966), British Olympic wrestler
- Alfred Taylor (rugby union)
- Alfred Taylor (cinematographer), worked on the 1974 film The Teacher
- Alfred Taylor (comics); see Knockout (UK comics)
- Al Taylor (politician), member of the New York State Assembly

== See also ==
- Alfie Taylor (born 2004), English footballer
