= 2020 British Touring Car Championship =

63rd season of the British Touring Car Championship

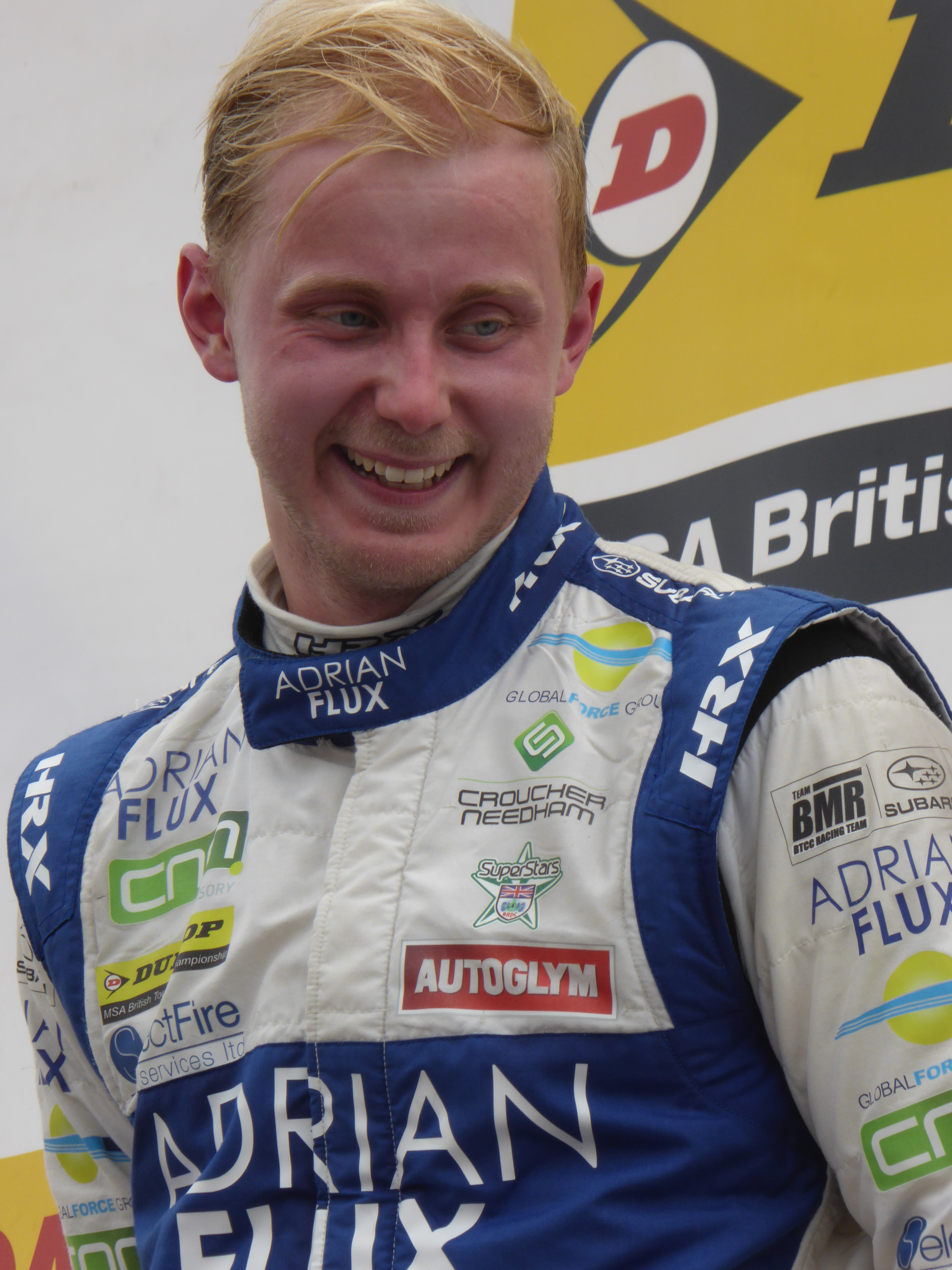
Ashley Sutton won the Drivers' Championship by 14 points.

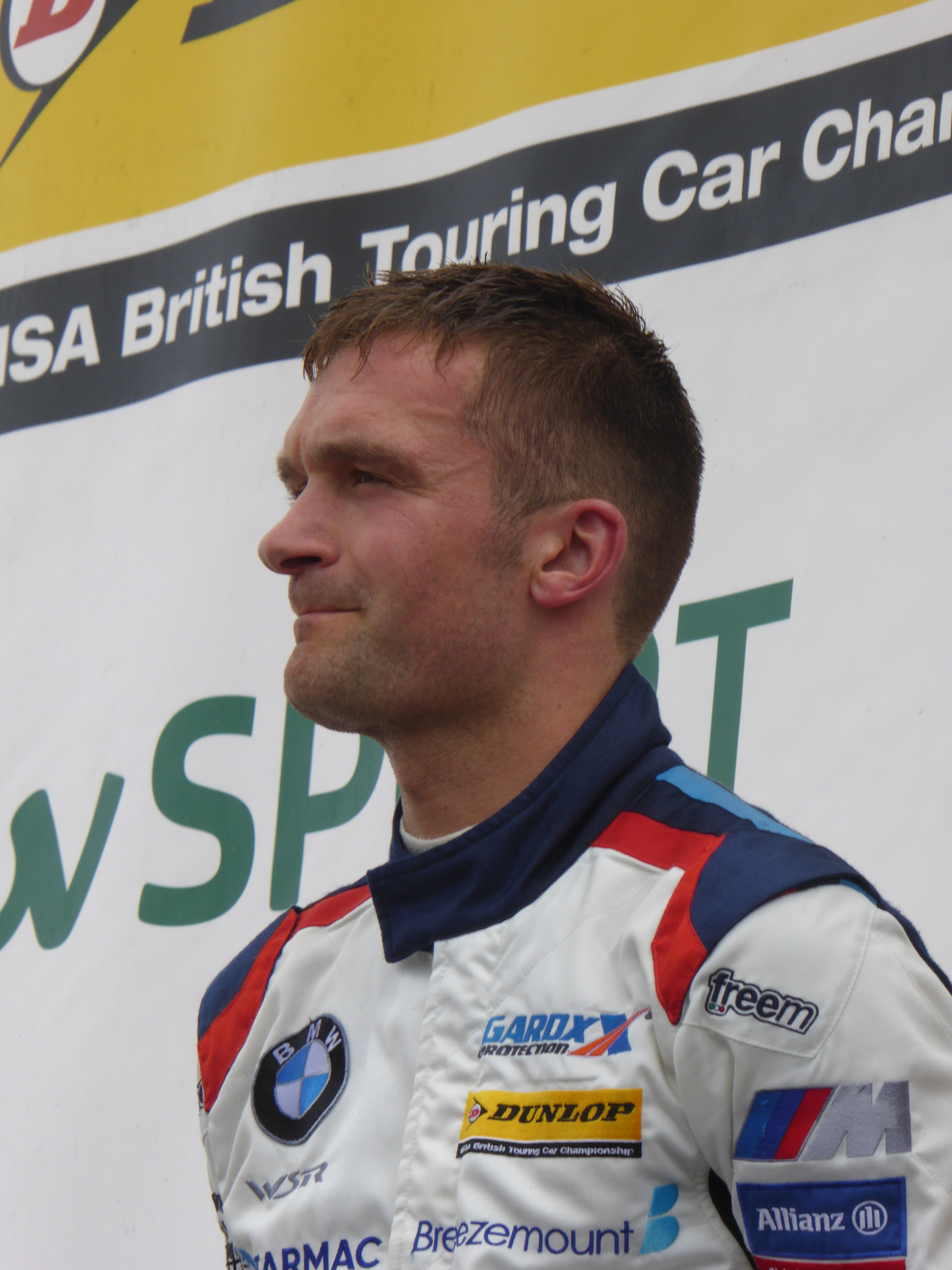
Colin Turkington finished second in the Drivers' Championship.

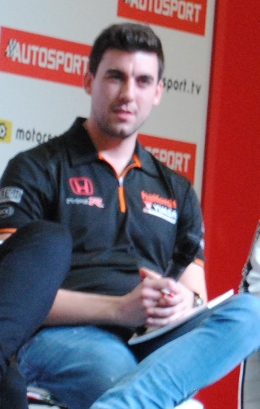
Dan Cammish finished third in the championship, 2 points behind Colin Turkington.

The 2020 Kwik Fit British Touring Car Championship (commonly abbreviated as BTCC) was a motor racing championship for production-based touring cars held across England and Scotland. The championship featured a mix of professional motor racing teams and privately funded amateur drivers competing in highly modified versions of family cars which are sold to the general public and conform to the technical regulations for the championship. The 2020 season was the 63rd British Touring Car Championship season and the tenth season for cars conforming to the Next Generation Touring Car (NGTC) technical specification. The Championship was won by Ashley Sutton.

== Teams and drivers ==
Team	Car	Engine	No.	Drivers	Rounds
Constructor Entries
Team BMW	BMW 330i M Sport	BMW/Neil Brown	1	(United Kingdom) Colin Turkington	All
Team BMW	BMW 330i M Sport	BMW/Neil Brown	15	(United Kingdom) Tom Oliphant	All
Halfords Yuasa Racing	Honda Civic Type R (FK8)	Honda/Neil Brown	25	(United Kingdom) Matt Neal	All
Halfords Yuasa Racing	Honda Civic Type R (FK8)	Honda/Neil Brown	27	(United Kingdom) Dan Cammish	All
Toyota Gazoo Racing UK with Ginsters	Toyota Corolla	TOCA/Swindon	80	(United Kingdom) Tom Ingram	All
Independent Entries
BTC Racing	Honda Civic Type R (FK8)	Honda/Neil Brown	3	(United Kingdom) Tom Chilton	All
BTC Racing	Honda Civic Type R (FK8)	Honda/Neil Brown	66	(United Kingdom) Josh Cook	All
The Clever Baggers with BTC Racing	Honda Civic Type R (FK8)	Honda/Neil Brown	777	(United Kingdom) Michael Crees	All
MB Motorsport accelerated by Blue Square	Honda Civic Type R (FK2)	TOCA/Swindon	4	(United Kingdom) Sam Osborne	All
MB Motorsport accelerated by Blue Square	Honda Civic Type R (FK2)	TOCA/Swindon	24	(United Kingdom) Jake Hill	All
GKR TradePriceCars.com	Audi S3 Saloon	TOCA/Swindon	19	(United Kingdom) Bobby Thompson	1–7
GKR TradePriceCars.com	Audi S3 Saloon	TOCA/Swindon	23	(United Kingdom) Ethan Hammerton	8–9
GKR TradePriceCars.com	Audi S3 Saloon	TOCA/Swindon	180	(United Kingdom) James Gornall	1–6
GKR TradePriceCars.com	Audi S3 Saloon	TOCA/Swindon	222	(United Kingdom) Paul Rivett	8–9
Motorbase Performance	Ford Focus ST Mk.IV	Ford/Mountune	6	(United Kingdom) Rory Butcher	All
Motorbase Performance	Ford Focus ST Mk.IV	Ford/Mountune	44	(United Kingdom) Andy Neate	All
Motorbase Performance	Ford Focus ST Mk.IV	Ford/Mountune	48	(United Kingdom) Ollie Jackson	All
Power Maxed Car Care Racing	Vauxhall Astra	TOCA/Swindon	9	(United Kingdom) Jade Edwards	6
Power Maxed Car Care Racing	Vauxhall Astra	TOCA/Swindon	10	(United Kingdom) Rob Austin	5
Power Maxed Car Care Racing	Vauxhall Astra	TOCA/Swindon	29	(United Kingdom) Jac Constable	7
Power Maxed Car Care Racing	Vauxhall Astra	TOCA/Swindon	39	(United Kingdom) Jessica Hawkins	8
Power Maxed Car Care Racing	Vauxhall Astra	TOCA/Swindon	49	(United Kingdom) Bradley Philpot	9
Power Maxed Car Care Racing	Vauxhall Astra	TOCA/Swindon	21	(United Kingdom) Mike Bushell	3–4
RCIB Insurance with Fox Transport	Volkswagen CC	TOCA/Swindon	21	(United Kingdom) Mike Bushell	7
RCIB Insurance with Fox Transport	Volkswagen CC	TOCA/Swindon	8	(United Kingdom) Tom Onslow-Cole	5–6
RCIB Insurance with Fox Transport	Volkswagen CC	TOCA/Swindon	31	(United Kingdom) Jack Goff	All
RCIB Insurance with Fox Transport	Volkswagen CC	TOCA/Swindon	34	(United Kingdom) Ollie Brown	1–3
RCIB Insurance with Fox Transport	Volkswagen CC	TOCA/Swindon	88	(United Kingdom) Glynn Geddie	8–9
ROKiT Racing with Team HARD	Volkswagen CC	TOCA/Swindon	28	(United Kingdom) Nicolas Hamilton	1–3, 5–9
HUB Financial Solutions with Team HARD	BMW 125i M Sport	BMW/Neil Brown	41	(United Kingdom) Carl Boardley	All
Team Parker Racing	BMW 125i M Sport	BMW/Neil Brown	12	(United Kingdom) Stephen Jelley	All
Laser Tools Racing	Infiniti Q50	TOCA/Swindon	16	(United Kingdom) Aiden Moffat	All
Laser Tools Racing	Infiniti Q50	TOCA/Swindon	116	(United Kingdom) Ashley Sutton	All
Excelr8 Motorsport	Hyundai i30 Fastback N Performance	TOCA/Swindon	18	(United Kingdom) Senna Proctor	All
Excelr8 Motorsport	Hyundai i30 Fastback N Performance	TOCA/Swindon	22	(United Kingdom) Chris Smiley	All
Carlube TripleR Racing with Mac Tools	Mercedes-Benz A-Class	TOCA/Swindon	32	(United Kingdom) Jack Butel	All
Carlube TripleR Racing with Mac Tools	Mercedes-Benz A-Class	TOCA/Swindon	33	(United Kingdom) Adam Morgan	All

Key
Eligible for the Jack Sears Trophy for drivers yet to record an overall podium finish or Jack Sears Trophy championship at the start of the season.

=== Driver changes ===
Entering/re-entering BTCC

- 2019 Mini Challenge UK winner James Gornall debuted with TradePriceCars.com.
- Andy Neate returned to the series after having last raced in 2016 for Halfords Yuasa Racing, driving a third car for Motorbase Performance.
- Ollie Brown debuted with Team HARD.
- Jack Butel debuted for Ciceley Motorsport.
- Tom Onslow-Cole returned to the series after having last raced in 2013 for Team HARD and Airwaves Racing, rejoins Team HARD to replace Ollie Brown who was injured at Oulton Park.
- Former Renault Clio Cup United Kingdom racer Jade Edwards debuted with Power Maxed Car Care Racing.
- Rob Austin returned to the series after having last raced in 2018 for DUO Motorsport with HMS Racing, driving the car for Power Maxed Car Care Racing at Thruxton.
- Four-time Renault Clio Cup UK champion Paul Rivett debuted with GKR TradePriceCars.com.
- Jac Constable was supposed to debut for Power Maxed Car Care Racing at Croft but withdrew from the race meeting on medical grounds.
- Jessica Hawkins debuted for Power Maxed Car Care Racing at Snetterton.
- Glynn Geddie returned to the series after having last raced in 2018 for AmD Essex.
- Bradley Philpot debuted for Power Maxed Car Care Racing at Brands Hatch.

Changed teams

- Ashley Sutton moved from Team BMR to Laser Tools Racing.
- Jake Hill moved from TradePriceCars.com to MB Motorsport.
- Bobby Thompson moved from Team HARD to TradePriceCars.com.
- Sam Osborne moved from Excelr8 Motorsport to MB Motorsport.
- Tom Chilton moved from Motorbase Performance to BTC Racing.
- Senna Proctor moved from Team BMR to Excelr8 Motorsport.
- Michael Crees moved from Team HARD to BTC Racing.
- Rory Butcher moved from AmDTuning.com to Motorbase Performance.
- Chris Smiley moved from BTC Racing to Excelr8 Motorsport.
- Nicolas Hamilton moved from Motorbase Performance to Team HARD.

Leaving BTCC

- Mark Blundell left the series to become sporting director of MB Motorsport.
- Rob Collard left the series to drive in the British GT Championship.
- Rob Smith left the series after losing his drive at Excelr8 Motorsport to Chris Smiley.
- Matt Simpson left the series to support his son's karting career.
- Daniel Rowbottom left the series after losing his drive at Ciceley Motorsport to Jack Butel.

=== Team changes ===
- Subaru will not enter a manufacturer team in the series after their four-year agreement with Team BMR ended at the end of the 2019 season. Team BMR would rebrand as BMR Engineering to design cars for other teams. BMR Engineering later entered a technical partnership with Laser Tools Racing, which allowed them to expand to a two-car entry for 2020.
- Excelr8 Motorsport switched from running the MG6 GT to the Hyundai i30 Fastback N Performance.
- BTC Racing will expand from a two-car entry to a three-car entry for 2020.
- Team HARD. switched from running one of their Volkswagen CCs to an ex-West Surrey Racing BMW 125i M Sport.
- AmDTuning.com became Mark Blundell Motorsport with Mark Blundell as sporting director.
- Motorbase Performance switched from running the third generation Ford Focus RS to the newer fourth generation Ford Focus ST.

=== Changes related to the COVID-19 pandemic ===
- Power Maxed Racing originally intended to enter the 2020 season as a works team, fielding two Vauxhall Astra cars for Jason Plato and Mat Jackson, but elected to take a sabbatical from the series due to the pandemic with a view to return in 2021. The team would later make a return to the series as an independent team from Oulton Park onwards, fielding a single Astra for drivers on one-off basis.
- Andrew Jordan withdrew from the series following funding issues caused as a result of the COVID-19 pandemic. Team BMW elected to not seek a replacement driver, and effectively slimmed down from running three cars to running only two.
- Mike Bushell initially signed with Team HARD, but later withdrew from the series initially due to health issues and later as a result of the COVID-19 pandemic. Bushell later returned at the rounds at Oulton Park and Knockhill for Power Maxed Racing and at Croft he replaced Tom Onslow-Cole in Team HARD.
- Howard Fuller, who competed sporadically for Team HARD in the 2012 and 2013 BTCC Seasons, was initially hired to stand in for Bushell but was replaced by Ollie Brown by the time the delayed season started.

== Race calendar ==
The revised championship calendar was announced by the championship organisers on 27 April 2020. All races will be held in the United Kingdom. Original calendar was announced on 16 June 2019, but was revised due to the COVID-19 pandemic.

2020 BTCC Race Locations

Round		Circuit	Date
1	R1	Donington Park (National Circuit, Leicestershire)	1–2 August
1	R2	Donington Park (National Circuit, Leicestershire)	1–2 August
1	R3	Donington Park (National Circuit, Leicestershire)	1–2 August
2	R4	Brands Hatch (Grand Prix Circuit, Kent)	8–9 August
2	R5	Brands Hatch (Grand Prix Circuit, Kent)	8–9 August
2	R6	Brands Hatch (Grand Prix Circuit, Kent)	8–9 August
3	R7	Oulton Park (Island Circuit, Cheshire)	22–23 August
3	R8	Oulton Park (Island Circuit, Cheshire)	22–23 August
3	R9	Oulton Park (Island Circuit, Cheshire)	22–23 August
4	R10	Knockhill Racing Circuit (Fife)	29–30 August
4	R11	Knockhill Racing Circuit (Fife)	29–30 August
4	R12	Knockhill Racing Circuit (Fife)	29–30 August
5	R13	Thruxton Circuit (Hampshire)	19–20 September
5	R14	Thruxton Circuit (Hampshire)	19–20 September
5	R15	Thruxton Circuit (Hampshire)	19–20 September
6	R16	Silverstone Circuit (National Circuit, Northamptonshire)	26–27 September
6	R17	Silverstone Circuit (National Circuit, Northamptonshire)	26–27 September
6	R18	Silverstone Circuit (National Circuit, Northamptonshire)	26–27 September
7	R19	Croft Circuit (North Yorkshire)	10–11 October
7	R20	Croft Circuit (North Yorkshire)	10–11 October
7	R21	Croft Circuit (North Yorkshire)	10–11 October
8	R22	Snetterton Motor Racing Circuit (300 Circuit, Norfolk)	24–25 October
8	R23	Snetterton Motor Racing Circuit (300 Circuit, Norfolk)	24–25 October
8	R24	Snetterton Motor Racing Circuit (300 Circuit, Norfolk)	24–25 October
9	R25	Brands Hatch (Indy Circuit, Kent)	14–15 November
9	R26	Brands Hatch (Indy Circuit, Kent)	14–15 November
9	R27	Brands Hatch (Indy Circuit, Kent)	14–15 November
Cancelled due to the 2019-20 coronavirus pandemic
Silverstone Circuit (International Circuit, Northamptonshire)			26-27 September

== Rule changes ==
=== Technical changes ===
- Goodyear is set to become the series' tyre supplier, replacing Dunlop. It will be the first time since the 2002 season that Dunlop does not supply the series with tyres.

=== Qualifying changes ===
- A new qualifying format of one twenty-five-minute session and a second, ten-minute, qualifying session, in which the top ten in Q1 will set lap times, determining the first ten spaces on the grid. This will be trialled at Snetterton

=== Support series changes ===
- The Renault UK Clio Cup, which has been part of the TOCA support package since 2000, will leave the BTCC support package and will instead support the British GT Championship. It will be replaced by the Mini Challenge.
- The new Porsche Sprint Challenge GB, made up of Porsche 718 Cayman GT4 Clubsport cars, will support the Silverstone National and Croft rounds.

== Results ==
Round		Circuit	Pole position	Fastest lap	Winning driver	Winning team	Winning independent	Winning JST
1	R1	Donington Park	Colin Turkington	Ashley Sutton	Dan Cammish	Halfords Yuasa Racing	Rory Butcher	Sam Osborne
1	R2	Donington Park		Ashley Sutton	Colin Turkington	Team BMW	Rory Butcher	Michael Crees
1	R3	Donington Park		Ashley Sutton	Ashley Sutton	Laser Tools Racing	Ashley Sutton	Michael Crees
2	R4	Brands Hatch GP	Rory Butcher	Josh Cook	Dan Cammish	Halfords Yuasa Racing	Ollie Jackson	Michael Crees
2	R5	Brands Hatch GP		Tom Ingram	Colin Turkington	Team BMW	Ashley Sutton	James Gornall
2	R6	Brands Hatch GP		Josh Cook	Tom Oliphant	Team BMW	Ashley Sutton	James Gornall
3	R7	Oulton Park	Rory Butcher	Tom Ingram	Rory Butcher	Motorbase Performance	Rory Butcher	Michael Crees
3	R8	Oulton Park		Ashley Sutton	Ashley Sutton	Laser Tools Racing	Ashley Sutton	Bobby Thompson
3	R9	Oulton Park		Colin Turkington	Adam Morgan	Carlube TripleR Racing with Mac Tools	Adam Morgan	Sam Osborne
4	R10	Knockhill Racing Circuit	Ashley Sutton	Ashley Sutton	Ashley Sutton	Laser Tools Racing	Ashley Sutton	Carl Boardley
4	R11	Knockhill Racing Circuit		Ashley Sutton	Ashley Sutton	Laser Tools Racing	Ashley Sutton	Carl Boardley
4	R12	Knockhill Racing Circuit		Rory Butcher	Rory Butcher	Motorbase Performance	Rory Butcher	Michael Crees
5	R13	Thruxton Circuit	Dan Cammish	Tom Ingram	Tom Ingram	Toyota Gazoo Racing UK with Ginsters	Adam Morgan	Michael Crees
5	R14	Thruxton Circuit		Dan Cammish	Tom Ingram	Toyota Gazoo Racing UK with Ginsters	Ashley Sutton	Michael Crees
5	R15	Thruxton Circuit		Josh Cook	Josh Cook	BTC Racing	Josh Cook	Bobby Thompson
6	R16	Silverstone Circuit	Dan Cammish	Dan Cammish	Dan Cammish	Halfords Yuasa Racing	Rory Butcher	Carl Boardley
6	R17	Silverstone Circuit		Ashley Sutton	Colin Turkington	Team BMW	Adam Morgan	Sam Osborne
6	R18	Silverstone Circuit		Ashley Sutton	Ollie Jackson	Motorbase Performance	Ollie Jackson	Bobby Thompson
7	R19	Croft Circuit	Josh Cook	Josh Cook	Josh Cook	BTC Racing	Josh Cook	Bobby Thompson
7	R20	Croft Circuit		Rory Butcher	Josh Cook	BTC Racing	Josh Cook	Bobby Thompson
7	R21	Croft Circuit		Colin Turkington	Tom Ingram	Toyota Gazoo Racing UK with Ginsters	Tom Chilton	Sam Osborne
8	R22	Snetterton Circuit	Colin Turkington	Colin Turkington	Colin Turkington	Team BMW	Jake Hill	Michael Crees
8	R23	Snetterton Circuit		Colin Turkington	Colin Turkington	Team BMW	Ashley Sutton	Michael Crees
8	R24	Snetterton Circuit		Tom Ingram	Ollie Jackson	Motorbase Performance	Ollie Jackson	Michael Crees
9	R25	Brands Hatch Indy	Tom Ingram	Ashley Sutton	Dan Cammish	Halfords Yuasa Racing	Ashley Sutton	Paul Rivett
9	R26	Brands Hatch Indy		Ashley Sutton	Ashley Sutton	Laser Tools Racing	Ashley Sutton	Michael Crees
9	R27	Brands Hatch Indy		Dan Cammish	Rory Butcher	Motorbase Performance	Rory Butcher	Michael Crees

== Championship standings ==
Points system
**1st**	**2nd**	**3rd**	**4th**	**5th**	**6th**	**7th**	**8th**	**9th**	**10th**	**11th**	**12th**	**13th**	**14th**	**15th**	R1 PP	Fastest lap	Lead a lap
20	17	15	13	11	10	9	8	7	6	5	4	3	2	1	1	1	1

Notes

- No driver may collect more than one point for leading a lap per race regardless of how many laps they lead.

=== Drivers' Championship ===
Pos.	Driver	DON			BHGP			OUL			KNO			THR			SIL			CRO			SNE			BHI			Pts
1	Ashley Sutton	14	5	1*	6	3	2	8	1*	4	**1***	**1***	11	5	4	4	5	26	3	4	20	5	5	3	4	2	1*	6	350
2	Colin Turkington	**2***	1*	10	2	1*	5	4	3	2	2	2	9	NC	13	8	4	1*	10	3	Ret	NC	**1***	**1***	3	9	4	9	336
3	Dan Cammish	1*	**6**	7	1*	**19**	Ret	2	4	15	6	4	6	**2**	2	10	**1***	**2**	4	10	5	2	6	6	6	1*	**3**	4	334
4	Tom Ingram	4	4	6	4	2	Ret	6	5	Ret	4	3	10	1*	**1***	5	2	25*	Ret	13	4	1*	2	2	8	**3***	2	2	326
5	Rory Butcher	3	2	11	**Ret***	4	Ret	**1***	**2***	8	5	10	1*	6	5	3	3	14	Ret	5	19	11	4	4	5	4	10	1*	286
6	Tom Oliphant	6	3	9	8	7	1*	12	6	3	8	6	4	8	6	6	Ret	9	**2***	11	7	6	14	11	12	10	15	13	228
7	Jake Hill	Ret	Ret	NC	10	Ret	Ret	3	7	7	3	8	5	22	11	9	7	7	15	2	3	7	3	5	9	6	7	3	212
8	Adam Morgan	12	8	4	11	6	Ret	7	9	1*	12	14	14	4	Ret	Ret	6	3	5	9	13	13	7	9	2	11	6	5	206
9	Josh Cook	13	10	3	21	Ret	17	DSQ	21	11	Ret	Ret	15	9	8	**1***	10	6	7	**1***	**1***	8	8	7	7	8	9	7	196
10	Tom Chilton	10	13	12	5	Ret	8	5	8	5	11	7	3	7	7	2	15	11	9	6	6	**3**	16	16	17	12	18*	11	184
11	Matt Neal	5	7	8	Ret	Ret	6	NC	13	NC	7	15	12	3	3	7	8	4	11	7	2*	4	13	12	13	7	16	14	181
12	Ollie Jackson	17	11	5*	3	5	Ret	13	15	19	16	13	Ret	14	14	13	13	8	1*	14	Ret	12	21	8	1*	5	5	10	152
13	Senna Proctor	Ret	DNS	Ret	7	8	9	10	11	6	13	11	**2**	11	10	12	14	10	6	18	9	9	9	13	10	19	8	19	141
14	Chris Smiley	8	12	**2***	15	13	Ret	9	14	9	14	9	7	13	16	16	16	15	13	12	12	19	11	10	**23**	13	11	12	106
15	Aiden Moffat	15	20	17	18	12	**4**	17	16	10	9	5	8	15	18	NC	11	5	8	16	11	10	27	NC	11	14	12	**8**	105
16	Stephen Jelley	9	9	18	9	9	3	20	20	Ret	10	Ret	13	20	17	17	9	20	18	15	10	14	12	17	16	16	17	Ret	72
17	Michael Crees	16	14	13	12	Ret	11	11	12	Ret	17	17	16	10	9	21	Ret	Ret	Ret	22	Ret	Ret	10	14	14	20	13	15	50
18	Bobby Thompson	11	17	15	14	Ret	12	14	10	**18**	18	DSQ	19	17	Ret	15	18	13	12	8	8	Ret							44
19	Sam Osborne	7	Ret	Ret	24	16	10	16	17	12	19	18	Ret	NC	22	20	17	12	20	Ret	14	15	17	15	Ret	Ret	14	Ret	29
20	James Gornall	Ret	DNS	16	13	10	7	18	Ret	21	Ret	20	18	18	Ret	DNS	22	16	Ret										18
21	Carl Boardley	19	15	14	16	15	16	Ret	25	14	15	12	17	Ret	19	Ret	12	23	14	20	DNS	22	15	24	18	24	Ret	23	18
22	Rob Austin													12	12	11													13
23	Jack Goff	18	16	Ret	17	11	Ret	Ret	18	13	Ret	19	21	16	15	14	Ret	19	16	17	18	18	18	Ret	19	17	20	16	11
24	Ollie Brown	21	Ret	22	20	20	13	22	22	Ret																			3
25	Andy Neate	20	18	19	19	14	18	15	19	20	Ret	Ret	20	DSQ	DSQ	DSQ	21	22	Ret	21	16	16	26	22	Ret	18	21	Ret	3
26	Jack Butel	22	19	20	23	18	14	19	24	16	20	21	22	19	20	18	20	17	17	Ret	17	20	20	20	24	23	19	21	2
27	Mike Bushell							21	26	17	21	16	Ret							19	15	17							1
28	Paul Rivett																						19	23	21	15	23	17	1
29	Nicolas Hamilton	Ret	Ret	21	22	17	15	Ret	23	Ret				Ret	Ret	Ret	24	24	21	Ret	DNS	21	23	Ret	DNS	Ret	25	20	1
30	Glynn Geddie																						25	18	15	Ret	Ret	18	1
31	Tom Onslow-Cole													21	21	19	19	18	19										0
32	Ethan Hammerton																						24	19	22	22	24	24	0
33	Jessica Hawkins																						22	21	20				0
34	Bradley Philpot																									21	22	22	0
35	Jade Edwards																23	21	Ret										0
NC	Jac Constable																			WD	WD	WD							0
Pos.	Driver	DON			BHGP			OUL			KNO			THR			SIL			CRO			SNE			BHI			Pts

Colour	Result
Gold	Winner
Silver	2nd place
Bronze	3rd place
Green	Points finish
Blue	Non-points finish
Blue	Non-classified finish (NC)
Purple	Retired (Ret)
Red	Did not qualify (DNQ)
Red	Did not pre-qualify (DNPQ)
Black	Disqualified (DSQ)
White	Did not start (DNS)
White	Withdrew (WD)
White	Race cancelled (C)
Blank	Did not participate (DNP)
Blank	Excluded (EX)

**Bold** – Pole position

Italics – Fastest lap
* – Lead race lap

=== Manufacturers'/Constructors' Championship ===
Pos.	Manufacturer	Constructor	Points
1	BMW	West Surrey Racing	776
2	Honda	Team Dynamics	739
3	Toyota	Speedworks Motorsport	401

=== Teams' Championship ===
Pos.	Team	Points
1	Team BMW	550
2	Halfords Yuasa Racing	505
3	Laser Tools Racing	439
4	Motorbase Performance	426
5	BTC Racing	371
6	Toyota Gazoo Racing UK with Ginsters	316
7	Excelr8 Motorsport	246
8	Carlube TripleR Racing with Mac Tools	207
9	MB Motorsport accelerated by Blue Square	183***
10	Team Parker Racing	72
11	GKR TradePriceCars.com	63
12	The Clever Baggers with BTC Racing	40*
13	HUB Financial Solutions with Team HARD	19
14	RCIB Insurance with Fox Transport	16
15	Power Maxed Car Care Racing	13
16	ROKiT Racing with Team HARD	1

=== Independent Drivers' Championship ===
Pos.	Driver	Points
1	Ashley Sutton	415
2	Rory Butcher	348
3	Adam Morgan	298
4	Tom Chilton	287
5	Jake Hill	284
6	Josh Cook	249
7	Ollie Jackson	231
8	Senna Proctor	223
9	Chris Smiley	197
10	Aiden Moffat	191
11	Stephen Jelley	155
12	Michael Crees	122
13	Bobby Thompson	104
14	Sam Osborne	86
15	Carl Boardley	74
16	Jack Goff	74
17	James Gornall	46
18	Andy Neate	32
19	Jack Butel	32
20	Rob Austin	26
21	Mike Bushell	17
22	Paul Rivett	12
23	Glynn Geddie	12
24	Nicolas Hamilton	7
25	Ollie Brown	6
26	Tom Onslow-Cole	6
27	Ethan Hammerton	2
28	Jessica Hawkins	1
29	Bradley Philpot	0
30	Jade Edwards	0
NC	Jack Constable	0

=== Independent Teams' Championship ===
Pos.	Team	Points
1	Laser Tools Racing	447
2	Motorbase Performance	424
3	BTC Racing	368
4	Carlube TripleR Racing with Mac Tools	332
5	Excelr8 Motorsport	308
6	MB Motorsport accelerated by Blue Square	274***
7	Team Parker Racing	219
8	GKR TradePriceCars.com	200
9	RCIB Insurance with Fox Transport	184
10	The Clever Baggers with BTC Racing	157*
11	HUB Financial Solutions with Team HARD	144
12	Power Maxed Car Care Racing	99
13	ROKiT Racing with Team HARD	60

=== Jack Sears Trophy ===
Pos.	Driver	Points
1	Michael Crees	358
2	Carl Boardley	310
3	Jack Butel	300
4	Sam Osborne	295
5	Bobby Thompson	280
6	Andy Neate	228
7	James Gornall	156
8	Nicolas Hamilton	116
9	Mike Bushell	103
10	Paul Rivett	79
11	Ollie Brown	67
12	Ethan Hammerton	59
13	Glynn Geddie	54
14	Bradley Philpot	34
15	Jessica Hawkins	33
16	Jade Edwards	20
NC	Jack Constable	0
