= Mikey Doble =

British racing driver (born 1998)

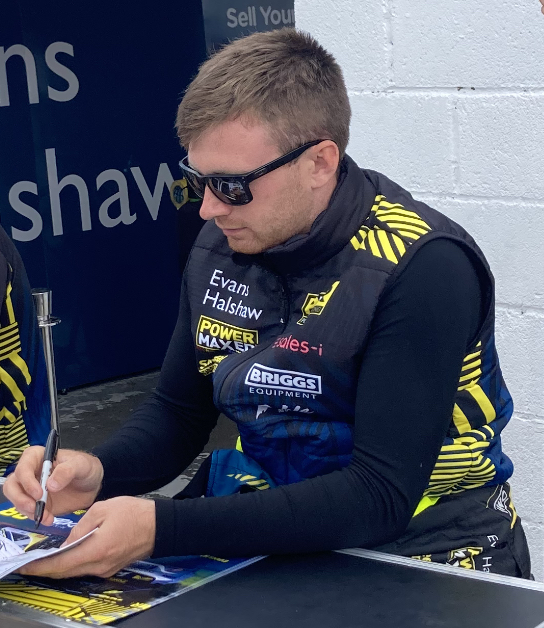
- Doble at Thruxton Circuit in 2024.
- Nationality: (United Kingdom) British
- Born: Michael John Rainey Doble; 8 December 1998 (age 27) Caterham, England

British Touring Car Championship career
- Debut season: 2023
- Current team: LKQ Euro Car Parts with Power Maxed Racing
- Car number: 88
- Starts: 118 (121 entries)
- Wins: 3
- Podiums: 6
- Poles: 2
- Fastest laps: 0
- Best finish: 12th in 2024

Previous series
- 2022, 2021 2018-2022: Ginetta GT5 Challenge; BMW Compact Cup

Championship titles
- 2026 2024 2022 2022: BTCC Independents' Trophy; Jack Sears Trophy; Ginetta GT5 Challenge; BMW Compact Cup

Michael John Rainey Doble (born 8 December 1998) is a British racing driver who is competing in the British Touring Car Championship for LKQ Euro Car Parts with Power Maxed Racing. He is champion of the 2022 Ginetta GT5 Challenge and the 2022 BMW Compact Cup, and he made his British Touring Car Championship debut in 2023.

== Career ==
=== Karting ===
Doble began his career in karting, and competed in various championships across the United Kingdom, such as the Super 1 National Super Cadet Championship in 2012, where he came fifth.

=== Golf ===
Following Doble's karting career, his focus moved to golf, which he played full time for five years with the ambition of becoming a professional golfer, winning titles at a county and collegiate level.

=== BMW Compact Cup ===
Doble returned to Racing and subsequently made his car racing debut in 2018, competing in the BRSCC BMW Compact Cup. He competed in this championship from 2018 to 2022, and won the championship title in 2022.

=== Ginetta GT5 Challenge ===
In 2021, Doble competed in the Ginetta GT5 Challenge with Xentek Motorsport. He finished fourth in the Pro standings this year, with two podiums throughout the season.

Doble returned to the championship with Xentek the following year in 2022, and won two races during the season. Doble was the provisional champion following the final race of the weekend, but was given a three-second post-race penalty for a yellow flag infringement, which demoted his race three position from second to fifth, making Will Jenkins the provisional champion. Following a hearing at the Motorsport UK National Court following the season, Doble was reinstated second place and his championship title was confirmed.

=== British Touring Car Championship ===
==== 2023 ====
On 7 March 2023, it was announced that Doble would compete in the 2023 British Touring Car Championship with CarStore Power Maxed Racing, alongside Árón Taylor-Smith and Andrew Watson. He would be eligible for the Jack Sears Trophy. During qualifying for the ninth race weekend at Silverstone Mikey became the only non Napa Racing driver to secure pole position.

==== 2024 ====
Doble was retained by Power Maxed Racing for the 2024 British Touring Car Championship, with the team running under the Evans Halshaw Power Maxed Racing banner and reverting to a two-car line-up alongside Árón Taylor-Smith.

The season proved a breakthrough campaign for Doble. He embarked on a 19-round Jack Sears Trophy podium streak from the season opener at Donington Park, and at Oulton Park took all three Jack Sears Trophy class wins on the same weekend. In the final race of that meeting Doble led much of the running before being passed on the closing lap, finishing second overall and missing out on a maiden outright BTCC victory by 0.749 seconds to eventual Drivers' Champion Jake Hill.

Doble was confirmed as the Jack Sears Trophy champion at the end of the season, having won approximately half of the season's class races. He finished twelfth in the overall Drivers' Championship with 148 points, his career-best result at the time.

==== 2025 ====
Doble continued with Power Maxed Racing for a third successive season in the 2025 British Touring Car Championship, with the team running under the Motor Parts Direct with Power Maxed Racing banner.

On 25 May 2025, Doble took his maiden BTCC race victory in the third race at Snetterton, holding off four-time champion Ashley Sutton from reverse-grid pole position. The win was Power Maxed Racing's first BTCC race victory since 2019.

A fire at Power Maxed Racing's headquarters mid-season destroyed the team's racecars and equipment, forcing Doble and his teammates to switch from the Vauxhall Astra to a loaned Cupra Leon for the final four rounds of the season, beginning at Knockhill.

Doble finished runner-up in the Independent Drivers' Championship, losing the title to Daniel Lloyd of Restart Racing by four points after taking the title fight to the final race at Brands Hatch. He ended the season eighteenth in the overall Drivers' Championship with 100 points.

==== 2026 ====
Doble driving for Power Maxed Racing at the Silverstone Circuit in 2026

For the 2026 British Touring Car Championship, Doble remained with Power Maxed Racing for a fourth consecutive season, racing under the LKQ Euro Car Parts with Power Maxed Racing banner alongside Aiden Moffat in the team's all-new Audi S3 Saloon. Dexter Patterson joined the squad in a third Audi running under the Steel Seal with Power Maxed Racing entry.

At the season opener at Donington Park on 18-19 April 2026, Doble took the Independents' class victory in the championship's inaugural Qualifying Race, finishing fourth overall. In Race One, Doble inherited his second BTCC race victory after on-track winner Tom Ingram was disqualified for an overboost infringement.

== Personal life ==
Doble's father, Mike, is a former racing driver who raced alongside him in the BMW Compact Cup. His grandfather, Mick, is also a former racing driver. The Doble family runs Doble Motorcycles, a long-established Honda dealership based in Coulsdon, Surrey, founded in 1967 by Mike Doble Sr. and Mike's brother, Chris Doble.

His younger brother, Isaac Doble, is also a racing driver. Isaac contested the BRSCC Fiesta Junior Championship in 2025 as a rookie, taking four race wins and entering the final round as championship leader, before stepping up to the Mairon Motorsport MINI CHALLENGE Trophy for the 2026 season.

== Racing record ==
=== Racing career summary ===
Season	Series	Team	Races	Wins	Poles	F/Laps	Podiums	Points	Position
2018	BMW Compact Cup		13	?	?	?	?	315	20th
2019	BMW Compact Cup		?	?	?	?	?	521	5th
2020	BMW Compact Cup		8	0	0	0	0	337	6th
2021	Ginetta GT5 Challenge - Pro	Xentek Motorsport	18	0	1	0	2	315	4th
2021	BMW Compact Cup		14	2	0	1	9	507	**2nd**
2022	Ginetta GT5 Challenge - Pro	Xentek Motorsport	18	2	2	1	9	430	**1st**
2022	BMW Compact Cup		16	10	?	5	13	699	**1st**
2023	British Touring Car Championship	CarStore Power Maxed Racing	30	0	1	0	0	63	20th
2024	British Touring Car Championship	Evans Halshaw Power Maxed Racing	28	0	0	0	1	148	12th
2025	British Touring Car Championship	Motor Parts Direct with Power Maxed Racing	30	1	0	0	1	100	18th
2026	British Touring Car Championship	LKQ Euro Car Parts with Power Maxed Racing	30	2	1	0	4	276	6th

=== Complete British Touring Car Championship results ===
(key) Races in bold indicate pole position (1 point awarded – 2002–2003 all races, 2004–present just in first race) Races in italics indicate fastest lap (1 point awarded all races) * signifies that driver lead race for at least one lap (1 point awarded – 2002 just in feature races, 2003–present all races; ^{Superscript} number indicates points-scoring qualifying race position)

Year	Team	Car	1	2	3	4	5	6	7	8	9	10	11	12	13	14	15	16	17	18	19	20	21	22	23	24	25	26	27	28	29	30	DC	Points
2023	CarStore Power Maxed Racing	Vauxhall Astra	DON; 1; 20	DON; 2; 5	DON; 3 Ret	BRH; 1; 19	BRH; 2; 18	BRH; 3; 16	SNE; 1; 17	SNE; 2; 19	SNE; 3; 15	THR; 1; 8	THR; 2; 14	THR; 3; 14	OUL; 1; 13	OUL; 2; 13	OUL; 3; 22	CRO; 1; 14	CRO; 2; 16	CRO; 3; 12	KNO; 1; 9	KNO; 2; 12	KNO; 3; 11	DON; 1; 16	DON; 2; 17	DON; 3; 16	**SIL**; **1**; 11	SIL; 2; 15	SIL; 3; 14	BRH; 1 Ret	BRH; 2; 16	BRH; 3; 14	20th	63
2024	Evans Halshaw Power Maxed Racing	Vauxhall Astra	DON; 1; 12	DON; 2; 13	DON; 3; 13	BRH; 1; 13	BRH; 2; 9	BRH; 3; 15	SNE; 1; 13	SNE; 2; 4	SNE; 3; 10	THR; 1; 11	THR; 2; 14	THR; 3; 11	OUL; 1; 11	OUL; 2; 6	**OUL**; **3**; 2*	CRO; 1; 11	CRO; 2; 11	CRO; 3; 15	KNO; 1; 10	KNO; 2; 18	KNO; 3 DNS	DON; 1; 15	DON; 2; 9	DON; 3; 6	SIL; 1 DNS	SIL; 2; 14	SIL; 3; 11	BRH; 1; 4	BRH; 2 NC	BRH; 3; 11	12th	148
2025	Motor Parts Direct with Power Maxed Racing	Vauxhall Astra	DON; 1; 5	DON; 2; 16	DON; 3; 7	BRH; 1; 6	BRH; 2; 22	BRH; 3; 20	SNE; 1; 9	SNE; 2; 6	**SNE**; **3**; 1*	THR; 1 Ret	THR; 2 Ret	THR; 3; 13	OUL; 1; 17	OUL; 2; 11	OUL; 3 Ret	CRO; 1; 15	CRO; 2; 14	CRO; 3; 10													18th	100
2025	Motor Parts Direct with Power Maxed Racing	Cupra León																			KNO; 1; 17	KNO; 2; 18	KNO; 3; 15	DON; 1; 17	DON; 2; 14	DON; 3; 17	SIL; 1; 21	SIL; 2; 11	SIL; 3; 10	BRH; 1; 14	BRH; 2; 14	BRH; 3; 14	18th	100
2026	LKQ Euro Car Parts with Power Maxed Racing	Audi S3 Saloon	DON; 1; 1^{4}	**DON**; **2**; 14	DON; 3; 19	BRH; 1; 7^{7}	BRH; 2; 6	BRH; 3; 3	SNE; 1; 14^{14}	SNE; 2; 13	SNE; 3; 11	OUL; 1; 6^{6}	OUL; 2; 5	OUL; 3; 11	THR; 1; 8^{9}	THR; 2; 8	THR; 3; 10	KNO; 1; 8^{7}	KNO; 2; 4	KNO; 3; 11	DON; 1; 10^{14}	DON; 2; 19	DON; 3; 11	CRO; 1; 9	CRO; 2; 10	**CRO**; **3**; 1*	**SIL**; **1**; 2*^{1}	SIL; 2; 16	SIL; 3; 17	BRH; 1; 6^{4}	BRH; 2; 4	BRH; 3; 10	6th	276

Sporting positions
Preceded by Andrew Watson	Jack Sears Trophy; Winner; 2024	Succeeded by Daryl DeLeon
Preceded by Daniel Lloyd	British Touring Car Championship; Independents' Trophy Winner; 2026	Succeeded by Incumbent
