= Max Power (magazine) =

Motoring magazine

- Frequency: Monthly
- First issue: May 1993
- Final issue: January 2011
- Company: Bauer
- Country: United Kingdom
- Based in: Peterborough

Max Power was a British magazine, based in Peterborough, focusing on the performance-tuning and car market.

== History ==
Launched in 1993 by EMAP, it was also published under licence in Greece, Denmark, Norway, South Africa, and in France under the name ADDX. After EMAP acquired Petersen in 2000, a United States edition was published based on its existing title MaxSpeed and featuring cars from America and the UK. This ceased publication in 2001 when EMAP sold its U.S. arm to Primedia (now Rent Group), but is still in print as Euro Tuner.

Former staff members include Fifth Gear presenters Jonny Smith and Vicki Butler-Henderson, who was one of the original staff in 1993.

== Criticism ==
Max Power was criticised for its promotion of unauthorised cruise events. The magazine had a rating system that scored the events in several areas including the size of the police presence, the behaviour and attractiveness of the girls, the number of "burnouts" performed and the general level of 'Barry' surrounding the event.

The magazine also occasionally campaigned against speed cameras and elderly drivers, and despite disclaimers was often criticised for printing articles about dangerous driving on public roads, including drifting and exceeding 200 mph on the A1. Another criticism was related to the large number of half-naked women in the publication, often described as "bottom-shelf porn". Glamour models who appeared in Max Power included Katie Price, Jakki Degg, Lauren Pope, Lucy Pinder, Michelle Marsh, Amy Green and Chantelle Houghton. The 2007 relaunch was aimed at reversing this criticism, but glamour shoots were later reintroduced.

The perceived laddishness of the magazine meant it was also seen as non-serious by car enthusiasts who wished to focus on the engine/handling modification side of car tuning. However, Max Power was for a long time the biggest-selling motoring magazine in Europe, and was therefore courted by motor manufacturers and auto industry PR teams, who provided them with test cars, exposure to new products, and opportunities for the magazine to cover their brands.

== Other ventures ==
Max Power started the Max Driver advanced driving scheme in 2006 in conjunction with the Institute of Advanced Motorists, Adrian Flux Insurance Services, Honda and Ripspeed. It was designed to provide young, inexperienced drivers professional tuition in handling their cars responsibly.

The title also had its own annual modified car show, Max Power Live in the Birmingham NEC. Attendance figures peaked at over 50,000, but it was cancelled from 2007.

In the UK, Infogrames PS1 title C3 Racing was named Max Power Racing and branded to match the magazine.

In the 2005 election, staff member Dan Anslow stood for the Southend West constituency for the Max Power Party.

== Closure ==
In November 2010, Bauer announced it was suspending the magazine and website. Its circulation had fallen from 237,894, to 20,589, according to the Audit Bureau of Circulations, amid difficult market conditions, including an audience which was increasingly moving online, decreased consumer spending during the 2009 recession and budget cutting.

The final monthly magazine was released in January 2011, but Bauer said it "intends to keep the Max Power brand alive in the future with a series of "one shots and special issues". The magazine brought out a special edition of the magazine to mark its production from 1993–2011.
