= Herbert Taylor =

Herbert Taylor may refer to:

- Herbert Taylor (British Army officer) (1775–1839), British general and politician
- Herbert Taylor (Australian politician) (1885–1970), Australian political party organiser
- Herb Taylor (American football) (born 1984), football player
- Herbert J. Taylor (1893–1978), American Rotarian
- Herbie Taylor (1889–1973), South African cricketer
- Herbert Taylor (English cricketer) (1910–93)
- Herbert Taylor (speed skater) (1906–1981), American Olympic speed skater
- Herbert Taylor (swimmer) (1892–1965), American swimmer and water polo player
- Herbert Hudson Taylor (1861–1950), British Protestant Christian missionary to China
- Herbert W. Taylor (1869–1931), American Republican Party politician
- J. Herbert Taylor, American molecular biologist and geneticist

== See also ==
- Bert Taylor (disambiguation)
