= Power Maxed Racing =

British motor racing team

(United Kingdom) Power Maxed Racing
- Founded: 2015
- Team principal(s): Adam Weaver
- Current series: BTCC
- Current drivers: 16. (United Kingdom) Aiden Moffat; 17. (United Kingdom) Dexter Patterson; 55. (United Kingdom) Nick Halstead; 88. (United Kingdom) Mikey Doble
- Website: http://www.powermaxedracing.com/

Power Maxed Racing (for sponsorship reasons competing under the LKQ Euro Car Parts with Power Maxed Racing and Steel Seal with Power Maxed Racing monikers) is a British auto racing team based in Studley, Warwickshire. The team has raced in the British Touring Car Championship, since 2015 after purchasing BTC Racing in February 2015.

== British Touring Car Championship ==
=== Chevrolet Cruze (2015–2016) ===
After having purchased BTC Racing in February 2015, the team will enter the 2015 British Touring Car Championship season with Dave Newsham and Josh Cook driving an NGTC Chevrolet Cruze each. The last season with the Chevrolet Cruze saw Emmerdale star Kelvin Fletcher take the wheel. Fletcher did not have a very successful season and was dropped from the team.

=== Vauxhall Astra (2017–2025) ===
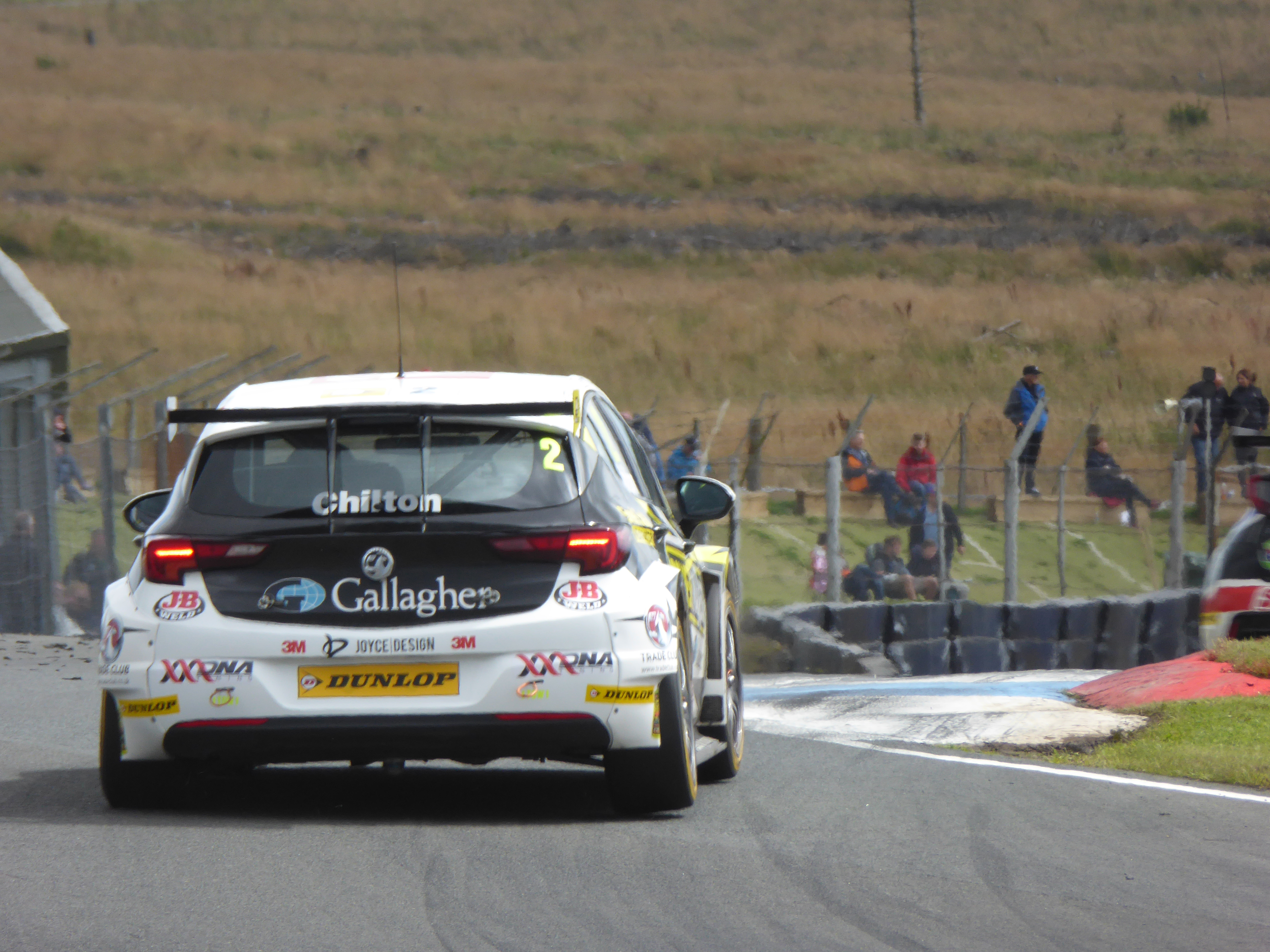
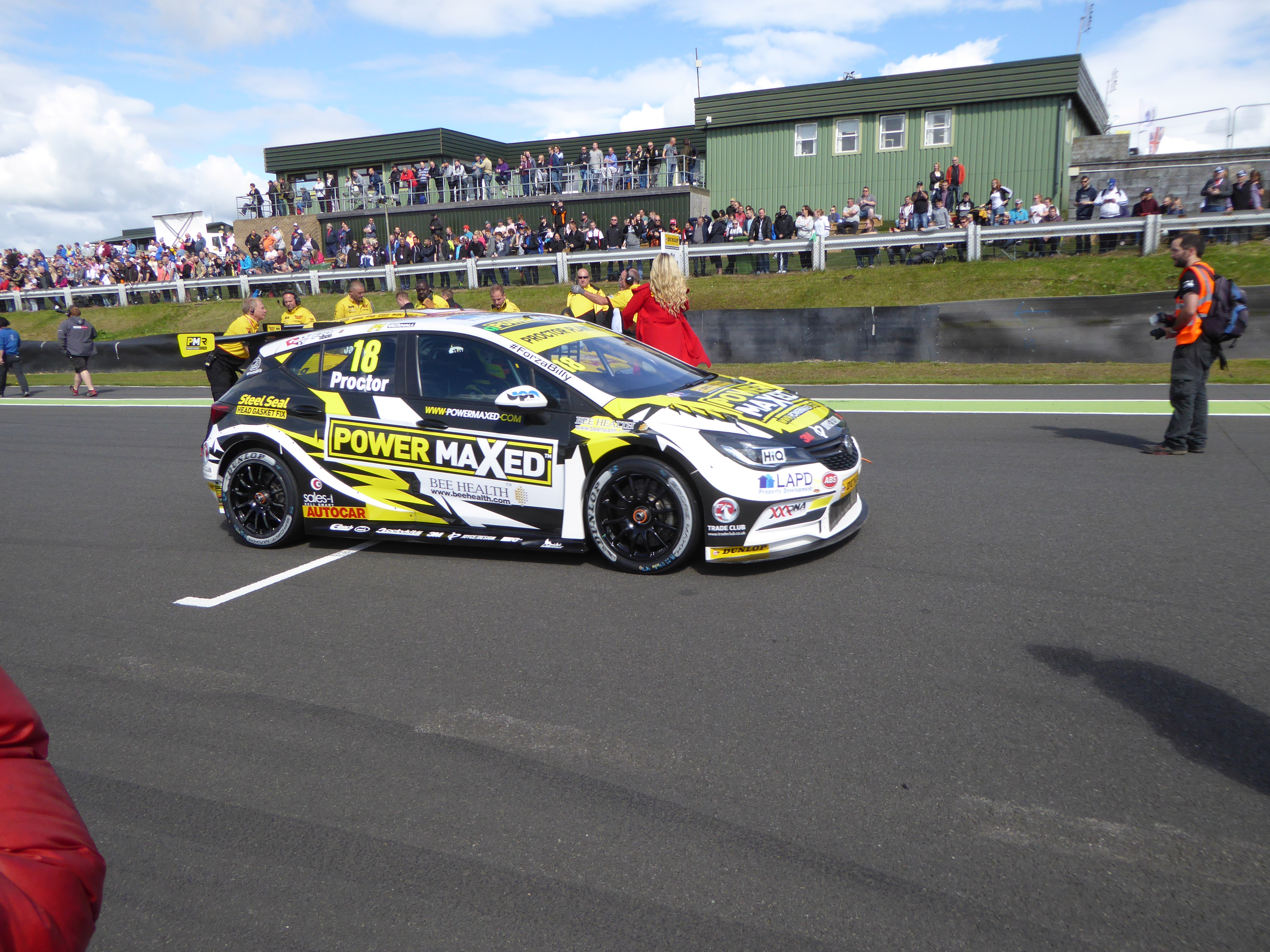
Tom Chilton (left) and Senna Proctor (right), the team's drivers, at the Knockhill round of the 2017 British Touring Car Championship.

On 22 November 2016 Power Maxed Racing announced that Vauxhall would be returning to BTCC with the Astra for the 2017 season.

The 2017 drivers were Tom Chilton and Senna Proctor. Senna secured victory in the prestigious Jack Sears Trophy, awarded to best rookie, with an unprecedented 5 rounds of the season left to run. The car earned a number of podiums under Tom Chilton and guest driver, WTCC Champion Rob Huff.

2018 saw 2015 Jack Sears Champion Josh Cook return to PMR alongside Proctor. Proctor would take both his and the team's first win in the second race at Brands Hatch, after gambling with slick tyres on a drying track. This was followed up by Cook taking the team's first pole position three weeks later at Donington Park, before converting it into his first win in race 1. Cook would go on to take another win in Race 2 at Thruxton, while Proctor would take 2 more podiums throughout the rest of the season. Cook finished the season in 6th with 246 points, with Proctor in 12th with 170 points to round out the team's best year in the sport.

For 2019, they signed Jason Plato and Rob Collard and ran under the name Sterling Insurance with Power Maxed Racing. Plato would win 2 races whilst Collard only achieved a best result of 2nd.

For 2020, Power Maxed Car Care Racing planned to enter Jason Plato once more and Mat Jackson as a manufacturer team. However, due to the Covid-19 pandemic, the team withdrew from the season, forcing Plato and Jackson to miss the year. The team would later enter from Round 3 as an independent and hire drivers on a one-off basis. Mike Bushell was the first, racing rounds 3 and 4 at Oulton Park and Knockhill. The next drivers would be Rob Austin, the only entry to score points, and Jade Edwards. Jac Constable was entered for Croft but withdrew and the car was empty. The final 2 entries of the year would be Jessica Hawkins and driver coach Bradley Philpot.

Jason Plato would return for 2021 for, once again newly named, Adrian Flux Power Maxed Racing. He would be partnered by Yorkshireman Daniel Lloyd. Surprisingly to some, Lloyd got the better of the champion Plato, The team would go winless for the second consecutive year.

For 2022, both Plato and Lloyd would leave the team. CarStore Power Maxed Racing signed Porsche Supercup driver Michael Crees, along with debutant and GT driver Ash Hand. Hand and Crees would be closely matched all season, but debutant Ash Hand would beat Crees by 5 points. The team would once again be winless and Hand would finish 3rd in the Jack Sears Trophy.

Crees and Hand would be dropped for 2023, the team instead bringing in a record 3 drivers. Árón Taylor-Smith would be the experienced head of the line-up, moving over from the Cupra León. The team would sign 2 rookies alongside ATS, being Mikey Doble and Andrew Watson. Despite once again ending the year without a win, Taylor-Smith and Watson mustered 2 podiums each, whilst Doble failed to score a podium. Rookies Watson and Doble fought for the Jack Sears Trophy, with Mikey Doble retiring from Race 1 at Brands Hatch, handing Andrew Watson the trophy.

Andrew Watson would be dropped for 2024 as the team decided to run only 2 cars, he instead moved to Toyota Gazoo Racing UK. Árón Taylor-Smith would once again score 2 podiums, whilst Doble scored 1. No wins appeared for Evans Halshaw Power Maxed Racing for the 5th straight year. Mikey Doble would win Jack Sears Trophy by 53 points over Sam Osborne.

Motor Parts Direct with Power Maxed Racing would see Árón Taylor-Smith leave for 2025, following Watson in joining Toyota Gazoo Racing UK. This reduced the team to a one-car line-up. Nick Halstead would later join the team for Brands Hatch Indy alongside Doble. For the first time since 2019, the team would win a race, with Mikey Doble fending off fellow independents Daniel Lloyd and Chris Smiley to win the reverse grid Race 3 at Snetterton. The team would score double points at Round 6 at Croft, with Doble finishing 10th and Halstead 14th.

=== Cupra León (2025) ===
On the 10th of August 2025, Power Maxed Racing's headquarters were destroyed in a fire as a result of a neighbouring company burning pallets, which got out of control, resulting in the total loss of their entire fleet of cars including their iconic Touring Car Vauxhall Astras. They would enter the Round 7 at Knockhill on the same week with two Cupra Leóns, one loaned to them by Un-Limited Motorsport, previously driven by Stephen Jelley at Croft, and the other previously raced by Scott Sumpton in 2024 and owned by the Patterson family.

=== Audi S3 Saloon (2026) ===
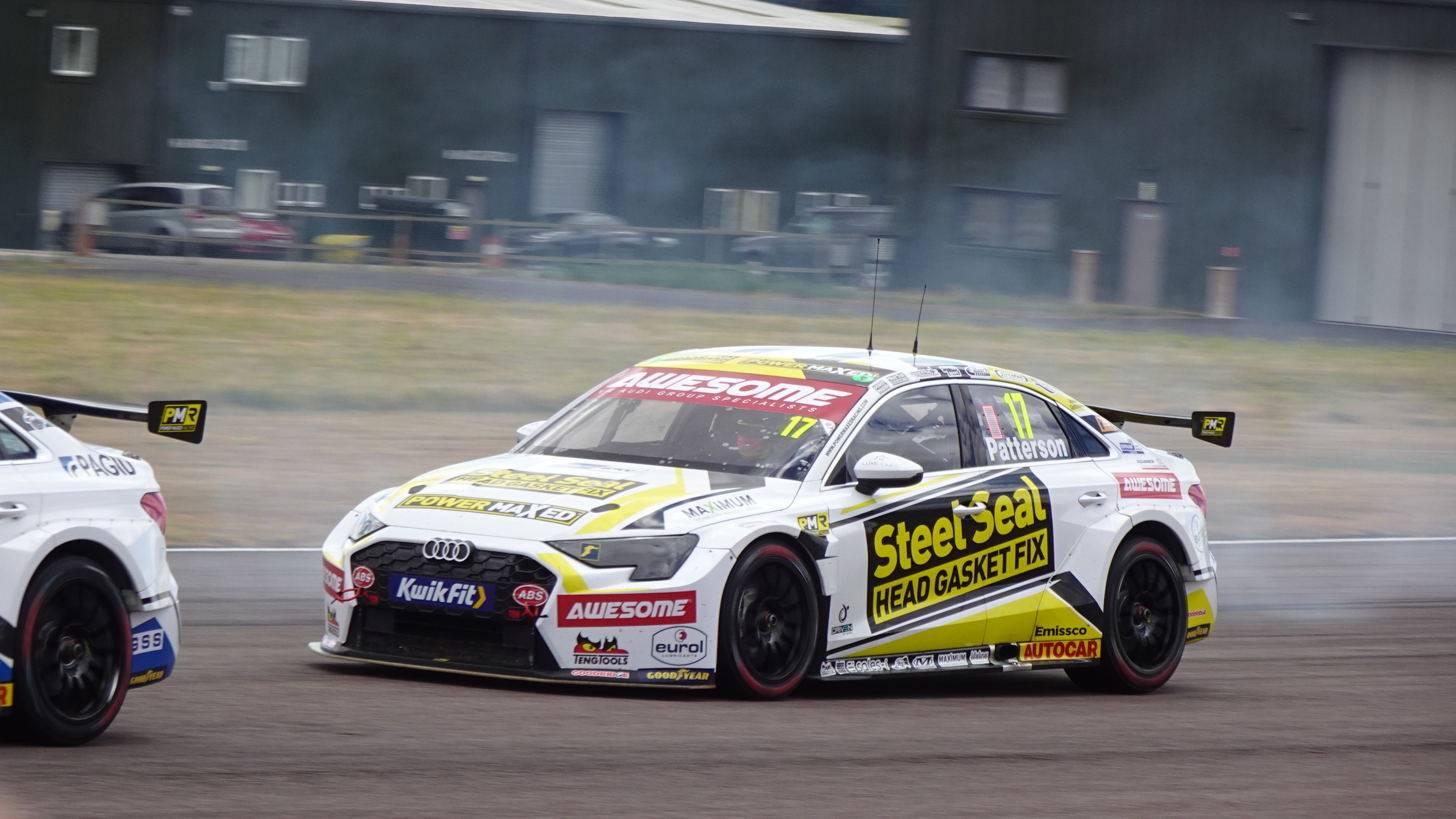
Patterson driving for Power Maxed at Thruxton Circuit in 2026

For 2026, Power Maxed Racing took the risky decision to drop the Cupra León after 4 rounds and start from scratch, bringing the Audi S3 Saloon back to the BTCC. They also moved headquarters to Studley around 15 minutes away. They formed an alliance with car part giant LKQ Euro Car Parts, forming LKQ Euro Car Parts with Power Maxed Racing. They sponsored cars of new driver Aiden Moffat and returning driver Mikey Doble. Long time business and family friend Dexter Patterson joined and raced in the standard Steel Seal with Power Maxed Racing livery. Doble won Round 1 of 2026 in after Ingram was disqualified, scoring the car's first win since 2019 and scored his second career win, Moffat and Patterson both showed great promise with 3 sets of Top 10 finishes. Former driver Nick Halstead unretired to run a record 4th car for the team, partnering Patterson under the Steel Seal guise.

== Racing results ==
=== British Touring Car Championship ===
Year	Name	Car	No.	Driver	Races	Wins	Poles	F/Laps	Podiums	Points	DC	CC Pts	CC
2015	Power Maxed Racing	Chevrolet Cruze 4dr	17	(United Kingdom) Dave Newsham	29	0	0	0	0	95	16th	209	8th
2015	Power Maxed Racing	Chevrolet Cruze 4dr	66	(United Kingdom) Josh Cook	30	0	0	0	1	95	15th	209	8th
2016	Power Maxed Racing	Chevrolet Cruze	54	(United Kingdom) Hunter Abbott	30	0	0	1	0	38	19th	68	14th
2016	Power Maxed Racing	Chevrolet Cruze	71	(United Kingdom) Dave Newsham	6	0	0	0	0	28	22nd	68	14th
2016	Power Maxed Racing	Chevrolet Cruze	84	(United Kingdom) Kelvin Fletcher	24	0	0	0	0	0	32nd	68	14th
2017	Power Maxed Racing	Vauxhall Astra	2	(United Kingdom) Tom Chilton	27	0	0	1	1	100	15th	201	7th
2017	Power Maxed Racing	Vauxhall Astra	18	(United Kingdom) Senna Proctor	30	0	0	1	0	63	19th	201	7th
2017	Power Maxed Racing	Vauxhall Astra	37	(United Kingdom) Rob Huff	3	0	0	0	1	26	25th	201	7th
2018	Power Maxed TAG Racing	Vauxhall Astra	18	(United Kingdom) Senna Proctor	30	1	0	1	3	170	12th	409	3rd
2018	Power Maxed TAG Racing	Vauxhall Astra	66	(United Kingdom) Josh Cook	30	2	0	4	6	246	6th	409	3rd
2019	Sterling Insurance with Power Maxed Racing	Vauxhall Astra	9	(United Kingdom) Rob Collard	30	0	0	1	2	118	16th	348	5th
2019	Sterling Insurance with Power Maxed Racing	Vauxhall Astra	11	(United Kingdom) Jason Plato	30	1	1	1	3	237	7th	348	5th
2020	Power Maxed Car Care Racing	Vauxhall Astra	9	(United Kingdom) Jade Edwards	3	0	0	0	0	0	35th	13	15th
2020	Power Maxed Car Care Racing	Vauxhall Astra	10	(United Kingdom) Rob Austin	3	0	0	0	0	13	22nd	13	15th
2020	Power Maxed Car Care Racing	Vauxhall Astra	21	(United Kingdom) Mike Bushell	3 (Note: Bushell competed round 7 with Team HARD.)	0	0	0	0	1 (Note: Bushell scored all his points with Team HARD.)	27th	13	15th
2020	Power Maxed Car Care Racing	Vauxhall Astra	29	(United Kingdom) Jac Constable	0	0	0	0	0	0	NC	13	15th
2020	Power Maxed Car Care Racing	Vauxhall Astra	39	(United Kingdom) Jessica Hawkins	3	0	0	0	0	0	33rd	13	15th
2020	Power Maxed Car Care Racing	Vauxhall Astra	49	(United Kingdom) Bradley Philpot	3	0	0	0	0	0	34th	13	15th
2021	Adrian Flux with Power Maxed Racing	Vauxhall Astra	11	(United Kingdom) Jason Plato	30	0	0	0	1	156	14th	362	7th
2021	Adrian Flux with Power Maxed Racing	Vauxhall Astra	123	(United Kingdom) Daniel Lloyd	30	0	0	0	4	190	11th	362	7th
2022	CarStore Power Maxed Racing	Vauxhall Astra	97	(United Kingdom) Ash Hand	30	0	0	0	0	55	19th	53	11th
2022	CarStore Power Maxed Racing	Vauxhall Astra	777	(United Kingdom) Michael Crees	29	0	0	0	0	50	20th	53	11th
2023	CarStore Power Maxed Racing	Vauxhall Astra	11	(United Kingdom) Andrew Watson	30	0	0	0	2	93	15th	342	7th
2023	CarStore Power Maxed Racing	Vauxhall Astra	40	(Republic of Ireland) Árón Taylor-Smith	29	0	0	1	2	165	11th	342	7th
2023	CarStore Power Maxed Racing	Vauxhall Astra	88	(United Kingdom) Mikey Doble	30	0	1	0	0	63	20th	342	7th
2024	Evans Halshaw with Power Maxed Racing	Vauxhall Astra	40	(Republic of Ireland) Árón Taylor-Smith	30	0	0	1	2	224	7th	427	5th
2024	Evans Halshaw with Power Maxed Racing	Vauxhall Astra	88	(United Kingdom) Mikey Doble	29	0	0	0	1	148	12th	427	5th
2025	Motor Parts Direct with Power Maxed Racing	Vauxhall Astra	50	(United Kingdom) Nick Halstead	23	0	0	0	0	4	27th	190	8th
2025	Motor Parts Direct with Power Maxed Racing	Cupra León	50	(United Kingdom) Nick Halstead	23	0	0	0	0	4	27th	190	8th
2025	Motor Parts Direct with Power Maxed Racing	Cupra León	88	(United Kingdom) Mikey Doble	30	1	0	0	1	100	8th	190	8th
2025	Motor Parts Direct with Power Maxed Racing	Vauxhall Astra	88	(United Kingdom) Mikey Doble	30	1	0	0	1	100	8th	190	8th
2026	LKQ Euro Car Parts with Power Maxed Racing	Audi S3 Saloon	16	(United Kingdom) Aiden Moffat									
2026	LKQ Euro Car Parts with Power Maxed Racing	Audi S3 Saloon	88	(United Kingdom) Mikey Doble									
2026	Steel Seal with Power Maxed Racing	Audi S3 Saloon	17	(United Kingdom) Dexter Patterson									
2026	Steel Seal with Power Maxed Racing	Audi S3 Saloon	55	(United Kingdom) Nick Halstead									

== Other Touring Car Ventures ==
=== Touring Car Trophy (2019) ===
Power Maxed Racing entered a BTCC-spec Vauxhall Astra in the finale of the 2019 Touring Car Trophy for series organiser Stewart Lines.

=== TCR UK (2020) ===
Power Maxed Racing has announced it will make the move into TCR UK for the 2020 season full-time in partnership with TradePriceCars.com. The team will run a Cupra León TCR in the series, with Trade Price Cars owner Dan Kirby the driver.

== Engineering ==
Power Maxed Racing are renowned for their skills in project management. From initial design, through development, to finished product, the company has built a number of successful racing cars being campaigned across Europe.
