= Jade Edwards =

British racing driver (born 1990)

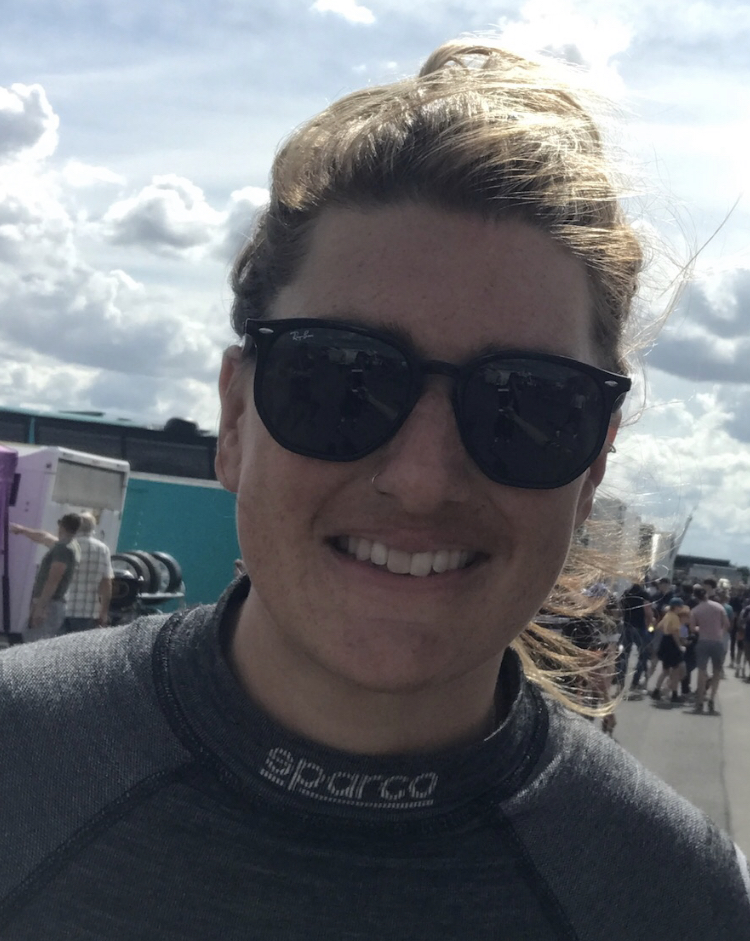
- Edwards at Thruxton Circuit in 2022
- Nationality: (United Kingdom) British
- Born: 31 March 1990 (age 36) Ascot, Berkshire, England
- Relatives: Jim Edwards Jr. (father)

British Touring Car Championship career
- Debut season: 2020
- Car number: 99
- Former teams: Power Maxed Racing; Team HARD.
- Starts: 91 (93 entries)
- Wins: 0
- Poles: 0
- Fastest laps: 0
- Best finish: 26th in 2021 & 2022

Previous series
- 2017-19 2015 2006: Renault Clio Cup UK; British GT Championship; Ginetta Junior Championship

Jade Edwards (born 31 March 1990 in Ascot) is a British racing driver and television presenter currently co presenting ITV4's live coverage of the British Touring Car Championship. Edwards is known for previously competing in the British Touring Car Championship, driving for One Motorsport. Edwards has previously competed in the Renault Clio Cup UK, British GT Championship and the Ginetta Junior Championship, and made her BTCC debut in 2020. She is the daughter of 2000 Renault Clio Cup UK champion Jim Edwards Jr. and granddaughter of Jim Edwards Sr. Edwards is the first third generation BTCC driver.

== Racing record ==
=== Racing career summary ===
Season	Series	Team	Races	Wins	Poles	F/Laps	Podiums	Points	Position
2006	Ginetta Junior Championship	Jade Edwards	12	0	0	0	0	119	9th
2014	British GT Championship - GT4	Optimum Motorsport	3	0	0	0	0	3	16th
2014	Aston Martin GT4 Challenge	Craft-Bamboo Racing	4	1	0	0	2	?	?
2015	British GT Championship - GT4	Stratton Motorsport	5	0	0	0	0	2.5	25th
2015	24H Series - SP2	MARC Cars Australia	1	0	0	0	0	?	?
2016	Celtic Speed Scottish Mini Cooper Cup	?	?	?	?	?	?	?	?
2017	Renault UK Clio Cup	Ciceley Motorsport	17	0	0	0	0	75	16th
2018	Renault UK Clio Cup	M.R.M.	18	0	0	0	0	54	14th
2019	Renault UK Clio Cup	Team HARD	12	0	0	0	0	181	7th
2019	Renault UK Clio Cup	MRM Racing	4	0	0	0	0	181	7th
2020	British Touring Car Championship	Power Maxed Car Care Racing	3	0	0	0	0	0	35th
2021	British Touring Car Championship	PHSC with BTC Racing	30	0	0	0	0	1	26th
2022	British Touring Car Championship	Rich Energy BTC Racing	30	0	0	0	0	1	26th
2023	British Touring Car Championship	Re.Beverages and Bartercard with Team HARD.	13	0	0	0	0	−5	31st
2023	British Touring Car Championship	One Motorsport with Starline Racing	15	0	0	0	0	−5	31st
2023	Britcar Trophy Championship - Class T1	Assetto Motorsport	3	0	0	0	0	36	28th‡

^{*}Season still in progress. ‡ Team standings.

=== Complete British Touring Car Championship results ===
(key) (Races in bold indicate pole position – 1 point awarded just in first race; races in italics indicate fastest lap – 1 point awarded all races; * signifies that driver led race for at least one lap – 1 point given all races)

Year	Team	Car	1	2	3	4	5	6	7	8	9	10	11	12	13	14	15	16	17	18	19	20	21	22	23	24	25	26	27	28	29	30	DC	Points
2020	Power Maxed Car Care Racing	Vauxhall Astra	DON; 1	DON; 2	DON; 3	BRH; 1	BRH; 2	BRH; 3	OUL; 1	OUL; 2	OUL; 3	KNO; 1	KNO; 2	KNO; 3	THR; 1	THR; 2	THR; 3	SIL; 1; 23	SIL; 2; 21	SIL; 3 Ret	CRO; 1	CRO; 2	CRO; 3	SNE; 1	SNE; 2	SNE; 3	BRH; 1	BRH; 2	BRH; 3				35th	0
2021	PHSC with BTC Racing	Honda Civic Type R	THR; 1; 20	THR; 2 Ret	THR; 3 Ret	SNE; 1; 25	SNE; 2; 23	SNE; 3; 15	BRH; 1; 22	BRH; 2; 22	BRH; 3; 27	OUL; 1; 21	OUL; 2; 20	OUL; 3; 20	KNO; 1; 26	KNO; 2; 23	KNO; 3; 19	THR; 1; 21	THR; 2; 24	THR; 3 Ret	CRO; 1; 27	CRO; 2; 21	CRO; 3 Ret	SIL; 1; 22	SIL; 2 Ret	SIL; 3; 24	DON; 1; 25	DON; 2; 21	DON; 3; 26	BRH; 1; 26	BRH; 2; 16	BRH; 3; 20	26th	1
2022	Rich Energy BTC Racing	Honda Civic Type R	DON; 1; 22	DON; 2; 19	DON; 3; 22	BRH; 1; 18	BRH; 2; 15	BRH; 3; 17	THR; 1 Ret	THR; 2; 21	THR; 3 Ret	OUL; 1; 21	OUL; 2; 19	OUL; 3; 18	CRO; 1; 22	CRO; 2; 23	CRO; 3 NC	KNO; 1; 22	KNO; 2; 20	KNO; 3; 24	SNE; 1 Ret	SNE; 2; 22	SNE; 3; 23	THR; 1; 25	THR; 2; 23	THR; 3; 21	SIL; 1; 17	SIL; 2; 24	SIL; 3; 23	BRH; 1; 22	BRH; 2; 25	BRH; 3; 21	26th	1
2023	Re.Beverages and Bartercard with Team HARD.	Cupra León	DON; 1 DNS	DON; 2 NC	DON; 3 Ret	BRH; 1; 20	BRH; 2; 22	BRH; 3 Ret	SNE; 1; 25	SNE; 2; 26	SNE; 3 DNS	THR; 1; 23	THR; 2 Ret	THR; 3 Ret	OUL; 1; 22	OUL; 2 Ret	OUL; 3; 16																31st	-5
2023	One Motorsport with Starline Racing	Honda Civic Type R																CRO; 1; 24	CRO; 2; 23	CRO; 3; 16	KNO; 1; 17	KNO; 2 Ret	KNO; 3; 21	DON; 1; 25	DON; 2; 21	DON; 3; 19	SIL; 1; 16	SIL; 2; 22	SIL; 3; 20	BRH; 1; 19	BRH; 2; 17	BRH; 3 Ret	31st	-5

^{*} Season still in progress.
