= Michael Crees =

British racing driver (born 1983)

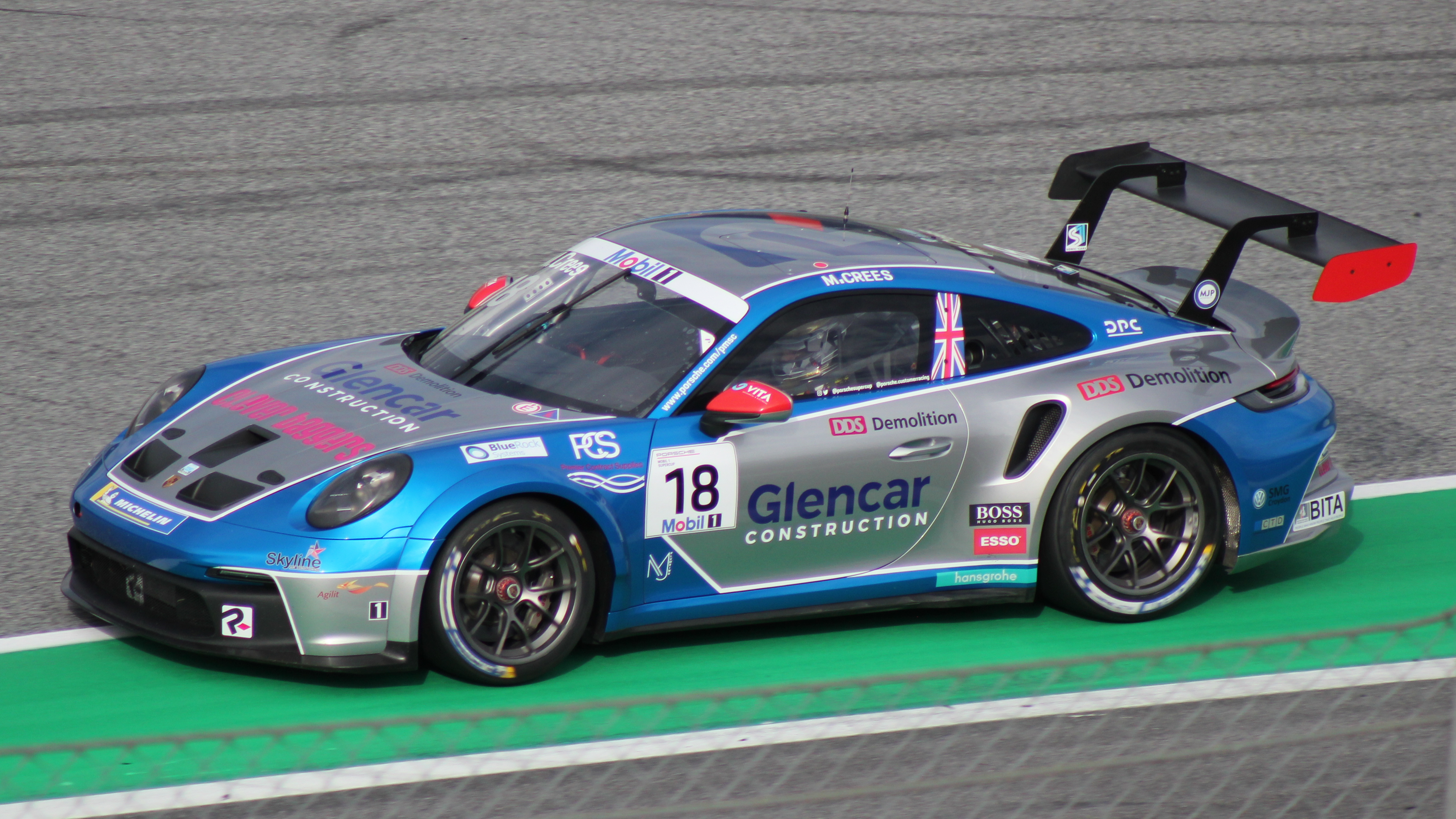
- Crees driving at the Red Bull Ring in 2021
- Nationality: (United Kingdom) British
- Born: Michael Sean Crees; 7 September 1983 (age 43) Broadstairs, Kent, England

British Touring Car Championship career
- Debut season: 2019
- Current team: Team VERTU
- Categorisation: FIA Bronze
- Car number: 777
- Former teams: Power Maxed Racing, Tony Gilham Racing, BTC Racing
- Starts: 106 (108 entries)
- Wins: 0
- Poles: 0
- Fastest laps: 0
- Best finish: 17th in 2020

Previous series
- 2018: Ginetta GT4 Supercup

Championship titles
- 2020: Jack Sears Trophy

Michael Sean Crees (born 7 September 1983) is a British racing driver from England best known for his appearances in the British Touring Car Championship.

== Racing career ==
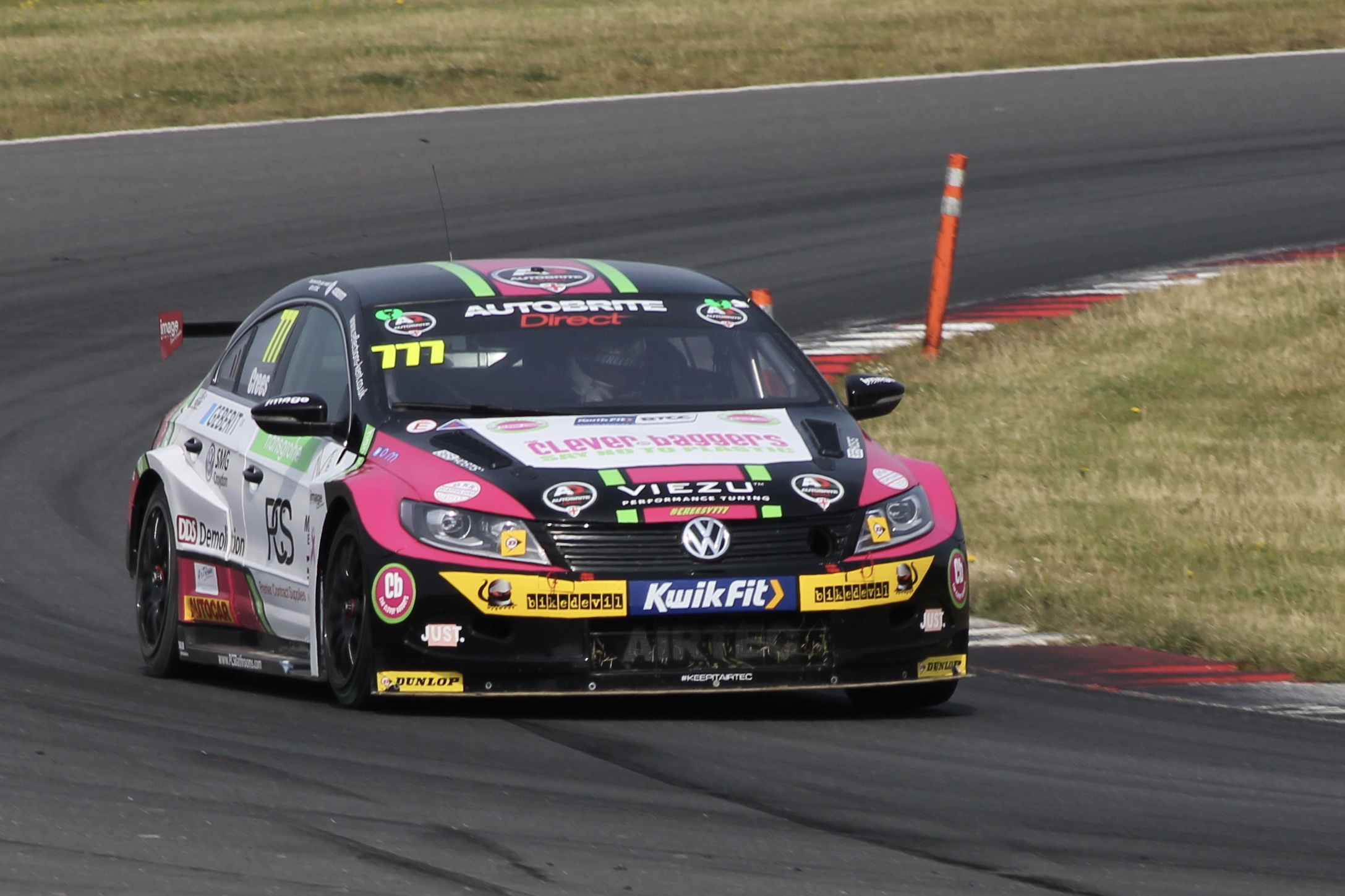
Crees driving the Team HARD Volkswagen CC at Snetterton during the 2019 British Touring Car Championship season.

A relative latecomer to racing, Crees joined the BTCC grid in 2019 after spending the previous season in the Ginetta GT4 Supercup, where he secured the Am Class title.

Crees' debut season saw him compete for Team HARD at the wheel of a Volkswagen CC, and he secured a points scoring finish on his debut at Brands Hatch. His best result would come later in the season at Silverstone Circuit, where Crees broke into the top ten for the first time.

Having switched to BTC Racing for 2020 to drive a Honda Civic Type R, Crees would match his personal best result of ninth and was a regular points scorer as he secured the Jack Sears Trophy.

Crees re-signed with BTC Racing for a second season but the two parted company little more than a week before the opening rounds.

Instead, Crees signed up with Parker Revs Motorsport to contest the Porsche Supercup after Josh Webster was forced to stand down from his drive for family reasons.

== Racing record ==
=== Racing career summary ===
Season	Series	Team	Races	Wins	Poles	F/Laps	Podiums	Points	Position
2018	Ginetta GT4 Supercup - Am	Century Motorsport	23	11	6	14	19	673	**1st**
2019	British Touring Car Championship	GKR Scaffolding with Autobrite Direct	30	0	0	0	0	11	26th
2020	British Touring Car Championship	The Clever Baggers with BTC Racing	27	0	0	0	0	50	17th
2021	Porsche Supercup	Team Parker Racing	3	0	0	0	0	0	27th
2022	British Touring Car Championship	CarStore Power Maxed Racing	30	0	0	0	0	50	20th
2023	British Touring Car Championship	Autobrite Direct with Millers Oils	14	0	0	0	0	13	23rd
2023	British GT Championship - GT4	Raceway Motorsport	5	0	0	0	1	15	16th
2023	GT4 European Series - Pro-Am	Elite Motorsport with Entire Race Engineering	2	0	1	0	0	1	27th
2024	Porsche Supercup	Martinet / Forestier Racing	1	0	0	0	0	0	NC†
2025	British Touring Car Championship	Team VERTU	6	0	0	0	0	5	25th

^{†} As Crees was a guest driver, he was ineligible for points.

=== Complete British Touring Car Championship results ===
(key) Races in bold indicate pole position (1 point awarded) Races in italics indicate fastest lap (1 point awarded all races) * signifies that driver lead race for at least one lap (1 point awarded all races)

Year	Team	Car	1	2	3	4	5	6	7	8	9	10	11	12	13	14	15	16	17	18	19	20	21	22	23	24	25	26	27	28	29	30	DC	Points
2019	GKR Scaffolding with Autobrite Direct	Volkswagen CC	BRH; 1; 12	BRH; 2; 23	BRH; 3; 18	DON; 1; 21	DON; 2; 16	DON; 3 Ret	THR; 1; 26	THR; 2; 26	THR; 3; 22	CRO; 1 Ret	CRO; 2; 25	CRO; 3; 27	OUL; 1; 26	OUL; 2; 24	OUL; 3; 22	SNE; 1; 27	SNE; 2; 22	SNE; 3 Ret	THR; 1; 23	THR; 2; 25	THR; 3; 25	KNO; 1 Ret	KNO; 2; 27	KNO; 3; 24	SIL; 1 Ret	SIL; 2; 19	SIL; 3; 9	BRH; 1; 24	BRH; 2; 23	BRH; 3 Ret	26th	11
2020	The Clever Baggers with BTC Racing	Honda Civic Type R (FK8)	DON; 1; 16	DON; 2; 14	DON; 3; 13	BRH; 1; 12	BRH; 2 Ret	BRH; 3; 11	OUL; 1; 11	OUL; 2; 12	OUL; 3 Ret	KNO; 1; 17	KNO; 2; 17	KNO; 3; 16	THR; 1; 10	THR; 2; 9	THR; 3; 21	SIL; 1 Ret	SIL; 2 Ret	SIL; 3 Ret	CRO; 1; 22	CRO; 2 Ret	CRO; 3 Ret	SNE; 1; 10	SNE; 2; 14	SNE; 3; 14	BRH; 1; 20	BRH; 2; 13	BRH; 3; 15				17th	50
2022	CarStore Power Maxed Racing	Vauxhall Astra	DON; 1; 14	DON; 2; 15	DON; 3; 16	BRH; 1; 12	BRH; 2 Ret	BRH; 3 DNS	THR; 1; 13	THR; 2; 12	THR; 3; 8	OUL; 1; 14	OUL; 2; 13	OUL; 3 Ret	CRO; 1; 16	CRO; 2 Ret	CRO; 3 Ret	KNO; 1; 26	KNO; 2; 19	KNO; 3; 16	SNE; 1 Ret	SNE; 2; 21	SNE; 3; 18	THR; 1; 8	THR; 2; 9	THR; 3; 8	SIL; 1; 16	SIL; 2; 19	SIL; 3; 20	BRH; 1; 20	BRH; 2; 21	BRH; 3 Ret	20th	50
2023	Autobrite Direct with Millers Oils	Cupra León	DON; 1	DON; 2	DON; 3	BRH; 1	BRH; 2	BRH; 3	SNE; 1	SNE; 2	SNE; 3	THR; 1	THR; 2	THR; 3	OUL; 1	OUL; 2	OUL; 3	CRO; 1; 21	CRO; 2; 19	CRO; 3; 11	KNO; 1; 20	KNO; 2; 18	KNO; 3 Ret	DON; 1; 20	DON; 2; 19	DON; 3; 17	SIL; 1; 12	SIL; 2; 12	SIL; 3 Ret	BRH; 1; 24	BRH; 2 Ret	BRH; 3 DNS	23rd	13
2025	Team VERTU	Hyundai i30 Fastback N Performance	DON; 1; 18	DON; 2; 17	DON; 3; 19	BRH; 1; 13	BRH; 2; 14	BRH; 3; 16	SNE; 1	SNE; 2	SNE; 3	THR; 1	THR; 2	THR; 3	OUL; 1	OUL; 2	OUL; 3	CRO; 1	CRO; 2	CRO; 3	KNO; 1	KNO; 2	KNO; 3	DON; 1	DON; 2	DON; 3	SIL; 1	SIL; 2	SIL; 3	BRH; 1	BRH; 2	BRH; 3	25th	5

=== Complete Porsche Supercup results ===
(key) (Races in bold indicate Pole Position) (Races in italics indicate fastest lap)

Year	Team	1	2	3	4	5	6	7	8	Pos.	Points
2021	Team Parker Racing	MON; Ret	RBR; 27	RBR; 23	HUN	SPA	ZND	MNZ	MNZ	27th	0
2024	Martinet / Forestier Racing	IMO	MON	RBR	SIL; 27	HUN	SPA	ZND	MNZ	NC†	0†

^{†} As Crees was a guest driver, he was ineligible for points.

=== Complete British GT Championship results ===
(key) (Races in bold indicate pole position) (Races in italics indicate fastest lap)

Year	Team	Car	Class	1	2	3	4	5	6	7	8	9	DC	Points
2023	Raceway Motorsport	Ginetta G56 GT4	GT4	OUL; 1; 19	OUL; 2; 34	SIL; 1; 30	DON; 1	SNE; 1 DSQ	SNE; 2 DSQ	ALG; 1	BRH; 1	DON; 1	16th	15

Sporting positions
Preceded by Rory Butcher	Jack Sears Trophy; Winner; 2020	Succeeded by Daniel Rowbottom
