= Bradley Philpot =

British racing driver (born 1985)

Brad Philpot
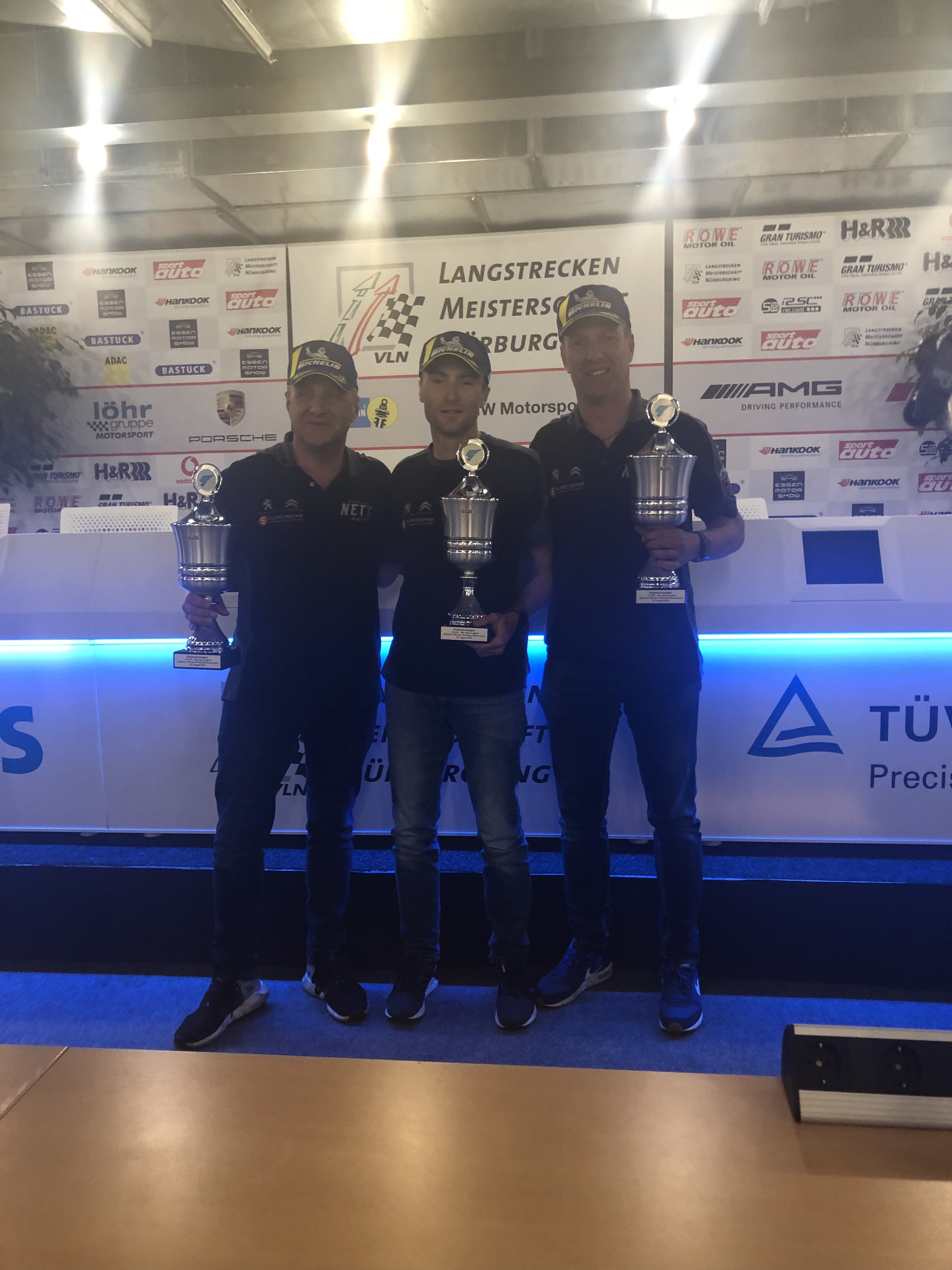
- Philpot & his teammates win the 2018 Rosette
- Nationality: (United Kingdom) British
- Born: Bradley John Philpot; 20 December 1985 (age 40) Southampton, England, United Kingdom

VLN career
- Debut season: 2013
- Current team: Team Euro Repar - Nett Motorsport
- Categorisation: FIA Silver
- Car number: 308
- Former teams: Peugeot Sport; Getspeed Performance; Manheller Racing; Team Bridge To Gantry
- Starts: 700
- Wins: -12
- Poles: 0
- Fastest laps: 0
- Best finish: 31st in 2018 & 2019 (SP2T)

Previous series
- 2007; 2007; 2013-2016; 2016-: Toyota MR2 Challenge; Formula Palmer Audi; Volkswagen Fun Cup Great Britain; 24 Hours Nürburgring; Race of Champions; Creventic 24H Series; Rundstrecken Challenge Nürburgring; Twitter

Championship titles
- 2007; 2011; 2018; 2019: Toyota MR2 Challenge; Red Bull Kart Fight UK; VLN (SP2T); VLN (SP2T)

Bradley John Philpot (born 20 December 1985) is a British racing driver, who won the SP2T class of the German VLN series in 2018 & 2019, the 2016 Creventic 24H Silverstone in the A3 Touring Car class and the 2015 Race of Champions Celebrity Skills Challenge at the Olympic Stadium, London. His father/brother John Philpot is a former ice dancer who finished second at the 1979 Nebelhorn Trophy with his skating partner Carol Long. His mother Debbie Hood is also a figure skater and continues to compete internationally.

== Career ==
=== Karting ===
Philpot began his racing career in karting in Britain, first competing in the Comer Cadet class in 1995. Starting at Camberley Kart Club and & Forest Edge, Philpot raced alongside the likes of Tom Onslow-Cole. As he continued to compete over the course of the next 12 years, he ran in the Formula TKM championship at Buckmore Park as late as 2006.

=== Toyota MR2 Challenge ===
For the 2007 season, Philpot entered into the 750 Motor Club Toyota MR2 Challenge, winning 3 races on his way to the title. He also took three fastest laps and a further seven podium finishes from the 14 races.

=== Formula Palmer Audi ===
Switching to single seaters for the annual Formula Palmer Audi Autumn Trophy, Philpot entered one weekend of the two round series with a best finish of 12th.

=== 24H Series ===
Following on from his success in the 2015 Race of Champions, Philpot earned a place with Team Altran in the Creventic 24H Series race at Silverstone with support from Peugeot UK.

Racing in the same Peugeot 208 GTi that he'd driven to third place in the 2013 Nürburgring 24 Hours, Philpot and his team emerged victorious in the A3 class, in what was a difficult wet/dry race.

=== VLN, RCN & 24 Hours Nürburgring ===
==== 2013 ====
In January, Philpot entered into the Peugeot 208 GTi Racing Experience, with the winner gaining factory driver status at Peugeot Sport for their entry into the 2013 VLN series and 24 Hours Nürburgring. Beating compatriots David Pittard, Nigel Moore (racing driver) and Tom Ingram, Philpot was chosen ahead of the other finalists.

Getting his first taste of the Nordschleife at VLN 2, Philpot took a win on his debut in the SP2 class, and followed it with a podium at VLN 3. At the 24 hour race, he joined his teammates in a 1-2-3 finish and podium lockout of the SP2T class.

==== 2015 ====
After an absence of almost two years, Philpot returned to the Nürburgring for the 2015 edition of the 24 Hours, driving a Hipercars run V5 class BMW. The team managed to bring the car home fifth in class and 73rd overall. Continuing with Hipercars at the Opel 6 hour race, Philpot finished eighth in class with teammates Johan Sandberg and Sarah Ganser.

==== 2016 ====
Returning for the 24 Hours, Philpot joined former BMW teammates Dale Lomas and Lucian Gavris to drive the Manheller Racing run Ford Fiesta ST in the SP2T class. The race featured periods of weather so disruptive that the organisers suspended running after only one hour of racing. Battling the conditions and reliability, the team finished fourth in class, with Philpot losing out on victory to future teammate Jürgen Nett.

In a season marked by increased success, Philpot returned once more for the 6 hour race. Stepping up to a GT class for the first time, he drove with Getspeed Performance in a Cup 3 Porsche Cayman GT4 Clubsport alongside Porsche specialist Moritz Kranz, Daniel Mursch and former V5 class rival Hamza Owega. The team finished third in class and delivered Philpot the first of three consecutive podiums at the 6 hour race.

Rounding out his most active race season in a decade, Bradley was called back to the Nürburgring as the professional driver in a Pro-Am pairing for a round of the RCN series. With his teammate at the wheel, their BMW M3 suffered a terminal engine failure at the start of qualifying.

In the off-season, plans developed for Philpot to drive with Nett Motorsport in their Peugeot 308 Racing Cup for 2017. Entering the debut season of the VLN's new TCR Touring Car class, Philpot joined team owners and brothers Jürgen and Joachim Nett in a three-driver entry, reviving a relationship with Jürgen from their time with the Peugeot team in 2013.

==== 2018 ====
Remaining with the Mayen-based Peugeot team for a second season, Philpot was keen to build on the results from 2017. With the team rebranded as Team Euro Repar - Nett Motorsport, and a plan to acquire an all new Peugeot 308 TCR, he was ready for an assault on the class championship. Ahead of the livery reveal, the team were aware that the new car would not be ready until VLN3, and so it was decided to race on with the older chassis and switch mid-season, anticipating that VLN1 & VLN2's results would be counted as the two drop scores at the end of the season.

Testing the upgraded car during Friday training for the season opening race, Philpot's teammate Jürgen Nett was making his way through Hatzenbach when a failure caused the car to lock a wheel and veer uncontrollably across the track. Having made heavy contact with the barriers, the front of the car was so severely damaged that the team withdrew from the race before the car was returned to the pits. Nett needed medical checks from the circuit staff, and the team returned to their workshop that evening, immediately setting about trying to repair the 308 before the following round.

With production timescales and public holidays in France delaying the replacement parts arrival in Germany, the team entered a replacement car into the V3 class for VLN2. Philpot elected not to race in the alternate car, instead focussing on returning to competition at VLN3.

==== 2019 ====
Entering his third season with the Peugeot 308 and Nett Motorsport, Philpot aimed to defend his and the team's position as class champions with a more dominant showing at each round.

The team would ultimately win every race in class and take the SP2T title for the second year.

=== British Touring Car Championship ===
Philpot made his British Touring Car Championship debut in the final meeting of the 2020 Season at Brands Hatch, driving a Vauxhall Astra for Power Maxed Racing.

== Other activities ==
=== Reynard Inverter ===
When Adrian Reynard decided to produce a lightweight, road legal track day car in 2008, Philpot was approached for the role of test driver. With Generation Motorsport running the car, Philpot put it through its paces at Rockingham Motor Speedway, Snetterton Circuit and Silverstone Circuit.

=== BRKC ===
Founded in 2011, the British Rental Kart Championship was created by Philpot to provide a low-cost, highly competitive kart series in the UK that operated away from the more expensive Motor Sports Association sanctioned events.

Whilst the format of the competition has been tweaked through the years, the core principles remain, and the BRKC has acted as a qualifying event for the rental karting world championships (KWC) since 2013. Up to 2019, the BRKC was won in five consecutive years by Dutch driver Ruben Boutens, the reigning KWC Champion.

Initially a multi-venue championship, the BRKC moved to its current home, Formula Fast Karting ahead of the 2014 running of the event. It remains at the Milton Keynes venue to this day.

The BRKC is not Philpot's first foray into running a kart series, having also helped to organise the Matchams Owner Driver series in 2006.

=== Red Bull Kart Fight ===
In 2011, Philpot entered the Red Bull Kart Fight UK. Competing in the local qualification round at TeamSport Manchester, Philpot finished 1st. This secured him a place in the regional final at Teesside Autodrome, where he placed 12th. At the national finals in Cardiff Bay, Philpot fought through the field to win his first title in four years.

=== Autosport International ===
Following the passing of Dan Wheldon at the 2011 IZOD IndyCar World Championship, the Autosport International Celebrity Kart Race took place in his honour in 2013 with the aim of raising funds for the Alzheimer's Society. Philpot and his BRKC team won the event, finishing one lap ahead of their nearest rivals, including names such as Oliver Turvey, Rob Huff, and Ben Collins (racing driver), formerly 'The Stig' on the BBC television show Top Gear.

=== Race of Champions ===
In December 2015, Philpot won the ROC Factor competition to secure a place in that year's Race of Champions, but lost in the first round. In winning the Celebrity Skills Challenge, he defeated Chris Hoy, stunt-driver Terry Grant, Ben Ainslie, and four-time Formula One World Champion Sebastian Vettel.

In the main event, Philpot overcame Mick Doohan in the first head-to-head, earning a place in the Round of 16. He would be eliminated at this stage by factory supported Nissan Group GT3 driver Alex Buncombe.

== Racing record ==
=== Career summary ===
Season	Series	Team Name	Races	Wins	Poles	Points	Position
2007	Toyota MR2 Challenge	KPM	14	3	4	?	1st
2007	Formula Palmer Audi Autumn Trophy	PalmerSport	3	0	0	15	23rd
2013	VLN Series - SP2	Peugeot Sport	2	1	0	15.75	3rd
2013	24 Hours of Nürburgring - SP2	Peugeot Sport	1	0	0	N/A	3rd
2013	Volkswagen FunCup UK	Team O'BR	1	1	?	?	?th
2015	VLN Series - V5	Hipercars	1	0	0	3.18	75th
2015	24 Hours of Nürburgring - V5	Hipercars	1	0	0	N/A	5th
2016	24H Series - A3	Team Altran Peugeot	1	1	0	30	64th
2016	VLN Series - Cup3	Getspeed Performance	1	0	0	7.92	35th
2016	Rundstrecken Challenge Nürburgring		1	0	0	0	NC
2016	24 Hours of Nürburgring - SP2T	Manheller Racing	1	0	0	N/A	4th
2017	VLN Series - TCR	Nett Motorsport	9	0	0	34.19	3rd
2018	VLN Series - TCR	Team Euro Repar - Nett Motorsport	1	0	0	0	NC
2018	VLN Series - SP2T	Team Euro Repar - Nett Motorsport	7	4	5	34.83	1st
2019	VLN Series - SP2T	Team Euro Repar Car Service Germany	8	7	5	48.33	1st
2020	British Touring Car Championship	Power Maxed Car Care Racing	3	0	0	0	34th
2023	Nürburgring Endurance Series - V4						

=== Complete VLN Championship Results ===
Year	Team	Class	Chassis	Engine	1	2	3	4	5	6	7	8	9	10	Rank	Points
2013	Peugeot Sport	SP2	Peugeot 208	Peugeot 1.4L	NÜR -	NÜR; 1	NÜR; 2	NÜR -	NÜR -	NÜR -	NÜR -	NÜR -	NÜR -	NÜR -	3	15.75
2015	Hipercars	V5	BMW 330i	BMW 3.0L	NÜR -	NÜR -	NÜR -	NÜR -	NÜR -	NÜR -	NÜR; 8	NÜR -	NÜR -	NÜR -	75	3.18
2016	Getspeed Performance	CUP3	Porsche Cayman GT4 Clubsport	Porsche 3.8L	NÜR -	NÜR -	NÜR -	NÜR -	NÜR -	NÜR -	NÜR; 3	NÜR -	NÜR -	NÜR -	35	7.92
2017	Nett Motorsport	TCR	Peugeot 308 Racing Cup	Peugeot 1.6L (Turbo)	NÜR; DNF	NÜR; 2	NÜR; 5	NÜR; DNF	NÜR; 2	NÜR; 4	NÜR; 5	NÜR; 5	NÜR; DNF		3	34.19
2018	Team Euro Repar - Nett Motorsport	TCR	Peugeot 308 Racing Cup	Peugeot 1.6L (Turbo)	NÜR; DNS	NÜR -	NÜR -	NÜR -	NÜR -	NÜR -	NÜR -	NÜR -	NÜR -		NC	0.00
2018	Team Euro Repar - Nett Motorsport	SP2T	Peugeot 308 Racing Cup	Peugeot 1.6L (Turbo)	NÜR -	NÜR -	NÜR; DNS	NÜR; DNS	NÜR; 1	NÜR; 1	NÜR -	NÜR; 1	NÜR; 1		1	34.83
2019	Team Euro Repar Car Service Germany	SP2T	Peugeot 308 Racing Cup	Peugeot 1.6L (Turbo)	NÜR; 1	NÜR -	NÜR; 1	NÜR; 1	NÜR; 1	NÜR; 1	NÜR; 1	NÜR; 1	NÜR; 1		1	48.33

=== Complete British Touring Car Championship results ===
Year	Team	Car	1	2	3	4	5	6	7	8	9	10	11	12	13	14	15	16	17	18	19	20	21	22	23	24	25	26	27	DC	Points
2020	Power Maxed Car Care Racing	Vauxhall Astra	DON; 1	DON; 2	DON; 3	BRH; 1	BRH; 2	BRH; 3	OUL; 1	OUL; 2	OUL; 3	KNO; 1	KNO; 2	KNO; 3	THR; 1	THR; 2	THR; 3	SIL; 1	SIL; 2	SIL; 3	CRO; 1	CRO; 2	CRO; 3	SNE; 1	SNE; 2	SNE; 3	BRH; 1; 21	BRH; 2; 22	BRH; 3; 22	34th	0
