= Adrian Flux =

Insurance broker founded in 1973

- Office in Norwich, UK
- Type: Private company
- Industry: Insurance
- Founded: 1973; 53 years ago
- Founder: Adrian Flux
- Headquarters: King's Lynn, Norfolk, United Kingdom
- Area served: United Kingdom
- Services: Specialist vehicle insurance
- Owner: Flux family
- Number of employees: 1,850 (2023)
- Website: www.adrianflux.co.uk

Adrian Flux is a British insurance broker that has its head office at East Winch Hall in King's Lynn, Norfolk. The company has become the country’s largest specialist motor insurance broker and employs around 1,850 staff.

== History ==
Registered office at East Winch Hall

The family-run business was formed by Adrian Flux in 1973. In the 1980's it was based in a small office on London Road, Kings Lynn. In 1990, it expanded by creating a specialist motorcycle division called Bikesure. As of 2017, Bikesure has its own office in North Lynn, Norfolk.

In 1999, Adrian’s son David took over the running of the company after working his way up from the position of a clerk.

In 2005, the company acquired Bishop’s Stortford-based Herts Insurance Consultants (HIC). This has since been rebranded as Sterling Insurance.

In 2010, more than 3,000 extra policyholders were gained when Adrian Flux acquired Chartwell, a provider of insurance for disabled drivers. The companies already had historical links with Chartwell trading under the name Adrian Flux until 1973 when Adrian, a disabled driver himself, moved his business from Middlesex to Norfolk and June Richardson started to run Chartwell as its own entity.

In 2016, Adrian Flux gained huge publicity as a result of launching what it described as the UK’s and “possibly the world’s” first driverless car insurance policy.

In 2017, Adrian Flux stepped in to save more than 100 jobs at the Norwich branch of Swinton Insurance by taking over the lease of its call centre that was due to close. This gave the company its first office in the city.

In 2020, the drive to expand continued with 185 people being hired as the business adapted to working remotely during the COVID-19 lockdowns.

== Sponsorship ==
=== Motorsport ===
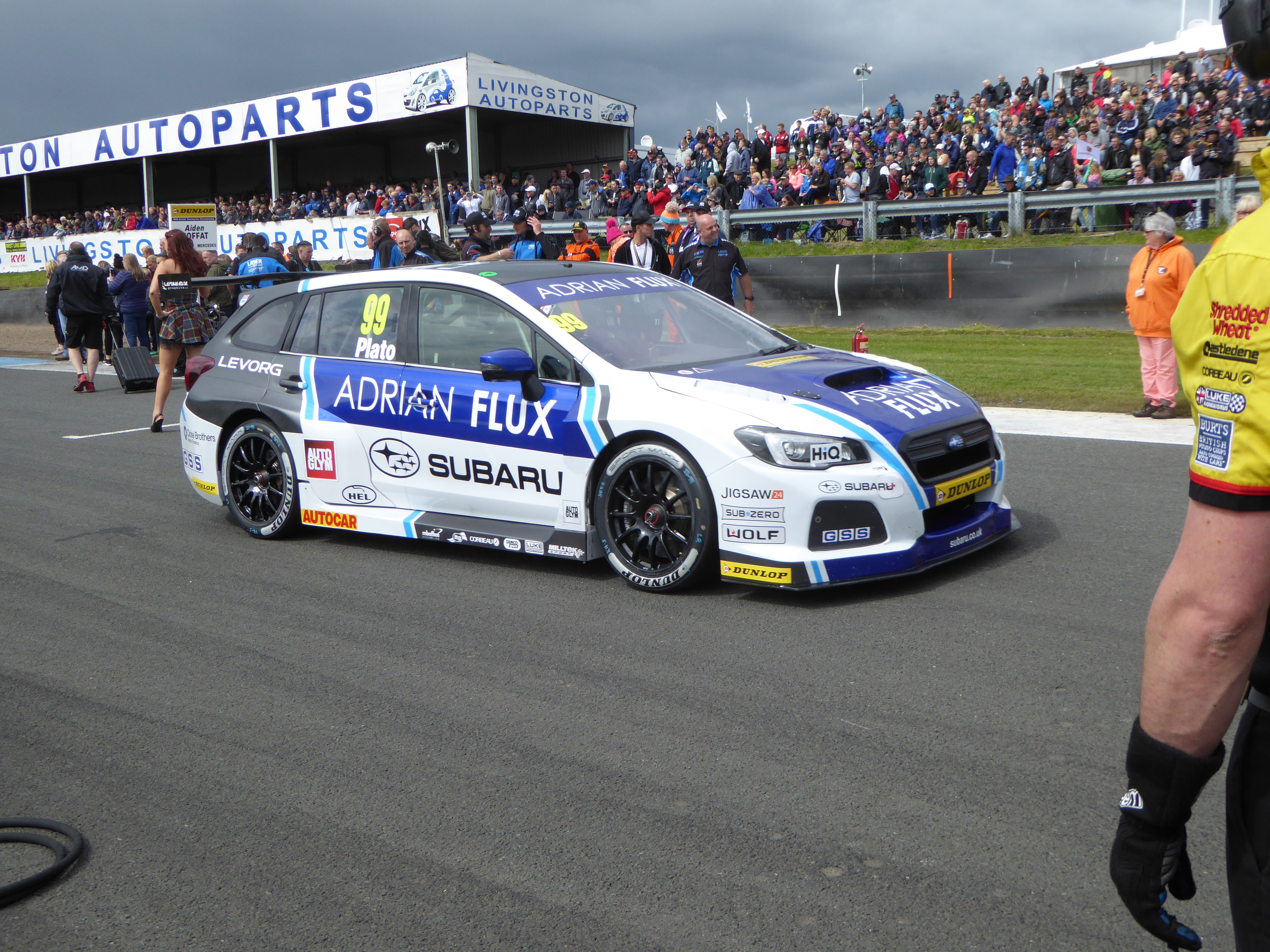
Adrian Flux-sponsored car, 2017

Adrian Flux has had sponsorship deals in the British Touring Car Championship with a number of high-profile teams and figures including Jason Plato, Power Maxed Racing's Vauxhall Astra and Team BMR's Subaru Levorg GT.

It has been the title sponsor of all-disabled motorsport outfit Team BRIT.

Endurance driver and IndyCar driver Callum Ilott has also been backed by Adrian Flux throughout his motorsport career.

=== Venues ===
Adrian Flux has sponsored King's Lynn Stadium, a motorcycle, banger racing and stock car venue. They have also sponsored King's Lynn Town F.C. club's main stand.

The brand has also been the lead brand associated with the British FIM Speedway Grand Prix.

Adrian Flux has also sponsored King's Lynn's Festival Too music extravaganza.

The Waterfront, an entertainment and night club venue located in Norwich, is also protected by Adrian Flux.

=== Other Sports ===
Flux has also invested in the Lap of Anglia, a cycling fundraising event.

== Controversy ==
In 2021, comedian Joe Lycett criticised Adrian Flux’s black box on his Got Your Back Channel 4 programme. The company responded by stating problems with the GPS coverage caused a customer’s incorrect journey data to be recorded and reimbursed them £150 as a gesture of goodwill.

== Recognition ==
The company has won several awards for its offerings:

- Total 911 magazine best Porsche insurance specialist 2015
- WhatVan? insurer of the year 2019 2021 2023
- Intelligent Instructor driving instructor of the year 2019, 2021, 2022 and 2023
- UK Company Culture Awards best flexible working policy and best culture transformation initiative 2023
