= Albert Taylor (cricketer) =

English cricketer

Personal information
- Full name: Albert Edward Taylor
- Born: 14 June 1894; Nuneaton, Warwickshire, England
- Died: 19 August 1960 (aged 66); Rotherham, Yorkshire, England
- Batting: Right-handed
- Bowling: Right-arm medium-fast

Domestic team information
- Years: Team
- 1927: Warwickshire

Career statistics
Competition	First-class
Matches	1
Runs scored	0
Batting average	0.00
100s/50s	–/–
Top score	0
Balls bowled	30
Wickets	–
Bowling average	–
5 wickets in innings	–
10 wickets in match	–
Best bowling	–
Catches/stumpings	–/–
- Source: Cricinfo, 11 October 2015

Albert Edward Taylor (14 June 1894 – 19 August 1960) was an English cricketer who made one appearance in first-class cricket in 1927.

== Career ==
Taylor was selected to play what would be his only first-class cricket match when picked for Warwickshire against Somerset in the County Championship at Taunton. In a match which ended in a draw, Taylor bowled 5 overs without taking a wicket in Somerset's only innings, while in Warwickshire's only innings he was dismissed bowled by Jack White for a duck.

== Death ==
He died at Rotherham, Yorkshire on 19 August 1960.
