= Herbert Taylor (English cricketer) =

English cricketer

Herbert Taylor (22 February 1910 – 20 April 1993) was an English first-class cricketer active 1928–48 who played for Middlesex. He was born in Accrington; died in Enfield, Lancashire.
