= Jake Hill =

Jake Hill may refer to:

- Jake Hill (racing driver) (born 1994), British racing driver
- Jake Hill (musician) (born 1992), American rapper and singer

== See also ==
- Jacob Hill, a character in the American sitcom Abbot Elementary
