= Alfred Taylor (rugby union) =

Rugby union player from Northern Ireland

- Full name: Alfred Squire Taylor
- Born: 6 July 1889 Belfast, Ireland
- Died: 31 July 1917 (aged 28) Ypres, Belgium
- School: Campbell College
- University: Queen's University Belfast; University of Edinburgh
- Occupation: Medical doctor

Rugby union career
- Position: Centre
International career
Years	Team	Apps	(Points)
1910–12	Ireland	4	(3)

Captain Alfred Squire Taylor (6 July 1889 — 31 July 1917) was an Irish international rugby union player.

== Biography ==
Born in Belfast, Taylor was the son of Presbyterian minister David Alexander Taylor, a one-time moderator of the General Assembly, and attended Campbell College. He undertook further studies at Queen's University and Edinburgh University, playing varsity rugby with both and captaining the latter. A centre, Taylor was capped four times for Ireland, including all three of their 1910 Five Nations matches. He returned for the 1912 Five Nations opener in Paris, scoring a try to help defeat France, with Ireland going on to finish as joint champions.

Taylor received his medical degree in 1914 and joined the Royal Army Medical Corps as a medical officer. Attached to the 10th/11th Battalion, Highland Light Infantry, Taylor was injured during the Siege of Kut in Mesopotamia, then later took part in the Battle of the Somme. He was killed in action on 31 July 1917, the result of a shell explosion.

== See also ==
- List of Ireland national rugby union players
