= Alf Taylor (cricketer) =

English cricketer

Personal information
- Full name: Alfred George Taylor
- Born: 9 December 1891; West Ham, Essex, England
- Batting: Unknown
- Bowling: Unknown

Domestic team information
- Years: Team
- 1923: Essex

Career statistics
Competition	First-class
Matches	2
Runs scored	7
Batting average	2.33
100s/50s	–/–
Top score	7
Balls bowled	114
Wickets	1
Bowling average	77.00
5 wickets in innings	–
10 wickets in match	–
Best bowling	1/40
Catches/stumpings	–/–
- Source: Cricinfo, 25 October 2011

Alfred George Taylor (29 December 1891 – date of death unknown) was an English cricketer. Taylor's batting and bowling styles are unknown. He was born at West Ham, Essex.

Taylor made his first-class debut for Essex against Derbyshire in the 1923 County Championship. He scored 7 runs in Essex's first-innings, before being dismissed by Arthur Morton, while in Derbyshire's first-innings he took Morton's wicket for the cost of 40 runs from 11 overs. Days after this match he played his second and final first-class match against Surrey, He scored no further runs or took any wickets in the match.

His date of death is not known.
