= Bert Tayler =

English cricketer

Bert Tayler (6 December 1887 – 17 April 1984) was an English cricketer. He was a right-handed batsman and a right-arm medium-pace bowler. He was born in Gloucestershire and died in Dawlish.

Tayler's first-class cricketing career began in the 1914 season, when he played two County Championship games for Gloucestershire. The team finished bottom of the 1914 County Championship before the competition was abandoned for the next four years because of the First World War.

Tayler involved himself in the war, serving as a sergeant in the Royal Artillery and Tank Corps, and, in 1918, moved to Cardiff. It was this relocation which qualified him to play for his new team, Glamorgan, for whom he made his debut in 1920 and played in ten County Championship games between 1921 and 1927.

Tayler continued to live in Cardiff, where he and his uncle ran a tobacco manufacturing business, but settled later in his life in Devon, where he died at the age of 96.
