= One Motorsport =

British motor racing team

(United Kingdom) One Motorsport
- Founded: 2006
- Team principal(s): Steve Dudman
- Current series: BTCC
- Current drivers: TBA; TBA
- Noted drivers: (United Kingdom) Jason Plato (United Kingdom) Josh Cook (United Kingdom) Dan Cammish (United Kingdom) Senna Proctor (United Kingdom) Stephen Jelley (United Kingdom) Aiden Moffat (United Kingdom) Jade Edwards (United Kingdom) Tom Chilton (United Kingdom) Michael Crees
- Teams' Championships: 1
- Drivers' Championships: 0
- Website: www.onemotorsport.co.uk

One Motorsport, formerly known as BTC Racing, is a British auto racing team based in Brackley, Northamptonshire owned and run by Steve Dudman. The team is best known for competing in the British Touring Car Championship.

== British Touring Car Championship ==
=== Lexus IS (2006–2007) ===
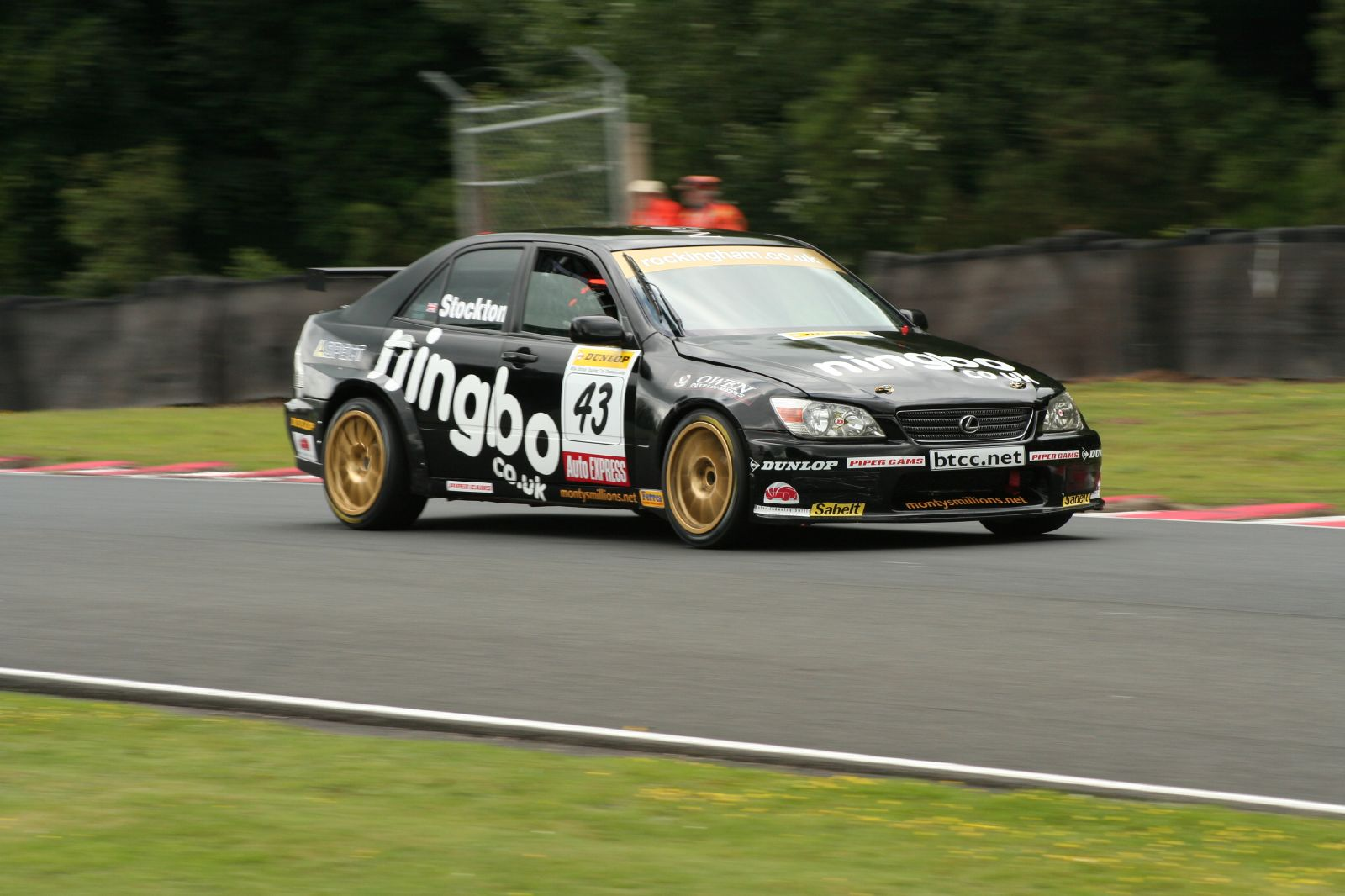
Chris Stockton driving a BTC-run Lexus IS200 at the Oulton Park round of the 2007 British Touring Car Championship season.

They ran 2 Lexus IS 200 cars for Chris Stockton and Darren Dowling in the latter two rounds of the 2006 British Touring Car Championship season in preparation for a fuller campaign the following season.

They retained Stockton for 2007 but signed Nick Leason as their second driver, although he ultimately only contested the first 3 rounds.

=== Lexus IS and SEAT Toledo (2008) ===
For 2008, Stockton was joined initially by truck racing champion Stuart Oliver. They replaced the Lexus cars with ex-Motorbase SEATs after two rounds, but had little success. The team missed round 6 at Snetterton after reported financial problems. Gareth Howell made two appearances in place of Oliver. The team were looking to enter the 2009 British Touring Car Championship season with two SEAT Leóns, but decided against this.

=== Chevrolet Cruze (2014) ===
The team returned to the BTCC in 2014 with Chris Stockton driving an NGTC Chevrolet Cruze, which was originally built for Silverline Chevrolet, however the car was never completed as RML decided not to race in 2012.

The team originally planned to enter during 2013, but made the decision to concentrate on building their NGTC Chevrolet Cruze hatchback.

In 2015, the team's TBL was sold to their title sponsor Automotive Brands who set up a two car Power Maxed Racing as a separate operation.

=== Chevrolet Cruze (2017) ===
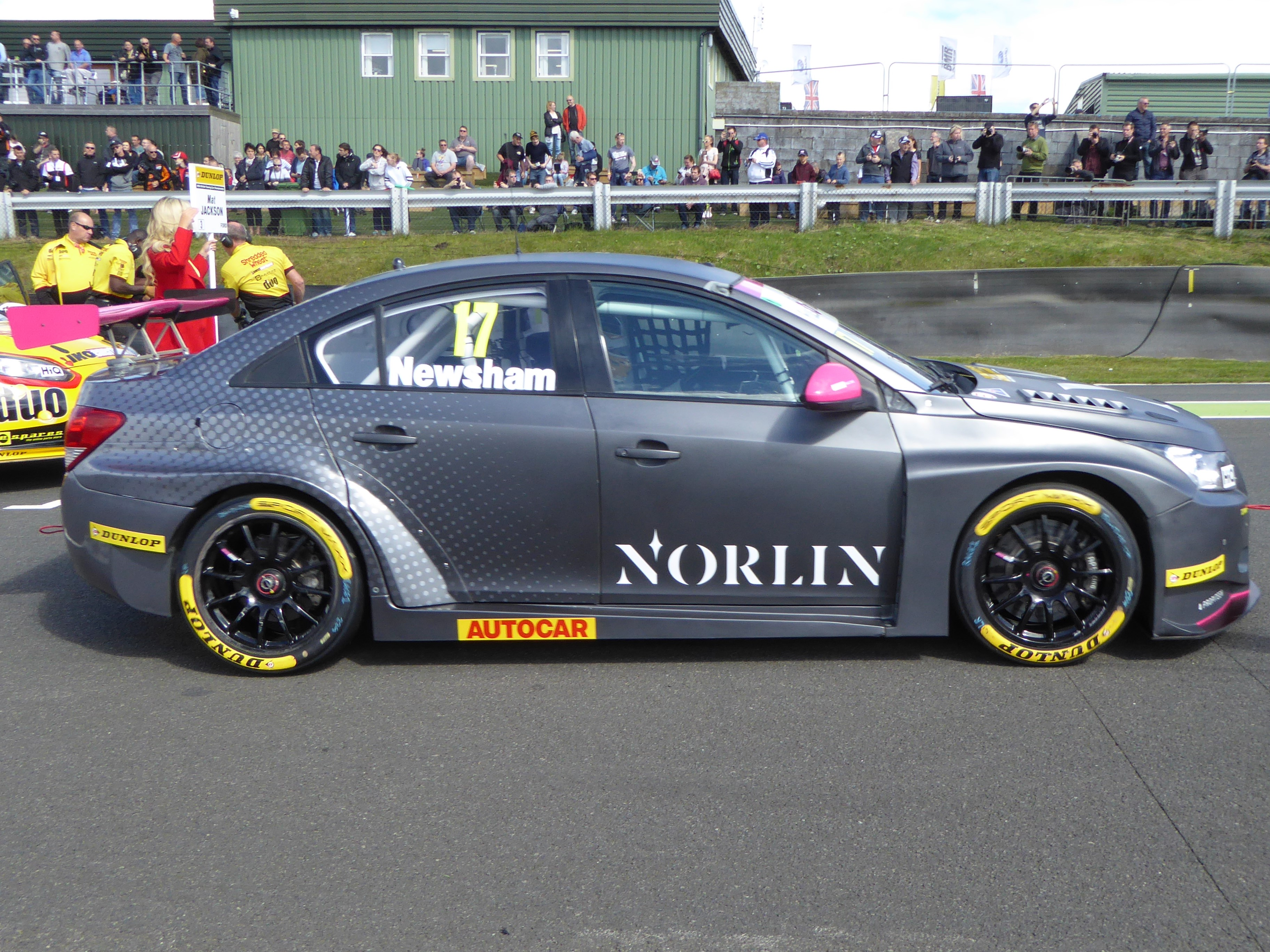
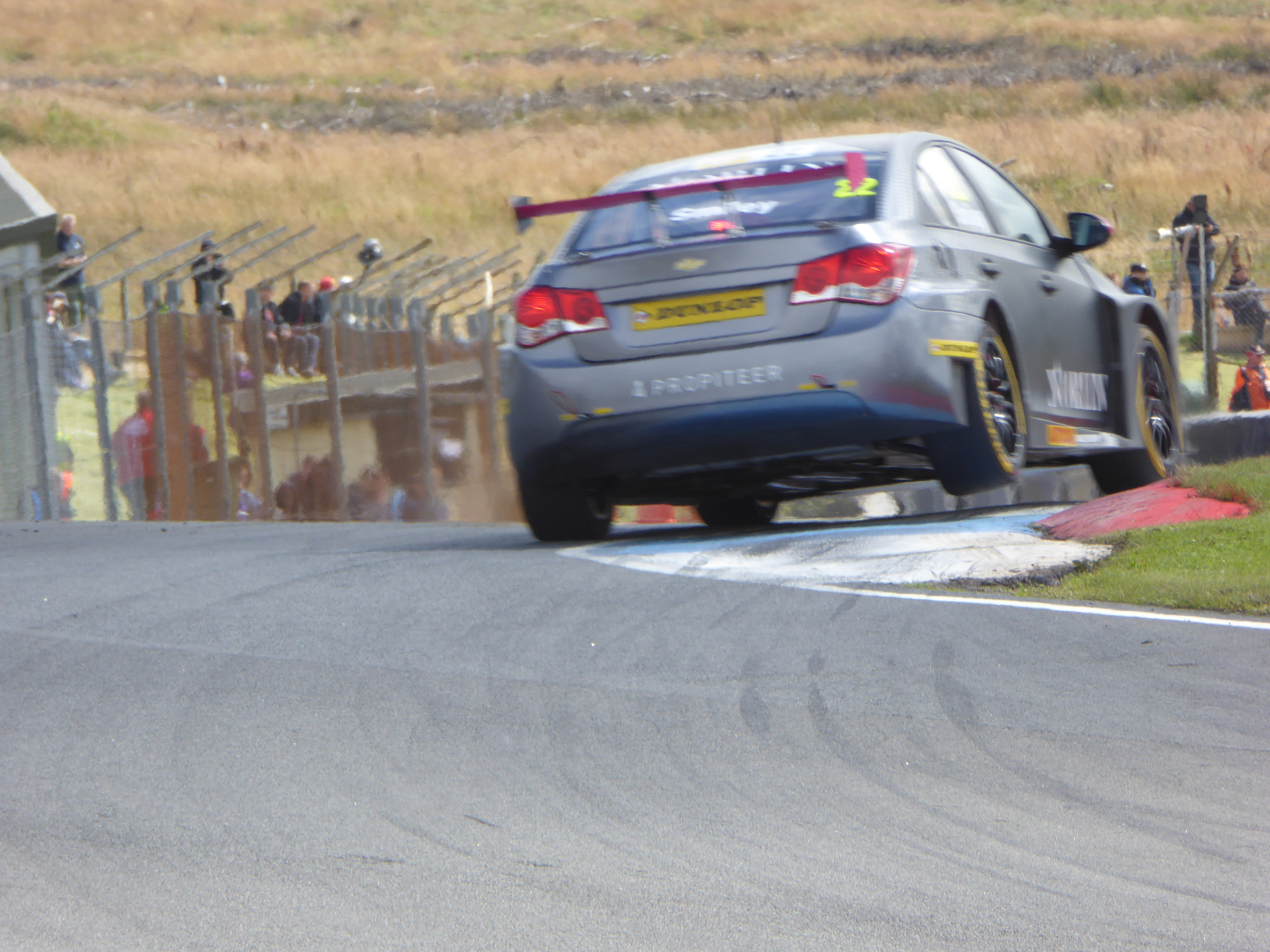
The team's drivers, Dave Newsham and Chris Smiley, at the Knockhill round of the 2017 British Touring Car Championship.

In December 2016, the team announced plans to return to the grid with Chris Smiley and Dave Newsham announced as the drivers in a pair of Chevrolet Cruzes purchased back from Power Maxed Racing

=== Honda Civic Type R (FK2) (2018) ===
BTC Norlin switched to ex-Dynamics Honda Civics in 2018 as the works team switched to the new shape car. Daniel Lloyd took the team's first win at Croft then followed up by Chris Smiley at Rockingham, making him the last ever winner at the infamous oval track. It was at the end of the 2018 season that Steve Dudman acquired the outfit, initially acting as a joint Team Principal alongside Bert Taylor.

=== Honda Civic Type R (FK8) (2019-) ===
For the 2019 season, without title sponsor Norlin, BTC will run two Honda Civic Type R (FK8) cars. Chris Smiley has re-signed for another season and Josh Cook joins as his new teammate from Power Maxed Racing, while the team have also moved to a new facility in Brackley, Northamptonshire. The team started the Kwik Fit BTCC successfully, with Josh Cook leading the championship after the first race weekend at Brands Hatch, and ended the season in 4th position overall and as Independent runners-up in the Team and Driver standings.

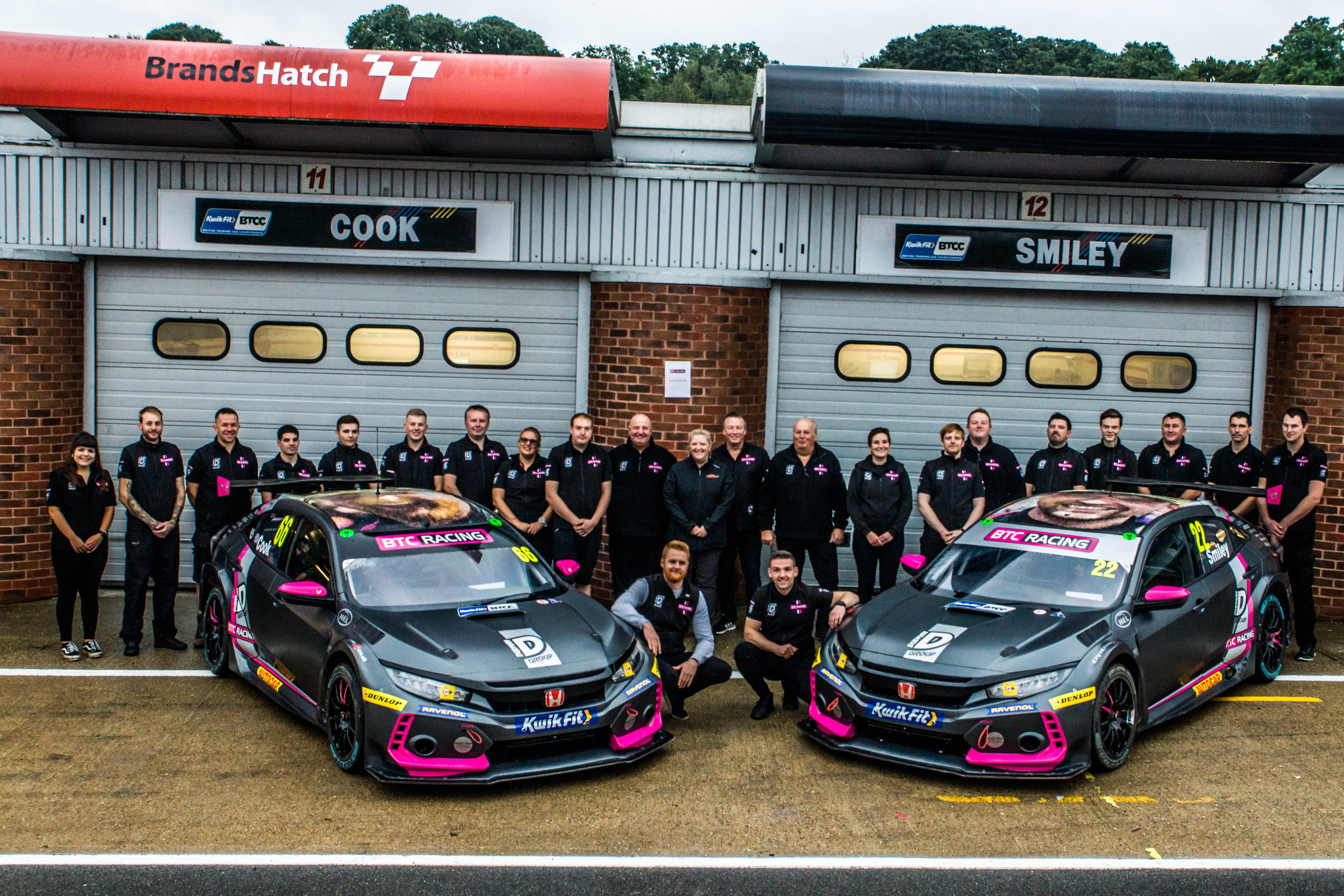
The 2019 BTC Racing team at Brands Hatch

2020 saw the squad expand to a three-car outfit- continuing with the successful Honda Civic Type R FK8s. Josh Cook returned to the team for his second consecutive season, with 14-times BTCC race winner and former WTCC and BTCC Independent Champion Tom Chilton moving across from Motorbase Performance. BTCC rookie Michael Crees completed the new line-up competing for the Jack Sears Trophy under The Clever Baggers with BTC Racing banner.

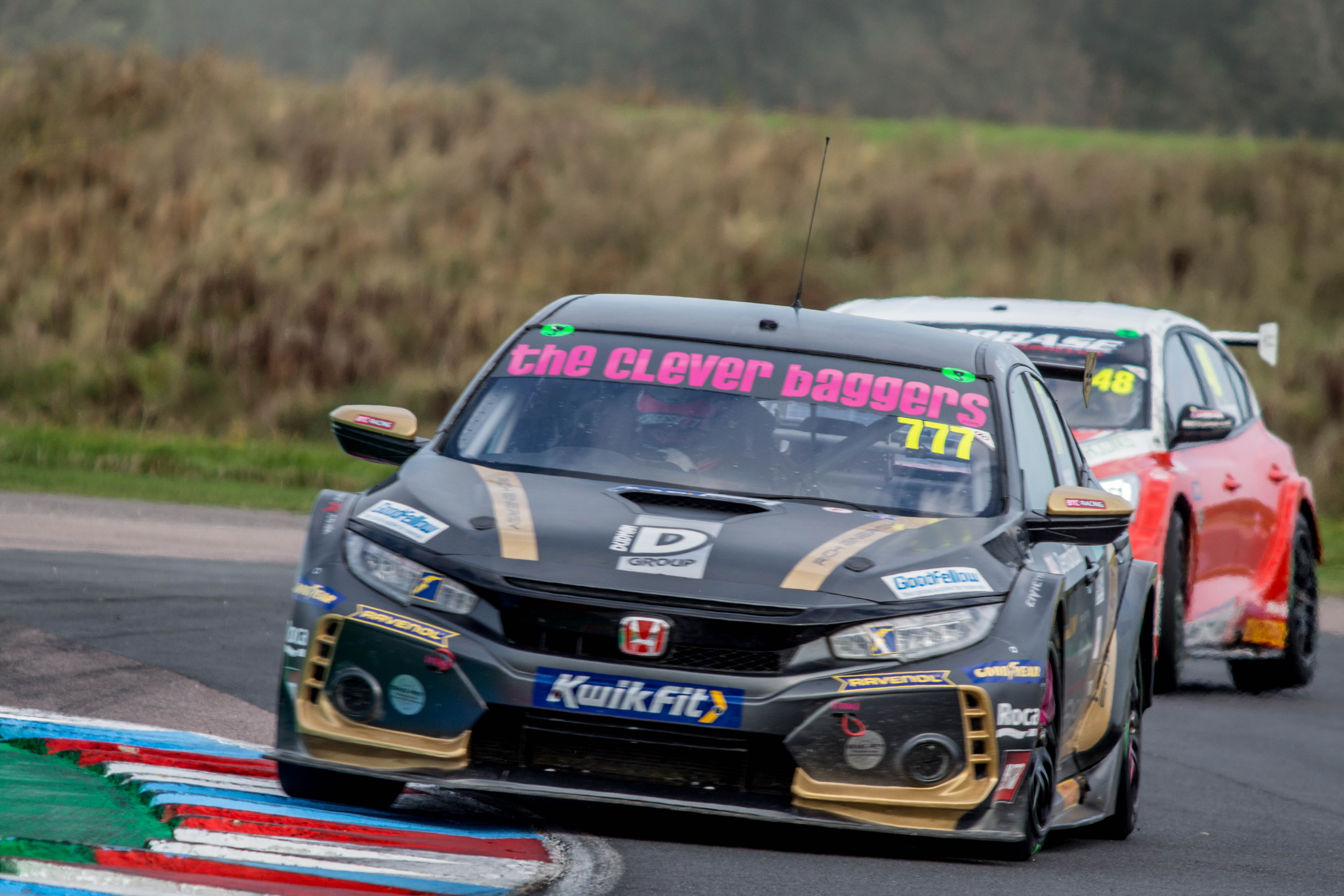
Michael Crees in The Clever Baggers with BTC Racing Honda Civic Type R
