= Restart Racing =

British motor racing team

- Founded: 2022
- Founder(s): Pete Jones; Ben Taylor; Chris Smiley
- Former names: Chris Smiley Racing (2023-2024)
- Base: Carrickfergus, Northern Ireland, United Kingdom / Snetterton, Norfolk / Colchester, Essex
- Team principal(s): Ben Taylor
- Current series: British Touring Car Championship
- Former series: TCR UK Championship
- Current drivers: British Touring Car Championship; 22. (United Kingdom) Chris Smiley; 123. (United Kingdom) Daniel Lloyd; Mini Challenge UK; 33. (United Kingdom) Max Edmundson
- Noted drivers: (United Kingdom) James Dorlin (United Kingdom) Scott Sumpton
- Teams' Championships: British Touring Car Championship; Independents'; 2025
- Drivers' Championships: TCR UK Championship; 2022 - Chris Smiley; British Touring Car Championship; Independents'; 2025 - Daniel Lloyd

Restart Racing is a British racing team which currently competes in the British Touring Car Championship. The team won the 2022 TCR UK Touring Car Championship with Chris Smiley.

The team planned to enter Scott Sumpton into the 2024 TCR Europe Touring Car Series, but later withdrew to fully focus on their BTCC efforts. The team originally was only based in Carrickfergus, Northern Ireland but has expanded to Snetterton, Norfolk and Colchester, Essex.

== History ==
=== British Touring Car Championship ===
==== 2024 ====
Ahead of the 2024 British Touring Car Championship season, the team announced their movement of the team to the BTCC, departing the TCR UK Touring Car Championship. The team retained Chris Smiley and Scott Sumpton from their TCR UK outfit going into the season. The personnel of the team was similar to the last team Smiley co-owned, being BTC Norlin Racing. The team opted to run 2 Cupra Leóns with the TOCA/M-Sport engine in the cars. Smiley's former engineer Ben Taylor was appointed team principal.

==== 2025 ====
The team signed an alliance with EXCELR8 Motorsport, which included 2 Hyundai i30s. Chris Smiley was kept for a second consecutive campaign, whilst former EXCELR8 Motorsport driver Daniel Lloyd was brought in, replacing Scott Sumpton. The team would rise up the pecking order, fighting for wins at Snetterton and Silverstone. Daniel Lloyd brought the team's first BTCC win at the Silverstone round in race 1, fending off champions such as Gordon Shedden and Jake Hill. The team would win the Independents' constructors as Lloyd brought the team the Independent Drivers' Championship win as Power Maxed Racing struggled after their fire in August.

==== 2026 ====
Daniel Lloyd would step away from his seat at the team after budget issues and his intent to expand his career in driver management. Partnering Smiley would be former Toyota Gazoo Racing UK with IAA driver James Dorlin, who dropped out after Knockhill in 2025 after being replaced by Josh Cook. The team would also gain a big sponsorship from Silverstone's Escapade, revealing their car at the Northamptonshire venue. Lloyd would later return to the BTCC after the Knockhill round, replacing James Dorlin.

==== Mini Challenge UK ====
In July 2025, Restart Racing expanded to the Mini Challenge UK by backing Max Edmundson.

== Racing results ==
=== British Touring Car Championship ===
Year	Name	Car	No.	Driver	Races	Wins	Poles	F/Laps	Podiums	Points	DC	CC Pts	CC
2024	Restart Racing	Cupra León	29	(United Kingdom) Scott Sumpton	30	0	0	0	0	20	21st	181	8th
2024	Restart Racing	Cupra León	222	(United Kingdom) Chris Smiley	30	0	0	0	0	70	17th	181	8th
2025	Restart Racing	Hyundai i30 Fastback N Performance	22	(United Kingdom) Chris Smiley	30	0	0	1	1	140	14th	386	4th
2025	Restart Racing	Hyundai i30 Fastback N Performance	123	(United Kingdom) Daniel Lloyd	30	1	0	1	1	128	15th	386	4th
2026	Restart Racing	Hyundai i30 Fastback N Performance	22	(United Kingdom) Chris Smiley	30	0	0	0	0	127	16th	272	8th
2026	Restart Racing	Hyundai i30 Fastback N Performance	123	(United Kingdom) Daniel Lloyd	10	0	0	0	0	39	20th	272	8th
2026	Restart Racing	Hyundai i30 Fastback N Performance	132	(United Kingdom) James Dorlin	18	0	0	0	0	69	18th	272	8th

*– Season in progress.
