= 2024 British Touring Car Championship =

67th season of the British Touring Car Championship

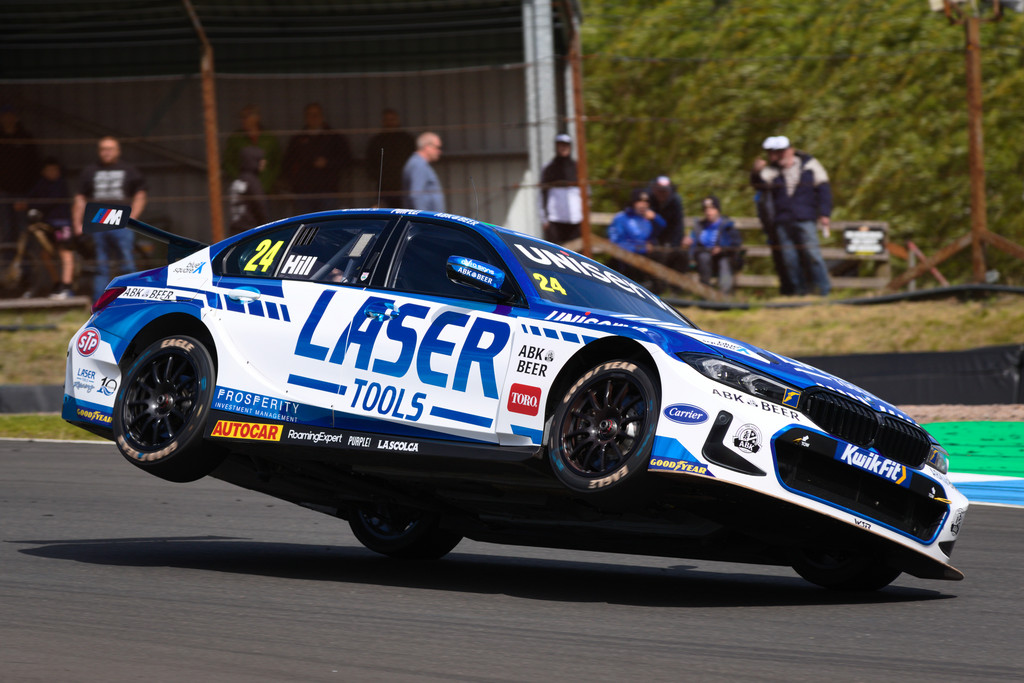
Jake Hill (left) won the drivers title, BMW won the Manufacturers title, NAPA Racing UK (right) won the Teams title

The 2024 Kwik Fit British Touring Car Championship (commonly abbreviated as BTCC) was a motor racing championship for production-based touring cars held across England and Scotland. The championship features a mix of professional motor racing teams and privately funded amateur drivers competing in highly modified versions of family cars which are sold to the general public and conform to the technical regulations for the championship. The 2024 season is the 67th British Touring Car Championship season, the 14th season for cars conforming to the Next Generation Touring Car (NGTC) technical specification and the final season using hybrid technology. Jake Hill outscored Tom Ingram by eight points to score his first BTCC Title.

== Teams and drivers ==
Team	Car	Engine	No.	Drivers	Rounds
Constructor Entries
NAPA Racing UK	Ford Focus ST	Ford/Mountune	1	(United Kingdom) Ashley Sutton	All
NAPA Racing UK	Ford Focus ST	Ford/Mountune	27	(United Kingdom) Dan Cammish	All
NAPA Racing UK	Ford Focus ST	Ford/Mountune	32	(United Kingdom) Daniel Rowbottom	All
NAPA Racing UK	Ford Focus ST	Ford/Mountune	77	(United Kingdom) Sam Osborne	All
Team Bristol Street Motors	Hyundai i30 Fastback N Performance	Hyundai/Swindon	3	(United Kingdom) Tom Chilton	All
Team Bristol Street Motors	Hyundai i30 Fastback N Performance	Hyundai/Swindon	14	(United Kingdom) Ronan Pearson	1–7
Team Bristol Street Motors	Hyundai i30 Fastback N Performance	Hyundai/Swindon	22	(United Kingdom) Nick Halstead	All
Team Bristol Street Motors	Hyundai i30 Fastback N Performance	Hyundai/Swindon	45	(United Kingdom) Dan Zelos	8–10
Team Bristol Street Motors	Hyundai i30 Fastback N Performance	Hyundai/Swindon	80	(United Kingdom) Tom Ingram	All
Toyota Gazoo Racing UK	Toyota Corolla GR Sport	Toyota/Neil Brown	11	(United Kingdom) Andrew Watson	All
Toyota Gazoo Racing UK	Toyota Corolla GR Sport	Toyota/Neil Brown	12	(United Kingdom) Rob Huff	All
LKQ Euro Car Parts with SYNETIQ	Toyota Corolla GR Sport	Toyota/Neil Brown	16	(United Kingdom) Aiden Moffat	All
LKQ Euro Car Parts with SYNETIQ	Toyota Corolla GR Sport	Toyota/Neil Brown	66	(United Kingdom) Josh Cook	All
Zeus Cloud Racing with WSR	BMW 330e M Sport	BMW/Neil Brown	19	(United Kingdom) Bobby Thompson	3
Team BMW	BMW 330e M Sport	BMW/Neil Brown	20	(United Kingdom) Colin Turkington	All
Team BMW	BMW 330e M Sport	BMW/Neil Brown	33	(United Kingdom) Adam Morgan	All
Laser Tools Racing with MB Motorsport	BMW 330e M Sport	BMW/Neil Brown	24	(United Kingdom) Jake Hill	All
Independent Entries
Duckhams Racing With Bartercard	Cupra León	TOCA/M-Sport	18	(Philippines) Daryl De Leon	All
Restart Racing	Cupra León	TOCA/M-Sport	29	(United Kingdom) Scott Sumpton	All
Restart Racing	Cupra León	TOCA/M-Sport	222	(United Kingdom) Chris Smiley	All
Evans Halshaw Power Maxed Racing	Vauxhall Astra	TOCA/M-Sport	40	(Republic of Ireland) Árón Taylor-Smith	All
Evans Halshaw Power Maxed Racing	Vauxhall Astra	TOCA/M-Sport	88	(United Kingdom) Mikey Doble	All

Key
Eligible for the Jack Sears Trophy for drivers yet to record an overall podium
finish or Jack Sears Trophy championship at the start of the season.

Entering/re-entering BTCC

- 2022 TCR UK Touring Car Championship winner Chris Smiley returned to the series after having last raced in 2021 for Ginsters Excelr8 with TradePriceCars.com, driving for Restart Racing in their debut year
- Scott Sumpton made his BTCC debut with Restart Racing in the Cupra Leon
- Un-Limited Motorsport joined the BTCC from the ashes of Team HARD, and raced as Duckhams Racing With Bartercard for the majority of the season.

Changed teams

- Josh Cook and Aiden Moffat moved from One Motorsport with Starline Racing to LKQ Euro Car Parts with SYNETIQ
- Andrew Watson moved from CarStore Power Maxed Racing to Toyota Gazoo Racing UK
- Rob Huff moved from Go-Fix with Autoaid Breakdown to Toyota Gazoo Racing UK
- Bobby Thompson moved from Autobrite Direct with Millers Oils and Go-Fix with Autoaid Breakdown to Zeus Cloud Racing with WSR for the remainder of this season to replace Stephen Jelley.

Leaving BTCC

- Rory Butcher took a sabbatical this year to focus on his family and other projects
- Stephen Jelley, George Gamble, Jack Butel and Daniel Lloyd departed the BTCC for the Porsche Carrera Cup GB.
- Ricky Collard departed the BTCC for British GT.
- Jade Edwards left the BTCC after failing to secure financial backing for her seat.

Team changes

- Restart Racing made their BTCC debut with two Cupra Leons for Chris Smiley and Scott Sumpton
- Team Dynamics returned to the series as a technical partner to EXCELR8 in a multi-year deal.
- One Motorsport took a sabbatical from the series with the aim to focus on the 2025 season.
- Motorbase Performance changed its name in the off-season to Alliance Racing.

Mid-Season Changes

- Bobby Thompson Joined Zeus Cloud Racing with WSR for the Snetterton round.
- Ronan Pearson parted ways with Team Bristol Street Motors after the Knockhill round. Series debutant Dan Zelos was later named as his replacement.

== Race calendar ==
The 2024 calendar was announced on 15 May 2023.

2024 BTCC Race Locations

Round		Circuit	Date
1	R1	Donington Park (National Circuit, Leicestershire)	27–28 April
1	R2	Donington Park (National Circuit, Leicestershire)	27–28 April
1	R3	Donington Park (National Circuit, Leicestershire)	27–28 April
2	R4	Brands Hatch (Indy Circuit, Kent)	11–12 May
2	R5	Brands Hatch (Indy Circuit, Kent)	11–12 May
2	R6	Brands Hatch (Indy Circuit, Kent)	11–12 May
3	R7	Snetterton Motor Racing Circuit (300 Circuit, Norfolk)	25–26 May
3	R8	Snetterton Motor Racing Circuit (300 Circuit, Norfolk)	25–26 May
3	R9	Snetterton Motor Racing Circuit (300 Circuit, Norfolk)	25–26 May
4	R10	Thruxton Circuit (Hampshire)	8–9 June
4	R11	Thruxton Circuit (Hampshire)	8–9 June
4	R12	Thruxton Circuit (Hampshire)	8–9 June
5	R13	Oulton Park (Island Circuit, Cheshire)	22–23 June
5	R14	Oulton Park (Island Circuit, Cheshire)	22–23 June
5	R15	Oulton Park (Island Circuit, Cheshire)	22–23 June
6	R16	Croft Circuit (North Yorkshire)	27–28 July
6	R17	Croft Circuit (North Yorkshire)	27–28 July
6	R18	Croft Circuit (North Yorkshire)	27–28 July
7	R19	Knockhill Racing Circuit (Fife)	10–11 August
7	R20	Knockhill Racing Circuit (Fife)	10–11 August
7	R21	Knockhill Racing Circuit (Fife)	10–11 August
8	R22	Donington Park (Grand Prix Circuit, Leicestershire)	24–25 August
8	R23	Donington Park (Grand Prix Circuit, Leicestershire)	24–25 August
8	R24	Donington Park (Grand Prix Circuit, Leicestershire)	24–25 August
9	R25	Silverstone Circuit (National Circuit, Northamptonshire)	21–22 September
9	R26	Silverstone Circuit (National Circuit, Northamptonshire)	21–22 September
9	R27	Silverstone Circuit (National Circuit, Northamptonshire)	21–22 September
10	R28	Brands Hatch (Grand Prix Circuit, Kent)	5–6 October
10	R29	Brands Hatch (Grand Prix Circuit, Kent)	5–6 October
10	R30	Brands Hatch (Grand Prix Circuit, Kent)	5–6 October

== Results and standings ==
Round		Circuit	Pole position	Fastest lap	Winning Driver	Winning team	Winning independent	Winning JST
1	R1	Donington Park National	(United Kingdom) Tom Ingram	(United Kingdom) Tom Ingram	(United Kingdom) Tom Ingram	(United Kingdom) Team Bristol Street Motors	(Republic of Ireland) Árón Taylor-Smith	(United Kingdom) Ronan Pearson
1	R2	Donington Park National		(United Kingdom) Ronan Pearson	(United Kingdom) Tom Ingram	(United Kingdom) Team Bristol Street Motors	(Republic of Ireland) Árón Taylor-Smith	(United Kingdom) Mikey Doble
1	R3	Donington Park National		(United Kingdom) Tom Ingram	(United Kingdom) Aiden Moffat	(United Kingdom) LKQ Euro Car Parts with SYNETIQ	(United Kingdom) Mikey Doble	(United Kingdom) Mikey Doble
2	R1	Brands Hatch Indy	(United Kingdom) Colin Turkington	(United Kingdom) Colin Turkington	(United Kingdom) Colin Turkington	(United Kingdom) Team BMW	(Republic of Ireland) Árón Taylor-Smith	(United Kingdom) Mikey Doble
2	R2	Brands Hatch Indy		(United Kingdom) Ashley Sutton	(United Kingdom) Colin Turkington	(United Kingdom) Team BMW	(United Kingdom) Mikey Doble	(United Kingdom) Mikey Doble
2	R3	Brands Hatch Indy		(United Kingdom) Tom Ingram	(United Kingdom) Ronan Pearson	(United Kingdom) Team Bristol Street Motors	(Republic of Ireland) Árón Taylor-Smith	(United Kingdom) Ronan Pearson
3	R1	Snetterton Motor Racing Circuit	(United Kingdom) Jake Hill	(United Kingdom) Tom Ingram	(United Kingdom) Jake Hill	(United Kingdom) Laser Tools Racing with MB Motorsport	(Republic of Ireland) Árón Taylor-Smith	(United Kingdom) Ronan Pearson
3	R2	Snetterton Motor Racing Circuit		(Republic of Ireland) Árón Taylor-Smith	(United Kingdom) Jake Hill	(United Kingdom) Laser Tools Racing with MB Motorsport	(United Kingdom) Mikey Doble	(United Kingdom) Mikey Doble
3	R3	Snetterton Motor Racing Circuit		(United Kingdom) Tom Ingram	(United Kingdom) Rob Huff	(United Kingdom) Toyota Gazoo Racing UK	(United Kingdom) Mikey Doble	(United Kingdom) Mikey Doble
4	R1	Thruxton Circuit	(United Kingdom) Tom Ingram	(United Kingdom) Jake Hill	(United Kingdom) Jake Hill	(United Kingdom) Laser Tools Racing with MB Motorsport	(Republic of Ireland) Árón Taylor-Smith	(United Kingdom) Mikey Doble
4	R2	Thruxton Circuit		(United Kingdom) Dan Cammish	(United Kingdom) Jake Hill	(United Kingdom) Laser Tools Racing with MB Motorsport	(Republic of Ireland) Árón Taylor-Smith	(United Kingdom) Ronan Pearson
4	R3	Thruxton Circuit		(United Kingdom) Ashley Sutton	(United Kingdom) Ashley Sutton	(United Kingdom) NAPA Racing UK	(Republic of Ireland) Árón Taylor-Smith	(United Kingdom) Ronan Pearson
5	R1	Oulton Park	(United Kingdom) Tom Ingram	(United Kingdom) Dan Cammish	(United Kingdom) Tom Ingram	(United Kingdom) Team Bristol Street Motors	(Republic of Ireland) Árón Taylor-Smith	(United Kingdom) Mikey Doble
5	R2	Oulton Park		(United Kingdom) Josh Cook	(United Kingdom) Josh Cook	(United Kingdom) LKQ Euro Car Parts with SYNETIQ	(Republic of Ireland) Árón Taylor-Smith	(United Kingdom) Mikey Doble
5	R3	Oulton Park		(United Kingdom) Ashley Sutton	(United Kingdom) Jake Hill	(United Kingdom) Laser Tools Racing with MB Motorsport	(United Kingdom) Mikey Doble	(United Kingdom) Mikey Doble
6	R1	Croft Circuit	(United Kingdom) Colin Turkington	(United Kingdom) Colin Turkington	(United Kingdom) Colin Turkington	(United Kingdom) Team BMW	(Republic of Ireland) Árón Taylor-Smith	(United Kingdom) Mikey Doble
6	R2	Croft Circuit		(United Kingdom) Josh Cook	(United Kingdom) Josh Cook	(United Kingdom) LKQ Euro Car Parts with SYNETIQ	(Republic of Ireland) Árón Taylor-Smith	(United Kingdom) Mikey Doble
6	R3	Croft Circuit		(United Kingdom) Dan Cammish	(United Kingdom) Tom Chilton	(United Kingdom) Team Bristol Street Motors	(United Kingdom) Chris Smiley	(United Kingdom) Ronan Pearson
7	R1	Knockhill Racing Circuit	(United Kingdom) Colin Turkington	(United Kingdom) Colin Turkington	(United Kingdom) Colin Turkington	(United Kingdom) Team BMW	(Republic of Ireland) Árón Taylor-Smith	(United Kingdom) Mikey Doble
7	R2	Knockhill Racing Circuit		(United Kingdom) Daniel Rowbottom	(United Kingdom) Jake Hill	(United Kingdom) Laser Tools Racing with MB Motorsport	(Republic of Ireland) Árón Taylor-Smith	(United Kingdom) Sam Osborne
7	R3	Knockhill Racing Circuit		(United Kingdom) Tom Ingram	(United Kingdom) Rob Huff	(United Kingdom) Toyota Gazoo Racing UK	(United Kingdom) Scott Sumpton	(United Kingdom) Ronan Pearson
8	R1	Donington Park GP	(United Kingdom) Josh Cook	(United Kingdom) Colin Turkington	(United Kingdom) Colin Turkington	(United Kingdom) Team BMW	(Republic of Ireland) Árón Taylor-Smith	(United Kingdom) Sam Osborne
8	R2	Donington Park GP		(United Kingdom) Colin Turkington	(United Kingdom) Ashley Sutton	(United Kingdom) NAPA Racing UK	(Republic of Ireland) Árón Taylor-Smith	(United Kingdom) Mikey Doble
8	R3	Donington Park GP		(United Kingdom) Tom Ingram	(United Kingdom) Dan Cammish	(United Kingdom) NAPA Racing UK	(Republic of Ireland) Árón Taylor-Smith	(United Kingdom) Mikey Doble
9	R1	Silverstone Circuit	(United Kingdom) Tom Ingram	(United Kingdom) Ashley Sutton	(United Kingdom) Tom Ingram	(United Kingdom) Team Bristol Street Motors	(United Kingdom) Árón Taylor-Smith	(United Kingdom) Sam Osborne
9	R2	Silverstone Circuit		(United Kingdom) Ashley Sutton	(United Kingdom) Jake Hill	(United Kingdom) Laser Tools Racing with MB Motorsport	(United Kingdom) Chris Smiley	(United Kingdom) Dan Zelos
9	R3	Silverstone Circuit		(United Kingdom) Tom Ingram	(United Kingdom) Tom Ingram	(United Kingdom) Team Bristol Street Motors	(Republic of Ireland) Árón Taylor-Smith	(United Kingdom) Dan Zelos
10	R1	Brands Hatch GP	(United Kingdom) Colin Turkington	(United Kingdom) Tom Ingram	(United Kingdom) Jake Hill	(United Kingdom) Laser Tools Racing with MB Motorsport	(United Kingdom) Mikey Doble	(United Kingdom) Mikey Doble
10	R2	Brands Hatch GP		(United Kingdom) Tom Ingram	(United Kingdom) Tom Ingram	(United Kingdom) Team Bristol Street Motors	(Republic of Ireland) Árón Taylor-Smith	(United Kingdom) Sam Osborne
10	R3	Brands Hatch GP		(United Kingdom) Ashley Sutton	(United Kingdom) Ashley Sutton	(United Kingdom) NAPA Racing UK	(United Kingdom) Mikey Doble	(United Kingdom) Sam Osborne

=== Drivers' Championship ===
Points system
1st	2nd	3rd	4th	5th	6th	7th	8th	9th	10th	11th	12th	13th	14th	15th	R1 PP	Fastest lap	Lead laps in race
20	17	15	13	11	10	9	8	7	6	5	4	3	2	1	1	1	1

Notes

- The point for leading laps in race is one point, regardless of how many laps led.

Pos.	Driver	DPN			BHI			SNE			THR			OUL			CRO			KNO			DPGP			SIL			BHGP			Pts
1	(United Kingdom) Jake Hill	3	3^{L}	5	4	Ret	12	1^{PL}	1^{L}	9^{L}	1^{FL}	1^{L}	5	5	3	1^{L}	6	16	5	5	1^{L}	5	3	3	5	2	1^{L}	5	1^{L}	2^{L}	2	421
2	(United Kingdom) Tom Ingram	1^{PFL}	1^{L}	4^{F}	7	2	18^{F}	6^{F}	16	4^{F}	4^{P}	3^{L}	3	1^{PL}	2	4	2	4^{L}	3	Ret	10	2^{FL}	5	Ret	2^{F}	1^{PL}	4^{L}	1^{FL}	3^{F}	1^{FL}	6	413
3	(United Kingdom) Ashley Sutton	2	2	3	3	3^{F}	3	3	20	5	3	5	1^{FL}	2	16	18^{F}	4	5	4	6	5	4	2	1^{L}	NC	4^{F}	12^{F}	2	Ret	5	1^{FL}	365
4	(United Kingdom) Colin Turkington	4	5	2	1^{PFL}	1^{L}	8	8	15	7	9	7	7	20	7	15	1^{PFL}	9	14	1^{PFL}	3^{L}	9	1^{FL}	2^{F}	7	5	2	Ret	2^{PL}	3	5	346
5	(United Kingdom) Dan Cammish	8	6	10	18	7	5	4	2	13	2	2^{F}	2	3^{F}	4	5	3	6	2^{F}	9	7	8	8	11	1^{L}	3	5	4	5	4	4	346
6	(United Kingdom) Josh Cook	6	4	9	2	16	11	14	3	3	5	6	6	8	1^{FL}	8	8	1^{FL}	7	2	4	Ret	4^{P}	4	4	6	3	3	Ret	7	3^{L}	327
7	(Republic of Ireland) Árón Taylor-Smith	7	11	14	10	10	4	12	12^{F}	15	10	9	8	7	5	3	5	7	13	4	11	12	9	8	3	12	9	9	6	6	12	224
8	(United Kingdom) Adam Morgan	14	7	7^{L}	15	4	10	7	18	11	8	8	4^{L}	4	17	7	13	17	9	3	6	Ret	6	5	8	11	7	6	Ret	DNS	10	201
9	(United Kingdom) Rob Huff	18	9	6^{L}	11	Ret	9	9	14	1^{L}	12	10	9	10	11	12	7	2^{L}	6	8	12	1^{L}	7	7	15	17	11	7	Ret	16	Ret	195
10	(United Kingdom) Tom Chilton	11	Ret	11	6	6	2	15	5	6	6	11	Ret	6	Ret	Ret	9	8	1^{L}	14	9	3	16	12	16	7	Ret	12	9	9	14	187
11	(United Kingdom) Daniel Rowbottom	Ret	10	8	5	5	6	10	17	19	7	4	17	15	9	6	10	3	8	7	2^{F}	6	14	6	13	Ret	13	15	8	Ret	15	186
12	(United Kingdom) Mikey Doble	12	13	13	13	9	15	13	4	10	11	14	11	11	6	2^{L}	11	11	15	10	18	DNS	15	9	6	Ret	14	11	4	NC	11	148
13	(United Kingdom) Aiden Moffat	9	8	1^{L}	9	8	Ret	21	8	2	14	12	15	9	Ret	10	14	10	Ret	16	8	7	11	Ret	Ret	14	17	Ret	Ret	8	9	138
14	(United Kingdom) Andrew Watson	10	12	12	8	15	7	5	6	16	13	Ret	12	14	10	14	12	12	NC	11	14	NC	Ret	14	12	9	15	14	10	11	8	120
15	(United Kingdom) Sam Osborne	Ret	DNS	15	12	12	16	16	9	14	16	15	13	16	15	Ret	19	13	12	12	15	15	10	10	10	8	10	10	12	10	7	93
16	(United Kingdom) Ronan Pearson	5	17^{F}	Ret	19	11	1^{L}	11	19	18	15	13	10	12	13	11	16	Ret	10	17	Ret	10										77
17	(United Kingdom) Chris Smiley	15	14	Ret	14	17	13	18	13	Ret	17	16	14	13	8	9	15	Ret	11	13	13	13	13	15	Ret	13	6	16	13	12	16	70
18	(Philippines) Daryl DeLeon	13	15	Ret	NC	14	19	17	10	12	18	17	NC	18	12	13	18	14	17	15	16	DSQ	17	17	9	18	19	13	7	13	17	48
19	(United Kingdom) Dan Zelos																						12	13	11	10	8	8	11	14	13	44
20	(United Kingdom) Bobby Thompson							2	7	8																						34
21	(United Kingdom) Scott Sumpton	17	Ret	16	16	Ret	14	19	11	17	Ret	18	16	19	14	16	17	15	16	18	19	11	18	16	14	15	16	17	15	15	18	20
22	(United Kingdom) Nick Halstead	16	16	17	17	13	17	20	WD	WD	19	19	Ret	17	18	17	20	Ret	18	19	17	14	19	18	17	16	18	18	14	17	19	7
Pos.	Driver	DPN			BHI			SNE			THR			OUL			CRO			KNO			DPGP			SIL			BHGP			Pts

Colour	Result
Gold	Winner
Silver	2nd place
Bronze	3rd place
Green	Points finish
Blue	Non-points finish
Blue	Non-classified finish (NC)
Purple	Retired (Ret)
Red	Did not qualify (DNQ)
Red	Did not pre-qualify (DNPQ)
Black	Disqualified (DSQ)
White	Did not start (DNS)
White	Withdrew (WD)
White	Race cancelled (C)
Blank	Did not participate (DNP)
Blank	Excluded (EX)

^{P} – Pole position
^{F} – Fastest lap
^{L} – Lead race lap

=== Manufacturers'/Constructors' Championship ===
Pos.	Manufacturer	Constructor	Points
1	BMW	West Surrey Racing	818
2	Ford	Alliance Racing	795
3	Hyundai	EXCELR8 Motorsport	694
4	Toyota	Speedworks Motorsport	644

=== Teams' Championship ===
Pos.	Team	Points
1	NAPA Racing UK	724
2	Team Bristol Street Motors	609
3	Team BMW	560
4	LKQ Euro Car Parts with SYNETIQ	497
5	Evans Halshaw Power Maxed Racing	427
6	Laser Tools Racing with MB Motorsport	412
7	Toyota Gazoo Racing UK	367
8	Restart Racing	181
9	Duckhams Racing with Bartercard	85
10	Zeus Cloud Racing with WSR	34

=== Independent Drivers' Championship ===
Pos.	Team	Points
1	(Republic of Ireland) Árón Taylor-Smith	564
2	(United Kingdom) Mikey Doble	446
3	(United Kingdom) Chris Smiley	396
4	(Philippines) Daryl DeLeon	354
5	(United Kingdom) Scott Sumpton	342

=== Independent Teams' Championship ===
Pos.	Team	Points
1	Evans Halshaw Power Maxed Racing	724
2	Restart Racing	609
3	Duckhams Racing with Bartercard	560

=== Jack Sears Trophy ===
Pos.	Team	Points
1	(United Kingdom) Mikey Doble	490
2	(United Kingdom) Sam Osborne	437
3	(Philippines) Daryl DeLeon	360
4	(United Kingdom) Scott Sumpton	343
5	(United Kingdom) Ronan Pearson	299*
6	(United Kingdom) Nick Halstead	299
7	(United Kingdom) Dan Zelos	147

*Ronan Pearson placed above Nick Halstead on Jack Sears win countback.
