= Scott Sumpton =

British racing driver (born 2004)

- Sumpton at Thruxton Circuit in 2024
- Nationality: (United Kingdom) British
- Born: Scott George Sumpton; 29 November 2004 (age 21) Essex, England

British Touring Car Championship
- Years active: 2024
- Starts: 30
- Wins: 0
- Podiums: 0
- Poles: 0
- Fastest laps: 0
- Best finish: 21st in 2024

Scott George Sumpton (born 29 November 2004) is a British racing driver who last competed in the 2024 British Touring Car Championship for Restart Racing.

== Career ==
=== Move to car racing (2020–2021) ===
Sumpton moved up to the Junior Saloon Car Championship in 2020 with the backing of Tony Gilham's Team HARD. He amassed no podiums and finished 23rd in the standings.

For 2021, Sumpton switched to Team HARD's satellite team, Chandler Motorsport. He moved over to Jeakins Race Preparation for the final 3 rounds.

=== TCR switch (2022–2023) ===
2022 saw Sumpton switched to the TCR UK Touring Car Championship, joining home team Essex & Kent Motorsport. For the 3rd year, no podiums, wins, fastest laps or podiums amassed on his way to 21st in the standings. Another year in 2023, this time with reigning champions Restart Racing, he moved into P12 in the standings, along with one fastest lap. A part-time campaign in the TCR Spain Touring Car Championship saw him place 7th in the championship.

=== British Touring Car Championship move (2024) ===
Sumpton jumped up to the British Touring Car Championship in 2024, with series debutant and former TCR UK team Restart Racing. He ended up only placed ahead of Nick Halstead, and placing behind part-time drivers Dan Zelos and Bobby Thompson on his way to 21st in the championship. He did not return for 2025 after a failed Vortx Racing team, opting to sit on the sidelines.

== Racing record ==
=== Career summary ===
Season	Series	Team	Races	Wins	Poles	F/Laps	Podiums	Points	Position
2020	Junior Saloon Car Championship	Team HARD.	13	0	0	0	0	53	23rd
2021	Junior Saloon Car Championship	Chandler Motorsport	13	0	0	0	0	143	17th
2021	Junior Saloon Car Championship	Jeakins Race Preparation	3	0	0	0	0	143	17th
2022	TCR UK Touring Car Championship	Essex & Kent Motorsport	11	0	0	0	0	36	21st
2023	TCR UK Touring Car Championship	Restart Racing	12	0	0	1	0	109	12th
2023	TCR Spain Touring Car Championship	ALM Motorsport	4	0	0	0	0	97	7th
2024	British Touring Car Championship	Restart Racing	30	0	0	0	0	20	21st
