= Colin Turkington =

British racing driver (born 1982)

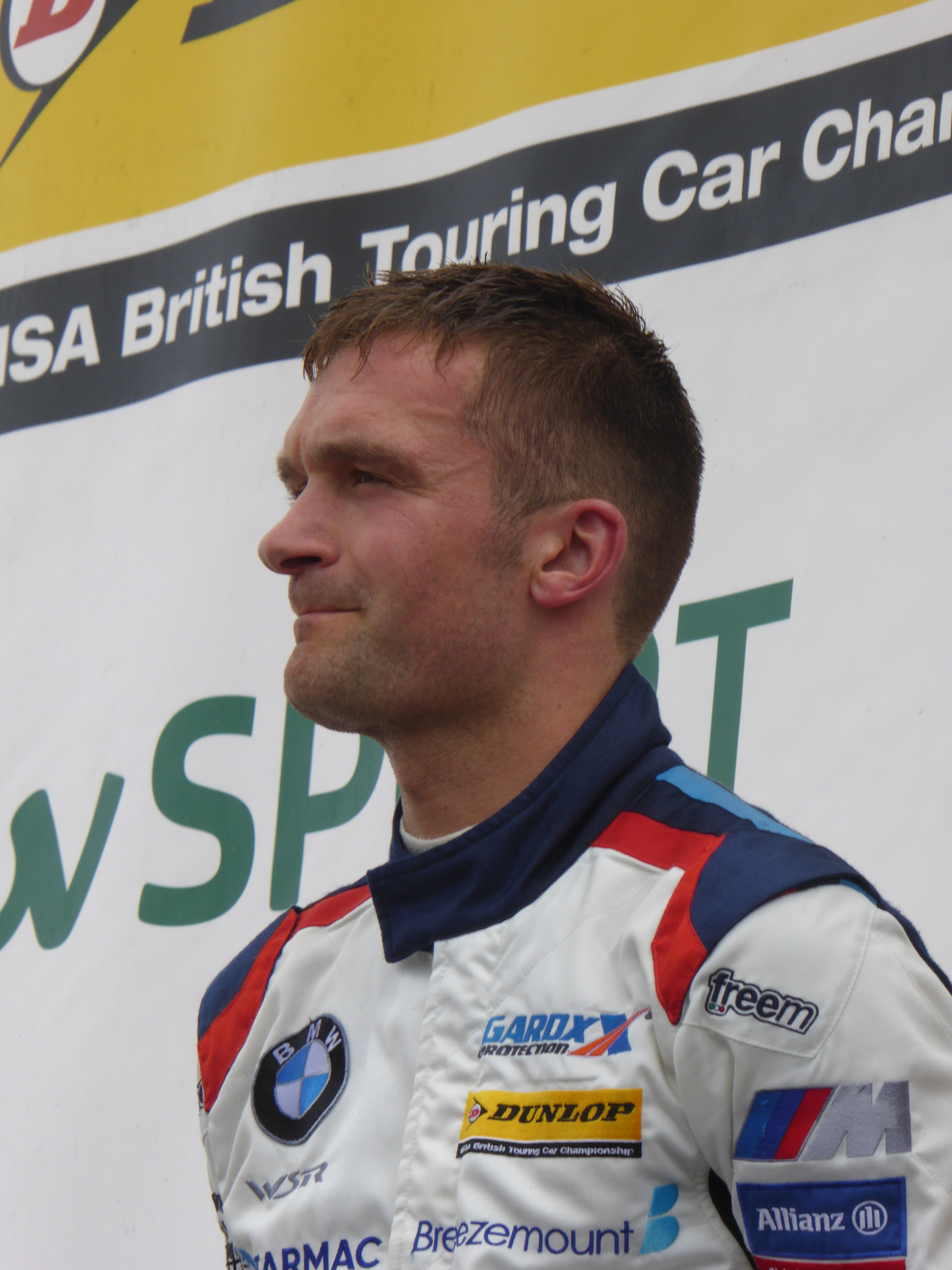
- Turkington at the Knockhill round of the 2017 British Touring Car Championship
- Nationality: (United Kingdom) British
- Born: Colin Henry Turkington; 21 March 1982 (age 44) Portadown, County Armagh, Northern Ireland
- Relatives: Gary Turkington (brother); James Turkington (brother); Lewis Turkington (son); Adam Turkington (son)

British GT Championship career
- Debut season: 2026
- Current team: WSR FlexiFly
- Categorisation: FIA Gold
- Car number: 61
- Co-driver: Ernie Graham
- Starts: 8 (8 entries)
- Wins: 0
- Poles: 0
- Fastest laps: 0
- Best finish: 12th in 2026

Previous series
- 2002-09, 2013-24 2011 2013 2007, 2010–12 2011 2000–01: British Touring Car Championship; Britcar 24hr Superstars Series; WTCC; STCC; Ford Fiesta Cup

Championship titles
- 2009, 2014, 2018, 2019 2001 1998: British Touring Car Championship; Ford Fiesta Cup; Northern Irish Metro Championship

Awards
- 2020-21, 24 2019, 2014, 2009: Goodyear Wingfoot Award; Autosport National Driver of the Year

Colin Henry Turkington (born 21 March 1982) is a British racing driver from Northern Ireland who currently competes in the British GT Championship for WSR FlexiFly. He has previously competed in the BTCC from his debut in 2002 to 2009, and from 2013 to 2024. He is a 4 time champion in the BTCC, winning the title in 2009, 2014, 2018 and 2019.

== Personal life ==
Away from the track, Turkington is married to Louise Turkington and has two brothers, Gary and James.

His sons, Lewis and Adam, both race in lower series, with Lewis racing in the BRSCC Fiesta Junior Championship and Adam racing in the British Autograss Series. He also has two pets, a cat called Jackie and a dog called Basil.

Turkington also owns a brand simply called Turkington Construction.

== Career ==
=== Early career ===
Turkington, who was born in Portadown, began his racing career in the Ulster Karting series in 1993. He competed in autograss in 1996 and 1997, before moving on to the Northern Irish Metro Championship in 1998, where he won his first title. He moved on to the Ford Credit Fiesta Zetec Championship in Britain in 1999, winning the title in 2001.

=== British Touring Car Championship ===
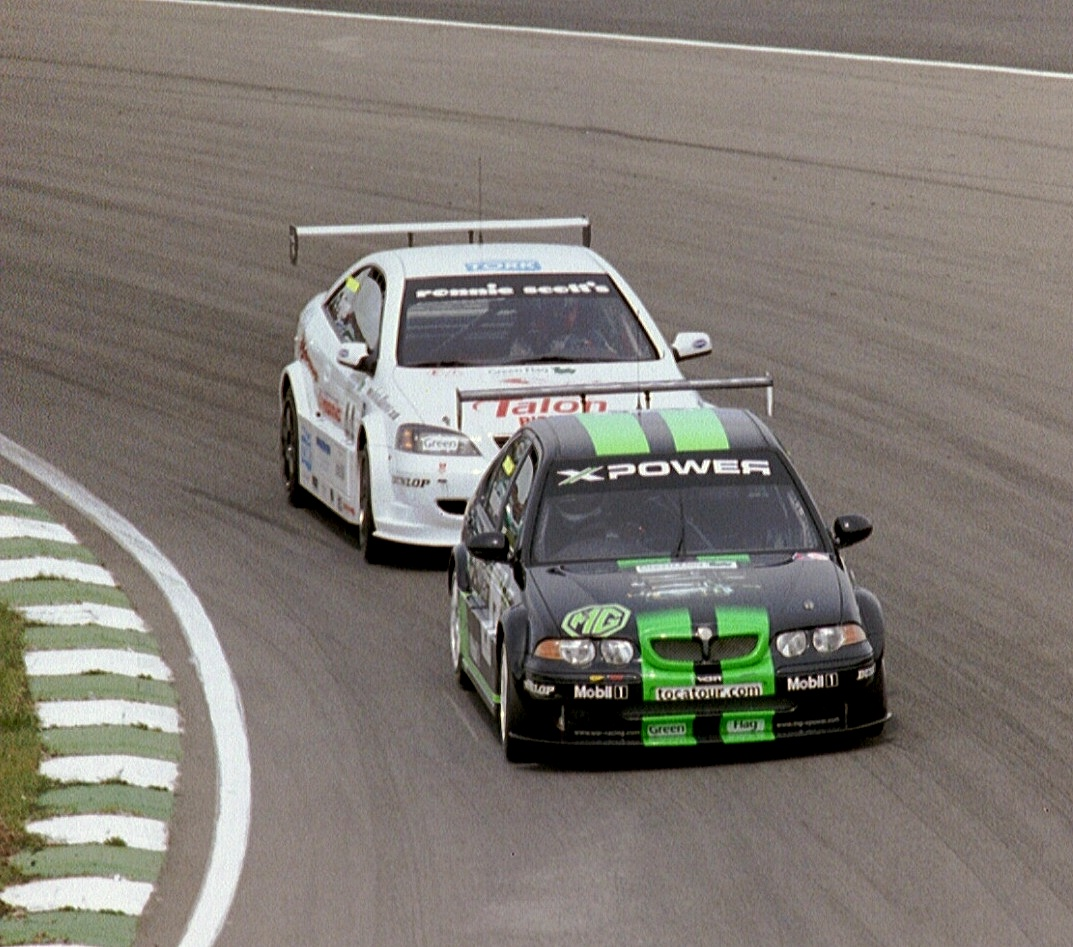
Turkington leading Gavin Pyper at Brands Hatch in 2003.

==== Team Atomic Kitten (2002) ====
Turkington moved to the BTCC in 2002. His first BTCC drive was in a year-old MG ZS, sponsored by the pop group Atomic Kitten, partnering fellow Fiesta graduate Gareth Howell. He finished 14th in the Drivers' Championship.

==== West Surrey Racing (2003–04) ====
For 2003, Turkington moved to the manufacturer-backed West Surrey Racing, winning his first race at Brands Hatch and finishing eighth in the Drivers' Championship. Despite the loss of official MG backing in 2004, he finished sixth in the 2004 Drivers' Championship, taking the second win of his BTCC career at Mondello Park.

==== Vauxhall (2005) ====
For 2005, Turkington replaced champion James Thompson at Vauxhall. He finished sixth in the Drivers' Championship again, a performance which was not enough for him to retain the seat for the following season.

==== West Surrey Racing (2006–2009; 2013–2014) ====
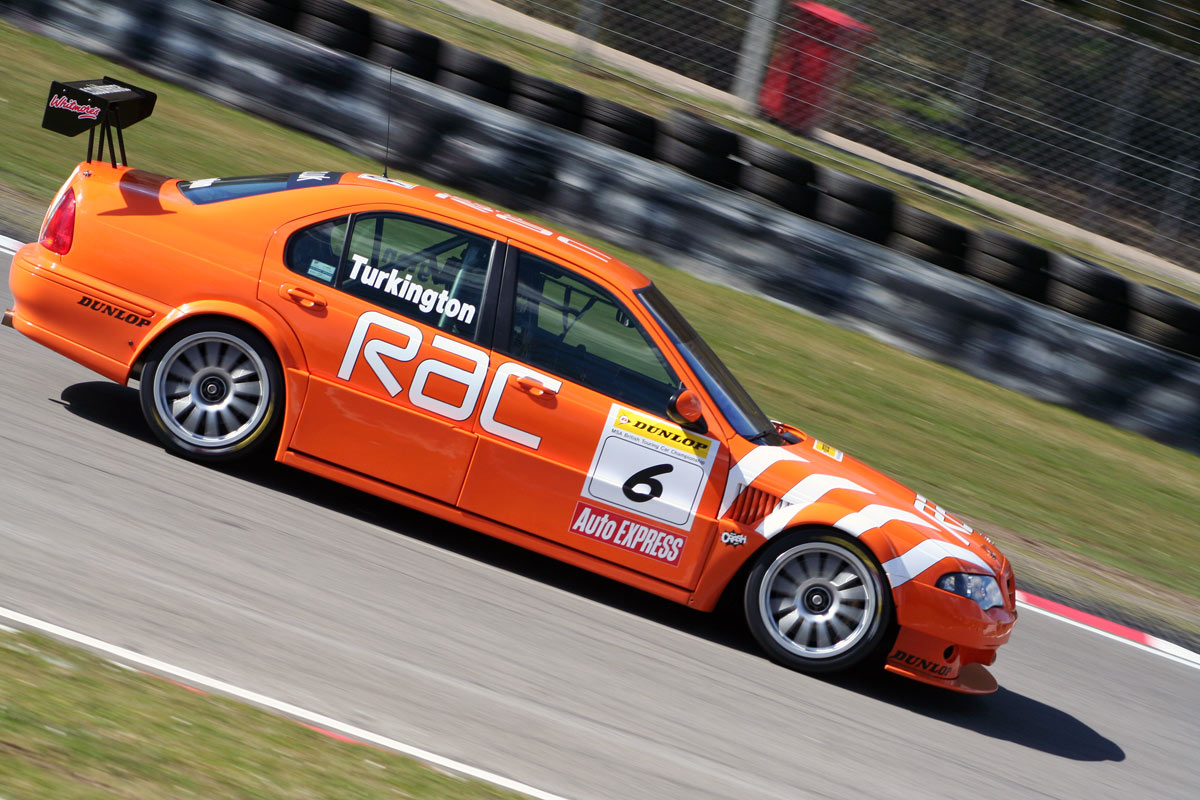
Turkington driving the Team RAC-run MG at Brands Hatch in 2006

For 2006, Turkington rejoined WSR to drive an RAC-backed MG ZS alongside Rob Collard. A strong first half of the season made him the closest challenger to Matt Neal for the title, although Jason Plato pipped him to second in the Drivers' Championship in the final race of the year. Late in the season, the team switched to bio-ethanol fuel, almost becoming the first team to win a race with it. He finished third in the 2006 Drivers' Championship, with two wins and 14 podium finishes.

For 2007, the BTC-spec MG was no longer eligible to win the championship outright, so the team switched to the BMW 320si. Turkington's first win of the season (and BMW's first in the BTCC for over a decade) came in the fourth weekend of the championship at Croft. Turkington went on to win his first Independent Drivers' title, finishing fifth in the overall Drivers' Championship, with three wins.

Turkington competed with WSR in the Brands Hatch and Macau rounds of the World Touring Car Championship in 2007. At Brands Hatch, he finished third in the first race on and then finished fourth in the second race, but as his car was not homologated because of its sequential gearbox, Turkington did not collect championship points. In Macau, he finished 13th and eighth in the two races.

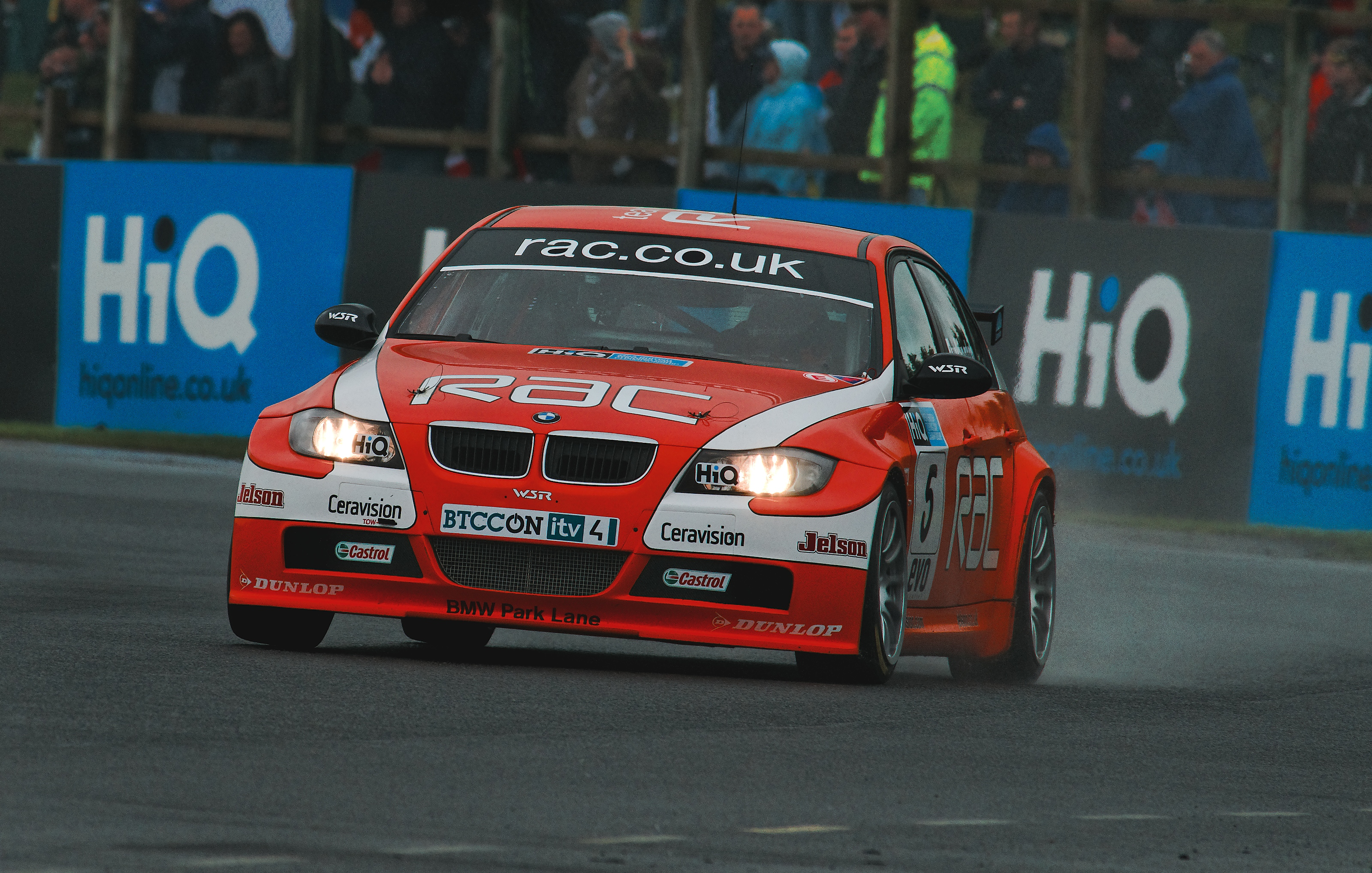
Turkington driving the Team RAC-run BMW at Croft in 2008

In 2008, he was joined at WSR by Formula Three driver Stephen Jelley. Turkington won four races on his way to fifth in the Drivers' Championship, while also retaining his Independent Drivers' crown. He also finished every race that season in the top-ten.

In 2009, Turkington took the championship lead at the mid-season point, and went on to win the BTCC title in a thrilling finale, after winning six races. Turkington finished consistently, with an unbroken run of eighteen point-scoring finishes, from Croft onwards, failing to finish in just one race. However WSR lost the title sponsor RAC and Turkington could not attempt to retain his title in 2010.

In 2013, Turkington returned to the BTCC with WSR (now competing as eBay Motors). He drove one of their three new BMW 125is. He finished fifth in the 2013 Drivers' Championship after taking five race wins.

Turkington stayed with the team for the 2014 season, taking eight race wins and eventually winning his second BTCC Drivers' title.

==== Team BMR (2015–2016) ====
After winning the championship with eBay Motors in 2014, Turkington switched to Team BMR for the 2015 season, driving alongside Jason Plato, Aron Smith and Warren Scott. In 2016, Team BMR announced a change of car to the Subaru Levorg, and after months of testing entered it into the 2016 season. The Subaru idea sprung up when Jason Plato and one of his engineers were talking back in 2012 about a works Subaru team. After a slow start at Brands Hatch and Donington Park where the team spent their time trying to develop the Subaru, Turkington scored a best finish of tenth at Donington Park. The team withdrew all four Subarus from the Thruxton round after an issue with the fuel line potentially causing fires.

The Levorg gained its first win in the BTCC at Oulton Park in Round 10. Turkington took a further four wins before the season ended and finished fourth in the drivers championship standings.

==== West Surrey Racing (2017–2024) ====
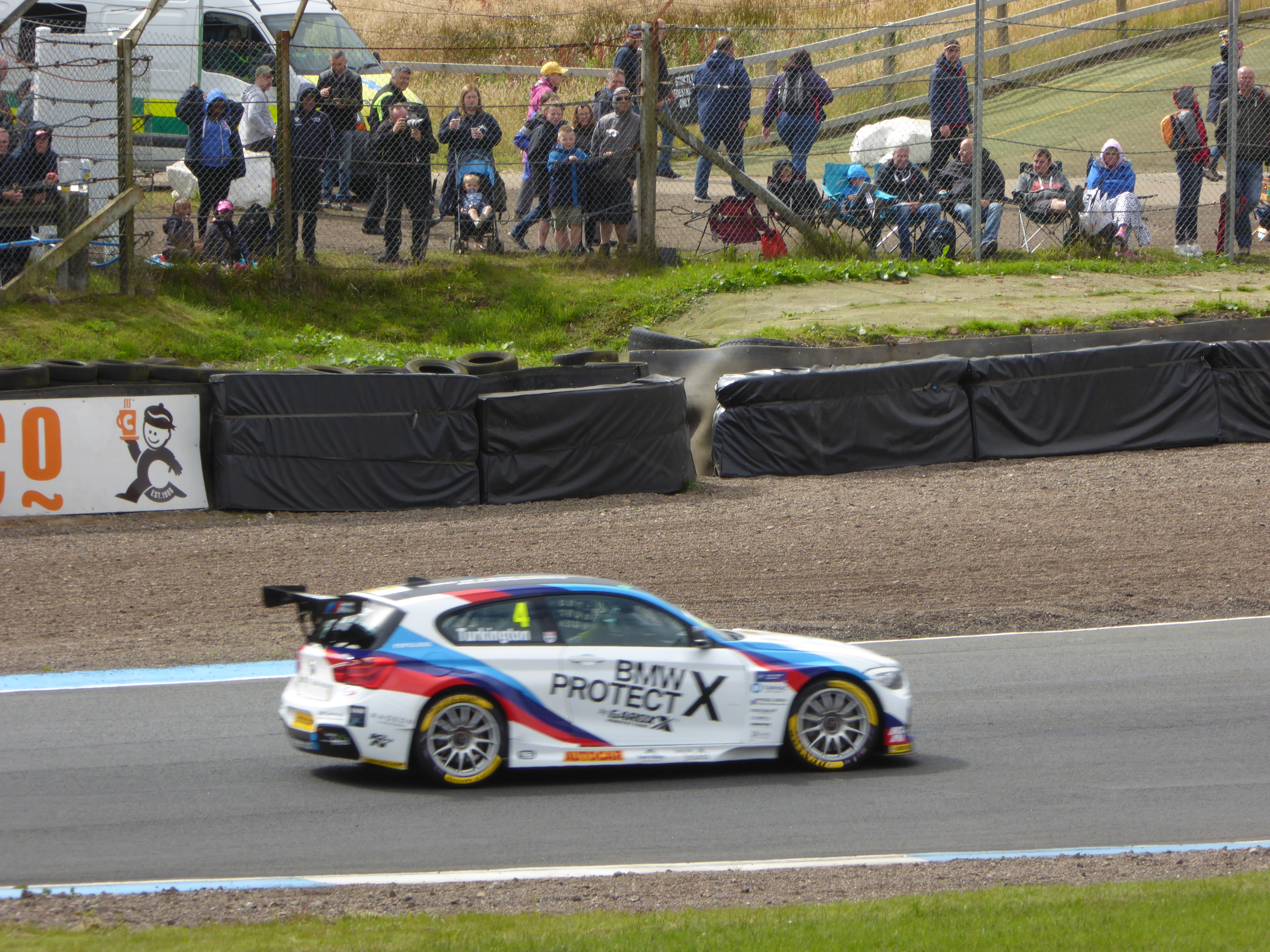
Turkington at the Knockhill round of the 2017 British Touring Car Championship

For 2017, Turkington once again re-joined the outfit headed by Dick Bennetts; the source of his previous two championship victories. He joined Andrew Jordan and Rob Collard in a trio of BMW 125i M Sports - the car was a development from when Turkington won the 2014 championship.

Turkington collided with Matt Neal off the startline at the season opener at Brands Hatch, but salvaged a ninth-place finish in Race 2 from the back of the grid after a last-gasp move on Michael Epps. He finished second in Race 3 behind teammate Andrew Jordan. During the year, the Ulsterman took four race wins, including the 100th BTCC win for BMW at Thruxton. He went into the final round battling for the championship with his replacement at Team BMR, Ashley Sutton. Despite the title fight going down to the final race, his hopes ended when he collided with Mat Jackson early in the race, meaning he finished the year as runner-up.

In 2018, Turkington would become champion again, beating Tom Ingram to take his third title, despite winning only a single race all season.

The 2019 season saw Turkington claim five race victories, but looked set to be beaten to the title by Halford Yuasa Racing driver Dan Cammish. However, with two laps to go in the final race of the season at Brands Hatch, Cammish suffered a brake failure, resulting in a collsion with the outside wall. As a result, Turkington won his record equalling fourth BTCC title, a record shared at the time with Andy Rouse, and subsequently Ashley Sutton.

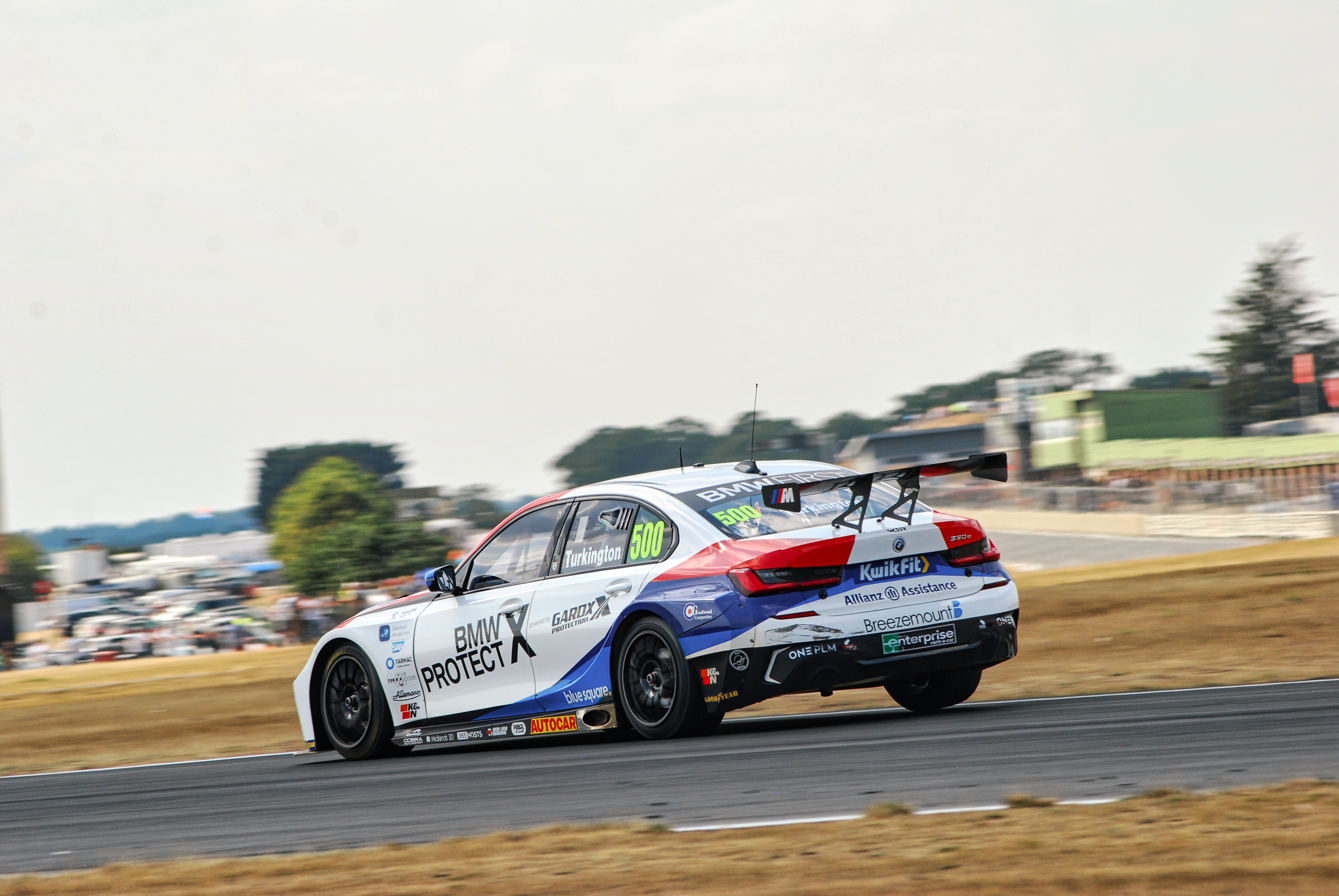
Turkington during his 500th BTCC race at Snetterton in 2022.

In early 2025, Turkington confirmed his absence from the grid for the following season.

=== World Touring Car Championship ===
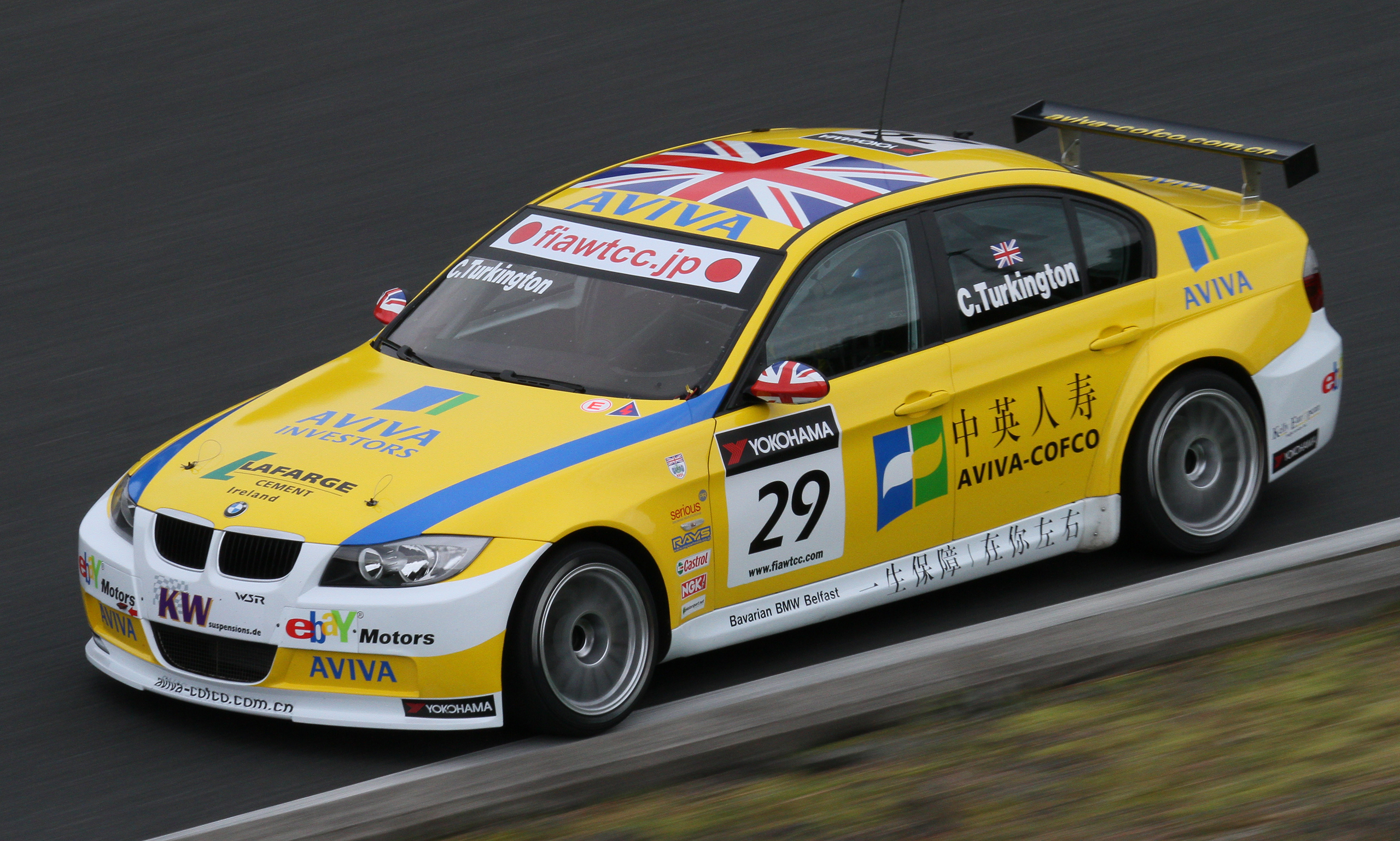
Turkington driving for Team Aviva-COFCO at the 2010 FIA WTCC Race of Japan

In 2010, Turkington competed in three rounds of the 2010 World Touring Car Championship series (WTCC) driving a BMW for WSR at Algarve, Brands Hatch and Brno. At Brands Hatch, he was the top BMW on the grid in fourth, eventually finishing third in race one and fifth in race two, comfortably winning the Independents' class in both races. With additional points awarded to an Independent driver finishing in the top-ten positions overall, Turkington moved into second place in the Independents' championship, despite having only competed in two meetings at that point. On 1 August 2010, the WTCC altered their regulations which effectively stopped Turkington being classed as an Independent.

In October 2010, it was announced that Turkington and WSR would compete in the final two rounds of the WTCC in Japan and Macau. He took his first WTCC win in Japan after Augusto Farfus and Andy Priaulx were disqualified.

In July 2011, Turkington competed in three more WTCC rounds for Wiechers-Sport.

On 26 October 2012, Turkington announced that he would again be racing in the WTCC at China for the WSR-run Team Aviva-Cofco. Turkington drove the spare RML Group Chevrolet Cruze 1.6t. He qualified fifth on the grid, but first-lap incidents in both races meant he had to recover from near the back of the field twice. His efforts were rewarded with two points finishes.

=== Scandinavian Touring Car Championship ===
For 2011, Turkington drove a BMW 320si in the Scandinavian Touring Car Championship for Flash Engineering, as teammate of Jan Nilsson. Turkington scored five podium finishes in 18 races but no wins, and finished fifth in the Drivers' Championship.

=== British GT Championship ===
On 20 February 2026, it was announced that Turkington would be competing full time in the GT4 Pro-Am category of the 2026 British GT Championship, sharing a BMW M4 GT4 EVO with 3 time FIA European Historic Rally champion Ernie Graham. The car will be run by West Surrey Racing, with the team making their debut in GT racing in the process.

=== Other work ===
Turkington was elected to the MSA's Race Elite Scheme in April 2007, along with five other drivers in various British series. He has also done TV work, presenting a BBC Northern Ireland report on environmental damage in 2002.

== Racing record ==
=== Complete British Touring Car Championship results ===
(key) Races in bold indicate pole position (1 point awarded – 2002–2003 all races, 2004–present just in first race) Races in italics indicate fastest lap (1 point awarded all races) * signifies that driver lead race for at least one lap (1 point awarded – 2002 just in feature races, 2003–present all races)

Year	Team	Car	Class	1	2	3	4	5	6	7	8	9	10	11	12	13	14	15	16	17	18	19	20	21	22	23	24	25	26	27	28	29	30	DC	Points
2002	Team Atomic Kitten	MG ZS	T	BRH; 1	BRH; 2	OUL; 1; 19	OUL; 2 Ret	THR; 1 Ret	THR; 2 Ret	SIL; 1 Ret	SIL; 2; 12	MON; 1 DNS	MON; 2 DNS	CRO; 1; 3	CRO; 2; 5	SNE; 1; 9	SNE; 2; 4	KNO; 1; 8	KNO; 2 Ret	BRH; 1 Ret	BRH; 2; 16	DON; 1; 11	DON; 2 Ret											14th	29
2003	MG Sport & Racing	MG ZS	T	MON; 1 DNS	MON; 2 Ret	BRH; 1; 6	BRH; 2 Ret	THR; 1; 8	THR; 2 Ret	SIL; 1; 3	SIL; 2; 8	ROC; 1 Ret	ROC; 2 Ret	CRO; 1; 4	CRO; 2; 7	SNE; 1 Ret	SNE; 2; 4	BRH; 1; 3*	BRH; 2; 1*	DON; 1; 19	DON; 2; 2	OUL; 1; 5	OUL; 2; 3											8th	97
2004	West Surrey Racing	MG ZS		THR; 1; 14	THR; 2; 10	THR; 3; 6	**BRH**; **1**; 6	BRH; 2; 5	BRH; 3; 5	SIL; 1; 11	SIL; 2; 5	SIL; 3; 12	OUL; 1; 4	OUL; 2; 6	OUL; 3; 5	MON; 1; 3	MON; 2; 6	MON; 3; 1*	CRO; 1; 6	CRO; 2; 7	CRO; 3; 3	KNO; 1; 4	KNO; 2 Ret	KNO; 3; 3	BRH; 1; 10	**BRH**; **2**; 2*	BRH; 3; 11*	SNE; 1; 4	SNE; 2; 5	SNE; 3; 7	DON; 1; 3	DON; 2; 7	DON; 3; 6	6th	173
2005	VX Racing	Vauxhall Astra Sport Hatch		**DON**; **1**; 5	DON; 2 Ret	DON; 3; 8	THR; 1; 4	THR; 2; 7	THR; 3; 2	BRH; 1; 2	BRH; 2; 5	BRH; 3; 5	OUL; 1; 10	OUL; 2; 6	OUL; 3 Ret	**CRO**; **1**; 1*	**CRO**; **2**; 2	CRO; 3; 7	MON; 1; 4	MON; 2; 1*	MON; 3; 5	SNE; 1; 7	SNE; 2; 7	SNE; 3 Ret	**KNO**; **1**; 3	KNO; 2; 4	KNO; 3; 7	SIL; 1; 7	SIL; 2 Ret	SIL; 3; 9	BRH; 1; 7	BRH; 2 Ret	BRH; 3; 6	6th	174
2006	Team RAC	MG ZS		BRH; 1; 4	BRH; 2; 2	BRH; 3; 2	MON; 1; 4	MON; 2; 3	MON; 3; 2	OUL; 1; 7	OUL; 2; 17	OUL; 3; 5	THR; 1; 8	THR; 2; 6	THR; 3; 1*	CRO; 1; 4	CRO; 2; 3	CRO; 3; 2	DON; 1; 2*	DON; 2; 8	DON; 3; 1*	SNE; 1 Ret	SNE; 2; 3	SNE; 3; 4	KNO; 1; 7	KNO; 2; 9	KNO; 3 Ret*	BRH; 1; 3	BRH; 2; 3	BRH; 3; 4	SIL; 1; 2	SIL; 2 DSQ	SIL; 3; 2	3rd	240
2007	Team RAC	BMW 320si		**BRH**; **1**; 2	BRH; 2; 2	BRH; 3 Ret	ROC; 1; 7	ROC; 2 Ret	ROC; 3 Ret	THR; 1; 4	THR; 2; 5*	THR; 3; 17	CRO; 1; 1*	**CRO**; **2** Ret*	CRO; 3; 9	**OUL**; **1**; 3*	OUL; 2; 1*	OUL; 3 Ret	DON; 1; 7	DON; 2; 9	**DON**; **3**; 6*	**SNE**; **1** DSQ	SNE; 2; 9	SNE; 3; 6	**BRH**; **1**; 4*	BRH; 2; 9	BRH; 3; 1*	KNO; 1; 2	KNO; 2; 2	KNO; 3; 6	THR; 1; 6	THR; 2; 4	THR; 3; 11	5th	184
2008	Team RAC	BMW 320si		BRH; 1; 20	BRH; 2; 8	BRH; 3; 1*	ROC; 1; 16	ROC; 2; 6	ROC; 3; 7*	DON; 1; 9*	DON; 2; 13	DON; 3; 12	THR; 1; 2	THR; 2; 2*	THR; 3; 6	CRO; 1; 1*	**CRO**; **2**; 1*	CRO; 3; 8	SNE; 1; 5	SNE; 2; 2	SNE; 3; 6	OUL; 1; 4	OUL; 2; 1*	OUL; 3; 7	KNO; 1; 5	KNO; 2; 7	KNO; 3; 15	SIL; 1; 4	SIL; 2; 2	SIL; 3; 4	BRH; 1; 4	BRH; 2; 3	BRH; 3; 5	4th	212
2009	Team RAC	BMW 320si		BRH; 1; 3*	BRH; 2; 2*	BRH; 3; 4	THR; 1; 4	THR; 2; 1*	THR; 3; 9	DON; 1 Ret	DON; 2; 5	DON; 3; 2	OUL; 1; 1*	**OUL**; **2**; 1*	OUL; 3; 11	**CRO**; **1**; 1*	**CRO**; **2**; 1*	CRO; 3; 6	SNE; 1; 5	SNE; 2; 2	SNE; 3; 1	KNO; 1; 4	KNO; 2; 3	KNO; 3; 5	SIL; 1; 4	SIL; 2; 4	SIL; 3; 3	ROC; 1; 10	ROC; 2; 4	ROC; 3; 4	BRH; 1; 8	BRH; 2; 3	BRH; 3; 2*	1st	275
2013	eBay Motors	BMW 125i M Sport		BRH; 1; 8	BRH; 2; 8	BRH; 3; 9	DON; 1; 8	DON; 2; 9	DON; 3; 1*	THR; 1; 6	THR; 2; 11	THR; 3; 10	OUL; 1; 5	OUL; 2; 3	OUL; 3; 2	**CRO**; **1**; 1*	**CRO**; **2**; 1*	CRO; 3; 2	SNE; 1; 4	SNE; 2; 6*	SNE; 3; 6*	KNO; 1; 1*	**KNO**; **2**; 1*	KNO; 3 DSQ	ROC; 1; 6	ROC; 2; 3	ROC; 3; 2	SIL; 1; 4	SIL; 2; 5	SIL; 3 Ret*	BRH; 1 Ret	BRH; 2; 12	BRH; 3; 4	5th	347
2014	eBay Motors	BMW 125i M Sport		BRH; 1; 8	BRH; 2; 3	BRH; 3; 1*	DON; 1; 5	DON; 2; 6	**DON**; **3**; 2*	THR; 1; 8	THR; 2; 6	THR; 3; 1*	**OUL**; **1**; 1*	**OUL**; **2**; 1*	OUL; 3; 3	**CRO**; **1**; 1*	**CRO**; **2**; 1*	CRO; 3 Ret	SNE; 1; 2	SNE; 2; 2*	SNE; 3; 3	KNO; 1 Ret	KNO; 2; 4	KNO; 3; 3	ROC; 1; 1*	**ROC**; **2**; 1*	ROC; 3; 4	SIL; 1; 2*	SIL; 2; 2*	SIL; 3; 3	BRH; 1; 3	BRH; 2 Ret	BRH; 3; 20	1st	433
2015	Team BMR RCIB Insurance	Volkswagen CC		BRH; 1; 5	BRH; 2; 3	BRH; 3; 12	**DON**; **1**; 3	DON; 2; 1*	DON; 3; 11	THR; 1; 7	THR; 2; 5	THR; 3; 4	OUL; 1; 25	OUL; 2; 8	OUL; 3; 6	CRO; 1; 7	CRO; 2; 3	CRO; 3; 4	**SNE**; **1**; 1*	**SNE**; **2**; 1*	SNE; 3; 7	KNO; 1; 10	KNO; 2 Ret	KNO; 3; 15	ROC; 1; 7	ROC; 2; 8	ROC; 3; 3	SIL; 1; 5	SIL; 2; 8	SIL; 3; 1*	BRH; 1; 4	BRH; 2 Ret	BRH; 3; 12	4th	310
2016	Silverline Subaru BMR Racing	Subaru Levorg GT		BRH; 1 Ret	BRH; 2; 20	BRH; 3; 12	DON; 1; 10	DON; 2 Ret	DON; 3; 18	THR; 1 WD	THR; 2 WD	THR; 3 WD	**OUL**; **1**; 1*	**OUL**; **2**; 2	OUL; 3; 7	**CRO**; **1**; 1*	**CRO**; **2**; 3*	CRO; 3; 7	SNE; 1; 1*	**SNE**; **2**; 2	SNE; 3; 6	KNO; 1; 3	KNO; 2; 4	KNO; 3; 24	ROC; 1; 5	ROC; 2; 15	ROC; 3; 3	SIL; 1; 8	SIL; 2; 4	SIL; 3; 4	**BRH**; **1**; 1*	**BRH**; **2**; 1*	BRH; 3; 12	4th	289
2017	Team BMW	BMW 125i M Sport		BRH; 1 Ret	BRH; 2; 9	BRH; 3; 2	DON; 1; 4	DON; 2; 5	DON; 3; 1	THR; 1; 7	THR; 2; 6	**THR**; **3**; 1*	OUL; 1; 29	OUL; 2; 13	OUL; 3; 5	CRO; 1; 2	CRO; 2; 1*	CRO; 3; 6	SNE; 1; 7*	SNE; 2; 2	SNE; 3; 3	KNO; 1; 3	KNO; 2; 3	KNO; 3; 3	ROC; 1; 6	ROC; 2; 3	ROC; 3; 6	SIL; 1; 4	SIL; 2; 3	SIL; 3; 22	BRH; 1; 15	BRH; 2; 1*	BRH; 3 Ret	2nd	351
2018	Team BMW	BMW 125i M Sport		BRH; 1; 2	BRH; 2; 27	BRH; 3; 9	DON; 1; 10	DON; 2 Ret	DON; 3; 21	THR; 1; 2	THR; 2; 2*	THR; 3; 5	OUL; 1; 6	OUL; 2; 1*	OUL; 3; 3	CRO; 1; 5	CRO; 2; 3	CRO; 3; 5	SNE; 1; 15	SNE; 2 Ret	SNE; 3; 6	ROC; 1; 7	ROC; 2; 5	ROC; 3; 2	KNO; 1; 2	KNO; 2; 4*	KNO; 3; 2	SIL; 1; 8	SIL; 2; 8	SIL; 3; 3	BRH; 1; 12	BRH; 2; 22	BRH; 3; 23	1st	304
2019	Team BMW	BMW 330i M Sport		BRH; 1; 19	BRH; 2; 14	BRH; 3; 5	**DON**; **1**; 1*	**DON**; **2**; 1*	DON; 3; 9	THR; 1; 4	THR; 2; 2	THR; 3; 9	CRO; 1; 4	CRO; 2; 2	CRO; 3; 6	**OUL**; **1**; 1*	**OUL**; **2**; 1*	OUL; 3; 8	SNE; 1; 4	SNE; 2; 1*	SNE; 3; 9	THR; 1; 13	THR; 2; 9	THR; 3; 13	KNO; 1; 4	KNO; 2; 19	KNO; 3; 10	SIL; 1; 14	SIL; 2; 2	SIL; 3; 7	**BRH**; **1**; 5	BRH; 2; 25	BRH; 3; 6	1st	320
2020	Team BMW	BMW 330i M Sport		**DON**; **1**; 2*	DON; 2; 1*	DON; 3; 10	BRH; 1; 2	BRH; 2; 1*	BRH; 3; 5	OUL; 1; 4	OUL; 2; 3	OUL; 3; 2	KNO; 1; 2	KNO; 2; 2	KNO; 3; 9	THR; 1 NC	THR; 2; 13	THR; 3; 8	SIL; 1; 4	SIL; 2; 1*	SIL; 3; 10	CRO; 1; 3	CRO; 2 Ret	CRO; 3 NC	**SNE**; **1**; 1*	**SNE**; **2**; 1*	SNE; 3; 3	BRH; 1; 9	BRH; 2; 4	BRH; 3; 9				2nd	336
2021	Team BMW	BMW 330i M Sport		THR; 1; 10	THR; 2; 7	THR; 3; 6	**SNE**; **1**; 1*	**SNE**; **2**; 2*	SNE; 3; 7	BRH; 1; 20	BRH; 2; 17	BRH; 3; 14	OUL; 1; 18	OUL; 2; 12	OUL; 3; 8	**KNO**; **1**; 1*	**KNO**; **2**; 2*	KNO; 3; 8	THR; 1; 12	THR; 2; 6	THR; 3; 2	CRO; 1; 4	CRO; 2; 7	**CRO**; **3**; 1*	SIL; 1; 6	SIL; 2; 3	SIL; 3; 8	DON; 1; 5	DON; 2; 11	**DON**; **3**; 1*	BRH; 1; 7	BRH; 2; 4	BRH; 3 Ret	2nd	306
2022	Team BMW	BMW 330e M Sport		DON; 1; 2*	DON; 2; 14	DON; 3; 8	**BRH**; **1**; 5*	BRH; 2; 10	BRH; 3; 1*	THR; 1; 4	THR; 2; 4	THR; 3; 2	OUL; 1; 4	OUL; 2; 3	OUL; 3 Ret	**CRO**; **1**; 2	CRO; 2; 3	CRO; 3; 6	KNO; 1; 3	KNO; 2; 3	KNO; 3; 4	**SNE**; **1**; 1*	**SNE**; **2**; 1*	SNE; 3; 6	THR; 1; 10	THR; 2; 10	THR; 3; 2	SIL; 1 NC	SIL; 2; 13	SIL; 3; 12	BRH; 1; 5	BRH; 2; 3	BRH; 3; 12	4th	348
2023	Team BMW	BMW 330e M Sport		DON; 1; 12	DON; 2; 8	DON; 3; 5	BRH; 1; 1*	BRH; 2; 3	BRH; 3; 5	SNE; 1; 3	SNE; 2; 3	SNE; 3; 7	THR; 1; 6	THR; 2; 6	THR; 3; 4	OUL; 1; 9	OUL; 2; 4	OUL; 3; 1*	CRO; 1; 7	CRO; 2; 6	**CRO**; **3**; 1*	KNO; 1; 11	KNO; 2 Ret	KNO; 3; 17	DON; 1; 5	DON; 2; 4	DON; 3; 6	SIL; 1 Ret	SIL; 2; 8	**SIL**; **3**; 1*	BRH; 1; 4	BRH; 2 Ret	BRH; 3; 10	4th	312
2024	Team BMW	BMW 330e M Sport		DON; 1; 4	DON; 2; 5	DON; 3; 2	**BRH**; **1**; 1*	**BRH**; **2**; 1*	BRH; 3; 8	SNE; 1; 8	SNE; 2; 15	SNE; 3; 7	THR; 1; 9	THR; 2; 7	THR; 3; 7	OUL; 1; 20	OUL; 2; 7	OUL; 3; 15	**CRO**; **1**; 1*	**CRO**; **2**; 9	CRO; 3; 14	**KNO**; **1**; 1*	**KNO**; **2**; 3*	KNO; 3; 9	DON; 1; 1*	**DON**; **2**; 2	DON; 3; 7	SIL; 1; 5	SIL; 2; 2	SIL; 3 Ret	**BRH**; **1**; 2*	BRH; 2; 3	BRH; 3; 5	4th	346
2025	Laser Tools Racing with MB Motorsport	BMW 330i M Sport LCI		DON; 1	DON; 2	DON; 3	BRH; 1	BRH; 2	BRH; 3	SNE; 1	SNE; 2	SNE; 3	THR; 1	THR; 2	THR; 3	OUL; 1	OUL; 2	OUL; 3	CRO; 1 DNS†	CRO; 2	CRO; 3	KNO; 1	KNO; 2	KNO; 3	DON; 1	DON; 2	DON; 3	SIL; 1	SIL; 2	SIL; 3	BRH; 1	BRH; 2	BRH; 3	NC	0

† Competed in Free Practice session only.

=== Complete World Touring Car Championship results ===
(key) (Races in bold indicate pole position) (Races in italics indicate fastest lap)

Year	Team	Car	1	2	3	4	5	6	7	8	9	10	11	12	13	14	15	16	17	18	19	20	21	22	23	24	DC	Pts
2007	Team RAC/AVIVA	BMW 320si	BRA; 1	BRA; 2	NED; 1	NED; 2	ESP; 1	ESP; 2	FRA; 1	FRA; 2	CZE; 1	CZE; 2	POR; 1	POR; 2	SWE; 1	SWE; 2	GER; 1	GER; 2	GBR; 1; 3	GBR; 2; 4	ITA; 1	ITA; 2	MAC; 1; 14	MAC; 2; 8			NC†	0†
2010	eBay Motors	BMW 320si	BRA; 1	BRA; 2	MAR; 1	MAR; 2	ITA; 1	ITA; 2	BEL; 1	BEL; 2	POR; 1; 12	POR; 2; 10	GBR; 1; 3	GBR; 2; 2	CZE; 1; 6	CZE; 2; 2	GER; 1	GER; 2	ESP; 1	ESP; 2							10th	97
2010	Team Aviva-COFCO	BMW 320si																			JPN; 1; 4	JPN; 2; 1	MAC; 1 Ret	MAC; 2; 13			10th	97
2011	Wiechers-Sport	BMW 320 TC	BRA; 1	BRA; 2	BEL; 1	BEL; 2	ITA; 1	ITA; 2	HUN; 1	HUN; 2	CZE; 1	CZE; 2	POR; 1	POR; 2	GBR; 1; 10	GBR; 2; 10	GER; 1	GER; 2	ESP; 1	ESP; 2	JPN; 1; 6	JPN; 2; 7	CHN; 1; 2	CHN; 2; 4	MAC; 1	MAC; 2	13th	46
2012	Team Aviva-Cofco	Chevrolet Cruze 1.6T	ITA; 1	ITA; 2	ESP; 1	ESP; 2	MAR; 1	MAR; 2	SVK; 1	SVK; 2	HUN; 1	HUN; 2	AUT; 1	AUT; 2	POR; 1	POR; 2	BRA; 1	BRA; 2	USA; 1	USA; 2	JPN; 1	JPN; 2	CHN; 1; 6	CHN; 2; 7	MAC; 1	MAC; 2	18th	15

† Not eligible for points.

=== Complete Scandinavian Touring Car Championship results ===
(key) (Races in bold indicate pole position) (Races in italics indicate fastest lap)

Year	Team	Car	1	2	3	4	5	6	7	8	9	10	11	12	13	14	15	16	17	18	DC	Pts
2011	Flash Engineering	BMW 320si	JYL; 1; 7	JYL; 2; 2	KNU; 1; 6	KNU; 2; 3	MAN; 1 Ret	MAN; 2; 10	GÖT; 1; 11	GÖT; 2; 10	FAL; 1; 4	FAL; 2; 3	KAR; 1; 16	KAR; 2; 9	JYL; 1; 2	JYL; 2 Ret	KNU; 1; 6	KNU; 2; 2	MAN; 1; 12	MAN; 2; 6	5th	130

=== Complete International Superstars Series results ===
(key) (Races in bold indicate pole position) (Races in italics indicate fastest lap)

Year	Team	Car	1	2	3	4	5	6	7	8	9	10	11	12	13	14	15	16	DC	Points
2013	Scuderia Giudici	BMW M3 (E92)	MNZ; 1	MNZ; 2	BRN; 1	BRN; 2	SVK; 1	SVK; 2	ZOL; 1	ZOL; 2	ALG; 1	ALG; 2	DON; 1; 10	DON; 2; 6	IMO; 1	IMO; 2	VAL; 1	VAL; 2	23rd	9

=== 24 Hours of Silverstone results ===
Year	Team	Co-Drivers	Car	Car No.	Class	Laps	Pos.	Class Pos.
2011	(United Kingdom) Rollcentre Racing	(United Kingdom) Matt Nicoll-Jones (United Kingdom) Mike Simpson (United Kingdom) Martin Short	Ginetta G55	30	1	80	DNF	DNF

=== Complete British GT Championship results ===
(key) (Races in bold indicate pole position) (Races in italics indicate fastest lap)

Year	Team	Car	Class	1	2	3	4	5	6	7	8	DC	Points
2026	WSR FlexiFly	BMW M4 GT4 Evo (G82)	GT4	SIL; 1; 20	OUL; 1; 21	OUL; 2 DSQ	SPA; 1; 22	SNE; 1; 18	SNE; 2; 19	DON; 1; 19	BRH; 1; 20	12th	31

== Notes ==
Sporting positions
Preceded by Fabrizio Giovanardi	British Touring Car Championship; Champion; 2009	Succeeded by Jason Plato
Preceded by Andrew Jordan	British Touring Car Championship; Champion; 2014	Succeeded by Gordon Shedden
Preceded by Ashley Sutton	British Touring Car Championship; Champion; 2018-2019	Succeeded by Ashley Sutton
Awards and achievements
Preceded by Oliver Turvey	Autosport Awards; National Driver of the Year; 2009	Succeeded by Jason Plato
Preceded by Andrew Jordan	Autosport Awards; National Driver of the Year; 2014	Succeeded by Gordon Shedden
Preceded by Dan Ticktum	Autosport Awards; National Driver of the Year; 2019	Succeeded by Harry King
Preceded by Inaugural	Goodyear Wingfoot Award; Winner; 2020-2021	Succeeded by Jake Hill
Preceded by Ashley Sutton	Goodyear Wingfoot Award; Winner; 2024	Succeeded by Tom Ingram
