= Jake Hill (racing driver) =

British racing driver (born 1994)

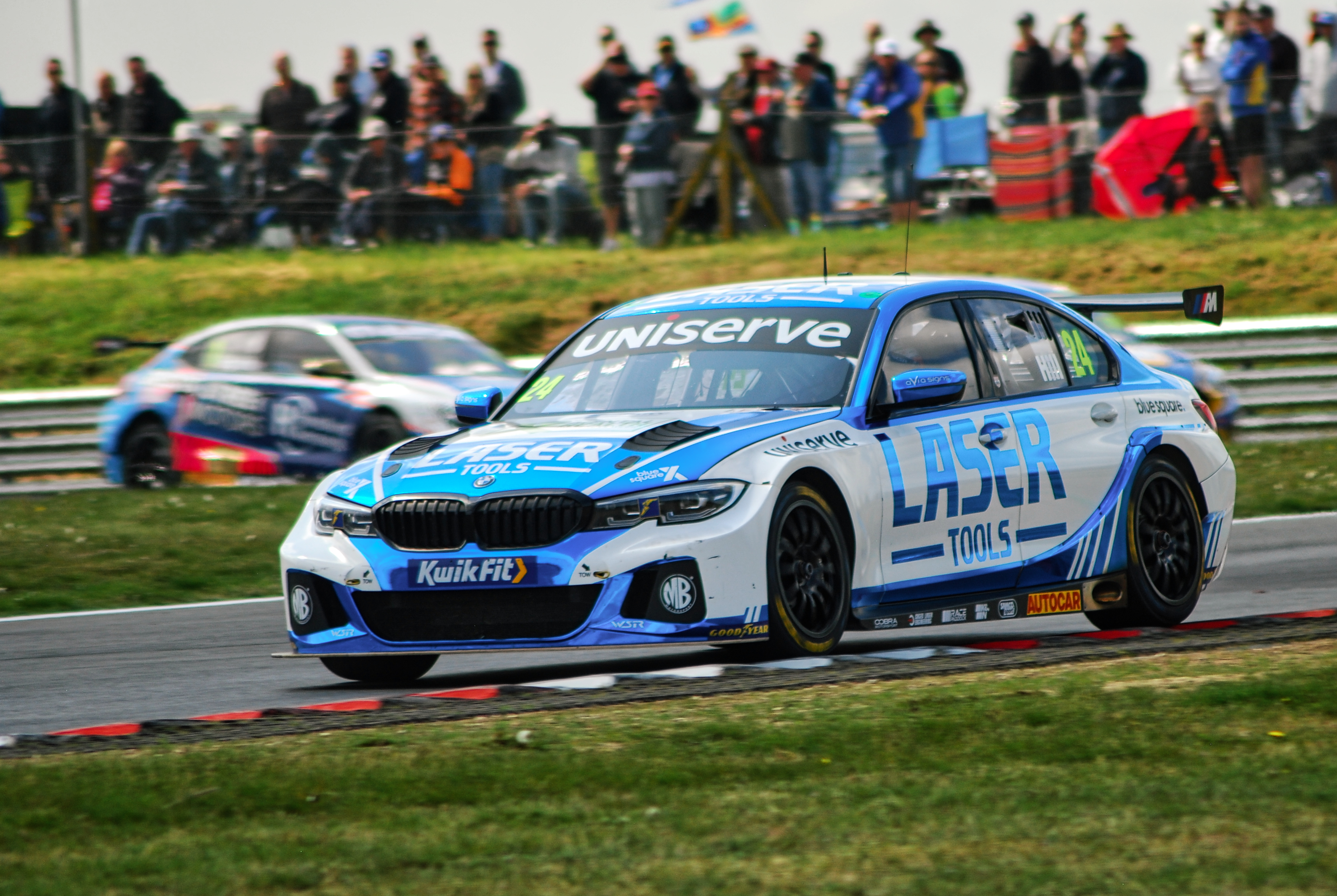
- Hill driving a BMW 330e M Sport at Snetterton Circuit in 2023
- Nationality: (United Kingdom) British
- Born: Jake James Hill; 22 February 1994 (age 32) Tunbridge Wells, England

British Touring Car Championship career
- Debut season: 2013
- Current team: Laser Tools Racing with MB Motorsport
- Categorisation: FIA Silver
- Car number: 24
- Former teams: Motorbase Performance; AmD Tuning; Tony Gilham Racing; Exocet Racing; Addison Lee Motorbase
- Starts: 287 (291 entries)
- Wins: 23
- Podiums: 66
- Poles: 4
- Fastest laps: 14
- Best finish: 1st in 2024

Previous series
- 2008–2010 2011–2012: Ginetta Junior Championship; Ginetta GT Supercup

Championship titles
- 2024: British Touring Car Championship

Awards
- 2022: Goodyear Wingfoot Award

Jake James Hill (born 22 February 1994) is a British racing driver who competes in the 24H Series driving a Ferrari 296 GT3 Evo for Era Motorsport. He previously competed in the British Touring Car Championship, which he won in 2024, driving a BMW 330e M Sport for West Surrey Racing under the Laser Tools Racing with MB Motorsport banner.

== Racing career ==
=== Ginetta Junior Championship ===
After karting as a child, Hill began car racing in 2008, signing with Tollbar Racing to race in the Ginetta Junior Championship Winter Series. Hill finished the series as the top rookie and fourth overall, leading Hill to join the main championship in 2009. Despite not racing the full season, Hill took three wins, five pole positions, five fastest laps and five podiums, leading every race he competed in, a feat that secured him the championship.

The following season saw the debut of the Ginetta G40 in the championship, replacing the previous Ginetta G20. Hill was successful in the 2010 championship, taking a further ten wins, thirteen podiums, eight pole positions and nine fastest laps, finishing second in the championship to Tom Ingram.

=== Ginetta GT Supercup ===
In 2011, Hill made the step up into a Ginetta G50, racing in the Michelin Ginetta GT Supercup. Hill secured four class wins during this season, and 17 podiums in 27 races.

Hill had a partial campaign in 2012, taking a single overall win in the championship and six podiums.

=== British Touring Car Championship ===
In 2013, Hill debuted in the BTCC while substituting for the absent Addison Lee Motorbase driver Liam Griffin in the Croft round of the championship. Hill took a Jack Sears Trophy class win in the first round of the meeting.

Hill joined Rob Austin Racing prior to the final round of the 2013 season at Brands Hatch, replacing Will Bratt and qualifying tenth, scoring points in all three races and out-scoring and out-qualifying his race-winning teammate Rob Austin all weekend.

Hill was a BRDC Rising Star from 2010 to 2018.

In 2016, in Team HARD's Toyota Avensis, Hill scored points on 17 occasions, qualified tenth at Donington Park, 11th at Croft and Silverstone, won the Dunlop #ForeverForward award for most places gained at Oulton Park, finished in the top ten on six occasions and finished sixth overall at Croft. Hill finished fifth at Silverstone.

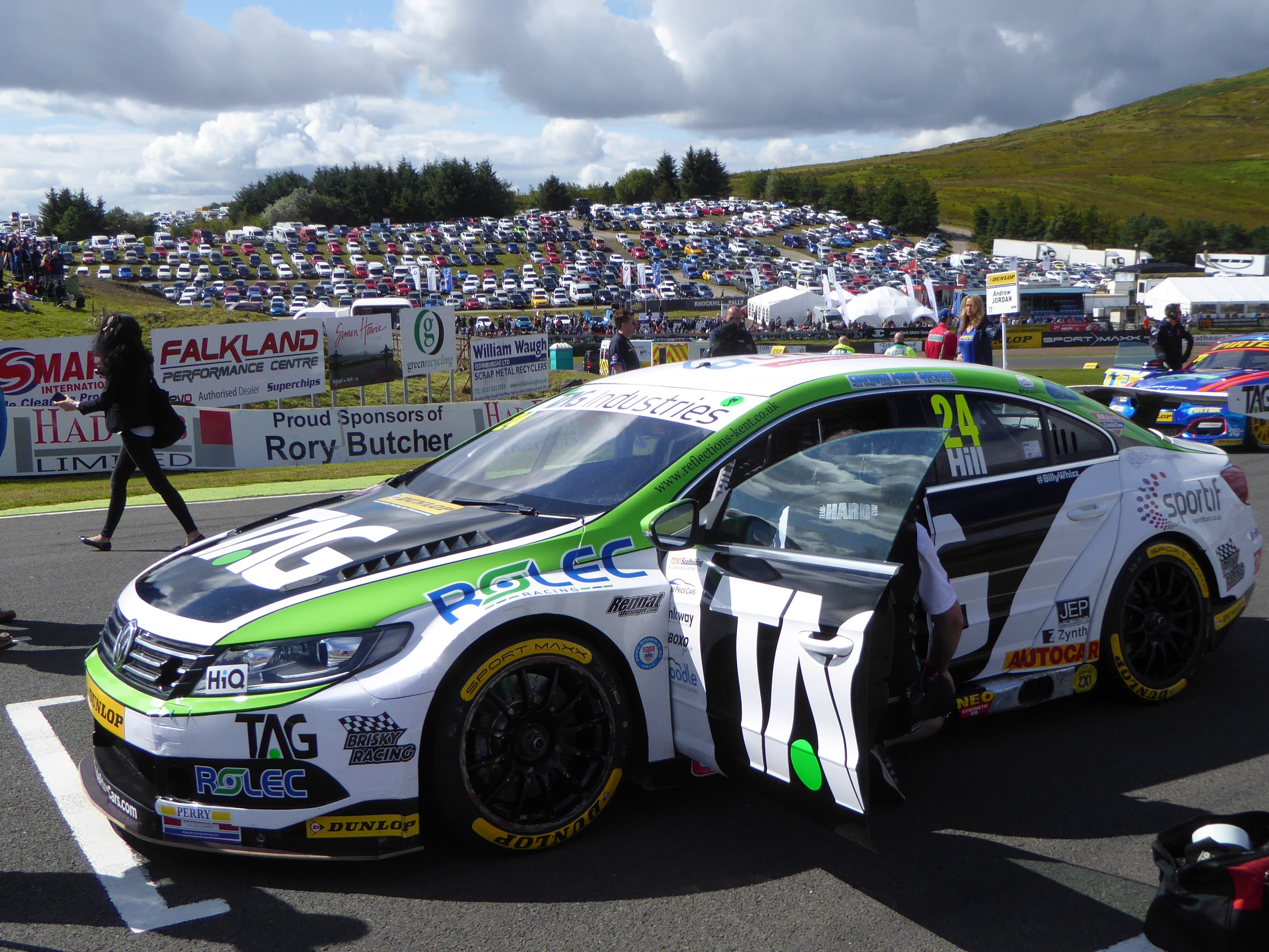
Hill, at the Knockhill round of the 2017 British Touring Car Championship

In 2017, Hill remained with Team Hard, now in a Volkswagen CC, and achieved five top-ten qualifying results.

In 2018, Team HARD expanded to four cars, with Hill now joined by the Renault Clio Cup Champion Mike Bushell, the VW Cup Champion Bobby Thompson and the former British GT Champion Michael Caine. At the opening meeting at Brands Hatch, a charging drive in race two saw Hill score his maiden Dunlop BTCC Podium, finishing second.

2019 started with Hill finishing second in the first race of the year. On 30 June, Hill finished first on the road during the reverse grid race at Oulton Park, but was given a 20-second penalty post-race for an incident with Matt Neal on the third lap. After taking points in the first two races at Knockhill, Alain Menu, the former BTCC champion, drew Hill on pole position for race three. Hill won the first BTCC race for AmD Tuning and Trade Price Cars Racing.

For the 2020 season, Hill switched over to MB Motorsport—formed over the winter by AmD Essex joining forces with ex-F1 driver Mark Blundell—to drive a Honda Civic Type R. Hill achieved six podium finishes through the campaign as he achieved 20 points-scoring finishes in the last 21 races, recovering to finish seventh overall in points despite five technical failures in the first six races.

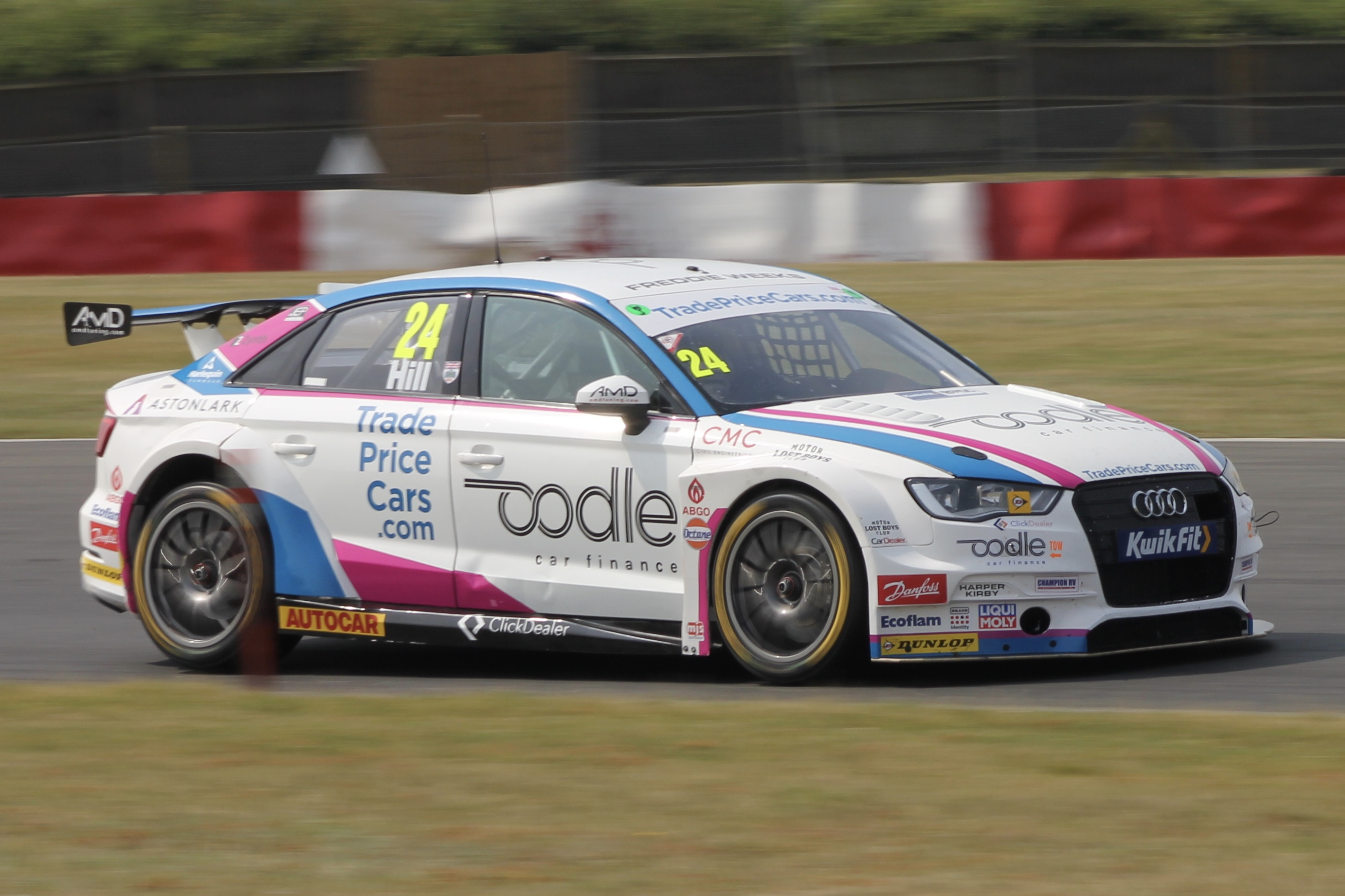
Hill at Snetterton during a BTCC Tyre Test in 2019

In 2021, MB Motorsport joined forces with Motorbase Performance, and Hill was on board for the new 2020 Ford Focus ST with Mountune Power. He achieved three third-place finishes in the opening event at Thruxton, and left the competition as the BTCC Championship points leader. This ended as his best season, fifth in points on 295, 11 points from Colin Turkington in second.

On 22 December 2021, it was announced Hill would join West Surrey Racing as part of MB Motorsport's new venture with Rokit, driving a Hybrid BMW 330e M Sport for the 2022 season.

Hill took his maiden BTCC Pole Position in the opening event of 2022 at Donington Park, finishing third before facing disqualification for failing the ride-height test after sustaining damage. Despite this, Hill won and set a new Lap Record in the final race of the day.

Hill took two further victories at Knockhill and Silverstone. He went into the final round of the year just five points off the Championship lead, ending up third overall, one point behind Ashley Sutton and thirteen behind Tom Ingram.

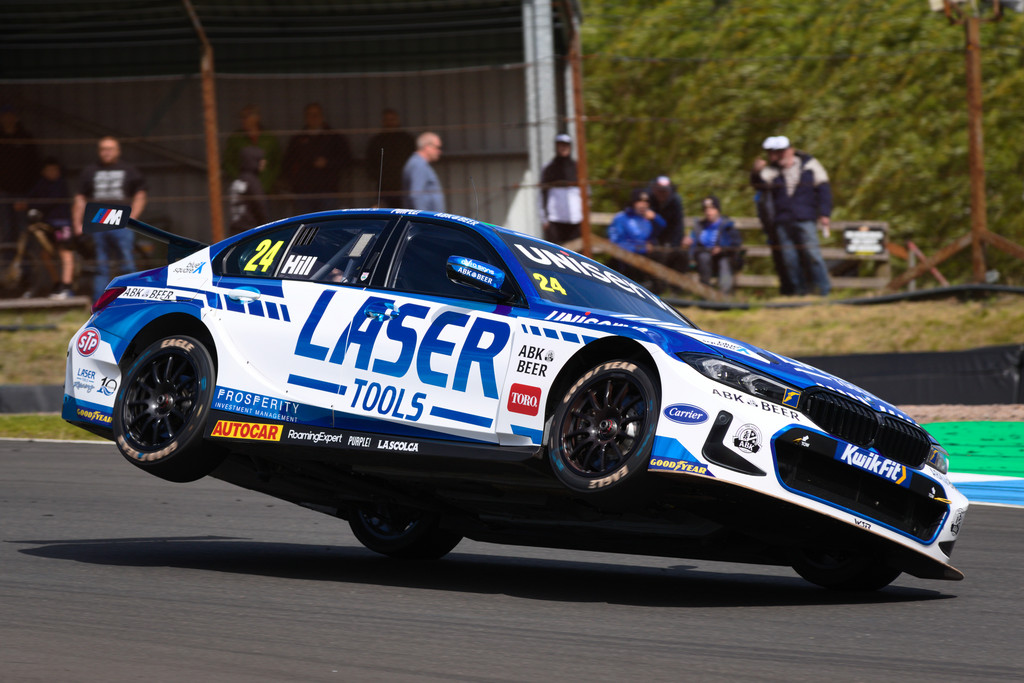
Jake Hill's BMW entering Duffus Dip in 2024

Hill stayed with WSR and MB Motorsport in 2023, renamed Laser Tools MB Motorsport. He was in the Championship fight until Silverstone, taking six wins (including a double win), second place, and all three fastest laps at Oulton Park to score 62 points in a day. He won twice at Knockhill and Silverstone, and won the final race on the Brands Hatch GP circuit after a pass on Josh Cook to take the lead. Hill scored 12 podiums and five fastest laps, finishing third in points.

Hill remained with WSR BMW and Laser Tools MB Motorsport for 2024. Hill won the BTCC championship after finishing the final race in second place.

In 2025, Hill secured three wins, seven podiums, and 15 top five finishes. But during the opening race of the championship, Hill faced car trouble, causing him to finish the race in 19th place. He finished fourth overall, missing the podium by 12 points.

Hill was awarded Autosport's 2025 National Driver of the Year, presented to him on 29 January at the Roundhouse in London by the Mercedes Formula 1 driver Kimi Antonelli.

=== 24H Series ===
In 2025, Hill announced his departure from the British Touring Car Championship. In the 2026 season, he began competing in the 24H Series in the GT3 class. In his first race of the season in Nürburgring, he raced with teammates Kyle Tilley, Patrick Kolb, and Max Hofer. They finished second in the GT3 ProAm class and 11th overall.

== Racing record ==
=== Racing career summary ===
Season	Series	Team	Races	Wins	Poles	F/Laps	Podiums	Points	Position
2008	Ginetta Junior Winter Series	Tollbar	4	0	0	0	1	0	5th
2009	Ginetta Junior Championship	Tollbar Racing with Food Connections	11	3	5	5	5	209	11th
2010	Ginetta Junior Championship	Tollbar	20	10	8	9	13	491	**2nd**
2011	Ginetta GT Supercup - G50	Optimum Motorsport/Poor Boys	26	4	1	4	17	585	4th
2012	Ginetta GT Supercup - G55	Tollbar Racing with WIRED	18	1	0	0	6	375	7th
2013	British Touring Car Championship	Addison Lee Motorbase	3	0	0	0	0	8	23rd
2013	British Touring Car Championship	Exocet Racing	3	0	0	0	0	8	23rd
2014	Porsche Carrera Cup Great Britain	In2Racing	4	0	0	0	2	59	11th
2014	Atom Cup UK	Ariel Atom	4	4	1	2	4	?	?
2015	British Touring Car Championship	AmD Tuning	3	0	0	0	0	0	38th
2015	British GT Championship - GT4	AmDtuning.com	5	0	0	0	1	31.5	17th
2015	Porsche Supercup	In2Racing	1	0	0	0	0	0	NC†
2016	British Touring Car Championship	RCIB Insurance Racing	30	0	0	0	0	83	17th
2017	British Touring Car Championship	TAG Racing	30	0	0	0	0	63	20th
2018	British Touring Car Championship	Trade Price Cars with Brisky Racing	15	0	0	0	1	29	26th
2019	British Touring Car Championship	TradePriceCars.com	29	1	0	1	2	131	15th
2020	British Touring Car Championship	MB Motorsport accelerated by Blue Square	27	0	0	0	6	212	7th
2021	British Touring Car Championship	MB Motorsport accelerated by Blue Square	30	2	0	2	9	295	5th
2022	British Touring Car Championship	ROKiT MB Motorsport	30	3	2	6	13	381	**3rd**
2023	British Touring Car Championship	Laser Tools Racing with MB Motorsport	30	6	0	5	12	330	**3rd**
2024	British Touring Car Championship	Laser Tools Racing with MB Motorsport	30	8	1	1	16	421	**1st**
2025	British Touring Car Championship	Laser Tools Racing with MB Motorsport	27	3	1	0	8	295	4th
2025	Middle East Trophy - GT3	Era Motorsport	2	0	0	0	0	0	16th
2025	24H Series - GT3	Era Motorsport	5	0	0	0	1	87	10th
2026	24H Series - GT3	Era Motorsport	5	0	0	0	0	51	23rd
2026	Nürburgring Langstrecken-Serie - VT2-RWD	SRS Team Sorg Rennsport							
2026	Nürburgring Langstrecken-Serie - Cup3	Lionspeed GP							
2026	24 Hours of Nürburgring – SP9 Pro-Am	Lionspeed GP	1	0	0	0	1	N/A	**2nd**
2026	Nürburgring Langstrecken-Serie - SP9	Lionspeed GP							
2026	Nürburgring Langstrecken-Serie - SP9	PROsport Racing Team Bilstein							
2026	Nürburgring Langstrecken-Serie - SP9	Era Motorsport							

^{†} As Hill was a guest driver, he was ineligible for championship points.

=== Complete British Touring Car Championship results ===
(key) (Races in bold indicate pole position – 1 point awarded just in first race) (Races in italics indicate fastest lap – 1 point awarded all races) (* signifies that driver led race for at least one lap – 1 point given all races)

Year	Team	Car	1	2	3	4	5	6	7	8	9	10	11	12	13	14	15	16	17	18	19	20	21	22	23	24	25	26	27	28	29	30	Pos	Points
2013	Addison Lee Motorbase	Ford Focus ST Mk.II	BRH; 1	BRH; 2	BRH; 3	DON; 1	DON; 2	DON; 3	THR; 1	THR; 2	THR; 3	OUL; 1	OUL; 2	OUL; 3	CRO; 1; 18	CRO; 2; 17	CRO; 3 Ret	SNE; 1	SNE; 2	SNE; 3	KNO; 1	KNO; 2	KNO; 3	ROC; 1	ROC; 2	ROC; 3	SIL; 1	SIL; 2	SIL; 3				23rd	8
2013	Exocet Racing	Audi A4																												BRH; 1; 14	BRH; 2; 11	BRH; 3; 15	23rd	8
2015	AmD Tuning	Audi S3 Saloon	BRH; 1	BRH; 2	BRH; 3	DON; 1	DON; 2	DON; 3	THR; 1	THR; 2	THR; 3	OUL; 1	OUL; 2	OUL; 3	CRO; 1	CRO; 2	CRO; 3	SNE; 1	SNE; 2	SNE; 3	KNO; 1	KNO; 2	KNO; 3	ROC; 1	ROC; 2	ROC; 3	SIL; 1	SIL; 2	SIL; 3	BRH; 1; 17	BRH; 2; 18	BRH; 3 Ret	38th	0
2016	RCIB Insurance Racing	Toyota Avensis	BRH; 1; 13	BRH; 2 Ret	BRH; 3; 23	DON; 1; 26	DON; 2 Ret	DON; 3 Ret	THR; 1; 10	THR; 2; 17	THR; 3; 13	OUL; 1; 13	OUL; 2; 26	OUL; 3; 9	CRO; 1; 6	CRO; 2; 20	CRO; 3; 20	SNE; 1; 12	SNE; 2; 12	SNE; 3; 11	KNO; 1; 16	KNO; 2; 13	KNO; 3; 15	ROC; 1 Ret	ROC; 2; 16	ROC; 3; 8	SIL; 1; 5	SIL; 2; 27	SIL; 3; 14	BRH; 1; 15	BRH; 2; 12	BRH; 3; 8	17th	83
2017	TAG Racing	Volkswagen CC	BRH; 1 NC	BRH; 2; 19	BRH; 3; 10	DON; 1 Ret	DON; 2; 26	DON; 3; 11	THR; 1 Ret	THR; 2; 21	THR; 3; 15	OUL; 1; 10	OUL; 2; 9	OUL; 3; 9	CRO; 1; 12	CRO; 2 Ret	CRO; 3; 19	SNE; 1; 6	SNE; 2; 11	SNE; 3; 7	KNO; 1; 21	KNO; 2 Ret	KNO; 3; 22	ROC; 1; 24	ROC; 2; 17	ROC; 3; 16	SIL; 1 Ret	SIL; 2; 17	SIL; 3 Ret	BRH; 1; 26	BRH; 2; 16	BRH; 3; 10	20th	63
2018	Trade Price Cars with Brisky Racing	Volkswagen CC	BRH; 1; 25	BRH; 2; 2	BRH; 3; 29	DON; 1; 17	DON; 2; 23	DON; 3; 10	THR; 1; 20	THR; 2; 18	THR; 3; 17	OUL; 1; 23	OUL; 2; 21	OUL; 3; 10	CRO; 1 Ret	CRO; 2; 26	CRO; 3; 25	SNE; 1	SNE; 2	SNE; 3	ROC; 1	ROC; 2	ROC; 3	KNO; 1	KNO; 2	KNO; 3	SIL; 1	SIL; 2	SIL; 3	BRH; 1	BRH; 2	BRH; 3	26th	29
2019	TradePriceCars.com	Audi S3 Saloon	BRH; 1; 2	BRH; 2; 4	BRH; 3 Ret	DON; 1 Ret	DON; 2; 9	DON; 3; 6	THR; 1; 10	THR; 2; 12	THR; 3; 18	CRO; 1; 12	CRO; 2 Ret	CRO; 3 DNS	OUL; 1; 13	OUL; 2; 12	**OUL**; **3**; 14*	SNE; 1; 10	SNE; 2; 10	SNE; 3 Ret	THR; 1; 16	THR; 2; 15	THR; 3; 12	KNO; 1; 10	KNO; 2; 10	**KNO**; **3**; 1*	SIL; 1; 16	SIL; 2; 16	SIL; 3; 11	BRH; 1 Ret	BRH; 2; 19	BRH; 3; 12	15th	131
2020	MB Motorsport accelerated by Blue Square	Honda Civic Type R (FK2)	DON; 1 Ret	DON; 2 Ret	DON; 3 NC	BRH; 1; 10	BRH; 2 Ret	BRH; 3 Ret	OUL; 1; 3	OUL; 2; 7	OUL; 3; 7	KNO; 1; 3	KNO; 2; 8	KNO; 3; 5	THR; 1; 22	THR; 2; 11	THR; 3; 9	SIL; 1; 7	SIL; 2; 7	SIL; 3; 15	CRO; 1; 2	CRO; 2; 3	CRO; 3; 7	SNE; 1; 3	SNE; 2; 5	SNE; 3; 9	BRH; 1; 6	BRH; 2; 7	BRH; 3; 3				7th	212
2021	MB Motorsport accelerated by Blue Square	Ford Focus ST	THR; 1; 3	THR; 2; 3	THR; 3; 3*	SNE; 1; 9	SNE; 2; 24	SNE; 3; 12	BRH; 1; 4	BRH; 2; 27	BRH; 3; 13	OUL; 1; 8	OUL; 2; 4	OUL; 3; 7	KNO; 1; 6	KNO; 2; 3	KNO; 3 Ret	THR; 1; 2	THR; 2; 4	THR; 3; 4	CRO; 1; 2	CRO; 2; 1*	CRO; 3; 7	SIL; 1; 21	SIL; 2; 9	SIL; 3; 1*	DON; 1; 17	DON; 2; 9	DON; 3; 2	BRH; 1; 12	BRH; 2; 10	BRH; 3; 4	5th	295
2022	ROKiT MB Motorsport	BMW 330e M Sport	**DON**; **1** DSQ	DON; 2; 9	**DON**; **3**; 1*	BRH; 1; 4	BRH; 2; 7	BRH; 3; 2	THR; 1; 2	THR; 2; 2	THR; 3; 21	OUL; 1; 13	OUL; 2; 7	OUL; 3; 13	CRO; 1; 5	CRO; 2; 4	CRO; 3; 5	**KNO**; **1**; 1*	**KNO**; **2**; 2*	KNO; 3; 2	SNE; 1; 2	SNE; 2; 2	SNE; 3; 5	THR; 1; 4	THR; 2; 4	THR; 3; 12	SIL; 1; 2	SIL; 2; 1*	SIL; 3; 4	BRH; 1; 3	BRH; 2; 2	BRH; 3; 7	3rd	381
2023	Laser Tools Racing with MB Motorsport	BMW 330e M Sport	DON; 1; 2*	DON; 2; 16	DON; 3; 4	BRH; 1; 4	BRH; 2; 4	BRH; 3; 22	SNE; 1; 2	SNE; 2; 2	SNE; 3; 10	THR; 1; 4	THR; 2; 4	THR; 3; 10	OUL; 1; 1*	**OUL**; **2**; 1*	OUL; 3; 2	CRO; 1; 5	CRO; 2; 11	CRO; 3; 7	KNO; 1; 1	**KNO**; **2**; 1*	KNO; 3; 14	DON; 1; 2	DON; 2; 3	DON; 3; 8	SIL; 1; 1*	**SIL**; **2**; 20*	SIL; 3; 8	BRH; 1; 6	BRH; 2; 6	BRH; 3; 1*	3rd	372
2024	Laser Tools Racing with MB Motorsport	BMW 330e M Sport	DON; 1; 3	DON; 2; 3*	DON; 3; 5	BRH; 1; 4	BRH; 2 Ret	BRH; 3; 12	**SNE**; **1**; 1*	**SNE**; **2**; 1*	SNE; 3; 9*	THR; 1; 1*	**THR**; **2**; 1*	THR; 3; 5	OUL; 1; 5	OUL; 2; 3	OUL; 3; 1*	CRO; 1; 6	CRO; 2; 16	CRO; 3; 5	KNO; 1; 5	KNO; 2; 1*	KNO; 3; 5	DON; 1; 3	DON; 2; 3	DON; 3; 5	SIL; 1; 2	SIL; 2; 1*	SIL; 3; 5	BRH; 1; 1*	**BRH**; **2**; 2*	BRH; 3; 2	1st	421
2025	Laser Tools Racing with MB Motorsport	BMW 330i M Sport LCI	DON; 1; 4	DON; 2; 4	DON; 3; 10	**BRH**; **1**; 1*	**BRH**; **2**; 8*	BRH; 3; 2	SNE; 1 NC	SNE; 2; 11	SNE; 3; 9	THR; 1; 6	THR; 2; 5	THR; 3; 18*	OUL; 1; 7	OUL; 2; 5	OUL; 3; 7	CRO; 1 WD	CRO; 2 WD	CRO; 3 WD	KNO; 1; 1*	**KNO**; **2**; 5*	KNO; 3; 1*	DON; 1; 6	DON; 2; 9	DON; 3; 5	SIL; 1; 2	SIL; 2; 3*	SIL; 3; 4	BRH; 1; 19	BRH; 2; 7	BRH; 3; 3	4th	295

=== Complete British GT Championship results ===
(key) (Races in bold indicate pole position) (Races in italics indicate fastest lap)

Year	Team	Car	Class	1	2	3	4	5	6	7	8	9	DC	Points
2015	AmDtuning.com	Porsche 997 GT4	GT4	OUL; 1	OUL; 2	ROC; 1; 19	SIL; 1; 20	SPA; 1; 16	BRH; 1; 22	SNE; 1	SNE; 2	DON; 1; 23	17th	31.5
2023	Century Motorsport	BMW M4 GT3	GT3	OUL; 1	OUL; 2	SIL; 1	DON; 1 WD	SNE; 1	SNE; 2	ALG; 1	BRH; 1	DON; 1	NC	0

Sporting positions
Preceded by Ashley Sutton	British Touring Car Championship; Champion; 2024	Succeeded by Tom Ingram
Awards and achievements
Preceded by Colin Turkington	Goodyear Wingfoot Award; Winner; 2022	Succeeded by Ashley Sutton
