= Daniel Lloyd (racing driver) =

British racing driver (born 1992)

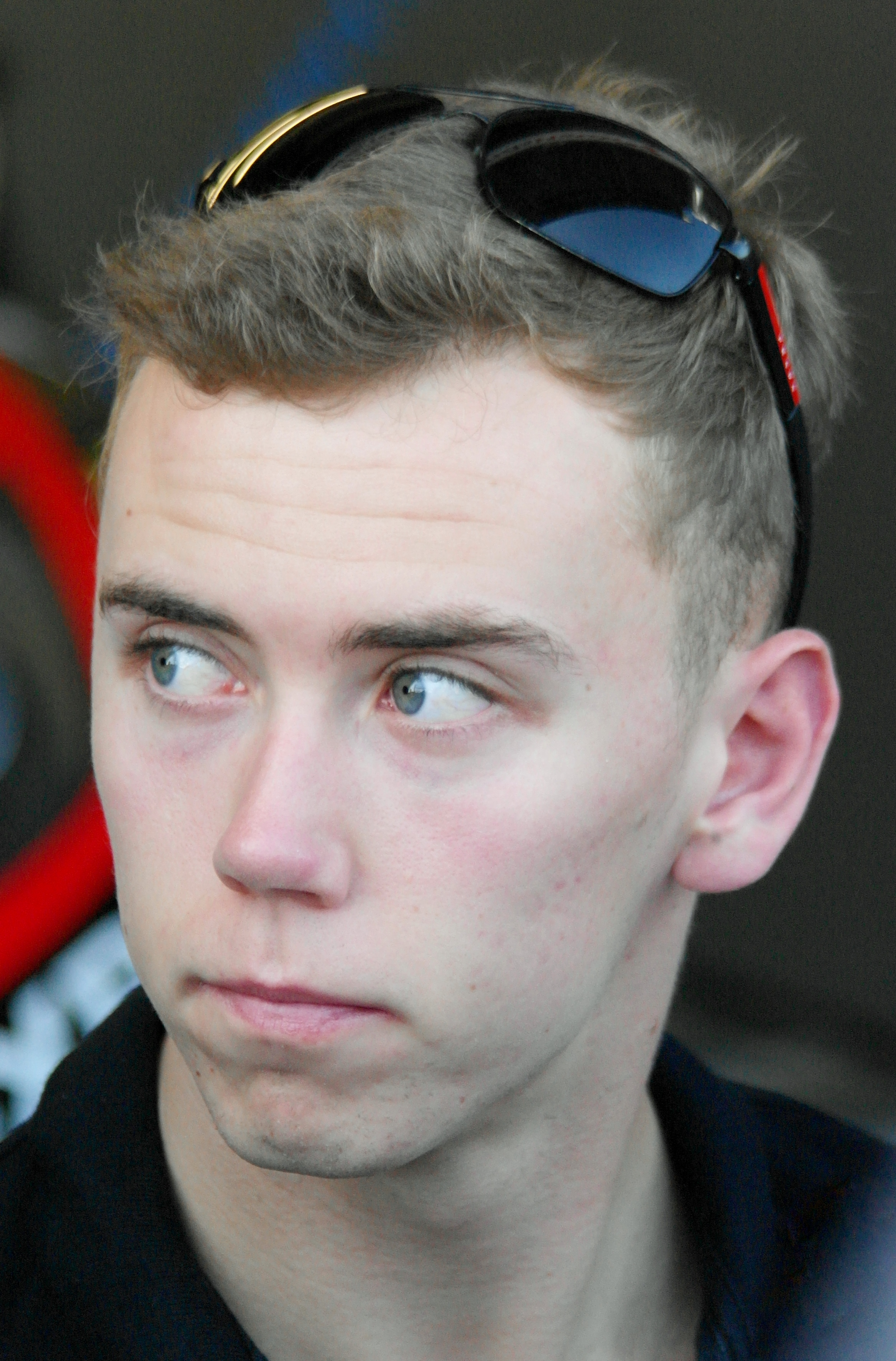
- Lloyd at the Brands Hatch round of the 2014 Blancpain Sprint Series season.
- Nationality: (United Kingdom) British
- Born: Daniel Woodhouse Lloyd; 4 March 1992 (age 34) Huddersfield, UK

British Touring Car Championship career
- Debut season: 2010
- Current team: Restart Racing
- Categorisation: FIA Silver
- Car number: 123
- Former teams: EXCELR8 Motorsport; Power Maxed Racing; BTC Racing; Triple Eight Racing; Eurotech Racing
- Starts: 175 (177 entries)
- Wins: 5
- Poles: 0
- Fastest laps: 4
- Best finish: 10th in 2022

Previous series
- 2011 2010 2009 2009 2008: Volkswagen Scirocco R-Cup; Skip Barber National; Renault Clio Winter Cup; Renault Clio Cup; Ginetta Junior Championship

Championship titles
- 2025 2018 2009: BTCC Independents' Trophy; TCR UK Touring Car Championship; Renault Clio Winter Cup

Daniel Woodhouse Lloyd (born 4 March 1992) is a British racing driver who currently competes in the British Touring Car Championship for Restart Racing. He is the reigning 2025 Independents' Trophy champion. He was also the 2009 Renault Clio UK Winter Cup champion.

Lloyd was born in Huddersfield. After competing in the Skip Barber National Championship in the first half of 2010, he made his début in the British Touring Car Championship at Croft. In 2011, he raced in the Volkswagen Scirocco R-Cup, qualifying on pole in his debut race and eventually scored two victories and finished third in the championship.

For 2012, Lloyd raced in the Porsche Carrera Cup Great Britain series with Team Parker Racing and scored his first victory in round 6 in the monsoon conditions at Thruxton, just beating rival Glynn Geddie.

Lloyd was the inaugural TCR UK champion, taking the title in a Volkswagen Golf run by WestCoast Racing.

== Racing record ==
=== Complete British Touring Car Championship results ===
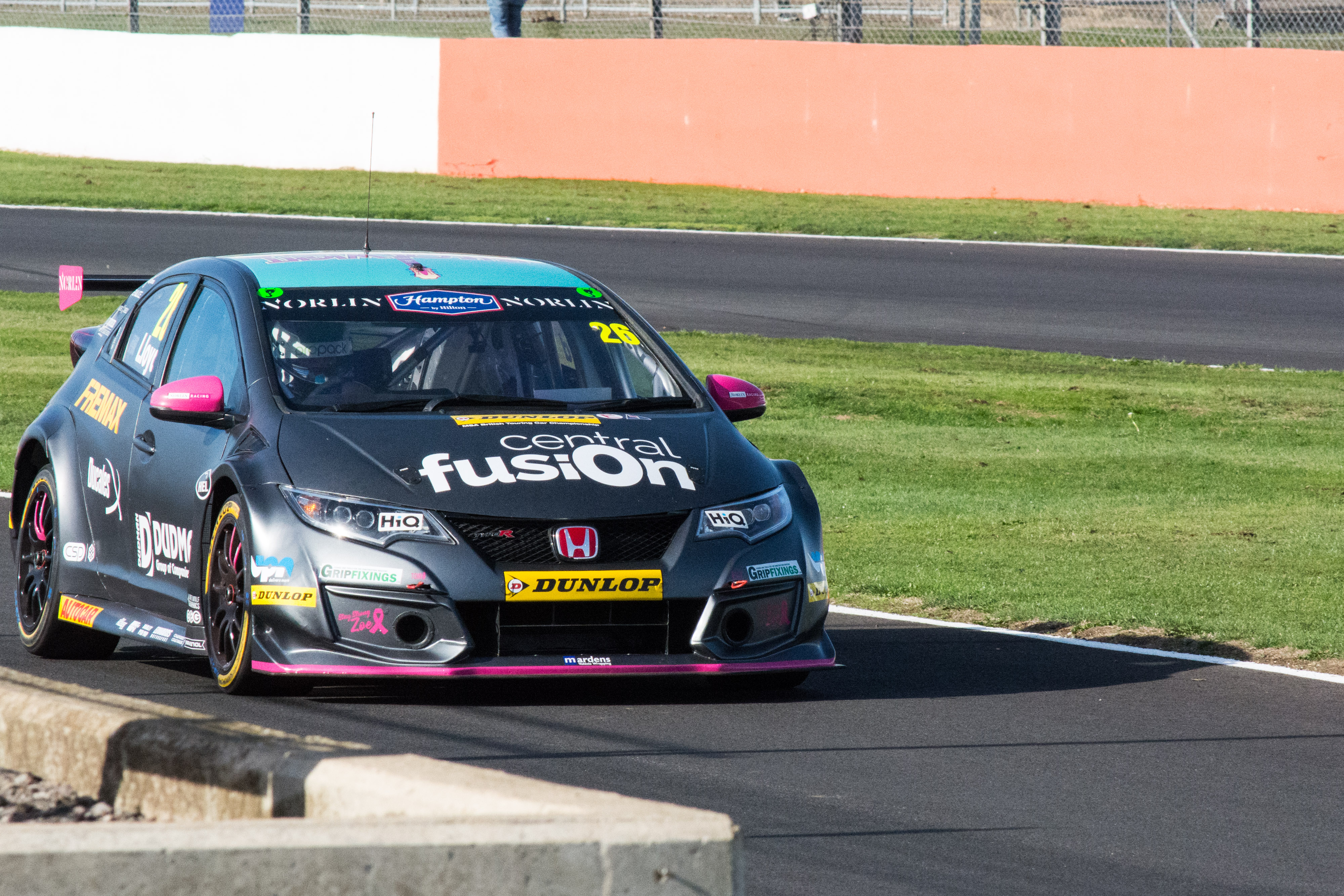
Lloyd driving the BTC Racing Honda Civic at Silverstone during the 2018 British Touring Car Championship season.

(key) (Races in bold indicate pole position – 1 point awarded just in first race; races in italics indicate fastest lap – 1 point awarded all races; * signifies that driver led race for at least one lap – 1 point given all races)

Year	Team	Car	1	2	3	4	5	6	7	8	9	10	11	12	13	14	15	16	17	18	19	20	21	22	23	24	25	26	27	28	29	30	DC	Points
2010	Uniq Racing with Triple Eight	Vauxhall Vectra	THR; 1	THR; 2	THR; 3	ROC; 1	ROC; 2	ROC; 3	BRH; 1	BRH; 2	BRH; 3	OUL; 1	OUL; 2	OUL; 3	CRO; 1; 7	CRO; 2; 14	CRO; 3; 8	SNE; 1	SNE; 2	SNE; 3	SIL; 1	SIL; 2	SIL; 3	KNO; 1	KNO; 2	KNO; 3	DON; 1	DON; 2	DON; 3	BRH; 1	BRH; 2	BRH; 3	17th	7
2016	Eurotech Racing	Honda Civic Type R	BRH; 1	BRH; 2	BRH; 3	DON; 1	DON; 2	DON; 3	THR; 1; 12	THR; 2; 7	THR; 3; 9	OUL; 1; 6	OUL; 2; 13	OUL; 3 Ret	CRO; 1 Ret	CRO; 2; 23	CRO; 3; 13	SNE; 1	SNE; 2	SNE; 3	KNO; 1	KNO; 2	KNO; 3	ROC; 1	ROC; 2	ROC; 3	SIL; 1	SIL; 2	SIL; 3	BRH; 1	BRH; 2	BRH; 3	20th	36
2017	MG RCIB Insurance Racing	MG 6 GT	BRH; 1; 23	BRH; 2; 23	BRH; 3; 15	DON; 1 Ret	DON; 2; 21	DON; 3 Ret	THR; 1; 21	THR; 2 Ret	THR; 3 Ret	OUL; 1; 20	OUL; 2; 22	OUL; 3; 12	CRO; 1	CRO; 2	CRO; 3	SNE; 1	SNE; 2	SNE; 3	KNO; 1	KNO; 2	KNO; 3	ROC; 1	ROC; 2	ROC; 3	SIL; 1	SIL; 2	SIL; 3	BRH; 1	BRH; 2	BRH; 3	33rd	6
2018	BTC Norlin Racing	Honda Civic Type R	BRH; 1	BRH; 2	BRH; 3	DON; 1	DON; 2	DON; 3	THR; 1	THR; 2	THR; 3	OUL; 1; 25	OUL; 2; 17	OUL; 3 Ret	CRO; 1; 8	CRO; 2; 9	**CRO**; **3**; 1*	SNE; 1; 9	SNE; 2; 15	SNE; 3; 9	ROC; 1; 21	ROC; 2; 16	ROC; 3 Ret	KNO; 1; 25	KNO; 2; 14	KNO; 3; 10	SIL; 1; 16	SIL; 2; 19	SIL; 3; 15	BRH; 1; 6	BRH; 2; 13	BRH; 3; 10	18th	87
2021	Adrian Flux with Power Maxed Racing	Vauxhall Astra	THR; 1; 16	THR; 2; 14	THR; 3; 5	SNE; 1; 7	SNE; 2; 12	SNE; 3; 13	BRH; 1; 11	BRH; 2; 6	BRH; 3; 9	OUL; 1; 13	OUL; 2; 21	OUL; 3; 11	KNO; 1 Ret	KNO; 2; 26	KNO; 3; 18	THR; 1; 11	THR; 2; 10	THR; 3; 11	CRO; 1; 9	CRO; 2; 18	CRO; 3 Ret	SIL; 1; 3	SIL; 2; 11	**SIL**; **3**; 2*	DON; 1; 2	DON; 2; 5	DON; 3; 7	BRH; 1; 4	BRH; 2; 2	BRH; 3; 13	11th	190
2022	Bristol Street Motors with Excelr8 TradePriceCars.com	Hyundai i30 Fastback N Performance	DON; 1; 11	DON; 2; 8	DON; 3; 4	BRH; 1; 15	BRH; 2; 8	BRH; 3; 9	THR; 1; 8	THR; 2; 9	THR; 3; 7	OUL; 1; 7	OUL; 2; 8	OUL; 3 Ret	CRO; 1; 1*	**CRO**; **2**; 1*	CRO; 3; 11	KNO; 1; 19	KNO; 2; 22	KNO; 3; 18	SNE; 1; 12	SNE; 2; 11	SNE; 3; 12	THR; 1; 17	THR; 2; 13	THR; 3; 11	SIL; 1; 12	SIL; 2; 15	SIL; 3; 11	BRH; 1; 13	BRH; 2; 10	**BRH**; **3**; 1*	10th	192
2023	Autobrite Direct with Millers Oils	Cupra León	DON; 1; 19	DON; 2; 13	DON; 3; 18	BRH; 1; 10	BRH; 2; 14	BRH; 3; 11	SNE; 1; 15	SNE; 2; 10	SNE; 3; 17	THR; 1 NC	THR; 2; 21	THR; 3; 18	OUL; 1; 11	OUL; 2; 8	OUL; 3; 23	CRO; 1; 12	CRO; 2; 9	CRO; 3 Ret	KNO; 1; 10	KNO; 2; 5	KNO; 3; 8	DON; 1; 17	DON; 2; 12	**DON**; **3** Ret*	SIL; 1; 10	SIL; 2; 9	SIL; 3; 11	BRH; 1; 15	BRH; 2; 10	BRH; 3; 7	13th	111
2025	Restart Racing	Hyundai i30 Fastback N Performance	DON; 1; 12	DON; 2 Ret	DON; 3 Ret	BRH; 1; 9	BRH; 2; 21	BRH; 3; 22	SNE; 1; 5	SNE; 2; 4	SNE; 3; 16	THR; 1; 13	THR; 2; 10	THR; 3; 9	OUL; 1; 12	OUL; 2 Ret	OUL; 3; 13	CRO; 1; 9	CRO; 2; 15	CRO; 3 Ret	KNO; 1; 16	KNO; 2; 15	KNO; 3; 12	DON; 1; 14	DON; 2; 10	DON; 3; 8	SIL; 1; 1*	**SIL**; **2**; 6	SIL; 3; 17	BRH; 1; 8	BRH; 2; 15	BRH; 3; 17	15th	128
2026	Restart Racing	Hyundai i30 Fastback N Performance	DON; 1	DON; 2	DON; 3	BRH; 1	BRH; 2	BRH; 3	SNE; 1	SNE; 2	SNE; 3	OUL; 1	OUL; 2	OUL; 3	THR; 1	THR; 2	THR; 3	KNO; 1	KNO; 2	KNO; 3	DON; 1; 14	DON; 2 Ret	DON; 3 DNS	CRO; 1; 12^{10}	CRO; 2; 7	CRO; 3; 7	SIL; 1; 14^{5}	SIL; 2 DNS	SIL; 3; 16	BRH; 1; 10	BRH; 2; 17	BRH; 3; 7	20th	40

=== Complete Blancpain Sprint Series results ===
Year	Team	Car	Class	1	2	3	4	5	6	7	8	9	10	11	12	13	14	Pos.	Points
2014	Bhaitech	McLaren MP4-12C GT3	Pro	NOG; QR; 16	NOG; CR; 14	BRH; QR; 10	BRH; CR; 12	ZAN; QR; 7	ZAN; CR; 15	SVK; QR	SVK; CR	ALG; QR	ALG; CR	ZOL; QR	ZOL; CR	BAK; QR	BAK; CR	NC	0

=== Complete TCR International Series results ===
(key) (Races in bold indicate pole position) (Races in italics indicate fastest lap)

Year	Team	Car	1	2	3	4	5	6	7	8	9	10	11	12	13	14	15	16	17	18	19	20	DC	Points
2017	Lukoil Craft-Bamboo Racing	SEAT León TCR	RIM; 1	RIM; 2	BHR; 1	BHR; 2	SPA; 1	SPA; 2	MNZ; 1	MNZ; 2	SAL; 1; 11	SAL; 2; 7	HUN; 1; 6	HUN; 2 Ret	OSC; 1; 2	OSC; 2; 4	CHA; 1; 9	CHA; 2; 11	ZHE; 1 Ret	ZHE; 2 DNS	DUB; 1 Ret	DUB; 2 DNS	15th	50

=== Complete TCR UK Touring Car Championship results ===
(key) (Races in bold indicate pole position) (Races in italics indicate fastest lap)

Year	Team	Car	1	2	3	4	5	6	7	8	9	10	11	12	13	14	DC	Points
2018	WestCoast Racing	Volkswagen Golf GTI TCR	**SIL**; **1**; 1	SIL; 2; 1	**KNO**; **1**; 1	KNO; 2; 1	**BHI**; **1**; 1	BHI; 2; 1	CAS; 1; 2	CAS; 2; 1	OUL; 1; 2	OUL; 2; 4	CRO; 1; 3	CRO; 2 Ret	**DON**; **1**; 1	DON; 2; 3	1st	514

=== Complete TCR Europe Touring Car Series results ===
(key) (Races in bold indicate pole position) (Races in italics indicate fastest lap)

Year	Team	Car	1	2	3	4	5	6	7	8	9	10	11	12	13	14	DC	Points
2019	Brutal Fish Racing Team	Honda Civic Type R TCR (FK8)	HUN; 1	HUN; 2	HOC; 1 Ret	HOC; 2; 13	SPA; 1; 11	SPA; 2; 11	RBR; 1; 3	RBR; 2; 16	OSC; 1; 1	OSC; 2 Ret	CAT; 1; 8	CAT; 2; 1	MNZ; 1 Ret	MNZ; 2; 3	10th	183
2020	Brutal Fish Racing Team	Honda Civic Type R TCR (FK8)	LEC; 1; 1^{3}	LEC; 2; 6	ZOL; 1; 5^{10}	ZOL; 2; 2	MNZ; 1; 2^{2}	MNZ; 2 Ret	CAT; 1; 16	CAT; 2; 16	SPA; 1; 8^{5}	SPA; 2 Ret	JAR; 1; 9	JAR; 2; 12			5th	214

=== Complete TCR China Touring Car Championship results ===
(key) (Races in bold indicate pole position) (Races in italics indicate fastest lap)

Year	Team	Car	1	2	3	4	5	6	7	8	9	10	DC	Points
2019	Dongfeng Honda MacPro Racing Team	Honda Civic Type-R TCR (FK8)	**ZHU**; **1**; 3	ZHU; 2; 7	SHA; 1; 1	SHA; 2; 3	**SHA**; **1** DSQ	ZHU; 2; 6	ZHU; 1; 2	ZHU; 2 Ret	ZHZ; 1; 2	ZHZ; 2; 1	2nd	140

=== Complete TCR Malaysia Touring Car Championship results ===
(key) (Races in bold indicate pole position) (Races in italics indicate fastest lap)

Year	Team	Car	1	2	3	4	5	6	DC	Points
2020	Brutal Fish Racing Team	Honda Civic Type R TCR (FK8)	SEP1; 1; 2	SEP1; 2; 2	**SEP2**; **1**; 2	SEP2; 2; 1	SEP3; 1; 2	SEP3; 2; 4	2nd	141

Sporting positions
Preceded by Inaugural	TCR UK; Touring Car Championship; Champion; 2018	Succeeded by James Turkington
Preceded by Árón Taylor-Smith	British Touring Car Championship; Independents' Trophy Winner; 2025	Succeeded by Mikey Doble
