= 2023 British Touring Car Championship =

66th season of the British Touring Car Championship

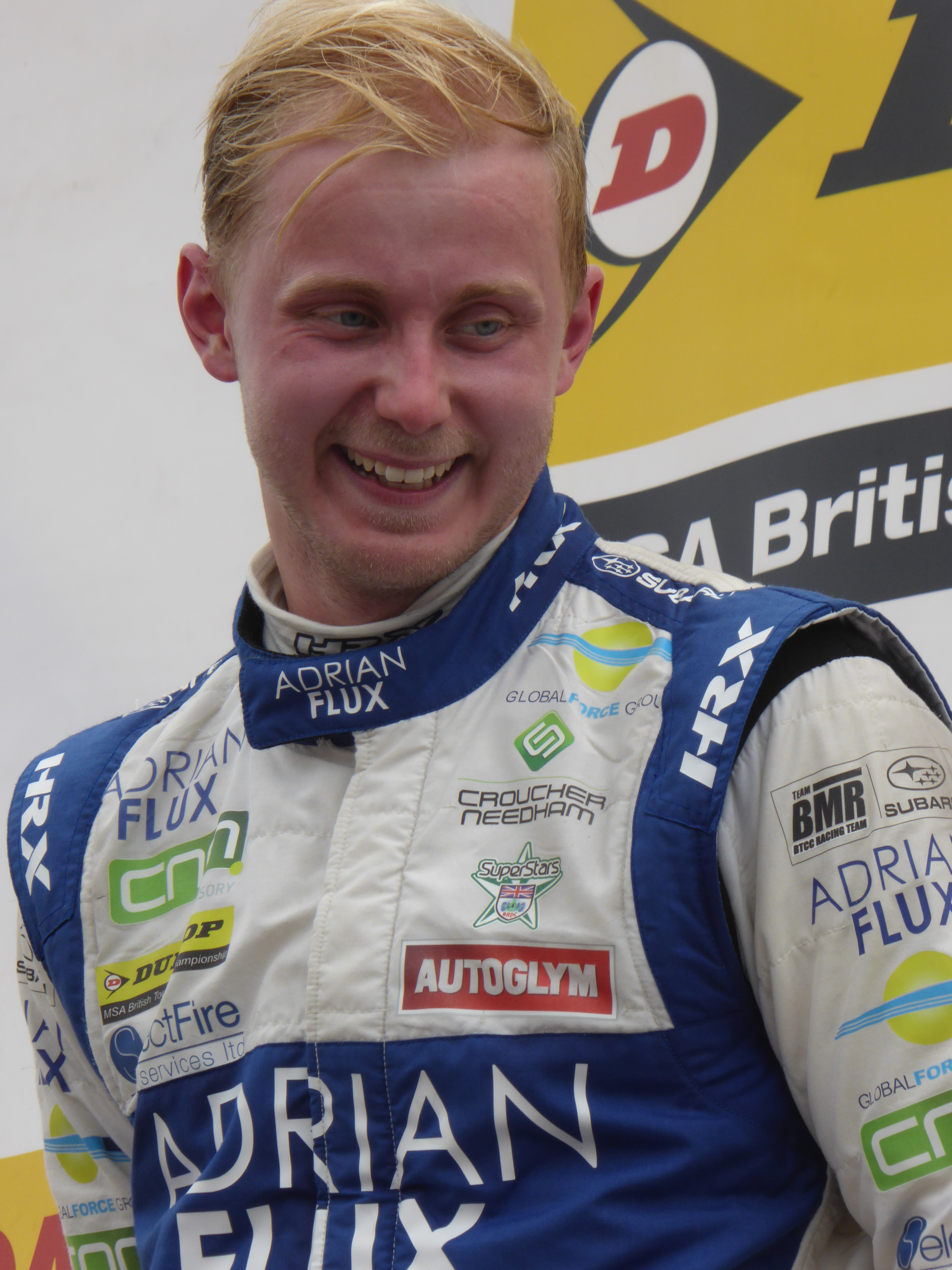
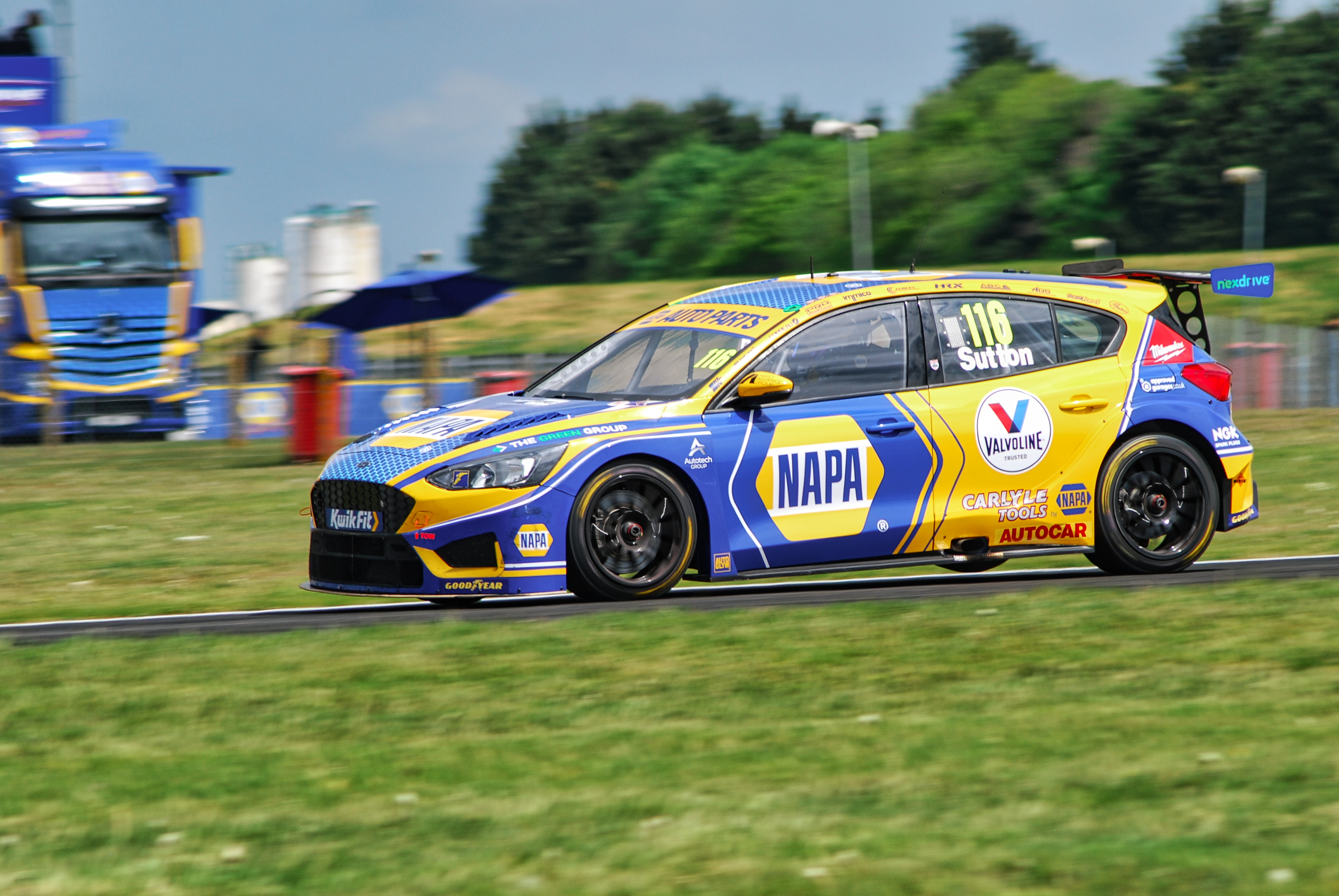
Ashley Sutton (left) and his team NAPA Racing UK (right) won the Drivers' and Teams' Championship, respectively.

The 2023 Kwik Fit British Touring Car Championship (commonly abbreviated as BTCC) was a motor racing championship for production-based touring cars held across England and Scotland. The championship featured a mix of professional motor racing teams and privately funded amateur drivers competing in highly modified versions of family cars which are sold to the general public and conform to the technical regulations for the championship. The 2023 season was the 66th British Touring Car Championship season and the 13th season for cars conforming to the Next Generation Touring Car (NGTC) technical specification.

== Teams and drivers ==
Team	Car	Engine	No.	Drivers	Rounds
Constructor Entries
Bristol Street Motors with EXCELR8	Hyundai i30 Fastback N Performance	Hyundai/Swindon	1	(United Kingdom) Tom Ingram	All
Bristol Street Motors with EXCELR8	Hyundai i30 Fastback N Performance	Hyundai/Swindon	3	(United Kingdom) Tom Chilton	All
Bristol Street Motors with EXCELR8	Hyundai i30 Fastback N Performance	Hyundai/Swindon	14	(United Kingdom) Ronan Pearson	All
Bristol Street Motors with EXCELR8	Hyundai i30 Fastback N Performance	Hyundai/Swindon	22	(United Kingdom) Nick Halstead	All
Team BMW	BMW 330e M Sport	BMW/Neil Brown	4	(United Kingdom) Colin Turkington	All
Team BMW	BMW 330e M Sport	BMW/Neil Brown	12	(United Kingdom) Stephen Jelley	All
Team BMW	BMW 330e M Sport	BMW/Neil Brown	33	(United Kingdom) Adam Morgan	All
Laser Tools Racing with MB Motorsport	BMW 330e M Sport	BMW/Neil Brown	24	(United Kingdom) Jake Hill	All
Toyota Gazoo Racing UK	Toyota Corolla GR Sport	Toyota/Neil Brown	6	(United Kingdom) Rory Butcher	All
Toyota Gazoo Racing UK	Toyota Corolla GR Sport	Toyota/Neil Brown	37	(United Kingdom) Ricky Collard	All
Toyota Gazoo Racing UK	Toyota Corolla GR Sport	Toyota/Neil Brown	42	(United Kingdom) George Gamble	All
NAPA Racing UK	Ford Focus ST	Ford/Mountune	27	(United Kingdom) Dan Cammish	All
NAPA Racing UK	Ford Focus ST	Ford/Mountune	32	(United Kingdom) Daniel Rowbottom	All
NAPA Racing UK	Ford Focus ST	Ford/Mountune	77	(United Kingdom) Sam Osborne	All
NAPA Racing UK	Ford Focus ST	Ford/Mountune	116	(United Kingdom) Ashley Sutton	All
Independent Entries
CarStore Power Maxed Racing	Vauxhall Astra	TOCA/M-Sport	11	(United Kingdom) Andrew Watson	All
CarStore Power Maxed Racing	Vauxhall Astra	TOCA/M-Sport	40	(Republic of Ireland) Árón Taylor-Smith	All
CarStore Power Maxed Racing	Vauxhall Astra	TOCA/M-Sport	88	(United Kingdom) Mikey Doble	All
One Motorsport with Starline Racing	Honda Civic Type R	Honda/Neil Brown	16	(United Kingdom) Aiden Moffat	All
One Motorsport with Starline Racing	Honda Civic Type R	Honda/Neil Brown	66	(United Kingdom) Josh Cook	All
One Motorsport with Starline Racing	Honda Civic Type R	Honda/Neil Brown	70	(United Kingdom) Will Powell	1–5
One Motorsport with Starline Racing	Honda Civic Type R	Honda/Neil Brown	99	(United Kingdom) Jade Edwards	6–10
Re.Beverages and Bartercard with Team HARD.	Cupra León	TOCA/M-Sport	99	(United Kingdom) Jade Edwards	1–5
Re.Beverages and Bartercard with Team HARD.	Cupra León	TOCA/M-Sport	17	(United Kingdom) Dexter Patterson	All
Re.Beverages and Bartercard with Team HARD.	Cupra León	TOCA/M-Sport	18	(Philippines) Daryl De Leon	6–10
Autobrite Direct with Millers Oils	Cupra León	TOCA/M-Sport	123	(United Kingdom) Daniel Lloyd	All
Autobrite Direct with Millers Oils	Cupra León	TOCA/M-Sport	777	(United Kingdom) Michael Crees	6–10
Autobrite Direct with Millers Oils	Cupra León	TOCA/M-Sport	19	(United Kingdom) Bobby Thompson	1–5
Go-Fix with Autoaid Breakdown	Cupra León	TOCA/M-Sport	19	(United Kingdom) Bobby Thompson	9–10
Go-Fix with Autoaid Breakdown	Cupra León	TOCA/M-Sport	28	(United Kingdom) Nicolas Hamilton	1–6
Go-Fix with Autoaid Breakdown	Cupra León	TOCA/M-Sport	79	(United Kingdom) Rob Huff	7
Go-Fix with Autoaid Breakdown	Cupra León	TOCA/M-Sport	96	(United Kingdom) Jack Butel	1–9
Go-Fix with Autoaid Breakdown	Cupra León	TOCA/M-Sport	180	(United Kingdom) James Gornall	10

Key
Eligible for the Jack Sears Trophy for drivers yet to record an overall podium finish or Jack Sears Trophy championship at the start of the season.
Entry List

Entering/re-entering BTCC

- Nick Halstead returned to the series with Bristol Street Motors with Excelr8 TradePriceCars.com, having last raced in 2021 at Croft to replace Rick Parfitt Jr.
- Andrew Watson debuted with CarStore Power Maxed Racing.
- Ronan Pearson debuted with Bristol Street Motors with Excelr8 TradePriceCars.com, replacing Jack Butel.
- 2022 Ginetta GT5 and BMW Compact Cup winner Mikey Doble debuted with Power Maxed Racing.

Changed teams

- Adam Morgan moved from Car Gods with Ciceley Motorsport to Team BMW.
- Dexter Patterson moved from Laser Tools Racing to Re.Beverages and Bartercard with Team HARD.
- Dan Lloyd and Jack Butel both moved from Bristol Street Motors with Excelr8 TradePriceCars.com to Autobrite Direct with Millers Oils.
- Aiden Moffat moved from Laser Tools Racing to One Motorsport with Starline Racing.
- Daniel Rowbottom moved from Halfords Racing with Cataclean to NAPA Racing UK with Cataclean.
- Árón Taylor-Smith moved from Yazoo with Safuu.com Racing to CarStore Power Maxed Racing.
- George Gamble moved from Car Gods with Ciceley Motorsport to Toyota Gazoo Racing.
- Jade Edwards moved from Rich Energy BTC Racing to Re.Beverages and Bartercard with Team HARD.
- Will Powell moved from Autobrite Direct with Journey Hero to One Motorsport with Starline Racing.

Leaving BTCC

- Jason Plato retired from the series.
- Ollie Jackson left the series to compete in the 2023 Porsche Carrera Cup Great Britain.
- Gordon Shedden was left without a drive following the departure of Team Dynamics from the series.
- Ash Hand did not return following his debut season with Power Maxed Racing.

Team changes

- Ciceley Motorsport left the series.
- Laser Tools Racing switched from Aiden Moffat Racing to MB Motorsport.
- BTC Racing rebranded ahead of this season to One Motorsport with Starline Racing.
- Team Dynamics announced they would be taking a hiatus from the BTCC grid in 2023 with the hopes of returning to the championship in the future, but would provide support for the One Motorsport team during the season.

Mid-Season Changes

- Will Powell was dismissed from One Motorsport during the summer break and was replaced by Jade Edwards who rejoined the team after spending the first half of the season at Team HARD.
- Daryl DeLeon made his BTCC debut at Croft, replacing Jade Edwards who joined One Motorsport.
- Bobby Thompson was forced to step down from his seat following the fifth round due to financial issues, and was replaced by Michael Crees who rejoined the team he previously raced for in 2019.
- Nicolas Hamilton stepped down from his seat following the sixth round and was replaced by Rob Huff for the seventh round, and then Bobby Thompson for the final two.
- Rob Huff returned to the series for one round at Knockhill.
- Bobby Thompson returned to Team HARD for the final two rounds after regaining sufficient financial backing.
- James Gornall returned to the series for the final round driving for Go-Fix with Autoaid Breakdown, replacing Jack Butel.

== Race calendar ==
The 2023 calendar was announced on 31 May 2022. The Grand Prix layout of Donington Park returned to the calendar for the first time since 2002, taking the place of the second Thruxton round.

2023 BTCC Race Locations

Round		Circuit	Date
1	R1	Donington Park (National Circuit, Leicestershire)	22–23 April
1	R2	Donington Park (National Circuit, Leicestershire)	22–23 April
1	R3	Donington Park (National Circuit, Leicestershire)	22–23 April
2	R4	Brands Hatch (Indy Circuit, Kent)	6–7 May
2	R5	Brands Hatch (Indy Circuit, Kent)	6–7 May
2	R6	Brands Hatch (Indy Circuit, Kent)	6–7 May
3	R7	Snetterton Motor Racing Circuit (300 Circuit, Norfolk)	20–21 May
3	R8	Snetterton Motor Racing Circuit (300 Circuit, Norfolk)	20–21 May
3	R9	Snetterton Motor Racing Circuit (300 Circuit, Norfolk)	20–21 May
4	R10	Thruxton Circuit (Hampshire)	3–4 June
4	R11	Thruxton Circuit (Hampshire)	3–4 June
4	R12	Thruxton Circuit (Hampshire)	3–4 June
5	R13	Oulton Park (Island Circuit, Cheshire)	17–18 June
5	R14	Oulton Park (Island Circuit, Cheshire)	17–18 June
5	R15	Oulton Park (Island Circuit, Cheshire)	17–18 June
6	R16	Croft Circuit (North Yorkshire)	29–30 July
6	R17	Croft Circuit (North Yorkshire)	29–30 July
6	R18	Croft Circuit (North Yorkshire)	29–30 July
7	R19	Knockhill Racing Circuit (Fife)	12–13 August
7	R20	Knockhill Racing Circuit (Fife)	12–13 August
7	R21	Knockhill Racing Circuit (Fife)	12–13 August
8	R22	Donington Park (Grand Prix Circuit, Leicestershire)	26–27 August
8	R23	Donington Park (Grand Prix Circuit, Leicestershire)	26–27 August
8	R24	Donington Park (Grand Prix Circuit, Leicestershire)	26–27 August
9	R25	Silverstone Circuit (National Circuit, Northamptonshire)	23–24 September
9	R26	Silverstone Circuit (National Circuit, Northamptonshire)	23–24 September
9	R27	Silverstone Circuit (National Circuit, Northamptonshire)	23–24 September
10	R28	Brands Hatch (Grand Prix Circuit, Kent)	7–8 October
10	R29	Brands Hatch (Grand Prix Circuit, Kent)	7–8 October
10	R30	Brands Hatch (Grand Prix Circuit, Kent)	7–8 October

== Results and standings ==
Round		Circuit	Pole position	Fastest lap	Winning Driver	Winning team	Winning independent	Winning JST
1	R1	Donington Park National	Daniel Rowbottom	Dan Cammish	Dan Cammish	NAPA Racing UK	Andrew Watson	Andrew Watson
1	R2	Donington Park National		Tom Ingram	Tom Chilton	Bristol Street Motors with EXCELR8	Mikey Doble	Sam Osborne
1	R3	Donington Park National		Jake Hill	Dan Cammish	NAPA Racing UK	Bobby Thompson	Andrew Watson
2	R1	Brands Hatch Indy	Dan Cammish	Ashley Sutton	Colin Turkington	Team BMW	Bobby Thompson	Sam Osborne
2	R2	Brands Hatch Indy		Ashley Sutton	Ashley Sutton	NAPA Racing UK	Josh Cook	Sam Osborne
2	R3	Brands Hatch Indy		Ashley Sutton	Ashley Sutton	NAPA Racing UK	Bobby Thompson	Ronan Pearson
3	R1	Snetterton Motor Racing Circuit	Ashley Sutton	Tom Ingram	Ashley Sutton	NAPA Racing UK	Josh Cook	Ronan Pearson
3	R2	Snetterton Motor Racing Circuit		Ashley Sutton	Ashley Sutton	NAPA Racing UK	Daniel Lloyd	Sam Osborne
3	R3	Snetterton Motor Racing Circuit		Tom Ingram	Tom Ingram	Bristol Street Motors with EXCELR8	Josh Cook	Dexter Patterson
4	R1	Thruxton Circuit	Ashley Sutton	Josh Cook	Ashley Sutton	NAPA Racing UK	Josh Cook	Mikey Doble
4	R2	Thruxton Circuit		Ashley Sutton	Ashley Sutton	NAPA Racing UK	Josh Cook	Mikey Doble
4	R3	Thruxton Circuit		Josh Cook	Daniel Rowbottom	NAPA Racing UK	Aiden Moffat	Andrew Watson
5	R1	Oulton Park	Ashley Sutton	Jake Hill	Jake Hill	Laser Tools Racing with MB Motorsport	Josh Cook	Mikey Doble
5	R2	Oulton Park		Jake Hill	Jake Hill	Laser Tools Racing with MB Motorsport	Josh Cook	Andrew Watson
5	R3	Oulton Park		Jake Hill	Colin Turkington	Team BMW	Aiden Moffat	Sam Osborne
6	R1	Croft Circuit	Dan Cammish	Ashley Sutton	Dan Cammish	NAPA Racing UK	Josh Cook	Sam Osborne
6	R2	Croft Circuit		Ashley Sutton	Ashley Sutton	NAPA Racing UK	Josh Cook	Andrew Watson
6	R3	Croft Circuit		Colin Turkington	Colin Turkington	Team BMW	Josh Cook	Mikey Doble
7	R1	Knockhill Racing Circuit	Ashley Sutton	Josh Cook	Jake Hill	Laser Tools Racing with MB Motorsport	Andrew Watson	Andrew Watson
7	R2	Knockhill Racing Circuit		Ashley Sutton	Jake Hill	Laser Tools Racing with MB Motorsport	Árón Taylor-Smith	Ronan Pearson
7	R3	Knockhill Racing Circuit		Ashley Sutton	Ashley Sutton	NAPA Racing UK	Josh Cook	Ronan Pearson
8	R1	Donington Park GP	Ashley Sutton	Ashley Sutton	Ashley Sutton	NAPA Racing UK	Árón Taylor-Smith	Andrew Watson
8	R2	Donington Park GP		Tom Ingram	Tom Ingram	Bristol Street Motors with EXCELR8	Josh Cook	Ronan Pearson
8	R3	Donington Park GP		Ronan Pearson	Rory Butcher	Toyota Gazoo Racing UK	Árón Taylor-Smith	Sam Osborne
9	R1	Silverstone Circuit	Mikey Doble	Árón Taylor-Smith	Jake Hill	Laser Tools Racing with MB Motorsport	Andrew Watson	Andrew Watson
9	R2	Silverstone Circuit		Tom Ingram	Ashley Sutton	NAPA Racing UK	Árón Taylor-Smith	Andrew Watson
9	R3	Silverstone Circuit		Colin Turkington	Colin Turkington	Team BMW	Josh Cook	Ronan Pearson
10	R1	Brands Hatch GP	Ashley Sutton	Ashley Sutton	Ashley Sutton	NAPA Racing UK	Bobby Thompson	Andrew Watson
10	R2	Brands Hatch GP		Ashley Sutton	Ashley Sutton	NAPA Racing UK	Bobby Thompson	Dexter Patterson
10	R3	Brands Hatch GP		Jake Hill	Jake Hill	Laser Tools Racing with MB Motorsport	Josh Cook	Dexter Patterson

=== Drivers' Championship ===
Points system
1st	2nd	3rd	4th	5th	6th	7th	8th	9th	10th	11th	12th	13th	14th	15th	R1 PP	Fastest lap	Lead laps in race
20	17	15	13	11	10	9	8	7	6	5	4	3	2	1	1	1	1

Notes

- The point for leading laps in race is one point, regardless of how many laps led.

Pos.	Driver	DPN			BHI			SNE			THR			OUL			CRO			KNO			DPGP			SIL			BHGP			Pts
1	(United Kingdom) Ashley Sutton	Ret	15	3	2^{F}	1^{FL}	1^{FL}	1^{PL}	1^{FL}	4	1^{PL}	1^{FL}	12	2^{P}	2	Ret	2^{F}	1^{FL}	Ret	6^{PL}	2^{F}	1^{FL}	1^{PFL}	2^{L}	5	23	1^{L}	3	1^{PFL}	1^{FL}	13	446
2	(United Kingdom) Tom Ingram	3	9^{F}	2	5	2	3	4^{F}	7	1^{FL}	2	2	9	3	3	4	6	4	2	DSQ	10	3	3^{L}	1^{FL}	7	22	3^{F}	2	2	2	4	400
3	(United Kingdom) Jake Hill	2^{L}	16	4^{F}	4	4	22	2	2	10	4	4	10	1^{FL}	1^{FL}	2^{F}	5	11	7	1	1^{L}	14	2	3	8	1^{L}	20^{L}	8	6	6	1^{FL}	372
4	(United Kingdom) Colin Turkington	12	8	5	1^{L}	3	5	3	3	7	6	6	4	9	4	1^{L}	7	6	1^{FL}	11	Ret	17	5	4	6	Ret	8	1^{FL}	4	Ret	10	312
5	(United Kingdom) Josh Cook	9	19	7	8	7	10	8	27	5	3^{F}	3	11^{F}	6	5	7	4	5	3	Ret^{FL}	8	2	7	5	Ret	9	7	6	12	7	2^{L}	268
6	(United Kingdom) Dan Cammish	1^{FL}	12^{L}	1^{L}	3^{P}	5	4	11	11	DSQ	5	5	8	5	6	5	1^{PL}	2	4	14	Ret	10	WD	WD	WD	Ret	24	23	5	3	9	253
7	(United Kingdom) Daniel Rowbottom	5^{P}	11	10	Ret	15	9	7	4	3^{L}	24	11	1^{L}	Ret	21	8	3	3	5	DNS	23	Ret	8	7	22	2	10	4^{L}	7	8	5	226
8	(United Kingdom) Ricky Collard	6	Ret	14	9	9	8^{L}	Ret	13	14	11	9	5	4	9	9	11	8	15	3	6	5	4	6	4	20	14	7	9	4	6	217
9	(United Kingdom) Adam Morgan	7	2	22	Ret	16	6	5	5	9	13	12	2^{L}	8	7	3^{L}	19	13	Ret	16	NC	18	12	9	3	4	5	10	10	13	8	199
10	(United Kingdom) Rory Butcher	11	14	11	7	6	Ret	9	8	2	7	7	7	16	10	10	25	18	8	Ret	15	12	11	8	1^{L}	6	4	Ret	23	19	15	173
11	(Republic of Ireland) Árón Taylor-Smith	10	20	9	12	Ret	DNS	10	12	Ret	9	8	6	Ret	19	Ret	10	12	9	7	4	15	6	10	2	7^{F}	2^{L}	9	11	Ret	21	165
12	(United Kingdom) Stephen Jelley	22	4	20	Ret	DNS	24	6	6	6^{L}	19	17	16	10	18	13	8	7	Ret	4	3	19	19	13	10	19	18	13	8	9	3^{L}	141
13	(United Kingdom) Daniel Lloyd	19	13	18	10	14	11	15	10	17	NC	21	18	11	8	23	12	9	Ret	10	5	8	17	12	Ret^{L}	10	9	11	15	10	7	111
14	(United Kingdom) Tom Chilton	15	1^{L}	8	15	12	7	24	15	11	12	13	25	12	11	12	15	10	Ret	DSQ	16	20	10	11	12	13	16	Ret	13	12	Ret	97
15	(United Kingdom) Andrew Watson	4	21	12	Ret	20	23	18	18	18	18	16	13	15	12	15	16	14	14	2	9	16	9	16	11	3	6	18	14	18	18	93
16	(United Kingdom) Aiden Moffat	13	17	15	13	19	12	19	17	8	14	10	3	20	15	6	13	17	6	Ret	19	7	18	Ret	18	17	13	12	25	11	Ret	87
17	(United Kingdom) Bobby Thompson	16	10	6	6	11	2	16	20	12	10	Ret	DNS	7	Ret	Ret										5	Ret	22	3	5	Ret	74
18	(United Kingdom) Ronan Pearson	24	DSQ	19	16	13	13	12	14	Ret	15	19	19	18	16	17	NC	24	19	5	7	4^{L}	14	14	15^{F}	24	11	5	20	Ret	16	69
19	(United Kingdom) Sam Osborne	17	3	Ret	14	10	14	13	9	20	21	18	20	Ret	23	14	9	15	17	18	17	13	15	15	9	8	17	17	18	Ret	17	65
20	(United Kingdom) Mikey Doble	20	5	Ret	19	18	16	17	19	15	8	14	14	13	13	22	14	16	12	9	12	11	16	17	16	11^{P}	15	14	Ret	16	14	63
21	(United Kingdom) George Gamble	8	Ret	13	11	8	21	14	16	Ret	17	Ret	17	Ret	20	11	18	Ret	10	8	11	9	13	Ret	13	15	23	15	16	Ret	Ret	50
22	(United Kingdom) Dexter Patterson	14	18	16	17	17	15	20	22	13	16	15	15	14	14	20	17	Ret	13	12	13	6	21	18	14	18	19	16	17	14	11	41
23	(United Kingdom) Michael Crees																21	19	11	20	18	Ret	20	19	17	12	12	Ret	24	Ret	DNS	13
24	(United Kingdom) Nicolas Hamilton	21	6	21	21	25	19	23	24	Ret	22	22	23	21	22	24	WD	WD	WD													10
25	(Philippines) Daryl DeLeon																23	21	18	Ret	22	Ret	22	Ret	Ret	14	26	21	21	Ret	12	6
26	(United Kingdom) Robert Huff																			13	14	Ret										5
27	(United Kingdom) James Gornall																												Ret	15	19	1
28	(United Kingdom) Jack Butel	23	Ret	17	18	24	17	21	21	16	Ret	20	21	17	17	18	20	20	Ret	19	20	22	23	Ret	21	21	25	24				0
29	(United Kingdom) Will Powell	18	Ret	Ret	22	21	18	22	23	19	20	Ret	24	19	Ret	21																0
30	(United Kingdom) Nick Halstead	Ret	7	Ret	23	23	20	26	25	21	NC	23	22	23	24	19	22	22	20	15	21	Ret	24	20	20	25	21	19	22	20	20	-5
31	(United Kingdom) Jade Edwards	Ret	NC	Ret	20	22	Ret	25	26	DNS	23	Ret	Ret	22	Ret	16	24	23	16	17	Ret	21	25	21	19	16	22	20	19	17	Ret	-5
Pos.	Driver	DPN			BHI			SNE			THR			OUL			CRO			KNO			DPGP			SIL			BHGP			Pts

Colour	Result
Gold	Winner
Silver	2nd place
Bronze	3rd place
Green	Points finish
Blue	Non-points finish
Blue	Non-classified finish (NC)
Purple	Retired (Ret)
Red	Did not qualify (DNQ)
Red	Did not pre-qualify (DNPQ)
Black	Disqualified (DSQ)
White	Did not start (DNS)
White	Withdrew (WD)
White	Race cancelled (C)
Blank	Did not participate (DNP)
Blank	Excluded (EX)

^{P} – Pole position
^{F} – Fastest lap
^{L} – Lead race lap

=== Teams' Championship ===
Pos.	Team	Points
1	NAPA Racing UK	713
2	Bristol Street Motors with Excelr8	564*
3	Team BMW	559
4	One Motorsport with Starline Racing	426
5	TOYOTA GAZOO Racing UK	420*
6	Laser Tools Racing with MB Motorsport	381
7	CarStore Power Maxed Racing	342
8	Autobrite Direct with Millers Oils	267*
9	Re. Beverages and Bartercard with Team HARD	113
10	Go-Fix with Autoaid Breakdown	66

*denotes penalty

=== Independent Drivers' Championship ===
Pos.	Driver	DPN			BHI			SNE			THR			OUL			CRO			KNO			DPGP			SIL			BHGP			Pts
1	(United Kingdom) Josh Cook	9	19	7	8	7	10	8	27	5	3^{F}	3	11^{F}	6	5	7	4	5	3	Ret^{FL}	8	2	7	5	Ret	9	7	6	12	7	2^{L}	485
2	(Republic of Ireland) Árón Taylor-Smith	10	20	9	12	Ret	DNS	10	12	Ret	9	8	6	Ret	19	Ret	10	12	9	7	4	15	6	10	2	7	2	9	11	Ret	21	370
3	(United Kingdom) Daniel Lloyd	19	13	18	10	14	11	15	10	17	NC	21	18	11	8	23	12	9	Ret	10	5	8	17	12	Ret^{L}	10	9	11	15	10	7	357
4	(United Kingdom) Andrew Watson	4	21	12	Ret	20	23	18	18	18	18	16	13	15	12	15	16	14	14	2	9	16	9	16	11	3	6	18	14	18	18	353
5	(United Kingdom) Mikey Doble	20	5	Ret	19	18	16	17	19	15	8	14	14	13	13	22	14	16	12	9	12	11	16	17	16	11	15	14	Ret	16	14	321
6	(United Kingdom) Aiden Moffat	13	17	15	13	19	12	19	17	8	14	10	3	20	15	6	13	17	6	Ret	19	7	18	Ret	18	17	13	12	Ret	11	Ret	317
7	(United Kingdom) Dexter Patterson	14	18	16	17	17	15	20	22	13	16	15	15	14	14	20	17	Ret	13	12	13	6	21	18	14	18	19	16	17	14	11	306
8	(United Kingdom) Bobby Thompson	16	10	6	6	11	2	16	20	12	10	Ret	DNS	7	Ret	Ret										6	Ret	22	3	5	Ret	203*
9	(United Kingdom) Jack Butel	23	Ret	17	18	24	17	21	21	16	Ret	20	21	17	17	18	20	20	Ret	19	20	22	23	Ret	21	21	25	24				176
10	(United Kingdom) Jade Edwards	DNS	NC	Ret	20	22	Ret	25	26	DNS	23	Ret	Ret	22	Ret	16	24	23	16	17	Ret	21	25	21	19	16	22	20	19	17	Ret	139*
11	(United Kingdom) Michael Crees																21	19	11	20	18	Ret	20	19	17	12	12	Ret	24	Ret	DNS	100
12	(United Kingdom) Nicolas Hamilton	21	6	21	21	25	19	23	24	Ret	22	22	23	21	22	24	WD	WD	WD													99
13	(United Kingdom) Will Powell	18	Ret	Ret	22	21	18	22	23	19	20	Ret	24	19	Ret	21																81
14	(Philippines) Daryl DeLeon																23	21	18	Ret	22	Ret	22	Ret	Ret	14	26	21	21	Ret	12	73
15	(United Kingdom) Robert Huff																			13	14	Ret										19
16	(United Kingdom) James Gornall																												Ret	15	19	19
Pos.	Driver	DPN			BHI			SNE			THR			OUL			CRO			KNO			DPGP			SIL			BHGP			Pts

*denotes penalty

=== Independent Teams' Championship ===
Pos.	Team	Points
1	One Motorsport with Starline Racing	536
2	CarStore Power Maxed Racing	498
3	Autobrite Direct with Millers Oils	460*
4	Re. Beverages and Bartercard with Team HARD	406
5	Go-Fix with Autoaid Breakdown	348

*denotes penalty

=== Manufacturers' Championship ===
Pos.	Manufacturer	Constructor	Points
1	Ford	Motorbase Performance	802
2	BMW	West Surrey Racing	798
3	Hyundai	EXCELR8 Motorsport	699*
4	Toyota	Speedworks Motorsport	583*

*denotes penalty

=== Jack Sears Trophy ===
Pos.	Driver	DPN			BHI			SNE			THR			OUL			CRO			KNO			DPGP			SIL			BHGP			Pts
1	(United Kingdom) Andrew Watson	4	21	12	Ret	20	23	18	18	18	18	16	13	15	12	15	16	14	14	2	9	16	9	16	11	3	6	18	14	18	18	451
2	(United Kingdom) Mikey Doble	20	5	Ret	19	18	16	17	19	15	8	14	14	13	13	22	14	16	12	9	12	11	16	17	16	11	15	14	Ret	16	14	422
3	(United Kingdom) Dexter Patterson	14	18	16	17	17	15	20	22	13	16	15	15	14	14	20	17	Ret	13	12	13	6	21	18	14	18	19	16	17	14	11	422
4	(United Kingdom) Sam Osborne	17	3	Ret	14	10	14	13	9	20	21	18	20	Ret	23	14	9	15	17	18	17	13	15	15	9	8	17	17	18	Ret	17	404
5	(United Kingdom) Ronan Pearson	24	DSQ	19	16	13	13	12	14	Ret	15	19	19	18	16	17	NC	24	19	5	7	4	14	14	15	24	11	5	20	Ret	16	383
6	(United Kingdom) Jack Butel	23	Ret	17	18	24	17	21	21	16	Ret	20	21	17	17	18	20	20	Ret	19	20	22	23	Ret	21	21	25	24				238
7	(United Kingdom) Nick Halstead	Ret	7	Ret	23	23	20	26	25	21	NC	23	22	23	24	19	22	22	20	15	21	Ret	24	20	20	25	21	19	22	20	20	214*
8	(United Kingdom) Jade Edwards	DNS	NC	Ret	20	22	Ret	25	26	DNS	23	Ret	Ret	22	Ret	16	24	23	16	17	Ret	21	25	21	19	16	22	20	19	17	Ret	189*
9	(United Kingdom) Nicolas Hamilton	21	6	21	21	25	19	23	24	Ret	22	22	23	21	22	24	WD	WD	WD													127
10	(United Kingdom) Will Powell	18	Ret	Ret	22	21	18	22	23	19	20	Ret	24	19	Ret	21																106
11	(Philippines) Daryl DeLeon																23	21	18	Ret	22	Ret	22	Ret	Ret	14	26	21	21	Ret	12	103
12	(United Kingdom) James Gornall																												Ret	15	19	26
Pos.	Driver	DPN			BHI			SNE			THR			OUL			CRO			KNO			DPGP			SIL			BHGP			Pts

*denotes penalty

=== Goodyear Wingfoot Award ===
Pos.	Driver	Points
1	(United Kingdom) Ashley Sutton	176
2	(United Kingdom) Tom Ingram	130
3	(United Kingdom) Jake Hill	127
4	(United Kingdom) Colin Turkington	113
5	(United Kingdom) Josh Cook	90
6	(United Kingdom) Dan Cammish	88
7	(United Kingdom) Daniel Rowbottom	76
8	(United Kingdom) Rory Butcher	74
9	(United Kingdom) Ricky Collard	67
10	(United Kingdom) Adam Morgan	56
11	(Republic of Ireland) Árón Taylor-Smith	55
12	(United Kingdom) Mikey Doble	41
13	(United Kingdom) Bobby Thompson	37
14	(United Kingdom) Tom Chilton	34
15	(United Kingdom) Ronan Pearson	29
16	(United Kingdom) Daniel Lloyd	28
17	(United Kingdom) Andrew Watson	28
18	(United Kingdom) Stephen Jelley	23
19	(United Kingdom) Aiden Moffat	21
20	(United Kingdom) Sam Osborne	7
21	(United Kingdom) George Gamble	6
22	(United Kingdom) Jack Butel	3
23	(United Kingdom) Dexter Patterson	1
24	(United Kingdom) Will Powell	0
25	(United Kingdom) Nicolas Hamilton	0
26	(United Kingdom) Nick Halstead	0
27	(United Kingdom) Jade Edwards	0
28	(United Kingdom) Robert Huff	0
29	(United Kingdom) Michael Crees	0
30	(Philippines) Daryl DeLeon	0
