= 2026 British GT Championship =

Sports car racing season

The 2026 British GT Championship was the 34th British GT Championship, a sports car championship promoted by the SRO Motorsports Group. The season began on 25 April at Silverstone Circuit and finished on 27 September at Brands Hatch.

== Calendar ==
The provisional calendar was announced on 27 June 2025, featuring multiple changes. The second round at Donington Park was dropped due to economic reasons, meaning the season started at Silverstone Circuit in late April. On May 19, 2026, at an SRO 24 Hours of Spa press conference, it was announced that the FFSA GT - French GT4 as well as the Alpine Elf Cup Series and the Ginetta GTA Cup - France would join the grid at Circuit de Spa-Francorchamps for Spa Speedweek.

Round	Circuit	Length	Date
1	(United Kingdom) Silverstone Circuit, Northamptonshire	180 min	24–26 April
2	(United Kingdom) Oulton Park, Cheshire	60 min	22–25 May
3	(United Kingdom) Oulton Park, Cheshire	60 min	22–25 May
4	Circuit de Spa-Francorchamps, Stavelot, Belgium	120 min	20–21 June
5	(United Kingdom) Snetterton Circuit, Norfolk	60 min	15–16 August
6	(United Kingdom) Snetterton Circuit, Norfolk	60 min	15–16 August
7	(United Kingdom) Donington Park, Leicestershire	120 min	5–6 September
8	(United Kingdom) Brands Hatch, Kent	120 min	26–27 September

== Entry list ==
Team	Car	Engine	No.	Drivers	Class	Rounds
GT3
(Bahrain) 2 Seas Motorsport	Mercedes-AMG GT3 Evo	Mercedes-AMG M159 6.2 L V8	1	(United Kingdom) Charles Dawson	PA	1
(Bahrain) 2 Seas Motorsport	Mercedes-AMG GT3 Evo	Mercedes-AMG M159 6.2 L V8	1	(United Kingdom) Kiern Jewiss	PA	1
(Bahrain) 2 Seas Motorsport	Mercedes-AMG GT3 Evo	Mercedes-AMG M159 6.2 L V8	15	(United Kingdom) Aaron Walker	SA	All
(Bahrain) 2 Seas Motorsport	Mercedes-AMG GT3 Evo	Mercedes-AMG M159 6.2 L V8	15	(United Kingdom) Andrew Gilbert	SA	1
(Bahrain) 2 Seas Motorsport	Mercedes-AMG GT3 Evo	Mercedes-AMG M159 6.2 L V8	15	(United Kingdom) Ian Loggie	SA	2–6
(Bahrain) 2 Seas Motorsport	Mercedes-AMG GT3 Evo	Mercedes-AMG M159 6.2 L V8	15	(United Kingdom) Charles Dawson	SA	7
(Bahrain) 2 Seas Motorsport	Mercedes-AMG GT3 Evo	Mercedes-AMG M159 6.2 L V8	15	(Thailand) Todd Kingsford	SA	8
(Bahrain) 2 Seas Motorsport	Mercedes-AMG GT3 Evo	Mercedes-AMG M159 6.2 L V8	18	(Hong Kong) Kevin Tse	PA	All
(Bahrain) 2 Seas Motorsport	Mercedes-AMG GT3 Evo	Mercedes-AMG M159 6.2 L V8	18	(United Kingdom) Ben Green	PA	1–6
(Bahrain) 2 Seas Motorsport	Mercedes-AMG GT3 Evo	Mercedes-AMG M159 6.2 L V8	18	(United Kingdom) Chris Lulham	PA	7–8
(United Kingdom) Optimum Motorsport	McLaren 720S GT3 Evo	McLaren M840T 4.0 L Turbo V8	3	(Australia) Garnet Patterson	SA	1
(United Kingdom) Optimum Motorsport	McLaren 720S GT3 Evo	McLaren M840T 4.0 L Turbo V8	3	(Australia) Yasser Shahin	SA	1
(United Kingdom) Optimum Motorsport	McLaren 720S GT3 Evo	McLaren M840T 4.0 L Turbo V8	3	(United Kingdom) Callum MacLeod	PA	4–8
(United Kingdom) Optimum Motorsport	McLaren 720S GT3 Evo	McLaren M840T 4.0 L Turbo V8	3	(United Kingdom) Mike Price	PA	4–8
(United Kingdom) Optimum Motorsport	McLaren 720S GT3 Evo	McLaren M840T 4.0 L Turbo V8	77	(United Kingdom) Ben Barnicoat	PA	All
(United Kingdom) Optimum Motorsport	McLaren 720S GT3 Evo	McLaren M840T 4.0 L Turbo V8	77	(United Kingdom) Morgan Tillbrook	PA	All
(United Kingdom) Optimum Motorsport	McLaren 720S GT3 Evo	McLaren M840T 4.0 L Turbo V8	90	(United Kingdom) Jack Brown	SA	All
(United Kingdom) Optimum Motorsport	McLaren 720S GT3 Evo	McLaren M840T 4.0 L Turbo V8	90	(United Kingdom) Marc Warren	SA	All
(United Kingdom) Paradine Competition	BMW M4 GT3 Evo	BMW P58 3.0 L Turbo I6	6	(United Kingdom) Phil Keen	PA	1
(United Kingdom) Paradine Competition	BMW M4 GT3 Evo	BMW P58 3.0 L Turbo I6	6	(United Kingdom) Ian Loggie	PA	1
(United Kingdom) Paradine Competition	BMW M4 GT3 Evo	BMW P58 3.0 L Turbo I6	91	(United Kingdom) Dan Harper	PA	1
(United Kingdom) Paradine Competition	BMW M4 GT3 Evo	BMW P58 3.0 L Turbo I6	91	(United Kingdom) Darren Leung	PA	1
(United Kingdom) Beechdean Motorsport Ltd	Aston Martin Vantage AMR GT3 Evo	Aston Martin AMR16A 4.0 L Turbo V8	7	(United Kingdom) Andrew Howard	PA	All
(United Kingdom) Beechdean Motorsport Ltd	Aston Martin Vantage AMR GT3 Evo	Aston Martin AMR16A 4.0 L Turbo V8	7	(United Kingdom) Ross Gunn	PA	All
(United Kingdom) Paddock Motorsport	McLaren 720S GT3 Evo (1–6); Porsche 911 GT3 R (992.2) (8)	McLaren M840T 4.0 L Turbo V8 (1–6); Porsche M97/80 4.2 L Flat-6 (8)	9	(United Kingdom) Martin Plowman	PA	1–6, 8
(United Kingdom) Paddock Motorsport	McLaren 720S GT3 Evo (1–6); Porsche 911 GT3 R (992.2) (8)	McLaren M840T 4.0 L Turbo V8 (1–6); Porsche M97/80 4.2 L Flat-6 (8)	9	(United States) Mark Smith	PA	1–6, 8
(New Zealand) Rodin Motorsport	Ferrari 296 GT3 Evo	Ferrari F163CE 3.0 L Turbo V6	13	(Australia) Josh Buchan	SA	1–7
(New Zealand) Rodin Motorsport	Ferrari 296 GT3 Evo	Ferrari F163CE 3.0 L Turbo V6	13	(Australia) Cameron Campbell	SA	1–7
(United Kingdom) Century Motorsport	BMW M4 GT3 Evo	BMW P58 3.0 L Turbo I6	44	(United Kingdom) Jonathon Beeson	SA	All
(United Kingdom) Century Motorsport	BMW M4 GT3 Evo	BMW P58 3.0 L Turbo I6	44	(United Kingdom) Charles Clark	SA	All
(United Kingdom) Barwell Motorsport	Lamborghini Huracán GT3 Evo 2	Lamborghini DGF 5.2 L V10	55	(United Kingdom) Duncan Cameron	PA	1–3
(United Kingdom) Barwell Motorsport	Lamborghini Huracán GT3 Evo 2	Lamborghini DGF 5.2 L V10	55	(Republic of Ireland) Matt Griffin	PA	1–3
(United Kingdom) Barwell Motorsport	Lamborghini Huracán GT3 Evo 2	Lamborghini DGF 5.2 L V10	63	(United Kingdom) Rob Collard	PA	All
(United Kingdom) Barwell Motorsport	Lamborghini Huracán GT3 Evo 2	Lamborghini DGF 5.2 L V10	63	(United Kingdom) Hugo Cook	PA	All
(United Kingdom) Barwell Motorsport	Lamborghini Huracán GT3 Evo 2	Lamborghini DGF 5.2 L V10	78	(United Kingdom) Alex Martin	SA	All
(United Kingdom) Barwell Motorsport	Lamborghini Huracán GT3 Evo 2	Lamborghini DGF 5.2 L V10	78	(South Africa) Jarrod Waberski	SA	All
(Germany) Herberth Motorsport	Porsche 911 GT3 R (992.2)	Porsche M97/80 4.2 L Flat-6	57	(Japan) "Bankcy"	PA	4
(Germany) Herberth Motorsport	Porsche 911 GT3 R (992.2)	Porsche M97/80 4.2 L Flat-6	57	(United Kingdom) Harry King	PA	4
(United Kingdom) Orange Racing by JMH	McLaren 720S GT3 Evo	McLaren M840T 4.0 L Turbo V8	67	(United Kingdom) Marcus Clutton	PA	All
(United Kingdom) Orange Racing by JMH	McLaren 720S GT3 Evo	McLaren M840T 4.0 L Turbo V8	67	(United Kingdom) Simon Orange	PA	All
(United Kingdom) Orange Racing by JMH	McLaren 720S GT3 Evo	McLaren M840T 4.0 L Turbo V8	69	(United Kingdom) Steven Lake	SA	4–6
(United Kingdom) Orange Racing by JMH	McLaren 720S GT3 Evo	McLaren M840T 4.0 L Turbo V8	69	(United Kingdom) Tom Wood	SA	4
(United Kingdom) Orange Racing by JMH	McLaren 720S GT3 Evo	McLaren M840T 4.0 L Turbo V8	69	(United Kingdom) Dean MacDonald	SA	5–6
(United Kingdom) Mahiki Racing	McLaren 720S GT3 Evo	McLaren M840T 4.0 L Turbo V8	69	(United Kingdom) Steven Lake	SA	1
(United Kingdom) Mahiki Racing	McLaren 720S GT3 Evo	McLaren M840T 4.0 L Turbo V8	69	(United Kingdom) Josh Rowledge	SA	1
(United Kingdom) Mahiki Racing	McLaren 720S GT3 Evo	McLaren M840T 4.0 L Turbo V8	71	(United Kingdom) Luke Garlick	SA	1–3
(United Kingdom) Mahiki Racing	McLaren 720S GT3 Evo	McLaren M840T 4.0 L Turbo V8	71	(United Kingdom) Ed McDermott	SA	1
(United Kingdom) Mahiki Racing	McLaren 720S GT3 Evo	McLaren M840T 4.0 L Turbo V8	71	(United Kingdom) Matt Topham	SA	2–3
GT4
(United Kingdom) Innovation Racing	Ginetta G56 GT4 Evo	Ginetta LS3 6.2 L V8	5	(United Kingdom) Samuel Branston	S	7
(United Kingdom) Innovation Racing	Ginetta G56 GT4 Evo	Ginetta LS3 6.2 L V8	5	(United Kingdom) James Wareing	S	7
(United Kingdom) Innovation Racing	Ginetta G56 GT4 Evo	Ginetta LS3 6.2 L V8	74	(United Kingdom) Thomas Holland	S	All
(United Kingdom) Innovation Racing	Ginetta G56 GT4 Evo	Ginetta LS3 6.2 L V8	74	(United Kingdom) Hadley Simpson	S	All
(United Kingdom) Toro Verde GT	Porsche 718 Cayman GT4 RS Clubsport	Porsche MDG.GA 4.0 L Flat-6	8	(United Kingdom) Tom Bradshaw	PA	All
(United Kingdom) Toro Verde GT	Porsche 718 Cayman GT4 RS Clubsport	Porsche MDG.GA 4.0 L Flat-6	8	(United Kingdom) Ian Duggan	PA	All
(United Kingdom) Toro Verde GT	Ginetta G56 GT4 Evo	Ginetta LS3 6.2 L V8	42	(United Kingdom) Jack Mitchell	PA	All
(United Kingdom) Toro Verde GT	Ginetta G56 GT4 Evo	Ginetta LS3 6.2 L V8	42	(United Kingdom) Luke Shaw	PA	All
(United Kingdom) MK Racing	Aston Martin Vantage AMR GT4 Evo	Aston Martin M177 4.0 L Turbo V8	21	(United Kingdom) Jessica Hawkins	S	All
(United Kingdom) MK Racing	Aston Martin Vantage AMR GT4 Evo	Aston Martin M177 4.0 L Turbo V8	21	(United Kingdom) Will Orton	S	All
(United Kingdom) Century Motorsport	BMW M4 GT4 Evo (G82)	BMW S58B30T0 3.0 L Turbo I6	24	(United Kingdom) Jack Collins	S	All
(United Kingdom) Century Motorsport	BMW M4 GT4 Evo (G82)	BMW S58B30T0 3.0 L Turbo I6	24	(United Kingdom) Branden Templeton	S	All
(United Kingdom) Grange Racing by FSR	Aston Martin Vantage AMR GT4 Evo	Aston Martin M177 4.0 L Turbo V8	27	(United Kingdom) Darren Turner	PA	All
(United Kingdom) Grange Racing by FSR	Aston Martin Vantage AMR GT4 Evo	Aston Martin M177 4.0 L Turbo V8	27	(United Kingdom) Daniel Lavery	PA	All
(United Kingdom) Townsend Racing powered by Fox Motorsport	Aston Martin Vantage AMR GT4 Evo	Aston Martin M177 4.0 L Turbo V8	40	(United Kingdom) James Townsend	PA	All
(United Kingdom) Townsend Racing powered by Fox Motorsport	Aston Martin Vantage AMR GT4 Evo	Aston Martin M177 4.0 L Turbo V8	40	(United Kingdom) Joe Wheeler	PA	All
(United Kingdom) Optimum Motorsport	McLaren Artura GT4	McLaren M630 3.0 L Turbo V6	59	(United Kingdom) Josh Stanton	S	All
(United Kingdom) Optimum Motorsport	McLaren Artura GT4	McLaren M630 3.0 L Turbo V6	59	(United Kingdom) Luca Hopkinson	S	1–3
(United Kingdom) Optimum Motorsport	McLaren Artura GT4	McLaren M630 3.0 L Turbo V6	59	(United Kingdom) Mikey Porter	S	4
(United Kingdom) Optimum Motorsport	McLaren Artura GT4	McLaren M630 3.0 L Turbo V6	59	(United Kingdom) George Gamble	S	5–8
(United Kingdom) WSR FlexiFly	BMW M4 GT4 Evo (G82)	BMW S58B30T0 3.0 L Turbo I6	61	(United Kingdom) Ernie Graham	PA	All
(United Kingdom) WSR FlexiFly	BMW M4 GT4 Evo (G82)	BMW S58B30T0 3.0 L Turbo I6	61	(United Kingdom) Colin Turkington	PA	All
(United Kingdom) Mahiki Racing	McLaren Artura GT4	McLaren M630 3.0 L Turbo V6	84	(United Kingdom) Blake Angliss	S	1–3
(United Kingdom) Mahiki Racing	McLaren Artura GT4	McLaren M630 3.0 L Turbo V6	84	(United Kingdom) Revie Lake	S	1–3
(United Kingdom) Paddock Motorsport	McLaren Artura GT4	McLaren M630 3.0 L Turbo V6	84	(United Kingdom) Blake Angliss	S	4–8
(United Kingdom) Paddock Motorsport	McLaren Artura GT4	McLaren M630 3.0 L Turbo V6	84	(United Kingdom) Revie Lake	S	4–8
(United Kingdom) GBR Stratton Motorsport	Aston Martin Vantage AMR GT4 Evo	Aston Martin M177 4.0 L Turbo V8	97	(United Kingdom) John Hartshorne	PA	All
(United Kingdom) GBR Stratton Motorsport	Aston Martin Vantage AMR GT4 Evo	Aston Martin M177 4.0 L Turbo V8	97	(United Kingdom) Ronan Pearson	PA	1–4
(United Kingdom) GBR Stratton Motorsport	Aston Martin Vantage AMR GT4 Evo	Aston Martin M177 4.0 L Turbo V8	97	(United Kingdom) Jonny Adam	PA	5–6
(United Kingdom) GBR Stratton Motorsport	Aston Martin Vantage AMR GT4 Evo	Aston Martin M177 4.0 L Turbo V8	97	(United Kingdom) Jordan Collard	PA	7–8

Icon	Class
GT3 Classes
PA	Pro-Am Cup
SA	Silver-Am Cup
	GT Academy Entrant
GT4 Classes
PA	Pro-Am Cup
S	Silver Cup

- Kenzie Beecroft was initially scheduled to drive the No. 15 2 Seas Motorsport Mercedes-AMG but made no appearances throughout the season.

== Race results ==
Bold indicates overall winner for each car class (GT3 and GT4).

=== GT3 ===
Event	Circuit	Pole position	Pro-Am Winners	Silver-Am Winners
1	Silverstone	(United Kingdom) No. 91 Paradine Competition	(United Kingdom) No. 91 Paradine Competition	**(United Kingdom) No. 3 Optimum Motorsport**
1	Silverstone	(United Kingdom) Dan Harper (United Kingdom) Darren Leung	(United Kingdom) Dan Harper (United Kingdom) Darren Leung	**(Australia) Garnet Patterson** **(Australia) Yasser Shahin**
2	Oulton Park	(United Kingdom) No. 7 Beechdean Motorsport Ltd	**(United Kingdom) No. 63 Barwell Motorsport**	(United Kingdom) No. 90 Optimum Motorsport
2	Oulton Park	(United Kingdom) Andrew Howard (United Kingdom) Ross Gunn	**(United Kingdom) Rob Collard** **(United Kingdom) Hugo Cook**	(United Kingdom) Jack Brown (United Kingdom) Marc Warren
3	Oulton Park	(United Kingdom) No. 7 Beechdean Motorsport Ltd	**(United Kingdom) No. 77 Optimum Motorsport**	(United Kingdom) No. 78 Barwell Motorsport
3	Oulton Park	(United Kingdom) Andrew Howard (United Kingdom) Ross Gunn	**(United Kingdom) Ben Barnicoat** **(United Kingdom) Morgan Tillbrook**	(United Kingdom) Alex Martin (South Africa) Jarrod Waberski
4	Spa-Francorchamps	(United Kingdom) No. 67 Orange Racing by JMH	(United Kingdom) No. 67 Orange Racing by JMH	**(United Kingdom) No. 78 Barwell Motorsport**
4	Spa-Francorchamps	(United Kingdom) Marcus Clutton (United Kingdom) Simon Orange	(United Kingdom) Marcus Clutton (United Kingdom) Simon Orange	**(United Kingdom) Alex Martin** **(South Africa) Jarrod Waberski**
5	Snetterton	(United Kingdom) No. 90 Optimum Motorsport	(United Kingdom) No. 63 Barwell Motorsport	**(United Kingdom) No. 90 Optimum Motorsport**
5	Snetterton	(United Kingdom) Jack Brown (United Kingdom) Marc Warren	(United Kingdom) Rob Collard (United Kingdom) Hugo Cook	**(United Kingdom) Jack Brown** **(United Kingdom) Marc Warren**
6	Snetterton	(United Kingdom) No. 7 Beechdean Motorsport Ltd	**(United Kingdom) No. 77 Optimum Motorsport**	(New Zealand) No. 13 Rodin Motorsport
6	Snetterton	(United Kingdom) Andrew Howard (United Kingdom) Ross Gunn	**(United Kingdom) Ben Barnicoat** **(United Kingdom) Morgan Tillbrook**	(Australia) Josh Buchan (Australia) Cameron Campbell
7	Donington Park	(United Kingdom) No. 44 Century Motorsport	**(United Kingdom) No. 63 Barwell Motorsport**	(Bahrain) No. 15 2 Seas Motorsport
7	Donington Park	(United Kingdom) Jonathon Beeson (United Kingdom) Charles Clark	**(United Kingdom) Rob Collard** **(United Kingdom) Hugo Cook**	(United Kingdom) Charles Dawson (United Kingdom) Aaron Walker
8	Brands Hatch	(Bahrain) No. 18 2 Seas Motorsport	**(United Kingdom) No. 67 Orange Racing by JMH**	(United Kingdom) No. 44 Century Motorsport
8	Brands Hatch	(Hong Kong) Kevin Tse (United Kingdom) Chris Lulham	**(United Kingdom) Marcus Clutton** **(United Kingdom) Simon Orange**	(United Kingdom) Jonathon Beeson (United Kingdom) Charles Clark

=== GT4 ===
Event	Circuit	Pole position	Silver Winners	Pro-Am Winners
1	Silverstone	(United Kingdom) No. 74 Innovation Racing	**(United Kingdom) No. 74 Innovation Racing**	(United Kingdom) No. 42 Toro Verde GT
1	Silverstone	(United Kingdom) Thomas Holland (United Kingdom) Hadley Simpson	**(United Kingdom) Thomas Holland** **(United Kingdom) Hadley Simpson**	(United Kingdom) Jack Mitchell (United Kingdom) Luke Shaw
2	Oulton Park	(United Kingdom) No. 74 Innovation Racing	**(United Kingdom) No. 24 Century Motorsport**	(United Kingdom) No. 42 Toro Verde GT
2	Oulton Park	(United Kingdom) Thomas Holland (United Kingdom) Hadley Simpson	**(United Kingdom) Jack Collins** **(United Kingdom) Branden Templeton**	(United Kingdom) Jack Mitchell (United Kingdom) Luke Shaw
3	Oulton Park	(United Kingdom) No. 42 Toro Verde GT	(United Kingdom) No. 21 MK Racing	**(United Kingdom) No. 27 Grange Racing by FSR**
3	Oulton Park	(United Kingdom) Jack Mitchell (United Kingdom) Luke Shaw	(United Kingdom) Jessica Hawkins (United Kingdom) Will Orton	**(United Kingdom) Darren Turner** **(United Kingdom) Daniel Lavery**
4	Spa-Francorchamps	(United Kingdom) No. 59 Optimum Motorsport	(United Kingdom) No. 59 Optimum Motorsport	**(United Kingdom) No. 27 Grange Racing by FSR**
4	Spa-Francorchamps	(United Kingdom) Josh Stanton (United Kingdom) Mikey Porter	(United Kingdom) Josh Stanton (United Kingdom) Mikey Porter	**(United Kingdom) Darren Turner** **(United Kingdom) Daniel Lavery**
5	Snetterton	(United Kingdom) No. 59 Optimum Motorsport	**(United Kingdom) No. 74 Innovation Racing**	(United Kingdom) No. 27 Grange Racing by FSR
5	Snetterton	(United Kingdom) George Gamble (United Kingdom) Josh Stanton	**(United Kingdom) Thomas Holland** **(United Kingdom) Hadley Simpson**	(United Kingdom) Darren Turner (United Kingdom) Daniel Lavery
6	Snetterton	(United Kingdom) No. 42 Toro Verde GT	**(United Kingdom) No. 59 Optimum Motorsport**	(United Kingdom) No. 27 Grange Racing by FSR
6	Snetterton	(United Kingdom) Jack Mitchell (United Kingdom) Luke Shaw	**(United Kingdom) George Gamble** **(United Kingdom) Josh Stanton**	(United Kingdom) Darren Turner (United Kingdom) Daniel Lavery
7	Donington Park	(United Kingdom) No. 84 Paddock Motorsport	**(United Kingdom) No. 84 Paddock Motorsport**	(United Kingdom) No. 27 Grange Racing by FSR
7	Donington Park	(United Kingdom) Blake Angliss (United Kingdom) Revie Lake	**(United Kingdom) Blake Angliss** **(United Kingdom) Revie Lake**	(United Kingdom) Darren Turner (United Kingdom) Daniel Lavery
8	Brands Hatch	(United Kingdom) No. 59 Optimum Motorsport	**(United Kingdom) No. 59 Optimum Motorsport**	(United Kingdom) No. 27 Grange Racing by FSR
8	Brands Hatch	(United Kingdom) George Gamble (United Kingdom) Josh Stanton	**(United Kingdom) George Gamble** **(United Kingdom) Josh Stanton**	(United Kingdom) Darren Turner (United Kingdom) Daniel Lavery

== Championship standings ==
=== Scoring system ===
Length	1st	2nd	3rd	4th	5th	6th	7th	8th	9th	10th
1 hour	25	18	15	12	10	8	6	4	2	1
2+ hours	37.5	27	22.5	18	15	12	9	6	3	1.5

=== Drivers' championships ===
==== Overall ====
Pos.	Drivers	Team	SIL	OUL		SPA	SNE		DON	BRH	Points
GT3
1	(United Kingdom) Marcus Clutton (United Kingdom) Simon Orange	(United Kingdom) Orange Racing by JMH	4	12	9	**2**	3	2	6	1	138.5
2	(United Kingdom) Ben Barnicoat (United Kingdom) Morgan Tillbrook	(United Kingdom) Optimum Motorsport	7	7	1	3	4	1	Ret	2	132.5
3	(United Kingdom) Rob Collard (United Kingdom) Hugo Cook	(United Kingdom) Barwell Motorsport	Ret	1	4	4	2	4	1	10	125.5
4	(United Kingdom) Alex Martin (South Africa) Jarrod Waberski	(United Kingdom) Barwell Motorsport	5	5	5	1	5	9	5	4	125
5	(United Kingdom) Andrew Howard (United Kingdom) Ross Gunn	(United Kingdom) Beechdean Motorsport Ltd	6	**2**	**2**	11	6	**3**	4	5	110
6	(United Kingdom) Jonathon Beeson (United Kingdom) Charles Clark	(United Kingdom) Century Motorsport	2	8	7	6	11	6	**21**	3	91.5
7	(Hong Kong) Kevin Tse	(Bahrain) 2 Seas Motorsport	Ret	6	3	5	8	7	2	**6**	87
8	(United Kingdom) Jack Brown (United Kingdom) Marc Warren	(United Kingdom) Optimum Motorsport	13	3	6	12	**1**	8	7	DSQ	62.5
9	(United Kingdom) Ben Green	(Bahrain) 2 Seas Motorsport	Ret	6	3	5	8	7			48
10	(United Kingdom) Aaron Walker	(Bahrain) 2 Seas Motorsport	8	10	8	9	10	10	3	8	44.5
11	(United Kingdom) Chris Lulham	(Bahrain) 2 Seas Motorsport							2	**6**	39
12	(United Kingdom) Martin Plowman (United States) Mark Smith	(United Kingdom) Paddock Motorsport	9	4	21	8	Ret	22		9	33
13	(United Kingdom) Charles Dawson	(Bahrain) 2 Seas Motorsport	Ret						3		22.5
14	(Australia) Josh Buchan (Australia) Cameron Campbell	(Australia) Rodin Motorsport	Ret	13	11	10	7	5	9		20.5
15	(United Kingdom) Callum MacLeod (United Kingdom) Mike Price	(United Kingdom) Optimum Motorsport				24	9	12	8	7	17
16	(United Kingdom) Steven Lake	(United Kingdom) Mahiki Racing	10								15
16	(United Kingdom) Steven Lake	(United Kingdom) Orange Racing by JMH				7	22	11			15
17	(United Kingdom) Andrew Gilbert	(Bahrain) 2 Seas Motorsport	8								12
18	(United Kingdom) Ian Loggie	(Bahrain) 2 Seas Motorsport		10	8	9	10	10			10
19	(United Kingdom) Tom Wood	(United Kingdom) Orange Racing by JMH				7					9
20	(United Kingdom) Josh Rowledge	(United Kingdom) Mahiki Racing	10								6
20	(United Kingdom) Duncan Cameron (Republic of Ireland) Matt Griffin	(United Kingdom) Barwell Motorsport	12	9	10						6
–	(United Kingdom) Luke Garlick	(United Kingdom) Mahiki Racing	DNS	11	12						0
–	(United Kingdom) Matt Topham	(United Kingdom) Mahiki Racing		11	12						0
–	(United Kingdom) Dean MacDonald	(United Kingdom) Orange Racing by JMH					22	11			0
–	(United Kingdom) Ed McDermott	(United Kingdom) Mahiki Racing	DNS								0
Drivers ineligible to score points
–	(Australia) Garnet Patterson (Australia) Yasser Shahin	(United Kingdom) Optimum Motorsport	1								0
–	(United Kingdom) Dan Harper (United Kingdom) Darren Leung	(United Kingdom) Paradine Competition	**3**								0
–	(Thailand) Todd Kingsford	(Bahrain) 2 Seas Motorsport								8	0
–	(United Kingdom) Phil Keen (United Kingdom) Ian Loggie	(United Kingdom) Paradine Competition	11								0
–	(United Kingdom) Kiern Jewiss	(Bahrain) 2 Seas Motorsport	Ret								0
–	(Japan) "Bankcy" (United Kingdom) Harry King	(Germany) Herberth Motorsport				WD					0
GT4
1	(United Kingdom) Darren Turner (United Kingdom) Daniel Lavery	(United Kingdom) Grange Racing by FSR	Ret	20	13	13	15	14	13	12	143.5
2	(United Kingdom) Jessica Hawkins (United Kingdom) Will Orton	(United Kingdom) MK Racing	15	15	14	17	13	17	15	13	143.5
3	(United Kingdom) Jack Collins (United Kingdom) Branden Templeton	(United Kingdom) Century Motorsport	17	14	16	16	14	16	11	16	139
4	(United Kingdom) Josh Stanton	(United Kingdom) Optimum Motorsport	16	Ret	DNS	**14**	**16**	13	16	**11**	134
5	(United Kingdom) Thomas Holland (United Kingdom) Hadley Simpson	(United Kingdom) Innovation Racing	**14**	**16**	15	18	12	Ret	12	Ret	127
6	(United Kingdom) George Gamble	(United Kingdom) Optimum Motorsport					**16**	13	16	**11**	84.5
7	(United Kingdom) Blake Angliss (United Kingdom) Revie Lake	(United Kingdom) Mahiki Racing	Ret	17	17						76.5
7	(United Kingdom) Blake Angliss (United Kingdom) Revie Lake	(United Kingdom) Paddock Motorsport				23	Ret	21	**10**	15	76.5
8	(United Kingdom) Jack Mitchell (United Kingdom) Luke Shaw	(United Kingdom) Toro Verde GT	18	18	**Ret**	15	17	**Ret**	21	14	73.5
9	(United Kingdom) Tom Bradshaw (United Kingdom) Ian Duggan	(United Kingdom) Toro Verde GT	21	19	20	19	19	15	18	17	61
10	(United Kingdom) James Townsend	(United Kingdom) Townsend Racing powered by Fox Motorsport	22	23	18	20	21	18	17	18	42
11	(United Kingdom) Joe Wheeler	(United Kingdom) Townsend Racing powered by Fox Motorsport	22	23	18	20	21	18	17		36
12	(United Kingdom) John Hartshorne	(United Kingdom) GBR Stratton Motorsport	19	22	19	21	20	20	19	19	35
13	(United Kingdom) Ernie Graham (United Kingdom) Colin Turkington	(United Kingdom) WSR FlexiFly	20	21	DSQ	22	18	19	20	20	29.5
14	(United Kingdom) Mikey Porter	(United Kingdom) Optimum Motorsport				**14**					27
15	(United Kingdom) Ronan Pearson	(United Kingdom) GBR Stratton Motorsport	19	22	19	21					23
16	(United Kingdom) Luca Hopkinson	(United Kingdom) Optimum Motorsport	16	Ret	DNS						22.5
17	(United Kingdom) Jordan Collard	(United Kingdom) GBR Stratton Motorsport							19	19	6
17	(United Kingdom) Jonny Adam	(United Kingdom) GBR Stratton Motorsport					20	20			6
Drivers ineligible to score points
–	(United Kingdom) Samuel Branston (United Kingdom) James Wareing	(United Kingdom) Innovation Racing							14		0
Pos.	Drivers	Team	SIL	OUL		SPA	SNE		DON	BRH	Points

Colour	Result
Gold	Winner
Silver	Second place
Bronze	Third place
Green	Points classification
Blue	Non-points classification
Blue	Non-classified finish (NC)
Purple	Retired, not classified (Ret)
Red	Did not qualify (DNQ)
Red	Did not pre-qualify (DNPQ)
Black	Disqualified (DSQ)
White	Did not start (DNS)
White	Withdrew (WD)
White	Race cancelled (C)
Blank	Did not practice (DNP)
Blank	Did not arrive (DNA)
Blank	Excluded (EX)

**Bold** indicates pole position

Notes

- † – Drivers did not finish the race but were classified, as they completed more than 75% of the race distance.

===== Pro-Am =====
Pos.	Drivers	Team	SIL	OUL		SPA	SNE		DON	BRH	Points
GT3
1	(United Kingdom) Marcus Clutton (United Kingdom) Simon Orange	(United Kingdom) Orange Racing by JMH	4	12	9	**2**	3	2	6	1	182.5
2	(United Kingdom) Ben Barnicoat (United Kingdom) Morgan Tillbrook	(United Kingdom) Optimum Motorsport	7	7	1	3	**4**	1	Ret	2	151.5
3	(United Kingdom) Andrew Howard (United Kingdom) Ross Gunn	(United Kingdom) Beechdean Motorsport Ltd	6	**2**	**2**	11	6	**3**	4	5	147
4	(United Kingdom) Rob Collard (United Kingdom) Hugo Cook	(United Kingdom) Barwell Motorsport	Ret	1	4	4	2	4	**1**	10	143
5	(Hong Kong) Kevin Tse	(Bahrain) 2 Seas Motorsport	Ret	6	3	5	8	7	2	**6**	110
6	(United Kingdom) Martin Plowman (United States) Mark Smith	(United Kingdom) Paddock Motorsport	9	4	21	8	Ret	22		9	70
7	(United Kingdom) Ben Green	(Bahrain) 2 Seas Motorsport	Ret	6	3	5	8	7			65
8	(United Kingdom) Chris Lulham	(Bahrain) 2 Seas Motorsport							2	**6**	45
9	(United Kingdom) Callum MacLeod (United Kingdom) Mike Price	(United Kingdom) Optimum Motorsport					9	12	8	7	44
10	(United Kingdom) Duncan Cameron (Republic of Ireland) Matt Griffin	(United Kingdom) Barwell Motorsport	12	9	10						31
11	(United Kingdom) Steven Lake (United Kingdom) Dean MacDonald	(United Kingdom) Orange Racing by JMH					22	11			14
Drivers ineligible to score points
–	(United Kingdom) Dan Harper (United Kingdom) Darren Leung	(United Kingdom) Paradine Competition	**3**								0
–	(United Kingdom) Phil Keen (United Kingdom) Ian Loggie	(United Kingdom) Paradine Competition	11								0
–	(United Kingdom) Callum MacLeod (United Kingdom) Mike Price	(United Kingdom) Optimum Motorsport				24					0
–	(United Kingdom) Charles Dawson (United Kingdom) Kiern Jewiss	(Bahrain) 2 Seas Motorsport	Ret								0
–	(Japan) "Bankcy" (United Kingdom) Harry King	(Germany) Herberth Motorsport				WD					0
GT4
1	(United Kingdom) Darren Turner (United Kingdom) Daniel Lavery	(United Kingdom) Grange Racing by FSR	Ret	20	13	13	**15**	14	**13**	12	202.5
2	(United Kingdom) Jack Mitchell (United Kingdom) Luke Shaw	(United Kingdom) Toro Verde GT	**18**	**18**	**Ret**	**15**	17	**DNS**	21	**14**	146.5
3	(United Kingdom) Tom Bradshaw (United Kingdom) Ian Duggan	(United Kingdom) Toro Verde GT	21	19	20	19	19	15	18	17	145.5
4	(United Kingdom) James Townsend	(United Kingdom) Townsend Racing powered by Fox Motorsport	22	23	18	20	21	18	17	18	127
5	(United Kingdom) John Hartshorne	(United Kingdom) GBR Stratton Motorsport	19	22	19	21	20	20	19	19	120
6	(United Kingdom) Joe Wheeler	(United Kingdom) Townsend Racing powered by Fox Motorsport	22	23	18	20	21	18	17		109
7	(United Kingdom) Ernie Graham (United Kingdom) Colin Turkington	(United Kingdom) WSR FlexiFly	20	21	DSQ	22	18	19	20	20	100.5
8	(United Kingdom) Ronan Pearson	(United Kingdom) GBR Stratton Motorsport	19	22	19	21					67
9	(United Kingdom) Jordan Collard	(United Kingdom) GBR Stratton Motorsport							19	19	33
10	(United Kingdom) Jonny Adam	(United Kingdom) GBR Stratton Motorsport					20	20			20
Pos.	Drivers	Team	SIL	OUL		SPA	SNE		DON	BRH	Points

===== Silver =====
Pos.	Drivers	Team	SIL	OUL		SPA	SNE		DON	BRH	Points
GT4
1	(United Kingdom) Jessica Hawkins (United Kingdom) Will Orton	(United Kingdom) MK Racing	15	15	**14**	17	13	17	15	13	170.5
2	(United Kingdom) Jack Collins (United Kingdom) Branden Templeton	(United Kingdom) Century Motorsport	17	14	16	16	14	16	11	16	163
3	(United Kingdom) Josh Stanton	(United Kingdom) Optimum Motorsport	16	Ret	DNS	**14**	**16**	**13**	16	**11**	149.5
4	(United Kingdom) Thomas Holland (United Kingdom) Hadley Simpson	(United Kingdom) Innovation Racing	**14**	**16**	15	18	12	Ret	12	Ret	136
5	(United Kingdom) Blake Angliss (United Kingdom) Revie Lake	(United Kingdom) Mahiki Racing	Ret	17	17						111
5	(United Kingdom) Blake Angliss (United Kingdom) Revie Lake	(United Kingdom) Paddock Motorsport				23	Ret	21	**10**	15	111
6	(United Kingdom) George Gamble	(United Kingdom) Optimum Motorsport					**16**	**13**	16	**11**	89.5
7	(United Kingdom) Mikey Porter	(United Kingdom) Optimum Motorsport				**14**					37.5
8	(United Kingdom) Luca Hopkinson	(United Kingdom) Optimum Motorsport	16	Ret	DNS						22.5
Drivers ineligible to score points
–	(United Kingdom) Samuel Branston (United Kingdom) James Wareing	(United Kingdom) Innovation Racing							14		0
Pos.	Drivers	Team	SIL	OUL		SPA	SNE		DON	BRH	Points

===== Silver-Am =====
Pos.	Drivers	Team	SIL	OUL		SPA	SNE		DON	BRH	Points
GT3
1	(United Kingdom) Alex Martin (South Africa) Jarrod Waberski	(United Kingdom) Barwell Motorsport	**5**	5	**5**	**1**	5	9	5	4	191.5
2	(United Kingdom) Jonathon Beeson (United Kingdom) Charles Clark	(United Kingdom) Century Motorsport	2	8	7	6	11	6	**21**	3	175
3	(United Kingdom) Jack Brown (United Kingdom) Marc Warren	(United Kingdom) Optimum Motorsport	13	**3**	6	12	**1**	8	7	**DSQ**	132.5
4	(United Kingdom) Aaron Walker	(Bahrain) 2 Seas Motorsport	8	10	8	9	10	10	3	8	124
5	(Australia) Josh Buchan (Australia) Cameron Campbell	(Australia) Rodin Motorsport	Ret	13	11	10	7	**5**	9		91
6	(United Kingdom) Ian Loggie	(Bahrain) 2 Seas Motorsport		10	8	9	10	10			64
7	(United Kingdom) Steven Lake	(United Kingdom) Mahiki Racing	10								40.5
7	(United Kingdom) Steven Lake	(United Kingdom) Orange Racing by JMH				7					40.5
8	(United Kingdom) Charles Dawson	(Bahrain) 2 Seas Motorsport							3		37.5
9	(United Kingdom) Andrew Gilbert	(Bahrain) 2 Seas Motorsport	8								22.5
9	(United Kingdom) Tom Wood	(United Kingdom) Orange Racing by JMH				7					22.5
10	(United Kingdom) Josh Rowledge	(United Kingdom) Mahiki Racing	10								18
10	(United Kingdom) Luke Garlick	(United Kingdom) Mahiki Racing	DNS	11	12						18
10	(United Kingdom) Matt Topham	(United Kingdom) Mahiki Racing		11	12						18
–	(United Kingdom) Ed McDermott	(United Kingdom) Mahiki Racing	DNS								0
Drivers ineligible to score points
–	(Australia) Garnet Patterson (Australia) Yasser Shahin	(United Kingdom) Optimum Motorsport	1								0
–	(Thailand) Todd Kingsford	(Bahrain) 2 Seas Motorsport								8	0
Pos.	Drivers	Team	SIL	OUL		SPA	SNE		DON	BRH	Points

===== Masters =====
Pos.	Drivers	Team	Points
GT3
1	(United Kingdom) Rob Collard	(United Kingdom) Barwell Motorsport	151
2	(United Kingdom) Marc Warren	(United Kingdom) Optimum Motorsport	124
3	(United Kingdom) Simon Orange	(United Kingdom) Orange Racing by JMH	107
4	(United Kingdom) Andrew Howard	(United Kingdom) Beechdean Motorsport Ltd	100
5	(United Kingdom) Mike Price	(United Kingdom) Optimum Motorsport	41
6	(United Kingdom) Duncan Cameron	(United Kingdom) Barwell Motorsport	15
Pos.	Drivers	Team	Points

===== SRO GT Academy =====
Rather than on race results, points are awarded largely on the basis of single-driver performance, average pace and fastest laps. The winner of the class will compete in the 2027 24 Hours of Spa.

Pos.	Driver	Team	Points
1	(South Africa) Jarrod Waberski	(United Kingdom) Barwell Motorsport	238
2	(United Kingdom) Charles Clark	(United Kingdom) Century Motorsport	236
3	(United Kingdom) Aaron Walker	(Bahrain) 2 Seas Motorsport	175
4	(United Kingdom) Luke Garlick	(United Kingdom) Mahiki Racing	34
5	(United Kingdom) Josh Rowledge	(United Kingdom) Mahiki Racing	17

==== Teams' championship ====
Pos.	Teams	SIL	OUL		SPA	SNE		DON	BRH	Points
1	(United Kingdom) Barwell Motorsport	5	1	4	1	2	4	1	4	253.5
1	(United Kingdom) Barwell Motorsport	12	5	5	4	5	9	5	10	253.5
2	(United Kingdom) Optimum Motorsport	7	3	1	3	**1**	1	7	2	210
2	(United Kingdom) Optimum Motorsport	13	7	6	12	4	8	8	7	210
3	(United Kingdom) Orange Racing by JMH	4	12	9	**2**	3	2	6	1	147.5
3	(United Kingdom) Orange Racing by JMH				7	22	11			147.5
4	(Bahrain) 2 Seas Motorsport	9	6	3	5	8	7	2	**6**	133.5
4	(Bahrain) 2 Seas Motorsport	Ret	10	8	9	10	10	3	8	133.5
5	(United Kingdom) Beechdean Motorsport Ltd	6	**2**	**2**	11	6	**3**	4	5	110
6	(United Kingdom) Century Motorsport	2	8	7	6	11	6	**21**	3	92.5
7	(United Kingdom) Paddock Motorsport	10	4	21	8	Ret	22		9	33
8	(Australia) Rodin Motorsport	Ret	13	11	10	7	5	9		21.5
9	(United Kingdom) Mahiki Racing	11	11	12						7
9	(United Kingdom) Mahiki Racing	DNS								7
Teams ineligible to score points
–	(United Kingdom) Paradine Competition	**3**								0
–	(United Kingdom) Paradine Competition	8								0
–	(Germany) Herberth Motorsport				WD					0
GT4
1	(United Kingdom) Grange Racing by FSR	Ret	20	13	13	15	14	13	12	143.5
2	(United Kingdom) MK Racing	15	15	14	17	13	17	15	13	143.5
3	(United Kingdom) Century Motorsport	17	14	16	16	14	16	11	16	139
4	(United Kingdom) Toro Verde GT	18	18	20	15	17	15	18	14	134.5
4	(United Kingdom) Toro Verde GT	21	19	**Ret**	19	19	**DNS**	21	17	134.5
5	(United Kingdom) Optimum Motorsport	16	Ret	DNS	**14**	**16**	13	16	**11**	134
6	(United Kingdom) Innovation Racing	**14**	**16**	15	18	12	Ret	12	Ret	127
7	(United Kingdom) Paddock Motorsport				23	Ret	21	**10**	15	54.5
8	(United Kingdom) Townsend Racing powered by Fox Motorsport	22	23	18	20	21	18	17	18	42
9	(United Kingdom) GBR Stratton Motorsport	19	22	19	21	20	20	19	19	35
10	(United Kingdom) WSR FlexiFly	20	21	DSQ	22	18	19	20	20	29.5
11	(United Kingdom) Mahiki Racing	Ret	17	17						22
Pos.	Teams	SIL	OUL		SPA	SNE		DON	BRH	Points

== See also ==
- 2026 GT World Challenge America
- 2026 GT World Challenge Asia
- 2026 GT World Challenge Australia
- 2026 GT World Challenge Europe Endurance Cup
- 2026 GT World Challenge Europe Sprint Cup
- 2026 Intercontinental GT Challenge
