= Ronan Pearson =

British racing driver (born 2001)

- Nationality: (United Kingdom) British
- Born: Ronan George Pearson; 4 October 2001 (age 25) Fife, Scotland

British GT Championship career
- Debut season: 2026
- Current team: GBR Stratton Motorsport
- Car number: 97
- Co-driver: John Hartshorne
- Starts: 4 (4 entries)
- Wins: 0
- Podiums: 0
- Poles: 0
- Fastest laps: 0
- Best finish: 14th in 2026

Previous series
- 2023–2025 2020–2022 2018–2019 2016–2017: British Touring Car Championship; Mini Challenge – JCW; Michelin Clio Cup Series; Junior Saloon Car Championship

Championship titles
- 2019: Michelin Clio Cup Series

Ronan George Pearson (born 4 October 2001) is a Scottish racing driver who last competed in the British GT Championship for GBR Stratton Motorsport. Pearson won the 2019 Michelin Clio Cup Series.

== Career ==
=== Karting ===
Pearson competed in club karting in his native Scotland for six years before his car racing debut, competing in cadet karts before moving up to juniors.

=== Junior Saloon Car Championship ===
Pearson made his car racing debut in 2016, driving in the Junior Saloon Car Championship for six of the nine rounds. He finished 20th in the overall standings. Returning to the championship for a full season in 2017 with Westbourne Motorsport, he finished tenth in the overall standings, with one podium at the Snetterton round.

=== Michelin Clio Cup ===
For 2018, Pearson would step up to the Michelin Clio Cup, driving again for Westbourne Motorsport. He finished on the podium five times throughout the season, also recording two pole positions and four fastest laps.

Pearson returned to the championship in 2019, continuing with Westbourne Motorsport, where he won the championship.

=== Mini Challenge UK ===
In 2020, Pearson moved up to the Mini Challenge UK with Lux Motorsport. With one podium throughout the season, he finished 11th in the overall standings.

Switching to LDR Performance Tuning for the 2021 season, Pearson finished eighth in the standings, with one podium and one fastest lap.

Pearson continued in the championship for the 2022 season, this time switching to EXCELR8 Motorsport, and becoming a development driver for their BTCC team in the process. He won three races across the season, including one at the opening round at Donington Park, and two at his home round at Knockhill, which together with eight podiums, one pole position and five fastest laps, brought him to fourth place in the overall standings.

Pearson initially signed a contract to compete in the 2023 season with EXCELR8 Motorsport, but would not race after his surprise move to the British Touring Car Championship.

=== British Touring Car Championship ===
In November 2022, it was announced that Pearson would compete in the 2023 Mini Challenge UK with EXCELR8. However, after a new sponsorship deal with Macklin Motors, in February 2023 it was announced that he would drive for Bristol Street Motors with EXCELR8 in the 2023 British Touring Car Championship, alongside Tom Ingram, Tom Chilton and Nick Halstead. In the first round of the season at Donington Park, Pearson qualified in a respectable 11th place. In a mixed-conditions race in the second race of the weekend, after starting 24th due to a driving error in the first race, Pearson climbed 21 places to finish third following a successful strategy call, what would have been his first overall podium in the championship. However, he was disqualified from the race after his car failed the post-race ride-height test.

On 21st August 2024, it was announced that Pearson would leave EXCELR8 with immediate effect.

== Racing record ==
=== Racing career summary ===
Season	Series	Team	Races	Wins	Poles	F/Laps	Podiums	Points	Position
2016	Junior Saloon Car Championship	?	12	0	0	0	0	50	20th
2017	Junior Saloon Car Championship	Westbourne Motorsport	14	0	0	0	1	187	10th
2018	Michelin Clio Cup Series	Westbourne Motorsport with Hillnic Homes	?	0	2	4	5	?	?
2019	Michelin Clio Cup Series – Race	Westbourne Motorsport	?	?	?	?	?	?	**1st**
2020	Mini Challenge – JCW	Lux Motorsport	13	0	0	0	1	284	11th
2021	Mini Challenge – JCW	LDR Performance Tuning	19	0	1	0	1	484	8th
2022	Mini Challenge – JCW	EXCELR8 Motorsport	20	3	1	5	8	704	4th
2023	British Touring Car Championship	Bristol Street Motors with EXCELR8	30	0	0	1	0	69	18th
2024	British Touring Car Championship	Team Bristol Street Motors	21	1	0	1	1	77	16th
2025	British Touring Car Championship	Toyota Gazoo Racing UK with IAA	12	0	0	0	0	29	21st
2026	British GT Championship - GT4	GBR Stratton Motorsport	4	0	0	0	0	23	14th

=== Complete British Touring Car Championship results ===
(key) Races in bold indicate pole position (1 point awarded – 2002–2003 all races, 2004–present just in first race) Races in italics indicate fastest lap (1 point awarded all races) * signifies that driver lead race for at least one lap (1 point awarded – 2002 just in feature races, 2003–present all races)

Year	Team	Car	1	2	3	4	5	6	7	8	9	10	11	12	13	14	15	16	17	18	19	20	21	22	23	24	25	26	27	28	29	30	DC	Points
2023	Bristol Street Motors with EXCELR8	Hyundai i30 Fastback N Performance	DON; 1; 24	DON; 2 DSQ	DON; 3; 19	BRH; 1; 16	BRH; 2; 13	BRH; 3; 13	SNE; 1; 12	SNE; 2; 14	SNE; 3 Ret	THR; 1; 15	THR; 2; 19	THR; 3; 19	OUL; 1; 18	OUL; 2; 16	OUL; 3; 17	CRO; 1 NC	CRO; 2; 24	CRO; 3; 19	KNO; 1; 5	KNO; 2; 7	**KNO**; **3**; 4*	DON; 1; 14	DON; 2; 14	DON; 3; 15	SIL; 1; 24	SIL; 2; 11	SIL; 3; 5	BRH; 1; 20	BRH; 2 Ret	BRH; 3; 16	18th	69
2024	Team Bristol Street Motors	Hyundai i30 Fastback N Performance	DON; 1; 5	DON; 2; 17	DON; 3 Ret	BRH; 1; 19	BRH; 2; 11	**BRH**; **3**; 1*	SNE; 1; 11	SNE; 2; 19	SNE; 3; 18	THR; 1; 15	THR; 2; 13	THR; 3; 10	OUL; 1; 12	OUL; 2; 13	OUL; 3; 11	CRO; 1; 16	CRO; 2 Ret	CRO; 3; 10	KNO; 1; 17	KNO; 2 Ret	KNO; 3; 10	DON; 1	DON; 2	DON; 3	SIL; 1	SIL; 2	SIL; 3	BRH; 1	BRH; 2	BRH; 3	16th	77
2025	Toyota Gazoo Racing UK with IAA	Toyota Corolla GR Sport	DON; 1; 13	DON; 2; 18	DON; 3; 14	BRH; 1; 11	BRH; 2; 10	BRH; 3; 17	SNE; 1; 17	SNE; 2; 13	SNE; 3; 8	THR; 1; 16	THR; 2; 14	THR; 3 Ret	OUL; 1	OUL; 2	OUL; 3	CRO; 1	CRO; 2	CRO; 3	KNO; 1	KNO; 2	KNO; 3	DON; 1	DON; 2	DON; 3	SIL; 1	SIL; 2	SIL; 3	BRH; 1	BRH; 2	BRH; 3	21st	29

=== Complete British GT Championship results ===
(key) (Races in bold indicate pole position) (Races in italics indicate fastest lap)

Year	Team	Car	Class	1	2	3	4	5	6	7	8	DC	Points
2026	GBR Stratton Motorsport	Aston Martin Vantage AMR GT4 Evo	GT4	SIL; 1; 19	OUL; 1; 22	OUL; 2; 19	SPA; 1; 21	SNE; 1	SNE; 2	DON; 1	BRH; 1	14th	23
