= Darren Turner =

British racing driver (born 1974)

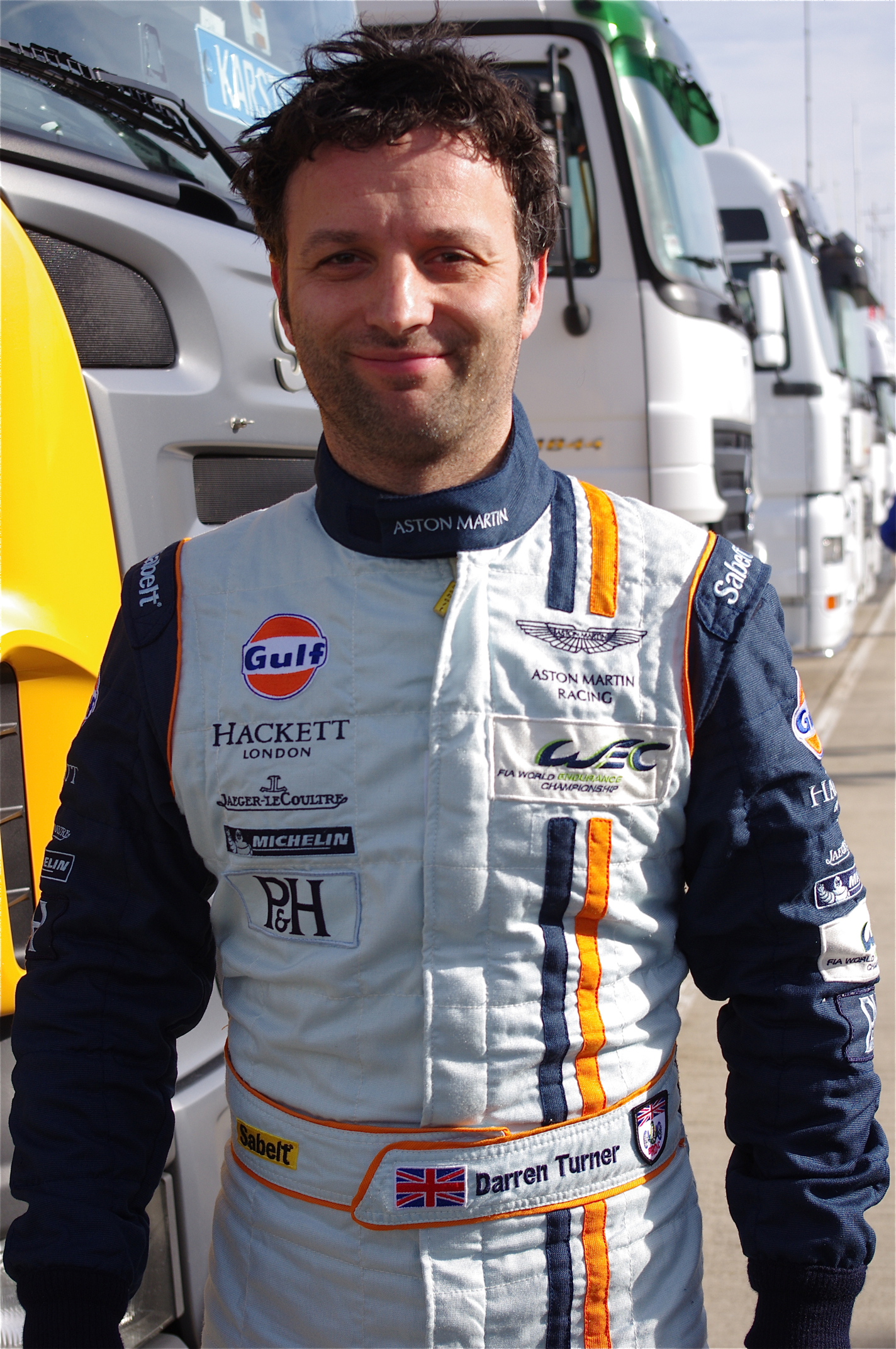
- Darren Turner in 2013
- Nationality: (United Kingdom) British
- Born: 13 April 1974 (age 52) Camberley, Surrey, England, United Kingdom

FIA World Endurance Championship career
- Debut season: 2012
- Current team: Aston Martin Racing
- Categorisation: FIA Platinum (until 2021); FIA Gold (2022–)

24 Hours of Le Mans career
- Years: 2003 –
- Teams: Prodrive Racing, Aston Martin Racing
- Best finish: 5th (2007)
- Class wins: 3 (2007, 2008, 2017)
- Car number: 98
- Starts: 59
- Wins: 8
- Poles: 11
- Fastest laps: 2
- Best finish: 3rd in 2013

Previous series
- 2008–09 2008 2007–09 2006–08 2003, 2005–08 2003, 2007–09 2002 2000–01 2000–01 1999 1998 1997 1997, 1999 1995–96 1994 1993: Rolex Sports Car Series; Formula Ford 1600; Le Mans Series; BTCC; American Le Mans Series; FIA GT Championship; ASCAR; DTM; Formula One testing Italian Formula 3000; Formula Palmer Audi; British Formula 3 Formula One testing Formula Renault UK; Formula Vauxhall Lotus; FFirst Great Britain W. Series

Championship titles
- 2007, 2008 2017 1993: 24 Hours of Le Mans – GT1; 24 Hours of Le Mans – LMGTE Pro; FFirst Great Britain W. Series

Awards
- 1996: McLaren Autosport Award

Darren Turner (born 13 April 1974) is a British racing driver. He races for Aston Martin Racing as a factory driver since 2005, and also works as a high-performance test driver for Aston Martin. He has three class wins at the 24 Hours of Le Mans.

== Career ==
Turner won McLaren Autosport BRDC Young Driver of the Year Award in 1996. He was test driver for McLaren in Formula One from 1999 to 2004, but has raced primarily in touring cars and sportscars since 2000. He spent two years in the DTM for Keke Rosberg's Mercedes-Benz-powered team, also winning several ASCAR races. In 2006, he raced sportscars for Aston Martin, but also competed five rounds of the British Touring Car Championship for SEAT, sharing their second car with James Thompson. In his first drive for the team, he finished third.

Turner remained with the team for 2007, now full-time team-mate to Plato. Luck was again against him at Rockingham – after qualifying on pole the car had an electrical failure before race one. His first win came in race 11 at Croft, with two more at Knockhill.

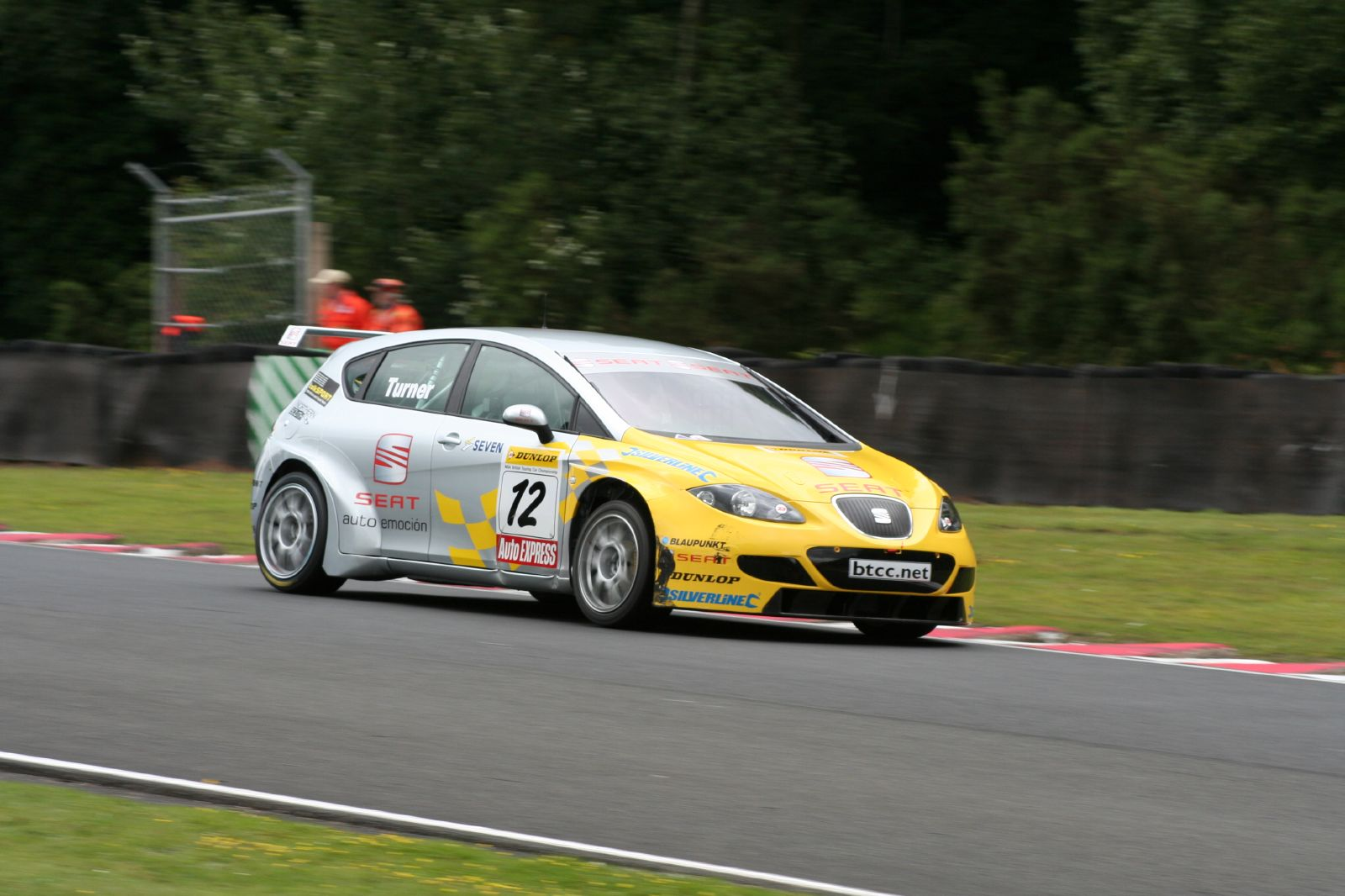
Turner driving for SEAT at the Oulton Park round of the 2007 British Touring Car Championship.

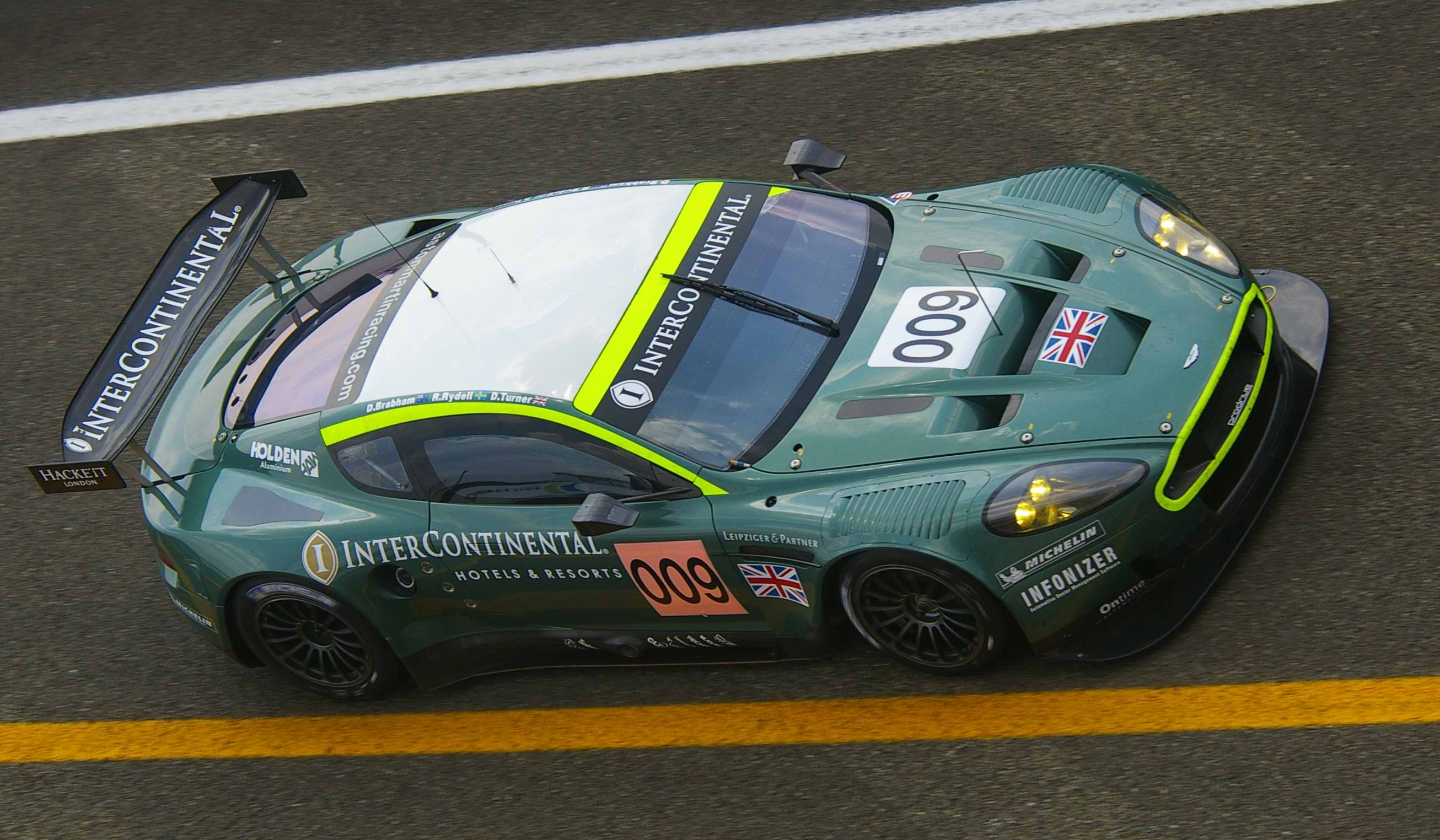
Turner driving for Aston Martin Racing at the 2007 24 Hours of Le Mans, which he won in LMGT1.

As well as driving for SEAT in the BTCC, Turner also competed in the 2007 Le Mans 24 Hours, competing in the GT1 class driving for Prodrive Aston Martin Racing alongside David Brabham and Rickard Rydell. After a tense fight against the Corvette Racing Corvette C6.R of Johnny O'Connell, Jan Magnussen and Ron Fellows, the Aston prevailed to win a Le Mans class race for the first time since the return of Aston Martin to endurance sportscar racing.

Turner opened his 2008 racing season by competing in the Rolex 24 finishing fourth in class and overall sharing a Krohn Racing Pontiac-Riley with Niclas Jonsson and Ricardo Zonta. At the 2008 24 Hours of Le Mans, Turner won the GT1 class (13th overall) driving an Aston Martin DBR9 shared with David Brabham and Antonio García.

Turner also participated in the Gold Coast 600 race as part of the 2011 International V8 Supercars Championship. He entered the race as a replacement driver to Dan Wheldon, who was scheduled to drive in the race but was killed in a 15-car crash at the IndyCar World Championship race at the Las Vegas Motor Speedway, less than a week before the race.

In 2012, Turner competed in the 2012 FIA World Endurance Championship with Aston Martin Racing in the GTE-Pro class Aston Martin Vantage.

In the 80th edition of the 24 Hours of Le Mans in 2012, Turner and the Aston Martin Racing finished third place in the GTE-Pro class along with his co-drivers the German Stefan Mücke and the Mexican Adrián Fernández, their Aston Martin Vantage 4.5 L-V8 covered a total of 332 laps (2,811.65 miles), in the Circuit de la Sarthe without failure or serious mechanical problems. The team also achieved the fastest lap of the category with 3 minutes and 54.928 seconds.

Turner continued to race for Aston Martin Racing in the FIA World Endurance Championship until 2020, notching up numerous victories, the biggest of which was his third 24 Hours of Le Mans win, which came in 2017. He raced the No. 97 Aston Martin Vantage GTE to a class win in GTE Pro, alongside Jonny Adam and Daniel Serra. It was Turner who took the GTE Pro pole position for the 2017 race with a time that broke the lap record.

Turner continues to race, competing in events including the Nürburgring 24 Hours.

As a high-performance development driver for Aston Martin, Turner has worked on the development of cars including the Aston Martin Vulcan and the Aston Martin Valkyrie.

Turner is also a regular competitor at the Goodwood Revival, and in 2018, he was named "Rolex Driver of the Meeting" in recognition of his performances at the event.

== Racing record ==
=== Complete Deutsche Tourenwagen Masters results ===
(key) (Races in bold indicate pole position) (Races in italics indicate fastest lap)

Year	Team	Car	1	2	3	4	5	6	7	8	9	10	11	12	13	14	15	16	17	18	19	20	DC	Points
2000	Team Rosberg	AMG-Mercedes CLK-DTM	HOC; 1; 12	HOC; 2; 8	OSC; 1; 13	OSC; 2 Ret	NOR; 1; 11	NOR; 2; 12	SAC; 1; 8	SAC; 2; 8	NÜR; 1; 15	NÜR; 2; 8	LAU; 1 C	LAU; 2 C	OSC; 1 DNS	OSC; 2 DNS	NÜR; 1; 13	NÜR; 2; 11	HOC; 1; 10	HOC; 2; 6			14th	19
2001	Team Rosberg	AMG-Mercedes CLK-DTM	HOC; QR; 6	HOC; CR; 8	NÜR; QR; 9	NÜR; CR; 16	OSC; QR; 14	OSC; CR; DSQ	SAC; QR; 9	SAC; CR; Ret	NOR; QR; Ret	NOR; CR; 11	LAU; QR; 10	LAU; CR; 9	NÜR; QR; Ret	NÜR; CR; 8	A1R; QR; 14	A1R; CR; 10	ZAN; QR; 15	ZAN; CR; 8	HOC; QR; 9	HOC; CR; 8	15th	15

=== 24 Hours of Le Mans results ===
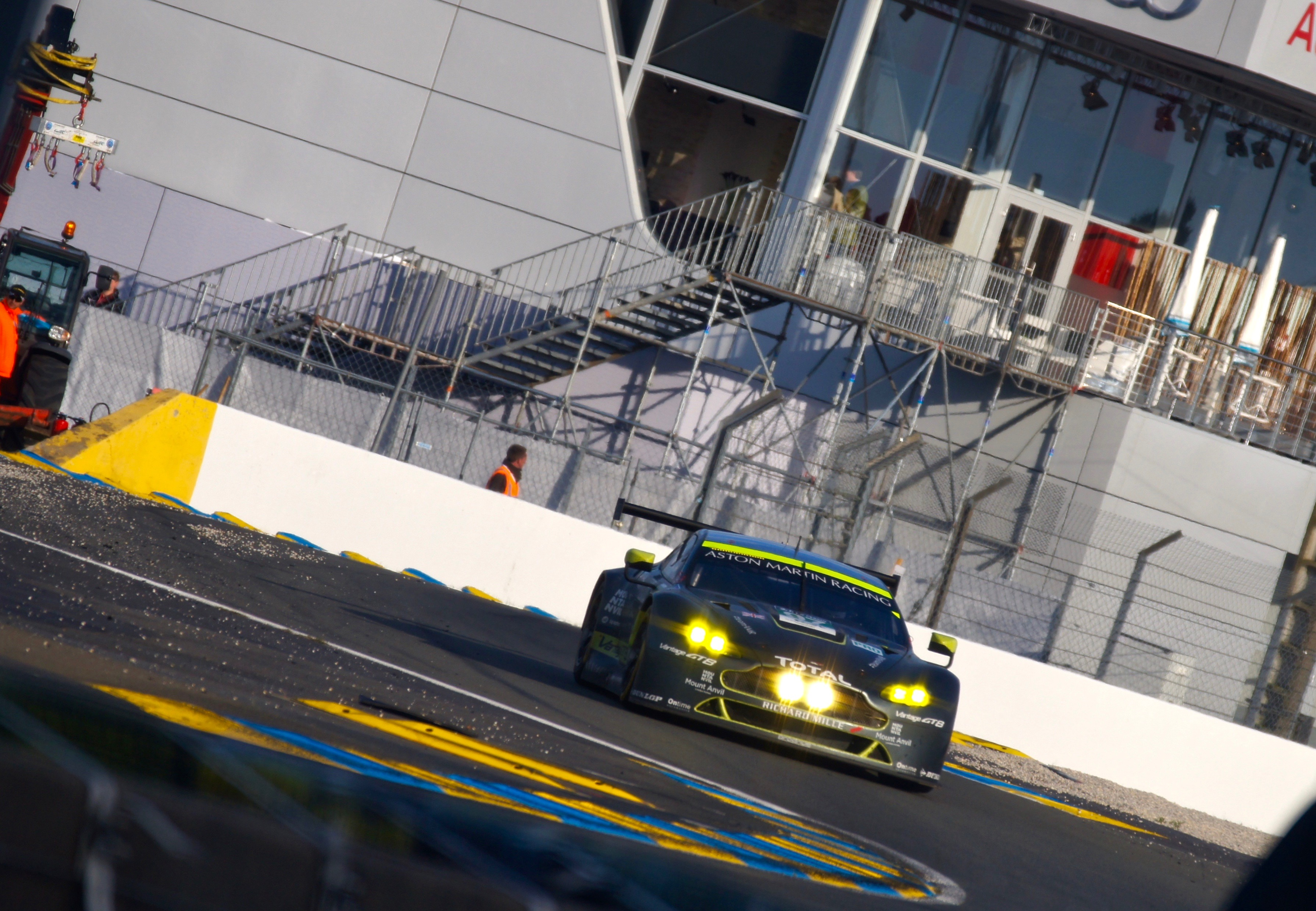
The #97 Aston Martin Vantage V8 during the 2016 24 Hours of Le Mans

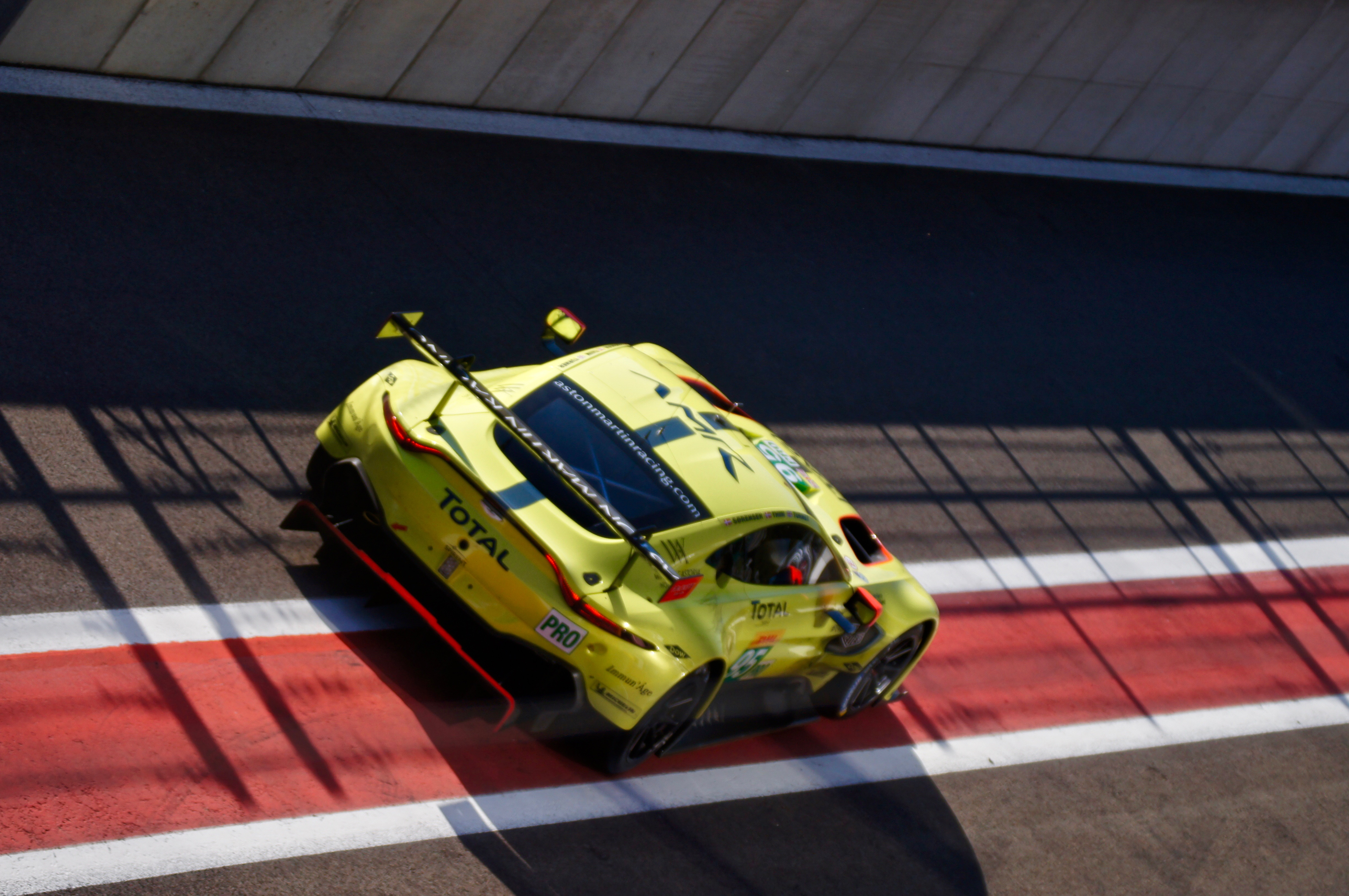
The #95 Aston Martin Vantage AMR at the 6 Hours of Spa 2018

Year	Team	Co-drivers	Car	Class	Laps	Pos.	Class pos.
2003	(United Kingdom) Veloqx Prodrive Racing	(United Kingdom) Anthony Davidson (United Kingdom) Kelvin Burt	Ferrari 550-GTS Maranello	GTS	176	DNF	DNF
2004	(United Kingdom) Prodrive Racing	(United Kingdom) Colin McRae (Sweden) Rickard Rydell	Ferrari 550-GTS Maranello	GTS	329	9th	**3rd**
2005	(United Kingdom) Aston Martin Racing	(Australia) David Brabham (France) Stéphane Sarrazin	Aston Martin DBR9	GT1	333	9th	**3rd**
2006	(United Kingdom) Aston Martin Racing	(Czech Republic) Tomáš Enge (Italy) Andrea Piccini	Aston Martin DBR9	GT1	350	6th	**2nd**
2007	(United Kingdom) Aston Martin Racing	(Australia) David Brabham (Sweden) Rickard Rydell	Aston Martin DBR9	GT1	343	5th	**1st**
2008	(United Kingdom) Aston Martin Racing	(Australia) David Brabham (Spain) Antonio García	Aston Martin DBR9	GT1	344	13th	**1st**
2009	(United Kingdom) Aston Martin Racing	(United Kingdom) Anthony Davidson (Netherlands) Jos Verstappen	Lola-Aston Martin B09/60	LMP1	342	13th	11th
2010	(United Kingdom) Aston Martin Racing	(Denmark) Juan Barazi (United Kingdom) Sam Hancock	Lola-Aston Martin B09/60	LMP1	368	DNF	DNF
2011	(United Kingdom) Aston Martin Racing	(Germany) Stefan Mücke (Austria) Christian Klien	Aston Martin AMR-One	LMP1	4	DNF	DNF
2012	(United Kingdom) Aston Martin Racing	(Germany) Stefan Mücke (Mexico) Adrián Fernández	Aston Martin Vantage GTE	GTE; Pro	332	19th	**3rd**
2013	(United Kingdom) Aston Martin Racing	(Germany) Stefan Mücke (United Kingdom) Peter Dumbreck	Aston Martin Vantage GTE	GTE; Pro	314	17th	**3rd**
2014	(United Kingdom) Aston Martin Racing	(Germany) Stefan Mücke (Brazil) Bruno Senna	Aston Martin Vantage GTE	GTE; Pro	310	35th	6th
2015	(United Kingdom) Aston Martin Racing	(Germany) Stefan Mücke (United Kingdom) Rob Bell	Aston Martin Vantage GTE	GTE; Pro	110	DNF	DNF
2016	(United Kingdom) Aston Martin Racing	(Denmark) Marco Sørensen (Denmark) Nicki Thiim	Aston Martin Vantage GTE	GTE; Pro	338	23rd	5th
2017	(United Kingdom) Aston Martin Racing	(United Kingdom) Jonathan Adam (Brazil) Daniel Serra	Aston Martin Vantage GTE	GTE; Pro	340	17th	**1st**
2018	(United Kingdom) Aston Martin Racing	(Denmark) Nicki Thiim (Denmark) Marco Sørensen	Aston Martin Vantage AMR	GTE; Pro	339	23rd	8th
2019	(United Kingdom) Aston Martin Racing	(Denmark) Nicki Thiim (Denmark) Marco Sørensen	Aston Martin Vantage AMR	GTE; Pro	132	DNF	DNF

=== Complete British Touring Car Championship results ===
(key) (Races in bold indicate pole position – 1 point awarded in first race) (Races in italics indicate fastest lap – 1 point awarded all races) (* signifies that driver lead race for at least one lap – 1 point awarded all races)

Year	Team	Car	1	2	3	4	5	6	7	8	9	10	11	12	13	14	15	16	17	18	19	20	21	22	23	24	25	26	27	28	29	30	Pos	Pts
2006	SEAT Sport UK	SEAT León	BRH; 1	BRH; 2	BRH; 3	MON; 1	MON; 2	MON; 3	OUL; 1	OUL; 2	OUL; 3	THR; 1; 3	THR; 2; 5	THR; 3 Ret	CRO; 1	CRO; 2	CRO; 3	DON; 1; 12	DON; 2; 9	**DON**; **3**; 4	SNE; 1	SNE; 2	SNE; 3	KNO; 1; 10	KNO; 2 DSQ	KNO; 3; 4	BRH; 1 Ret	BRH; 2 Ret	BRH; 3 DNS	SIL; 1 Ret	SIL; 2; 10	SIL; 3; 6	14th	41
2007	SEAT Sport UK	SEAT León	BRH; 1 Ret	BRH; 2; 4	BRH; 3 DSQ	**ROC**; **1** Ret	ROC; 2; 6	ROC; 3; 3	THR; 1; 3	THR; 2 Ret	THR; 3; 6	CRO; 1; 4	CRO; 2; 1*	CRO; 3; 5	OUL; 1 Ret	OUL; 2; 7	OUL; 3; 3	DON; 1; 12	DON; 2; 6	DON; 3; 9	SNE; 1; 6	SNE; 2; 4	SNE; 3; 9	BRH; 1; 3	BRH; 2 Ret	BRH; 3; 15	**KNO**; **1**; 1*	**KNO**; **2**; 1*	KNO; 3; 7	THR; 1; 18	THR; 2; 11	THR; 3; 6	6th	160
2008	SEAT Sport UK	SEAT León TDI	BRH; 1; 4	BRH; 2; 5	BRH; 3 Ret	ROC; 1; 2	ROC; 2; 3*	ROC; 3 Ret	DON; 1; 19	DON; 2; 4	DON; 3; 1*	THR; 1; 6	THR; 2; 4	THR; 3; 16	**CRO**; **1**; 15	CRO; 2; 9	CRO; 3 Ret	SNE; 1; 2	SNE; 2; 19*	SNE; 3; 16	OUL; 1; 6	OUL; 2 Ret	OUL; 3; 16	**KNO**; **1** Ret	KNO; 2; 8	KNO; 3; 1*	SIL; 1; 3	SIL; 2 Ret	SIL; 3; 19	BRH; 1; 7	BRH; 2 Ret	BRH; 3; 12	8th	133

=== Complete GT1 World Championship results ===
Year	Team	Car	1	2	3	4	5	6	7	8	9	10	11	12	13	14	15	16	17	18	19	20	Pos	Points
2010	Young Driver AMR	Aston Martin DBR9	ABU; QR; Ret	ABU; CR; 11	SIL; QR; 4	SIL; CR; EX	BRN; QR; 2	BRN; CR; 2	PRI; QR; 10	PRI; CR; 16	SPA; QR; 10	SPA; CR; 6	NÜR; QR; 1	NÜR; CR; 1	ALG; QR; 4	ALG; CR; 10	NAV; QR; Ret	NAV; CR; 4	INT; QR; 2	INT; CR; 10	SAN; QR; 10	SAN; CR; 15	4th	104
2011	Young Driver AMR	Aston Martin DBR9	ABU; QR; Ret	ABU; CR; 5	ZOL; QR; Ret	ZOL; CR; 7	ALG; QR; 4	ALG; CR; 2	SAC; QR; 3	SAC; CR; 3	SIL; QR; Ret	SIL; CR; Ret	NAV; QR; 6	NAV; CR; Ret	PRI; QR; 3	PRI; CR; 2	ORD; QR; 7	ORD; CR; 5	BEI; QR; 2	BEI; CR; 1	SAN; QR; DNS	SAN; CR; DNS	2nd	120

=== Complete V8 Supercar results ===
Year	Team	Car	1	2	3	4	5	6	7	8	9	10	11	12	13	14	15	16	17	18	19	20	21	22	23	24	25	26	27	28	29	30	31	Final pos	Points	Ref
2011	Holden Racing Team	Holden VE Commodore	YMC; R1	YMC; R2	ADE; R3	ADE; R4	HAM; R5	HAM; R6	PER; R7	PER; R8	PER; R9	WIN; R10	WIN; R11	HDV; R12	HDV; R13	TOW; R14	TOW; R15	QLD; R16	QLD; R17	QLD; R18	PHI; Q	PHI; R19	BAT; R20	SUR; R21; 14	SUR; R22; 6	SYM; R23	SYM; R24	SAN; R25	SAN; R26	SYD; R27	SYD; R28			59th	165	
2012	Holden Racing Team	Holden VE Commodore	ADE; R1	ADE; R2	SYM; R3	SYM; R4	HAM; R5	HAM; R6	PER; R7	PER; R8	PER; R9	PHI; R10	PHI; R11	HDV; R12	HDV; R13	TOW; R14	TOW; R15	QLD; R16	QLD; R17	SMP; R18	SMP; R19	SAN; Q	SAN; R20	BAT; R21	SUR; R22; 7	SUR; R23; 17	YMC; R24	YMC; R25	YMC; R26	WIN; R27	WIN; R28	SYD; R29	SYD; R30	NC	0 +	

+ Not eligible for points.

=== Complete FIA World Endurance Championship results ===
(key) (Races in bold indicate pole position; races in italics indicate fastest lap)

Year	Entrant	Class	Car	Engine	1	2	3	4	5	6	7	8	9	Rank	Points
2012	Aston Martin Racing	LMGTE Pro	Aston Martin Vantage GTE	Aston Martin 4.5 L V8	SEB; 3	SPA; Ret	LMS; 3	SIL; 2	**SÃO**; 2	**BHR**; 2	FUJ; 3	**SHA**; 1		35th	7
2013	Aston Martin Racing	LMGTE Pro	Aston Martin Vantage GTE	Aston Martin 4.5 L V8	**SIL**; 1	SPA; 4	LMS; 3	SÃO; 2	COA; Ret	**FUJ**; 1	**SHA**; 1	BHR; Ret		3rd	125.5
2014	Aston Martin Racing	LMGTE Pro	Aston Martin Vantage GTE	Aston Martin 4.5 L V8	SIL; 3	SPA; 4	LMS; 10	COA; 1	FUJ; 9	**SHA**; Ret	**BHR**; 2	**SÃO**; 1		5th	102
2015	Aston Martin Racing	LMGTE Pro	Aston Martin Vantage GTE	Aston Martin 4.5 L V8	SIL; 5	SPA; 5	LMS; Ret	NÜR; 6	COA; 6	FUJ; 6	SHA; 6	BHR; 3		10th	67
2016	Aston Martin Racing	LMGTE Pro	Aston Martin Vantage GTE	Aston Martin 4.5 L V8	SIL; 3	SPA; Ret	LMS; 2	NÜR; 5	MEX; 1	COA; 5	FUJ; 6	SHA; Ret	**BHR**; 5	6th	115
2017	Aston Martin Racing	LMGTE Pro	Aston Martin Vantage GTE	Aston Martin 4.5 L V8	SIL; 7	SPA; 7	**LMS**; 1	NÜR; 7	MEX; Ret	COA; 5	FUJ; 6	SHA; 7	BHR; 6	7th	101
2018–19	Aston Martin Racing	LMGTE Pro	Aston Martin Vantage AMR	Aston Martin 4.0 L Turbo V8	SPA; 7	LMS; 5	SIL	FUJ	SHA	SEB; 9	SPA	**LMS**; Ret		18th	25
2019–20	Aston Martin Racing	LMGTE Am	Aston Martin Vantage AMR	Aston Martin 4.0 L Turbo V8	SIL; 2	FUJ; 11	SHA; 3	BHR; 2	COA; 2	SPA	LMS	BHR		11th	78.5

=== Complete IMSA SportsCar Championship results ===
(key) (Races in bold indicate pole position) (Races in italics indicate fastest lap)

Year	Team	Class	Make	Engine	1	2	3	4	5	6	7	8	9	10	11	12	Pos.	Points	Ref
2014	Aston Martin Racing	GTLM	Aston Martin Vantage GTE	Aston Martin 4.5 V8	DAY; 8	SEB	LBH	LGA	WGL	MOS	IMS	ELK	VIR	COA	PET		40th	24	
2015	Aston Martin Racing	GTLM	Aston Martin Vantage GTE	Aston Martin 4.5 V8	DAY; 6	SEB; 6	LBH	LGA	WGL	MOS	ELK	VIR	COA	PET			19th	52	
2020	Heart of Racing Team	GTD	Aston Martin Vantage AMR GT3	Aston Martin 4.0 L Turbo V8	DAY	DAY	SEB	ELK	VIR	ATL; 6	MDO	CLT	PET; 11	LGA	SEB; 2		31st	77	
2021	Heart of Racing Team	GTD	Aston Martin Vantage AMR GT3	Aston Martin 4.0 L Turbo V8	DAY; 5	SEB	MDO	DET	WGL	WGL	LIM	ELK	LGA	LBH	VIR	PET	49th	285	
2022	Heart of Racing Team	GTD	Aston Martin Vantage AMR GT3	Aston Martin 4.0 L Turbo V8	DAY; 9	SEB	LBH	LGA	MDO	DET	WGL	MOS	LIM	ELK	VIR	PET	59th	230	
2023	Heart of Racing Team	GTD	Aston Martin Vantage AMR GT3	Aston Martin 4.0 L Turbo V8	DAY; 1	SEB	LBH	LGA	WGL	MOS	LIM	ELK	VIR	IMS	PET		44th	375	
2025	Heart of Racing Team	GTD	Aston Martin Vantage AMR GT3 Evo	Aston Martin 4.0 L Turbo V8	DAY	SEB	LBH	LGA; 12	WGL	MOS	ELK	VIR	IMS	PET			76th	206	

=== Complete European Le Mans Series results ===
Year	Entrant	Class	Chassis	Engine	1	2	3	4	5	6	Rank	Points
2016	Aston Martin Racing	LMGTE	Aston Martin Vantage GTE	Aston Martin 4.5 L V8	SIL; 1	IMO; 5	RBR; 4	**LEC**; 3	SPA; 5	EST; 1	1st	98
2017	Beechdean AMR	LMGTE	Aston Martin Vantage GTE	Aston Martin 4.5 L V8	SIL; 3	MNZ; 3	RBR; 6	LEC; 5	SPA; 3	ALG; 4	5th	75

=== Complete British GT Championship results ===
(key) (Races in bold indicate pole position) (Races in italics indicate fastest lap)

Year	Team	Car	Class	1	2	3	4	5	6	7	8	9	DC	Points
2018	Beechdean AMR	Aston Martin V12 Vantage GT3	GT3	OUL; 1; 2	OUL; 2; 6	ROC; 1; 3	SNE; 1; 11	SNE; 2; 2	SIL; 1; 9	SPA; 1 Ret	BRH; 1; 4	DON; 1; 5	5th	102.5
2019	M2 Competition	Aston Martin Vantage AMR GT3	GT3	OUL; 1	OUL; 2	SNE; 1	SNE; 2	SIL; 1	DON; 1	SPA; 1; 13	BRH; 1	DON; 1	NC†	0†
2021	Newbridge Motorsport	Aston Martin Vantage AMR GT4	GT4	BRH; 1	SIL; 1; 14	DON; 1	SPA; 1; 7	SNE; 1; 20	SNE; 2; 19	**OUL**; **1**; 11	**OUL**; **2**; 19	DON; 1; 17	4th	106.5
2022	Newbridge Motorsport	Aston Martin Vantage AMR GT4	GT4	OUL; 1; 20	**OUL**; **2**; 15	SIL; 1; 15	DON; 1; 24	SNE; 1; 19	SNE; 2; 18	SPA; 1; 18	BRH; 1; 11	DON; 1; 19	2nd	163
2026	Grange Racing by FSR	Aston Martin Vantage AMR GT4 Evo	GT4	SIL; 1 Ret	OUL; 1; 20	OUL; 2; 13	SPA; 1; 13	SNE; 1; 15	SNE; 2; 14	DON; 1; 13	BRH; 1; 12		1st	143.5

^{†} As Turner was a guest driver, he was ineligible to score points.

=== Complete Super GT results ===
(key) (Races in bold indicate pole position) (Races in italics indicate fastest lap)

Year	Team	Car	Class	1	2	3	4	5	6	7	8	DC	Points
2019	D'station Racing AMR	Aston Martin Vantage AMR GT3	GT300	OKA	FUJ	SUZ	CHA	FUJ; 11	AUT	SUG	MOT	NC	0

Sporting positions
Preceded by Mikkel Mac; Johnny Laursen; Andrea Rizzoli	European Le Mans Series; LMGTE Champion; 2016; With: Alex MacDowall & Andrew Howard	Succeeded by Jody Fannin; Robert Smith
Preceded by Mia Flewitt; Euan Hankey	British GT Championship; GT4 Pro-Am Champion; 2021-2022; With: Matt Topham	Succeeded by Michael Johnston; Chris Salkeld
Preceded by Jack Brown; Marc Warren	British GT Championship; GT4 Champion; 2026; With: Daniel Lavery	Succeeded by Incumbent
Preceded by Jack Brown; Marc Warren	British GT Championship; GT4 Pro-Am Champion; 2026; With: Daniel Lavery	Succeeded by Incumbent
Awards
Preceded by Jonny Kane	McLaren Autosport BRDC Award; 1996	Succeeded by Andrew Kirkaldy
