= 1997 British Touring Car Championship =

40th season of the British Touring Car Championship

1997 BTCC season

Seasons
- ← 1996 1998 →

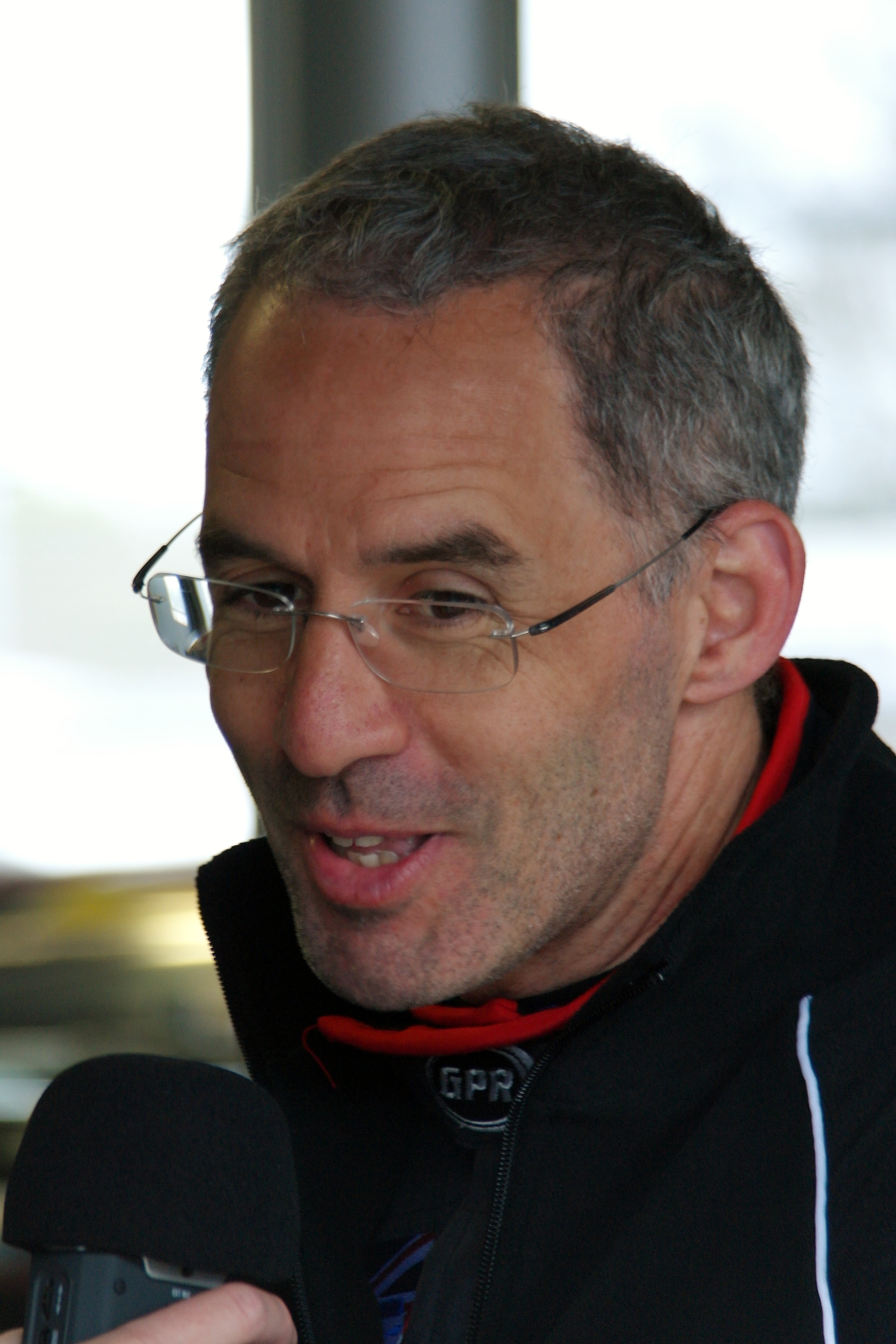
Alain Menu, the 1997 British Touring Car Champion.

The 1997 Auto Trader RAC British Touring Car Championship was won by Alain Menu of the Williams Renault Dealer Racing team, driving a Renault Laguna. Menu dominated the year, setting a record of 12 wins during the season. The runner up was Frank Biela of Audi Sport UK in an Audi A4 Quattro. Third place was Menu's teammate, Jason Plato. In the independent class the championship was won by Robb Gravett in a Honda Accord.

== Season summary ==
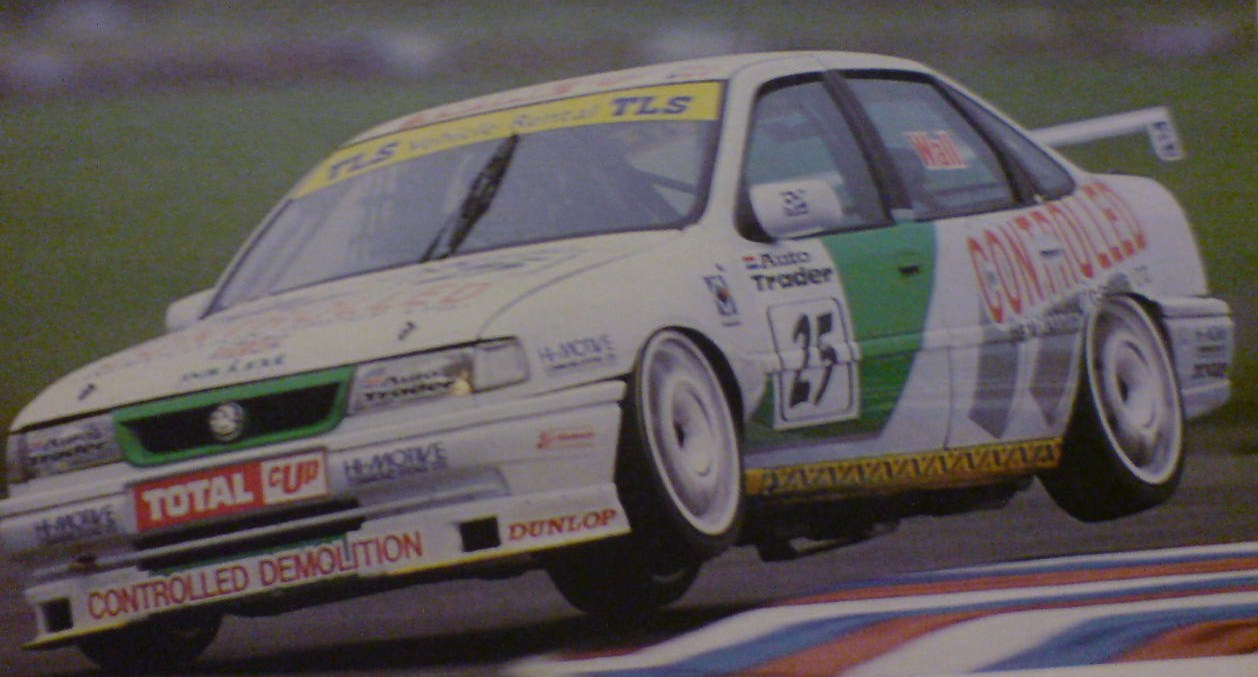
Jamie Wall contesting the championship in a Vauxhall Cavalier

Defending manufacturers champions Audi retained the same driver line up for 1997, with defending drivers champion Frank Biela again partnering John Bintcliffe. Pre-season was not without controversy for Audi as had been announced that due to their dominance of much of 1996, a further weight penalty would be applied to both of their A4 Quattros a penalty that would subsequently be relaxed by 30kg at Oulton Park. Biela would secure 5 victories during the season to finish runner up to eventual champion Menu although he was never a serious threat for the title such was the Renault drivers dominance. Bintcliffe again finished 7th overall, scoring his first victory at Knockhill, repeating the feat at Thruxton.

Williams Renault, now into their third season running the Laguna, had a new driver in the form of future double BTCC champion Jason Plato, replacing 1991 Champion Will Hoy. Plato would drive alongside Swiss ace Alain Menu, three times a runner-up in the BTCC and now into his fifth year with Renault. Plato made history by taking pole position in his first 3 races but it was Menu who would go on to dominate the season with 12 victories, leading the standings throughout and wrapping up the title at Snetterton with 6 races to go. Plato's first victory came in that Snetterton race, the second coming in the final race of the year at Silverstone. The team wrapped up the manufacturers and teams championships.

The TWR backed Volvo squad, after an ultimately disappointing 1996 despite 5 wins, introduced a new car for 1997, replacing the 850 model with the sleek new S40. Swede Rickard Rydell, again drove alongside former Ford driver Kelvin Burt. The sole victory came for Rydell at Brands Hatch in August whilst Kelvin Burt scored just one podium in the opening race of the year

For the 1997 season, Honda’s Accord entries were operated by the Prodrive team. The driver line-up consisted of James Thompson, who joined from Vauxhall, and Gabriele Tarquini, the 1994 BTCC champion and former Formula One driver. Honda had shown improved performance toward the end of the 1996 season. In 1997, the team recorded one race victory for Thompson and one for Tarquini.

After a limited effort in 1996 Nissan re-entered the championship with a full blown manufacturer backed team. RML, who had run Vauxhall's effort since 1994, fielded a pair of brand new Primeras for David Leslie and Anthony Reid, the latter making his debut in the championship. Reliability was an issue but 5 podium finishes hinted at what was to come in 1998.

Vauxhall, after a difficult 1996 with just a solitary win for James Thompson, replaced the outgoing Yorkshireman with Derek Warwick, who joined both as a driver and team manager of the new-look Triple Eight Vectras after a somewhat low-key first BTCC season with Alfa in 1995. Double champion John Cleland would drive for Vauxhall for the ninth straight year in the BTCC. The team started the season with 1996 cars re-engineered by Triple Eight before being replaced by the new cars at Knockhill. The car suffered after a miscalculation with the aerodynamics that meant it lacked down force and did not work its tyres hard enough. BTCC rules meant that unlike in STW this was unable to be rectified.

Ford elected to introduce the latest shape Mondeo, and the driver line-up looked formidable on paper, with 1991 champion Will Hoy joining twice winner of the Touring Car World Cup New Zealander Paul Radisich. The cars were again built by Reynard Motorsport and run by West Surrey Racing. Whilst results were better than 1996 the cars continued to suffer from poor reliability and Ford finished the season 7th in the manufacturer standings.

After two seasons running the Honda factory effort Motorsport Developments (MSD) joined forces with Peugeot, now into their second season running the 406. They maintained the experienced duo of Patrick Watts and 1992 champion Tim Harvey and proved to be significantly more competitive than the previous season with Harvey taking a pair of 2nd places in wet conditions at Thruxton and Donington.

The independents championship was one of the most keenly contested for years. Defending independents champion Lee Brookes switched from a Toyota to a Peugeot, whilst rookie Jamie Wall drove the Mint Motorsport Vauxhall Cavalier used by Richard Kaye in 1996.

Matt Neal would again enter in his Team Dynamics built Mondeo, however the team looking to have closer ties to a manufacturer switched to a Nissan Primera mid season. Neal won the class six times, as many as eventual champion Gravett and was often mixing it with the works cars however inconsistency meant he was never in the championship battle.

1990 Champion Robb Gravett, having run selected rounds in 1996, returned with a Honda entered by Graham Hathaway and went on to secure the title, Whilst Scot Colin Gallie ran a 1994 BMW 318i entered by Dave Cook. Ian Heward again entered his 1993 ex RML Vauxhall Cavalier but often failed to qualify. Swedish Touring Car Championship regular Jan Brunstedt entered the early rounds at Silverstone but was lapped in both races.

Former Peugeot works driver Eugene O'Brien intended to return in a Honda Accord, run by YAP Motorsport, but this plan fell through.

== Tourist Trophy ==
On October 18/19 the 1997 Tourist Trophy took place at Donington Park featuring an all-new format. One qualifying session on Saturday set the grid for the first of two 20-lap qualifying heats with the grid for the second race a reverse of the first. The grid for the 25 lap final was then decided by each driver's aggregate performance in the two heats.

== Team and drivers ==
Team	Car	No.	Drivers	Rounds
Manufacturers
(United Kingdom) Audi Sport UK	Audi A4 quattro	1	(Germany) Frank Biela	All
(United Kingdom) Audi Sport UK	Audi A4 quattro	7	(United Kingdom) John Bintcliffe	All
(France) Williams Renault Dealer Racing	Renault Laguna	2	(Switzerland) Alain Menu	All
(France) Williams Renault Dealer Racing	Renault Laguna	22	(United Kingdom) Jason Plato	All
(Sweden) Volvo S40 Racing	Volvo S40	3	(Sweden) Rickard Rydell	All
(Sweden) Volvo S40 Racing	Volvo S40	11	(United Kingdom) Kelvin Burt	All
(United Kingdom) Vodafone Nissan Racing	Nissan Primera GT	4	(United Kingdom) David Leslie	All
(United Kingdom) Vodafone Nissan Racing	Nissan Primera GT	23	(United Kingdom) Anthony Reid	All
(United Kingdom) Vauxhall Sport	Vauxhall Vectra	8	(United Kingdom) John Cleland	All
(United Kingdom) Vauxhall Sport	Vauxhall Vectra	88	(United Kingdom) Derek Warwick	All
(New Zealand) Team Mondeo with Reynard	Ford Mondeo	9	(United Kingdom) Will Hoy	All
(New Zealand) Team Mondeo with Reynard	Ford Mondeo	15	(New Zealand) Paul Radisich	All
(Japan) Team Honda Sport	Honda Accord	10	(United Kingdom) James Thompson	All
(Japan) Team Honda Sport	Honda Accord	20	(Italy) Gabriele Tarquini	All
(France) Esso Ultron Team Peugeot	Peugeot 406	12	(United Kingdom) Tim Harvey	All
(France) Esso Ultron Team Peugeot	Peugeot 406	14	(United Kingdom) Patrick Watts	All
Independents
(United Kingdom) Brookes Motorsport	Peugeot 406	17	(United Kingdom) Lee Brookes	All
(Sweden) Janco Motorsport	Opel Vectra	18	(Sweden) Jan Brunstedt	2
(United Kingdom) Team DCRS	BMW 318i	19	(United Kingdom) Colin Gallie	All
(United Kingdom) Mint Motorsport	Vauxhall Cavalier	25	(United Kingdom) Jamie Wall	All
(United Kingdom) ProMotor Sport	Vauxhall Cavalier	28	(United Kingdom) Ian Heward	6, 9–10, 12
(United Kingdom) Rock-It Cargo	Honda Accord	29	(United Kingdom) Robb Gravett	2–12
(United Kingdom) Team Dynamics	Ford Mondeo	77	(United Kingdom) Matt Neal	1–5
(United Kingdom) Team Dynamics	Nissan Primera eGT	77	(United Kingdom) Matt Neal	6–12

=== RAC Tourist Trophy ===
Team	Car	No.	Drivers
Manufacturers
(France) Williams Renault Dealer Racing	Renault Laguna	1	(Switzerland) Alain Menu
(France) Williams Renault Dealer Racing	Renault Laguna	3	(United Kingdom) Jason Plato
(United Kingdom) Audi Sport UK	Audi A4 quattro	2	(Germany) Frank Biela
(United Kingdom) Audi Sport UK	Audi A4 quattro	7	(United Kingdom) John Bintcliffe
(United Kingdom) Audi Sport UK	Audi A4	18	(France) Yvan Muller
(Sweden) Volvo S40 Racing	Volvo S40	4	(Sweden) Rickard Rydell
(Sweden) Volvo S40 Racing	Volvo S40	14	(Germany) Armin Hahne
(United Kingdom) Vodafone Nissan Racing	Nissan Primera GT	8	(United Kingdom) David Leslie
(United Kingdom) Vodafone Nissan Racing	Nissan Primera GT	11	(United Kingdom) Anthony Reid
(United Kingdom) Vodafone Nissan Racing	Nissan Primera GT	17	(United Kingdom) Paula Cook
(United Kingdom) Vauxhall Sport	Vauxhall Vectra	12	(United Kingdom) John Cleland
(United Kingdom) Team Mondeo	Ford Mondeo	15	(New Zealand) Paul Radisich
(United Kingdom) Team Mondeo	Ford Mondeo	16	(United Kingdom) Will Hoy
(Japan) Team Honda Sport	Honda Accord	21	(New Zealand) Aaron Slight
(Japan) Team Honda Sport	Honda Accord	22	(United Kingdom) Jonny Kane
Independents
(Germany) Abt Sportsline	Audi A4 quattro	23	(Germany) Christian Abt
(Germany) Abt Sportsline	Audi A4 quattro	24	(Denmark) Kris Nissen
(United Kingdom) Mint Motorsport	Vauxhall Cavalier	25	(United Kingdom) Tim Sugden
(Sweden) Janco Motorsport	Opel Vectra	27	(Sweden) Jan Brunstedt
(Norway) Linnerud Racing	Opel Vectra	28	(Norway) Tord Linnerud
(United Kingdom) Team Dynamics	Ford Mondeo	77	(United Kingdom) Matt Neal
(United Kingdom) Team Dynamics	Nissan Primera eGT	78	(Finland) Kari Mäkinen

== Race calendar and results ==
All races were held in the United Kingdom.

Round		Circuit	Date	Pole position	Fastest lap	Winning driver	Winning team	Winning independent
1	R1	Donington Park (Grand Prix), Leicestershire	31 March	(United Kingdom) Jason Plato	(Switzerland) Alain Menu	(Switzerland) Alain Menu	Williams Renault Dealer Racing	(United Kingdom) Colin Gallie
1	R2	Donington Park (Grand Prix), Leicestershire	31 March	(United Kingdom) Jason Plato	(Switzerland) Alain Menu	(Switzerland) Alain Menu	Williams Renault Dealer Racing	(United Kingdom) Colin Gallie
2	R3	Silverstone Circuit (International), Northamptonshire	20 April	(United Kingdom) Jason Plato	(United Kingdom) Jason Plato	(Switzerland) Alain Menu	Williams Renault Dealer Racing	(United Kingdom) Robb Gravett
2	R4	Silverstone Circuit (International), Northamptonshire	20 April	(Switzerland) Alain Menu	(Switzerland) Alain Menu	(Switzerland) Alain Menu	Williams Renault Dealer Racing	(United Kingdom) Robb Gravett
3	R5	Thruxton Circuit, Hampshire	5 May	(Switzerland) Alain Menu	(United Kingdom) James Thompson	(Germany) Frank Biela	Audi Sport UK	(United Kingdom) Matt Neal
3	R6	Thruxton Circuit, Hampshire	5 May	(Switzerland) Alain Menu	(United Kingdom) James Thompson	(Italy) Gabriele Tarquini	Team Honda Sport	(United Kingdom) Matt Neal
4	R7	Brands Hatch (Indy), Kent	18 May	(Switzerland) Alain Menu	(Switzerland) Alain Menu	(Switzerland) Alain Menu	Williams Renault Dealer Racing	(United Kingdom) Robb Gravett
4	R8	Brands Hatch (Indy), Kent	18 May	(Italy) Gabriele Tarquini	(Switzerland) Alain Menu	(United Kingdom) James Thompson	Team Honda Sport	(United Kingdom) Robb Gravett
5	R9	Oulton Park (Fosters), Cheshire	26 May	(Switzerland) Alain Menu	(Switzerland) Alain Menu	(Switzerland) Alain Menu	Williams Renault Dealer Racing	(United Kingdom) Colin Gallie
5	R10	Oulton Park (Fosters), Cheshire	26 May	(Switzerland) Alain Menu	(Switzerland) Alain Menu	(Switzerland) Alain Menu	Williams Renault Dealer Racing	(United Kingdom) Lee Brookes
6	R11	Donington Park (National), Leicestershire	15 June	(Switzerland) Alain Menu	(Switzerland) Alain Menu	(Germany) Frank Biela	Audi Sport UK	(United Kingdom) Lee Brookes
6	R12	Donington Park (National), Leicestershire	15 June	(Switzerland) Alain Menu	(Italy) Gabriele Tarquini	(Switzerland) Alain Menu	Williams Renault Dealer Racing	(United Kingdom) Lee Brookes
7	R13	Croft Circuit, North Yorkshire	29 June	(Switzerland) Alain Menu^{1}	(Italy) Gabriele Tarquini	(Switzerland) Alain Menu	Williams Renault Dealer Racing	(United Kingdom) Matt Neal
7	R14	Croft Circuit, North Yorkshire	29 June	(Switzerland) Alain Menu^{1}	(Switzerland) Alain Menu	(Switzerland) Alain Menu	Williams Renault Dealer Racing	(United Kingdom) Lee Brookes
8	R15	Knockhill Racing Circuit, Fife	3 August	(United Kingdom) John Bintcliffe	(Germany) Frank Biela	(United Kingdom) John Bintcliffe	Audi Sport UK	(United Kingdom) Robb Gravett
8	R16	Knockhill Racing Circuit, Fife	3 August	(Germany) Frank Biela	(Germany) Frank Biela	(Germany) Frank Biela	Audi Sport UK	(United Kingdom) Robb Gravett
9	R17	Snetterton Motor Racing Circuit, Norfolk	10 August	(Switzerland) Alain Menu	(Switzerland) Alain Menu	(Switzerland) Alain Menu	Williams Renault Dealer Racing	(United Kingdom) Lee Brookes
9	R18	Snetterton Motor Racing Circuit, Norfolk	10 August	(Switzerland) Alain Menu	(Switzerland) Alain Menu	(United Kingdom) Jason Plato	Williams Renault Dealer Racing	(United Kingdom) Matt Neal
10	R19	Thruxton Circuit, Hampshire	25 August	(Sweden) Rickard Rydell	(Italy) Gabriele Tarquini	(United Kingdom) John Bintcliffe	Audi Sport UK	(United Kingdom) Lee Brookes
10	R20	Thruxton Circuit, Hampshire	25 August	(United Kingdom) James Thompson	(Germany) Frank Biela	(Germany) Frank Biela	Audi Sport UK	(United Kingdom) Lee Brookes
11	R21	Brands Hatch (Indy), Kent	7 September	(Germany) Frank Biela^{2}	(United Kingdom) Anthony Reid	(Germany) Frank Biela	Audi Sport UK	(United Kingdom) Lee Brookes
11	R22	Brands Hatch (Indy), Kent	7 September	(United Kingdom) Anthony Reid^{3}	(Sweden) Rickard Rydell	(Sweden) Rickard Rydell	Volvo S40 Racing	(United Kingdom) Lee Brookes
12	R23	Silverstone Circuit (International), Northamptonshire	21 September	(United Kingdom) Jason Plato	(United Kingdom) Anthony Reid	(Switzerland) Alain Menu	Williams Renault Dealer Racing	(United Kingdom) Matt Neal
12	R24	Silverstone Circuit (International), Northamptonshire	21 September	(Switzerland) Alain Menu	(Switzerland) Alain Menu	(United Kingdom) Jason Plato	Williams Renault Dealer Racing	(United Kingdom) Matt Neal

^{1}Qualifying cancelled. Grids set by championship standings.
^{2}Qualifying cancelled. Grid set by fastest times in Sunday warm-up.
^{3}Qualifying cancelled. Grid set by fastest laps in race 1.

== Championships Standings ==
Points system											Ref
**1st**	**2nd**	**3rd**	**4th**	**5th**	**6th**	**7th**	**8th**	**9th**	**10th**	Pole position	Ref
15	12	10	8	6	5	4	3	2	1	1	

Note: bold signifies pole position (1 point awarded all races), italics signifies fastest lap.
Drivers top 20 results count towards the championship.

=== Drivers Championship ===
Pos.	Driver	DON		SIL		THR		BRH		OUL		DON		CRO		KNO		SNE		THR		BRH		SIL		Pts
1	(Switzerland) Alain Menu	1	1	1	**1**	**3**	**3**	**1**	(4)	**1**	**1**	**2**	**1**	**1**	**1**	3	Ret	**1**	**2**	17	2	3	(3)	1	**2**	281 (299)
2	(Germany) Frank Biela	Ret	3	7	Ret	1	Ret	9	6	3	Ret	1	3	4	17	2	**1**	3	9	2	1	**1**	5	8	15	**171**
3	(United Kingdom) Jason Plato	**2**	**Ret**	**10**	3	Ret	7	3	5	2	4	4	Ret	2	4	Ret	5	4	1	7	6	2	Ret	**3**	1	**170**
4	(Sweden) Rickard Rydell	Ret	2	2	2	5	5	7	16	6	3	5	7	3	9	4	7	5	5	**Ret**	7	15	1	18	7	**137**
5	(United Kingdom) James Thompson	Ret	6	Ret	9	6	Ret	2	1	Ret	2	6	11	5	2	6	Ret	2	4	3	**3**	Ret	Ret	7	4	**132**
6	(Italy) Gabriele Tarquini	7	4	5	15	2	1	6	**2**	Ret	Ret	Ret	6	Ret	Ret	7	3	Ret	3	4	4	Ret	7	4	3	**130**
7	(United Kingdom) John Bintcliffe	5	5	Ret	Ret	4	8	Ret	12	4	5	3	4	9	6	**1**	2	12	11	1	5	4	11	11	Ret	**119**
8	(United Kingdom) David Leslie	4	11	3	Ret	7	11	4	3	10	6	9	Ret	Ret	3	11	Ret	9	6	8	10	6	8	6	6	**87**
9	(United Kingdom) Tim Harvey	10	Ret	11	4	9	2	Ret	10	Ret	8	7	2	10	7	14	9	8	15	6	13	5	9	13	Ret	**66**
10	(United Kingdom) Kelvin Burt	3	9	4	Ret	Ret	13	8	8	9	Ret	8	Ret	12	12	8	4	Ret	8	Ret	16	14	6	5	8	**60**
11	(United Kingdom) Anthony Reid	Ret	Ret	Ret	Ret	8	4	5	14	7	Ret	11	Ret	Ret	8	5	Ret	Ret	10	13	Ret	Ret	**2**	2	Ret	**56**
12	(United Kingdom) John Cleland	11	Ret	6	6	14	9	11	9	5	12	12	8	6	5	10	6	7	16	19	11	13	12	12	11	**44**
13	(New Zealand) Paul Radisich	6	7	Ret	Ret	10	10	Ret	7	8	7	Ret	Ret	Ret	11	Ret	Ret	6	Ret	14	12	Ret	4	10	5	**41**
14	(United Kingdom) Derek Warwick	9	8	8	5	15	6	10	11	11	Ret	Ret	10	7	10	9	13	11	Ret	9	8	Ret	Ret	Ret	Ret	**33**
15	(United Kingdom) Will Hoy	Ret	DNS	12	7	11	12	DSQ	17	DNS	DNS	13	9	8	Ret	12	14	10	7	5	9	7	Ret	Ret	10	**27**
16	(United Kingdom) Patrick Watts	8	Ret	9	8	12	Ret	Ret	Ret	Ret	15	10	5	11	16	18	8	Ret	Ret	12	Ret	8	10	9	9	**26**
17	(United Kingdom) Lee Brookes	Ret	Ret	14	11	Ret	DNS	13	15	16	9	14	12	NC	13	17	15	13	Ret	10	14	9	13	15	16	**5**
18	(United Kingdom) Robb Gravett			13	10	16	16	12	13	14	13	17	Ret	15	14	13	10	14	13	16	Ret	10	14	16	14	**3**
19	(United Kingdom) Colin Gallie	12	10	15	12	17	15	DNS	DNS	12	10	15	15	16	15	15	11	15	14	15	17	11	15	17	13	**2**
20	(United Kingdom) Jamie Wall	13	Ret	16	13	18	17	14	Ret	13	11	18	14	14	Ret	16	12	Ret	DNS	18	15	12	17	19	17	**0**
21	(United Kingdom) Matt Neal	Ret	12	Ret	DNS	13	14	15	DNS	15	14	16	13	13	Ret	Ret	DNS	Ret	12	11	Ret	Ret	16	14	12	**0**
22	(Sweden) Jan Brunstedt			17	14																					**0**
23	(United Kingdom) Ian Heward											Ret	16					DNQ	DNQ	DNQ	DNQ			DNQ	DNQ	**0**
Pos.	Driver	DON		SIL		THR		BRH		OUL		DON		CRO		KNO		SNE		THR		BRH		SIL		Pts

Colour	Result
Gold	Winner
Silver	Second place
Bronze	Third place
Green	Points classification
Blue	Non-points classification
Blue	Non-classified finish (NC)
Purple	Retired, not classified (Ret)
Red	Did not qualify (DNQ)
Red	Did not pre-qualify (DNPQ)
Black	Disqualified (DSQ)
White	Did not start (DNS)
White	Withdrew (WD)
White	Race cancelled (C)
Blank	Did not practice (DNP)
Blank	Did not arrive (DNA)
Blank	Excluded (EX)

**Bold** – Pole
Italics – Fastest Lap

=== Privateers Championship ===
Pos.	Driver	DON		SIL		THR		BRH		OUL		DON		CRO		KNO		SNE		THR		BRH		SIL		Pts
1	(United Kingdom) Robb Gravett			13	10	16	16	12	13	14	13	17	Ret	15	14	13	10	14	13	16	Ret	10	14	16	14	236
2	(United Kingdom) Lee Brookes	Ret	Ret	14	11	Ret	DNS	13	15	16	9	14	12	NC	13	17	15	13	Ret	10	14	9	13	15	16	225
3	(United Kingdom) Colin Gallie	12	10	15	12	17	15	DNS	DNS	12	10	15	15	(16)	15	15	11	15	14	15	17	11	15	(17)	13	225 (241)
4	(United Kingdom) Jamie Wall	13	Ret	16	13	18	17	14	Ret	13	11	18	14	14	Ret	16	12	Ret	DNS	18	15	12	17	19	17	168
5	(United Kingdom) Matt Neal	Ret	12	Ret	DNS	13	14	15	DNS	15	14	16	13	13	Ret	Ret	DNS	Ret	12	11	Ret	Ret	16	14	12	166
6	(Sweden) Jan Brunstedt			17	14																					12
7	(United Kingdom) Ian Heward											Ret	16					DNQ	DNQ	DNQ	DNQ			DNQ	DNQ	6
Pos.	Driver	DON		SIL		THR		BRH		OUL		DON		CRO		KNO		SNE		THR		BRH		SIL		Pts

=== Manufacturers Championship ===
Pos	Manufacturer	DON		SIL		THR		BRH		OUL		DON		CRO		KNO		SNE		THR		BRH		SIL		Pts
1	Renault / Williams Renault Dealer Racing	1	1	1	1	3	3	1	(4)	1	1	2	1	1	1	3	(5)	1	1	(7)	2	2	(3)	1	1	278 (312)
2	Audi / Audi Sport UK	5	3	7	Ret	1	(8)	9	6	3	5	1	3	4	6	1	1	3	(9)	1	1	1	5	8	(15)	210 (222)
3	Honda / Team Honda Sport	7	4	5	(9)	2	1	2	1	(Ret)	2	6	6	5	2	6	3	2	3	3	3	Ret	(7)	4	3	209 (223)
4	Volvo / Volvo S40 Racing	3	2	2	2	5	5	7	(8)	6	3	5	7	3	(9)	4	4	5	5	Ret	7	(14)	1	5	7	191 (204)
5	Nissan / Vodafone Nissan Racing	4	11	3	Ret	7	4	4	3	7	6	9	(Ret)	(Ret)	3	5	Ret	9	6	8	10	6	2	2	6	155 (161)
6	Peugeot / Esso Ultron Team Peugeot	8	Ret	9	4	9	2	Ret	10	(Ret)	8	7	2	10	7	(14)	8	8	15	6	(13)	5	9	9	9	118 (127)
7	Ford / Team Mondeo	6	7	12	7	10	(10)	(Ret)	7	8	7	(13)	9	8	(11)	12	14	6	7	5	9	7	4	10	5	113 (125)
8	Vauxhall / Vauxhall Sport	9	8	6	5	14	6	10	9	5	(12)	12	8	6	5	9	6	7	(16)	9	8	13	(12)	(12)	11	106 (118)
Pos	Manufacturer	DON		SIL		THR		BRH		OUL		DON		CRO		KNO		SNE		THR		BRH		SIL		Pts

=== Teams Championship ===
Pos	Team	DON		SIL		THR		BRH		OUL		DON		CRO		KNO		SNE		THR		BRH		SIL		Pts
1	Williams Renault Dealer Racing	1	1	1	1	3	3	1	4	1	1	2	1	1	1	3	5	1	1	7	2	2	3	1	1	422
1	Williams Renault Dealer Racing	2	Ret	10	3	Ret	7	3	5	2	4	4	Ret	2	4	Ret	Ret	4	2	17	6	3	Ret	3	2	422
2	Audi Sport UK	5	3	7	Ret	1	8	9	6	3	5	1	3	4	6	1	1	3	9	1	1	1	5	8	15	283
2	Audi Sport UK	Ret	5	Ret	Ret	4	Ret	Ret	12	4	Ret	3	4	9	17	2	2	12	11	2	5	4	11	11	Ret	283
3	Team Honda Sport	7	4	5	9	2	1	2	1	Ret	2	6	6	5	2	6	3	2	3	3	3	Ret	7	4	3	254
3	Team Honda Sport	Ret	6	Ret	15	6	Ret	6	2	Ret	Ret	Ret	11	Ret	Ret	7	Ret	Ret	4	4	4	Ret	Ret	7	4	254
4	Volvo S40 Racing	3	2	2	2	5	5	7	8	6	3	5	7	3	9	4	4	5	5	Ret	7	14	1	5	7	191
4	Volvo S40 Racing	Ret	9	4	Ret	Ret	13	10	16	9	Ret	8	Ret	12	12	8	7	Ret	8	Ret	16	15	6	18	8	191
5	Vodafone Nissan Racing	4	11	3	Ret	7	4	4	3	7	6	9	Ret	Ret	3	5	Ret	9	6	8	10	6	2	2	6	142
5	Vodafone Nissan Racing	Ret	Ret	Ret	Ret	8	11	5	14	10	Ret	11	Ret	Ret	8	11	Ret	Ret	10	13	Ret	Ret	8	6	Ret	142
6	Esso Ultron Team Peugeot	8	Ret	9	4	9	2	Ret	10	Ret	8	7	2	10	7	14	8	8	15	6	13	5	9	9	9	92
6	Esso Ultron Team Peugeot	10	Ret	11	8	12	Ret	Ret	Ret	Ret	15	10	5	11	16	18	9	Ret	Ret	12	Ret	8	10	13	Ret	92
7	Vauxhall Sport	9	8	6	5	14	6	10	9	5	12	12	8	6	5	9	6	7	16	9	8	13	12	12	11	77
7	Vauxhall Sport	11	Ret	8	6	15	9	11	11	11	Ret	Ret	10	7	10	10	13	11	Ret	19	11	Ret	Ret	Ret	Ret	77
8	Team Mondeo	6	7	12	7	10	10	Ret	7	8	7	13	9	8	11	12	14	6	7	5	9	7	4	10	5	62
8	Team Mondeo	Ret	DNS	Ret	Ret	11	12	DSQ	17	DNS	DNS	Ret	Ret	Ret	Ret	Ret	Ret	10	Ret	14	12	Ret	Ret	Ret	10	62
9	Brookes Motorsport	Ret	Ret	14	11	Ret	DNS	13	15	16	9	14	12	NC	13	17	15	13	Ret	10	14	9	13	15	16	5
10	Rock-It Cargo			13	10	16	16	12	13	14	13	17	Ret	15	14	13	10	14	13	16	Ret	10	14	16	14	3
11	Team DCRS	12	10	15	12	17	15	DNS	DNS	12	10	15	15	16	15	15	11	15	14	15	17	11	15	17	13	2
12	Mint Motorsport	13	Ret	16	13	18	17	14	Ret	13	11	18	14	14	Ret	16	12	Ret	DNS	18	15	12	17	19	17	0
13	Team Dynamics	Ret	12	Ret	DNS	13	14	15	DNS	15	14	16	13	13	Ret	Ret	DNS	Ret	12	11	Ret	Ret	16	14	12	0
14	Janco Motorsport			17	14																					0
15	ProMotor Sport											Ret	16					DNQ	DNQ	DNQ	DNQ			DNQ	DNQ	0
Pos	Team	DON		SIL		THR		BRH		OUL		DON		CRO		KNO		SNE		THR		BRH		SIL		Pts

=== RAC Tourist Trophy Results ===
Pos.	Driver	DON		
Pos.	Driver	H1	H2	F
1	(Switzerland) Alain Menu	4	**1**	**1**
2	(United Kingdom) Jason Plato	2	14	2
3	(Sweden) Rickard Rydell	3	5	3
4	(Germany) Frank Biela	6	6	4
5	(France) Yvan Muller	9	4	5
6	(United Kingdom) Anthony Reid	**1**	17	6
7	(United Kingdom) Will Hoy	12	3	7
8	(Germany) Armin Hahne	15	13	8
9	(United Kingdom) John Bintcliffe	10	7	9
10	(Denmark) Kris Nissen	8	8	10
11	(United Kingdom) Matt Neal	Ret	10	11
12	(Germany) Christian Abt	13	9	12
13	(United Kingdom) Paula Cook	17	12	13
14	(United Kingdom) Jonny Kane	11	11	14
15	(United Kingdom) Tim Sugden	14	15	15
16	(Sweden) Kari Mäkinen	16	Ret	16
17	(Sweden) Jan Brunstedt	19	16	17
–	(United Kingdom) David Leslie	7	2	Ret
–	(United Kingdom) John Cleland	18	Ret	Ret
–	(New Zealand) Paul Radisich	5	Ret	Ret
–	(Norway) Tord Linnerud	Ret	Ret	DNS
–	(New Zealand) Aaron Slight	Ret	DNS	DNS
Pos.	Driver	H1	H2	F
Pos.	Driver	DON		

== Bibliography ==
- Fearnley, Paul (10 December 1997). Fearnley, Paul (ed.). Autocourse British Motorsport Year 1997-98. Oxford, UK: Hazleton Publishing. p. 176. ISBN 978-1-874557-67-8.
