= Colin Gallie =

British racing driver (born 1971)

- Nationality: (United Kingdom) British
- Born: 9 July 1971 (age 55) Falkirk, Stirlingshire, Scotland

British Touring Car Championship
- Years active: 1997
- Teams: Team DCRS
- Starts: 22
- Wins: 0
- Poles: 0
- Fastest laps: 0
- Best finish: 19th in 1997

Colin Gallie (born 9 July 1971 in Falkirk, Scotland) is a British auto racing driver. He is best known for his one-season driving in the British Touring Car Championship in 1997. He entered a 1994 BMW 320i for Team DCRS in the independents cup. He made an impressive start to the season, winning his class in the first two races. For most of the year, he was top of the table, but his ageing car struggled with reliability towards the end of the season. He finished third in the independents class behind overall winner Robb Gravett and Lee Brookes in second.

Gallie was set for a return to the BTCC in 1999, again running a BMW 320i but this time, under the TRM Motorsport banner. His entry featured on the official entry list but never appeared.

== Racing record ==
=== Complete British Touring Car Championship results ===
(key) (Races in bold indicate pole position - 1 point awarded all races) (Races in italics indicate fastest lap)

Year	Team	Car	1	2	3	4	5	6	7	8	9	10	11	12	13	14	15	16	17	18	19	20	21	22	23	24	Pos	Pts
1997	Team DCRS	BMW 318i	DON; 1; 12	DON; 2; 10	SIL; 1; 15	SIL; 2; 12	THR; 1; 17	THR; 2; 15	BRH; 1 DNS	BRH; 2 DNS	OUL; 1; 12	OUL; 2; 10	DON; 1; 15	DON; 2; 15	CRO; 1; 16	CRO; 2; 15	KNO; 1; 15	KNO; 2; 11	SNE; 1; 15	SNE; 2; 14	THR; 1; 15	THR; 2; 17	BRH; 1; 11	BRH; 2; 15	SIL; 1; 17	SIL; 2; 13	**19th**	**2**
