= Jamie Wall (racing driver) =

British racing driver (born 1977)

Jamie Wall (born 15 April 1977) is a British auto racing driver.

== Racing career ==
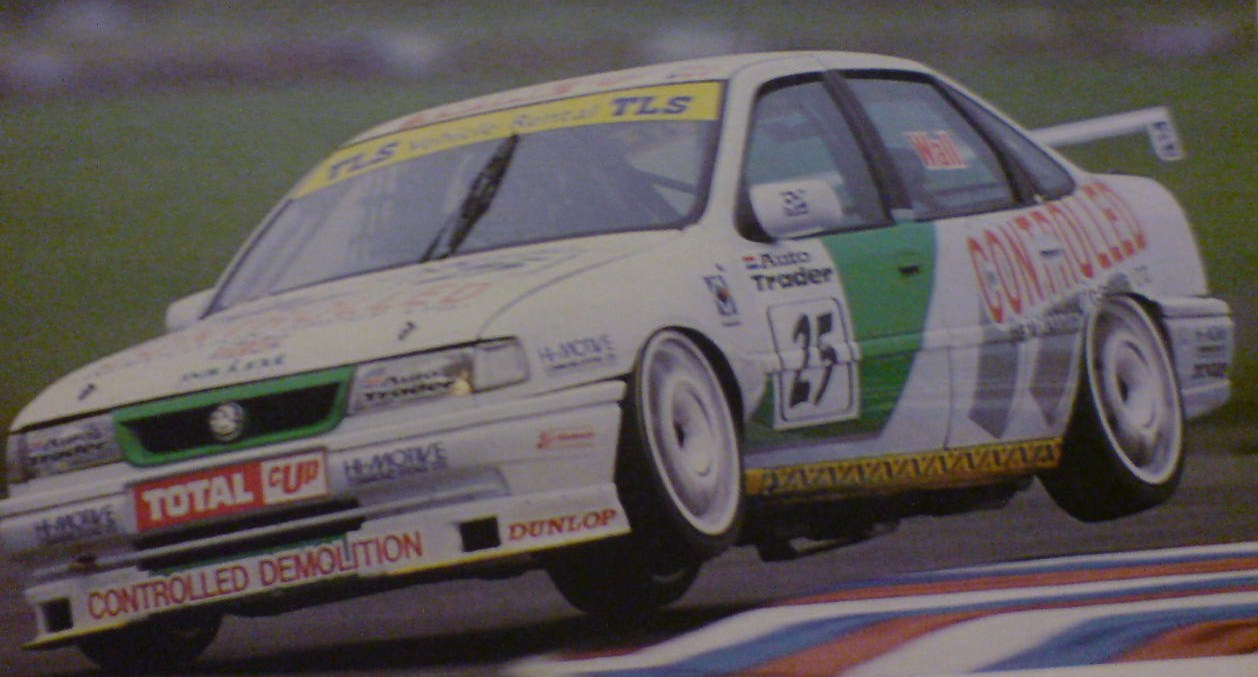
Jamie Wall driving a Vauxhall Cavalier in the 1997 British Touring Car Championship.

Wall was born in Chester, England. He started his racing career in karting in Britain. In 1995, he first raced saloon cars, in the Ford Credit Fiesta Championship. In 1996, he raced in both the Rover Coupe Turbo Cup and the Ford Fiesta Challenge.

In 1997, Wall competed in the British Touring Car Championship. He raced an ex-works Vauxhall Cavalier for the Mint Motorsport team.

Wall later spent two years driving in the Australian Super Touring Championship in an independent Honda Accord. In 2001, he drove in the Asia-Pacific Le Mans Series, in a Pilbeam-Nissan. This was followed by a drive in the 2003 Late Model US Stock Car Championship.

== Racing record ==
=== Complete British Touring Car Championship results ===
(key) (Races in bold indicate pole position - 1 point awarded all races) (Races in italics indicate fastest lap)

Year	Team	Car	1	2	3	4	5	6	7	8	9	10	11	12	13	14	15	16	17	18	19	20	21	22	23	24	DC	Pts
1997	Mint Motorsport	Vauxhall Cavalier	DON; 1; 13	DON; 2 Ret	SIL; 1; 16	SIL; 2; 13	THR; 1; 18	THR; 2; 17	BRH; 1; 14	BRH; 2 Ret	OUL; 1; 13	OUL; 2; 11	DON; 1; 18	DON; 2; 14	CRO; 1; 14	CRO; 2 Ret	KNO; 1; 16	KNO; 2; 12	SNE; 1 Ret	SNE; 2 DNS	THR; 1; 18	THR; 2; 15	BRH; 1; 12	BRH; 2; 17	SIL; 1; 19	SIL; 2; 17	**20th**	**0**

=== Complete Australian Super Touring Championship results ===
(key) (Races in bold indicate pole position - 1 point awarded) (Races in italics indicate fastest lap)

Year	Team	Car	1	2	3	4	5	6	7	8	9	10	11	12	13	14	15	16	17	18	19	20	21	DC	Pts
1999	Project Racing	Honda Accord	LAK; 1; 7	LAK; 2; 7	ORA; 1	ORA; 2	MAL; 1	MAL; 2	WIN; 1	WIN; 2	WIN; 3	ORA; 1	ORA; 2	ORA; 3	QLD; 1	QLD; 2	QLD; 3	ORA; 1	ORA; 2	ORA; 3	CAL; 1	CAL; 2	CAL; 3	**17th**	**8**
