= John Cleland (racing driver) =

British racing driver (born 1952)

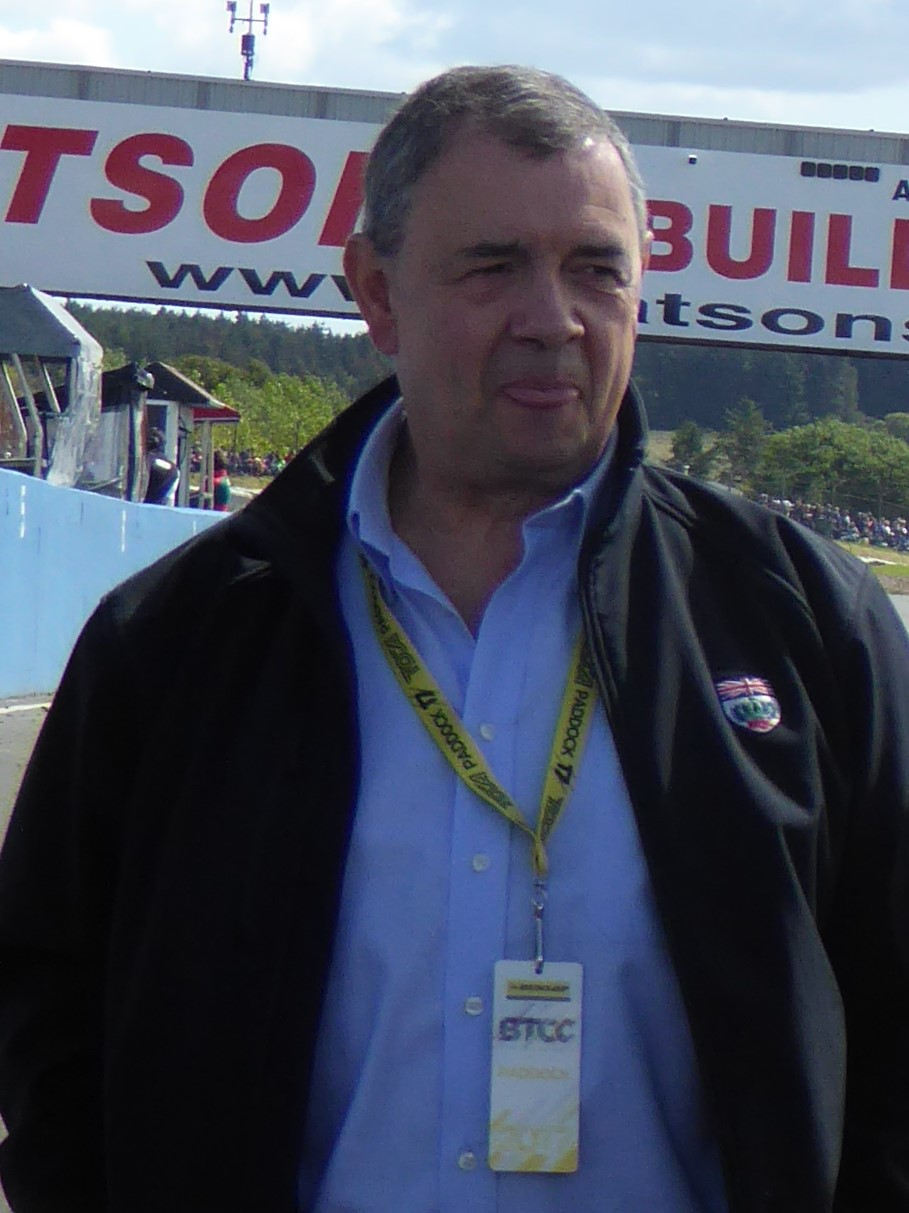
- Cleland in 2017
- Nationality: (United Kingdom) British
- Born: John Cunningham Cleland; 15 July 1952 (age 74) Wishaw, Scotland

Previous series
- 1989-1999: British Touring Car Championship

John Cunningham Cleland (born 15 July 1952) is a British retired auto racing driver, best known for winning the British Touring Car Championship in 1989 and 1995.

Born in Wishaw, Cleland raced autocross and hillclimb in the 1970s, and won his class in the Scottish Rally Championship in 1976 driving a Mitsubishi Colt. He switched to circuit racing, achieving success in British Production Car and Thundersaloon championships in the 1980s, before joining Vauxhall for the 1989 British Touring Car Championship. He was most recently a co-commentator alongside Martin Haven on the English world feed of the World Touring Car Championship.

== Racing career ==
=== Pre-BTCC ===
In the mid-1980s, Cleland's father Bill purchased the 1984 Bathurst 1000 second place Holden VK Commodore (an Australian car) from Peter Brock's Holden Dealer Team for his son to race in Thundersaloons. During this time, the Commodore ran as a Vauxhall Senator.

=== BTCC ===
Cleland adapted quickly to touring car racing and won the BTCC at his first attempt, in the days when the championship consisted of four separate classes, each in their own races but scoring points for the same title. Cleland won 11 of his 13 races in class C for 1601-2000cc cars. The 2-litre Cavalier was introduced the next year, in readiness for the single 2-litre format in 1991. Cleland finished second in class to his rival Frank Sytner in 1990 after a fierce season long battle, and fifth overall. The following year, he won three races and finished second in the championship to Will Hoy, taking Vauxhall's first ever overall BTCC win. In 1992, Cleland battled with Hoy and Tim Harvey for the title, but was denied at the last round by a controversial collision with Steve Soper, the teammate of eventual champion Harvey. In 1993 and 1994, the championship was dominated by BMW and Alfa Romeo respectively, and Cleland had to make do with fourth overall in both years.

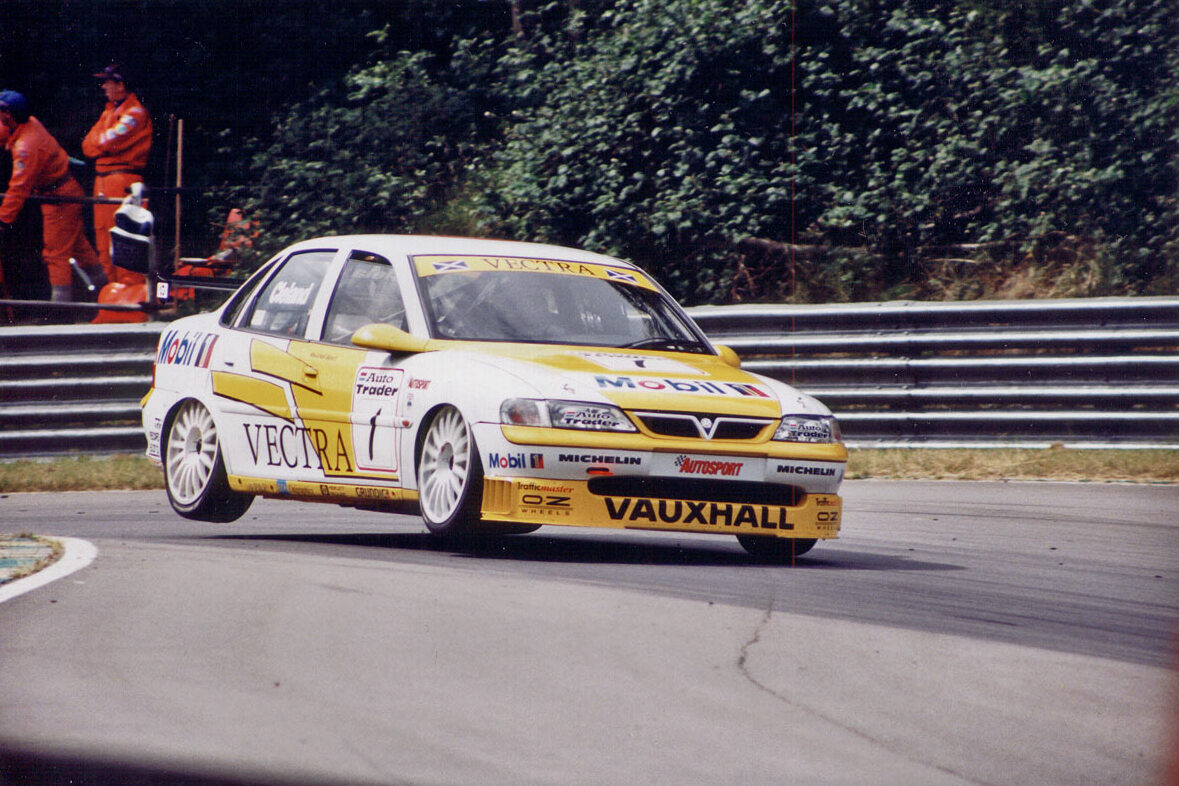
Cleland driving for Vauxhall in the 1996 British Touring Car Championship.

1995 proved to be the breakthrough year for the Cavalier, ironically in its last year of competition. Despite the Volvo 850 and Renault Laguna often having the edge in speed, in the hands of Rickard Rydell and Alain Menu respectively, Cleland's consistent run of points finishes allied to a four-race winning streak in the mid-season allowed him to beat both drivers to the title.

For 1996, the Cavalier was replaced by the new Vectra, which turned out to be a problematic package. Cleland finished eighth in the title chase. 1997 proved to be even worse, with Cleland slipping to 12th in the standings and Vauxhall finishing bottom of the Constructors' title. 1998 was better, and Cleland took two victories, both at Donington Park - a traditional happy hunting ground for the Scotsman - before a heavy crash at Snetterton interrupted his season. In 1999, Cleland was outpaced by team newcomer Yvan Muller and decided by mid-season to retire. He finished his last race at a wet Silverstone in tenth place, after being given a drive-through penalty for speeding in the pits, which provoked a typically belligerent reaction from Cleland over a live radio link to his car that had been set up by the BBC.

In a 2005 poll by Motorsport Magazine, Cleland was voted the tenth greatest touring car driver of all time.

=== Post BTCC ===
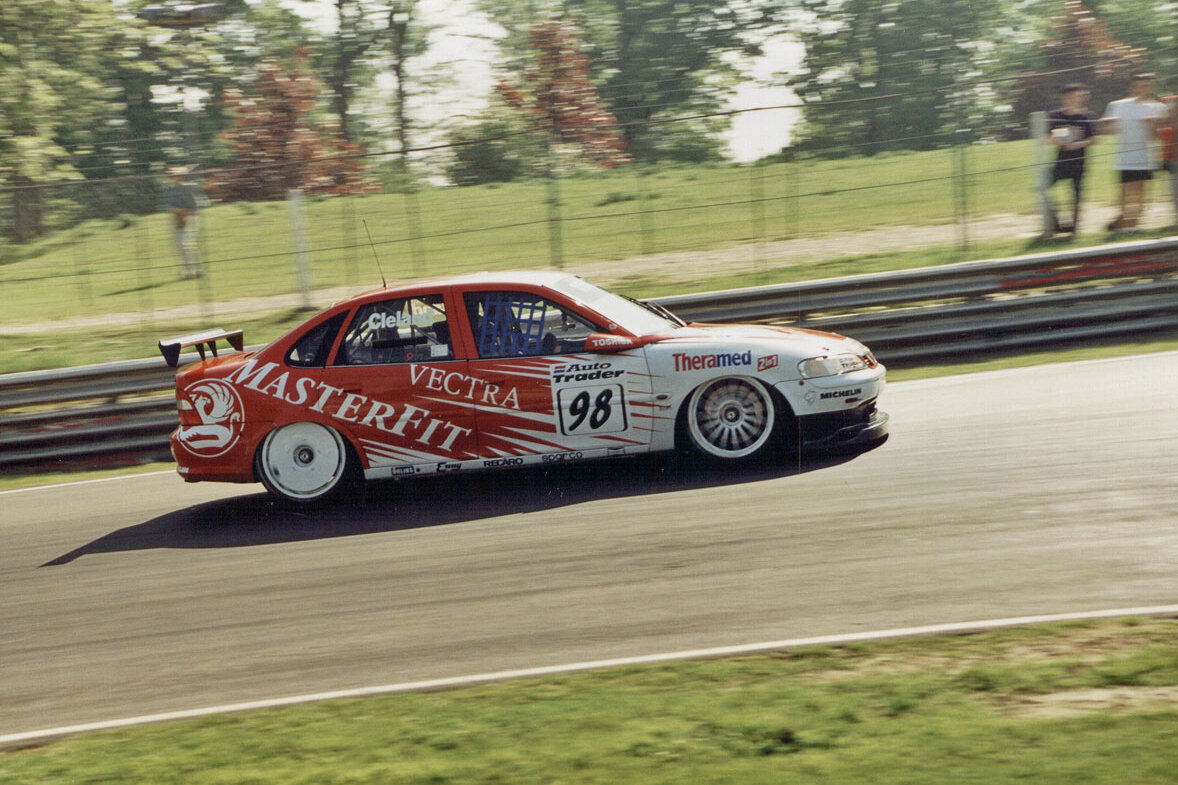
Cleland driving for Vauxhall in the 1998 British Touring Car Championship.

Aside running his long running car dealership, Cleland has done several guest drives since retiring from the BTCC, including a season in a Dodge Viper in the British GT Championship in 2000, co driving with Dave Clark for the CSi Brookspeed team. He later drove in an ASCAR race at Rockingham, twelve Bathurst 1000s between 1993 and 2005 for Advantage Racing, Pinnacle Motorsport, Gibson Motorsport, Triple Eight, Greenfield Mowers Racing and Brad Jones Racing with a best finish of second in the 2001 event, co driving with Brad Jones, and the BTCC Masters race in 2004. He now runs a Volvo dealership in Galashiels Scotland. His son Jamie has started a racing career. Cleland is also a co-commentator for Eurosport on their WTCC coverage. He replaced fellow Scot David Leslie after his death in 2008.

Cleland purchased his old Vauxhall Vectra super tourer, and now races in the Historic Super Touring championship, alongside his contemporaries Patrick Watts and Tim Harvey.

== Racing record ==
=== Complete European Touring Car Championship results ===
(key) (Races in bold indicate pole position) (Races in italics indicate fastest lap)

Year	Team	Car	1	2	3	4	5	6	7	8	9	10	11	12	13	14	DC	Pts
1980	(United Kingdom) **Dealer Opel Team**	Opel Monza 3.0E	MNZ	VAL	BRH	SAL	BRN	PER	NUR	SIL; 17	ZOL						NC	0
1981	(United Kingdom) **Dealer Opel Team**	Opel Monza 3.0E	MNZ	VAL	DON	SAL	BRN	PER	SIL; Ret	ZOL							NC	0
1982	(United Kingdom) **Monorep Ltd. Vauxhall Opel Dealers**	Opel Monza 3.0E	MNZ	VAL	DON	PER	MUG	BRN	SAL	NUR	SPA	SIL; 24	ZOL				NC	0
1983	(United Kingdom) **GM Dealer Sport**	Opel Monza 3.0E	MNZ	VAL	DON	PER	MUG	BRN	ZEL	NUR	SAL	SPA	SIL; 13	ZOL			NC	0
1986	(United Kingdom) **GM Dealer Sport**	Holden VK Commodore SS Group A	MNZ	DON	HOC	MIS	AND	BRN	ZEL	NÜR	SPA	SIL; Ret	NOG	ZOL	JAR	EST	NC	0

=== Complete British Touring Car Championship results ===
(key) Races in bold indicate pole position (1 point awarded all races 1996 onwards, 1989–1990 in class) Races in italics indicate fastest lap (1 point awarded all races - 1989–1990 in class) * signifies that driver lead feature race for at least one lap (1 point awarded - 1998 onwards)

Year	Team	Car	Class	1	2	3	4	5	6	7	8	9	10	11	12	13	14	15	16	17	18	19	20	21	22	23	24	25	26	Overall pos	Pts	Class pos
1989	Vauxhall Motorsport	Vauxhall Astra GTE 16v	C	**OUL** ovr:15 cls:1	SIL ovr:19 cls:1	**THR** ovr:19 cls:3	**DON** ovr:9 cls:1	**THR** ovr:15 cls:1	**SIL**; Ret	**SIL** ovr:21 cls:1	**BRH** ovr:14 cls:1	**SNE** ovr:16 cls:1	**BRH** ovr:14 cls:1	**BIR** ovr:16 cls:1	**DON** ovr:17 cls:1	**SIL** ovr:20 cls:1														1st	110	**1st**
1990	Vauxhall Motorsport	Vauxhall Cavalier	B	OUL ovr:7 cls:3	DON; Ret	**THR** ovr:7 cls:1	**SIL** ovr:7 cls:2	**OUL**; Ret	**SIL** ovr:9 cls:2	**BRH**; Ret	**SNE** ovr:6 cls:1	**BRH** ovr:7 cls:1	**BIR**; Ret	**DON** ovr:12 cls:6	**THR**; Ret	**SIL** ovr:7 cls:1														5th	128	**2nd**
1991	Vauxhall Sport	Vauxhall Cavalier		SIL; 3	**SNE**; 9	DON; 2	THR; 1	SIL; 1^{1}	BRH; 12	SIL; 6	**DON**; **1**; 3	DON; 2; 10	**OUL**; 1	BRH; 1; 4	BRH; 2; 3	**DON**; 1	THR; 8	SIL; 9												2nd	132	
1992	Vauxhall Sport	Vauxhall Cavalier		**SIL**; 1	**THR**; 1	OUL; 11	SNE; 2	BRH; 1	DON; 1; 2	DON; 2; 4	**SIL**; 3	KNO; 1 DSQ	KNO; 2; 3	PEM; Ret	BRH; 1; 4	BRH; 2; 3	DON; 3	SIL; Ret												3rd	145	
1993	Vauxhall Sport	Vauxhall Cavalier		SIL; 3	DON; 4	SNE; 10	DON; 7	**OUL**; 2	BRH; 1 Ret	BRH; 2; 5	PEM; 7	SIL; 6	KNO; 1; 1	**KNO**; **2**; 2	OUL; 3	BRH; 12	THR; 8	DON; 1 Ret	DON; 2; 6	SIL; 7										4th	102	
1994	Vauxhall Sport	Vauxhall Cavalier 16v		THR; 2	BRH; 1; 3	BRH; 2; 2	SNE; Ret	SIL; 1; 7	SIL; 2; 4	OUL; 7	DON; 1; 1	**DON**; **2**; 1	BRH; 1; 5	BRH; 2; 4	SIL; DNS	KNO; 1; 5	KNO; 2; 6	OUL; Ret	BRH; 1 Ret	BRH; 2 DNS	SIL; 1; 4	SIL; 2; 4	DON; 1; 8	DON; 2; 5						4th	177	
1995	Vauxhall Sport	Vauxhall Cavalier 16v		DON; 1; 1	DON; 2; 2	BRH; 1 Ret	BRH; 2 Ret	THR; 1; 2	THR; 2; 5	SIL; 1; 3	SIL; 2; 5	OUL; 1; 2	OUL; 2; 3	BRH; 1; 2	BRH; 2; 1	**DON**; **1**; 1	**DON**; **2**; 1	**SIL**; 1	KNO; 1; 5	KNO; 2; 6	BRH; 1; 3	BRH; 2; 1	SNE; 1; 13	SNE; 2; 3	OUL; 1; 3	OUL; 2; 2	**SIL**; **1**; 3	SIL; 2; 3		1st	348	
1996	Vauxhall Sport	Vauxhall Vectra		DON; 1; 5	DON; 2; 6	BRH; 1; 7	BRH; 2 Ret	THR; 1; 4	THR; 2; 4	SIL; 1; 10	SIL; 2 Ret	OUL; 1 Ret	OUL; 2; 9	SNE; 1; 3	SNE; 2; 2	BRH; 1; 10	BRH; 2; 4	SIL; 1; 10	SIL; 2 Ret	KNO; 1 Ret	KNO; 2; 6	OUL; 1; 7	OUL; 2; 7	THR; 1; 5	THR; 2; 7	DON; 1; 6	DON; 2; 8	BRH; 1; 6	BRH; 2 Ret	8th	97	
1997	Vauxhall Sport	Vauxhall Vectra		DON; 1; 11	DON; 2 Ret	SIL; 1; 6	SIL; 2; 6	THR; 1; 14	THR; 2; 9	BRH; 1; 11	BRH; 2; 9	OUL; 1; 5	OUL; 2; 12	DON; 1; 12	DON; 2; 8	CRO; 1; 6	CRO; 2; 5	KNO; 1; 10	KNO; 2; 6	SNE; 1; 7	SNE; 2; 16	THR; 1; 19	THR; 2; 11	BRH; 1; 13	BRH; 2; 12	SIL; 1; 12	SIL; 2; 11			12th	44	
1998	Vauxhall Sport	Vauxhall Vectra		THR; 1; 4	THR; 2; 6	SIL; 1; 6	SIL; 2; 7	DON; 1; 1	DON; 2; 3*	BRH; 1; 6	BRH; 2; 9*	OUL; 1; 7	OUL; 2; 6*	DON; 1; 5	DON; 2; 1*	CRO; 1; 6	CRO; 2; 8	SNE; 1; 9	SNE; 2 Ret	THR; 1	THR; 2	KNO; 1; 13	KNO; 2 Ret	BRH; 1; 8	BRH; 2 Ret	OUL; 1; 9	OUL; 2; 11	SIL; 1; 8	SIL; 2 Ret	8th	106	
1999	Vauxhall Motorsport	Vauxhall Vectra		DON; 1; 8	DON; 2; 4*	SIL; 1; 10	SIL; 2; 8	THR; 1; 7	THR; 2; 9	BRH; 1; 8	BRH; 2; 9	OUL; 1; 12	OUL; 2 Ret	DON; 1; 6	DON; 2 Ret	CRO; 1; 9	CRO; 2 Ret	SNE; 1; 12	SNE; 2; 12	THR; 1; 12	THR; 2 Ret	KNO; 1; 8	KNO; 2; 9	BRH; 1; 11	BRH; 2; 9	OUL; 1; 8	OUL; 2 Ret	SIL; 1; 5	SIL; 2; 10	13th	51	

1. – Race was stopped due to heavy rain. No points were awarded.

=== Complete V8 Supercar Championship results ===
Supercars results
Year	Team	Car	1	2	3	4	5	6	7	8	9	10	11	12	13	14	15	16	17	18	19	20	21	22	23	24	25	26	27	28	29	30	31	32	33	Position	Points
1999	Greenfield Mowers Racing	Ford Falcon EL	EAS; R1	EAS; R2	EAS; R3	ADE; R4	BAR; R5	BAR; R6	BAR; R7	PHI; R8	PHI; R9	PHI; R10	HID; R11	HID; R12	HID; R13	SAN; R14	SAN; R15	SAN; R16	QLD; R17	QLD; R18	QLD; R19	CAL; R20	CAL; R21	CAL; R22	SYM; R23	SYM; R24	SYM; R25	WIN; R26	WIN; R27	WIN; R28	ORA; R29	ORA; R30	ORA; R31	QLD; R32	BAT; R33; Ret	NC	0
2000	Gibson Motorsport	Holden Commodore VT	PHI; R1	PHI; R2	BAR; R3	BAR; R4	BAR; R5	ADE; R6	ADE; R7	EAS; R8	EAS; R9	EAS; R10	HID; R11	HID; R12	HID; R13	CAN; R14	CAN; R15	CAN; R16	QLD; R17	QLD; R18	QLD; R19	WIN; R20	WIN; R21	WIN; R22	ORA; R23	ORA; R24	ORA; R25	CAL; R26	CAL; R27	CAL; R28	QLD; R29; 14	SAN; R30	SAN; R31	SAN; R32	BAT; R33; Ret	51st	48
2001	Brad Jones Racing	Ford Falcon AU	PHI; R1	PHI; R2	ADE; R3	ADE; R4	EAS; R5	EAS; R6	HID; R7	HID; R8	HID; R9	CAN; R10	CAN; R11	CAN; R12	BAR; R13	BAR; R14	BAR; R15	CAL; R16	CAL; R17	CAL; R18	ORA; R19	ORA; R20	QLD; R21; Ret	WIN; R22	WIN; R23	BAT; R24; 2	PUK; R25	PUK; R26	PUK; R27	SAN; R28	SAN; R29	SAN; R30				37th	520
2002	Brad Jones Racing	Ford Falcon AU	ADE; R1	ADE; R2	PHI; R3	PHI; R4	EAS; R5	EAS; R6	EAS; R7	HDV; R8	HDV; R9	HDV; R10	CAN; R11	CAN; R12	CAN; R13	BAR; R14	BAR; R15	BAR; R16	ORA; R17	ORA; R18	WIN; R19	WIN; R20	QLD; R21; 17	BAT; R22; 19	SUR; R23	SUR; R24	PUK; R25	PUK; R26	PUK; R27	SAN; R28	SAN; R29					51st	60
2003	Brad Jones Racing	Ford Falcon BA	ADE; R1	ADE; R1	PHI; R3	EAS; R4	WIN; R5	BAR; R6	BAR; R7	BAR; R8	HDV; R9	HDV; R10	HDV; R11	QLD; R12	ORA; R13	SAN; R14; 20	BAT; R15; 9	SUR; R16	SUR; R17	PUK; R18	PUK; R19	PUK; R20	EAS; R21	EAS; R22												41st	160
2004	Brad Jones Racing	Ford Falcon BA	ADE; R1	ADE; R2	EAS; R3	PUK; R4	PUK; R5	PUK; R6	HDV; R7	HDV; R8	HDV; R9	BAR; R10	BAR; R11	BAR; R12	QLD; R13	WIN; R14	ORA; R15	ORA; R16	SAN; R17; Ret	BAT; R18; Ret	SUR; R19	SUR; R20	SYM; R21	SYM; R22	SYM; R23	EAS; R24	EAS; R25	EAS; R26								NC	0
2005	Brad Jones Racing	Ford Falcon BA	ADE; R1	ADE; R2	PUK; R3	PUK; R4	PUK; R5	BAR; R6	BAR; R7	BAR; R8	EAS; R9	EAS; R10	SHA; R11	SHA; R12	SHA; R13	HDV; R14	HDV; R15	HDV; R16	QLD; R17	ORA; R18	ORA; R19	SAN; R20; 21	BAT; R21; 7	SUR; R22	SUR; R23	SUR; R24	SYM; R25	SYM; R26	SYM; R27	PHI; R28	PHI; R29	PHI; R30				42nd	168

=== Complete Bathurst 1000 results ===
Year	Team	Co-driver	Car	Class	Laps	Pos.	Class pos.
1993	(Australia) Mobil 1 Racing	(Australia) Peter Brock	Holden Commodore VP	A	142	17th	17th
1995	(Australia) Pinnacle Motorsport	(Australia) Tony Scott	Holden Commodore VR		158	6th	6th
1996	(Australia) Gibson Motorsport	(Australia) Mark Skaife	Holden Commodore VR		159	7th	7th
1997*	(United Kingdom) Vauxhall Sport	(United Kingdom) James Kaye	Vauxhall Vectra		32	DNF	DNF
1998*	(United Kingdom) Vauxhall Sport	(United Kingdom) Derek Warwick	Vauxhall Vectra	ST	157	5th	5th
1999	(Australia) Greenfield Mowers Racing	(Australia) Cameron McLean	Ford Falcon EL		138	DNF	DNF
2000	(Australia) Gibson Motorsport	(Australia) Rodney Forbes	Holden Commodore VT		78	DNF	DNF
2001	(Australia) OzEmail Racing Team	(Australia) Brad Jones	Ford Falcon AU		161	2nd	2nd
2002	(Australia) OzEmail Racing Team	(Australia) Tim Leahey	Ford Falcon AU		157	19th	19th
2003	(Australia) OzEmail Racing Team	(Australia) Andrew Jones	Ford Falcon BA		160	9th	9th
2004	(Australia) OzEmail Racing Team	(Australia) Andrew Jones	Ford Falcon BA		29	DNF	DNF
2005	(Australia) Team BOC	(Australia) Dale Brede	Ford Falcon BA		159	7th	7th

* Super Touring race

=== Complete British GT Championship results ===
(key) (Races in bold indicate pole position) (Races in italics indicate fastest lap)

Year	Team	Car	Class	1	2	3	4	5	6	7	8	9	10	11	12	Pos	Points
2000	CSi Brookspeed Racing	Chrysler Viper GTS-R	GT	THR; 1	CRO; 1	OUL; 1 Ret	DON; 1; 4	SIL; 1; 3	BRH; 1 WD	DON; 1; 3	CRO; 1 WD	SIL; 1	SNE; 1	SPA; 1	SIL; 1	21st	28
2000	Cirtek Motorsport	Porsche 996 GT3-R	GTO	THR; 1; 5	CRO; 1 WD	OUL; 1	DON; 1	SIL; 1	BRH; 1	DON; 1	CRO; 1	SIL; 1	SNE; 1	SPA; 1	SIL; 1	25th	12

Awards and achievements
Preceded by Gabriele Tarquini	Autosport; National Racing Driver of the Year; 1995	Succeeded by Frank Biela
Sporting positions
Preceded by Frank Sytner	British Touring Car Champion; 1989	Succeeded by Robb Gravett
Preceded by Gabriele Tarquini	British Touring Car Champion; 1995	Succeeded by Frank Biela
