= Apex Motorsport =

Racing team

(United Kingdom) Apex Motorsport
- Founded: 1996
- Founder(s): Richard Lloyd
- Folded: 2014
- Base: Buckingham, Buckinghamshire, United Kingdom
- Team principal(s): John Wickham; Harry Handkammer
- Former series: British Touring Car Championship; FIA GT3 European Championship; British GT Championship; International GT Open
- Noted drivers: (Germany) Frank Biela (United Kingdom) John Bintcliffe (France) Yvan Muller (United Kingdom) Guy Smith (Monaco) Stéphane Ortelli (United Kingdom) Andy Wallace (United States) Butch Leitzinger (Belgium) Eric van de Poele
- Teams' Championships: 1 (1996 BTCC)
- Drivers' Championships: 1 (1996 BTCC)

Apex Motorsport, formerly known as Audi Sport UK, was a British auto racing team founded in 1996 by former racing driver Richard Lloyd in partnership with the Volkswagen Group. Formed to bring Audi into the British Touring Car Championship, the team won the teams and manufacturers titles in their debut season, as well as the drivers championship for German Frank Biela with eight victories over the course of the season. Biela and Audi Sport UK finished the 1997 season in second for all three championships before the series banned the four-wheel drive systems that Audi utilized, forcing the team to redevelop a new car for 1998. The 1998 BTCC campaign was winless, and Audi Sport UK left the series at the end of the season to concentrate on sports car racing.

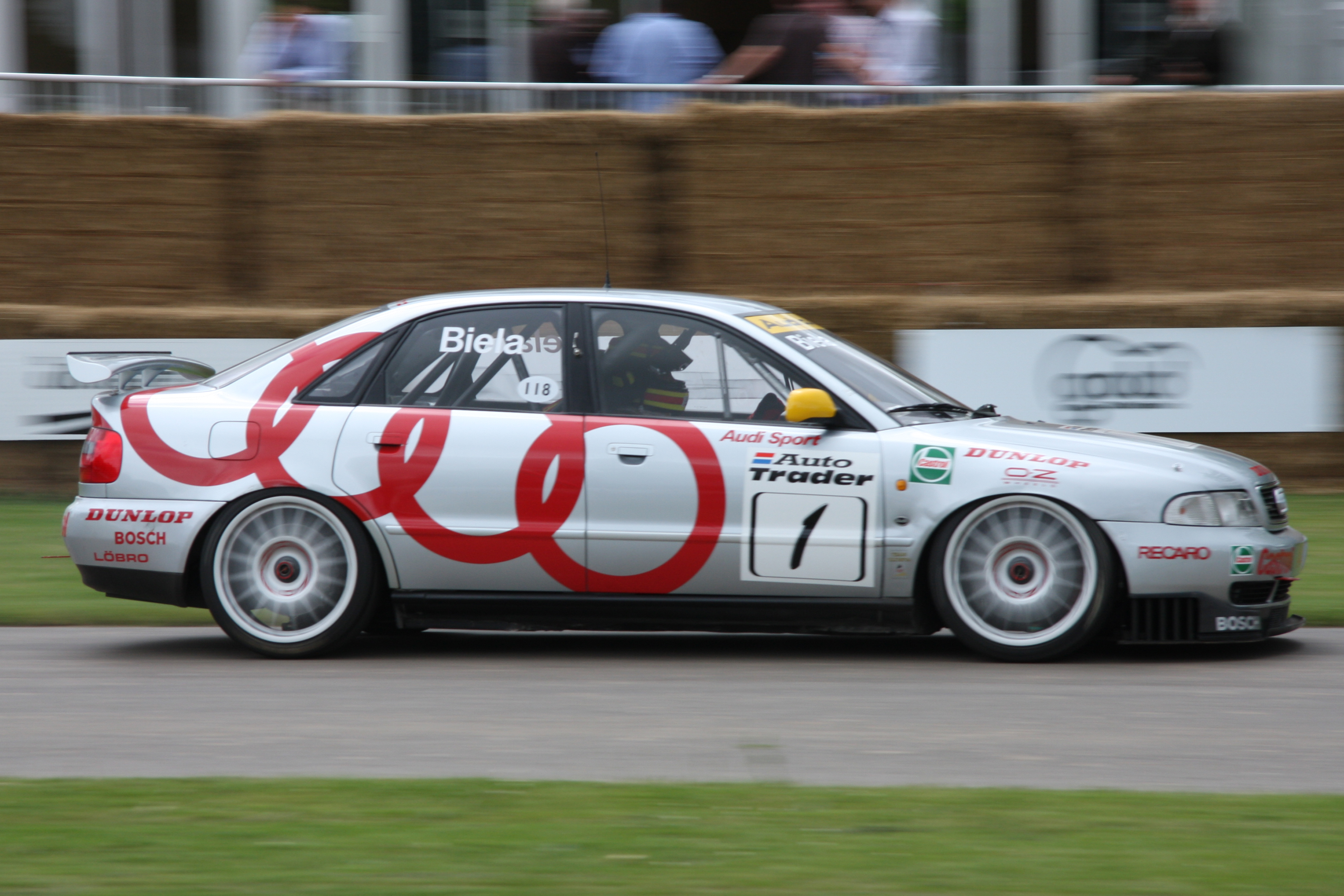
Frank Biela's 1996 British Touring Car Championship Audi A4

Audi Sport UK, in conjunction with Racing Technology Norfolk, developed and campaigned the Audi R8C for Audi's first attempt at the 24 Hours of Le Mans. The team failed to finish, in part due to a rushed schedule to complete the two cars. The team spent 2000 building cars for the American Speedvision World Challenge series but remained involved in Volkswagen's sports car program as Bentley, another Volkswagen Group brand, began developing their own entry for Le Mans. The team changed their name to Apex Motorsport and debuted the Bentley EXP Speed 8 in 2001 and finished with one car on the race podium. A fourth-place finish followed in 2002 before Apex joined with Joest Racing, who had been running Audi's continued Le Mans program, to campaign two cars in 2003 at the 12 Hours of Sebring as well as Le Mans. Third and fourth places were earned at Sebring, while Team Bentley scored a one-two finish at Le Mans, with Tom Kristensen, Rinaldo Capello, and Guy Smith driving the winning car.

Bentley's program ended after the Le Mans victory, and Apex Motorsport was left without any Volkswagen Group programs and remained stagnant for two years. The team's assets were put up for auction in 2006 to no avail. Lloyd, along with racing driver and entrepreneur Harry Handkammer, approached Jaguar Cars to develop a Group GT3 sportscar program. Built around the Jaguar XKR, Apex and Jaguar agreed to build cars for the team as well as cars to be sold to customers to justify the cost of the program. The team first raced the cars late in the 2007 season for the international FIA GT3 European Championship and British GT Championship. While developing the Jaguars in March 2008, Lloyd and team member Christopher Allarton, along with racing driver David Leslie were en route to Nogaro Circuit for testing when their aircraft crashed near Biggin Hill. All three, plus two pilots, were killed in the crash. Despite the loss for the team, they continued their FIA GT3 campaign for the season, and pushed with further development of the car in 2009. However the project came to an early close in 2009 after no cars had been sold to customers and the team was dissolved by 2014.

== Racing record ==
=== 24 Hours of Le Mans ===
Year	Entrant	No.	Car	Drivers	Class	Laps	Pos.	Class Pos.
1999	(United Kingdom) Audi Sport UK	9	Audi R8C	(Germany) Christian Abt (Sweden) Stefan Johansson (Monaco) Stéphane Ortelli	LMGTP	55	DNF	DNF
1999	(United Kingdom) Audi Sport UK	10	Audi R8C	(United Kingdom) Perry McCarthy (United Kingdom) Andy Wallace (United Kingdom) James Weaver	LMGTP	198	DNF	DNF
2001	(United Kingdom) Team Bentley	7	Bentley EXP Speed 8	(United Kingdom) Martin Brundle (Monaco) Stéphane Ortelli (United Kingdom) Guy Smith	LMGTP	56	DNF	DNF
2001	(United Kingdom) Team Bentley	8	Bentley EXP Speed 8	(United States) Butch Leitzinger (Belgium) Eric van de Poele (United Kingdom) Andy Wallace	LMGTP	306	3rd	1st
2002	(United Kingdom) Team Bentley	8	Bentley EXP Speed 8	(United States) Butch Leitzinger (Belgium) Eric van de Poele (United Kingdom) Andy Wallace	LMGTP	362	4th	1st
2003	(United Kingdom) Team Bentley	7	Bentley Speed 8	(Italy) Rinaldo Capello (Denmark) Tom Kristensen (United Kingdom) Guy Smith	LMGTP	377	1st	1st
2003	(United Kingdom) Team Bentley	8	Bentley Speed 8	(United Kingdom) Mark Blundell (Australia) David Brabham (United Kingdom) Johnny Herbert	LMGTP	375	2nd	2nd
