= 2001 24 Hours of Le Mans =

69th 24 Hours of Le Mans endurance race

Previous: 2000	Next: 2002
Index: Races | Winners

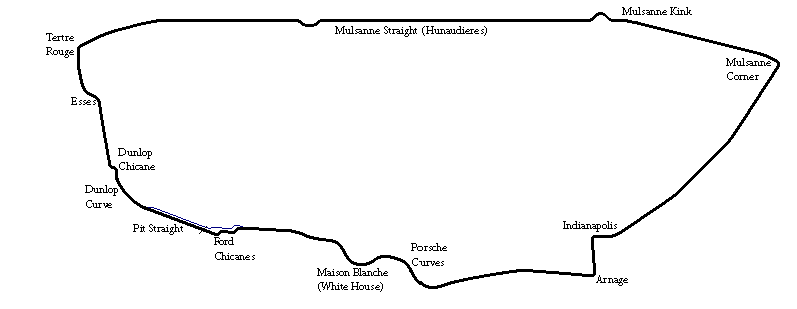
Le Mans in 2001

The 2001 24 Hours of Le Mans was the 69th Grand Prix of Endurance, and took place on 16 and 17 June 2001.

== Background ==
=== Preview ===
The 2001 24 Hours of Le Mans was the 69th edition of the race and took place at the 8.454 mi (13.605 km) Circuit de la Sarthe road racing circuit close by Le Mans, France from 16 to 17 June. The race was first held in 1923 after the automotive journalist Charles Faroux, the Automobile Club de l'Ouest (ACO) general secretary Georges Durand and the industrialist Emile Coquile agreed to hold a test of vehicle reliability and durability. It is considered the world's most prestigious sports car race and is part of the Triple Crown of Motorsport.

=== Track and regulation changes ===
After the 2000 race, the ACO and the French government modified the Route nationale 138 which forms the Mulsanne Straight, by decreasing the height of a hill by 7.9 ft (2.4 m) on the approach to the Mulsanne Corner where Mark Webber had an airborne accident in a Mercedes-Benz CLR during a warm-up session for the 1999 edition. Work in the area costing almost F6.5 million was mandated by motor racing's governing body, the Fédération Internationale de l'Automobile (FIA), to comply with road safety regulations and traffic using the area was diverted onto an alternate route. It commenced on 1 December 2000 with the removal of 7,000 m^{3} (250,000 cu ft) of cuttings and continued until mid-March 2001. Other changes included a widening of the run-off area to the outside on the approach to the right-hand Indianapolis corner and a gravel trap and spectator section was moved further back in an attempt to enhance safety.

The ACO allowed cars in the Le Mans Prototype 675 (LMP675) category to be installed with a V6 turbocharged engine with a maximum capacity of 2,000 cc (120 cu in) up from a V4 power unit in the 2000 event. Teams could also fit a V8 engine into a car in the event that it was normally aspirated. The governing body also revoked a regulation for a car's headlights to be switched on in daylight hours and the FIA would supervise laboratory crash tests conducted on all vehicles. Changes to the format of the weekend saw the test day have 48 cars and 6 reserves all driving together in lieu of individual sessions for Grand Touring and Prototypes and would not eliminate any cars from contention as seen in previous editions of the race.

== Entries ==
The ACO received 80 "good quality" inquires for applications by the deadline for entries at midnight, 28 February 2001. The ACO's eight-person selection committee granted 48 invitations to the 24 Hours of Le Mans in-late March. Entries were divided between the Le Mans Prototype 900 (LMP900), Le Mans Grand Touring Prototype (LMGTP), LMP675, Le Mans Grand Touring Sport (LMGTS) and Le Mans Grand Touring (LMGT) categories.

=== Automatic entries ===
Automatic entries were earned by teams which won their class in the 2000 24 Hours of Le Mans, or have won Le Mans-based series and events such as the 2000 Petit Le Mans of the American Le Mans Series, the Race of a Thousand Years held as part of the Asian-Pacific Le Mans Series and the 2000 1000 km of Nürburgring of the European Le Mans Series. As entries were pre-selected to teams, they were restricted to a maximum of two cars and were not allowed to change their vehicles nor their competitors' licence from the previous year to the next. Entries were permitted to change category provided that they did not change the make of vehicle and the ACO granted official permission for the switch.

The ACO published its final list of automatic berths on 26 January 2001. Audi Sport North America, Viper Team Oreca and Dick Barbour Racing were the three teams out of the twelve that were pre-selected to decline their automatic invitations.

Reason Entered	LMP	LMGTS	LMGT
1st in the 24 Hours of Le Mans	(Germany) Audi Sport Team Joest	(France) Viper Team Oreca	(Japan) Team Taisan Advan
1st in the 1000 km of Nürburgring	(United States) Panoz Motor Sports	(France) Viper Team Oreca	(United States) Dick Barbour Racing^{1}
1st in the Petit Le Mans	(Germany) Audi Sport North America	(United States) Corvette Racing Pratt	(United States) Dick Barbour Racing^{1}
1st in the Race of a Thousand Years	(Germany) Audi Sport North America^{1}	(France) Viper Team Oreca^{1}	(United States) Dick Barbour Racing^{1}

1. – Team declined their automatic invitations.

=== Entry list and reserves ===
The ACO announced the full 48-car entry list for Le Mans plus six reserves on 4 April. The Ascari, Audi, Bentley, Cadillac, Courage, Chrysler, Dome and Panoz brands were accepted into the two Prototype classes, which featured a mixture of works teams and privateers. Cars from Lola, Pilbeam and Reynard featured in the eight-vehicle LMP675 class. Chrysler, General Motors via its Chevrolet division and Saleen were the three manufacturers in the LMGTS category. The majority of cars in the LMGT class were from Porsche with Callaway represented by one team. On 27 April, the No. 59 Saleen/Allen Speedlab-entered S7 was withdrawn from the race. The No. 21 Team Ascari car was promoted from the top of the list of reserves to take the vacated slot on the grid.

== Testing ==
A mandatory pre-Le Mans test day split into two daytime sessions of four hours each was held at the circuit on 6 May, involving all 48 cars and four reserve entries. The morning session was led by Audi with a lap of 3:36.054 from Stefan Johansson in the No. 4 Johansson Motorsport R8. The top-placed works Audi was Tom Kristensen's No. 1 Team Joest car in second and the fastest Bentley EXP Speed 8 was the No. 7 of Stéphane Ortelli in third. Emanuele Pirro of Team Joest, Johnny Herbert for Champion Racing and Yannick Dalmas in a Chrysler LMP occupied fourth to sixth positions. A broken exhaust header caused the carbon fibre chassis on David Brabham's Panoz LMP07 to catch fire in the final moments of the morning session. Panoz withdrew the No. 12 car for the rest of the test day due to extensive damage it sustained. Eric van de Poele for Dick Barbour set the fastest lap in the LMP675 category, while the Larbre Compétition team led both GT classes with the No. 58 Oreca Viper and the No. 60 Porsche. Several drivers ran off the circuit during the session. Kristensen damaged the No. 2 Audi's front-right and the car's suspension arm was replaced. The No. 64 Corvette's steering failed and the car was stopped on the Mulsanne Straight.

The second test session had Audi continue to lead with Rinaldo Capello in the No. 2 car with the day's fastest lap of 3:32.742. This was followed by an improved time for the Champion Racing car of Ralf Kelleners in second and Martin Brundle in Bentley's No. 8 car in third. Racing for Holland was fourth courtesy of a lap from Jan Lammers and the second Joest Audi of Frank Biela rounded out the top five. The Dick Barbour team continued to lead the LMP675 category with an improved lap of 3:44.272, ahead of the trio of drivers of the second-placed No. 38 ROC Auto Reynard 01Q and Claudia Hürtgen's No. 32 Roock/KnightHawk Racing Lola B2K/40-Nissan in third. Oliver Gavin moved the No. 60 Saleen Allen Speedlab S7R to the head of LMGTS with a lap of 3:54.344. He was followed by Johnny Mowlem's No. 62 Ray Mallock car on the soft compound tyres and Corvette's No. 63 C5-R was third-fastest in the session. Xavier Pompidou in the No. 73 Freisinger Motorsport Porsche led the LMGT class with the No. 80 Larbre car second. Fabio Babini's No. 83 Seikel Motorsport car and the No. 35 Rowan Racing Pilbeam MP84-Nissan made contact at the Ford Chicane late in the session and the former was unable to continue driving.

== Qualifying ==
There were eight hours of qualifying divided into four two-hour sessions available to every entrants on 13 and 14 June. During the sessions, all entrants were required to set a time within 110 per cent of the fastest lap established by the fastest vehicle in each of the five categories to qualify for the race. The first session took place in clear weather conditions. Audi, the pre-race favourites, led early on with a flying lap from Kristensen before his teammate Capello followed with a 3:34.880 time to go fastest overall. Kristensen stood three-tenths of a second adrift in second. Lammers followed in third and Kelleners was fourth for Champion Racing. The fastest Bentley was in fifth position after a lap from Brundle. The No. 12 Panoz of Jan Magnussen stopped after the PlayStation chicane and was then sidelined with a blocked gearbox. Anthony Reid carried the No. 34 MG-Lola EX257-Lola to provisional pole position in the LMP675 category with a time of 3:42.065 ahead of the ROC Auto Reynard and No. 36 Dick Barbour entries. The crew of MG's No. 33 car set no laps because it suffered from an alternator issue that created a misfire. The GTS class of GT was led by Ron Fellows' No. 64 Corvette, who set a 3:55.552 lap. Andy Pilgrim in the sister No. 63 Corvette was second followed by Christophe Bouchut's No. 58 Larbre Oreca in third. At the conclusion of the session, the No. 80 Larbre Porsche led in LMGT from the No. 70 Aspen Knolls MCR Callaway C12-R and the No. 72 Team Taisan Advan car.

The day's fastest laps were predicted to possibly be set within the opening 15 minutes of the second session due to lowering ambient temperatures and light levels. Kristensen improved provisional pole position to a 3:32.458 lap seven minutes into the session to be four seconds faster than Allan McNish's 2000 pole lap. He was unable to improve any further because of an electrical misfire that affected the No. 1 Audi. Capello fell to second; the No. 2 car had a power steering fault just as Christian Pescatori relieved his co-driver. Kelleners moved Champion Racing to third after a change of gearbox. Lammers of Racing for Holland fell to fourth and Brundle's No. 7 Bentley was demoted to fifth because a punctured tyre on the Mulsanne Straight sent him into the gravel trap at Mulsanne Corner. Reid MG's No. 34 car had a possible blocked fuel filter that regulated its fuel pressure; the car kept the class pole of LMP675. Kevin McGarrity elevated the sister No. 33 MG to second in class and ROC Auto fell to third. In LMGTS, Oliver Gavin's No. 60 Saleen led the session and took the provisional class pole position from Corvette Racing. Fellows crashed into a tyre barrier at the second Mulsanne Chicane and the No. 63 Corvette sustained heavy rear-end damage. He was unhurt. The sole non-Porsche car in LMGT of the Aspen Knolls MCR-entered Callaway C12 of Cort Wagner moved to the front in class with Patrice Goueslard's No. 80 Larbre car second.

Conditions were overcast for the third practice session on 14 June and some rain fell intermittently. None of the first three Audi teams improved their times from the day before as most teams focused on locating their racing setups. Lammers set the session's fastest lap at 3:34.838 to strengthen Racing for Holland's hold on fourth position and he moved to within half a second of Herbert's Champion Audi. Johanasson was second-quickest and his time moved the No. 4 Audi from eighth to fifth in the final ten minutes of the session. Jordi Gené set the fastest time in the LMP675 in the ROC Auto Reynard yet he was almost four seconds behind the class pole-sitting No. 34 MG. The LMGTS class remained the same upfront as Gavin improved the No. 60 Saleen's fastest lap time to a 3:52.849 and took a new class record. The No. 58 Larbre Oreca of Christophe Bouchut retained third place in category. The lead of LMGT changed when Goueslard's No. 80 Larbre entry took the category pole position late on before Wagner in the Aspen Knolls Callaway used his team's race engine to reclaim the position. Perspective Racing's Michel Neugarten went off the circuit and damaged the rear of the No. 75 Porsche at the PlayStation chicane. Luis Marques in the No. 74 Luc Alphand Adventure car leaked oil at the entry to the Michelin chicane due to a hose problem and marshals quickly cleaned the track. Noël del Bello's No. 79 vehicle of Georges Forgeois damaged its front-left in an accident.

As temperatures cooled in the final qualifying session due to fading light, Capello waited in his garage before he negotiated slower traffic to set a 3:32.249 lap in the No. 2 Audi and demoted Kristensen from pole position. Kristensen's No. 1 car had its damper unit and front bodywork changed and ran a race-tuned engine along with soft compound tyres; he could not better his teammate's lap because of a slow puncture when he ran into a gravel trap at the first Mulsanne Straight chicane, giving the No. 2 car pole position. Champion Racing were not able to improve their lap and took third. Lammers' third-session time secured Racing for Holland fourth and Johansson's No. 4 Audi took fifth. Anthony Reid twice reset the fastest lap in LMP675 to secure pole position for the No. 34 MG team with a 3:41.769 lap. Kevin McGarrity in the sister MG was second in class after an oil leak caused the team to change engines. Gené's ROC Auto entry took third in the category. The GT categories remained the same with the No. 60 Saleen's lap time set by Gavin giving it pole position in the GTS class and Wagner's lap in LMGT was not bettered by any other driver. Team Advan's No. 72 Porsche driven by Kazuyuki Nishizawa had an accident at the Porsche Curves and sustained damage to its front and rear.

=== Qualifying results ===
Pole position winners in each class are indicated in bold and by a ‡ The fastest time set by each entry is denoted in gray.

Pos	Class	No.	Team	Car	Day 1	Day 2	Gap	Grid
**1**	**LMP900**	**2**	**Audi Sport Team Joest**	**Audi R8**	3:33.514	**3:32.429**	—	**1‡**
2	LMP900	1	Audi Sport Team Joest	Audi R8	3:32.458	3:37.678	+0.029	2
3	LMP900	3	Champion Racing	Audi R8	3:34.349	3:38.787	+1.920	3
4	LMP900	9	Racing for Holland	Dome S101	3:36.031	3:34.838	+2.419	4
5	LMP900	4	Johansson Motorsport	Audi R8	3:37.451	3:35.128	+2.699	5
6	LMP900	16	Team PlayStation	Chrysler LMP	3:36.155	3:44.755	+3.726	6
**7**	**LMGTP**	**7**	**Team Bentley**	**Bentley EXP Speed 8**	**3:36.535**	**3:37.441**	**+4.106**	**7‡**
8	LMP900	5	DAMS	Cadillac Northstar LMP01	3:39.892	3:37.402	+4.973	8
9	LMGTP	8	Team Bentley	Bentley EXP Speed 8	3:37.408	3:38.512	+4.979	9
10	LMP900	19	SMG	Courage C60	3:38.746	3:54.156	+6.317	10
11	LMP900	15	Viper Team Oreca	Chrysler LMP	3:38.814	3:42.559	+6.385	11
12	LMP900	6	DAMS	Cadillac Northstar LMP01	3:39.596	3:41.991	+7.167	12
13	LMP900	17	Pescarolo Sport	Courage C60	3:40.926	3:39.789	+7.300	13
**14**	**LMP675**	**34**	**MG Sport & Racing Ltd.**	**MG-Lola EX257**	**3:42.065**	**3:40.243**	**+7.814**	**14‡**
15	LMP900	10	Team Den Blå Avis-Goh	Dome S101	3:42.089	3:40.958	+8.529	15
16	LMP900	14	Viper Team Oreca	Chrysler LMP	3:42.215	3:48.022	+9.786	16
17	LMP675	33	MG Sport & Racing Ltd.	MG-Lola EX257	3:42.476	3:56.274	+10.047	17
18	LMP900	20	Team Ascari	Ascari A410	3:42.931	11:18.421	+10.502	18
19	LMP900	12	Panoz Motor Sports	Panoz LMP07	3:48.083	3:42.974	+10.545	19
20	LMP900	18	Pescarolo Sport	Courage C60	3:43.924	3:43.004	+10.575	20
21	LMP900	11	Panoz Motor Sports	Panoz LMP07	3:51.969	3:43.498	+11.049	21
22	LMP900	21	Team Ascari	Ascari A410	3:46.398	3:43.663	+11.234	22
23	LMP675	38	ROC Auto	Reynard 2KQ-LM	3:48.075	3:44.198	+11.759	23
24	LMP675	36	Dick Barbour Racing	Reynard 01Q	3:49.650	3:46.008	+13.679	24
25	LMP675	30	Gérard Welter	WR LMP01	3:49.986	3:50.006	+17.557	25
**26**	**LMGTS**	**60**	**Saleen/Allen Speedlab**	**Saleen S7-R**	**3:54.190**	**3:52.849**	**+20.420**	**26‡**
27	LMGTS	63	Corvette Racing Pratt	Chevrolet Corvette C5-R	3:55.552	3:59.399	+23.123	27
28	LMGTS	58	Larbre Compétition	Chrysler Viper GTS-R	3:58.658	3:56.838	+24.609	28
29	LMGTS	64	Corvette Racing Pratt	Chevrolet Corvette C5-R	3:58.209	3:57.052	+24.803	29
30	LMP675	32	Roock-KnightHawk	Lola B2K/40	3:57.942	3:57.099	+24.850	30
31	LMP675	37	Dick Barbour Racing	Reynard 01Q	3:58.533	3:57.257	+25.028	31
32	LMGTS	62	RML	Saleen S7-R	4:02.022	3:58.626	+26.297	32
33	LMGTS	61	Konrad Motorsport	Saleen S7-R	4:03.135	3:58.868	+26.439	33
34	LMP675	35	S+R Rowan Racing Ltd.	Pilbeam MP84	4:14.269	3:59.302	+26.873	34
35	LMGTS	57	Equipe de France FFSA	Chrysler Viper GTS-R	4:00.790	4:02.181	+28.341	35
36	LMGTS	56	Paul Belmondo Racing	Chrysler Viper GTS-R	4:02.148	4:02.183	+29.719	36
37	LMGTS	55	Paul Belmondo Racing	Chrysler Viper GTS-R	4:06.329	4:02.791	+30.362	37
**38**	**LMGT**	**70**	**Aspen Knolls MCR**	**Callaway C12-R**	**4:13.063**	**4:10.168**	**+37.738**	**38**
39	LMGT	80	Larbre Compétition	Porsche 911 GT3-RS	4:13.834	4:11.738	+38.509	39
40	LMGT	83	Seikel Motorsport	Porsche 911 GT3-RS	4:15.167	4:11.787	+38.547	40
41	LMGT	72	Team Taisan Advan	Porsche 911 GT3-RS	4:18.010	4:13.158	+40.729	41‡
42	LMGT	77	Freisinger Motorsport	Porsche 911 GT3-RS	4:18.918	4:13.816	+41.587	42
43	LMGT	79	Noël del Bello	Porsche 911 GT3-RS	4:18.573	4:24.058	+46.143	43
44	LMGT	76	PK Sport Ltd-Ricardo	Porsche 911 GT3-RS	4:18.625	4:23.422	+46.196	44
45	LMGT	74	Luc Alphand Adventure	Porsche 911 GT3-RS	4:18.926	4:24.814	+46.427	45
46	LMGT	82	Seikel Motorsport	Porsche 911 GT3-RS	4:23.973	4:19.445	+47.216	46
47	LMGT	75	Perspective Racing	Porsche 911 GT3-RS	4:20.667	4:38.786	+48.238	47
48	LMGT	71	Racing Engineering	Porsche 911 GT3-RS	4:30.143	4:24.840	+52.391	48

== Warm-up ==
The drivers took to the track at 09:00 local time on 16 June for a 45-minute warm-up session. It was held on a damp track after overnight rain; teams focused on systems checks, setting up their cars against the weather of the time, tried several tyre compounds and ensuring their drivers had some driving experience. Christian Pescatori's No. 2 Audi lapped fastest at 3:40.497, ahead of Pirro's sister No. 1 Joest Audi, the highest-placed Bentley of Guy Smith's No. 7 car, Sébastien Bourdais in Pescarolo Sport's No. 17 C60 and Éric Bernard's No. 5 DAMS Cadillac Northstar LMP. The ROC Auto Reynard set the fastest LMP675 lap at 3:51.491. RML's No. 62 Saleen paced the LMGTS category and the Aspen Knolls MCR Callaway led in LMGT. Klaus Graf's No. 11 Panoz had a tyre issue and went into the gravel trap at the exit to Indianapolis corner from which marshals extricated him. Corvette's No. 64 car stopped at the Dunlop Bridge with a broken oil pump belt and the No. 80 Larbre Porsche leaked oil from its underside due to a possible fuel system fault.

== Race ==
220,000 people attended the event. Audi's top two finishers had to share the podium with a Bentley interloper, but their margin over third place was formidable.

Corvette Racing's achievement of a GTS class win was sullied by a slow pace and the presence of two GT class Porsche 911s in front of them. It was the last time a Porsche team would finish in front of the GTS class until they had the class-consolidating 4.0 liter 997 GT3 RSR in their possession, in 2010.

== Official results ==
Pos	Class	No	Team	Drivers	Chassis	Tyre	Laps
Pos	Class	No	Team	Drivers	Engine	Tyre	Laps
1	LMP900	1	(Germany) Audi Sport Team Joest	(Germany) Frank Biela (Italy) Emanuele Pirro (Denmark) Tom Kristensen	Audi R8	M	321
1	LMP900	1	(Germany) Audi Sport Team Joest	(Germany) Frank Biela (Italy) Emanuele Pirro (Denmark) Tom Kristensen	Audi 3.6 L Turbo V8	M	321
2	LMP900	2	(Germany) Audi Sport North America	(France) Laurent Aïello (Italy) Rinaldo Capello (Italy) Christian Pescatori	Audi R8	M	320
2	LMP900	2	(Germany) Audi Sport North America	(France) Laurent Aïello (Italy) Rinaldo Capello (Italy) Christian Pescatori	Audi 3.6 L Turbo V8	M	320
3	LMGTP	8	(United Kingdom) Team Bentley	(United Kingdom) Andy Wallace (United States) Butch Leitzinger (Belgium) Eric van de Poele	Bentley EXP Speed 8	D	306
3	LMGTP	8	(United Kingdom) Team Bentley	(United Kingdom) Andy Wallace (United States) Butch Leitzinger (Belgium) Eric van de Poele	Bentley 3.6 L Turbo V8	D	306
4	LMP900	16	(France) Team PlayStation	(Monaco) Olivier Beretta (Austria) Karl Wendlinger (Portugal) Pedro Lamy	Chrysler LMP	M	298
4	LMP900	16	(France) Team PlayStation	(Monaco) Olivier Beretta (Austria) Karl Wendlinger (Portugal) Pedro Lamy	Mopar 6.0 L V8	M	298
5	LMP675	38	(France) ROC Auto	(Spain) Jordi Gené (Switzerland) Jean-Denis Délétraz (France) Pascal Fabre	Reynard 2KQ-LM	M	284
5	LMP675	38	(France) ROC Auto	(Spain) Jordi Gené (Switzerland) Jean-Denis Délétraz (France) Pascal Fabre	Volkswagen HPT16 2.0 L Turbo I4	M	284
6	LMGT	83	(Germany) Seikel Motorsport	(Italy) Gabrio Rosa (Italy) Fabio Babini (Italy) Luca Drudi	Porsche 911 GT3-RS	Y	283
6	LMGT	83	(Germany) Seikel Motorsport	(Italy) Gabrio Rosa (Italy) Fabio Babini (Italy) Luca Drudi	Porsche 3.6 L Flat-6	Y	283
7	LMGT	77	(Germany) Freisinger Motorsport	(United States) Gunnar Jeannette (France) Romain Dumas (France) Philippe Haezebrouck	Porsche 911 GT3-RS	Y	282
7	LMGT	77	(Germany) Freisinger Motorsport	(United States) Gunnar Jeannette (France) Romain Dumas (France) Philippe Haezebrouck	Porsche 3.6 L Flat-6	Y	282
8	LMGTS	63	(United States) Corvette Racing Pratt	(Canada) Ron Fellows (United States) Scott Pruett (United States) Johnny O'Connell	Chevrolet Corvette C5-R	G	278
8	LMGTS	63	(United States) Corvette Racing Pratt	(Canada) Ron Fellows (United States) Scott Pruett (United States) Johnny O'Connell	Chevrolet LS7R 7.0 L V8	G	278
9	LMGT	75	(France) Perspective Racing	(France) Thierry Perrier (Belgium) Michel Neugarten (United Kingdom) Nigel Smith	Porsche 911 GT3-RS	D	275
9	LMGT	75	(France) Perspective Racing	(France) Thierry Perrier (Belgium) Michel Neugarten (United Kingdom) Nigel Smith	Porsche 3.6 L Flat-6	D	275
10	LMGT	80	(France) Larbre Compétition	(France) Jean-Luc Chéreau (France) Patrice Goueslard (France) Sébastien Dumez	Porsche 911 GT3-RS	M	274
10	LMGT	80	(France) Larbre Compétition	(France) Jean-Luc Chéreau (France) Patrice Goueslard (France) Sébastien Dumez	Porsche 3.6 L Flat-6	M	274
11	LMGT	72	(Japan) Team Taisan Advan	(Japan) Hideo Fukuyama (Japan) Atsushi Yogo (Japan) Kazuyuki Nishizawa	Porsche 911 GT3-RS	Y	273
11	LMGT	72	(Japan) Team Taisan Advan	(Japan) Hideo Fukuyama (Japan) Atsushi Yogo (Japan) Kazuyuki Nishizawa	Porsche 3.6 L Flat-6	Y	273
12	LMGT	82	(Germany) Seikel Motorsport	(Canada) Tony Burgess (Morocco) Max Cohen-Olivar (New Zealand) Andrew Bagnall	Porsche 911 GT3-RS	Y	272
12	LMGT	82	(Germany) Seikel Motorsport	(Canada) Tony Burgess (Morocco) Max Cohen-Olivar (New Zealand) Andrew Bagnall	Porsche 3.6 L Flat-6	Y	272
13	LMP900	17	(France) Pescarolo Sport	(France) Sébastien Bourdais (France) Jean-Christophe Boullion (France) Laurent Rédon	Courage C60	M	271
13	LMP900	17	(France) Pescarolo Sport	(France) Sébastien Bourdais (France) Jean-Christophe Boullion (France) Laurent Rédon	Peugeot A32 3.2 L Turbo V6	M	271
14	LMGTS	64	(United States) Corvette Racing Pratt	(United States) Andy Pilgrim (United States) Kelly Collins (France) Franck Fréon	Chevrolet Corvette C5-R	G	271
14	LMGTS	64	(United States) Corvette Racing Pratt	(United States) Andy Pilgrim (United States) Kelly Collins (France) Franck Fréon	Chevrolet LS7R 7.0 L V8	G	271
15	LMP900	6	(France) DAMS	(South Africa) Wayne Taylor (Italy) Max Angelelli (France) Christophe Tinseau	Cadillac Northstar LMP01	M	270
15	LMP900	6	(France) DAMS	(South Africa) Wayne Taylor (Italy) Max Angelelli (France) Christophe Tinseau	Cadillac Northstar 4.0 L Turbo V8	M	270
16	LMGT	76	(United Kingdom) PK Sport Ltd-Ricardo	(United Kingdom) Mike Youles (United Kingdom) Davey Warnock (United Kingdom) Stephen Day	Porsche 911 GT3-RS	D	265
16	LMGT	76	(United Kingdom) PK Sport Ltd-Ricardo	(United Kingdom) Mike Youles (United Kingdom) Davey Warnock (United Kingdom) Stephen Day	Porsche 3.6 L Flat-6	D	265
17	LMGT	74	(France) Luc Alphand Adventure	(France) Luc Alphand (France) Michel Ligonnet (France) Luis Marques	Porsche 911 GT3-R	M	265
17	LMGT	74	(France) Luc Alphand Adventure	(France) Luc Alphand (France) Michel Ligonnet (France) Luis Marques	Porsche 3.6 L Flat-6	M	265
18	LMGTS	60	(United States) Saleen/Allen Speedlab	(Austria) Franz Konrad (United Kingdom) Oliver Gavin (United States) Terry Borcheller	Saleen S7-R	G	246
18	LMGTS	60	(United States) Saleen/Allen Speedlab	(Austria) Franz Konrad (United Kingdom) Oliver Gavin (United States) Terry Borcheller	Ford 6.9 L V8	G	246
19	LMP675	30	(France) Gérard Welter	(France) Stéphane Daoudi (Japan) Yojiro Terada (France) Jean-René de Fournoux	WR LMP01	M	245
19	LMP675	30	(France) Gérard Welter	(France) Stéphane Daoudi (Japan) Yojiro Terada (France) Jean-René de Fournoux	Peugeot 2.0L Turbo I4	M	245
20	LMGTS	58	(France) Larbre Compétition	(France) Christophe Bouchut (France) Jean-Philippe Belloc (Portugal) Tiago Monteiro	Chrysler Viper GTS-R	M	234
20	LMGTS	58	(France) Larbre Compétition	(France) Christophe Bouchut (France) Jean-Philippe Belloc (Portugal) Tiago Monteiro	Chrysler 8.0 L V10	M	234
NC	LMGT	79	(France) Noël del Bello	(France) Sylvain Noël (France) Jean-Luc Maury-Laribière (France) Georges Forgeois	Porsche 911 GT3-R	D	193
NC	LMGT	79	(France) Noël del Bello	(France) Sylvain Noël (France) Jean-Luc Maury-Laribière (France) Georges Forgeois	Porsche 3.6 L Flat-6	D	193
DNF	LMP900	14	(France) Viper Team Oreca	(Japan) Seiji Ara (Japan) Masahiko Kondo (Portugal) Ni Amorim	Chrysler LMP	M	243
DNF	LMP900	14	(France) Viper Team Oreca	(Japan) Seiji Ara (Japan) Masahiko Kondo (Portugal) Ni Amorim	Mopar 6.0 L V8	M	243
DNF	LMGTS	62	(United Kingdom) RML	(United Kingdom) Johnny Mowlem (United Kingdom) Ian McKellar (Belgium) Bruno Lambert	Saleen S7-R	D	175
DNF	LMGTS	62	(United Kingdom) RML	(United Kingdom) Johnny Mowlem (United Kingdom) Ian McKellar (Belgium) Bruno Lambert	Ford 6.9 L V8	D	175
DNF	LMP900	9	(Netherlands) Racing for Holland	(Netherlands) Jan Lammers (Netherlands) Donny Crevels (Belgium) Val Hillebrand	Dome S101	M	156
DNF	LMP900	9	(Netherlands) Racing for Holland	(Netherlands) Jan Lammers (Netherlands) Donny Crevels (Belgium) Val Hillebrand	Judd GV4 4.0 L V10	M	156
DNF	LMP900	20	(United Kingdom) Team Ascari	(South Africa) Werner Lupberger (United Kingdom) Ben Collins (Finland) Harri Toivonen	Ascari A410	G	134
DNF	LMP900	20	(United Kingdom) Team Ascari	(South Africa) Werner Lupberger (United Kingdom) Ben Collins (Finland) Harri Toivonen	Judd GV4 4.0 L V10	G	134
DNF	LMP900	15	(France) Viper Team Oreca	(France) Yannick Dalmas (France) Stéphane Sarrazin (France) Franck Montagny	Chrysler LMP	M	126
DNF	LMP900	15	(France) Viper Team Oreca	(France) Yannick Dalmas (France) Stéphane Sarrazin (France) Franck Montagny	Mopar 6.0 L V8	M	126
DNF	LMGT	70	(United States) Aspen Knolls MCR	(United States) Bob Mazzuoccola (United States) Vic Rice (United States) Cort Wagner	Callaway C12-R	G	98
DNF	LMGT	70	(United States) Aspen Knolls MCR	(United States) Bob Mazzuoccola (United States) Vic Rice (United States) Cort Wagner	Chevrolet 7.0 L V8	G	98
DNF	LMP675	36	(United States) Dick Barbour Racing	(Belgium) Didier de Radiguès (Germany) Sascha Maassen (Japan) Hideshi Matsuda	Reynard 01Q	G	95
DNF	LMP675	36	(United States) Dick Barbour Racing	(Belgium) Didier de Radiguès (Germany) Sascha Maassen (Japan) Hideshi Matsuda	Judd KV675 3.4 L V8	G	95
DNF	LMP675	32	(United States) Roock-KnightHawk	(Germany) Claudia Hürtgen (United States) Rick Fairbanks (United States) Chris Gleason	Lola B2K/40	A	94
DNF	LMP675	32	(United States) Roock-KnightHawk	(Germany) Claudia Hürtgen (United States) Rick Fairbanks (United States) Chris Gleason	Nissan 3.4 L V6	A	94
DNF	LMP675	33	(United Kingdom) MG Sport & Racing Ltd.	(United Kingdom) Julian Bailey (United Kingdom) Mark Blundell (United Kingdom) Kevin McGarrity	MG-Lola EX257	M	92
DNF	LMP675	33	(United Kingdom) MG Sport & Racing Ltd.	(United Kingdom) Julian Bailey (United Kingdom) Mark Blundell (United Kingdom) Kevin McGarrity	MG XP20 2.0 L Turbo I4	M	92
DNF	LMP900	11	(United States) Panoz Motor Sports	(Germany) Klaus Graf (United Kingdom) Jamie Davies (South Africa) Gary Formato	Panoz LMP07	M	86
DNF	LMP900	11	(United States) Panoz Motor Sports	(Germany) Klaus Graf (United Kingdom) Jamie Davies (South Africa) Gary Formato	Élan 4.0 L V8	M	86
DNF	LMP900	12	(United States) Panoz Motor Sports	(Australia) David Brabham (Denmark) Jan Magnussen (France) Franck Lagorce	Panoz LMP07	M	85
DNF	LMP900	12	(United States) Panoz Motor Sports	(Australia) David Brabham (Denmark) Jan Magnussen (France) Franck Lagorce	Élan 4.0 L V8	M	85
DNF	LMP900	3	(United States) Champion Racing	(United Kingdom) Johnny Herbert (Belgium) Didier Theys (Germany) Ralf Kelleners	Audi R8	M	81
DNF	LMP900	3	(United States) Champion Racing	(United Kingdom) Johnny Herbert (Belgium) Didier Theys (Germany) Ralf Kelleners	Audi 3.6 L Turbo V8	M	81
DNF	LMP900	10	(Denmark) Team Den Blå Avis-Goh	(Denmark) John Nielsen (Japan) Hiroki Katoh (Denmark) Casper Elgaard	Dome S101	G	66
DNF	LMP900	10	(Denmark) Team Den Blå Avis-Goh	(Denmark) John Nielsen (Japan) Hiroki Katoh (Denmark) Casper Elgaard	Judd GV4 4.0 L V10	G	66
DNF	LMP900	21	(United Kingdom) Team Ascari	(Netherlands) Klaas Zwart (France) Xavier Pompidou (Canada) Scott Maxwell	Ascari A410	G	66
DNF	LMP900	21	(United Kingdom) Team Ascari	(Netherlands) Klaas Zwart (France) Xavier Pompidou (Canada) Scott Maxwell	Judd GV4 4.0 L V10	G	66
DNF	LMGTS	55	(France) Paul Belmondo Racing	(Belgium) Vincent Vosse (Belgium) Vanina Ickx (Sweden) Carl Rosenblad	Chrysler Viper GTS-R	D	61
DNF	LMGTS	55	(France) Paul Belmondo Racing	(Belgium) Vincent Vosse (Belgium) Vanina Ickx (Sweden) Carl Rosenblad	Chrysler 8.0 L V10	D	61
DNF	LMGTP	7	(United Kingdom) Team Bentley	(United Kingdom) Martin Brundle (Monaco) Stéphane Ortelli (United Kingdom) Guy Smith	Bentley EXP Speed 8	D	56
DNF	LMGTP	7	(United Kingdom) Team Bentley	(United Kingdom) Martin Brundle (Monaco) Stéphane Ortelli (United Kingdom) Guy Smith	Bentley 3.6 L Turbo V8	D	56
DNF	LMP900	5	(France) DAMS	(France) Éric Bernard (France) Emmanuel Collard (Belgium) Marc Goossens	Cadillac Northstar LMP01	M	56
DNF	LMP900	5	(France) DAMS	(France) Éric Bernard (France) Emmanuel Collard (Belgium) Marc Goossens	Cadillac Northstar 4.0 L Turbo V8	M	56
DNF	LMP900	19	(France) SMG	(France) Philippe Gache (France) Jérôme Policand (France) Anthony Beltoise	Courage C60	M	51
DNF	LMP900	19	(France) SMG	(France) Philippe Gache (France) Jérôme Policand (France) Anthony Beltoise	Judd GV4 4.0 L V10	M	51
DNF	LMGTS	56	(France) Paul Belmondo Racing	(France) Grégoire de Galzain (Belgium) Anthony Kumpen (France) Jean-Claude Lagniez	Chrysler Viper GTS-R	D	44
DNF	LMGTS	56	(France) Paul Belmondo Racing	(France) Grégoire de Galzain (Belgium) Anthony Kumpen (France) Jean-Claude Lagniez	Chrysler 8.0 L V10	D	44
DNF	LMGT	71	(Spain) Racing Engineering	(United Kingdom) Robin Donovan (United States) Terry Lingner (United States) Chris MacAllister	Porsche 911 GT3-R	D	44
DNF	LMGT	71	(Spain) Racing Engineering	(United Kingdom) Robin Donovan (United States) Terry Lingner (United States) Chris MacAllister	Porsche 3.6 L Flat-6	D	44
DNF	LMP900	18	(France) Pescarolo Sport	(France) Emmanuel Clérico (France) Didier Cottaz (France) Boris Derichebourg	Courage C60	M	42
DNF	LMP900	18	(France) Pescarolo Sport	(France) Emmanuel Clérico (France) Didier Cottaz (France) Boris Derichebourg	Peugeot A32 3.2 L Turbo V6	M	42
DNF	LMP900	4	(United Kingdom) Johansson Motorsport	(Sweden) Stefan Johansson (Netherlands) Tom Coronel (France) Patrick Lemarié	Audi R8	M	35
DNF	LMP900	4	(United Kingdom) Johansson Motorsport	(Sweden) Stefan Johansson (Netherlands) Tom Coronel (France) Patrick Lemarié	Audi 3.6 L Turbo V8	M	35
DNF	LMP675	34	(United Kingdom) MG Sport & Racing Ltd.	(United Kingdom) Anthony Reid (United Kingdom) Warren Hughes (United Kingdom) Jonny Kane	MG-Lola EX257	M	30
DNF	LMP675	34	(United Kingdom) MG Sport & Racing Ltd.	(United Kingdom) Anthony Reid (United Kingdom) Warren Hughes (United Kingdom) Jonny Kane	MG XP20 2.0 L Turbo I4	M	30
DNF	LMP675	37	(United States) Dick Barbour Racing	(Canada) John Graham (Venezuela) Milka Duno (United States) David Murry	Reynard 01Q	G	4
DNF	LMP675	37	(United States) Dick Barbour Racing	(Canada) John Graham (Venezuela) Milka Duno (United States) David Murry	Judd KV675 3.4 L V8	G	4
DNF	LMGTS	61	(Germany) Konrad Motorsport	(Switzerland) Walter Brun (Switzerland) Toni Seiler (United States) Charles Slater	Saleen S7-R	G	4
DNF	LMGTS	61	(Germany) Konrad Motorsport	(Switzerland) Walter Brun (Switzerland) Toni Seiler (United States) Charles Slater	Ford 6.9 L V8	G	4
DNF	LMGTS	57	Equipe de France FFSA	(France) David Terrien (France) Jonathan Cochet (France) Jean-Philippe Dayraut	Chrysler Viper GTS-R	M	4
DNF	LMGTS	57	Equipe de France FFSA	(France) David Terrien (France) Jonathan Cochet (France) Jean-Philippe Dayraut	Chrysler 8.0 L V10	M	4
DNF	LMP675	35	(United Kingdom) S+R Rowan Racing Ltd.	(Republic of Ireland) Warren Carway (United Kingdom) Martin O'Connell (France) François Migault	Pilbeam MP84	A	3
DNF	LMP675	35	(United Kingdom) S+R Rowan Racing Ltd.	(Republic of Ireland) Warren Carway (United Kingdom) Martin O'Connell (France) François Migault	Nissan VQL 3.0 L V6	A	3

- Distance – 4381.65 km
- Average Speed – 180.949 km/h
- Highest Trap Speed – Audi R8 – 318 km/h (race), Dome Judd S101 – 335 km/h (Practice)
