= John Bintcliffe =

British racing driver (born 1966)

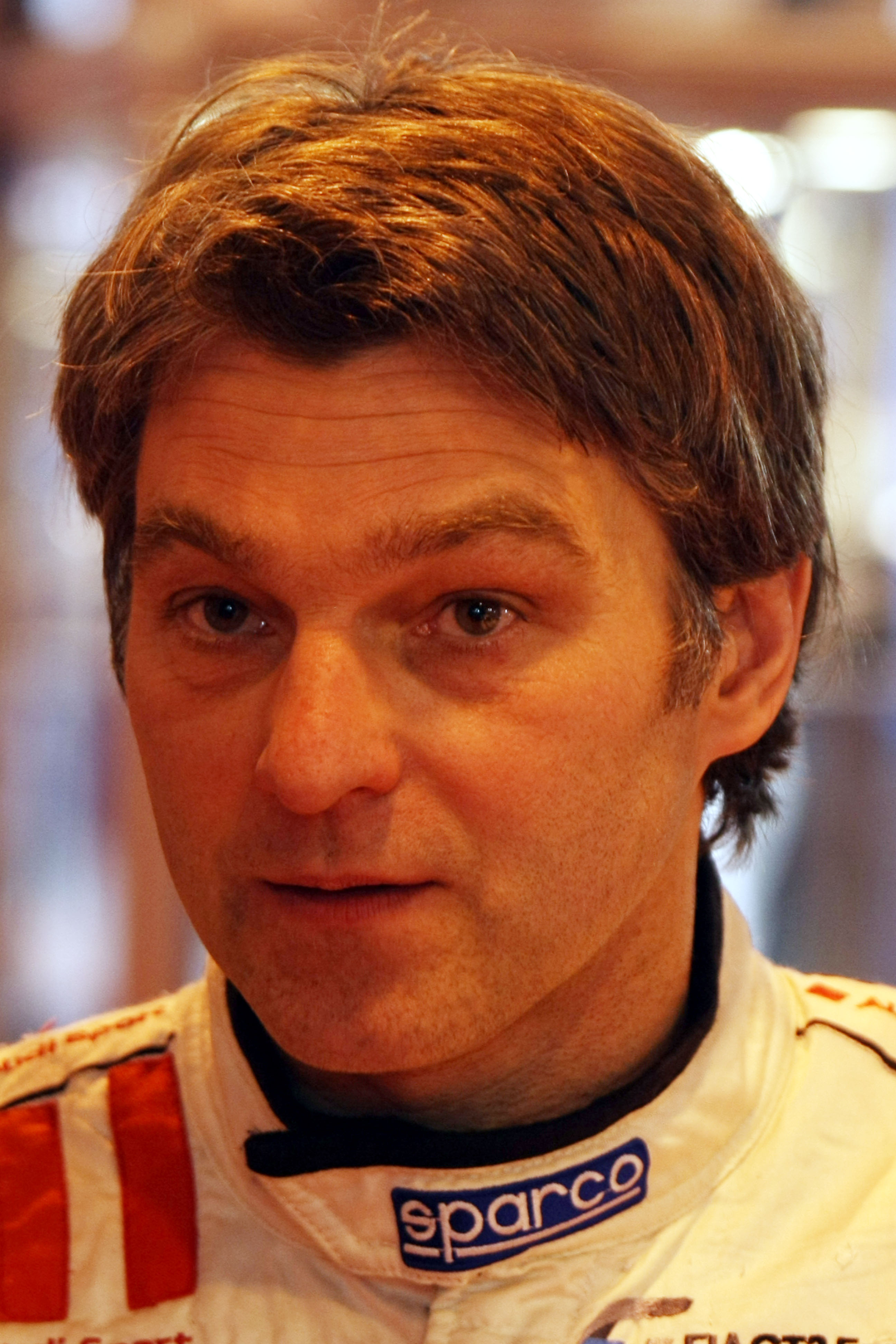
- Bintcliffe in 2011
- Nationality: (United Kingdom) British
- Born: 7 February 1966 (age 60) Bridlington, East Riding of Yorkshire, England

British Touring Car Championship
- Years active: 1996–1998
- Teams: Audi Sport UK
- Starts: 76
- Wins: 2
- Poles: 1
- Fastest laps: 1
- Best finish: 7th in 1996, 1997

Championship titles
- 1995 1994 1993: Ford Credit Fiesta; Renault Clio Cup; Honda CR-X Challenge

John Simon Bintcliffe (born 7 February 1966 in Bridlington, East Riding of Yorkshire, England) is a British racing driver. He has been involved in the British Touring Car Championship as both driver and team owner.

Bintcliffe competed in the Honda CR-X Challenge in 1993, and won the Renault Clio Cup in 1994, and the Ford Credit Fiesta series in 1995.

Bintcliffe competed in the British Touring Car Championship for Audi from 1996 to 1998, teamed with series champions Frank Biela and Yvan Muller. Due to its Quattro 4-wheel drive system, Audi initially had the best car, and despite his lack of experience, Bintcliffe was able to twice finish seventh in the championship, taking two race wins against many higher profile drivers. However, the team struggled in 1998, and Bintcliffe was 15th overall, only just ahead of independent champion Tommy Rustad. This may be an unfair reflection on Bintcliffe, given teammate Muller's success; in the same year, Frank Biela only mustered 14th place in the German equivalent series, using the same 2-wheel drive Audi.

Bintcliffe is the team manager for the Bintcliffe Sport team, based on the Barr Lane estate in York. Having run Paul O'Neill in the MGF Cup, they raced in the BTCC's Class B in 2000 (with Rob Collard among their drivers), and the equivalent Production Class in 2001. They also ran Jason Plato and Darren Manning in ASCAR.

Bintcliffe returned to racing in 2011 racing in an Audi R8 LMS in the British GT championship for United Autosports.

Bintcliffe is now director of Donotbend Ltd., a designer furniture outlet based in Minskip near York.

== Racing record ==
=== Complete British Touring Car Championship results ===
(key) (Races in bold indicate pole position – 1 point awarded all races) (Races in italics indicate fastest lap) (* signifies that driver lead feature race for at least one lap – 1 point awarded 1998 only)

Year	Team	Car	1	2	3	4	5	6	7	8	9	10	11	12	13	14	15	16	17	18	19	20	21	22	23	24	25	26	Pos	Pts
1996	Audi Sport UK	Audi A4 quattro	DON; 1; 6	DON; 2; 4	BRH; 1; 16	BRH; 2; 5	THR; 1; 2	THR; 2; 7	SIL; 1; 7	SIL; 2; 3	OUL; 1; 3	OUL; 2; 3	SNE; 1; 6	SNE; 2; 6	BRH; 1; 11	BRH; 2; 13	SIL; 1; 11	SIL; 2; 10	KNO; 1; 2	KNO; 2; 4	OUL; 1 Ret	OUL; 2; 9	THR; 1; 6	THR; 2; 11	DON; 1; 8	DON; 2; 13	BRH; 1; 9	BRH; 2; 10	**7th**	**113**
1997	Audi Sport UK	Audi A4 quattro	DON; 1; 5	DON; 2; 5	SIL; 1 Ret	SIL; 2 Ret	THR; 1; 4	THR; 2; 8	BRH; 1 Ret	BRH; 2; 12	OUL; 1; 4	OUL; 2; 5	DON; 1; 3	DON; 2; 4	CRO; 1; 9	CRO; 2; 6	**KNO**; **1**; 1	KNO; 2; 2	SNE; 1; 12	SNE; 2; 11	THR; 1; 1	THR; 2; 5	BRH; 1; 4	BRH; 2; 11	SIL; 1; 11	SIL; 2 Ret			**7th**	**118**
1998	Audi Sport UK	Audi A4	THR; 1; 11	THR; 2; 9	SIL; 1; 14	SIL; 2; 17	DON; 1; 10	DON; 2; 14	BRH; 1; 10	BRH; 2; 8	OUL; 1; 9	OUL; 2; 8*	DON; 1 Ret	DON; 2; 9	CRO; 1 Ret	CRO; 2; 11	SNE; 1; 14	SNE; 2; 7	THR; 1; 11	THR; 2; 8	KNO; 1 Ret	KNO; 2; 10	BRH; 1; 13	BRH; 2; 11	OUL; 1 NC	OUL; 2 Ret	SIL; 1; 12	SIL; 2 Ret	**15th**	**23**

=== Complete British GT Championship results ===
(key) (Races in bold indicate pole position in class) (Races in italics indicate fastest lap in class)

Year	Team	Car	Class	1	2	3	4	5	6	7	8	9	10	DC	Pts
2011	United Autosports	Audi R8 LMS	GT3	OUL; 1 Ret	OUL; 2; 11	SNE; 5	BRH; 8	SPA; 1 Ret	SPA; 2; 10	ROC; 1; 14	ROC; 2 DSQ	DON; DNS	SIL; 14	**15th**	**23**
