= Dave Cook Racing =

Dave Cook Racing Services
- Founded: 1983
- Folded: 2007
- Team principal(s): Dave Cook
- Former series: British Touring Car Championship British Thundersaloon Championship Asia-Pacific Touring Car Championship South African Touring Car Championship

Dave Cook Racing Services (DCRS) was a motorsports team, maintenance and repair service and racecar builder based in Sheriff Hutton, Yorkshire

== Origins ==
Dave Cook (born in November 1949) had co-run the CC Racing Developments team with Peter Clark in the 1970s, running Gordon Spice in a Ford Capri in the British Saloon Car Championship. Success was immediate, with Spice winning his class first time out. Eventually, Cook founded his own team in 1983, and thanks to a previous relationship with General Motors in which CC Racing had built Opel Monza chassis for the British Production Car Championship, landed a deal to prepare Group A specification Monzas to be run for the GM Dealer-Vauxhall Sport team, driven by Tony Lanfranchi in the BSCC for 1983. Lanfranchi won the Class A category that season, but only after the works Austin Rover team was disqualified over homologation irregularities with the Rover SD1, costing Steve Soper the championship outright.

== Thundersaloons ==
Continuing their relationship with GM and Vauxhall, DCRS ran Lanfranchi in a works Class D GM Dealer Vauxhall Nova in the BSCC in 1986, winning the class with two wins and a second place. Building on the factory backing by GM, Cook was commissioned by Vauxhall to run an ex Holden Dealer Team Commodore VK in the British Thundersaloon Championship in 1986 badged as a Vauxhall Senator. The season was a great success, John Cleland won the championship and for 1987, DCRS was tasked with the design and build of the Vauxhall Carltons for Cleland and Vince Woodman. The cars clearly had potential, which was proved the following year, winning the championship outright in 1988.

== Touring Cars ==
The success with the Thundersaloon series inspired Vauxhall to re-enter the British Touring Car Championship in 1989, once again turning to DCRS to prepare the cars. The season was another triumph as Cleland dominated his class in an Astra GTE, winning eleven of the thirteen races in Class C and won the championship outright by one point from James Weaver.

For 1990, the BTCC rules were changed to a two class system for cars of up to and over 2.0 litre specification in preparation for a wholesale change to the Super Touring regulations in 1991. Vauxhall swapped chassis to the new Cavalier GSi, which was used throughout the early 1990s, run under the Vauxhall Sport banner. Initially the Cavalier was run on a rear wheel drive platform, but when this proved uncompetitive, DCRS switched to a more conventional front wheel drive setup. Cleland took four class wins in 1990, breaking the domination of the BMW M3, but finished second in class to Frank Sytner. Cleland's teammate, double champion Chris Hodgetts retired at the end of the season.

Following the switch to the single class formula, Cleland finished runner up in 1991 to Will Hoy driving for BMW, despite winning more races than Hoy, including taking Vauxhall's first outright race win at Thruxton. The Dunlop tyres the team was using were seen as the problem, so DCRS switched to more competitive Yokohama rubber the following year.

The team hit the ground running in 1992, and had by far the best car until halfway through the season. Both Cleland and teammate Jeff Allam were in the running for the title, but BMW caught up after development work on their new 318iS model. Cleland ended up finishing third in controversial circumstances after leading the championship all season. The season finale saw a three-way fight between Cleland, Hoy and Tim Harvey, which went in favour of Harvey after his teammate Steve Soper eliminated Cleland from the race, although Vauxhall claimed the manufacturers' championship ahead of BMW and Toyota. Despite DCRS continually developing the Cavalier, the following year Cleland and Vauxhall had no answer for Joachim Winkelhock and the Schnitzer BMW team, who wrapped up the championship with ease, with Cleland ending the season in fourth, although Vauxhall finished as best of the rest behind BMW.

In 1992, DCRS sold several Cavalier chassis to the privateer Ecurie Ecosse team, whose cars were re-engineered and run by Ray Mallock. In short order the Ray Mallock Cavaliers began to outperform the works cars, which eventually led to them gaining the works contract from Vauxhall for 1994. With no deal to fall back on, DCRS disappeared from the BTCC paddock, picking up a contract from Toyota Motorsport to run and prepare race cars around the world.

== Later years ==
As a result of the Toyota deal, DCRS prepared production and touring spec cars for teams in Europe, including Toyota Supras for the Martin brothers in Belgium and Toyota Carinas built for Team Tasman, running in the Schedule S Touring Car Class in New Zealand. This team featured Julian Bailey in its driver line up, who finished runner up in 1995. DCRS also prepared Toyota Camrys for the South African championship and Carinas, which ran in the Asia-Pacific Touring Car Championship.

In 1997, DCRS re-entered the BTCC, running an ex-works privateer BMW 320i for Colin Gallie. In the early 2000s, DCRS prepared parts for the Lexus BTCC effort, until Dave Cook voluntarily wound the team down.
