= Robb Gravett =

British racing driver (born 1956)

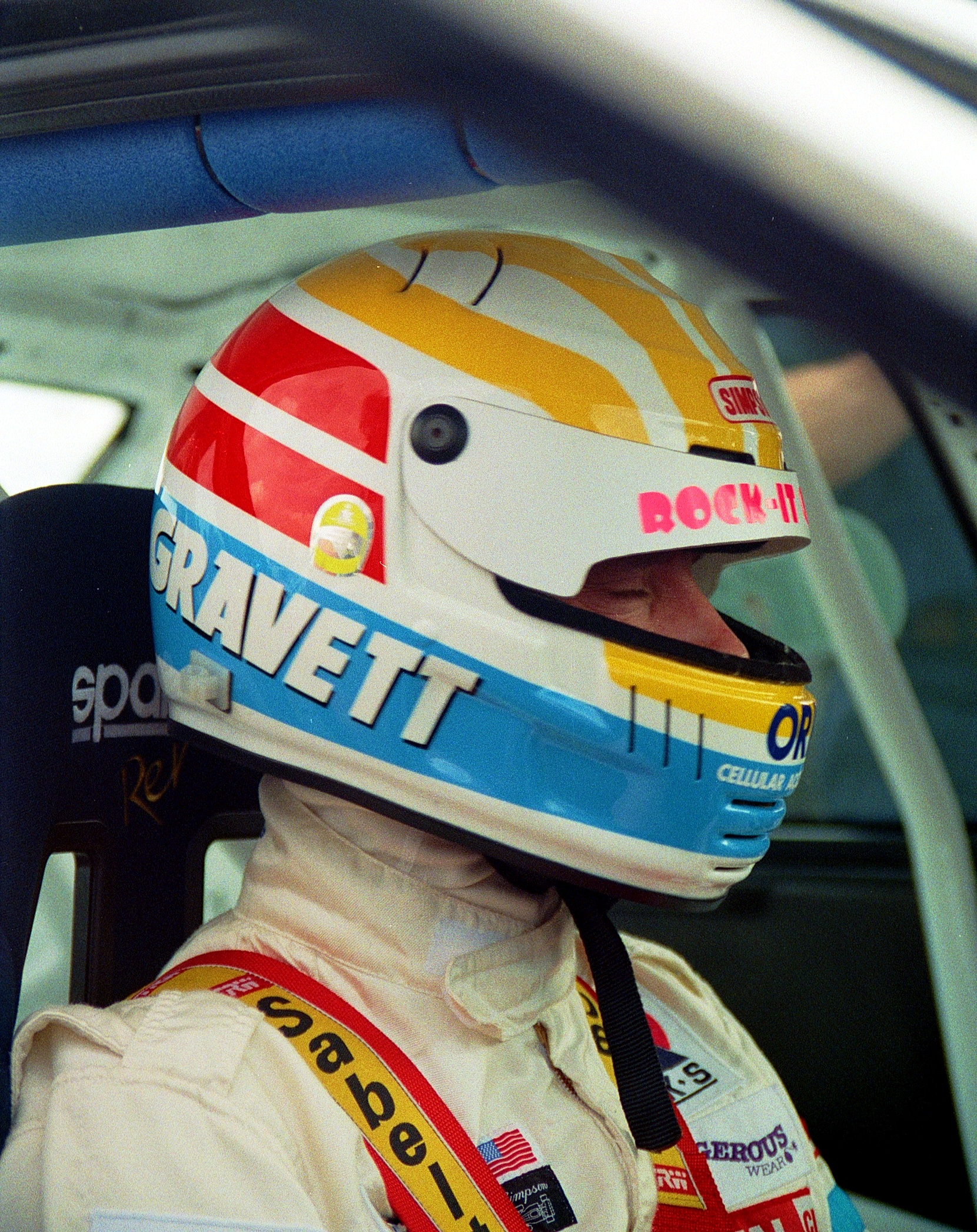
- Gravett in 1995
- Nationality: (United Kingdom) British
- Born: Robert Frederick Gravett; 10 May 1956 (age 70) London, England

British Touring Car Championship
- Years active: 1987–1998
- Teams: Graham Hathaway Racing; ICS plc Trakstar Motorsport; Peugeot Talbot Sport; Team Mondeo; Roy Kennedy Racing; Foesport; Team Dynamics; Rock-It Cargo; Brookes Motorsport
- Starts: 152
- Wins: 13
- Poles: 14
- Fastest laps: 16
- Best finish: 1st in 1990

Championship titles
- 1990 1990 1997: British Touring Car Championship; BTCC - Class A BTCC Independents Cup

Robert Frederick Gravett (born 10 May 1956) (Note: His birth date is sometimes noted as 2 May 1956.) is a British retired racing driver and team owner from London. He started his motorsport career on two wheels, racing Moto Cross at the age of 12. By the age of 15, he was already British champion, but decided to switch to four-wheeled racing in his early 20s. Gravett began racing cars in 1978, eventually entering the British Touring Car Championship in 1987.

Gravett won the 1987 Willhire 24 Hour co-driving with Graham Hathaway and entered the Bathurst 1000 on four occasions with a best finish of eighth in 1989. He went on to win the 1990 British Touring Car Championship in a Ford Sierra RS500 built by his own Trakstar team and ran with no permanent major sponsorship until the later rounds.

== Trakstar Motorsport ==
Gravett co-founded Trakstar in 1989 with Mike Smith – Gravett finished second in his class that year, behind Andy Rouse's Ford Sierra RS500. In 1990, he won nine races in the sole Trakstar RS500 enjoying a fierce on-track rivalry with Rouse. There were two different classes of cars racing for the same title in 1990, each scoring points based on where they finished among their own class. Robb dominated his class and won the championship outright, the only driver to take the overall title in the Sierra RS500, despite operating on a shoestring budget. The key to Gravett's success was the Yokohama tyres that Trakstar used, which were more durable than the Dunlop rubber used by most of the field. During 1990, Gravett had a run in two races in the DTM championship, but did not score any points. Trakstar also built the Honda Civic run under the PG Tips Racing banner for Ray Armes that season.

The championship changed to a single-class in 1991, and Trakstar secured manufacturer support from Ford to run Sierra Sapphires that year with sponsorship from Shell Oil and engines prepared by Mountune, however Gravett was short on good results. Originally planned to be one of two cars run by the team, a second bodyshell was built but never completed. The Sierra Sapphire arrived late and had not turned a wheel before the first round at Silverstone. This led to a difficult development period and the team experimented with different engine and gearbox configurations and even four wheel drive in an effort to catch up. The car was down on power and difficult to set up. Results started to come towards the end of the year but it was too late. Despite being the works outfit, Ford was not investing in the team or the car's development costs. Unable to find a new title sponsor, the team struggled with lack of funds throughout the year and by the end of the season were forced into administration. Ford took a year out in 1992 before returning to the BTCC in 1993 with Andy Rouse.

== Later career ==
Gravett joined the factory Peugeot squad for 1992 and 1993. Peugeot had great success in European touring car racing, but never challenged in the BTCC, partly because of budgetary issues. The 405 needed a lot of development work, but Gravett pressed on, nearly winning the TOCA challenge at the end of 1992. He managed to finish second at Brands Hatch in 1993, matching Peugeot's best ever result in the BTCC. Steve Soper had made a forceful move on him on the last lap, but was given a penalty and placed in third. He didn't have a drive in 1994, and returned a year later as an independent driver.

Despite his success, the BTCC teams at the time were increasingly promoting international drivers and Gravett would not drive for a works team again. He turned his attention to running as a privateer, but was no less committed, including a then best 3rd overall finish at Snetterton for an independent. He went on to win the Total sponsored 1997 Independent BTCC Championship in a Graham Hathaway prepared Honda Accord. He drove for Brookes Motorsport in his final year of racing, finishing second in the Independents' Cup. He partnered Brookes at that year's Bathurst 1000, but failed to finish. Gravett was reported to be considering a comeback to the BTCC in 2014, but ultimately this came to nothing.

Gravett is now running a driver safety driving programme called "Ultimate Car Control UK Ltd" with the head office at Crowthorne in Berkshire and regional centres across the county. He is also a Director of Brand Synergy- a consortium hoping to save the British Grand Prix.

Gravett is now divorced. He has a son who has started a career in motorsport, running in the BARC Sax Max Championship.

== Racing record ==
=== Complete British Touring Car Championship results ===
(key) Races in bold indicate pole position (1 point awarded – 1996 onwards all races) Races in italics indicate fastest lap (1 point awarded – 1987–1989 in class) (* signifies that driver lead feature race for at least one lap – 1 point given in 1998 only)

Year	Team	Car	Class	1	2	3	4	5	6	7	8	9	10	11	12	13	14	15	16	17	18	19	20	21	22	23	24	25	26	Overall Pos	Pts	Class Pos
1987	Graham Hathaway Racing	Ford Sierra RS500	A	SIL	OUL	THR	THR	SIL	SIL; Ret	BRH	SNE	DON	OUL	DON	SIL															NC	0	NC
1988	ICS plc	Ford Sierra RS500	A	SIL	OUL	THR; Ret	DON ovr:10 cls:8	THR ovr:15 cls:11	SIL ovr:2 cls:2	SIL ovr:5 cls:5	BRH ovr:11 cls:8	SNE ovr:2 cls:2	BRH; Ret	BIR; C	DON	SIL														22nd	14	8th
1989	Trakstar Motorsport	Ford Sierra RS500	A	OUL ovr:1 cls:1	SIL ovr:2 cls:2	THR ovr:5 cls:5	**DON** ovr:2 cls:2	THR; Ret	SIL ovr:1 cls:1	SIL ovr:2 cls:2	**BRH** ovr:1 cls:1	**SNE** ovr:1 cls:1	BRH; Ret	**BIR** ovr:5 cls:5	**DON** ovr:2 cls:2	SIL ovr:3 cls:3														4th	74	**2nd**
1990	Trakstar Motorsport	Ford Sierra RS500	A	**OUL** ovr:12 cls:5	**DON** ovr:2 cls:2	**THR** ovr:1 cls:1	SIL ovr:1 cls:1	OUL ovr:1 cls:1	**SIL** ovr:1 cls:1	**BRH** ovr:1 cls:1	**SNE** ovr:1 cls:1	**BRH** ovr:1 cls:1	**BIR**; Ret	DON ovr:1 cls:1	**THR** ovr:3 cls:3	SIL ovr:1 cls:1														**1st**	**207**	**1st**
1991	Trakstar Motorsport	Ford Sierra Sapphire		SIL; 20	SNE; 13	DON; Ret	THR; 14	SIL; 18^{1}	BRH; 9	SIL; Ret	DON; 1; 9	DON; 2; 4	OUL; 9	BRH; 1; 5	BRH; 2; 2	DON; 7	THR; 9	SIL; 13												11th	28	
1992	Peugeot Talbot Sport	Peugeot 405 Mi16		SIL; 15	THR; Ret	OUL; Ret	SNE; Ret	BRH; 11	DON; 1; 10	DON; 2 Ret	SIL; 15	KNO; 1	KNO; 2	PEM; 10	BRH; 1; 12	BRH; 2 Ret	DON; 11	SIL; 16												24th	1	
1993	Peugeot Talbot Sport	Peugeot 405 Mi16		SIL; Ret	DON; Ret	SNE; 7	DON; 14	OUL; DNS	BRH; 1 DSQ	BRH; 2; 16	PEM; 11	SIL; 9	KNO; 1 Ret	KNO; 2 DNS	OUL; Ret	BRH; 2	THR; 4	DON; 1; 17	DON; 2; 13	SIL; DNS										13th	34	
1994	Team Mondeo	Ford Mondeo Ghia		THR	BRH; 1	BRH; 2	SNE	SIL; 1	SIL; 2	OUL	DON; 1	DON; 2	BRH; 1	BRH; 2	SIL	KNO; 1	KNO; 2	OUL	BRH; 1	BRH; 2	SIL; 1	SIL; 2	DON; 1; 11	DON; 2 Ret						NC	0	
1995	Roy Kennedy Racing	Vauxhall Cavalier 16v		DON; 1; 19	DON; 2; 15	BRH; 1	BRH; 2	THR; 1	THR; 2	SIL; 1	SIL; 2	OUL; 1	OUL; 2	BRH; 1	BRH; 2	DON; 1	DON; 2													20th	13	
1995	Foesport	Ford Mondeo Ghia																SIL; 13	KNO; 1; 10	KNO; 2; 14	BRH; 1; 19	BRH; 2; 13	SNE; 1; 3	SNE; 2 Ret	OUL; 1; 16	OUL; 2 DNS	SIL; 1; 15	SIL; 2 Ret		20th	13	
1996	Team Dynamics	Ford Mondeo Si		DON; 1; 12	DON; 2 Ret	BRH; 1 Ret	BRH; 2; 15	THR; 1; 13	THR; 2; 14	SIL; 1; 19	SIL; 2 Ret	OUL; 1; 16	OUL; 2; 15	SNE; 1	SNE; 2	BRH; 1	BRH; 2	SIL; 1 Ret	SIL; 2; 18	KNO; 1; 15	KNO; 2; 16	OUL; 1	OUL; 2	THR; 1	THR; 2	DON; 1	DON; 2	BRH; 1	BRH; 2	NC	0	
1997	Rock-It Cargo	Honda Accord		DON; 1	DON; 2	SIL; 1; 13	SIL; 2; 10	THR; 1; 16	THR; 2; 16	BRH; 1; 12	BRH; 2; 13	OUL; 1; 14	OUL; 2; 13	DON; 1; 17	DON; 2 Ret	CRO; 1; 15	CRO; 2; 14	KNO; 1; 13	KNO; 2; 10	SNE; 1; 14	SNE; 2; 13	THR; 1; 16	THR; 2 Ret	BRH; 1; 10	BRH; 2; 14	SIL; 1; 16	SIL; 2; 14			18th	3	
1998	Brookes Motorsport	Honda Accord		THR; 1; 17	THR; 2; 16	SIL; 1; 13	SIL; 2; 12*	DON; 1; 15	DON; 2 Ret	BRH; 1; 16	BRH; 2; 17	OUL; 1; 15	OUL; 2; 16	DON; 1; 8	DON; 2 Ret	CRO; 1 Ret	CRO; 2; 14	SNE; 1; 13	SNE; 2; 9	THR; 1; 16	THR; 2 Ret	KNO; 1 Ret	KNO; 2; 12	BRH; 1; 16	BRH; 2; 12*	OUL; 1; 15	OUL; 2; 12	SIL; 1 Ret	SIL; 2 DNS	19th	7	

1. – Race was stopped due to heavy rain. No points were awarded.

=== Complete European Touring Car Championship results ===
(key) (Races in bold indicate pole position) (Races in italics indicate fastest lap)

Year	Team	Car	1	2	3	4	5	6	7	8	9	10	11	DC	Pts
1988	(United Kingdom) Baynard Cars Ltd	Ford Sierra RS500	MNZ	DON	EST	JAR	DIJ	VAL	NÜR	SPA	ZOL	SIL; 9	NOG	NC	0

=== Complete Asia-Pacific Touring Car Championship results ===
(key) (Races in bold indicate pole position) (Races in italics indicate fastest lap)

Year	Team	Car	1	2	3	4	DC	Points
1988	(Australia) Shell Ultra Hi Racing	Ford Sierra RS500	BAT; Ret	WEL	PUK	FJI	NC	0

=== Complete Deutsche Tourenwagen Meisterschaft results ===
(key) (Races in bold indicate pole position) (Races in italics indicate fastest lap)

Year	Team	Car	1	2	3	4	5	6	7	8	9	10	11	12	13	14	15	16	17	18	19	20	21	22	Pos.	Pts
1990	AMG Motorenbau GmbH	Mercedes 190E 2.5-16 Evo2	ZOL; 1	ZOL; 2	HOC; 1	HOC; 2	NÜR; 1	NÜR; 2	AVU; 1	AVU; 2	MFA; 1	MFA; 2	WUN; 1	WUN; 2	NÜR; 1	NÜR; 2	NOR; 1	NOR; 2	DIE; 1	DIE; 2	NÜR; 1; 16	NÜR; 2; 17	HOC; 1	HOC; 2	NC	0

=== Complete Japanese Touring Car Championship results ===
(key) (Races in bold indicate pole position) (Races in italics indicate fastest lap)

Year	Team	Car	Class	1	2	3	4	5	6	DC	Pts
1990	Napolex Racing Team	Ford Sierra RS500	JTC-1	NIS	SUG	SUZ	TSU	SEN	FUJ; Ret	NC	0

=== Complete Bathurst 1000 results ===
Year	Car#	Team	Co-Driver	Car	Class	Laps	Pos.	Class Pos.
1988	18	(Australia) Shell Ultra Hi Racing	(Australia) John Bowe (New Zealand) Neville Crichton	Ford Sierra RS500	A	27	DNF	DNF
1989	18	(Australia) Shell Ultra Hi Racing	(United Kingdom) Jeff Allam	Ford Sierra RS500	A	158	8th	8th
1990	40	(New Zealand) Mark Petch Motorsport	(Italy) Gianfranco Brancatelli	Ford Sierra RS500	1	118	DNF	DNF
1998*	29	(United Kingdom) Brookes Motorsport	(United Kingdom) Lee Brookes	Honda Accord	ST	49	DNF	DNF

* Super Touring race

== Notes ==
Awards and achievements
Preceded by Allan McNish	Autosport; National Racing Driver of the Year; 1990	Succeeded by David Coulthard
Sporting positions
Preceded by John Cleland	British Touring Car Champion; 1990	Succeeded by Will Hoy
