= French Supertouring Championship =

Auto racing championship in France

The Championnat de France de Supertourisme (English: French Supertouring Championship) was a touring car racing championship organised by the Fédération Française du Sport Automobile between 1976 and 2005.

The championship was contested on several circuits around France, with points awarded for driver classification. The winning driver was the one with the most points at the end of the season.

A national title was given in 1974, but a proper touring car championship only started in 1976. The cars were run to Group 2 specification, and the championship was called the Championnat Français de Voiture de Tourisme (French Touring Car Championship). From 1982, Group A rules were adopted to replace the outgoing Group 2, but in 1983 the FFSA modified them to be loosely based on Group A, evolving into the 1987 and 1988 seasons, where Group B type machines, called "Superproduction," were allowed to run alongside Group A, dominating the series. The championship changed its name to Super Tourisme in 1989, when Group A cars were allowed technical evolutions to keep up with the faster Superproduction cars.

A major change happened in 1991, when the FFSA adopted a set of regulations similar to the British Touring Car Championship, with a maximum engine displacement of 2000 cm^{3}. In 1993, these regulations were formally codified by the FIA as Supertouring D2 Class. All works teams abandoned the championship at the end of 1995 but the series soldiered on with privateers. To make up the numbers, rally kitcars were allowed on the grid.

In 2001, Supertouring cars were replaced in the series by silhouette cars. Despite the change of class, the series retained its name. The final season was held in 2005, when because of rising costs the championship was cancelled. Since then, the most prestigious French circuit championship has been the FFSA GT Championship.

== Circuits (1976–2005) ==
- (France) Autodrome de Linas-Montlhéry (1976–1988, 1990–1996)
- (France) Circuit Bugatti (1976, 1978–1981, 1986, 1989–1994, 1998–2005)
- (France) Circuit d'Albi (1976–1979, 1981–1997, 1999–2005)
- (France) Circuit de Charade (1976, 1980–1986, 1990–1991, 1994–1996, 1998–1999)
- (France) Circuit de Croix-en-Ternois (1976, 1980–1995, 1997, 2001)
- (France) Circuit de Dijon-Prenois (1976–1987, 1989–1999, 2002–2005)
- (France) Circuit de Folembray (1977)
- (France) Circuit de la Châtre (1979–1981, 1983–1984, 1989)
- (France) Circuit de Lédenon (1977–1980, 1982–1991, 1994, 1996–2005)
- Circuit de Monaco (1987)
- (France) Circuit de Nevers Magny-Cours (1976–1987, 1989–1990, 1992–1994, 1997–2005)
- (France) Circuit de Pau-Ville (1977–1983, 1986, 1988, 1990–1991, 1993–2005)
- (France) Circuit de Rouen-Les-Essarts (1976–1978, 1980–1992)
- (Belgium) Circuit de Spa-Francorchamps (2000–2001)
- (France) Circuit du Val de Vienne (1992–2000, 2005)
- (France) Circuit Pau-Arnos (1987–1990)
- (France) Circuit Paul Armagnac (1976–2005)
- (France) Circuit Paul Ricard (1976–1980, 1982–1983, 1985–1989, 1993–1995, 1997–1998)
- (West Germany) Hockenheimring (1983)

== Champions ==
Year	Driver	Car
1974	(France) Jean-Claude Aubriet (Group 2)	BMW 3.0 CSL
1974	(France) Henri Greder (Group 1)	Opel Commodore GSE
1975	Not held	
1976	(France) Jean-Pierre Beltoise	BMW 3.0 CSi
1977	(France) Jean-Pierre Beltoise	BMW 530
1978	(France) Lucien Guitteny	Ford Capri 3.0 S
1979	(France) Dany Snobeck	Ford Capri 3.0 S
1980	(France) Dany Snobeck	Ford Escort RS 2000
1981	(France) Jean-Pierre Malcher	BMW 320i
1982	(France) René Metge	Rover 3500
1983	(France) Alain Cudini	Alfa Romeo GTV6
1984	(France) Dany Snobeck	Alfa Romeo GTV6
1985	(France) Jean-Louis Schlesser	Rover Vitesse
1986	(France) Xavier Lapeyre	Audi Quattro
1987	(France) Érik Comas (Superprod.)	Renault 5 Maxi Turbo
1987	(France) Fabien Giroix (Group A)	BMW M3
1988	(France) Jean Ragnotti (Superprod.)	Renault 21 Turbo
1988	(France) Jean-Pierre Malcher (Group A)	BMW M3
1989	(France) Jean-Pierre Malcher	BMW M3
1990	(France) Jean-Pierre Malcher	BMW M3
1991	(France) Xavier Lapeyre	Audi 80 quattro
1992	(France) Marc Sourd	Audi 80 quattro
1993	(Germany) Frank Biela	Audi 80 quattro
1994	(France) Laurent Aïello	Peugeot 405 Mi16
1995	(France) Yvan Muller	BMW 318i
1996	(France) Éric Cayrolle	BMW 320i
1997	(France) Éric Cayrolle	BMW 320i
1998	(France) Éric Cayrolle	BMW 320i
1999	(France) William David	Peugeot 406
2000	(France) William David	Peugeot 406
2001	(France) Jean-Philippe Dayraut	BMW M3 Silhouette
2002	(France) Soheil Ayari	Peugeot 406 Silhouette
2003	(France) Christophe Bouchut	SEAT Cordoba Silhouette
2004	(France) Soheil Ayari	Peugeot 406 Silhouette
2005	(France) Soheil Ayari	Peugeot 406 Silhouette
