= 1995 French Supertouring Championship =

Seasons
- ← 1994 1996 →

The 1995 French Supertouring Championship was won by Yvan Muller driving a BMW 318iS of Team BMW Fina.

== Teams and drivers ==
Team	Car	No.	Drivers	Round	Class
(France) Peugeot Esso	Peugeot 405	1	(France) Laurent Aïello	All	
(France) Peugeot Esso	Peugeot 405	2	(France) Philippe Alliot	All	
(France) Team BMW Fina	BMW 318i	3	(France) Yvan Muller	All	
Opel France	Opel Vectra	5	(France) Alain Cudini	All	
Opel France	Opel Vectra	6	(France) Éric Hélary	All	
(Italy) Alfa Corse	Alfa Romeo 155 TS	7	(France) Philippe Gache	1–4	
(France) Gérard Tremblay	BMW 318iS	8	(France) Gérard Tremblay	1–2, 4, 6	I
(France) Gérard Tremblay	BMW 318iS	8	(France) Jean-Pierre Large	1–2, 4	I
(France) Gérard Tremblay	BMW 318iS	8	(France) Willy Maljean	9	*
(France) SDA Sport	Peugeot 405	9	(France) William David	All	I
(France) Equipe Oreca	BMW 318iS	10	(France) Christophe Dechavanne	All	I
(France) Pérus Racing	Opel Astra GSi	11	(France) Maurice Pérus	1–5, 7–9	I
(France) Gérard Dillman	Opel Vectra	12	(France) Gérard Dillman	All	I
(France) Serge Masson	Peugeot 405	15	(France) Serge Masson	1–3, 6–9	I
(France) Serge Masson	Peugeot 405	15	(France) Alain Giradot	1–3, 6–9	I
(France) Equipe Bandura	Peugeot 405	16	(France) Daniel Bandura	1–2, 4–9	I
(France) Equipe Bandura	Peugeot 405	16	(France) Michel Bandura	1–2, 4–9	I
(France) Equipe Oreca	BMW 318iS	17	(Monaco) Stéphane Ortelli	2–9	I
(France) Basso Racing	BMW 318iS	21	(France) Jean-Claude Basso	2	I
Opel France	Opel Vectra	26	(France) Jacques Laffite	All	
(France) Pelras Competition	BMW 318iS	31	(France) Marcel Tarrès	3–9	I
(Italy) CiBiEmme Engineering	BMW 318iS	35	(Italy) Emanuele Naspetti	7	*

Icon	Class
*	Not eligible to score championship points
I	Independent Drivers

== Race calendar and results ==
Round		Circuit	Date	Pole position	Fastest lap	Winning driver	Winning team	Winning car
1	R1	Circuit de Nogaro	17 April	(France) Laurent Aïello	(France) Philippe Gache	(France) Laurent Aïello	Peugeot Talbot Sport	Peugeot 405
1	R2	Circuit de Nogaro	17 April		(France) Yvan Muller	(France) Yvan Muller	Team BMW Fina	BMW 318iS
2	R1	Dijon-Prenois	21 May	(France) Philippe Alliot	(France) Yvan Muller	(France) Yvan Muller	Team BMW Fina	BMW 318iS
2	R2	Dijon-Prenois	21 May	(France) Éric Hélary	(France) Yvan Muller	(France) Yvan Muller	Team BMW Fina	BMW 318iS
3	R1	Grand Prix de Pau	5 June	(France) Laurent Aïello	(France) Jacques Laffite	(France) Éric Hélary	Opel France	Opel Vectra
3	R2	Grand Prix de Pau	5 June	(France) Alain Cudini	(France) Alain Cudini	(France) Éric Hélary	Opel France	Opel Vectra
4	R1	Charade Circuit	11 June	(France) Laurent Aïello	(France) Éric Hélary	(France) Éric Hélary	Opel France	Opel Vectra
4	R2	Charade Circuit	11 June	(France) Éric Hélary	(France) Yvan Muller	(France) Yvan Muller	Team BMW Fina	BMW 318iS
5	R1	Circuit du Val de Vienne	25 June	(France) Yvan Muller	(France) Yvan Muller	(France) Yvan Muller	Team BMW Fina	BMW 318iS
5	R2	Circuit du Val de Vienne	25 June	(France) Yvan Muller	(France) Yvan Muller	(France) Yvan Muller	Team BMW Fina	BMW 318iS
6	R1	Circuit de Croix-en-Ternois	9 July	(France) Éric Hélary	(France) Yvan Muller	(France) Yvan Muller	Team BMW Fina	BMW 318iS
6	R2	Circuit de Croix-en-Ternois	9 July	(France) Éric Hélary	(France) Yvan Muller	(France) Éric Hélary	Opel France	Opel Vectra
7	R1	Circuit Paul Ricard	23 July	(France) Philippe Alliot	(Italy) Emanuele Naspetti	(France) Yvan Muller	Team BMW Fina	BMW 318iS
7	R2	Circuit Paul Ricard	23 July	(France) Laurent Aïello	(France) Yvan Muller	(France) Yvan Muller	Team BMW Fina	BMW 318iS
8	R1	Circuit d'Albi	3 September	(France) Alain Cudini	(France) Alain Cudini	(France) Éric Hélary	Opel France	Opel Vectra
8	R2	Circuit d'Albi	3 September	(France) Éric Hélary	(France) Éric Hélary	(France) Éric Hélary	Opel France	Opel Vectra
9	R1	Autodrome de Linas-Monthléry	1 October	(France) Alain Cudini	(France) Éric Hélary	(France) Jacques Laffite	Opel France	Opel Vectra
9	R2	Autodrome de Linas-Monthléry	1 October	(France) Alain Cudini	(France) Jacques Laffite	(France) Éric Hélary	Opel France	Opel Vectra

- 2 sessions, each qualifying session determines grid for each of two races (1st meeting only: grid of race 2 determined by race 1 result)

== Round 1 (France) Circuit de Nogaro ==
Qualifying

Pos	No	Driver	Car	Lap Time
1	1	(France) Laurent Aiello	Peugeot 405	1.33.58
2	5	(France) Alain Cudini	Opel Vectra GT	1.34.28
3	2	(France) Philippe Alliot	Peugeot 405	1.34.38
4	7	(France) Philippe Gache	Alfa Romeo 155	1.34.40
5	6	(France) Éric Hélary	Opel Vectra GT	1.34.45
6	26	(France) Jacques Laffite	Opel Vectra GT	1.35.51
7	9	(France) William David	Peugeot 405	1.35.58
8	10	(France) Christophe Dechavanne	BMW 318iS	1.36.82
9	12	(France) Gérard Dillman	Opel Vectra GT	1.37.73
10	15	(France) Alain Giradot	Peugeot 405	1.38.85
11	3	(France) Yvan Muller	BMW 318iS	1.39.93
12	11	(France) Maurice Pérus	Opel Astra GSi	1.40.32
13	8	(France) Jean-Pierre Large	BMW 318iS	1.44.00
14	16	(France) Daniel Bandura	Peugeot 405	1.44.63

Race 1

Pos	No	Driver	Constructor	Time/Retired	Points
1	1	(France) Laurent Aiello	Peugeot 405	19 laps in 30:37.01	10
2	5	(France) Alain Cudini	Opel Vectra GT	+0.31s	8
3	7	(France) Philippe Gache	Alfa Romeo 155	+0.74s	6
4	3	(France) Yvan Muller	BMW 318iS	+18.78s	5
5	6	(France) Éric Hélary	Opel Vectra GT	+20.35s	4
6	2	(France) Philippe Alliot	Peugeot 405	+23.14s	3
7	9	(France) William David	Peugeot 405	+38.46s	2
8	26	(France) Jacques Laffite	Opel Vectra GT	+45.08s	1
9	12	(France) Gérard Dillman	Opel Vectra GT	+46.61s	
10	10	(France) Christophe Dechavanne	BMW 318iS	+50.25s	
11	16	(France) Daniel Bandura	Peugeot 405	+1.03.29s	
12	11	(France) Maurice Pérus	Opel Astra GSi	+1 lap	
13	15	(France) Alain Giradot	Peugeot 405	+1 lap	
14	8	(France) Jean-Pierre Large	BMW 318iS	+2 laps	

Race 2

Pos	No	Driver	Constructor	Time/Retired	Points
1	3	(France) Yvan Muller	BMW 318iS	19 laps in 30:39.37	10
2	7	(France) Philippe Gache	Alfa Romeo 155	+1.31s	8
3	5	(France) Alain Cudini	Opel Vectra GT	+13.39s	6
4	9	(France) William David	Peugeot 405	+25.92s	5
5	12	(France) Gérard Dillman	Opel Vectra GT	+41.72s	4
6	26	(France) Jacques Laffite	Opel Vectra GT	+42.09s	3
7	10	(France) Christophe Dechavanne	BMW 318iS	+46.69s	2
8	16	(France) Michel Bandura	Peugeot 405	+1.29.38s	1
9	11	(France) Maurice Pérus	Opel Astra GSi	+1.36.70s	
10	8	(France) Gérard Tremblay	BMW 318iS	+2 laps	
11	15	(France) Serge Masson	Peugeot 405	+3 laps	
DNF	6	(France) Éric Hélary	Opel Vectra GT	+10 laps	
DNF	2	(France) Philippe Alliot	Peugeot 405	+18 laps	
DNS	1	(France) Laurent Aiello	Peugeot 405		

=== Championship standings after Round 1 ===
Drivers' Championship standings
Pos	Driver	Points
1	(France) Yvan Muller	15
2	(France) Alain Cudini	14
2	(France) Philippe Gache	14
4	(France) Laurent Aiello	10
5	(France) William David	7

== Round 2 (France) Dijon-Prenois ==
Qualifying Race 1
Pos	No	Driver	Car	Lap Time
1	2	(France) Philippe Alliot	Peugeot 405	1.23.10
2	6	(France) Éric Hélary	Opel Vectra GT	1.23.26
3	1	(France) Laurent Aiello	Peugeot 405	1.23.87
4	26	(France) Jacques Laffite	Opel Vectra GT	1.23.95
5	5	(France) Alain Cudini	Opel Vectra GT	1.24.10
6	3	(France) Yvan Muller	BMW 318iS	1.24.12
7	7	(France) Philippe Gache	Alfa Romeo 155	1.24.27
8	9	(France) William David	Peugeot 405	1.25.81
9	12	(France) Gérard Dillman	Opel Vectra GT	1.25.81
10	17	(France) Stéphane Ortelli	BMW 318iS	1.26.06
11	10	(France) Christophe Dechavanne	BMW 318iS	1.26.67
12	16	(France) Daniel Bandura	Peugeot 405	1.28.45
13	21	(France) Jean-Claude Basso	BMW 318iS	1.29.92
14	11	(France) Maurice Pérus	Opel Astra GSi	1.30.28
15	8	(France) Gérard Tremblay	BMW 318iS	1.33.25
16	15	(France) Serge Masson	Peugeot 405	no time

Qualifying Race 2

Pos	No	Driver	Car	Lap Time
1	6	(France) Éric Hélary	Opel Vectra GT	1.22.82
2	2	(France) Philippe Alliot	Peugeot 405	1.23.30
3	1	(France) Laurent Aiello	Peugeot 405	1.23.44
4	5	(France) Alain Cudini	Opel Vectra GT	1.23.54
5	26	(France) Jacques Laffite	Opel Vectra GT	1.24.01
6	3	(France) Yvan Muller	BMW 318iS	1.24.32
7	7	(France) Philippe Gache	Alfa Romeo 155	1.24.36
8	9	(France) William David	Peugeot 405	1.25.12
9	17	(France) Stéphane Ortelli	BMW 318iS	1.25.48
10	12	(France) Gérard Dillman	Opel Vectra GT	1.25.67
11	10	(France) Christophe Dechavanne	BMW 318iS	1.26.35
12	15	(France) Alain Giradot	Peugeot 405	1.28.85
13	16	(France) Michel Bandura	Peugeot 405	1.29.09
14	21	(France) Jean-Claude Basso	BMW 318iS	1.30.29
15	11	(France) Maurice Pérus	Opel Astra GSi	1.30.73
16	8	(France) Jean-Pierre Large	BMW 318iS	1.33.01

Race 1

Pos	No	Driver	Constructor	Time/Retired	Points
1	3	(France) Yvan Muller	BMW 318iS	20 laps in 28:46.68	10
2	6	(France) Éric Hélary	Opel Vectra GT	+0.69s	8
3	5	(France) Alain Cudini	Opel Vectra GT	+10.58s	6
4	1	(France) Laurent Aiello	Peugeot 405	+12.05s	5
5	2	(France) Philippe Alliot	Peugeot 405	+14.60s	4
6	7	(France) Philippe Gache	Alfa Romeo 155	+15.17s	3
7	26	(France) Jacques Laffite	Opel Vectra GT	+15.74s	2
8	12	(France) Gérard Dillman	Opel Vectra GT	+37.86s	1
9	17	(France) Stéphane Ortelli	BMW 318iS	+48.49s	
10	10	(France) Christophe Dechavanne	BMW 318iS	+52.49s	
11	16	(France) Daniel Bandura	Peugeot 405	+1.12.73s	
12	9	(France) William David	Peugeot 405	+1.47.36s	
13	15	(France) Serge Masson	Peugeot 405	+1 lap	
14	11	(France) Maurice Pérus	Opel Astra GSi	+1 lap	
15	21	(France) Jean-Claude Basso	BMW 318iS	+2 laps	
16	8	(France) Gérard Tremblay	BMW 318iS	+2 laps	

Race 2

Pos	No	Driver	Constructor	Time/Retired	Points
1	3	(France) Yvan Muller	BMW 318iS	20 laps in 28:47.74	10
2	6	(France) Éric Hélary	Opel Vectra GT	+1.03s	8
3	7	(France) Philippe Gache	Alfa Romeo 155	+2.73s	6
4	1	(France) Laurent Aiello	Peugeot 405	+8.13s	5
5	5	(France) Alain Cudini	Opel Vectra GT	+10.59s	4
6	2	(France) Philippe Alliot	Peugeot 405	+14.68s	3
7	26	(France) Jacques Laffite	Opel Vectra GT	+15.38s	2
8	17	(France) Stéphane Ortelli	BMW 318iS	+25.50s	1
9	12	(France) Gérard Dillman	Opel Vectra GT	+27.09s	
10	10	(France) Christophe Dechavanne	BMW 318iS	+47.35s	
11	15	(France) Alain Giradot	Peugeot 405	+1.15.66s	
12	16	(France) Michel Bandura	Peugeot 405	+1.16.00s	
13	9	(France) William David	Peugeot 405	+1.16.17s	
14	11	(France) Maurice Pérus	Opel Astra GSi	+1 lap	
DNF	8	(France) Jean-Pierre Large	BMW 318iS	+18 laps	
DNS	21	(France) Jean-Claude Basso	BMW 318iS		

=== Championship standings after Round 2 ===
Drivers' Championship standings

Pos	Driver	Points
1	(France) Yvan Muller	35
2	(France) Alain Cudini	24
3	(France) Philippe Gache	23
4	(France) Laurent Aiello	20
4	(France) Eric Helary	20

== Round 3 (France) Grand Prix de Pau ==
Qualifying Race 1

Pos	No	Driver	Car	Lap Time
1	1	(France) Laurent Aiello	Peugeot 405	1.22.72
2	26	(France) Jacques Laffite	Opel Vectra GT	1.22.91
3	6	(France) Éric Hélary	Opel Vectra GT	1.22.96
4	5	(France) Alain Cudini	Opel Vectra GT	1.23.01
5	3	(France) Yvan Muller	BMW 318iS	1.23.56
6	2	(France) Philippe Alliot	Peugeot 405	1.23.74
7	9	(France) William David	Peugeot 405	1.24.39
8	7	(France) Philippe Gache	Alfa Romeo 155	1.24.54
9	31	(France) Marcel Tarrès	BMW 318iS	1.25.81
10	12	(France) Gérard Dillman	Opel Vectra GT	1.25.93
11	17	(France) Stéphane Ortelli	BMW 318iS	1.26.04
12	10	(France) Christophe Dechavanne	BMW 318iS	1.27.10
13	15	(France) Alain Giradot	Peugeot 405	1.27.57
14	11	(France) Maurice Pérus	Opel Astra GSi	1.28.36

Qualifying Race 2

Pos	No	Driver	Car	Lap Time
1	5	(France) Alain Cudini	Opel Vectra GT	1.22.55
2	2	(France) Philippe Alliot	Peugeot 405	1.22.61
3	6	(France) Éric Hélary	Opel Vectra GT	1.22.84
4	3	(France) Yvan Muller	BMW 318iS	1.23.14
5	26	(France) Jacques Laffite	Opel Vectra GT	1.23.18
6	9	(France) William David	Peugeot 405	1.23.31
7	7	(France) Philippe Gache	Alfa Romeo 155	1.24.32
8	12	(France) Gérard Dillman	Opel Vectra GT	1.25.12
9	31	(France) Marcel Tarrès	BMW 318iS	1.25.12
10	17	(France) Stéphane Ortelli	BMW 318iS	1.25.31
11	10	(France) Christophe Dechavanne	BMW 318iS	1.26.65
12	11	(France) Maurice Pérus	Opel Astra GSi	1.28.08
13	15	(France) Serge Masson	Peugeot 405	1.28.17
14	1	(France) Laurent Aiello	Peugeot 405	no time

Race 1

Pos	No	Driver	Constructor	Time/Retired	Points
1	6	(France) Éric Hélary	Opel Vectra GT	20 laps in 28:31.64	10
2	3	(France) Yvan Muller	BMW 318iS	+2.66s	8
3	5	(France) Alain Cudini	Opel Vectra GT	+3.10s	6
4	1	(France) Laurent Aiello	Peugeot 405	+6.45s	5
5	2	(France) Philippe Alliot	Peugeot 405	+25.63s	4
6	26	(France) Jacques Laffite	Opel Vectra GT	+28.73s	3
7	31	(France) Marcel Tarrès	BMW 318iS	+40.56s	2
8	17	(France) Stéphane Ortelli	BMW 318iS	+41.46s	1
9	12	(France) Gérard Dillman	Opel Vectra GT	+41.71s	
10	9	(France) William David	Peugeot 405	+1.21.41s	
11	11	(France) Maurice Pérus	Opel Astra GSi	+1 lap	
DNF	15	(France) Alain Giradot	Peugeot 405	+10 laps	
DNF	10	(France) Christophe Dechavanne	BMW 318iS	+10 laps	
DNF	7	(France) Philippe Gache	Alfa Romeo 155	+11 laps	

Race 2

Pos	No	Driver	Constructor	Time/Retired	Points
1	6	(France) Éric Hélary	Opel Vectra GT	20 laps in 28:27.32	10
2	3	(France) Yvan Muller	BMW 318iS	+2.00s	8
3	26	(France) Jacques Laffite	Opel Vectra GT	+20.78s	6
4	9	(France) William David	Peugeot 405	+23.44s	5
5	5	(France) Alain Cudini	Opel Vectra GT	+23.75s	4
6	31	(France) Marcel Tarrès	BMW 318iS	+44.90s	3
7	11	(France) Maurice Pérus	Opel Astra GSi	+1.21.20s	2
8	12	(France) Gérard Dillman	Opel Vectra GT	+3.05.68s	1
9	10	(France) Christophe Dechavanne	BMW 318iS	+1 lap	
10	2	(France) Philippe Alliot	Peugeot 405	+1 lap	
11	1	(France) Laurent Aiello	Peugeot 405	+2 laps	
DNF	17	(France) Stéphane Ortelli	BMW 318iS	+16 laps	
DNS	7	(France) Philippe Gache	Alfa Romeo 155		
DNS	15	(France) Serge Masson	Peugeot 405		

=== Championship standings after Round 3 ===
Drivers' Championship standings

Pos	Driver	Points
1	(France) Yvan Muller	51
2	(France) Eric Helary	40
3	(France) Alain Cudini	34
4	(France) Laurent Aiello	25
5	(France) Philippe Gache	23

== Round 4 (France) Charade Circuit ==
Qualifying Race 1

Pos	No	Driver	Car	Lap Time
1	1	(France) Laurent Aiello	Peugeot 405	1.54.42
2	6	(France) Éric Hélary	Opel Vectra GT	1.54.44
3	2	(France) Philippe Alliot	Peugeot 405	1.54.51
4	5	(France) Alain Cudini	Opel Vectra GT	1.54.80
5	26	(France) Jacques Laffite	Opel Vectra GT	1.55.13
6	3	(France) Yvan Muller	BMW 318iS	1.55.14
7	7	(France) Philippe Gache	Alfa Romeo 155	1.55.35
8	17	(France) Stéphane Ortelli	BMW 318iS	1.57.45
9	31	(France) Marcel Tarres	BMW 318iS	1.58.07
10	12	(France) Gérard Dillman	Opel Vectra GT	1.58.23
11	10	(France) Christophe Dechavanne	BMW 318iS	1.59.49
12	16	(France) Daniel Bandura	Peugeot 405	2.02.19
13	11	(France) Maurice Pérus	Opel Astra GSi	2.03.44
14	8	(France) Jean-Pierre Large	BMW 318iS	2.05.53
15	9	(France) William David	Peugeot 405	time disallowed

Qualifying Race 2

Pos	No	Driver	Car	Lap Time
1	6	(France) Éric Hélary	Opel Vectra GT	1.54.06
2	1	(France) Laurent Aiello	Peugeot 405	1.55.12
3	2	(France) Philippe Alliot	Peugeot 405	1.55.28
4	3	(France) Yvan Muller	BMW 318iS	1.55.68
5	5	(France) Alain Cudini	Opel Vectra GT	1.55.70
6	7	(France) Philippe Gache	Alfa Romeo 155	1.55.97
7	9	(France) William David	Peugeot 405	1.56.26
8	26	(France) Jacques Laffite	Opel Vectra GT	1.57.25
9	17	(France) Stéphane Ortelli	BMW 318iS	1.57.58
10	31	(France) Marcel Tarres	BMW 318iS	1.58.45
11	12	(France) Gérard Dillman	Opel Vectra GT	1.58.67
12	10	(France) Christophe Dechavanne	BMW 318iS	2.00.38
13	16	(France) Michel Bandura	Peugeot 405	2.03.05
14	11	(France) Maurice Pérus	Opel Astra GSi	2.03.30
15	8	(France) Gérard Tremblay	BMW 318iS	2.06.94

Race 1

Pos	No	Driver	Constructor	Time/Retired	Points
1	6	(France) Éric Hélary	Opel Vectra GT	15 laps in 29:37.07	10
2	3	(France) Yvan Muller	BMW 318iS	+0.43s	8
3	5	(France) Alain Cudini	Opel Vectra GT	+12.44s	6
4	7	(France) Philippe Gache	Alfa Romeo 155	+17.63s	5
5	1	(France) Laurent Aiello	Peugeot 405	+19.81s	4
6	26	(France) Jacques Laffite	Opel Vectra GT	+21.99s	3
7	2	(France) Philippe Alliot	Peugeot 405	+23.03s	2
8	31	(France) Marcel Tarres	BMW 318iS	+40.25s	1
9	9	(France) William David	Peugeot 405	+43.59s	
10	12	(France) Gérard Dillman	Opel Vectra GT	+47.80s	
11	10	(France) Christophe Dechavanne	BMW 318iS	+48.64s	
12	16	(France) Daniel Bandura	Peugeot 405	+1.24.81s	
13	17	(France) Stéphane Ortelli	BMW 318iS	+1.54.65s	
14	11	(France) Maurice Pérus	Opel Astra GSi	+1.55.12s	
DNF	8	(France) Jean-Pierre Large	BMW 318iS	+3 laps	

Race 2

Pos	No	Driver	Constructor	Time/Retired	Points
1	3	(France) Yvan Muller	BMW 318iS	15 laps in 29:38.44	10
2	6	(France) Éric Hélary	Opel Vectra GT	+3.82s	8
3	1	(France) Laurent Aiello	Peugeot 405	+6.03s	6
4	5	(France) Alain Cudini	Opel Vectra GT	+6.52s	5
5	2	(France) Philippe Alliot	Peugeot 405	+18.98s	4
6	26	(France) Jacques Laffite	Opel Vectra GT	+19.78s	3
7	7	(France) Philippe Gache	Alfa Romeo 155	+24.98s	2
8	17	(France) Stéphane Ortelli	BMW 318iS	+26.11s	1
8	31	(France) Marcel Tarres	BMW 318iS	+44.03s	
10	12	(France) Gérard Dillman	Opel Vectra GT	+48.23s	
11	10	(France) Christophe Dechavanne	BMW 318iS	+57.32s	
12	9	(France) William David	Peugeot 405	+57.82s	
13	16	(France) Michel Bandura	Peugeot 405	+1.24.46s	
14	11	(France) Maurice Pérus	Opel Astra GSi	+1.53.33s	
15	8	(France) Gérard Tremblay	BMW 318iS	+1 lap	

=== Championship standings after Round 4 ===
Drivers' Championship standings

Pos	Driver	Points
1	(France) Yvan Muller	69
2	(France) Eric Helary	58
3	(France) Alain Cudini	45
4	(France) Laurent Aiello	35
5	(France) Philippe Gache	30

== Round 5 (France) Circuit du Val de Vienne ==
Qualifying Race 1

Pos	No	Driver	Car	Lap Time
1	3	(France) Yvan Muller	BMW 318iS	1.45.80
2	6	(France) Éric Hélary	Opel Vectra GT	1.46.11
3	1	(France) Laurent Aiello	Peugeot 405	1.46.21
4	5	(France) Alain Cudini	Opel Vectra GT	1.46.52
5	26	(France) Jacques Laffite	Opel Vectra GT	1.46.67
6	9	(France) William David	Peugeot 405	1.46.90
7	2	(France) Philippe Alliot	Peugeot 405	1.47.16
8	12	(France) Gérard Dillman	Opel Vectra GT	1.48.10
9	17	(France) Stéphane Ortelli	BMW 318iS	1.48.12
10	31	(France) Marcel Tarres	BMW 318iS	1.48.28
11	10	(France) Christophe Dechavanne	BMW 318iS	1.50.15
12	16	(France) Daniel Bandura	Peugeot 405	1.52.66
13	11	(France) Maurice Pérus	Opel Astra GSi	1.53.27

Qualifying Race 2

Pos	No	Driver	Car	Lap Time
1	3	(France) Yvan Muller	BMW 318iS	1.46.65
2	2	(France) Philippe Alliot	Peugeot 405	1.46.72
3	6	(France) Éric Hélary	Opel Vectra GT	1.46.76
4	1	(France) Laurent Aiello	Peugeot 405	1.46.91
5	26	(France) Jacques Laffite	Opel Vectra GT	1.47.28
6	5	(France) Alain Cudini	Opel Vectra GT	1.47.39
7	9	(France) William David	Peugeot 405	1.47.61
8	17	(France) Stéphane Ortelli	BMW 318iS	1.48.44
9	12	(France) Gérard Dillman	Opel Vectra GT	1.48.99
10	31	(France) Marcel Tarres	BMW 318iS	1.49.02
11	10	(France) Christophe Dechavanne	BMW 318iS	1.50.72
12	16	(France) Michel Bandura	Peugeot 405	1.53.15
13	11	(France) Maurice Pérus	Opel Astra GSi	1.54.57

Race 1

Pos	No	Driver	Constructor	Time/Retired	Points
1	3	(France) Yvan Muller	BMW 318iS	17 laps in 31:23.47	10
2	1	(France) Laurent Aiello	Peugeot 405	+3.07s	8
3	6	(France) Éric Hélary	Opel Vectra GT	+8.26s	6
4	5	(France) Alain Cudini	Opel Vectra GT	+8.55s	5
5	26	(France) Jacques Laffite	Opel Vectra GT	+14.61s	4
6	2	(France) Philippe Alliot	Peugeot 405	+19.33s	3
7	31	(France) Marcel Tarres	BMW 318iS	+19.71s	2
8	17	(France) Stéphane Ortelli	BMW 318iS	+20.22s	1
9	10	(France) Christophe Dechavanne	BMW 318iS	+39.85s	
10	12	(France) Gérard Dillman	Opel Vectra GT	+54.53s	
11	16	(France) Daniel Bandura	Peugeot 405	+1.11.72s	
12	11	(France) Maurice Pérus	Opel Astra GSi	+1.45.66s	
DNF	9	(France) William David	Peugeot 405	+13 laps	

Race 2

Pos	No	Driver	Constructor	Time/Retired	Points
1	3	(France) Yvan Muller	BMW 318iS	17 laps in 31:24.15	10
2	1	(France) Laurent Aiello	Peugeot 405	+4.82s	8
3	6	(France) Éric Hélary	Opel Vectra GT	+8.32s	6
4	17	(France) Stéphane Ortelli	BMW 318iS	+8.91s	5
5	2	(France) Philippe Alliot	Peugeot 405	+22.82s	4
6	31	(France) Marcel Tarres	BMW 318iS	+24.38s	3
7	10	(France) Christophe Dechavanne	BMW 318iS	+27.97s	2
8	9	(France) William David	Peugeot 405	+30.18s	1
9	12	(France) Gérard Dillman	Opel Vectra GT	+40.97s	
10	16	(France) Michel Bandura	Peugeot 405	+1.19.81s	
DNF	26	(France) Jacques Laffite	Opel Vectra GT	+9 laps	
DNF	11	(France) Maurice Pérus	Opel Astra GSi	+12 laps	
DNF	5	(France) Alain Cudini	Opel Vectra GT	+17 laps	

=== Championship standings after Round 5 ===
Drivers' Championship standings

Pos	Driver	Points
1	(France) Yvan Muller	89
2	(France) Eric Helary	70
3	(France) Laurent Aiello	51
4	(France) Alain Cudini	50
5	(France) Philippe Gache	30

== Round 6 (France) Circuit de Croix-en-Ternois ==
Qualifying Race 1

Pos	No	Driver	Car	Lap Time
1	6	(France) Éric Hélary	Opel Vectra GT	56.34
2	3	(France) Yvan Muller	BMW 318iS	56.77
3	1	(France) Laurent Aiello	Peugeot 405	56.81
4	5	(France) Alain Cudini	Opel Vectra GT	56.88
5	2	(France) Philippe Alliot	Peugeot 405	56.88
6	26	(France) Jacques Laffite	Opel Vectra GT	57.09
7	17	(France) Stéphane Ortelli	BMW 318iS	57.55
8	9	(France) William David	Peugeot 405	57.63
9	12	(France) Gérard Dillman	Opel Vectra GT	57.96
10	10	(France) Christophe Dechavanne	BMW 318iS	58.33
11	31	(France) Marcel Tarres	BMW 318iS	58.37
12	16	(France) Daniel Bandura	Peugeot 405	59.07
13	15	(France) Serge Masson	Peugeot 405	59.79
14	8	(France) Gérard Tremblay	BMW 318iS	1.04.93

Qualifying Race 2

Pos	No	Driver	Car	Lap Time
1	6	(France) Éric Hélary	Opel Vectra GT	56.33
2	3	(France) Yvan Muller	BMW 318iS	56.78
3	1	(France) Laurent Aiello	Peugeot 405	56.94
4	5	(France) Alain Cudini	Opel Vectra GT	56.94
5	2	(France) Philippe Alliot	Peugeot 405	57.01
6	26	(France) Jacques Laffite	Opel Vectra GT	57.10
7	17	(France) Stéphane Ortelli	BMW 318iS	57.41
8	9	(France) William David	Peugeot 405	57.71
9	10	(France) Christophe Dechavanne	BMW 318iS	58.11
10	12	(France) Gérard Dillman	Opel Vectra GT	58.18
11	31	(France) Marcel Tarres	BMW 318iS	58.49
12	15	(France) Alain Girardot	Peugeot 405	59.15
13	16	(France) Michel Bandura	Peugeot 405	59.56
14	8	(France) Gérard Tremblay	BMW 318iS	1.02.09

Race 1

Pos	No	Driver	Constructor	Time/Retired	Points
1	3	(France) Yvan Muller	BMW 318iS	32 laps in 31:27.79	10
2	6	(France) Éric Hélary	Opel Vectra GT	+7.23s	8
3	2	(France) Philippe Alliot	Peugeot 405	+11.95s	6
4	17	(France) Stéphane Ortelli	BMW 318iS	+17.26s	5
5	26	(France) Jacques Laffite	Opel Vectra GT	+22.53s	4
6	5	(France) Alain Cudini	Opel Vectra GT	+31.55s	3
7	10	(France) Christophe Dechavanne	BMW 318iS	+39.57s	2
8	9	(France) William David	Peugeot 405	+46.23s	1
9	16	(France) Daniel Bandura	Peugeot 405	+1 lap	
10	31	(France) Marcel Tarres	BMW 318iS	+1 lap	
DNF	12	(France) Gérard Dillman	Opel Vectra GT	+21 laps	
DNF	1	(France) Laurent Aiello	Peugeot 405	+31 laps	
DNF	12	(France) Gérard Dillman	Opel Vectra GT	+31 laps	
DNF	15	(France) Serge Masson	Peugeot 405	+31 laps	

Race 2

Pos	No	Driver	Constructor	Time/Retired	Points
1	6	(France) Éric Hélary	Opel Vectra GT	32 laps in 31:29.97	10
2	1	(France) Laurent Aiello	Peugeot 405	+9.30s	8
3	26	(France) Jacques Laffite	Opel Vectra GT	+19.73s	6
4	17	(France) Stéphane Ortelli	BMW 318iS	+20.24s	5
5	2	(France) Philippe Alliot	Peugeot 405	+28.59s	4
6	9	(France) William David	Peugeot 405	+30.57s	3
7	31	(France) Marcel Tarres	BMW 318iS	+31.00s	2
8	10	(France) Christophe Dechavanne	BMW 318iS	+35.56s	1
9	16	(France) Michel Bandura	Peugeot 405	+1 lap	
10	15	(France) Alain Girardot	Peugeot 405	+1 lap	
11	8	(France) Gérard Tremblay	BMW 318iS	+3 laps	
DNF	3	(France) Yvan Muller	BMW 318iS	+8 laps	
DNS	12	(France) Gérard Dillman	Opel Vectra GT		
DNS	5	(France) Alain Cudini	Opel Vectra GT		

=== Championship standings after Round 6 ===
Drivers' Championship standings

Pos	Driver	Points
1	(France) Yvan Muller	99
2	(France) Eric Helary	88
3	(France) Laurent Aiello	59
4	(France) Alain Cudini	53
5	(France) Philippe Alliot	38

== Round 7 (France) Circuit Paul Ricard ==
Qualifying Race 1

Pos	No	Driver	Car	Lap Time
1	2	(France) Philippe Alliot	Peugeot 405	1.28.62
2	3	(France) Yvan Muller	BMW 318iS	1.28.76
3	1	(France) Laurent Aiello	Peugeot 405	1.29.04
4	6	(France) Éric Hélary	Opel Vectra GT	1.29.06
5	5	(France) Alain Cudini	Opel Vectra GT	1.29.50
6	35	(Italy) Emanuele Naspetti	BMW 318iS	1.29.60
7	26	(France) Jacques Laffite	Opel Vectra GT	1.29.90
8	9	(France) William David	Peugeot 405	1.30.08
9	17	(France) Stéphane Ortelli	BMW 318iS	1.30.79
10	10	(France) Christophe Dechavanne	BMW 318iS	1.31.63
11	12	(France) Gérard Dillman	Opel Vectra GT	1.31.63
12	31	(France) Marcel Tarres	BMW 318iS	1.31.67
13	11	(France) Maurice Pérus	Opel Astra GSi	1.33.07
14	15	(France) Alain Giradot	Peugeot 405	1.33.46
15	16	(France) Daniel Bandura	Peugeot 405	1.35.62

Qualifying Race 2

Pos	No	Driver	Car	Lap Time
1	1	(France) Laurent Aiello	Peugeot 405	1.29.90
2	3	(France) Yvan Muller	BMW 318iS	1.29.91
3	2	(France) Philippe Alliot	Peugeot 405	1.30.47
4	5	(France) Alain Cudini	Opel Vectra GT	1.30.51
5	35	(Italy) Emanuele Naspetti	BMW 318iS	1.30.53
6	6	(France) Éric Hélary	Opel Vectra GT	1.30.82
7	26	(France) Jacques Laffite	Opel Vectra GT	1.31.44
8	17	(France) Stéphane Ortelli	BMW 318iS	1.31.63
9	9	(France) William David	Peugeot 405	1.31.84
10	12	(France) Gérard Dillman	Opel Vectra GT	1.32.47
11	31	(France) Marcel Tarres	BMW 318iS	1.32.76
12	10	(France) Christophe Dechavanne	BMW 318iS	1.33.50
13	15	(France) Serge Masson	Peugeot 405	1.35.53
14	16	(France) Michel Bandura	Peugeot 405	1.37.01

Race 1

Pos	No	Driver	Constructor	Time/Retired	Points
1	3	(France) Yvan Muller	BMW 318iS	20 laps in 30:31.02	10
2	35	(Italy) Emanuele Naspetti	BMW 318iS	+0.31s	
3	1	(France) Laurent Aiello	Peugeot 405	+6.28s	8
4	6	(France) Éric Hélary	Opel Vectra GT	+10.45s	6
5	5	(France) Alain Cudini	Opel Vectra GT	+10.79s	5
6	9	(France) William David	Peugeot 405	+18.76s	4
7	17	(France) Stéphane Ortelli	BMW 318iS	+32.80s	3
8	12	(France) Gérard Dillman	Opel Vectra GT	+33.40s	2
9	26	(France) Jacques Laffite	Opel Vectra GT	+36.16s	1
10	31	(France) Marcel Tarres	BMW 318iS	+45.10s	
11	10	(France) Christophe Dechavanne	BMW 318iS	+49.30s	2
12	15	(France) Alain Giradot	Peugeot 405	+1.25.85s	
13	16	(France) Daniel Bandura	Peugeot 405	+1.30.39s	
DNF	2	(France) Philippe Alliot	Peugeot 405	+20 laps	
DNS	13	(France) Maurice Pérus	Opel Astra Gsi		

Race 2

Pos	No	Driver	Constructor	Time/Retired	Points
1	3	(France) Yvan Muller	BMW 318iS	20 laps in 30:44.05	10
2	35	(Italy) Emanuele Naspetti	BMW 318iS	+1.36s	
3	5	(France) Alain Cudini	Opel Vectra GT	+4.83s	8
4	2	(France) Philippe Alliot	Peugeot 405	+6.83s	6
5	6	(France) Éric Hélary	Opel Vectra GT	+11.43s	5
6	1	(France) Laurent Aiello	Peugeot 405	+14.13s	4
7	9	(France) William David	Peugeot 405	+21.17s	3
8	17	(France) Stéphane Ortelli	BMW 318iS	+27.74s	2
9	15	(France) Serge Masson	Peugeot 405	+1.31.08s	1
10	10	(France) Christophe Dechavanne	BMW 318iS	+1.45.12s	
11	16	(France) Michel Bandura	Peugeot 405	+1 lap	
DNF	31	(France) Marcel Tarres	BMW 318iS	+5 laps	
DNF	12	(France) Gérard Dillman	Opel Vectra GT	+6 laps	
DNF	26	(France) Jacques Laffite	Opel Vectra GT	+15 laps	

=== Championship standings after Round 7 ===
Drivers' Championship standings

Pos	Driver	Points
1	(France) Yvan Muller	109
2	(France) Eric Helary	99
3	(France) Laurent Aiello	71
4	(France) Alain Cudini	66
5	(France) Philippe Alliot	44

== Round 8 (France) Circuit d'Albi ==
Qualifying Race 1

Pos	No	Driver	Car	Lap Time
1	5	(France) Alain Cudini	Opel Vectra GT	1.18.29
2	6	(France) Éric Hélary	Opel Vectra GT	1.18.63
3	1	(France) Laurent Aiello	Peugeot 405	1.18.83
4	9	(France) William David	Peugeot 405	1.19.25
5	26	(France) Jacques Laffite	Opel Vectra GT	1.19.33
6	3	(France) Yvan Muller	BMW 318iS	1.19.34
7	2	(France) Philippe Alliot	Peugeot 405	1.19.60
8	17	(France) Stéphane Ortelli	BMW 318iS	1.19.88
9	12	(France) Gérard Dillman	Opel Vectra GT	1.20.06
10	31	(France) Marcel Tarres	BMW 318iS	1.20.44
11	10	(France) Christophe Dechavanne	BMW 318iS	1.21.05
12	16	(France) Daniel Bandura	Peugeot 405	1.23.23
13	15	(France) Serge Masson	Peugeot 405	1.23.71
14	11	(France) Maurice Pérus	Opel Astra GSi	1.27.99

Qualifying Race 2

Pos	No	Driver	Car	Lap Time
1	6	(France) Éric Hélary	Opel Vectra GT	1.18.59
2	5	(France) Alain Cudini	Opel Vectra GT	1.18.82
3	1	(France) Laurent Aiello	Peugeot 405	1.19.30
4	9	(France) William David	Peugeot 405	1.19.62
5	3	(France) Yvan Muller	BMW 318iS	1.19.77
6	12	(France) Gérard Dillman	Opel Vectra GT	1.20.24
7	2	(France) Philippe Alliot	Peugeot 405	1.20.37
8	17	(France) Stéphane Ortelli	BMW 318iS	1.20.44
9	26	(France) Jacques Laffite	Opel Vectra GT	1.20.90
10	31	(France) Marcel Tarres	BMW 318iS	1.21.40
11	10	(France) Christophe Dechavanne	BMW 318iS	1.21.77
12	16	(France) Daniel Bandura	Peugeot 405	1.22.83
13	15	(France) Alain Giradot	Peugeot 405	1.23.56
14	11	(France) Maurice Pérus	Opel Astra GSi	no time

Race 1

Pos	No	Driver	Constructor	Time/Retired	Points
1	6	(France) Éric Hélary	Opel Vectra GT	21 laps in 28:19.27	10
2	26	(France) Jacques Laffite	Opel Vectra GT	+0.25s	8
3	3	(France) Yvan Muller	BMW 318iS	+5.90s	6
4	9	(France) William David	Peugeot 405	+7.66s	5
5	17	(France) Stéphane Ortelli	BMW 318iS	+23.67s	4
6	31	(France) Marcel Tarres	BMW 318iS	+31.15s	3
7	10	(France) Christophe Dechavanne	BMW 318iS	+39.98s	2
8	12	(France) Gérard Dillman	Opel Vectra GT	+1 lap	1
9	13	(France) Maurice Pérus	Opel Astra Gsi	+1 lap	
10	15	(France) Serge Masson	Peugeot 405	+2 laps	
DNF	5	(France) Alain Cudini	Opel Vectra GT	+5 laps	
DNF	1	(France) Laurent Aiello	Peugeot 405	+6 laps	
DNF	2	(France) Philippe Alliot	Peugeot 405	+6 laps	
DNF	16	(France) Daniel Bandura	Peugeot 405	+ 8 laps	

Race 2

Pos	No	Driver	Constructor	Time/Retired	Points
1	6	(France) Éric Hélary	Opel Vectra GT	21 laps in 28:14.43	10
2	26	(France) Jacques Laffite	Opel Vectra GT	+13.00s	8
3	3	(France) Yvan Muller	BMW 318iS	+14.28s	6
4	1	(France) Laurent Aiello	Peugeot 405	+15.33s	5
5	12	(France) Gérard Dillman	Opel Vectra GT	+18.28s	4
6	9	(France) William David	Peugeot 405	+18.84s	3
7	2	(France) Philippe Alliot	Peugeot 405	+29.96s	2
8	17	(France) Stéphane Ortelli	BMW 318iS	+31.31s	1
9	31	(France) Marcel Tarres	BMW 318iS	+40.43s	
10	10	(France) Christophe Dechavanne	BMW 318iS	+43.08s	
DNF	13	(France) Maurice Pérus	Opel Astra Gsi	+9 laps	
DNF	15	(France) Alain Giradot	Peugeot 405	+20 laps	
DNS	5	(France) Alain Cudini	Opel Vectra GT		
DNS	16	(France) Michel Bandura	Peugeot 405		

=== Championship standings after Round 8 ===
Drivers' Championship standings

Pos	Driver	Points
1	(France) Yvan Muller	121
2	(France) Eric Helary	119
3	(France) Laurent Aiello	76
4	(France) Alain Cudini	66
5	(France) Jacques Laffite	54

== Round 9 (France) Autodrome de Linas-Monthléry ==
Qualifying Race 1

Pos	No	Driver	Car	Lap Time
1	5	(France) Alain Cudini	Opel Vectra GT	1.24.13
2	6	(France) Éric Hélary	Opel Vectra GT	1.24.56
3	26	(France) Jacques Laffite	Opel Vectra GT	1.25.21
4	1	(France) Laurent Aiello	Peugeot 405	1.25.23
5	3	(France) Yvan Muller	BMW 318iS	1.25.85
6	12	(France) Gérard Dillman	Opel Vectra GT	1.26.36
7	17	(France) Stéphane Ortelli	BMW 318iS	1.26.64
8	31	(France) Marcel Tarres	BMW 318iS	1.26.86
9	10	(France) Christophe Dechavanne	BMW 318iS	1.28.15
10	16	(France) Daniel Bandura	Peugeot 405	1.28.78
11	15	(France) Alain Giradot	Peugeot 405	1.30.51
12	11	(France) Maurice Pérus	Opel Astra GSi	1.31.27
13	8	(France) Willy Maljean	BMW 318iS	1.38.42
14	2	(France) Philippe Alliot	Peugeot 405	no time
15	9	(France) William David	Peugeot 405	no time

Qualifying Race 2

Pos	No	Driver	Car	Lap Time
1	5	(France) Alain Cudini	Opel Vectra GT	1.24.21
2	6	(France) Éric Hélary	Opel Vectra GT	1.24.92
3	1	(France) Laurent Aiello	Peugeot 405	1.25.23
4	26	(France) Jacques Laffite	Opel Vectra GT	1.25.29
5	2	(France) Philippe Alliot	Peugeot 405	1.25.86
6	3	(France) Yvan Muller	BMW 318iS	1.26.08
7	12	(France) Gérard Dillman	Opel Vectra GT	1.26.62
8	9	(France) William David	Peugeot 405	1.26.76
9	17	(France) Stéphane Ortelli	BMW 318iS	1.26.89
10	31	(France) Marcel Tarres	BMW 318iS	1.27.58
11	10	(France) Christophe Dechavanne	BMW 318iS	1.28.79
12	16	(France) Michel Bandura	Peugeot 405	1.30.52
13	11	(France) Maurice Pérus	Opel Astra GSi	1.30.87
14	15	(France) Serge Masson	Peugeot 405	1.31.39

Race 1

Pos	No	Driver	Constructor	Time/Retired	Points
1	26	(France) Jacques Laffite	Opel Vectra GT	20 laps in 29:10.17	10
2	6	(France) Éric Hélary	Opel Vectra GT	+1.04s	8
3	1	(France) Laurent Aiello	Peugeot 405	+8.10s	6
4	9	(France) William David	Peugeot 405	+39.19s	5
5	3	(France) Yvan Muller	BMW 318iS	+39.60s	4
6	2	(France) Philippe Alliot	Peugeot 405	+41.12s	3
7	17	(France) Stéphane Ortelli	BMW 318iS	+53.63s	2
8	31	(France) Marcel Tarres	BMW 318iS	+56.94s	3
9	16	(France) Daniel Bandura	Peugeot 405	+1 lap	
10	13	(France) Maurice Pérus	Opel Astra Gsi	+1 lap	
DNF	10	(France) Christophe Dechavanne	BMW 318iS	+5 laps	
DNF	12	(France) Gérard Dillman	Opel Vectra GT	+6 laps	
DNF	5	(France) Alain Cudini	Opel Vectra GT	+11 laps	
DNF	15	(France) Alain Giradot	Peugeot 405	+17 laps	
DNS	8	(France) Willy Maljean	BMW 318iS		

Race 2

Pos	No	Driver	Constructor	Time/Retired	Points
1	6	(France) Éric Hélary	Opel Vectra GT	20 laps in 28:58.82	10
2	26	(France) Jacques Laffite	Opel Vectra GT	+1.65s	8
3	1	(France) Laurent Aiello	Peugeot 405	+2.90s	6
4	2	(France) Philippe Alliot	Peugeot 405	+29.82s	5
5	3	(France) Yvan Muller	BMW 318iS	+31.71s	4
6	9	(France) William David	Peugeot 405	+32.09s	3
7	31	(France) Marcel Tarres	BMW 318iS	+1.00.76s	2
8	12	(France) Gérard Dillman	Opel Vectra GT	+1.04.06s	1
9	10	(France) Christophe Dechavanne	BMW 318iS	+1.21.01s	
10	15	(France) Serge Masson	Peugeot 405	+1 lap	
11	13	(France) Maurice Pérus	Opel Astra Gsi	+1 lap	
DNF	16	(France) Michel Bandura	Peugeot 405	+5 laps	
DNF	17	(France) Stéphane Ortelli	BMW 318iS	+19 laps	
DNS	5	(France) Alain Cudini	Opel Vectra GT		

=== Championship standings after Round 9 ===
Drivers' Championship standings

Pos	Driver	Points
1	(France) Yvan Muller	131 (139)
2	(France) Eric Helary	128 (137)
3	(France) Laurent Aiello	88
4	(France) Jacques Laffite	71 (72)
5	(France) Alain Cudini	66

== Championship standings ==
Points system
1st	2nd	3rd	4th	5th	6th	7th	8th
10	8	6	5	4	6	2	1

- 15 results from 18 are valid for the championship

=== Drivers' Championship ===
Pos	Driver	Car	NOG (France)		DIJ (France)		PAU (France)		CHA (France)		VAL (France)		CRO (France)		LEC (France)		ALB (France)		LIN (France)		Pts
1	(France) Yvan Muller	BMW	4	1	1	1	2	2	2	1	1	1	1	Ret	1	1	3	3	(5)	(5)	131 (139)
2	(France) Éric Hélary	Opel	(5)	Ret	2	2	1	1	1	2	3	3	2	1	3	(4)	1	1	2	1	128 (137)
3	(France) Laurent Aïello	Peugeot	1	Ret	4	4	4	Ret	5	3	2	2	Ret	2	2	5	Ret	4	3	3	88
4	(France) Jacques Laffite	Opel	(8)	6	7	7	6	3	6	6	5	Ret	5	3	8	Ret	2	2	1	2	71 (72)
5	(France) Alain Cudini	Opel	2	3	3	5	3	5	3	4	4	Ret	6	DNS	4	2	Ret	Ret	Ret	DNS	66
6	(France) Philippe Alliot	Peugeot	6	Ret	5	6	5	10	7	5	6	5	3	5	Ret	3	Ret	7	6	4	53
7	(France) William David	Peugeot	7	4	12	13	10	4	9	12	Ret	8	8	6	5	6	4	6	4	6	40
8	(Monaco) Stéphane Ortelli	BMW			9	8	8	Ret	13	8	8	4	4	4	7	8	5	8	7	Ret	31
9	(France) Philippe Gache	Alfa	3	2	6	3	Ret	Ret	4	7											30
10	(France) Marcel Tarrès	BMW					11	7	8	9	7	6	10	7	9	Ret	6	9	8	7	19
11	(France) Gérard Dillmann	Opel	9	5	8	9	9	8	10	10	10	9	Ret	DNS	7	Ret	8	5	Ret	8	14
12	(France) Christophe Dechavanne	BMW	10	7	10	10	Ret	9	11	11	9	7	7	8	10	9	7	10	Ret	9	9
13	(France) Maurice Pérus	Opel	12	9	14	14	11	7	14	14	12	Ret			DNS	DNS	9	Ret	10	11	2
14	(France) Michel Bandura	Peugeot		8		12				13		10		9		11		Ret		Ret	1
14	(France) Serge Masson	Peugeot		11	13			Ret					Ret			9	10			10	1

=== Manufacturers' Trophy ===
Pos	Manufacturer	Pts
1	(Germany) Opel	298
2	(Germany) BMW	285
3	(France) Peugeot	218
4	(Italy) Alfa Romeo	59

=== Independents' Trophy ===
Pos	Driver	Pts
1	(Monaco) Stephane Ortelli	72
2	(France) William David	71
3	(France) Gerard Dillmann	57
4	(France) Marcel Tarres	55
5	(France) Christophe Dechavanne	46
6	(France) Daniel Bandura	31
7	(France) Michel Bandura	25
8	(France) Maurice Perus	24
9	(France) Alain Giradot	21
10	(France) Serge Masson	18

== Sources ==
- Touring Car World 95/96 — The official book of Touring car
- "1995 Championnat de France de Supertourisme". Super Touring Register.
- Championship points standings for the Championnat de France Supertourism 1995. "Championnat de France Supertourism 1995 standings". Driver Database.
