= 1996 French Supertouring Championship =

Seasons
- ← 1995 1997 →

The 1996 French Supertouring Championship was won by Eric Cayrolle driving a BMW 318iS of Eric Cayrolle Team.

== Teams and drivers ==
Team	Car	No.	Drivers	Round	Class
(France) Team Snobeck	Opel Vectra	3	(France) Gérard Dillman	1–2	I
(France) Eric Cayrolle	BMW 318i	4	(France) Eric Cayrolle	2–8	I
(France) Pérus Racing	Opel Vectra	8	(France) Maurice Pérus	All	I
(France) Alexandre Pouchelon	Peugeot 405	9	(France) Alexandre Pouchelon	1–2, 5–7	I
(France) Bruno Hernandez	Peugeot 405	9	(France) Bruno Hernandez	4	I
(France) Gilles Chatelain	Peugeot 405	9	(France) Gilles Chatelain	8	I
(France) Basso Racing	BMW 318iS	10	(France) Jean-Claude Basso	1, 4	I
(Belgium) Ecurie Bruxelloise	BMW 318iS	11	(Belgium) Robert Dierick	2	*
(France) Equipe Oreca	BMW 318iS	12	(France) Patrick Herbert	1–2, 4–8	I
(France) Equipe Bandura	Peugeot 405	16	(France) Daniel Bandura	1–2, 4–8	I
(France) Equipe Bandura	Peugeot 405	16	(France) Michel Bandura	1–2, 4–8	I
(France) Jean Christian Buisson	Citroën ZX	19	(France) Yvan Lebon	5–6	I
(France) Jean Christian Buisson	Citroën ZX	19	(France) Dominique Bellugeon	6	I
(Belgium) Ecurie Bruxelloise	Volkswagen Golf Gti	33	(Belgium) Bernard Winderickx	2	*
(France) Bruno Hernandez	BMW M3	6	(France) Bruno Hernandez	5–8	C
(France) Bruno Hernandez	Peugeot 306	7	(France) Bruno Hernandez	1–3	C
(France) Gilles Chatelain	Peugeot 306	7	(France) Gilles Chatelain	4	C
(France) Roger Plichet	Renault Laguna	14	(France) Roger Plichet	3–5, 8	C
(France) Alain Delaporte	BMW M3	15	(France) Alain Delaporte	3–8	C
(France) Franck Matifas	Alfa Romeo 145	17	(France) Franck Matifas	1	C
(France) Etienne Casubolo	BMW M3	17	(France) Etienne Casubolo	3–4, 6–8	C
(France) Denis Rousseau	Alfa Romeo 145	18	(France) Denis Rousseau	1	C
(France) Jean-Pierre Lacoste	Mercedes 190E	18	(France) Jean-Pierre Lacoste	3, 6–8	C
(France) Serge Vendramini	Alfa Romeo 145	19	(France) Serge Vendramini	1	C
(France) Franck Guibbert	Alfa Romeo 145	20	(France) Franck Guibbert	1	C
(France) Thierry Guyard	Volkswagen Scirocco	21	(France) Thierry Guyard	2	C
(France) Maurice Roger	Alfa Romeo 145	27	(France) Maurice Roger	1	C

Icon	Class
*	Not eligible to score championship points
I	Independent Drivers
C	Criterium Class

== Race calendar and results ==
Round		Circuit	Date	Pole position	Winning driver	Winning team	Winning car
1	R1	Circuit de Nogaro	8 April	(France) Gérard Dillman	(France) Gérard Dillman	Team Snobeck	Opel Vectra
1	R2	Circuit de Nogaro	8 April	(France) Gérard Dillman	(France) Gérard Dillman	Team Snobeck	Opel Vectra
2	R1	Circuit de Lédenon	21 April	(France) Gérard Dillman	(France) Gérard Dillman	Team Snobeck	Opel Vectra
2	R2	Circuit de Lédenon	21 April	(France) Gérard Dillman	(France) Gérard Dillman	Team Snobeck	Opel Vectra
3	R1	Grand Prix de Pau	26 May	(France) Eric Cayrolle	(France) Eric Cayrolle	Eric Cayrolle	BMW 318iS
4	R1	Dijon-Prenois	9 June	(France) Eric Cayrolle	(France) Eric Cayrolle	Eric Cayrolle	BMW 318iS
4	R2	Dijon-Prenois	9 June	(France) Eric Cayrolle	(France) Eric Cayrolle	Eric Cayrolle	BMW 318iS
5	R1	Circuit du Val de Vienne	23 June	(France) Patrick Herbert	(France) Eric Cayrolle	Eric Cayrolle	BMW 318iS
5	R2	Circuit du Val de Vienne	23 June	(France) Eric Cayrolle	(France) Eric Cayrolle	Eric Cayrolle	BMW 318iS
6	R1	Charade Circuit	7 July	(France) Maurice Pérus	(France) Eric Cayrolle	Eric Cayrolle	BMW 318iS
6	R2	Charade Circuit	7 July	(France) Eric Cayrolle	(France) Eric Cayrolle	Eric Cayrolle	BMW 318iS
7	R1	Circuit d'Albi	1 September	(France) Eric Cayrolle	(France) Maurice Pérus	Pérus Racing	Opel Vectra
7	R2	Circuit d'Albi	1 September	(France) Maurice Pérus	(France) Maurice Pérus	Pérus Racing	Opel Vectra
8	R1	Autodrome de Linas-Monthléry	29 September	(France) Patrick Herbert	(France) Eric Cayrolle	Eric Cayrolle	BMW 318iS
8	R2	Autodrome de Linas-Monthléry	29 September	(France) Patrick Herbert	(France) Eric Cayrolle	Eric Cayrolle	BMW 318iS

== Championship standings ==
Points system
1st	2nd	3rd	4th	5th	6th	7th	8th
10	8	6	5	4	6	2	1

=== Drivers' Championship ===
Pos	Driver	Car	NOG (France)		LED (France)		PAU (France)	DIJ (France)		VAL (France)		CHA (France)		ALB (France)		LIN (France)		Pts
1	(France) Eric Cayrolle	BMW			2	3	1	1	1	1	1	1	1	3	3	1	1	116
2	(France) Maurice Pérus	Opel	2	2	3	DNS	2	6	DNS	3	2	Ret	DNS	1	1	3	3	79
3	(France) Patrick Herbert	BMW	3	3	DNS	2		2	2	2	5	Ret	DNS	5	4	2	2	73
4	(France) Gérard Dillman	Opel	1	1	1	1												40
5	(France) Michel Bandura	Peugeot		4		4			4		4		2		5		4	37
6	(France) Alexandre Pouchelon	Peugeot	DNS		4	5				6			4	2	2			33
7	(France) Daniel Bandura	Peugeot	4		DNS			4		4		2		4		4		33
8	(Monaco) Yvan Lebon	Citroen								5	3	3						16
9	(France) Jean Claude Basso	BMW	3	2	6	3	Ret	Ret	4	7								16
10	(France) Bruno Hernandez	Peugeot						3	3									12
11	(France) Gilles Chatelain	Peugeot														5	5	8
12	(France) Dominique Bellugeon	Citroen											3					6

=== Criterium' Trophy ===
Pos	Driver	Points
1	Bruno Hernandez	57
2	Etienne Casubolo	50
3	Alain Delaporte	39
4	Jean-Pierre Lacoste	23
5	Roger Plichet	22
6	Gilles Chatelain	18
7	Jean-Christian Buisson	15
8	Thierry Guyard	14

== Sources ==
- Touring Car World 96/97 — The official book of Touring car
- "1996 Championnat de France de Supertourisme". Super Touring Register.
- Championship points standings for the Championnat de France Supertourism 1996. "Championnat de France Supertourism 1996 standings". Driver Database.
