= Yvan Muller =

French racing driver (born 1969)

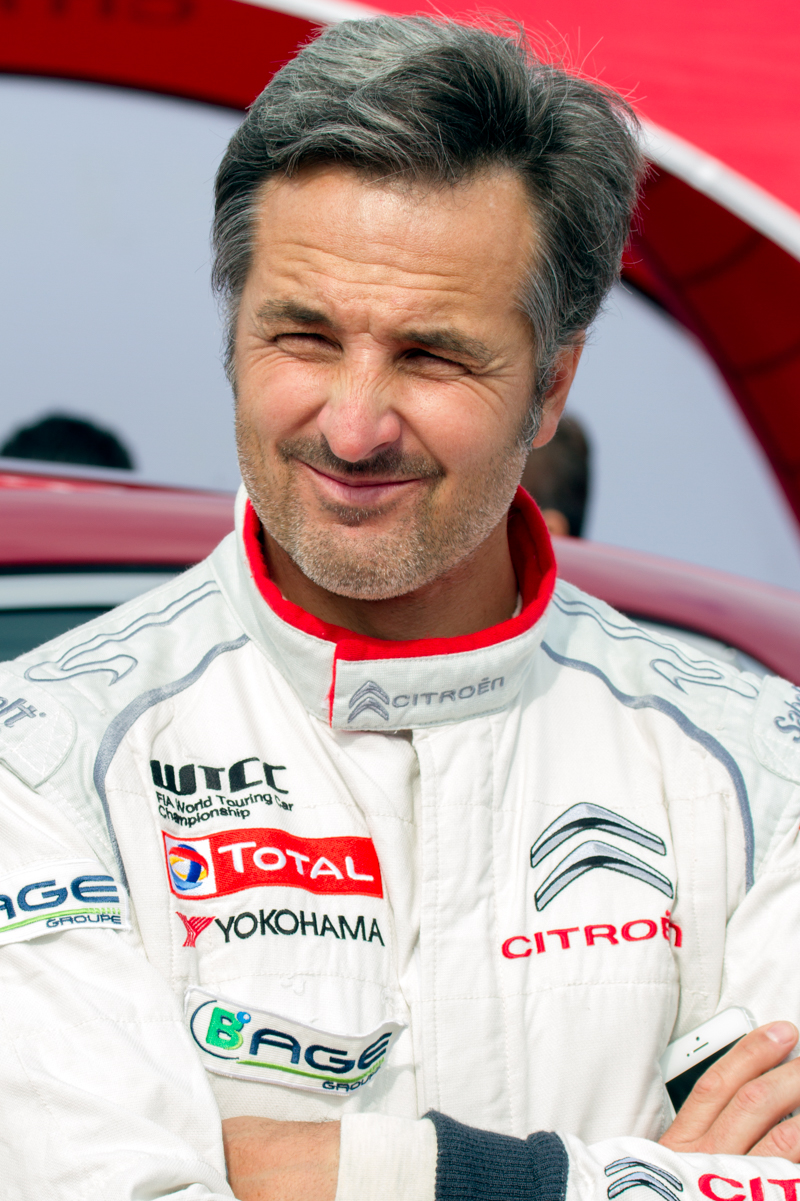
- Muller at the 2014 FIA WTCC Race of Japan
- Nationality: (France) French
- Born: Yvan Charles Müller; 16 August 1969 (age 57) Altkirch, France
- Relatives: Cathy Muller (sister); Yann Ehrlacher (nephew); Yves Ehrlacher (brother-in-law)

World Touring Car Championship and World Touring Car Cup career
- Debut season: 2006
- Car number: 48
- Former teams: SEAT Sport, Chevrolet, RML, Citroën Racing, Polestar Cyan Racing
- Starts: 328
- Wins: 56
- Poles: 33
- Fastest laps: 40
- Best finish: 1st in 2008, 10–11, 13

Previous series
- 2010, 2012 2010–11 2006-17 2003 2001 2000–05 1998–2005 1997 1996 1995 1994 1993 1992 1989–91 1988: V8 Supercars; World Rally Championship; WTCC; ETCC; ESTC; V8 Supercars; BTCC; STW; Italian Superturismo; French Supertouring; French Supertouring; International F3000; British F2; French F3; French Formula Renault

Championship titles
- 2013 2011 2010 2008 2003 1995 1992: WTCC; WTCC; WTCC; WTCC; BTCC; French Supertouring; British F2

Yvan Charles Muller (born 16 August 1969) is a French auto racing driver most noted for success in touring car racing. He is a four-time World Touring Car Champion, winning the title in 2008 with SEAT, in 2010 and 2011 with Chevrolet and in 2013 with RML. He was the British Touring Car Champion in 2003 with Vauxhall.

== Racing career ==
=== Single-seaters ===
After competing in French Formula Renault and French Formula Three, Muller won the British Formula Two championship title in 1992 and competed in the FIA Formula 3000 Championship in 1993. His sister Cathy Muller had previously contested four races in this category between 1986 and 1988.

=== French Supertouring Championship, Italian Superturismo and Super Tourenwagen Cup ===
In 1994, Muller made his debut in French Supertouring Championship with Team BMW Fina finishing third while the following year he became Champion. In 1996, due to lack of manufacturers involved, he decided to pass to Audi Sport Italia and to compete in Italian Superturismo Championship finishing fourth overall. After one season, he moved to STW in order to develop the new Audi A4 front wheel. He ended seventh, and in 1998, he passed to BTCC.

Three years later, Muller was called by N.Technology to run with Alfa Romeo 156 to help Alfa Romeo and Giovanardi to win the European Super Touring Championship 2001.

=== British Touring Car championship ===
Muller started his BTCC career in 1998 replacing Audi Vice Champion Frank Biela that in the while came back in STW. Muller, thanks to his major experience with front wheel Audi A4, got three podiums and finished seventh in the 1998 championship while his teammate John Bintcliffe finished just 15th. After Audi withdraw at the end of 1998 BTCC, Muller moved to the Vauxhall Motorsport team run by Triple Eight Race Engineering for 1999 alongside John Cleland using the Vauxhall Vectra. He would win his first BTCC race at round 7 Brands Hatch, he would eventually finish sixth in the championship while teammate John Cleland finished 13th. 2000 was the last year for the Super Tourers in the BTCC. Muller drove for Vauxhall again while Jason Plato and Vincent Radermecker joined after leaving Renault and Volvo who pulled out at the end of 1999. Muller finished as the top driver for Vauxhall in fourth in the championship behind all three Ford drivers (Alain Menu, Anthony Reid and Rickard Rydell).

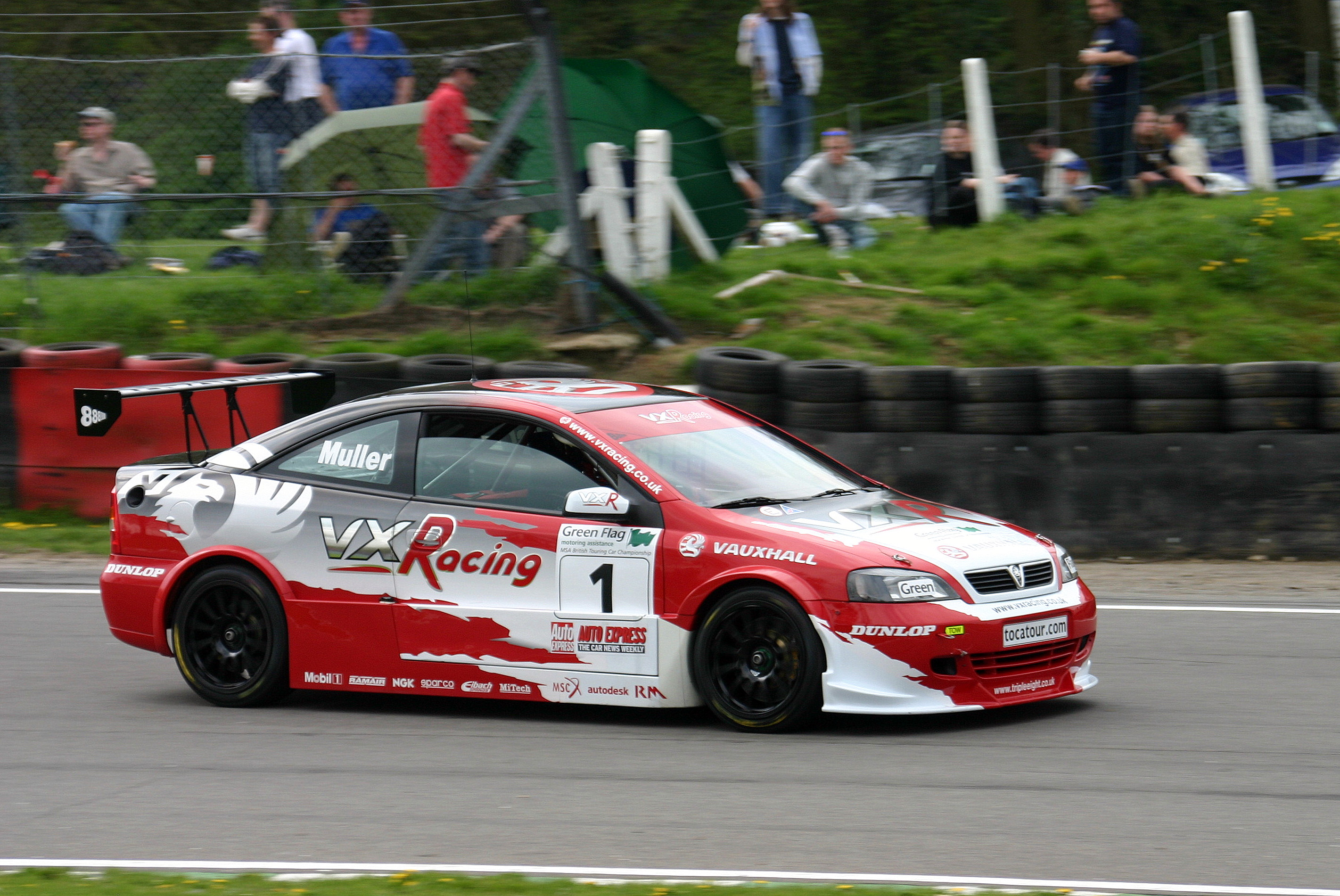
Muller driving for Vauxhall at Brands Hatch during the 2004 British Touring Car Championship season.

In 2001, the regulations changed to the new Touring Cars. Vauxhall debuted its BTC-T Vauxhall Astra Coupe for both the Vauxhall Motorsport team and Egg Sport both run by Triple Eight Race Engineering. The Astra was the car to beat against its competitors. Muller and teammate Plato fought for the championship the whole season. Muller finished second in the championship after his car caught fire in the final race leaving Plato as the champion. 2002 BTCC would be much of the same. The Astra was the best car against Honda, Peugeot, MG and Proton despite some reliability problems throughout the season. James Thompson moved up to Vauxhall Motorsport after 2001 champion Jason Plato left to drive in ASCAR. Muller finished second in the championship again behind teammate Thompson after more bad luck during the season and last few races caused him to again miss out on the title. He would again drive in 2003 for Vauxhall. The team, now called VX Racing, continued racing the Astra Coupe and also streached to a three car works Vauxhall/VXR team after Egg Sport was dropped. The Astra Coupe was again the car to beat and Muller and Thompson again fought for the championship. Muller won his first title from teammate Thompson after a very strong season. 2004 would be the last year for the Astra Coupe. The Astra was challenged very hard in 2004 by Honda, MG and Seat making its debut with former Vauxhall driver and 2001 champion Jason Plato, but consistency lead both the VX Racing teammates of Muller and Thompson to fight for the championship. Thompson won his second championship from Muller by one point. 2005 saw the new BTC-T Vauxhall Astra Sport Hatch replace the extremely successful Astra Coupe for Vauxhall. The Astra Sport Hatch was out classed by the new Honda Integra and prevented Muller from winning a second title. He finished second in the championship for the fourth time in five years, making a decision at the end of 2005, Muller left the BTCC to drive for Seat in the WTCC.

=== V8 Supercar ===
Muller competed in the two Australian V8 Supercar endurance races each year for a number of years, taking victory at the 2005 Sandown 500 with local driver Craig Lowndes in their Betta Electrical Triple Eight BA Falcon. In the same year, he was also involved in one of the most memorable incidents at the Mount Panorama for the Bathurst 1000, where in the lead, Craig Lowndes clipped the wall at Reid Park, and after a watts link change, another incident saw a wheel part company from Paul Dumbrell's car and hit the windscreen of Lowndes. In 2006 and 2007, Muller has been unable to race in the two annual enduros due to a clash with WTCC.

=== World Touring Car championship ===
==== SEAT (2006–2009) ====
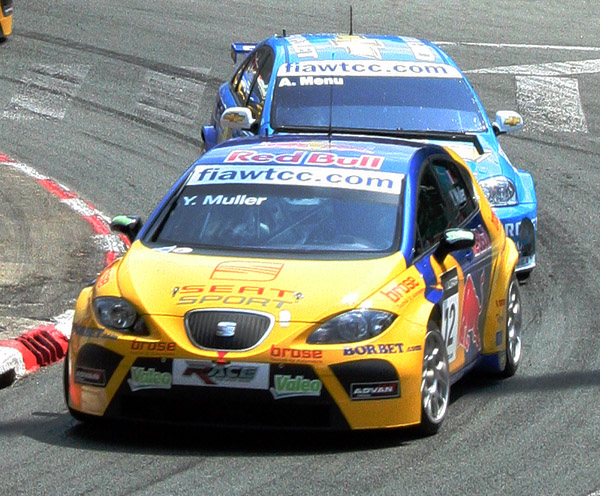
Yvan Muller driving the SEAT León at the Pau Grand Prix in 2007

On 12 November 2005 it was officially announced that Muller would be switching to the 2006 World Touring Car Championship (WTCC), driving for SEAT Sport. A pair of second places in the opening meeting in Monza showed that he was a likely frontrunner, his first win then coming in round 5 at Brands Hatch. He was classified fourth at the end of the season with 62pts.

Muller finished second in the 2007 WTCC with 81 points, and he lost the title to Guernsey driver Andy Priaulx (BMW 320si) during the last race in Macau where his SEAT León TDI suffered a fuel pump failure when he was leading the first race with one lap to go, which put him out of race 2 at Macau. Muller opened 2008 with a victory at Curitiba, Brazil. Muller was battling for the championship, primarily with teammate Gabriele Tarquini during the season, and finally won the championship at the final round in Macau.

In 2009, Muller was beaten to the title by teammate Tarquini, taking four victories.

==== Chevrolet (2010–2012) ====
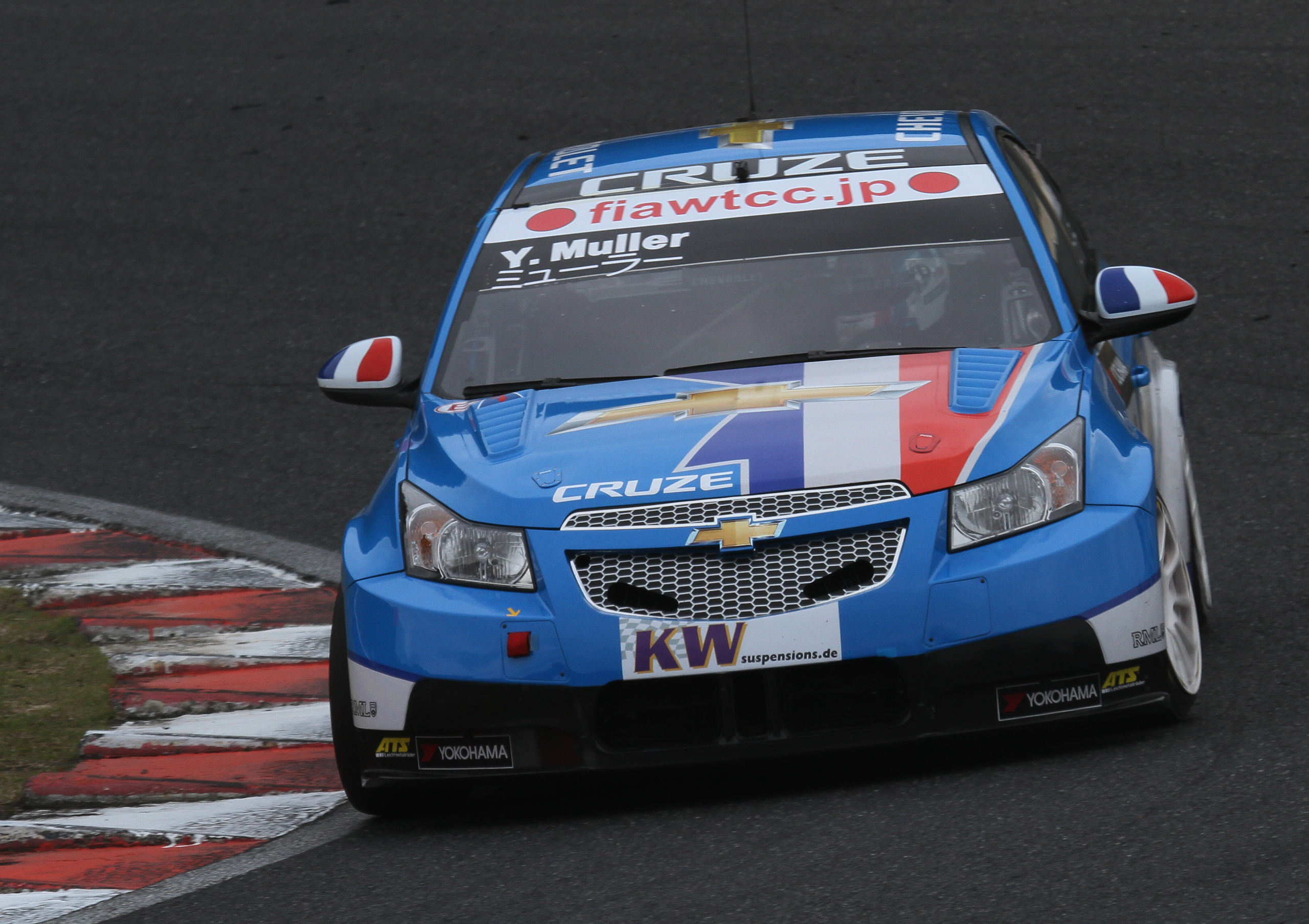
Muller driving the Chevrolet Cruze in 2010.

Muller moved to rival team Chevrolet in 2010. He scored pole position and won his first race for the team in Brazil. He took further wins in Italy and the United Kingdom to become the 2010 World Touring Car Champion and the first driver to win the title for two teams.

Muller stayed with the team in 2011. At the end of the year, he was champion once again after a close battle with teammate Rob Huff, matching Andy Priaulx's record of three WTCC titles. Muller stayed with Chevrolet in 2012.

==== RML (2013) ====
Muller stayed with the RML team for 2013 season, now racing as an independent entry after the withdrawal of Chevrolet from the World Touring Car Championship. He drove a Chevrolet Cruze 1.6T alongside former Team Aon driver Tom Chilton. He won both races at the season opening Race of Italy in wet conditions to score his first victories as an independent touring car driver.

==== Citroën (2014–2016) ====
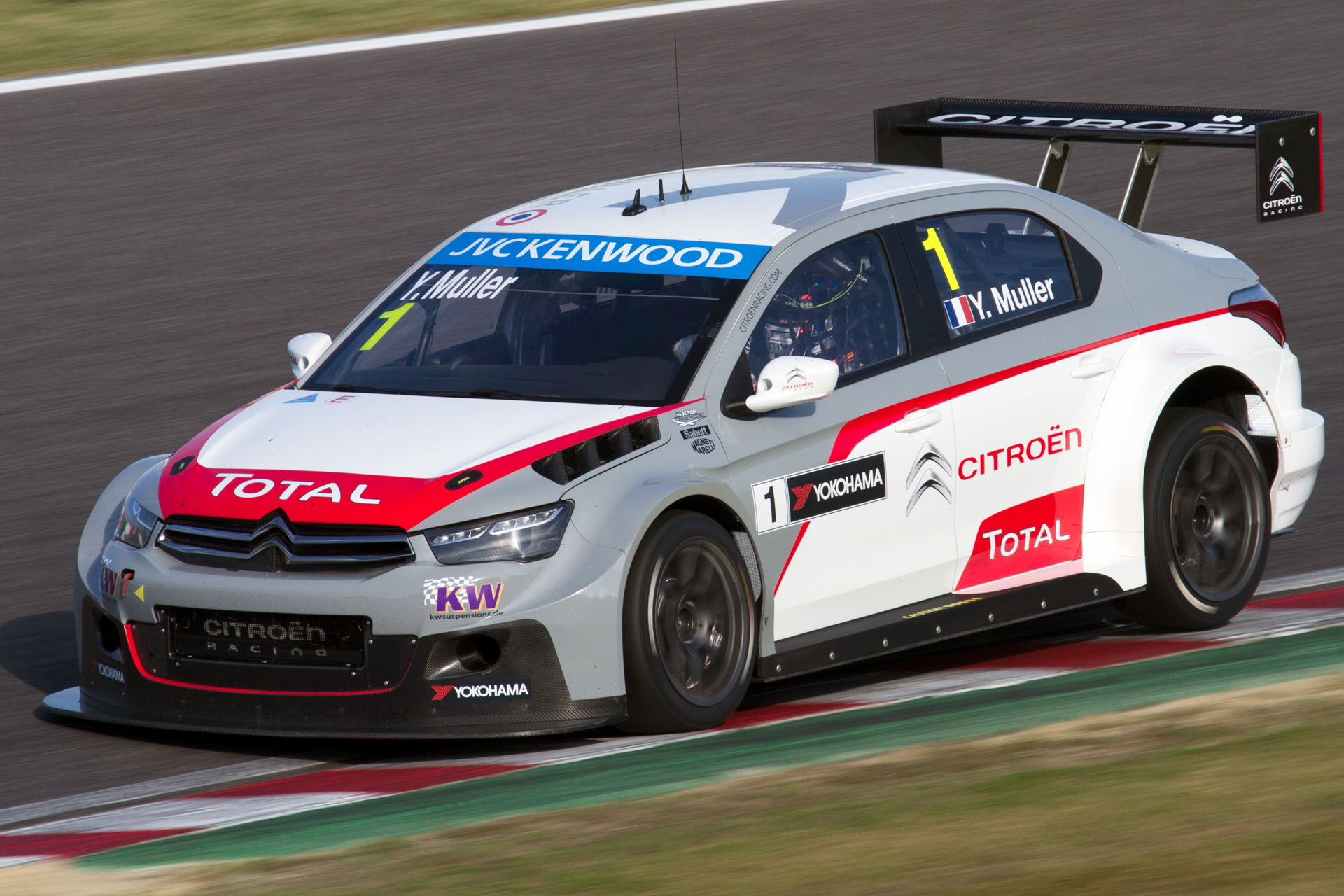
Muller driving the Citroën C-Elysée WTCC at the 2014 Race of Japan.

In August 2013, it was announced that Muller would join Citroën Racing for the 2014 World Touring Car Championship season alongside nine–time World Rally Champion Sébastien Loeb in a two–year deal.

Muller is founder and team principal of Yvan Muller Racing, which enters cars in various motorsport disciplines including sports car racing, and also helps to train young drivers.

Muller announced that the 2016 season would be Muller's last in the WTCC, as he was retiring from the sport to concentrate on his family and race team.

==== Volvo (2017) ====
During 2017, Muller took on a role as test- and development-driver for Polestar Cyan Racing. He returned to the championship to replace Nestor Girolami for the season finale in Qatar.

==== M Racing-YMR (2018) ====
In 2018, Muller returned to full-time racing with a couple self-owned Hyundai i30 N TCRs for himself and Thed Björk. He finished runner-up in the drivers championship and M Racing-YMR was the teams champions.

==== Cyan Racing Lynk & Co (2019-2020) ====
For 2019, Muller returned to Cyan Racing driving one of four Lynk & Co 03 TCRs.

=== Other racing categories ===
Muller primarily races in touring cars, but also participates in other categories. In particular, he has won the Andros Trophy Ice Racing Championship ten times (a record), with 46 race victories (also a record).

During the early years of his career, Muller competed in the 24 Hours of Le Mans in 1993 and 1996, but did not finish. He was originally entered to take part in the 1999 race in an Audi R8C but withdrew from the squad before any official running.

In 2007, Muller participated in the Dakar Rally. In 2009 (following the 2008 cancellation), he also participated in the Dakar Rally in South America, but he withdrew during the fifth stage. He represented France in the 2007 Race of Champions, alongside Sébastien Bourdais. He participated in the Rallye de France–Alsace in a Citroën Xsara WRC, a round of the 2010 World Rally Championship.

== Racing record ==
=== Complete British Formula Two Championship results ===
(key) (Races in bold indicate pole position) (Races in italics indicate fastest lap)

Year	Entrant	Chassis	Engine	1	2	3	4	5	6	7	8	9	10	DC	Pts
1992	Omegaland	Reynard 92D	Cosworth	OUL; 2	DON; DNS	**BRH**; 1	THR; 2	BRH; 1	**OUL**; 1	SNE; 4	BRH; 1	SIL; 2	DON; 6	1st	58

=== Complete International Formula 3000 results ===
(key) (Races in bold indicate pole position) (Races in italics indicate fastest lap)

Year	Entrant	Chassis	Engine	1	2	3	4	5	6	7	8	9	DC	Points
1993	Omegaland	Reynard 93D	Judd	DON; Ret	SIL; Ret	PAU; Ret	PER; Ret	HOC; Ret	NÜR; Ret	SPA; 11	MAG; Ret	NOG; 5	17th	2

=== Complete Italian Touring Car Championship results ===
(key) (Races in bold indicate pole position) (Races in italics indicate fastest lap)

Year	Team	Car	1	2	3	4	5	6	7	8	9	10	11	12	13	14	15	16	17	18	19	20	DC	Pts
1996	Audi Sport Italia	Audi A4 Quattro	MUG; 1; 4	MUG; 2; 5	MAG; 1; 2	MAG; 2; 2	MNZ; 1; 2	MNZ; 2; 2	BIN; 1; 2	BIN; 2; 3	MIS; 1; 4	MIS; 2; 3	IMO; 1; 4	IMO; 2; 3	PER; 1; 3	PER; 2; 4	PER; 1; 5	PER; 2 Ret	VAR; 1 Ret	VAR; 2; 4	VAL; 1; 4	VAL; 2; 6	4th	187

=== Complete Super Tourenwagen Cup results ===
(key) (Races in bold indicate pole position) (Races in italics indicate fastest lap)

Year	Team	Car	1	2	3	4	5	6	7	8	9	10	11	12	13	14	15	16	17	18	19	20	DC	Pts
1997	AZK/ROC	Audi A4	HOC; 1; 12	HOC; 2; 11	ZOL; 1; 10	ZOL; 2; 11	NÜR; 1; 20	NÜR; 2 Ret	SAC; 1; 13	SAC; 2; 6	NOR; 1; 11	NOR; 2; 19	WUN; 1 Ret	WUN; 2 Ret	ZWE; 1; 6	ZWE; 2; 6	SAL; 1; 6	SAL; 2; 6	REG; 1; 4	REG; 2; 4	NÜR; 1; 7	NÜR; 2; 6	7th	298

=== Complete British Touring Car Championship results ===
(key) Races in bold indicate pole position (1 point awarded – 1998–2002 all races, 2003–present just in first race) Races in italics indicate fastest lap (1 point awarded – 2001–present all races) * signifies that driver lead race for at least one lap (1 point given – 1998–2002 just in feature race, 2003–present all races)

Year	Team	Car	Class	1	2	3	4	5	6	7	8	9	10	11	12	13	14	15	16	17	18	19	20	21	22	23	24	25	26	27	28	29	30	Pen.	Pos	Pts
1998	Audi Sport UK	Audi A4		THR; 1; 9	THR; 2 Ret	SIL; 1; 10	SIL; 2; 8	DON; 1; 6	DON; 2; 10	BRH; 1; 5	BRH; 2; 15	OUL; 1; 10	OUL; 2; 10	DON; 1; 7	DON; 2; 4*	CRO; 1; 5	CRO; 2; 10	SNE; 1; 15	SNE; 2; 5*	THR; 1; 6	THR; 2; 10	KNO; 1; 4	KNO; 2; 2	BRH; 1; 11	BRH; 2; 6	OUL; 1; 5	OUL; 2; 3	SIL; 1; 3	SIL; 2; 5						7th	110
1999	Vauxhall Motorsport	Vauxhall Vectra		DON; 1; 6	DON; 2; 10	SIL; 1 Ret	SIL; 2; 2	THR; 1 Ret	THR; 2; 11	BRH; 1; 1	BRH; 2; 5	OUL; 1; 8	OUL; 2; 3	DON; 1; 4	DON; 2; 5	CRO; 1; 8	CRO; 2; 8	SNE; 1 Ret	SNE; 2; 3	THR; 1; 8	THR; 2; 6	KNO; 1; 10	KNO; 2; 7	BRH; 1; 12	BRH; 2 Ret	OUL; 1; 9	OUL; 2; 5	SIL; 1; 3	SIL; 2; 5						6th	119
2000	Vauxhall Motorsport	Vauxhall Vectra	S	BRH; 1 ovr:2 cls:2	BRH; 2 ovr:3 cls:3	DON; 1 Ret	DON; 2 ovr:5 cls:5	**THR**; **1** ovr:1 cls:1	THR; 2 ovr:1* cls:1	KNO; 1 ovr:7 cls:7	KNO; 2 ovr:4 cls:4	OUL; 1 Ret	OUL; 2 ovr:5 cls:5	SIL; 1 ovr:7 cls:7	SIL; 2 ovr:1* cls:1	CRO; 1 ovr:8 cls:8	CRO; 2 ovr:5 cls:5	SNE; 1 Ret	SNE; 2 ovr:4 cls:4	DON; 1 ovr:4 cls:4	DON; 2 ovr:4 cls:4	BRH; 1 ovr:5 cls:5	BRH; 2 ovr:6 cls:6	OUL; 1 ovr:3 cls:3	OUL; 2 ovr:3 cls:3	SIL; 1 ovr:8 cls:8	SIL; 2 ovr:5 cls:5								4th	168
2001	Vauxhall Motorsport	Vauxhall Astra Coupé	T	**BRH**; **1**; 1†	**BRH**; **2** Ret*	THR; 1 ovr:2 cls:2	THR; 2 ovr:1* cls:1	**OUL**; **1** ovr:7 cls:1	**OUL**; **2** ovr:1* cls:1	**SIL**; **1** ovr:4 cls:2	**SIL**; **2** ovr:3* cls:3	**MON**; **1** ovr:1 cls:1	**MON**; **2** ovr:1* cls:1	DON; 1 ovr:3 cls:3	DON; 2 ovr:3* cls:3	KNO; 1 ovr:4 cls:2	KNO; 2 Ret	SNE; 1 ovr:2 cls:1	SNE; 2 ovr:2* cls:2	CRO; 1 ovr:3 cls:2	CRO; 2 ovr:1* cls:1	OUL; 1 ovr:1 cls:1	OUL; 2 Ret	SIL; 1 ovr:2 cls:2	SIL; 2 ovr:2* cls:2	DON; 1 ovr:6 cls:3	DON; 2 ovr:1* cls:1	**BRH**; **1** ovr:4 cls:3	BRH; 2 Ret*						**2nd**	**318**
2002	Vauxhall Motorsport	Vauxhall Astra Coupé	T	**BRH**; **1** ovr:5 cls:5	**BRH**; **2** ovr:2* cls:2	OUL; 1 ovr:1 cls:1	OUL; 2 ovr:10* cls:10	**THR**; **1** Ret	**THR**; **2** ovr:1* cls:1	SIL; 1 ovr:9 cls:9	SIL; 2 ovr:10 cls:10	**MON**; **1** Ret	MON; 2 ovr:1* cls:1	CRO; 1 Ret	CRO; 2 ovr:1* cls:1	SNE; 1 ovr:2 cls:2	SNE; 2 ovr:1* cls:1	KNO; 1 ovr:4 cls:4	KNO; 2 ovr:2 cls:2	BRH; 1 ovr:3 cls:3	BRH; 2 ovr:6 cls:6	DON; 1 ovr:5 cls:5	DON; 2 Ret											−5	**2nd**	**163**
2003	VX Racing	Vauxhall Astra Coupé	T	**MON**; **1** ovr:2* cls:2	MON; 2 ovr:2* cls:2	BRH; 1 ovr:2 cls:2	BRH; 2 ovr:1* cls:1	THR; 1 ovr:1* cls:1	**THR**; **2** ovr:1* cls:1	SIL; 1 ovr:2* cls:2	SIL; 2 ovr:1* cls:1	ROC; 1 ovr:3 cls:3	ROC; 2 ovr:1* cls:1	CRO; 1 Ret	CRO; 2 ovr:3 cls:3	SNE; 1 ovr:3 cls:3	SNE; 2 Ret	**BRH**; **1** ovr:2* cls:2	BRH; 2 ovr:5* cls:5	DON; 1 ovr:3 cls:3	DON; 2 ovr:1* cls:1	OUL; 1 ovr:3 cls:3	OUL; 2 ovr:2* cls:2												**1st**	**233**
2004	VX Racing	Vauxhall Astra Coupé		THR; 1; 3	THR; 2; 2	THR; 3; 1*	BRH; 1; 5	BRH; 2; 3	BRH; 3; 3	SIL; 1; 2	SIL; 2; 2	SIL; 3 Ret	OUL; 1; 1*	OUL; 2; 8	OUL; 3; 1*	**MON**; **1**; 1*	MON; 2; 4	MON; 3; 6	CRO; 1; 2	CRO; 2; 6	CRO; 3; 5	KNO; 1; 5	KNO; 2; 4	KNO; 3; 9	BRH; 1; 2	BRH; 2; 8	BRH; 3; 5	SNE; 1; 5	SNE; 2; 4	SNE; 3; 2	DON; 1; 7	DON; 2; 2	DON; 3; 1*		**2nd**	**273**
2005	VX Racing	Vauxhall Astra Sport Hatch		DON; 1; 2*	DON; 2; 1*	DON; 3; 3	THR; 1; 6	THR; 2; 3	THR; 3; 3	BRH; 1; 3	BRH; 2; 4	BRH; 3; 1*	OUL; 1; 4	OUL; 2; 2	OUL; 3 Ret	CRO; 1; 2	CRO; 2; 1*	CRO; 3; 8	**MON**; **1**; 1*	**MON**; **2**; 6	MON; 3; 1*	SNE; 1; 4	SNE; 2; 4	SNE; 3; 3	KNO; 1; 1*	**KNO**; **2**; 2*	KNO; 3 Ret	SIL; 1; 4	SIL; 2 Ret	SIL; 3; 5	BRH; 1; 2	BRH; 2; 11	BRH; 3 Ret		**2nd**	**273**

† Event with 2 races staged for the different classes.

=== Complete European Touring Car Championship results ===
(key) (Races in bold indicate pole position) (Races in italics indicate fastest lap)

Year	Team	Car	1	2	3	4	5	6	7	8	9	10	11	12	13	14	15	16	17	18	19	20	DC	Pts
2001	Alfa Romeo Team Nordauto	Alfa Romeo 156	MNZ; 1	MNZ; 2	BRN; 1	BRN; 2	MAG; 1	MAG; 2	SIL; 1	SIL; 2	ZOL; 1	ZOL; 2	HUN; 1	HUN; 2	A1R; 1	A1R; 2	NÜR; 1	NÜR; 2	JAR; 1	JAR; 2	**EST**; **1**; 1	EST; 2; 6	24th	66
2003	SEAT Sport	SEAT Toledo Cupra	VAL; 1	VAL; 2	MAG; 1	MAG; 2	PER; 1	PER; 2	BRN; 1	BRN; 2	DON; 1	DON; 2	SPA; 1	SPA; 2	AND; 1	AND; 2	OSC; 1	OSC; 2	EST; 1; 17†	EST; 2 DNS	MNZ; 1 Ret	MNZ; 2 Ret	NC	0

† – Did not finish the race, but was classified as he completed over 90% of the race distance.

=== Complete World Touring Car Championship results ===
(key) (Races in bold indicate pole position) (Races in italics indicate fastest lap)

Year	Team	Car	1	2	3	4	5	6	7	8	9	10	11	12	13	14	15	16	17	18	19	20	21	22	23	24	DC	Points
2006	SEAT Sport France	SEAT León	ITA; 1; 2	ITA; 2; 2	FRA; 1; 13	FRA; 2; 7	GBR; 1; 1	GBR; 2; 5	GER; 1; 11	GER; 2; 8	BRA; 1; 13	BRA; 2; 13	MEX; 1; 14	MEX; 2 Ret	CZE; 1; 3	CZE; 2; 3	TUR; 1; 13	TUR; 2 Ret	ESP; 1; 10	ESP; 2; 6	MAC; 1; 3	MAC; 2; 2					4th	62
2007	SEAT Sport	SEAT León	BRA; 1; 8	**BRA**; **2**; 4	NED; 1 NC	NED; 2; 12	ESP; 1; 3	ESP; 2; 4	FRA; 1; 2	FRA; 2; 6	CZE; 1; 6	CZE; 2 DNS	POR; 1; 4	POR; 2; 5													**2nd**	**81**
2007	SEAT Sport	SEAT León TDI													SWE; 1; 6	SWE; 2 Ret	GER; 1; 1	GER; 2; 5	GBR; 1; 4	GBR; 2; 5	**ITA**; **1**; 1	ITA; 2; 5	MAC; 1; 27†	MAC; 2 DNS			**2nd**	**81**
2008	SEAT Sport	SEAT León TDI	**BRA**; **1**; 1	BRA; 2; 5	MEX; 1; 6	MEX; 2; 4	**ESP**; **1**; 4	ESP; 2; 8	FRA; 1; 2	FRA; 2; 7	CZE; 1; 8	**CZE**; **2**; 5	POR; 1; 3	POR; 2; 2	GBR; 1; 2	GBR; 2; 11	GER; 1; 11	GER; 2; 8	EUR; 1; 1	EUR; 2; 5	**ITA**; **1**; 1	ITA; 2; 4	JPN; 1; 7	JPN; 2; 6	MAC; 1; 3	MAC; 2; 2	**1st**	**114**
2009	SEAT Sport	SEAT León TDI	**BRA**; **1**; 1	BRA; 2; 4	MEX; 1; 4	MEX; 2; 1	MAR; 1; 4	MAR; 2; 2	FRA; 1; 11	FRA; 2; 7	ESP; 1; 1	ESP; 2; 7	CZE; 1; 8	**CZE**; **2**; 2	POR; 1; 3	POR; 2; 2	GBR; 1 Ret	GBR; 2; 7	GER; 1 NC	GER; 2; 7	ITA; 1; 2	ITA; 2; 1	JPN; 1; 4	JPN; 2; 3	MAC; 1; 5	MAC; 2; 3	**2nd**	**123**
2010	Chevrolet	Chevrolet Cruze LT	**BRA**; **1**; 1	BRA; 2; 4	MAR; 1; 6	MAR; 2; 2	ITA; 1; 4	ITA; 2; 1	BEL; 1; 2	BEL; 2; 5	POR; 1; 2	POR; 2; 2	**GBR**; **1**; 1	GBR; 2; 5	CZE; 1 NC	CZE; 2; 12	GER; 1; 3	GER; 2; 3	ESP; 1; 2	ESP; 2; 2	JPN; 1; 2	JPN; 2; 2	MAC; 1; 2	MAC; 2; 4			**1st**	**331**
2011	Chevrolet	Chevrolet Cruze 1.6T	BRA; 1; 2	BRA; 2; 3	BEL; 1; 3	BEL; 2 Ret	ITA; 1; 2	ITA; 2; 2	HUN; 1; 5	HUN; 2; 1	**CZE**; **1**; 2	CZE; 2; 1	POR; 1; 2	POR; 2; 2	**GBR**; **1**; 1	GBR; 2; 1	**GER**; **1**; 1	GER; 2; 5	**ESP**; **1**; 1	ESP; 2; 1	JPN; 1; 4	JPN; 2; 2	CHN; 1; 4	CHN; 2; 1	MAC; 1; 2	MAC; 2; 3	**1st**	**433**
2012	Chevrolet	Chevrolet Cruze 1.6T	ITA; 1; 1	ITA; 2; 1	**ESP**; **1**; 1	ESP; 2; 8	MAR; 1; 3	MAR; 2; 1	SVK; 1; 10	SVK; 2; 2	**HUN**; **1**; 1	HUN; 2; 10	AUT; 1; 2	AUT; 2; 8	POR; 1; 1	POR; 2; 5	**BRA**; **1**; 1	BRA; 2; 4	USA; 1; 1	USA; 2; 14	JPN; 1; 2	JPN; 2; 6	CHN; 1 Ret	CHN; 2; 13	MAC; 1; 1	MAC; 2; 3	**3rd**	**393**
2013	RML	Chevrolet Cruze 1.6T	**ITA**; **1**; 1	ITA; 2; 1	MAR; 1; 4	MAR; 2; 2	SVK; 1; 4	SVK; 2; 2	**HUN**; **1**; 1	HUN; 2; 5	AUT; 1; 3	AUT; 2; 2	**RUS**; **1**; 1	RUS; 2; 2	**POR**; **1**; 1	POR; 2; 7	**ARG**; **1**; 1	ARG; 2; 13	USA; 1; 3	USA; 2; 4	JPN; 1; 3	JPN; 2 Ret	**CHN**; **1**; 2	CHN; 2; 5	**MAC**; **1**; 1	MAC; 2; 6	**1st**	**431**
2014	Citroën Total WTCC	Citroën C-Elysée WTCC	MAR; 1; 3	MAR; 2 Ret	**FRA**; **1**; 1	FRA; 2; 2	**HUN**; **1**; 1	HUN; 2; 5	SVK; 1; 10	SVK; 2 C	**AUT**; **1**; 1	AUT; 2 Ret	RUS; 1; 4	RUS; 2; 2	**BEL**; **1**; 1	BEL; 2; 2	ARG; 1; 3	ARG; 2; 3	BEI; 1; 2	BEI; 2; 9	CHN; 1; 3	CHN; 2 Ret	JPN; 1 Ret	JPN; 2; 5	MAC; 1; 5	MAC; 2; 2	**2nd**	**336**
2015	Citroën Total WTCC	Citroën C-Elysée WTCC	ARG; 1; 2	ARG; 2; 11	MAR; 1; 5	**MAR**; **2**; 1	**HUN**; **1**; 2	HUN; 2; 7	GER; 1; 3	GER; 2; 1	**RUS**; **1**; 1	RUS; 2; 6	**SVK**; **1**; 1	SVK; 2; 3	FRA; 1; 2	FRA; 2; 4	POR; 1; 7	POR; 2; 2	JPN; 1; 5	JPN; 2; 15†	CHN; 1; 2	CHN; 2; 1	THA; 1 Ret	THA; 2 Ret	QAT; 1; 6	QAT; 2; 1	2nd	357
2016	Citroën Total WTCC	Citroën C-Elysée WTCC	FRA; 1; 13	FRA; 2; 4	SVK; 1; 7	**SVK**; **2**; 5	HUN; 1; 12	HUN; 2; 2	MAR; 1; 3	MAR; 2; 2	GER; 1 Ret	GER; 2 DNS	RUS; 1; 3	RUS; 2; 11	POR; 1; 9	POR; 2; 2	ARG; 1; 3	ARG; 2; 5	JPN; 1; 5	JPN; 2; 1	CHN; 1; 3	CHN; 2; 2	QAT; 1; 4	QAT; 2; 6			2nd	257
2017	Polestar Cyan Racing	Volvo S60 Polestar TC1	MAR; 1	MAR; 2	ITA; 1	ITA; 2	HUN; 1	HUN; 2	GER; 1	GER; 2	POR; 1	POR; 2	ARG; 1	ARG; 2	CHN; 1	CHN; 2	JPN; 1	JPN; 2	MAC; 1	MAC; 2	QAT; 1; 6	QAT; 2; 7					15th	16

^{†} Did not finish the race, but was classified as he completed over 90% of the race distance.

=== Complete World Touring Car Cup results ===
(key) (Races in bold indicate pole position) (Races in italics indicate fastest lap)

Year	Team	Car	1	2	3	4	5	6	7	8	9	10	11	12	13	14	15	16	17	18	19	20	21	22	23	24	25	26	27	28	29	30	DC	Points
2018	M Racing - YMR	Hyundai i30 N TCR	MAR; 1; 11	MAR; 2; 9	MAR; 3; 2	HUN; 1; 4	HUN; 2; 3	HUN; 3; 3	GER; 1; 1	GER; 2; 4	GER; 3; 3	NED; 1 Ret	NED; 2; 24†	NED; 3 Ret	POR; 1; 1	POR; 2; 2	POR; 3; 11	SVK; 1; 12	SVK; 2; 3	SVK; 3 Ret	CHN; 1; 7	CHN; 2; 1	CHN; 3 Ret	WUH; 1; 15	WUH; 2; 9	WUH; 3 Ret	JPN; 1; 3	JPN; 2; 10	JPN; 3; 21	MAC; 1; 2	MAC; 2; 3	MAC; 3; 4	2nd	303
2019	Cyan Racing Lynk & Co	Lynk & Co 03 TCR	MAR; 1; 18	MAR; 2; 7	MAR; 3 Ret	HUN; 1; 2	HUN; 2; 6	HUN; 3 Ret	SVK; 1; 11	SVK; 2; 11	SVK; 3; 14	NED; 1; 2	NED; 2; 9	NED; 3; 5	GER; 1 Ret	GER; 2; 15	GER; 3; 10	POR; 1; 9	POR; 2; 6	POR; 3; 2	**CHN**; **1**; 1	CHN; 2; 3	**CHN**; **3**; 1	JPN; 1; 11	JPN; 2; 14	JPN; 3; 13	**MAC**; **1**; 1	MAC; 2; 1	MAC; 3; 6	MAL; 1; 6	MAL; 2; 6	MAL; 3; 11	3rd	331
2020	Cyan Racing Lynk & Co	Lynk & Co 03 TCR	BEL; 1; 8	BEL; 2; 2	GER; 1; 2	GER; 2; 7	SVK; 1; 14	SVK; 2; 8	SVK; 3; 13	HUN; 1; 4	HUN; 2; 2	HUN; 3; 9	ESP; 1; 7	ESP; 2; 2	ESP; 3; 14	ARA; 1; 7	ARA; 2; 1	ARA; 3; 4															2nd	195
2021	Cyan Racing Lynk & Co	Lynk & Co 03 TCR	GER; 1; 2	GER; 2; 7	POR; 1; 2	POR; 2; 9	ESP; 1; 11	ESP; 2; 10	HUN; 1; 15	HUN; 2; 6	CZE; 1; 4	CZE; 2; 6	FRA; 1 Ret	**FRA**; **2**; 2	ITA; 1; 5	ITA; 2; 4	RUS; 1; 8	**RUS**; **2** Ret															4th	169
2022	Cyan Racing Lynk & Co	Lynk & Co 03 TCR	FRA; 1; 3	FRA; 2; 6	GER; 1 C	GER; 2 C	HUN; 1; 10	HUN; 2; 9	ESP; 1; 7	ESP; 2; 7	POR; 1; 14	POR; 2; 4	ITA; 1 DNS	ITA; 2 DNS	ALS; 1 WD	ALS; 2 WD	BHR; 1	BHR; 2	SAU; 1	SAU; 2													14th	78

^{†} Driver did not finish the race, but was classified as he completed over 90% of the race distance.

=== WTCC statistics ===
Season	Series	Team	Starts	Wins	Podiums	Poles	Fastest laps	Points	Place
2006	WTCC	SEAT Sport France	20	1	7	0	2	62	4th
2007	WTCC	SEAT Sport	20	2	4	1	1	81	**2nd**
2008	WTCC	SEAT Sport	24	3	9	3	1	114	**1st**
2009	WTCC	SEAT Sport	24	4	11	1	2	123	**2nd**
2010	WTCC	Chevrolet	22	3	14	2	1	331	**1st**
2011	WTCC	Chevrolet	24	8	19	4	8	433	**1st**
2012	WTCC	Chevrolet	24	9	14	3	8	393	**3rd**
2013	WTCC	RML	24	7	15	7	7	431	**1st**
2014	WTCC	Citroën Total WTCC	23	4	13	4	3	336	**2nd**
2015	WTCC	Citroën Total WTCC	24	6	13	3	4	357	**2nd**
2016	WTCC	Citroën Total WTCC	21	1	9	1	1	257	**2nd**
2017	WTCC	Polestar Cyan Racing	2	0	0	0	0	16	15th
Overall			**252**	**48**	**128**	**29**	**38**	**2934**	

=== 24 Hours of Le Mans results ===
Year	Team	Co-drivers	Car	Class	Laps	Pos.	Class pos.
1993	(France) Didier Bonnet Racing	(France) Gérard Tremblay (France) Georges Tessier	Debora SP93	LMP	259	DNF	DNF
1996	(United States) Rocketsports	(Spain) Fermin Velez (United States) Andy Evans	Ferrari 333 SP	WSC	31	DNF	DNF

=== Complete World Rally Championship results ===
Year	Entrant	Car	1	2	3	4	5	6	7	8	9	10	11	12	13	WDC	Points
2010	Petter Solberg World Rally Team	Citroën Xsara WRC	SWE	MEX	JOR	TUR	NZL	POR	BUL	FIN	DEU	JPN	FRA; 42	ESP	GBR	NC	0
2011	Yvan Muller	Peugeot 207 S2000	SWE	MEX	POR	JOR	ITA	ARG	GRE	FIN	DEU	AUS	FRA; 31	ESP	GBR	NC	0
2012	Yvan Muller	Mini John Cooper Works WRC	MON	SWE	MEX	POR	ARG	GRE	NZL	FIN	GER	GBR	FRA; 14	ITA	ESP	NC	0

=== Complete V8 Supercar results ===
Year	Team	Car	1	2	3	4	5	6	7	8	9	10	11	12	13	14	15	16	17	18	19	20	21	22	23	24	25	26	27	28	29	30	31	32	33	Final pos	Points
2000	Holden Racing Team	Holden VT Commodore	PHI; R1	PHI; R2	BAR; R3	BAR; R4	BAR; R5	ADE; R6	ADE; R7	EAS; R8	EAS; R9	EAS; R10	HID; R11	HID; R12	HID; R13	CAN; R14	CAN; R15	CAN; R16	QLD; R17	QLD; R18	QLD; R19	WIN; R20	WIN; R21	WIN; R22	ORA; R23	ORA; R24	ORA; R25	CAL; R26	CAL; R27	CAL; R28	QLD; R29	SAN; R30	SAN; R31	SAN; R32	BAT; R33; 10	33rd	120
2002	K-mart Racing Team	Holden VX Commodore	ADE; R1	ADE; R2	PHI; R3	PHI; R4	EAS; R5	EAS; R6	EAS; R7	HID; R8	HID; R9	HID; R10	CAN; R11	CAN; R12	CAN; R13	BAR; R14	BAR; R15	BAR; R16	ORA; R17	ORA; R18	WIN; R19	WIN; R20	QLD; R21; Ret	BAT; R22; Ret	SUR; R23	SUR; R24	PUK; R25	PUK; R26	PUK; R27	SAN; R28	SAN; R29					NC	0
2004	Triple Eight Race Engineering	Ford BA Falcon	ADE; R1	ADE; R2	EAS; R3	PUK; R4	PUK; R5	PUK; R6	HID; R7	HID; R8	HID; R9	BAR; R10	BAR; R11	BAR; R12	QLD; R13	WIN; R14	ORA; R15	ORA; R16	SAN; R17; Ret	BAT; R18; Ret	SUR; R19	SUR; R20	SYM; R21	SYM; R22	SYM; R23	EAS; R24	EAS; R25	EAS; R26								NC	0
2005	Triple Eight Race Engineering	Ford BA Falcon	ADE; R1	ADE; R2	PUK; R3	PUK; R4	PUK; R5	BAR; R6	BAR; R7	BAR; R8	EAS; R9	EAS; R10	SHA; R11	SHA; R12	SHA; R13	HID; R14	HID; R15	HID; R16	QLD; R17	ORA; R18	ORA; R19	SAN; R20; 1	BAT; R21; 15	SUR; R22	SUR; R23	SUR; R24	SYM; R25	SYM; R26	SYM; R27	PHI; R28	PHI; R29	PHI; R30				38th	192
2010	Paul Morris Motorsport	Holden VE Commodore	YMC; R1	YMC; R2	BHR; R3	BHR; R4	ADE; R5	ADE; R6	HAM; R7	HAM; R8	QLD; R9	QLD; R10	WIN; R11	WIN; R12	HID; R13	HID; R14	TOW; R15	TOW; R16	PHI; R17	BAT; R18	SUR; R19; 13	SUR; R20; 15	SYM; R21	SYM; R22	SAN; R23	SAN; R24	SYD; R25	SYD; R26								NC +	0 +

+ Guest Driver

=== Complete NASCAR results ===
==== Euro Series – EuroNASCAR PRO ====
(key) (Bold – Pole position. Italics – Fastest lap. * – Most laps led. ^ – Most positions gained)

NASCAR Euro Series – EuroNASCAR PRO results
Year	Team	No.	Make	1	2	3	4	5	6	7	8	9	10	11	12	NES	Pts
2025	M Racing	34	Chevy	ESP; 3	ESP; 4	ITA; 18	ITA; 20	GBR	GBR	CZE	CZE	GER	GER	BEL	BEL	27th	95

Sporting positions
Preceded by Paul Warwick (British F3000)	British Formula 2 Championship champion 1992	Succeeded by Philippe Adams
Preceded by JJ Lehto; Tommi Mäkinen; Kari Tiainen	Race of Champions; Nations' Cup Winner; 2000; With: Régis Laconi & Gilles Panizzi	Succeeded by Fernando Alonso; Jesús Puras; Rubén Xaus
Preceded by James Thompson	British Touring Car Championship; Champion; 2003	Succeeded by James Thompson
Preceded by Andy Priaulx	World Touring Car Championship; Champion; 2008	Succeeded by Gabriele Tarquini
Preceded by Gabriele Tarquini	World Touring Car Championship; Champion; 2010–2011	Succeeded by Robert Huff
Preceded by Robert Huff	World Touring Car Championship; Champion; 2013	Succeeded by José María López
