= 1994 French Supertouring Championship =

1994 Championnat de France de Supertourisme

Seasons
- ← 1993 1995 →

The 1994 French Supertouring Championship was the twentieth season of the French Supertouring Championship. The season began in Nogaro on 4 April and finished in Lédenon on 23 October. The championship was won by Laurent Aïello driving a Peugeot 405 for the Peugeot Talbot Sport.

== Teams and drivers ==
Team	Car	No.	Drivers	Round
(France) Team BMW Fina	BMW 318i	2	(France) Jean-Marc Gounon	All
(France) Team BMW Fina	BMW 318i	3	(France) Yvan Muller	All
(France) Team BMW Fina	BMW 318i	26	(France) Olivier Couvreur	7
(France) Team BMW Fina	BMW 318i	26	(France) William David	3-6, 8, 11
(France) Peugeot Talbot Sport	Peugeot 405	4	(France) Yannick Dalmas	All
(France) Peugeot Talbot Sport	Peugeot 405	8	(France) Laurent Aïello	All
(France) Peugeot Talbot Sport	Peugeot 405	9	(Monaco) Stéphane Ortelli	All
(France) ROC Compétition	Volkswagen Vento	5	(France) Marc Sourd	3-6, 8-12
SEAT France Racing	SEAT Toledo	6	(Switzerland) Jean-Denis Délétraz	All
SEAT France Racing	SEAT Toledo	7	(France) Fabien Giroix	All
SEAT France Racing	SEAT Toledo	10	(France) Olivier Thévenin	All
(France) Graff Racing	Ford Mondeo	11	(France) Philippe Gache	All
(France) Large-Tremblay Racing	BMW 318i	12	(France) Gérard Tremblay	2, 4-5, 7-8, 10, 12
(France) Large-Tremblay Racing	BMW 318i	12	(France) Jean-Pierre Large	2, 4-5, 7-8, 10, 12
(France) Team MNS	Honda Civic	14	(France) Michel Quagliozzi	11-12
(France) Garage Mirabeau	BMW 318i	15	(France) Arnaud Trevisiol	All
Opel France	Opel Vectra	16	(France) Jacques Laffite	All
Opel France	Opel Vectra	17	(France) Alain Cudini	All
Opel France	Opel Vectra	18	(France) Éric Hélary	All
(France) Team Bandura	Peugeot 405	19	(France) Michel Bandura	All
(France) Team Bandura	Peugeot 405	19	(France) Daniel Bandura	1-5, 7-12
(France) Pérus Racing	Ford Sierra	20	(France) Maurice Pérus	1-6
(France) Pérus Racing	BMW 318i	20	(France) Maurice Pérus	8
(France) Pérus Racing	Opel Astra	20	(France) Maurice Pérus	9-10, 12
(France) Basso Racing	BMW 318i	21	(France) Jean-Claude Basso	11
(France) Duprey Racing	BMW 318i	26	(France) Arnaud Duprey	9-10, 12
(France) Duprey Racing	BMW 325i	28	(France) Arnaud Duprey	8
(France) Wira Peugeot	Peugeot 405	27	(France) Bernard Thuner	4

== Race calendar and results ==
Round		Circuit	Date	Winning driver	Winning team	Winning car
1	R1	Circuit de Nogaro	4 April	(France) Laurent Aïello	Peugeot Talbot Sport	Peugeot 405
1	R2	Circuit de Nogaro	4 April	(France) Yvan Muller	Team BMW Fina	BMW 318i
2	R1	Circuit de Nevers Magny-Cours	1 May	(France) Laurent Aïello	Peugeot Talbot Sport	Peugeot 405
2	R2	Circuit de Nevers Magny-Cours	1 May	(France) Laurent Aïello	Peugeot Talbot Sport	Peugeot 405
3	R1	Grand Prix de Pau	22 May	(France) Alain Cudini	Opel France	Opel Vectra
3	R2	Grand Prix de Pau	22 May	(France) Laurent Aïello	Peugeot Talbot Sport	Peugeot 405
4	R1	Dijon-Prenois	5 June	(France) Yannick Dalmas	Peugeot Talbot Sport	Peugeot 405
4	R2	Dijon-Prenois	5 June	(France) Yannick Dalmas	Peugeot Talbot Sport	Peugeot 405
5	R1	Charade Circuit	12 June	(France) Laurent Aïello	Peugeot Talbot Sport	Peugeot 405
5	R2	Charade Circuit	12 June	(France) Laurent Aïello	Peugeot Talbot Sport	Peugeot 405
6	R1	Circuit du Val de Vienne	26 June	(France) Laurent Aïello	Peugeot Talbot Sport	Peugeot 405
6	R2	Circuit du Val de Vienne	26 June	(France) Laurent Aïello	Peugeot Talbot Sport	Peugeot 405
7	R1	Circuit de Croix-en-Ternois	17 July	(France) Laurent Aïello	Peugeot Talbot Sport	Peugeot 405
7	R2	Circuit de Croix-en-Ternois	17 July	(France) Yvan Muller	Team BMW Fina	BMW 318i
8	R1	Circuit Paul Ricard	24 July	(France) Yvan Muller	Team BMW Fina	BMW 318i
8	R2	Circuit Paul Ricard	24 July	(France) Jean-Marc Gounon	Team BMW Fina	BMW 318i
9	R1	Circuit d'Albi	4 September	(France) Alain Cudini	Opel France	Opel Vectra
9	R2	Circuit d'Albi	4 September	(France) Jacques Laffite	Opel France	Opel Vectra
10	R1	Circuit Bugatti	18 September	(France) Alain Cudini	Opel France	Opel Vectra
10	R2	Circuit Bugatti	18 September	(France) Laurent Aïello	Peugeot Talbot Sport	Peugeot 405
11	R1	Autodrome de Linas-Montlhéry	2 October	(France) Alain Cudini	Opel France	Opel Vectra
11	R2	Autodrome de Linas-Montlhéry	2 October	(France) Alain Cudini	Opel France	Opel Vectra
12	R1	Circuit de Lédenon	23 October	(France) Laurent Aïello	Peugeot Talbot Sport	Peugeot 405
12	R2	Circuit de Lédenon	23 October	(France) Yannick Dalmas	Peugeot Talbot Sport	Peugeot 405

== Championship standings ==
Points system given by the sum of the timing of the 2 races
**1st**	**2nd**	**3rd**	**4th**	**5th**	**6th**	**7th**	**8th**	**9th**	**10th**
20	15	12	10	8	6	4	3	2	1

- for each round it is calculated the sum of the absolute standing plus the best result achieved between the 2 races

Points system each single race
**1st**	**2nd**	**3rd**	**4th**	**5th**	**6th**	**7th**	**8th**
10	8	6	5	4	3	2	1

=== Drivers' Championship ===
Pos	Driver	Car	NOG (France)		MOC (France)		PAU (France)		DIJ (France)		CHA (France)		VGP (France)		CRT (France)		LCA (France)		ALB (France)		LMS (France)		LMO (France)		LED (France)		Pts
1	(France) Laurent Aïello	Peugeot	1	Ret	1	1	2	1	Ret	DNS	1	1	1	1	1	4	3	3	3	4	2	1	3	7	1	2	**259**
2	(France) Alain Cudini	Opel	3	Ret	4	2	1	Ret	3	3	2	3	3	2	4	2	4	5	1	5	1	4	1	1	3	5	240
3	(France) Yvan Muller	BMW	4	1	5	4	5	5	5	6	4	9	4	3	3	1	1	2	4	2	4	3	9	3	5	3	219
4	(France) Yannick Dalmas	Peugeot	2	3	2	3	4	2	1	1	3	5	5	5	2	7	7	6	6	7	Ret	5	4	Ret	2	1	204
5	(France) Éric Hélary	Opel	Ret		13	6	7	4	4	2	Ret	2	2	6	12	DNS	5	7	Ret	Ret	3	2	2	2	4	Ret	125
6	(France) Jean-Marc Gounon	BMW	10	Ret	3	11	8	3	6	8	5	4	Ret	Ret	5	3	2	1	5	3	5	6	5	Ret	Ret	4	124
7	(France) Philippe Gache	Ford	6	2	7	5	6	Ret	7	13	6	7	6	4	Ret	DNS	10	DNS	7	6	6	7	7	5	Ret	Ret	95
8	(France) Jacques Laffite	Opel		DNS	6	Ret	3	10	2	4	7	6	8	9	8	8	6	4	2	1	10	8	6	Ret	Ret	Ret	93
9	(Monaco) Stéphane Ortelli	Peugeot	11	6	8	9	Ret	DNS	9	5	11	DNS	9	7	6	5	8	Ret	8	8	7	9	8	4	8	7	70
10	(France) Arnaud Trevisiol	BMW	7	Ret	12	4	10	9	11	10	8	8	DNS	DNS	7	6	12	Ret	9	9	9	10	11	Ret	6	6	42
11	(France) Fabien Giroix	SEAT	5	4	9	7	Ret	6	Ret	14	9	10	10	10	Ret	Ret	Ret	13	11	Ret	8	11	12	Ret	Ret	Ret	32
12	(France) Olivier Thévenin	SEAT	8	Ret	Ret	DNS	11	8	15	11	10	Ret	Ret	DNS	11	10	14	12	12	11	Ret	Ret	13	8	7	10	23
13	(Switzerland) Jean-Denis Délétraz	SEAT	9	5	11	8	Ret	DNS	10	Ret	Ret	Ret	11	11	Ret	DNS	11	11	Ret	10	12	15	15	Ret	Ret	8	19
14	(France) Michel Bandura	Peugeot	8	DNS		10		11		12		11	12	12	10			10		12	14		16			12	15
15	(France) Daniel Bandura	Peugeot	12		10		13		12		12					11	15		14			13		10	11		14
16	(France) Maurice Pérus	Ford; BMW; Opel	13	7	Ret	DNS	Ret	DNS	13	DNS	Ret	DNS	13	13			Ret	DNS	13	Ret	15	14			10	11	9
17	(France) Marc Sourd	Volkswagen					12	Ret	Ret	DNS	Ret	DNS	DNS	DNS			13	Ret	10	Ret	11	Ret	10	6	Ret	Ret	7
	(France) Jean-Claude Basso	BMW																									0
	(France) Olivier Couvreur	BMW																									0
	(France) William David	BMW																									0
	(France) Arnaud Duprey	BMW																									0
	(France) Jean-Pierre Large	BMW																									0
	(France) Michel Quagliozzi	Honda																									0
	(France) Bernard Thuner	Peugeot							14	9																	0
	(France) Gérard Tremblay	BMW																									0
Pos	Driver	Car	NOG (France)		MOC (France)		PAU (France)		DIJ (France)		CHA (France)		VGP (France)		CRT (France)		LCA (France)		ALB (France)		LMS (France)		LMO (France)		LED (France)		Pts

Colour	Result
Gold	Winner
Silver	Second place
Bronze	Third place
Green	Points classification
Blue	Non-points classification
Blue	Non-classified finish (NC)
Purple	Retired, not classified (Ret)
Red	Did not qualify (DNQ)
Red	Did not pre-qualify (DNPQ)
Black	Disqualified (DSQ)
White	Did not start (DNS)
White	Withdrew (WD)
White	Race cancelled (C)
Blank	Did not practice (DNP)
Blank	Did not arrive (DNA)
Blank	Excluded (EX)

**Bold** – Pole
Italics – Fastest Lap

=== Manufacturers' Trophy ===
Pos	Manufacturer	Points
1	(France) Peugeot	214
2	(Germany) Opel	177
3	(Germany) BMW	167
4	(United States) Ford	114
5	(Spain) SEAT	104
6	(Germany) Volkswagen	52
7	(Japan) Honda	4

=== Privateers' Championship ===
Pos	Driver	Manufacturer	Points
1	(France) Michel Bandura	Peugeot	231
2	(France) Daniel Bandura	Peugeot	210
3	(France) Maurice Pérus	Ford; BMW; Opel	156
4	(France) Gérard Tremblay	BMW	81
4	(France) Jean-Pierre Large	BMW	81
6	(France) Michel Quagliozzi	Honda	15
