= Éric Hélary =

French racing driver (born 1966)

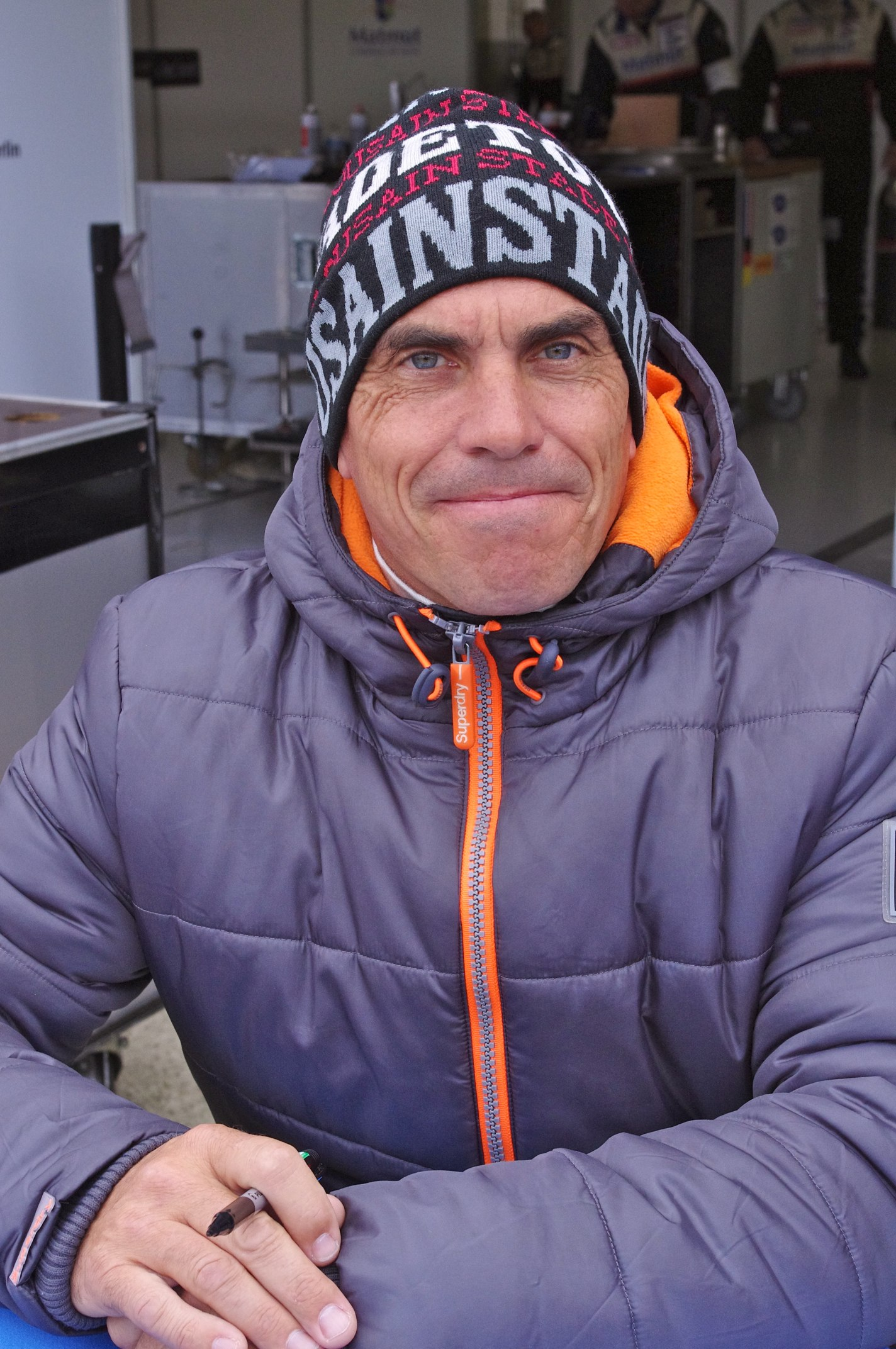
- Nationality: French
- Born: Éric Georges Roger Hélary; 10 August 1966 (age 60) Paris, France
- Categorisation: FIA Platinum (until 2016); FIA Gold (2017–2021); FIA Silver (2022–)

24 Hours of Le Mans career
- Years: 1993 - 1998, 2002 - 2003, 2005 - 2006, 2014
- Teams: Peugeot Talbot Sport, Michel Hommell, Courage Compétition, Viper Team Oreca, BMW Motorsport, Toyota Motorsport, Pescarolo Sport
- Best finish: 1st (1993)
- Class wins: 2 (1993, 1995)

Éric Georges Roger Hélary (born 10 August 1966) is a professional racing driver from Paris. His career has encompassed single seater formulae, endurance sports car racing, and touring cars. He won the French Formula Three Championship in 1990 and is best known for his win at the 24 Hours of Le Mans in 1993. He was champion 2011 of Euro Racecar.

== Single seater career ==
Hélary's racing career began in a conventional way, with a period of karting between 1981 and 1984. He progressed to French Formula Ford in 1987 and won the title in the following year, then progressed to French Formula Three in 1989 and won that title in his second year. His single seater career ended in International Formula 3000.

== Sports cars ==
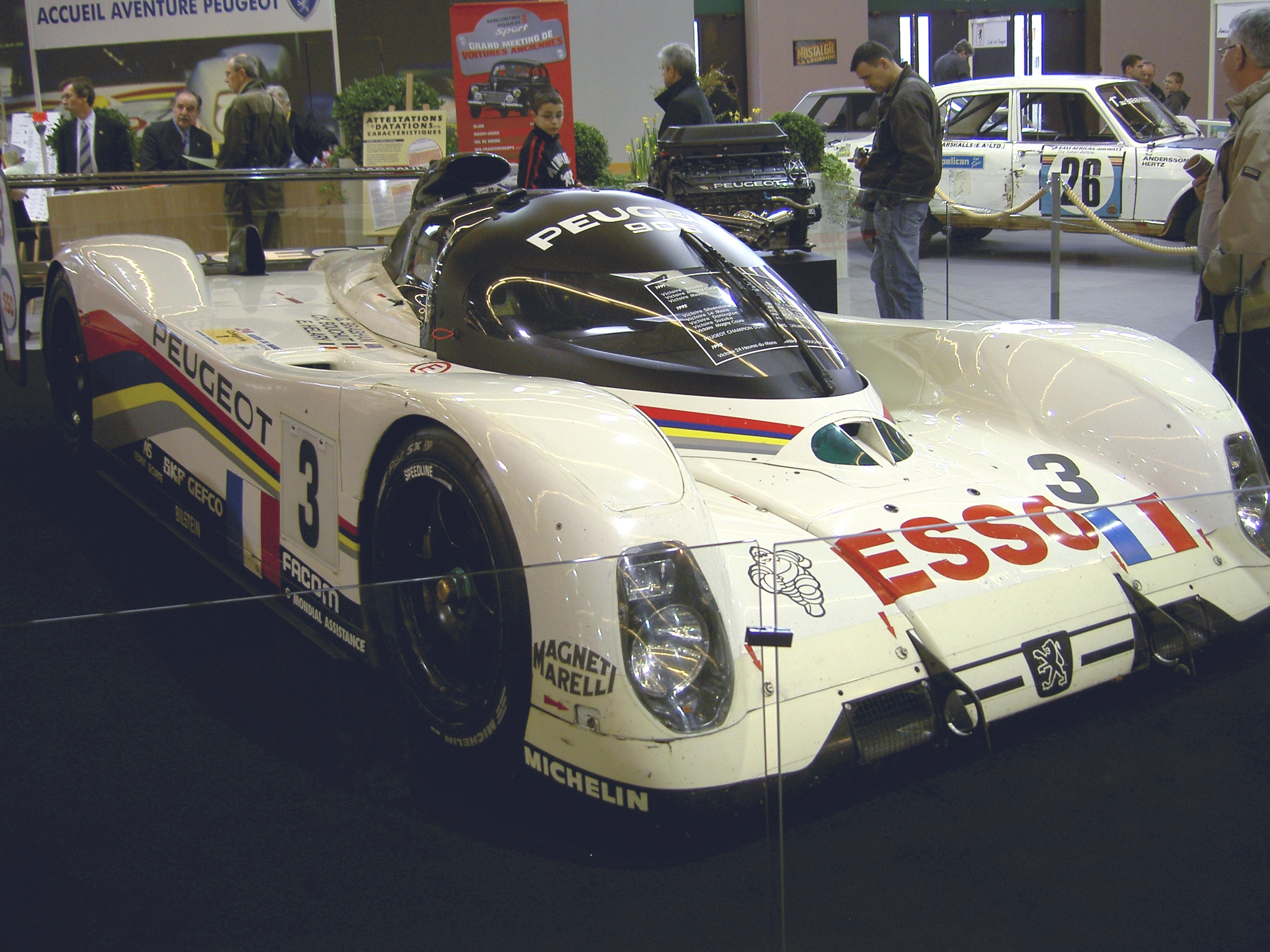
Hélary's Peugeot 905B

Hélary first participated in sports car racing in the Peugeot Spyder Cup one-make championship in 1992 and secured the drivers' title in 1993. In the same year, he made his 24 Hours of Le Mans début in the factory Peugeot 905 alongside Christophe Bouchut and Geoff Brabham. He had previously driven this car with Bouchut in 1992.

After a period in touring cars, Hélary returned to endurance racing in the FIA GT Championship in 1996, driving a Chrysler Viper. He did not compete again in sports cars until a one-off return to FIA GTs in 2001. His next participation in endurance racing was another single race, this time in the FIA Sportscar Championship in 2003, driving a Pescarolo Courage-Peugeot alongside Nicolas Minassian. Hélary made another one-off appearance with Pescarolo in the 2004 Le Mans Endurance Series and returned to the series for a full season in 2006. He is currently employed by Peugeot as its official test driver for the Peugeot 908 HDi FAP.

== Touring cars ==
Hélary made his touring car début in the French Supertourisme championship in 1994, driving for Opel. He was classified fifth in the standings and improved to the championship runner-up position in 1995. He made a departure into ice racing during the winter of 1996 by entering the Trophée Andros with Opel. He adapted well and finished in fourth position over all, then finished second over all in the 1997 season.

Hélary spent the remainder of 1997 working as a test driver for BMW's Super Tourenwagen Cup team in Germany and then returned to Opel for two years of racing in the series in 1998 and 1999. When the Deutsche Tourenwagen Masters was relaunched in 2000, Hélary and Opel remained together. He made one more appearance in the DTM in 2002 before returning to French Supertourisme for a third season, in which he finished fourth in the standings. A full season of sports car racing intervened before Hélary's next, and so far last, touring car programme. 2005 brought a fourth season in French Supertourisme as well as competing in one round of the World Touring Car Championship in a Peugeot 407 for Peugeot Sport Denmark.

== Racing record ==
=== Complete International Formula 3000 results ===
(key) (Races in bold indicate pole position) (Races in italics indicate fastest lap)

Year	Entrant	Chassis	Engine	1	2	3	4	5	6	7	8	9	10	DC	Points
1991	First Racing	Reynard	Ford Cosworth	VAL; 11	PAU; 3	JER; Ret	MUG; 16†	PER	HOC					9th	9
1991	CoBRa Motorsports	Reynard	Ford Cosworth							BRH; 15	SPA; 4	BUG; Ret	NOG; 5	9th	9
1992	DAMS	Lola T92/50	Ford Cosworth	SIL	PAU	CAT	PER	HOC	NÜR	SPA	ALB; Ret	NOG	MAG	NC	0

=== 24 Hours of Le Mans results ===
Year	Team	Co-Drivers	Car	Class	Laps	Pos.	Class Pos.
1993	(France) Peugeot Talbot Sport	(France) Christophe Bouchut (Australia) Geoff Brabham	Peugeot 905 Evo 1B	C1	375	**1st**	**1st**
1994	(France) Michel Hommel	(France) Alain Cudini (France) Jean-Christophe Boullion	Bugatti EB110 SS	GT1	230	DNF	DNF
1995	(France) Courage Compétition	(France) Bob Wollek (United States) Mario Andretti	Courage C34-Porsche	WSC	297	**2nd**	**1st**
1996	(France) Viper Team Oreca	(France) Philippe Gache (Monaco) Olivier Beretta	Chrysler Viper GTS-R	GT1	283	21st	12th
1997	(Germany) Team BMW Motorsport (Germany) BMW Team Schnitzer	(Netherlands) Peter Kox (Italy) Roberto Ravaglia	McLaren F1 GTR	GT1	358	**3rd**	**2nd**
1998	(Japan) Toyota Motorsports (Germany) Toyota Team Europe	(United Kingdom) Martin Brundle (France) Emmanuel Collard	Toyota GT-One	GT1	191	DNF	DNF
2002	(France) Pescarolo Sport	(France) Stéphane Ortelli (Japan) Ukyo Katayama	Courage C60-Peugeot	LMP900	144	DNF	DNF
2003	(France) Pescarolo Sport	(France) Nicolas Minassian (France) Soheil Ayari	Courage C60-Peugeot	LMP900	352	9th	7th
2005	(France) Pescarolo Sport	(France) Soheil Ayari (France) Sébastien Loeb	Pescarolo C60 Hybrid-Judd	LMP1	288	DNF	DNF
2006	(France) Pescarolo Sport	(France) Sébastien Loeb (France) Franck Montagny	Pescarolo C60 Hybrid-Judd	LMP1	376	**2nd**	**2nd**
2014	(France) IMSA Performance Matmut	(France) Erik Maris (France) Jean-Marc Merlin	Porsche 997 GT3-RSR	GTE; Am	317	34th	13th

=== Complete French Supertouring Championship results ===
(key)

Year	Team	Car	1	2	3	4	5	6	7	8	9	10	11	12	13	14	15	16	17	18	19	20	21	22	23	24	DC	Pts
1994	Opel France	Opel Vectra	NOG; 1 Ret	NOG; 2 DNS	MAG; 1; 13	MAG; 2; 6	PAU; 1; 7	PAU; 2; 4	DIJ; 1; 4	DIJ; 2; 2	CHA; 1 Ret	CHA; 2; 2	VDV; 1; 2	VDV; 2; 6	CET; 1; 12	CET; 2 DNS	LEC; 1; 5	LEC; 2; 7	ALB; 1 Ret	ALB; 2 Ret	BUG; 1; 3	BUG; 2; 2	DML; 1; 2	DML; 2; 2	LED; 1; 4	LED; 2 Ret	5th	125
1995	Opel France	Opel Vectra	NOG; 1; 5	NOG; 2 Ret	DIJ; 1; 2	DIJ; 2; 2	PAU; 1; 1	PAU; 2; 1	CHA; 1; 1	CHA; 2; 2	VDV; 1; 3	VDV; 2; 3	CET; 1; 2	CET; 2; 1	LEC; 1; 4	LEC; 2; 5	ALB; 1; 1	ALB; 2; 1	DML; 1; 2	DML; 2; 1							**2nd**	**128**

=== Complete Super Tourenwagen Cup results ===
(key) (Races in bold indicate pole position) (Races in italics indicate fastest lap)

Year	Team	Car	1	2	3	4	5	6	7	8	9	10	11	12	13	14	15	16	17	18	19	20	DC	Pts
1998	TNT Team SMS	Opel Vectra	HOC; 1 Ret	HOC; 2; 9	NÜR; 1; 2	NÜR; 2; 2	SAC; 1; 19	SAC; 2; 7	NOR; 1; 7	NOR; 2; 2	LAH; 1; 2	LAH; 2; 3	WUN; 1; 7	WUN; 2; 4	ZWE; 1; 8	ZWE; 2; 4	SAL; 1 Ret	SAL; 2 DNS	OSC; 1; 9	OSC; 2; 6	NÜR; 1; 2	NÜR; 2; 1	4th	473
1999	TNT Team Holzer	Opel Vectra	SAC; 1; 6	SAC; 2 Ret	ZWE; 1; 4	ZWE; 2; 6	OSC; 1; 8	OSC; 2; 7	NOR; 1; 3	NOR; 2; 6	MIS; 1; 14	MIS; 2; 5	NÜR; 1 Ret	NÜR; 2 Ret	SAL; 1; 2	SAL; 2; 9	OSC; 1; 2	OSC; 2; 1	HOC; 1 Ret	HOC; 2; 10	NÜR; 1; 6	NÜR; 2 Ret	8th	361

=== Complete Deutsche Tourenwagen Masters results ===
(key)

Year	Team	Car	1	2	3	4	5	6	7	8	9	10	11	12	13	14	15	16	17	18	19	20	Pos.	Pts
2000	Opel Team Holzer 2	Opel Astra V8 Coupé	HOC; 1 Ret	HOC; 2; 7	OSC; 1; 4	OSC; 2; 10	NOR; 1; 15	NOR; 2; 15	SAC; 1; 4	SAC; 2; 16†	NÜR; 1; 8	NÜR; 2; 7	LAU; 1 C	LAU; 2 C	OSC; 1; 4	OSC; 2; 10	NÜR; 1; 14	NÜR; 2 Ret	HOC; 1; 6	HOC; 2; 7			9th	53
2002	OPC Euroteam	Opel Astra V8 Coupé 2001	HOC; QR	HOC; CR	ZOL; QR	ZOL; CR	DON; QR	DON; CR	SAC; QR	SAC; CR	NOR; QR	NOR; CR	LAU; QR	LAU; CR	NÜR; QR	NÜR; CR	A1R; QR	A1R; CR	ZAN; QR; 16	ZAN; CR; 14	HOC; QR	HOC; CR	24th	0

- † — Retired, but was classified as he completed 90% of the winner's race distance.

=== Complete World Touring Car Championship results ===
(key) (Races in bold indicate pole position) (Races in italics indicate fastest lap)

Year	Team	Car	1	2	3	4	5	6	7	8	9	10	11	12	13	14	15	16	17	18	19	20	DC	Points
2005	Peugeot Sport Denmark	Peugeot 407	ITA; 1	ITA; 2	FRA; 1	FRA; 2	GBR; 1	GBR; 2	SMR; 1	SMR; 2	MEX; 1	MEX; 2	BEL; 1	BEL; 2	GER; 1 Ret	GER; 2 DNS	TUR; 1	TUR; 2	ESP; 1	ESP; 2	MAC; 1	MAC; 2	NC	0

=== NASCAR ===
(key) (Bold – Pole position awarded by qualifying time. Italics – Pole position earned by points standings or practice time. * – Most laps led.)

==== K&N Pro Series East ====
NASCAR K&N Pro Series East results
Year	Team	No.	Make	1	2	3	4	5	6	7	8	9	10	11	12	13	14	NKNPSEC	Pts	Ref
2012	Euro-RaceCar NASCAR Touring	61	Chevy	BRI	GRE	RCH	IOW	BGS	JFC	LGY	CNB	COL	IOW	NHA; DNQ	DOV	GRE	CAR	N/A	-	

==== Whelen Euro Series - Elite 1 ====
NASCAR Whelen Euro Series - Elite 1 results
Year	Team	No.	Make	1	2	3	4	5	6	7	8	9	10	11	12	NWES	Pts	Ref
2013	Still Racing	100	Chevy	NOG	NOG	DIJ	DIJ	BRH	BRH	TOU; 19	TOU; 10	MNZ	MNZ	LEM	LEM	36th	?	
2017	Alex Caffi Motorsport	27	Ford	VAL	VAL	BRH	BRH	VEN	VEN	HOC	HOC	FRA	FRA	ZOL; 14	ZOL; 9	35th	60	

Sporting positions
Preceded by Jean-Marc Gounon	French Formula Three Champion; 1990	Succeeded by Christophe Bouchut
Preceded by Derek Warwick; Yannick Dalmas; Mark Blundell	Winner of the 24 Hours of Le Mans; 1993 with: Geoff Brabham; Christophe Bouchut	Succeeded by Yannick Dalmas; Hurley Haywood; Mauro Baldi
