= 1995 FIA Touring Car World Cup =

Seasons
- ← 1994 none →

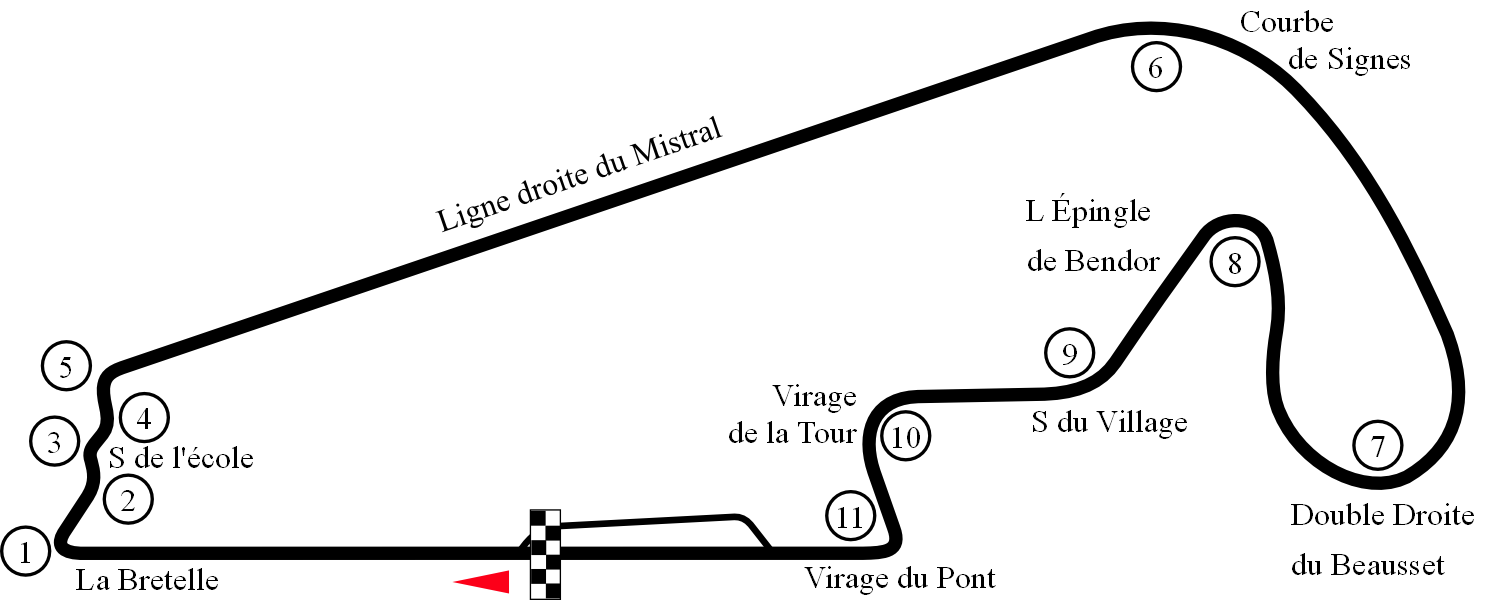
Layout of the Circuit Paul Ricard short circuit (1986–2001)

The 1995 FIA Touring Car World Cup was the third and final running of the FIA Touring Car World Cup. It was held on 15 October 1995 at the Circuit Paul Ricard in France. Frank Biela won the event overall with a win and a second place in the two races, with Audi and BMW cars dominating both races.

== Entry list ==
No	Driver	Entrant	Car	1995 Championship
1	(Germany) Roland Asch	Ford Team Eggenberger	Ford Mondeo	Super Tourenwagen Cup
2	(Czech Republic) Vaclav Bervid	Bervid Sport Styling	BMW 318iS	Czech Republic Touring Car Championship
3	(Germany) Frank Biela	Racing Organisation Course	Audi A4	Super Tourenwagen Cup
4	(Belgium) Thierry Boutsen	Ford Team Schubel	Ford Mondeo	Super Tourenwagen Cup
5	(Australia) David Brabham	BMW Motorsport	BMW 318iS	British Touring Car Championship
6	(South Africa) Michael Briggs	Opel Racing	Opel Vectra	South African Touring Car Championship
7	(United Kingdom) Kelvin Burt	Valvoline Team Mondeo	Ford Mondeo	British Touring Car Championship
8	(Czech Republic) Milos Bychl	BMW Team Bychl	BMW 318iS	Czech Republic Touring Car Championship
9	(Italy) Rinaldo Capello	Audi Sport Italia	Audi A4	Italian Superturismo Championship
10	(Venezuela) Johnny Cecotto	BMW Motorsport	BMW 318iS	British Touring Car Championship
11	(United Kingdom) John Cleland	Vauxhall Sport	Vauxhall Cavalier	British Touring Car Championship
12	(Italy) Roberto Colciago	RC Motorsport	Opel Vectra	Italian Superturismo Championship
13	(France) Alain Cudini	Opel France	Opel Vectra	French Supertouring Championship
14	(Germany) Armin Hahne	Honda Team Linder	Honda Accord	Super Tourenwagen Cup
15	(United Kingdom) Tim Harvey	Volvo 850 Racing	Volvo 850	British Touring Car Championship
16	(Switzerland) Johnny Hauser	Ford Team Eggenberger	Ford Mondeo	Super Tourenwagen Cup
17	(France) Éric Hélary	Opel France	Opel Vectra	French Supertouring Championship
18	(United Kingdom) Will Hoy	Renault Dealer Racing	Renault Laguna	British Touring Car Championship
19	(Czech Republic) Josef Kopecky	Motorsport Kopecky	Ford Mondeo	Czech Republic Touring Car Championship
20	(Netherlands) Peter Kox	BMW Motorsport Team Schnitzer	BMW 318iS	Super Tourenwagen Cup
21	(Czech Republic) Otakar Kramsky	Autosport Kramsky	BMW 318iS	Czech Republic Touring Car Championship
22	(United Kingdom) David Leslie	Honda Team MSD	Honda Accord	British Touring Car Championship
23	(Germany) Sascha Maassen	Nissan Primera Racing	Nissan Primera	Super Tourenwagen Cup
24	(Switzerland) Alain Menu	Renault Dealer Racing	Renault Laguna	British Touring Car Championship
25	(Czech Republic) Josef Michl	Michl Motorsport	BMW 318iS	Czech Republic Touring Car Championship
26	(France) Yvan Muller	BMW Team Fina	BMW 318iS	French Supertouring Championship
27	(Italy) Emanuele Naspetti	BMW Italia	BMW 318iS	Italian Superturismo Championship
28	(United Kingdom) Matt Neal	Team Dynamics	Ford Mondeo	British Touring Car Championship
29	(Germany) Klaus Niedzwiedz	Honda Team Linder	Honda Accord	Super Tourenwagen Cup
30	(Spain) Luis Pérez-Sala	Team Repsol Nissan	Nissan Primera	Spanish Touring Car Championship
31	(Italy) Emanuele Pirro	Audi Sport Italia	Audi A4	Italian Superturismo Championship
32	(New Zealand) Paul Radisich	Valvoline Team Mondeo	Ford Mondeo	British Touring Car Championship
33	(Italy) Roberto Ravaglia	BMW Motorsport Team Bigazzi	BMW 318iS	Super Tourenwagen Cup
34	(United Kingdom) Anthony Reid	Opel Japan	Opel Vectra	Japanese Touring Car Championship
35	(Sweden) Rickard Rydell	Volvo 850 Racing	Volvo 850	British Touring Car Championship
36	(United Kingdom) Steve Soper	BMW Motorsport Team Bigazzi	BMW 318iS	Japanese Touring Car Championship
37	(Germany) Hans-Joachim Stuck	AZK Team Schneider	Audi A4	Super Tourenwagen Cup
38	(Italy) Gabriele Tarquini	Alfa Corse	Alfa Romeo 155	Italian Superturismo Championship
39	(Belgium) Eric van de Poele	Team Repsol Nissan	Nissan Primera	Spanish Touring Car Championship
40	(Germany) Joachim Winkelhock	BMW Motorsport Team Schnitzer	BMW 318iS	Super Tourenwagen Cup

== Results ==
=== Qualifying ===
Qualifying 1

Pos	No	Driver	Car	Lap Time	Gap
1	31	(Italy) Emanuele Pirro	Audi A4 Quattro	1:27.478	
2	3	(Germany) Frank Biela	Audi A4 Quattro	1:27.483	+0.005
3	37	(Germany) Hans Joachim Stuck	Audi A4 Quattro	1:27.540	+0.062
4	36	(United Kingdom) Steve Soper	BMW 318iS	1:27.671	+0.193
5	10	(Venezuela) Johnny Cecotto	BMW 318iS	1:27.772	+0.294
6	26	(France) Yvan Muller	BMW 318iS	1:27.946	+0.468
7	24	(Switzerland) Alain Menu	Renault Laguna	1:28.007	+0.529
8	33	(Italy) Roberto Ravaglia	BMW 318iS	1:28.035	+0.557
9	9	(Italy) Rinaldo Capello	Audi A4 Quattro	1:28.228	+0.750
10	35	(Sweden) Rickard Rydell	Volvo 850 GLT	1:28.290	+0.812
11	7	(United Kingdom) Kelvin Burt	Ford Mondeo Ghia	1:28.488	+1.010
12	5	(Australia) David Brabham	BMW 318iS	1:28.560	+1.082
13	40	(Germany) Joachim Winkelhock	BMW 318iS	1:28.581	+1.103
14	11	(United Kingdom) John Cleland	Opel Vectra GT	1:28.627	+1.149
15	1	(Germany) Roland Asch	Ford Mondeo Ghia	1:28.673	+1.195
16	29	(Germany) Klaus Niedzwiedz	Honda Accord	1:28.734	+1.256
17	17	(France) Éric Hélary	Opel Vectra GT	1:28.761	+1.283
18	18	(United Kingdom) Will Hoy	Renault Laguna	1:28.791	+1.313
19	34	(United Kingdom) Anthony Reid	Opel Vectra GT	1:28.807	+1.329
20	22	(United Kingdom) David Leslie	Honda Accord	1:28.913	+1.435
21	30	(Spain) Luis Perez Sala	Nissan Primera GTE	1:28.945	+1.467
22	32	(New Zealand) Paul Radisich	Ford Mondeo Ghia	1:28.962	+1.484
23	13	(France) Alain Cudini	Opel Vectra GT	1:28.992	+1.514
24	14	(Germany) Armin Hahne	Honda Accord	1:29.015	+1.537
25	38	(Italy) Gabriele Tarquini	Alfa Romeo 155 TS	1:29.038	+1.560
26	15	(United Kingdom) Tim Harvey	Volvo 850 GLT	1:29.062	+1.584
27	20	(Netherlands) Peter Kox	BMW 318iS	1:29.109	+1.631
28	6	(South Africa) Michael Briggs	Opel Vectra GT	1:29.243	+1.765
29	39	(Belgium) Eric van de Poele	Nissan Primera GTE	1:29.252	+1.774
30	23	(Germany) Sascha Maassen	Nissan Primera GTE	1:29.424	+1.946
31	28	(United Kingdom) Matt Neal	Ford Mondeo Ghia	1:29.521	+2.043
32	16	(Switzerland) Johnny Hauser	Ford Mondeo Ghia	1:29.582	+2.104
33	12	(Italy) Roberto Colciago	Opel Vectra GT	1:30.664	+3.186
34	4	(Belgium) Thierry Boutsen	Ford Mondeo 4x4	1:30.682	+3.204
35	19	(Czech Republic) Josef Kopecky	Ford Mondeo Ghia	1:31.054	+3.576
36	2	(Czech Republic) Vaclav Bervid	BMW 318iS	1:31.301	+3.823
37	8	(Czech Republic) Milos Bychl	BMW 318iS	1:31.917	+4.439
38	25	(Czech Republic) Josef Michl	BMW 318iS	1:37.233	+9.755
39	21	(Czech Republic) Otakar Kramsky	BMW 318iS	No Time	—

Qualifying 2

Pos	No	Driver	Car	Lap Time	Gap
1	31	(Italy) Emanuele Pirro	Audi A4 Quattro	1:27.319	
2	37	(Germany) Hans Joachim Stuck	Audi A4 Quattro	1:27.521	+0.202
3	3	(Germany) Frank Biela	Audi A4 Quattro	1:27.536	+0.217
4	36	(United Kingdom) Steve Soper	BMW 318iS	1:27.602	+0.283
5	10	(Venezuela) Johnny Cecotto	BMW 318iS	1:27.727	+0.408
6	26	(France) Yvan Muller	BMW 318iS	1:27.762	+0.443
7	33	(Italy) Roberto Ravaglia	BMW 318iS	1:27.812	+0.493
8	34	(United Kingdom) Anthony Reid	Opel Vectra GT	1:27.987	+0.668
9	9	(Italy) Rinaldo Capello	Audi A4 Quattro	1:28.008	+0.689
10	24	(Switzerland) Alain Menu	Renault Laguna	1:28.011	+0.692
11	35	(Sweden) Rickard Rydell	Volvo 850 GLT	1:28.256	+0.937
12	40	(Germany) Joachim Winkelhock	BMW 318iS	1:28.266	+0.947
13	22	(United Kingdom) David Leslie	Honda Accord	1:28.331	+1.012
14	5	(Australia) David Brabham	BMW 318iS	1:28.362	+1.043
15	38	(Italy) Gabriele Tarquini	Alfa Romeo 155 TS	1:28.418	+1.099
16	20	(Netherlands) Peter Kox	BMW 318iS	1:28.519	+1.200
17	18	(United Kingdom) Will Hoy	Renault Laguna	1:28.530	+1.211
18	11	(United Kingdom) John Cleland	Opel Vectra GT	1:28.628	+1.309
19	29	(Germany) Klaus Niedzwiedz	Honda Accord	1:28.648	+1.329
20	7	(United Kingdom) Kelvin Burt	Ford Mondeo Ghia	1:28.695	+1.376
21	17	(France) Éric Hélary	Opel Vectra GT	1:28.695	+1.376
22	32	(New Zealand) Paul Radisich	Ford Mondeo Ghia	1:28.772	+1.453
23	14	(Germany) Armin Hahne	Honda Accord	1:28.775	+1.456
24	30	(Spain) Luis Perez Sala	Nissan Primera GTE	1:28.785	+1.466
25	15	(United Kingdom) Tim Harvey	Volvo 850 GLT	1:28.838	+1.519
26	1	(Germany) Roland Asch	Ford Mondeo Ghia	1:28.872	+1.553
27	6	(South Africa) Michael Briggs	Opel Vectra GT	1:28.990	+1.671
28	13	(France) Alain Cudini	Opel Vectra GT	1:29.210	+1.891
29	16	(Switzerland) Johnny Hauser	Ford Mondeo Ghia	1:29.216	+1.897
30	23	(Germany) Sascha Maassen	Nissan Primera GTE	1:29.263	+1.944
31	39	(Belgium) Eric van de Poele	Nissan Primera GTE	1:29.358	+2.039
32	28	(United Kingdom) Matt Neal	Ford Mondeo Ghia	1:29.418	+2.099
33	12	(Italy) Roberto Colciago	Opel Vectra GT	1:29.617	+2.298
34	4	(Belgium) Thierry Boutsen	Ford Mondeo 4x4	1:30.370	+3.051
35	19	(Czech Republic) Josef Kopecky	Ford Mondeo Ghia	1:30.858	+3.539
36	2	(Czech Republic) Vaclav Bervid	BMW 318iS	1:31.525	+4.206
37	8	(Czech Republic) Milos Bychl	BMW 318iS	1:31.750	+4.431
38	21	(Czech Republic) Otakar Kramsky	BMW 318iS	1:32.962	+5.643
39	25	(Czech Republic) Josef Michl	BMW 318iS	1:35.316	+7.997

=== Races ===
Race 1

Pos	No	Driver	Constructor	Laps	Time/Retired	Grid	Points
1	3	(Germany) Frank Biela	Audi A4 Quattro	26	39:02.263	2	40
2	36	(United Kingdom) Steve Soper	BMW 318iS	26	+ 4.911	4	30
3	26	(France) Yvan Muller	BMW 318iS	26	+ 14.209	6	24
4	10	(Venezuela) Johnny Cecotto	BMW 318iS	26	+ 17.665	5	20
5	37	(Germany) Hans Joachim Stuck	Audi A4 Quattro	26	+ 18.068	3	16
6	7	(United Kingdom) Kelvin Burt	Ford Mondeo Ghia	26	+ 25.134	11	15
7	31	(Italy) Emanuele Pirro	Audi A4 Quattro	26	+ 27.274	1	14
8	40	(Germany) Joachim Winkelhock	BMW 318iS	26	+ 32.785	13	13
9	5	(Australia) David Brabham	BMW 318iS	26	+ 33.381	12	12
10	35	(Sweden) Rickard Rydell	Volvo 850 GLT	26	+ 47.999	10	11
11	14	(Germany) Armin Hahne	Honda Accord	26	+ 49.075	24	10
12	29	(Germany) Klaus Niedzwiedz	Honda Accord	26	+ 50.025	16	9
13	13	(France) Alain Cudini	Opel Vectra GT	26	+ 51.288	23	8
14	33	(Italy) Roberto Ravaglia	BMW 318iS	26	+ 57.504	8	7
15	20	(Netherlands) Peter Kox	BMW 318iS	26	+ 1:06.386	27	6
16	11	(United Kingdom) John Cleland	Opel Vectra GT	26	+ 1:09.099	14	5
17	1	(Germany) Roland Asch	Ford Mondeo Ghia	26	+ 1:13.614	15	4
18	15	(United Kingdom) Tim Harvey	Volvo 850 GLT	26	+ 1:15.097	26	3
19	16	(Switzerland) Johnny Hauser	Ford Mondeo Ghia	26	+ 1:17.101	32	2
20	6	(South Africa) Michael Briggs	Opel Vectra GT	26	+ 1:18.342	28	1
21	39	(Belgium) Eric van de Poele	Nissan Primera GTE	26	+ 1:24.872	29	
22	23	(Germany) Sascha Maassen	Nissan Primera GTE	26	+ 1:33.620	30	
23	12	(Italy) Roberto Colciago	Opel Vectra GT	25	+ 1 Lap	33	
24	19	(Czech Republic) Josef Kopecky	Ford Mondeo Ghia	25	+ 1 Lap	35	
25	8	(Czech Republic) Milos Bychl	BMW 318iS	25	+ 1 Lap	37	
26	2	(Czech Republic) Vaclav Bervid	BMW 318iS	25	+ 1 Lap	36	
27	30	(Spain) Luis Perez Sala	Nissan Primera GTE	25	+ 1 Lap	21	
28	21	(Czech Republic) Otakar Kramsky	BMW 318iS	25	+ 1 Lap	39	
29	4	(Belgium) Thierry Boutsen	Ford Mondeo 4x4	24	+ 2 Laps	34	
Ret	17	(France) Éric Hélary	Opel Vectra GT	22	+ 4 Laps	17	
Ret	22	(United Kingdom) David Leslie	Honda Accord	20	+ 6 Laps	20	
Ret	32	(New Zealand) Paul Radisich	Ford Mondeo Ghia	19	+ 7 Laps	22	
Ret	38	(Italy) Gabriele Tarquini	Alfa Romeo 155 TS	17	+ 9 Laps	25	
Ret	28	(United Kingdom) Matt Neal	Ford Mondeo Ghia	13	+ 13 Laps	31	
Ret	34	(United Kingdom) Anthony Reid	Opel Vectra GT	12	+ 14 Laps	19	
Ret	24	(Switzerland) Alain Menu	Renault Laguna	10	+ 16 Laps	7	
Ret	9	(Italy) Rinaldo Capello	Audi A4 Quattro	9	+ 17 Laps	9	
Ret	18	(United Kingdom) Will Hoy	Renault Laguna	1	+ 25 Laps	18	
Ret	25	(Czech Republic) Josef Michl	BMW 318iS	1	+ 25 Laps	38	

Race 2

Pos	No	Driver	Constructor	Laps	Time/Retired	Grid	Points
1	31	(Italy) Emanuele Pirro	Audi A4 Quattro	26	39:11.167	1	40
2	3	(Germany) Frank Biela	Audi A4 Quattro	26	+ 2.211	3	30
3	36	(United Kingdom) Steve Soper	BMW 318iS	26	+ 3.570	4	24
4	26	(France) Yvan Muller	BMW 318iS	26	+ 6.554	6	20
5	24	(Switzerland) Alain Menu	Renault Laguna	26	+ 13.294	10	16
6	10	(Venezuela) Johnny Cecotto	BMW 318iS	26	+ 16.405	5	15
7	9	(Italy) Rinaldo Capello	Audi A4 Quattro	26	+ 16.864	9	14
8	29	(Germany) Klaus Niedzwiedz	Honda Accord	26	+ 37.745	19	13
9	14	(Germany) Armin Hahne	Honda Accord	26	+ 38.697	23	12
10	34	(United Kingdom) Anthony Reid	Opel Vectra GT	26	+ 44.935	8	11
11	38	(Italy) Gabriele Tarquini	Alfa Romeo 155 TS	26	+ 47.926	15	10
12	1	(Germany) Roland Asch	Ford Mondeo Ghia	26	+ 49.294	26	9
13	7	(United Kingdom) Kelvin Burt	Ford Mondeo Ghia	26	+ 49.459	20	8
14	18	(United Kingdom) Will Hoy	Renault Laguna	26	+ 53.233	17	7
15	28	(United Kingdom) Matt Neal	Ford Mondeo Ghia	26	+ 1:01.053	32	6
16	39	(Belgium) Eric van de Poele	Nissan Primera GTE	26	+ 1:02.313	31	5
17	32	(New Zealand) Paul Radisich	Ford Mondeo Ghia	26	+ 1:12.131	22	4
18	23	(Germany) Sascha Maassen	Nissan Primera GTE	26	+ 1:22.822	30	3
19	12	(Italy) Roberto Colciago	Opel Vectra GT	26	+ 1:23.183	33	2
20	15	(United Kingdom) Tim Harvey	Volvo 850 GLT	26	+ 1:39.995	25	1
21	2	(Czech Republic) Vaclav Bervid	BMW 318iS	25	+ 1 Lap	36	
22	8	(Czech Republic) Milos Bychl	BMW 318iS	25	+ 1 Lap	37	
23	19	(Czech Republic) Josef Kopecky	Ford Mondeo Ghia	25	+ 1 Lap	35	
24	21	(Czech Republic) Otakar Kramsky	BMW 318iS	25	+ 1 Lap	38	
25	4	(Belgium) Thierry Boutsen	Ford Mondeo 4x4	24	+ 2 Laps	34	
Ret	30	(Spain) Luis Perez Sala	Nissan Primera GTE	19	+ 7 Laps	24	
Ret	16	(Switzerland) Johnny Hauser	Ford Mondeo Ghia	16	+ 10 Laps	29	
Ret	13	(France) Alain Cudini	Opel Vectra GT	16	+ 10 Laps	28	
Ret	33	(Italy) Roberto Ravaglia	BMW 318iS	10	+ 16 Laps	7	
Ret	6	(South Africa) Michael Briggs	Opel Vectra GT	9	+ 17 Laps	27	
Ret	20	(Netherlands) Peter Kox	BMW 318iS	8	+ 18 Laps	16	
Ret	35	(Sweden) Rickard Rydell	Volvo 850 GLT	7	+ 19 Laps	11	
Ret	11	(United Kingdom) John Cleland	Opel Vectra GT	6	+ 20 Laps	18	
Ret	17	(France) Éric Hélary	Opel Vectra GT	3	+ 23 Laps	21	
Ret	37	(Germany) Hans Joachim Stuck	Audi A4 Quattro	2	+ 25 Laps	2	
Ret	22	(United Kingdom) David Leslie	Honda Accord	0	+ 26 Laps	13	
Ret	25	(Czech Republic) Josef Michl	BMW 318iS	0	+ 26 Laps	38	
Ret	40	(Germany) Joachim Winkelhock	BMW 318iS	0	+ 26 Laps	12	
Ret	5	(Australia) David Brabham	BMW 318iS	0	+ 26 Laps	14	

== Championship standings ==
Scoring system

Points system
**1st**	**2nd**	**3rd**	**4th**	**5th**	**6th**	**7th**	**8th**	**9th**	**10th**	**11th**	**12th**	**13th**	**14th**	**15th**	**16th**	**17th**	**18th**	**19th**	**20th**
40	30	24	20	16	15	14	13	12	11	10	9	8	7	6	5	4	3	2	1

=== Drivers' standings ===
Pos	Driver	Race 1	Race 2	Pts
1	(Germany) Frank Biela	1	2	70
2	(Italy) Emanuele Pirro	**7**	**1**	54
3	(United Kingdom) Steve Soper	2	3	54
4	(France) Yvan Muller	3	4	44
5	(Venezuela) Johnny Cecotto	4	6	35
6	(United Kingdom) Kelvin Burt	6	13	23
7	(Germany) Klaus Niedzwiedz	12	8	22
8	(Germany) Armin Hahne	11	9	22
9	(Germany) Hans-Joachim Stuck	5	Ret	16
	(Switzerland) Alain Menu	Ret	5	16
11	(Italy) Rinaldo Capello	Ret	7	14
12	(Germany) Joachim Winkelhock	8	Ret	13
13	(Germany) Roland Asch	17	12	13
14	(Australia) David Brabham	9	Ret	12
15	(Sweden) Rickard Rydell	10	Ret	11
	(United Kingdom) Anthony Reid	Ret	10	11
17	(Italy) Gabriele Tarquini	Ret	11	10
18	(France) Alain Cudini	13	Ret	8
19	(Italy) Roberto Ravaglia	14	Ret	7
	(United Kingdom) Will Hoy	Ret	14	7
21	(Netherlands) Peter Kox	15	Ret	6
	(United Kingdom) Matt Neal	Ret	15	6
23	(Belgium) Eric van de Poele	21	16	5
24	(United Kingdom) John Cleland	16	Ret	5
25	(New Zealand) Paul Radisich	Ret	17	4
26	(United Kingdom) Tim Harvey	18	20	4
27	(Germany) Sascha Maassen	22	18	3
28	(Italy) Roberto Colciago	23	19	2
29	(Switzerland) Johnny Hauser	19	Ret	2
30	(South Africa) Michael Briggs	20	Ret	1
31	(Czech Republic) Vaclav Bervid	26	21	
32	(Czech Republic) Milos Bychl	25	22	
33	(Czech Republic) Josef Kopecky	24	23	
34	(Czech Republic) Otakar Kramsky	28	24	
35	(Belgium) Thierry Boutsen	29	25	
36	(Spain) Luis Pérez-Sala	27	Ret	
–	(France) Éric Hélary	Ret	Ret	
–	(United Kingdom) David Leslie	Ret	Ret	
–	(Czech Republic) Josef Michl	Ret	Ret	
–	(Italy) Emanuele Naspetti	DNS	DNS	
Pos	Driver	Race 1	Race 2	Pts

Colour	Result
Gold	Winner
Silver	Second place
Bronze	Third place
Green	Points classification
Blue	Non-points classification
Blue	Non-classified finish (NC)
Purple	Retired, not classified (Ret)
Red	Did not qualify (DNQ)
Red	Did not pre-qualify (DNPQ)
Black	Disqualified (DSQ)
White	Did not start (DNS)
White	Withdrew (WD)
White	Race cancelled (C)
Blank	Did not practice (DNP)
Blank	Did not arrive (DNA)
Blank	Excluded (EX)

**Bold** – Pole
Italics – Fastest Lap

=== Manufacturers' Trophy ===
Pos	Manufacturer	Race 1	Race 2	Points
1	(Germany) Audi	56	70	126
2	(Germany) BMW	54	44	98
3	(Japan) Honda	21	23	44
4	(United States) Ford	19	17	36
5	(France) Renault	-	23	23
6	(Germany) Opel	5	11	16
7	(Sweden) Volvo	14	1	15
8	(Italy) Alfa Romeo	-	10	10
9	(Japan) Nissan	-	8	8

Manufactures Points System

- Top two best results of every Manufactures for each race.
