= Matt Neal =

British racing driver (born 1966)

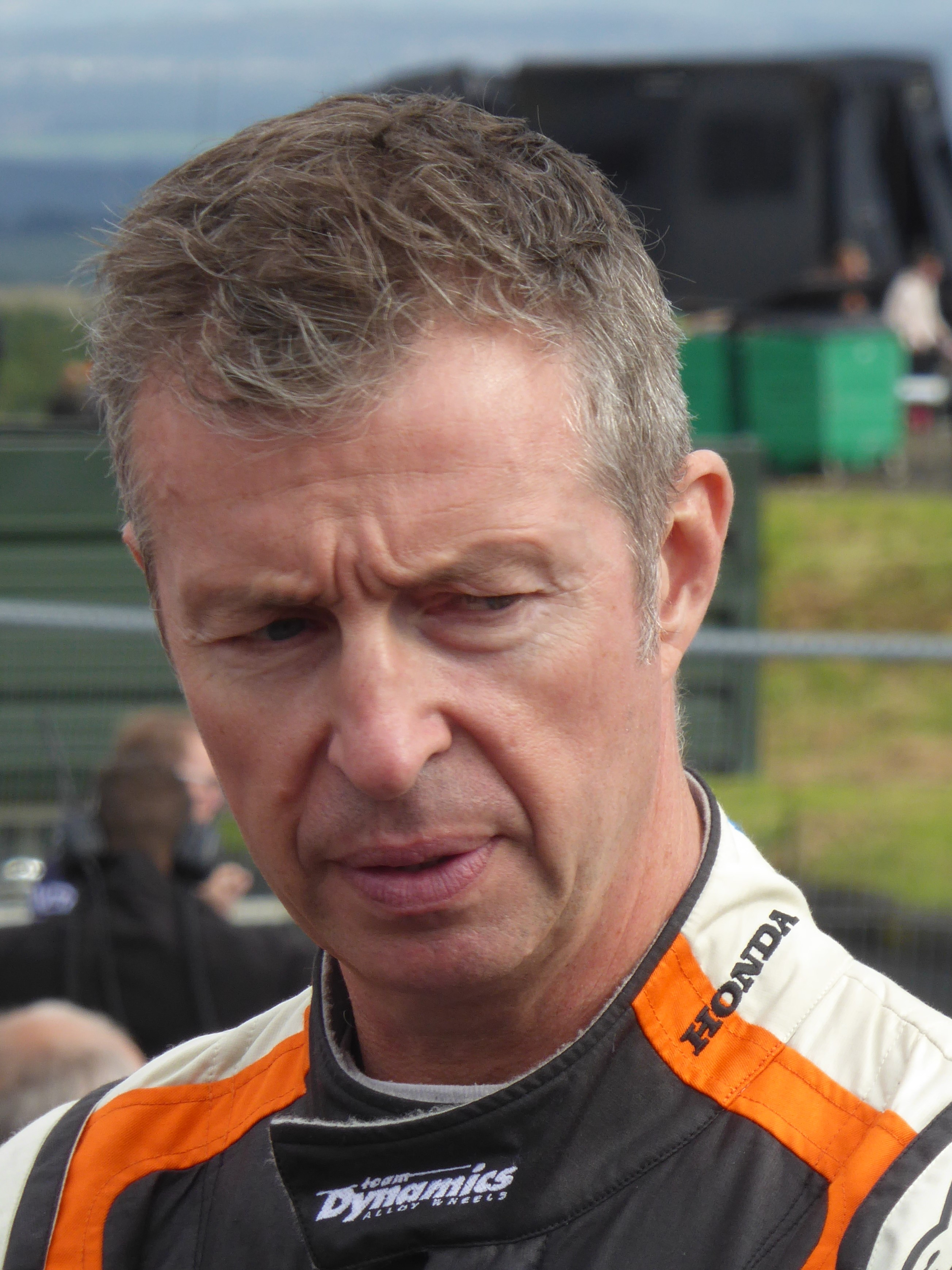
- Neal at the Knockhill round of the 2017 British Touring Car Championship
- Nationality: British
- Born: Matthew Stephen Phillip Neal; 20 December 1966 (age 59) Stourbridge, England

British Touring Car Championship career
- Debut season: 1991
- Current team: Halfords Yuasa Racing
- Categorisation: FIA Gold (until 2021); FIA Silver (2022–)
- Car number: 25
- Former teams: VX Racing; Peugeot Sport UK; Team Mazda; Tech-Speed Motorsport; Pyramid Motorsport
- Starts: 719
- Wins: 63
- Poles: 17
- Fastest laps: 52
- Best finish: 1st in 2005, 2006, 2011

Previous series
- 2018 2002 2001 1998 1993: Mini Challenge UK; ASCAR; ETCC; British GT Championship; DTM

Championship titles
- 2005–06, 2011: BTCC

Awards
- BRDC Silver Star

Matthew Stephen Phillip Neal (born 20 December 1966) is a British motor racing driver. Neal is a triple BTCC Champion having won the British Touring Car Championship in 2005, 2006 and 2011. Neal is also a record 6 time BTCC Independents Champion having won the title in 1993, 1995, 1999, 2000, 2005 and 2006. He is also a race winner in the European Touring Car Championship. He is 6 ft 6 in (1.98 m) tall, making him almost entirely unable to race single-seaters. He is also the Group Marketing Director at Rimstock, the alloy wheel manufacturer founded by his father Steve.

== Career ==
=== Early years ===
Born in Stourbridge, Neal started out in Motocross but moved into cars in 1988, driving in the Ford Fiesta XR2i category. He was the British Group N Champion in 1990 and 1991. He also co-drove a BMW M3 to victory at the 1990 Willhire 24 Hour race at Snetterton.

=== British Touring Car Championship (1991–2001) ===
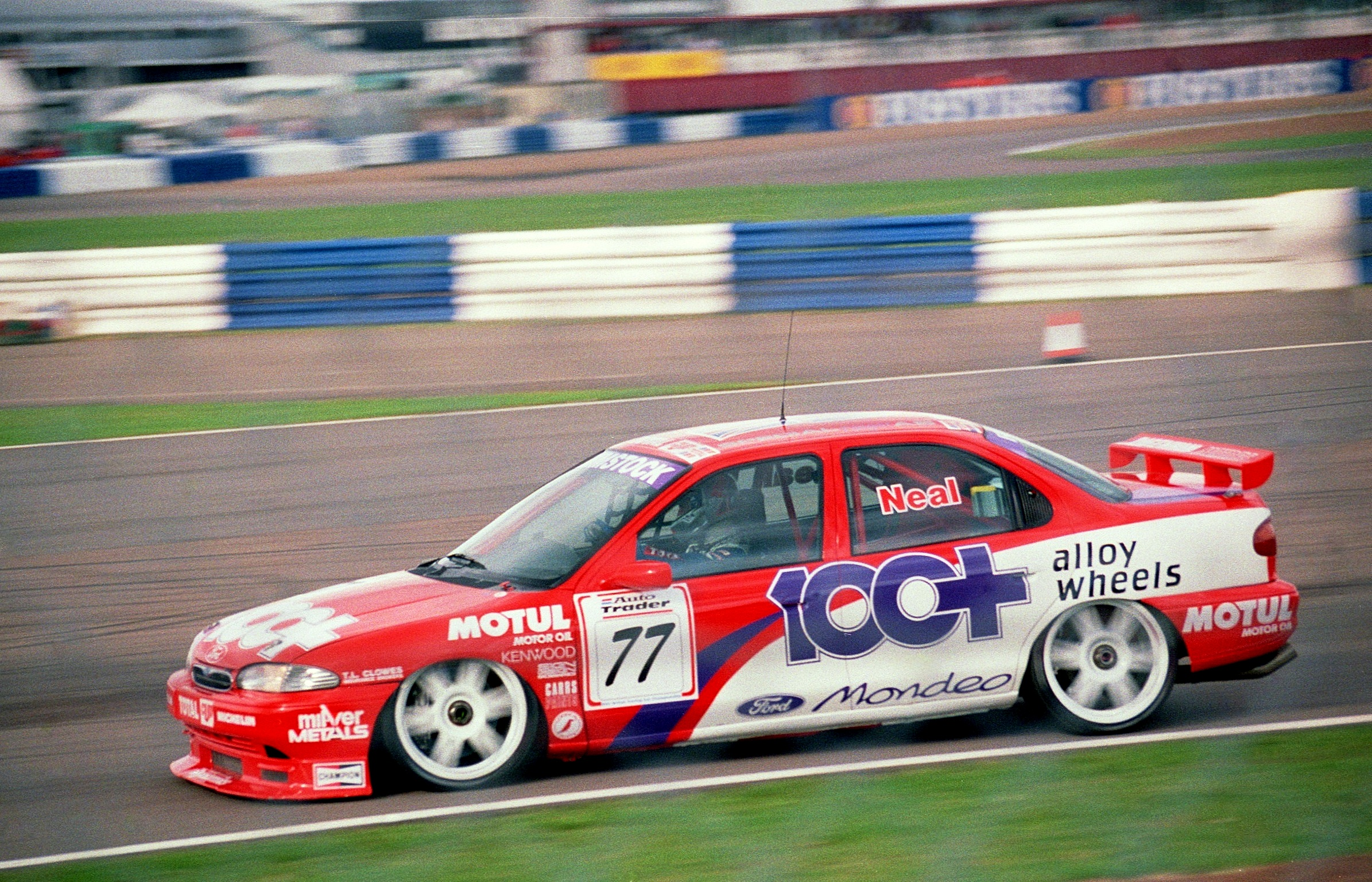
Neal driving the Team Dynamics Ford Mondeo at Silverstone during the 1995 British Touring Car Championship season.

Neal made his BTCC debut with Pyramid Motorsport at the Silverstone round of the 1991 BTCC season driving a BMW M3. He finished 13th in his first race before returning to the series two rounds later at Oulton Park with the Auto Trader Techspeed Team in another BMW M3. After that race, he would race for the team two rounds later at Donington Park. For 1992, he joined his father's Team Dynamics team driving the BMW M3 which Will Hoy had taken to the championship title the year before. The car was badly damaged in an accident forcing Neal to switch to the new BMW 318 for the final race of the season.

Neal won the Total Cup for drivers without manufacturer support in 1993, before joining Mazda for a season cut short by a huge crash in round five at Silverstone. He rejoined Dynamics for 1995, remaining for several years and he occasionally humbled the big names, as well as winning the Independents' title three further times in 1995, 1999 and 2000.

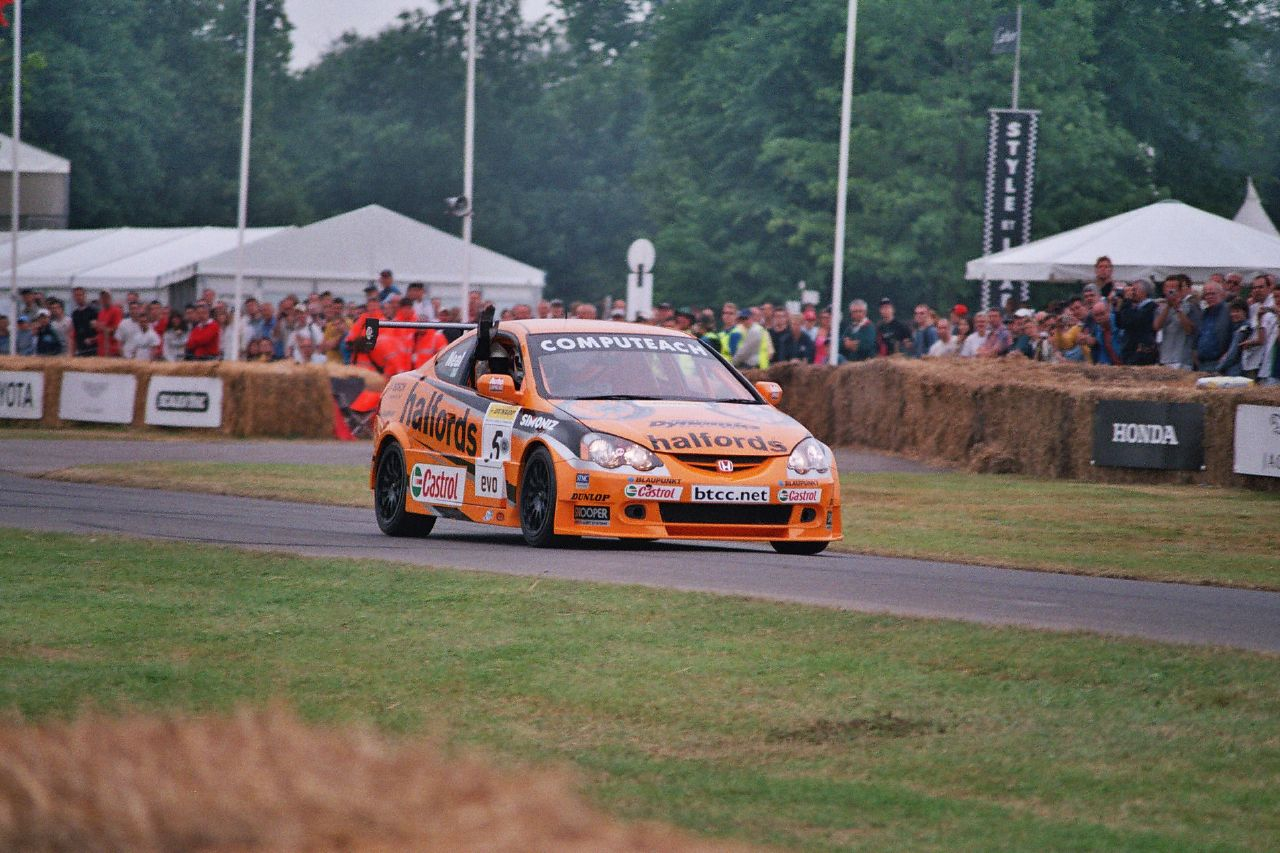
Neal demonstrates his Honda Integra at the 2006 Goodwood Festival of Speed.

In 1999, Neal caused a sensation by winning a race at Donington Park in a Nissan Primera, the first Independent to do so in the modern era, winning him a £250,000 prize from BTCC series promoter Alan J. Gow. He took a further win a year later, having been considered a driver to cause a surprise in the championship. The championship's regulations changed for 2001, and Neal briefly joined Peugeot Sport UK before sitting out most of the season to race in the European Touring Car Championship.

=== British GT Championship (1998) ===
Neal drove a one-off appearance in the British GT Championship during the 1998 British Grand Prix-supporting race. He finished third, sharing a Porsche 911 GT1 with David Leslie.

=== European Touring Car Championship (2001) ===
After racing in one round of the British Touring Car Championship, Neal switched to the European Touring Car Championship's Super Touring category with RJN Motorsport and their Nissan Primera starting with Round 5 at Magny-Cours. He finished the championship placed 14th in the drivers standings on 266 points, taking one win in the final round in Portugal.

=== Return to the BTCC (2002–2003) ===
Neal returned with egg:sport in 2002 driving a Vauxhall Astra Coupé alongside Paul O'Neill. He finished third in the championship, ahead of his teammate on 145 points.

A one-off appearance in the ASCAR championship at the end of 2002 saw him running as teammate to his future rival Jason Plato. For 2003, he switched to Honda Racing to drive a Honda Civic Type R, the start of long and mainly undisturbed relationship with Honda. Once again he finished third in the championship ahead of teammates Tom Chilton and Alan Morrison.

=== Back to Team Dynamics (2004–2007) ===
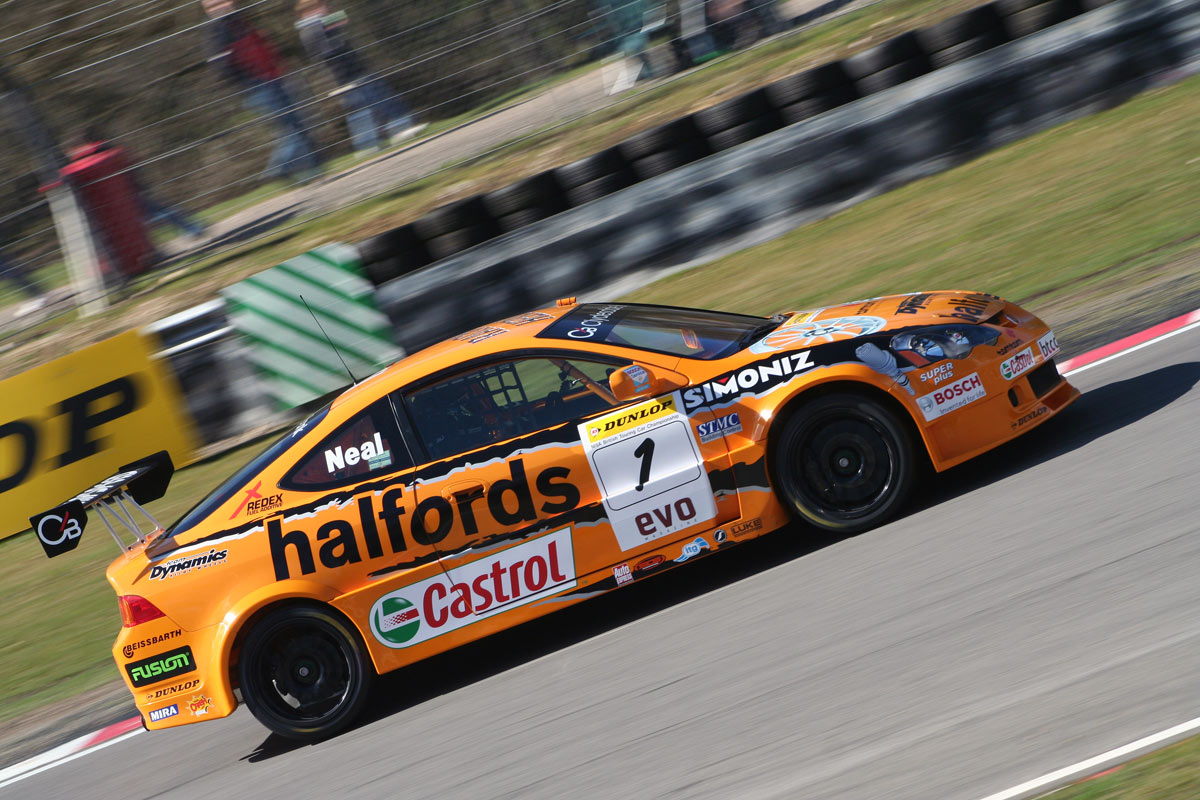
Neal won his second BTCC title in 2006.

Neal rejoined Team Dynamics (now with Halfords sponsorship), finishing 5th in the overall Drivers Championship and 4th in the Independents Championship.

For 2005, the team developed a Honda Integra from its basic road-going form, which was an unusual move as independent teams have historically raced ex-works cars, but the team's efforts were rewarded as Neal eventually took the drivers' title in the last round at Brands Hatch. Dynamics, as Team Halfords also clinched the Teams and Independent Teams Championships. Neal finished every single race in the points, the first driver to do so since the calendar expanded to 30 races per year.

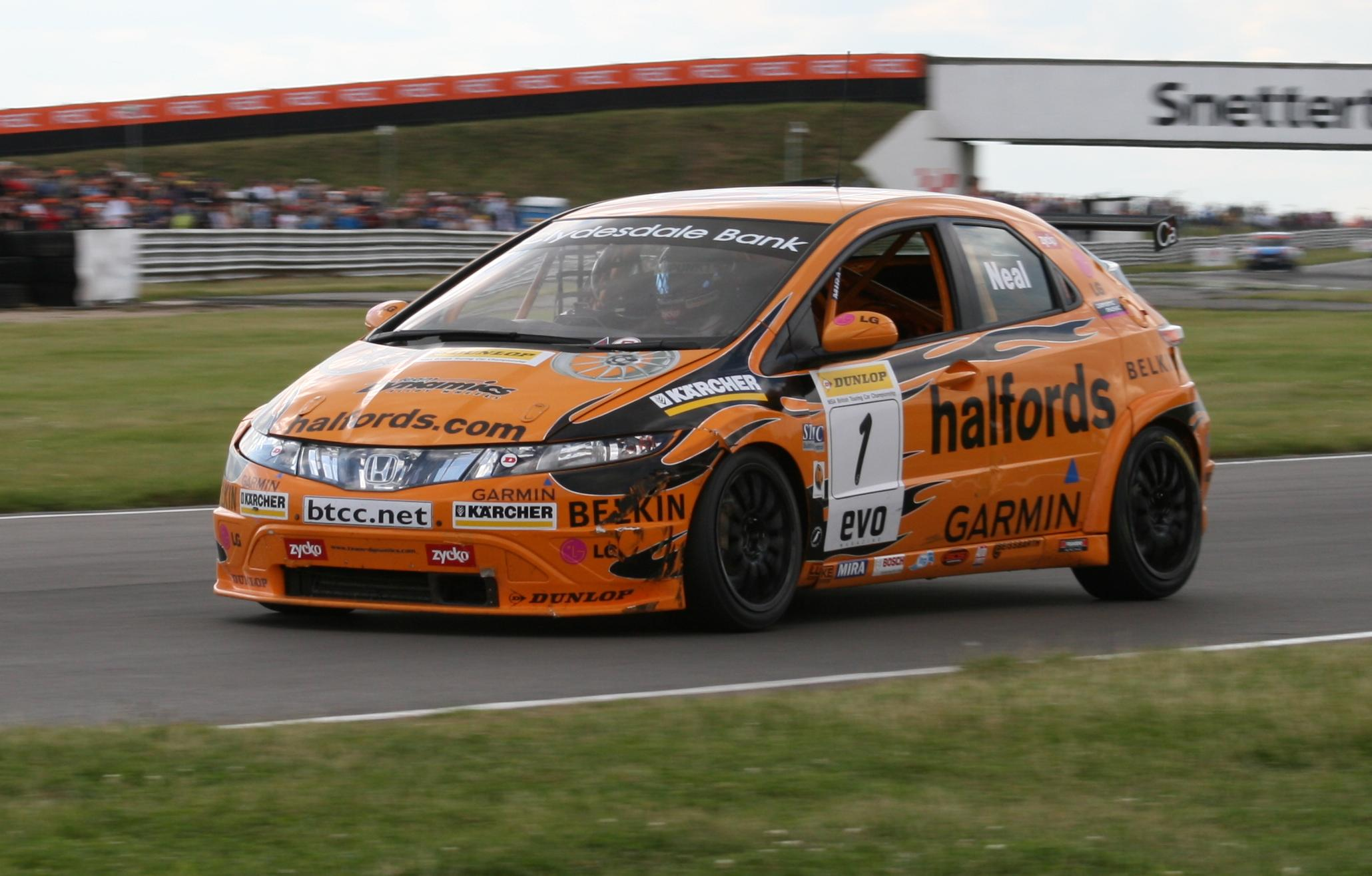
Neal driving the Team Halfords-run Honda Civic at Snetterton in the 2007 BTCC season.

In 2006, Neal drove the No. 1 Honda Integra and captured the championship again with a string of consistent finishes; fourth place in round 28 being enough to clinch his second title. After two years without a mechanical failure, Neal had a suspension failure before the start of the final race.

BTC-spec cars such as the Integra were no longer eligible for the main 2007 title, so Dynamics switched to a Honda Civic, using some of their existing running gear but doing development themselves. Neal won the third race of the season, but overall the SEAT and Vauxhall entries were faster, leaving Neal unable to fight for the title. A huge crash in race 1 of the second meeting at Brands Hatch left him briefly hospitalised; the lost points from this saw teammate Gordon Shedden outpoint him to finish third overall, with Neal fourth. He attracted controversy during the season's final race, in which Fabrizio Giovanardi and Jason Plato fought for the drivers' title. Having signed on as a Vauxhall driver for 2008, Neal let Vauxhall drivers Giovanardi and Tom Chilton through without a fight, but did not do the same for SEAT driver Jason Plato, ensuring Giovanardi would win the title.

=== VX Racing (2008–2009) ===
In his first year for VX Racing in 2008, Neal took just one win at Rockingham, while teammate Giovanardi took five wins on the way to retaining his title. He finished the year fifth in the standings. After a strong start to 2009, winning the opening race at Brands Hatch, he failed to win again all season, finishing fourth in the standings behind Giovanardi.

=== Honda Racing (2010–2020) ===
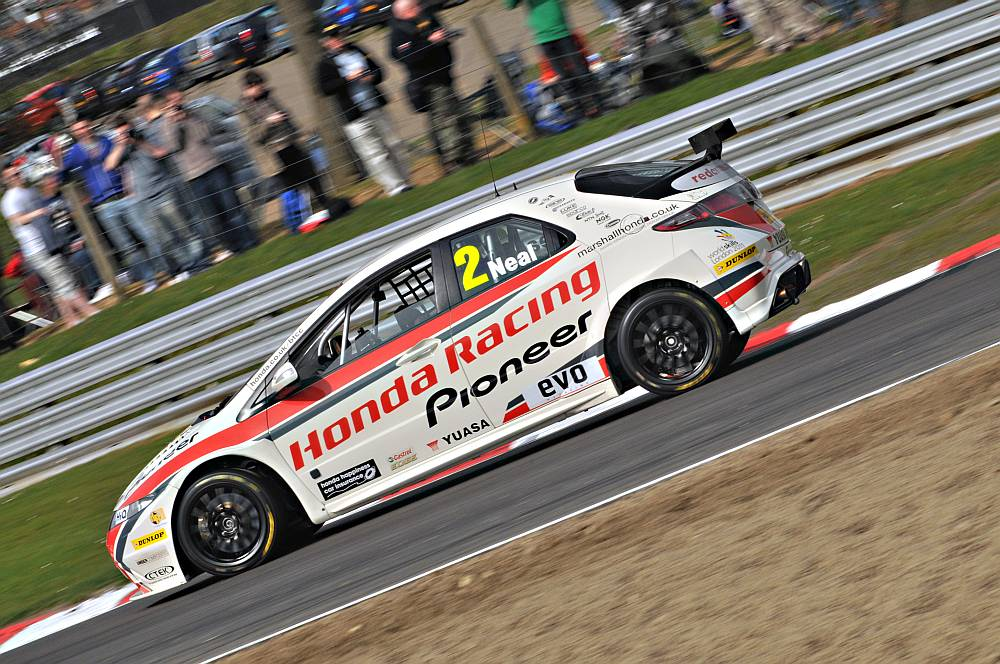
Neal driving for the Honda Racing Team at Brands Hatch in the 2011 BTCC season

Neal returned to Team Dynamics for the 2010 season, now racing under the Honda Racing banner alongside former teammate Gordon Shedden. Neal lost out in the drivers championship to Jason Plato late in the season but he helped Honda Racing take the Manufacturers and Teams Championships.

Neal stayed with Honda in 2011, with the Honda Civic now using a 2.0 NGTC Honda engine built by Neil Brown Engines. For much of the season the Civics had an advantage over the rest of the field and after a closely fought title battle with his teammate, Neal took his third drivers' title – after 2005 and 2006 – for the Honda Racing team at the final round at Silverstone, this helping his team to secure the Manufacturers and Constructors title.

In 2012, Neal drove the new NGTC Honda Civic. He took the first ever win for an NGTC car in the British Touring Car Championship in the second race of the season at Brands Hatch. Neal won two more races at Oulton Park and with teammate Shedden taking the other win, Honda Yuasa Racing Team became the first team to win all three races in a day since Team Aon won all three races at Silverstone in 2010. He finished the season second in the championship behind teammate Shedden.

Neal stayed with Honda for the 2013 season alongside Shedden. Prior to the Silverstone round Neal broke his finger in a martial arts accident but was passed fitted to race by a doctor He underwent surgery before the season finale at Brands Hatch, Alain Menu tested for the team as a possible substitute for Neal in the event he was unable to race. Neal finished the year fourth in the championship, two places behind teammate Shedden.

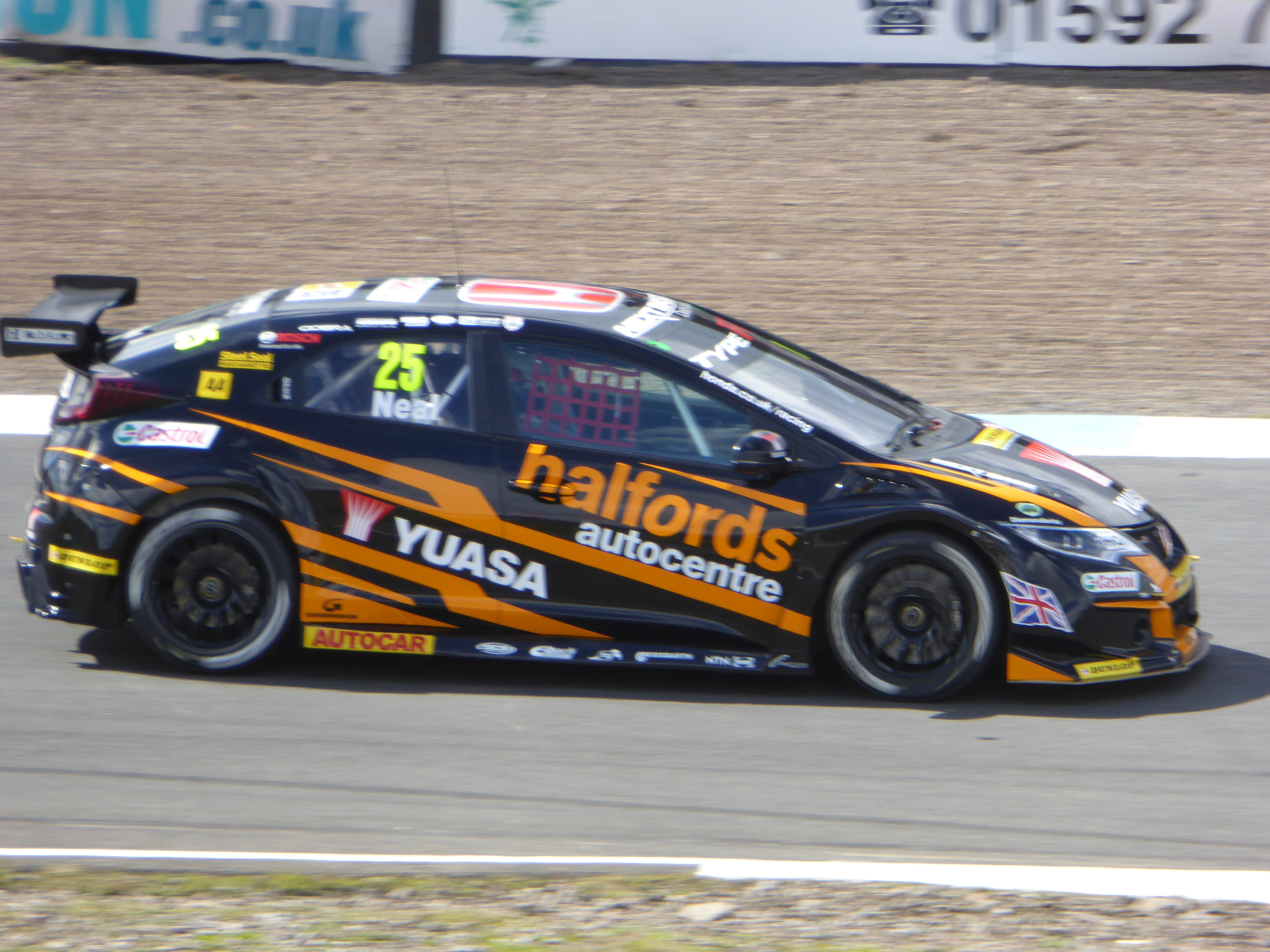
Neal, at the Knockhill round of the 2017 British Touring Car Championship.

Neal was again paired with Shedden for the 2014 season, this time driving the new Honda Civic Tourer. Neal was placed 9th in the overall standings.

For the 2021 season, Neal made no appearances on the BTCC grid for the first time since his debut in 1991, after Team Dynamics lost backing from Honda and GS Yuasa and obtained sponsorship from Cataclean: as a result the team fielded Shedden and Cataclean-backed driver Daniel Rowbottom as their 2021 line-up. According to Neal the team secured a sponsor to field a third car for him, however this was scuppered when other teams objected to the plan. He described the enforced break in his BTCC career as "not a retirement".

=== Australia ===
Neal has competed at the Bathurst 1000 on four occasions; in 1997 and 1998 with Steven Richards in a Team Dynamics Nissan Primera, in 2000 in a Paul Morris Motorsport Holden Commodore VT with Paul Morris. He withdrew from 2001 where he was due to co-drive with Paul Morris due to the 9/11 terrorist attacks a month before the race and in 2008 in a Paul Morris Motorsport Holden Commodore VE with Boris Said. He also drove with Morris at the 2001 Queensland 500.

=== Other activities ===
Neal lives in Shenstone, Worcestershire.

Neal has appeared on Top Gear multiple times. He first raced in the Historic People Carrier race in Series 5. He participated in a football match using Toyota Aygos in Series 6 driving for James May's team. He raced a Mitsubishi L300 motorhome in the tenth series during a motorhome race. Neal appeared once again in Series 12's Bus Race, driving an Optare MetroRider. He then appeared in Series 14's airport vehicles race. In Series 20, episode 2 he drove a Mercedes-Benz E-Class in a taxi race. Elsewhere Neal has worked alongside Martin Haven as a co-commentator on Eurosport's coverage of the former World Touring Car Championship since 2010 and currently the World Touring Car Cup.

In May 2009, Neal gave both the Beijing gold medallist and 2008 World Cycling Champion, Ed Clancy and double World Cycling Champion, Rob Hayles, masterclasses around Oulton Park in a Vauxhall Astra 888 road car, prepared by Triple Eight Engineering – the team behind VX Racing.

In March 2015, Neal drove for Milltek Sport in their diesel Golf in the Mugello 12hr race finishing second in class, a week later driving a 500Hp 1979 Bastos Chevrolet Camaro with David Clark, he won the Gerry Marshall Trophy race at the Goodwood Members Meeting.

During his 2021 sabbatical, Neal linked up with Jason Plato for a live recording of a BTCC-themed podcast. Since retiring from motorsport, Neal continues to run the Team Dynamics business, as well as dedicating his online presence to right-wing and anti-immigration movements.

== Fitness ==
Neal has stated that he keeps fit through training in martial arts, which gives him better aerobic fitness and flexibility. In 2012, he achieved the grade of 2nd dan black belt in the British Free Fighting Academy, after training with martial arts instructor Andy Hopwood.

== Racing record ==
=== Complete British Touring Car Championship results ===
(key) Races in bold indicate pole position (1 point awarded – 1996–2002 all races, 2003–present just in first race, 2000–2003 in class) Races in italics indicate fastest lap (1 point awarded – 2001–present all races, 2000–2003 in class) * signifies that driver lead race for at least one lap (1 point awarded – 1998–2002 just in feature races, 2003–present all races)

Year	Team	Car	Class	1	2	3	4	5	6	7	8	9	10	11	12	13	14	15	16	17	18	19	20	21	22	23	24	25	26	27	28	29	30	Pen.	DC	Pts
1991	Pyramid Motorsport	BMW M3		SIL	SNE	DON	THR	SIL	BRH	SIL; 13	DON; 1	DON; 2																							30th	0
1991	BRR Motorsport	BMW M3											OUL; Ret	BRH; 1	BRH; 2	DON; DNS	THR	SIL																	30th	0
1992	Rimstock Racing	BMW M3		SIL; 14	THR; Ret	OUL; Ret	SNE; Ret	BRH; 8	DON; 1; 13	DON; 2; 11	SIL; Ret	KNO; 1; 7	KNO; 2 Ret	PEM; 15	BRH; 1; 11	BRH; 2; 10	DON; Ret																		16th	5
1992	Rimstock Racing	BMW 318is																SIL; 12																	16th	5
1993	Team Dynamics	BMW 318is		SIL; 8	DON; Ret	SNE; DNS	DON; 17	OUL; Ret	BRH; 1; 14	BRH; 2 Ret	PEM; 18	SIL; 13	KNO; 1; 14	KNO; 2; 15	OUL; 16	BRH; 18																			20th	3
1993	Team Dynamics	BMW 318i															THR; 19	DON; 1; 13	DON; 2; 14	SIL; 17															20th	3
1994	Team Mazda	Mazda Xedos 6		THR; 12	BRH; 1; 15	BRH; 2; 17	SNE; 10	SIL; 1; 15	SIL; 2 DNS	OUL	DON; 1	DON; 2	BRH; 1	BRH; 2	SIL	KNO; 1	KNO; 2	OUL	BRH; 1	BRH; 2	SIL; 1	SIL; 2	DON; 1	DON; 2											23rd	1
1995	Team Dynamics	Ford Mondeo Ghia		DON; 1; 15	DON; 2; 14	BRH; 1; 16	BRH; 2; 13	THR; 1 Ret	THR; 2; 15	SIL; 1; 13	SIL; 2; 14	OUL; 1; 13	OUL; 2; 14	BRH; 1 Ret	BRH; 2 DNS	DON; 1 Ret	DON; 2 Ret	SIL; 14	KNO; 1; 9	KNO; 2; 13	BRH; 1; 15	BRH; 2; 12	SNE; 1; 15	SNE; 2; 4	OUL; 1; 13	OUL; 2; 11	SIL; 1; 17	SIL; 2; 11							21st	12
1996	Team Dynamics	Ford Mondeo Si		DON; 1	DON; 2	BRH; 1 Ret	BRH; 2; 16	THR; 1; 11	THR; 2 Ret	SIL; 1; 17	SIL; 2 Ret	OUL; 1	OUL; 2	SNE; 1 Ret	SNE; 2 DNS	BRH; 1	BRH; 2	SIL; 1 Ret	SIL; 2; 17	KNO; 1; 14	KNO; 2; 13	OUL; 1; 13	OUL; 2; 14	THR; 1; 10	THR; 2; 18	DON; 1; 14	DON; 2 Ret	BRH; 1; 12	BRH; 2; 13						22nd	1
1997	Team Dynamics	Ford Mondeo		DON; 1 Ret	DON; 2; 12	SIL; 1 Ret	SIL; 2 DNS	THR; 1; 13	THR; 2; 14	BRH; 1; 15	BRH; 2 DNS	OUL; 1; 15	OUL; 2; 14																						21st	0
1997	Team Dynamics	Nissan Primera eGT												DON; 1; 16	DON; 2; 13	CRO; 1; 13	CRO; 2 Ret	KNO; 1 Ret	KNO; 2 DNS	SNE; 1 Ret	SNE; 2; 12	THR; 1; 11	THR; 2 Ret	BRH; 1 Ret	BRH; 2; 16	SIL; 1; 14	SIL; 2; 12								21st	0
1998	Team Dynamics Max Power	Nissan Primera GT		THR; 1 Ret	THR; 2; 10	SIL; 1 Ret	SIL; 2; 16	DON; 1; 5	DON; 2; 9	BRH; 1 Ret	BRH; 2; 5	OUL; 1 Ret	OUL; 2; 14	DON; 1 Ret	DON; 2; 6	CRO; 1; 12	CRO; 2; 15	SNE; 1 NC	SNE; 2; 13	THR; 1; 12	THR; 2 Ret	KNO; 1; 8	KNO; 2 Ret	BRH; 1; 9	BRH; 2; 5	OUL; 1; 13	OUL; 2; 7	SIL; 1 Ret	SIL; 2 Ret						13th	35
1999	Max Power Racing Team Dynamics	Nissan Primera GT		DON; 1; 5	**DON**; **2**; 1*	SIL; 1; 4	SIL; 2 Ret	THR; 1; 3	THR; 2 Ret	BRH; 1 Ret	BRH; 2; 3	OUL; 1; 10	OUL; 2; 2	DON; 1; 10	DON; 2; 7	CRO; 1; 10	CRO; 2; 5*	SNE; 1; 7	SNE; 2; 10	THR; 1; 6	THR; 2 Ret	KNO; 1; 7	KNO; 2 Ret	BRH; 1; 5	BRH; 2; 10	OUL; 1; 6	OUL; 2; 10	SIL; 1 Ret	SIL; 2; 6						9th	109
2000	Team Dynamics Max Power Racing	Nissan Primera GT '00	S	BRH; 1 ovr:10 cls:10	BRH; 2 Ret	DON; 1 ovr:8 cls:8	DON; 2 ovr:8 cls:8	THR; 1 ovr:7 cls:7	THR; 2 Ret	KNO; 1 ovr:4 cls:4	KNO; 2 ovr:5 cls:5	OUL; 1 ovr:6 cls:6	OUL; 2 ovr:9 cls:9	SIL; 1 ovr:4 cls:4	SIL; 2 Ret	CRO; 1 ovr:3 cls:3	CRO; 2 ovr:3 cls:3	SNE; 1 ovr:5 cls:5	SNE; 2 ovr:8* cls:8	DON; 1 ovr:2 cls:2	DON; 2 ovr:2 cls:2	BRH; 1 ovr:1 cls:1	BRH; 2 ovr:9 cls:9	OUL; 1 ovr:7 cls:7	OUL; 2 ovr:7* cls:7										8th	129
2000	Team Dynamics Max Power Racing	Nissan Primera GT '98	S																							SIL; 1 ovr:5 cls:5	SIL; 2 ovr:7 cls:7								8th	129
2001	Peugeot Sport UK	Peugeot 406 Coupé	T	BRH; 1; 6†	BRH; 2 ovr:5 cls:5	THR; 1	THR; 2	OUL; 1	OUL; 2	SIL; 1	SIL; 2	MON; 1	MON; 2	DON; 1	DON; 2	KNO; 1	KNO; 2	SNE; 1	SNE; 2	CRO; 1	CRO; 2	OUL; 1	OUL; 2	SIL; 1	SIL; 2	DON; 1	DON; 2	BRH; 1	BRH; 2						14th	11
2002	egg:sport	Vauxhall Astra Coupé	T	BRH; 1 ovr:1 cls:1	BRH; 2 ovr:4 cls:4	**OUL**; **1** ovr:4 cls:4	**OUL**; **2** Ret*	THR; 1 ovr:2 cls:2	THR; 2 ovr:3* cls:3	**SIL**; **1** ovr:6 cls:6	SIL; 2 ovr:3* cls:3	MON; 1 ovr:1 cls:1	MON; 2 ovr:3 cls:3	CRO; 1 Ret	CRO; 2 Ret	**SNE**; **1** Ret	SNE; 2 Ret*	KNO; 1 ovr:1 cls:1	KNO; 2 ovr:4 cls:4	BRH; 1 ovr:4 cls:4	BRH; 2 ovr:8 cls:8	DON; 1 ovr:3 cls:3	DON; 2 Ret											−5	**3rd**	**145**
2003	Honda Racing	Honda Civic Type-R	T	MON; 1 Ret*	MON; 2 Ret	BRH; 1 ovr:1* cls:1	**BRH**; **2** ovr:7 cls:7	**THR**; **1** ovr:2* cls:2	THR; 2 ovr:11* cls:11	SIL; 1 Ret*	SIL; 2 Ret	ROC; 1 ovr:1* cls:1	**ROC**; **2** Ret	CRO; 1 ovr:1* cls:1	**CRO**; **2** ovr:5* cls:5	SNE; 1 ovr:4* cls:4	SNE; 2 ovr:1* cls:1	BRH; 1 ovr:4 cls:4	BRH; 2 Ret	DON; 1 ovr:1* cls:1	**DON**; **2** ovr:10 cls:10	OUL; 1 ovr:12 cls:12	OUL; 2 ovr:1* cls:1												**3rd**	**148**
2004	Computeach Racing with Halfords	Honda Civic Type-R		THR; 1; 2	THR; 2 Ret	THR; 3; 9	BRH; 1; 1*	BRH; 2 DNS	BRH; 3; 7	SIL; 1; 1*	SIL; 2; 8	SIL; 3; 8	OUL; 1; 3	OUL; 2; 4	OUL; 3; 2	MON; 1; 4	MON; 2; 10	MON; 3 Ret	CRO; 1; 3	CRO; 2; 5	CRO; 3 Ret	KNO; 1; 9	KNO; 2; 2	KNO; 3; 8	**BRH**; **1**; 1*	BRH; 2; 5	BRH; 3; 4	SNE; 1; 2	SNE; 2 Ret	SNE; 3; 4	DON; 1 Ret	DON; 2 Ret	DON; 3 Ret		5th	181
2005	Team Halfords	Honda Integra Type-R		DON; 1; 1*	**DON**; **2**; 3	DON; 3; 1*	THR; 1; 3	THR; 2; 2	THR; 3; 4	**BRH**; **1**; 1*	**BRH**; **2**; 1*	BRH; 3; 6	OUL; 1; 2	OUL; 2; 1*	OUL; 3; 2	CRO; 1; 3	CRO; 2; 6	CRO; 3; 2	MON; 1; 3	MON; 2; 3	MON; 3; 7	SNE; 1; 3	SNE; 2; 3	SNE; 3; 4	KNO; 1; 2	KNO; 2; 1*	KNO; 3; 2	SIL; 1; 9	SIL; 2; 4	SIL; 3; 7	BRH; 1; 4	BRH; 2; 3	BRH; 3; 5		**1st**	**316**
2006	Team Halfords	Honda Integra Type-R		BRH; 1; 3	BRH; 2; 3	BRH; 3 Ret	**MON**; **1**; 1*	**MON**; **2**; 1*	MON; 3; 3	OUL; 1; 4	OUL; 2; 1*	OUL; 3; 8	THR; 1; 2	THR; 2; 1*	THR; 3; 2	CRO; 1; 3	CRO; 2; 1*	CRO; 3; 4	DON; 1; 4	DON; 2; 5	DON; 3; 7	SNE; 1; 6	SNE; 2; 8	SNE; 3; 1*	KNO; 1; 2	KNO; 2; 5	KNO; 3; 1*	BRH; 1; 2	BRH; 2; 2	BRH; 3 Ret	SIL; 1; 4	SIL; 2; 1*	SIL; 3 Ret		**1st**	**289**
2007	Team Halfords	Honda Civic		BRH; 1; 3	BRH; 2; 5	BRH; 3; 1*	ROC; 1; 5	ROC; 2 Ret	ROC; 3; 7	THR; 1; 5	THR; 2; 2	THR; 3; 5	CRO; 1; 3	CRO; 2; 13	CRO; 3; 6	OUL; 1; 4	OUL; 2; 4	OUL; 3 Ret	DON; 1; 3	DON; 2; 4	DON; 3; 2	SNE; 1; 18	SNE; 2; 2	SNE; 3; 2	BRH; 1 Ret	BRH; 2 DNS	BRH; 3 DNS	KNO; 1 Ret	KNO; 2; 6	KNO; 3; 2*	THR; 1; 5	THR; 2; 3	THR; 3; 5		4th	195
2008	VX Racing	Vauxhall Vectra		BRH; 1; 5	BRH; 2; 7	BRH; 3; 3	ROC; 1; 3	ROC; 2; 11	ROC; 3; 1*	DON; 1; 2	DON; 2 Ret	DON; 3; 6	THR; 1; 4	THR; 2; 3	THR; 3; 4	CRO; 1; 2	CRO; 2; 3	CRO; 3; 3	SNE; 1; 10	SNE; 2; 5	SNE; 3; 4	OUL; 1; 15	OUL; 2; 7	OUL; 3; 5	KNO; 1; 16	KNO; 2; 10	KNO; 3; 7	SIL; 1; 6	SIL; 2; 4	SIL; 3; 15	BRH; 1; 6	BRH; 2; 2	BRH; 3; 8		5th	185
2009	VX Racing	Vauxhall Vectra		**BRH**; **1**; 1*	**BRH**; **2**; 3	BRH; 3; 3	THR; 1; 2	THR; 2; 3	THR; 3; 7	DON; 1; 3	DON; 2; 2	DON; 3; 8	OUL; 1; 7	OUL; 2; 4	OUL; 3; 3	CRO; 1; 6	CRO; 2; 6	CRO; 3; 8	SNE; 1; 9	SNE; 2; 14	SNE; 3; 3	KNO; 1 Ret	KNO; 2; 4	KNO; 3; 4	SIL; 1; 10	SIL; 2 Ret	SIL; 3; 13	ROC; 1 Ret	ROC; 2 NC	ROC; 3 Ret	BRH; 1; 5	BRH; 2; 8	**BRH**; **3**; 5*		4th	170
2010	Honda Racing Team	Honda Civic		THR; 1; 12	THR; 2; 2	THR; 3 Ret	ROC; 1; 1*	**ROC**; **2**; 9	**ROC**; **3**; 1*	BRH; 1; 5	BRH; 2 Ret	BRH; 3; 2	OUL; 1; 8	OUL; 2; 2	OUL; 3; 1*	CRO; 1; 4	CRO; 2; 2*	CRO; 3 Ret	SNE; 1 Ret	SNE; 2; 9	SNE; 3; 3	SIL; 1; 8	SIL; 2; 5	SIL; 3; 4	KNO; 1; 4	KNO; 2; 1*	KNO; 3; 3	DON; 1; 5	DON; 2; 8	DON; 3; 1*	BRH; 1; 3	BRH; 2; 2	BRH; 3 Ret		**2nd**	**229**
2011	Honda Racing Team	Honda Civic		**BRH**; **1** Ret	BRH; 2; 7	**BRH**; **3**; 1*	**DON**; **1**; 1*	**DON**; **2**; 3	DON; 3; 7	THR; 1; 2*	THR; 2; 1*	THR; 3; 5	OUL; 1; 8*	OUL; 2 Ret	OUL; 3; 4	CRO; 1; 1*	**CRO**; **2**; 1*	CRO; 3; 7	SNE; 1; 18	SNE; 2; 17	SNE; 3; 4	KNO; 1; 2	KNO; 2; 2*	KNO; 3; 4	ROC; 1; 4	ROC; 2; 3	ROC; 3; 6	BRH; 1; 18	BRH; 2; 7	BRH; 3; 1*	**SIL**; **1**; 1*	**SIL**; **2**; 2	SIL; 3; 8		**1st**	**257**
2012	Honda Yuasa Racing Team	Honda Civic		BRH; 1; 2*	BRH; 2; 1*	BRH; 3; 7	DON; 1; 3	DON; 2; 2	DON; 3 Ret	THR; 1; 10	THR; 2; 5	THR; 3; 2*	OUL; 1; 1*	**OUL**; **2**; 5	OUL; 3; 1*	**CRO**; **1**; 1*	**CRO**; **2**; 2*	CRO; 3; 4	SNE; 1; 4	SNE; 2; 4	SNE; 3; 8	KNO; 1; 7	KNO; 2; 8	KNO; 3; 3	ROC; 1; 6	ROC; 2; 2*	ROC; 3; 2*	SIL; 1 Ret	SIL; 2 Ret	SIL; 3 Ret	BRH; 1; 1*	**BRH**; **2**; 3	BRH; 3; 2		**2nd**	**387**
2013	Honda Yuasa Racing Team	Honda Civic		BRH; 1; 21	BRH; 2; 4	BRH; 3; 1*	DON; 1; 3	DON; 2; 4	DON; 3; 3	THR; 1; 1*	**THR**; **2**; 1*	THR; 3; 2	OUL; 1; 6	OUL; 2; 4	OUL; 3; 4	CRO; 1; 2	CRO; 2; 4	CRO; 3; 1*	SNE; 1; 9	SNE; 2; 2	SNE; 3; 8	KNO; 1; 7	KNO; 2; 5	KNO; 3; 2	ROC; 1; 14	ROC; 2 Ret	ROC; 3; 7	SIL; 1; 3	SIL; 2; 6	**SIL**; **3**; 3	BRH; 1; 6	BRH; 2 Ret	BRH; 3; 14		4th	356
2014	Honda Yuasa Racing Team	Honda Civic Tourer		BRH; 1; 3	BRH; 2; 4	BRH; 3; 2	DON; 1; 8	DON; 2; 5	DON; 3; 3	THR; 1; 2	THR; 2; 4	THR; 3; 23	OUL; 1; 13	OUL; 2; 12	OUL; 3 Ret	CRO; 1; 5	CRO; 2 DSQ	CRO; 3 Ret	SNE; 1; 3	SNE; 2; 4	SNE; 3; 11	KNO; 1; 1*	**KNO**; **2**; 14*	KNO; 3; 11	ROC; 1; 17	ROC; 2; 14	ROC; 3; 9	SIL; 1; 21	SIL; 2; 13	SIL; 3; 12	BRH; 1 Ret	BRH; 2 DNS	BRH; 3 DNS		8th	207
2015	Honda Yuasa Racing Team	Honda Civic Type R		BRH; 1; 8	BRH; 2; 8	BRH; 3; 1*	DON; 1; 17	DON; 2; 2	DON; 3; 1*	THR; 1; 2	THR; 2 Ret	THR; 3; 6	OUL; 1; 2	OUL; 2; 4	OUL; 3; 3*	CRO; 1; 5	CRO; 2; 11	CRO; 3; 9	SNE; 1; 6	SNE; 2 Ret	SNE; 3; 11	KNO; 1; 6	KNO; 2; 8	KNO; 3; 1*	ROC; 1; 8	ROC; 2; 5	ROC; 3; 4	SIL; 1; 8	SIL; 2; 5	SIL; 3; 6	BRH; 1; 7	BRH; 2; 7	**BRH**; **3**; 5		3rd	317
2016	Halfords Yuasa Racing	Honda Civic Type R		BRH; 1; 3	BRH; 2; 2	BRH; 3; 5	DON; 1; 12	DON; 2; 6	DON; 3; 1*	THR; 1 Ret*	THR; 2; 11	THR; 3; 2	OUL; 1; 9	OUL; 2; 7	**OUL**; **3**; 1*	CRO; 1; 12	CRO; 2; 10	CRO; 3; 11	SNE; 1; 8	SNE; 2; 3	SNE; 3; 10	KNO; 1; 8	KNO; 2; 1*	KNO; 3; 5	ROC; 1; 8	ROC; 2; 6	ROC; 3; 4	SIL; 1 Ret	SIL; 2; 15	SIL; 3; 5	BRH; 1; 7	BRH; 2 Ret	BRH; 3 DNS		6th	275
2017	Halfords Yuasa Racing	Honda Civic Type R		BRH; 1 Ret	BRH; 2; 11	BRH; 3; 4	DON; 1; 2	DON; 2; 7	DON; 3 Ret	**THR**; **1**; 1*	**THR**; **2**; 29*	THR; 3; 11	**OUL**; **1**; 2	OUL; 2; 3	OUL; 3; 2	CRO; 1 Ret	CRO; 2; 18	CRO; 3; 5	SNE; 1; 3	SNE; 2; 9	SNE; 3 Ret	KNO; 1; 9	KNO; 2 Ret	KNO; 3; 8	ROC; 1; 5	ROC; 2 Ret	ROC; 3; 13	SIL; 1; 13	SIL; 2; 13	SIL; 3; 1*	BRH; 1; 10	BRH; 2; 3	BRH; 3; 8		7th	243
2018	Halfords Yuasa Racing	Honda Civic Type R (FK8)		BRH; 1 Ret	BRH; 2; 29	BRH; 3; 12	DON; 1; 6	DON; 2; 16	DON; 3; 7	**THR**; **1**; 1*	**THR**; **2**; 3	THR; 3; 8	OUL; 1; 5	OUL; 2; 2	OUL; 3; 14	CRO; 1; 9	CRO; 2; 7	CRO; 3; 4	SNE; 1; 14	SNE; 2; 21	SNE; 3; 1*	ROC; 1; 18	ROC; 2; 14	ROC; 3; 15	KNO; 1 Ret	KNO; 2; 17	KNO; 3; 15	SIL; 1 Ret	SIL; 2; 14	SIL; 3; 7	BRH; 1; 2	BRH; 2; 2	BRH; 3; 21		9th	223
2019	Halfords Yuasa Racing	Honda Civic Type R (FK8)		BRH; 1; 8	BRH; 2; 11	**BRH**; **3**; 8*	DON; 1; 4	DON; 2; 2	DON; 3; 18	THR; 1; 7	THR; 2; 5	THR; 3; 4	CRO; 1; 10	CRO; 2; 4	CRO; 3; 5	OUL; 1 Ret	OUL; 2; 11	OUL; 3; 11	SNE; 1 Ret	SNE; 2; 16	SNE; 3; 11	THR; 1; 8	THR; 2; 3	THR; 3; 3	KNO; 1 Ret	KNO; 2; 15	KNO; 3; 11	SIL; 1; 6	SIL; 2 Ret	SIL; 3; 3	BRH; 1; 2	BRH; 2; 4	BRH; 3; 13		9th	232
2020	Halfords Yuasa Racing	Honda Civic Type R (FK8)		DON; 1; 5	DON; 2; 7	DON; 3; 8	BRH; 1 Ret	BRH; 2 Ret	BRH; 3; 6	OUL; 1 NC	OUL; 2; 13	OUL; 3 NC	KNO; 1; 7	KNO; 2; 15	KNO; 3; 12	THR; 1; 3	THR; 2; 3	THR; 3; 7	SIL; 1; 8	SIL; 2; 4	SIL; 3; 11	CRO; 1; 7	CRO; 2; 2*	CRO; 3; 4	SNE; 1; 13	SNE; 2; 12	SNE; 3; 13	BRH; 1; 7	BRH; 2; 16	BRH; 3; 14					11th	181

† Event with 2 races staged for the different classes.

=== Complete Deutsche Tourenwagen Meisterschaft results ===
(key) (Races in bold indicate pole position) (Races in italics indicate fastest lap)

Year	Team	Car	1	2	3	4	5	6	7	8	9	10	11	12	13	14	15	16	17	18	19	20	21	22	DC	Pts
1993	Team Dynamics	BMW 318i	ZOL; 1	ZOL; 2	HOC; 1	HOC; 2	NÜR; 1	NÜR; 2	WUN; 1	WUN; 2	NÜR; 1	NÜR; 2	NOR; 1	NOR; 2	DON; 1 Ret	DON; 2; 19	DIE; 1	DIE; 2	SIN; 1	SIN; 2	AVU; 1	AVU; 2	HOC; 1	HOC; 2	NC†	0†

† Not classified in championship due to only entering in the non-championship event.

=== Complete V8 Supercar Championship results ===
Supercars results
Year	Team	Car	1	2	3	4	5	6	7	8	9	10	11	12	13	14	15	16	17	18	19	20	21	22	23	24	25	26	27	28	29	30	31	32	33	34	35	36	37	38	Position	Points	Ref
2000	Paul Morris Motorsport	Holden Commodore VT	PHI; R1	PHI; R2	BAR; R3	BAR; R4	BAR; R5	ADE; R6	ADE; R7	EAS; R8	EAS; R9	EAS; R10	HID; R11	HID; R12	HID; R13	CAN; R14	CAN; R15	CAN; R16	QLD; R17	QLD; R18	QLD; R19	WIN; R20	WIN; R21	WIN; R22	ORA; R23	ORA; R24	ORA; R25	CAL; R26	CAL; R27	CAL; R28	QLD; R29	SAN; R30	SAN; R31	SAN; R32	BAT; R33; 12						40th	96	
2001	Paul Morris Motorsport	Holden Commodore VT	PHI; R1	PHI; R2	ADE; R3	ADE; R4	EAS; R5	EAS; R6	HID; R7	HID; R8	HID; R9	CAN; R10	CAN; R11	CAN; R12	BAR; R13	BAR; R14	BAR; R15	CAL; R16	CAL; R17	CAL; R18	ORA; R19; DNS	ORA; R20; DNS	QLD; R21; 10	WIN; R22	WIN; R23	BAT; R24	PUK; R25	PUK; R26	PUK; R27	SAN; R28	SAN; R29	SAN; R30									56th	195	
2008	Paul Morris Motorsport	Holden Commodore VE	ADE; R1	ADE; R2	EAS; R3	EAS; R4	EAS; R5	HAM; R6	HAM; R7	HAM; R8	BAR; R29	BAR; R10	BAR; R11	SAN; R12	SAN; R13	SAN; R14	HDV; R15	HDV; R16	HDV; R17	QLD; R18	QLD; R19	QLD; R20	WIN; R21	WIN; R22	WIN; R23	PHI; QR; 25	PHI; R24; 19	BAT; R25; Ret	SUR; R26	SUR; R27	SUR; R28	BHR; R29	BHR; R30	BHR; R31	SYM; R32	SYM; R33	SYM; R34	ORA; R35	ORA; R36	ORA; R37	57th	94	

=== Complete European Touring Car Championship results ===
(key) (Races in bold indicate pole position) (Races in italics indicate fastest lap)

Year	Team	Car	1	2	3	4	5	6	7	8	9	10	11	12	13	14	15	16	17	18	19	20	DC	Pts
2001	(United Kingdom) RJN Motorsport	Nissan Primera GT	MNZ; 1	MNZ; 2	BRN; 1	BRN; 2	MAG; 1 Ret	MAG; 2; 4	SIL; 1; 3	SIL; 2; 4	ZOL; 1 DSQ	ZOL; 2; 2	HUN; 1; 14	HUN; 2 DNS	A1R; 1	A1R; 2	NÜR; 1; 3	NÜR; 2; 18	JAR; 1; 5	JAR; 2 Ret	EST; 1; 22	EST; 2; 1	14th	266

=== Complete Bathurst 1000 results ===
Year	Team	Co-driver	Car	Laps	Pos.	Ref
1997*	(Australia) Garry Rogers Motorsport	(New Zealand) Steven Richards	Nissan Primera	84	DNF	
1998*	(United Kingdom) Team Dynamics	(New Zealand) Steven Richards	Nissan Primera	161	**2nd**	
2000	(Australia) Paul Morris Motorsport	(Australia) Paul Morris	Holden Commodore VT	158	12th	
2008	(Australia) Paul Morris Motorsport	(United States) Boris Said	Holden Commodore VE	140	DNF	

* Super Touring race

Sporting positions
Preceded by James Thompson	British Touring Car Champion; 2005–2006	Succeeded by Fabrizio Giovanardi
Preceded by Jason Plato	British Touring Car Champion; 2011	Succeeded by Gordon Shedden
Awards and achievements
Preceded by James Thompson	Autosport; National Racing Driver of the Year; 2005	Succeeded by Mike Conway
Preceded by Jason Plato	Autosport Awards; National Driver of the Year; 2011	Succeeded by Gordon Shedden
