= List of World Touring Car Cup drivers =

This is a complete list of drivers and teams who have competed in the World Touring Car Cup from 2018 to 2022.

== Drivers ==
Key

Symbol	Meaning
†	Driver has won the Drivers' Cup
^	Driver has competed as a Wildcard Entry only

Name	Country	Seasons	Championships	Races	Starts	Poles	Wins	Podiums	Fastest laps	Points
Mikel Azcona†	Spain	2019–2022	1; 2022	78	78	3	7	24	9	889
Andreas Bäckman	Sweden	2021	0	8	8	0	0	0	0	1
Jessica Bäckman	Sweden	2021	0	8	8	0	0	0	0	2
Nicolas Baert^	Belgium	2020	0	3	3	0	0	0	0	0
Nicola Baldan	Italy	2021	0	4	4	0	0	0	0	0
Mehdi Bennani	Morocco	2018–2019, 2022	0	74	72	1	1	4	3	307
Nathanaël Berthon	France	2018, 2020–2022	0	78	78	4	3	8	9	581
Ahmed BinKhanen^	Saudi Arabia	2022	0	2	2	0	0	0	0	0
Thed Björk	Sweden	2018–2022	0	104	100	7	7	18	6	857
Bence Boldizs	Hungary	2020–2022	0	34	33	0	0	0	0	56
Antti Buri^	Finland	2019	0	3	3	0	0	0	0	0
Nick Catsburg	Netherlands	2019–2020, 2022	0	41	38	2	1	1	2	219
Éric Cayrolle^	France	2022	0	2	2	0	0	0	0	0
Kevin Ceccon	Italy	2018–2019	0	45	45	1	1	7	1	266
Mitchell Cheah	Malaysia	2019–2020	0	6	6	0	0	0	0	4
Aurélien Comte	France	2018, 2020	0	42	40	1	1	6	0	208
Tom Coronel	Netherlands	2018–2022	0	108	107	0	1	4	1	402
André Couto^	Macau	2018	0	3	3	0	0	0	0	0
Robert Dahlgren	Sweden	2019	0	3	3	0	0	0	0	3
Viktor Davidovski^	North Macedonia	2022	0	4	4	0	0	0	0	0
Denis Dupont	Belgium	2018	0	30	28	0	0	2	0	69
Luca Engstler	Germany	2019–2021	0	38	36	0	0	1	0	147
Yann Ehrlacher†	France	2018–2022	2; 2020–2021	104	100	2	7	21	5	1016
Augusto Farfus	Brazil	2019	0	27	27	0	0	2	0	142
Luigi Ferrara	Italy	2018	0	6	6	0	0	0	0	8
Josh Files	United Kingdom	2020	0	3	3	0	0	0	0	9
John Filippi	France	2018	0	30	29	0	0	0	0	14
Luca Filippi^	Italy	2020	0	11	11	0	0	0	0	0
Edgar Florindo^	Portugal	2018	0	3	3	0	0	0	0	0
Petr Fulín^	Czech Republic	2018, 2020–2021	0	8	8	0	0	0	0	13
Jordi Gené	Spain	2021	0	16	14	0	0	0	0	10
Fabrizio Giovanardi	Italy	2018	0	24	23	0	0	0	0	19
Franco Girolami	Argentina	2022	0	4	4	0	0	0	0	16
Néstor Girolami	Argentina	2019–2022	0	78	76	7	7	16	3	647
Nico Gruber	Austria	2020	0	3	3	0	0	0	0	3
Esteban Guerrieri	Argentina	2018–2022	0	108	107	5	10	26	5	1117
Daniel Haglöf	Sweden	2019	0	27	27	0	0	1	1	59
Mat'o Homola	Slovakia	2018	0	30	30	0	1	1	0	48
Robert Huff	United Kingdom	2018–2019, 2021–2022	0	90	87	5	5	16	10	736
Ka To Jim^	Hong Kong	2019	0	3	3	0	0	0	0	0
Douglas Khoo^	Malaysia	2019	0	3	3	0	0	0	0	0
Gábor Kismarty-Lechner	Hungary	2020	0	16	16	0	0	0	0	17
Johan Kristoffersson	Sweden	2019	0	30	30	1	3	5	2	243
Kirill Ladygin^	Russia	2021	0	2	2	0	0	0	0	0
Kam San Lam^	Macau	2018	0	3	0	0	0	0	0	0
Niels Langeveld	Netherlands	2019	0	30	30	0	0	1	0	63
Arthur Law^	Hong Kong	2019	0	3	0	0	0	0	0	0
Benjamin Lessennes	Belgium	2018	0	18	18	0	0	0	0	48
Benjamin Leuchter	Germany	2019	0	30	30	0	1	1	2	111
Billy Lo Kai Fung^	Macau	2018–2019	0	6	6	0	0	0	0	0
Qinghua Ma	China	2018–2019, 2022	0	51	46	0	1	5	1	237
Gilles Magnus	Belgium	2020–2022	0	48	48	4	4	12	4	521
Norbert Michelisz†	Hungary	2018–2022	1; 2019	108	106	8	8	22	8	1079
Mikhail Mityaev^	Russia	2021	0	2	2	0	0	0	0	0
Ritomo Miyata^	Japan	2019	0	3	3	0	0	0	0	0
Tiago Monteiro	Portugal	2018–2022	0	81	79	1	2	4	1	333
Gianni Morbidelli	Italy	2018	0	15	13	0	0	0	0	0
Yvan Muller	France	2018–2022	0	104	100	5	8	29	2	1076
Dániel Nagy	Hungary	2018, 2022	0	17	17	0	0	1	1	98
Norbert Nagy	Hungary	2018	0	30	30	0	0	1	0	18
Dylan O'Keeffe^	Australia	2020	0	2	2	0	0	0	0	0
João Paulo de Oliveira^	Brazil	2019	0	3	3	0	0	0	1	0
Bernhard van Oranje-Nassau^	Netherlands	2018	0	3	3	0	0	0	0	0
Pepe Oriola	Spain	2018	0	30	30	0	1	7	2	245
Aurélien Panis	France	2018–2019	0	60	60	0	0	1	1	182
Andy Priaulx	United Kingdom	2019	0	30	30	0	1	1	1	122
René Rast^	Germany	2018	0	3	2	0	0	0	0	10
Kris Richard^	Switzerland	2018	0	3	3	0	0	0	0	0
José Rodrigues^	Portugal	2018	0	3	3	0	0	0	0	0
José Manuel Sapag^	Argentina	2020	0	6	5	0	0	0	0	0
Timo Scheider	Germany	2018	0	12	12	0	0	1	0	24
Gordon Shedden	United Kingdom	2018–2019	0	57	57	1	1	2	0	157
Filipe de Souza^	Macau	2018	0	3	3	0	0	0	0	0
Andrej Studenič^	Slovakia	2018	0	3	3	0	0	0	0	0
Hafizh Syahrin^	Malaysia	2019	0	3	3	0	0	0	0	0
Zsolt Szabó	Hungary	2018	0	30	26	0	0	0	0	4
James Tang^	Hong Kong	2019	0	3	0	0	0	0	0	0
Gabriele Tarquini†	Italy	2018–2021	1; 2018	92	89	2	7	17	7	721
Attila Tassi	Hungary	2018–2022	0	81	79	1	1	4	1	335
Tamás Tenke^	Hungary	2019	0	3	3	0	0	0	1	0
James Thompson	United Kingdom	2018	0	15	13	0	0	1	0	36
Ryuichiro Tomita^	Japan	2019	0	3	3	0	0	0	0	0
Kevin Tse^	Macau	2018	0	3	3	0	0	0	0	0
Terence Tse^	Hong Kong	2019	0	3	0	0	0	0	0	0
Santiago Urrutia	Uruguay	2020–2022	0	44	40	3	5	14	2	473
Rui Valente^	Macau	2018	0	3	0	0	0	0	0	0
Michael Verhagen^	Netherlands	2018	0	3	3	0	0	0	0	0
Jean-Karl Vernay	France	2018–2021	0	92	92	2	7	17	7	827
Frédéric Vervisch	Belgium	2018–2019, 2021	0	76	76	2	4	17	11	617
Anson Wong^	Hong Kong	2019	0	3	0	0	0	0	0	0
Jack Young	United Kingdom	2020	0	4	3	0	0	0	0	0
