= Michael Briggs (racing driver) =

South African racing driver (born 1966)

- Born: Michael Briggs; July 24, 1966 (age 59)
- Citizenship: South Africa
- Occupations: Engineer, Racing driver, Racing automobile driver

Michael Briggs (born 24 July 1966 in Port Elizabeth) is a South African racing driver.

== Career ==
Briggs started saloon racing in 1987 with the national Group N Saloon Car Championship, winning the title five times. In 1991, he won the South African GTI Championship. He had great success racing in the South African Touring Car Championship for Opel, where he was crowned champion in 1993 and 1995, and was runner-up in 1994. For the final eight rounds of the British Touring Car Championship he replaced injured driver James Thompson for Vauxhall Sport and finished fifteenth in the championship.

From 1997 to 2002, Briggs competed in the SATCC, the Malaysian Supercar Championship (champion in 2000) and the Asian Touring Car Championship (ATCC). His last season in the ATCC came in 2006 for Team PETRONAS Syntium Proton in a Proton Impian, finishing in third.

== Racing record ==
=== Complete British Touring Car Championship results ===
(key) (Races in bold indicate pole position) (Races in italics indicate fastest lap)

| Year | Team | Car | 1 | 2 | 3 | 4 | 5 | 6 | 7 | 8 | 9 | 10 | 11 | 12 | 13 | 14 | 15 | 16 | 17 | 18 | 19 | 20 | 21 | 22 | 23 | 24 | 25 | DC | Pts |
|---|---|---|---|---|---|---|---|---|---|---|---|---|---|---|---|---|---|---|---|---|---|---|---|---|---|---|---|---|---|
| 1995 | Vauxhall Sport | Vauxhall Cavalier 16v | DON; 1 | DON; 2 | BRH; 1 | BRH; 2 | THR; 1 | THR; 2 | SIL; 1 | SIL; 2 | OUL; 1 | OUL; 2 | BRH; 1 | BRH; 2 | DON; 1 | DON; 2 | SIL | KNO; 1 | KNO; 2 | BRH; 1; 6 | BRH; 2; 5 | SNE; 1; 7 | SNE; 2; 5 | OUL; 1; 12 | OUL; 2; 8 | SIL; 1; 6 | SIL; 2 Ret | 15th | 35 |

=== Complete Australian Super Touring Championship results ===
| Year | Team | Car | 1 | 2 | 3 | 4 | 5 | 6 | 7 | 8 | 9 | 10 | 11 | 12 | 13 | 14 | 15 | 16 | DC | Pts |
|---|---|---|---|---|---|---|---|---|---|---|---|---|---|---|---|---|---|---|---|---|
| 1997 | Team Petronas PX2 | Ford Mondeo Ghia | LAK; 1 | LAK; 2 | PHI; 1 | PHI; 2 | CAL; 1 Ret | CAL; 2; 7 | AMA; 1 | AMA; 2 | WIN; 1 | WIN; 2 | MAL; 1 | MAL; 2 | LAK; 1 | LAK; 2 | AMA; 1 | AMA; 2 | 19th | 4 |
