= 1995 British Touring Car Championship =

38th season of the British Touring Car Championship

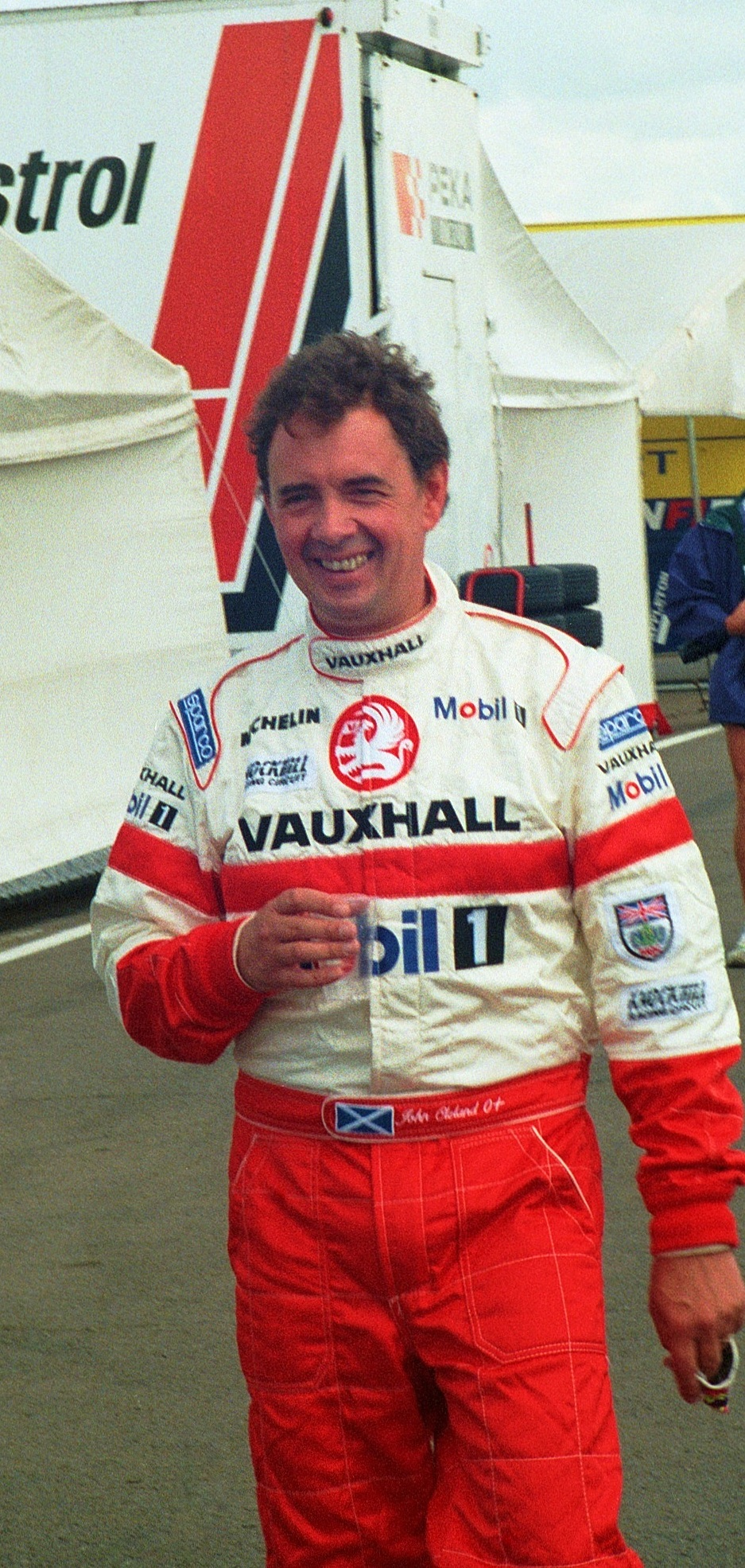
John Cleland, the 1995 British Touring Car Champion.

The 1995 Auto Trader RAC British Touring Car Championship was won by John Cleland in a Vauxhall Cavalier. The Independents' title was won by Matt Neal in his Team Dynamics Ford Mondeo with fourteen class wins.

== Season summary ==
All the race weekends were now double header meetings, with full points awarded at each race. The exception was the British Grand Prix support round.

Following the controversies over aerodynamic aids in 1994 first used by Alfa Romeo, TOCA announced wings and spoilers were eligible for all the cars in the new season.

After their domination in 1994, Alfa Corse went back to contesting the Italian Supertouring Championship, leaving Prodrive to run the works Alfa team. Derek Warwick was signed to drive alongside Giampiero Simoni with champion Gabriele Tarquini returning in a third car at Oulton Park. He replaced Simoni after the Silverstone Circuit GP support round but results continued to be disappointing and Alfa Romeo withdrew from the championship at the end of the year.

TWR Volvo replaced the 850 estate with the 850 saloon. The cars were instantly on the pace with Rickard Rydell winning round two and teammate Tim Harvey doubling up at the next round. Rydell remained in championship contention until the penultimate round, taking three more victories in the process whilst Harvey dropped back in the standings and at times was unconvincing compared to Rydell.

WilliamsF1 setup Williams Touring Car Engineering and took over development of Renault Laguna whilst Sodemo Moteurs supplied engines. 1994 runner up Alain Menu was retained and took more wins than any other driver during the season and he partnered by 1991 champion Will Hoy moving from Toyota. Towards the end of the year the Laguna was the class of the field, winning five of the last six races which helped Renault to take the manufacturers title for the first time.

Andy Rouse Engineering ran Ford's works effort for a third season with the V6 Mondeo. Double touring car world cup winner Paul Radisich was joined by British F3 championship winner Kelvin Burt. The car was competitive in the early part of the year but fell back in the development race. The powerful but heavy V6 contributed to major front tyre wear that saw the cars become mobile chicanes as races progressed. Radisich in particular struggled, scoring just 2 points in the final 10 races.

Vauxhall announced that the Cavalier was to be replaced by the new Vectra at the end of the season, so 1995 was the last hurrah for the venerable car. John Cleland was joined by James Thompson who replaced Jeff Allam, and despite the Volvo and Renault giving strong competition, Cleland's consistency and the Cavalier's reliability took the driver's and teams championships. Thompson crashed heavily during testing for the Knockhill Circuit round and injuries sustained would see him miss the remaining rounds. Jeff Allam was brought in as a last minute replacement for Knockhill and then Michael Briggs, the 1995 South African Touring Car Championship winner, for the rest of the season.

Team Schnitzer were heavily involved in other touring car championships around the world in 1995, with 1994 BTCC drivers Joachim Winkelhock competing in the German Supertouring championship which he won, while Steve Soper raced in Japan and took the title there. BMW instead employed it's UK arm to take on the challenge, with factory drivers Johnny Cecotto and David Brabham. The season was a disaster by BMWs standard however with no wins or even a podium finish to their credit.

Toyota retained Julian Bailey and Tim Sugden with Toyota Team Europe engineering the Carina with the backing of a major new sponsor, Mobil 1. Both drivers regularly ran near the higher end of the midfield and at Snetterton Circuit the team debuted a brand new right hand drive car, driven by Sugden, then Bailey for the remainder of the year. The new car was a significant step forward allowing Bailey to challenge the top 3 teams but it wasn't enough to stop Toyota pulling the plug at the end of the season.

Total Team Peugeot once again entered the Peugeot 405 Mi16, now in its final year. Patrick Watts remained with the team for a second season and he was joined by Simon Harrison the 1994 National Saloon Car Championship winner. Harrison struggled, scoring points on just 4 occasions. Watts was more competitive, finishing on the podium twice.

Honda joined the championship with Motor Sport Developments entering the Accord driven by David Leslie and double independents champion James Kaye. Results steadily improved as the season progressed and Leslie in particular was able to mix it at the front of the pack, scoring a podium at Oulton Park.

In the Independents Championship, Matt Neal dominated the season and easily won his second Independent title driving a 1994 Andy Rouse Engineering built Ford Mondeo run by family outfit Team Dynamics. Mint Motorsport entered a 1993 Mondeo, also built by Andy Rouse engineering for Richard Kaye, making his BTCC debut and finishing second in the independent standings. Finishing third Nigel Smith competing in his second season, once again racing his 1993 Ecurie Ecosse Vauxhall Cavalier. Hamish Irvine finished fourth in his 1994 Peugeot 405. 1990 champion Robb Gravett entered the opening rounds at Donington Park in a 1993 Vauxhall Cavalier before returning at the Silverstone GP support race in an ex-STW Ford Mondeo. At Snetterton he scored the first outright podium finish for an independent driver in the 2 litre era. Australian Charlie Cox (racing) also entered a Ford Mondeo. A strategic tyre choice saw him take fifth overall at Brands Hatch in April. At the following round he was involved in a huge crash destroying the car and forcing him to miss a number of races. He returned at Brands Hatch in a rebuilt car, the first hatchback Mondeo to race in the UK.

== Teams and drivers ==
Team	Car	No.	Drivers	Rounds
Manufacturers
(Italy) Alfa Romeo Old Spice Racing	Alfa Romeo 155 TS	1	(Italy) Gabriele Tarquini	5, 9–13
(Italy) Alfa Romeo Old Spice Racing	Alfa Romeo 155 TS	5	(Italy) Giampiero Simoni	1–8
(Italy) Alfa Romeo Old Spice Racing	Alfa Romeo 155 TS	55	(United Kingdom) Derek Warwick	All
(France) Williams Renault Dealer Racing	Renault Laguna	2	(Switzerland) Alain Menu	All
(France) Williams Renault Dealer Racing	Renault Laguna	22	(United Kingdom) Will Hoy	All
(United Kingdom) Valvoline Team Mondeo	Ford Mondeo Ghia	3	(New Zealand) Paul Radisich	All
(United Kingdom) Valvoline Team Mondeo	Ford Mondeo Ghia	33	(United Kingdom) Kelvin Burt	All
(United Kingdom) Vauxhall Sport	Vauxhall Cavalier 16v	4	(United Kingdom) John Cleland	All
(United Kingdom) Vauxhall Sport	Vauxhall Cavalier 16v	10	(United Kingdom) Jeff Allam	9
(United Kingdom) Vauxhall Sport	Vauxhall Cavalier 16v	14	(United Kingdom) James Thompson	1–8
(United Kingdom) Vauxhall Sport	Vauxhall Cavalier 16v	24	(South Africa) Mike Briggs	10–13
(France) Total Team Peugeot	Peugeot 405 Mi16	8	(United Kingdom) Patrick Watts	All
(France) Total Team Peugeot	Peugeot 405 Mi16	18	(United Kingdom) Simon Harrison	All
(Sweden) Volvo 850 Racing	Volvo 850 20v	9	(United Kingdom) Tim Harvey	All
(Sweden) Volvo 850 Racing	Volvo 850 20v	15	(Sweden) Rickard Rydell	All
(Japan) Team Toyota GB	Toyota Carina E	11	(United Kingdom) Julian Bailey	All
(Japan) Team Toyota GB	Toyota Carina E	12	(United Kingdom) Tim Sugden	All
(Germany) BMW Motorsport Team	BMW 320i	16	(Venezuela) Johnny Cecotto	All
(Germany) BMW Motorsport Team	BMW 320i	17	(Australia) David Brabham	All
(Japan) Honda Team MSD	Honda Accord	20	(United Kingdom) David Leslie	All
(Japan) Honda Team MSD	Honda Accord	21	(United Kingdom) James Kaye	All
Independents
(United Kingdom) Thames Ford Dealers	Ford Mondeo Ghia	19	(Australia) Charlie Cox	1–3
(United Kingdom) Thames Ford Dealers	Ford Mondeo	19	(Australia) Charlie Cox	10–13
(United Kingdom) Mint Motorsport	Ford Mondeo Ghia	23	(United Kingdom) Richard Kaye	All
(United Kingdom) HMSO Bookshops	Vauxhall Cavalier 16v	25	(United Kingdom) Nigel Smith	All
(United Kingdom) SCB Vehicle Dismantlers	Peugeot 405 Mi16	26	(United Kingdom) Hamish Irvine	All
(United Kingdom) Foesport	Ford Mondeo Ghia	27	(United Kingdom) Robb Gravett	8–13
(United Kingdom) Roy Kennedy Racing	Vauxhall Cavalier 16v	30	(United Kingdom) Robb Gravett	1
(Sweden) Team Magic	Mazda 323F	32	(Sweden) Slim Borgudd	DNS*
(United Kingdom) Team Dynamics	Ford Mondeo Ghia	77	(United Kingdom) Matt Neal	All

- Team Magic was entered for the season on the initial entry listing, but did not compete due to budget issues.

== Race calendar and results ==
All races were held in the United Kingdom.

Round		Circuit	Date	Pole position	Fastest lap	Winning driver	Winning team	Winning independent
1	R1	Donington Park (Grand Prix), Leicestershire	2 April	(Sweden) Rickard Rydell	(United Kingdom) John Cleland	(United Kingdom) John Cleland	Vauxhall Sport	(United Kingdom) Matt Neal
1	R2	Donington Park (Grand Prix), Leicestershire	2 April	(Sweden) Rickard Rydell	(Sweden) Rickard Rydell	(Sweden) Rickard Rydell	Volvo 850 Racing	(United Kingdom) Matt Neal
2	R3	Brands Hatch (Indy), Kent	17 April	(Sweden) Rickard Rydell	(New Zealand) Paul Radisich	(United Kingdom) Tim Harvey	Volvo 850 Racing	(Australia) Charlie Cox
2	R4	Brands Hatch (Indy), Kent	17 April	(Sweden) Rickard Rydell	(United Kingdom) Kelvin Burt	(United Kingdom) Tim Harvey	Volvo 850 Racing	(United Kingdom) Matt Neal
3	R5	Thruxton Circuit, Hampshire	8 May	(Switzerland) Alain Menu	(Switzerland) Alain Menu	(Switzerland) Alain Menu	Williams Renault Dealer Racing	(United Kingdom) Nigel Smith
3	R6	Thruxton Circuit, Hampshire	8 May	(United Kingdom) James Thompson	(United Kingdom) James Thompson	(United Kingdom) James Thompson	Vauxhall Sport	(United Kingdom) Nigel Smith
4	R7	Silverstone Circuit (National), Northamptonshire	14 May	(Sweden) Rickard Rydell	(New Zealand) Paul Radisich	(Sweden) Rickard Rydell	Volvo 850 Racing	(United Kingdom) Matt Neal
4	R8	Silverstone Circuit (National), Northamptonshire	14 May	(Sweden) Rickard Rydell	(New Zealand) Paul Radisich	(New Zealand) Paul Radisich	Valvoline Team Mondeo	(United Kingdom) Matt Neal
5	R9	Oulton Park (International), Cheshire	29 May	(United Kingdom) James Thompson	(Switzerland) Alain Menu	(Sweden) Rickard Rydell	Volvo 850 Racing	(United Kingdom) Nigel Smith
5	R10	Oulton Park (International), Cheshire	29 May	(Sweden) Rickard Rydell	(Switzerland) Alain Menu	(Switzerland) Alain Menu	Williams Renault Dealer Racing	(United Kingdom) Matt Neal
6	R11	Brands Hatch (Grand Prix), Kent	11 June	(Switzerland) Alain Menu	(United Kingdom) John Cleland	(Switzerland) Alain Menu	Williams Renault Dealer Racing	(United Kingdom) Hamish Irvine
6	R12	Brands Hatch (Grand Prix), Kent	11 June	(Switzerland) Alain Menu	(Switzerland) Alain Menu	(United Kingdom) John Cleland	Vauxhall Sport	(United Kingdom) Richard Kaye
7	R13	Donington Park (Grand Prix), Leicestershire	25 June	(United Kingdom) John Cleland	(United Kingdom) John Cleland	(United Kingdom) John Cleland	Vauxhall Sport	(United Kingdom) Nigel Smith
7	R14	Donington Park (Grand Prix), Leicestershire	25 June	(United Kingdom) John Cleland	(United Kingdom) John Cleland	(United Kingdom) John Cleland	Vauxhall Sport	(United Kingdom) Richard Kaye
8	R15	Silverstone Circuit (Grand Prix), Northamptonshire	16 July	(United Kingdom) John Cleland	(United Kingdom) Julian Bailey	(United Kingdom) John Cleland	Vauxhall Sport	(United Kingdom) Robb Gravett
9	R16	Knockhill Circuit, Fife	30 July	(Sweden) Rickard Rydell	(Sweden) Rickard Rydell	(Sweden) Rickard Rydell	Volvo 850 Racing	(United Kingdom) Matt Neal
9	R17	Knockhill Circuit, Fife	30 July	(Sweden) Rickard Rydell	(United Kingdom) Tim Harvey	(Switzerland) Alain Menu	Williams Renault Dealer Racing	(United Kingdom) Matt Neal
10	R18	Brands Hatch (Indy), Kent	13 August	(Sweden) Rickard Rydell	(Sweden) Rickard Rydell	(United Kingdom) Will Hoy	Williams Renault Dealer Racing	(United Kingdom) Matt Neal
10	R19	Brands Hatch (Indy), Kent	13 August	(Sweden) Rickard Rydell	(United Kingdom) John Cleland	(United Kingdom) John Cleland	Vauxhall Sport	(United Kingdom) Matt Neal
11	R20	Snetterton Circuit, Norfolk	28 August	(Sweden) Rickard Rydell	(Venezuela) Johnny Cecotto	(United Kingdom) Kelvin Burt	Valvoline Team Mondeo	(United Kingdom) Robb Gravett
11	R21	Snetterton Circuit, Norfolk	28 August	(Sweden) Rickard Rydell	(Sweden) Rickard Rydell	(United Kingdom) Will Hoy	Williams Renault Dealer Racing	(United Kingdom) Matt Neal
12	R22	Oulton Park (Fosters), Cheshire	10 September	(Switzerland) Alain Menu	(Switzerland) Alain Menu	(Switzerland) Alain Menu	Williams Renault Dealer Racing	(United Kingdom) Matt Neal
12	R23	Oulton Park (Fosters), Cheshire	10 September	(Switzerland) Alain Menu	(Switzerland) Alain Menu	(Switzerland) Alain Menu	Williams Renault Dealer Racing	(United Kingdom) Matt Neal
13	R24	Silverstone Circuit (National), Northamptonshire	24 September	(United Kingdom) John Cleland	(Switzerland) Alain Menu	(Switzerland) Alain Menu	Williams Renault Dealer Racing	(United Kingdom) Richard Kaye
13	R25	Silverstone Circuit (National), Northamptonshire	24 September	(Switzerland) Alain Menu	(Switzerland) Alain Menu	(United Kingdom) Will Hoy	Williams Renault Dealer Racing	(United Kingdom) Matt Neal

== Championship standings ==
Points tables for the various titles as follows:

Points system
**1st**	**2nd**	**3rd**	**4th**	**5th**	**6th**	**7th**	**8th**	**9th**	**10th**
24	18	12	10	8	6	4	3	2	1

Note: bold signifies pole position, italics signifies fastest lap.

=== Drivers Championship ===
Pos.	Driver	DON		BRH		THR		SIL		OUL		BRH		DON		SIL	KNO		BRH		SNE		OUL		SIL		Pts
1	(United Kingdom) John Cleland	1	2	Ret	Ret	2	5	3	5	2	3	2	1	**1**	**1**	**1**	5	6	3	1	13	3	3	2	**3**	3	348
2	(Switzerland) Alain Menu	2	4	7	9	**1**	2	Ret	4	3	1	**1**	**3**	3	4	16	Ret	1	4	18	Ret	10	**1**	**1**	1	**2**	305
3	(Sweden) Rickard Rydell	**4**	**1**	**13**	**3**	9	4	**1**	**2**	1	**2**	7	DNS	2	6	17	**1**	**2**	**2**	**3**	**14**	**Ret**	5	10	7	Ret	255
4	(United Kingdom) Will Hoy	6	5	9	7	Ret	Ret	5	15	Ret	18	4	4	12	8	2	Ret	Ret	1	2	12	1	2	Ret	2	1	195
5	(United Kingdom) Tim Harvey	8	3	1	1	15	7	7	3	8	15	3	5	10	12	Ret	2	3	7	7	Ret	2	Ret	5	10	7	176
6	(New Zealand) Paul Radisich	3	6	2	DNS	Ret	6	2	1	Ret	5	Ret	7	5	2	6	Ret	Ret	14	Ret	9	Ret	Ret	12	18	12	130
7	(United Kingdom) James Thompson	7	7	Ret	2	Ret	**1**	4	Ret	**6**	4	Ret	2	4	5	3											124
8	(United Kingdom) Kelvin Burt	Ret	13	3	4	Ret	3	Ret	7	DNS	6	Ret	14	9	3	5	3	Ret	13	11	1	12	10	7	4	Ret	117
9	(United Kingdom) Julian Bailey	Ret	Ret	6	8	7	8	Ret	DNS	4	9	6	6	6	7	4	6	9	9	Ret	11	6	Ret	4	Ret	5	94
10	(United Kingdom) Patrick Watts	13	11	8	DNS	3	Ret	6	10	Ret	13	5	8	15	Ret	10	DNS	11	11	6	2	Ret	Ret	Ret	11	8	61
11	(United Kingdom) David Leslie	Ret	Ret	17	17	8	12	9	8	DNS	DNS	12	18	7	9	12	11	7	17	10	8	8	6	3	5	4	61
12	(Venezuela) Johnny Cecotto	5	8	11	5	Ret	11	11	12	9	Ret	10	9	Ret	Ret	DNS	4	Ret	5	Ret	10	Ret	Ret	6	Ret	Ret	49
13	(Australia) David Brabham	12	12	4	6	5	Ret	8	11	10	8	Ret	10	11	11	7	DNS	4	Ret	Ret	16	17	11	Ret	9	Ret	48
14	(United Kingdom) Tim Sugden	9	Ret	14	10	4	Ret	Ret	6	Ret	11	Ret	DNS	8	13	8	7	10	12	9	6	7	Ret	Ret	13	6	48
15	(South Africa) Michael Briggs																		6	5	7	5	12	8	6	Ret	35
16	(Italy) Gabriele Tarquini									11	Ret						Ret	8	Ret	4	4	Ret	4	13	Ret	15	33
17	(Italy) Giampiero Simoni	10	9	10	12	6	10	Ret	9	5	7	9	12	Ret	Ret	11											27
18	(United Kingdom) James Kaye	11	10	19	14	16	13	10	13	14	10	13	19	14	10	Ret	Ret	5	10	8	18	9	7	9	16	9	26
19	(United Kingdom) Derek Warwick	Ret	Ret	12	Ret	12	Ret	16	17	DNS	DNS	8	11	13	Ret	9	Ret	16	8	14	Ret	13	8	Ret	8	10	15
20	(United Kingdom) Robb Gravett	19	15													13	10	14	19	13	3	Ret	16	DNS	15	Ret	13
21	(United Kingdom) Matt Neal	15	14	16	13	Ret	15	13	14	13	14	Ret	DNS	Ret	Ret	14	9	13	15	12	15	4	13	11	17	11	12
22	(United Kingdom) Simon Harrison	14	17	15	11	10	9	12	16	7	12	11	13	Ret	Ret	15	Ret	Ret	Ret	DNS	19	11	9	Ret	Ret	DNS	9
23	(Australia) Charlie Cox	18	Ret	5	15	13	DNS												21	15	Ret	16	Ret	DNS	Ret	14	8
24	(United Kingdom) Richard Kaye	17	Ret	20	19	14	16	14	18	15	17	15	15	17	14	Ret	13	15	18	17	5	14	15	15	12	13	8
25	(United Kingdom) Jeff Allam																8	12									3
26	(United Kingdom) Nigel Smith	16	16	18	16	11	14	Ret	Ret	12	16	16	17	16	Ret	Ret	12	18	16	16	17	15	14	14	Ret	DNS	0
27	(United Kingdom) Hamish Irvine	Ret	18	Ret	18	Ret	DNS	15	Ret	16	Ret	14	16	18	15	18	14	17	20	Ret	Ret	DNS	17	16	14	Ret	0
Pos.	Driver	DON		BRH		THR		SIL		OUL		BRH		DON		SIL	KNO		BRH		SNE		OUL		SIL		Pts

=== Total Cup for Privateers ===
Pos.	Driver	DON		BRH		THR		SIL		OUL		BRH		DON		SIL	KNO		BRH		SNE		OUL		SIL		Pts
1	(United Kingdom) Matt Neal	**15**	**14**	16	**13**	**Ret**	**15**	**13**	**14**	**13**	**14**	**Ret**	**DNS**	**Ret**	**Ret**	**14**	9	**13**	**15**	**12**	15	**4**	**13**	**11**	**17**	**11**	430
2	(United Kingdom) Richard Kaye	17	Ret	**20**	19	14	16	14	18	15	17	15	15	17	14	Ret	13	15	18	17	5	14	15	15	12	13	342
3	(United Kingdom) Nigel Smith	16	16	18	16	11	14	Ret	Ret	12	16	16	17	16	Ret	Ret	12	18	16	16	17	15	14	14	Ret	DNS	298
4	(United Kingdom) Hamish Irvine	Ret	18	Ret	18	Ret	DNS	15	Ret	16	Ret	14	16	18	15	18	14	17	20	Ret	Ret	DNS	17	16	14	Ret	188
5	(United Kingdom) Robb Gravett	19	15													13	**10**	14	19	13	**3**	Ret	16	DNS	15	Ret	160
6	(Australia) Charlie Cox	18	Ret	5	15	13	DNS												21	15	Ret	16	Ret	DNS	Ret	14	110
Pos.	Driver	DON		BRH		THR		SIL		OUL		BRH		DON		SIL	KNO		BRH		SNE		OUL		SIL		Pts

=== Manufacturers Championship ===
Pos	Manufacturer	DON		BRH		THR		SIL		OUL		BRH		DON		SIL	KNO		BRH		SNE		OUL		SIL		Pts
1	Renault / Williams Renault Dealer Team	2	4	7	7	1	2	5	4	3	1	1	3	3	4	2	Ret	1	1	2	12	1	1	1	1	1	419
2	Vauxhall / Vauxhall Sport	1	2	Ret	2	2	1	3	5	2	3	2	1	1	1	1	5	6	3	1	7	3	3	2	3	3	414
3	Volvo / Volvo 850 Racing	4	1	1	1	9	4	1	2	1	2	3	5	2	6	17	1	2	2	3	14	2	5	5	7	7	359
4	Ford / Valvoline Team Mondeo	3	6	2	4	Ret	3	2	1	Ret	5	Ret	7	5	2	5	3	Ret	13	11	1	12	10	7	4	12	236
5	Toyota / Team Toyota GB	9	Ret	6	8	4	8	Ret	6	4	9	6	6	6	7	4	6	9	9	9	6	6	Ret	4	13	5	172
6	BMW / BMW Motorsport Team	5	8	4	5	5	11	8	11	9	8	10	9	11	11	7	4	4	5	Ret	10	17	11	6	9	Ret	144
7	Honda / Honda Team MSD	11	10	17	14	8	12	9	8	14	10	12	18	7	9	12	11	5	10	8	8	8	6	3	5	4	136
8	Alfa Romeo / Alfa Romeo Old Spice Racing	10	9	10	12	6	10	16	9	5	7	8	11	13	Ret	9	Ret	8	8	4	4	13	4	13	8	10	132
9	Peugeot / Total Team Peugeot	13	11	8	11	3	9	6	10	7	12	5	8	15	Ret	10	Ret	11	11	6	2	11	9	Ret	11	8	127
Pos	Manufacturer	DON		BRH		THR		SIL		OUL		BRH		DON		SIL	KNO		BRH		SNE		OUL		SIL		Pts

=== Teams Championship ===
Pos	Team	DON		BRH		THR		SIL		OUL		BRH		DON		SIL	KNO		BRH		SNE		OUL		SIL		Pts
1	Vauxhall Sport	1	2	Ret	2	2	1	3	5	2	3	2	1	1	1	1	5	6	3	1	7	3	3	2	3	3	510
1	Vauxhall Sport	7	7	Ret	Ret	Ret	5	4	Ret	6	4	Ret	2	4	5	3	8	12	6	5	13	5	12	8	6	Ret	510
2	Williams Renault Dealer Team	2	4	7	7	1	2	5	4	3	1	1	3	3	4	2	Ret	1	1	2	12	1	1	1	1	1	500
2	Williams Renault Dealer Team	6	5	9	9	Ret	Ret	Ret	15	Ret	18	4	4	12	8	16	Ret	Ret	4	18	Ret	10	2	Ret	2	2	500
3	Volvo 850 Racing	4	1	1	1	9	4	1	2	1	2	3	5	2	6	17	1	2	2	3	14	2	5	5	7	7	431
3	Volvo 850 Racing	8	3	13	3	15	7	7	3	8	15	7	DNS	10	12	Ret	2	3	7	7	Ret	Ret	Ret	10	10	Ret	431
4	Valvoline Team Mondeo	3	6	2	4	Ret	3	2	1	Ret	5	Ret	7	5	2	5	3	Ret	13	11	1	12	10	7	4	12	247
4	Valvoline Team Mondeo	Ret	13	3	DNS	Ret	6	Ret	7	DNS	6	Ret	14	9	3	6	Ret	Ret	14	Ret	9	Ret	Ret	12	18	Ret	247
5	Team Toyota GB	9	Ret	6	8	4	8	Ret	6	4	9	6	6	6	7	4	6	9	9	9	6	6	Ret	4	13	5	142
5	Team Toyota GB	Ret	Ret	14	10	7	Ret	Ret	DNS	Ret	11	Ret	DNS	8	13	8	7	10	12	Ret	11	7	Ret	Ret	Ret	6	142
6	BMW Motorsport Team	5	8	4	5	5	11	8	11	9	8	10	9	11	11	7	4	4	5	Ret	10	17	11	6	9	Ret	97
6	BMW Motorsport Team	12	12	11	6	Ret	Ret	11	12	10	Ret	Ret	10	Ret	Ret	DNS	DNS	Ret	Ret	Ret	16	Ret	Ret	Ret	Ret	Ret	97
7	Honda Team MSD	11	10	17	14	8	12	9	8	14	10	12	18	7	9	12	11	5	10	8	8	8	6	3	5	4	87
7	Honda Team MSD	Ret	Ret	19	17	16	13	10	13	DNS	DNS	13	19	14	10	Ret	Ret	7	17	10	18	9	7	9	16	9	87
8	Alfa Romeo Old Spice Racing	10	9	10	12	6	10	16	9	5	7	8	11	13	Ret	9	Ret	8	8	4	4	13	4	13	8	10	75
8	Alfa Romeo Old Spice Racing	Ret	Ret	12	Ret	12	Ret	Ret	17	11	Ret	9	12	Ret	Ret	11	Ret	12	Ret	14	Ret	Ret	8	Ret	Ret	15	75
9	Total Team Peugeot	13	11	8	11	3	9	6	10	7	12	5	8	15	Ret	10	Ret	11	11	6	2	11	9	Ret	11	8	70
9	Total Team Peugeot	14	17	15	DNS	10	Ret	12	16	Ret	13	11	13	Ret	Ret	15	DNS	Ret	Ret	DNS	19	Ret	Ret	Ret	Ret	DNS	70
10	Foesport															13	10	14	19	13	3	Ret	16	DNS	15	Ret	13
11	Team Dynamics	15	14	16	13	Ret	15	13	14	13	14	Ret	DNS	Ret	Ret	14	9	13	15	12	15	4	13	11	17	11	12
12	Thames Ford Dealers	18	Ret	5	15	13	DNS												21	15	Ret	16	Ret	DNS	Ret	14	8
13	Mint Motorsport	17	Ret	20	19	14	16	14	18	15	17	15	15	17	14	Ret	13	15	18	17	5	14	15	15	12	13	8
14	HMSO Bookshops	16	16	18	16	11	14	Ret	Ret	12	16	16	17	16	Ret	Ret	12	18	16	16	17	15	14	14	Ret	DNS	0
15	SCB Vehicle Dismantlers	Ret	18	Ret	18	Ret	DNS	15	Ret	16	Ret	14	16	18	15	18	14	17	20	Ret	Ret	DNS	17	16	14	Ret	0
16	Roy Kennedy Racing	19	15																								0
Pos	Team	DON		BRH		THR		SIL		OUL		BRH		DON		SIL	KNO		BRH		SNE		OUL		SIL		Pts

== Bibliography ==
- Fearnley, Paul (1 December 1995). Fearnley, Paul (ed.). Autocourse British Motorsport Year 1995-96. Richmond, UK: Hazleton Publishing. p. 160. ISBN 978-1-874557-61-6.
