= World Touring Car Cup =

International touring car championship

- Category: Touring cars
- Country: International
- Inaugural season: 2018
- Folded: 2022
- Tyre suppliers: Goodyear
- Last Drivers' champion: (Spain) Mikel Azcona
- Last Teams' champion: (Italy) BRC Racing Team

The FIA World Touring Car Cup (abbreviated to WTCR, referring to the use of TCR regulations) was an international touring car championship promoted by Eurosport Events and sanctioned by the Fédération Internationale de l'Automobile (FIA). Following the 2017 season, an agreement was reached for the World Touring Car Championship (WTCC) to become WTCR and use the TCR technical regulations. As factory teams were not allowed to compete in WTCR, the series lost the 'World Championship' status of the WTCC, instead becoming a 'Cup'.

== History ==
=== Touring Car World Cup (1993–1995) ===
In 1993, with the high popularity of the Super Touring category, the FIA hosted the FIA Touring Car World Cup — an annual event for touring car drivers hailing from national championships all over the world. The 1993 race at Monza was won by New Zealand's Paul Radisich, at the wheel of a Ford Mondeo ahead of Nicola Larini's Alfa Romeo 155, with no manufacturer title awarded. The race was run for two more years, (won by Paul Radisich again in 1994 at Donington Park in a Ford Mondeo, manufacturer title went to BMW, and Frank Biela in 1995 at Paul Ricard in an Audi A4 Quattro, and manufacturer title went to Audi). A similar event was planned for 1996 at the A1 Ring, Austria, but was cancelled due to a low number of provisional entries (10 cars). It was never brought back thereafter.

=== World Touring Car Cup (2018–2022) ===
On 6 December 2017, during the FIA's World Motorsport Council in Paris, it was approved the formation of the new World Touring Car Cup starting from 2018. The new series would utilize the TCR rules, which have been in use in numerous national and international touring car racing series, including the TCR International Series. As a result of the formation of the WTCR, both the WTCC in its current format and the TCR International Series would be discontinued immediately.

A new format was introduced, with one qualifying session and one race on the first day and a three-phase qualifying session on the second day and two races, with the first one having the top 10 of the grid reversed.

In October 2022 it was reported that the series would be folding in its current format following the 2022 season, with any future change to the series being evaluated and announced at a later date.

==== Issues ====
The compensation weight system in WTCR – which assigns weight penalties to certain cars for their performance in certain situations – was often criticised, being deemed unnecessary given the series also utilised a Balance of Performance (BoP) system to equalise the performance of the participating cars. As a result of the system, several teams deliberately ordered their drivers to drive slower than possible in qualifying and/or race sessions in order to minimise the compensation weight penalty; often the teams who were best able to game the system had the best chances of success. Another byproduct of the system was a lack of overtaking, as often drivers weren't allowed to go faster to get past other cars when the weight penalties were also calculated from race lap times.

The series was also notorious for the politicking and team orders employed by some teams and their car providers, most notably BRC Racing Team/Hyundai and Cyan Racing/Lynk & Co. The politicking was generally focused on the Balance of Performance, which culminated in Hyundai instructing their customer teams to not participate at the 2020 Race of Germany and Cyan Racing leaving the series halfway through the 2022 season after unsatisfactory BoP.

=== TCR World Tour (2023–present) ===
Following various difficulties concerning the WTCR format, WTCR was revised into the world tour format starting from 2023 season. TCR World Tour calendar will consist of races picked from various regional and national TCR series world wide unlike the WTCR format which was based on a season calendar primarily independent from other TCR series.

== Rules ==
=== Car homologation ===
Cars had to be production models, with a minimum production of 5000 samples in a year. The engine was limited to a displacement of up to 2 liters, turbo charged, and with the aid of restrictors, to a maximum yield of 350 Hp. Each car was assigned a minimum racing weight which is used to balance the performances.

=== Scoring system ===
For the 2022 season, FIA WTCR races were awarded the following points, similar to MotoGP scoring system:

Position	1st	2nd	3rd	4th	5th	6th	7th	8th	9th	10th	11th	12th	13th	14th	15th
Race 1	30	23	19	16	14	12	10	8	7	6	5	4	3	2	1
Race 2	25	20	16	13	11	10	9	8	7	6	5	4	3	2	1
Qualifying	10	8	6	4	2										

== Broadcasters ==
In 2022, broadcasters of the FIA WTCR included:

- Europe: Eurosport (pan-Europe), Sport1 (Eastern Europe)
- China: Bilibili
- Japan: J Sports
- South Africa: SuperSport
- United States and Canada: Eurosport (Motor Trend), Bein Sports
- Latin America: Directv Sports
- Brazil: DSports
- The Netherlands RTL 7

== Cup statistics ==
Touring Car World Cup
	Drivers' Champions			Entrants' Champions		Nations Champions
Year	Driver	Team	Car	Manufacturer	Car	Nation
1993	(New Zealand) Paul Radisich	(United Kingdom) Ford Team Mondeo	Ford Mondeo	Not Held		Italy
1994	(New Zealand) Paul Radisich	(United Kingdom) Ford Team Mondeo	Ford Mondeo	(Germany) BMW	BMW 318i	Germany
1995	(Germany) Frank Biela	(France) Racing Organisation Course	Audi A4 Quattro	(Germany) Audi	Audi A4 Quattro	Not Held

World Touring Car Cup
Year	Winning driver / Team (car)		2nd / Team (car)		3rd / Team (car)		Winning team / Car	
2018	(Italy) Gabriele Tarquini	BRC Racing Team (Hyundai i30 N TCR)	(France) Yvan Muller	M Racing-YMR (Hyundai i30 N TCR)	(Argentina) Esteban Guerrieri	Münnich Motorsport (Honda Civic Type R TCR)	(France) M Racing-YMR	Hyundai i30 N
2019	(Hungary) Norbert Michelisz	BRC Racing Team (Hyundai i30 N TCR)	(Argentina) Esteban Guerrieri	Münnich Motorsport (Honda Civic Type R TCR)	(France) Yvan Muller	Cyan Racing (Lynk & Co 03 TCR)	(Sweden) Cyan Racing	Lynk & Co 03 TCR
2020	(France) Yann Ehrlacher	Cyan Racing (Lynk & Co 03 TCR)	(France) Yvan Muller	Cyan Racing (Lynk & Co 03 TCR)	(France) Jean-Karl Vernay	Team Mulsanne (Alfa Romeo Giulietta Veloce TCR)	(Sweden) Cyan Racing	Lynk & Co 03 TCR
2021	(France) Yann Ehrlacher	Cyan Racing (Lynk & Co 03 TCR)	(Belgium) Frédéric Vervisch	Comtoyou Racing (Audi RS 3 LMS TCR)	(France) Jean-Karl Vernay	Engstler Motorsport (Hyundai Elantra N TCR)	(Sweden) Cyan Racing	Lynk & Co 03 TCR
2022	(Spain) Mikel Azcona	BRC Racing Team (Hyundai Elantra N TCR)	(Argentina) Néstor Girolami	Münnich Motorsport (Honda Civic Type R TCR)	(France) Nathanaël Berthon	Comtoyou Racing (Audi RS 3 LMS TCR)	(Italy) BRC Racing Team	Hyundai Elantra N TCR

== Event winners ==
=== World Touring Car Cup (2018–2022) ===
Drivers
	Driver	Total
1	(Argentina) Esteban Guerrieri	10
2	(Sweden) Thed Björk	8
2	(Italy) Gabriele Tarquini	8
2	(France) Yvan Muller	8
2	(Hungary) Norbert Michelisz	8
6	(France) Jean-Karl Vernay	7
6	(Argentina) Néstor Girolami	7
6	(France) Yann Ehrlacher	7
6	(Spain) Mikel Azcona	7
10	(United Kingdom) Robert Huff	5
10	(Uruguay) Santiago Urrutia	5
12	(Belgium) Gilles Magnus	4
12	(Belgium) Frédéric Vervisch	4
14	(France) Nathanaël Berthon	3
14	(Sweden) Johan Kristoffersson	3
16	(Portugal) Tiago Monteiro	2
17	(Morocco) Mehdi Bennani	1
17	(Hungary) Attila Tassi	1
17	(Italy) Kevin Ceccon	1
17	(France) Aurélien Comte	1
17	(Slovakia) Mat'o Homola	1
17	(Netherlands) Nicky Catsburg	1
17	(Germany) Benjamin Leuchter	1
17	(Spain) Pepe Oriola	1
17	(China) Ma Qing Hua	1
17	(United Kingdom) Gordon Shedden	1
17	(United Kingdom) Andy Priaulx	1
17	(Netherlands) Tom Coronel	1

Teams
	Team	Total
1	(Germany) Münnich Motorsport	21
2	(Sweden) Cyan Racing	20
2	(Italy) BRC Racing Team	20
4	(Belgium) Comtoyou Racing	12
5	(France) M Racing-YMR	7
5	(France) Sébastien Loeb Racing	7
7	(Hungary) Zengő Motorsport	5
7	(Luxembourg) W Racing Team	5
9	(Italy) Team Mulsanne	3
9	(Germany) Engstler Motorsport	3
11	(Belgium) DG Sport Compétition	2
12	(Hong Kong) KCMG	1
12	(Spain) Campos Racing	1
12	(Sweden) PWR Racing	1

Cars
	Car	Total
1	Honda Civic Type R TCR (FK8)	22
2	Hyundai i30 N TCR	21
3	Lynk & Co 03 TCR	20
4	Audi RS 3 LMS TCR	17
5	Hyundai Elantra N TCR	9
6	Volkswagen Golf GTI TCR	7
7	Cupra León Competición TCR	5
8	Alfa Romeo Giulietta TCR	3
9	Peugeot 308 TCR	2
9	Cupra León TCR	2

== See also ==
- TCR Model of the Year
- TCR World Tour
- World Touring Car Championship
- TCR International Series
- List of World Touring Car Cup drivers
