= Otakar Krámský =

Czech hillclimbing racing car driver

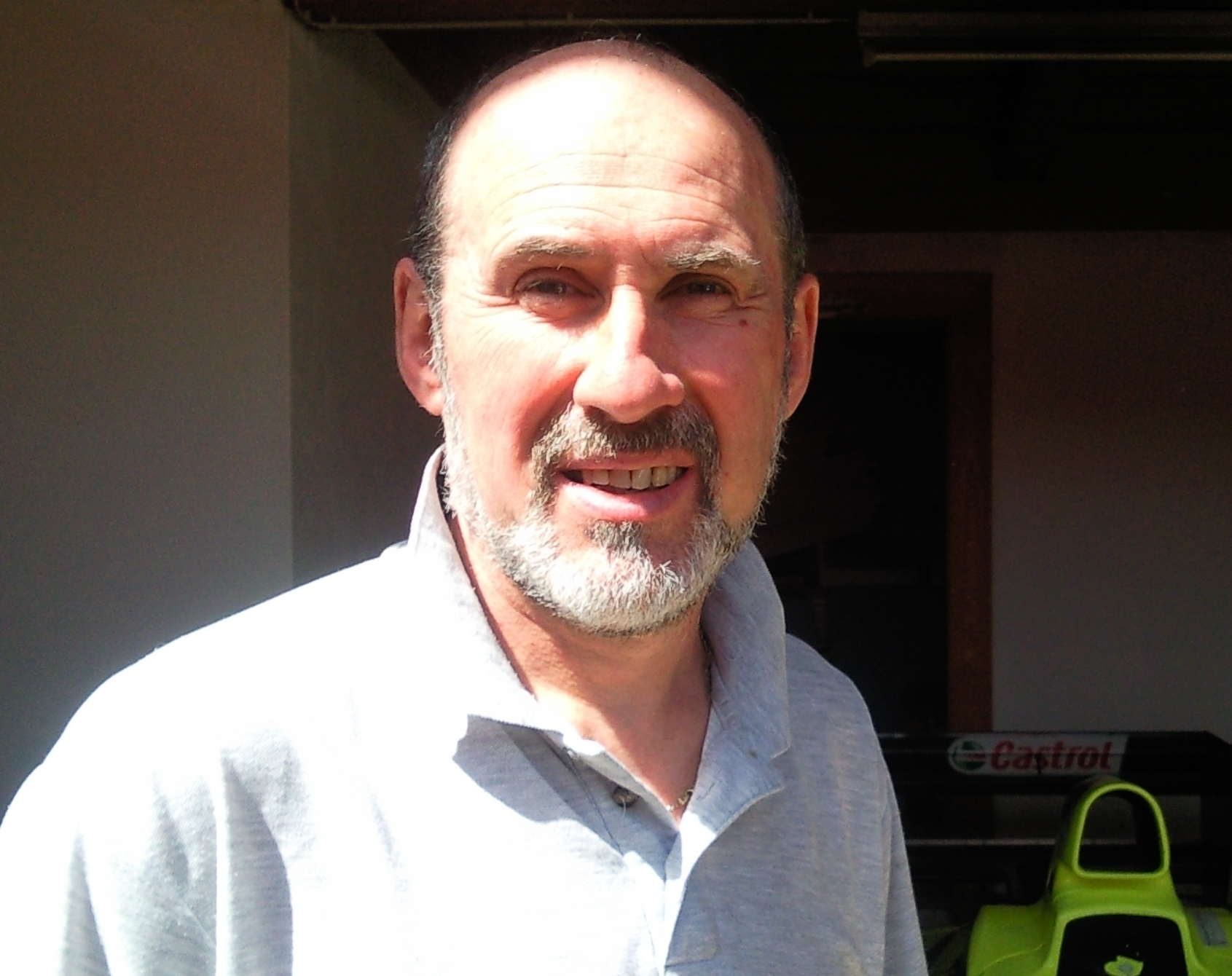
Otakar Krámský in 2013

Otakar Krámský (1 July 1959 Jilemnice, – 25 April 2015) was a Czech hillclimbing racing car driver. He began his career during the early 1970s. He won the European Hill Climb Championship on three occasions: 1995, 1997 and 1998.

Krámský died after his race car crashed during a race in Styria, Austria, aged 55.
