= 2020 Britcar Endurance Championship =

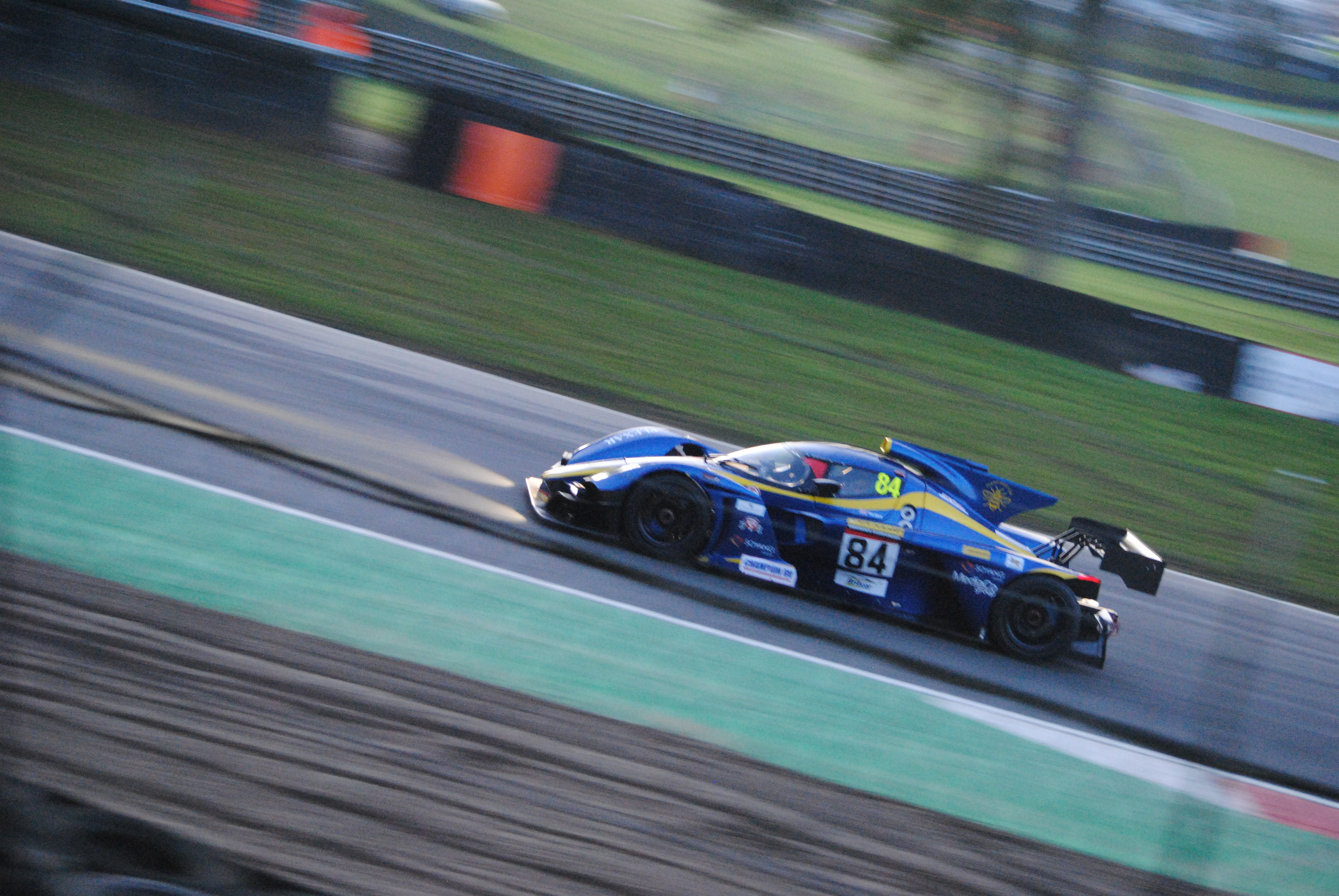
The Class 1-winning Praga R1. Danny Harrison, Jem Hepworth and VR Motorsport were the Overall and Class 1 champions.

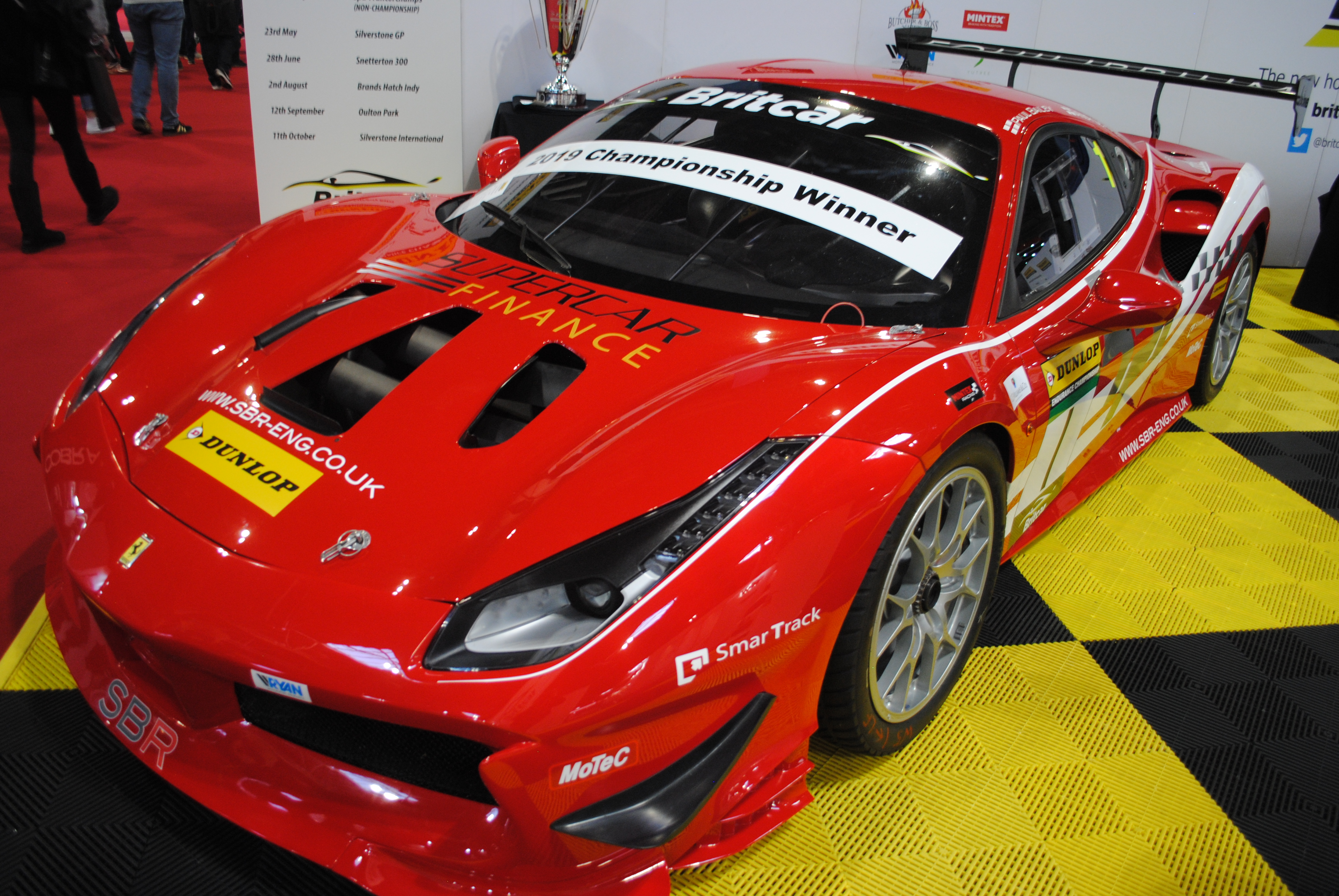
SB Race Engineering, Paul Bailey, Andy Schultz and Ross Wylie were Class 2 champions.

The 2020 Britcar Endurance Championship (known for sponsorship reasons as the 2020 Dunlop Endurance Championship) was a motor racing championship for GT cars, touring cars and sportscars held across England. The championship's field consists of varying types of cars from sportscar to GT and touring cars that compete in four classes, depending on horsepower, momentum, etc. It was the 19th season of a Britcar championship, the 9th run as the Britcar Endurance Championship, and the 5th run as the Dunlop Britcar Endurance Championship. It was the first Dunlop Endurance Championship run without Class 5 and below, after the formation of the Britcar Trophy Championship. The season began on 11 July at Croft Circuit and ended on 1 November at Snetterton Circuit. There was also a non-championship round at the Spa-Francorchamps in support of the 2019-20 FIA World Endurance Championship, where Endurance category competitors will participate in two races with the Trophy Category cars.

Danny Harrison and Jem Hepworth won the overall and Class 1 championships, reigning champions Paul Bailey and Andy Schultz, along with Ross Wylie won Class 2, Dave Benett and Marcus Fothergill won the Class 3 championship and Luke Davenport, Mark Davenport and Marcos Vivian won the Class 4 championship.

== Calendar ==
The opening rounds of the championship at Donington Park were scheduled to be held on 10 April 2020. The season includes a non-championship round at Spa-Francorchamps postponed due to the COVID-19 pandemic. The Spa-Francorchamps round was moved to 15 August.

Round	Circuit	Length	Date	Supporting
1	Croft Circuit, North Yorkshire (Grid combined with Britcar Trophy)	50 min	11–12 July	
1	Croft Circuit, North Yorkshire (Grid combined with Britcar Trophy)	50 min	11–12 July	
2	Brands Hatch Indy Circuit, Kent	60 min	1 August	Sports Prototype Cup
2	Brands Hatch Indy Circuit, Kent	60 min	1 August	Sports Prototype Cup
3	Oulton Park, Cheshire	60 min	12 September	
4	Silverstone International, Northamptonshire	60 min	10 October	
4	Silverstone International, Northamptonshire	60 min	10 October	
5	Snetterton Motor Racing Circuit (300), Norfolk	60 min	1 November	
5	Snetterton Motor Racing Circuit (300), Norfolk	60 min	1 November	
Non-championship round
NC	Spa-Francorchamps, Stavelot, Belgium	60 min	14 August	2019–20 FIA World Endurance Championship; Sports Prototype Cup
NC	Spa-Francorchamps, Stavelot, Belgium	60 min	14 August	2019–20 FIA World Endurance Championship; Sports Prototype Cup
Cancelled due to the 2019-20 coronavirus pandemic
	Donington National, Leicestershire	60 min	10 April	
	Donington National, Leicestershire	60 min	10 April	
	Silverstone GP, Northamptonshire	60 min	4–6 September	2020–21 FIA World Endurance Championship
	Silverstone GP, Northamptonshire	60 min	4–6 September	2020–21 FIA World Endurance Championship

== Teams and drivers ==
Cars are assigned classed based on speed, horsepower, momentum, equipment fitted to the car and the car's model;
Class 1: GT3, prototype cars
Class 2: GT4, cup (one-make series) cars
Class 3: Cup (one-make series) cars
Class 4: GT4, cup and TCR cars

Team	Car	No.	Drivers	Rounds
Class 1
DTB Motorsport	Aston Martin V12 Vantage GT3	007	(United Kingdom) Graham Davidson	NC
DTB Motorsport	Aston Martin V12 Vantage GT3	007	(United Kingdom) Graeme Mundy	NC
MacG Racing	Taranis	3	(United Kingdom) Jonny MacGregor	All
MacG Racing	Taranis	3	(United Kingdom) Ben Sharich	1–4
Venture Engineering	Aston Martin Vulcan AMR Pro	6	(Latvia) Gleb Stepanovs	NC
Venture Engineering	Aston Martin Vulcan AMR Pro	6	(United Kingdom) Steve Tomkins	NC
VR Motorsport (Note: Cars no. 84 and 99 entered as VR Motorsport and car no. 85 entered as VR Motorsport with Fox Transport); VR Motorsport with Fox Transport	Praga R1T Evo	84	(United Kingdom) Jack Fabby	1–2, 4–5
VR Motorsport; VR Motorsport with Fox Transport	Praga R1T Evo	84	(United Kingdom) Garry Townsend	1–2, 4–5
VR Motorsport; VR Motorsport with Fox Transport	Praga R1T Evo	85	(United Kingdom) Danny Harrison	All
VR Motorsport; VR Motorsport with Fox Transport	Praga R1T Evo	85	(United Kingdom) Jem Hepworth	2–5
VR Motorsport; VR Motorsport with Fox Transport	Praga R1T Evo	99	(United Kingdom) Jack Fabby	3
VR Motorsport; VR Motorsport with Fox Transport	Praga R1T Evo	99	(United Kingdom) Garry Townsend	3
Class 2
SB Race Engineering	Ferrari 488 Challenge	1	(United Kingdom) Paul Bailey	All
SB Race Engineering	Ferrari 488 Challenge	1	(United Kingdom) Ross Wylie	1, 4–5
SB Race Engineering	Ferrari 488 Challenge	1	(United Kingdom) Andy Schultz	2–3
Moss Motorsport	BMW 1M E82	18	(United Kingdom) Mike Moss	2, 4–5
Moss Motorsport	BMW 1M E82	18	(United Kingdom) Charles Lamb	2
Moss Motorsport	BMW 1M E82	18	(United Kingdom) Andy Schultz	4–5
RAW Motorsport	Radical RXC GT3	21	(United Kingdom) Steve Burgess	All
RAW Motorsport	Radical RXC GT3	21	(United Kingdom) Ben Dimmack	All
VR / Stand 2 Motorsport	Praga R1S	86	(United Kingdom) Martyn Compton	1–3, 5
VR / Stand 2 Motorsport	Praga R1S	86	(United Kingdom) Warren McKinlay	1–3, 5
Class 3
Superformance	Ferrari 458 Challenge	26	(United Kingdom) Colin Sowter	2
SG Racing	Porsche 997 Cup	32	(United Kingdom) Mark Cunningham	2, 4
SG Racing	Porsche 997 Cup	32	(United Kingdom) Peter Cunningham	2, 4
Bespoke Cars Racing	Porsche 991 GT3 Cup	69	(New Zealand) Dave Benett	All
Bespoke Cars Racing	Porsche 991 GT3 Cup	69	(United Kingdom) Marcus Fothergill	All
FNS	Ginetta G55 GT4	212	(United Kingdom) Chris Hart	1
FNS	Ginetta G55 GT4	212	(United Kingdom) Steve Walton	1
Class 3 Invitation
Team HARD.	Porsche 991 GT3 Cup	34	(United Kingdom) Eric Boulton	2, 5
Team HARD.	Porsche 991 GT3 Cup	34	(United Kingdom) Nick Scott-Dickeson	2
Team HARD.	Porsche 991 GT3 Cup	34	(United Kingdom) Jamie Martin	5
Porscheshop	Porsche 911 RSR	34	(United Kingdom) Ian Heward	4
Porscheshop	Porsche 911 RSR	34	(United Kingdom) Darelle Wilson	4
Valluga Racing	Porsche 991 GT3 Cup	911	(United Kingdom) Adam Hatfield	2
Valluga Racing	Porsche 991 GT3 Cup	911	(United Kingdom) Benji Hetherington	2
Class 4
County Classics	Porsche Cayman GT4 Clubsport MR	9	(United Kingdom) Peter Erceg	2–5
Motus One Racing	Ginetta G55 GT4	11	(United Kingdom) Will Powell	1–2, 4
Motus One Racing	Ginetta G55 GT4	11	(United Kingdom) David Scaramanga	1–2, 4
DigiPlat Racing	BMW M3 GTR	23	(United Kingdom) Nathan Wells	1–2
DigiPlat Racing	BMW M3 GTR	23	(United Kingdom) Ollie Hancock	2
CRH Racing	BMW M3 E46	35	(United Kingdom) Tom Bradshaw	2–4
CRH Racing	BMW M3 E46	35	(United Kingdom) Jonathan Evans	2–4
Reflex Racing	Ligier JS2 R	58	(United Kingdom) Luke Davenport	2–5
Reflex Racing	Ligier JS2 R	58	(United Kingdom) Marcus Vivian	2–4
Reflex Racing	Ligier JS2 R	58	(United Kingdom) Mark Davenport	5
EDF Motorsports	CUPRA León TCR	60	(United Kingdom) Martin Byford	1–2, 4–5
EDF Motorsports	CUPRA León TCR	60	(United Kingdom) Ashley Woodman	1–2, 4–5
Team BRIT	Aston Martin Vantage GT4	68	(United Kingdom) Bobby Trundley	2–5
Team BRIT	Aston Martin Vantage GT4	68	(United Kingdom) Aaron Morgan	2–4
Team BRIT	Aston Martin Vantage GT4	68	(United Kingdom) Charles Graham	5
Amspeed	BMW M3 E46	73	(United Kingdom) Jack Layton	3–4
Amspeed	BMW M3 E46	73	(United Kingdom) Matthew Sanders	3–4
Amspeed	BMW M3 E36	75	(United Kingdom) Chris Boardman	3
Amspeed	BMW M3 E36	75	(United Kingdom) Adam Howarth	3
Amspeed	BMW M3 E90	79	(United Kingdom) Dominic Malone	3
Maximum Motorsport	Volkswagen Golf GTI TCR	78	(United Kingdom) Tim Docker	2–4
Newbarn Racing	Jaguar F-Type S	88	(United Kingdom) Adam Thompson	2, 4–5
Newbarn Racing	Jaguar F-Type S	88	(United Kingdom) Callum Thompson	2, 4–5
Paul Sheard Motorsport	SEAT León TCR	98	(United Kingdom) Jonathan Beeson	5
Paul Sheard Motorsport	SEAT León TCR	98	(United Kingdom) George Heley	5
Morton & Millar	CUPRA León TCR	126	(United Kingdom) William Casswell	2
Morton & Millar	CUPRA León TCR	126	(United Kingdom) Marc Kemp	2
CJJ Motorsport with Valluga Racing	Porsche 718 Cayman GT4 Clubsport1–3, 5 Porsche Cayman GT4 Clubsport MR 4	718	(Republic of Ireland) Nicole Draught	All
CJJ Motorsport with Valluga Racing	Porsche 718 Cayman GT4 Clubsport1–3, 5 Porsche Cayman GT4 Clubsport MR 4	718	(Republic of Ireland) Sean Doyle	1–3, 5
CJJ Motorsport with Valluga Racing	Porsche 718 Cayman GT4 Clubsport1–3, 5 Porsche Cayman GT4 Clubsport MR 4	718	(United Kingdom) Lorcan Hanafin	4
Class 4 Invitation
Valluga Racing	Porsche 718 Cayman GT4 Clubsport	6	(Germany) Lars Dahmann	5
Valluga Racing	Porsche 718 Cayman GT4 Clubsport	6	(United Kingdom) Charlie Hollings	5
Albutt Racing	Aston Martin Vantage GT4	38	(United Kingdom) Dale Albutt	4
Albutt Racing	Aston Martin Vantage GT4	38	(United Kingdom) Mark Albutt	4
Zest Racecar Engineering	SEAT León TCR	48	(United Kingdom) Mark Jones	4
Zest Racecar Engineering	SEAT León TCR	48	(United Kingdom) Robert Taylor	4
Moss Motorsport	BMW M3 E46	57	(United Kingdom) Mike Moss	3
In2 Racing	Porsche 718 Cayman GT4 Clubsport	99	(Estonia) Andrey Borodin	4
In2 Racing	Porsche 718 Cayman GT4 Clubsport	99	(United Kingdom) Ed Pead	4
Maximum Motorsport	CUPRA León TCR	101	(United Kingdom) Tom Hibbert	5
Maximum Motorsport	CUPRA León TCR	101	(United Kingdom) Bruce Winfield	5
Simpson Motorsport	Audi RS3 LMS TCR	138	(United Kingdom) Hugo Cook	4
Simpson Motorsport	Audi RS3 LMS TCR	138	(United Kingdom) Sacha Kakad	4

=== Entries that didn't participate ===
These entries were previously announced to compete in the 2020 season but couldn't due to the 2019-20 coronavirus pandemic.

Team	Car	No.	Drivers
Class 1
SB Race Engineering	Brabham BT62 Competition	28	(United Kingdom) Paul Bailey
SB Race Engineering	Brabham BT62 Competition	28	(United Kingdom) Ross Wylie
Class 2
RNR Performance	Ferrari 488 Challenge	61	(United Kingdom) Charlie Hollings
RNR Performance	Ferrari 488 Challenge	61	(United Kingdom) Wayne Marrs
Class 4
CTR Alfatune	CUPRA León TCR	44	(United Kingdom) Alex Day
CTR Alfatune	CUPRA León TCR	44	(United Kingdom) William Foster
Whitebridge Motorsport	Aston Martin Vantage GT4	72	(United Kingdom) Chris Murphy
Whitebridge Motorsport	Aston Martin Vantage GT4	72	(United Kingdom) Steve Birt
Whitebridge Motorsport	Aston Martin Vantage GT4	101	(Australia) Mal Sandford
EDF/Paul Calladine Motorsport	Ginetta G50 GT4	92	(United Kingdom) Paul Calladine
EDF/Paul Calladine Motorsport	Ginetta G50 GT4	92	(United Kingdom) Graham Roberts

== Results ==
Round		Circuit	Pole position	Fastest lap	Overall winner	Winning C1	Winning C2	Winning C3	Winning C4
1	R1	Croft Circuit	No. 85 VR Motorsport	No. 85 VR Motorsport	No. 21 RAW Motorsport	No. 3 MacG Racing	No. 21 RAW Motorsport	No. 212 FNS	No. 60 EDF Motorsports
1	R1	Croft Circuit	(United Kingdom) Danny Harrison	(United Kingdom) Danny Harrison	(United Kingdom) Steve Burgess (United Kingdom) Ben Dimmack	(United Kingdom) Jonny MacGregor (United Kingdom) Ben Sharich	(United Kingdom) Steve Burgess (United Kingdom) Ben Dimmack	(United Kingdom) Chris Hart (United Kingdom) Steve Walton	(United Kingdom) Martin Byford (United Kingdom) Ashley Woodman
1	R2	Croft Circuit		No. 85 VR Motorsport	No. 85 VR Motorsport	No. 85 VR Motorsport	No. 1 SB Race Engineering	No. 212 FNS	No. 718 CJJ Motorsport with Valluga Racing
1	R2	Croft Circuit		(United Kingdom) Danny Harrison	(United Kingdom) Danny Harrison	(United Kingdom) Danny Harrison	(United Kingdom) Paul Bailey (United Kingdom) Ross Wylie	(United Kingdom) Chris Hart (United Kingdom) Steve Walton	(Republic of Ireland) Sean Doyle (Republic of Ireland) Nicole Draught
2	R3	Brands Hatch Indy	No. 85 VR Motorsport	No. 85 VR Motorsport	No. 85 VR Motorsport	No. 85 VR Motorsport	No. 86 / Stand 2 VR Motorsport	No. 911 Valluga Racing	No. 35 CRH Racing
2	R3	Brands Hatch Indy	(United Kingdom) Danny Harrison (United Kingdom) Jem Hepworth	(United Kingdom) Danny Harrison (United Kingdom) Jem Hepworth	(United Kingdom) Danny Harrison (United Kingdom) Jem Hepworth	(United Kingdom) Danny Harrison (United Kingdom) Jem Hepworth	(United Kingdom) Martyn Compton (United Kingdom) Warren McKinlay	(United Kingdom) Adam Hatfield (United Kingdom) Benji Hetherington	(United Kingdom) Tom Bradshaw (United Kingdom) Jonathan Evans
2	R4	Brands Hatch Indy		No. 85 VR Motorsport	No. 85 VR Motorsport	No. 85 VR Motorsport	No. 1 SB Race Engineering	No. 26 Superformance	No. 23 Digiplat Racing
2	R4	Brands Hatch Indy		(United Kingdom) Danny Harrison (United Kingdom) Jem Hepworth	(United Kingdom) Danny Harrison (United Kingdom) Jem Hepworth	(United Kingdom) Danny Harrison (United Kingdom) Jem Hepworth	(United Kingdom) Paul Bailey (United Kingdom) Andy Schultz	(United Kingdom) Colin Sowter	(United Kingdom) Ollie Hancock (United Kingdom) Nathan Wells
3	R5	Oulton Park	No. 85 VR Motorsport	No. 99 VR Motorsport	No. 99 VR Motorsport	No. 99 VR Motorsport	No. 21 RAW Motorsport	No. 69 Bespoke Cars Racing	No. 35 CRH Racing
3	R5	Oulton Park	(United Kingdom) Danny Harrison (United Kingdom) Jem Hepworth	(United Kingdom) Jack Fabby (United Kingdom) Garry Townsend	(United Kingdom) Jack Fabby (United Kingdom) Garry Townsend	(United Kingdom) Jack Fabby (United Kingdom) Garry Townsend	(United Kingdom) Steve Burgess (United Kingdom) Ben Dimmack	(New Zealand) Dave Benett (United Kingdom) Marcus Fothergill	(United Kingdom) Tom Bradshaw (United Kingdom) Jonathan Evans
4	R6	Silverstone International	No. 85 VR Motorsport	No. 85 VR Motorsport	No. 85 VR Motorsport	No. 85 VR Motorsport	No. 21 RAW Motorsport	No. 69 Bespoke Cars Racing	No. 60 EDF Motorsports
4	R6	Silverstone International	(United Kingdom) Danny Harrison (United Kingdom) Jem Hepworth	(United Kingdom) Danny Harrison (United Kingdom) Jem Hepworth	(United Kingdom) Danny Harrison (United Kingdom) Jem Hepworth	(United Kingdom) Danny Harrison (United Kingdom) Jem Hepworth	(United Kingdom) Steve Burgess (United Kingdom) Ben Dimmack	(New Zealand) Dave Benett (United Kingdom) Marcus Fothergill	(United Kingdom) Martin Byford (United Kingdom) Ashley Woodman
4	R7	Silverstone International		No. 85 VR Motorsport	No. 21 RAW Motorsport	No. 84 VR Motorsport	No. 21 RAW Motorsport	No. 32 SG Racing	No. 58 Reflex Racing
4	R7	Silverstone International		(United Kingdom) Danny Harrison (United Kingdom) Jem Hepworth	(United Kingdom) Steve Burgess (United Kingdom) Ben Dimmack	(United Kingdom) Jack Fabby (United Kingdom) Garry Townsend	(United Kingdom) Steve Burgess (United Kingdom) Ben Dimmack	(United Kingdom) Mark Cunningham (United Kingdom) Peter Cunningham	(United Kingdom) Luke Davenport (United Kingdom) Marcus Vivian
5	R8	Snetterton 300	No. 84 VR Motorsport	No. 84 VR Motorsport	No. 84 VR Motorsport	No. 84 VR Motorsport	No. 1 SB Race Engineering	No. 69 Bespoke Cars Racing	No. 718 CJJ Motorsport with Valluga Racing
5	R8	Snetterton 300	(United Kingdom) Jack Fabby (United Kingdom) Garry Townsend	(United Kingdom) Jack Fabby (United Kingdom) Garry Townsend	(United Kingdom) Jack Fabby (United Kingdom) Garry Townsend	(United Kingdom) Jack Fabby (United Kingdom) Garry Townsend	(United Kingdom) Paul Bailey (United Kingdom) Ross Wylie	(New Zealand) Dave Benett (United Kingdom) Marcus Fothergill	(Republic of Ireland) Sean Doyle (Republic of Ireland) Nicole Draught
5	R9	Snetterton 300		No. 1 SB Race Engineering	No. 84 VR Motorsport	No. 84 VR Motorsport	No. 1 SB Race Engineering	No. 34 Team HARD.	No. 6 Valluga Racing
5	R9	Snetterton 300		(United Kingdom) Paul Bailey (United Kingdom) Ross Wylie	(United Kingdom) Jack Fabby (United Kingdom) Garry Townsend	(United Kingdom) Jack Fabby (United Kingdom) Garry Townsend	(United Kingdom) Paul Bailey (United Kingdom) Ross Wylie	(United Kingdom) Eric Boulton (United Kingdom) Jamie Martin	(Germany) Lars Dahmann (United Kingdom) Charlie Hollings
Non-championship round
NC	R1	Spa-Francorchamps	No. 007 DTB Motorsport	No. 007 DTB Motorsport	No. 007 DTB Motorsport	No. 007 DTB Motorsport	No entries	No entries	No entries
NC	R1	Spa-Francorchamps	(United Kingdom) Graham Davidson (United Kingdom) Graeme Mundy	(United Kingdom) Graham Davidson (United Kingdom) Graeme Mundy	(United Kingdom) Graham Davidson (United Kingdom) Graeme Mundy	(United Kingdom) Graham Davidson (United Kingdom) Graeme Mundy	No entries	No entries	No entries
NC	R2	Spa-Francorchamps		No. 007 DTB Motorsport	No. 6 Venture Engineering	No. 6 Venture Engineering	No entries	No entries	No entries
NC	R2	Spa-Francorchamps		(United Kingdom) Graham Davidson (United Kingdom) Graeme Mundy	(Latvia) Gleb Stepanovs (United Kingdom) Steve Tomkins	(Latvia) Gleb Stepanovs (United Kingdom) Steve Tomkins	No entries	No entries	No entries

=== Overall championship standings ===
Points are awarded as follows in all classes

System	1st	2nd	3rd	4th	5th	6th	7th	8th	9th	10th	11th	12th	13th	14th	15th	PP	FL
+2	30	27	25	20	19	18	17	16	15	14	13	12	11	10	9	1	1

System	1st	2nd	PP	FL
-2	20	17	1	1

Pos.	Drivers	No.	Class	CRO		BRH		OUL	SIL		SNE		Pts
1	(United Kingdom) Danny Harrison	85	1	**8**	1	**1**	1	**Ret**	**1**	18†	1	2	213
1	(United Kingdom) Jem Hepworth	85	1			**1**	1	**Ret**	**1**	18†	1	2	213
2	(United Kingdom) Paul Bailey	1	2	2	3	21	3	3	3	3	4	3	208
2	(United Kingdom) Ross Wylie	1	2	2	3				3	3	4	3	208
2	(United Kingdom) Andy Schultz	1	2			21	3	3					208
3	(United Kingdom) Jack Fabby (United Kingdom) Garry Townsend	84	1	17	2	2	2		5	2	**3**	1	200
3	(United Kingdom) Jack Fabby (United Kingdom) Garry Townsend	99	1					1					200
4	(United Kingdom) Steve Burgess (United Kingdom) Ben Dimmack	21	2	1	17†	Ret	DNS	2	2	1	5	4	193.5
5	(United Kingdom) Luke Davenport	58	4			10	7	6	10	5	10	10	188
5	(United Kingdom) Marcus Vivian	58	4			10	7	6	10	5			188
5	(United Kingdom) Mark Davenport	58	4								10	10	188
6	(Republic of Ireland) Nicole Draught	718	4	5	5	15	14	7	16	10	6	8	181
6	(Republic of Ireland) Sean Doyle	718	4	5	5	15	14	7			6	8	181
6	(United Kingdom) Lorcan Hanafin	718	4						16	10			181
7	(United Kingdom) Martin Byford (United Kingdom) Ashley Woodman	60	4	3	7	11	11		7	6	14	15	174
8	(United Kingdom) Jonny MacGregor	3	1	6	4	6	5	NC	6	21†	2	Ret	170.5
8	(United Kingdom) Ben Sharich	3	1	6	4	6	5	NC	6	21†			170.5
9	(United Kingdom) Martyn Compton (United Kingdom) Warren McKinlay	86	2	4	19†	4	6	4			7	6	169.5
10	(United Kingdom) Bobby Trundley	68	4			12	8	10	11	8	12	14	148
10	(United Kingdom) Aaron Morgan	68	4			12	8	10	11	8			148
10	(United Kingdom) Charles Graham	68	4								12	14	148
11	(New Zealand) Dave Benett (United Kingdom) Marcus Fothergill	69	3	Ret	8	19	Ret	8	8	13	13	11	130
12	(United Kingdom) Peter Erceg	9	4			16	17	13	12	17	11	13	126
13	(United Kingdom) Tom Bradshaw (United Kingdom) Jonathan Evans	58	4			7	9	5	14	9			123
14	(United Kingdom) David Scaramanga (United Kingdom) Will Powell	11	4	10	Ret	18	16		9	11			100
15	(United Kingdom) Mark Cunningham (United Kingdom) Peter Cunningham	32	3			8	12		22†	4			91.5
16	(United Kingdom) Tim Docker	78	4			13	13	11	23†	12			78
17	(United Kingdom) Nathan Wells	23	4	Ret	Ret	9	4						59
17	(United Kingdom) Ollie Hancock	23	4			9	4						59
18	(United Kingdom) Colin Sowter	26	3			14	10						57
19	(United Kingdom) Mike Moss	18	2			5	Ret		4	Ret			52
19	(United Kingdom) Charles Lamb	18	2			5	Ret						52
19	(United Kingdom) Andy Schultz	18	2						4	Ret			52
20	(United Kingdom) Adam Thompson (United Kingdom) Callum Thompson	88	4			NC	18	Ret	20	DNS	Ret	16	45
21	(United Kingdom) Chris Hart (United Kingdom) Steve Walton	212	3	7	6								42
22	(United Kingdom) Jack Layton (United Kingdom) Matthew Sanders	73	4					14	13	19†			40.5
23	(United Kingdom) William Casswell (United Kingdom) Marc Kemp	126	4			20	15						30
24	(United Kingdom) Jonathan Beeson (United Kingdom) George Heler	98	4								Ret	12	25
25	(United Kingdom) Dominic Malone	79	4					9					20
26	(United Kingdom) Chris Boardman (United Kingdom) Adam Howarth	75	4					12					17
drivers ineligible for points
–	(United Kingdom) Adam Hatfield (United Kingdom) Benji Hetherington	911	3Inv			3	DSQ						0
–	(Germany) Lars Dahmann (United Kingdom) Charlie Hollings	6	4Inv								8	5	0
–	(United Kingdom) Hugo Cook (United Kingdom) Sacha Kakad	138	4Inv						15	7			0
–	(United Kingdom) Eric Boulton	34	3Inv			17	19				15	7	0
–	(United Kingdom) Nick Scott-Dickeson	34	3Inv			17	19						0
–	(United Kingdom) Jamie Martin	34	3Inv								15	7	0
–	(United Kingdom) Tom Hibbert (United Kingdom) Bruce Winfield	101	4Inv								9	9	0
–	(Estonia) Andrey Borodin (United Kingdom) Ed Pead	99	4Inv						18	14			0
–	(United Kingdom) Mike Moss	57	4Inv					15					0
–	(United Kingdom) Mark Jones (United Kingdom) Robert Taylor	48	4Inv						17	15			0
–	(United Kingdom) Dale Albutt (United Kingdom) Mark Albutt	38	4Inv						19	16			0
–	(United Kingdom) Ian Heward (United Kingdom) Darelle Wilson	34	3Inv						21	20†			0
Pos.	Drivers	No.	Class	CRO		BRH		OUL	SIL		SNE		Pts

Key
Colour	Result
Gold	Winner
Silver	Second place
Bronze	Third place
Green	Other points position
Blue	Other classified position
Blue	Not classified, finished (NC)
Purple	Not classified, retired (Ret)
Red	Did not qualify (DNQ)
Red	Did not pre-qualify (DNPQ)
Black	Disqualified (DSQ)
White	Did not start (DNS)
White	Race cancelled (C)
Blank	Did not practice (DNP)
Blank	Excluded (EX)
Blank	Did not arrive (DNA)
Blank	Withdrawn (WD)
Blank	Did not enter (cell empty)
Text formatting	Meaning
**Bold**	Pole position
Italics	Fastest lap

† – Drivers did not finish the race, but were classified as they completed over 60% of the race distance and were awarded half points.

=== Class championship standings ===
Points are awarded as follows in all classes

System	1st	2nd	3rd	4th	5th	6th	7th	8th	9th	10th	11th	12th	13th	14th	15th	PP	FL
+2	30	27	25	20	19	18	17	16	15	14	13	12	11	10	9	1	1

System	1st	2nd	PP	FL
-2	20	17	1	1

Pos.	Drivers	No.	CRO		BRH		OUL	SIL		SNE		Pts
Class 1
1	(United Kingdom) Danny Harrison	85	**8**	1	**1**	1	**Ret**	**1**	18†	1	2	213
1	(United Kingdom) Jem Hepworth	85			**1**	1	**Ret**	**1**	18†	1	2	213
2	(United Kingdom) Jack Fabby (United Kingdom) Garry Townsend	84	17	2	2	2		5	2	**3**	1	200
2	(United Kingdom) Jack Fabby (United Kingdom) Garry Townsend	99					1					200
3	(United Kingdom) Jonny MacGregor	3	6	4	6	5	NC	6	21†	2	Ret	170.5
3	(United Kingdom) Ben Sharich	3	6	4	6	5	NC	6	21†			170.5
Class 2
1	(United Kingdom) Paul Bailey	1	2	3	21	3	**3**	3	3	**4**	3	208
1	(United Kingdom) Ross Wylie	1	2	3				3	3	**4**	3	208
1	(United Kingdom) Andy Schultz	1			21	3	**3**					208
2	(United Kingdom) Steve Burgess (United Kingdom) Ben Dimmack	21	**1**	17†	**Ret**	DNS	2	**2**	1	5	4	193.5
3	(United Kingdom) Martyn Compton (United Kingdom) Warren McKinlay	86	4	19†	4	6	4			7	6	169.5
4	(United Kingdom) Mike Moss	18			5	Ret		4	Ret			52
4	(United Kingdom) Charles Lamb	18			5	Ret						52
4	(United Kingdom) Andy Schultz	18						4	Ret			52
Class 3
1	(New Zealand) Dave Benett (United Kingdom) Marcus Fothergill	69	**Ret**	8	19	Ret	**8**	8	13	**13**	11	130
2	(United Kingdom) Mark Cunningham (United Kingdom) Peter Cunningham	32			**8**	12		**22**†	4			91.5
3	(United Kingdom) Colin Sowter	26			14	10						57
4	(United Kingdom) Chris Hart (United Kingdom) Steve Walton	212	7	6								42
drivers ineligible for points
–	(United Kingdom) Adam Hatfield (United Kingdom) Benji Hetherington	911			3	DSQ						0
–	(United Kingdom) Eric Boulton	34			17	19				15	7	0
–	(United Kingdom) Nick Scott-Dickeson	34			17	19						0
–	(United Kingdom) Jamie Martin	34								15	7	0
–	(United Kingdom) Ian Heward (United Kingdom) Darelle Wilson	34						21	20†			0
Class 4
1	(United Kingdom) Luke Davenport	58			10	7	6	10	5	10	10	188
1	(United Kingdom) Marcus Vivian	58			10	7	6	10	5			188
1	(United Kingdom) Mark Davenport	58								10	10	188
2	(Republic of Ireland) Nicole Draught	718	**5**	5	15	14	7	16	10	6	8	181
2	(Republic of Ireland) Sean Doyle	718	**5**	5	15	14	7			6	8	181
2	(United Kingdom) Lorcan Hanafin	718						16	10			181
3	(United Kingdom) Martin Byford (United Kingdom) Ashley Woodman	60	3	7	11	11		7	6	**14**	15	174
4	(United Kingdom) Bobby Trundley	68			12	8	10	11	8	12	14	148
4	(United Kingdom) Aaron Morgan	68			12	8	10	11	8			148
4	(United Kingdom) Charles Graham	68								12	14	148
5	(United Kingdom) Peter Erceg	9			16	17	13	12	17	11	13	126
6	(United Kingdom) Tom Bradshaw (United Kingdom) Jonathan Evans	58			**7**	9	**5**	**14**	9			123
7	(United Kingdom) David Scaramanga (United Kingdom) Will Powell	11	10	Ret	18	16		9	11			100
8	(United Kingdom) Tim Docker	78			13	13	11	23†	12			78
9	(United Kingdom) Nathan Wells	23	Ret	Ret	9	4						59
9	(United Kingdom) Ollie Hancock	23			9	4						59
10	(United Kingdom) Adam Thompson (United Kingdom) Callum Thompson	88			NC	18	Ret	20	DNS	Ret	16	45
11	(United Kingdom) Jack Layton (United Kingdom) Matthew Sanders	73					14	13	19†			40.5
12	(United Kingdom) William Casswell (United Kingdom) Marc Kemp	126			20	15						30
13	(United Kingdom) Jonathan Beeson (United Kingdom) George Heler	98								Ret	12	25
14	(United Kingdom) Dominic Malone	79					9					20
15	(United Kingdom) Chris Boardman (United Kingdom) Adam Howarth	75					12					17
drivers ineligible for points
–	(Germany) Lars Dahmann (United Kingdom) Charlie Hollings	6								8	5	0
–	(United Kingdom) Hugo Cook (United Kingdom) Sacha Kakad	138						15	7			0
–	(United Kingdom) Tom Hibbert (United Kingdom) Bruce Winfield	101								9	9	0
–	(Estonia) Andrey Borodin (United Kingdom) Ed Pead	99						18	14			0
–	(United Kingdom) Mike Moss	57					15					0
–	(United Kingdom) Mark Jones (United Kingdom) Robert Taylor	48						17	15			0
–	(United Kingdom) Dale Albutt (United Kingdom) Mark Albutt	38						19	16			0
Pos.	Drivers	No.	CRO		BRH		OUL	SIL		SNE		Pts

† – Drivers did not finish the race, but were classified as they completed over 60% of the race distance and were awarded half points.
