= Owen McAuley =

British racing driver (born 1973)

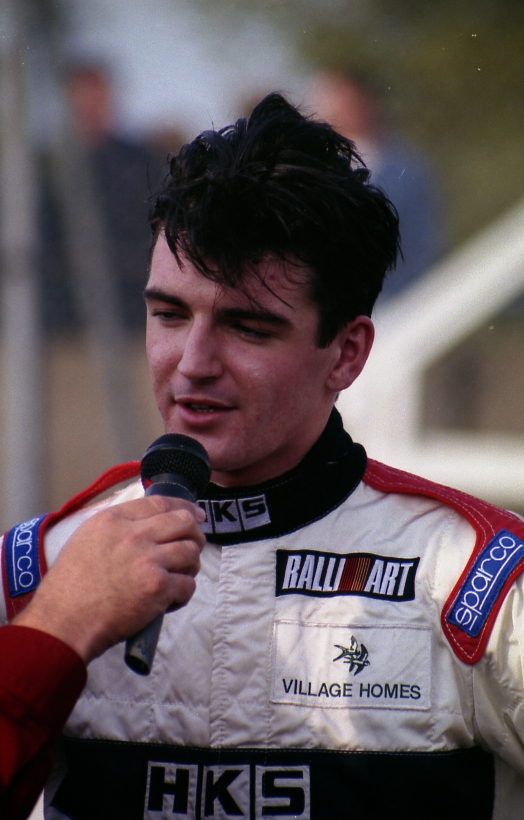
- Nationality: (United Kingdom) British
- Born: 5 October 1973 (age 53) Belfast, Northern Ireland, United Kingdom

British Touring Car Championship
- Years active: 1996
- Teams: Rouse Sport
- Starts: 15
- Wins: 0
- Poles: 0
- Fastest laps: 0
- Best finish: 18th in 1996

Owen McAuley (born 5 October 1973 in Belfast, Northern Ireland) is a British racing driver.

== Racing career ==
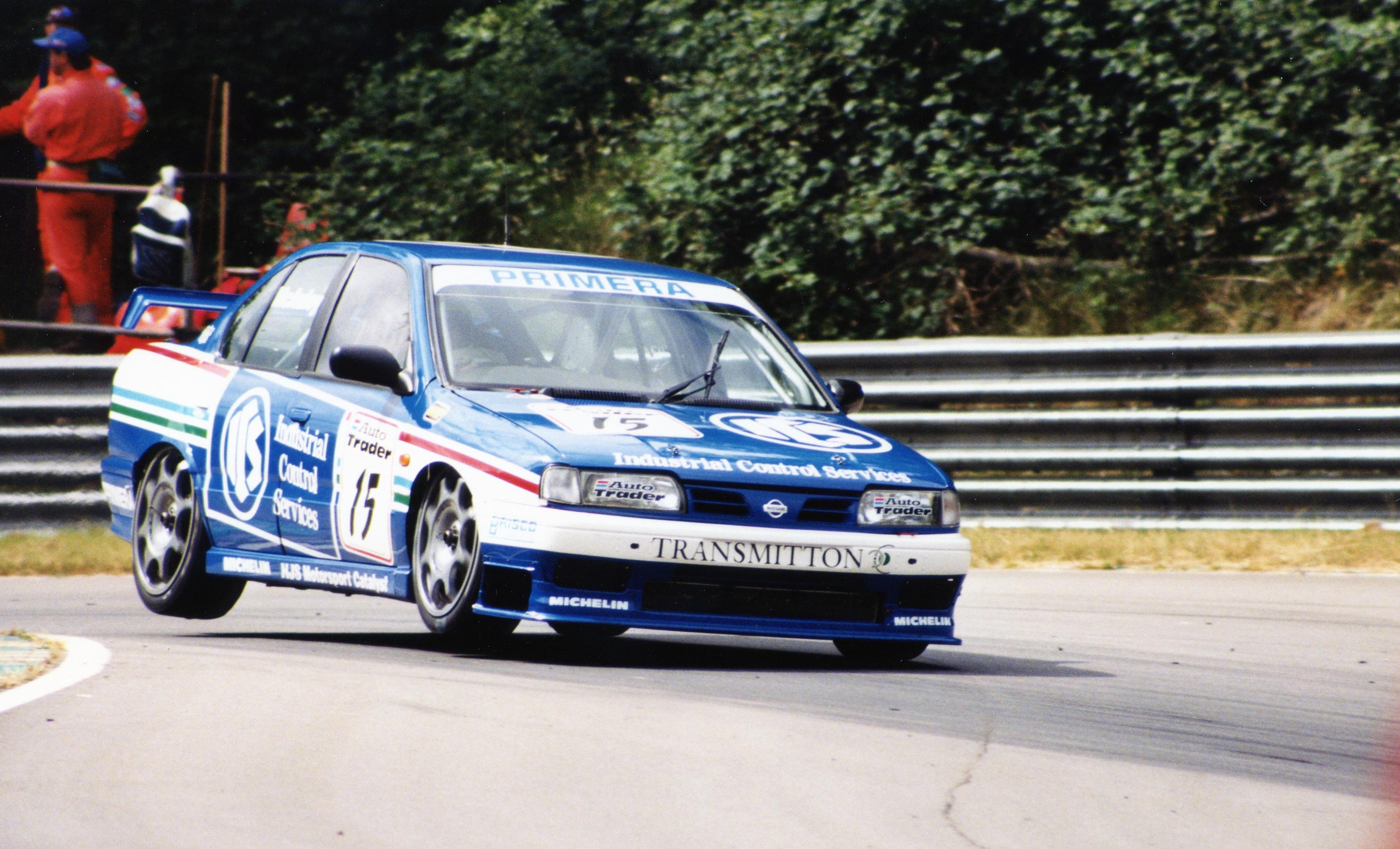
McAuley driving the Rouse Sport Nissan Primera at Brands Hatch during the 1996 British Touring Car Championship season.

McAuley started karting in his native Northern Ireland, becoming national champion three years running from 1988 to 1991.

After his successful karting career, McAuley progressed into single-seat racing cars.

In 1992, McAuley raced in the Northern Ireland Formula Ford Championship, finishing the season in fourth place. In 1993, he won the Formula Vauxhall Lotus Winter Series, This was followed in 1994 by winning the British Formula Vauxhall Lotus title, including four race wins. These prestigious British titles were won driving for Paul Stewart Racing.

Another title came in 1995, winning the International Formula 3 Cup for Silverstone-based Alan Docking Racing.

A year in the British Touring Car Championship in 1996 was followed by moving to America to compete in the Barber Dodge Pro Series where he raced on some famous circuits like Sebring in Florida and Road America in Ohio.

== Racing record ==
=== Complete British Touring Car Championship results ===
(key) (Races in bold indicate pole position - 1 point awarded all races) (Races in italics indicate fastest lap)

| Year | Team | Car | 1 | 2 | 3 | 4 | 5 | 6 | 7 | 8 | 9 | 10 | 11 | 12 | 13 | 14 | 15 | 16 | 17 | 18 | 19 | 20 | 21 | 22 | 23 | 24 | 25 | 26 | Pos | Pts |
|---|---|---|---|---|---|---|---|---|---|---|---|---|---|---|---|---|---|---|---|---|---|---|---|---|---|---|---|---|---|---|
| 1996 | Rouse Sport | Nissan Primera eGT | DON; 1; 14 | DON; 2; 12 | BRH; 1; 13 | BRH; 2 DNS | THR; 1; 9 | THR; 2; 11 | SIL; 1; 16 | SIL; 2 Ret | OUL; 1; 15 | OUL; 2; 10 | SNE; 1; 11 | SNE; 2 Ret | BRH; 1; 15 | BRH; 2 Ret | SIL; 1 Ret | SIL; 2 Ret | KNO; 1 | KNO; 2 | OUL; 1 | OUL; 2 | THR; 1 | THR; 2 | DON; 1 | DON; 2 | BRH; 1 | BRH; 2 | 18th | 3 |
