= Ian Heward =

British racing driver (1964–2022)

- Nationality: (United Kingdom) British
- Born: 3 July 1964 Leeds, West Yorkshire, England
- Died: 18 October 2022 (aged 58)

British Touring Car Championship
- Years active: 1996–1997
- Teams: ProMotor Sport
- Starts: 6
- Wins: 0
- Poles: 0
- Fastest laps: 0

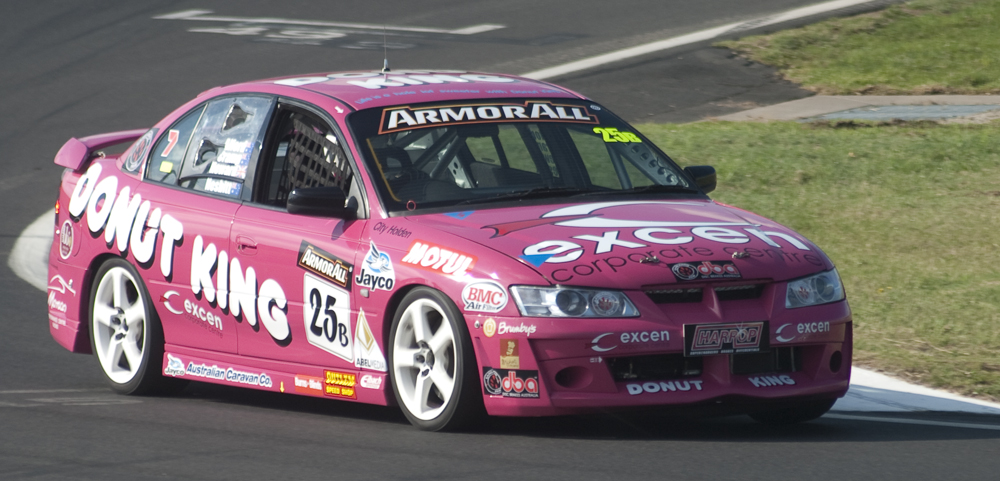
Heward at the 2010 Armor All Bathurst 12 Hour

Ian James Heward (3 July 1964 – 18 October 2022) was a British racing driver. He was best known as entering the prestigious British Touring Car Championship in the mid-nineties as an under-funded driver. He started racing as a rally driver in the early 80's and switched to circuit racing with three years in the British Porsche Carrera Cup from 1987 to 1989 in a 924 and 911s. In 1990, he drove in some races in the Formula Ford 1600 and Formula Renault Championships in 90/91. He returned to racing in a Porsche 944 S2 in 1994/5 with the British Production Car Group N series dominated by the Ford Cosworth Sierra 's. This was followed by races in some rounds of the VW Vento Challenge in 1995.

== BTCC ==
Heward first entered the British Touring Car Championship in 1996 where he campaigned a former David Leslie RML works 1993 Vauxhall Cavalier with his own low-budget Promotor-Sport Team. He started his season in the third round at Brands Hatch, but was well off the pace of his fellow Total Cup for Independents racers, failing to qualify due to steering issues. He returned for round 19 at Oulton Park, but did not qualify for a race until round 21 at Thruxton, finishing the first race, but retiring with gearbox failure in round 22. He would have more success on his second visit to Thruxton circuit that year finishing 12th overall in the now historic race that saw Alain Menu and Will Hoy's crash in the Williams, Renault Laguna at Campbell on the opening lap. The last two championship races of the year at Donington Park saw Heward on the podium twice, second & third in class and finishing the season's Total Cup in overall fifth place with 28 points. He returned to Donington Park in October that year for the International Tourist Trophy Race but had to retire due to engine failure.

Despite problems with the car, Heward returned with an updated Vauxhall Cavalier for eight more BTCC rounds in 1997 qualifying for rounds eleven and twelve at Donington Park, finishing second in class, in the second of these races, four laps down from race winner Alain Menu.

In 2010, Heward competed in the Bathurst 12 Hour race in the Donut King Holden Commodore HSV V8, and in the Britcar endurance championship series with Mike Millard in Mike's ProSport 3000 GT. Ian further raced in the 2011/12/13 Britcar series in the Gold Centre's 3400cc Nissan Class A LMP2 Rapier SR2. Heward held the Castle Combe circuit Outright lap record during 2011 with a lap time of 1:05.23secs, and took the outright race win at the Spa-Francorchamps round in Belgium in 2011, having only learnt the circuit that same morning in qualifying, due in part to mechanical issues in pre-race day testing.

In 2016, Heward returned to the Britcar Endurance Car Championship in a Porsche 911 RSR racing for the Porscheshop Team with TCR and GT Driver Darelle Wilson.

Heward continued in Britcar in 2018/19 & 2020, racing in the Porsche 911 RSR with protege Darelle Wilson for The Porscheshop Team, achieving second in class and sixth overall in the championship.

== Racing record ==
=== Complete British Touring Car Championship results ===
(key)

Year	Team	Car	1	2	3	4	5	6	7	8	9	10	11	12	13	14	15	16	17	18	19	20	21	22	23	24	25	26	Pos	Pts
1996	ProMotor Sport	Vauxhall Cavalier	DON; 1	DON; 2	BRH; 1 DNS	BRH; 2 DNS	THR; 1	THR; 2	SIL; 1	SIL; 2	OUL; 1	OUL; 2	SNE; 1	SNE; 2	BRH; 1	BRH; 2	SIL; 1	SIL; 2	KNO; 1	KNO; 2	OUL; 1 DNS	OUL; 2 DNS	THR; 1; 12	THR; 2 Ret	DON; 1; 18	DON; 2; 18	BRH; 1	BRH; 2	NC	0
1997	ProMotor Sport	Vauxhall Cavalier	DON; 1	DON; 2	SIL; 1	SIL; 2	THR; 1	THR; 2	BRH; 1	BRH; 2	OUL; 1	OUL; 2	DON; 1 Ret	DON; 2; 16	CRO; 1	CRO; 2	KNO; 1	KNO; 2	SNE; 1 DNQ	SNE; 2 DNQ	THR; 1 DNQ	THR; 2 DNQ	BRH; 1	BRH; 2	SIL; 1 DNQ	SIL; 2 DNQ			NC	0

=== Complete Britcar results ===
(key) (Races in bold indicate pole position in class – 1 point awarded just in first race; races in italics indicate fastest lap in class – 1 point awarded all races;-

Year	Team	Car	Class	1	2	3	4	5	6	7	8	9	DC	CP	Points
2016	Porscheshop	Porsche 911 RSR	2	SIL; 17	SNE; 11	DON; 10	THR	CRO	SIL	OUL	BRH		11th	2nd	60
2020	Porscheshop	Porsche 911 RSR	2Inv	CRO; 1	CRO; 2	BRH; 1	BRH; 2	OUL; 1	SIL; 1; 20	SIL; 2; 21	SNE; 1	SNE; 2	NC†	NC†	0

† Heward was ineligible for points as he was an invitation entry.
