= 2020 Britcar Trophy Championship =

The 2020 Dunlop Trophy Championship was a motor racing championship for production cars held across England. The Trophy championship was created specifically for production vehicles as a Britcar championship separate from the much faster GT and Touring Cars of the Endurance Championship. It is the 19th season of a Britcar championship and the 1st Britcar Trophy Championship season.

2020 was the inaugural season of the Britcar Trophy Championship. The season began on 11 July at Croft Circuit and ended on 1 November at Snetterton Circuit. All rounds took place on the same weekend as the Britcar Endurance Championship rounds. There was also a non-championship round at the Spa-Francorchamps in support of the 2019-20 FIA World Endurance Championship, where the Trophy category competitors participated in two races with the Endurance Category cars.

The championship included Class 5, 6 and 7 cars. The Michelin Clio Cup Series also joined the Britcar Trophy Championship grid for the inaugural season with the Clio cars having a separate class but still eligible to compete for the overall championship title.

2020 Class Champions and Overall Trophy Championship Places

Oliver Smith won the Class 6 championship and overall Trophy title with 191 points, Johnathan Barrett won the Class 7 championship and was second overall with 188 points and Charlie Campbell and Rob Smith won the Class 5 championship and were third overall with 177.5 points. The Clio class champions were Aaron and Steve Thompson with 137.5 points.

== Calendar ==
The planned opening round at Donington Park, to be held on 10 April 2020, was eventually cancelled due to the pandemic. The non-championship round at Spa-Francorchamps was postponed due to the COVID-19 pandemic. and moved to 15 August. The revised championship was contested over 9 races at 5 rounds, with best 7 results counting.

| Round | Circuit | Length | Date | Supporting |
|---|---|---|---|---|
| 1 | Croft Circuit, North Yorkshire (Grid combined with Britcar Endurance) | 50 min | 11–12 July | |
| 1 | Croft Circuit, North Yorkshire (Grid combined with Britcar Endurance) | 50 min | 11–12 July | |
| 2 | Brands Hatch Indy Circuit, Kent | 50 min | 1–2 August | Sports Prototype Cup |
| 2 | Brands Hatch Indy Circuit, Kent | 50 min | 1–2 August | Sports Prototype Cup |
| 3 | Oulton Park, Cheshire | 50 min | 12 September | |
| 4 | Silverstone International, Northamptonshire | 50 min | 11 October | |
| 4 | Silverstone International, Northamptonshire | 50 min | 11 October | |
| 5 | Snetterton Motor Racing Circuit (300), Norfolk | 50 min | 1 November | |
| 5 | Snetterton Motor Racing Circuit (300), Norfolk | 50 min | 1 November | |
Non-championship round
| | Spa-Francorchamps, Stavelot, Belgium | 60 min | 14 August | 2019–20 FIA World Endurance Championship; Sports Prototype Cup |
| | Spa-Francorchamps, Stavelot, Belgium | 60 min | 14 August | 2019–20 FIA World Endurance Championship; Sports Prototype Cup |
Cancelled due to the 2019-20 coronavirus pandemic
| | Donington National, Leicestershire | 50 min | 10 April | |
| | Donington National, Leicestershire | 50 min | 10 April | |

== Teams and drivers ==
| Team | Car | No. | Drivers | Rounds |
Class 5
| Charlie Campbell | Peugeot RCZ | 20 | (United Kingdom) Charlie Campbell | 2–5 |
| Charlie Campbell | Peugeot RCZ | 20 | (United Kingdom) Rob Smith | 2–5 |
| MacG Racing | Mazda RX-8 | 33 | (United Kingdom) Jonny MacGregor | 2–4 |
| MacG Racing | Mazda RX-8 | 33 | (United Kingdom) Josh Tomlinson | 2–4 |
| Amigo Motorsport | Porsche Boxster | 39 | (United Kingdom) Richard Bernard | 2–4 |
| Simon Green Motorsport | BMW M3 E46 | 40 | (United Kingdom) Jasver Sapra | 1 |
| JRW Motorsport | Volkswagen Golf | 47 | (United Kingdom) Rob Austin | 2 |
| JRW Motorsport | Volkswagen Golf | 47 | (United Kingdom) James Goodall | 2 |
| S2Smarts | Smart ForFour | 52 | (United Kingdom) Rob Baker | 1–2, 4–5 |
| S2Smarts | Smart ForFour | 52 | (United Kingdom) John Packer | 1–2, 4–5 |
| Derek McMahon Racing | Alfa Romeo 156 T | 57 | (Republic of Ireland) Barry McMahon | 1–4 |
| CRH Racing | Porsche Cayman | 77 | (United Kingdom) Robert Pugsley | 2–3 |
| Team IP/Antac | Porsche Boxster | 80 | (United Kingdom) Anthony Hutchins | All |
| SBD Motorsport | Ford Fiesta | 93 | (United Kingdom) Kester Cook | 3–4 |
Class 5 Invitation
| JW Bird Motorsport | Volkswagen Scirocco | 5 | (United Kingdom) Tony Prendergast | 5 |
| JW Bird Motorsport | Volkswagen Scirocco | 71 | (United Kingdom) Matthew Evans | 5 |
| JW Bird Motorsport | Volkswagen Scirocco | 96 | (United Kingdom) Nick Beaumont | 5 |
| JW Bird Motorsport | Volkswagen Scirocco | 96 | (United Kingdom) Marc Clynes | 5 |
| Amspeed | BMW M3 E36 | 75 | (United Kingdom) Chris Boardman | 4–5 |
| Amspeed | BMW M3 E36 | 75 | (United Kingdom) Adam Howarth | 4–5 |
| Ainge Racing | Honda Integra (fourth generation) | 85 | (United Kingdom) Nigel Ainge | 4–5 |
| Ainge Racing | Honda Integra (fourth generation) | 85 | (United Kingdom) Danny Casser | 4–5 |
| Maximum Motorsport | Ginetta G55 Supercup | 95 | (United Kingdom) Max Hunt | 5 |
| Maximum Motorsport | Ginetta G55 Supercup | 95 | (United Kingdom) Stewart Lines | 5 |
| Daz RKC Motorsport | Honda Civic Type R | 99 | (United Kingdom) Ricky Coomber | 5 |
Class 6
| Ramen Racing | Ginetta G40 | 2 | (United Kingdom) Peter Spano | 2, 4–5 |
| Ramen Racing | Ginetta G40 | 2 | (United Kingdom) Andrew Bentley | 2 |
| Ramen Racing | Ginetta G40 | 2 | (United Kingdom) Charlie Hollings | 4–5 |
| Quattro Motorsport UK | Ginetta G40 | 6 | (United Kingdom) Bill Forbes | 1, 4 |
| Quattro Motorsport UK | Ginetta G40 | 82 | (United Kingdom) Richard Evans | 1, 4 |
| Majestic Motorsport | Mazda MX5 Mk3 | 10 | (United Kingdom) Chris Clarke | 1, 4 |
| Majestic Motorsport | Mazda MX5 Mk3 | 10 | (United Kingdom) Mike Hart | 1 |
| Majestic Motorsport | Mazda MX5 Mk3 | 10 | (United Kingdom) Ben Thompson | 4 |
| County Classic | Porsche 996 | 15 | (United Kingdom) Richard Higgins | 3–5 |
| Vinna Sport | Ginetta G40 | 27 | (United Kingdom) Charlotte Birch | All |
| Vinna Sport | Ginetta G40 | 27 | (Brazil) Adriano Medeiros | All |
| JC Racing | BMW M3 E36 | 36 | (United Kingdom) Oliver Smith | All, NC |
| CRH Racing | Porsche Cayman | 77 | (United Kingdom) Robert Pugsley | 4 |
| Saxon Motorsport | SEAT León | 87 | (United Kingdom) Brad Kaylor | All |
| Saxon Motorsport | SEAT León | 87 | (United Kingdom) Rory Baptiste | 4 |
| Paul Sheard Motorsport | Mazda MX5 Mk3 | 98 | (United Kingdom) Chrissy Palmer | 1 |
Class 6 Invitation
| Rob Sanderson Motorsport | Lotus Elise | 68 | (United Kingdom) Toby Goodman | 4 |
| Rob Sanderson Motorsport | Lotus Elise | 68 | (United Kingdom) Colin Tester | 4 |
| Ainge Racing | Honda Integra (fourth generation) | 85 | (United Kingdom) Nigel Ainge | 3 |
| Ainge Racing | Honda Integra (fourth generation) | 85 | (United Kingdom) Danny Casser | 3 |
Class 7
| Pantera Motorsport with Saxon Motorsport | BMW 330 E46 | 7 | (United Kingdom) Johnathan Barrett | 2–5 |
| Saxon Motorsport | Volkswagen Golf Mk2 | 34 | (United Kingdom) Alistair Lindsay | 2–5 |
| Team BRIT | BMW 116 | 65 | (United Kingdom) Darren Cook | 2 |
| Team BRIT | BMW 116 | 65 | (United Kingdom) Charles Graham | 2 |
| Team BRIT | BMW 116 | 65 | (United Kingdom) James Birch | 4 |
| Team BRIT | BMW 116 | 65 | (United Kingdom) Christian Dart | 4 |
| Team BRIT | BMW 116 | 66 | (United Kingdom) Luke Pound | 2–5 |
| Team BRIT | BMW 116 | 66 | (United Kingdom) Darren Cook | 3 |
| Team BRIT | BMW 116 | 66 | (United Kingdom) Tom Dorman | 4–5 |
| Team BRIT | BMW 116 | 67 | (United Kingdom) Matty Street | 2–5 |
| Team BRIT | BMW 116 | 67 | (United Kingdom) Andrew Tucker | 2–5 |
| Derek McMahon Racing | Honda Civic Type R | 83 | (United Kingdom) Edward Cook | 2–5 |
| Derek McMahon Racing | Honda Civic Type R | 83 | (United Kingdom) Steve Cook | 2–5 |
| Paul Sheard Motorsport | Mazda MX5 Mk3 | 316 | (United Kingdom) Ivor Mairs | 3–5 |
Class 7 Invitation
| Reflex Racing | Ginetta G20 | 19 | (United Kingdom) Steve Griffiths | 4 |
| Reflex Racing | Ginetta G20 | 19 | (United Kingdom) Jamie Vynle-Meyers | 4 |
| MacG Racing | Toyota Celica | 37 | (United Kingdom) Kelly Brabbin | 5 |
| Team BRIT | BMW 118 | 69 | (United Kingdom) Abbie Eaton | 4 |
| Team BRIT | BMW 118 | 69 | (United Kingdom) Nerys Pearce | 4 |
| Team BRIT | BMW 116 | 69 | (United Kingdom) Aaron Morgan | 5 |
| Team BRIT | BMW 116 | 69 | (United Kingdom) Nerys Pearce | 5 |
Clios
| Westbourne Motors | Renault Clio Gen 3 | 13 | (United Kingdom) Darren Geeraerts | 2, 4 |
| Westbourne Motors | Renault Clio Gen 3 | 63 | (United Kingdom) Richard Colburn | 2, 4 |
| Westbourne Motors | Renault Clio Gen 3 | 63 | (United Kingdom) Peter Dorlin | 2 |
| Westbourne Motors | Renault Clio Gen 3 | 63 | (United Kingdom) David Beecroft | 4 |
| Westbourne Motors | Renault Clio Gen 4 | 41 | (United Kingdom) Aaron Thompson | 2–5 |
| Westbourne Motors | Renault Clio Gen 4 | 41 | (United Kingdom) Steve Thompson | 2–5 |
| Westbourne Motors | Renault Clio Gen 4 | 62 | (United Kingdom) James Colburn | 2, 4 |
| Westbourne Motors | Renault Clio Gen 4 | 64 | (United Kingdom) Ben Colburn | 2, 4 |
| Clio Invitation | Renault Clio Gen 4 | | | |
| Spires Motorsport | Renault Clio Gen 4 | 30 | (United Kingdom) Darren Geeraerts | 5 |
| Spires Motorsport | Renault Clio Gen 4 | 30 | (United Kingdom) Anton Spires | 5 |

=== Entries that didn't participate ===
These entries were previously announced to compete in the 2020 season but couldn't due to the 2019-20 coronavirus pandemic.

| Team | Car | No. | Drivers |
Class 5
| SVG Motorsport | BMW M3 E92 | 55 | (United Kingdom) Andrew Busby |
| SVG Motorsport | BMW M3 E92 | 55 | (United Kingdom) Andy Johnson |
| Jamie Sturges | SEAT León Eurocup | 99 | (United Kingdom) Jamie Sturges |
Class 6
| Derek McMahon Racing | Honda Civic Type R | 45 | (Republic of Ireland) Arthur McMahon |

== Results ==
| Round | | Circuit | Pole position | Fastest lap | Overall winner | Winning C5 | Winning C6 | Winning C7 | Winning Clio |
|---|---|---|---|---|---|---|---|---|---|
| 1 | R1 | Croft Circuit | No. 57 Derek McMahon Racing | No. 40 Simon Green Motorsport | No. 52 S2Smarts | No. 52 S2Smarts | No. 98 Paul Sheard Motorsport | No entries | No entries |
| 1 | R1 | Croft Circuit | (Republic of Ireland) Barry McMahon | (United Kingdom) Jasver Sapra | (United Kingdom) Rob Baker (United Kingdom) Jonathan Packer | (United Kingdom) Rob Baker (United Kingdom) Jonathan Packer | (United Kingdom) Chrissy Palmer | No entries | No entries |
| 1 | R2 | Croft Circuit | | No. 36 JC Racing | No. 36 JC Racing | No. 57 Derek McMahon Racing | No. 36 JC Racing | No entries | No entries |
| 1 | R2 | Croft Circuit | | (United Kingdom) Oliver Smith | (United Kingdom) Oliver Smith | (Republic of Ireland) Barry McMahon | (United Kingdom) Oliver Smith | No entries | No entries |
| 2 | R3 | Brands Hatch Indy | No. 57 Derek McMahon Racing | No. 57 Derek McMahon Racing | No. 57 Derek McMahon Racing | No. 57 Derek McMahon Racing | No. 36 JC Racing | No. 7 Pantera Motorsport with Saxon Motorsport | No. 62 Westbourne Motors |
| 2 | R3 | Brands Hatch Indy | (Republic of Ireland) Barry McMahon | (Republic of Ireland) Barry McMahon | (Republic of Ireland) Barry McMahon | (Republic of Ireland) Barry McMahon | (United Kingdom) Oliver Smith | (United Kingdom) Johnathan Barrett | (United Kingdom) James Colburn |
| 2 | R4 | Brands Hatch Indy | | No. 57 Derek McMahon Racing | No. 20 Charlie Campbell Racing | No. 20 Charlie Campbell Racing | No. 2 Ramen Racing | No. 34 Saxon Motorsport | No. 62 Westbourne Motors |
| 2 | R4 | Brands Hatch Indy | | (Republic of Ireland) Barry McMahon | (United Kingdom) Charlie Campbell (United Kingdom) Rob Smith | (United Kingdom) Charlie Campbell (United Kingdom) Rob Smith | (United Kingdom) Andrew Bentley (United Kingdom) Peter Spano | (United Kingdom) Alistair Lindsay | (United Kingdom) James Colburn |
| 3 | R5 | Oulton Park | No. 85 Ainge Racing | No. 85 Ainge Racing | No. 85 Ainge Racing | No. 57 Derek McMahon Racing | No. 85 Ainge Racing | No. 34 Saxon Motorsport | No. 41 Westbourne Motors |
| 3 | R5 | Oulton Park | (United Kingdom) Nigel Ainge (United Kingdom) Danny Casser | (United Kingdom) Nigel Ainge (United Kingdom) Danny Casser | (United Kingdom) Nigel Ainge (United Kingdom) Danny Casser | (Republic of Ireland) Barry McMahon | (United Kingdom) Nigel Ainge (United Kingdom) Danny Casser | (United Kingdom) Alistair Lindsay | (United Kingdom) Aaron Thompson (United Kingdom) Steve Thompson |
| 4 | R6 | Silverstone International | No. 57 Derek McMahon Racing | No. 75 Amspeed | No. 75 Amspeed | No. 75 Amspeed | No. 36 JC Racing | No. 19 Reflex Racing | No. 64 Westbourne Motors |
| 4 | R6 | Silverstone International | (Republic of Ireland) Barry McMahon | (United Kingdom) Chris Boardman (United Kingdom) Adam Howarth | (United Kingdom) Chris Boardman (United Kingdom) Adam Howarth | (United Kingdom) Chris Boardman (United Kingdom) Adam Howarth | (United Kingdom) Oliver Smith | (United Kingdom) Steve Griffiths (United Kingdom) Jamie Vynle-Meyers | (United Kingdom) Ben Colburn |
| 4 | R7 | Silverstone International | | No. 75 Amspeed | No. 75 Amspeed | No. 75 Amspeed | No. 36 JC Racing | No. 19 Reflex Racing | No. 62 Westbourne Motors |
| 4 | R7 | Silverstone International | | (United Kingdom) Chris Boardman (United Kingdom) Adam Howarth | (United Kingdom) Chris Boardman (United Kingdom) Adam Howarth | (United Kingdom) Chris Boardman (United Kingdom) Adam Howarth | (United Kingdom) Oliver Smith | (United Kingdom) Steve Griffiths (United Kingdom) Jamie Vynle-Meyers | (United Kingdom) James Colburn |
| 5 | R8 | Snetterton 300 | No. 85 Ainge Racing | No. 20 Charlie Campbell Racing | No. 15 County Classics | No. 20 Charlie Campbell Racing | No. 15 County Classics | No. 34 Saxon Motorsport | No. 41 Westbourne Motors |
| 5 | R8 | Snetterton 300 | (United Kingdom) Nigel Ainge (United Kingdom) Danny Casser | (United Kingdom) Charlie Campbell (United Kingdom) Rob Smith | (United Kingdom) Richard Higgins | (United Kingdom) Charlie Campbell (United Kingdom) Rob Smith | (United Kingdom) Richard Higgins | (United Kingdom) Alistair Lindsay | (United Kingdom) Aaron Thompson (United Kingdom) Steve Thompson |
| 5 | R9 | Snetterton 300 | | No. 36 JC Racing | No. 36 JC Racing | No. 52 S2Smarts | No. 36 JC Racing | No. 37 MacG Racing | No. 41 Westbourne Motors |
| 5 | R9 | Snetterton 300 | | (United Kingdom) Oliver Smith | (United Kingdom) Oliver Smith | (United Kingdom) Rob Baker (United Kingdom) Jonathan Packer | (United Kingdom) Oliver Smith | (United Kingdom) Kelly Brabbin | (United Kingdom) Aaron Thompson (United Kingdom) Steve Thompson |
Non-championship round
| NC | R1 | Spa-Francorchamps | No. 36 JC Racing | No. 36 JC Racing | No. 36 JC Racing | No entries | No. 36 JC Racing | No entries | No entries |
| NC | R1 | Spa-Francorchamps | (United Kingdom) Oliver Smith | (United Kingdom) Oliver Smith | (United Kingdom) Oliver Smith | No entries | (United Kingdom) Oliver Smith | No entries | No entries |
| NC | R2 | Spa-Francorchamps | | No. 36 JC Racing | No. 36 JC Racing | No entries | No. 36 JC Racing | No entries | No entries |
| NC | R2 | Spa-Francorchamps | | (United Kingdom) Oliver Smith | (United Kingdom) Oliver Smith | No entries | (United Kingdom) Oliver Smith | No entries | No entries |

=== Overall championship standings ===
Points are awarded as follows in all classes

| System | 1st | 2nd | 3rd | 4th | 5th | 6th | 7th | 8th | 9th | 10th | 11th | 12th | 13th | 14th | 15th | PP | FL |
|---|---|---|---|---|---|---|---|---|---|---|---|---|---|---|---|---|---|
| +2 | 30 | 27 | 25 | 20 | 19 | 18 | 17 | 16 | 15 | 14 | 13 | 12 | 11 | 10 | 9 | 1 | 1 |

| System | 1st | 2nd | PP | FL |
|---|---|---|---|---|
| -2 | 20 | 17 | 1 | 1 |

| Pos. | Drivers | No. | Class | CRO | | BRH | | OUL | SIL | | SNE | | Pts |
|---|---|---|---|---|---|---|---|---|---|---|---|---|---|
| 1 | (United Kingdom) Oliver Smith | 36 | 6 | NC | 9 | 2 | Ret | 4 | 3 | 4 | Ret | 1 | 191 |
| 2 | (United Kingdom) Johnathan Barrett | 7 | 7 | | | 13 | 13 | 11 | 19 | 17 | 11 | 12 | 188 |
| 3 | (United Kingdom) Charlie Campbell (United Kingdom) Rob Smith | 20 | 5 | | | 21† | 1 | **5** | 8 | 6 | 3 | 7 | 177.5 |
| 4 | (United Kingdom) Charlotte Birch (Brazil) Adriano Medeiros | 27 | 6 | 14 | 12 | 3 | 6 | 7 | 12 | 10 | 2 | Ret | 171 |
| 5 | (United Kingdom) Anthony Hutchins | 80 | 5 | 15 | 14 | 11 | 7 | 8 | 15 | 15 | 17 | Ret | 169 |
| 6 | (United Kingdom) Peter Spano | 2 | 6 | | | 7 | 4 | 9 | 16 | 13 | 14 | 10 | 162 |
| 6 | (United Kingdom) Andrew Bentley | 2 | 6 | | | 7 | 4 | 9 | | | | | 162 |
| 6 | (United Kingdom) Charlie Hollings | 2 | 6 | | | | | | 16 | 13 | 14 | 10 | 162 |
| 7 | (United Kingdom) Edward Cook (United Kingdom) Steve Cook | 83 | 7 | | | 15 | 10 | 14 | 22 | 21 | 12 | 15 | 159 |
| 8 | (United Kingdom) Alistair Lindsay | 34 | 7 | | | Ret | 9 | 10 | 18 | Ret | 8 | 11 | 156 |
| 9 | (United Kingdom) Rob Baker (United Kingdom) Jonathan Packer | 52 | 5 | 9 | 16 | 4 | DNS | | 29† | Ret | 4 | 3 | 148.5 |
| 10 | (United Kingdom) Matty Street (United Kingdom) Andrew Tucker | 67 | 7 | | | 18 | 11 | 15 | 25 | 23 | 18 | 14 | 147 |
| 11 | (United Kingdom) Aaron Thompson (United Kingdom) Steve Thompson | 41 | Clio | | | 9 | 5 | 13 | 13 | 27† | 5 | 6 | 137.5 |
| 12 | (United Kingdom) Brad Kaylor | 87 | 6 | 12 | 11 | 14 | Ret | 16† | 7 | 5 | DNS | DNS | 135.5 |
| 12 | (United Kingdom) Rory Baptiste | 87 | 6 | | | | | | 7 | 5 | | | 135.5 |
| 13 | (Republic of Ireland) Barry McMahon | 57 | 5 | **18** | 10 | **1** | 16† | 2 | **Ret** | DNS | | | 133 |
| 14 | (United Kingdom) Richard Higgins | 15 | 6 | | | | | 6 | 5 | 9 | 1 | 2 | 132 |
| 15 | (United Kingdom) Ivor Mairs | 316 | 7 | | | | | 12 | 20 | 18 | 10 | 13 | 130 |
| 16 | (United Kingdom) James Colburn | 62 | Clio | | | 5 | 2 | 5 | 10 | 8 | | | 118 |
| 17 | (United Kingdom) Luke Pound | 66 | 7 | | | 19 | 12 | Ret | 28† | 26 | 19 | 16 | 102.5 |
| 17 | (United Kingdom) Darren Cook | 66 | 7 | | | | | Ret | | | | | 102.5 |
| 17 | (United Kingdom) Tom Dorman | 66 | 7 | | | | | | 28† | 26 | | | 102.5 |
| 18 | (United Kingdom) Ben Colburn | 64 | Clio | | | 6 | 17† | | 9 | 11 | | | 97.5 |
| 19 | (United Kingdom) Kester Cook | 93 | 5 | | | | | 3 | 4 | 2 | | | 87 |
| 20 | (United Kingdom) Richard Colburn | 63 | Clio | | | 12 | 18 | | 21 | 22 | | | 85 |
| 20 | (United Kingdom) Peter Dorlin | 63 | Clio | | | 12 | 18 | | | | | | 85 |
| 20 | (United Kingdom) David Beecroft | 63 | Clio | | | | | | 21 | 22 | | | 85 |
| 21 | (United Kingdom) Darren Geeraerts | 13 | Clio | | | 17 | 15 | | 23 | 20 | | | 83 |
| 22 | (United Kingdom) Bill Forbes | 6 | 6 | 13 | 13 | | | | 26 | 14 | | | 79 |
| 23 | (United Kingdom) Darren Cook (United Kingdom) Charles Graham | 65 | 7 | | | 20 | 14 | | | | | | 74 |
| 23 | (United Kingdom) James Birch (United Kingdom) Christian Dart | 65 | 7 | | | | | | 27 | 25 | | | 74 |
| 24 | (United Kingdom) Jonny MacGregor (United Kingdom) Josh Tomlinson | 33 | 5 | | | 8 | Ret | Ret | 6 | 28† | | | 61.5 |
| 25 | (United Kingdom) Chrissy Palmer | 98 | 6 | 11 | 15 | | | | | | | | 49 |
| 26 | (United Kingdom) Richard Bernard | 39 | 5 | | | 16 | Ret | Ret | Ret | 19 | | | 47.5 |
| 27 | (United Kingdom) Robert Pugsley | 77 | 5 | | | 10 | 3 | Ret | | | | | 47 |
| 28 | (United Kingdom) Robert Pugsley | 77 | 6 | | | | | | 17 | 7 | Ret | DNS | 44 |
| 29 | (United Kingdom) Chris Clarke | 36 | 6 | 16 | 18† | | | | Ret | DNS | | | 28 |
| 29 | (United Kingdom) Mike Hart | 36 | 6 | 16 | 18† | | | | | | | | 28 |
| 29 | (United Kingdom) Ben Thompson | 36 | 6 | | | | | | Ret | DNS | | | 28 |
| 30 | (United Kingdom) Jasver Sapra | 40 | 5 | Ret | DNS | | | | | | | | 1 |
| – | (United Kingdom) Rob Austin (United Kingdom) James Goodall | 47 | 5 | | | Ret | Ret | | | | | | 0 |
| – | (United Kingdom) Richard Evans | 82 | 6 | DNS | Ret | | | | | | | | 0 |
drivers ineligible for points
| – | (United Kingdom) Chris Boardman (United Kingdom) Adam Howarth | 75 | 5Inv | | | | | | 1 | 1 | | | 0 |
| – | (United Kingdom) Nigel Ainge (United Kingdom) Danny Casser | 85 | 6Inv | | | | | **1** | | | | | 0 |
| – | (United Kingdom) Nigel Ainge (United Kingdom) Danny Casser | 85 | 5Inv | | | | | | 2 | 3 | **15** | Ret | 0 |
| – | (United Kingdom) Tony Prenderclast | 5 | 5Inv | | | | | | | | 6 | 4 | 0 |
| – | (United Kingdom) Matthew Evans | 71 | 5Inv | | | | | | | | 7 | 5 | 0 |
| – | (United Kingdom) Darren Geeraerts (United Kingdom) Anton Spires | 40 | ClioInv | | | | | | | | 9 | 8 | 0 |
| – | (United Kingdom) Kelly Brabbin | 37 | 7Inv | | | | | | | | 16 | 9 | 0 |
| – | (United Kingdom) Toby Goodman (United Kingdom) Colin Tester | 68 | 6Inv | | | | | | 11 | 12 | | | 0 |
| – | (United Kingdom) Nick Beaumont (United Kingdom) Mark Clynes | 96 | 5Inv | | | | | | | | 13 | Ret | 0 |
| – | (United Kingdom) Steve Griffiths (United Kingdom) Jamie Vynle-Meyers | 19 | 7Inv | | | | | | 14 | 16 | | | 0 |
| – | (United Kingdom) Nerys Pearce | 69 | 7Inv | | | | | | 24 | 24 | 20 | 17 | 0 |
| – | (United Kingdom) Abbie Eaton | 69 | 7Inv | | | | | | 24 | 24 | | | 0 |
| – | (United Kingdom) Aaron Morgan | 69 | 7Inv | | | | | | | | 20 | 17 | 0 |
| – | (United Kingdom) Max Hunt (United Kingdom) Stewart Lines | 95 | 5Inv | | | | | | | | Ret | DNS | 0 |
| Pos. | Drivers | No. | Class | CRO | | BRH | | OUL | SIL | | SNE | | Pts |

Key
| Colour | Result |
|---|---|
| Gold | Winner |
| Silver | Second place |
| Bronze | Third place |
| Green | Other points position |
| Blue | Other classified position |
| Blue | Not classified, finished (NC) |
| Purple | Not classified, retired (Ret) |
| Red | Did not qualify (DNQ) |
| Red | Did not pre-qualify (DNPQ) |
| Black | Disqualified (DSQ) |
| White | Did not start (DNS) |
| White | Race cancelled (C) |
| Blank | Did not practice (DNP) |
| Blank | Excluded (EX) |
| Blank | Did not arrive (DNA) |
| Blank | Withdrawn (WD) |
| Blank | Did not enter (cell empty) |
| Text formatting | Meaning |
| **Bold** | Pole position |
| Italics | Fastest lap |

† – Drivers did not finish the race, but were classified as they completed over 60% of the race distance and were awarded half points.

=== Class championship standings ===
Points are awarded as follows in all classes

| System | 1st | 2nd | 3rd | 4th | 5th | 6th | 7th | 8th | 9th | 10th | 11th | 12th | 13th | 14th | 15th | PP | FL |
|---|---|---|---|---|---|---|---|---|---|---|---|---|---|---|---|---|---|
| +2 | 30 | 27 | 25 | 20 | 19 | 18 | 17 | 16 | 15 | 14 | 13 | 12 | 11 | 10 | 9 | 1 | 1 |

| System | 1st | 2nd | PP | FL |
|---|---|---|---|---|
| -2 | 20 | 17 | 1 | 1 |

| Pos. | Drivers | No. | CRO | | BRH | | OUL | SIL | | SNE | | Pts |
Class 5
| 1 | (United Kingdom) Charlie Campbell (United Kingdom) Rob Smith | 20 | | | 21† | 1 | **5** | 8 | 6 | **3** | 7 | 177.5 |
| 2 | (United Kingdom) Anthony Hutchins | 80 | 15 | 14 | 11 | 7 | 8 | 15 | 15 | 17 | Ret | 169 |
| 3 | (United Kingdom) Rob Baker (United Kingdom) Jonathan Packer | 52 | 9 | 16 | 4 | DNS | | 29† | Ret | 4 | 3 | 148.5 |
| 4 | (Republic of Ireland) Barry McMahon | 57 | **18** | 10 | **1** | 16† | 2 | **Ret** | DNS | | | 133 |
| 5 | (United Kingdom) Kester Cook | 93 | | | | | 3 | 4 | 2 | | | 87 |
| 6 | (United Kingdom) Jonny MacGregor (United Kingdom) Josh Tomlinson | 33 | | | 8 | Ret | Ret | 6 | 28† | | | 61.5 |
| 7 | (United Kingdom) Richard Bernard | 39 | | | 16 | Ret | 17† | Ret | 19 | | | 47.5 |
| 8 | (United Kingdom) Robert Pugsley | 77 | | | 10 | 3 | Ret | | | | | 47 |
| 9 | (United Kingdom) Jasver Sapra | 40 | Ret | DNS | | | | | | | | 1 |
| – | (United Kingdom) Rob Austin (United Kingdom) James Goodall | 47 | | | Ret | Ret | | | | | | 0 |
drivers ineligible for points
| – | (United Kingdom) Chris Boardman (United Kingdom) Adam Howarth | 75 | | | | | | 1 | 1 | | | 0 |
| – | (United Kingdom) Nigel Ainge (United Kingdom) Danny Casser | 85 | | | | | | 2 | 3 | **15** | Ret | 0 |
| – | (United Kingdom) Tony Prenderclast | 5 | | | | | | | | 6 | 4 | 0 |
| – | (United Kingdom) Matthew Evans | 71 | | | | | | | | 7 | 5 | 0 |
| – | (United Kingdom) Nick Beaumont (United Kingdom) Mark Clynes | 96 | | | | | | | | 13 | Ret | 0 |
| – | (United Kingdom) Max Hunt (United Kingdom) Stewart Lines | 95 | | | | | | | | Ret | DNS | 0 |
Class 6
| 1 | (United Kingdom) Oliver Smith | 36 | **NC** | 9 | **2** | Ret | **4** | **3** | 4 | Ret | 1 | 191 |
| 2 | (United Kingdom) Charlotte Birch (Brazil) Adriano Medeiros | 27 | 14 | 12 | 3 | 6 | 7 | 12 | 10 | 2 | Ret | 171 |
| 3 | (United Kingdom) Peter Spano | 2 | | | 7 | 4 | 9 | 16 | 13 | 14 | 10 | 162 |
| 3 | (United Kingdom) Andrew Bentley | 2 | | | 7 | 4 | 9 | | | | | 162 |
| 3 | (United Kingdom) Charlie Hollings | 2 | | | | | | 16 | 13 | 14 | 10 | 162 |
| 4 | (United Kingdom) Brad Kaylor | 87 | 12 | 11 | 14 | Ret | 16† | 7 | 5 | DNS | DNS | 135.5 |
| 4 | (United Kingdom) Rory Baptiste | 87 | | | | | | 7 | 5 | | | 135.5 |
| 5 | (United Kingdom) Richard Higgins | 15 | | | | | 6 | 5 | 9 | 1 | 2 | 132 |
| 6 | (United Kingdom) Bill Forbes | 6 | 13 | 13 | | | | 26 | 14 | | | 79 |
| 7 | (United Kingdom) Chrissy Palmer | 98 | 11 | 15 | | | | | | | | 49 |
| 8 | (United Kingdom) Robert Pugsley | 77 | | | | | | 17 | 7 | **Ret** | DNS | 44 |
| 9 | (United Kingdom) Chris Clarke | 36 | 16 | 18† | | | | Ret | DNS | | | 28 |
| 9 | (United Kingdom) Mike Hart | 36 | 16 | 18† | | | | | | | | 28 |
| 9 | (United Kingdom) Ben Thompson | 36 | | | | | | Ret | DNS | | | 28 |
| – | (United Kingdom) Richard Evans | 82 | DNS | Ret | | | | | | | | 0 |
drivers ineligible for points
| – | (United Kingdom) Nigel Ainge (United Kingdom) Danny Casser | 85 | | | | | **1** | | | | | 0 |
| – | (United Kingdom) Toby Goodman (United Kingdom) Colin Tester | 68 | | | | | | 11 | 12 | | | 0 |
Class 7
| 1 | (United Kingdom) Johnathan Barrett | 7 | | | 13 | 13 | 11 | 19 | 17 | 11 | 12 | 188 |
| 2 | (United Kingdom) Edward Cook (United Kingdom) Steve Cook | 83 | | | 15 | 10 | 14 | 22 | 21 | 12 | 15 | 159 |
| 3 | (United Kingdom) Alistair Lindsay | 34 | | | **Ret** | 9 | **10** | **18** | Ret | 8 | 11 | 156 |
| 4 | (United Kingdom) Matty Street (United Kingdom) Andrew Tucker | 67 | | | 18 | 11 | 15 | 25 | 23 | 18 | 14 | 147 |
| 5 | (United Kingdom) Ivor Mairs | 316 | | | | | 12 | 20 | 18 | **10** | 13 | 130 |
| 6 | (United Kingdom) Luke Pound | 66 | | | 19 | 12 | Ret | 28† | 26 | 19 | 16 | 102.5 |
| 6 | (United Kingdom) Darren Cook | 66 | | | | | Ret | | | | | 102.5 |
| 6 | (United Kingdom) Tom Dorman | 66 | | | | | | 28† | 26 | | | 102.5 |
| 7 | (United Kingdom) Darren Cook (United Kingdom) Charles Graham | 65 | | | 20 | 14 | | | | | | 74 |
| 7 | (United Kingdom) James Birch (United Kingdom) Christian Dart | 65 | | | | | | 27 | 25 | | | 74 |
drivers ineligible for points
| – | (United Kingdom) Kelly Brabbin | 37 | | | | | | | | 16 | 9 | 0 |
| – | (United Kingdom) Steve Griffiths (United Kingdom) Jamie Vynle-Meyers | 19 | | | | | | 14 | 16 | | | 0 |
| – | (United Kingdom) Nerys Pearce | 69 | | | | | | 24 | 24 | 20 | 17 | 0 |
| – | (United Kingdom) Abbie Eaton | 69 | | | | | | 24 | 24 | | | 0 |
| – | (United Kingdom) Aaron Morgan | 69 | | | | | | | | 20 | 17 | 0 |
Clios
| 1 | (United Kingdom) Aaron Thompson (United Kingdom) Steve Thompson | 41 | | | 9 | 5 | **13** | 13 | 27† | **5** | 6 | 137.5 |
| 2 | (United Kingdom) James Colburn | 62 | | | 5 | 2 | | 10 | 8 | | | 118 |
| 3 | (United Kingdom) Ben Colburn | 64 | | | **6** | 17† | | **9** | 11 | | | 97.5 |
| 4 | (United Kingdom) Richard Colburn | 63 | | | 12 | 18 | | 21 | 22 | | | 85 |
| 4 | (United Kingdom) Peter Dorlin | 63 | | | 12 | 18 | | | | | | 85 |
| 4 | (United Kingdom) David Beecroft | 63 | | | | | | 21 | 22 | | | 85 |
| 5 | (United Kingdom) Darren Geeraerts | 13 | | | 17 | 15 | | 23 | 20 | | | 83 |
drivers ineligible for points
| – | (United Kingdom) Darren Geeraerts (United Kingdom) Anton Spires | 30 | | | | | | | | 9 | 8 | 0 |
| Pos. | Drivers | No. | CRO | | BRH | | OUL | SIL | | SNE | | Pts |

† – Drivers did not finish the race, but were classified as they completed over 60% of the race distance and were awarded half points.
