= 1996 British Touring Car Championship =

39th season of the British Touring Car Championship

1996 BTCC season

Seasons
- ← 1995 1997 →

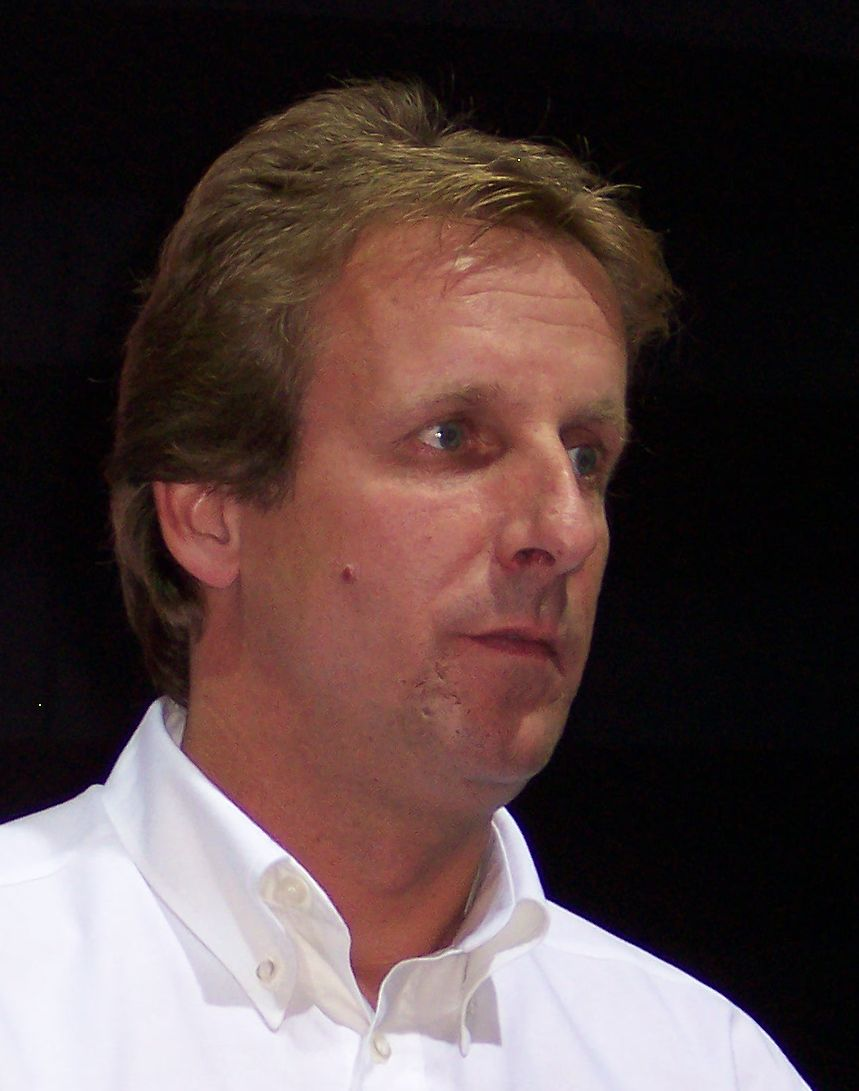
Frank Biela, the 1996 British Touring Car Champion.

The 1996 Auto Trader RAC British Touring Car Championship season marked the arrival of Audi to the sport with their four wheel drive A4s. The title was won by Frank Biela, with Swiss driver Alain Menu again finishing in second place and Swede Rickard Rydell in third.

== Season summary ==
After seeing the success that rivals BMW and Alfa Romeo had achieved in the series, and wanting to expand their successful touring car programme, Audi entered a works team for the season, headed up by Audi Sport UK's Frank Biela. Biela had won multiple touring car championships and the 1995 Touring Car World Cup for the Four Rings. The Audi A4 proved the class of the field from the get go, helped considerably by its four wheel drive system. This led to an argument between the manufacturers throughout the season, and a weight penalty was added to the Audis. It did not help much; Biela dominated the season and won the title with 4 races to run, one of 7 titles won by the Audi A4 Quattro in 1996. Joining Biela at Audi was rookie John Bintcliffe, winner of the 1995 Ford Fiesta championship and the 1994 Renault Clio Cup. The Yorkshireman would finish seventh in the standings.

Williams Renault were seen as the team to beat before the start of the year after a strong finish to 1995, with Alain Menu title favourite. Early season reliability issues meant that the Swiss driver was never really in title contention but a strong second half of the year allowed him to take runners up spot for the third year in a row. Team mate Will Hoy endured a tough season despite starting strongly, finishing 2nd to Biela in the opening two rounds. He would visit the podium just once more on his way to 9th overall and the following season would move to the Ford team.

Volvo, run by Tom Walkinshaw Racing, developed the 850 further, allowing Rickard Rydell to challenge for wins throughout the year and the Swede was Biela's closest challenger for most of the season. His new team-mate Kelvin Burt, switching from Ford, took a single victory at Silverstone in May. During the following round at Oulton Park he was involved in a vicious accident, knocking him unconscious and having to be cut free from the car. He was taken to Chester Hospital suffering from severe concussion. Burt would miss the next round at Snetterton and was due to be replaced by British Formula 3 driver Jamie Davies, however Davies crashed the car heavily in testing, destroying it and also suffering a concussion, but was otherwise unharmed. As a result Volvo entered just one car for Rydell and Burt would return at the following meeting.

Vauxhall retained their title winning driver line up of John Cleland and James Thompson driving the new Vectra. The new car had a difficult development and was not as mechanically suited to racing as the Cavalier was. Thompson took the team's only win of the season, while Cleland would only finish 8th in the driver's championship.

Ford switched from Andy Rouse to West Surrey Racing to run the Mondeo in cooperation with race car engineering specialist Reynard and Schubel Engineering who built the Mondeo for the equivalent Super Tourenwagen Cup in Germany. The season was a complete disaster with the car proving to be off the pace and unreliable. Paul Radisich suffered 13 retirements in 24 races while his new team-mate Steve Robertson scored just two points all season.

Honda continued their promise of 1995 despite a slow start David Leslie took three wins during the second half of the season, including the British Grand Prix support race. He was once again joined by James Kaye, although he was unable to match Leslie’s results.

After a disappointing 1995, BMW factory outfit Team Schnitzer returned to the series with 1993 champion Joachim Winkelhock and multiple touring car title winner Roberto Ravaglia leading the team, with Peter Kox running in a third car in selected races. Winkelhock took several wins during the year but was too inconsistent to challenge his compatriot for the title, whilst Ravaglia only won a single race and was mostly remembered for a string contentious moments with the likes of Radisich and Menu during the season.

Total Team Peugeot entered the new 406 model, but Tim Harvey and Patrick Watts struggled for pace and suffered poor reliability throughout the season.

Having been dropped by Ford, Andy Rouse ran a semi-works Nissan team, running Primeras for Gary Ayles and Owen McAuley, but results were limited. McAuley left the team after the British GP support rounds when it became clear the team were only going to get one new 1996-spec car and that would be driven by his team-mate. The team entered just one car thereafter until the final round at Brands Hatch where Jamie Spence drove the 1995 spec car.

In the Total Cup for Independents 1995 Renault Clio Cup champion Lee Brookes entered a 1995 TOM's built Toyota Carina and would secure the title in his debut season beating Richard Kaye's Mint Motorsport Vauxhall, the last RML built Cavalier. The combination was fastest of the non-works teams and Yorkshire-man won the class 16 times but lost out to Brookes on consistency.

Having lost out in their bid to win the Ford works deal Team Dynamics developed their own Ford Mondeos for Matt Neal and Robb Gravett. Success was limited with Neal finishing a distant 3rd in class. He later described the car as the worst he's ever driven and kissed the ground after the final round as he'd never have to drive the car again.

Ian Heward entered selected rounds in an ageing Vauxhall Cavalier but the car lacked competitiveness and was a long way from the pace of the other independent runners.

== Teams and drivers ==
=== BTCC ===
Team	Car	No.	Drivers	Rounds
Manufacturers
(United Kingdom) Vauxhall Sport	Vauxhall Vectra	1	(United Kingdom) John Cleland	All
(United Kingdom) Vauxhall Sport	Vauxhall Vectra	7	(United Kingdom) James Thompson	All
(France) Williams Renault Dealer Racing	Renault Laguna	2	(Switzerland) Alain Menu	All
(France) Williams Renault Dealer Racing	Renault Laguna	4	(United Kingdom) Will Hoy	All
(Sweden) Volvo 850 Racing	Volvo 850 20v	3	(Sweden) Rickard Rydell	All
(Sweden) Volvo 850 Racing	Volvo 850 20v	8	(United Kingdom) Kelvin Burt	1–5, 7–13
(Sweden) Volvo 850 Racing	Volvo 850 20v	28	(United Kingdom) Jamie Davies	None
(France) Total Team Peugeot	Peugeot 406	5	(United Kingdom) Tim Harvey	All
(France) Total Team Peugeot	Peugeot 406	10	(United Kingdom) Patrick Watts	All
(New Zealand) Valvoline Team Mondeo with Reynard	Ford Mondeo	6	(New Zealand) Paul Radisich	All
(New Zealand) Valvoline Team Mondeo with Reynard	Ford Mondeo	16	(United Kingdom) Steve Robertson	All
(United Kingdom) Honda Team MSD	Honda Accord	11	(United Kingdom) David Leslie	All
(United Kingdom) Honda Team MSD	Honda Accord	12	(United Kingdom) James Kaye	All
(Germany) BMW Team Schnitzer	BMW 320i	20	(Netherlands) Peter Kox	11–13
(Germany) BMW Team Schnitzer	BMW 320i	21	(Italy) Roberto Ravaglia	All
(Germany) BMW Team Schnitzer	BMW 320i	22	(Germany) Joachim Winkelhock	All
(United Kingdom) Audi Sport UK	Audi A4 quattro	44	(United Kingdom) John Bintcliffe	All
(United Kingdom) Audi Sport UK	Audi A4 quattro	45	(Germany) Frank Biela	All
Semi-Works
(United Kingdom) Rouse Sport	Nissan Primera eGT	14	(United Kingdom) Gary Ayles	1–9, 11–13
(United Kingdom) Rouse Sport	Nissan Primera eGT	15	(United Kingdom) Owen McAuley	1–8
(United Kingdom) Rouse Sport	Nissan Primera eGT	15	(United Kingdom) Jamie Spence	13
Independents
(Japan) TOM's Team Brookes	Toyota Carina E	17	(United Kingdom) Lee Brookes	All
(United Kingdom) ProMotor Sport	Vauxhall Cavalier	18	(United Kingdom) Ian Heward	2, 10–12
(United Kingdom) Mint Motorsport	Vauxhall Cavalier	23	(United Kingdom) Richard Kaye	All
(United Kingdom) Team Dynamics	Ford Mondeo Si	27	(United Kingdom) Robb Gravett	1–5, 8–9
(United Kingdom) Team Dynamics	Ford Mondeo Si	77	(United Kingdom) Matt Neal	2–4, 6, 8–13

- Rouse Sport were neither a works nor an independent entry.
- Jamie Davies would have stood in for Kelvin Burt at Round 6 (Snetterton) but was sidelined by a testing accident prior to the event.

=== RAC Tourist Trophy ===
Team	Car	No.	Drivers
Manufacturers
(France) Williams Renault Dealer Racing	Renault Laguna	2	(Switzerland) Alain Menu
(France) Williams Renault Dealer Racing	Renault Laguna	9	(United Kingdom) Will Hoy
(Germany) BMW Team Schnitzer	BMW 320i	5	(Germany) Joachim Winkelhock
(United Kingdom) Audi Sport UK	Audi A4 quattro	7	(United Kingdom) John Bintcliffe
(United Kingdom) Vauxhall Sport	Vauxhall Vectra	8	(United Kingdom) John Cleland
(United Kingdom) Vauxhall Sport	Vauxhall Vectra	28	(Sweden) Jan Brunstedt
(Sweden) Volvo 850 Racing	Volvo 850 20v	11	(United Kingdom) Kelvin Burt
(United Kingdom) Honda Team Linder	Honda Accord	14	(Germany) Marco Werner
(United Kingdom) Honda Team Linder	Honda Accord	24	(United Kingdom) James Kaye
(New Zealand) Valvoline Team Mondeo	Ford Mondeo	15	(United Kingdom) Warren Hughes
(France) Total Team Peugeot	Peugeot 406	16	(United Kingdom) Tim Harvey
Independents
(United Kingdom) Yap Motorsport	Honda Accord	12	(United Kingdom) Eugene O'Brien
(United Kingdom) ProMotor Sport	Vauxhall Cavalier	18	(United Kingdom) Ian Heward
(United Kingdom) Mint Motorsport	Vauxhall Cavalier	23	(United Kingdom) Hamish Irvine

== Race calendar and results ==
All races were held in the United Kingdom.

Round		Circuit	Date	Pole position	Fastest lap	Winning driver	Winning team	Winning independent
1	R1	Donington Park (GP), Leicestershire	8 April	(Sweden) Rickard Rydell	(Germany) Frank Biela	(Germany) Frank Biela	Audi Sport UK	(United Kingdom) Robb Gravett
1	R2	Donington Park (GP), Leicestershire	8 April	(Germany) Frank Biela	(Germany) Frank Biela	(Germany) Frank Biela	Audi Sport UK	(United Kingdom) Richard Kaye
2	R3	Brands Hatch (Indy), Kent	21 April	(Switzerland) Alain Menu	(Switzerland) Alain Menu (Sweden) Rickard Rydell	(Germany) Frank Biela	Audi Sport UK	(United Kingdom) Richard Kaye
2	R4	Brands Hatch (Indy), Kent	21 April	(Germany) Joachim Winkelhock	(Germany) Joachim Winkelhock	(Germany) Joachim Winkelhock	BMW Team Schnitzer	(United Kingdom) Richard Kaye
3	R5	Thruxton Circuit, Hampshire	6 May	(Germany) Frank Biela	(Germany) Frank Biela	(Germany) Frank Biela	Audi Sport UK	(United Kingdom) Lee Brookes
3	R6	Thruxton Circuit, Hampshire	6 May	(Germany) Joachim Winkelhock	(Germany) Joachim Winkelhock	(Germany) Joachim Winkelhock	BMW Team Schnitzer	(United Kingdom) Lee Brookes
4	R7	Silverstone Circuit (International), Northamptonshire	19 May	(Italy) Roberto Ravaglia	(United Kingdom) Kelvin Burt	(United Kingdom) Kelvin Burt	Volvo 850 Racing	(United Kingdom) Richard Kaye
4	R8	Silverstone Circuit (International), Northamptonshire	19 May	(Germany) Frank Biela	(Germany) Joachim Winkelhock	(Germany) Frank Biela	Audi Sport UK	(United Kingdom) Richard Kaye
5	R9	Oulton Park (International), Cheshire	27 May	(Germany) Frank Biela	(Germany) Joachim Winkelhock	(Germany) Joachim Winkelhock	BMW Team Schnitzer	(United Kingdom) Richard Kaye
5	R10	Oulton Park (International), Cheshire	27 May	(Germany) Frank Biela	(Sweden) Rickard Rydell	(Sweden) Rickard Rydell	Volvo 850 Racing	(United Kingdom) Lee Brookes
6	R11	Snetterton Circuit, Norfolk	16 June	(Germany) Joachim Winkelhock	(Germany) Joachim Winkelhock	(United Kingdom) James Thompson	Vauxhall Sport	(United Kingdom) Richard Kaye
6	R12	Snetterton Circuit, Norfolk	16 June	(Germany) Joachim Winkelhock	(Sweden) Rickard Rydell	(Germany) Joachim Winkelhock	BMW Team Schnitzer	(United Kingdom) Richard Kaye
7	R13	Brands Hatch (GP), Kent	30 June	(Switzerland) Alain Menu	(Switzerland) Alain Menu	(Switzerland) Alain Menu	Williams Renault Dealer Racing	(United Kingdom) Richard Kaye
7	R14	Brands Hatch (GP), Kent	30 June	(Switzerland) Alain Menu	(Switzerland) Alain Menu	(Switzerland) Alain Menu	Williams Renault Dealer Racing	(United Kingdom) Lee Brookes
8	R15	Silverstone Circuit (GP), Northamptonshire	14 July	(United Kingdom) David Leslie	(Germany) Frank Biela	(Italy) Roberto Ravaglia	BMW Team Schnitzer	(United Kingdom) Richard Kaye
8	R16	Silverstone Circuit (GP), Northamptonshire	14 July	(United Kingdom) David Leslie	(Sweden) Rickard Rydell	(United Kingdom) David Leslie	Honda Team MSD	(United Kingdom) Richard Kaye
9	R17	Knockhill Racing Circuit, Fife	28 July	(Sweden) Rickard Rydell	(Germany) Frank Biela	(Germany) Frank Biela	Audi Sport UK	(United Kingdom) Richard Kaye
9	R18	Knockhill Racing Circuit, Fife	28 July	(Sweden) Rickard Rydell	(United Kingdom) John Bintcliffe	(Sweden) Rickard Rydell	Volvo 850 Racing	(United Kingdom) Matt Neal
10	R19	Oulton Park (Fosters), Cheshire	11 August	(United Kingdom) David Leslie	(Germany) Frank Biela	(Switzerland) Alain Menu	Williams Renault Dealer Racing	(United Kingdom) Richard Kaye
10	R20	Oulton Park (Fosters), Cheshire	11 August	(Germany) Frank Biela	(Germany) Frank Biela	(Germany) Frank Biela	Audi Sport UK	(United Kingdom) Richard Kaye
11	R21	Thruxton Circuit, Hampshire	26 August	(Switzerland) Alain Menu	(United Kingdom) David Leslie	(United Kingdom) David Leslie	Honda Team MSD	(United Kingdom) Lee Brookes
11	R22	Thruxton Circuit, Hampshire	26 August	(Germany) Joachim Winkelhock	(Netherlands) Peter Kox	(Sweden) Rickard Rydell	Volvo 850 Racing	(United Kingdom) Richard Kaye
12	R23	Donington Park (GP), Leicestershire	8 September	(Sweden) Rickard Rydell	(Sweden) Rickard Rydell	(Sweden) Rickard Rydell	Volvo 850 Racing	(United Kingdom) Richard Kaye
12	R24	Donington Park (GP), Leicestershire	8 September	(Sweden) Rickard Rydell	(Germany) Joachim Winkelhock	(United Kingdom) David Leslie	Honda Team MSD	(United Kingdom) Lee Brookes
13	R25	Brands Hatch (Indy), Kent	22 September	(Germany) Joachim Winkelhock	(Netherlands) Peter Kox	(Switzerland) Alain Menu	Williams Renault Dealer Racing	(United Kingdom) Matt Neal
13	R26	Brands Hatch (Indy), Kent	22 September	(Germany) Joachim Winkelhock	(Netherlands) Peter Kox	(Germany) Frank Biela	Audi Sport UK	(United Kingdom) Matt Neal

== Championships standings ==
Points system
**1st**	**2nd**	**3rd**	**4th**	**5th**	**6th**	**7th**	**8th**	**9th**	**10th**	Pole position
15	12	10	8	6	5	4	3	2	1	1

Note: **bold** signifies pole position (1 point awarded all races), italics signifies fastest lap.

=== Drivers Championship ===
Pos	Driver	DON		BRH		THR		SIL		OUL		SNE		BRH		SIL		KNO		OUL		THR		DON		BRH		Pts
1	(Germany) Frank Biela	1	**1**	1	4	**1**	3	11	**1**	**2**	**2**	2	DSQ	2	8	3	2	1	2	2	**1**	2	3	4	3	4	1	289
2	(Switzerland) Alain Menu	3	Ret	**2**	2	Ret	DNS	5	4	5	4	Ret	3	**1**	**1**	6	5	9	Ret	1	3	**Ret**	4	3	2	1	4	197
3	(Sweden) Rickard Rydell	**Ret**	3	4	3	3	8	4	5	4	1	Ret	5	3	12	2	4	**4**	**1**	5	Ret	3	1	**1**	**Ret**	5	Ret	194
4	(United Kingdom) David Leslie	Ret	Ret	10	Ret	8	5	3	9	8	7	9	Ret	5	7	**4**	**1**	6	7	**3**	2	1	8	2	1	3	5	159
5	(Germany) Joachim Winkelhock	8	13	3	**1**	12	**1**	Ret	Ret	1	Ret	**5**	**1**	6	2	5	Ret	5	5	6	4	Ret	**6**	7	6	**DNS**	**3**	158
6	(Italy) Roberto Ravaglia	7	7	6	6	6	2	**2**	2	7	5	Ret	Ret	9	Ret	1	3	3	3	9	5	4	5	Ret	5	NC	2	157
7	(United Kingdom) John Bintcliffe	6	4	16	5	2	7	7	3	3	3	6	6	11	13	11	10	2	4	Ret	9	6	11	8	13	9	10	113
8	(United Kingdom) John Cleland	5	6	7	Ret	4	4	10	Ret	Ret	9	3	2	10	4	10	Ret	Ret	6	7	7	5	7	6	8	6	Ret	102
9	(United Kingdom) Will Hoy	2	2	17	DSQ	5	15	8	Ret	Ret	6	7	9	4	3	9	6	10	11	4	Ret	Ret	19	5	4	8	Ret	95
10	(United Kingdom) James Thompson	10	Ret	Ret	7	7	6	6	6	17	Ret	1	4	7	5	8	7	Ret	Ret	Ret	6	Ret	2	Ret	9	DNS	DNS	83
11	(United Kingdom) Kelvin Burt	4	5	Ret	Ret	DSQ	13	1	Ret	6	DNS			8	6	7	8	Ret	10	8	8	Ret	17	9	12	7	7	66
12	(United Kingdom) James Kaye	9	10	9	11	Ret	9	9	8	13	Ret	Ret	7	Ret	14	Ret	11	8	8	10	10	8	9	Ret	10	DNS	8	33
13	(New Zealand) Paul Radisich	Ret	8	5	8	Ret	Ret	Ret	7	Ret	Ret	Ret	8	Ret	11	Ret	9	7	9	Ret	11	Ret	Ret	17	11	Ret	Ret	27
14	(Netherlands) Peter Kox																					7	10	12	7	2	6	26
15	(United Kingdom) Tim Harvey	11	9	Ret	9	Ret	Ret	13	Ret	Ret	8	4	Ret	Ret	9	Ret	13	Ret	Ret	Ret	Ret	Ret	12	10	14	13	9	20
16	(United Kingdom) Patrick Watts	Ret	Ret	8	10	Ret	10	12	Ret	11	11	Ret	12	Ret	15	Ret	Ret	Ret	DNS	Ret	DNS	Ret	Ret	Ret	Ret	10	11	6
17	(United Kingdom) Richard Kaye	15	14	14	14	DNS	NC	14	10	9	Ret	8	11	12	DSQ	12	14	11	15	11	13	DNS	15	13	16	DNS	DNS	6
18	(United Kingdom) Owen McAuley	14	12	13	DNS	9	11	16	Ret	15	10	11	Ret	15	Ret	Ret	Ret											3
19	(United Kingdom) Lee Brookes	13	15	15	Ret	10	12	18	11	14	14	12	13	14	17	14	16	13	14	12	15	9	16	15	15	14	14	3
20	(United Kingdom) Steve Robertson	Ret	DNS	12	12	Ret	Ret	Ret	13	10	13	13	10	13	16	Ret	12	12	12	Ret	12	Ret	14	16	17	DNS	DNS	2
21	(United Kingdom) Gary Ayles	Ret	11	11	13	DNS	DNS	15	12	12	12	10	14	Ret	10	13	15	Ret	DNS			11	13	11	Ret	DNS	12	2
22	(United Kingdom) Matt Neal			Ret	16	11	Ret	17	Ret			Ret	DNS			Ret	17	14	13	13	14	10	18	14	Ret	12	13	1
23	(United Kingdom) Jamie Spence																									11	Ret	0
24	(United Kingdom) Robb Gravett	12	Ret	Ret	15	13	14	19	Ret	16	15					Ret	18	15	16									0
25	(United Kingdom) Ian Heward			DNS	DNS															DNS	DNS	12	Ret	18	18			0
-	(United Kingdom) Jamie Davies											WD	WD															0
Pos	Driver	DON		BRH		THR		SIL		OUL		SNE		BRH		SIL		KNO		OUL		THR		DON		BRH		Pts

=== Privateers Championship ===
Pos	Driver	DON		BRH		THR		SIL		OUL		SNE		BRH		SIL		KNO		OUL		THR		DON		BRH		Pts
1	(United Kingdom) Lee Brookes	13	15	15	Ret	10	12	18	11	14	14	12	13	14	17	14	16	13	14	12	15	9	16	15	15	14	14	**312**
2	(United Kingdom) Richard Kaye	15	14	14	14	DNS	NC	14	10	9	Ret	8	11	12	DSQ	12	14	11	15	11	13	DNS	15	13	16	DNS	DNS	**272**
3	(United Kingdom) Matt Neal			Ret	16	11	Ret	17	Ret			Ret	DNS			Ret	17	14	13	13	14	10	18	14	Ret	12	13	**155**
4	(United Kingdom) Robb Gravett	12	Ret	Ret	15	13	14	19	Ret	16	15					Ret	18	15	16									**103**
5	(United Kingdom) Ian Heward			DNS	DNS															DNS	DNS	12	Ret	18	18			**28**
Pos	Driver	DON		BRH		THR		SIL		OUL		SNE		BRH		SIL		KNO		OUL		THR		DON		BRH		Pts

Colour	Result
Gold	Winner
Silver	Second place
Bronze	Third place
Green	Points classification
Blue	Non-points classification
Blue	Non-classified finish (NC)
Purple	Retired, not classified (Ret)
Red	Did not qualify (DNQ)
Red	Did not pre-qualify (DNPQ)
Black	Disqualified (DSQ)
White	Did not start (DNS)
White	Withdrew (WD)
White	Race cancelled (C)
Blank	Did not practice (DNP)
Blank	Did not arrive (DNA)
Blank	Excluded (EX)

=== Manufacturers Championship ===
Pos	Manufacturer	DON		BRH		THR		SIL		OUL		SNE		BRH		SIL		KNO		OUL		THR		DON		BRH		Pts
1	Audi / Audi Sport UK	1	1	1	4	1	3	7	1	2	2	2	6	2	8	3	2	1	2	2	1	2	3	4	3	4	1	298
2	BMW / BMW Team Schnitzer	7	7	3	1	6	1	2	2	1	5	5	1	6	2	1	3	3	3	6	4	4	5	7	5	2	2	258
3	Volvo / Volvo 850 Racing	4	3	4	3	3	8	1	5	4	1	Ret	5	3	6	2	4	4	1	5	8	3	1	1	12	5	7	244
4	Renault / Williams Renault Dealer Racing	2	2	2	2	5	15	5	4	5	4	7	3	1	1	6	5	9	11	1	3	Ret	4	3	2	1	4	243
5	Honda / Honda Team MSD	9	10	9	11	8	5	3	8	8	7	9	7	5	7	4	1	6	7	3	2	1	8	2	1	3	5	201
6	Vauxhall / Vauxhall Sport	5	6	7	7	4	4	6	6	17	9	1	2	7	4	8	7	Ret	6	7	6	5	2	6	8	6	Ret	172
7	Peugeot / Total Team Peugeot	11	9	8	9	Ret	10	12	Ret	11	8	4	12	Ret	9	Ret	13	Ret	Ret	Ret	Ret	Ret	12	10	14	10	9	74
8	Ford / Valvoline Team Mondeo	Ret	8	5	8	Ret	Ret	Ret	7	10	13	13	8	12	11	Ret	9	7	9	Ret	11	Ret	14	16	11	Ret	Ret	74
Pos	Manufacturer	DON		BRH		THR		SIL		OUL		SNE		BRH		SIL		KNO		OUL		THR		DON		BRH		Pts

=== Teams Championship ===
Pos	Team	DON		BRH		THR		SIL		OUL		SNE		BRH		SIL		KNO		OUL		THR		DON		BRH		Pts
1	Audi Sport UK	1	1	1	4	1	3	7	1	2	2	2	6	2	8	3	2	1	2	2	1	2	3	4	3	4	1	396
1	Audi Sport UK	6	4	16	5	2	7	11	3	3	3	6	DSQ	11	13	11	10	2	4	Ret	9	6	11	8	13	9	10	396
2	BMW Team Schnitzer	7	7	3	1	6	1	2	2	1	5	5	1	6	2	1	3	3	3	6	4	4	5	7	5	2	2	323
2	BMW Team Schnitzer	8	13	6	6	12	2	Ret	Ret	7	Ret	Ret	Ret	9	Ret	5	Ret	5	5	9	5	7	6	12	6	NC	3	323
3	Williams Renault Dealer Racing	2	2	2	2	5	15	5	4	5	4	7	3	1	1	6	5	9	11	1	3	Ret	4	3	2	1	4	288
3	Williams Renault Dealer Racing	3	Ret	17	DSQ	Ret	DNS	8	Ret	Ret	6	Ret	9	4	3	9	6	10	Ret	4	Ret	Ret	19	5	4	8	Ret	288
4	Volvo 850 Racing	4	3	4	3	3	8	1	5	4	1	Ret	5	3	6	2	4	4	1	5	8	3	1	1	12	5	7	255
4	Volvo 850 Racing	Ret	5	Ret	Ret	DSQ	13	4	Ret	6	DNS			8	12	7	8	Ret	10	8	Ret	Ret	17	9	Ret	7	Ret	255
5	Honda Team MSD	9	10	9	11	8	5	3	8	8	7	9	7	5	7	4	1	6	7	3	2	1	8	2	1	3	5	186
5	Honda Team MSD	Ret	Ret	10	Ret	Ret	9	9	9	13	Ret	Ret	Ret	Ret	14	Ret	11	8	8	10	10	8	9	Ret	10	DNS	8	186
6	Vauxhall Sport	5	6	7	7	4	4	6	6	17	9	1	2	7	4	8	7	Ret	6	7	6	5	2	6	8	6	Ret	185
6	Vauxhall Sport	10	Ret	Ret	Ret	7	6	10	Ret	Ret	Ret	3	4	10	5	10	Ret	Ret	Ret	Ret	7	Ret	7	Ret	9	DNS	DNS	185
7	Valvoline Team Mondeo	Ret	8	5	8	Ret	Ret	Ret	7	10	13	13	8	13	11	Ret	9	7	9	Ret	11	Ret	14	16	11	Ret	Ret	29
7	Valvoline Team Mondeo	Ret	DNS	12	12	Ret	Ret	Ret	13	Ret	Ret	Ret	10	Ret	16	Ret	12	12	12	Ret	12	Ret	Ret	17	17	DNS	DNS	29
8	Total Team Peugeot	11	9	8	9	Ret	10	12	Ret	11	8	4	12	Ret	9	Ret	13	Ret	Ret	Ret	Ret	Ret	12	10	14	10	9	26
8	Total Team Peugeot	Ret	Ret	Ret	10	Ret	Ret	13	Ret	Ret	11	Ret	Ret	Ret	15	Ret	Ret	Ret	DNS	Ret	DNS	Ret	Ret	Ret	Ret	13	11	26
9	Mint Motorsport	15	14	14	14	DNS	NC	14	10	9	Ret	8	11	12	DSQ	12	14	11	15	11	13	DNS	15	13	16	DNS	DNS	6
10	Rouse Sport	14	11	11	13	9	11	15	12	12	10	10	14	14	10	13	15	Ret	DNS			11	13	11	Ret	11	12	5
10	Rouse Sport	Ret	12	13	DNS	DNS	DNS	16	Ret	15	12	11	Ret	Ret	Ret	Ret	Ret									DNS	Ret	5
11	Brookes Motorsport	13	15	15	Ret	10	12	18	11	14	14	12	13	14	17	14	16	13	14	12	15	9	16	15	15	14	14	3
12	Team Dynamics	12	Ret	Ret	15	11	14	17	Ret	16	15	Ret	DNS			Ret	17	14	13	13	14	10	18	14	Ret	12	13	1
12	Team Dynamics			Ret	16	13	Ret	19	Ret							Ret	18	15	16									1
13	ProMotor Sport			DNS	DNS															DNS	DNS	12	Ret	18	18			0
Pos	Team	DON		BRH		THR		SIL		OUL		SNE		BRH		SIL		KNO		OUL		THR		DON		BRH		Pts

== Bibliography ==
- Fearnley, Paul (1 December 1996). Fearnley, Paul (ed.). Autocourse British Motorsport Year 1996-97. Richmond, UK: Hazleton Publishing. p. 176. ISBN 978-1-874557-12-8.
