= Tony Crudgington =

British racing driver (born 1948)

- Nationality: (United Kingdom) British
- Born: September 1948 (age 78) Romford, Essex, England

British Saloon / Touring Car Championship
- Years active: 1982–1983, 1985–1989
- Teams: Tony Crudgington; RZ Racing
- Starts: 46
- Wins: 0 (2 in class)
- Poles: 0
- Fastest laps: 4
- Best finish: 6th in 1988

Stuart Anthony Crudgington (born September 1948) is a British auto racing driver. He regularly competed in the British Touring Car Championship during the nineteen-eighties with cars from the Toyota marque. His most successful season came in 1988, finishing second in Class D and sixth overall. His final season in the BTCC was in 1989, finishing eighth overall and again runner-up in class D to Phil Dowsett.

Crudgington retired from motorsport at the end of the 2017 season after competing in a self-built Triumph Dolomite Sprint, in historic events in the UK.

== Racing record ==
=== Complete British Saloon / Touring Car Championship results ===
(key) (Races in bold indicate pole position) (Races in italics indicate fastest lap – 1 point awarded ?–1989 in class)

Year	Team	Car	Class	1	2	3	4	5	6	7	8	9	10	11	12	13	DC	Pts	Class
1982	Tony Crudgington	Toyota Corolla GT	B	SIL	MAL	OUL	THR	THR	SIL	DON	BRH	DON ovr:15 cls:4	BRH ovr:19 cls:7	SIL ovr:? cls:5			31st	5	9th
1983	RZ Racing	Toyota Corolla GT	C	SIL	OUL	THR	BRH	THR; Ret	SIL	DON							NC	0	NC
1983	Tony Crudgington	Ford Fiesta XR2	C								SIL; Ret	DON	BRH	SIL			NC	0	NC
1985	Tony Crudgington	Toyota Corolla GT	C	SIL; DNS	OUL	THR	DON	THR	SIL ovr:16 cls:4	DON ovr:18 cls:4	SIL ovr:16 cls:3	SNE ovr:12 cls:3	BRH ovr:14 cls:7	BRH; Ret	SIL; Ret		17th	15	6th
1986	Tony Crudgington	Toyota Corolla GT	C	SIL ovr:10 cls:2	THR; DNS	SIL ovr:9 cls:3	DON ovr:7 cls:3	BRH; Ret	SNE; DNS	BRH ovr:17 cls:3	DON; Ret	SIL ovr:10 cls:3					10th	23	**3rd**
1987	Tony Crudgington	Toyota Corolla GT	D	SIL; DNS	OUL	THR	THR ovr:12 cls:3	SIL ovr:13 cls:4	SIL ovr:21 cls:6	BRH	SNE	DON	OUL	DON	SIL; Ret		24th	9	5th
1988	Tony Crudgington	Toyota Corolla GT	D	SIL ovr:11 cls:2	OUL	THR ovr:14 cls:1	DON ovr:20 cls:4	THR ovr:19 cls:2	SIL ovr:19 cls:2	SIL; Ret	BRH; Ret	SNE ovr:17 cls:2	BRH ovr:18 cls:2	BIR; C	DON; Ret	SIL ovr:17 cls:4	6th	35	**2nd**
1989	Tony Crudgington	Toyota Corolla GT	D	OUL	SIL; Ret	THR ovr:20 cls:2	DON ovr:15 cls:2	THR ovr:20 cls:1	SIL ovr:24 cls:3	SIL ovr:29 cls:5	BRH; Ret	SNE ovr:22 cls:3	BRH; Ret	BIR; Ret	DON ovr:24 cls:4	SIL ovr:25 cls:2	9th	37	**2nd**
