= David Brodie (racing driver) =

British racing driver (1943–2024)

- Nationality: (United Kingdom) British
- Born: 15 May 1943 Amersham, Buckinghamshire, England
- Died: 17 December 2024 (aged 81)

British Saloon / Touring Car Championship
- Years active: 1971–1973, 1976–1981, 1983–1991
- Teams: David Brodie; Norman Reeves Ltd; Mazda Dealer Team; Hughes of Beaconsfield; Colt Car Company; BBW Motorsport; Brodie Brittain Racing; Listerine Racing Team
- Starts: 82
- Wins: 2 (5 in class)
- Poles: 9
- Fastest laps: 8
- Best finish: 4th in 1985

David Alexander Brodie (15 May 1943 – 17 December 2024) was a British motor racing driver. He is best known for his time competing in the British Touring Car Championship. His best season in the BTCC was in 1985, finishing fourth overall on points.

== Career ==
Brodie started motor racing in 1963 winning his first race at Silverstone in an Austin A35. Since then, he has completed in over 700 races and driven saloons, sports cars, and Formula Three single seaters. Brodie was seriously injured in a crash during the British Saloon Car Championship support race for the 1973 British Grand Prix at Silverstone.

Brodie is credited with being the seventh most successful driver ever at Brands Hatch and has held lap records on all UK circuits. The record he set at Thruxton in 1989 for saloons remained unbroken until 1995.

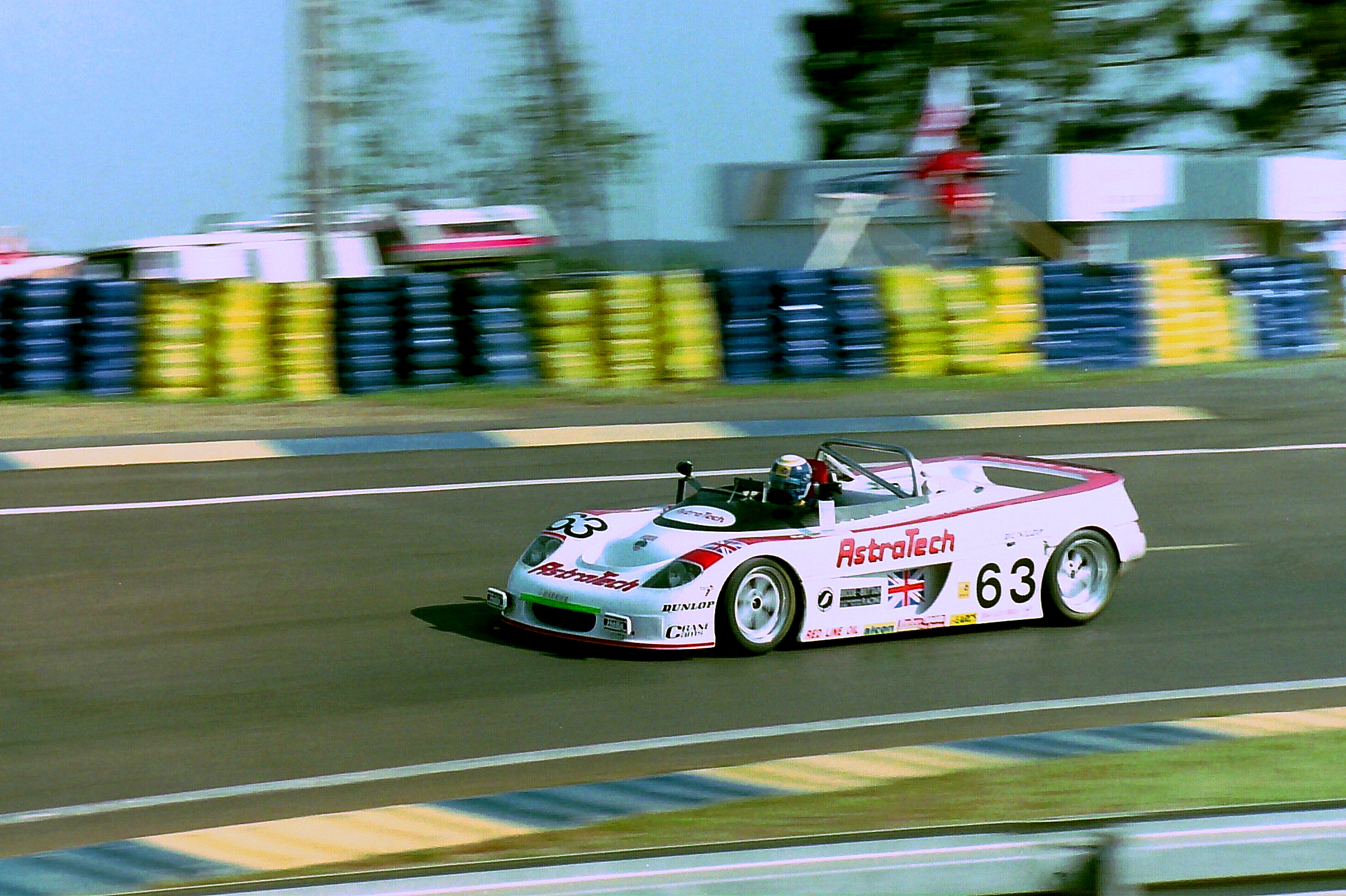
Rob Wilson, David Brodie and William Hewland’s team at the 1994 Le Mans.

Having raced at virtually all the European circuits, Brodie also competed in a number of 500km and 24-hour races. The last of these was Le Mans in 1994 when he qualified as fastest team driver and then led LM2 until the car was withdrawn in the early hours of Sunday morning.

Interesting fuel consumption statistics from this event showed that during 1.5 hour driving stints, Brodie used 13 litres less than one driver and 8 litres less than the other.

In later years, Brodie raced successfully in the Volkswagen Vento VR6 Challenge series, winning races and establishing new lap records.

Brodie was an active director of the BRDC and was a director of the Springfield boys club with Jackie Stewart, a post he held for 27 years. He was also a director of BBR GTi, a company Brodie developed following a successful racing career beginning in the 1970s.

== Personal life and death ==
Brodie had two sons from his first marriage to Kathy Brodie, and was later married to Peggy Brodie for 40 years.

Brodie died on 17 December 2024, at the age of 81.

== Racing record ==
=== Complete British Saloon / Touring Car Championship results ===
(key) (Races in bold indicate pole position – 1973–1990 in class) (Races in italics indicate fastest lap – 1 point awarded ?–1989 in class)

Year	Team	Car	Class	1	2	3	4	5	6	7	8	9	10	11	12	13	14	15	DC	Pts	Class
1971	David Brodie	Ford Escort RS1600	C	BRH	SNE	THR	SIL	CRY	SIL	CRO	SIL ovr:16 cls:8	OUL	BRH	MAL	BRH				NC	0	NC
1972	Norman Reeves / Stirling Cooper	Ford Escort RS1600	C	BRH; Ret	OUL ovr:7 cls:3	THR; Ret	SIL ovr:5 cls:2	CRY ovr:6† cls:3†	BRH ovr:2 cls:1	OUL; DNS	SIL; Ret	MAL; DNS	BRH ovr:4 cls:2						8th	29	**2nd**
1973	Norman Reeves Ltd	Ford Escort RS1600	C	BRH ovr:2 cls:1	SIL ovr:4 cls:2	THR ovr:3 cls:1	THR ovr:4 cls:1	SIL; Ret	ING	BRH	SIL	BRH							9th	33	**2nd**
1976	Mazda Dealer Team	Mazda Savannah RX-3	C	BRH ovr:6 cls:3	SIL ovr:21 cls:5	OUL	THR; Ret	THR ovr:? cls:3	SIL ovr:3 cls:1	BRH; Ret	MAL ovr:8† cls:3†	SNE ovr:11† cls:?†	BRH ovr:4 cls:3						9th	29	4th
1977	David Brodie	Ford Capri II 3.0S	D	SIL	BRH	OUL	THR	SIL	THR	DON	SIL; Ret	DON	BRH	THR	BRH ovr:? cls:?				NC	0	NC
1978	David Brodie	Ford Capri II 3.0S	D	SIL	OUL	THR	BRH; Ret†	**SIL**; Ret†	DON	MAL	**BRH**; Ret	DON	BRH ovr:4 cls:4	THR; DNS	OUL ovr:6† cls:6†				33rd	5	10th
1979	David Brodie	Ford Capri II 3.0S	D	SIL	OUL	THR	SIL	DON	SIL	MAL	DON	BRH ovr:5 cls:5	THR	SNE	OUL ovr:3† cls:3†				29th	6	9th
1980	David Brodie	Ford Capri III 3.0S	D	MAL	OUL	THR	SIL	SIL	BRH; Ret	MAL	BRH ovr:9 cls:7	THR	SIL ovr:5 cls:5						37th	2	11th
1981	Hughes of Beaconsfield	Toyota Corolla GT	B	MAL	SIL	OUL	THR	BRH	SIL	SIL	DON	BRH	THR ovr:? cls:?	SIL; Ret					NC	0	NC
1983	Team Colt Cars Mid-West	Mitsubishi Starion Turbo	A	SIL	OUL	THR	BRH	THR	SIL; Ret	DON ovr:16 cls:7	SIL ovr:16 cls:10	DON; Ret	BRH; Ret	SIL ovr:3 cls:3					24th	4	7th
1984	Colt Cars Dealer Racing Team	Mitsubishi Starion Turbo	A	DON; Ret	SIL	OUL; DNS	THR ovr:9 cls:7	THR; Ret	SIL ovr:7 cls:7	SNE ovr:16 cls:7	BRH ovr:3 cls:3	BRH ovr:3 cls:3	DON ovr:4 cls:4	SIL; DSQ					17th	11	5th
1985	Mitsubishi Colt Racing	Mitsubishi Starion Turbo	A	SIL	OUL ovr:13 cls:4	**THR** ovr:1 cls:1	**DON** ovr:2 cls:2	THR ovr:3 cls:3	**SIL**; Ret	DON ovr:2 cls:2	**SIL** ovr:2 cls:2	**SNE**; Ret	**BRH** ovr:3 cls:3	**BRH** ovr:3 cls:3	SIL ovr:2 cls:2				4th	54	**2nd**
1986	BBW Motorsport	Mitsubishi Starion Turbo	A	SIL	THR	SIL	DON	BRH; Ret	SNE	BRH	DON	SIL ovr:1 cls:1							15th	10	5th
1987	BBW Turbosport	Mitsubishi Starion Turbo	A	SIL	OUL	THR	THR	SIL	SIL ovr:2 cls:2	BRH	SNE	DON	OUL	DON	SIL				26th	6	12th
1988	Brodie Brittain Racing	Ford Sierra RS500	A	SIL	OUL	THR	DON	THR	SIL	SIL	BRH	SNE	BRH	BIR	DON; DNS	SIL ovr:6 cls:6			54th	1	21st
1989	Brodie Brittain Racing	Ford Sierra RS500	A	OUL	SIL ovr:5 cls:5	THR; DSQ	DON ovr:10 cls:6	THR; DSQ	SIL ovr:8 cls:8	SIL	BRH; DNS	SNE ovr:8 cls:8	BRH ovr:11 cls:8	BIR	DON; NC	SIL; Ret			NC	-37	NC
1990	Listerine Racing Team	Ford Sierra RS500	A	OUL	DON	THR	SIL	OUL	SIL	BRH; Ret‡									28th	8	11th
1990	Brodie Brittain Racing	Ford Sierra RS500	A								SNE; DNS	BRH	BIR	DON; Ret	THR ovr:9 cls:5	SIL			28th	8	11th
1991	Brodie Brittain Racing	Ford Sierra Sapphire 4x4		SIL	SNE	DON	THR	SIL	BRH	SIL	DON; 1	DON; 2	OUL	BRH; 1 Ret	BRH; 2 DNS	DON; DNS	THR; Ret	SIL; 15	NC	0	

† Events with 2 races staged for the different classes.

‡ Endurance driver.

=== Complete European Touring Car Championship results ===
(key) (Races in bold indicate pole position) (Races in italics indicate fastest lap)

Year	Team	Car	1	2	3	4	5	6	7	8	9	10	11	12	13	14	DC	Points
1971	(United Kingdom) **David Wood Engineering**	Ford Escort RS1600	MNZ	SAL	BRN	NUR	SPA	ZAN	LEC; Ret	JAR							NC	0
1972	(United Kingdom) **Sony Racing Team**	Ford Escort RS1600	MNZ	SAL	BRN	NUR	SPA; Ret										NC	0
1972	(United Kingdom) **Fabergé Racing**	Ford Escort RS1600						ZAN ovr:11* cls:1*									NC	0
1972	(United Kingdom) **Norman Reeves / Stirling Cooper**	Ford Escort RS1600								SIL; Ret	JAR						NC	0
1972	(United Kingdom) **VMW Motors**	Ford Escort 1300 GT							LEC; Ret								NC	0
1973	(United Kingdom) **Norman Reeves Ltd**	Ford Escort RS1600	MNZ; Ret	SAL	MAN; Ret	NUR	SPA	ZAN	LEC	SIL							NC	0
1976	(United Kingdom) **Mazda Dealer Team**	Mazda Savannah RX-3	MNZ	SAL	MUG	BRN	NUR	SPA	VAL	SIL ovr:10* cls:4*	JAR						NC	0
1978	(United Kingdom) **David Brodie**	Ford Capri II 3.0S	BRA	MNZ	MUG	SAL	JAR	EST	ZEL	BRN	NUR	ZAN	SIL ovr:10* cls:6*	ZOL			NC	0
1979	(United Kingdom) **David Brodie**	Ford Capri II 3.0S	MNZ	VAL	MUG	BRA	JAR	ZEL	BRN	NUR	ZAN	SAL	PER	SIL; Ret	ZOL		NC	0
1980	(United Kingdom) **Patrick MotorSport**	Rover 3500 SD1	MNZ	VAL	BRA	SAL	BRN	PER	NUR	SIL ovr:10* cls:2*	ZOL						NC	0
1985	(United Kingdom) **Mitsubishi Colt Racing**	Mitsubishi Starion Turbo	MNZ	VAL	DON	AND	BRN	ZEL	SAL	NUR	SPA	**SIL** ovr:5* cls:5*	NOG	ZOL	EST	JAR	NC	0
1986	(United Kingdom) **BBW Turbosport**	Mitsubishi Starion Turbo	MNZ	DON	HOC	MIS	AND	BRN	ZEL	NUR	SPA	SIL; Ret	NOG	ZOL	EST	JAR	NC	0

- Ineligible to score points.

=== Complete World Sportscar Championship results ===
(key) (Races in bold indicate pole position) (Races in italics indicate fastest lap)

Year	Entrant	Class	Car	Engine	1	2	3	4	5	6	7	8	9	Pos.	Pts
1978	(United Kingdom) **David Brodie**	Div. 2	Ford Capri II 3.0S	Ford Essex 3.0 V6	DAY	MUG	DIJ	SIL; 13	NUR	MIS	WGL	VAL		NC	0
1986	(United Kingdom) **P.C. Automotive with Texas Homecare**	C2	Royale RP40	Mitsubishi Turbo 2.0 Turbo I4	MNZ	SIL; DNQ	LMS	NOR	BRH	JER	NÜR	SPA	FUJ	NC	0

=== Complete British GT Championship results ===
(key) (Races in bold indicate pole position) (Races in italics indicate fastest lap)

Year	Team	Car	Class	1	2	3	4	5	6	7	8	9	Pos	Points
1997	Orion Motorsport	Harrier LR9C	GT2	SIL	BRA	DON	OUL	SIL	DON	BRA; Ret	CRO	SIL	NC	0

=== Complete 24 Hours of Le Mans results ===
Year	Team	Co-Drivers	Car	Class	Laps	Pos.	Class Pos.
1994	(United Kingdom) Chamberlain Engineering	(New Zealand) Rob Wilson (United Kingdom) William Hewland	Harrier LR9C	GT2	45	DNF	DNF
