= Alan Minshaw =

British racing driver (1935–2024)

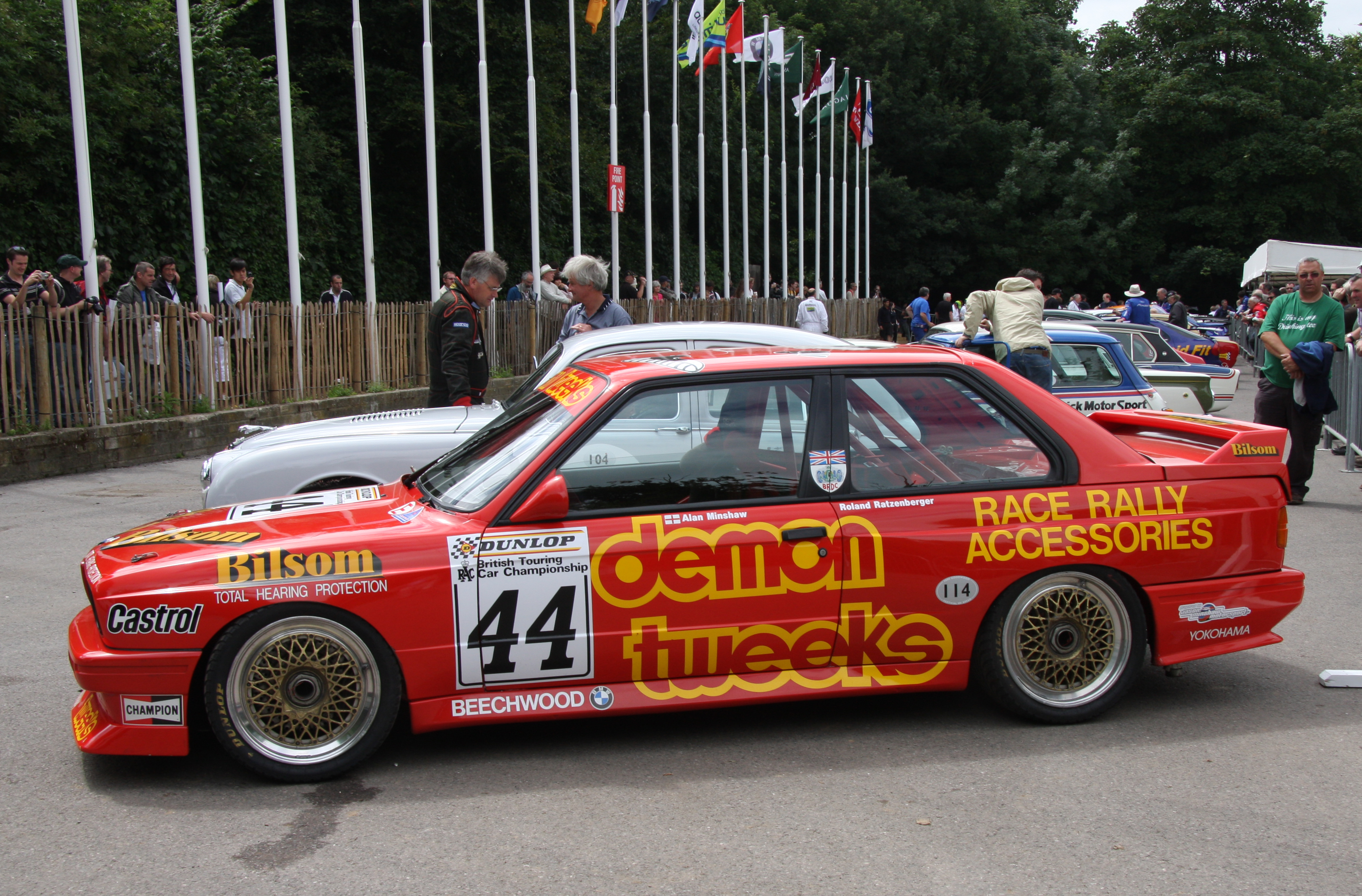
- Minshaw's 1988 British Touring Car Championship BMW M3
- Nationality: (United Kingdom) British
- Born: 17 May 1935 Liverpool, Lancashire, England
- Died: 16 April 2024 (aged 88)

British Saloon / Touring Car Championship
- Years active: 1979, 1981, 1983–1989
- Teams: Demon Tweeks Racing
- Starts: 51
- Wins: 0 (3 in class)
- Poles: 0
- Fastest laps: 5
- Best finish: 2nd in 1983

Championship titles
- 1983: British Saloon Car Championship - Class C

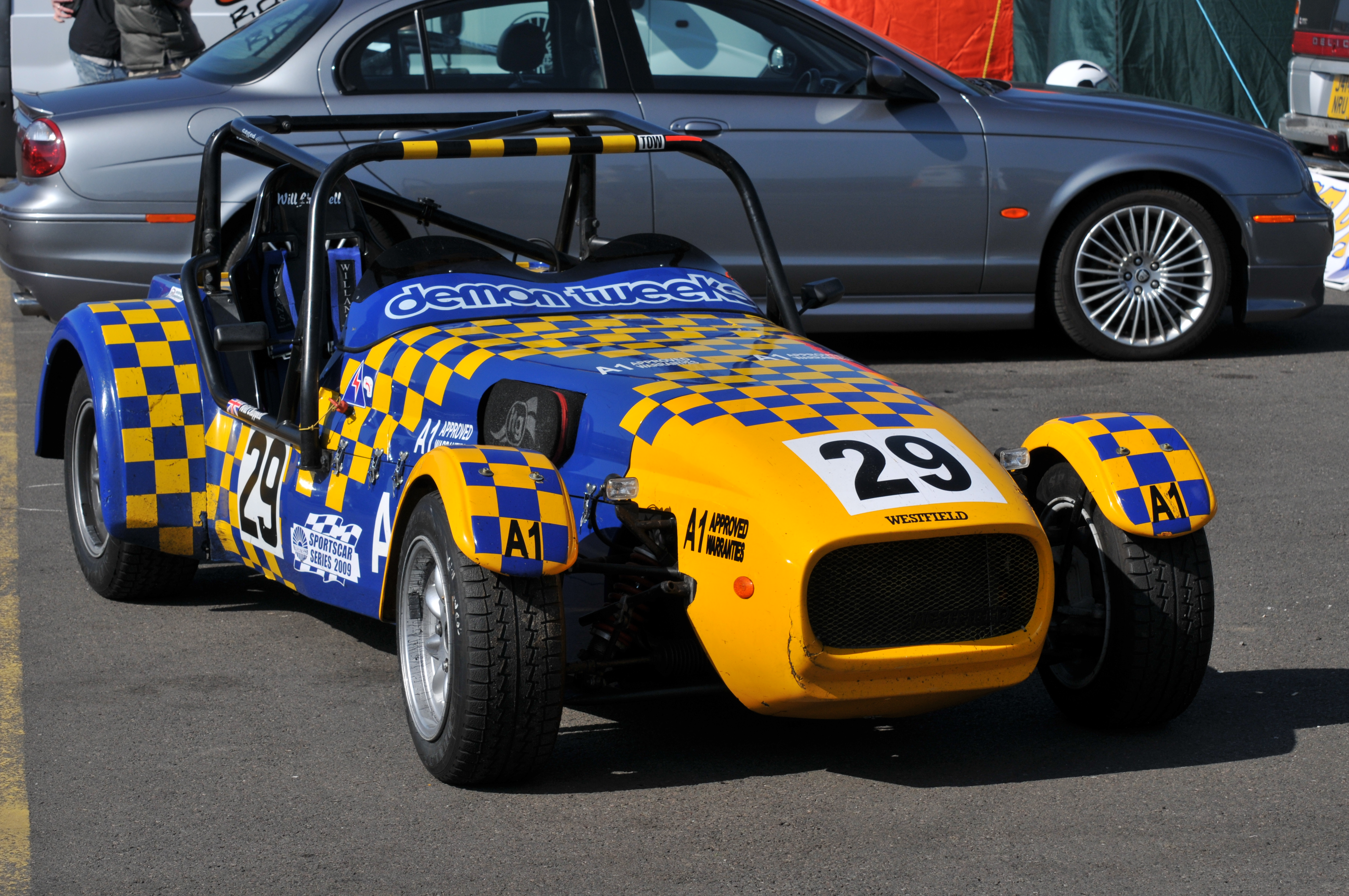
Demon Tweeks Westfield in 2009

Alan Richard Minshaw (17 May 1935 – 16 April 2024) was a British racing driver. In 1983 he won Class C and finished second overall in the British Saloon Car Championship in a Volkswagen Golf GTi.

As of 2012, Minshaw owned a varied collection of historic racing vehicles, and regularly competed alongside his sons.

Minshaw died on 16 April 2024, at the age of 88.

== Racing record ==
=== Complete British Saloon / Touring Car Championship results ===
(key) (Races in bold indicate pole position) (Races in italics indicate fastest lap – 1 point awarded ?–1989 in class)

| Year | Team | Car | Class | 1 | 2 | 3 | 4 | 5 | 6 | 7 | 8 | 9 | 10 | 11 | 12 | 13 | DC | Pts | Class |
|---|---|---|---|---|---|---|---|---|---|---|---|---|---|---|---|---|---|---|---|
| 1979 | Demon Tweeks Racing | Volkswagen Scirocco GTI | B | SIL ? | OUL; Ret† | THR; 26 | SIL; Ret | DON | SIL | MAL; Ret† | DON | BRH | THR | SNE | OUL ?† | | 32nd | 4 | 7th |
| 1981 | Demon Tweeks Racing | Volkswagen Golf GTI | B | MAL | SIL; 21 | OUL | THR | BRH; 14† | SIL ? | SIL; 20 | DON; DNS | BRH | THR ? | SIL | | | 28th | 5 | 9th |
| 1983 | Demon Tweeks Racing | Volkswagen Golf GTI | C | SIL; 11 | OUL; 12 | THR; 11 | BRH; 10 | THR; 11 | SIL; 9 | DON; 12 | SIL; 12 | DON; 8 | BRH; 14 | SIL; Ret | | | **2nd** | **45** | **1st** |
| 1984 | Demon Tweeks Racing | Volkswagen Golf GTI | B | DON | SIL | OUL | THR | THR | SIL | SNE | BRH | BRH | DON; Ret | SIL; 16 | | | 27th | 2 | 11th |
| 1985 | Demon Tweeks Racing | Volkswagen Golf GTI | B | SIL | OUL | THR | DON | THR | SIL | DON | SIL; 12 | SNE | BRH | BRH | SIL | | 33rd | 1 | 10th |
| 1986 | Demon Tweeks Racing | Toyota Corolla GT | C | SIL | THR | SIL | DON | BRH; 13 | SNE; 10 | BRH | DON | SIL | | | | | 15th | 10 | 5th |
| 1987 | Demon Tweeks Racing | Toyota Corolla GT | D | SIL; 10‡ | OUL; WD | THR | THR | SIL | | | | | | | | | 19th | 14 | NC |
| 1987 | Demon Tweeks Racing | Volkswagen Golf GTI | C | | | | | | SIL; 22 | BRH; 12 | SNE | DON; Ret | OUL; 10 | DON; Ret | SIL | | 19th | 14 | **3rd** |
| 1988 | Demon Tweeks | BMW M3 | B | SIL; 7 | OUL; 7 | THR; 8 | DON; Ret | THR | SIL | SIL | BRH; 21 | SNE | BRH | BIR | | | 14th | 23 | 7th |
| 1988 | Demon Tweeks | Volkswagen Golf GTI | C | | | | | | | | | | | | DON; Ret | SIL; 13 | 14th | 23 | 4th |
| 1989 | Demon Tweeks | Volkswagen Golf GTI | C | OUL; Ret | SIL; 22 | THR; 24 | DON; 16 | THR; Ret | SIL; 22 | SIL; 24 | BRH; 18 | SNE; 20 | BRH; Ret | | | | 19th | 24 | 5th |
| 1989 | Demon Tweeks | BMW M3 | B | | | | | | | | | | | BIR; DNQ | DON; 16 | SIL | 19th | 24 | 13th |

† Events with 2 races staged for the different classes.

‡ Guest driver - not eligible for points.

=== Complete World Touring Car Championship results ===
(key) (Races in bold indicate pole position) (Races in italics indicate fastest lap)

| Year | Team | Car | 1 | 2 | 3 | 4 | 5 | 6 | 7 | 8 | 9 | 10 | 11 | DC | Pts |
|---|---|---|---|---|---|---|---|---|---|---|---|---|---|---|---|
| 1987 | (United Kingdom) **Demon Tweeks** | Volkswagen Golf GTI | MNZ | JAR | DIJ | NÜR | SPA | BNO | SIL; DNQ | BAT | CLD | WEL | FJI | NC | 0 |
