= Phil Dowsett =

British racing driver (born 1951)

- Nationality: (United Kingdom) British
- Born: 4 March 1951 (age 75) Chelmsford, Essex, England

British Saloon / Touring Car Championship
- Years active: 1977, 1984–1985, 1987–1989
- Teams: Stuart Patterson; Terry Drury Racing; North Essex Motorsport; TOM's GB; Rayscar
- Starts: 49
- Wins: 0 (17 in class)
- Poles: 0
- Fastest laps: 0 (18 in class)
- Best finish: 2nd in 1988

Championship titles
- 1988, 1989: British Touring Car Championship - Class D

Philip Colin Dowsett (born 4 March 1951) is a British retired racing driver. He initially competed in Formula Ford, Formula Three and Formula Atlantic in the 1970s, finishing as runner-up in the 1979 and 1980 National Formula Atlantic Championships. He competed regularly in the British Touring Car Championship during the 1980s in a Toyota Corolla GT. In 1988 and 1989, he won consecutive class D (up to 1600cc) titles, becoming the last driver to win that class. He finished as runner-up in the championship overall in 1988, five points behind champion Frank Sytner. He is the father of racing cyclist Alex Dowsett.

== Racing record ==
=== Complete British Saloon / Touring Car Championship results ===
(key) (Races in bold indicate pole position) (Races in italics indicate fastest lap – 1 point awarded ?–1989 in class)

Year	Team	Car	Class	1	2	3	4	5	6	7	8	9	10	11	12	13	DC	Pts	Class
1977	Stuart Patterson	Ford Capri II 3.0s	D	SIL	BRH	OUL	THR	SIL	THR	DON	SIL; 9	DON ?†	BRH; 8	THR	BRH		31st	1	10th
1984	Terry Drury Racing	Alfa Romeo Alfetta GTV6	B	DON; Ret	SIL; Ret	OUL; 14	THR; 10	THR; 9	SIL; Ret	SNE; 8	BRH; 6	BRH; 9	DON; 10	SIL; 8			4th	48	**2nd**
1985	Terry Drury Racing	Alfa Romeo Alfetta GTV6	B	SIL; Ret	OUL; 4	THR; Ret	DON; 8	THR; Ret	SIL; 10	DON; 12	SIL; 9	SNE; 7	BRH	BRH	SIL		13th	21	5th
1987	North Essex Motorsport	Ford Escort RS1600i	D	SIL	OUL	THR	THR; 14	SIL; 11	SIL; 19	BRH	SNE	DON; 15			SIL; 14		16th	19	**3rd**
1987	Terry Drury Racing	Ford Escort RS Turbo	B										OUL; DNS	DON			16th	19	NC
1988	TOM's GB	Toyota Corolla FX-GT	D	SIL; 10	OUL; 10	THR; 18	DON; 15	THR; 17	SIL; 17	SIL; 18	BRH; 17	SNE; 14	BRH; 17	BIR; C	DON; 20	SIL; 12	**2nd**	**98**	**1st**
1989	Phil Dowsett	Toyota Corolla FX-GT	D	OUL; Ret	SIL; 21	THR; 17	DON; 13	THR; Ret	SIL; 20	SIL; 26	BRH	SNE					7th	56	**1st**
1989	Rayscar	Toyota Corolla FX-GT	D										BRH; 16	BIR; Ret	DON	SIL	7th	56	**1st**

† Events with 2 races staged for the different classes.
