= 1987 British Touring Car Championship =

30th season of the British Touring Car Championship

Seasons
- ← 1986 1988 →

The 1987 Dunlop RAC British Touring Car Championship was the 30th season of the championship. The series, previously the British Saloon Car Championship, had a new name and new sponsor. Chris Hodgetts successfully defended his drivers title with his class D Toyota Corolla.

== Teams & Drivers ==
Team	Car	No.	Drivers	Rounds	Endurance drivers
Class A
ICS plc	Ford Sierra RS Cosworth	1	(United Kingdom) Andy Rouse	1, 4–5, 7	
ICS plc	Ford Sierra RS500	1	(United Kingdom) Andy Rouse	11	
ICS plc	Ford Sierra RS Cosworth	1	(United Kingdom) Win Percy	6	
ICS plc	Ford Sierra RS Cosworth	2	(United Kingdom) Pete Hall	1–9	(United Kingdom) Andy Rouse
ICS plc	Ford Sierra RS500	2	(United Kingdom) Pete Hall	10–12	(United Kingdom) Andy Rouse
Graham Scarborough	Rover Vitesse	3	(United Kingdom) Graham Scarborough	All	(United Kingdom) Lionel Abbott^{†}
Dennis Leech	Rover Vitesse	4	(United Kingdom) Dennis Leech	1, 3–12	(United Kingdom) Karl Jones^{†}
R.A. Potter	Rover Vitesse	5	(United Kingdom) David Carvell	All	(United Kingdom) Jeff Allam
Listerine Racing Team	Ford Sierra RS Cosworth	6	(United Kingdom) Graham Goode	1–8	(United Kingdom) Win Percy
Listerine Racing Team	Ford Sierra RS500	6	(United Kingdom) Graham Goode	9–10	(United Kingdom) Win Percy
Alan Docking Racing	Holden Commodore VK SS Group A	7	(United Kingdom) Mike O'Brien	2–8, 10–12	(Australia) Gary Brabham
John Maguire Racing	Rover Vitesse	8	(United Kingdom) Tim Harvey	All	(United Kingdom) David Leslie
BBW Turbosport	Mitsubishi Starion Turbo	9	(United Kingdom) Dave Brodie	6	
BBW Turbosport	Mitsubishi Starion Turbo	9	(United Kingdom) Chris Aylett	12	
Newman's Footwear	BMW 635CSi	10	(United Kingdom) Mike Newman	2–6, 8–11	(United Kingdom) Rob Speak^{†}
Griffin Motorsport	Rover Vitesse	11	(United Kingdom) Bill Griffin	4–5	
Tom Walkinshaw Racing	Rover Vitesse	12	(United Kingdom) Jeff Allam	6 (Did Not Race)	
Brian Chatfield	Rover Vitesse	14	(United Kingdom) Brian Chatfield	6–8	
Abbott Racing	Ford Sierra RS Cosworth	15	(United Kingdom) Mike Smith	6	
Graham Hathaway Racing	Ford Sierra RS Cosworth	16	(United Kingdom) Robb Gravett	6	
Tom Walkinshaw Racing	Holden Commodore	17	(United Kingdom) Tom Walkinshaw	6 (Did Not Race)	
API Motorsport	Ford Sierra RS Cosworth	17	(Australia) Rex Muldoon	12	
Roger Dowson Engineering	Ford Sierra RS Cosworth	18	(United Kingdom) Jerry Mahony	6–7	
TCCS Racing	Ford Sierra RS Cosworth	19	(United Kingdom) Dave Morgan	6	
Unknown	Mitsubishi Starion	?	(United Kingdom) Graham Rose	1	
Class B
Asquith Autosport	Ford Escort RS Turbo	22	(United Kingdom) Karl Jones	6–7, 11–12	
Alfa Romeo Dealer Team	Alfa Romeo 75 Turbo	30	(United Kingdom) Rob Kirby	2–5	
Alfa Romeo Dealer Team	Alfa Romeo 75	30	(United Kingdom) Rob Kirby	6–7	
Alfa Romeo Dealer Team	Alfa Romeo 75 Turbo	31	(United Kingdom) Jon Dooley	All	(United Kingdom) Rob Kirby
Kevin Eaton	Nissan Bluebird Turbo	32	(United Kingdom) Kevin Eaton	1, 6, 9, 11–12	
Prodrive	BMW M3	33	(United Kingdom) Frank Sytner	6–7, 9–11	(United Kingdom) Mike Smith
Terry Drury Racing	Ford Escort RS Turbo	38	(United Kingdom) Mark Hales^{1}	1–11	(United Kingdom) Phil Dowsett^{1}
Terry Drury Racing	Ford Escort RS Turbo	38	(United Kingdom) Graham Hathaway^{†}	12	(United Kingdom) Phil Dowsett^{1}
Terry Drury Racing	Ford Escort RS Turbo	39	(United Kingdom) Lionel Wiffen	8–12	(United Kingdom) Graham Hathaway^{1} (United Kingdom) Mark Hales
Class C
Demon Tweeks	Volkswagen Golf GTI	42	(United Kingdom) Alan Minshaw	6–7, 9–11	(United Kingdom) Vic Lee^{†}
Unknown	Renault 5 GT Turbo	44	(United Kingdom) David Grimshaw	3, 6	
Roger Saunders	Renault 5 GT Turbo	45	(United Kingdom) Roger Saunders	All	(United Kingdom) Holman 'Les' Blackburn^{†}
Unknown	Renault 5 GT Turbo	46	(United Kingdom) Anthony Pownall	6	
Unknown	Renault 5 GT Turbo	47	(United Kingdom) Niki Phillips	6	
Paul Harmer	Vauxhall Astra GTE	48	(United Kingdom) Paul Harmer	6–7	
Unknown	Renault 5 GT Turbo	54	(United Kingdom) Les Germain	6–7	
Colin Pearcy	MG Metro Turbo	55	(United Kingdom) Colin Pearcy	1, 6–12	(United Kingdom) Paul Taft
Alex Postan	Renault 5 GT Turbo	58	(United Kingdom) Alex Postan	6	
Unknown	Renault 5 GT Turbo	?	(United Kingdom) David Gibson	4	
Unknown	Renault 5 GT Turbo	?	(United Kingdom) David Martell	4	
Unknown	Renault 5 GT Turbo	?	(United Kingdom) Peter Gottlieb	7	
Unknown	Renault 5 GT Turbo	?	(United Kingdom) David Kay	11	
Class D
Tony Crudgington	Toyota Corolla GT	63	(United Kingdom) Tony Crudgington	1, 4–6, 12	
Formula Services	Toyota Corolla	64	(United Kingdom) James Kaye	6 (Did Not Race)	
Chris Hodgetts Motor Sport	Toyota Corolla GT	66	(United Kingdom) Chris Hodgetts	1–11	(United Kingdom) Tiff Needell^{†}
Chris Hodgetts Motor Sport	Toyota Corolla GT	66	(United Kingdom) Mark Hales^{†}	12	(United Kingdom) Tiff Needell^{†}
Chris Hodgetts Motor Sport	Toyota Corolla GT	67	(United Kingdom) Alan Minshaw^{†2}	1–2	(United Kingdom) Chris Hodgetts^{†}
Chris Hodgetts Motor Sport	Toyota Corolla GT	67	(United Kingdom) Chuck Nicholson^{†}	2	(United Kingdom) Chris Hodgetts^{†}
Chris Hodgetts Motor Sport	Toyota Corolla GT	67	(United Kingdom) Will Hoy^{†}	6	(United Kingdom) Chris Hodgetts^{†}
Chris Hodgetts Motor Sport	Toyota Corolla GT	67	(United Kingdom) Tiff Needell	10	(United Kingdom) Chris Hodgetts^{†}
Chris Hodgetts Motor Sport	Toyota Corolla GT	69	(United Kingdom) Paul Longfield^{†}	1, 3	
Chris Hodgetts Motor Sport	Toyota Corolla GT	69	(United Kingdom) Alex Moss^{†}	2, 7	
Chris Hodgetts Motor Sport	Toyota Corolla GT	69	(United Kingdom) Tony Dron^{†}	9	
TOM's GB	Toyota Corolla FX GT	70	(United Kingdom) Tiff Needell	6, 11–12	
North Essex Motorsport	Ford Escort RS1600i	74	(United Kingdom) Phil Dowsett	4–6, 9, 12	
North Essex Motorsport	Ford Escort RS1600i	74	(United Kingdom) Patrick Watts^{†}	8	
North Essex Motorsport	Ford Escort RS1600i	74	(United Kingdom) Keith Norman^{†}	11	
AGK Motorsport	Toyota Corolla GT	77	(United Kingdom) Geoff Kimber-Smith	1, 3–12	(United Kingdom) Gerry Marshall^{†}
Alan Gaunt	Ford Escort RS1600i	?	(United Kingdom) Richard Belcher^{†}	11	
Alan Gaunt	Ford Escort RS1600i	?	(United Kingdom) Mark Goddard^{†}	12	

^{†}Not eligible for points.
^{1}Practice only at round 10.
^{2}Practice & qualifying only at round 2.

== Calendar and results ==
All races were held in the United Kingdom. Overall winners in **bold**.

Round	Circuit	Date	Pole position	Fastest lap	Class A winner	Class B winner	Class C Winner	Class D Winner
1	Silverstone Circuit, Northamptonshire	12 April	(United Kingdom) Andy Rouse	(United Kingdom) Andy Rouse	(United Kingdom) **Andy Rouse**	(United Kingdom) Mark Hales	(United Kingdom) Colin Pearcy	(United Kingdom) Chris Hodgetts
2	Oulton Park, Cheshire	17 April	(United Kingdom) Mike O'Brien	(United Kingdom) Tim Harvey	(United Kingdom) **Tim Harvey**	(United Kingdom) Mark Hales	(United Kingdom) Roger Saunders	(United Kingdom) Chris Hodgetts
3	Thruxton Circuit, Hampshire	20 April	(United Kingdom) Dennis Leech	(United Kingdom) Mike O'Brien	(United Kingdom) **Dennis Leech**	(United Kingdom) Mark Hales	(United Kingdom) Roger Saunders	(United Kingdom) Chris Hodgetts
4	Thruxton Circuit, Hampshire	25 May	(United Kingdom) Andy Rouse	(United Kingdom) Andy Rouse	(United Kingdom) **Andy Rouse**	(United Kingdom) Mark Hales	(United Kingdom) Roger Saunders	(United Kingdom) Geoff Kimber-Smith
5	Silverstone Circuit, Northamptonshire	7 June	(United Kingdom) Andy Rouse	(United Kingdom) Pete Hall	(United Kingdom) **Tim Harvey**	(United Kingdom) Mark Hales	(United Kingdom) Roger Saunders	(United Kingdom) Chris Hodgetts
6	Silverstone Circuit, Northamptonshire	12 July	(United Kingdom) Win Percy	(United Kingdom) Win Percy	(United Kingdom) **Win Percy**	(United Kingdom) Frank Sytner	(United Kingdom) Roger Saunders	(United Kingdom) Chris Hodgetts
7	Brands Hatch, Kent	26 July	(United Kingdom) Andy Rouse	(United Kingdom) Andy Rouse	(United Kingdom) **Tim Harvey**	(United Kingdom) Jon Dooley	(United Kingdom) Colin Pearcy	(United Kingdom) Chris Hodgetts
8	Snetterton Motor Racing Circuit, Norfolk	2 August	(United Kingdom) Mike O'Brien	(United Kingdom) Mike O'Brien (United Kingdom) Pete Hall	(United Kingdom) **Mike O'Brien**	(United Kingdom) Jon Dooley	(United Kingdom) Colin Pearcy	(United Kingdom) Chris Hodgetts
9	Donington Park, Leicestershire	16 August	(United Kingdom) Frank Sytner	(United Kingdom) Graham Goode	(United Kingdom) Graham Goode	(United Kingdom) **Frank Sytner**	(United Kingdom) Colin Pearcy	(United Kingdom) Chris Hodgetts
10*	Oulton Park, Cheshire	22 August	(United Kingdom) Pete Hall (United Kingdom) Andy Rouse	(United Kingdom) Jeff Allam	(United Kingdom) **Mike Newman** (United Kingdom) **Rob Speak**	(United Kingdom) Lionel Wiffen (United Kingdom) Mark Hales	(United Kingdom) Alan Minshaw (United Kingdom) Vic Lee	(United Kingdom) Chris Hodgetts (United Kingdom) Tiff Needell
11	Donington Park, Leicestershire	20 September	(United Kingdom) Andy Rouse	(United Kingdom) Andy Rouse	(United Kingdom) **Andy Rouse**	(United Kingdom) Frank Sytner	(United Kingdom) Colin Pearcy	(United Kingdom) Chris Hodgetts
12	Silverstone Circuit, Northamptonshire	6 October	(United Kingdom) Pete Hall	(United Kingdom) Pete Hall	(United Kingdom) **Pete Hall**	(United Kingdom) Graham Hathaway	(United Kingdom) Colin Pearcy	(United Kingdom) Mark Hales

- 30 lap endurance race.

== Driver Standings/Results ==
Overall DC	Class Pos	Driver	Class	SIL	OUL	THR	THR	SIL	SIL	BRH	SNE	DON	OUL	DON	SIL	Pts
1	1	(United Kingdom) Chris Hodgetts	D	**8**	**8**	**5**	**11**	**9**	**12**	**7**	**7**	**9**	**3**/5	8		84
2	1	(United Kingdom) Mark Hales	B	**7**	7	**8**	**9**	8	Ret	14	**Ret**	10	DNS/7	**9**		51
3	2	(United Kingdom) Jon Dooley	B	9	**12**	12	DNS	**Ret**	18	9	9	8	8	15	8	47
4	1	(United Kingdom) Tim Harvey	A	Ret	1	Ret	2	1	5	1	Ret	Ret	NC	4	3	45
=	2	(United Kingdom) Geoff Kimber-Smith	D	Ret		9	8	10	13	8	8	11	9	11	Ret	45
6	2	(United Kingdom) Dennis Leech	A	2		**1**	4	2	7	2	4	3	6	16	Ret	44
7	1	(United Kingdom) Colin Pearcy	C	**11**					20	**11**	**12**	**12**	**DNS**	14	**12**	43
8	3	(United Kingdom) Andy Rouse	A	**1**			**1**	**Ret**		**3**			**Ret**‡	**1**		35
9	4	(United Kingdom) Graham Goode	A	5	2	2	Ret	3	4	15	5	**2**	Ret			34
=	5	(United Kingdom) David Carvell	A	3	6	3	3	4	Ret	Ret	2	Ret	2	DNS	2	34
11	3	(United Kingdom) Frank Sytner	B						**3**	**Ret**		**1**	**Ret**	**2**		32
12	6	(United Kingdom) Pete Hall	A	4	5	6	10	6	6	4	3	4	**Ret**	Ret	**1**	31
13	2	(United Kingdom) Roger Saunders	C	WD	**11**	11	**13**	**12**	**17**	13	DNS	14	11	Ret	Ret	28
14	7	(United Kingdom) Mike O'Brien	A		**Ret**	4	5	Ret	8	5	**1**		Ret	3	4	27
15	8	(United Kingdom) Mike Newman	A		3	7	6	5	10		6	6	1	6		21
16	3	(United Kingdom) Phil Dowsett	D				14	11	19			15			14	19
17	9	(United Kingdom) Graham Scarborough	A	6	4	Ret	7	Ret	9	Ret	Ret	5	4	5	5	16
18	4	(United Kingdom) Tiff Needell	D						16				5/3‡	10	**Ret**	15
19	3	(United Kingdom) Alan Minshaw	C						22	12		Ret	10	**Ret**		14
=	4	(United Kingdom) Lionel Wiffen	B								11	Ret	7	DNS	11	14
21	5	(United Kingdom) Kevin Eaton	B	Ret					Ret			7		7	Ret	12
22	10	(United Kingdom) Win Percy	A						**1**				Ret‡			10
=	6	(United Kingdom) Rob Kirby	B	DNA	Ret	DNS	Ret	Ret	15	Ret			8‡			10
24	5	(United Kingdom) Tony Crudgington	D	DNS			12	13	21						Ret	9
25	11	(United Kingdom) Jeff Allam	A										2‡			7
26	7	(United Kingdom) Karl Jones	B						Ret	DSQ				Ret	**10**	6
=	12	(United Kingdom) Dave Brodie	A						2							6
28	5	(United Kingdom) Peter Gotlieb	C							16						3
=	4	(United Kingdom) Alex Postan	C						23							3
30	6	(United Kingdom) Paul Harmer	C						28	17						2
=	7	(United Kingdom) David Grimshaw	C			**DSQ**			24							2
32	14	(United Kingdom) Brian Chatfield	A						11	6	Ret					1
=	15	(Australia) Rex Muldoon	A												6	1
=	8	(United Kingdom) Niki Phillips	C						25							1
35	16	(United Kingdom) Bill Griffin	A				Ret	7								0
=	9	(United Kingdom) Les Germain	C						26	Ret						0
=	10	(United Kingdom) Anthony Pownall	C						27							0
–		(United Kingdom) Jerry Mahony	A						Ret	Ret						0
–		(United Kingdom) Robb Gravett	A						Ret							0
–		(United Kingdom) Dave Morgan	A						Ret							0
–		(United Kingdom) Mike Smith	A						Ret							0
–		(United Kingdom) David Kay	C											Ret		0
–		(United Kingdom) Chris Aylett	A												Ret	0
–		(United Kingdom) Graham Rose	A	DNS												0
–		(United Kingdom) David Gibson	C				WD									0
–		(United Kingdom) David Martell	C				WD									0
guest drivers ineligible for points
–		(United Kingdom) Rob Speak	A										1‡			0
–		(United Kingdom) Lionel Abbott	A										4‡			0
–		(United Kingdom) Karl Jones	A										6‡			0
–		(United Kingdom) Graham Hathaway	B										PO‡		7	0
–		(United Kingdom) Mark Hales	B												9	0
–		(United Kingdom) Chuck Nicholson	D		9											0
–		(United Kingdom) Gerry Marshall	D										9‡			0
–		(United Kingdom) Alan Minshaw	D	10	PO											0
–		(United Kingdom) Alex Moss	D		10	DNA				10						0
–		(United Kingdom) Paul Longfield	D	12		10										0
–		(United Kingdom) Patrick Watts	D								10					0
–		(United Kingdom) Vic Lee	C										10‡			0
–		(United Kingdom) Holman 'Les' Blackburn	C										11‡			0
–		(United Kingdom) Richard Belcher	D											12		0
–		(United Kingdom) Tony Dron	D									13				0
–		(United Kingdom) Keith Norman	D											13		0
–		(United Kingdom) Mark Goddard	D												13	0
–		(United Kingdom) Will Hoy	D						14							0
–		(United Kingdom) David Leslie	A										NC‡			0
–		(Australia) Gary Brabham	A										Ret‡			0
–		(United Kingdom) Mike Smith	B										**Ret**‡			0
–		(United Kingdom) Paul Taft	C										**DNS**‡			0
–		(United Kingdom) Phil Dowsett	B										PO‡			0
Overall DC	Class Pos	Driver	Class	SIL	OUL	THR	THR	SIL	SIL	BRH	SNE	DON	OUL	DON	SIL	Pts

‡ Endurance driver

== Championship results ==
Driver's championship
Pos.	Driver	Car	Class	Points
1	(United Kingdom) Chris Hodgetts	Toyota Corolla GT	D	84
2	(United Kingdom) Mark Hales	Ford Escort RS Turbo	B	51
3	(United Kingdom) Jon Dooley	Alfa Romeo 75 Turbo	B	47
4	(United Kingdom) Geoff Kimber-Smith	Toyota Corolla GT	D	45
4	(United Kingdom) Tim Harvey	Rover Vitesse	A	45
6	(United Kingdom) Dennis Leech	Rover Vitesse	A	44
7	(United Kingdom) Colin Pearcy	MG Metro Turbo	C	43
8	(United Kingdom) Andy Rouse	Ford RS Cosworth	A	35
9	(United Kingdom) Graham Goode	Ford RS Cosworth	A	34
9	(United Kingdom) David Carvell	Rover Vitesse	A	34
11	(United Kingdom) Frank Sytner	BMW M3	B	32
12	(United Kingdom) Pete Hall	Ford RS Cosworth	A	31
13	(United Kingdom) Roger Saunders	Renault 5GT Turbo	C	28
14	(United Kingdom) Mike O'Brien	Holden Commodore VK	A	27
