= Jon Dooley =

British racing driver (1946–2020)

Jon Dooley (29 April 1946 – 2 September 2020) was a British racing driver. He finished third overall in the British Touring Car Championship on three occasions, in 1981, 1984 and 1987 competing in cars from the Alfa Romeo marque. He competed in the BSCC/BTCC from 1976 to 1989, all but one race in an Alfa Romeo.

== Racing record ==
=== Complete British Saloon / Touring Car Championship results ===
(key) (Races in bold indicate pole position) (Races in italics indicate fastest lap – 1 point awarded ?–1989 in class)

Year	Team	Car	Class	1	2	3	4	5	6	7	8	9	10	11	12	13	14	15	DC	Pts	Class
1976	Campari Alfa Romeo Dealer Team	Alfa Romeo Alfasud Ti	A	BRH ?	SIL; Ret	OUL	THR; 17	THR	SIL	BRH; Ret	MAL ?†	SNE ?†	BRH ?						10th	28	**3rd**
1977	Napolina Alfa Romeo Dealer Team	Alfa Romeo Alfetta GTV	C	SIL	BRH ?	OUL ?†	THR ?	SIL ?	THR	DON	SIL; Ret	DON ?†	BRH	THR	BRH				31st	1	9th
1978	Napolina Alfa Romeo Dealer Team	Alfa Romeo Alfetta GTV	C	SIL ?	OUL	THR	BRH	SIL ?	DON ?†	MAL ?†	BRH; Ret	DON; 10†	BRH ?	THR	OUL				22nd	17	6th
1979	Napolina Alfa Romeo Dealer Team	Alfa Romeo Alfasud Ti	A	SIL	OUL; 7†	THR; 25	SIL; 23	DON ?	SIL ?	MAL; 5†	DON ?	BRH ?	THR ?	SNE ?	OUL				11th	39	**3rd**
1980	Napolina Alfa Romeo Dealer Team	Alfa Romeo Alfasud Ti	A	MAL; 10†	OUL	THR; 15	SIL; 20	SIL; Ret	BRH ?	MAL; 5†	BRH ?	THR ?	SIL; 22						5th	58	**2nd**
1980	Napolina Alfa Romeo Dealer Team	Alfa Romeo Alfetta GTV	C	MAL; 9†						MAL ?†									5th	58	8th
1981	Napolina Alfa Romeo Dealer Team	Alfa Romeo Alfasud Ti	A	MAL; 4†	SIL; 13	OUL; 4†	THR ?	BRH; 6†	SIL ?	SIL; 16	DON; 10†	BRH; 16	THR ?	SIL; 10					**3rd**	**65**	**1st**
1982	Napolina Alfa Romeo Dealer Team	Alfa Romeo Alfetta GTV6	C	SIL; Ret		OUL; 8†	THR; 15	THR; 22	SIL; Ret	DON; 15	BRH; 10	DON; Ret	BRH; Ret	SIL; 8					8th	49	**2nd**
1982	Napolina Alfa Romeo Dealer Team	Alfa Romeo Alfasud Ti	A		MAL; 6†	OUL; Ret†													8th	49	6th
1983	Napolina Alfa Romeo Dealer Team	Alfa Romeo Alfetta GTV6	B	SIL; Ret	OUL; 4	THR; 4	BRH; 6	THR; Ret	SIL; Ret	DON; Ret	SIL; 10	DON; Ret	BRH; 18	SIL; 9					6th	36	**3rd**
1984	Napolina Alfa Romeo Dealer Team	Alfa Romeo Alfetta GTV6	B	DON; 12	SIL; Ret	OUL; Ret	THR; 19	THR; 8	SIL; 12	SNE; 7	BRH; 8	BRH; 8	DON; 9	SIL; 11					**3rd**	**51**	**1st**
1985	John West Foods Alfa Romeo Dealer Team	Alfa Romeo Alfetta GTV6	B	SIL; 7	OUL; 5	THR; Ret	DON; 7	THR; 4	SIL; 9	DON; 9	SIL; 6	SNE; Ret	BRH; Ret	BRH; 8	SIL; Ret				9th	43	**3rd**
1986	John West Foods Alfa Romeo Dealer Team	Alfa Romeo 75	B	SIL	THR; 6	SIL; Ret	DON; Ret	BRH; NC	SNE; 6	BRH; 9	DON; 6	SIL; 6							10th	23	4th
1987	John West Foods Alfa Romeo Dealer Team	Alfa Romeo 75 Turbo	B	SIL; 9	OUL; 12	THR; 12	THR; DNS	SIL; Ret	SIL; 18	BRH; 9	SNE; 9	DON; 8	OUL; 8	DON; 15	SIL; 8				**3rd**	**47**	**2nd**
1988	Brookside Garage	Alfa Romeo 75	B	SIL	OUL	THR	DON	THR	SIL	SIL	BRH	SNE	BRH	BIR	DON; DNQ	SIL; Ret			NC	0	NC
1989	Terry Drury Racing	Ford Sierra RS500	A	OUL	SIL	THR	DON	THR	SIL	SIL	BRH	SNE	BRH	BIR	DON	SIL ?			NC	0	NC

† Events with 2 races staged for the different classes.
