= 1985 British Saloon Car Championship =

28th season of the British Touring Car Championship

Seasons
- ← 1984 1986 →

The 1985 RAC Trimoco British Saloon Car Championship was the 28th season of the championship. Andy Rouse won his third consecutive BSCC championship in a Ford Sierra, making it a record four titles in total.

== Teams & Drivers ==
Guest drivers in italics.

Team	Car	No.	Drivers	Rounds
Class A
Industrial Control Services Ltd. Radiopaging	Ford Sierra XR4Ti	1	(United Kingdom) Andy Rouse	2–12
Industrial Control Services Ltd. Radiopaging	Ford Sierra XR4Ti	15	(Germany) Klaus Niedzwiedz	8
Industrial Control Services Ltd. Radiopaging	Ford Sierra XR4Ti	15	(United Kingdom) David Sears	11
Industrial Control Services Ltd. Radiopaging	Rover Vitesse	2	(United Kingdom) Pete Hall	All
Tom Walkinshaw Racing	Rover Vitesse	3	(United Kingdom) Tom Walkinshaw	10
Dennis Leech	Rover Vitesse	4	(United Kingdom) Dennis Leech	8, 11–12
Mitsubishi Colt Racing	Mitsubishi Starion Turbo	5	(United Kingdom) Dave Brodie	5–12
Mitsubishi Colt Racing	Mitsubishi Starion Turbo	6	(United Kingdom) Dave Brodie	2–4
Mitsubishi Colt Racing	Mitsubishi Starion Turbo	6	(Australia) Vern Schuppan	8
Mitsubishi Colt Racing	Mitsubishi Starion Turbo	6	(Japan) Kunimitsu Takahashi	12
Team Toyota GB/Hughes of Beaconsfield	Toyota Celica Supra	7	(United Kingdom) Barry Sheene	All
Brian Chatfield	Ford Capri III 3.0S	8	(United Kingdom) Brian Chatfield	1–3, 12
Brian Chatfield	BMW 635CSi	8	(United Kingdom) Brian Chatfield	7–8, 11
Sytner BMW Racing with GSi	BMW 635CSi	9	(United Kingdom) Frank Sytner	1–4, 6–9, 11–12
Castrol Sport Racing with Connells Estate Agents plc	Rover Vitesse	11	(United Kingdom) Neil McGrath	1–9, 11–12
Burlington Wallcoverings Ltd.	BMW 635CSi	12	(United Kingdom) Mike Newman	2–3, 5–8, 10–12
Class B
Ilford Photo	Ford Escort RS Turbo	10	(United Kingdom) Mike Smith	8, 11
Napolina Alfa Romeo Dealer Team; John West Foods – Alfa Romeo; Dealer Team	Alfa Romeo GTV6	30	(United Kingdom) Jon Dooley	All
Napolina Alfa Romeo Dealer Team; John West Foods – Alfa Romeo; Dealer Team	Alfa Romeo GTV6	32	(United Kingdom) Rob Kirby	All
Graham Goode Racing	Nissan Bluebird Turbo	31	(United Kingdom) Graham Goode	1–10
Demon Tweeks Accessories – Triple C Magazine	Volkswagen Golf GTI 1.8	33	(United Kingdom) Alan Minshaw	8
Roger Dowson Engineering	MG Metro Turbo	34	(United Kingdom) Steve Soper	1
Terry Drury Racing	Alfa Romeo GTV6	40	(United Kingdom) Phil Dowsett	1–9
Terry Drury Racing	Alfa Romeo GTV6	41	(United Kingdom) Terry Drury	1–6
Terry Drury Racing	Alfa Romeo GTV6	41	(United Kingdom) Mark Hales	7–9
Terry Drury Racing	Alfa Romeo GTV6	41	(United Kingdom) Barry Barnes	11
Royal Mail Datapost	Ford Escort RS Turbo	44	(United Kingdom) Richard Longman	6–12
Racal Vodafone	Ford Escort RS Turbo	?	(United Kingdom) David Grimshaw	11
Joe Simons Racing	Renault 5 GT Turbo	?	(United Kingdom) Alex Postan	11
Class C
Tony Crudgington	Toyota Corolla GT	62	(United Kingdom) Tony Crudgington	1, 6–12
Autocar Magazine with Marshall Asquith	Ford Escort RS1600i	63	(United Kingdom) Karl Jones	8
Stig Gruen	Toyota Corolla GT	65	(Sweden) Stig Gruen	1–3, 5, 10
Royal Mail Datapost	Ford Escort RS1600i	66	(United Kingdom) Alan Curnow	All
Brooklyn Motorsport/ECS	Ford Escort RS1600i	69	(United Kingdom) Chris Hodgetts	All
Brooklyn Motorsport/ECS	Ford Escort RS1600i	79	(United Kingdom) John Morris	All
Brooklyn Motorsport/ECS	Ford Escort RS1600i	85	(United Kingdom) Alex Moss	8–12
North Essex Motorsport	Ford Escort RS1600i	70	(United Kingdom) Patrick Watts	3–6, 8–12
John Jeffreys Engineering	Ford Escort RS1600i	74	(United Kingdom) Richard Belcher	All
AGK Motorsport racing with Peat Technology; AGK Motorsport	Toyota Corolla GT	77	(United Kingdom) Geoff Kimber-Smith	1–5, 7–12
Barry Lee	Ford Escort RS1600i	84	(United Kingdom) Barry Lee	8–9

== Calendar & Winners ==
All races were held in the United Kingdom. Overall winners in **bold**.

Round	Circuit	Date	Class A Winner	Class B Winner	Class C Winner
1	Silverstone Circuit, Northamptonshire	24 March	(United Kingdom) **Frank Sytner**	(United Kingdom) Graham Goode	(United Kingdom) Richard Belcher
2	Oulton Park, Cheshire	5 April	(United Kingdom) **Andy Rouse**	(United Kingdom) Graham Goode	(United Kingdom) Alan Curnow
3	Thruxton Circuit, Hampshire	8 April	(United Kingdom) **Dave Brodie**	(United Kingdom) Rob Kirby	(United Kingdom) Richard Belcher
4	Donington Park, Leicestershire	5 May	(United Kingdom) **Andy Rouse**	(United Kingdom) Graham Goode	(United Kingdom) Chris Hodgetts
5	Thruxton Circuit, Hampshire	27 May	(United Kingdom) **Andy Rouse**	(United Kingdom) Jon Dooley	(United Kingdom) Chris Hodgetts
6	Silverstone Circuit, Northamptonshire	9 June	(United Kingdom) **Andy Rouse**	(United Kingdom) Richard Longman	(United Kingdom) Richard Belcher
7	Donington Park, Leicestershire	14 July	(United Kingdom) **Andy Rouse**	(United Kingdom) Graham Goode	(United Kingdom) Chris Hodgetts
8	Silverstone Circuit, Northamptonshire	21 July	(United Kingdom) **Andy Rouse**	(United Kingdom) Richard Longman	(United Kingdom) Chris Hodgetts
9	Snetterton Motor Racing Circuit, Norfolk	11 August	(United Kingdom) **Andy Rouse**	(United Kingdom) Richard Longman	(United Kingdom) Chris Hodgetts
10	Brands Hatch, Kent	26 August	(United Kingdom) **Tom Walkinshaw**	(United Kingdom) Graham Goode	(United Kingdom) Chris Hodgetts
11	Brands Hatch, Kent	6 October	(United Kingdom) **Andy Rouse**	(United Kingdom) Jon Dooley	(United Kingdom) Chris Hodgetts
12	Silverstone Circuit, Northamptonshire	13 October	(United Kingdom) **Andy Rouse**	(United Kingdom) Rob Kirby	(United Kingdom) Richard Belcher

== Championship Standings ==
=== Drivers' Championship ===
Points were awarded on a 9, 6, 4, 3, 2, 1 basis to the top six finishers in each class, with one bonus point for the fastest lap in each class. In races where a class had less than four starters, points would be awarded to the top two finishers (6 & 4 respectively) with one point for the fastest lap. A driver's best nine scores counted towards the championship, dropped scores are shown in brackets. Positions are shown as overall/class.

Pos	Driver	Class	SIL	OUL	THR	DON	THR	SIL	DON	SIL	SNE	BRA	BRA	SIL	Pts
1	(United Kingdom) Andy Rouse	A		1/1	Ret	1/1	**1/1**	1/1	**1/1**	1/1	1/1	(2/2)	1/1	**1/1**	86
2	(United Kingdom) Chris Hodgetts	C	10/2	9/2	(9/3)	**10/1**	**7/1**	(13/3)	14/1	13/1	**10/1**	**8/1**	**10/1**	DNS	77
3	(United Kingdom) Richard Belcher	C	**9/1**	12/4	6/1	Ret	8/2	11/1	**Ret**	Ret	11/2	10/3	15/4	10/1	60
4	(United Kingdom) Dave Brodie	A		13/4	**1/1**	**2/2**	3/3	**Ret**	2/2	**2/2**	**Ret**	**3/3**	**3/3**	2/2	54
5	(United Kingdom) Alan Curnow	C	13/5	**8/1**	**7/2**	11/2	Ret	**12/2**	Ret	**Ret**	13/4	9/2	13/2	11/2	52
6	(United Kingdom) Rob Kirby	B	6/2	7/4	8/1	9/4	5/2	8/2	(11/5)	(10/5)	8/4	Ret	9/2	8/1	49
7	(United Kingdom) Richard Longman	B						6/1	8/2	5/1	4/1	7/2	**18/4**	**Ret**	45
8	(United Kingdom) Neil McGrath	A	**2/2**	2/2	2/2	3/3	2/2	(4/4)	4/3	4/4	2/2		(6/6)	4/4	45
9	(United Kingdom) Jon Dooley	B	7/3	**5/3**	**Ret**	7/2	**4/1**	9/3	9/3	6/2	Ret	Ret	8/1	Ret	43
10	(United Kingdom) Graham Goode^{1}	B	4/1	3/1	Ret	**5/1**	6/3	**DSQ**	**3/1**	**DSQ**	**6/2**	**6/1**			37
11	(United Kingdom) Frank Sytner	A	1/1	Ret	4/4	4/4		2/2	6/5	Ret	3/3		4/4	Ret	30
12	(United Kingdom) John Morris	C	11/3	Ret	10/4	14/4	DNS	Ret	15/2	Ret	14/5	11/4	Ret	13/4	24
13	(United Kingdom) Phil Dowsett	B	Ret	4/2	Ret	8/3	DNS	10/4	12/6	9/4	7/3				21
14	(United Kingdom) Geoff Kimber-Smith	C	12/4	Ret	Ret	DNS	DNS		17/3	14/2	Ret	12/5	14/3	**14/5**	21
15	(United Kingdom) Pete Hall	A	3/3	Ret	DNP	6/5	9/4	5/5	16/8	7/5	5/4	5/5	7/7	5/5	20
16	(United Kingdom) Barry Sheene	A	5/4	**Ret**	3/3	Ret	DNS	3/3	5/4	Ret	Ret	4/4	DNS	6/6	18
17	(United Kingdom) Tony Crudgington	C	DNS					15/4	18/4	16/3	12/3	14/7	Ret	Ret	15
18	(United Kingdom) Mike Newman	A		6/3	5/5		DNS	7/6	7/6	DNS		Ret	5/5	7/7	10
19	(United Kingdom) Mark Hales	B							10/4	8/3	9/5				9
20	(United Kingdom) Patrick Watts	C			Ret	13/3	DNS	NC		Ret	16/7	13/6	16/5	Ret	7
21	(United Kingdom) David Sears	A											2/2		6
22	(Sweden) Stig Gruen	C	DNS	11/3	11/5		DNS					Ret			6
23	(United Kingdom) Alex Moss	C								Ret	15/6	15/8	17/6	12/3	6
24	(United Kingdom) Terry Drury	B	DNS	10/5	Ret	12/5	DNS	14/5							6
25	(United Kingdom) Dennis Leech	A								15/7			Ret	3/3	4
26	(Germany) Klaus Niedzwiedz	A								3/3					4
27	(United Kingdom) Barry Barnes	B											12/3		4
28	(United Kingdom) Karl Jones	C								18/4					3
29	(United Kingdom) Brian Chatfield	A	8/5	DSQ	DNP				13/7	11/6			11/8	Ret	3
30	(United Kingdom) Barry Lee	C								19/5	Ret				2
31	(United Kingdom) David Grimshaw	B											19/5		2
32	(United Kingdom) Alan Minshaw	B								12/6					1
33	(United Kingdom) Alex Postan	B											20/6		1
34	(United Kingdom) Mike Smith	B								17/7			Ret		0
35	(Japan) Kunimitsu Takahashi	A												9/8	0
NC	(United Kingdom) Steve Soper	B	**Ret**												0
NC	(Australia) Vern Schuppan	A								Ret					0
guest drivers ineligible for points
	(United Kingdom) Tom Walkinshaw	A										1/1			0
Pos	Driver	Class	SIL	OUL	THR	DON	THR	SIL	DON	SIL	SNE	BRA	BRA	SIL	Pts

Colour	Result
Gold	Winner
Silver	Second place
Bronze	Third place
Green	Points classification
Blue	Non-points classification
Blue	Non-classified finish (NC)
Purple	Retired, not classified (Ret)
Red	Did not qualify (DNQ)
Red	Did not pre-qualify (DNPQ)
Black	Disqualified (DSQ)
White	Did not start (DNS)
White	Withdrew (WD)
White	Race cancelled (C)
Blank	Did not practice (DNP)
Blank	Did not arrive (DNA)
Blank	Excluded (EX)

**Bold** - Pole in class
Italics - Fastest lap in class

Notes:

1. – Graham Goode was docked 20 points for technical infringements.
