= 1988 British Touring Car Championship =

31st season of the British Touring Car Championship

Seasons
- ← 1987 1989 →

The 1988 Dunlop RAC British Touring Car Championship was the 31st season of the championship. The drivers title was won by Frank Sytner, driving a BMW Team Finance BMW M3. Second place overall was Phil Dowsett who dominated class D. Andy Rouse finished third on points, winning nine races outright of the twelve rounds.

== Teams and drivers ==
Team	Car	No.	Drivers	Rounds	Endurance drivers
Class A
MIL Motorsport	Toyota Supra Turbo	1	(United Kingdom) Chris Hodgetts	1–2, 4–6	(United Kingdom) Vic Lee
MIL Motorsport	Toyota Supra Turbo	1	(United Kingdom) Mark Hales	7–9, 11–12	(United Kingdom) Vic Lee
MIL Motorsport	Toyota Supra Turbo	1	(United Kingdom) Ian Flux	10, 13	(United Kingdom) Vic Lee
MIL Motorsport	Toyota Supra Turbo	2	(United Kingdom) Vic Lee	5–10	
Dennis Leech	Rover Vitesse	4	(United Kingdom) Dennis Leech	3–8	(United Kingdom) David Carvell
Terry Drury Racing	Ford Sierra RS500	5	(United Kingdom) Tim Harvey	1–3, 5–13	
Eggenberger Motorsport	Ford Sierra RS500	6	(United Kingdom) Steve Soper	2–3, 8, 11–12	
Eggenberger Motorsport	Ford Sierra RS500	6	(Italy) Gianfranco Brancatelli	13	
Alan Docking Racing	Holden VL Commodore SS Group A	7	(United Kingdom) Mike O'Brien	1–9	(United Kingdom) Sean Brown
Alan Docking Racing	Holden VL Commodore SS Group A SV	7	(United Kingdom) Mike O'Brien	10–13	(United Kingdom) Sean Brown
Arquati Racing Team	Ford Sierra RS500	8	(United Kingdom) Jerry Mahony	All	(United Kingdom) Mark Hales
ICS plc	Ford Sierra RS500	10	(United Kingdom) Pete Hall	1–2	(United Kingdom) Gary Ayles
ICS plc	Ford Sierra RS500	10	(United Kingdom) Robb Gravett	3–11	(United Kingdom) Gary Ayles
ICS plc	Ford Sierra RS500	10	(United Kingdom) Mark Hales	13	(United Kingdom) Gary Ayles
Brooklyn Motorsport	Ford Sierra RS500	11	(United Kingdom) Chris Hodgetts	10–13	
Tom Walkinshaw Racing	Holden VL Commodore SS Group A SV	12	(United Kingdom) Tom Walkinshaw	11	
Burlington Wallcoverings Ltd.	Ford Sierra RS500	14	(United Kingdom) Mike Newman	All	(United Kingdom) Rob Speak
Listerine-Texaco Racing	Ford Sierra RS500	15	(United Kingdom) Graham Goode	All	(United Kingdom) Alistair Lyall
Asquith Autosport	Ford Sierra RS500	16	(United Kingdom) Karl Jones	All	(United Kingdom) Ian Flux
CC Motorsport	Ford Sierra RS500	17	(United Kingdom) Bob Sands	1–4	(United Kingdom) Richard Jones
CAM Shipping	Ford Sierra RS500	19	(United Kingdom) Laurence Bristow	All	(United Kingdom) Tim Harvey
Graham Hathaway	Ford Sierra RS500	20	(United Kingdom) Graham Hathaway	1–7, 9–13	(United Kingdom) Peter Townsend
Graham Hathaway	Ford Sierra RS500	20	(United Kingdom) Rob Wilson	8	(United Kingdom) Peter Townsend
Kaliber Racing	Ford Sierra RS500	21	(United Kingdom) Guy Edwards	3–13	(United Kingdom) Johnny Dumfries
Kaliber Racing	Ford Sierra RS500	22	(United Kingdom) Andy Rouse	All	(United Kingdom) David Sears
Nissan Motorsport Europe	Nissan HR31 Skyline GTS-R	23	(United Kingdom) Win Percy	4	(Australia) Allan Grice
Trident Motorsport	Maserati Biturbo	24	(United Kingdom) Nick May	4–6, 8–13	(United Kingdom) John Lepp
Trident Motorsport	Maserati Biturbo	24	(United Kingdom) John Lepp	7	(United Kingdom) John Lepp
ECM Vehicle Delivery Ltd.	Ford Sierra RS500	26	(United Kingdom) Ray MacDowall	8, 12	
ECM Vehicle Delivery Ltd.	Ford Sierra RS500	26	(United Kingdom) Tom Bell	9, 13	
Peter Buxtorf	BMW 635CSi	27	(Switzerland) Peter Buxtorf	1–4	(United Kingdom) Barry Robinson
Brodie Brittain Racing	Ford Sierra RS500	30	(United Kingdom) Dave Brodie	13	
Class B
Brookside Garage	Alfa Romeo 75	31	(United Kingdom) Jon Dooley	12–13	
BMW Finance Racing with Mobil 1	BMW M3	32	(United Kingdom) Mike Smith	1–11	(United Kingdom) Will Hoy
BMW Finance Racing with Mobil 1	BMW M3	32	(United Kingdom) James Weaver	12	(United Kingdom) Will Hoy
BMW Finance Racing with Mobil 1	BMW M3	32	(United Kingdom) Will Hoy	13	(United Kingdom) Will Hoy
BMW Finance Racing with Mobil 1	BMW M3	33	(United Kingdom) Frank Sytner	All	(United Kingdom) James Weaver
BMW Finance Racing with Mobil 1	BMW M3	34	(United Kingdom) Will Hoy	8–9	
BMW Finance Racing with Mobil 1	BMW M3	34	(United Kingdom) Lionel Abbott	10, 12	
BMW Finance Racing with Mobil 1	BMW M3	34	(United Kingdom) James Weaver	11	
John Maguire Racing	BMW M3	36	(United Kingdom) Godfrey Hall	4–6, 10–12	(United Kingdom) Barrie Williams
John Maguire Racing	BMW M3	36	(United Kingdom) David Sears	12–13	(United Kingdom) Barrie Williams
John Maguire Racing	BMW M3	43	(United Kingdom) Godfrey Hall	1–3, 7–9, 13	
Terry Drury Racing	Ford Escort RS Turbo	38	(United Kingdom) Dave Wallis	1–4	(United Kingdom) Lionel Abbott
Terry Drury Racing	Ford Escort RS Turbo	39	(United Kingdom) Lionel Wiffen	1–5, 10–11, 13	(United Kingdom) Robin Parsons
Demon Tweeks	BMW M3	44	(United Kingdom) Alan Minshaw	1–4, 8	(Austria) Roland Ratzenberger
Demon Tweeks	BMW M3	44	(Austria) Roland Ratzenberger	5–7, 10–13	(Austria) Roland Ratzenberger
Demon Tweeks	BMW M3	44	(United Kingdom) Chris Hodgetts	9	(Austria) Roland Ratzenberger
Class C
Hawes Group Racing	Honda Prelude 2.0i	46	(United Kingdom) Martin Wray	8	
Specialist Cars Aberdeen	Volkswagen Golf GTI	48	(United Kingdom) Andrew Jeffrey	2–4, 7–13	(United Kingdom) John Clark
Demon Tweeks	Volkswagen Golf GTI	50	(United Kingdom) James Kaye	1–2	(United Kingdom) John Llewellyn
Demon Tweeks	Volkswagen Golf GTI	50	(United Kingdom) John Brindley	3–6	(United Kingdom) John Llewellyn
Demon Tweeks	Volkswagen Golf GTI	50	(United Kingdom) Andy Middlehurst	7	(United Kingdom) John Llewellyn
Demon Tweeks	Volkswagen Golf GTI	50	(United Kingdom) John Morris	8	(United Kingdom) John Llewellyn
Demon Tweeks	Volkswagen Golf GTI	50	(United Kingdom) Alan Minshaw	11–13	(United Kingdom) John Llewellyn
John Maguire Racing	Volkswagen Golf GTI	55	(United Kingdom) James Shead	1, 3–13	(United Kingdom) John Morris
Class D
Chris Hodgetts Motor Sport	Toyota Corolla GT	60	(United Kingdom) Richard Belcher	1	(United Kingdom) Patrick Watts
Chris Hodgetts Motor Sport	Toyota Corolla GT	60	(United Kingdom) Mark Hales	2, 4	(United Kingdom) Patrick Watts
Chris Hodgetts Motor Sport	Toyota Corolla GT	60	(United Kingdom) Mark Goddard	13	(United Kingdom) Patrick Watts
Chris Hodgetts Motor Sport	Toyota Corolla GT	61	(United Kingdom) Mark Hales	6	
Chris Hodgetts Motor Sport	Toyota Corolla GT	61	(United Kingdom) Dave Loudoun	7	
Chris Hodgetts Motor Sport	Toyota Corolla GT	61	(United Kingdom) Nick Whale	11	
Tony Crudgington	Toyota Corolla GT	63	(United Kingdom) Tony Crudgington	1, 3–13	(United Kingdom) Alastair Davidson
MIL Motorsport	Toyota Corolla GT	69	(United Kingdom) Kevin Eaton	1–2, 4	(United Kingdom) Alex Moss
MIL Motorsport	Toyota Corolla GT	69	(United Kingdom) John Llewellyn	7–13	(United Kingdom) Alex Moss
TOM's GB	Toyota Corolla FX GT	70	(United Kingdom) Phil Dowsett	All	(United Kingdom) Tiff Needell
North Essex Motorsport	Ford Escort RS1600i	74	(United Kingdom) Vic Lee	3	
North Essex Motorsport	Ford Escort RS1600i	74	(United Kingdom) Jeremy Rossiter	7	
North Essex Motorsport	Ford Escort RS1600i	74	(United Kingdom) Barbara Cowell	8–11, 13	
Alan Gaunt	Ford Escort RS1600i	75	(United Kingdom) Mark Goddard	7–8	
AGK Motorsport	Toyota Corolla GT	77	(United Kingdom) Geoff Kimber-Smith	1–7, 9–13	(United Kingdom) Barbara Cowell

== Calendar ==
All races were held in the United Kingdom. Overall winners in **bold**.

Round	Circuit	Date	Pole position	Fastest lap	Class A winner	Class B winner	Class C Winner	Class D Winner
1	Silverstone Circuit (National), Northamptonshire	27 March	(United Kingdom) Andy Rouse	(United Kingdom) Andy Rouse	(United Kingdom) **Jerry Mahony**	(United Kingdom) Frank Sytner	(United Kingdom) James Kaye	(United Kingdom) Phil Dowsett
2	Oulton Park (International), Cheshire	1 April	(United Kingdom) Andy Rouse	(United Kingdom) Laurence Bristow	(United Kingdom) **Andy Rouse**	(United Kingdom) Frank Sytner	None (no finishers)	(United Kingdom) Phil Dowsett
3	Thruxton Circuit, Hampshire	2 May	(United Kingdom) Steve Soper	(United Kingdom) Andy Rouse	(United Kingdom) **Steve Soper**	(United Kingdom) Frank Sytner	(United Kingdom) James Shead	(United Kingdom) Tony Crudgington
4*	Donington Park (National), Leicestershire	15 May	(United Kingdom) Andy Rouse	(United Kingdom) Win Percy (Australia) Allan Grice	(United Kingdom) **Andy Rouse** (United Kingdom) **David Sears**	(United Kingdom) Frank Sytner (United Kingdom) James Weaver	(United Kingdom) James Shead (United Kingdom) John Morris	(United Kingdom) Geoff Kimber-Smith (United Kingdom) Barbara Cowell
5	Thruxton Circuit, Hampshire	30 May	(United Kingdom) Andy Rouse	(United Kingdom) Mike Newman	(United Kingdom) **Andy Rouse**	(Austria) Roland Ratzenberger	(United Kingdom) John Brindley	(United Kingdom) Phil Dowsett
6	Silverstone Circuit (Grand Prix), Northamptonshire	5 June	(United Kingdom) Andy Rouse	(United Kingdom) Andy Rouse	(United Kingdom) **Andy Rouse**	(United Kingdom) Frank Sytner	(United Kingdom) James Shead	(United Kingdom) Phil Dowsett
7	Silverstone Circuit (Grand Prix), Northamptonshire	10 July	(United Kingdom) Andy Rouse	(United Kingdom) Andy Rouse	(United Kingdom) **Andy Rouse**	(United Kingdom) Frank Sytner	(United Kingdom) Andrew Jeffrey	(United Kingdom) Phil Dowsett
8	Brands Hatch (Grand Prix), Kent	24 July	(United Kingdom) Andy Rouse	(United Kingdom) Andy Rouse	(United Kingdom) **Andy Rouse**	(United Kingdom) Frank Sytner	(United Kingdom) Andrew Jeffrey	(United Kingdom) Phil Dowsett
9	Snetterton Motor Racing Circuit, Norfolk	31 July	(United Kingdom) Andy Rouse	(United Kingdom) Jerry Mahony	(United Kingdom) **Andy Rouse**	(United Kingdom) Frank Sytner	(United Kingdom) Andrew Jeffrey	(United Kingdom) Phil Dowsett
10	Brands Hatch (Grand Prix), Kent	21 August	(United Kingdom) Andy Rouse	(United Kingdom) Andy Rouse	(United Kingdom) **Andy Rouse**	(United Kingdom) Frank Sytner	(United Kingdom) Andrew Jeffrey	(United Kingdom) Phil Dowsett
11	Birmingham Superprix, Birmingham	29 August	(United Kingdom) Steve Soper	Race cancelled.				
12	Donington Park (National), Leicestershire	18 September	(United Kingdom) Steve Soper	(United Kingdom) Andy Rouse	(United Kingdom) **Andy Rouse**	(United Kingdom) Frank Sytner	(United Kingdom) James Shead	(United Kingdom) Phil Dowsett
13	Silverstone Circuit (Grand Prix), Northamptonshire	2 October	(United Kingdom) Andy Rouse	(Italy) Gianfranco Brancatelli	(Italy) **Gianfranco Brancatelli**	(United Kingdom) Frank Sytner	(United Kingdom) Alan Minshaw	(United Kingdom) Phil Dowsett

- 1 hour endurance race.

== Driver standings and results ==
Overall DC	Class Pos	Driver	Class	SIL	OUL	THR	DON	THR	SIL	SIL	BRH	SNE	BRH	BIR	DON	SIL	Pts
1	1	(United Kingdom) Frank Sytner	B	**4**	**6**	**5**	**7**	**13**	**11**	**8**	**7**	**9**	**8**	**C**	**11**	**7**	103
2	1	(United Kingdom) Phil Dowsett	D	**10**	**10**	18	**15**	**17**	**17**	**18**	**17**	**14**	**16**	**C**	**20**	**12**	98
3	1	(United Kingdom) Andy Rouse	A	**16**	**1**	2	**1**	**1**	**1**	**1**	**1**	**1**	**1**	C	1	**10**	95
4	2	(United Kingdom) Godfrey Hall	B	6	8	7	9	9	13	11	Ret	13	9	C	15	Ret	48
5	3	(United Kingdom) Mike Smith	B	5	14	6	Ret	14	12	Ret	8	19	12	C			40
6	2	(United Kingdom) Tony Crudgington	D	11		14	20	19	19	Ret	Ret	17	18	C	Ret	17	35
7	2	(United Kingdom) Jerry Mahony	A	1	3	3	Ret	3	8	4	5	8	3	C	9	5	33
8	1	(United Kingdom) James Shead	C	**DNS**		**13**	19	**18**	**18**	**14**	16	**16**	DNS	**C**	**19**	15	31
9	3	(United Kingdom) Mike Newman	A	2	5	19	5	4	3	6	Ret	4	4	C	4	Ret	28
10	2	(United Kingdom) Andrew Jeffery	C		**Ret**	16	**DNS**			13	**15**	15	**17**	C	22	Ret	27
11	4	(Austria) Roland Ratzenberger	B				Ret‡	8	16	Ret			11	C	13	9	26
=	4	(United Kingdom) Tim Harvey	A	Ret	4	9	2‡	5	6	7	Ret	7	2	C	Ret	2	26
=	5	(United Kingdom) Guy Edwards	A			Ret	3	11	5	2	3	3	5	C	6	4	26
14	3	(United Kingdom) Geoff Kimber-Smith	D		12	**DNS**	14	Ret	DNS	21		DNS	Ret	C	21	Ret	23
15	6	(United Kingdom) Steve Soper	A		DNA	**1**					2			**C**	**2**		21
=	7	(United Kingdom) Laurence Bristow	A	Ret	Ret	17	2	Ret	4	3	4	Ret	Ret	C	14	3	21
17	4	(United Kingdom) John Llewellyn	D							Ret	20	18	19	C	23	16	20
18	5	(United Kingdom) Barbara Cowell	D				14‡				19	Ret	Ret	DNQ	DNQ	18	17
19	5	(United Kingdom) Will Hoy	B				Ret‡				9	10				8	16
20	6	(United Kingdom) James Weaver	B		DNS		7‡							C	12		15
=	7	(United Kingdom) Alan Minshaw	B	7	7	8	Ret				21						15
22	8	(United Kingdom) Robb Gravett	A			Ret	10	15	2	5	11	2	Ret	C			14
23	9	(Italy) Gianfranco Brancatelli	A													1	10
=	10	(United Kingdom) Mike O'Brien	A	Ret	2	4	8	6	10	12	10	DSQ	13	DNQ	10	Ret	10
25	11	(United Kingdom) David Sears	A				1‡										9
=	3	(United Kingdom) John Brindley	C			15	Ret	16	DNS								9
27	4	(United Kingdom) Alan Minshaw	C											C	Ret	**13**	8
=	12	(United Kingdom) Karl Jones	A		Ret	10	Ret	2	9	10	6	6	Ret	C	7	DNS	9
=	8	(United Kingdom) Lionel Wiffen	B	13	Ret	DNS	18	Ret					20	DNQ		19	9
30	6	(United Kingdom) Mark Hales	D		11		21		DNS								8
=	7	(United Kingdom) Kevin Eaton	D	Ret	15		16										8
=	9	(United Kingdom) Dave Wallis	B	12	Ret	12	17										8
34	10	(United Kingdom) Barrie Williams	B				9‡										7
=	13	(United Kingdom) Chris Hodgetts	A	8	Ret		Ret	12	Ret				7	C	3	DNS	7
35	8	(United Kingdom) Mark Goddard	D							Ret	Ret		DNS			14	6
=	9	(United Kingdom) Tiff Needell	D				15‡										6
37	10	(United Kingdom) David Loudon	D							20							6
=	11	(United Kingdom) Lionel Abbott	B				17‡						Ret		16		6
39	14	(United Kingdom) Bob Sands	A	3	Ret	Ret	6										5
=	15	(United Kingdom) Graham Goode	A	Ret	Ret	11	Ret	7	7	9	13	5	6	C	5	Ret	5
41	5	(United Kingdom) John Morris	C				19‡				DNS						5
=	11	(United Kingdom) Alex Moss	D				16‡										5
43	16	(United Kingdom) Johnny Dumfries	A				3‡										4
=	12	(United Kingdom) Richard Belcher	D	14													4
=	17	(United Kingdom) Win Percy	A				4										4
=	18	(Australia) Allan Grice	A				4‡										4
47	6	(United Kingdom) Andy Middlehurst	C							15							3
=	7	(United Kingdom) Martin Wray	C								22						3
=	19	(Switzerland) Peter Buxtorf	A	9	9	Ret	12										3
=	12	(United Kingdom) Robin Parsons	B				18‡										3
=	13	(United Kingdom) Alistair Davidson	D				20‡										3
=	14	(United Kingdom) Jeremy Rossiter	D							22							3
=	15	(United Kingdom) Vic Lee	D			NC											3
54	20	(United Kingdom) Rob Speak	A				5‡										2
=	16	(United Kingdom) Patrick Watts	D				21‡										2
56	22	(United Kingdom) Dave Brodie	A												DNS	6	1
=	21	(United Kingdom) Richard Jones	A				6‡										1
=	8	(United Kingdom) James Kaye	C	15	Ret												1
=	13	(United Kingdom) David Sears	B												Ret	Ret	1
60	23	(United Kingdom) Sean Brown	A				8‡										0
=	24	(United Kingdom) Graham Hathaway	A	Ret	13	DNS	13	10	15	16		Ret	10	C	8	11	0
=	25	(United Kingdom) Gary Ayles	A				10‡										0
=	26	(United Kingdom) Dennis Leech	A			Ret	11	Ret	14	17	12						0
=	27	(United Kingdom) David Carvell	A				11‡										0
=	28	(United Kingdom) Mark Hales	A				Ret‡			Ret	NC	11		DNQ	18	Ret	0
=	29	(United Kingdom) Ian Flux	A				Ret‡						14			Ret	0
=	30	(United Kingdom) Tom Bell	A									12	DNS			Ret	0
=	31	(United Kingdom) Barry Robinson	A				12‡										0
=	32	(United Kingdom) Peter Townsend	A				13‡										0
=	33	(United Kingdom) Nick May	A				Ret	21			14		Ret	DNQ	24	DNS	0
=	34	(United Kingdom) Vic Lee	A				Ret‡	20	Ret	Ret	18	Ret	15				0
=	35	(United Kingdom) Ray MacDowall	A								Ret				17		0
=	36	(United Kingdom) John Lepp	A				Ret‡		DNS	19							0
		(United Kingdom) Pete Hall	A	Ret	Ret												0
		(United Kingdom) Jon Dooley	B												DNQ	Ret	0
		(United Kingdom) Alistair Lyall	A				Ret‡										0
		(United Kingdom) John Llewellyn	C				Ret‡										0
		(United Kingdom) Rob Wilson	A								Ret						0
		(United Kingdom) Chris Hodgetts	B									Ret					0
		(United Kingdom) John Clark	C				DNS‡										0
		(United Kingdom) Tom Walkinshaw	A											C			0
		(United Kingdom) Nick Whale	D											C			0
Overall DC	Class Pos	Driver	Class	SIL	OUL	THR	DON	THR	SIL	SIL	BRH	SNE	BRH	BIR	DON	SIL	Pts

Colour	Result
Gold	Winner
Silver	Second place
Bronze	Third place
Green	Points classification
Blue	Non-points classification
Blue	Non-classified finish (NC)
Purple	Retired, not classified (Ret)
Red	Did not qualify (DNQ)
Red	Did not pre-qualify (DNPQ)
Black	Disqualified (DSQ)
White	Did not start (DNS)
White	Withdrew (WD)
White	Race cancelled (C)
Blank	Did not practice (DNP)
Blank	Did not arrive (DNA)
Blank	Excluded (EX)

- Note: **bold** signifies pole position, italics signifies fastest lap in class (1 point given all races).

‡ Endurance driver

== Championship results ==
Driver's championship
Pos.	Driver	Car	Class	Points
1	(United Kingdom) Frank Sytner	BMW M3	B	103
2	(United Kingdom) Phil Dowsett	Toyota Corolla GT	D	98
3	(United Kingdom) Andy Rouse	Ford Sierra RS500	A	95
4	(United Kingdom) Godfrey Hall	BMW M3	B	48
5	(United Kingdom) Mike Smith	BMW M3	B	40
6	(United Kingdom) Tony Crudgington	Toyota Corolla GT	D	35
7	(United Kingdom) Jerry Mahony	Ford Sierra RS500	A	33
8	(United Kingdom) James Shead	Volkswagen Golf GTI	C	31
