= 1983 British Saloon Car Championship =

26th season of the British Touring Car Championship

Seasons
- ← 1982 1984 →

The 1983 RAC Trimoco British Saloon Car Championship was the 26th season of the championship. Steve Soper driving a works Rover SD1 built by TWR was initially champion, but after he and the team was disqualified on a technicality, Andy Rouse won his second drivers title in an Alfa Romeo GTV6.

== Season overview ==
The sporting regulations changed to FIA sanctioned Group A specification, and three different classes competed for honours. TWR expanded their team and ran a trio of Rover Vitesses for Pete Lovett, Jeff Allam and Steve Soper. Austin Rover would also back Roger Dowson Engineering who ran Turbo Metros in Class B whilst Ford supported a semi-works Ford Escort outfit in Class C. GM/Opel entered a single Opel Monza for Tony Lanfranchi. Reigning champion Win Percy would once again drive for Toyota, this time at the wheel of a Supra. Meanwhile, Frank Sytner raced for the works BMW team.

TWR dominated the season, winning all 11 races. The drivers had the races pretty much their own way until Sytner, who had fallen out with Walkinshaw and left TWR the previous season, protested the legality of the Rover cars to the governing body. In response, Walkinshaw protested Sytner's BMW which led to extended legal wrangling which would drag on until long after the season was over.

Soper beat his more experienced team mates and won the outright championship, while Andy Rouse who had taken over the Alfa Romeo GTV6 run by Pete Hall won Class B after a season long dice with the Metros. In Class C, Alan Minshaw took the class honours in his Volkswagen Golf, seeing off the Ford challenge.

However, six months after the championship was over, Sytner's protest was heard by a Tribunal of Enquiry, chaired by veteran legal counsel Lord Hartley Shawcross. The result was the RAC disqualified the Rover team entirely over bodywork irregularities and engine installation issues, handing the title to Rouse. In response, Austin Rover withdrew from the BSCC immediately as a works outfit to concentrate on competing in Europe, and would not return until 2001 under the guise of MG Rover.

== Teams and drivers ==
Team	Car	No.	Drivers	Rounds
Class A
Hughes of Beaconsfield/Toyota GB	Toyota Celica Supra	1	(United Kingdom) Win Percy^{1}	4–5, 8–11
Team Sanyo Racing with Esso; Hepolite Glacier Racing with Esso	Rover Vitesse	2	(United Kingdom) Jeff Allam	All
Team Sanyo Racing with Esso; Hepolite Glacier Racing with Esso	Rover Vitesse	3	(United Kingdom) Pete Lovett	All
Team Sanyo Racing with Esso; Hepolite Glacier Racing with Esso	Rover Vitesse	4	(United Kingdom) Steve Soper	1–4, 6–11
Gordon Spice Racing	Rover Vitesse	5	(United Kingdom) Gordon Spice	6, 8–10
Dennis Leech	Rover Vitesse	6	(United Kingdom) Dennis Leech	4–8
Burlington Wallcoverings Ltd.	Ford Capri III 3.0S	9	(United Kingdom) Mike Newman	1–2, 7–10
Equipe Esso/Daily Mirror	Rover Vitesse	10	(United Kingdom) Charles Sawyer-Hoare	All
GM Dealer Sport	Opel Monza 3.0E	11	(United Kingdom) Tony Lanfranchi	1–3, 5–11
Graham Goode Racing	Ford Capri III 3.0S	12	(United Kingdom) Graham Goode	1, 5, 7–8
Mark Hales	Ford Capri III 3.0S	16	(United Kingdom) Mark Hales	8
Team Colt Cars Mid-West	Mitsubishi Starion Turbo	18	(United Kingdom) Dave Brodie	6–11
Grace International Racing	BMW 635CSi	19	(United Kingdom) Frank Sytner	6–9, 11
Cheylesmore BMW Motorsport	BMW 635CSi	20	(West Germany) Hans-Joachim Stuck	8–10
Cheylesmore BMW Motorsport	BMW 635CSi	20	(United Kingdom) Jonathan Palmer	11
Brian Chatfield	Ford Capri III 3.0S	29	(United Kingdom) Brian Chatfield	10–11
Class B
Hamish Irvine	Mazda RX-7	30	(United Kingdom) Hamish Irvine	1–5, 7–11
Napolina Alfa Romeo Dealer Team; Napolina Alfa Romeo Dealer Team with Hampshires of Dorking	Alfa Romeo GTV6	31	(United Kingdom) Jon Dooley	All
Terry Nightingale	Mazda RX-7	32	(United Kingdom) Terry Nightingale	8
Industrial Control Services Ltd.	Alfa Romeo GTV6	34	(United Kingdom) Pete Hall	1–3
Industrial Control Services Ltd.	Alfa Romeo GTV6	34	(United Kingdom) Andy Rouse	4–11
Unipart with Daily Express	MG Metro Turbo	35	(United Kingdom) Tony Pond	4–11
Unipart with Daily Express	MG Metro Turbo	36	(United Kingdom) Patrick Watts	8–11
Unipart with Daily Express	MG Metro Turbo	37	(United Kingdom) Martin Brundle	11
Tom Dodd-Noble	Mazda RX-7	?	(United Kingdom) Tom Dodd-Noble	4
Class C
Volkswagen Sport	Volkswagen Scirocco GTI	60	(United Kingdom) John Morris	All
Royal Mail Datapost	Ford Escort RS1600i	66	(United Kingdom) Alan Curnow	All
Royal Mail Datapost	Ford Escort RS1600i	77	(United Kingdom) Richard Longman	All
Ordibel UK Ltd.	Volkswagen Golf GTI	67	(United Kingdom) Alan Greenhalgh	1–5, 7–8, 10
Brooklyn Motorsport	Ford Escort RS1600i	69	(United Kingdom) Chris Hodgetts	All
Julian May Racing	Ford Fiesta XR2	70	(United Kingdom) Jock Robertson	1–4
Julian May Racing	Ford Escort RS1600i	70	(United Kingdom) Jock Robertson	6–9, 11
Lloyds of Stafford	Ford Escort RS1600i	72	(United Kingdom) Rob Hall	All
Lionel Abbott	Ford Escort RS1600i	74	(United Kingdom) Lionel Abbott	2–5, 7
Unipart with Daily Express	MG Metro	78	(United Kingdom) Patrick Watts	2–7
Hughes of Beaconsfield/Toyota GB	Toyota Corolla GT	80	(United Kingdom) Win Percy^{1}	1
Tony Crudgington	Ford Fiesta XR2	82	(United Kingdom) Tony Crudgington	8
Napolina Alfa Romeo Dealer Team; Napolina Alfa Romeo Dealer Team with Hampshires of Dorking	Alfa Romeo Alfasud Ti	83	(United Kingdom) Rob Kirby	All
Napolina Alfa Romeo Dealer Team; Napolina Alfa Romeo Dealer Team with Hampshires of Dorking	Alfa Romeo Alfasud Ti	84	(United Kingdom) Andrew Thorpe	All
Demon Tweeks Racing	Volkswagen Golf GTI	86	(United Kingdom) Alan Minshaw	All
RZ Racing	Toyota Corolla GT	87	(United Kingdom) Andy Driver	3
RZ Racing	Toyota Corolla GT	87	(United Kingdom) Tony Crudgington	5
RZ Racing	Toyota Corolla GT	87	(United Kingdom) Geoff Kimber-Smith	6–11
Terry Watts	Talbot Sunbeam Ti	88	(United Kingdom) Terry Watts	8–9
Jenny Birrell	Toyota Corolla GT	95	(United Kingdom) Jenny Birrell	11
GTI Engineering	Volkswagen Golf GTI	100	(United Kingdom) Richard Lloyd	11

Notes:

1. – Win Percy was ineligible for points at round 4.

== Calendar and winners ==
Overall winners in **bold**.

Round	Circuit	Date	Class A winner	Class B winner	Class C winner
1	Silverstone Circuit, Northamptonshire	20 March	(United Kingdom) **Steve Soper**	(United Kingdom) Hamish Irvine	(United Kingdom) Win Percy
2	Oulton Park, Cheshire	1 April	(United Kingdom) **Jeff Allam**	(United Kingdom) Jon Dooley	(United Kingdom) John Morris
3	Thruxton Circuit, Hampshire	4 April	(United Kingdom) **Pete Lovett**	(United Kingdom) Jon Dooley	(United Kingdom) Alan Greenhalgh
4	Brands Hatch, Kent	10 April	(United Kingdom) **Steve Soper**	(United Kingdom) Andy Rouse	(United Kingdom) Alan Curnow
5	Thruxton Circuit, Hampshire	30 May	(United Kingdom) **Pete Lovett**	(United Kingdom) Andy Rouse	(United Kingdom) Alan Curnow
6	Silverstone Circuit, Northamptonshire	12 June	(United Kingdom) **Steve Soper**	(United Kingdom) Andy Rouse	(United Kingdom) Chris Hodgetts
7	Donington Park, Leicestershire	25 June	(United Kingdom) **Pete Lovett**	(United Kingdom) Andy Rouse	(United Kingdom) John Morris
8	Silverstone Circuit, Northamptonshire	16 July	(United Kingdom) **Steve Soper**	(United Kingdom) Jon Dooley	(United Kingdom) Richard Longman
9	Donington Park, Leicestershire	14 August	(United Kingdom) **Steve Soper**	(United Kingdom) Tony Pond	(United Kingdom) Alan Minshaw
10	Brands Hatch, Kent	29 August	(United Kingdom) **Pete Lovett**	(United Kingdom) Andy Rouse	(United Kingdom) Chris Hodgetts
11	Silverstone Circuit, Northamptonshire	2 October	(United Kingdom) **Jeff Allam**	(United Kingdom) Andy Rouse	(United Kingdom) Chris Hodgetts

== Championship standings ==
=== Drivers' championship ===
Points were awarded on a 9, 6, 4, 3, 2, 1 basis to the top six finishers in each class, with one bonus point for the fastest lap in each class. In races where a class had less than four starters, points would be awarded to the top two finishers (6 & 4 respectively) with one point for the fastest lap. A driver's best nine scores counted towards the championship, dropped scores are shown in brackets. Positions are shown as overall/class.

Pos	Driver	Class	SIL	OUL	THR	BRA	THR	SIL	DON	SIL	DON	BRA	SIL	Pts
**DSQ**	(United Kingdom) Steve Soper	A	**1/1**	**3/3**	**7/5**	**1/1**		1/1	Ret	1/1	1/1	**2/2**	2/2	**68**
**DSQ**	(United Kingdom) Pete Lovett	A	3/3	2/2	1/1	Ret	**1/1**	2/2	1/1	**2/2**	Ret	1/1	4/4	**63**
1	(United Kingdom) Andy Rouse	B				**3/1**	**4/1**	**5/1**	4/1	Ret	7/2	8/1	7/1	61
**DSQ**	(United Kingdom) Jeff Allam	A	2/2	1/1	2/2	2/2	2/2	**Ret**	**Ret**	3/3	Ret	4/4	**1/1**	**53**
2	(United Kingdom) Alan Minshaw	C	(11/5)	12/4	11/3	10/2	11/3	9/3	12/3	12/2	8/1	14/4	(Ret)	45
3	(United Kingdom) Chris Hodgetts	C	13/7	14/6	13/5	Ret	12/4	7/1	Ret	**13/3**	9/2	11/1	10/1	43
4	(United Kingdom) Alan Curnow	C	9/3	?/?	Ret	9/1	**8/1**	Ret	13/4	14/4	12/4	13/3	11/2	42
5	(United Kingdom) Hamish Irvine	B	8/1	**6/2**	5/2	5/2	7/3		6/3	20/2	Ret	9/2	Ret	42
6	(United Kingdom) Jon Dooley	B	**Ret**	4/1	**4/1**	6/3	Ret	Ret	Ret	10/1	Ret	18/3	9/2	36
7	(United Kingdom) Richard Longman	C	14/8	9/2	**16/8**	13/5	10/2	Ret	Ret	11/1	11/3	16/6	12/3	35
8	(United Kingdom) John Morris	C	**Ret**	**8/1**	15/7	**11/3**	Ret	**8/2**	**10/1**	Ret	**Ret**	17/7	**16/7**	31
9	(United Kingdom) Tony Pond	B				Ret	6/2	Ret	**5/2**	25/5	**6/1**	**Ret**	17/3	31
10	(United Kingdom) Rob Hall	C	10/4	10/3	Ret	Ret	Ret	Ret	11/2	15/5	Ret	**12/2**	Ret	22
11	(United Kingdom) Rob Kirby	C	Ret	13/5	10/2	12/4	DNS	11/5	14/5	17/6	13/5	Ret	Ret	18
12	(United Kingdom) Alan Greenhalgh	C	7/2	?/?	9/1	15/7	15/7		17/7	Ret		15/5		17
13	(United Kingdom) Tony Lanfranchi	A	Ret	5/4	6/4		9/5	6/5	3/3	7/7	10/6	6/6	6/6	17
14	(United Kingdom) Charles Sawyer-Hoare	A	4/4	DNS	3/3	Ret	3/3	4/4	8/5	8/8	Ret	7/7	Ret	16
15	(West Germany) Hans-Joachim Stuck	A								5/5	**2/2**	3/3		12
16	(United Kingdom) Frank Sytner	A						3/3	2/2	DSQ	Ret		Ret	10
17	(United Kingdom) Win Percy	C	6/1											9
18	(United Kingdom) Patrick Watts	C		?/?	12/4	14/6	13/5	10/4	Ret					9
19	(United Kingdom) Mike Newman	A	5/5	11/5					7/4	9/9	5/5	DNS		9
20	(United Kingdom) Patrick Watts	B								**21/3**	Ret	Ret	18/4	7
21	(United Kingdom) Win Percy	A				8/4	DNS			6/6	3/3	Ret	Ret	5
22	(United Kingdom) Dennis Leech	A				4/3	Ret	Ret	9/6	Ret				5
23	(United Kingdom) Andrew Thorpe	C	NC	?/?	14/6	16/8	Ret	12/6	Ret	18/7	14/6	Ret	14/5	5
24	(United Kingdom) Gordon Spice	A						Ret		23/12	4/4	5/5		5
25	(United Kingdom) Dave Brodie	A						Ret	16/7	16/10	Ret	Ret	3/3	4
26	(United Kingdom) Graham Goode	A	Ret				5/4		Ret	Ret				3
27	(United Kingdom) Tom Dodd-Noble	B				7/4								3
28	(United Kingdom) Richard Lloyd	C											13/4	3
29	(United Kingdom) Terry Nightingale	B								22/4				3
30	(United Kingdom) Jonathan Palmer	A											5/5	2
31	(United Kingdom) Martin Brundle	B											**19/5**	2
32	(United Kingdom) Jock Robertson	C	12/6	?/?	Ret	Ret		WD	DNS	Ret	Ret		15/6	2
33	(United Kingdom) Lionel Abbott	C		DNS	Ret	DNS	14/6		15/6					2
34	(United Kingdom) Pete Hall	B	Ret	7/3	8/3									0
35	(United Kingdom) Geoff Kimber-Smith	C						13/7	18/8	DNS	15/7	Ret	Ret	0
36	(United Kingdom) Brian Chatfield	A										10/8	8/7	0
37	(United Kingdom) Terry Watts	C								24/8	Ret			0
38	(United Kingdom) Mark Hales	A								19/11				0
NC	(United Kingdom) Tony Crudgington	C					Ret			Ret				0
NC	(United Kingdom) Andy Driver	C			DNS									0
NC	(United Kingdom) Jenny Birrell	C											DNS	0
Pos	Driver	Class	SIL	OUL	THR	BRA	THR	SIL	DON	SIL	DON	BRA	SIL	Pts

Colour	Result
Gold	Winner
Silver	Second place
Bronze	Third place
Green	Points classification
Blue	Non-points classification
Blue	Non-classified finish (NC)
Purple	Retired, not classified (Ret)
Red	Did not qualify (DNQ)
Red	Did not pre-qualify (DNPQ)
Black	Disqualified (DSQ)
White	Did not start (DNS)
White	Withdrew (WD)
White	Race cancelled (C)
Blank	Did not practice (DNP)
Blank	Did not arrive (DNA)
Blank	Excluded (EX)

**Bold** - Pole in class
Italics - Fastest lap in class
