= Barbara Cowell =

British former racing driver

- Born: 1958 (age 67–68)
- Other name: Barbara Babbage (nee Cowell)
- Occupation: Former racing driver
- Years active: 1973–1993
- Known for: one of the first female members of the British Racing Drivers' Club

Barbara Babbage (nee Cowell) (born 1958) is a British former racing driver.

Cowell is one of the first female members of the British Racing Drivers' Club.

== Career ==
=== Mini-rod racing ===
Cowell started racing in Mini-rods at Long Eaton in 1973 and was British Champion in 1978. She won the British, European and World Titles in 1981.

=== Tin-tops ===
==== Mini 7 Racing ====
Cowell raced in the Mini 7 Championship from 1982 to 1984.

==== Production Saloons ====
Cowell drove a Gerry Marshall-prepared Fiat Strada in the Uniroyal Production Saloon Car Championship in 1985 and switched to a Vauxhall Astra for 1986.

Cowell won the Class D title in the 1987 Season, with six class wins, driving a Suzuki Swift.

For the 1988 season, Cowell switched to a Class B BMW M3. She won her class at Castle Combe.

==== MG Metro Turbo Challenge ====
Cowell raced in the 1987 ESSO MG Metro Challenge.

Cowell's car (#18) was memorably used for a press release featuring future F1 World Champion Damon Hill.

==== World Touring Car Championship ====
Cowell drove a Toyota Corolla in the 1987 RAC Tourist Trophy, sharing with Geoff Kimber-Smith, but they didn't finish. They entered the Tourist Trophy again in 1988 but did not race.

==== British Touring Car Championship ====
Cowell raced in the 1988 British Touring Car Championship. She won Class D in the Donington 1 Hour Endurance race in a Toyota Corolla, sharing with Kimber-Smith.

Cowell switched to a Ford Escort (still in Class D), run by North Essex Motorsport, from Brands Hatch onwards. She came second in her class there and this would remain her best result.

Cowell's sole outing in the 1989 British Touring Car Championship would be the Endurance race at Donington, once again sharing a Toyota Corolla with Geoff Kimber-Smith. A misfire forced them to retire after four laps.

==== Willhire 24 Hours ====
Barbara finished fourth in the 1993 Willhire 24 Hour race at Snetterton. She formed part of an all-female team with Clare Redgrave and Kirsten Kolby, driving a Honda Civic.
