= 1989 British Touring Car Championship =

32nd season of the British Touring Car Championship

Seasons
- ← 1988 1990 →

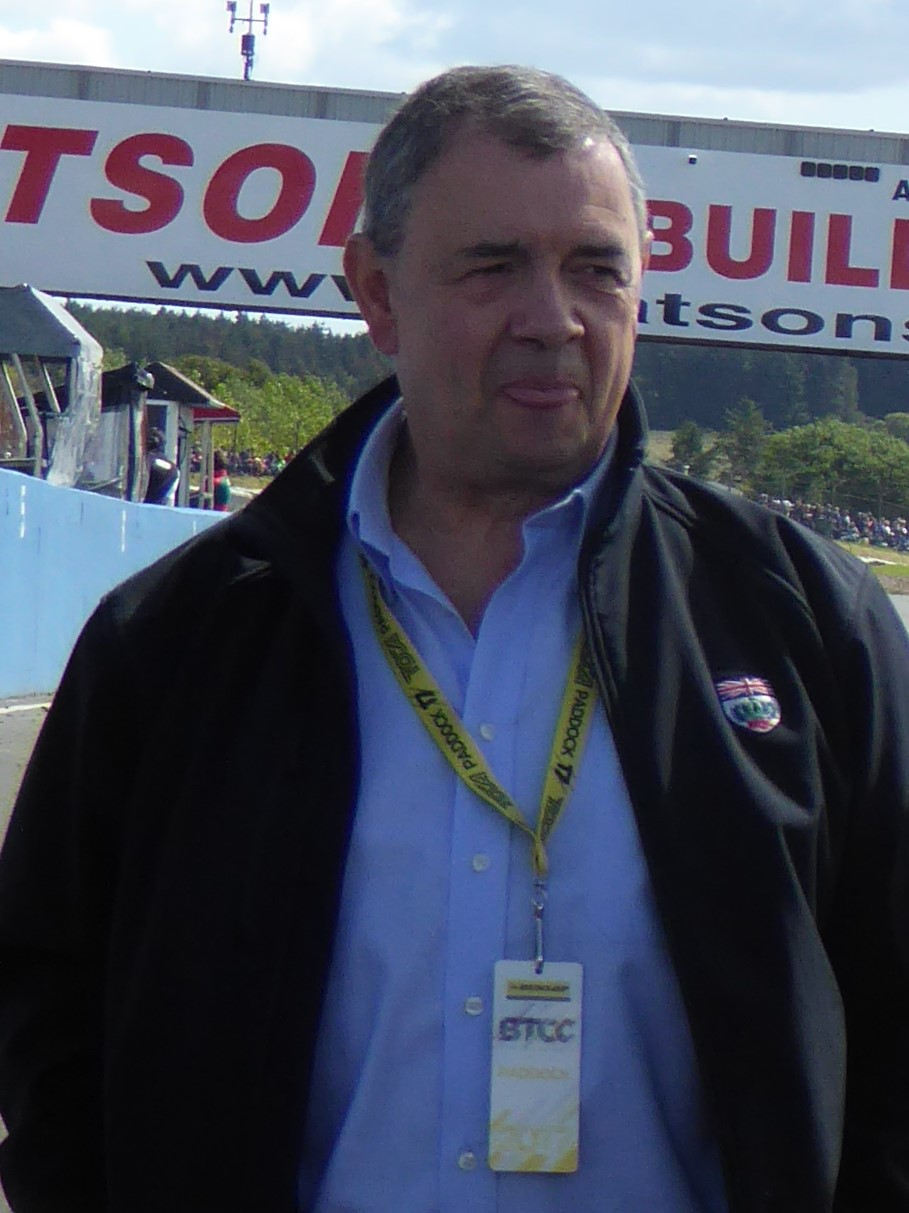
1989 BTCC champion, John Cleland

The 1989 Esso RAC British Touring Car Championship was the 32nd season of the championship. This season was the final year of the four separate class format, with the championship changing to just two classes for 1990. There were a total of thirteen rounds with the best eleven scores for each driver counting towards the championship. The title was won by John Cleland with a works Vauxhall Astra GTE 16V.

== Teams & Drivers ==
Team	Car	No.	Drivers	Rounds	Endurance drivers
Class A
Kaliber Racing	Ford Sierra RS500	1	(United Kingdom) Andy Rouse	All	(United Kingdom) Win Percy
Kaliber Racing	Ford Sierra RS500	10	(United Kingdom) Guy Edwards	1-11, 13	(United Kingdom) Johnny Dumfries Win Percy^{1}
Kaliber Racing	Ford Sierra RS500	10	(United Kingdom) David Sears	12	(United Kingdom) Johnny Dumfries Win Percy^{1}
Arquati Racing Team	Ford Sierra RS500	2	(United Kingdom) Jerry Mahony	All	(United Kingdom) Gary Ayles
Listerine Racing Team	Ford Sierra RS500	3	(United Kingdom) Mike Newman	All	(United Kingdom) Alistair Lyall
Listerine Racing Team	Ford Sierra RS500	4	(United Kingdom) Graham Goode	All	(United Kingdom) Alistair Lyall
FAI Auto Parts	Ford Sierra RS500	5	(United Kingdom) Sean Walker	All	(United Kingdom) Damon Hill
Labatt's Team	Ford Sierra RS500	6	(United Kingdom) Laurence Bristow	All	(United Kingdom) Tiff Needell
Labatt's Team	Ford Sierra RS500	7	(United Kingdom) Tim Harvey	1-9, 11-13	(United Kingdom) David Sears
Labatt's Team	Ford Sierra RS500	7	(Australia) Tomas Mezera	10	(United Kingdom) David Sears
Mark Rennison	Ford Sierra RS500	9	(United Kingdom) Mark Rennison	3, 5-6	
Graham Hathaway Racing	Ford Sierra RS500	14	(United Kingdom) Graham Hathaway	1, 4-5, 10, 12	(United Kingdom) Dave Wallis
Brooklyn Motorsport	Ford Sierra RS500	15	(United Kingdom) Chris Hodgetts	1-7, 11-12	(United Kingdom) David Leslie
Terry Drury Racing	Ford Sierra RS500	16	(United Kingdom) Dave Pinkney	1-10	(United Kingdom) Graham Scarborough
Terry Drury Racing	Ford Sierra RS500	16	(United Kingdom) Jon Dooley	13	(United Kingdom) Graham Scarborough
Terry Drury Racing	Ford Sierra RS500	17	(United Kingdom) Mike O'Brien	1-3, 5-13	
Terry Drury Racing	Ford Sierra RS500	18	(United Kingdom) Robin Donovan	1-9	(United Kingdom) Mike O'Brien
Terry Drury Racing	Ford Sierra RS500	18	(United Kingdom) Andrew Hepworth	13	(United Kingdom) Mike O'Brien
Brodie-Brittain Racing	Ford Sierra RS500	19	(United Kingdom) Dave Brodie	1-6, 8-10, 12-13	(United Kingdom) Andrew Gilbert-Scott
Trakstar Motorsport	Ford Sierra RS500	20	(United Kingdom) Mike Smith	1-8, 10-13	(United Kingdom) Mike Wilds
Trakstar Motorsport	Ford Sierra RS500	20	(United Kingdom) Will Hoy	9	(United Kingdom) Mike Wilds
Trakstar Motorsport	Ford Sierra RS500	21	(United Kingdom) Robb Gravett	All	(United Kingdom) Jeff Allam
Bornebusch Racing	Ford Sierra RS500	22	(Sweden) Kaj Bornebusch	1-2	
JQF Engineering	Ford Sierra RS500	25	(Netherlands) Gerrit van Kouwen	1-11	(Belgium) Pierre Dieudonné
JQF Engineering	Ford Sierra RS500	25	(Australia) Tomas Mezera	12	(Belgium) Pierre Dieudonné
JQF Engineering	Ford Sierra RS500	25	(United Kingdom) Chris Hodgetts	13	(Belgium) Pierre Dieudonné
Trident Motorsport	Maserati Biturbo	26	(Australia) Tomas Mezera	3, 6	
Trident Motorsport	Maserati Biturbo	26	(United Kingdom) Nick May	5, 7-8, 10-11, 13	
Trident Motorsport	Maserati Biturbo	26	(United Kingdom) John Lepp	9	
Trident Motorsport	Maserati Biturbo	26	(United Kingdom) Vic Lee	12	
Asquith Autosport	Ford Sierra RS500	28	(United Kingdom) Karl Jones	All	(United Kingdom) Vic Lee
Class B
Demon Tweeks	BMW M3	30	(United Kingdom) James Kaye	1	
Demon Tweeks	BMW M3	30	(United Kingdom) Barrie Williams	7	
Demon Tweeks	BMW M3	30	(United Kingdom) Alan Minshaw	11-12	
John Maguire Racing	BMW M3	31	(United Kingdom) John Clark	1-4, 6-11, 13	(United Kingdom) Andrew Jeffrey
John Maguire Racing	BMW M3	43	(United Kingdom) Godfrey Hall	1-8, 10-13	(United Kingdom) Lionel Abbott
BMW Team Finance	BMW M3	32	(United Kingdom) James Weaver	All	(United Kingdom) Steve Soper
BMW Team Finance	BMW M3	33	(United Kingdom) Frank Sytner	All	(United Kingdom) Will Hoy
Ian Forrest	BMW M3	35	(United Kingdom) Ian Forrest	All	(United Kingdom) Bernard Hunter
Nettan Lindgren	BMW M3	37	(Sweden) Nettan Lindgren	1-2, 7-11	
BRR Motorsport	BMW M3	44	(United Kingdom) John Llewellyn	All	(United Kingdom) Gerry Marshall
Class C
Demon Tweeks	Volkswagen Golf GTI	50	(United Kingdom) Alan Minshaw	1-10	(United Kingdom) John Brindley
Team Eurotech	Peugeot 309 GTi	53	(United Kingdom) Mike Jordan	1-4, 7, 11	(United Kingdom) Peter Tyson
John Morris	Volkswagen Golf GTI	55	(United Kingdom) John Morris	1, 3-8, 10-13	(United Kingdom) Barrie Williams
Vauxhall Motorsport	Vauxhall Astra GTE 16v	56	(United Kingdom) John Cleland	All	(United Kingdom) Ian Flux
Vauxhall Motorsport	Vauxhall Astra GTE 16v	57	(United Kingdom) Jeremy Rossiter	7-13	
Vauxhall Motorsport	Vauxhall Astra GTE 16v	58	(United Kingdom) Louise Aitken-Walker	2-13	(United Kingdom) Vince Woodman
Monorep	Vauxhall Astra GTE 16v	63	(United Kingdom) Tony Lanfranchi	10, 12-13	
Class D
Phil Dowsett	Toyota Corolla FX GT	70	(United Kingdom) Phil Dowsett	1-2, 4-7,	(United Kingdom) Mark Goddard
Rayscar	Toyota Corolla FX GT	70	(United Kingdom) Phil Dowsett	10-11	(United Kingdom) Mark Goddard
PG Tags Racing	Honda Civic Si	75	(United Kingdom) Ray Armes	7-13	
Five Star Racing	Toyota Corolla GT	77	(United Kingdom) Geoff Kimber-Smith	1-5, 7-13	(United Kingdom) Barbara Cowell
Five Star Racing	Toyota Corolla GT	77	(United Kingdom) Mark Goddard	6	(United Kingdom) Barbara Cowell
Tony Dolley	Toyota Corolla FX GT	81	(United Kingdom) Tony Dolley	1-3, 5-7, 10-13	
Les Liddiard	Toyota Corolla FX GT	85	(United Kingdom) Les Liddiard	2-7, 10-13	(United Kingdom) Steve King
Tony Crudgington	Toyota Corolla GT	88	(United Kingdom) Tony Crudgington	2-13	(United Kingdom) Chuck Nicholson

^{1}Drove car illegally.

== Calendar ==
All races were held in the United Kingdom. Overall winners in **bold**.

Round	Circuit	Date	Pole position	Fastest lap	Class A winner	Class B winner	Class C Winner	Class D Winner
1	Oulton Park (International), Cheshire	24 March	(United Kingdom) Andy Rouse	(United Kingdom) Robb Gravett	(United Kingdom) **Robb Gravett**	(United Kingdom) James Weaver	(United Kingdom) John Cleland	(United Kingdom) Geoff Kimber-Smith
2	Silverstone Circuit (Grand Prix), Northamptonshire	9 April	(United Kingdom) Andy Rouse	(United Kingdom) Robb Gravett	(United Kingdom) **Andy Rouse**	(United Kingdom) James Weaver	(United Kingdom) John Cleland	(United Kingdom) Phil Dowsett
3	Thruxton Circuit, Hampshire	1 May	(United Kingdom) Andy Rouse	(United Kingdom) Andy Rouse	(United Kingdom) **Tim Harvey**	(United Kingdom) Frank Sytner	(United Kingdom) Louise Aitken-Walker	(United Kingdom) Phil Dowsett
4*	Donington Park (National), Leicestershire	7 May	(United Kingdom) Robb Gravett	(United Kingdom) Robb Gravett	(United Kingdom) **Laurence Bristow** **Tiff Needell**	(United Kingdom) Frank Sytner Will Hoy	(United Kingdom) John Cleland Ian Flux	(United Kingdom) Phil Dowsett Mark Goddard
5	Thruxton Circuit, Hampshire	29 May	(United Kingdom) Dave Brodie	(United Kingdom) Robb Gravett	(United Kingdom) **Andy Rouse**	(United Kingdom) James Weaver	(United Kingdom) John Cleland	(United Kingdom) Tony Crudgington
6	Silverstone Circuit (National), Northamptonshire	4 June	(United Kingdom) Andy Rouse	(United Kingdom) Robb Gravett	(United Kingdom) **Robb Gravett**	(United Kingdom) James Weaver	(United Kingdom) Louise Aitken-Walker	(United Kingdom) Phil Dowsett
7	Silverstone Circuit (Grand Prix), Northamptonshire	16 July	(United Kingdom) Andy Rouse	(United Kingdom) Andy Rouse	(United Kingdom) **Andy Rouse**	(United Kingdom) James Weaver	(United Kingdom) John Cleland	(United Kingdom) Ray Armes
8	Brands Hatch (Grand Prix), Kent	23 July	(United Kingdom) Robb Gravett	(United Kingdom) Robb Gravett	(United Kingdom) **Robb Gravett**	(United Kingdom) James Weaver	(United Kingdom) John Cleland	(United Kingdom) Ray Armes
9	Snetterton Motor Racing Circuit, Norfolk	6 August	(United Kingdom) Robb Gravett	(United Kingdom) Robb Gravett	(United Kingdom) **Robb Gravett**	(United Kingdom) James Weaver	(United Kingdom) John Cleland	(United Kingdom) Ray Armes
10	Brands Hatch (Grand Prix), Kent	20 August	(United Kingdom) Andy Rouse	(United Kingdom) Andy Rouse	(United Kingdom) **Andy Rouse**	(United Kingdom) James Weaver	(United Kingdom) John Cleland	(United Kingdom) Phil Dowsett
11	Birmingham Superprix, Birmingham	28 August	(United Kingdom) Robb Gravett	(United Kingdom) Andy Rouse	(United Kingdom) **Andy Rouse**	(United Kingdom) James Weaver	(United Kingdom) John Cleland	(United Kingdom) Geoff Kimber-Smith
12	Donington Park (Grand Prix), Leicestershire	17 September	(United Kingdom) Robb Gravett	(United Kingdom) Robb Gravett	(United Kingdom) **Tim Harvey**	(United Kingdom) James Weaver	(United Kingdom) John Cleland	(United Kingdom) Ray Armes
13	Silverstone Circuit (Grand Prix), Northamptonshire	8 October	(United Kingdom) Karl Jones	(United Kingdom) Andy Rouse	(United Kingdom) **Andy Rouse**	(United Kingdom) James Weaver	(United Kingdom) John Cleland	(United Kingdom) Ray Armes

- 1 hour endurance race.

== Driver Standings/Results ==
Overall DC	Class Pos	Driver	Class	OUL	SIL	THR	DON	THR	SIL	SIL	BRH	SNE	BRH	BIR	DON	SIL	Pts
1	1	(United Kingdom) John Cleland	C	**15**	19	**19**	**9**	**15**	**Ret**	**21**	**14**	**16**	**14**	**16**	**17**	**20**	110
2	1	(United Kingdom) James Weaver	B	**6**	13	**8**	**11**	**8**	**13**	**13**	**9**	12	**7**	**11**	12	**10**	109
3	1	(United Kingdom) Andy Rouse	A	**Ret**	**1**	**Ret**	Ret	1	**3**	**1**	2	2	**1**	1	3	1	78
4	2	(United Kingdom) Robb Gravett	A	1	2	5	**2**	Ret	1	2	**1**	**1**	Ret	**5**	**2**	3	74
5	2	(United Kingdom) Louise Aitken-Walker	C		20	15	12	16	19	22	15	17	15	17	18	22	72
6	2	(United Kingdom) Frank Sytner	B	10	**Ret**	7	6	19	Ret	15	11	**13**	9	12	**13**	11	70
7	1	(United Kingdom) Phil Dowsett	D	**Ret**	21	**17**	**13**	**Ret**	**20**	26			16	Ret			56
=	3	(United Kingdom) Tim Harvey	A	2	16	1	3	2	2	4	Ret	3		2	1	2	56
9	2	(United Kingdom) Tony Crudgington	D		Ret	20	15	20	24	29	Ret	22		Ret	24	25	37
=	3	(United Kingdom) John Llewellyn	B	14	24	26	7	13	16	19	12	15	19	14	15	14	37
11	4	(United Kingdom) Ian Forrest	B	Ret	18	18	8	Ret	15	17	DNS	14	10	13	14	19	35
12	4	(United Kingdom) Laurence Bristow	A	NC	3	Ret	1	18	6	5	6	5	2	3	10	4	32
13	3	(United Kingdom) Ray Armes	D							**25**	**17**	**19**	**Ret**	**Ret**	**21**	**21**	31
=	5	(United Kingdom) Godfrey Hall	B	12	15	9	Ret	12	17	Ret	DNS			15		13	31
15	4	(United Kingdom) Geoff Kimber-Smith	D	18	**Ret**	DNS	Ret	22		28	20	23	20	20	22	Ret	30
16	3	(United Kingdom) John Morris	C	Ret		16	Ret	17	21	Ret			20	19	Ret	24	27
17	4	(United Kingdom) Jeremy Rossiter	C							23	16	18	Ret	18	19	23	26
18	5	(United Kingdom) Les Liddiard	D		26	25	Ret	DNS	DNS	27				21	23	26	25
19	6	(United Kingdom) Tony Dolley	D	19	25	22			Ret	30			21	DNQ	DNQ	30	22
=	5	(United Kingdom) Alan Minshaw	C	Ret	**22**	24	16	Ret	22	24	19	21	Ret			18	22
21	5	(United Kingdom) Sean Walker	A	5	NC	4	4	6	5	9	Ret	6	4	8	5	8	17
22	6	(United Kingdom) Mark Goddard	D				13‡		23								15
23	6	(United Kingdom) Mike Jordan	C	16	23	21	14			Ret				DNS			15
24	6	(United Kingdom) Mike Newman	A	4	8	3	Ret	3	Ret	Ret	5	Ret	5	22	7	17	14
25	6	(Sweden) Nettan Lindgren	B	NC	17					18	13	20	17	Ret			12
=	7	(United Kingdom) John Clark	B	Ret	Ret	14	Ret		18	Ret	18	Ret	18	Ret		15	12
27	7	(United Kingdom) Mike Smith	A	7	10	10	Ret	5	4	10	3		Ret	Ret	9	7	10
28	8	(United Kingdom) Tiff Needell	A				1‡										9
=	8	(United Kingdom) Will Hoy	B				6‡										9
=	7	(United Kingdom) Ian Flux	C				9‡										9
=	7	(United Kingdom) Tony Lanfranchi	C										21		20	29	9
32	9	(United Kingdom) Guy Edwards	A	Ret	7	13	DSQ	DNS	DNP	3	4		Ret	7		6	8
33	10	(United Kingdom) Karl Jones	A	Ret	11	2	Ret	4	12	12	7	Ret	Ret	DNQ	8	**9**	7
=	11	(United Kingdom) David Sears	A				3‡								4		7
35	13	(United Kingdom) Jeff Allam	A				2‡										6
=	9	(United Kingdom) Gerry Marshall	B				7‡										6
=	8	(United Kingdom) Vince Woodman	C				12‡										6
=	8	(United Kingdom) Chuck Nicholson	D				15‡										6
=	12	(United Kingdom) Graham Goode	A	Ret	4	DNS	DNQ	10	Ret	6	Ret	11	6	9	6	Ret	6
=	14	(United Kingdom) Chris Hodgetts	A	8	6	Ret	DNQ	Ret	7	8				4	11	5	6
41	15	(United Kingdom) Jerry Mahony	A	3	27	6	Ret	Ret	9	11	8	9	8	10	Ret	Ret	5
42	16	(Australia) Tomas Mezera	A			Ret			DNS				3		Ret		4
=	10	(United Kingdom) Bernard Hunter	B				8‡										4
=	9	(United Kingdom) Peter Tyson	C				14‡										4
=	11	(United Kingdom) Steve Soper	B				11‡										4
=	17	(Netherlands) Gerrit van Kouwen	A	Ret	9	Ret	5	7	11	7	Ret	7	Ret	6			4
47	18	(United Kingdom) Damon Hill	A				4‡										3
=	19	(United Kingdom) Will Hoy	A									4					3
=	10	(United Kingdom) John Brindley	C				16‡										3
51	12	(United Kingdom) James Kaye	B	17													2
=	20	(Belgium) Pierre Dieudonné	A				5‡										2
=	13	(United Kingdom) Alan Minshaw	B											DNQ	16		2
53	21	(United Kingdom) Andrew Gilbert-Scott	A				10‡										1
=	14	(United Kingdom) Barrie Williams	B							20							1
55	22	(United Kingdom) Graham Hathaway	A	9			Ret	DNS					13		Ret		0
=	23	(United Kingdom) Robin Donovan	A	Ret	Ret	12	Ret	9	14	Ret							0
=	24	(United Kingdom) Mike O'Brien	A	13	14	11	Ret	Ret	DNQ	14	10	10	12	DNQ	Ret	12	0
=	25	(United Kingdom) Mark Rennison	A			Ret		DNS	10								0
=	26	(Sweden) Kaj Bornebusch	A	11	12												0
=	27	(United Kingdom) David Pinkney	A	DNQ	Ret	23	Ret	11	Ret	16			Ret				0
=	28	(United Kingdom) Nick May	A					21		Ret	?			DNQ		28	0
=	29	(United Kingdom) John Lepp	A									27					0
		(United Kingdom) Vic Lee	A				Ret‡								DNQ		0
		(United Kingdom) Lionel Abbott	B				Ret‡										0
		(United Kingdom) Mike Wilds	A				Ret‡										0
		(United Kingdom) Dave Wallis	A				Ret‡										0
		(United Kingdom) Andrew Jeffrey	B				Ret‡										0
		(United Kingdom) Barrie Williams	C				Ret‡										0
		(United Kingdom) Alistair Lyall	A				Ret‡										0
		(United Kingdom) Graham Scarborough	A				Ret‡										0
		(United Kingdom) Win Percy	A				Ret‡										0
		(United Kingdom) Gary Ayles	A				Ret‡										0
		(United Kingdom) Steve King	D				Ret‡										0
		(United Kingdom) Barbara Cowell	D				Ret‡										0
		(United Kingdom) Johnny Dumfries	A				DSQ‡										0
		(United Kingdom) Andrew Hepworth	A													16	0
		(United Kingdom) Jon Dooley	A													27	0
		(United Kingdom) David Leslie	A				DNQ‡										0
		(United Kingdom) Dave Brodie	A	DNA	5	DSQ	10	**DSQ**	8		DNS	8	11		NC	Ret	-37
Overall DC	Class Pos	Driver	Class	OUL	SIL	THR	DON	THR	SIL	SIL	BRH	SNE	BRH	BIR	DON	SIL	Pts

Colour	Result
Gold	Winner
Silver	Second place
Bronze	Third place
Green	Points classification
Blue	Non-points classification
Blue	Non-classified finish (NC)
Purple	Retired, not classified (Ret)
Red	Did not qualify (DNQ)
Red	Did not pre-qualify (DNPQ)
Black	Disqualified (DSQ)
White	Did not start (DNS)
White	Withdrew (WD)
White	Race cancelled (C)
Blank	Did not practice (DNP)
Blank	Did not arrive (DNA)
Blank	Excluded (EX)

- Note: **bold** signifies pole position, italics signifies fastest lap in class (1 point given).

‡ Endurance driver.
