= Colt Car Company =

Motor company owned by Mitsubishi, 1974–2021

Mitsubishi Motors UK
- Type: Private limited company
- Industry: Motor vehicle import and distribution
- Founded: UK (21 March 1974)
- Defunct: 1 October 2021 (Ended car sales)
- Headquarters: Watermoor, Cirencester, Gloucestershire, UK
- Revenue: £554 million
- Number of employees: 20
- Parent: Mitsubishi Corporation
- Subsidiaries: Spitalgate Dealer Services; Shogun Finance
- Website: mitsubishi-motors.co.uk

Colt Car Company, also known as Mitsubishi Motors UK, was a privately owned business established in 1974 as part of Mitsubishi Motors' global expansion programme for the purpose of importing and distributing cars and light commercial vehicles in the United Kingdom. For the first decade of its existence, British market Mitsubishis were sold under the "Colt" marque until the rebranding to Mitsubishi, which then brought the marque in line with the rest of the world.

Until 2008, it was a 51/49 joint venture between Colt Automotive Ltd and Mitsubishi Motors Corporation. Three subsidiary companies existed: Spitalgate Dealer Services, which specialises in dealer wholesale stocking, Shogun Finance, the retail finance company and Shogun Retail, the retail operations company.

On 1 October 2021, Mitsubishi Motors UK halted all new car sales for good as Mitsubishi's contract with the Colt Car Company (CCC) ended. On this date, CCC's aftersales business was sold to International Motors, a company known for launching Hyundai onto the UK market in 1981 and for being the current importer of Subaru and Isuzu vehicles. International Motors put the acquired operations into a new subsidiary called I.M. MAPS (UK) Ltd, which still had the rights to use the Mitsubishi Motors name for service parts and accessories.

== Sales since 1995 ==
For the first twenty years of its existence, business was restricted by voluntary import quotas, which limited the company to around 10,000 sales per year. The relaxation of these quotas in 1996, together with the introduction of European-built models at the NedCar facility in Born which were unaffected by the quota, allowed for a rapid expansion in the late 1990s.

In 2008, David Blackburn retired his shareholding of the company and his stake was sold to the Mitsubishi Corporation, specifically to its subsidiary MC Automobile (Europe) NV (MCAE). As result, Colt Car Company is now a wholly owned subsidiary of MCAE.

Year	Total sales
1995	c. 12,000
1996	c.17,700
1997	c.23,800
1998	c.23,500
1999	c.20,600
2000	18,087
2001	22,133
2002	26,419
2003	32,882
2004	37,545
2005	37,812
2006	34,467
2007	30,953

(Sources: Facts & Figures 2000, Facts & Figures 2005, Facts & Figures 2008, Mitsubishi Motors website)

== See also ==
- List of car manufacturers of the United Kingdom
