= Frank Sytner =

British racing driver (born 1944)

- Nationality: (United Kingdom) British
- Born: Franklin Goodman Sytner; 29 June 1944 (age 82) Liverpool, Lancashire, England

British Saloon / Touring Car Championship
- Years active: 1982–1985, 1987–1991
- Teams: Tom Walkinshaw Racing; Grace International Racing; Sytner BMW Racing; Prodrive; Pyramid Motorsport
- Starts: 83
- Wins: 2 (20 in class)
- Poles: 1
- Fastest laps: 16
- Best finish: 1st in 1988

Championship titles
- 1988 1988, 1990: British Touring Car Championship; BTCC - Class B

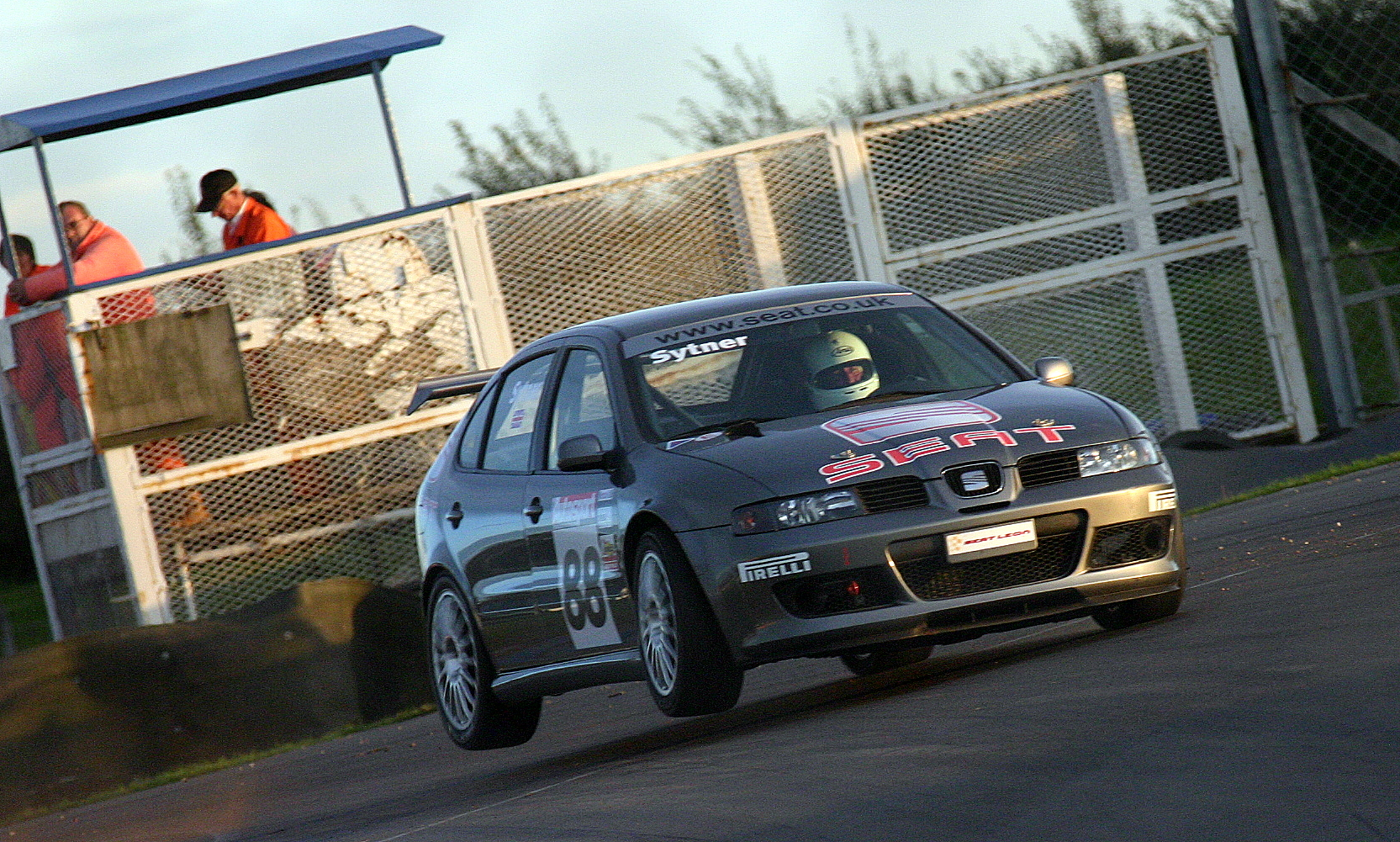
Sytner during the BTCC Masters in 2004

Franklin Goodman Sytner (born 29 June 1944 in Liverpool) is a British racing driver, a Life Member of the BRDC, and was the 1988 British Touring Car Champion, driving a BMW M3. He also won his class in 1990.

== Racing career ==
Sytner started racing in the early 1970s in Formula Ford and later became known for racing in the Clubmans formula for front-engined sports cars, before moving into Touring Cars in the 1980s. As a successful BMW dealer with a chain of dealerships it was natural that he should gravitate towards their products, however he started his BTCC career driving for Tom Walkinshaw's TWR team, which was running the Rover SD1 Vitesse. However, Sytner and Walkinshaw fell out and Frank abruptly left the team halfway through his first season. Sytner joined the BMW team, fielding the 635 model run by Ted Grace Racing. It was Sytner who protested the legality of the TWR Rovers in 1983, an action which eventually cost Steve Soper the championship that season. Sytner entered a semi-works BMW 635 in 1984, running under the Sytner Racing banner and finished second in class to Andy Rouse.

Sytner took a year out in 1986, but returned in 1987, having joined Prodrive who had taken over the factory BMW contract, running the BMW M3. Success was immediate, with several wins, before taking the BTCC title outright in 1988. Sytner won his class, the new look 2.0 litre super touring formula, and came second overall in 1990, despite strong competition from 1989 champion John Cleland in the works Vauxhall Cavalier. The two even had a controversial collision at the Birmingham Superprix late in the season. Sytner's final season was 1991, which saw him retire from the sport at the end of the year to concentrate on his car dealership.

Sytner moved into historic car racing in the 1990s, in both sports cars and historic Formula One cars - he is particularly known these days for his exploits in a Penske.

In 1997, Sytner won the Ferrari Sportscar Pre-1959 class at the Historic Grand Prix of Monaco in a Ferrari 250. In 2002, he even managed to win the F1 Grand Prix pre-1966 race in a Brabham BT4 at the same event.

Sytner took part in the BTCC Masters race at Donington Park race in 2004, and finished in 11th position.

== Business ventures ==
Together with his brother Alan Sytner, who at one time owned the Cavern Club in Liverpool Frank founded his first car dealership in Nottingham in 1968, specialising in BMWs. Sytner BMW was the first dealership in the UK to market the Alpina brand when it was given an exclusive contract in the early 1980s. Throughout the 1990s, Sytner expanded his business through acquisitions and shrewd investments. He now owns around 45 dealerships in total, selling Jeep, Mercedes, Ferrari and Lotus among other prestige marques.

Sytner underwent heart bypass surgery in May 2006.

Sytner suffered a suspected heart attack while racing a Lola at the Donington Historic Festival on 30 April 2011.

On 9 March 2020, Sytner filed a lawsuit against Laurence Vaughan, a then director of Sytner Group. Sytner accused Vaughan of mismanaging £12.5 million from Synergy Fund LLP, into which Frank had personally invested £15 million. The lawsuit alleged that Vaughan diverted the fund's assets for personal expenses rather than legitimate investments. Sytner sought £5 million in damages, but the case was ultimately dismissed by the High Court on the grounds of the statute of limitations.

== Racing record ==
=== Complete British Saloon / Touring Car Championship results ===
(key) (Races in bold indicate pole position) (Races in italics indicate fastest lap – 1 point awarded ?–1989 in class)

Year	Team	Car	Class	1	2	3	4	5	6	7	8	9	10	11	12	13	14	15	DC	Pts	Class
1982	Team Sanyo Racing with Esso	Rover 3500 S	D	SIL; Ret	MAL ovr:9† cls:7†	OUL; DNS	THR; Ret	THR	SIL	DON	BRH	DON	BRH	SIL					NC	0	NC
1983	Grace International Racing	BMW 635CSi	A	SIL	OUL	THR	BRH	THR	SIL ovr:3 cls:3	DON ovr:2 cls:2	SIL; DSQ	DON; Ret	BRH	SIL; Ret					16th	10	7th
1984	Sytner BMW Racing with GSi	BMW 635CSi	A	DON ovr:5 cls:5	SIL ovr:3 cls:3	OUL ovr:7 cls:7	THR ovr:4 cls:4	THR ovr:5 cls:5	SIL ovr:3 cls:3	SNE ovr:2 cls:2	BRH; Ret	BRH ovr:6 cls:6	DON ovr:3 cls:3	SIL ovr:3 cls:3					10th	30	**2nd**
1985	Sytner BMW Racing with GSi	BMW 635CSi	A	SIL ovr:1 cls:1	OUL; Ret	THR ovr:4 cls:4	DON ovr:4 cls:4	THR	SIL ovr:2 cls:2	DON ovr:6 cls:5	SIL; Ret	SNE ovr:3 cls:3	BRH	BRH ovr:4 cls:4	SIL; Ret				11th	30	4th
1987	Prodrive	BMW M3	B	SIL	OUL	THR	THR	SIL	SIL ovr:3 cls:1	BRH; Ret	SNE	**DON** ovr:1 cls:1	OUL; Ret	DON ovr:2 cls:1	SIL				11th	32	**3rd**
1988	BMW Finance Racing with Mobil 1	BMW M3	B	SIL ovr:4 cls:1	OUL ovr:6 cls:1	THR ovr:5 cls:1	DON ovr:7 cls:1	THR ovr:13 cls:3	SIL ovr:11 cls:1	SIL ovr:8 cls:1	BRH ovr:7 cls:1	SNE ovr:9 cls:1	BRH ovr:8 cls:1	BIR; C	DON ovr:11 cls:1	SIL ovr:7 cls:1			**1st**	**103**	**1st**
1989	BMW Team Finance	BMW M3	B	OUL ovr:10 cls:2	SIL; Ret	THR ovr:7 cls:1	DON ovr:6 cls:1	THR ovr:19 cls:4	SIL; Ret	SIL ovr:15 cls:2	BRH ovr:11 cls:2	SNE ovr:13 cls:2	BRH ovr:9 cls:2	BIR ovr:12 cls:2	DON ovr:13 cls:2	SIL ovr:11 cls:2			6th	70	**2nd**
1990	BMW Team Finance	BMW M3	B	OUL ovr:6 cls:2	DON ovr:6 cls:1	THR ovr:9 cls:3	SIL ovr:6 cls:1	OUL ovr:8 cls:1	SIL; Ret	BRH ovr:4 cls:1	SNE ovr:7 cls:2	BRH ovr:8 cls:2	BIR; Ret	DON ovr:7 cls:1	THR ovr:10 cls:5	SIL ovr:8 cls:2			**2nd**	**180**	**1st**
1991	Pyramid Motorsport	BMW M3		SIL; DNS	SNE; 5	DON; 3	THR; Ret	SIL; 6^{1}	BRH; 8	SIL; 10	DON; 1 Ret	DON; 2 DNS	OUL	BRH; 1; 9	BRH; 2; 7	DON; Ret	THR	SIL	12th	26	

1. – Race was stopped due to heavy rain. No points were awarded.

† Events with 2 races staged for the different classes.

‡ Endurance driver.

Sporting positions
Preceded by Chris Hodgetts	British Touring Car Champion; 1988	Succeeded by John Cleland
