= List of BTCC champions =

The title of BTCC champion is awarded to the driver who scores the most points overall in a British Touring Car Championship season. From 1992 to present a separate championship was awarded to the winning 'independent' (not officially manufacturer backed) driver, and from 2000 to 2003 the Production class had its own championship for the best 'class B' driver.

== Drivers' Championship winners ==
Year	Driver	Team	Car
1958	(United Kingdom) Jack Sears	Jack Sears	Austin 105 Westminster
1959	(United Kingdom) Jeff Uren	John Willment Automobiles	Ford Zephyr Six
1960	(United Kingdom) Doc Shepherd	Don Moore Racing	Austin A40
1961	(United Kingdom) Sir John Whitmore	BMC	Austin Mini Seven
1962	(Federation of Rhodesia and Nyasaland) John Love	Vita Racing	Morris Mini Cooper; Austin Mini Cooper
1963	(United Kingdom) Jack Sears	John Willment Automobiles	Ford Cortina GT; Ford Galaxie; Ford Cortina Lotus
1964	(United Kingdom) Jim Clark	Team Lotus	Lotus Cortina
1965	(United Kingdom) Roy Pierpoint	Alan Mann Racing	Ford Mustang
1966	(United Kingdom) John Fitzpatrick	Broadspeed	Ford Anglia
1967	(Australia) Frank Gardner	Alan Mann Racing	Ford Falcon Sprint
1968	(Australia) Frank Gardner	Alan Mann Racing	Ford Cortina Lotus; Ford Escort TC
1969	(Republic of Ireland) Alec Poole	Equipe Arden	Austin Mini Cooper S 970
1970	(United Kingdom) Bill McGovern	George Bevan Racing	Sunbeam Imp Sport
1971	(United Kingdom) Bill McGovern	George Bevan Racing	Sunbeam Imp Sport
1972	(United Kingdom) Bill McGovern	George Bevan Racing	Sunbeam Imp Sport
1973	(Australia) Frank Gardner	SCA European Road Services	Chevrolet Camaro
1974	(United Kingdom) Bernard Unett	Rootes Group	Hillman Avenger
1975	(United Kingdom) Andy Rouse	Broadspeed	Triumph Dolomite Sprint
1976	(United Kingdom) Bernard Unett	Chrysler Dealer Team	Chrysler Avenger GT
1977	(United Kingdom) Bernard Unett	Chrysler Dealer Team	Chrysler Avenger GT
1978	(United Kingdom) Richard Longman	Richard Longman	Mini 1275 GT
1979	(United Kingdom) Richard Longman	Richard Longman	Mini 1275 GT
1980	(United Kingdom) Win Percy	Tom Walkinshaw Racing	Mazda RX-7
1981	(United Kingdom) Win Percy	Tom Walkinshaw Racing	Mazda RX-7
1982	(United Kingdom) Win Percy	Hodgetts Motorsport	Toyota Corolla
1983	(United Kingdom) Andy Rouse	Industrial Control Services	Alfa Romeo GTV6
1984	(United Kingdom) Andy Rouse	Equipe Esso Daily Mirror	Rover 3500 Vitesse
1985	(United Kingdom) Andy Rouse	Andy Rouse Engineering	Ford Sierra XR4ti
1986	(United Kingdom) Chris Hodgetts	Hodgetts Motorsport	Toyota Corolla
1987	(United Kingdom) Chris Hodgetts	Hodgetts Motorsport	Toyota Corolla
1988	(United Kingdom) Frank Sytner	BMW Team Finance	BMW M3
1989	(United Kingdom) John Cleland	Vauxhall Motorsport	Vauxhall Astra 16v GTE
1990	(United Kingdom) Robb Gravett	Trakstar Motorsport	Ford Sierra RS500
1991	(United Kingdom) Will Hoy	BMW Team Listerine	BMW M3
1992	(United Kingdom) Tim Harvey	M Team Shell Racing with Listerine	BMW 318is
1993	(Germany) Joachim Winkelhock	BMW Motorsport Team	BMW 318is
1994	(Italy) Gabriele Tarquini	Alfa Corse	Alfa Romeo 155 TS
1995	(United Kingdom) John Cleland	Vauxhall Sport	Vauxhall Cavalier
1996	(Germany) Frank Biela	Audi Sport	Audi A4 Quattro
1997	(Switzerland) Alain Menu	Williams Renault Dealer Team	Renault Laguna
1998	(Sweden) Rickard Rydell	Volvo S40 Racing	Volvo S40
1999	(France) Laurent Aïello	Vodafone Nissan Racing	Nissan Primera
2000	(Switzerland) Alain Menu	Ford Team Mondeo	Ford Mondeo
2001	(United Kingdom) Jason Plato	Vauxhall Motorsport	Vauxhall Astra Coupé
2002	(United Kingdom) James Thompson	Vauxhall Motorsport	Vauxhall Astra Coupé
2003	(France) Yvan Muller	VX Racing	Vauxhall Astra Coupé
2004	(United Kingdom) James Thompson	VX Racing	Vauxhall Astra Coupé
2005	(United Kingdom) Matt Neal	Team Halfords	Honda Integra Type R
2006	(United Kingdom) Matt Neal	Team Halfords	Honda Integra Type R
2007	(Italy) Fabrizio Giovanardi	VX Racing	Vauxhall Vectra VXR
2008	(Italy) Fabrizio Giovanardi	VX Racing	Vauxhall Vectra VXR
2009	(United Kingdom) Colin Turkington	Team RAC	BMW 320si E90
2010	(United Kingdom) Jason Plato	Silverline Chevrolet	Chevrolet Cruze
2011	(United Kingdom) Matt Neal	Honda Racing Team	Honda Civic
2012	(United Kingdom) Gordon Shedden	Honda Yuasa Racing Team	Honda Civic
2013	(United Kingdom) Andrew Jordan	Pirtek Racing	Honda Civic
2014	(United Kingdom) Colin Turkington	eBay Motors	BMW 125i M Sport
2015	(United Kingdom) Gordon Shedden	Honda Yuasa Racing Team	Honda Civic Type R
2016	(United Kingdom) Gordon Shedden	Halfords Yuasa Racing	Honda Civic Type R
2017	(United Kingdom) Ashley Sutton	Adrian Flux Subaru Racing	Subaru Levorg
2018	(United Kingdom) Colin Turkington	West Surrey Racing	BMW 125i M Sport
2019	(United Kingdom) Colin Turkington	West Surrey Racing	BMW 330i M Sport
2020	(United Kingdom) Ashley Sutton	Laser Tools Racing	Infiniti Q50
2021	(United Kingdom) Ashley Sutton	Laser Tools Racing	Infiniti Q50
2022	(United Kingdom) Tom Ingram	Excelr8 Motorsport	Hyundai i30 Fastback N Performance
2023	(United Kingdom) Ashley Sutton	NAPA Racing UK	Ford Focus ST
2024	(United Kingdom) Jake Hill	Laser Tools Racing with MB Motorsport	BMW 330e M Sport
2025	(United Kingdom) Tom Ingram	Team VERTU	Hyundai i30 Fastback N Performance
2026	(United Kingdom) Ashley Sutton	NAPA Racing UK	Ford Focus Titanium Saloon

=== Repeat winners ===
Rank	Driver	Titles	Years
1	(United Kingdom) Ashley Sutton	5	2017, 2020, 2021, 2023, 2026
2	(United Kingdom) Andy Rouse	4	1975, 1983, 1984, 1985
2	(United Kingdom) Colin Turkington	4	2009, 2014, 2018, 2019
4	(Australia) Frank Gardner	3	1967, 1968, 1973
4	(United Kingdom) Bill McGovern	3	1970, 1971, 1972
4	(United Kingdom) Bernard Unett	3	1974, 1976, 1977
4	(United Kingdom) Win Percy	3	1980, 1981, 1982
4	(United Kingdom) Matt Neal	3	2005, 2006, 2011
4	(United Kingdom) Gordon Shedden	3	2012, 2015, 2016
10	(United Kingdom) Jack Sears	2	1958, 1963
10	(United Kingdom) Richard Longman	2	1978, 1979
10	(United Kingdom) Chris Hodgetts	2	1986, 1987
10	(United Kingdom) John Cleland	2	1989, 1995
10	(Switzerland) Alain Menu	2	1997, 2000
10	(United Kingdom) Jason Plato	2	2001, 2010
10	(United Kingdom) James Thompson	2	2002, 2004
10	(Italy) Fabrizio Giovanardi	2	2007, 2008
10	(United Kingdom) Tom Ingram	2	2022, 2025

== Independents' Championship winners ==
Year	Driver	Team	Car
1992	(United Kingdom) James Kaye	Park Lane Racing	Toyota Carina
1993	(United Kingdom) Matt Neal	Team Dynamics	BMW 318is
1994	(United Kingdom) James Kaye	Maxted Motorsport	Toyota Carina E
1995	(United Kingdom) Matt Neal	Team Dynamics	Ford Mondeo
1996	(United Kingdom) Lee Brookes	TOM's Team Brookes	Toyota Carina E
1997	(United Kingdom) Robb Gravett	Rock-It Cargo	Honda Accord
1998	(Norway) Tommy Rustad	DC Cook Motorsport	Renault Laguna
1999	(United Kingdom) Matt Neal	Max Power Racing Team Dynamics	Nissan Primera
2000	(United Kingdom) Matt Neal	Team Dynamics Max Power Racing	Nissan Primera
2001^{1}	(Brazil) Thomas Erdos	ABG Motorsport^{2}	Lexus IS200
2002	(United Kingdom) Dan Eaves	Team Halfords	Peugeot 406 Coupé
2003	(United Kingdom) Rob Collard	Collard Racing	Vauxhall Astra Coupé
2004	(United Kingdom) Anthony Reid	West Surrey Racing	MG ZS
2005	(United Kingdom) Matt Neal	Team Halfords	Honda Integra Type R
2006	(United Kingdom) Matt Neal	Team Halfords	Honda Integra Type R
2007	(United Kingdom) Colin Turkington	Team RAC	BMW 320si
2008	(United Kingdom) Colin Turkington	Team RAC	BMW 320si
2009	(United Kingdom) Colin Turkington	Team RAC	BMW 320si
2010	(United Kingdom) Tom Chilton	Team Aon	Ford Focus ST LPG
2011	(United Kingdom) James Nash	888 Racing with Collins Contractors	Vauxhall Vectra
2012	(United Kingdom) Andrew Jordan	Pirtek Racing	Honda Civic
2013	(United Kingdom) Andrew Jordan	Pirtek Racing	Honda Civic
2014	(United Kingdom) Colin Turkington	eBay Motors	BMW 125i M Sport
2015	(United Kingdom) Colin Turkington	Team BMR RCIB Insurance	Volkswagen CC
2016	(United Kingdom) Andrew Jordan	Motorbase Performance	Ford Focus ST
2017	(United Kingdom) Tom Ingram	Speedworks Motorsport	Toyota Avensis
2018	(United Kingdom) Tom Ingram	Speedworks Motorsport	Toyota Avensis
2019	(United Kingdom) Rory Butcher	Cobra Sport with AmD AutoAid RCIB Insurance Racing	Honda Civic Type R
2020	(United Kingdom) Ashley Sutton	Laser Tools Racing	Infiniti Q50
2021	(United Kingdom) Ashley Sutton	Laser Tools Racing	Infiniti Q50
2022	(United Kingdom) Josh Cook	Rich Energy BTC Racing	Honda Civic Type R
2023	(United Kingdom) Josh Cook	One Motorsport with Starline Racing	Honda Civic Type R
2024	(Republic of Ireland) Árón Taylor-Smith	Evans Halshaw Power Maxed Racing	Vauxhall Astra
2025	(United Kingdom) Daniel Lloyd	Restart Racing	Hyundai i30 Fastback N Performance

=== Repeat winners ===
Rank	Driver	Titles	Years
1	(United Kingdom) Matt Neal	6	1993, 1995, 1999, 2000, 2005, 2006
2	(United Kingdom) Colin Turkington	5	2007, 2008, 2009, 2014, 2015
3	(United Kingdom) Andrew Jordan	3	2012, 2013, 2016
4	(United Kingdom) James Kaye	2	1992, 1994
4	(United Kingdom) Tom Ingram	2	2017, 2018
4	(United Kingdom) Ashley Sutton	2	2020, 2021
4	(United Kingdom) Josh Cook	2	2022, 2023

=== Notes ===
1. - The Independent's championship was not officially awarded in 2001. Erdos was the leading non-works driver, although he did not receive a title or trophy.
2. - Team changed name to Total Motor Sport Racing mid-season

== Production class championship winners ==
Year	Driver	Team	Car
2000	(United Kingdom) Alan Morrison	Touring Car VIP Club	Peugeot 306
2001	(United Kingdom) Simon Harrison	HTML	Peugeot 306
2002	(United Kingdom) James Kaye	Synchro Motorsport	Honda Civic Type-R
2003	(United Kingdom) Luke Hines	Barwell Motorsport	Honda Civic Type R

== Jack Sears Trophy winners ==
Year	Driver	Team	Car
2013	(United Kingdom) Lea Wood	Wheel Heaven/Houseman Racing	Vauxhall Vectra
2014	(United Kingdom) Dave Newsham	AmD Tuning.com	Ford Focus ST Mk.III
2015	(United Kingdom) Josh Cook	Power Maxed Racing	Chevrolet Cruze
2016	(United Kingdom) Ashley Sutton	MG Racing RCIB Insurance	MG6 GT
2017	(United Kingdom) Senna Proctor	Power Maxed Racing	Vauxhall Astra
2018	(United Kingdom) Dan Cammish	Team Halfords Yuasa	Honda Civic Type R (FK8)
2019	(United Kingdom) Rory Butcher	Cobra Sport with AmD AutoAid RCIB Insurance Racing	Honda Civic Type R (FK2)
2020	(United Kingdom) Michael Crees	The Clever Baggers with BTC Racing	Honda Civic Type R (FK8)
2021	(United Kingdom) Daniel Rowbottom	Team Dynamics	Honda Civic Type R (FK8)
2022	(United Kingdom) Bobby Thompson	Autobrite Direct with JourneyHero	Cupra León
2023	(United Kingdom) Andrew Watson	CarStore Power Maxed Racing	Vauxhall Astra
2024	(United Kingdom) Mikey Doble	Evans Halshaw Power Maxed Racing	Vauxhall Astra
2025	(Philippines) Daryl DeLeon	West Surrey Racing	BMW 330i M Sport
2026	(United Kingdom) Dexter Patterson	Steel Seal with Power Maxed Racing	Audi S3 Saloon

== Manufacturers'/Constructors' Championship winners ==
Year	Make	Car	Wins
1991	(Germany) BMW	BMW M3	8/14
1992	(United Kingdom) Vauxhall	Vauxhall Cavalier	5/15
1993	(Germany) BMW	BMW 318i	8/17
1994	(Italy) Alfa Romeo	Alfa Romeo 155	9/21
1995	(France) Renault	Renault Laguna	10/25
1996	(Germany) Audi	Audi A4	8/26
1997	(France) Renault	Renault Laguna	14/24
1998	(Japan) Nissan	Nissan Primera	9/26
1999	(Japan) Nissan	Nissan Primera	13/26
2000	(United States) Ford	Ford Mondeo	11/24
2001	(United Kingdom) Vauxhall	Vauxhall Astra Coupé	25/26
2002	(United Kingdom) Vauxhall	Vauxhall Astra Coupé	15/20
2003	(United Kingdom) Vauxhall	Vauxhall Astra Coupé	11/20
2004	(United Kingdom) Vauxhall	Vauxhall Astra Coupé	11/30
2005	(United Kingdom) Vauxhall	Vauxhall Sport Hatch	8/30
2006	(Spain) SEAT	SEAT León	11/30
2007	(United Kingdom) Vauxhall	Vauxhall Vectra	10/30
2008	(United Kingdom) Vauxhall	Vauxhall Vectra	8/30
2009	(United Kingdom) Vauxhall	Vauxhall Vectra	6/30
2010	(Japan) Honda	Honda Civic	10/30
2011	(Japan) Honda	Honda Civic	13/30
2012	(Japan) Honda	Honda Civic	13/30
2013	(Japan) Honda	Honda Civic	15/30
2014	(United Kingdom) MG	MG 6	7/30
2015	(Japan) Honda	Honda Civic Type-R	7/30
2016	(Germany) BMW	BMW 125i M Sport	4/30
2017	(Germany) BMW	BMW 125i M Sport	5/30
2018	(Germany) BMW	BMW 125i M Sport	2/30
2019	(Germany) BMW	BMW 330i M Sport	11/30
2020	(Germany) BMW	BMW 330i M Sport	6/27
2021	(Germany) BMW	BMW 330i M Sport	5/30
2022	(Germany) BMW	BMW 330e M Sport	7/30
2023	(United States) Ford	Ford Focus ST	16/30
2024	(Germany) BMW	BMW 330e M Sport	13/30
2025	(South Korea) Hyundai	Hyundai i30 Fastback N Performance	9/30
2026	(United States) Ford	Ford Focus Titanium Saloon	/30

=== Most championships ===
Rank	Manufacturer	Titles	Years
1	(Germany) BMW	10	1991, 1993, 2016, 2017, 2018, 2019, 2020, 2021, 2022, 2024
2	(United Kingdom) Vauxhall	9	1992, 2001, 2002, 2003, 2004, 2005, 2007, 2008, 2009
3	(Japan) Honda	5	2010, 2011, 2012, 2013, 2015
4	(United States) Ford	3	2000, 2023, 2026
5	(France) Renault	2	1995, 1997
5	(Japan) Nissan	2	1998, 1999
7	(Italy) Alfa Romeo	1	1994
7	(Germany) Audi	1	1996
7	(Spain) SEAT	1	2006
7	(United Kingdom) MG	1	2014
7	(South Korea) Hyundai	1	2025

== Lombank Saloon Car Championship Entrants' Trophy winners ==
Year	Team
1965	Weybridge Engineering Company Ltd.
1966	Team Lotus

== Teams' Championship winners ==
Year	Team
1995	Vauxhall Sport
1996	Audi Sport
1997	Williams Renault Dealer Racing
1998	Vodafone Nissan Racing
1999	Vodafone Nissan Racing
2000	Ford Team Mondeo
2001	Vauxhall Motorsport
2002	Vauxhall Motorsport
2003	VX Racing
2004	VX Racing
2005	Team Halfords
2006	Team Halfords
2007	SEAT Sport UK
2008	VX Racing
2009	VX Racing
2010	Honda Racing Team
2011	Honda Racing Team
2012	Honda Yuasa Racing Team
2013	Honda Yuasa Racing Team
2014	eBay Motors
2015	Team BMR RCIB Insurance
2016	Team JCT600 with GardX
2017	Team BMW
2018	Team BMW
2019	Halfords Team Dynamics
2020	Team BMW
2021	Laser Tools Racing
2022	NAPA Racing UK
2023	NAPA Racing UK
2024	NAPA Racing UK
2025	NAPA Racing UK
2026	NAPA Racing UK
