= Win Percy =

English racing driver (born 1943)

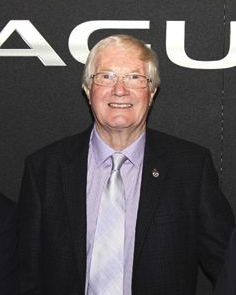
- Percy in 2012
- Nationality: (United Kingdom) British
- Born: Winston Walter Frederick Lawrence Percy; 28 September 1943 (age 83) Tolpuddle, Dorset, England

British Saloon / Touring Car Championship
- Years active: 1975–1984, 1987–1989, 1993
- Teams: Samuri Racing; Way Valley Racing; Toleman Group Motorsport; Team Toyota GB; Tom Walkinshaw Racing; Andy Rouse Engineering; Listerine Racing Team; Nissan Motorsport Europe; Janspeed
- Starts: 120
- Wins: 10 (47 in class)
- Poles: 12 (33 in class)
- Fastest laps: 17 (46 in class)
- Best finish: 1st in 1980, 1981, 1982

Championship titles
- 1980, 1981, 1982 1975 1976, 1982 1980, 1981: British Saloon Car Championship; BSCC - Class D BSCC - Class B BSCC - Class C

Winston Walter Frederick Lawrence Percy (born 28 September 1943) is a British former motor racing driver. Percy was British Touring Car Champion three times.

== Early years ==
Percy was born on 28 September 1943 in Tolpuddle, England, he trained as a motor mechanic. He found his way into motor sport through his first employment as a motor mechanic at his local garage. His first race was in 1964, in a local time-trial event driving his own road-going Ford Anglia 1200. He won, beating drivers of far more powerful cars in the process.

While he initially pursued competitive driving as a hobby, Percy's innate talent quickly resulted in many high-placed finishes in national-level races, including taking all three victories in the 1973 televised rallycross races at Cadwell Park. On the back of these results he turned professional in 1974, driving Spike Andersons Samuri Datsun 240Z in the British Modified Sports Car Championship. Once again, he won.

== British Touring Car Championship ==
The following year saw Percy enter the British Touring Car Championship for the first time, a race series that he would come to dominate in the years ahead. His first race in the BTCC would also be the first time he encountered Tom Walkinshaw, after Percy won his class driving a Toyota, and also attacked Walkinshaw's Ford Escort in the class above. In 1983, Percy won the Willhire 24 Hour in a Porsche 928S.

Percy stuck with Toyota for the next four years, until Walkinshaw offered him a drive in his Tom Walkinshaw Racing-run Mazda RX-7 for the 1980 season. Percy won the 1980 Championship for TWR, and then went on to repeat the feat in the following year. Owing to a misunderstanding of Walkinshaw's off-beat sense of humour, Percy agreed to move back to Toyota for 1982. He once again won the BTCC crown for the 1982 season in a Toyota Corolla.

== European and World Touring Car Championships ==
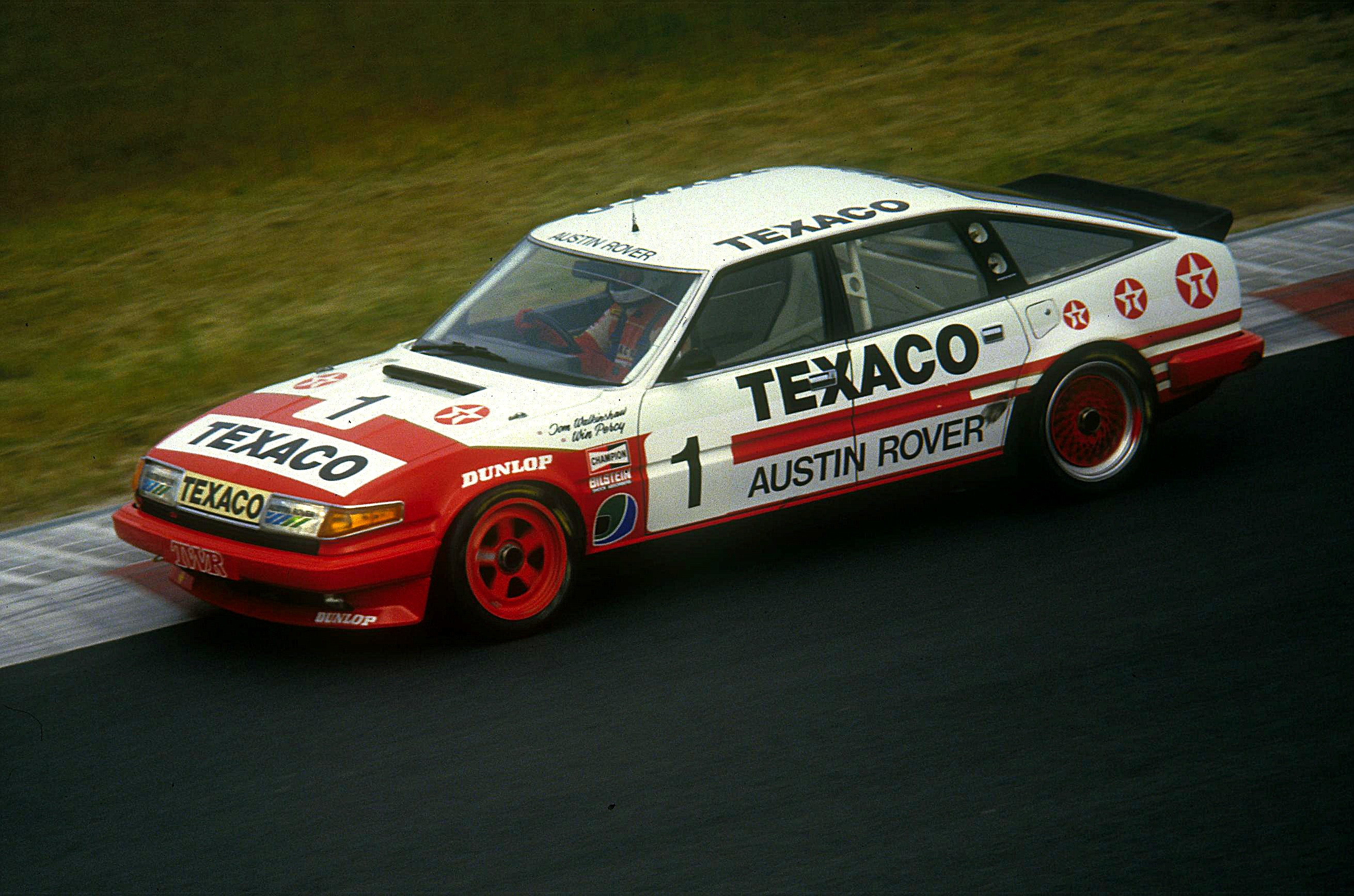
The Rover Vitesse of Tom Walkinshaw and Win Percy at the Nürburgring in 1985

Despite remaining with Toyota during the 1983 BTCC season, Percy maintained his links to TWR with occasional drives in V12 powered Jaguar XJS coupé which was proving the car to beat in Group A racing, and Walkinshaw managed to tempt him back full-time in 1984. However, rather than a return to the BTCC, TWR entered three of the Jaguars in the European Touring Car Championship with Percy co-driving the lead car with Walkinshaw.

The team won the 1984 ETCC with Walkinshaw also taking the drivers' title while the Walkinshaw, Percy and Hans Heyer Jaguar won the ETCC's blue riband event, the Spa 24 Hours. The following year after Jaguar shelved its touring car program to concentrate on racing Sportscars which saw TWR switch to works-backed Rover Vitesse V8s, again competing for the ETCC title. Walkinshaw and Percy this time took joint third in the drivers' championship. Along the way they scored victories in seven of the 500 km rounds: Donington, Silverstone, Monza, Vallelunga, Nogaro, the Österreichring and Salzburg. Percy and Walkinshaw finished third in the 1985 Bathurst 1000 in an XJS.

Once again, the TWR Vitesse cars were entered for the ETCC in 1986 where Percy finished second in the drivers' championship. He had been declared the champion until a month after the championship, when the FIA belatedly applied a rule that each driver's lowest scoring result would be dropped. This gave the championship to Schnitzer Motorsport driver Roberto Ravaglia. However, In 1986 Percy drove a TWR Jaguar XJR-6 Group C1 with Gianfranco Brancatelli and Hurley Haywood in the 24 Hours of Le Mans.

Percy entered Le Mans again the following year, but suffered a major crash when a tyre exploded at approximately 240 mph (386 km/h) on the long Mulsanne Straight, tearing off the rear bodywork and flipping the car into the air. The wreckage finally came to a halt 600 metres down the road but, despite almost obliterating the vehicle, Percy walked away from the crash with nothing more than a badly battered helmet.

With TWR not racing in the 1987 World Touring Car Championship, Percy only drove selected rounds of the series as a driver for hire. This saw him team with fellow Englishman Andy Rouse in a Ford Sierra RS500.

Percy contested the 1988 European Touring Car Championship driving a factory backed Nissan Skyline HR31 GTS-R with Allan Grice.

Percy continued to race in national and international competitions with a variety of teams until the end of the decade, winning the 1989 Spa 24 Hours race in an Eggenberger Motorsport Ford Sierra RS500.

After 1991, Percy drove in many series around the world. He contested the 1993 British Touring Car Championship in a Nissan Primera. While acting as team manager in the Mazda entry for the 1994 BTCC, and chief tester and latterly team manager for Harrier between 1995 and 1997, as a driver he took the Jaguar XJ220's first race win.

In the late 1990s, Percy became active on the historic motorsport stage, often driving his Jaguar D-type in historic sports car races. In 2002 he won all four races at the Le Mans Classic meeting.

== Australia ==
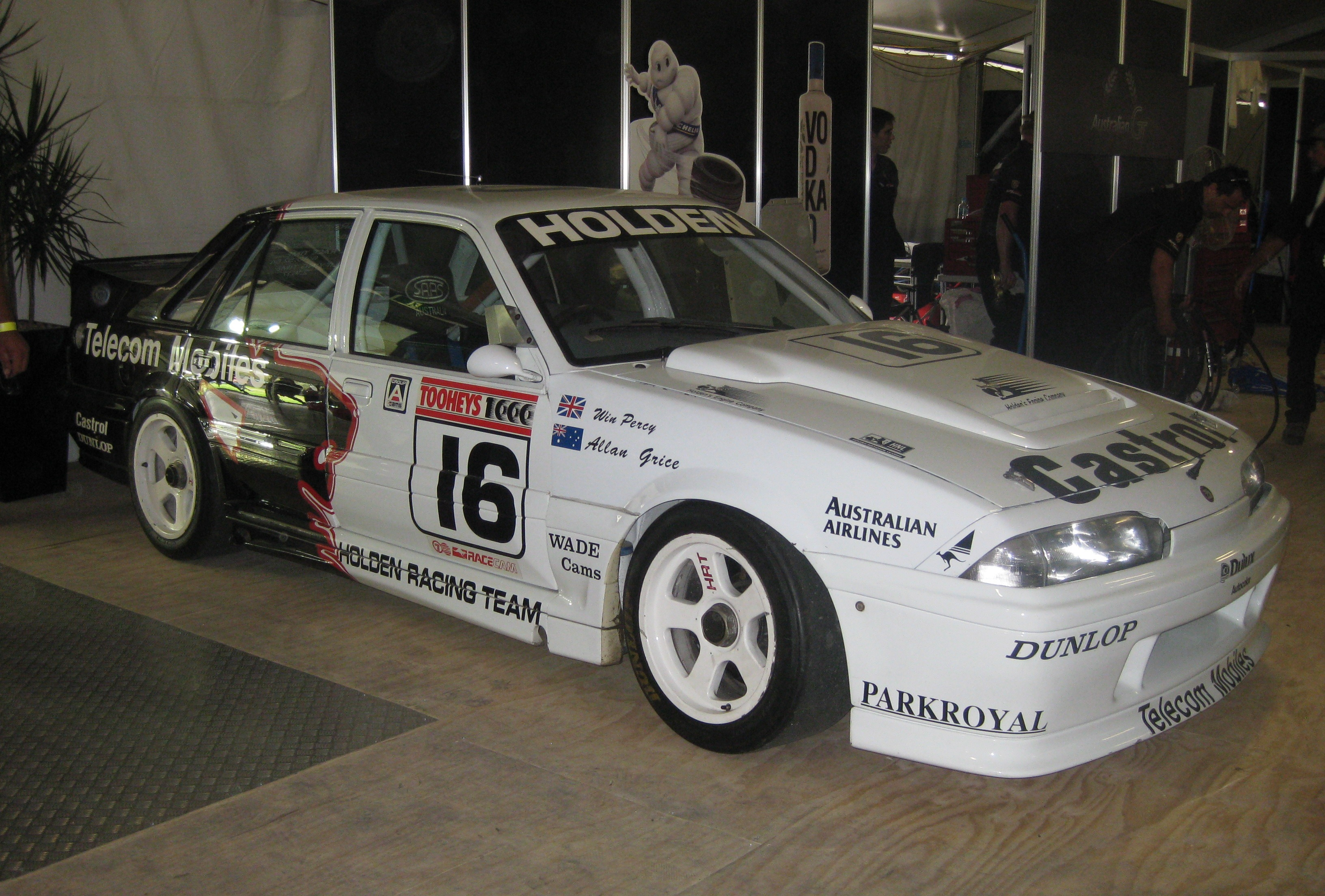
Percy managed and drove for the Holden Racing Team in 1990

Percy co-drove in the Australasian rounds of the 1987 World Touring Car Championship with Allan Grice in a Roadways Racing Holden Commodore VL, and again at the 1988 Bathurst 1000. He attempted the 1988 NASCAR Christmas 500 at the Calder Park Thunderdome, but would fail to qualify. In 1989, he contested the Australian endurance races with Perkins Engineering under the Holden Racing Team name.

In 1990, Percy established the Holden Racing Team for Tom Walkinshaw to contest the 1990 Australian Touring Car Championship fulfilling the dual roles of team manager and lead driver.

Percy and Grice were surprise winners of the 1990 Bathurst 1000 in a Holden Commodore VL, before finishing second in 1991 driving the newer Holden Commodore VN. At the end of the 1991 Australian Touring Car season after two years in charge of the Holden Racing Team, Percy and his wife returned to England. After a relatively quiet year in which he did little racing, Percy returned to Australia and the HRT in 1992 to drive a Holden Commodore VP alongside Grice at both the Sandown 500 and the Bathurst 1000, finishing fifth outright and first in Class C for the new spec cars at Bathurst.

Percy continued to contest the Australian endurance events, driving for the Holden Racing Team in 1993, Wayne Gardner Racing in 1994 and 1995, and John Faulkner Racing in 1997.

== Accident ==
In the summer of 2003, Percy suffered a serious accident in his garden. He was taken to hospital, where a medical error led to him being paralysed from the waist down. He sued the West Dorset General Hospital National Health Service Trust and received an out of court settlement of £1.55 million in April 2008. No longer able to compete, he is still a regular visitor to motor racing events around Britain. In 2013 he suffered a heart attack.

== Career results ==
Results sourced from Driver Database.

Season	Series	Position	Car	Team
1975	British Saloon Car Championship	**2nd**	Toyota Celica GT	Samuri Racing with Toyota GB
1976	British Saloon Car Championship	**2nd**	Toyota Celica GT	Samuri Racing with Toyota GB
1979	British Saloon Car Championship	5th	Toyota Celica GT	Hughes of Beaconsfield
1980	British Saloon Car Championship	**1st**	Mazda RX-7	Tom Walkinshaw Racing
1981	World Championship for Drivers and Makes	157th	Mazda RX-7	Mazdaspeed
1981	British Saloon Car Championship	**1st**	Mazda RX-7	Tom Walkinshaw Racing
1982	British Saloon Car Championship	**1st**	Toyota Celica GT	Toyota GB
1983	British Saloon Car Championship	16th	Toyota Celica GT	Toyota GB
1984	European Touring Car Championship	7th	Jaguar XJS	Tom Walkinshaw Racing
1984	British Saloon Car Championship	12th	Toyota Celica Supra	Toyota GB
1985	European Touring Car Championship	**3rd**	Rover Vitesse	Tom Walkinshaw Racing
1985	Australian Endurance Championship	23rd	Jaguar XJS	Jaguar Racing
1986	Nissan Mobil 500 Series	6th	Rover Vitesse	Tom Walkinshaw Racing
1986	European Touring Car Championship	**2nd**	Rover Vitesse	Tom Walkinshaw Racing
1987	British Touring Car Championship	22nd	Ford Sierra RS Cosworth; Ford Sierra RS500	Andy Rouse Engineering
1987	Nissan Mobil 500 Series	4th	Jaguar XJS	Tom Walkinshaw Racing
1987	World Touring Car Championship	NC	Ford Sierra RS500; Holden Commodore VL	Andy Rouse Engineering; Roadways Racing
1987	World Sportscar Championship	NC	Jaguar XJR-8; Ecosse C286 Ford	Tom Walkinshaw Racing; Ecurie Ecosse
1988	European Touring Car Championship	40th	Nissan Skyline HR31 GTS-R	Nissan Europe
1988	British Touring Car Championship	45th	Nissan Skyline HR31 GTS-R	Nissan Europe
1988	World Sportscar Championship	NC	Nissan R88C	Nissan Motorsports
1988	Asia-Pacific Touring Car Championship	NC	Holden Commodore VL SS Group A SV	Roadways Racing
1989	Nissan Mobil 500 Series	9th	Nissan Skyline HR31 GTS-R	Nissan Motorsport Australia
1990	Australian Touring Car Championship	8th	Holden Commodore VL SS Group A SV	Holden Racing Team
1990	Australian Endurance Championship	8th	Holden Commodore VL SS Group A SV	Holden Racing Team
1991	Australian Touring Car Championship	8th	Holden Commodore VN	Holden Racing Team
1991	Australian Endurance Championship	8th	Holden Commodore VN	Holden Racing Team
1993	British Touring Car Championship	12th	Nissan Primera eGT	Janspeed
1996	Eurocar V8 Championship	11th		

=== Complete British Saloon / Touring Car Championship results ===
(key) (Races in bold indicate pole position – 1973–1990 in class) (Races in italics indicate fastest lap – 1 point awarded ?–1989 in class)

Year	Team	Car	Class	1	2	3	4	5	6	7	8	9	10	11	12	13	14	15	16	17	DC	Pts	Class
1975	Samuri Racing with Toyota GB	Toyota Celica GT	D	MAL ovr:6† cls:1†	BRH; DNS	OUL ovr:3† cls:1†	THR ovr:12 cls:1	SIL ovr:17 cls:1	BRH ovr:10† cls:4†	THR ovr:? cls:1	SIL ovr:?† cls:1†	MAL ovr:4† cls:2†	SNE; Ret	SIL ovr:? cls:1	ING ovr:1† cls:1†	BRH ovr:?† cls:1†	OUL; Ret	BRH ovr:? cls:1			**2nd**	**78**	**1st**
1976	Samuri Racing with Toyota GB	Toyota Celica GT	B	BRH ovr:7 cls:1	SIL ovr:10 cls:1	OUL ovr:?† cls:1†	THR ovr:7 cls:1	THR ovr:? cls:1	SIL ovr:? cls:1	BRH; Ret	MAL ovr:1† cls:1†	SNE ovr:1† cls:1†	BRH ovr:9 cls:1								**2nd**	**81**	**1st**
1977	Samuri Racing with Bradshaw Plant Hire	Ford Capri II 3.0s	D	SIL; DNS	BRH; Ret	OUL ovr:7† cls:6†	THR ovr:4 cls:4	SIL ovr:7 cls:7	THR; Ret	DON ovr:11† cls:8†	SIL; Ret	DON ovr:4† cls:3†	BRH	THR	BRH ovr:? cls:?						23rd	3	8th
1978	Way Valley Racing Bradshaw Plant Hire	Toyota Celica GT	B	SIL	OUL	THR	BRH ovr:2† cls:2†	SIL ovr:2† cls:2†	DON ovr:3† cls:2†	MAL ovr:2† cls:2†	BRH ovr:12 cls:2	DON ovr:2† cls:2†	BRH ovr:? cls:1	THR ovr:? cls:?	OUL ovr:2† cls:2†						6th	56	?
1978	Way Valley Racing Bradshaw Plant Hire	Triumph Dolomite Sprint	C							MAL ovr:8† cls:2†					OUL ovr:10† cls:4†						6th	?	?
1978	Toleman Group Motorsport	BMW 530i	D									DON; Ret†									6th	?	?
1979	Team Toyota GB Hughes of Beaconsfield	Toyota Celica GT	B	SIL ovr:? cls:3	OUL; Ret	THR ovr:15 cls:2	SIL ovr:14 cls:1	DON ovr:? cls:1	SIL; DSQ	**MAL** ovr:1† cls:1†	DON ovr:? cls:2	BRH ovr:? cls:2	THR ovr:9 cls:2	SNE ovr:6 cls:1	OUL ovr:2† cls:2†						5th	70	**2nd**
1980	TWR Pentax	Mazda RX-7	C	MAL ovr:4† cls:1†	OUL ovr:6† cls:1†	THR ovr:3 cls:1	SIL ovr:7 cls:1	SIL ovr:3 cls:1	BRH ovr:7 cls:1	MAL ovr:7† cls:1†	BRH ovr:7 cls:1	THR ovr:6 cls:1	SIL ovr:6 cls:1								**1st**	**90**	**1st**
1981	Mazda Motorsport	Mazda RX-7	C	MAL ovr:2† cls:1†	**SIL**; Ret	**OUL** ovr:1† cls:1†	THR ovr:4 cls:1	**BRH** ovr:2† cls:1†	SIL ovr:4 cls:1	SIL ovr:4 cls:1	**DON** ovr:1† cls:1†	**BRH** ovr:2 cls:1	THR ovr:2 cls:1	SIL							**1st**	**78**	**1st**
1982	Team Toyota GB Hughes of Beaconsfield	Toyota Corolla GT	B	SIL ovr:7 cls:1	**MAL** ovr:1† cls:1†	**OUL** ovr:1† cls:1†	THR ovr:7 cls:1	THR ovr:8 cls:1	SIL ovr:10 cls:1	DON ovr:6 cls:1	BRH ovr:8 cls:1	DON ovr:6 cls:1	BRH ovr:4 cls:1	SIL ovr:9 cls:1							**1st**	**90**	**1st**
1983	Team Toyota GB Hughes of Beaconsfield	Toyota Corolla GT	C	SIL ovr:6 cls:1	OUL	THR															17th	9	9th
1983	Team Toyota GB Hughes of Beaconsfield	Toyota Celica Supra	A				BRH ovr:8* cls:4*	THR; DNS	SIL	DON	SIL ovr:6 cls:6	DON ovr:3 cls:3	BRH; Ret	SIL; Ret							21st	5	6th
1984	Team Toyota GB Hughes of Beaconsfield	Toyota Celica Supra	A	DON ovr:6 cls:6	SIL	OUL ovr:4 cls:4	THR; Ret	THR; Ret	SIL	SNE	**BRH**; Ret	**BRH** ovr:1 cls:1	**DON** ovr:2 cls:2	SIL ovr:2 cls:2							12th	27	**3rd**
1987	Andy Rouse Engineering	Ford Sierra RS Cosworth	A	SIL	OUL	THR	THR	SIL	**SIL** ovr:1 cls:1	BRH	SNE	DON									22nd	10	10th
1987	Listerine Racing Team	Ford Sierra RS500	A										OUL; Ret‡	DON	SIL						22nd	10	10th
1988	Nissan Motorsport Europe	Nissan HR31 Skyline GTS-R	A	SIL	OUL	THR	DON ovr:4 cls:4	THR	SIL	SIL	BRH	SNE	BRH	BIR	DON	SIL					43rd	4	17th
1989	Andy Rouse Engineering	Ford Sierra RS500	A	OUL	SIL	THR	DON; Ret‡	THR	SIL	SIL	BRH	SNE	BRH	BIR	DON	SIL					NC	0	NC
1993	Janspeed	Nissan Primera eGT		SIL; 7	DON; Ret	SNE; 8	DON; 11	OUL	BRH; 1; 5	BRH; 2; 4	PEM; 9	SIL; 2	KNO; 1 DNS	KNO; 2 DNS	OUL; 18	BRH; 11	THR; Ret	DON; 1; 10	DON; 2; 7	SIL; Ret	12th	38	

† Events with 2 races staged for the different classes.

‡ Endurance driver.

- No points awarded due to lack of car homologation papers.

=== Complete European Touring Car Championship results ===
(key) (Races in bold indicate pole position) (Races in italics indicate fastest lap)

Year	Team	Car	1	2	3	4	5	6	7	8	9	10	11	12	13	14	DC	Points
1979	(United Kingdom) **The Akai Golf**	Volkswagen Golf Mk1	MNZ	VAL	MUG	BRA; DNS	JAR	ZEL	BRN	NUR	ZAN	SAL	PER				NC	10
1979	(United Kingdom) **Browne & Day**	Ford Capri III 3.0S												SIL; 6	ZOL		NC	10
1982	(United Kingdom) **Tom Walkinshaw Racing**	Jaguar XJS	MNZ	VAL	DON	PER	MUG	BRN	SAL	NUR	SPA; Ret						NC	NA
1982	(United Kingdom) **Patrick Motorsport**	Rover Vitesse										SIL; 15	ZOL				NC	NA
1983	(United Kingdom) **Tom Walkinshaw Racing**	Jaguar XJS	MNZ; DNS	VAL	DON	PER	MUG	BRN	ZEL	NUR	SAL	SPA; Ret		ZOL; 8			NC	NA
1983	(United Kingdom) **Team Toyota GB**	Toyota Celica Supra											SIL; 16				NC	NA
1984	(United Kingdom) **Tom Walkinshaw Racing**	Jaguar XJS	MNZ; Ret	VAL; 11	**DON**; 1	PER; 3	BRN; 2	ZEL; 2	SAL; 1	NUR; Ret	**SPA**; 1	**SIL**; Ret	ZOL; 4	**MUG**; Ret			7th	145
1985	(United Kingdom) **Tom Walkinshaw Racing**	Rover Vitesse	MNZ; 1	**VAL**; 1	**DON**; 1	AND; Ret	BRN; 8	ZEL; Ret	SAL; 2	NUR; Ret	**SPA**; Ret	SIL; 1	NOG; 1	**ZOL**; Ret	EST; Ret	JAR; 1	3rd	198
1986	(United Kingdom) **Tom Walkinshaw Racing**	Rover Vitesse	MNZ; 1	**DON**; 1	**HOC**; 4	MIS; 3	**AND**; 2	BRN; 2	ZEL; 1	**NUR**; 4	**SPA**; Ret	SIL; 2	**NOG**; 16	ZOL; 3	EST; 2	**JAR**; 2	2nd	203
1988	(United Kingdom) **Nissan Europe**	Nissan Skyline HR31 GTS-R	MNZ	DON; Ret	EST	JAR	DIJ; Ret	VAL	NUR; 19	SPA; 6	ZOL; Ret	SIL; Ret	NOG; 11				40th	45

=== Complete World Touring Car Championship results ===
(key) (Races in bold indicate pole position) (Races in italics indicate fastest lap)

Year	Team	Car	1	2	3	4	5	6	7	8	9	10	11	DC	Points
1987	(United Kingdom) **Andy Rouse Engineering**	Ford Sierra RS Cosworth	MNZ	JAR	DIJ	NUR	SPA; Ret	BNO						NC	0
1987	(United Kingdom) **Andy Rouse Engineering**	Ford Sierra RS500							SIL; Ret					NC	0
1987	(Australia) **Roadways Racing**	Holden Commodore VL								BAT; Ret	CLD; Ret	WEL; Ret	FJI	NC	0

=== Complete Asia-Pacific Touring Car Championship results ===
(key) (Races in bold indicate pole position) (Races in italics indicate fastest lap)

Year	Team	Car	1	2	3	4	DC	Points
1988	(Australia) Roadways Racing	Holden Commodore VL SS Group A SV	BAT; 15	WEL; Ret	PUK; Ret	FJI	NC	0

=== Complete Australian Touring Car Championship results ===
(key) (Races in bold indicate pole position) (Races in italics indicate fastest lap)

Year	Team	Car	1	2	3	4	5	6	7	8	9	DC	Points
1990	(Australia) Holden Racing Team	Holden Commodore VL SS Group A SV	AMA; 14	SYM; 9	PHI; 7	WIN; Ret	LAK; 3	MAL	WAN; 5	ORA; 6		8th	32
1991	(Australia) Holden Racing Team	Holden Commodore VN	SAN; 5	SYM; Ret	WAN; Ret	LAK; 11	WIN; 6	AMA; 8	MAL; 4	LAK	ORA; 8	8th	30

=== Complete 24 Hours of Le Mans results ===
Year	Team	Co-drivers	Car	Class	Laps	Overall position	Class position
1981	(Japan) Mazdaspeed	(Japan) Yojiro Terada (Japan) Hiroshi Fushida	Mazda RX-7	IMSA GTO	25	DNF	DNF
1986	(United Kingdom) Tom Walkinshaw Racing	(Italy) Gianfranco Brancatelli (United States) Hurley Haywood	Jaguar XJR-6	C1	154	DNF	DNF
1987	(United Kingdom) Tom Walkinshaw Racing	(Netherlands) Jan Lammers (United Kingdom) John Watson	Jaguar XJR-8LM	C1	158	DNF	DNF
1988	(Japan) Nissan Motorsports	(Australia) Allan Grice (United Kingdom) Mike Wilds	Nissan R88C	C1	344	14th	13th
1993	(United Kingdom) TWR Jaguar Racing	(Germany) Armin Hahne (United Kingdom) David Leslie	Jaguar XJ220	GT	6	DNF	DNF
1995	(United Kingdom) PC Automotive Jaguar	(Switzerland) Bernard Thuner (France) Olindo Iaccobelli	Jaguar XJ220	GT1	123	DNF	DNF

=== Complete Spa 24 Hour results ===
Year	Team	Co-drivers	Car	Class	Laps	Overall position	Class position
1979	(United Kingdom) Equipe Esso	(United Kingdom) Vince Woodman (United Kingdom) Jonathan Buncombe	Ford Capri III 3.0S	+2500	NA	DNF	DNF
1980	(United Kingdom) Tom Walkinshaw Racing	(United Kingdom) Pete Lovett	Mazda RX-7	-2500	347	DNF	DNF
1981	(United Kingdom) Tom Walkinshaw Racing	(Belgium) Marc Duez (United Kingdom) Jeff Allam (United Kingdom) Chuck Nicholson	Mazda RX-7	-2500	445	4th	**1st**
1982	(United Kingdom) Tom Walkinshaw Racing	(United Kingdom) Tom Walkinshaw (United Kingdom) Chuck Nicholson	Jaguar XJS	Div. 3	NA	DNF	DNF
1983	(United Kingdom) Tom Walkinshaw Racing	(United Kingdom) Martin Brundle (Switzerland) Enzo Calderari	Jaguar XJS	Div. 3	NA	DNF	DNF
1984	(United Kingdom) Tom Walkinshaw Racing	(United Kingdom) Tom Walkinshaw (West Germany) Hans Heyer	Jaguar XJS	Div. 3	453	**1st**	**1st**
1985	(United Kingdom) Tom Walkinshaw Racing	(United Kingdom) Tom Walkinshaw (West Germany) Hans Heyer	Rover Vitesse	Div. 3	86	DNF	DNF
1986	(United Kingdom) Tom Walkinshaw Racing	(United Kingdom) Tom Walkinshaw (Belgium) Eddy Joosen	Rover Vitesse	Div. 3	383	DNF	DNF
1987	(United Kingdom) Andy Rouse Engineering	(United Kingdom) Andy Rouse (Belgium) Thierry Tassin	Ford Sierra RS Cosworth	Div. 3	252	DNF	DNF
1988	(United Kingdom) Nissan Motorsports Europe	(Australia) Allan Grice (Sweden) Anders Olofsson	Nissan Skyline HR31 GTS-R	Div. 3	482	6th	4th
1989	(Switzerland) Eggenberger Motorsport	(Italy) Gianfranco Brancatelli (West Germany) Bernd Schneider	Ford Sierra RS500	Div. 3	481	**1st**	**1st**

=== Complete Bathurst 1000 results ===
Year	Team	Co-drivers	Car	Class	Laps	Overall position	Class position
1985	(United Kingdom) Tom Walkinshaw Racing	(United Kingdom) Tom Walkinshaw	Jaguar XJS	C	160	**3rd**	**3rd**
1987	(Australia) Roadways Racing	(Australia) Allan Grice	Holden Commodore VL	1	96	DNF	DNF
1988	(Australia) Roadways Racing	(Australia) Allan Grice	Holden Commodore VL SS Group A SV	A	139	15th	11th
1989	(Australia) Holden Racing Team	(Australia) Neil Crompton	Holden Commodore VL SS Group A SV	A	158	7th	7th
1990	(Australia) Holden Racing Team	(Australia) Allan Grice	Holden Commodore VL SS Group A SV	A	161	**1st**	**1st**
1991	(Australia) Holden Racing Team	(Australia) Allan Grice	Holden Commodore VN	A	160	**2nd**	**2nd**
1992	(Australia) Holden Racing Team	(Australia) Allan Grice	Holden Commodore VP	C	141	5th	**1st**
1993	(Australia) Holden Racing Team	(Australia) Tomas Mezera	Holden Commodore VP	A	107	DNF	DNF
1994	(Australia) Wayne Gardner Racing	(Australia) Russell Ingall	Holden Commodore VP	A	161	5th	5th
1995	(Australia) Wayne Gardner Racing	(Australia) Brad Jones	Holden Commodore VR		161	5th	5th
1997	(Australia) John Faulkner Racing	(New Zealand) John Faulkner	Holden Commodore VS	L1	154	5th	5th

Sporting positions
Preceded by Richard Longman	British Touring Car Champion; 1980, 1981, 1982	Succeeded by Andy Rouse
Preceded by Dick Johnson; John Bowe	Winner of the Bathurst 1000; 1990 (with Allan Grice)	Succeeded by Jim Richards; Mark Skaife
