= Neil McGrath =

British racing driver (born 1942)

- Nationality: (United Kingdom) British
- Born: 4 December 1942 (age 83) Blackburn, Lancashire, England

British Saloon Car Championship
- Years active: 1980–1982, 1984–1986
- Teams: Renault Dealer Racing; Linden Racing
- Starts: 36
- Wins: 0 (2 in class)
- Poles: 1
- Fastest laps: 1 (5 in class)
- Best finish: 7th in 1985

Championship titles
- 1974, 1975, 1976, 1978: Renault 5 Cup Great Britain

Neil McGrath (born 4 December 1942) is a former British racing driver. He regularly competed in the British Saloon Car Championship. In 1985, he finished seventh overall and third in Class A. The cars he used were the Renault 5, Austin Metro and Rover Vitesse. He won the Renault 5 championship in 1974, 1975, 1976 and 1978. He is a former class champion in a Renault Gordini in the Production Saloon Car Championship, having won it in 1979. Across his career, McGrath has 136 race wins. He is a life long member of the BRDC.

== Racing record ==
=== Complete British Saloon Car Championship results ===
(key) (Races in bold indicate pole position; races in italics indicate fastest lap.)

Year	Team	Car	Class	1	2	3	4	5	6	7	8	9	10	11	12	DC	Pts	Class
1980	Renault Dealer Racing	Renault 5 Gordini	B	MAL	OUL	THR	SIL	SIL	BRH	MAL ?†	BRH	THR	SIL			NC	0	NC
1981	Everest Double Glazing with Linden Racing	Austin Metro 1300 HLS	A	MAL	SIL	OUL	THR	BRH; 3†	SIL; 18	SIL; 21	DON; 8†	BRH; DNS	THR	SIL; 13		12th	33	4th
1982	Everest Double Glazing with Linden Racing	Austin Metro 1300 HLS	A	SIL ?	MAL; Ret†	OUL; Ret†	THR; Ret	THR; 18	SIL; 17	DON; Ret	BRH; 19	DON; 12	BRH; Ret	SIL ?		17th	23	5th
1984	Linden Racing with Connells Estate Agents	Rover Vitesse	A	DON	SIL	OUL	THR	THR	SIL; 9	SNE; 5	BRH ?	BRH; 11	DON; 5	SIL; Ret		21st	4	9th
1985	Castrol Sport Racing with Connells Estate Agents	Rover Vitesse	A	**SIL**; 2	OUL; 2	THR; 2	DON; 3	THR; 2	SIL; 4	DON; 4	SIL; 4	SNE; 2	BRH	BRH; 6	SIL; 4	7th	45	**3rd**
1986	Linden Racing with Connells Estate Agents	Rover Vitesse	A	SIL	THR	SIL; 2	DON	BRH; Ret	SNE	BRH	DON	SIL				22nd	6	9th

† Events with 2 races staged for the different classes.
