= Richard Longman =

British racing driver (born 1946)

- Nationality: (United Kingdom) British
- Born: Richard Arthur Longman; 18 March 1946 (age 80) Calcutta, India

British Saloon Car Championship
- Years active: 1970, 1976–1986
- Teams: Downton Engineering Ltd; Longman Racing; Patrick MotorSport
- Starts: 106
- Wins: 1 (48 in class)
- Poles: 0
- Fastest laps: 48
- Best finish: 1st in 1978, 1979

Championship titles
- 1978, 1979 1978, 1979, 1982 1984 1986: British Saloon Car Championship; BSCC - Class A BSCC - Class C BSCC - Class B

Richard Arthur Longman is a British racing driver and renowned motorsport preparation expert. He was twice champion of the British Touring Car Championship (then known as the British Saloon Car Championship) in 1978 and 1979 driving a Mini 1275 GT for Patrick Motorsport, which ran the works British Leyland supported team. The following year, he switched to a class C Ford Fiesta. In 1984, he was class C champion in his Ford Escort Mk3 RS1600i.

Longman also has a house in the Bahamas as well as property in the New Forest, Hampshire.

== Racing record ==
=== Complete British Saloon Car Championship results ===
(key) (Races in bold indicate pole position; races in italics indicate fastest lap.)

Year	Team	Car	Class	1	2	3	4	5	6	7	8	9	10	11	12	DC	Pts	Class
1970	Downton Engineering Ltd	BMC Mini Cooper S	B	BRH; 12	SNE; 12	THR; 11	SIL; DNQ	CRY; DNS	SIL	SIL	CRO	BRH	OUL	BRH	BRH	13th	20	**3rd**
1976	Richard Longman	BMC Mini Cooper S	A	BRH	SIL	OUL	THR	THR ?	SIL	BRH	MAL	SNE	BRH			30th	6	8th
1977	Patrick Motor Group	Mini 1275 GT	A	SIL	BRH	OUL	THR	SIL ?	THR ?	DON; 3†	SIL; 16	DON; 1†	BRH ?	THR ?	BRH; 11	5th	28	**2nd**
1978	Patrick MotorSport	Mini 1275 GT	A	SIL; 10	OUL; 3†	THR ?	BRH; 3†	SIL; 3†	DON; 4†	MAL; Ret	BRH ?	DON; 3†	BRH ?	THR ?	OUL; 4†	**1st**	**100**	**1st**
1979	Patrick MotorSport	Mini 1275 GT	A	SIL; 14	OUL; 2†	THR; 20	SIL; 18	DON ?	SIL ?	MAL; 3†	DON ?	BRH ?	THR ?	SNE; 15	OUL; 5†	**1st**	**97**	**1st**
1980	Datapost Racing	Ford Fiesta	B	MAL; 2†	OUL; 4†	THR; 12	SIL; Ret	SIL; Ret	BRH ?	MAL; 4†	BRH; 14					14th	24	5th
1980	Datapost Racing	Ford Fiesta	A									THR ?	SIL; Ret			14th	24	7th
1981	Team Datapost Racing with Hepolite and Esso	Austin Metro 1300 HLS	A	MAL; Ret†	SIL; 15	OUL; 13†	THR ?	BRH; 7†	SIL ?	SIL; 18	DON; 6†	BRH; 14	THR ?	SIL; 11		5th	58	**2nd**
1982	Royal Mail Datapost Racing with Esso	Austin Metro 1300 HLS	A	SIL; 10	MAL; 9†	OUL; 4†	THR; 13	THR; 13	SIL; 15	DON; Ret	BRH; 16	DON; 10	BRH; 7	SIL ?		**2nd**	**72**	**1st**
1983	Royal Mail Datapost	Ford Escort RS1600i	C	SIL; 14	OUL; 9	THR; 16	BRH; 13	THR; 10	SIL; Ret	DON; Ret	SIL; 11	DON; 11	BRH; 11	SIL; 12		7th	35	4th
1984	Royal Mail Datapost	Ford Escort RS1600i	C	DON; 16	SIL; 10	OUL; 10	THR; 12	THR; Ret	SIL ?	SNE; 12	BRH; 13	BRH; 13	DON; 13	SIL; 12		**2nd**	**74**	**1st**
1985	Royal Mail Datapost	Ford Escort RS Turbo	B	SIL	OUL	THR	DON	THR	SIL; 6	DON; 8	SIL; 5	SNE; 4	BRH; 7	BRH; 18	SIL; Ret	7th	45	4th
1986	Royal Mail Datapost	Ford Escort RS Turbo	B	SIL; 5	THR; 7	SIL; 3	DON; 3	BRH; 8	SNE; 3	BRH; 7	DON; Ret	SIL; 3				**2nd**	**64**	**1st**

† Events with 2 races staged for the different classes.

Sporting positions
Preceded by Bernard Unett	British Touring Car Champion; 1978-79	Succeeded by Win Percy
