= Toyota GB =

Toyota GB may refer to:

- Toyota (GB) PLC, the subsidiary of Toyota in Great Britain
- Toyota G1 § GB a Toyota truck
