= Andy Rouse =

British racing driver (born 1947)

- Nationality: (United Kingdom) British
- Born: Andrew Ernest Rouse; 2 December 1947 (age 78) Dymock, Gloucestershire England

British Saloon / Touring Car Championship
- Years active: 1973–1976, 1978–1994
- Starts: 231
- Wins: 60 (24 in class)
- Poles: 54 (18 in class)
- Fastest laps: 49 (23 in class)
- Best finish: 1st in 1975, 1983, 1984 and 1985

Previous series
- 1987 1972: WTCC; Ford Escort Mexico Challenge

Championship titles
- 1972 1975, 1983, 1984, 1985 1973 1974, 1975, 1983 1984, 1985, 1986, 1988, 1989 2003: Ford Escort Mexico Challenge; British Saloon Car Championship; BSCC - Class C BSCC - Class B BSCC / BTCC - Class A Britcar

Andrew Ernest Rouse (born 2 December 1947) is a British racing driver, most notably in the British Saloon Car Championship. He won the BSCC in 1975, 1983, 1984 and 1985.

Rouse is one of the most successful drivers ever to appear in the BSCC. His 60 overall wins in the category was the highest total by any driver for many years, until being overhauled by Jason Plato at Brands Hatch in the opening round of the 2011 season.

== Early career ==
Rouse was born in Dymock, Gloucestershire. Coming from an engineering background, he was originally an apprentice with an agricultural engineering company. He had been interested in motor sport from an early age and had run self-built autograss specials in his teens and then Formula Ford. In 1971, he funded his racing activities by working for Broadspeed, the race car engineering company set-up by Brummie Ralph Broad. Rouse's combined engineering and driving talent soon became apparent to Broad, who then encouraged his motorsport career by providing him with assistance to race in other championships.

Rouse's first step into saloon car racing came in 1972, when he entered the Ford Escort Mexico series. He won this one-make championship in his first year, and soon stepped up into the British Saloon Car Championship. Over the following years, Rouse was successful in a number of Broadspeed entered cars (including Ford Escorts, Triumph Dolomite Sprints and Ford Capris) winning his class in 1973, 1974 and taking the title in 1975.

In 1976, Broadspeed ran the works Jaguar XJ12C cars, for which Rouse was both driver and race development engineer. Great results were expected from these powerful cars but unfortunately British Leyland stopped the program the following season following a string of poor results. With no works deal for 1978, Ralph Broad sold his stake in the company and Broadspeed soon went into liquidation. Rouse drove alongside Gordon Spice in 1979 and 80, getting good results in the works Ford Capri team.

== Andy Rouse Engineering ==
In 1981, Rouse set up his own engineering company, Andy Rouse Engineering, taking many of the ex-Broadspeed employees with him. His success on the track continued with Championship wins in 1983 and 1984. His 1983 win came about after Steve Soper, driving a works Austin Rover prepared by the TWR team had his championship win disqualified. Rouse took over the Alfa Romeo GTV6 entered by Pete Hall's Industrial Control Services (ICS) plc company, won his class and latterly the championship, and also founded the long running sponsorship deal between himself and ICS. He also won the Willhire 24 Hour in 1981 and 1983. After competing in a Rover Vitesse in 1984 and winning the title against the factory Rover team, Ford gave him the 'works' contract to build and drive their next generation touring car, the Sierra Cosworth, which was to dominate the BTCC until the end of the decade. Rouse won the championship again in 1985 driving a Sierra XR4Ti, but this was to be his last overall title. For 1987, Ford homologated the Sierra RS500, and ARE set about transforming it into a BTCC machine. The result was one of the most famous touring cars of all time. Rouse never won the title outright in an RS500, although he won Class A again in 1988 and 1989. He was third overall in 1988, 1989 and 1990.

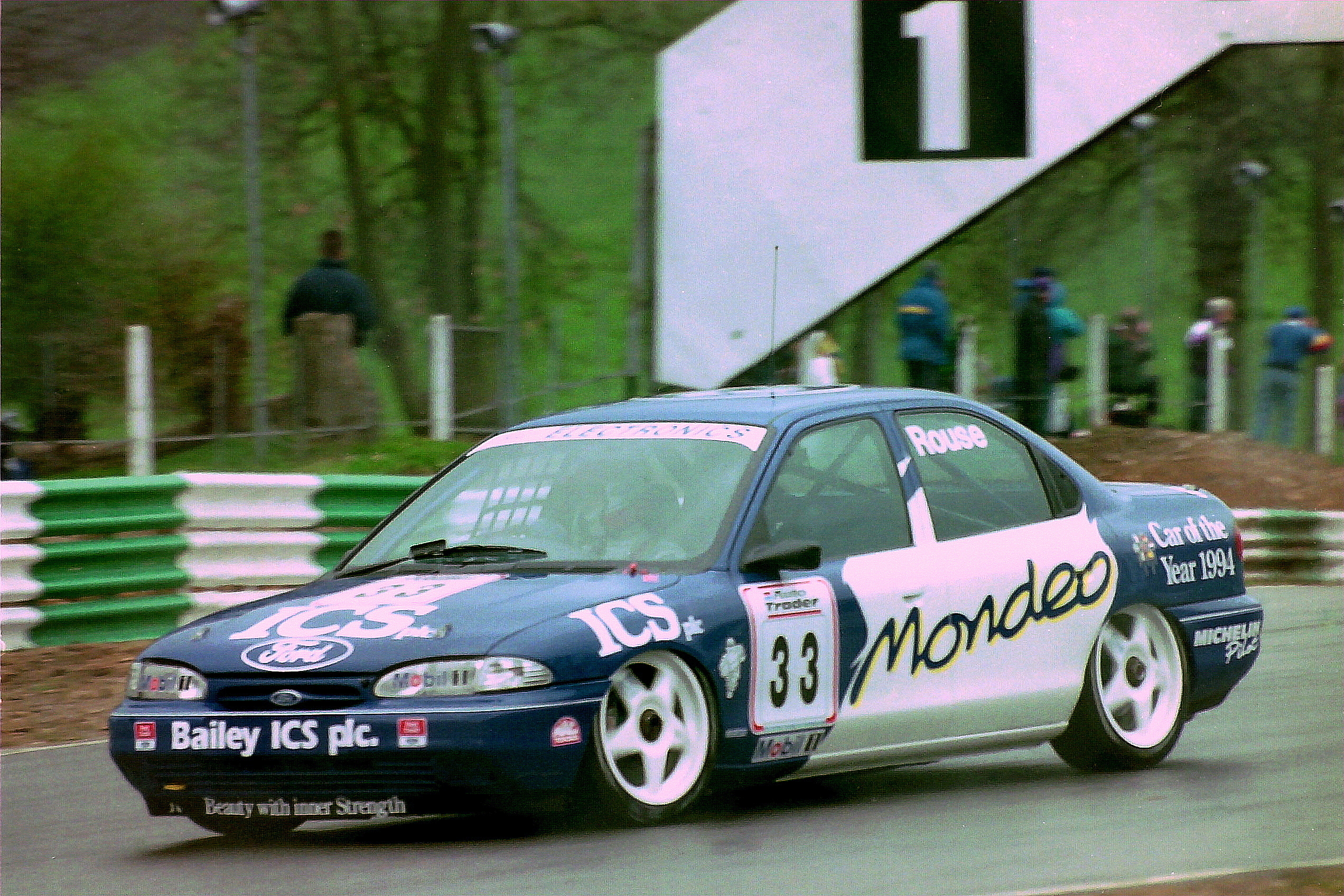
Rouse driving for Ford at Brands Hatch during the 1994 British Touring Car Championship season.

As a prelude to the new 2.0 litre formula for 1991, Rouse built a 2.0 Sierra Sapphire run under the Hawaiian Tropic banner, driven first by Ray Bellm and then Chris Hodgetts. The car was not very successful, but it did give useful experience for the super touring era to come. For 1991, ARE picked up the works contract to run the Toyota team. The car was a success, challenging for the 1991 title. In 1992 Rouse was joined by Will Hoy, again running the Toyota Carina, before setting up the works Ford Mondeo team for 1993, hiring Paul Radisich to drive alongside himself. The Mondeo was the class of the field in the second half of the 1993 season, but had to give best in 1994 to Alfa Romeo. He retired from driving at the end of 1994, hiring Kelvin Burt as Paul's teammate for 1995. That year was frustrating, and Ford gave the works contract to West Surrey Racing for the following season. Rouse instead ran a semi-works Nissan team in 1996, running Gary Ayles and Owen McAuley with limited success. Rouse later built a Super Touring specification Toyota Corolla which failed to find a racing team.

Since the demise of his touring car teams, Rouse spent several years trying to promote a rival series to the BTCC; his proposed "Supercar V8" was based on a spaceframe chassis, normally aspirated V8 engine, and bodywork modelled on medium to large saloon cars. This series has not yet materialised.

Rouse has since wound down Andy Rouse Engineering and retired from motor racing. He now runs a commercial real estate business and restores Cadillac vehicles.

Rouse's son Julian is a director of the Arden International racing team.

In 2003, Andy and Julian won the 2003 Britcar season in a Mercedes 190 DTM. Julian continued to race in Britcar and even competed in the 24 Hours of Silverstone a few times.

In 2005, a poll by readers of Motorsport Magazine voted Rouse the third greatest touring car driver ever.

== Racing record ==
=== Complete British Saloon / Touring Car Championship results ===
(key) (Races in bold indicate pole position – 1973–1990 in class) (Races in italics indicate fastest lap – 1 point awarded ?–1989 in class)

Year	Team	Car	Class	1	2	3	4	5	6	7	8	9	10	11	12	13	14	15	16	17	18	19	20	21	DC	Pts	Class
1973	Team Esso Uniflo	Ford Escort RS 1600	C	BRH ovr:3 cls:2	SIL ovr:2 cls:1	THR; Ret	THR ovr:7 cls:2	SIL ovr:5 cls:2	ING ovr:? cls:?	BRH ovr:2† cls:1†		BRH ovr:2 cls:1													4th	45	**1st**
1973	Broadspeed & Ford of Britain / Belgium	Ford Capri RS 2600	D								SIL; Ret														4th	45	NC
1974	Team Broadspeed Castrol	Triumph Dolomite Sprint	B	**MAL** ovr:1† cls:1†	BRH ovr:13 cls:3	SIL ovr:8 cls:1	OUL ovr:6 cls:1	THR ovr:4 cls:1	SIL; DSQ	THR ovr:3 cls:1	BRH ovr:4 cls:1	**ING** ovr:3† cls:3†	BRH ovr:3† cls:3†	OUL; Ret	SNE ovr:1† cls:1†	BRH ovr:? cls:?									**2nd**	**67**	**1st**
1975	Triumph Team Piranha	Triumph Dolomite Sprint	B	**MAL** ovr:1† cls:1†	BRH ovr:3 cls:1	OUL ovr:1† cls:1†	THR ovr:2 cls:1	SIL ovr:6 cls:1	BRH ovr:2† cls:2†	THR ovr:4 cls:1	SIL ovr:1† cls:1†	MAL ovr:1† cls:1†	SNE; Ret	SIL ovr:3 cls:1	ING ovr:2† cls:1†	**BRH** ovr:1† cls:1†	OUL ovr:3 cls:2	BRH ovr:4 cls:1							**1st**	**78**	**1st**
1976	Broadspeed/British Leyland	Triumph Dolomite Sprint	C	**BRH** ovr:9 cls:5	SIL; Ret	OUL ovr:5† cls:1†	THR; Ret	**THR** ovr:2 cls:1	SIL ovr:4 cls:2	BRH; Ret	MAL ovr:7† cls:2†	SNE ovr:2† cls:1†	BRH ovr:3 cls:2												7th	47	**2nd**
1978	BMW (GB)	BMW 520i	D	SIL; Ret	OUL ovr:8† cls:7†	THR ovr:9 cls:6	BRH; Ret†	SIL	DON	MAL															NC	0	NC
1978	Carrier Properties Ltd.	Ford Capri III 3.0s	D								BRH; Ret	DON ovr:5† cls:5†	BRH ovr:? cls:?	THR ovr:4 cls:4	OUL ovr:2† cls:3†										NC	0	NC
1979	Browne & Day	Ford Capri III 3.0s	D	SIL	OUL	THR	SIL	DON	SIL; Ret	MAL	DON	BRH	THR	SNE	OUL										NC	0	NC
1980	Gordon Spice Racing	Ford Capri III 3.0s	D	**MAL** ovr:1† cls:1†	OUL ovr:2† cls:2†	THR ovr:6 cls:5	SIL ovr:1 cls:1	SIL ovr:1 cls:1	BRH ovr:4 cls:4	MAL ovr:2† cls:2†	BRH ovr:2 cls:2	THR ovr:2 cls:2	SIL ovr:2 cls:2												4th	64	**2nd**
1981	CSH Racing with Esso	Ford Capri III 3.0s	D	**MAL** ovr:1† cls:1†	SIL ovr:1 cls:1	OUL ovr:3† cls:2†	THR ovr:3 cls:3	BRH; Ret†	SIL ovr:3 cls:3	SIL ovr:3 cls:3	DON ovr:3† cls:2†	BRH ovr:5 cls:4	THR ovr:5 cls:4	SIL; Ret											8th	49	**3rd**
1982	Gordon Spice Racing	Ford Capri III 3.0s	D	SIL ovr:2 cls:2	MAL ovr:4† cls:4†	OUL ovr:3† cls:3†	THR ovr:3 cls:3	THR ovr:2 cls:2	SIL ovr:3 cls:3	DON ovr:3 cls:3	BRH; Ret	DON ovr:2 cls:2	BRH; Ret	**SIL** ovr:3 cls:3											9th	41	**3rd**
1983	Industrial Control Services Ltd.	Alfa Romeo GTV6	B	SIL	OUL	THR	BRH ovr:3 cls:1	THR ovr:4 cls:1	SIL ovr:5 cls:1	DON ovr:4 cls:1	SIL; Ret	DON ovr:7 cls:2	BRH ovr:8 cls:1	SIL ovr:7 cls:1											**1st**	**61**	**1st**
1984	Industrial Control Services Ltd.	Rover Vitesse	A	DON ovr:1 cls:1	**SIL**; Ret	OUL ovr:2 cls:2	**THR** ovr:1 cls:1	**THR** ovr:2 cls:2	SIL ovr:1 cls:1	**SNE** ovr:1 cls:1	BRH ovr:1 cls:1	BRH ovr:2 cls:2	DON ovr:1 cls:1	**SIL** ovr:1 cls:1											**1st**	**81**	**1st**
1985	Industrial Control Services Ltd.	Ford Sierra XR4Ti	A	SIL	OUL ovr:1 cls:1	THR; Ret	DON ovr:1 cls:1	**THR** ovr:1 cls:1	SIL ovr:1 cls:1	**DON** ovr:1 cls:1	SIL ovr:1 cls:1	SNE ovr:1 cls:1	BRH ovr:2 cls:2	BRH ovr:1 cls:1	**SIL** ovr:1 cls:1										**1st**	**86**	**1st**
1986	Industrial Control Services Ltd.	Ford Sierra XR4Ti	A	**SIL** ovr:1 cls:1	**THR** ovr:2 cls:2	**SIL** ovr:1 cls:1	**DON** ovr:1 cls:1	BRH; Ret	**SNE**; Ret	**BRH** ovr:1 cls:1	**DON** ovr:1 cls:1	**SIL**; Ret													**3rd**	**57**	**1st**
1987	ICS plc	Ford Sierra RS Cosworth	A	**SIL** ovr:1 cls:1	OUL	THR	**THR** ovr:1 cls:1	**SIL**; Ret	SIL	**BRH** ovr:3 cls:3	SNE	DON													8th	35	**3rd**
1987	ICS plc	Ford Sierra RS500	A										**OUL**; Ret‡	**DON** ovr:1 cls:1	SIL										8th	35	**3rd**
1988	Kaliber Racing	Ford Sierra RS500	A	**SIL** ovr:16 cls:6	**OUL** ovr:1 cls:1	THR ovr:2 cls:2	**DON** ovr:1 cls:1	**THR** ovr:1 cls:1	**SIL** ovr:1 cls:1	**SIL** ovr:1 cls:1	**BRH** ovr:1 cls:1	**SNE** ovr:1 cls:1	**BRH** ovr:1 cls:1	BIR; C	DON ovr:1 cls:1	**SIL** ovr:10 cls:7									**3rd**	**95**	**1st**
1989	Kaliber Racing	Ford Sierra RS500	A	**OUL**; Ret	**SIL** ovr:1 cls:1	**THR**; Ret	DON; Ret	THR ovr:1 cls:1	**SIL** ovr:3 cls:3	**SIL** ovr:1 cls:1	BRH ovr:2 cls:2	SNE ovr:2 cls:2	**BRH** ovr:1 cls:1	BIR ovr:1 cls:1	DON ovr:3 cls:3	SIL ovr:1 cls:1									**3rd**	**78**	**1st**
1990	ICS plc	Ford Sierra RS500	A	OUL ovr:1 cls:1	DON ovr:1 cls:1	THR ovr:10 cls:7	**SIL** ovr:3 cls:3	OUL ovr:2 cls:2	SIL ovr:2 cls:2	BRH; Ret	SNE ovr:16 cls:6	BRH ovr:2 cls:2	BIR ovr:1 cls:1	**DON** ovr:2 cls:2	THR ovr:1 cls:1	SIL ovr:2 cls:2									**3rd**	**173**	**2nd**
1991	Kaliber ICS Team Toyota	Toyota Carina		SIL; 5	SNE; 3	DON; 9	THR; 8	SIL; 4^{1}	BRH; 3	SIL; 7	DON; 1; 1	**DON**; **2**; 1	OUL; 4	**BRH**; **1**; 1	**BRH**; **2** Ret	DON; Ret	THR; 4	**SIL**; 2							**3rd**	**115**	
1992	Team Securicor ICS Toyota	Toyota Carina		SIL; 2	THR; 2	OUL; 1	SNE; 4	BRH; Ret	DON; 1; 3	DON; 2 Ret	SIL; Ret	KNO; 1; 3	KNO; 2; 4	PEM; 13	BRH; 1; 3	BRH; 2; 4	DON; 6	**SIL**; 1							5th	128	
1993	Team Mondeo	Ford Mondeo Si		SIL	DON	SNE	DON	OUL	BRH; 1	BRH; 2	PEM; Ret	SIL; Ret	KNO; 1; 16	KNO; 2; 10	OUL; Ret	BRH; 6	THR; 3	DON; 1 DSQ	DON; 2; 4	SIL; 2					11th	41	
1994	Team Mondeo	Ford Mondeo Ghia		THR; 21	BRH; 1; 4	BRH; 2; 3	SNE; DNS	SIL; 1; 4	SIL; 2; 19	OUL; Ret	DON; 1; 4	DON; 2; 6	BRH; 1; 6	BRH; 2; 5	SIL; Ret	KNO; 1; 11	KNO; 2; 15	OUL; Ret	BRH; 1; 11	BRH; 2 DNS	SIL; 1; 13	SIL; 2; 8	DON; 1; 20	DON; 2; 10	11th	66	

1. – Race was stopped due to heavy rain. No points were awarded.

† Events with 2 races staged for the different classes.

‡ Endurance driver.

=== Complete 24 Hours of Spa results ===
Year	Team	Co-Drivers	Car	Class	Laps	Pos.	Class Pos.
1974	(United Kingdom) Team Butch Broadspeed	(United Kingdom) Tony Dron	Triumph Dolomite Sprint	Div.3	280	5th	3rd
1980	(Belgium) Belga Castrol Team	(Belgium) Thierry Tassin	Ford Capri III 3.0	serT+2.5	415	7th	6th
1987	(United Kingdom) Andy Rouse Engineering	(United Kingdom) Win Percy (Belgium) Thierry Tassin	Ford Sierra RS Cosworth	Div.3	252/rim failure	DNF	DNF

=== Complete 24 Hours of Le Mans results ===
Year	Team	Co-Drivers	Car	Class	Laps	Pos.	Class Pos.
1980	(Germany) Porsche System	(United Kingdom) Tony Dron (Germany) Eberhard Draun (DNS)	Porsche 924 Carrera GT	GTP	311	5th	3rd
1981	(Germany) Porsche System	(Liechtenstein) Manfred Schurti (Germany) Siegfried Brunn (DNS)	Porsche 924 Carrera GT	IMSA GTO	316	11th	1st
1982	(Germany) Porsche System	(United Kingdom) Richard Lloyd	Porsche 924 Carrera GT	IMSA GTO	77/gearbox	DNF	DNF

=== Complete World Touring Car Championship results ===
(key) (Races in bold indicate pole position) (Races in italics indicate fastest lap)

Year	Team	Car	1	2	3	4	5	6	7	8	9	10	11	DC	Pts
1987	(United Kingdom) Andy Rouse Engineering	Ford Sierra RS Cosworth	**MNZ**; Ret	JAR ovr:14 cls:3	DIJ ovr:5 cls:3	NUR ovr:8 cls:2	SPA; Ret							25th	58
1987	(United Kingdom) Andy Rouse Engineering	Ford Sierra RS500						BNO; Ret	SIL; Ret				FJI ovr:2 cls:2	25th	58
1987	(Australia) Allan Moffat Enterprises	Ford Sierra RS500								BAT; Ret	CLD; Ret	WEL		25th	58

=== Complete Bathurst 1000 results ===
Year	Team	Co-Drivers	Car	Class	Laps	Pos.	Class Pos.
1987	(Australia) Allan Moffat Enterprises	(Belgium) Thierry Tassin (Canada) Allan Moffat	Ford Sierra RS500	1	31	DNF	DNF
1989	(Australia) Mobil 1 Racing	(Australia) Peter Brock	Ford Sierra RS500	A	81	DNF	DNF
1990	(Australia) Mobil 1 Racing	(Australia) Peter Brock	Ford Sierra RS500	1	160	4th	4th

Awards and achievements
Preceded by Johnny Dumfries	Autosport; National Racing Driver of the Year; 1985	Succeeded by Andy Wallace
Sporting positions
Preceded by Bernard Unett	British Touring Car Champion; 1975	Succeeded by Bernard Unett
Preceded by Win Percy	British Touring Car Champion; 1983–1985	Succeeded by Chris Hodgetts
