= Chris Hodgetts =

British racing driver (born 1950)

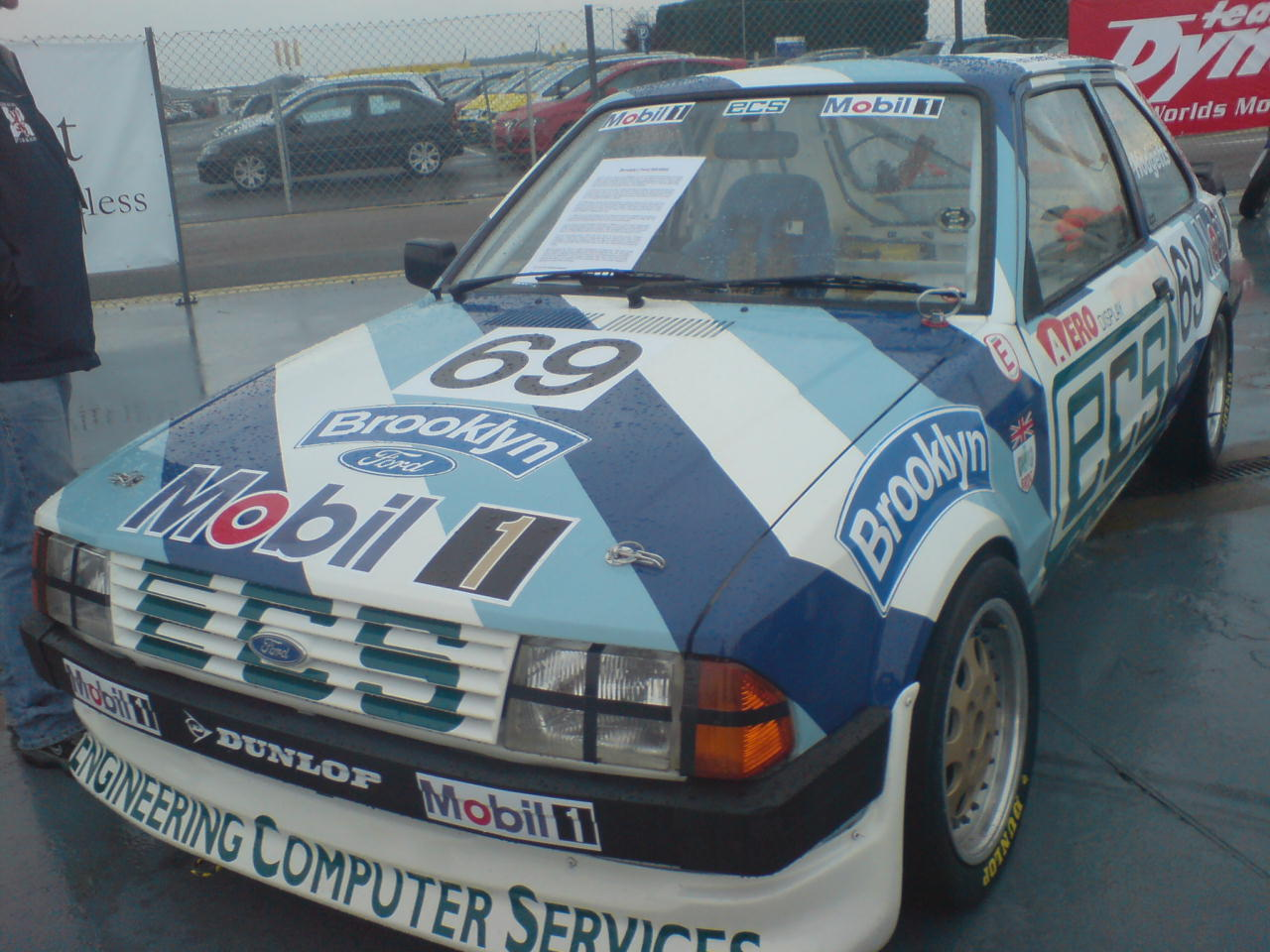
- Hodgetts' 1985 British Saloon Car Championship Ford Escort RS1600
- Nationality: (United Kingdom) British
- Born: Christopher Leonard Hodgetts; 6 December 1950 (age 75) Tanworth-in-Arden, Warwickshire, England

British Saloon / Touring Car Championship
- Years active: 1980–1990
- Teams: Chris Hodgetts Motorsport; MIL Motorsport; Brooklyn Motorsport; Team Toyota GB; Demon Tweeks; JQF Engineering; Vauxhall; Hawaiian Tropic
- Starts: 101
- Wins: 3 (36 in class)
- Poles: 3 (42 in class)
- Fastest laps: 6 (31 in class)
- Best finish: 1st in 1986, 1987

Championship titles
- 1986, 1987 1980, 1981 1985, 1986 1987: British Touring Car Championship; BSCC - Class B BSCC - Class C BTCC - Class D

Christopher Leonard Hodgetts (born 6 December 1950 in Tanworth-in-Arden, Warwickshire) is a British former racing driver. He began his racing career in 1979, driving in the Clubman Class A championship.

== BTCC career ==
Hodgetts debuted in the British Touring Car Championship in 1980. His first overall podium place came in 1981 when he came second. He was consistent in the top five after that, mostly driving for the works Toyota team. He came fourth in 1983, fifth in 1984, second in 1985, before winning the series in 1986 and 1987 at the wheel of a Group A Toyota Corolla AE86. The 1988 season was not a success. The new Group A Toyota Supra needed a lot of development and only a handful of good results were gained. His last race in the BTCC was in 1990. That season, he drove for the works Vauxhall team, helping to develop the new Vauxhall Cavalier. Towards the end of the year he switched to a Ford Sierra, before calling time on his BTCC career. During the 1989 season, Hodgetts was driving for Brooklyn in an iconic red Ford Sierra RS500.

== After the BTCC ==
Besides racing in touring cars, Hodgetts also found success in sports car racing. He shared the BRDC C2 Championship with Tim Harvey in 1989 before retiring and won the TVR Tuscan Challenge in 1990. The 1994 season saw Chris in the Rover Turbo Challenge. He also drove in the World Sportscar Championship on occasion and had seven starts in the 24 Hours of Le Mans, representing team such as Mazdaspeed, Courage Compétition and Spice Engineering. He had a best finish of seventh place overall in the classic 24 hour race. In 1995 he won the GT2 title in the British GT Championship, driving a Marcos LM600. He retired after 1998, when he drove a Lola in the ISRS.

Hodgetts now works for Racing Team & Drivers as a driver instructor. His son Stefan raced in the BTCC in 2004.

== Racing record ==
=== Complete British Saloon / Touring Car Championship results ===
(key) (Races in bold indicate pole position – 1980–1990 in class) (Races in italics indicate fastest lap – 1 point awarded ?–1989 in class)

Year	Team	Car	Class	1	2	3	4	5	6	7	8	9	10	11	12	13	DC	Pts	Class
1980	Hughes of Beaconsfield	Toyota Celica GT	B	**MAL** ovr:3† cls:3†	OUL ovr:1† cls:1†	THR ovr:14 cls:4	SIL ovr:9 cls:1	SIL ovr:7 cls:1	BRH; DSQ	MAL; Ret	BRH	THR; Ret	SIL ovr:14 cls:2				6th	45	**1st**
1981	Hughes of Beaconsfield	Toyota Celica GT	B	**MAL**; Ret†	SIL; Ret	OUL ovr:1† cls:1†	THR ovr:11 cls:1	BRH ovr:8† cls:4†	SIL ovr:12 cls:1	SIL ovr:11 cls:1	**DON** ovr:1† cls:1†	BRH ovr:8 cls:1	THR ovr:? cls:4	SIL ovr:7 cls:2			**2nd**	**74**	**1st**
1982	Chris Hodgetts	Toyota Corolla GT	B	SIL	MAL	OUL	THR	THR	SIL	DON; Ret	BRH; Ret	DON	BRH	SIL			NC	0	NC
1983	Brooklyn Motorsport	Ford Escort RS1600i	C	SIL ovr:13 cls:7	OUL ovr:14 cls:6	THR ovr:13 cls:5	BRH; Ret	THR ovr:12 cls:4	SIL ovr:7 cls:1	DON; Ret	SIL ovr:13 cls:3	DON ovr:9 cls:2	BRH ovr:11 cls:1	SIL ovr:10 cls:1			**3rd**	**43**	**2nd**
1984	Brooklyn Motorsport	Ford Escort RS1600i	C	DON ovr:10 cls:1	SIL ovr:11 cls:2	OUL ovr:11 cls:2	THR; Ret	THR; Ret	SIL ovr:? cls:2	SNE ovr:13 cls:3	BRH ovr:11 cls:1	BRH; Ret	DON ovr:16 cls:4	SIL; Ret			5th	45	**2nd**
1985	Brooklyn Motorsport / ECS	Ford Escort RS1600i	C	SIL ovr:10 cls:2	OUL ovr:9 cls:2	THR ovr:9 cls:3	DON ovr:10 cls:1	THR ovr:7 cls:1	SIL ovr:13 cls:3	DON ovr:14 cls:1	SIL ovr:13 cls:1	SNE ovr:10 cls:1	BRH ovr:8 cls:1	BRH ovr:10 cls:1	SIL; DNS		**2nd**	**77**	**1st**
1986	Team Toyota GB/Duckhams	Toyota Corolla GT	C	SIL ovr:9 cls:1	THR ovr:4 cls:1	SIL ovr:7 cls:1	DON ovr:4 cls:1	BRH ovr:12 cls:1	SNE ovr:7 cls:1	BRH ovr:5 cls:2	DON ovr:7 cls:1	SIL ovr:8 cls:1					**1st**	**85**	**1st**
1987	Chris Hodgetts Motor Sport	Toyota Corolla	D	SIL ovr:8 cls:1	OUL ovr:8 cls:1	THR ovr:5 cls:1	THR ovr:11 cls:2	SIL ovr:9 cls:1	SIL ovr:12 cls:1	BRH ovr:7 cls:1	SNE ovr:7 cls:1	DON ovr:9 cls:1	OUL ovr:3/5‡ cls:1/2‡	DON ovr:8 cls:1	SIL		**1st**	**84**	**1st**
1988	MIL Motorsport	Toyota Supra Turbo	A	SIL ovr:8 cls:4	OUL; Ret	THR	DON; Ret	THR ovr:12 cls:10	SIL; Ret	SIL	BRH						33rd	7	13th
1988	Brooklyn Motorsport	Ford Sierra RS500	A										BRH ovr:7 cls:7	BIR; C	DON ovr:3 cls:3	SIL; Ret	33rd	7	13th
1988	Demon Tweeks	BMW M3	B									SNE; Ret					NC	0	NC
1989	Brooklyn Motorsport	Ford Sierra RS500	A	OUL ovr:8 cls:7	SIL ovr:6 cls:6	THR; Ret	DON; DNQ	THR; Ret	SIL ovr:7 cls:7	SIL ovr:8 cls:8	BRH	SNE	BRH	BIR ovr:4 cls:4	DON ovr:11 cls:11		40th	6	14th
1989	JQF Engineering	Ford Sierra RS500	A													SIL ovr:5 cls:5	40th	6	14th
1990	Vauxhall Motorsport	Vauxhall Cavalier	B	OUL	DON; Ret‡	THR	SIL	OUL ovr:15 cls:7	SIL ovr:12 cls:5	BRH; Ret	SNE ovr:11 cls:6	BRH	BIR ovr:8 cls:3	DON			16th	46	9th
1990	Hawaiian Tropic	Ford Sierra Sapphire	B												THR ovr:7 cls:3	SIL ovr:13 cls:7	16th	46	9th

† Events with 2 races staged for the different classes.

‡ Endurance driver.

Sporting positions
Preceded by Andy Rouse	British Touring Car Champion; 1986–1987	Succeeded by Frank Sytner
