= Charles Sawyer-Hoare =

British racing driver (born 1942)

Charles Sawyer-Hoare (born 21 April 1942) is a British former racing driver. He competed in Formula Three, before switching to saloon car racing with the European Touring Car Championship as well as the British Touring Car Championship.

== Racing record ==
=== Complete British Saloon Car Championship results ===
(key) (Races in bold indicate pole position; races in italics indicate fastest lap.)

Year	Team	Car	Class	1	2	3	4	5	6	7	8	9	10	11	12	Pos.	Pts	Class
1977	Charles Sawyer-Hoare	Renault 5 TS	A	SIL	BRH ?	OUL ?†	THR ?	SIL	THR	DON	SIL	DON	BRH	THR	BRH	NC	0	NC
1980	Charles Sawyer-Hoare	Ford Capri III 3.0s	D	MAL	OUL; 10	THR; Ret	SIL; 6	SIL; 8	BRH; 11	MAL	BRH; Ret	THR	SIL; 8			35th	3	11th
1981	CSH Racing with Esso and the Daily Mirror	Ford Capri III 3.0s	D	MAL; 9†	SIL; 7	OUL; Ret†	THR; 10	BRH	SIL; 9	SIL; 7	DON; 7†	BRH; 11	THR; 9	SIL; 5		28th	5	9th
1982	Equipe Esso	Ford Capri III 3.0s	D	SIL; Ret	MAL; 5†	OUL; 12†	THR; 6	THR	SIL; Ret	DON	BRH; 7	DON	BRH	SIL; 6		32nd	4	10th
1983	Equipe Esso / Daily Mirror	Rover Vitesse	A	SIL; 4	OUL; DNS	THR; 3	BRH; Ret	THR; 3	SIL; 4	DON; 8	SIL; 8	DON; Ret	BRH; 7	SIL; Ret		14th	16	**2nd**
1984	Equipe Esso / Daily Mirror	Rover Vitesse	A	DON	SIL; Ret	OUL; DNS	THR	THR	SIL	SNE	BRH; Ret	BRH; Ret	DON	SIL; Ret		NC	0	NC

† Events with 2 races staged for the different classes.
