= Pete Lovett =

British racing driver (born 1950)

- Nationality: (United Kingdom) British
- Born: 6 March 1950 (age 76) Leicester, Leicestershire, England

British Saloon Car Championship
- Years active: 1977–1978, 1980–1984, 1986
- Teams: Martin Thomas; Dick Lovett Specialist Cars; Tom Walkinshaw Racing; Hughes of Beaconsfield
- Starts: 42
- Wins: 8 (1 in class)
- Poles: 5
- Fastest laps: 4
- Best finish: 6th in 1981

Championship titles
- 1981: British Saloon Car Championship - Class D

Peter Charles Lovett (born 6 March 1950) is a retired British racing driver and businessman. He is perhaps best known for his racing exploits in the TWR run Rover SD1 in the early 1980s.

== Racing career ==
Lovett's debut in racing was in 1976 driving a Porsche, and then contested sportscar endurance events. He competed five times at the Le Mans 24 Hour between 1978 and 1982, but failed to finish any of the events due to mechanical difficulties.

Lovett made the switch to saloon car racing and made his debut in the British Touring Car Championship driving a Triumph Dolomite, before being picked up by the factory Austin Rover team. The Rover SD1 was the class of the field and Lovett took several wins between 1981 and 84, winning his class in 1981, and then finishing runner up in class to his team mate Jeff Allam in 1982. In 1983, he was in contention for the title alongside his team mates Allam and Steve Soper. Soper just pipped him to the championship, but then the Rover team was disqualified from the results for technical infringements. As well as racing in Britain Lovett drove for TWR in Europe, driving in the ETCC and also contesting the Spa 24 Hours race alongside his regular team mates.

Lovett made his final appearance in the BTCC in 1986 before retiring from motorsport to concentrate solely on his business interests.

== Later career ==
Lovett's father founded his first car dealership in 1966. When he retired, Peter became chairman of Dick Lovett Cars, and owns a string of car dealerships across the south of England, catering for marques such as Ferrari, Porsche, Aston Martin, Jaguar Land Rover, Mercedes-Benz and BMW.

== Racing record ==
=== Complete British Saloon Car Championship results ===
(key) (Races in bold indicate pole position; races in italics indicate fastest lap.)

Year	Team	Car	Class	1	2	3	4	5	6	7	8	9	10	11	12	DC	Pts	Class
1977	Martin Thomas	Triumph Dolomite Sprint	C	SIL	BRH	OUL	THR	SIL	THR	DON	SIL	DON	BRH	THR	BRH ?	NC	0	NC
1978	Dick Lovett Specialist Cars	Triumph Dolomite Sprint	C	SIL; 7	OUL	THR ?	BRH; 8†	SIL ?†	DON ?†	MAL	BRH; 10	DON	BRH	THR	OUL; 8†	11th	30	**3rd**
1980	TWR Pentax	Mazda RX-7	C	MAL	OUL	THR	SIL	SIL<	BRH	MAL	BRH; 8	THR; 8	SIL; 9			19th	16	4th
1981	TWR - Daily Express	Rover 3500S	D	MAL; 5†	SIL	OUL	THR	BRH; 4†	**SIL**; 1	**SIL**; 1	DON; 2†	BRH; 3	THR; 3	SIL; 2		6th	52	**1st**
1982	Team Sanyo Racing with Esso	Rover 3500S	D	SIL	MAL	OUL	THR	THR; 7	SIL; 9	**DON**; 4	BRH; 1	DON; 5	BRH; 10	SIL; 1		16th	27	5th
1983	Team Sanyo Racing with Esso	Rover Vitesse	A	SIL; 3	OUL; 2	THR; 1	BRH; Ret	**THR**; 1	SIL; 2	DON; 1	**SIL**; 2	DON; Ret	BRH; 1	SIL; 4		**DSQ**	**63**	**DSQ**
1984	Team Sanyo Racing with Esso	Rover Vitesse	A	DON; 4	SIL; 2	OUL; 3	THR; 3	THR	SIL	SNE	BRH	BRH	DON	SIL		NC	0	NC
1986	Hughes of Beaconsfield	Toyota Celica Supra	A	SIL; 4	THR	SIL	DON	BRH	SNE	BRH	DON	SIL				27th	3	11th

† Events with 2 races staged for the different classes.
