= 1984 British Saloon Car Championship =

27th season of the British Touring Car Championship

Seasons
- ← 1983 1985 →

The 1984 RAC Trimoco British Saloon Car Championship was the 27th season of the championship. The title was won by Andy Rouse in a Rover Vitesse, claiming his third BSCC title.

== Teams & Drivers ==
Team	Car	No.	Drivers	Rounds
Class A
Dennis Leech	Rover Vitesse	4	(United Kingdom) Dennis Leech	1–2, 6, 8
BMW GB Ltd.	BMW 635CSi	5	(United Kingdom) Vince Woodman	1, 3–5, 8–11
BMW GB Ltd.	BMW 635CSi	6	(United Kingdom) James Weaver	All
Industrial Control Services Ltd.	Rover Vitesse	7	(United Kingdom) Andy Rouse	All
Sytner BMW Racing with GSi	BMW 635CSi	8	(United Kingdom) David Sutherland	10
Sytner BMW Racing with GSi	BMW 635CSi	9	(United Kingdom) Frank Sytner	All
Team Sanyo Racing with Esso; TWR – Austin Rover Fleet	Rover Vitesse	10	(United Kingdom) Pete Lovett	1–4
Team Sanyo Racing with Esso; TWR – Austin Rover Fleet	Rover Vitesse	10	(France) Jean-Louis Schlesser	5–6
Team Sanyo Racing with Esso; TWR – Austin Rover Fleet	Rover Vitesse	11	(United Kingdom) Tony Pond	1–6
Team Sanyo Racing with Esso; TWR – Austin Rover Fleet	Rover Vitesse	20	(United Kingdom) Steve Soper	1, 5
Burlington Wallcoverings Ltd.	Ford Capri III 3.0S	12	(United Kingdom) Mike Newman	2–3, 5, 7–11
Equipe Esso/Daily Mirror	Rover Vitesse	13	(United Kingdom) Charles Sawyer-Hoare	2–3, 8–9, 11
Team Toyota GB/ Hughes of Beaconsfield	Toyota Celica Supra	14	(United Kingdom) Win Percy	1, 3–5, 8–11
Team Toyota GB/ Hughes of Beaconsfield	Toyota Celica Supra	14	(United Kingdom) Tony Dron	2
Team Toyota GB/ Hughes of Beaconsfield	Toyota Celica Supra	14	(United Kingdom) Gordon Spice	6–7
Grundig International/ BS Automotive	BMW 635CSi	16	(Republic of Ireland) David Kennedy	10–11
Grundig International/ BS Automotive	BMW 635CSi	17	(Republic of Ireland) David Kennedy	2–9
Colt Cars Dealer Racing Team	Mitsubishi Starion Turbo	18	(United Kingdom) Dave Brodie	1, 3–11
Linden Racing/ Connells Estate Agents	Rover Vitesse	21	(United Kingdom) Neil McGrath	6–11
Brian Chatfield	Ford Capri III 3.0S	23	(United Kingdom) Brian Chatfield	8
Albert Mirko Racing	BMW 635CSi	?	(United Kingdom) Albert Mirko	8
Class B
Napolina Alfa Romeo Dealer Team; The Canned Salmon Bureau	Alfa Romeo GTV6	30	(United Kingdom) Jon Dooley	All
Napolina Alfa Romeo Dealer Team; The Canned Salmon Bureau	Alfa Romeo GTV6	32	(United Kingdom) Rob Kirby	All
Hampshires of Dorking	Vauxhall Astra GTE	31	(United Kingdom) Andrew Thorpe	1–2, 8
John Morris	Volkswagen Scirocco GTI 1.8	33	(United Kingdom) John Morris	1–8, 11
Computervision Racing with Esso	MG Metro Turbo	34	(United Kingdom) Patrick Watts	1–6
Computervision Racing with Esso	MG Metro Turbo	35	(United Kingdom) Robin Brundle	1–6
Klaxon Neiman	MG Metro Turbo	36	(United Kingdom) Paul Taft	4–6
Klaxon Neiman	MG Metro Turbo	43	(United Kingdom) Paul Taft	2–3
Hamish Irvine	Mazda RX-7	37	(United Kingdom) Hamish Irvine	8
Graham Goode Racing	Nissan Bluebird Turbo	38	(United Kingdom) Graham Goode	All
Terry Drury Racing	Alfa Romeo GTV6	40	(United Kingdom) Phil Dowsett	All
Terry Drury Racing	Alfa Romeo GTV6	41	(United Kingdom) Paul Smith	All
Terry Drury Racing	Alfa Romeo GTV6	42	(United Kingdom) Terry Drury	7–9
Demon Tweeks Racing	Volkswagen Golf GTI 1.8	?	(United Kingdom) Alan Minshaw	10–11
Class C
Ordibel UK Ltd.	Volkswagen Golf GTI	51	(United Kingdom) Alan Greehalgh	1–9, 11
Napolina Alfa Romeo Dealer Team; The Canned Salmon Bureau	Alfa Romeo Alfasud Ti	57	(United Kingdom) John Myerscough	2–3, 8
Royal Mail Datapost	Ford Escort RS1600i	66	(United Kingdom) Alan Curnow	All
Royal Mail Datapost	Ford Escort RS1600i	77	(United Kingdom) Richard Longman	All
Brooklyn Motorsport	Ford Escort RS1600i	69	(United Kingdom) Chris Hodgetts	All
Julian May Racing	Ford Escort RS1600i	70	(United Kingdom) Jock Robertson	4–11
Universal Grinding/ John Maguire Racing	Ford Escort RS1600i	72	(United Kingdom) Rob Hall	2–11
Barry Lee Racing	Ford Escort RS1600i	84	(United Kingdom) Barry Lee	1–6, 8

== Calendar & Winners ==
All races were held in the United Kingdom. Overall winners in **bold**.

Round	Circuit	Date	Class A Winner	Class B Winner	Class C Winner
1	Donington Park, Leicestershire	25 March	(United Kingdom) **Andy Rouse**	(United Kingdom) Patrick Watts	(United Kingdom) Chris Hodgetts
2	Silverstone Circuit, Northamptonshire	1 April	(United Kingdom) **Tony Pond**	(United Kingdom) Patrick Watts	(United Kingdom) Richard Longman
3	Oulton Park, Cheshire	20 April	(United Kingdom) **James Weaver**	(United Kingdom) Robin Brundle	(United Kingdom) Richard Longman
4	Thruxton Circuit, Hampshire	23 April	(United Kingdom) **Andy Rouse**	(United Kingdom) Patrick Watts	(United Kingdom) Richard Longman
5	Thruxton Circuit, Hampshire	28 May	(United Kingdom) **Steve Soper**	(United Kingdom) Jon Dooley	(United Kingdom) Alan Greenhalgh
6	Silverstone Circuit, Northamptonshire	10 June	(United Kingdom) **Andy Rouse**	(United Kingdom) Graham Goode	(United Kingdom) Alan Curnow
7	Snetterton Motor Racing Circuit, Norfolk	1 July	(United Kingdom) **Andy Rouse**	(United Kingdom) Jon Dooley	(United Kingdom) Rob Hall
8	Brands Hatch, Kent	22 July	(United Kingdom) **Andy Rouse**	(United Kingdom) Phil Dowsett	(United Kingdom) Chris Hodgetts
9	Brands Hatch, Kent	27 August	(United Kingdom) **Win Percy**	(United Kingdom) Graham Goode	(United Kingdom) Richard Longman
10	Donington Park, Leicestershire	16 September	(United Kingdom) **Andy Rouse**	(United Kingdom) Graham Goode	(United Kingdom) Richard Longman
11	Silverstone Circuit, Northamptonshire	7 October	(United Kingdom) **Andy Rouse**	(United Kingdom) Phil Dowsett	(United Kingdom) Richard Longman

== Championship Standings ==
=== Drivers' Championship ===
Points were awarded on a 9, 6, 4, 3, 2, 1 basis to the top six finishers in each class, with one bonus point for the fastest lap in each class. A driver's best nine scores counted towards the championship, dropped scores are shown in brackets. Positions are shown as overall/class.

Pos	Driver	Class	DON	SIL	OUL	THR	THR	SIL	SNE	BRA	BRA	DON	SIL	Pts
1	(United Kingdom) Andy Rouse	A	1/1	**Ret**	(2/2)	**1/1**	**2/2**	1/1	**1/1**	1/1	2/2	1/1	**1/1**	81
2	(United Kingdom) Richard Longman	C	(16/4)	10/1	10/1	**12/1**	(**Ret**)	**?/4**	12/2	13/3	13/1	13/1	**12/1**	74
3	(United Kingdom) Jon Dooley	B	12/3	Ret	Ret	19/9	8/1	12/2	**7/1**	8/2	**8/2**	9/2	11/4	51
4	(United Kingdom) Phil Dowsett	B	Ret	Ret	14/4	10/3	9/2	Ret	8/2	6/1	9/3	10/3	8/1	48
5	(United Kingdom) Chris Hodgetts	C	**10/1**	**11/2**	**11/2**	Ret	Ret	?/2	**13/3**	**11/1**	**Ret**	**16/4**	Ret	45
6	(United Kingdom) Alan Curnow	C	15/3	13/3	(18/4)	Ret	17/4	?/1	15/4	12/2	14/2	15/3	14/3	43
7	(United Kingdom) Graham Goode	B	18/6	14/5	12/2	13/5	Ret	11/1	Ret	**Ret**	7/1	**6/1**	**DSQ**	40
8	(United Kingdom) Rob Hall	C		15/4	19/5	16/2	16/3	Ret	11/1	14/4	Ret	14/2	17/5	35
9	(United Kingdom) Rob Kirby	B	11/2	9/3	16/5	11/4	Ret	?/5	10/4	Ret	12/5	11/4	9/2	31
10	(United Kingdom) Alan Greenhalgh	C	14/2	Ret	15/3	Ret	12/1	Ret	DNP	Ret	15/3		13/2	30
11	(United Kingdom) Frank Sytner	A	5/5	3/3	7/7	4/4	5/5	3/3	2/2	Ret	6/6	3/3	3/3	30
12	(United Kingdom) Win Percy	A	6/6		4/4	Ret	Ret			**Ret**	**1/1**	**2/2**	2/2	27
13	(United Kingdom) James Weaver	A	8/8	8/6	**1/1**	Ret	DNS	4/4	Ret	2/2	4/4	Ret	4/4	26
14	(United Kingdom) Paul Smith	B	17/5	12/4	(17/6)	14/6	14/5	?/3	9/3	Ret	10/4	12/5	10/3	25
15	(United Kingdom) Jock Robertson	C				17/3	15/2	?/3	Ret	15/5	16/4	Ret	15/4	22
16	(United Kingdom) John Morris	B	13/4	Ret	13/3	15/7	13/4	?/4	14/5	Ret			Ret	15
17	(United Kingdom) Dave Brodie	A	Ret		DNS	9/7	Ret	7/7	16/7	3/3	3/3	4/4	DSQ	11
18	(Republic of Ireland) David Kennedy	A		NC	DNS	5/5	6/6	10/10	3/3	7/6	17/8	Ret	5/5	10
19	(United Kingdom) Vince Woodman	A	DNS		5/5	6/6	7/7			4/4	5/5	7/6	6/6	10
20	(United Kingdom) Mike Newman	A		5/5	8/8		11/8		6/6	5/5	Ret	Ret	7/7	5
21	(United Kingdom) Hamish Irvine	B								10/3				4
22	(United Kingdom) Gordon Spice	A						6/6	4/4					4
23	(United Kingdom) Neil McGrath	A						9/9	5/5	?/?	11/7	5/5	Ret	4
24	(United Kingdom) Tony Dron	A		4/4										3
25	(United Kingdom) Andrew Thorpe	B	19/7	NC						18/4				3
26	(United Kingdom) Barry Lee	C	Ret	Ret	Ret	DNS	18/5	DNS		16/6				3
27	(United Kingdom) John Myerscough	C		16/5	Ret					?/?				2
28	(United Kingdom) Alan Minshaw	B										Ret	16/5	2
29	(United Kingdom) Dennis Leech	A	7/7	Ret				8/8		Ret				0
30	(United Kingdom) David Sutherland	A										8/7		0
31	(United Kingdom) Brian Chatfield	A								9/7				0
32	(United Kingdom) Albert Mirko	A								17/8				0
33	(United Kingdom) Terry Drury	B							?/?	Ret	Ret			0
NC	(United Kingdom) Charles Sawyer-Hoare	A		Ret	DNS					Ret	Ret		Ret	0
WD	(United Kingdom) Patrick Watts	B	**9/1**	**6/1**	**DNS**	**7/1**	**Ret**	Ret						0
WD	(United Kingdom) Tony Pond	A	**3/3**	1/1	6/6	2/2	3/3	**5/5**						0
WD	(United Kingdom) Robin Brundle	B	Ret	7/2	9/1	8/2	10/3	NC						0
WD	(United Kingdom) Pete Lovett	A	4/4	2/2	3/3	3/3								0
WD	(United Kingdom) Steve Soper	A	2/2				1/1							0
WD	(France) Jean-Louis Schlesser	A					4/4	2/2						0
WD	(United Kingdom) Paul Taft	B		Ret	Ret	18/8	Ret	**?/6**						0
Pos	Driver	Class	DON	SIL	OUL	THR	THR	SIL	SNE	BRA	BRA	DON	SIL	Pts

Colour	Result
Gold	Winner
Silver	Second place
Bronze	Third place
Green	Points classification
Blue	Non-points classification
Blue	Non-classified finish (NC)
Purple	Retired, not classified (Ret)
Red	Did not qualify (DNQ)
Red	Did not pre-qualify (DNPQ)
Black	Disqualified (DSQ)
White	Did not start (DNS)
White	Withdrew (WD)
White	Race cancelled (C)
Blank	Did not practice (DNP)
Blank	Did not arrive (DNA)
Blank	Excluded (EX)

**Bold** - Pole in class
Italics - Fastest lap in class
