= 1981 British Saloon Car Championship =

24th season of the British Touring Car Championship

Seasons
- ← 1980 1982 →

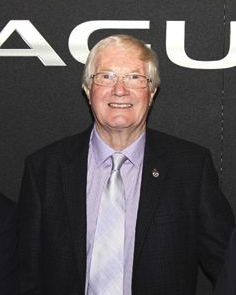
Win Percy successfully defended his title to become the 1981 BSCC champion.

The 1981 RAC Tricentrol British Saloon Car Championship was the 24th season of the championship. Win Percy won his second consecutive drivers title in his Mazda RX-7.

== Teams and drivers ==
Team	Car	No.	Drivers	Class	Rounds
Gordon Spice Racing	Ford Capri III 3.0S	1	(United Kingdom) Gordon Spice	D	1–4, 6–11
Gordon Spice Racing	Ford Capri III 3.0S	2	(United Kingdom) Stuart Graham	D	1–2
Gordon Spice Racing	Ford Capri III 3.0S	2	(United Kingdom) Phil Martin-Dye	D	3–11
Equipe Esso VMW Motors	Ford Capri III 3.0S	3	(United Kingdom) Vince Woodman	D	All
Equipe Esso VMW Motors	Ford Capri III 3.0S	4	(United Kingdom) Jonathan Buncombe	D	2, 4, 6–7, 10
CSH Racing with Esso and the Daily Mirror	Ford Capri III 3.0S	5	(United Kingdom) Charles Sawyer-Hoare	D	1–4, 6–11
CSH Racing with Esso and the Daily Mirror	Ford Capri III 3.0S	6	(United Kingdom) Andy Rouse	D	All
Patrick Motorsport	Rover 3500 S	7	(Australia) Brian Muir	D	All
Patrick Motorsport	Rover 3500 S	8	(United Kingdom) Rex Greenslade	D	All
Patrick Motorsport	Rover 3500 S	63	(South Africa) Rad Dougall	D	11
TWR – Daily Express; Mazda Motorsport/TWR; Team BP	Rover 3500 S	9	(United Kingdom) Jeff Allam	D	All
TWR – Daily Express; Mazda Motorsport/TWR; Team BP	Rover 3500 S	10	(United Kingdom) Pete Lovett	D	1, 5–11
TWR – Daily Express; Mazda Motorsport/TWR; Team BP	Mazda RX-7	20	(United Kingdom) Win Percy	C	1–10
TWR – Daily Express; Mazda Motorsport/TWR; Team BP	Mazda RX-7	25	(United Kingdom) Barry Sheene	C	1
TWR – Daily Express; Mazda Motorsport/TWR; Team BP	Mazda RX-7	25	(United Kingdom) Chuck Nicholson	C	8–11
TWR – Daily Express; Mazda Motorsport/TWR; Team BP	Audi 80 GLE	42	(United Kingdom) Martin Brundle	B	All
TWR – Daily Express; Mazda Motorsport/TWR; Team BP	Audi 80 GLE	43	(United Kingdom) Stirling Moss	B	All
Bestmoor Silencers	Ford Capri III 3.0S	11	(United Kingdom) Graham Goode	D	1, 3–4, 6–8, 11
Dennis Leech	Ford Capri III 3.0S	13	(United Kingdom) Dennis Leech	D	2–5, 8–10
Track Marshall	Ford Capri III 3.0S	15	(United Kingdom) Chuck Nicholson	D	1–7
Richard Grant Racing	Ford Capri III 3.0S	16	(United Kingdom) Mike Kimpton	D	1, 3–8
Richard Grant Racing	Ford Capri III 3.0S	47	(United Kingdom) Nick Whiting	D	1–8, 10
Carroll Shelby	Ford Capri III 3.0S	19	(United Kingdom) Wayne Wainwright	D	2–5, 8
Unknown	Ford Capri III 3.0S	40	(United Kingdom) Tony Sugden	D	8
Castrol Denmark	Ford Escort RS2000	96	(Denmark) Erik Høyer	C	5
John Bishop	Triumph Dolomite Sprint	79	(United Kingdom) John Bishop	C	5, 7, 10
Mike Buckley	Ford Escort RS2000	66	(United Kingdom) Mike Buckley	C	1–7, 9–11
James Burrows	Toyota Celica 2000 LB	74	(United Kingdom) James Burrows	C	3–4, 6, 8–11
Terry Nightingale	Triumph Dolomite Sprint	92	(United Kingdom) Terry Nightingale	C	5–9
Ian Stirling	Talbot Avenger	23	(United Kingdom) Ian Stirling	C	8
Hughes of Beaconsfield	Toyota Celica ST	40	(United Kingdom) Chris Hodgetts	B	All
Hughes of Beaconsfield	Toyota Corolla GT	79	(United Kingdom) Jonathan Buncombe	B	8
Hughes of Beaconsfield	Toyota Corolla GT	79	(United Kingdom) Gordon Mayers	B	9
Hughes of Beaconsfield	Toyota Corolla GT	79	(United Kingdom) Dave Brodie	B	10–11
Morris Vulcan Ltd.	Volkswagen Golf GTI	44	(United Kingdom) John Morris	B	All
Napolina Alfa Romeo Dealer Team	Alfa Romeo Alfasud Sprint	51	(United Kingdom) Rob Kirby	B	2–9, 11
Napolina Alfa Romeo Dealer Team	Alfa Romeo Alfasud Ti	81	(United Kingdom) Jon Dooley	A	All
Unknown	Mitsubishi Lancer GSR	56	(United Kingdom) Barrie Williams	B	All
Unknown	Mitsubishi Lancer GSR	57	(United Kingdom) Dave Morgan	B	All
Andy Driver	Volkswagen Golf GTI	66	(United Kingdom) Andy Driver	B	1, 3–6, 9, 11
Peter Buxtorf	Volkswagen Scirocco GTI	69	(Switzerland) Peter Buxtorf	B	1–8
Demon Tweeks	Volkswagen Golf GTI	54	(United Kingdom) Alan Minshaw	B	2, 5–8, 10
Robin Carlisle	Toyota Celica LB	76	(United Kingdom) Robin Carlisle	B	5, 8–9, 11
Bill Postins	Volkswagen Scirocco GTI	62	(United Kingdom) Bill Postins	B	8
John Spiller	Talbot Sunbeam TI	82	(United Kingdom) John Spiller	B	1–2, 4, 6, 8–9
John Tait	Toyota Celica GT	84	(United Kingdom) John Tait	B	1–2, 6, 8–9, 11
Terry Watts	Talbot Sunbeam TI	48	(United Kingdom) Terry Watts	B	8
Team Datapost Racing with Hepolite and Esso	Austin Metro 1300 HLS	70	(United Kingdom) Alan Curnow	A	All
Team Datapost Racing with Hepolite and Esso	Austin Metro 1300 HLS	77	(United Kingdom) Richard Longman	A	All
Team Datapost Racing with Hepolite and Esso	Austin Metro 1300 HLS	57	(United Kingdom) Tim Goss	A	10
P.J. Green Racing	Mini 1275GT	74	(United Kingdom) Tim Goss	A	1–8
Julian May Racing	Ford Fiesta 1.3	80	(United Kingdom) Terry Nightingale	A	1–2, 4
Julian May Racing	Ford Fiesta 1.3	80	(United Kingdom) Alex Moss	A	5
Julian May Racing	Ford Fiesta 1.3	80	(United Kingdom) Julian May	A	8
Haynes	Ford Fiesta 1.3	99	(United Kingdom) David da Costa	A	1–7, 9–11
Everest Double Glazing	Austin Metro 1300 HLS	74	(United Kingdom) Neil McGrath	A	5–9, 11
Stuart Fowler	Ford Fiesta 1.3	85	(United Kingdom) Stuart Fowler	A	9
David Grimshaw	Ford Fiesta 1.3	39	(United Kingdom) David Grimshaw	A	7–9
François Hamon	Simca Rallye 3	76	(France) François Hamon	A	8
Colin Hawker	Ford Fiesta 1.3	42	(United Kingdom) Colin Hawker	A	2, 4–5
Sigma	Austin Metro 1300 HLS	87	(United Kingdom) Roger Saunders	A	2–10

Icon	Class
A	Under 1300cc
B	1301–1600cc
C	1601–2500cc
D	2501–3500cc

== Calendar and winners ==
All races were held in the United Kingdom. Overall winners in bold.

Round		Circuit	Date	Class A Winner	Class B Winner	Class C Winner	Class D Winner
1	A	Mallory Park, Leicestershire	22 March	Not contested.		(United Kingdom) Win Percy	(United Kingdom) **Andy Rouse**
1	B	Mallory Park, Leicestershire	22 March	(United Kingdom) Jon Dooley	(United Kingdom) **John Morris**	Not contested.	
2		Silverstone Circuit, Northamptonshire	29 March	(United Kingdom) Alan Curnow	(United Kingdom) Martin Brundle	(United Kingdom) Mike Buckley	(United Kingdom) **Andy Rouse**
3	A	Oulton Park, Cheshire	17 April	Not contested.		(United Kingdom) **Win Percy**	(United Kingdom) Gordon Spice
3	B	Oulton Park, Cheshire	17 April	(United Kingdom) Jon Dooley	(United Kingdom) **Chris Hodgetts**	Not contested.	
4		Thruxton Circuit, Hampshire	20 April	(United Kingdom) Richard Longman	(United Kingdom) Chris Hodgetts	(United Kingdom) Win Percy	(United Kingdom) **Vince Woodman**
5	A	Brands Hatch, Kent	25 May	Not contested.		(United Kingdom) Win Percy	(United Kingdom) **Nick Whiting**
5	B	Brands Hatch, Kent	25 May	(United Kingdom) Neil McGrath	(United Kingdom) **Barrie Williams**	Not contested.	
6		Silverstone Circuit, Northamptonshire	21 June	(United Kingdom) Neil McGrath	(United Kingdom) Chris Hodgetts	(United Kingdom) Win Percy	(United Kingdom) **Pete Lovett**
7		Silverstone Circuit, Northamptonshire	18 July	(United Kingdom) Jon Dooley	(United Kingdom) Chris Hodgetts	(United Kingdom) Win Percy	(United Kingdom) **Pete Lovett**
8	A	Donington Park, Leicestershire	16 August	Not contested.		(United Kingdom) **Win Percy**	(United Kingdom) Pete Lovett
8	B	Donington Park, Leicestershire	16 August	(United Kingdom) Richard Longman	(United Kingdom) **Chris Hodgetts**	Not contested.	
9		Brands Hatch, Kent	31 August	(United Kingdom) Richard Longman	(United Kingdom) Chris Hodgetts	(United Kingdom) Win Percy	(United Kingdom) **Jeff Allam**
10		Thruxton Circuit, Hampshire	20 September	(United Kingdom) Richard Longman	(United Kingdom) Martin Brundle	(United Kingdom) Win Percy	(United Kingdom) **Jeff Allam**
11		Silverstone Circuit, Northamptonshire	4 October	(United Kingdom) Jon Dooley	(United Kingdom) John Morris	(United Kingdom) Mike Buckley	(United Kingdom) **Jeff Allam**

== Championship standings ==
=== Drivers' Championship ===
Points were awarded on a 9, 6, 4, 3, 2, 1 basis to the top six finishers in each class, with one bonus point for the fastest lap in each class. In races where a class had less than four starters, points would be awarded to the top two finishers (6 & 4 respectively) with one point for the fastest lap. A driver's best nine scores counted towards the championship, dropped scores are shown in brackets. Positions are shown as overall/class.

Pos	Driver	Class	MAL		SIL^{1}	OUL^{2}		THR	BRA		SIL	SIL	DON		BRA	THR	SIL	Pts
1	(United Kingdom) Win Percy	C	**2/1**		(**Ret**)	**1/1**		**4/1**	**2/1**		**4/1**	**4/1**	**1/1**		**2/1**	**2/1**		78
2	(United Kingdom) Chris Hodgetts	B		(**Ret**)	**Ret**		1/1	**11/1**		8/4	**12/1**	**?/1**		**1/1**	**8/1**	?/4	7/2	74
3	(United Kingdom) Jon Dooley	A		**4/1**	13/2		4/1	**?/2**		**6/3**	?/2	**?/1**		(10/4)	(**16/3**)	?/3	10/1	65
4	(United Kingdom) John Morris	B		1/1	8/2		?/?	?/2		5/3	13/2	?/2		2/2	9/2	(?/3)	6/1	60
5	(United Kingdom) Richard Longman	A		Ret	15/3		13/5	?/1		7/4	?/?	?/2		6/1	14/1	?/1	**11/2**	58
6	(United Kingdom) Pete Lovett	D	5/4						**4/3**		**1/1**	**1/1**	2/1		3/2	3/2	2/2	52
7	(United Kingdom) Jeff Allam	D	8/7		4/4	Ret		5/4	3/2		Ret	2/2	**Ret**		**1/1**	1/1	1/1	50
8	(United Kingdom) Andy Rouse	D	**1/1**		1/1	3/2		3/3	Ret		3/3	3/3	3/2		5/4	5/4	Ret	49
9	(United Kingdom) Alan Curnow	A		Ret	12/1		6/2	?/3		?/?	?/4	?/6		**7/2**	15/2	**?/2**	12/3	48
10	(United Kingdom) Gordon Spice	D	11/9		**2/2**	**2/1**		**2/2**			2/2	Ret	5/4		4/3	7/6	Ret	38
11	(United Kingdom) Vince Woodman	D	3/2		3/3	4/3		1/1	7/6		5/4	Ret	Ret		Ret	**4/3**	4/4	35
12	(United Kingdom) Neil McGrath	A								3/1	**18/1**	?/3		8/3	DNS		13/4	33
13	(United Kingdom) Dave Morgan	B		Ret	24/?		9/6	18/4		2/2	16/4	?/4		3/3	12/3	?/2	9/4	33
14	(United Kingdom) Mike Buckley	C	10/2		?/1	Ret		?/?	8/2		NC	Ret			23/3	?/3	17/1	31
15	(United Kingdom) Martin Brundle	B		2/2	6/1		12/8	?/5		**Ret**	Ret	Ret		4/4	DSQ	10/1	Ret	30
16	(United Kingdom) Barrie Williams	B		Ret	Ret		3/3	14/3		1/1	Ret	?/3		5/5	13/4	Ret	8/3	30
17	(United Kingdom) Nick Whiting	D	4/3		Ret	5/4		6/5	1/1		6/5	5/4	6/5			16/?		25
18	(United Kingdom) David da Costa	A		5/2	?/4		?/?	?/4		4/2	?/?	Ret			17/4	?/6	16/5	24
19	(United Kingdom) Stirling Moss	B		3/3	22/6		2/2	Ret		Ret	15/3	22/7		9/6	DNS	?/5	14/5	20
20	(United Kingdom) Roger Saunders	A			26/?		10/4	?/6		10/5	?/3	?/4		?/5	19/5	?/5		19
21	(United Kingdom) Chuck Nicholson	C											8/2		6/2	8/2	**Ret**	18
22	(United Kingdom) Tim Goss	A		7/4	?/6		7/3	?/?		11/6	?/?	?/5		?/?		?/4		14
23	(United Kingdom) Rob Kirby	B			?/3		5/4	?/?		9/5	?/5	?/?		?/?	18/5		15/6	14
24	(Switzerland) Peter Buxtorf	B		?/4	?/4		8/5	?/?		?/?	?/?	?/5		Ret				10
25	(United Kingdom) James Burrows	C				?/2		?/?			DNS		Ret		Ret	DNS	21/2	9
26	(United Kingdom) Terry Nightingale	A		6/3	?/5			?/5										8
27	(United Kingdom) Terry Nightingale	C							14/4		?/2	NC	DNS		Ret			7
28	(Australia) Brian Muir	D	Ret		Ret	7/6		9/8	11/8		Ret	?/?	4/3		Ret	Ret	Ret	6
29	(United Kingdom) Jonathan Buncombe	D			5/5			?/?			Ret	6/5				6/5		6
30	(United Kingdom) Charles Sawyer-Hoare	D	9/8		7/6	Ret		10/9			9/8	7/6	7/6		11/7	9/7	5/5	5
31	(United Kingdom) Alan Minshaw	B			21/5					14/6	?/?	?/6		?/?		?/6		5
32	(United Kingdom) John Bishop	C							9/3			NC				Ret		4
33	(South Africa) Rad Dougall	D															**3/3**	4
34	(United Kingdom) Ian Stirling	C											14/3					4
35	(United Kingdom) Phil Martin-Dye	D				11/10		?/?	6/5		10/9	Ret	10/8		7/5	?/?	Ret	4
36	(United Kingdom) John Spiller	B		?/5	DNS			?/6			?/6			?/?	21/7			4
37	(United Kingdom) Chuck Nicholson	D	6/5		?/?	9/8		7/6	13/10		7/6	?/?						4
38	(United Kingdom) Mike Kimpton	D	?/?			?/?		?/?	5/4		14/10	?/?	Ret					3
39	(United Kingdom) Rex Greenslade	D	Ret		14/?	6/5		?/?	10/7		8/7	?/?	Ret		Ret	Ret	Ret	2
40	(Denmark) Erik Høyer	C							15/5									2
41	(United Kingdom) Graham Goode	D	7/6			10/9		8/7			?/?	?/?	9/7				Ret	1
42	(United Kingdom) Robin Carlisle	B								?/?				?/?	20/6		18/7	1
43	(United Kingdom) John Tait	B		?/6	25/?						?/?			?/?	24/8		20/9	1
44	(United Kingdom) Dennis Leech	D			?/?	12/11		?/?	?/?				13/11		10/6	Ret		1
45	(United Kingdom) David Grimshaw	A										Ret		?/?	22/6			1
46	François Hamon	A												?/6				1
47	(United Kingdom) Wayne Wainwright	D			DNS	8/7		?/?	12/9				12/10					0
48	(United Kingdom) Andy Driver	B		DSQ			11/7	?/?		DSQ	?/?				Ret		19/8	0
49	(United Kingdom) Colin Hawker	A			DNS			?/?		12/7								0
50	(United Kingdom) Alex Moss	A								13/8								0
51	(United Kingdom) Tony Sugden	D											11/9					0
52	(United Kingdom) Gordon Mayers	B													25/9			0
53	(United Kingdom) Stuart Graham	D	Ret		?/?													0
54	(United Kingdom) Dave Brodie	B														?/?	**Ret**	0
55	(United Kingdom) Jonathan Buncombe	B												?/?				0
56	(United Kingdom) Bill Postins	B												?/?				0
57	(United Kingdom) Terry Watts	B												?/?				0
NC	(United Kingdom) Barry Sheene	C	Ret															0
NC	(United Kingdom) Stuart Fowler	A													Ret			0
NC	(United Kingdom) Julian May	A												DNS				0
Pos	Driver	Class	MAL		SIL	OUL		THR	BRA		SIL	SIL	DON		BRA	THR	SIL	Pts

Colour	Result
Gold	Winner
Silver	Second place
Bronze	Third place
Green	Points classification
Blue	Non-points classification
Blue	Non-classified finish (NC)
Purple	Retired, not classified (Ret)
Red	Did not qualify (DNQ)
Red	Did not pre-qualify (DNPQ)
Black	Disqualified (DSQ)
White	Did not start (DNS)
White	Withdrew (WD)
White	Race cancelled (C)
Blank	Did not practice (DNP)
Blank	Did not arrive (DNA)
Blank	Excluded (EX)

**Bold** - Pole in class
Italics - Fastest lap in class

Notes:

1. – Class A pole position for round 2 is unknown.
2. – Class A & B pole positions for round 3 are unknown.
