= Broadspeed =

British automobile tuning and engineering company

Broadspeed Engineering Ltd
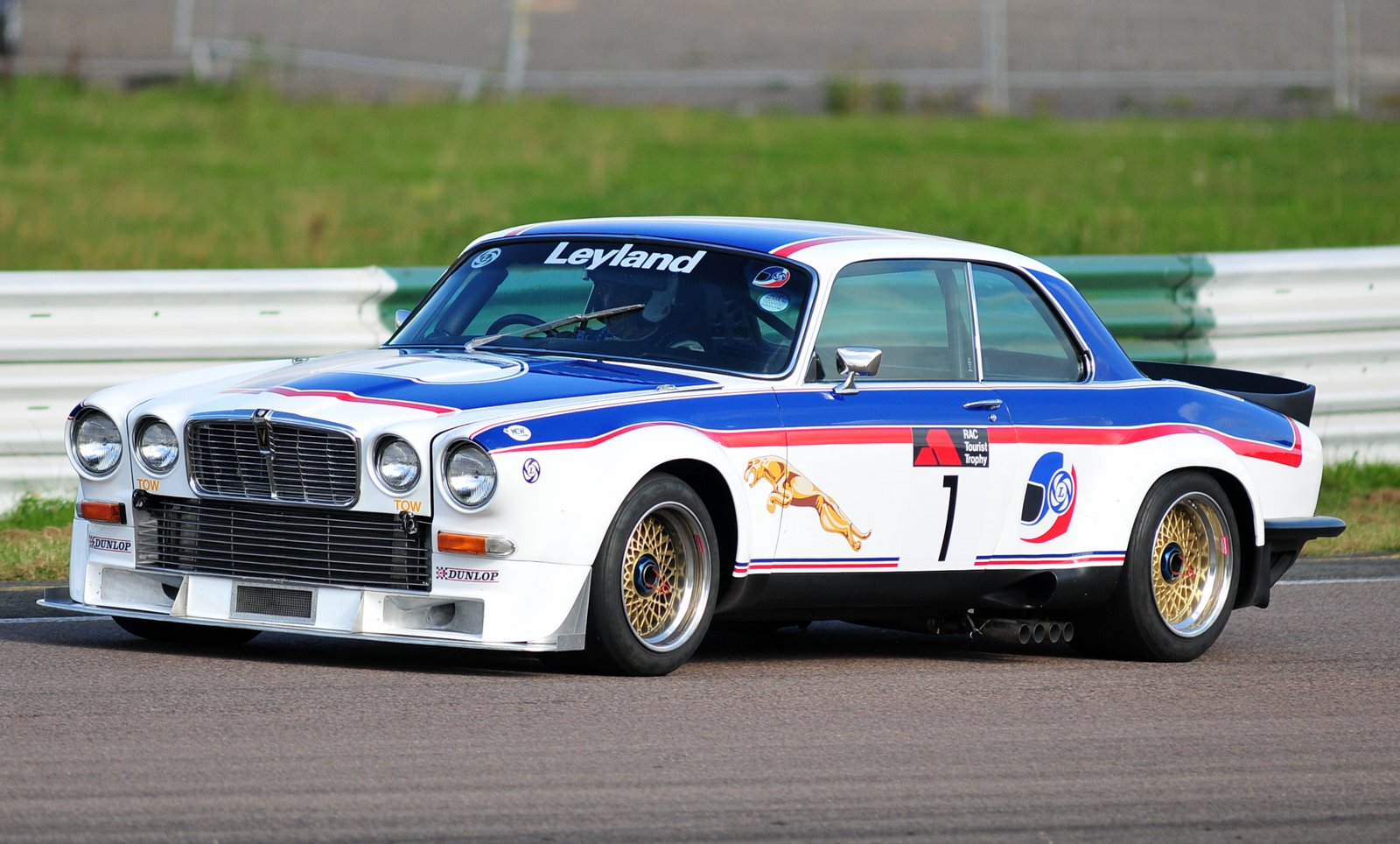
- A Jaguar XJ12C, race prepared by Broadspeed
- Company type: Private
- Industry: Automotive
- Founded: 1962
- Founder: Ralph Broad
- Headquarters: United Kingdom
- Area served: Europe
- Products: Automotive parts, Engine tuning, Car dealership

Broadspeed Engineering Ltd was a British automobile tuning and engineering company that operated from Sparkbrook, Birmingham, England, principally during the 1960s and 1970s. It was started and run by Ralph Broad, and first became well known for its success in campaigning MkI BMC Minis during the early 1960s. The company also offered a variety of different road- and race-tuning packages for BMC and Ford engines.

== History ==
Ralph Broad began racing in 1955, when he was in his late twenties. In 1959, he bought an early BMC Mini and immediately began to see success racing it, which helped him to sell racing conversion packages to other Mini owners. This arrangement developed into the 1962 establishment of Team Broadspeed, for which Broad himself remained one of the drivers. The Broadspeed cars were often seen as being competitive with the factory works Coopers, especially at the hands of John Fitzpatrick, who had become the team's top driver.

In 1965, Broadspeed began to transition its support from BMC to Ford products after Broad was approached by Ford with an offer to begin campaigning the Ford Anglia, and later the Escort. In 1971, John Fitzpatrick would win four British Touring Car Championship races in a Broadspeed Anglia. Eventually, the company also offered engineering consultancy work that led to such creations as a turbocharged version of the Essex V6 engine, which appeared in the TVR M Series. This turbocharged engine was also used in the Broadspeed Bullitt, which was a modified Ford Capri Mk I. Broadspeed became reacquainted with BMC in 1974, by which time the manufacturer had become part of British Leyland. Driver Andy Rouse then won the manufacturer's title in a Triumph Dolomite Sprint.

In 1975, Broad got a contract to prepare Jaguar XJ Series II V12 Coupes for entry in the Group 2 class of the European Touring Car Championship. Despite being well-driven by Andy Rouse and Derek Bell, they were not competitive with the much lighter BMW 3.0L CSL. For financial reasons, British Leyland elected to discontinue support for the Jaguar racing entries in the ETCC, and in 1977 Ralph Broad sold Broadspeed to a former Mini-racing colleague before retiring to Portugal.

While living in Portugal, Broad worked for Fogo Montanha, a manufacturer of woodburning stoves. He died on 17 September 2010.

== Broadspeed GT 2+2 ==
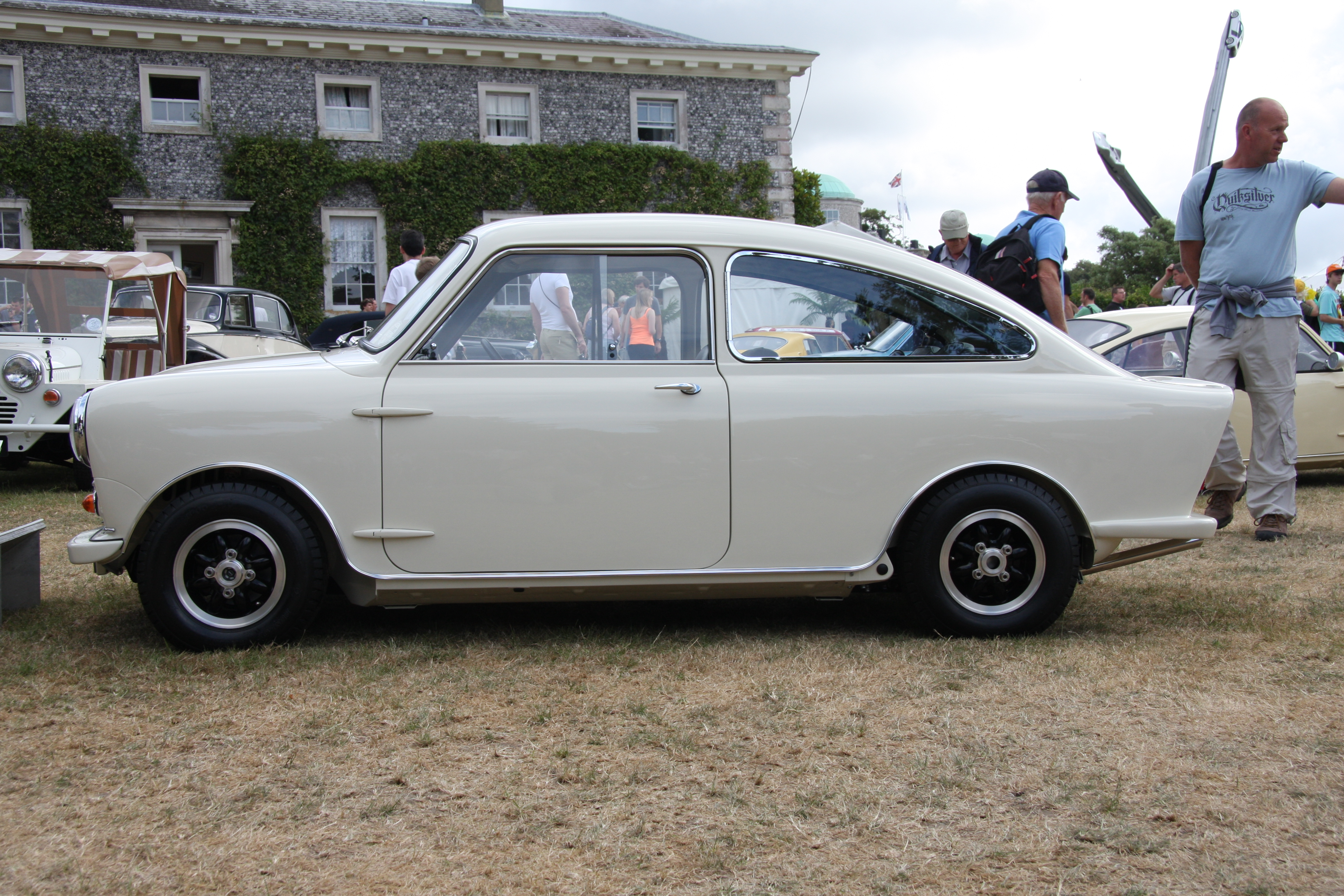
A 1965 Broadspeed GT, showing the elongated body

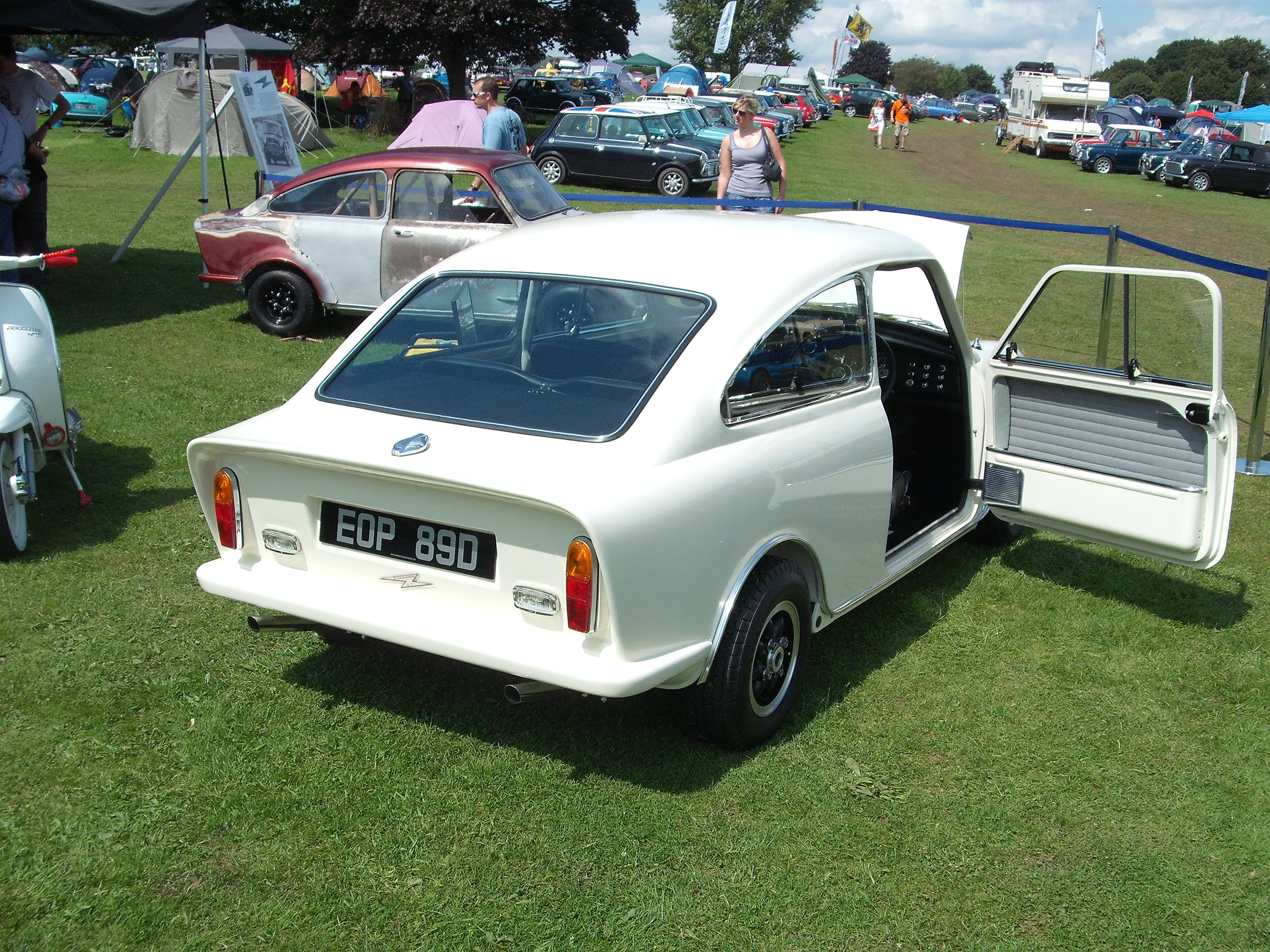
Rear of a Broadspeed GT

In 1966, the company introduced a car which they sold under their own name, the Broadspeed GT 2+2. It was not an entirely new car, but rather a heavily modified Mini with a distinctive aerodynamic tail section made of fiberglass that replaced the original steel bodywork at the rear. The interior of the car was redesigned as well, with Restall front seats and a fold-down rear seat that provided access to the boot, which was no longer accessible from outside the car as a result of the new rear body shell. Mechanically, performance was enhanced with a reworked cylinder head using larger inlet valves and polished tracts, a Broadspeed camshaft, a rear anti-roll bar, and other changes.

The GT 2+2 was available in four different versions that represented different levels of performance, and a total of twenty-eight cars were built before production ended in 1968.
