= Toyota (GB) PLC =

Subsidiary of Toyota in Great Britain

- Company type: Subsidiary
- Industry: Automotive
- Founded: 28 September 1967; 58 years ago
- Headquarters: Burgh Heath, Surrey, United Kingdom
- Area served: United Kingdom, Northern Ireland, Malta
- Key people: Agustín Martín, President and Managing Director
- Products: Automobiles
- Number of employees: 400 (approx)
- Parent: Toyota Motor Corporation
- Divisions: Toyota GB, Lexus Division
- Website: toyota.co.uk

Toyota (GB) PLC is the company responsible for sales, marketing, after sales and customer relations for Toyota and Lexus in the UK, and is therefore responsible for all sales, marketing, after sales and customer relations issues nationwide in the UK.

Employing approximately 400 people, the company’s headquarters are located at Great Burgh, Surrey. An architectural design competition was launched in 1997 managed by RIBA Competitions to design the new HQ. Four architect-led design teams were selected from a list of sixteen practices to take part in the competition. The four teams were chosen following a process that involved interviews, presentations and visits to the architects' completed buildings. Richard Sheppard, Robson & Partners, Architects won the competition and two years later construction started on site. The building has gone on to win a number of awards including the British Council for Offices Award 2001 – Commendation.

As well as receiving vehicles for sale from Toyota Manufacturing UK, cars arrive via sea at a facility at Portbury, near Bristol.

Sales are handled by a national network of around 200 Toyota Centres.
