= 1980 British Saloon Car Championship =

23rd season of the British Touring Car Championship

Seasons
- ← 1979 1981 →

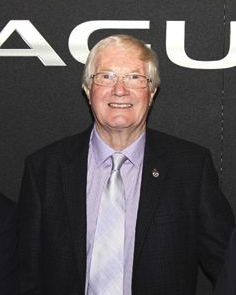
1980 BRSCC champion, Win Percy

The 1980 RAC Tricentrol British Saloon Car Championship was the 23rd season of the championship. The engine capacity limit was raised to 3500cc this year. Win Percy won his first drivers title, driving a TWR prepared Mazda RX-7.

== Calendar & winners ==
All races were held in the United Kingdom. Overall winners in bold.

Round		Circuit	Date	Class A Winner	Class B Winner	Class C Winner	Class D Winner
1	A	Mallory Park, Leicestershire	23 March	Not contested.		(United Kingdom) Win Percy	(United Kingdom) **Andy Rouse**
1	B	Mallory Park, Leicestershire	23 March	(United Kingdom) Jon Mowatt	(United Kingdom) **John Morris**	Not contested.	
2	A	Oulton Park, Cheshire	4 April	Not contested.		(United Kingdom) Win Percy	(United Kingdom) **Gordon Spice**
2	B	Oulton Park, Cheshire	4 April	(United Kingdom) Alan Curnow	(United Kingdom) **Chris Hodgetts**	Not contested.	
3		Thruxton Circuit, Hampshire	7 April	(United Kingdom) Alan Curnow	(United Kingdom) Richard Lloyd	(United Kingdom) Win Percy	(United Kingdom) **Gordon Spice**
4		Silverstone Circuit, Northamptonshire	20 April	(United Kingdom) Alan Curnow	(United Kingdom) Chris Hodgetts	(United Kingdom) Win Percy	(United Kingdom) **Andy Rouse**
5		Silverstone Circuit, Northamptonshire	8 June	(United Kingdom) Alan Curnow	(United Kingdom) Chris Hodgetts	(United Kingdom) Win Percy	(United Kingdom) **Andy Rouse**
6		Brands Hatch, Kent	13 July	(United Kingdom) Alan Curnow	(United Kingdom) John Morris	(United Kingdom) Win Percy	(United Kingdom) **Jeff Allam**
7	A	Mallory Park, Leicestershire	17 August	Not contested.		(United Kingdom) Win Percy	(United Kingdom) **Gordon Spice**
7	B	Mallory Park, Leicestershire	17 August	(United Kingdom) Jon Dooley	(United Kingdom) **Tony Lanfranchi**	Not contested.	
8		Brands Hatch, Kent	25 August	(United Kingdom) Jon Dooley	(United Kingdom) Tony Lanfranchi	(United Kingdom) Win Percy	(United Kingdom) **Gordon Spice**
9		Thruxton Circuit, Hampshire	7 September	(United Kingdom) Alan Curnow	(United Kingdom) Richard Lloyd	(United Kingdom) Win Percy	(United Kingdom) **Gordon Spice**
10		Silverstone Circuit, Northamptonshire	5 October	(United Kingdom) Alan Curnow	(United Kingdom) Tony Lanfranchi	(United Kingdom) Win Percy	(United Kingdom) **Gordon Spice**

== Championship results ==
Driver's championship
Pos.	Driver	Car	Class	Points
1	(United Kingdom) Win Percy	Mazda RX-7	C	90
2	(United Kingdom) Alan Curnow	Ford Fiesta	A	73
3	(United Kingdom) Gordon Spice	Ford Capri	D	67
4	(United Kingdom) Andy Rouse	Ford Capri	D	64
