= 1994 FIA Touring Car World Cup =

Seasons
- ← 1993 1995 →

Layout of the Donington Park

The 1994 FIA Touring Car World Cup was the second running of the FIA Touring Car World Cup. It was held on 16 October 1994 at Donington Park in the United Kingdom. Unlike the previous year's edition, the 1994 event was run over just a single race. Paul Radisich won the event for a second time, while Germany was the winning nation. The winning driver was also awarded the RAC Tourist Trophy, the first time the Trophy had been awarded since 1988.

== Entry list ==
Nation	No	Driver	Entrant	Car	1994 Championship
Belgium	1	Marc Duez	BMW Motorsport	BMW 318i	Belgian Procar Championship
Belgium	2	Thierry Tassin	FINA Team Oreca	BMW 318i	Belgian Procar Championship
Switzerland	3	Alain Menu	Renault Dealer Racing	Renault Laguna	British Touring Car Championship
Switzerland	4	Bernard Thuner	Wira Peugeot	Peugeot 405	Swiss Touring Car Championship
Czech Republic	5	Vaclav Bervid	Bervid Sport Styling	BMW 318i	Super Tourenwagen Cup
Czech Republic	6	Milos Bychl	Bychl-Euro Racing	BMW 318i	Super Tourenwagen Cup
Germany	7	Michael Bartels	Nissan Castrol Racing	Nissan Primera	Super Tourenwagen Cup
Germany	8	Frank Biela	ROC Competition	Audi 80 Quattro	Super Tourenwagen Cup
Germany	9	Markus Oestreich	Wolf Racing	Ford Mondeo	Super Tourenwagen Cup
Germany	10	Hans-Joachim Stuck	ROC Competition	Audi 80 Quattro	Super Tourenwagen Cup
Germany	11	Joachim Winkelhock	BMW Motorsport Team Schnitzer	BMW 318i	British Touring Car Championship
Spain	12	Antonio Albacete	Equipo Banco Central Hispano	Opel Vectra	Spanish Touring Car Championship
Spain	13	Adrián Campos	Alfa Romeo Spain	Alfa Romeo 155	Spanish Touring Car Championship
Spain	14	Carlos Palau	Ford España	Ford Mondeo	Spanish Touring Car Championship
Spain	15	Luis Pérez-Sala	Old Spice Nissan Racing	Nissan Primera	Spanish Touring Car Championship
Spain	16	Luis Villamil	Alfa Romeo Spain	Alfa Romeo 155	Spanish Touring Car Championship
France	18	Philippe Gache	Graff Racing	Ford Mondeo	French Supertouring Championship
France	19	Yvan Muller	FINA Team Oreca	BMW 318i	French Supertouring Championship
(United Kingdom) Great Britain	20	John Cleland	Vauxhall Sport	Vauxhall Cavalier	British Touring Car Championship
(United Kingdom) Great Britain	21	Robb Gravett	Ford Team Mondeo	Ford Mondeo	British Touring Car Championship
(United Kingdom) Great Britain	22	Anthony Reid	HKS Racing	Vauxhall Cavalier	Japanese Touring Car Championship
(United Kingdom) Great Britain	23	Steve Soper	BMW Motorsport Team Schnitzer	BMW 318i	Japanese Touring Car Championship
(United Kingdom) Great Britain	24	Patrick Watts	Peugeot Sport	Peugeot 405	British Touring Car Championship
Italy	25	Stefano Modena	Alfa Corse	Alfa Romeo 155	Italian Superturismo Championship
Italy	26	Emanuele Pirro	Audi Sport Italia	Audi 80 Quattro	Italian Superturismo Championship
Italy	27	Roberto Ravaglia	CiBiEmme Engineering	BMW 318i	Italian Superturismo Championship
Italy	28	Antonio Tamburini	Alfa Corse	Alfa Romeo 155	Italian Superturismo Championship
Italy	29	Gabriele Tarquini	Alfa Corse	Alfa Romeo 155	British Touring Car Championship
Netherlands	30	Jan Lammers	Volvo 850 Racing	Volvo 850	British Touring Car Championship
New Zealand	31	Paul Radisich	Ford Team Mondeo	Ford Mondeo	British Touring Car Championship
Sweden	32	Per-Gunnar Andersson	Peggen Motorsport	BMW 318i	Nordic Touring Car Championship
Sweden	33	Slim Borgudd	Mazda Cars	Mazda Xedos 6	Nordic Touring Car Championship
Venezuela	34	Johnny Cecotto	BMW Motorsport Team Bigazzi	BMW 318i	Super Tourenwagen Cup
South Africa	35	Shaun van der Linde	BMW South Africa	BMW 318i	South African Touring Car Championship
(United Kingdom) not nominated	40	Julian Bailey	Toyota Castrol Team	Toyota Carina	British Touring Car Championship
(United Kingdom) not nominated	41	Tim Harvey	Renault Dealer Team	Renault Laguna	British Touring Car Championship
(United Kingdom) not nominated	42	Will Hoy	Toyota Castrol Team	Toyota Carina	British Touring Car Championship
(United Kingdom) not nominated	43	David Leslie	Renault Dealer Team	Renault Laguna	British Touring Car Championship
(United Kingdom) not nominated	44	Matt Neal	Team Dynamics	Mazda 323F	British Touring Car Championship
(United Kingdom) not nominated	45	Kieth O'Dor	Old Spice Nissan Racing	Nissan Primera	British Touring Car Championship

- Rickard Rydell was unable to compete for Sweden due to a collapsed lung. He would have driven a Volvo 850.
- Alain Cudini appeared on the entry list for France driving an Opel Vectra, but did not participate.

== Report ==
Initially, it was John Cleland that made the best getaway, vaulting from his grid position of fourth to take an early lead from front-row starters Paul Radisich and Steve Soper. Several drivers meanwhile, including Shaun van der Linde, Kieth O’Dor, Jan Lammers, David Leslie and Philippe Gache were eliminated from the race almost immediately after a multi-car collision in the middle of the pack. Later in the lap, Alain Menu clouted the rear of Frank Biela's Audi on the approach to the Melbourne Hairpin, resulting in the Swiss driver's retirement. It was at this point the red flags were shown to allow the numerous stranded cars to be moved.

At the restart, Cleland failed to replicate his excellent start, the top four rounding the first corner in grid order. Stefano Modena rammed the rear of Anthony Reid's Vauxhall at the Esses on the first lap, Modena was out while Reid continued but would retire later in the race due to the damage sustained, whilst Gabriele Tarquini's late braking two corners later at Goddards resulted in the retirement of both Cleland and Emanuele Pirro, both of whom had passed Tarquini at the previous corner. Tarquini continued but lost several positions as he recovered from the grass.

This promoted Tim Harvey into third position behind Radisich and Soper, but his retirement due to head gasket failure ended a miserable day for the Renault team. Biela thus assumed third position from Joachim Winkelhock and Roberto Ravaglia, though the latter would soon lose fifth position after being pressured into out-braking himself at the Esses by a resurgent Tarquini and Yvan Muller. When it missed just 6 laps to the end Winkelhock decided to push out at the Esses his compatriot Biela as the pair battled for third position. This made Biela lose two positions behind Winkelhock and Tarquini, though the German would then beach his Audi in the gravel at Coppice the following lap as he attempted to catch them up .

Radisich was able to maintain his healthy advantage over Soper to secure his second consecutive World Cup, with Winkelhock holding off Tarquini to complete the podium. After Biela's retirement, Hans-Joachim Stuck finished in fifth after qualifying in a lowly 21st, with Johnny Cecotto, Muller and Markus Oestrich rounding out the top eight finishers. Soper and Winkelhock's podium finishes were sufficient for BMW to win the manufacturers title, whilst the efforts of Winkelhock, Stuck and Oestrich secured Germany the Nations Cup.

== Race Results ==
Qualifying

Pos	No	Driver	Car	Lap Time
1	31	(New Zealand) Paul Radisich	Ford Mondeo Ghia	1:38.09
2	23	(United Kingdom) Steve Soper	BMW 318iS	1:38.26
3	29	(Italy) Gabriele Tarquini	Alfa Romeo 155 Ts	1:38.39
4	20	(United Kingdom) John Cleland	Vauxhall Cavalier Gsi	1:38.44
5	41	(United Kingdom) Tim Harvey	Renault Laguna	1:38.49
6	26	(Italy) Emanuele Pirro	Audi 80 Quattro	1:38.49
7	20	(Switzerland) Alain Menu	Renault Laguna	1:38.55
8	22	(United Kingdom) Anthony Reid	Vauxhall Cavalier Gsi	1:38.59
9	25	(Italy) Stefano Modena	Alfa Romeo 155 Ts	1:38.65
10	8	(Germany) Frank Biela	Audi 80 Quattro	1:38.70
11	19	(France) Yvan Muller	BMW 318iS	1:39.07
12	11	(Germany) Joachim Winkelhock	BMW 318iS	1:39.08
13	27	(Italy) Roberto Ravaglia	BMW 318iS	1:39.46
14	1	(Belgium) Marc Duez	BMW 318iS	1:39.46
15	34	(Venezuela) Johnny Cecotto	BMW 318iS	1:39.53
16	9	(Germany) Markus Oestreich	Ford Mondeo Ghia	1:39.60
17	7	(Germany) Michael Bartels	Nissan Primera Gte	1:39.60
18	21	(United Kingdom) Robb Gravett	Ford Mondeo Ghia	1:39.62
19	24	(United Kingdom) Patrick Watts	Peugeot 405 Mi16	1:39.70
20	2	(Belgium) Thierry Tassin	BMW 318iS	1:39.70
21	10	(Germany) Hans Joachim Stuck	Audi 80 Quattro	1:39.73
22	35	(South Africa) Shaun van der Linde	BMW 318iS	1:40.11
23	40	(United Kingdom) Julian Bailey	Toyota Carina E GT	1:40.16
24	18	(France) Philippe Gache	Ford Mondeo Ghia	1:40.21
25	45	(United Kingdom) Kieth O'Dor	Nissan Primera Gte	1:40.29
26	14	(Spain) Carlos Palau	Ford Mondeo Ghia	1:40.31
27	30	(Netherlands) Jan Lammers	Volvo 850 Glt	1:40.59
28	43	(United Kingdom) David Leslie	Renault Laguna	1:40.59
29	42	(United Kingdom) Will Hoy	Toyota Carina E GT	1:41.05
30	13	(Spain) Adrian Campos	Alfa Romeo 155 Ts	1:41.09
31	28	(Italy) Antonio Tamburini	Alfa Romeo 155 Ts	1:41.34
32	12	(Spain) Antonio Albacete	Opel Vectra Gt	1:41.51
33	16	(Spain) Luis Villamil	Alfa Romeo 155 Ts	1:41.58
34	15	(Spain) Luis Perez Sala	Nissan Primera Gte	1:42.07
35	4	(Switzerland) Bernard Thuner	Peugeot 405 Mi16	1:42.12
36	44	(United Kingdom) Matt Neal	Mazda Lantis	1:42.61
37	32	(Sweden) Per-Gunnar Andersson	BMW 318iS	1:42.65
38	6	(Czech Republic) Milos Bychl	BMW 318iS	1:43.52
39	33	(Sweden) Slim Borgudd	Mazda Xedos 6	1:43.56
40	5	(Czech Republic) Vaclav Bervid	BMW 318iS	1:43.87

Race

Pos	No	Driver	Car	Laps	Time/Retired	Grid	Points
1	31	(New Zealand) Paul Radisich	Ford Mondeo Ghia	25	41:56.730	1	40
2	23	(United Kingdom) Steve Soper	BMW 318iS	25	+1.91s	2	30
3	11	(Germany) Joachim Winkelhock	BMW 318iS	25	+7.11s	12	24
4	29	(Italy) Gabriele Tarquini	Alfa Romeo 155 Ts	25	+7.96s	3	20
5	10	(Germany) Hans-Joachim Stuck	Audi 80 Quattro	25	+29.50s	21	16
6	34	(Venezuela) Johnny Cecotto	BMW 318iS	25	+31.22s	15	15
7	19	(France) Yvan Muller	BMW 318iS	25	+32.12s	11	14
8	9	(Germany) Markus Oestreich	Ford Mondeo Ghia	25	+34.56s	16	13
9	1	(Belgium) Marc Duez	BMW 318iS	25	+38.35s	14	12
10	27	(Italy) Roberto Ravaglia	BMW 318iS	25	+40.64s	13	11
11	2	(Belgium) Thierry Tassin	BMW 318iS	25	+41.09s	20	10
12	40	(United Kingdom) Julian Bailey	Toyota Carina E GT	25	+46.02s	23	9
13	21	(United Kingdom) Robb Gravett	Ford Mondeo Ghia	25	+52.63s	18	8
14	42	(United Kingdom) Will Hoy	Toyota Carina E GT	25	+55.39s	29	7
15	24	(United Kingdom) Patrick Watts	Peugeot 405 Mi16	25	+1.01.74s	19	6
16	14	(Spain) Carlos Palau	Ford Mondeo Ghia	25	+1.06.23s	26	5
17	13	(Spain) Adrian Campos	Alfa Romeo 155 Ts	25	+1.17.87s	30	4
18	16	(Spain) Luis Villamil	Alfa Romeo 155 Ts	25	+1.18.54s	33	3
19	15	(Spain) Luis Pérez-Sala	Nissan Primera Gte	25	+1.18.88s	34	2
20	12	(Spain) Antonio Albacete	Opel Vectra Gt	25	+1.21.32s	32	1
21	33	(Sweden) Slim Borgudd	Mazda Xedos 6	24	+1 Lap	39	
22	44	(United Kingdom) Matt Neal	Mazda 323F	24	+1 Lap	36	
23	32	(Sweden) Per-Gunnar Andersson	BMW 318iS	24	+1 Lap	37	
24	28	(Italy) Antonio Tamburini	Alfa Romeo 155 Ts	24	+1 Lap	31	
Ret	8	(Germany) Frank Biela	Audi 80 Quattro	19	Accident	10	
Ret	7	(Germany) Michael Bartels	Nissan Primera Gte	18	Disqualified	17	
Ret	5	(Czech Republic) Vaclav Bervid	BMW 318iS	13	Engine	40	
Ret	22	(United Kingdom) Anthony Reid	Vauxhall Cavalier Gsi	12	Accident	8	
Ret	4	(Switzerland) Bernard Thuner	Peugeot 405 Mi16	9	Engine	35	
Ret	41	(United Kingdom) Tim Harvey	Renault Laguna	3	Head Gasket	5	
Ret	18	(France) Philippe Gache	Ford Mondeo Ghia	2	Accident Damage	24	
Ret	20	(United Kingdom) John Cleland	Vauxhall Cavalier Gsi	0	Accident	4	
Ret	26	(Italy) Emanuele Pirro	Audi 80 Quattro	0	Accident	6	
Ret	27	(Italy) Stefano Modena	Alfa Romeo 155 Ts	0	Accident	9	
Ret	3	(Switzerland) Alain Menu	Renault Laguna	0	Accident (1st start)	7	
Ret	35	(South Africa) Shaun van der Linde	BMW 318iS	0	Accident (1st start)	22	
Ret	45	(United Kingdom) Kieth O'Dor	Nissan Primera Gte	0	Accident (1st start)	25	
Ret	30	(Netherlands) Jan Lammers	Volvo 850 Glt	0	Accident (1st start)	27	
Ret	43	(United Kingdom) David Leslie	Renault Laguna	0	Accident (1st start)	28	
Ret	6	(Czech Republic) Milos Bychl	BMW 318iS	0	Accident (1st start)	38	

- Fastest Lap: Paul Radisich 1.39.60

=== Nations' standings ===
Pos	Nation	Points
1	Germany	53
2	(United Kingdom) Great Britain	44
3	Italy	31
4	Spain	12

=== Manufacturers' Trophy ===
Pos	Nation	Points
1	(Germany) BMW	54
2	(United States) Ford	48
3	(Italy) Alfa Romeo	20
4	(Germany) Audi	16
5	(Japan) Toyota	16
6	(France) Peugeot	6
7	(Japan) Nissan	2
8	(Germany) Opel / Vauxhall	1
9	(Japan) Mazda	0
9	(France) Renault	0
9	(Sweden) Volvo	0
