= Roger Dowson Engineering =

Automotive racing engineering company

(United Kingdom) Roger Dowson Engineering
- Founded: 1982
- Team principal(s): Roger Dowson
- Former series: BSCC; ESSO Metro Challenge; BTCC; Mazda MX-5 UK Cup; TCWC; NTCC
- Noted drivers: Former: Patrick Watts; Tony Pond; Martin Brundle; Robin Brundle; Steve Soper; Jerry Mahony; Matt Neal; David Leslie; Slim Borgudd
- Drivers' Championships: 1994 NTCC (Borgudd)

Roger Dowson Engineering, also known as RD Motorsport, is an automotive engineering company, and an auto racing team run by Roger Dowson. The company was founded in 1982, and was most notable for running the works MG Metros in the British Saloon Car Championship in 1983 (and running them until 1985, after Austin Rover had withdrawn their support) and the works Mazda teams in the British Touring Car Championship from 1992 until 1994.

== History ==
Roger Dowson Engineering was established in 1982 by Roger Dowson, initially to build Group A specification MG Metros (in naturally aspirated and turbocharged form.) The turbocharged Metros had a claimed maximum power output of 190 hp (142 kW; 193 PS). They ran the cars in the British Saloon Car Championship in 1983 under the "Unipart with Daily Express" banner, initially entering Patrick Watts in a naturally-aspirated MG Metro in round two, before entering Tony Pond in a Metro Turbo from round four onwards. Watts switched to the Metro Turbo from round eight onwards, whilst Martin Brundle was entered in the final round in a Metro Turbo. Watts took two fourth places in Class C whilst driving the naturally-aspirated Metro, whilst Tony Pond took a Class B victory in the Metro Turbo. For 1984, the team entered two Metro Turbos for the first six rounds of the series, driven by Robin Brundle and Watts under the "Computervision Racing with Esso" banner, although Austin Rover had withdrawn their works support. Watts took three Class B victories in the first four races, with Brundle taking the other. The team only competed in the season opener of the 1985 BSCC season, with Steve Soper driving a Metro Turbo. He failed to finish, due to a carburettor issue.

In 1987, Roger Dowson Engineering ran the ESSO Metro Challenge, a one-make series for MG Metro Turbos. They also made the kits used to prepare the cars for racing. 1987 also saw Roger Dowson Engineering enter the new British Touring Car Championship, running Jerry Mahony in a Class A Ford Sierra RS Cosworth in round six and round seven. The venture was not initially successful, as Mahony retired in both races. The team remained in the series for 1988, now under the "Arquati Racing Team" banner, with Mahony entering all 12 events in a Ford Sierra RS500. Mahony won the season opener at Silverstone, his first, and only, overall BTCC victory. Mahony also took four third-place finishes, and finished second in Class A (seventh overall) at the end of the season. The team entered Mahony under the "Arquati Racing Team" banner again for 1989, but with less success; Mahony took one solitary podium, and finished 15th in class (41st overall). Mahony left the team for 1990, and joined BRR Motorsports, leaving Roger Dowson Engineering without a driver (or main sponsor - Mahony took the Arquati sponsorship with him.) For 1990, Roger Dowson Engineering built the cars used in that year's Mazda MX-5 UK Cup, a series won by Patrick Watts.

In 1992, Roger Dowson Engineering ran the works Mazda cars in the British Touring Car Championship, under the "Shell Mazda Racing Team" name. Watts was entered in a Mazda 323F, but the season would not prove to be particularly successful; Watts finished 18th overall in the driver's standings, and Mazda finished sixth, and last, in the manufacturer's standings. For 1993, the team replaced the 323F with a Xedos 6, under the "Mazda Racing Team" banner. It would be a much more successful partnership; Watts finished in 15th place, with 24 points more than he'd gained the previous season, although Mazda still finished last in the manufacturer's standings. Watts also qualified on pole for the first, and only, time in his BTCC career, in the Snetterton round of the championship. For the 1994 BTCC season, Dowson collaborated with Team Dynamics to run the works Mazdas, and expanded to a two-car effort; with David Leslie and Matt Neal driving under the "Team Mazda" banner. 1994 would prove to be less successful than 1993 had been; Neal was forced to withdraw from the series, after suffering injuries from a big crash in the sixth round at Silverstone, whilst Leslie withdrew halfway through the season due to budgetary problems. Leslie's best finishes were a pair of eighth positions at the first two rounds, whilst Neal's was a tenth at Snetterton. Neal finished 23rd in the championship, level with privateers James Thompson and Nigel Smith, whilst Leslie finished 20th. Mazda were classified tenth, and last, in the manufacturer's championship.

Following the withdrawal from the BTCC, Team Dynamics and Roger Dowson Engineering fitted the running gear from the Xedos 6 into a Mazda 323F, with the intention of encouraging Mazda to return to the BTCC. Matt Neal was entered in the car for that year's FIA Touring Car World Cup, but without any real success - Neal finished 22nd, and a lap down on the leader. Slim Borgudd, who had won the Nordic Touring Car Championship in a Xedos 6 entered by Roger Dowson Engineering that season, fared little better - finishing 21st. For 1995, Roger Dowson Engineering built another 323F, and intended to enter Borgrudd in the BTCC with the car, under the "Team Magic" banner. However, the car never raced in the BTCC, and sat in storage until 2000, when Nick Cresswell bought the car, and entered it in that year's Northwest Sports and Saloon Car Championship.

In 2002, Roger Dowson Engineering prepared the first ever hybrid rally car, based on a Toyota Prius, for Nik Berg and Tim Bampton. The car was entered in that year's Midnight Sun to Red Sea Rally, an event that ran from Östersund in Sweden to Aqaba in Jordan. The car finished in 15th, and became the first hybrid to finish an FIA-sanctioned event.
