= Colin Blair =

British racing driver (born 1957)

- Nationality: (United Kingdom) British
- Born: 17 September 1957 (age 69) Glasgow, Scotland

British Touring Car Championship
- Years active: 2000–2001
- Teams: Pro Motorsport; GA-Janspeed Racing
- Starts: 37
- Wins: 0
- Poles: 0
- Fastest laps: 0
- Best finish: 11th in 2000

Colin Blair (born 17 September 1957 in Glasgow) is a British former racing driver best known for his short time driving in the British Touring Car Championship. After working for a recruitment company, he didn't start in motor sport until the age of thirty-nine.

== Racing career ==
Blair spent two years in 1997 and 1998, racing in the Scottish Road saloon car champion with a class A Ford Sierra RS500. In 1999, he drove a class A Ford Escort in the Ford Saloon Car Challenge, where he finished the season in second place. He stepped up to the BTCC in 2000, with an independent Nissan Primera GT. Early in the season he won the Michelin Cup for Independents at Brands Hatch and scored points towards the Independents' standings. At the series' Knockhill round in May, he arrived tied at the top of the Michelin Cup points table with reigning independent champion Matt Neal.

Blair later crashed out of the Oulton Park feature race in his Nissan Primera. Crash.net later reported that Blair withdrew after a testing crash at Croft and was replaced in the PRO Motorsport Primera by David Leslie.

Blair finished 11th in the 2000 BTCC standings with 26 points, and placed second in the Michelin Cup for Independents behind Neal.

In 2001, Blair drove in the production class BTCC with GA Janspeed Racing in an Alfa Romeo 156 with teammate Gavin Pyper, finishing in eighteenth place.

== Racing record ==
=== Complete British Touring Car Championship results ===
(key) (Races in bold indicate pole position - 1 point awarded all races, 2001 in class) (Races in italics indicate fastest lap - 1 point awarded all races in 2001 only, 2001 in class) (* signifies that driver lead feature race for at least one lap - 1 point awarded, 2001 in class)

Year	Team	Car	Class	1	2	3	4	5	6	7	8	9	10	11	12	13	14	15	16	17	18	19	20	21	22	23	24	25	26	Pos	Pts	Class
2000	PRO Motorsport	Nissan Primera GT '00	S	BRH; 1 ovr:11 cls:11	BRH; 2 ovr:8 cls:8	DON; 1 ovr:9 cls:9	DON; 2 ovr:10 cls:10	THR; 1 ovr:10 cls:10	THR; 2 ovr:6 cls:6	KNO; 1 ovr:10 cls:10	KNO; 2 ovr:7 cls:7	OUL; 1 ovr:8 cls:8	OUL; 2 Ret	SIL; 1 ovr:9 cls:9	SIL; 2 ovr:10 cls:7	CRO; 1	CRO; 2	SNE; 1	SNE; 2	DON; 1	DON; 2	BRH; 1	BRH; 2	OUL; 1	OUL; 2	SIL; 1	SIL; 2			11th	26	
2001	GA-Janspeed Racing	Alfa Romeo 156	P	BRH; 1 Ret†	BRH; 2 DNS	THR; 1 Ret	THR; 2 Ret	OUL; 1 ovr:22 cls:14	OUL; 2 ovr:13 cls:9	SIL; 1 ovr:17 cls:10	SIL; 2 Ret	MON; 1 Ret	MON; 2 ovr:9 cls:5	DON; 1 Ret	DON; 2 Ret	KNO; 1 Ret	KNO; 2 Ret	SNE; 1 ovr:16 cls:12	SNE; 2 Ret	CRO; 1 ovr:17 cls:11	CRO; 2 Ret	OUL; 1 ovr:19 cls:11	OUL; 2 Ret	SIL; 1 ovr:18 cls:9	SIL; 2 Ret	DON; 1 ovr:17 cls:9	DON; 2 ovr:10 cls:4	BRH; 1 Ret	BRH; 2 Ret	N/A	22	18th

† Event with 2 races staged for the different classes.
