= BTCC Masters =

Layout of the Donington Park racing circuit

The BTCC Masters was a one off touring car race organised between motorsport organiser TOCA director Alan J. Gow and car manufacturer SEAT. The race took place at the Donington Park National Circuit in Leicestershire, England on 26 September 2004 at the conclusion of the final race of the 2004 British Touring Car Championship. All drivers used identical SEAT Leon Cupra R's. Anthony Reid was the winner of the race, ahead of Alain Menu in second place and Gabriele Tarquini in third position.

== Background ==
Alan J. Gow, the British Touring Car Championship (BTCC) chief executive, thought of the idea of a race to determine the "BTCC Master" from 16 past and present drivers from the BTCC. The total number of drivers was 16, the line up including eight former champions was the largest number of BTCC champions to take place in one race. The rest of the grid was made up of race winners and former stars from the past 12 years. Only two drivers were unable to race, Yvan Muller and James Thompson due to their contracts with Vauxhall. Car numbers related to the year they won the BTCC championship, for example John Cleland in car number 95 because he won in 1995. With non championship winning drivers given single numbers. The drivers would all take two timed free practice sessions in the cars but the starting grid would be drawn randomly from a hat. The winning driver would donate the proceeds to their favourite charity.

The cars were all identical SEAT Leon Cupra R's, as driven in the SEAT Cupra Championship which was part of the TOCA tour. As the cars were front wheel drive, older drivers such as Gravett and Sytner said they did struggle to drive as they were used to driving rear wheel drive touring cars. All cars were painted in the same grey colour except for SEAT driver Jason Plato, who drove a blue car.

== Practice ==
Two practice sessions were held on 25 September, the day before the race. Jason Plato set the pace in the first practice session, which took place on a wet track, with a lap time of 1:24.932 he set late on. Kelvin Burt, Alain Menu, Anthony Reid and Matt Neal followed in the top five placings. Mechanical trouble caused Patrick Watts to miss most of the session. The second practice session was led by Menu with a time of 1:17.362, ahead of Johnny Cecotto, Paul Radisich, Burt and Gabriele Tarquini (who ended his session early when he got stuck in the gravel trap) in positions two to five.

== Qualifying ==
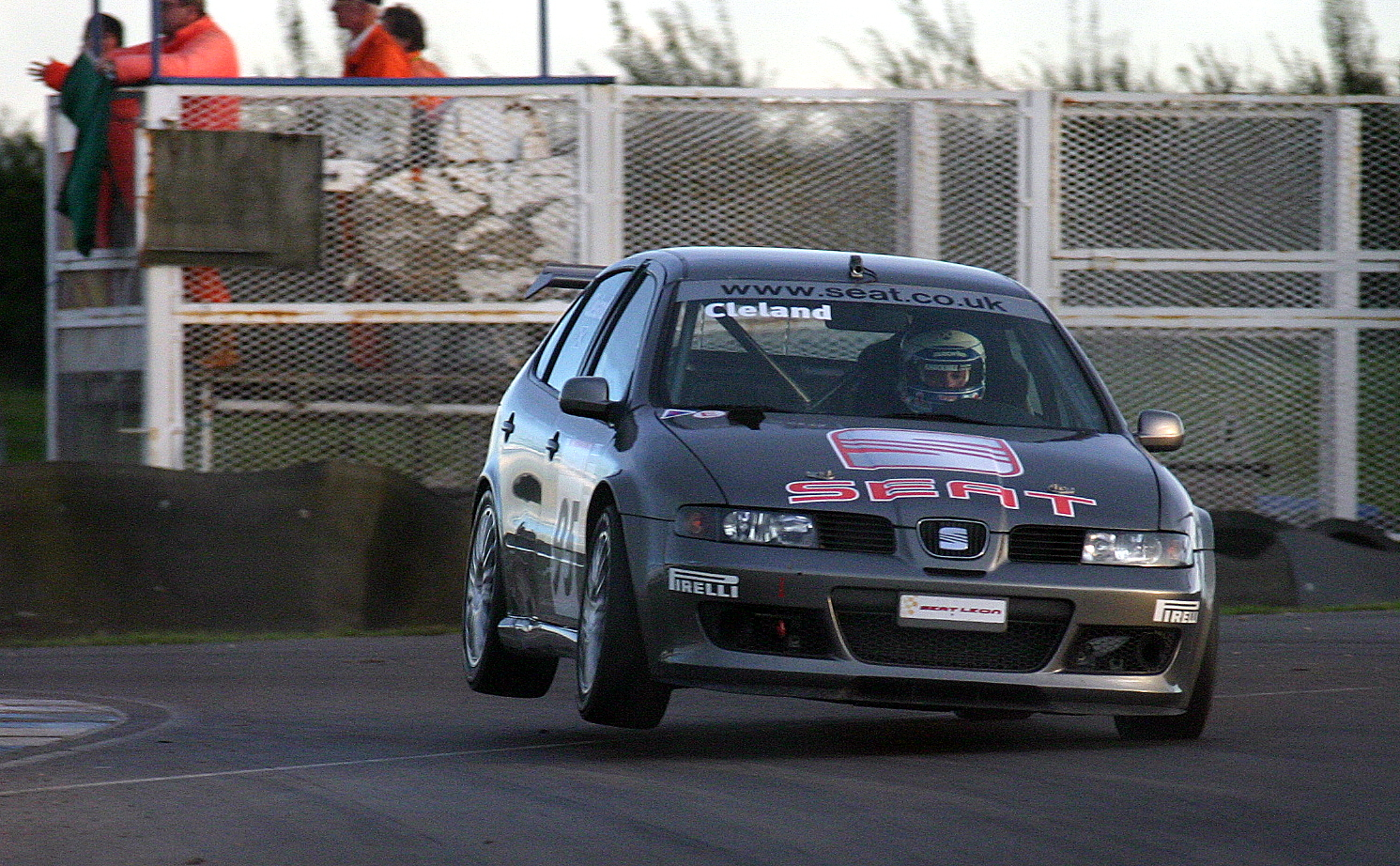
Pole-sitter John Cleland

For qualifying, the 16 entered drivers were assigned their starting positions through a lot conducted by Gow on 26 September. John Cleland was drawn pole position, with Reid, Julian Bailey, Watts and Plato in second to fifth. Neal was given sixth place, Burt seventh, Cecotto eighth, Menu ninth and Tim Harvey tenth. The next five starting positions were assigned to Frank Biela, Jeff Allam, Robb Gravett, Frank Sytner and Radisich. Tarquini was the final starter in 16th position.

=== Starting grid ===
Pos	No.	Driver	Lap time
1	95	(United Kingdom) John Cleland	1:18.295
2	6	(United Kingdom) Anthony Reid	1:18.135
3	5	(United Kingdom) Julian Bailey	1:19.184
4	8	(United Kingdom) Patrick Watts	1:18.907
5	01	(United Kingdom) Jason Plato	1:18.194
6	3	(United Kingdom) Matt Neal	1:18.445
7	7	(United Kingdom) Kelvin Burt	1:17.631
8	2	(Venezuela) Johnny Cecotto	1.17.349
9	97	(Switzerland) Alain Menu	1:17.362
10	92	(United Kingdom) Tim Harvey	1:18.044
11	96	(Germany) Frank Biela	1:18.368
12	4	(United Kingdom) Jeff Allam	1:18.944
13	90	(United Kingdom) Robb Gravett	1:19.428
14	88	(United Kingdom) Frank Sytner	1:19.688
15	9	(New Zealand) Paul Radisich	1:17.598
16	94	(Italy) Gabriele Tarquini	1:18.006

== Race ==
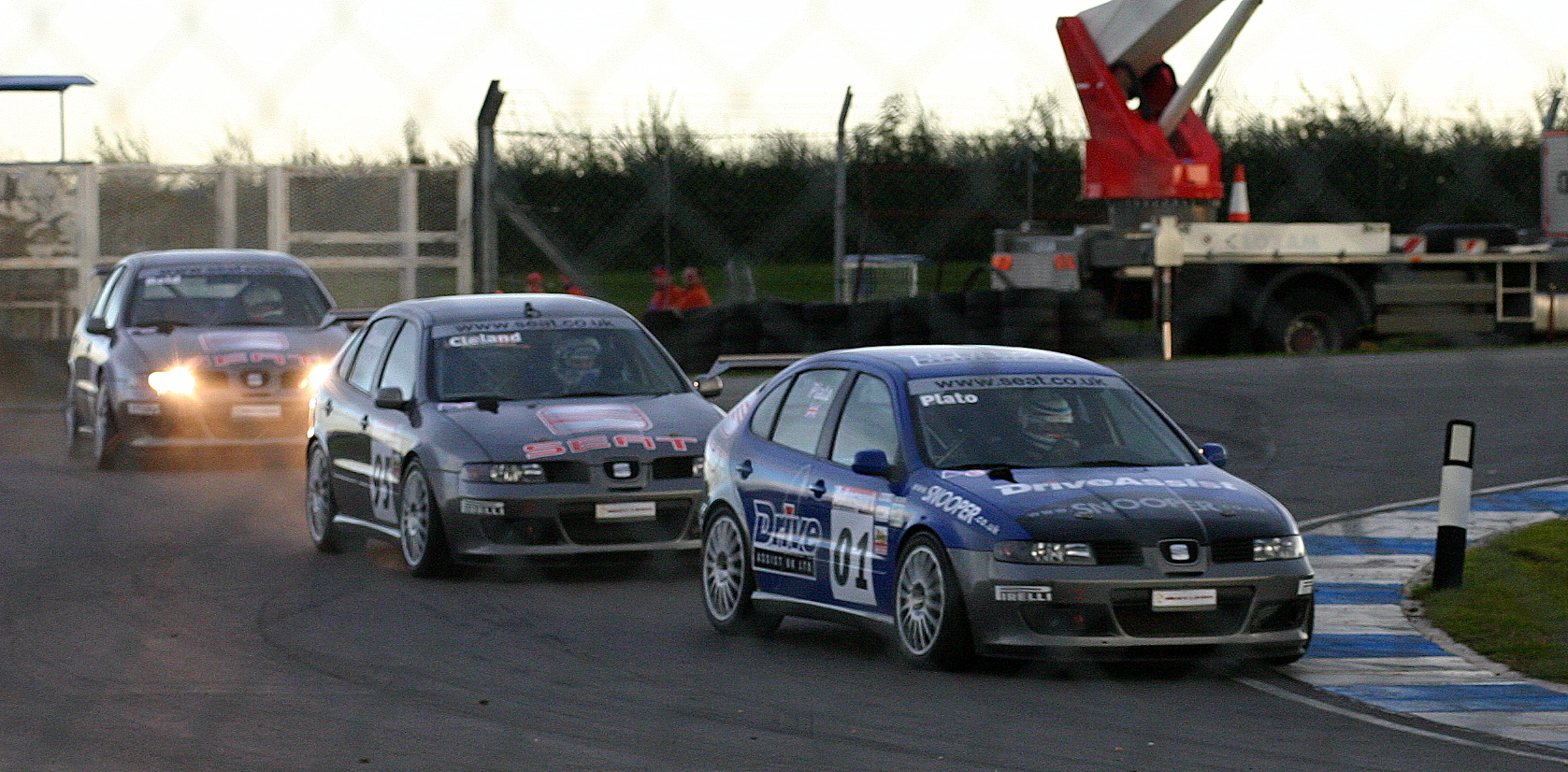
Jason Plato leading John Cleland and Anthony Reid

More than 20,000 spectators attended the event, which took place in cloudy and slightly dark weather conditions and commenced at 17:40 local time. As all the drivers took their places on the grid and waited for the starting lights, second-place starter Reid, jumped the start as the lights were on red. Reid went forward a few feet and as he realised his error and stopped, the lights had gone green and he'd lost several places. On the whole, the race was fiercely contested by all competitors with much panel bashing throughout. This was evident as early as the second corner as Jason Plato pushed past Watts for second place sending him onto the grass and dropping him down the field. Making the most progress on the first lap was Harvey. Starting in tenth, he had managed to make his way up to third by the time the cars had started lap two. At the front the battle was between Cleland and Plato.

Plato took the lead on lap four but Cleland stayed close and got his place back again two laps later. On lap eight Plato forced his way up the inside of Cleland on the first corner. This sent Cleland wide and both Reid and Harvey also got by. While all this was happening at the front, Tarquini had set the fastest lap time and had already overtaken half the field. The safety car was soon brought out for a lap purely to bunch up all the drivers again who by now were quite spread apart. Following the restart there was a new race leader as Reid forcefully got past Plato. Further behind as the cars came round the Craner Curves, Kelvin Burt was pushed by the group of drivers behind him off the track and hard side on into the tyre wall. It was a heavy collision but thankfully, Burt exited the car shaken but unhurt. As the cars were slowed down for the safety car, somehow Harvey and Cecotto managed to collide, sending both drivers into the gravel trap and out of the race.

When the race had restarted again, Alain Menu made a move past Plato as they went round the old hairpin. Menu knocked Plato on to the grass. He tried to keep the car in a straight line to get back on to the tarmac coming under Starkys bridge, but as he returned to the track he drove straight in front of Watts. Watts had no chance to avoid and both wrecked cars spun off the circuit. By now Reid was clear in first place with Menu second. On the final lap the main battle was for third. Frank Biela had the position but the impressive Tarquini was now right behind him and managed to get side by side as they came under the Dunlop Bridge towards the final corner. At the finish, Reid took the race victory with Menu half a second behind. Tarquini had overtaken Biela to take the final podium place. Just behind them Neal took fifth and Cleland finished sixth in what was a thrilling race.

=== Race classification ===
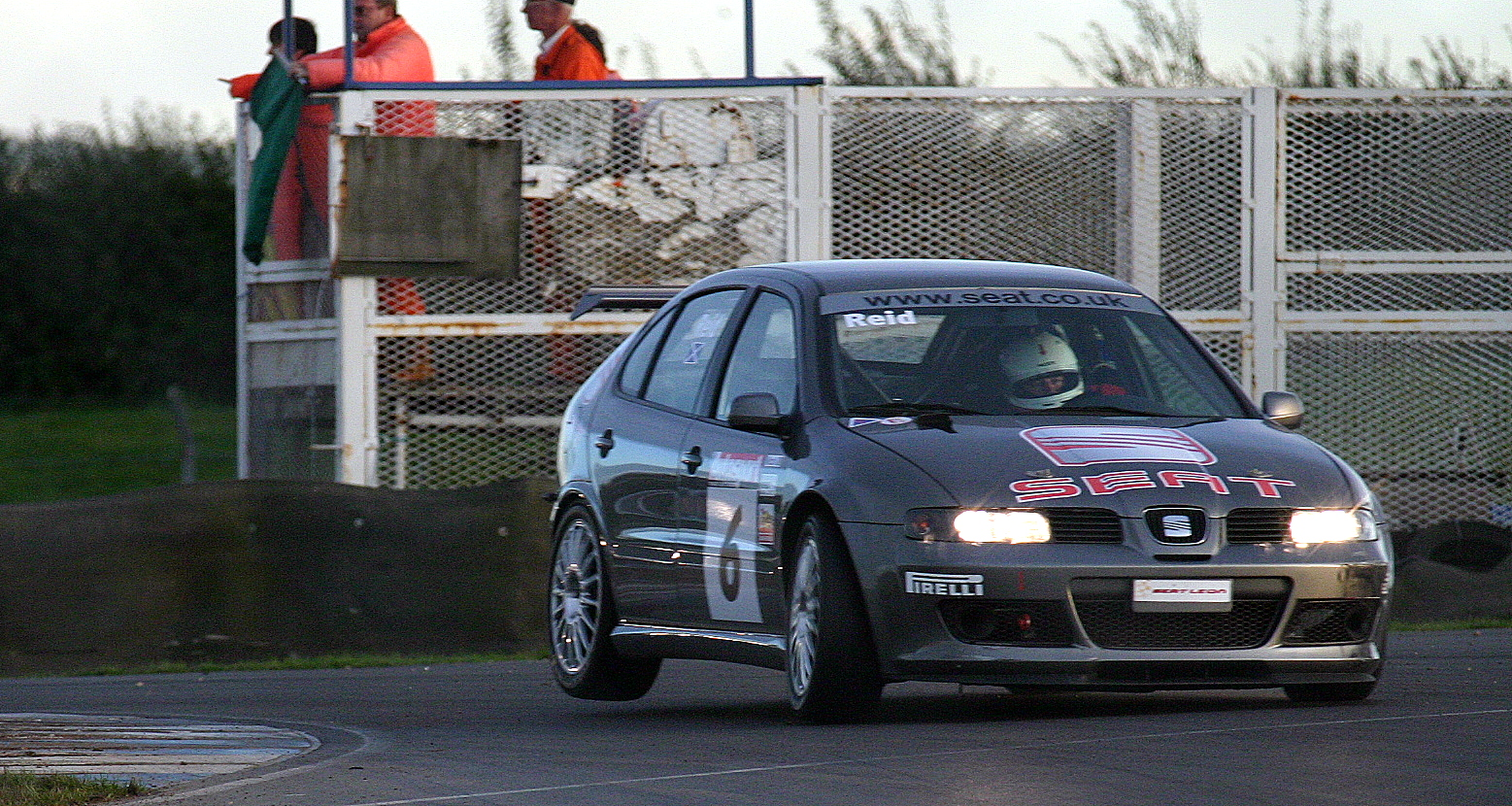
Race winner Anthony Reid

Pos	No.	Driver	Laps	Time/Retired	Grid
1	6	(United Kingdom) Anthony Reid	20	29:30.38	2
2	97	(Switzerland) Alain Menu	20	+0.537	9
3	94	(Italy) Gabriele Tarquini	20	+1.942	16
4	96	(Germany) Frank Biela	20	+2.239	11
5	3	(United Kingdom) Matt Neal	20	+4.493	6
6	95	(United Kingdom) John Cleland	20	+5.409	1
7	9	(New Zealand) Paul Radisich	20	+6.717	15
8	4	(United Kingdom) Jeff Allam	20	+7.106	12
9	5	(United Kingdom) Julian Bailey	20	+7.950	3
10	90	(United Kingdom) Robb Gravett	20	+8.224	13
11	88	(United Kingdom) Frank Sytner	20	+12.076	14
Ret	01	(United Kingdom) Jason Plato	17	Accident	5
Ret	8	(United Kingdom) Patrick Watts	17	Accident	4
Ret	2	(Venezuela) Johnny Cecotto	13	Accident	8
Ret	92	(United Kingdom) Tim Harvey	13	Accident	10
Ret	7	(United Kingdom) Kelvin Burt	12	Accident	7
