= Jerry Mahony =

British racing driver (born 1955)

- Nationality: (United Kingdom) British
- Born: Jeremy John Mahony; 15 May 1955 (age 71) Warminster, Wiltshire, England

British Touring Car Championship
- Years active: 1987–1990
- Teams: Roger Dowson Engineering; Arquati Racing Team
- Starts: 34
- Wins: 1
- Poles: 0
- Fastest laps: 1
- Best finish: 7th in 1988

Jeremy John Mahony (pronounced Marny) (born 15 May 1955) is a British former racing driver, best known for driving a Ford Sierra RS500 in the British Touring Car Championship under the Arquati Racing banner. He first competed in the BTCC in 1988 and won his very first race at Silverstone having done two rounds in 1987 in a converted prodsaloon Ford Sierra RS Cosworth and also the Silverstone TT round of the WTCC in a Belgian entered Holden Commodore buying the drive with his Arquati sponsorship. That however would prove to be his only win, but he challenged consistently in his first season, finishing second in class to Andy Rouse. The following season was marred by bad luck and unreliability and included an appearance at Oulton Park in the #89 Celebrity Car in the MG Metro Turbo Challenge. A switch to a BMW M3 in 1990 did little to reverse his fortunes and he quit the sport halfway through the season. He turned his attention to his business interests, including corporate entertainments. He was arrested in 2005 alongside Vic Lee, and was jailed for 11 years on drug trafficking charges.

== Racing record ==
=== Complete British Touring Car Championship results ===
(key) (Races in bold indicate pole position in class) (Races in italics indicate fastest lap in class - 1 point awarded 1987-1989 all races)

Year	Team	Car	Class	1	2	3	4	5	6	7	8	9	10	11	12	13	DC	Pts	Class
1987	Roger Dowson Engineering	Ford Sierra RS Cosworth	A	SIL	OUL	THR	THR	SIL	SIL; Ret	BRH; Ret	SNE	DON	OUL	DON	SIL		NC	0	NC
1988	Arquati Racing Team	Ford Sierra RS500	A	SIL ovr:1 cls:1	OUL ovr:3 cls:3	THR ovr:3 cls:3	DON; Ret	THR ovr:3 cls:3	SIL ovr:8 cls:8	SIL ovr:4 cls:4	BRH ovr:5 cls:5	SNE ovr:8 cls:8	BRH ovr:3 cls:3	BIR; C	DON ovr:9 cls:9	SIL ovr:5 cls:5	7th	33	**2nd**
1989	Arquati Racing Team	Ford Sierra RS500	A	OUL ovr:3 cls:3	SIL ovr:27 cls:15	THR ovr:6 cls:6	DON; Ret	THR; Ret	SIL ovr:9 cls:9	SIL ovr:11 cls:11	BRH ovr:8 cls:8	SNE ovr:9 cls:9	BRH ovr:8 cls:7	BIR ovr:10 cls:10	DON; Ret	SIL; Ret	41st	5	15th
1990	Arquati Racing Team	BMW M3	B	OUL; Ret	DON ovr:11 cls:6	THR; Ret	SIL ovr:12 cls:6	OUL; Ret	SIL ovr:18 cls:11	BRH	SNE ovr:12 cls:7	BRH	BIR; DNA	DON	THR	SIL	23rd	16	15th

=== Complete World Touring Car Championship results ===
(key) (Races in bold indicate pole position) (Races in italics indicate fastest lap)

Year	Team	Car	1	2	3	4	5	6	7	8	9	10	11	DC	Pts
1987	(Belgium) Alex Guyaux	Holden Commodore VL	MNZ	JAR	DIJ	NÜR	SPA	BNO	SIL ovr:14 cls:6†	BAT	CLD	WEL	FJI	NC	0

† Not eligible for points.

=== Complete European Touring Car Championship results ===
(key) (Races in bold indicate pole position) (Races in italics indicate fastest lap)

Year	Team	Car	1	2	3	4	5	6	7	8	9	10	11	DC	Pts
1988	(United Kingdom) **Arquati UK Ltd**	Ford Sierra RS500	MNZ	DON	EST	JAR	DIJ	VAL	NÜR	SPA	ZOL	SIL; 12	NOG	NC	0

=== Complete 24 Hours of Le Mans results ===
Year	Team	Co-Drivers	Car	Class	Laps	Pos.	Class Pos.
1990	(United Kingdom) ADA Engineering	(United Kingdom) Ian Harrower (United Kingdom) John Sheldon	ADA 02B-Ford Cosworth	C2	164	DNF	DNF
