= 2000 British Touring Car Championship =

43rd season of the British Touring Car Championship

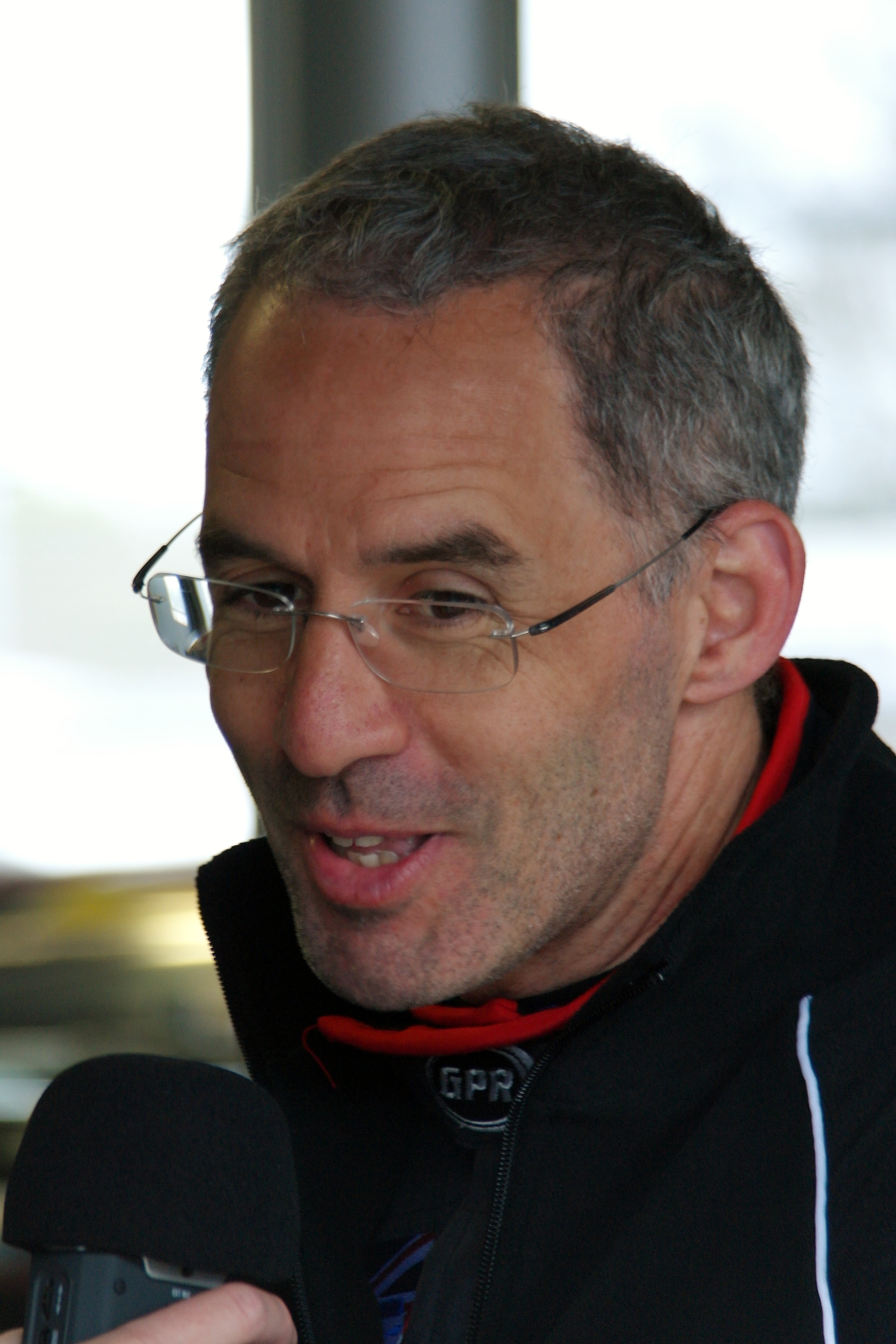
Alain Menu, the 2000 British Touring Car Champion.

The 2000 Auto Trader RAC British Touring Car Championship season featured 24 rounds across 12 meetings, it commenced at Brands Hatch on 9 April and concluded at Silverstone on 16 September.

2000 marked the final year for Super Touring specification cars in the championship. The champion was Alain Menu driving a Ford Mondeo, his teammates Anthony Reid and Rickard Rydell finished 2nd and 3rd respectively. The Michelin Cup for Independents was won by Matt Neal driving a Nissan Primera.

The newly introduced Class B, for Super Production specification cars, was won by Alan Morrison driving a Peugeot 306 GTi.

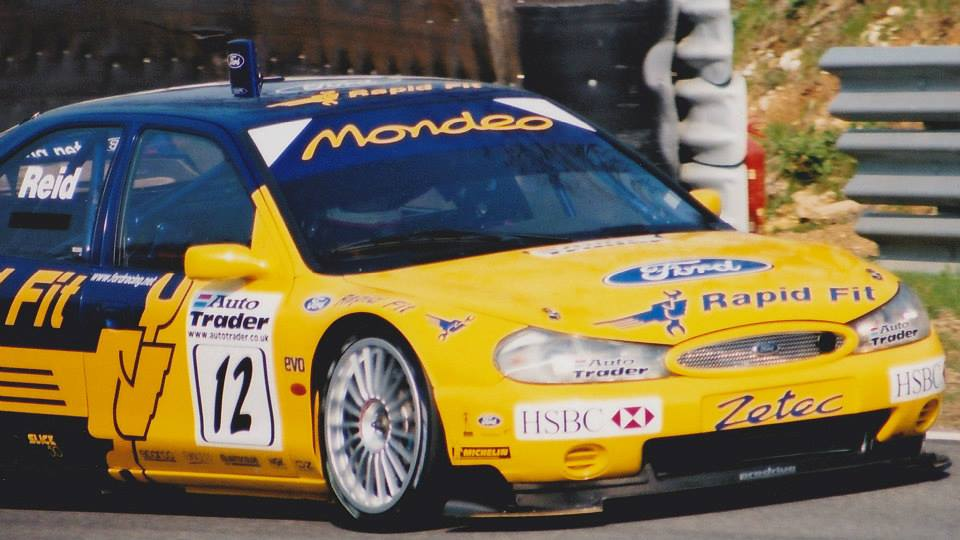
Anthony Reid finished 2nd driving a Ford Mondeo

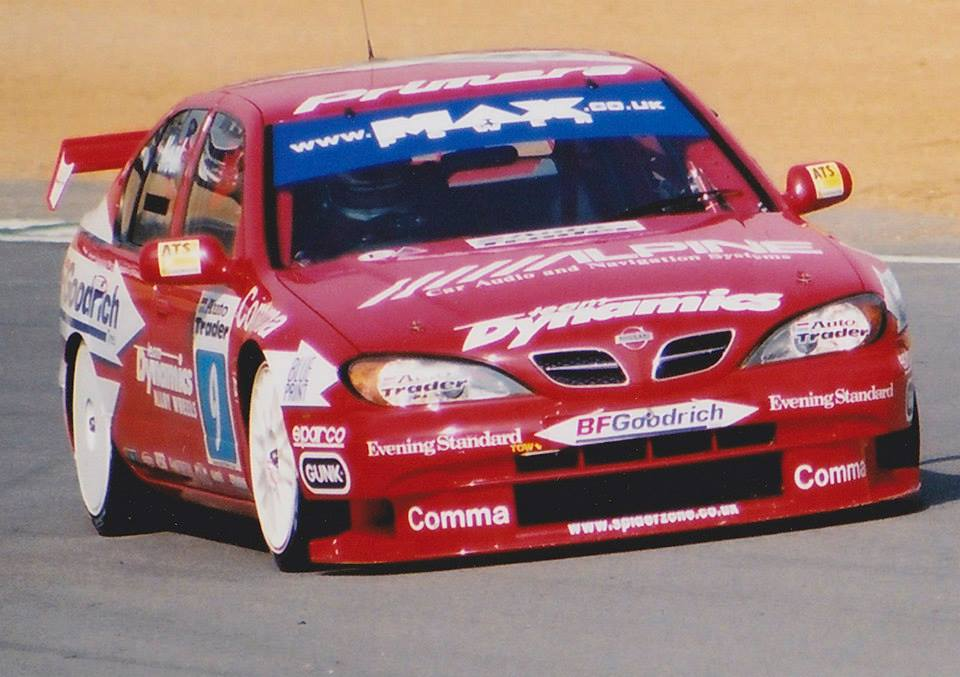
Matt Neal won the Independents Cup driving a Nissan Primera

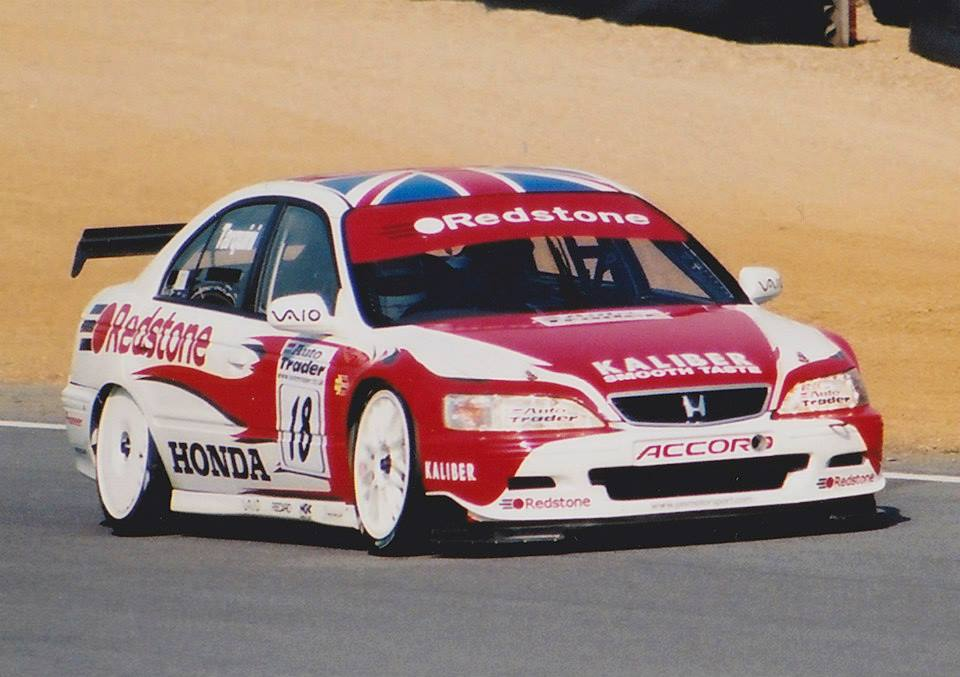
Gabriele Tarquini finished 6th overall driving a Honda Accord

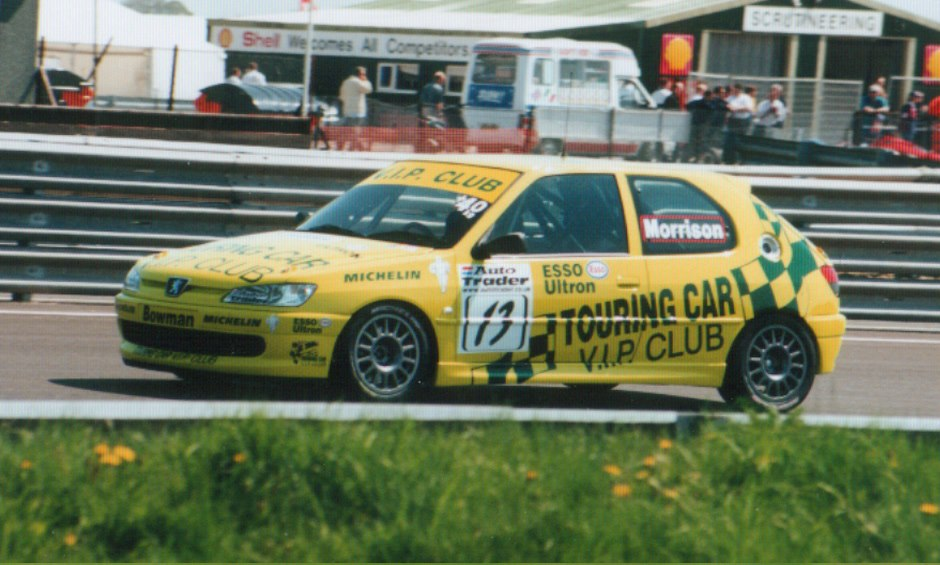
Alan Morrison won the Class B championship driving a Peugeot 306

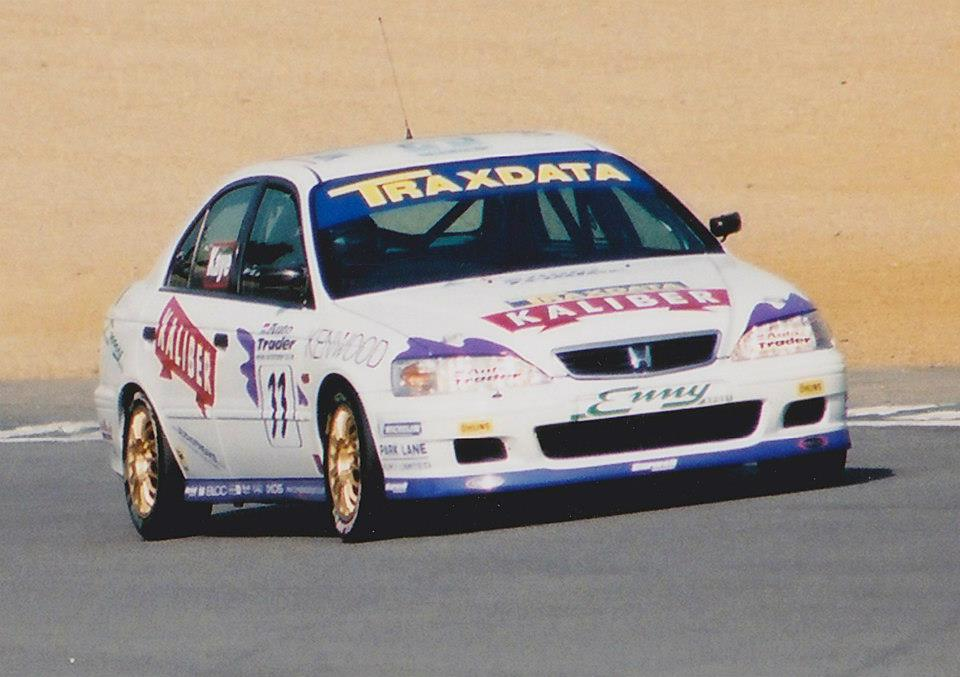
James Kaye finished 2nd in Class B driving a Honda Accord

== Background ==
=== Driver changes ===
==== Supertouring ====
There were several changes of driver for the 2000 season. Nissan, Renault and Volvo retired their works teams because of the rising costs of staying competitive in the BTCC, thus leaving only three manufacturers with factory supported entries: Ford, Honda and Vauxhall. 1999 Drivers' Champion Laurent Aïello did not return to defend his title; the Frenchman tested for Honda, however he instead joined Audi to compete in the 24 Hours of Le Mans endurance race and the newly revived Deutsche Tourenwagen Masters championship in Germany. His place was taken by 1997 24 Hours of Le Mans co-winner and former Super Tourenwagen Cup driver Tom Kristensen. In the meantime, Peter Kox switched to competing in the European Super Touring Car Championship. Initially Honda planned to run two cars but to level the playing field with Ford and Vauxhall decided to draft in 1994 champion Gabriele Tarquini in a JAS Motorsport prepared car that originally would have been driven alongside Kox in the European championship.

1998 series champion Rickard Rydell joined that year's runner-up Anthony Reid and 1997 overall winner Alain Menu at the Prodrive Ford team following Volvo's departure. At the Vauxhall team, Yvan Muller was partnered by Jason Plato and Vincent Radermecker, having joined from Renault and Volvo respectively. After a difficult 1999 season, former double champion (1989 and 1995) John Cleland announced his retirement from the BTCC. Independent driver Matt Neal drove a 1999 Nissan Primera fielded by Team Dynamics, who had semi-works support from the manufacturer and running with updated 2000 body work. A second Nissan was entered by PRO Motorsport for rookie Colin Blair. David Leslie would race the car at selected rounds later in the season following Blair's withdrawal halfway through the season. Lee Brookes appeared on the entry list but his plans of competing in the championship in 2000 did not come to fruition.

A Volkswagen Bora entry and an LPG-powered Vauxhall Vectra with Mark Ticehurst driving were mooted but never materialised.

==== Class B ====
To boost grid numbers, cars from the National Saloon Championship were allowed to race as Class B.

The lead contender was Alan Morrison in a Vic Lee Racing Peugeot 306. A second 306 would appear occasionally in the hands of 1991 Champion Will Hoy, Lee Linford, Toni Ruokonen and future Independents Champion Dan Eaves.

Barwell Motorsport ran former double Independents Champion James Kaye in a Honda Accord and Mark Lemmer, who had previously competed as an Independent in 1998, in a Honda Integra. Kaye would switch to a 2nd Integra for Knockhill only and Lemmer switched to a 2nd Accord for the final meeting at Silverstone. Two more Integras for Nick James and David Pitcher graced the entry list, but only James would actually race (competing from the first Silverstone meeting onwards), with Pitcher failing to start either of the first two races of the season at Brands Hatch then pulling out completely and selling the car.

Gary Ayles ran two Alfa Romeo 156s for Tom Ferrier and Gavin Pyper in the last three meetings.

Former Audi works driver John Bintcliffe ran two Nissan Primeras for Marc Nordon and future Independents Champion Rob Collard. RJN Motorsport would also enter a Primera at the last two meetings, Andy Middlehurst drove the car at Oulton Park, returning after a 7-year absence, and former Nissan test driver Bryce Wilson drove at Silverstone.

GR Motorsport entered the penultimate meeting at Oulton Park with a pair of Ford Focuses for former Peugeot works driver Simon Harrison and future Team Dynamics regular Gareth Howell.

Geoff Kimber-Smith returned for the final meeting at Silverstone, after a 10-year absence, in a Toyota Carina-E.

Proton were due to debut in the BTCC with Richard Cuene-Grandidier (a.k.a. "Kermit") appearing on the initial entry list with a Proton Compact, but the car never appeared.

=== Season summary ===
The Prodrive Ford Mondeo's would prove to be the class of the season, and it would be their three drivers who would battle for the championship. Alain Menu had been the favourite going into the year, but despite being arguably the best all-rounder out of the trio, a handful of non-finishes meant he entered the final race of the year behind Anthony Reid in points.

Reid's season was based mostly on consistency, taking until round seventeen to win a race and only winning two all season, but he still led the championship going into the final race of the year. The Scot was doing all that he needed in the finale and looked to be on course for the title, until a collision with Vincent Radermecker on the penultimate lap put him out of the race and handed the crown to Menu.

Team newcomer Rickard Rydell also went to Silverstone with a chance of the title. The Swede claimed a season-best nine pole positions throughout the year, but a number of retirements, both crashes and mechanical, would ultimately prove to be his downfall. Indeed, it would be a car problem which would deny him a chance of competing with his teammates in the final race, as a water leak left him unable to take the start.

Vauxhall's season started well, both Yvan Muller and Jason Plato won races early on and the Frenchman even lead the points for a time. But the team could not sustain that form, and along with an intra-team rivalry building between Muller and Plato, they were forced to settle for best of the rest behind the Fords. Third driver Radermecker had a poor season, scoring only one podium and being the only full-time main class driver to not win a race during the year.

Honda's season would be one of frustration. James Thompson went into the season planning a title challenge, but those hopes were dashed by a crash at the opening round at Brands Hatch which forced him to miss the next two meetings. He would win a race on his return, but any hopes of the championship were gone, and come the end of the season he found himself combining his British campaign with DTM drives for Audi.

The returning Gabriele Tarquini would ultimately end the season as top Honda, picking up three race wins but only finishing sixth in the standings. British championship rookie Tom Kristensen would also pick up three race wins, including a double at the Silverstone finale (the final races of the Super Touring era), to end the year just behind Tarquini.

Independent king Matt Neal would once again compete with the works teams. He would finish eighth in the standings with a race win late in the season at Brands Hatch. He won the independents class in every race he finished (21 out of 24 races).

== Regulation and sporting changes ==
Michelin, now the series' control tyre supplier, developed new compounds of tyres for the drivers but an intermediate option would no longer be available. The only choice for drivers was slick dry tyres or full wet compounds which meant tyre choices in greasy or changeable conditions were more crucial than before. To make matters even more difficult, tyre warmers were no longer allowed in advance of the race. As a result, the drivers had to take to the track on ill-handling cold tyres at the beginning of all races and after the mandatory pit stops. All teams were restricted to 28 sets of dry tyres for all race meetings and test sessions to lower operating costs but no limitations existed for wet-weather compounds.

Success ballast to help the championship have close and competitive racing and to prevent any team from dominating the series was introduced for the 2000 season. The top three finishers of the sprint and feature race at a meeting were allocated a ballast to be applied at the next meeting. It was distributed as 40 kg (88 lb) for a winner, 30 kg (66 lb) for second place and 20 kg (44 lb) for third place, with the ballast capped at 40 kg (88 lb). No team was permitted to change the engine of their cars between the second qualifying session and the sprint race or the driver would incur a grid penalty that would see him start at the back of the grid. Also, replacement cars were not allowed except in force majeure when he would be allowed to drive his teammate's entry.

The points scoring system for the Drivers' and Teams' Championships remained unaltered from the 1999 championship. However, the Manufacturers' Championship was now limited to each team nominating a maximum of three cars for points, up from two from the previous season, to reward committed manufacturers. Furthermore, a dropped point score system was put into operation for the 2000 season. This meant all drivers would be required to drop their four worst results from the season before tallying his overall points haul.

From 1 March 2000, a complete ban of private testing at any licensed motor racing circuit in the world was enforced, except for official test sessions organised by the series promoter TOCA that lasted for half a day and were held before each race weekend. The ban was enacted to greatly reduce operating costs for all teams and to restrict the amount of available time for drivers to set up their cars for each track to ensure a greater variation in performance and less predictable racing. Furthermore, test cars were barred from all official sessions unless they had been driven in the preceding race meeting.

=== Class B ===
The 2000 season saw the introduction of a type of car regulation called "Class B" to bolster the number of entrants on the grid. The class was open to all vehicles that complied with the FIA Super Production regulations and the National Saloon Championship. To allow for suitable grid sizes, Class B entries were accepted on a "first-come, first served" basis from teams who could commit to competing in the BTCC full-time. Class B was created as a consequence of a request to series promoters TOCA from potential competitors in the National Saloon Championship in December 1999 as a means of promoting themselves in a more visible national motor racing series. TOCA subsequently formed a partnership with the British Racing Drivers' Club-organised PowerTour series in January 2000, so that the two championships could work closely with race dates, regulations and marketing and promoting of Class B.

=== Other ===
The entry fee for the Independents' Championship was abolished; teams would receive a starting money fee of £5,000 for each race meeting they entered, tyres would be given to teams at no extra cost and the champion of the category would receive £10,000 in prize money.

== Team and drivers ==
Team	Car	No.	Drivers	Rounds
Manufacturers
Redstone Team Honda with JAS Motorsport	Honda Accord	2	(United Kingdom) David Leslie	3
Redstone Team Honda with JAS Motorsport	Honda Accord	4	(United Kingdom) James Thompson	1, 4–12
Redstone Team Honda with JAS Motorsport	Honda Accord	7	(Netherlands) Peter Kox	2
Redstone Team Honda with JAS Motorsport	Honda Accord	18	(Italy) Gabriele Tarquini	All
Redstone Team Honda with JAS Motorsport	Honda Accord	77	(Denmark) Tom Kristensen	All
Ford Team Mondeo	Ford Mondeo	3	(Sweden) Rickard Rydell	All
Ford Team Mondeo	Ford Mondeo	11	(Switzerland) Alain Menu	All
Ford Team Mondeo	Ford Mondeo	12	(United Kingdom) Anthony Reid	All
Vauxhall Motorsport	Vauxhall Vectra	5	(United Kingdom) Jason Plato	All
Vauxhall Motorsport	Vauxhall Vectra	6	(France) Yvan Muller	All
Vauxhall Motorsport	Vauxhall Vectra	8	(Belgium) Vincent Radermecker	All
Independents
PRO Motorsport	Nissan Primera GT '00	2	(United Kingdom) David Leslie	9, 12
PRO Motorsport	Nissan Primera GT '00	45	(United Kingdom) Colin Blair	1–7
Team Dynamics Max Power Racing	Nissan Primera GT '00	9	(United Kingdom) Matt Neal	1–11
Team Dynamics Max Power Racing	Nissan Primera GT '98	9	(United Kingdom) Matt Neal	12
Brookes Motorsport	Honda Accord	99	(United Kingdom) Lee Brookes	None
Class B
Touring Car V.I.P. Club	Peugeot 306 GTi	13	(United Kingdom) Alan Morrison	All
Touring Car V.I.P. Club	Peugeot 306 GTi	14	(United Kingdom) Will Hoy	6
Touring Car V.I.P. Club	Peugeot 306 GTi	24	(United Kingdom) Lee Linford	9
Touring Car V.I.P. Club	Peugeot 306 GTi	25	(Finland) Toni Ruokonen	10
Touring Car V.I.P. Club	Peugeot 306 GTi	26	(United Kingdom) Dan Eaves	11–12
Gary Ayles Motorsport	Alfa Romeo 156	16	(United Kingdom) Tom Ferrier	10–12
Gary Ayles Motorsport	Alfa Romeo 156	44	(United Kingdom) Gavin Pyper	10–11
Bintcliffe Sport	Nissan Primera	20	(United Kingdom) Marc Nordon	1–3, 5–12
Bintcliffe Sport	Nissan Primera	21	(United Kingdom) Rob Collard	2–3, 5–12
Barwell Motorsport	Honda Integra Type-R	23	(United Kingdom) Mark Lemmer	1-11
Barwell Motorsport	Honda Integra Type-R	33	(United Kingdom) James Kaye	4
Barwell Motorsport	Honda Accord	23	(United Kingdom) Mark Lemmer	12
Barwell Motorsport	Honda Accord	33	(United Kingdom) James Kaye	1-3, 5-12
Kermit Racing	Proton Compact	43	(France) Richard Cuene-Grandidier	None
Arnold James Sport	Honda Integra Type-R	48	(United Kingdom) Nick James	6–12
RJN Motorsport	Nissan Primera	50	(United Kingdom) Andy Middlehurst	11
RJN Motorsport	Nissan Primera	51	(United Kingdom) Bryce Wilson	12
David Pitcher	Honda Integra Type-R	69	(United Kingdom) David Pitcher	1
GR Motorsport	Ford Focus	71	(United Kingdom) Simon Harrison	11
GR Motorsport	Ford Focus	81	(United Kingdom) Gareth Howell	11
Geoff Kimber-Smith	Toyota Carina E	74	(United Kingdom) Geoff Kimber-Smith	12
Sources:

- Lee Brookes and Richard Cuene-Grandidier appeared on the official entry list but did not race.

== Race calendar and results ==
All races were held in the United Kingdom. A provisional 28-round calendar for the BTCC was officially announced on 28 July 1999. For the first time since the 1996 season, the series raced on the Brands Hatch Grand Prix layout and it served as the championship's season-opening meeting in April. Two meetings were held at night: the sole Snetterton Circuit round in July and the season-closing meeting at the Silverstone Circuit in mid-September. TOCA director Alan J. Gow explained that the advance publication of the calendar was so that the remaining British motorsport series could plain theirs but was told to reduce the number of rounds because of budgetary constraints for some teams.

In response, the management of the Thruxton Circuit agreed to forego its second planned meeting in August and lower the number of rounds to 26. Later, the Donington Park National circuit meeting, which had been proposed to be the season's second meeting on 23 April, was moved to late March to avoid a clash with the 2000 British Grand Prix but this decision was later reversed. The series' planned inaugural meeting in Ireland at Mondello Park was cancelled because the track needed improving to bring it to Fédération Internationale de l'Automobile (FIA) and TOCA standards, bringing the final number of rounds to 24.

Round		Circuit	Date	Pole position	Fastest lap	Winning driver	Winning team	Winning Class B
1	R1	Brands Hatch (Grand Prix), Kent	9 April	(Switzerland) Alain Menu	(United Kingdom) Jason Plato	(Switzerland) Alain Menu	Ford Team Mondeo	(United Kingdom) Alan Morrison
1	R2	Brands Hatch (Grand Prix), Kent	9 April	(Switzerland) Alain Menu	(United Kingdom) Anthony Reid	(United Kingdom) Jason Plato	Vauxhall Motorsport	(United Kingdom) James Kaye
2	R3	Donington Park (National), Leicestershire	24 April	(Sweden) Rickard Rydell	(Switzerland) Alain Menu	(Switzerland) Alain Menu	Ford Team Mondeo	(United Kingdom) Alan Morrison
2	R4	Donington Park (National), Leicestershire	24 April	(Sweden) Rickard Rydell	(Sweden) Rickard Rydell	(Switzerland) Alain Menu	Ford Team Mondeo	(United Kingdom) James Kaye
3	R5	Thruxton Circuit, Hampshire	1 May	(France) Yvan Muller	(United Kingdom) Jason Plato	(France) Yvan Muller	Vauxhall Motorsport	(United Kingdom) Alan Morrison
3	R6	Thruxton Circuit, Hampshire	1 May	(United Kingdom) Jason Plato	(United Kingdom) Jason Plato	(France) Yvan Muller	Vauxhall Motorsport	(United Kingdom) Alan Morrison
4	R7	Knockhill Circuit, Fife	14 May	(Switzerland) Alain Menu	(United Kingdom) James Thompson	(Sweden) Rickard Rydell	Ford Team Mondeo	(United Kingdom) Mark Lemmer
4	R8	Knockhill Circuit, Fife	14 May	(Italy) Gabriele Tarquini	(Denmark) Tom Kristensen	(Italy) Gabriele Tarquini	Redstone Team Honda	(United Kingdom) Alan Morrison
5	R9	Oulton Park (Island), Cheshire	29 May	(Switzerland) Alain Menu	(United Kingdom) Jason Plato	(Switzerland) Alain Menu	Ford Team Mondeo	(United Kingdom) James Kaye
5	R10	Oulton Park (Island), Cheshire	29 May	(Denmark) Tom Kristensen	(Denmark) Tom Kristensen	(Denmark) Tom Kristensen	Redstone Team Honda	(United Kingdom) James Kaye
6	R11	Silverstone Circuit (International), Northamptonshire	11 June	(Sweden) Rickard Rydell	(France) Yvan Muller	(United Kingdom) James Thompson	Redstone Team Honda	(United Kingdom) Alan Morrison
6	R12	Silverstone Circuit (International), Northamptonshire	11 June	(Sweden) Rickard Rydell	(France) Yvan Muller	(France) Yvan Muller	Vauxhall Motorsport	(United Kingdom) Alan Morrison
7	R13	Croft Circuit, North Yorkshire	25 June	(Sweden) Rickard Rydell	(Sweden) Rickard Rydell	(Sweden) Rickard Rydell	Ford Team Mondeo	(United Kingdom) Alan Morrison
7	R14	Croft Circuit, North Yorkshire	25 June	(Sweden) Rickard Rydell	(Sweden) Rickard Rydell	(Sweden) Rickard Rydell	Ford Team Mondeo	(United Kingdom) James Kaye
8	R15	Snetterton Circuit, Norfolk	8 July	(United Kingdom) Jason Plato	(United Kingdom) Jason Plato	(United Kingdom) Jason Plato	Vauxhall Motorsport	(United Kingdom) Alan Morrison
8	R16	Snetterton Circuit, Norfolk	8 July	(Sweden) Rickard Rydell	(United Kingdom) Jason Plato	(Switzerland) Alain Menu	Ford Team Mondeo	(United Kingdom) Rob Collard
9	R17	Donington Park (Grand Prix), Leicestershire	30 July	(Italy) Gabriele Tarquini	(United Kingdom) Anthony Reid	(United Kingdom) Anthony Reid	Ford Team Mondeo	(United Kingdom) Alan Morrison
9	R18	Donington Park (Grand Prix), Leicestershire	30 July	(Italy) Gabriele Tarquini	(United Kingdom) Anthony Reid	(Italy) Gabriele Tarquini	Redstone Team Honda	(United Kingdom) James Kaye
10	R19	Brands Hatch (Indy), Kent	28 August	(Sweden) Rickard Rydell	(United Kingdom) Matt Neal	(United Kingdom) Matt Neal	Team Dynamics Racing	(United Kingdom) Alan Morrison
10	R20	Brands Hatch (Indy), Kent	28 August	(Denmark) Tom Kristensen	(Denmark) Tom Kristensen	(Switzerland) Alain Menu	Ford Team Mondeo	(United Kingdom) James Kaye
11	R21	Oulton Park (Island), Cheshire	10 September	(United Kingdom) Anthony Reid	(Italy) Gabriele Tarquini	(United Kingdom) Anthony Reid	Ford Team Mondeo	(United Kingdom) Alan Morrison
11	R22	Oulton Park (Island), Cheshire	10 September	(Italy) Gabriele Tarquini	(Italy) Gabriele Tarquini	(Italy) Gabriele Tarquini	Redstone Team Honda	(United Kingdom) James Kaye
12	R23	Silverstone Circuit (International), Northamptonshire	16 September	(Sweden) Rickard Rydell	(Denmark) Tom Kristensen	(Denmark) Tom Kristensen	Redstone Team Honda	(United Kingdom) Alan Morrison
12	R24	Silverstone Circuit (International), Northamptonshire	16 September	(Denmark) Tom Kristensen	(Denmark) Tom Kristensen	(Denmark) Tom Kristensen	Redstone Team Honda	(United Kingdom) Dan Eaves

== Championship standings ==
Points system
**1st**	**2nd**	**3rd**	**4th**	**5th**	**6th**	**7th**	**8th**	**9th**	**10th**	Pole Position	Fastest Lap	Lead a lap in feature race
15	12	10	8	6	5	4	3	2	1	1	1	1

- No driver may collect more than one "Lead a Lap" point per race no matter how many laps they lead.
- Drivers' top 20 results count towards the championship.

=== Drivers Championship ===
Pos.	Driver	BRH		DON		THR		KNO		OUL		SIL		CRO		SNE		DON		BRH		OUL		SIL		Pts
Touring Class
1	(Switzerland) Alain Menu	**1**	**7***	1	1*	8	3	**2**	Ret	**1**	6	Ret	3	5	2	Ret	1*	8	9	4	1*	5	6	Ret	3*	195
2	(United Kingdom) Anthony Reid	5	2*	3	4	2	4	3	3	5	3	2	Ret	2	DSQ	4	6	1	3*	(8)	4	**1**	2*	(7)	Ret(*)	193(201)
3	(Sweden) Rickard Rydell	3	4*	**2**	**3***	4	Ret	1	2	Ret	Ret	**8**	**DSQ**	**1**	**1***	3	**5**	Ret	6	**3**	2	Ret	8	**2**	DNS	178
4	(France) Yvan Muller	2	3	Ret	5	**1**	1*	7	4	Ret	5	7	1*	8	5	Ret	4	4	4	5	6	3	3	(8)	5	168(171)
5	(United Kingdom) Jason Plato	4	1*	6	7	3	**2***	8	8	7	2	Ret	5	Ret	Ret‡	**1**	2	5	7	7	3*	9	4	Ret	2	160
6	(Italy) Gabriele Tarquini	9	6*	4	2*	Ret	5	Ret	**1***	9	8	5	2	6	Ret‡	6	7	**6**	**1***	9	10	2	**1***	Ret	6	149
7	(Denmark) Tom Kristensen	7	Ret	5	6	9	Ret	5	Ret	3	**1***	3	6*	4	9	2	Ret	10	Ret	2	**8**	8	Ret	1	**1***	143
8	(United Kingdom) Matt Neal	(10)	Ret	8	8	7	Ret	4	5	6	9	4	Ret	3	3	5	8*	2	2	1	9	7	7*	5	7	129(130)
9	(United Kingdom) James Thompson	6	Ret					6	DSQ	4	4	1	4	7	4	Ret	3*	3	5*	6	5*	4	5	3	8*	129
10	(Belgium) Vincent Radermecker	8	5	7	Ret	5	Ret*	9	6	2	7	6	Ret	9	Ret‡	Ret	DNS	9	8	10	7	6	Ret	4	4	81
11	(United Kingdom) Colin Blair	11	8	9	10	10	6	10	7	8	Ret	9	10													26
12	(United Kingdom) David Leslie					6	Ret											7	10					6	Ret	15
13	(Netherlands) Peter Kox			Ret	9																					2
Class B
1	(United Kingdom) Alan Morrison	**12**	**(Ret)**	**10**	**13**	**11**	**7**	(NC)	**9**	Ret	Ret	10	7	**10**	**7**	7	**13**	11	12	11	15	10	13	9	Ret	264(266)
2	(United Kingdom) James Kaye	13	9	11	11	(13)	Ret	12	11	**10**	**10**	11	8	NC	6	8	10	**12**	**11**	Ret	**11**	12	9	**10**	10	260(265)
3	(United Kingdom) Mark Lemmer	(14)	10	(12)	12	12	DSQ	**11**	10	11	12	12	9	12	10	**9**	11	13	13	14	13	(15)	12	12	Ret	185(200)
4	(United Kingdom) Rob Collard			Ret	Ret	DNS	DNS			12	11	13	Ret	11	8	Ret	9	14	Ret	Ret	12	Ret	DNS	Ret	Ret	81
5	(United Kingdom) Dan Eaves																					**11**	**10**	11	**9**	53
6	(United Kingdom) Nick James											14	11	14	11	11	12	16	Ret	Ret	DNS	Ret	Ret	13	Ret	51
7	(United Kingdom) Marc Nordon	Ret	DNS	Ret	DNS	DNS	DNS			13	Ret	DNS	DNS	13	Ret‡	10	Ret	Ret	Ret	15	Ret	Ret	Ret	Ret	12	30
8	(United Kingdom) Tom Ferrier																			13	14	Ret	Ret	Ret	DNS	18
9	(United Kingdom) Gareth Howell																					13	11			18
10	(Finland) Toni Ruokonen																			**12**	Ret					14
11	(United Kingdom) Geoff Kimber-Smith																							14	13	11
12	(United Kingdom) Bryce Wilson																							Ret	11	10
13	(United Kingdom) Andy Middlehurst																					14	Ret			6
14	(United Kingdom) Lee Linford																	15	Ret							6
15	(United Kingdom) Will Hoy											**Ret**	**Ret**													2
16	(United Kingdom) Gavin Pyper																			Ret	DNS	Ret	DNS			1
–	(United Kingdom) Simon Harrison																					Ret	Ret			0
–	(United Kingdom) David Pitcher	DNS	DNS																							0
Pos.	Driver	BRH		DON		THR		KNO		OUL		SIL		CRO		SNE		DON		BRH		OUL		SIL		Pts

Note: bold signifies pole position in class (1 point awarded all races), italics signifies fastest lap in class (1 point awarded all races) and * signifies that driver lead feature race for at least one lap (1 point given).

‡ Retired before second start of race

=== Independent's Championship ===
Pos.	Driver	BRH		DON		THR		KNO		OUL		SIL		CRO		SNE		DON		BRH		OUL		SIL		Pts
1	(United Kingdom) Matt Neal	**10**	**Ret**	8	**8**	**7**	**Ret**	**4**	**5**	6	**9**	**4**	Ret	**3**	**3**	**5**	**8**	**2**	**2**	**1**	**9**	**7**	**7**	**5**	**7**	**339 (360)**
2	(United Kingdom) Colin Blair	11	8	**9**	10	10	6	10	7	**8**	Ret	9	**10**													**144**
3	(United Kingdom) David Leslie																	7	10					6	Ret	**36**
Pos.	Driver	BRH		DON		THR		KNO		OUL		SIL		CRO		SNE		DON		BRH		OUL		SIL		Pts

=== Manufacturers Championship ===
Pos	Manufacturer	BRH		DON		THR		KNO		OUL		SIL		CRO		SNE		DON		BRH		OUL		SIL		Pts
1	Ford / Ford Team Mondeo	1	2	1	1	2	3	1	2	1	3	2	3	1	1	3	1	1	3	3	1	1	2	2	3	515
1	Ford / Ford Team Mondeo	3	4	2	3	4	4	2	3	5	6	8	Ret	2	2	4	5	8	6	4	2	5	6	7	Ret	515
2	Honda / Redstone Team Honda	6	6	4	2	6	5	5	1	3	1	1	2	4	4	2	3	3	1	2	5	2	1	1	1	411
2	Honda / Redstone Team Honda	7	Ret	5	6	9	Ret	6	Ret	4	4	3	4	6	9	6	7	6	5	6	8	4	5	3	6	411
3	Vauxhall / Vauxhall Motorsport	2	1	6	5	1	1	7	4	2	2	6	1	8	5	1	2	4	4	5	3	3	3	4	2	399
3	Vauxhall / Vauxhall Motorsport	4	3	7	7	3	2	8	6	7	5	7	5	9	Ret‡	Ret	4	5	7	7	6	6	4	8	4	399
Pos	Manufacturer	BRH		DON		THR		KNO		OUL		SIL		CRO		SNE		DON		BRH		OUL		SIL		Pts

=== Touring Teams Championship ===
Pos	Team	BRH	DON	THR	KNO	OUL	SIL	CRO	SNE	DON	BRH	OUL	SIL	Pts
1	Ford Team Mondeo	2	1	3	2	3	3	1	1	3	1	2	3	205
1	Ford Team Mondeo	4	3	4	3	6	Ret	2	5	6	2	6	Ret	205
2	Vauxhall Motorsport	1	5	1	4	2	1	5	2	4	3	3	2	196
2	Vauxhall Motorsport	3	7	2	6	5	5	Ret‡	4	7	6	4	4	196
3	Redstone Team Honda	6	2	5	1	1	2	4	3	1	5	1	1	176
3	Redstone Team Honda	Ret	6	Ret	Ret	4	4	9	7	5	8	5	6	176
4	Team Dynamics Max Power Racing	Ret	8	Ret	5	9	Ret	3	8	2	9	7	7	47
5	PRO Motorsport	8	10	6	7	Ret	10			10			Ret	19
Pos	Team	BRH	DON	THR	KNO	OUL	SIL	CRO	SNE	DON	BRH	OUL	SIL	Pts

‡ Retired before second start of race
