= Anthony Reid =

British racing driver (born 1957)

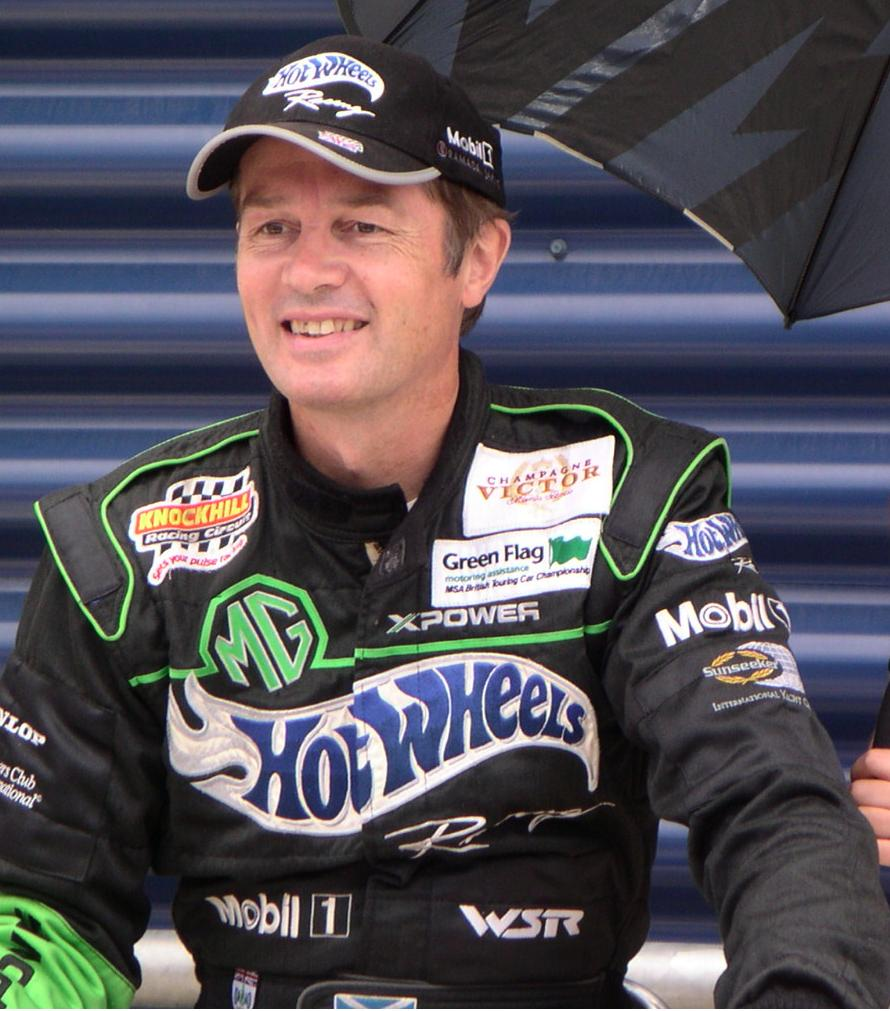
- Reid as a BTCC driver in 2003
- Nationality: (United Kingdom) British
- Born: 17 May 1957 (age 69) Glasgow, Scotland

British Touring Car Championship
- Years active: 1997–2004, 2009
- Teams: Team RAC; MG; Ford; Nissan
- Starts: 179
- Wins: 15
- Poles: 18
- Fastest laps: 28
- Best finish: 2nd in 1998 & 2000

Previous series
- 2012-13 2005, 08 2004–09 1996 1995 1994–96 1993 1991–93 1990 1989 1986–88: Britcar; British GT Championship; TC2000; German Supertouring; Spanish Touring Cars; JTCC; Japanese F3000; Japanese F3; World Sports-Prototype Championship; Formula Opel Lotus Euroseries; British F3

Championship titles
- 2004 1992: BTCC Masters; Japanese F3

Robert Anthony Maxwell Reid (born 17 May 1957) is a British racing driver, originally from Glasgow, Scotland. He was educated at Loretto School in Edinburgh. He lives in England.

== Formula cars ==
Reid spent many years in Formula Three and other junior single-seater championships, winning the Japanese Formula Three Championship in 1992 and winning Japanese GT championship races, but his success has mostly been with a roof over his head, firstly in sportscars and later in Touring car racing.

Reid received an offer to join the Jordan F1 Team in 1991, but was unable to raise the required £2.5 million sponsorship money after his sponsor, a Japanese property company, went under due to an economic downturn in Japan. The Jordan F1 team instead signed Bertrand Gachot, who in turn after being sentenced to six months in prison was replaced with Michael Schumacher. He still keeps the letter of acceptance in a frame on his wall in his toilet.

== Le Mans ==
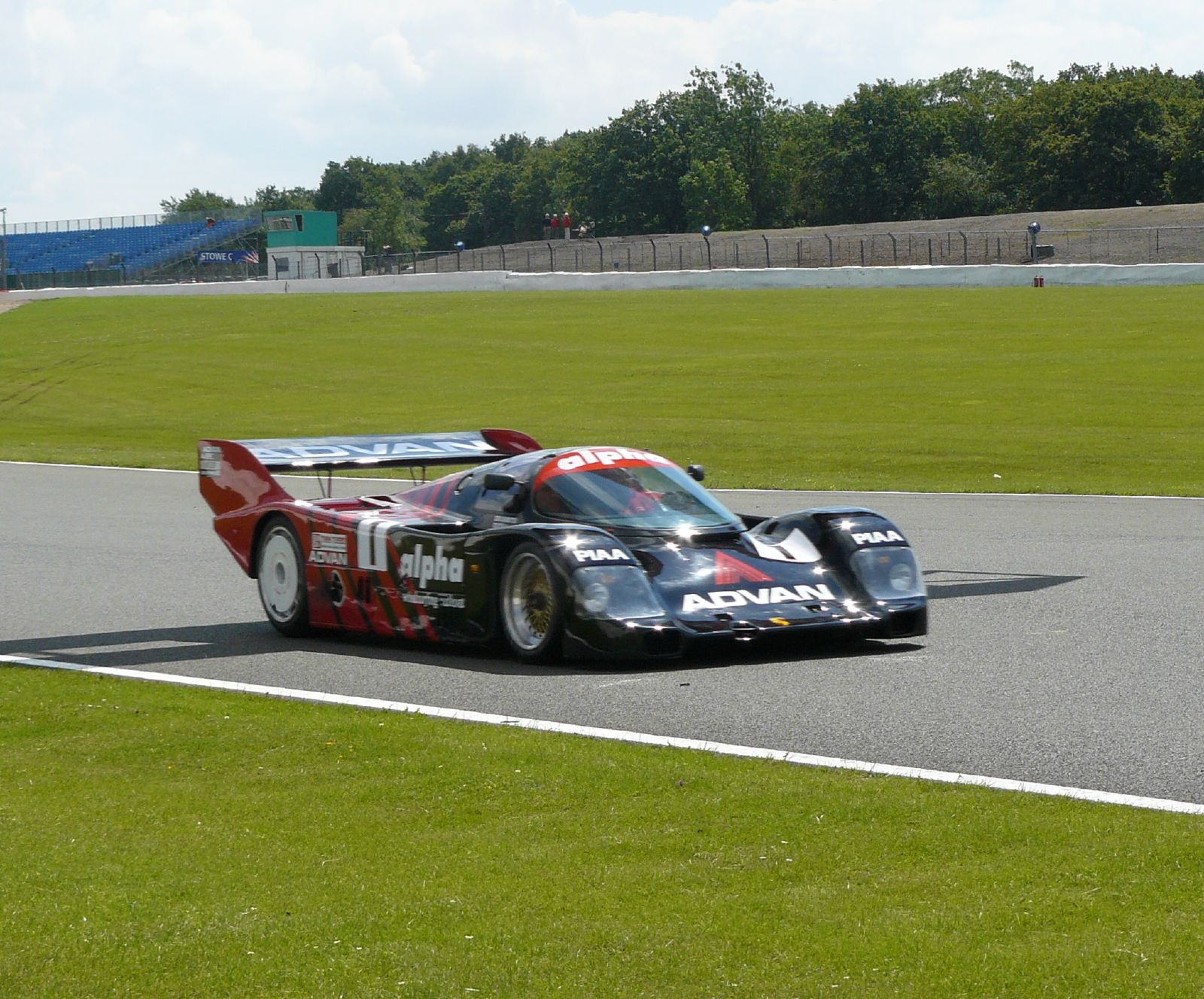
Alpha Racing, Porsche 962C

In the 1990 24 Hours of Le Mans, Reid competed for Porsche, driving the Alpha Racing 962C in Group C1. He came third overall and won in the nonworks car. Again in 1991, he drove the 962C but with Konrad motorsport.

Later in his career, Reid drove the Lister Storm at the 1996 24 Hours of Le Mans (he also drove for the team at the 1997 Daytona 24 Hours and the Spa round of the 1998 British GT Championship). Racing in the MG Lola in 2001 and 2002, the team achieved pole position in their class however the car was retired due to gearbox problems. In 2005, Reid drove the Scuderia Ecosse Ferrari. In qualifying, he completed three laps with a best time of 4:13.237 which became the team's best time. The car eventually retired at the hands of Reid's team mate due to a delaminated tyre, leaving the car stranded on the circuit.

== Touring Cars ==
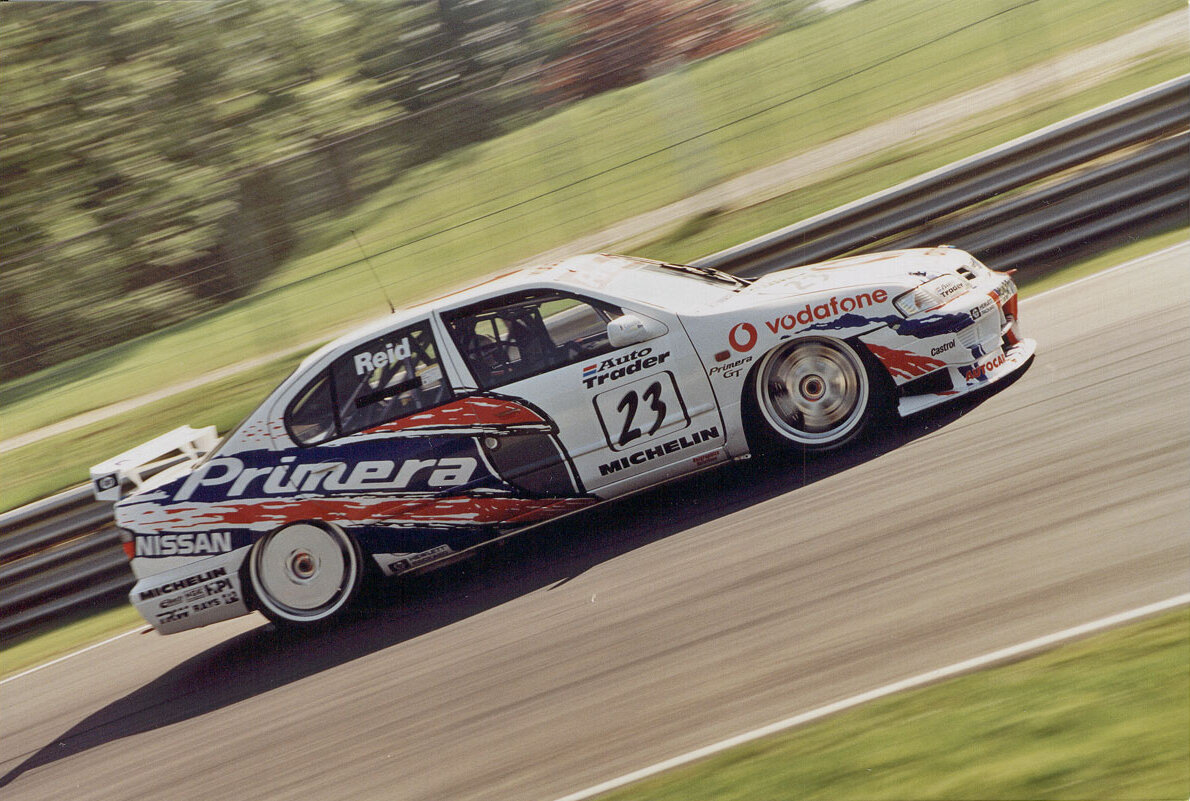
Reid driving for Nissan in the 1998 British Touring Car Championship

Reid enjoyed a successful stint in Japanese touring cars between 1992 and 1996, driving an ex BTCC Vauxhall Cavalier for Team HKS, winning multiple races. He took forth place overall in 1994 against the likes of Tom Kristensen, Steve Soper and Joachim Winkelhock. This led to him joining BMS Scuderia Italia, who were running the works Nissan team in Europe. After a promising 1996 season, Reid was picked up by RML who had won the works contract from Nissan to race in 1997 in the British Touring Car Championship alongside David Leslie. The Primera was brand new and needed development, but the speed he showed in this season was translated into consistent results in 1998, when he fought for the title up to the final round, losing out to Sweden's Rickard Rydell. In 1999, he joined Prodrive who had the works Ford contract, to help develop their Mondeo. Again he struggled in his first season while setting up the car. The closest Reid would come to winning the title was in 2000. A collision in the very last round of the season cost him the championship by two points to team-mate Alain Menu.

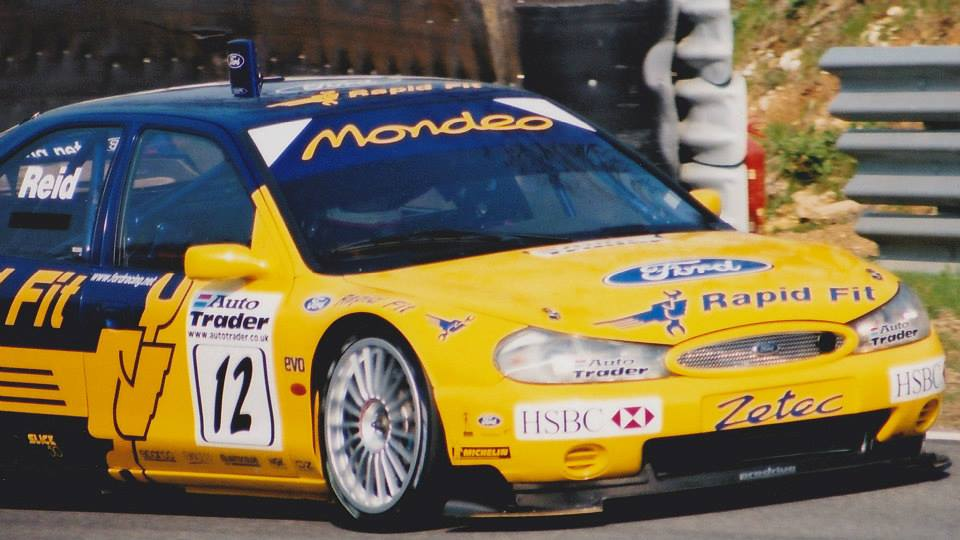
Reid driving for Ford in the 2000 British Touring Car Championship.

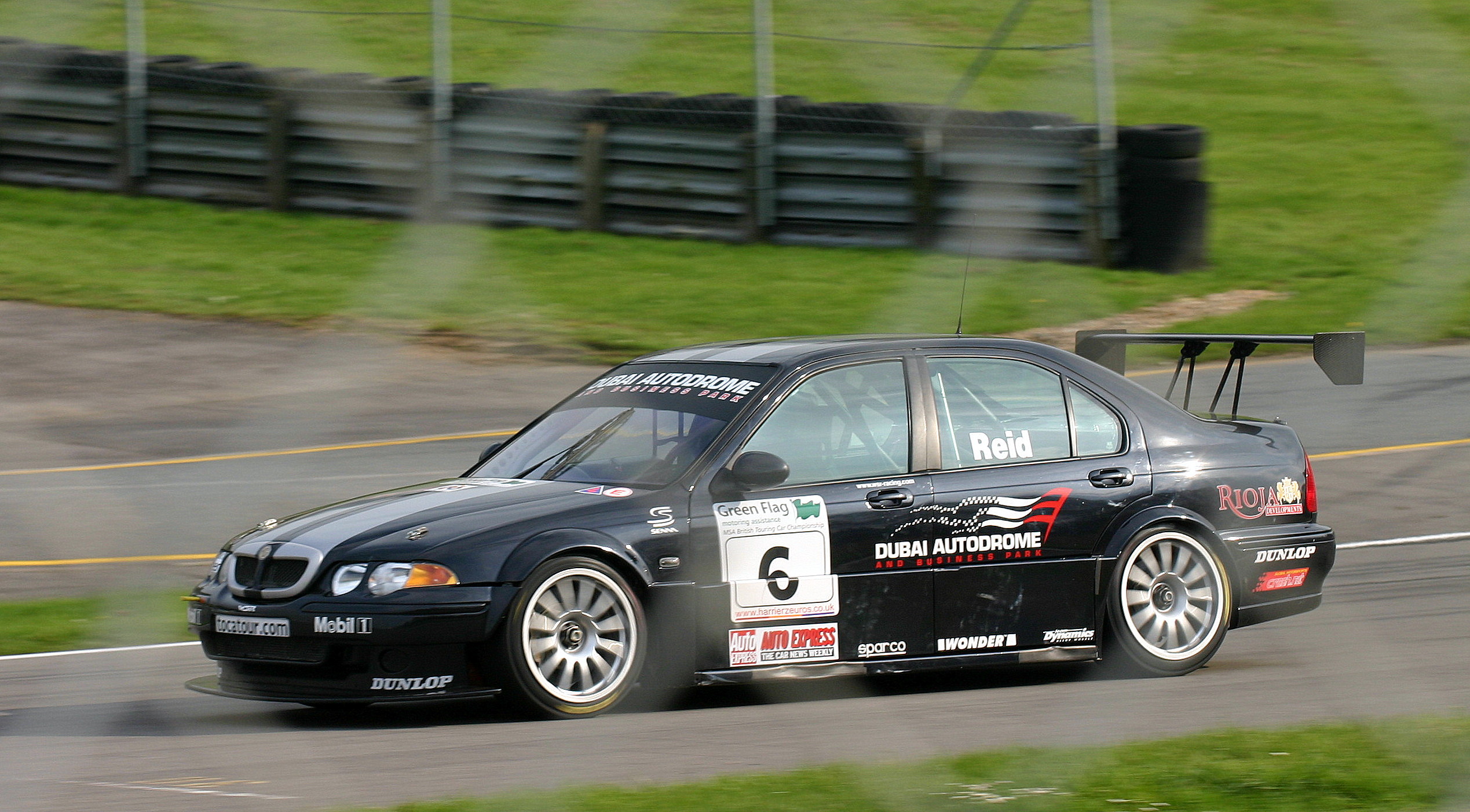
Reid driving the West Surrey Racing MG ZS at Brands Hatch during the 2004 British Touring Car Championship season.

For 2001, Reid joined West Surrey Racing (WSR) as they developed an MG ZS, not racing until the end of the season but still finding time to win the final race of the season, although the team was not eligible for points. He drove for the team for the next three seasons, although for 2004 MG pulled out and WSR ran the car privately, only finding the funds to run Reid (whose contract was owned by MG rather than WSR) alongside the better-funded Colin Turkington a few days before the season opened. Against all odds this season was the closest he came to winning the title in this car, also winning the Independent's cup ahead of Matt Neal. For 2005 WSR was unable to find the funds for him to race, and his planned racing with MG in Germany was scrapped when the company folded.

Reid later turned to the Argentinian TC2000 series, helping Honda Petrobras to develop their Honda Civic for competition as well as racing it. He won the 200 km de Buenos Aires in 2008 racing with José María 'Pechito' López.

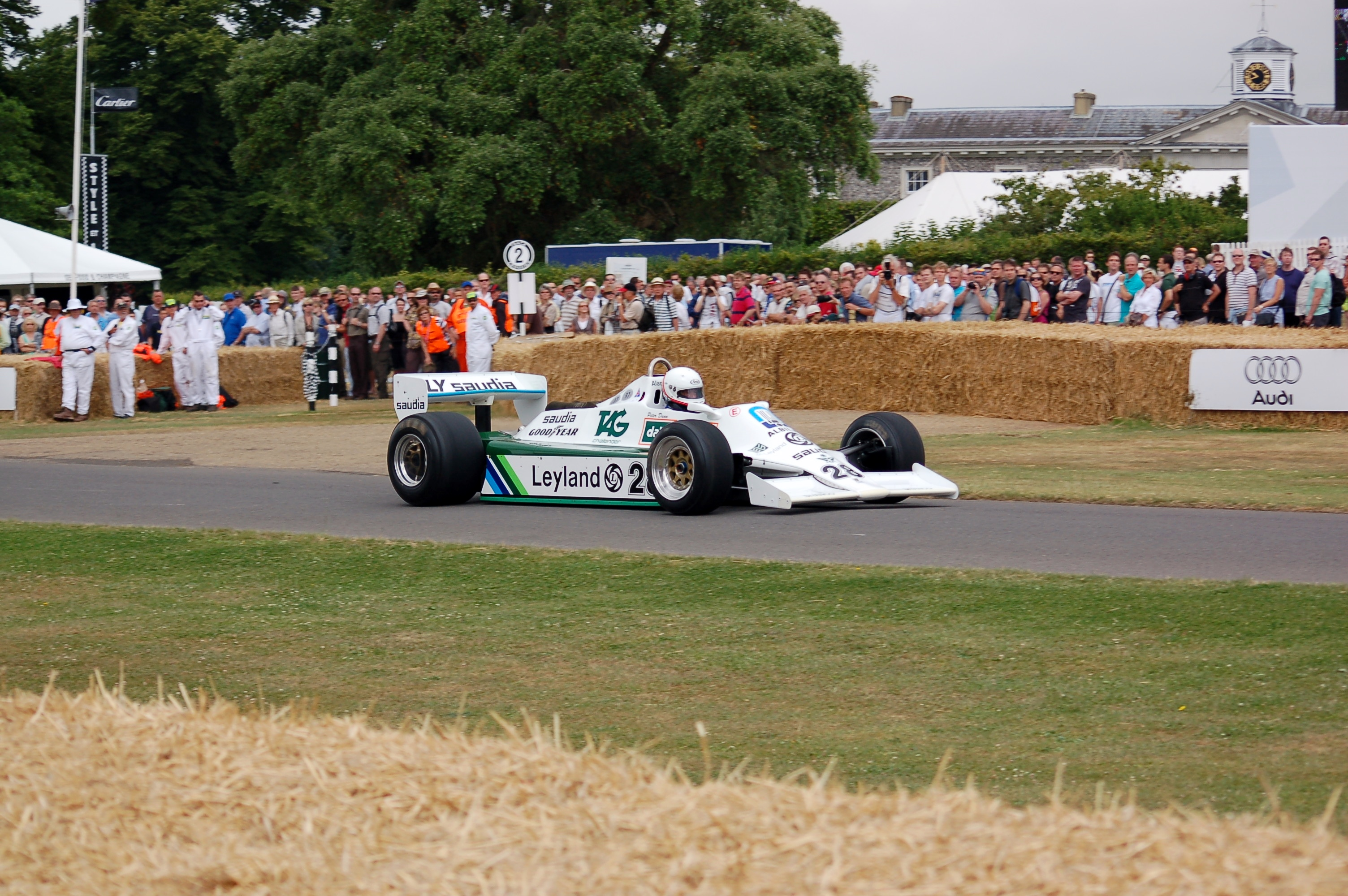
Reid demonstrating a 1980 Williams-Ford FW07B at the Goodwood Festival of Speed 2009

Reid has also participated in the Goodwood Festival of Speed, setting the fastest time of the shootout in 2007 and 2012.

Reid returned to the BTCC for the final three rounds of the 2009 season for WSR, entered under the Team RAC banner. He was entered in a third car alongside regular drivers Turkington and Stephen Jelley in an attempt to bolster Turkington's championship chances.

Reid drove a Chevron GR8 at racing events in the British GT Championship and also Britcar MSA British Endurance championship in 2012 and 2013.

Since 2016, Reid has competed in the FunCup UK Championship with Iron Maiden sponsored Team Trooper.

== Top Gear appearances ==
Reid had appeared in Top Gear series 10 episode 6 driving a nimble Toyota motorhome. In series 12 episode 5, he raced a single tier bus against other touring car drivers. He won both races.

Reid was involved in an attempt to speed up airport transport on Top Gear, driving a catering truck against other various Touring Car colleagues. The race culminated with Reid being the only racing driver left against Hammond, however the vehicle became unbalanced (after Reid ejected his crockery to lose some weight). The truck listed to one side and eventually fell over, allowing Hammond to win.

Reid appeared again in Series 20, Episode 2 when he drove a Lincoln Town Car stretch limousine in a taxi race. The race ended with the limousine being split in half.

== Racing record ==
=== 24 Hours of Le Mans results ===
Year	Team	Co-Drivers	Car	Class	Laps	Pos.	Class Pos.
1990	(Japan) Alpha Racing Team	(United Kingdom) Tiff Needell (United Kingdom) David Sears	Porsche 962C	C1	352	**3rd**	**3rd**
1991	(Austria) Konrad Motorsport	(Austria) Franz Konrad (Switzerland) Pierre-Alain Lombardi	Porsche 962C	C2	98	DNF	DNF
1996	(United Kingdom) Newcastle United Lister	(United Kingdom) Geoff Lees (United Kingdom) Tiff Needell	Lister Storm GTS	GT1	295	19th	11th
2001	(United Kingdom) MG Sport & Racing Ltd.	(United Kingdom) Warren Hughes (United Kingdom) Jonny Kane	MG-Lola EX257	LMP675	30	DNF	DNF
2002	(United Kingdom) MG Sport & Racing Ltd.	(United Kingdom) Warren Hughes (United Kingdom) Jonny Kane	MG-Lola EX257	LMP675	129	DNF	DNF
2005	(United Kingdom) Scuderia Ecosse	(United Kingdom) Andrew Kirkaldy (United Kingdom) Nathan Kinch	Ferrari 360 Modena GTC	GT2	70	DNF	DNF

=== Complete Japanese Formula Three Championship results ===
(key) (Races in bold indicate pole position) (Races in italics indicate fastest lap)

Year	Entrant	Engine	1	2	3	4	5	6	7	8	9	10	DC	Pts
1992	Tomei Sports	Mugen	**SUZ**; 1	TSU; 1	FUJ; 1	**SUZ**; 1	SEN; 24	AID; 2	MIN; 7	**SUG**; 1	SUZ; 6	SUZ; 4	**1st**	**54**
1993	Tomei Sports	Opel	SUZ; Ret	TSU; 9	FUJ; 11	SUZ; 6	**SEN**; 1	AID; 3	MIN; Ret	SUG; 3	**SUZ**; 1	**SUZ**; 1	**3rd**	**36**

=== Complete Japanese Formula 3000 results ===
(key) (Races in bold indicate pole position; races in italics indicate fastest lap)

Year	Entrant	1	2	3	4	5	6	7	8	9	10	11	DC	Points
1993	Super Evolution Racing	SUZ	FUJ	MIN	SUZ	AUT	SUG	FUJ	FUJ; Ret	SUZ; 14	FUJ; Ret	SUZ; Ret	NC	0

=== Complete Japanese Touring Car Championship results ===
(key) (Races in bold indicate pole position) (Races in italics indicate fastest lap)

Year	Team	Car	Class	1	2	3	4	5	6	7	8	9	10	11	12	13	14	15	16	17	18	DC	Pts
1992	Team Taisan	BMW M3 Sport Evolution	JTC-2	AID	AUT	SUG; 8	SUZ	MIN	TSU	SEN	FUJ											20th	20
1993	Asahi Kiko Sport Team	BMW M3 Sport Evolution	JTC-2	MIN; 10	AUT; 7	SUG; 9	SUZ; 16	AID; 6	TSU; 8	TOK; 9	SEN; 7	FUJ; 7										**3rd**	**117**
1994	Team HKS	Vauxhall Cavalier		AUT; 1; 1	**AUT**; **2**; 1	SUG; 1 Ret	SUG; 2 DNS	TOK; 1; 1	**TOK**; **2**; 3	SUZ; 1; 12	SUZ; 2; 5	MIN; 1; 7	MIN; 2; 8	**AID**; **1** Ret	AID; 2; 7	TSU; 1; 5	TSU; 2 Ret	SEN; 1; 9	SEN; 2 Ret	FUJ; 1; 2	FUJ; 2; 1	4th	106
1995	HKS Opel Team Japan	Opel Vectra GT		FUJ; 1; 2	FUJ; 2; 3	SUG; 1 Ret	SUG; 2; 16	TOK; 1; 19	TOK; 2; 8	**SUZ**; **1**; 1	**SUZ**; **2**; 3	**MIN**; **1**; 8	MIN; 2; 1	AID; 1; 5	AID; 2; 1	SEN; 1 DSQ	SEN; 2 DNS	FUJ; 1	FUJ; 2			4th	87
1996	BMS Scuderia Italia	Nissan Primera GTe		FUJ; 1	FUJ; 2	SUG; 1	SUG; 2	SUZ; 1	SUZ; 2	MIN; 1	MIN; 2	SEN; 1	SEN; 2	TOK; 1	TOK; 2	FUJ; 1; 2	FUJ; 2; 1					13th	27

=== Complete JGTC results ===
(key) (Races in bold indicate pole position) (Races in italics indicate fastest lap)

Year	Team	Car	Class	1	2	3	4	5	6	7	DC	Pts
1994	Team Taisan	Porsche 962C	GT1	**FUJ**; Ret		**FUJ**; 1		MIN; 3			5th	44
1994	Team Taisan	Ferrari F40	GT1		SEN; 3		**SUG**; Ret				5th	44
1995	Team Taisan	Ferrari F40	GT1	SUZ; 11	FUJ; Ret						7th	36
1995	Team Taisan	Porsche 911	GT1			SEN; 3	FUJ; 9	SUG; 1	MIN; 9		7th	36
1996	Team Taisan	Porsche 911	GT500	SUZ; 12	FUJ	SEN	FUJ				NC	0
1996	Team Taisan	Ferrari F40	GT500					SUG; 15	MIN		NC	0
1998	Team Taisan	Dodge Viper	GT500	SUZ	FUJ	SEN	FUJ	MOT	MIN	SUG; 10	21st	1

=== Complete Super Tourenwagen Cup results ===
(key) (Races in bold indicate pole position) (Races in italics indicate fastest lap)

Year	Team	Car	1	2	3	4	5	6	7	8	9	10	11	12	13	14	15	16	17	18	DC	Pts
1996	Nissan Primera Racing	Nissan Primera GTe	ZOL; 1; 22	ZOL; 2 Ret	ASS; 1; 17	ASS; 2; 11	HOC; 1; 12	HOC; 2 Ret	SAC; 1; 20	SAC; 2; 17	WUN; 1; 7	WUN; 2 Ret	ZWE; 1; 14	ZWE; 2 Ret	SAL; 1; 3	SAL; 2; 3	AVU; 1	AVU; 2	NÜR; 1 Ret	NÜR; 2; 9	18th	147

=== Complete British Touring Car Championship results ===
(key) Races in bold indicate pole position (1 point awarded – 1997–2002 all races, 2003–present just for first race) Races in italics indicate fastest lap (1 point awarded – 2000 onwards all races) * signifies that driver lead race for at least one lap (1 point awarded – 1998–2002 just in feature races, 2003–present all races)

Year	Team	Car	Class	1	2	3	4	5	6	7	8	9	10	11	12	13	14	15	16	17	18	19	20	21	22	23	24	25	26	27	28	29	30	DC	Pts
1997	Vodafone Nissan Racing	Nissan Primera GT		DON; 1 Ret	DON; 2 Ret	SIL; 1 Ret	SIL; 2 Ret	THR; 1; 8	THR; 2; 4	BRH; 1; 5	BRH; 2; 14	OUL; 1; 7	OUL; 2 Ret	DON; 1; 11	DON; 2 Ret	CRO; 1 Ret	CRO; 2; 8	KNO; 1; 5	KNO; 2 Ret	SNE; 1 Ret	SNE; 2; 10	THR; 1; 13	THR; 2 Ret	BRH; 1 Ret	**BRH**; **2**; 2	SIL; 1; 2	SIL; 2 Ret							11th	56
1998	Vodafone Nissan Racing	Nissan Primera GT		THR; 1; 8	THR; 2; 13	SIL; 1; 7	SIL; 2; 3	DON; 1 Ret	DON; 2; 6	BRH; 1; 2	BRH; 2; 3	OUL; 1; 5	**OUL**; **2**; 3*	**DON**; **1**; 1	**DON**; **2** Ret*	CRO; 1; 2	CRO; 2; 3	**SNE**; **1**; 1	**SNE**; **2** NC	THR; 1; 1	**THR**; **2**; 6	**KNO**; **1**; 1	**KNO**; **2**; 7	**BRH**; **1**; 1	BRH; 2; 2*	**OUL**; **1**; 2	**OUL**; **2**; 1*	SIL; 1; 5	SIL; 2; 1*					**2nd**	**239**
1999	Ford Team Mondeo	Ford Mondeo		DON; 1 Ret	DON; 2 Ret	SIL; 1; 7	SIL; 2 DSQ	THR; 1; 8	THR; 2 Ret	BRH; 1; 2	BRH; 2; 8	OUL; 1; 4	OUL; 2; 5	DON; 1; 11	DON; 2; 9	CRO; 1 Ret	CRO; 2; 10*	SNE; 1 Ret	SNE; 2; 11	THR; 1 Ret	THR; 2; 7*	KNO; 1; 4	KNO; 2 Ret	BRH; 1; 8	BRH; 2; 12*	OUL; 1; 12	OUL; 2; 8	SIL; 1; 4	SIL; 2; 3					12th	78
2000	Ford Team Mondeo	Ford Mondeo	S	BRH; 1 ovr:5 cls:5	BRH; 2 ovr:2* cls:2	DON; 1 ovr:3 cls:3	DON; 2 ovr:4 cls:4	THR; 1 ovr:2 cls:2	THR; 2 ovr:4 cls:4	KNO; 1 ovr:3 cls:3	KNO; 2 ovr:3 cls:3	OUL; 1 ovr:5 cls:5	OUL; 2 ovr:3 cls:3	SIL; 1 ovr:2 cls:2	SIL; 2 Ret	CRO; 1 ovr:2 cls:2	CRO; 2 DSQ	SNE; 1 ovr:4 cls:4	SNE; 2 ovr:6 cls:6	DON; 1 ovr:1 cls:1	DON; 2 ovr:3* cls:3	BRH; 1 ovr:8 cls:8	BRH; 2 ovr:4 cls:4	**OUL**; **1** ovr:1 cls:1	OUL; 2 ovr:2* cls:2	SIL; 1 ovr:7 cls:7	SIL; 2 Ret*							**2nd**	**193**
2001	MG Sport & Racing	MG ZS	T	BRH; 1	BRH; 2	THR; 1	THR; 2	OUL; 1	OUL; 2	SIL; 1	SIL; 2	MON; 1	MON; 2	DON; 1	DON; 2	KNO; 1	KNO; 2	SNE; 1	SNE; 2	CRO; 1	CRO; 2	OUL; 1	OUL; 2	SIL; 1 ovr:12 cls:6	SIL; 2 ovr:7 cls:7	DON; 1 ovr:10 cls:4	DON; 2 Ret	BRH; 1 ovr:1 cls:1	BRH; 2 Ret					NC†	0†
2002	MG Sport & Racing	MG ZS	T	BRH; 1 ovr:4 cls:4	BRH; 2 ovr:3 cls:3	OUL; 1 ovr:5 cls:5	OUL; 2 Ret	THR; 1 ovr:3 cls:3	THR; 2 Ret*	SIL; 1 DSQ	**SIL**; **2** ovr:2* cls:2	MON; 1 ovr:5 cls:5	MON; 2 ovr:4* cls:4	CRO; 1 Ret	CRO; 2 ovr:3 cls:3	SNE; 1 ovr:4 cls:4	SNE; 2 ovr:10 cls:10	KNO; 1 ovr:2 cls:2	KNO; 2 ovr:6* cls:6	**BRH**; **1** ovr:1 cls:1	BRH; 2 ovr:5* cls:5	DON; 1 ovr:4 cls:4	DON; 2 ovr:8 cls:8											4th	136
2003	MG Sport & Racing	MG ZS	T	MON; 1 Ret	MON; 2 Ret	BRH; 1 ovr:4 cls:4	BRH; 2 ovr:4 cls:4	THR; 1 Ret	THR; 2 ovr:4* cls:4	SIL; 1 ovr:10 cls:10	SIL; 2 ovr:4* cls:4	ROC; 1 ovr:6 cls:6	ROC; 2 ovr:2* cls:2	CRO; 1 ovr:5 cls:5	CRO; 2 ovr:1* cls:1	SNE; 1 ovr:5 cls:5	SNE; 2 ovr:3 cls:3	BRH; 1 ovr:7 cls:7	BRH; 2 ovr:4 cls:4	DON; 1 Ret	DON; 2 ovr:9 cls:9	OUL; 1 ovr:5 cls:5	OUL; 2 ovr:4 cls:4											6th	121
2004	West Surrey Racing	MG ZS		THR; 1; 4	THR; 2; 6	THR; 3; 2	BRH; 1 Ret	BRH; 2; 4	BRH; 3; 2	SIL; 1; 6	SIL; 2; 3	SIL; 3; 4*	OUL; 1; 10	**OUL**; **2**; 3	OUL; 3 Ret	MON; 1; 2	MON; 2; 5	MON; 3; 9	**CRO**; **1**; 1*	CRO; 2; 8	CRO; 3; 6	**KNO**; **1**; 1*	KNO; 2; 7	KNO; 3; 1*	BRH; 1; 12	BRH; 2 Ret	BRH; 3; 6	SNE; 1; 8	SNE; 2; 2	SNE; 3; 5	DON; 1; 5	DON; 2; 4	DON; 3; 8	4th	213
2009	Team RAC	BMW 320si		BRH; 1	BRH; 2	BRH; 3	THR; 1	THR; 2	THR; 3	DON; 1	DON; 2	DON; 3	OUL; 1	OUL; 2	OUL; 3	CRO; 1	CRO; 2	CRO; 3	SNE; 1	SNE; 2	SNE; 3	KNO; 1	KNO; 2	KNO; 3	SIL; 1 Ret	SIL; 2; 14	SIL; 3; 12	ROC; 1; 11	ROC; 2; 12	ROC; 3 Ret	BRH; 1; 10	BRH; 2 Ret	BRH; 3; 7	20th	5

† Not eligible for points

=== Complete 24 Hours of Spa results ===
Year	Team	Co-Drivers	Car	Class	Laps	Pos.	Class Pos.
1998	(Belgium) Belgacom Nissan T.U.R.B.O Team	(Belgium) Vincent Vosse (Sweden) Anders Olofsson	Nissan Primera	SP	?/engine	DNF	DNF

=== Britcar 24 Hour results ===
Year	Team	Co-Drivers	Car	Car No.	Class	Laps	Pos.	Class Pos.
2007	(United Kingdom) RJN Motorsport	(United Kingdom) Alex Buncombe (United Kingdom) Owen Mildenhall (Denmark) Kurt Thiim	Nissan 350Z	40	GTC	50	23rd	8th

=== Partial British GT results ===
(key) (Races in bold indicate pole position in class) (Races in italics indicate fastest lap in class)

Year	Team	Car	Class	1	2	3	4	5	6	7	8	9	10	11	12	13	14	DC	Pts
2008	Chad Racing	Ferrari F430	GT3	OUL; 1	OUL; 2	KNO; 1	KNO; 2	ROC; 1; 15	ROC; 2; 8	SNE; 1; 7	SNE; 2; 11	THR; 1	THR; 2	BRH; 1	BRH; 2	SIL	DON	45th	3
2011	Chevron Racing Cars	Chevron GR8	GTC	OUL; 1; 12	**OUL**; **2**; 12	**SNE**; 19	BRH; 12	SPA; 1	SPA; 2	ROC; 1	ROC; 2	**DON**; 12	**SIL**; 15					**1st**	**100**
2012	Chevron Racing Cars	Chevron GR8	Inv	OUL; 1; 24	OUL; 2; 21	NÜR; 1	NÜR; 2	ROC; 14	BRH	SNE; 1; 21	SNE; 2; 7	SIL; 23	DON; 20					NC†	0†

† Not eligible for points.

Sporting positions
Preceded by Paulo Carcasci	All-Japan Formula Three; Champion; 1992	Succeeded by Tom Kristensen
Preceded by Juan Manuel Silva; Ezequiel Bosio	Winner of the 200 km de Buenos Aires; 2008 (with José María López)	Succeeded by Norberto Fontana; Ricardo Mauricio
