= Patrick Watts =

British racing driver (born 1956)

- Nationality: (United Kingdom) British
- Born: Aubrey Patrick Watts; 21 November 1955 (age 70) Farnborough, Kent, England
- Relatives: Aimée Watts (daugher)

British Saloon / Touring Car Championship
- Years active: 1983–1985, 1987–1988, 1992–1997
- Teams: Roger Dowson Engineering; North Essex Motorsport; Chris Hodgetts Motor Sport; Mazda Racing Team; Peugeot Sport; Motor Sport Developments
- Starts: 146
- Wins: 0 (3 in class)
- Poles: 1
- Fastest laps: 4
- Best finish: 8th in 1994

Aubrey Patrick Watts (born 21 November 1955) is a British racing driver. He excelled in single make series in the eighties and competed in saloons in the nineties, mainly in the British Touring Car Championship. He still makes occasional appearances in historic racing events. His daughter, Aimée Watts, currently competes in the Porsche Sprint Challenge GB.

== Racing career ==
=== Early career ===
Watts' first title came in 1979, winning the National Mini 850 Championship. Between 1980 and 1982 he drove in various saloon cars before getting his first taste of the BTCC for the Rover Metro Team in 1983 and 1984. In 1986, he raced in the Fiat Uno Turbo Championship. More titles followed, winning the inaugural Honda CRX Championship in 1988, and again in 1990. Also that year, he won the Mazda MX5 championship. In 1991, he stepped up to the ESSO Production Saloon Car Championship, winning yet another title with a Peugeot 309.

=== BTCC Mazda ===
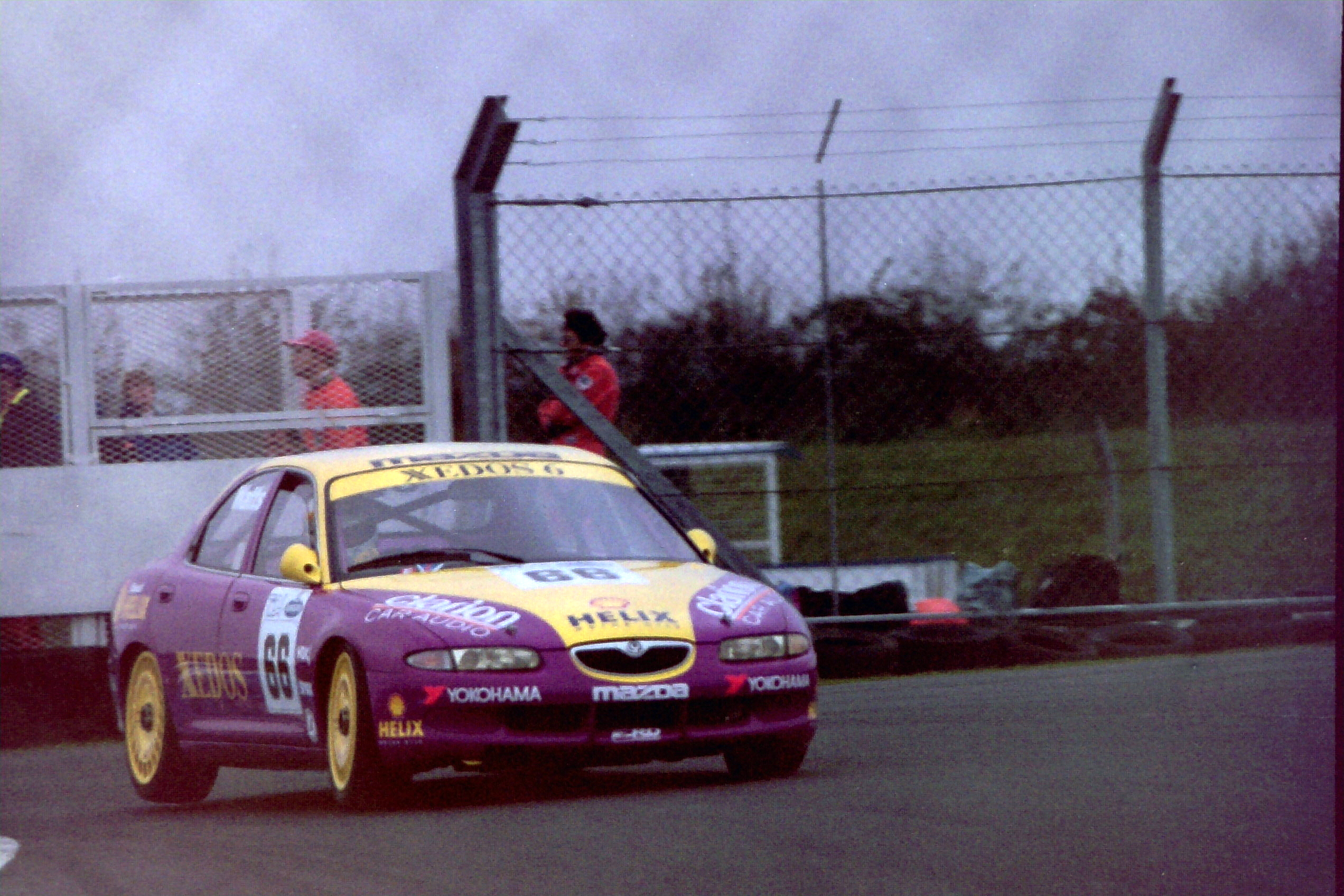
Watts driving for Mazda at Donington Park during the 1993 TOCA Shootout.

Watts' success in 1991 earned him a drive in the 1992 British Touring Car Championship for the new works Shell Mazda Racing Team in a Mazda 323. The one car the team put out was not on the pace of most of the other works teams, and he finished the season in sixteenth place. In 1993, the team switched to a distinctively painted single Mazda Xedos 6. The new car performed much better than the 323 although easily down on power compared to its rivals. The Xedos did manage to get some promising results throughout the year; Watts led races and qualified on the front row on more than one occasion. He took pole position at Snetterton, only to collide with Steve Soper at the first corner, damaging his car enough to prevent him from taking the restart. Unfortunately his season was spoiled by often being caught up in several incidents, and he ended the championship in fifteenth place. Mazda did not continue to run a team in 1994, despite showing promise in 1993 [although a team of two semi-works cars ran half of the season].

=== BTCC Peugeot ===
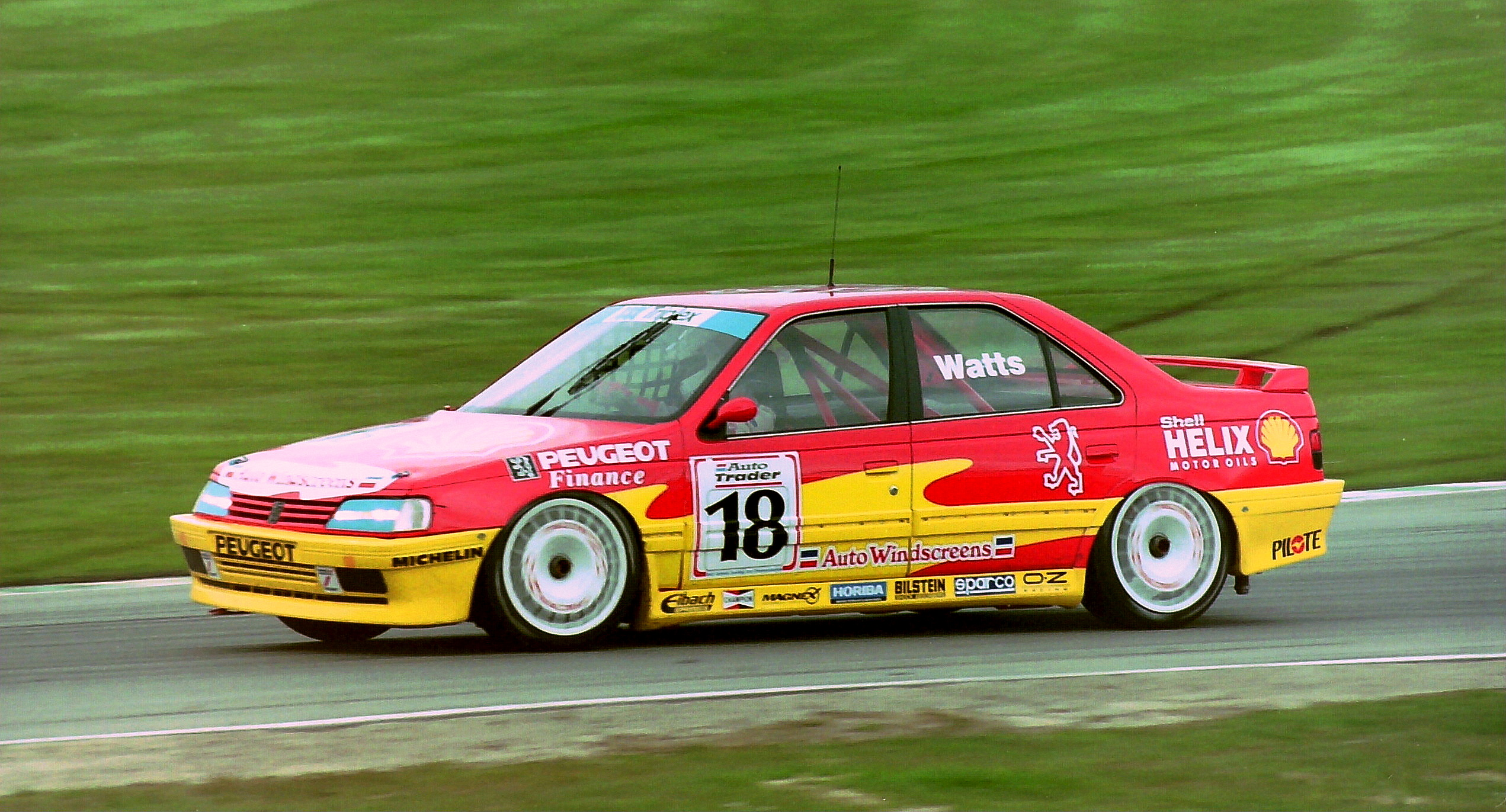
Watts driving for Peugeot at Brands Hatch during the 1994 British Touring Car Championship season.

In 1994, Watts replaced Robb Gravett in the Peugeot Sport team with the Peugeot 405. A good year for both driver and team saw him end the year in eighth place, including four podium finishes. Team mate for 1994, Eugene O'Brien, was replaced by newcomer Simon Harrison in 1995. A slightly more troubled season ended with Watts in tenth place with two podiums.

The new look Total Team Peugeot had a new car in 1996 with the Peugeot 406, along with a new teammate for Watts. Harrison was replaced with 1992 champion and fellow Farnborough racer Tim Harvey. The car failed to perform on the track, and he finished one down in sixteenth place, one position behind Harvey the lowest position for a works driver.

Despite higher hopes for 1997 with MSD running the team, the car performed little better despite an improvement towards the end of the season. In Germany, the car was dominating but the British effort struggled mainly due to internal team problems and budget restrictions. He once again finished the year down in sixteenth. With the team struggling, he left at the end of the year following a final race at that year's Bathurst 1000 teamed with Neil Crompton, but failing to finish. He was replaced in 1998 by Paul Radisich who found the team a problem also and fared even worse than Patrick.

=== Post BTCC ===
Watts competed in the first two rounds of the Australian Super Touring Championship in 1999 (Peugeot 406), winning one race at round one and finishing second in both races of round two After that he has done a few rallies including the Armajaro British Historic Rally Championship which he won in 2006 and finished second in 2007. His Touring Car efforts of the nineties were recognised in 2004 when he was selected to drive in the BTCC Masters, where his race ended after a collision with Jason Plato.

Watts now competes in an Allard J2 and FIA mustang and has recently bought the ex-works Computervision MG Metro Turbo he used in BTCC in 1984 and Peugeot 406 that he used successfully in Australia in 1999.

In 2017, Watts drove in the Dunlop Endurance championship in Cuda Drinks-entered Ginetta G50 with Richard Burrows. They finished 24th in race one and 13th in race two at Silverstone.

Watts is CEO of recycling company Sweeep Kuusakoski, one of the biggest recyclers of electronic components in the world.

== Racing record ==
=== Complete British Saloon / Touring Car Championship results ===
(key) (Races in bold indicate pole position - 1 point awarded 1996 onwards all races, 1983-88 in class) (Races in italics indicate fastest lap - 1 point awarded 1983-88 in class)

Year	Team	Car	Class	1	2	3	4	5	6	7	8	9	10	11	12	13	14	15	16	17	18	19	20	21	22	23	24	25	26	Overall DC	Pts	Class
1983	Unipart with Daily Express	MG Metro	C	SIL	OUL ovr:? cls:?	THR ovr:12 cls:4	BRH ovr:14 cls:6	THR ovr:13 cls:5	SIL ovr:10 cls:4	DON; Ret																				18th	9	10th
1983	Unipart with Daily Express	MG Metro Turbo	B								**SIL** ovr:21 cls:3	DON; Ret	BRH; Ret	SIL ovr:18 cls:4																20th	7	5th
1984	Computervision Racing with Esso	MG Metro Turbo	B	**DON** ovr:9 cls:1	**SIL** ovr:6 cls:1	**OUL**; DNS	**THR** ovr:7 cls:1	**THR**; Ret	SIL; Ret	SNE	BRH	BRH	DON	SIL																WD	0	WD
1985	North Essex Motorsport	Ford Escort RS1600i	C	SIL	OUL	THR; Ret	DON ovr:13 cls:3	THR; DNS	SIL; NC	DON	SIL; Ret	SNE ovr:16 cls:7	BRH ovr:13 cls:6	BRH ovr:16 cls:5	SIL; Ret															20th	7	7th
1987	North Essex Motorsport	Ford Escort RS1600i	D	SIL	OUL	THR	THR	SIL	SIL	BRH	SNE ovr:10 cls:3	DON	OUL	DON	SIL															NC†	0†	NC†
1988	Chris Hodgetts Motor Sport	Toyota Corolla GT	D	SIL	OUL	THR	DON ovr:21‡ cls:5‡	THR	SIL	SIL	BRH	SNE	BRH	BIR	DON	SIL														55th	2	16th
1992	Shell Mazda Racing Team	Mazda 323F		SIL; Ret	THR; 12	OUL; 14	SNE; 11	BRH; Ret	DON; 1; 12	DON; 2 Ret	SIL; Ret	KNO; 1 Ret	KNO; 2; 5	PEM; 11	BRH; 1; 8	BRH; 2 Ret	DON; Ret	SIL; 11												18th	5	
1993	Mazda Racing Team	Mazda Xedos 6		SIL; 6	DON; Ret	**SNE**; DNS	DON; 4	OUL; Ret	BRH; 1; 10	BRH; 2 Ret	PEM; Ret	SIL; Ret	KNO; 1; 4	KNO; 2; 4	OUL; Ret	BRH; 8	THR; 12	DON; 1 Ret	DON; 2 DNS	SIL; 12										15th	29	
1994	Peugeot Sport	Peugeot 405 Mi16		THR; 7	BRH; 1; 7	BRH; 2; 8	SNE; 5	SIL; 1; 5	SIL; 2; 3	OUL; 3	DON; 1; 7	DON; 2; 11	BRH; 1; 3	BRH; 2; 3	SIL; 6	KNO; 1; 15	KNO; 2 Ret	OUL; 8	BRH; 1; 6	BRH; 2 DNS	SIL; 1 Ret	SIL; 2 Ret	DON; 1; 7	DON; 2; 11						8th	98	
1995	Total Team Peugeot	Peugeot 405 Mi16		DON; 1; 13	DON; 2; 11	BRH; 1; 8	BRH; 2 DNS	THR; 1; 3	THR; 2 Ret	SIL; 1; 6	SIL; 2; 10	OUL; 1 Ret	OUL; 2; 13	BRH; 1; 5	BRH; 2; 8	DON; 1; 15	DON; 2 Ret	SIL; 10	KNO; 1 DNS	KNO; 2; 11	BRH; 1; 11	BRH; 2; 6	SNE; 1; 2	SNE; 2 Ret	OUL; 1 Ret	OUL; 2 Ret	SIL; 1; 11	SIL; 2; 8		10th	61	
1996	Total Team Peugeot	Peugeot 406		DON; 1 Ret	DON; 2 Ret	BRH; 1; 8	BRH; 2; 10	THR; 1 Ret	THR; 2; 10	SIL; 1; 12	SIL; 2 Ret	OUL; 1; 11	OUL; 2; 11	SNE; 1 Ret	SNE; 2; 12	BRH; 1 Ret	BRH; 2; 15	SIL; 1 Ret	SIL; 2 Ret	KNO; 1 Ret	KNO; 2 DNS	OUL; 1 Ret	OUL; 2 DNS	THR; 1 Ret	THR; 2 Ret	DON; 1 Ret	DON; 2 Ret	BRH; 1; 10	BRH; 2; 11	16th	6	
1997	Esso Ultron Team Peugeot	Peugeot 406		DON; 1; 8	DON; 2 Ret	SIL; 1; 9	SIL; 2; 8	THR; 1; 12	THR; 2 Ret	BRH; 1 Ret	BRH; 2 Ret	OUL; 1 Ret	OUL; 2; 15	DON; 1; 10	DON; 2; 5	CRO; 1; 11	CRO; 2; 16	KNO; 1; 18	KNO; 2; 8	SNE; 1 Ret	SNE; 2 Ret	THR; 1; 12	THR; 2 Ret	BRH; 1; 8	BRH; 2; 10	SIL; 1; 9	SIL; 2; 9			16th	26	

† Not eligible for points.

‡ Endurance driver.

=== Complete European Touring Car Championship results ===
(key) (Races in bold indicate pole position) (Races in italics indicate fastest lap)

Year	Team	Car	1	2	3	4	5	6	7	8	9	10	11	12	DC	Pts
1983	(United Kingdom) **Unipart with Daily Express**	MG Metro Turbo	MNZ	VAL	DON	PER	MUG	BRN	ZEL	NUR	SAL	SPA	SIL; Ret	ZOL	NC	0
1984	(United Kingdom) **Computervision Racing with Esso**	MG Metro Turbo	MNZ	VAL	DON; Ret	PER	BRN	ZEL	SAL	NUR	SPA	SIL	ZOL	MUG	NC	0
1988	(United Kingdom) **Chris Hodgetts Motorsport**	Toyota Corolla GT	MNZ	DON	EST	JAR	DIJ	VAL	NÜR	SPA	ZOL	SIL; 33	NOG		NC	0

=== Complete Australian Super Touring Championship results ===
(key) (Races in bold indicate pole position - 1 point awarded) (Races in italics indicate fastest lap)

Year	Team	Car	1	2	3	4	5	6	7	8	9	10	11	12	13	14	15	16	17	18	19	20	21	DC	Pts
1999	Starion Enterprises	Peugeot 406	LAK; 1 DNS	LAK; 2; 1	ORA; 1; 2	ORA; 2; 2	MAL; 1	MAL; 2	WIN; 1	WIN; 2	WIN; 3	ORA; 1	ORA; 2	ORA; 3	QLD; 1	QLD; 2	QLD; 3	ORA; 1	ORA; 2	ORA; 3	CAL; 1	CAL; 2	CAL; 3	9th	40

=== Complete Bathurst 1000 results ===
Year	Team	Co-driver	Car	Laps	Pos.
1997*	(United Kingdom) Esso Ultron Team Peugeot	(Australia) Neil Crompton	Peugeot 406	112	DNF

* Super Touring race

=== Complete Britcar results ===
(key) (Races in bold indicate pole position in class – 1 point awarded just in first race) (Races in italics indicate fastest lap in class – 1 point awarded all races)

Year	Team	Car	Class	1	2	3	4	5	6	7	8	9	10	11	12	13	14	15	DC	CP	Points
2017	Cuda Drinks	Ginetta G50	E4	SIL; 1	SIL; 2	SNE; 1	SNE; 2	SIL; 1; 24	SIL; 2; 13	**BRH**; **1**; 16	BRH; 1; 10	DON; 1	DON; 2	OUL; 1	OUL; 2	SIL	BRH; 1	BRH; 2	19th	3rd	59
