= 1982 British Saloon Car Championship =

25th season of the British Touring Car Championship

Seasons
- ← 1981 1983 →

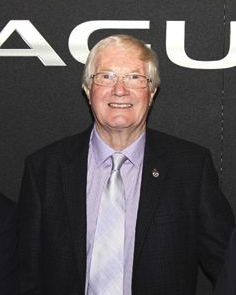
Win Percy successfully defended his title to become the 1982 BSCC champion, winning three consecutively.

The 1982 RAC Tricentrol British Saloon Car Championship was the 25th season of the championship. The championship was open to saloon cars complying with FIA Appendix J Group 1 regulations. Win Percy won his third consecutive title, this time driving a class C Toyota Corolla. In doing so, he became the fourth driver to win three BSCC championships.

== Teams and drivers ==
Team	Car	No.	Drivers	Rounds
Class D
Team Sanyo Racing with Esso; Hepolite Glacier Racing	Rover 3500 S	1	(United Kingdom) Jeff Allam	All
Team Sanyo Racing with Esso; Hepolite Glacier Racing	Rover 3500 S	2	(United Kingdom) Frank Sytner	1–4
Team Sanyo Racing with Esso; Hepolite Glacier Racing	Rover 3500 S	2	(United Kingdom) Tom Walkinshaw	4
Team Sanyo Racing with Esso; Hepolite Glacier Racing	Rover 3500 S	19	(United Kingdom) Pete Lovett	5–11
Equipe Esso	Ford Capri III 3.0S	3	(United Kingdom) Vince Woodman	All
Equipe Esso	Ford Capri III 3.0S	4	(United Kingdom) Jonathan Buncombe	11
Patrick Motorsport with Duckhams Oil/ ICI Petrol	Rover 3500 S	5	(South Africa) Rad Dougall	1–8
Patrick Motorsport with Duckhams Oil/ ICI Petrol	Rover 3500 S	6	(Australia) Brian Muir	6, 8–11
Gordon Spice Racing	Ford Capri III 3.0S	8	(United Kingdom) Gordon Spice	All
Gordon Spice Racing	Ford Capri III 3.0S	9	(United Kingdom) Andy Rouse	All
Dennis Leech	Rover 3500 S	12	(United Kingdom) Dennis Leech	1, 3–8, 11
Graham Goode Racing	Ford Capri III 3.0S	16	(United Kingdom) Graham Goode	2, 5–7, 9, 11
Charles Sawyer-Hoare	Ford Capri III 3.0S	20	(United Kingdom) Charles Sawyer-Hoare	1–4, 6, 8, 11
Class C
Napolina Alfa Romeo Dealer Team; Napolina Alfa Romeo Dealer Team with Hampshires of Dorking	Alfa Romeo GTV6	25	(United Kingdom) Jon Dooley	1, 3–11
James Burrows	Toyota Celica 2000 LB	26	(United Kingdom) James Burrows	1–4, 6, 8, 10
Mike Buckley	Ford Escort RS2000	27	(United Kingdom) Mike Buckley	1–6
Arne Riis	Triumph Dolomite Sprint	28	(Denmark) Arne Riis	6, 8
Team Electroplsn	Mazda RX-7	30	(United Kingdom) Terry Nightingale	1–4, 11
Team Electroplsn	Mazda RX-7	30	(United Kingdom) Mike Kimpton	6–8
Hamish Irvine	Triumph Dolomite Sprint	32	(United Kingdom) Hamish Irvine	All
Tony Dickinson	Ford Escort RS2000	33	(United Kingdom) Tony Dickinson	3–11
R&C Racing Developments	Mazda RX-7	34	(United Kingdom) Gordon Bruce	1
David Palmer	Mazda RX-7	?	(United Kingdom) David Palmer	4
Team Castrol	Ford Escort RS2000	?	(Denmark) Erik Høyer	8
Class B
Morris Vulcan Ltd. with Triang Toys	Volkswagen Golf GTI	35	(United Kingdom) John Morris	All
TL Racing	Volkswagen Scirocco GTI	36	(United Kingdom) Tony Lanfranchi	All
Robin Brundle	Audi 80 GLE	37	(United Kingdom) Robin Brundle	1–4, 10–11
Robin Brundle	Toyota Celica GT	37	(United Kingdom) Robin Brundle	5–9
Chris Hodgetts	Toyota Corolla GT	39	(United Kingdom) Chris Hodgetts	7–8
Hughes of Beaconsfield/Toyota GB	Toyota Corolla GT	40	(United Kingdom) Win Percy	All
Julian May Racing	Ford Fiesta 1.6	44	(United Kingdom) Jock Robertson	All
John Tait	Toyota Corolla GT	50	(United Kingdom) John Tait	1–4
Race Time Marketing Ltd.	Volkswagen Golf GTI	51	(United Kingdom) Alan Greenhalgh	1, 3–6, 8–11
Napolina Alfa Romeo Dealer Team; Napolina Alfa Romeo Dealer Team with Hampshires of Dorking	Alfa Romeo Alfasud Sprint	52	(United Kingdom) Andrew Thorpe	All
Baileys of Hanley Ltd. Peugeot Talbot	Talbot Sunbeam TI	67	(United Kingdom) Terry Watts	2–3, 7–8
Stanfield and White	Talbot Sunbeam TI	68	(United Kingdom) John Spiller	1, 3–8, 11
Industrial Control Services Ltd.	Toyota Celica GT	?	(United Kingdom) Pete Hall	5–6
Tony Crudgington	Toyota Corolla GT	?	(United Kingdom) Tony Crudgington	9–11
Class A
Royal Mail Datapost Racing with Esso	Austin Metro 1300 HLS	71	(United Kingdom) Alan Curnow	All
Royal Mail Datapost Racing with Esso	Austin Metro 1300 HLS	77	(United Kingdom) Richard Longman	All
Wadham Stringer/Team Castrol	Austin Metro 1300 HLS	72	(United Kingdom) Roger Saunders	All
Linden Racing with Everest Double Glazing	Austin Metro 1300 HLS	73	(United Kingdom) Neil McGrath	All
Team Sanyo Racing with Esso; Hepolite Glacier Racing	Austin Metro 1300 HLS	74	(United Kingdom) Steve Soper	All
Stuart Fowler	Ford Fiesta 1.3	75	(United Kingdom) Stuart Fowler	1–2
Napolina Alfa Romeo Dealer Team; Napolina Alfa Romeo Dealer Team with Hampshires of Dorking	Alfa Romeo Alfasud Ti	81	(United Kingdom) Jon Dooley	2–3
Napolina Alfa Romeo Dealer Team; Napolina Alfa Romeo Dealer Team with Hampshires of Dorking	Alfa Romeo Alfasud Ti	82	(United Kingdom) Rob Kirby	All
GM Dealer Sport	Vauxhall Astra 1.3	99	(United Kingdom) David da Costa	5–6, 8, 10–11
Richard Hurdwell	Austin Metro 1300 HLS	?	(United Kingdom) Richard Hurdwell	9

== Calendar and winners ==
All races were held in the United Kingdom. Overall winners in **bold**.

Round		Circuit	Date	Class D Winner	Class C Winner	Class B Winner	Class A Winner
1		Silverstone Circuit, Northamptonshire	20 March	(United Kingdom) **Jeff Allam**	(United Kingdom) Terry Nightingale	(United Kingdom) Win Percy	(United Kingdom) Richard Longman
2	A	Mallory Park, Leicestershire	28 March	(United Kingdom) **Jeff Allam**	(United Kingdom) Terry Nightingale	Not contested.	
2	B	Mallory Park, Leicestershire	28 March	Not contested.		(United Kingdom) **Win Percy**	(United Kingdom) Jon Dooley
3	A	Oulton Park, Cheshire	9 April	(United Kingdom) **Gordon Spice**	(United Kingdom) Hamish Irvine	Not contested.	
3	B	Oulton Park, Cheshire	9 April	Not contested.		(United Kingdom) **Win Percy**	(United Kingdom) Richard Longman
4		Thruxton Circuit, Hampshire	12 April	(United Kingdom) **Vince Woodman**	(United Kingdom) Jon Dooley	(United Kingdom) Win Percy	(United Kingdom) Steve Soper
5		Thruxton Circuit, Hampshire	31 May	(United Kingdom) **Vince Woodman**	(United Kingdom) Hamish Irvine	(United Kingdom) Win Percy	(United Kingdom) Richard Longman
6		Silverstone Circuit, Northamptonshire	13 June	(United Kingdom) **Jeff Allam**	(United Kingdom) Tony Dickinson	(United Kingdom) Win Percy	(United Kingdom) Richard Longman
7		Donington Park, Leicestershire	4 July	(United Kingdom) **Vince Woodman**	(United Kingdom) Tony Dickinson	(United Kingdom) Win Percy	(United Kingdom) Steve Soper
8		Brands Hatch, Kent	18 July	(United Kingdom) **Pete Lovett**	(United Kingdom) Jon Dooley	(United Kingdom) Win Percy	(United Kingdom) Richard Longman
9		Donington Park, Leicestershire	15 August	(United Kingdom) **Jeff Allam**	(United Kingdom) Tony Dickinson	(United Kingdom) Win Percy	(United Kingdom) Steve Soper
10		Brands Hatch, Kent	30 August	(United Kingdom) **Vince Woodman**	(United Kingdom) Hamish Irvine	(United Kingdom) Win Percy	(United Kingdom) Steve Soper
11		Silverstone Circuit, Northamptonshire	3 October	(United Kingdom) **Pete Lovett**	(United Kingdom) Jon Dooley	(United Kingdom) Win Percy	(United Kingdom) Steve Soper

== Championship standings ==
=== Drivers' Championship ===
Points were awarded on a 9, 6, 4, 3, 2, 1 basis to the top six finishers in each class, with one bonus point for the fastest lap in each class. In races where a class had less than four starters, points would be awarded to the top two finishers (6 & 4 respectively) with one point for the fastest lap. A driver's best nine scores counted towards the championship, dropped scores are shown in brackets. Positions are shown as overall/class.

Pos	Driver	Class	SIL	MAL		OUL		THR	THR	SIL	DON	BRA	DON	BRA	SIL	Pts
1	(United Kingdom) Win Percy	B	**7/1**		**1/1**		**1/1**	**7/1**	**8/1**	(**10/1**)	**6/1**	**8/1**	**6/1**	**4/1**	(**9/1**)	90
2	(United Kingdom) Richard Longman	A	**10/1**		(**9/3**)		**4/1**	**13/2**	**?/1**	?/1	**Ret**	?/1	**10/2**	7/2	?/2	72
3	(United Kingdom) Steve Soper	A	?/3		Ret		6/2	12/1	Ret	Ret	10/1	**?/2**	9/1	**6/1**	**14/1**	65
4	(United Kingdom) Jeff Allam	D	**1/1**	**1/1**		(5/5)		**4/4**	Ret	**1/1**	2/2	3/3	1/1	3/3	5/5	60
5	(United Kingdom) Vince Woodman	D	3/3	2/2		**6/6**		1/1	**1/1**	2/2	1/1	**4/4**	**Ret**	1/1	7/7	60
6	(United Kingdom) Hamish Irvine	C	(?/3)	8/2		7/1		?/2	?/1	Ret	?/3	**11/2**	8/2	12/1	12/3	59
7	(United Kingdom) John Morris	B	9/2		2/2		2/2	9/2	9/2	?/2	9/3	9/2	Ret	Ret	11/2	52
8	(United Kingdom) Jon Dooley	C	Ret			**8/2**		15/1	?/3	Ret	**?/2**	10/1	Ret	**Ret**	**8/1**	49
9	(United Kingdom) Andy Rouse	D	2/2	4/4		3/3		3/3	2/2	3/3	3/3	Ret	2/2	Ret	**3/3**	41
10	(United Kingdom) Tony Dickinson	C				15/5		Ret	**DSQ**	**?/1**	7/1	?/5	**7/1**	?/2	10/2	40
11	(United Kingdom) Gordon Spice	D	5/5	3/3		1/1		2/2	3/3	4/4	Ret	2/2	3/3	**Ret**	?/8	39
12	(United Kingdom) Tony Lanfranchi	B	13/3		3/3		3/3	10/3	10/3	Ret	8/2	Ret	Ret	6/2	13/3	36
13	(United Kingdom) Roger Saunders	A	?/5		7/2		8/3	?/3	?/3	Ret	?/3	?/4	Ret	?/3	?/4	34
14	(United Kingdom) Terry Nightingale	C	**8/1**	**7/1**		9/3		?/3							15/4	32
15	(United Kingdom) Alan Curnow	A	?/2		Ret		Ret	Ret	?/2	**?/2**	?/2	Ret	Ret	?/5	Ret	28
16	(United Kingdom) Pete Lovett	D							7/7	9/9	**4/4**	1/1	5/5	10/4	1/1	27
17	(United Kingdom) Neil McGrath	A	?/4		Ret		Ret	Ret	?/4	?/3	Ret	?/3	12/3	Ret	?/3	23
18	(United Kingdom) Robin Brundle	B	DNS		4/4		5/4	11/4	DNS	?/3	Ret	13/3	DNS	9/4	Ret	20
19	(South Africa) Rad Dougall	D	4/4	Ret		2/2		5/5	4/4	6/6	5/5	6/6				18
20	(Australia) Brian Muir	D								5/5		5/5	Ret	2/2	2/2	17
21	(United Kingdom) Jock Robertson	B	14/4		DNS		10/7	?/?	?/4	DNS	11/4	Ret	Ret	8/3	?/4	16
22	(United Kingdom) Mike Buckley	C	19/2	NC		10/4		Ret	?/2	Ret						15
23	(United Kingdom) Andrew Thorpe	B	?/5		Ret		7/5	14/5	?/5	Ret	DNS	Ret	11/2	?/6	Ret	15
24	(United Kingdom) James Burrows	C	Ret	10/3		DNS		?/4		Ret		?/6		?/3		12
25	(United Kingdom) Jon Dooley	A			6/1		Ret									9
26	(United Kingdom) Mike Kimpton	C								?/2	Ret	?/4				9
27	(United Kingdom) David da Costa	A							?/5	Ret		?/5		?/4	?/5	9
28	(United Kingdom) John Spiller	B	?/6				9/6	?/?	?/6	Ret	?/5	?/4			?/6	9
29	(United Kingdom) Alan Greenhalgh	B	DNS				?/?	?/?	?/?	Ret		DNS	13/3	11/5	Ret	6
30	(United Kingdom) Dennis Leech	D	6/6			4/4		8/7	5/5	8/8	Ret	Ret			Ret	6
31	(United Kingdom) Tony Crudgington	B											15/4	?/?	?/5	5
32	(United Kingdom) Graham Goode	D		6/6					6/6	7/7	Ret		4/4		Ret	5
33	(Denmark) Erik Høyer	C										12/3				4
34	(United Kingdom) Rob Kirby	A	DNS		Ret		DNS	?/4	DNS	Ret	Ret	Ret	Ret	?/6	Ret	4
35	(United Kingdom) Charles Sawyer-Hoare	D	Ret	5/5		12/7		6/6		Ret		7/7			6/6	4
36	(United Kingdom) Jonathan Buncombe	D													4/4	3
37	(United Kingdom) Richard Hurdwell	A											14/4			3
38	(United Kingdom) John Tait	B	?/7		5/5		Ret	?/6								3
39	(United Kingdom) Terry Watts	B			8/6		Ret				?/6	Ret				2
40	(United Kingdom) Frank Sytner	D	Ret	9/7		DNS		Ret								0
41	(United Kingdom) Pete Hall	B							?/?	Ret						0
NC	(United Kingdom) Chris Hodgetts	B									Ret	Ret				0
NC	(United Kingdom) Stuart Fowler	A	Ret		DNS											0
NC	(Denmark) Arne Riis	C								DNS		Ret				0
NC	(United Kingdom) Gordon Bruce	C	Ret													0
NC	(United Kingdom) David Palmer	C						**DSQ**								0
NC	(United Kingdom) Tom Walkinshaw	D						PO								0
Pos	Driver	Class	SIL	MAL		OUL		THR	THR	SIL	DON	BRA	DON	BRA	SIL	Pts

Colour	Result
Gold	Winner
Silver	Second place
Bronze	Third place
Green	Points classification
Blue	Non-points classification
Blue	Non-classified finish (NC)
Purple	Retired, not classified (Ret)
Red	Did not qualify (DNQ)
Red	Did not pre-qualify (DNPQ)
Black	Disqualified (DSQ)
White	Did not start (DNS)
White	Withdrew (WD)
White	Race cancelled (C)
Blank	Did not practice (DNP)
Blank	Did not arrive (DNA)
Blank	Excluded (EX)

**Bold** - Pole in class
Italics - Fastest lap in class
