= Toyota Corolla (E70) =

Fourth generation of Toyota Corolla

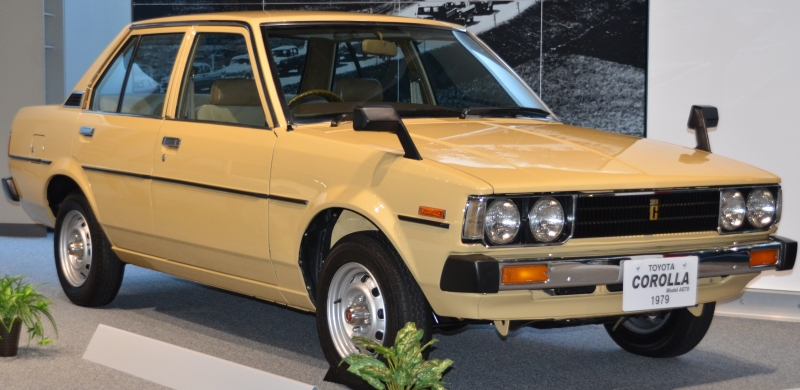
- 1979–1980 Corolla GL sedan (AE70; Japan)

Overview
- Manufacturer: Toyota
- Model code: E70
- Also called: Daihatsu Charmant; Toyota Sprinter; Toyota T-18
- Production: March 1979 – May 1983; August 1979 – June 1987 (wagon/van)
- Assembly: Japan: Toyota City (Takaoka plant); Australia: Port Melbourne, Victoria (Australian Motor Industries); Indonesia: North Jakarta (Toyota Astra Motor); Malaysia: Shah Alam (UMW Toyota Motor); New Zealand: Thames (Toyota New Zealand); Philippines: Parañaque (Delta Motors Corporation); Thailand: Samut Prakan (Toyota Motor Thailand)
- Designer: Fumio Agetsuma (1975)

Body and chassis
- Body style: 2-door sedan; 4-door sedan; 2-door hardtop coupé; 3-door liftback; 3/5-door station wagon; 3/5-door van
- Layout: FR layout

Powertrain
- Engine: 1290 cc 4K I4; 1452 cc 3A I4; 1496 cc 5K-J I4; 1588 cc 2T I4; 1588 cc 12T I4; 1587 cc 4A I4; 1770 cc 3T I4; 1770 cc 13T I4; 1839 cc 1C I4 (diesel)
- Transmission: 4-speed manual K40/T40; 5-speed manual K50/T50; 3-speed automatic A30/A40

Dimensions
- Wheelbase: 2,400 mm (94.5 in)
- Length: 4,050–4,240 mm (159.4–166.9 in)
- Width: 1,610–1,625 mm (63.4–64.0 in)
- Height: 1,325–1,390 mm (52.2–54.7 in)
- Curb weight: 790–975 kg (1,742–2,150 lb)

Chronology
- Predecessor: Corolla E30
- Successor: Corolla E80; Corolla E90 (wagon/van)

The Corolla E70 was the fourth generation of cars sold by Toyota under the Corolla nameplate.

The fourth-generation model was released in March 1979 in Japan, and was the last generation to have the entire lineup in rear-wheel-drive configuration. Export sales commenced in August 1979. Although most of the fourth generation was replaced by 1984, the station wagon and van versions were offered into late 1987. In 1980 Corolla daily production reached an all-time high, averaging 2,346 units. The one-millionth Corolla was a 70-series, built in February 1983. A limited "One Million Edition" was released in Japan at this time.

== Development ==
This generation (apart from the wagon) got a new rear coil spring five-link rear end with a panhard rod, and the wheelbase was longer at 2,400 mm (94.5 in). A new 1.8 L (1,770 cc; 108 cu in) 3T engine was optional to some markets, while parts of the world retained the old 4K. The most notable inline-four engine advancement came in 1979 and 1983, however, as Toyota began offering the 1.5 L (1,452 cc; 89 cu in) 3A-U and 1.6 L (1,587 cc; 97 cu in) 4A-C engines respectively. The aluminium head, SOHC engines, although bulkier in size and weight than the K and T engines it was offered alongside, was a grand step up in performance. This would be the last generation of Corollas to use any pushrod or alloy cylinder head engines, as Toyota made the decision to focus exclusively on aluminium head, OHC engine design from this point forward. This was the first generation to have power steering. In the US market, this was introduced in 1981 for the 1982 model year.

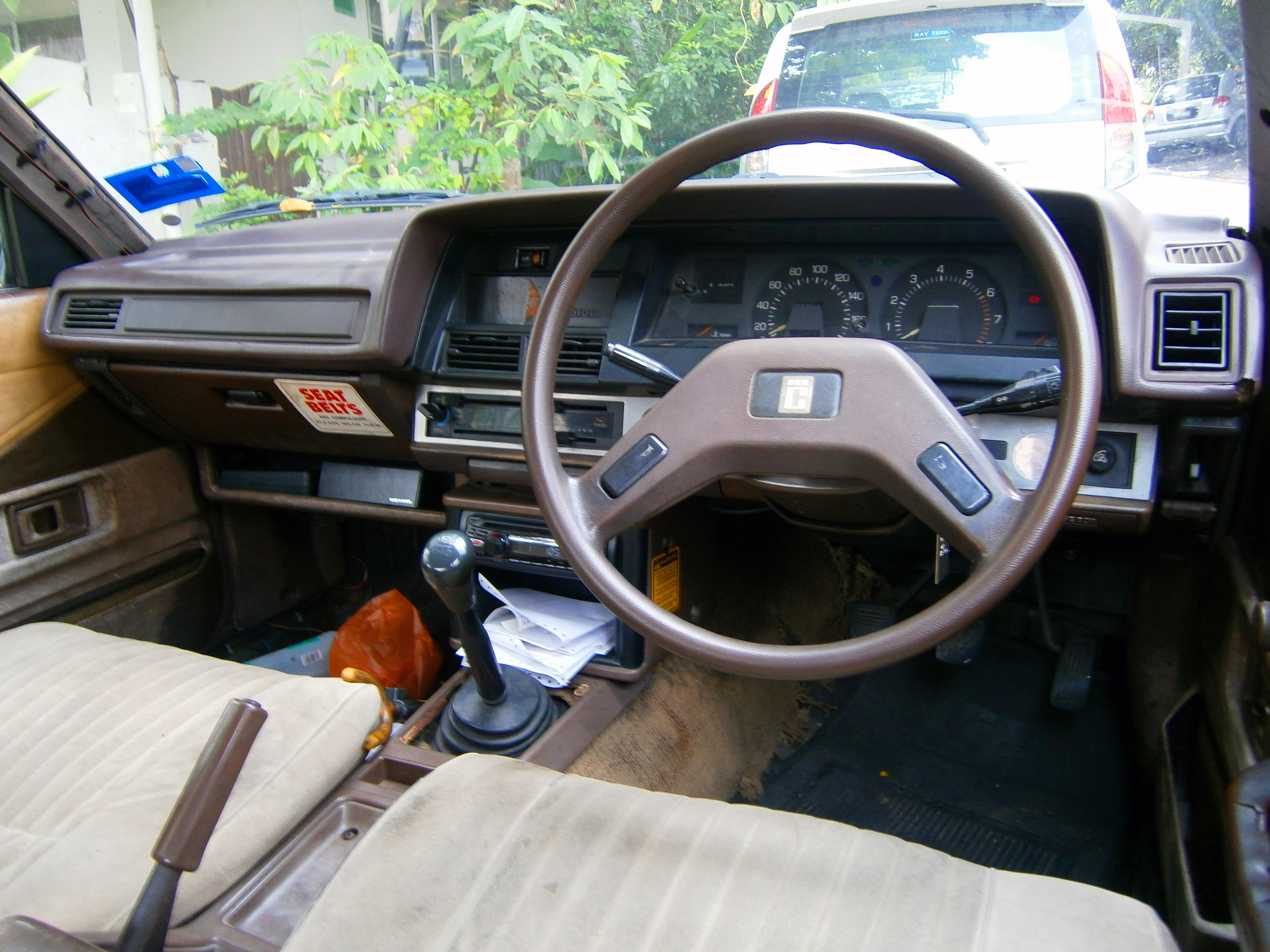
Interior

Various facelifts were made during production. In 1979–1980, a four-round headlamp setup was used in most markets. A restyle for 1981 involved two rectangular headlamps. A more extensive facelift was given for 1982, involving a new sloping nose with wraparound headlights, remodeled taillights and new bumpers, which on some models were rubber moulded. From August 1983 (subsequent to the changeover to front-wheel drive for the rest of the range) the Corolla Van received a new 1.5-litre 5K-J engine as well as a light restyling, and also a roof raised by 45 mm (1.8 in). The Wagon/Van underwent a final light facelift in August 1985, including an upgraded 1C-II engine for the diesels. It also received seats that could be folded nearly flat to make the car beddable, and continued in production until being replaced by the 90-series Corolla Van/Wagon in August 1987.

== Design ==
Design work was started in 1974 by Fumio Agetsuma. The goals he told his team were:

- Quiet cars will have a definite edge. Conservation of both resources and fuel will be very important. Economy and value will also carry considerable weight.
- Our new Corolla must be as aerodynamically perfect as the parameters allow. It must be comfortable, with enough interior room to move about in. It will need all the modern features that future customers will want as well.
- Corolla must change. But we should never destroy the popular base upon which Corolla sales are built. Our new car must reflect the wishes of the consumer, the ordinary people who drive Corollas.
- There should be no generation gap with Corolla. It should appeal to young and old alike. Corolla must also transcend national boundaries. It must perform as well in sub-zero temperatures as it does in the tropics or in the heat of the deserts of the world. Above all, Corolla must be a car that pleases.
- Corolla has an illustrious tradition. Now, let us build our new Corolla on that tradition, the kind of new Corolla we know the drivers of the world will expect.

== Japan ==
In Japan, where it was introduced in March 1979, the Corolla was offered in all body styles: two-door Sedan, four-door Sedan, two-door Hardtop Coupé, three-door Coupé, and three-door Liftback Coupé. The three- or five-door Van models were added to the lineup in August 1979; until then the old 30-series Van had continued to be available. This was also when the 1.8-litre 13T engine first became available in the domestic Japanese market. The Levin continued as a coupé, with the equivalent specification four-door sedan and two-door hardtop called the Corolla GT.

February 1982 saw the introduction of the Toyota 1C diesel engine installed in the Corolla sedan. This car was exclusive to the Toyota Diesel Store to encourage sales at the largely commercial truck retailer for Toyota in Japan, alongside the larger, diesel-engined Toyota Vista. Three months later, the van was no longer available with the 1.6-litre petrol engine, but the five-door KE73G wagon was introduced as the first Corolla Wagon to be sold in Japan (rather than the "van" commercial car). In May 1983, the roof of the van/wagon was raised to 45 mm, this model was exported elsewhere. The van/wagon received another minor update in August 1985 and continued to be offered until August 1987, skipping the first front-wheel-drive generation of Corollas. After the introduction of the front-wheel drive E80-series Corolla, the Van range received a facelift and a new set of chassis codes (KE72V, KE74V, CE71V).

Japanese market engines:

- 4K-U — 1.3 L (1290 cc) I4, 8-valve pushrod, carb, 74 PS (54 kW) (KE70, KE73G)
- 4K-J — 1.3 L (1290 cc) I4, 8-valve pushrod, carb, 69 PS (51 kW) (KE71V, KE72V, van only) 72 PS (53 kW) in later models
- 5K-J — 1.5 L (1496 cc) I4, 8-valve pushrod, carb, (KE74V, van only)
- 3A-U — 1.5 L (1,452 cc) I4, 8-valve SOHC, carb, 80 PS (59 kW) (AE70)
- 12T-J — 1.6 L (1588 cc) I4, 8-valve pushrod, carb, 86 PS (63 kW) (TE73V, TE74V from August 1981)
- 2T-GEU — 1.6 L (1588 cc) I4, 8-valve DOHC, EFI, 115 PS (85 kW) (TE71)
- 13T-U — 1.8 L (1,770 cc) I4, 8-valve pushrod, 95 PS (70 kW) (TE70)
- 3T-U — 1.8 L (1,770 cc) I4, 8-valve pushrod (TE72)
- 1C – 1.8 L I4 diesel, 65 PS (48 kW) (CE70, CE71V)
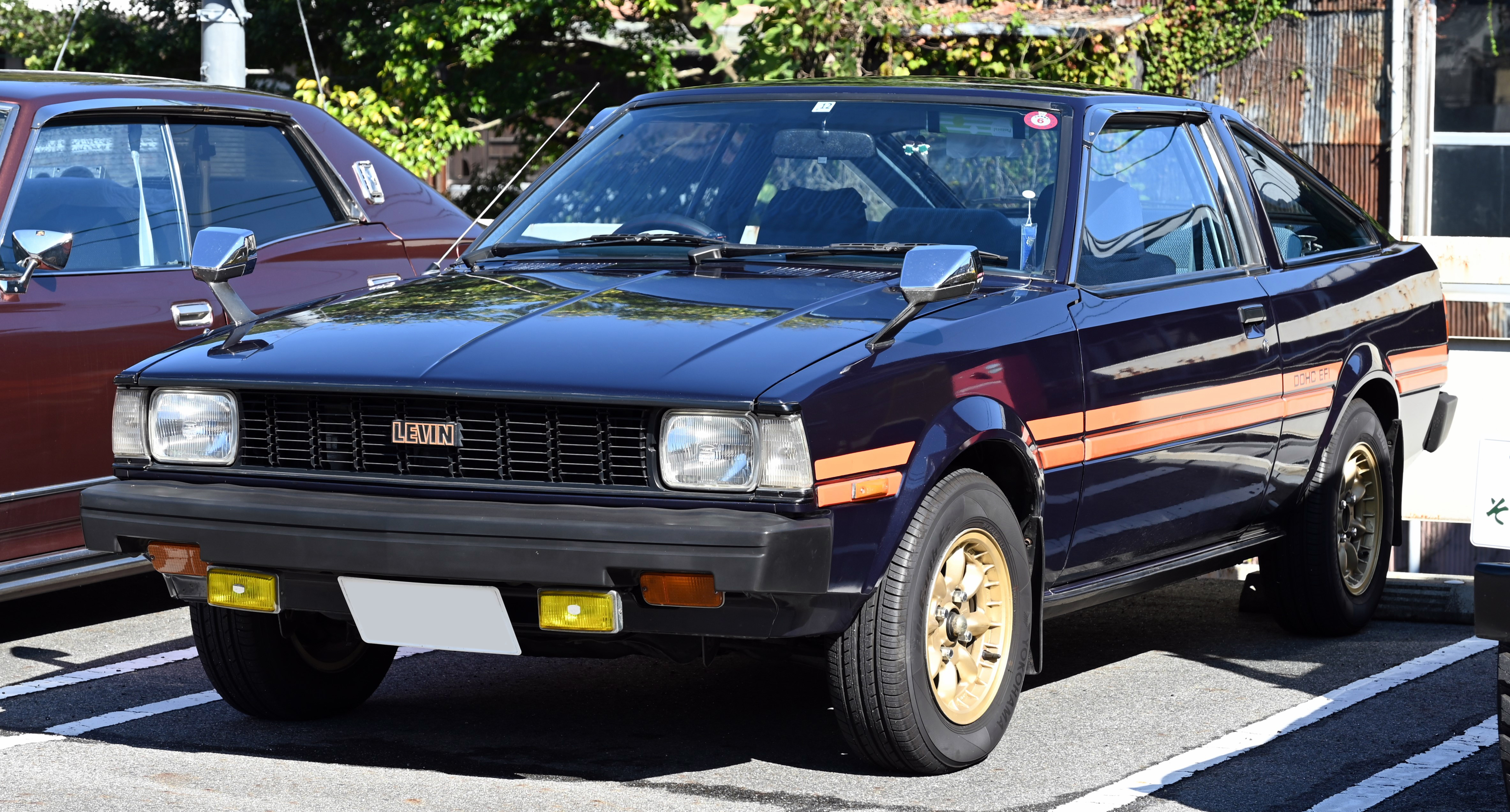
1979–1981 Corolla Levin 3-door liftback coupé (TE71)

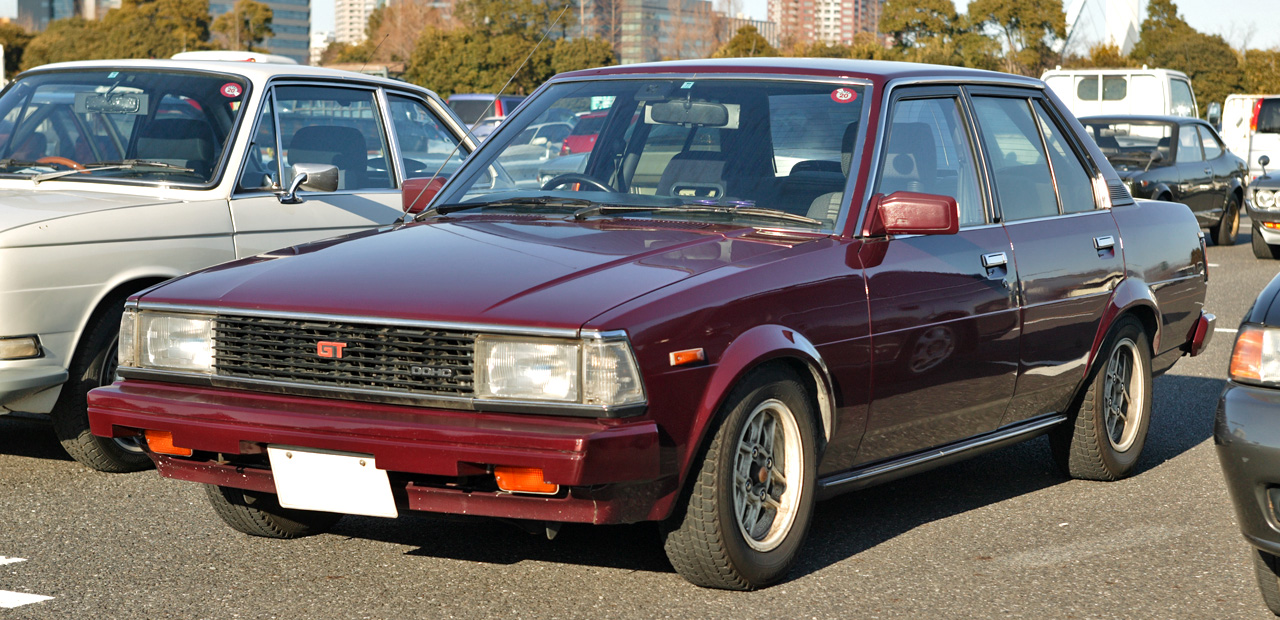
1981–1983 Corolla GT sedan (TE71)

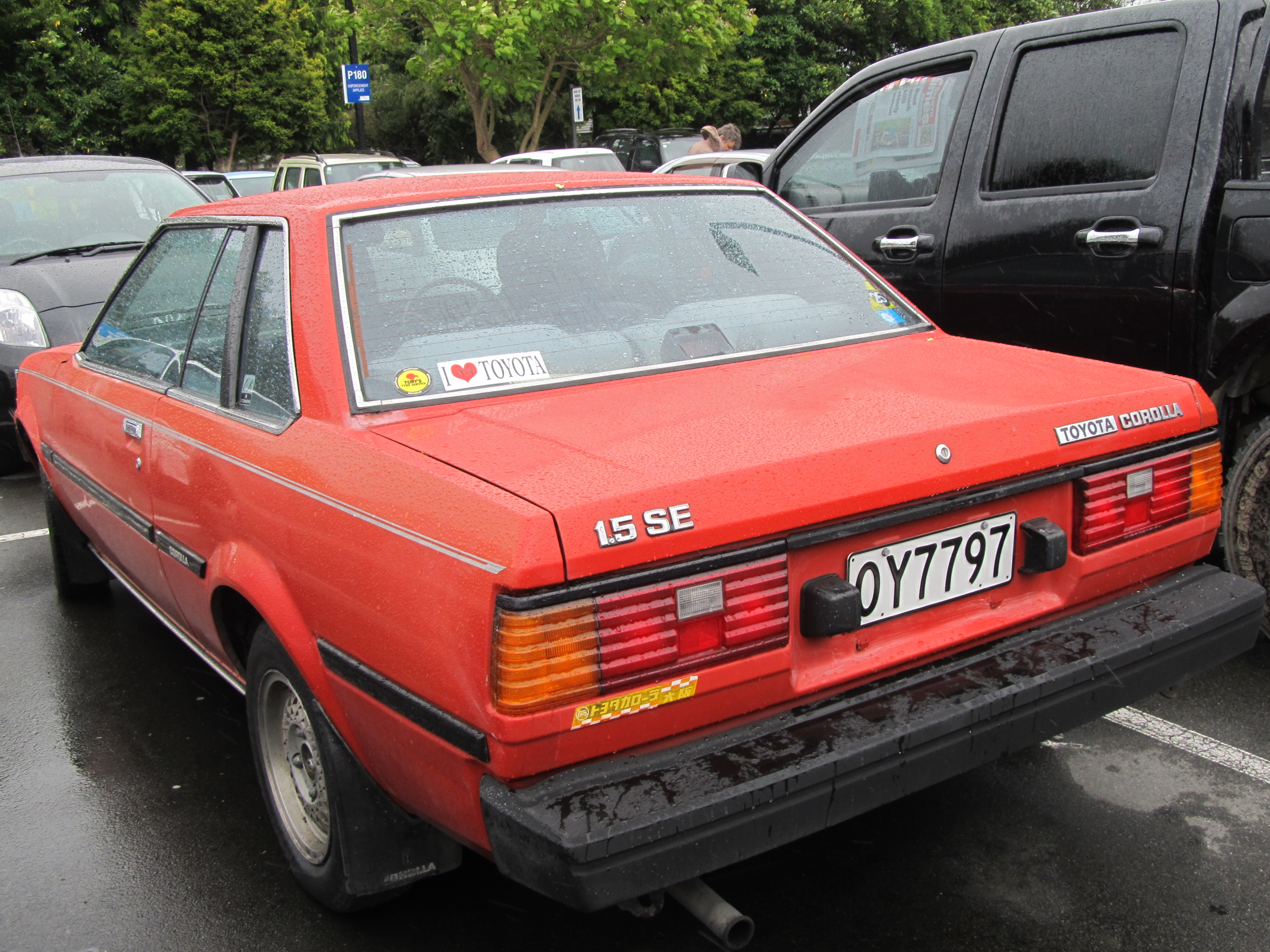
1981–1983 Corolla SE hardtop coupé (AE70)

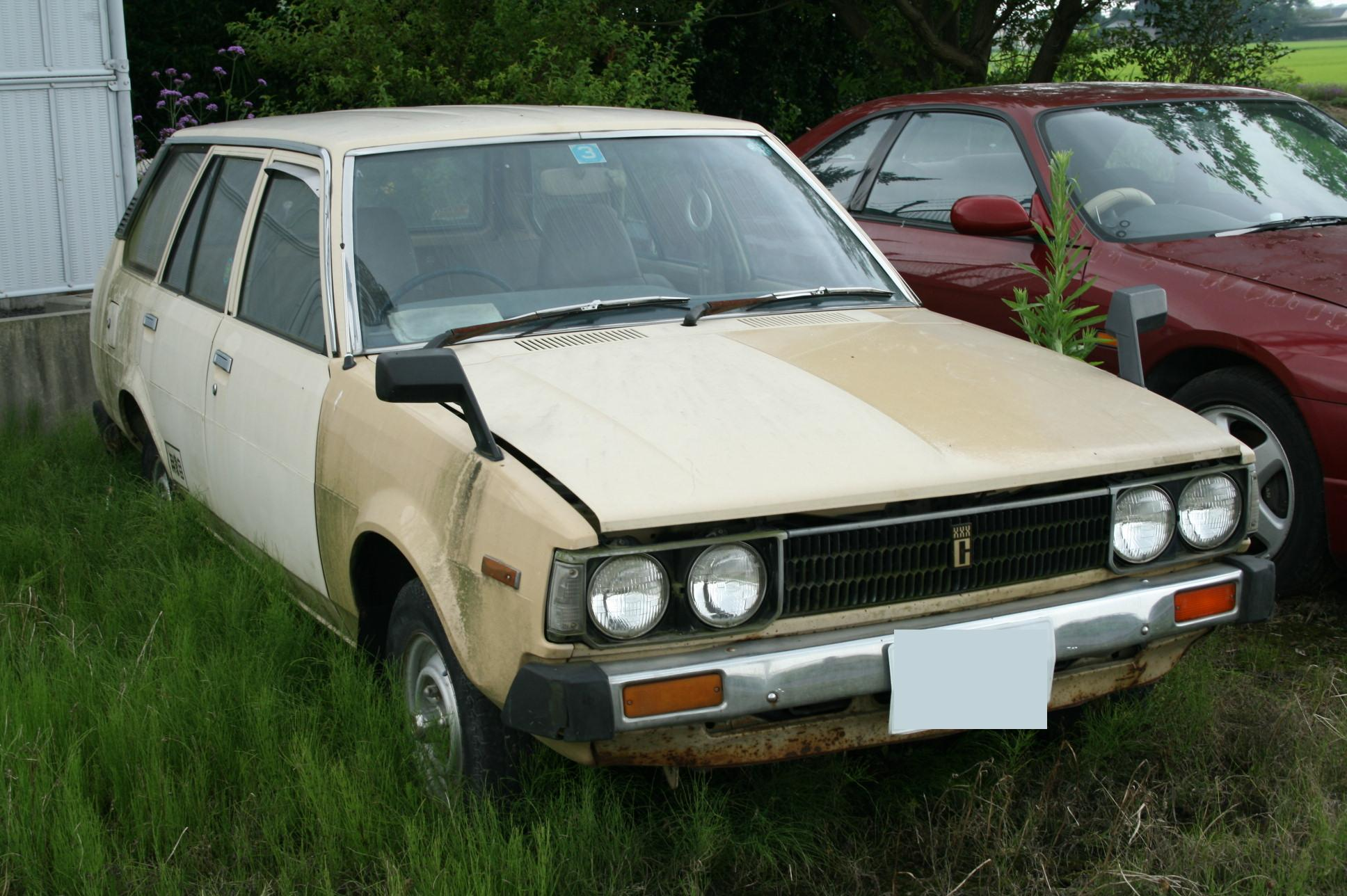
1979–1982 Corolla van (KE71V)

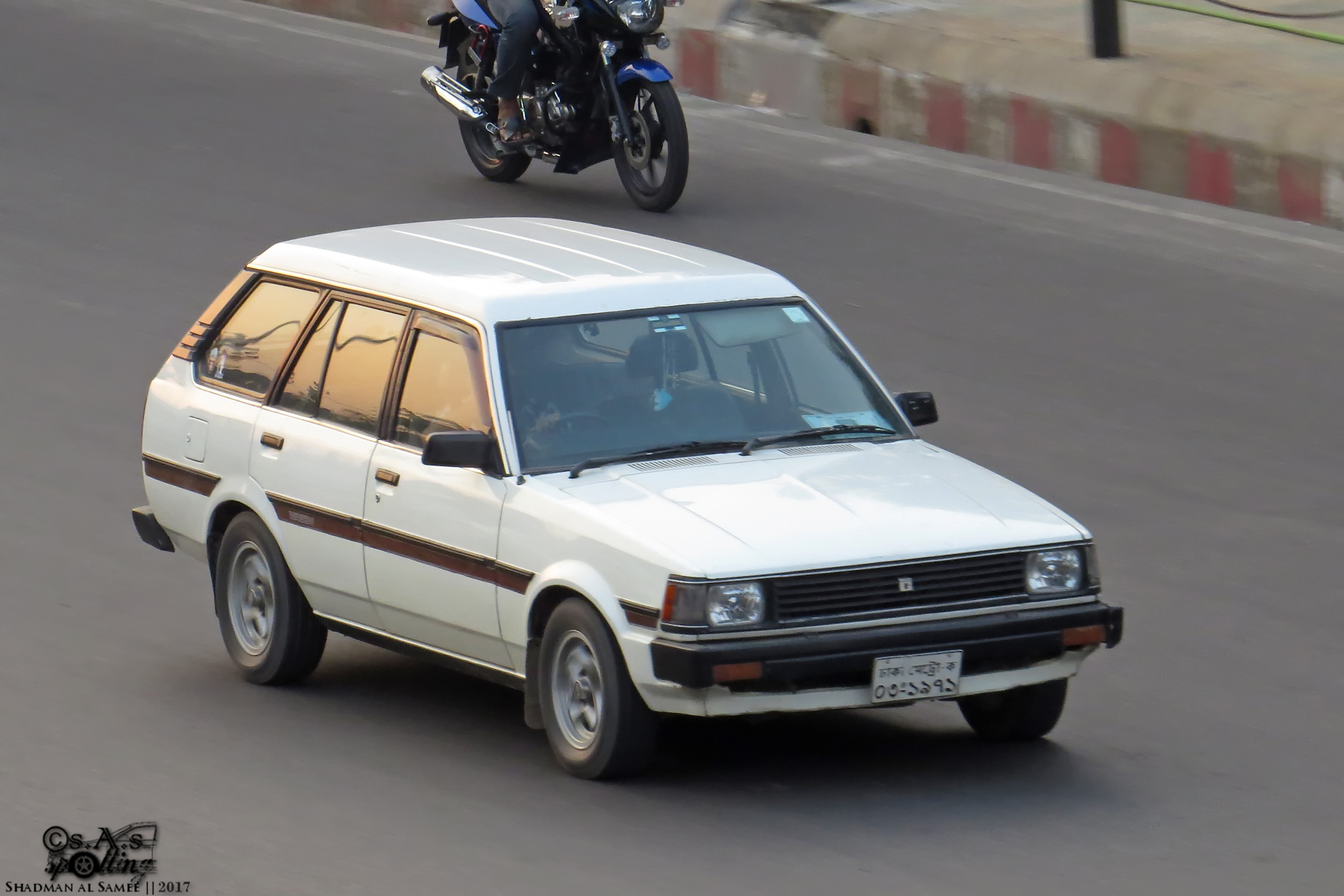
1983–1985 Corolla GL "high roof" wagon (KE73G)

== North America ==
The E70-series Corolla Hardtop and Liftback models were among the last true pillarless hardtops available in the United States. These models used the same 13-inch styled steel wheels and trim rings that graced the U.S-market 1974–75 Celica GT.

North American market engines:

- 3T-C — 1.8 L (1,770 cc) I4, 8-valve Pushrod, carb, 75 hp (56 kW)
- 4A-C — 1.6 L (1,587 cc) I4, 8-valve SOHC, carb, 90 hp (67 kW)

North American market VDS:

- E71 — Sedan, 2-door/4-door (Std, DX)
- E71 — Wagon, 5-door (Std, DX)
- E71 — Hardtop, 2-door (SR5)
- E71 — Coupé, 2-door (SR5)
- E71 — Liftback, 3-door (Std, SR5)
- E72 — Sedan, 5-door (Std, DX)
- E72 — Wagon (Std, DLX)
- E72 — Coupé 2-door (Std, SR5)
- E72 — Liftback, 3-door (Std, SR5)
- E72 — Hardtop, 2-door (Std, SR5)
- E75 — Hardtop, 2-door (SR5)
- E75 — Coupé, 2-door (SR5)
- E75 — Liftback, 3-door (Std, SR5)
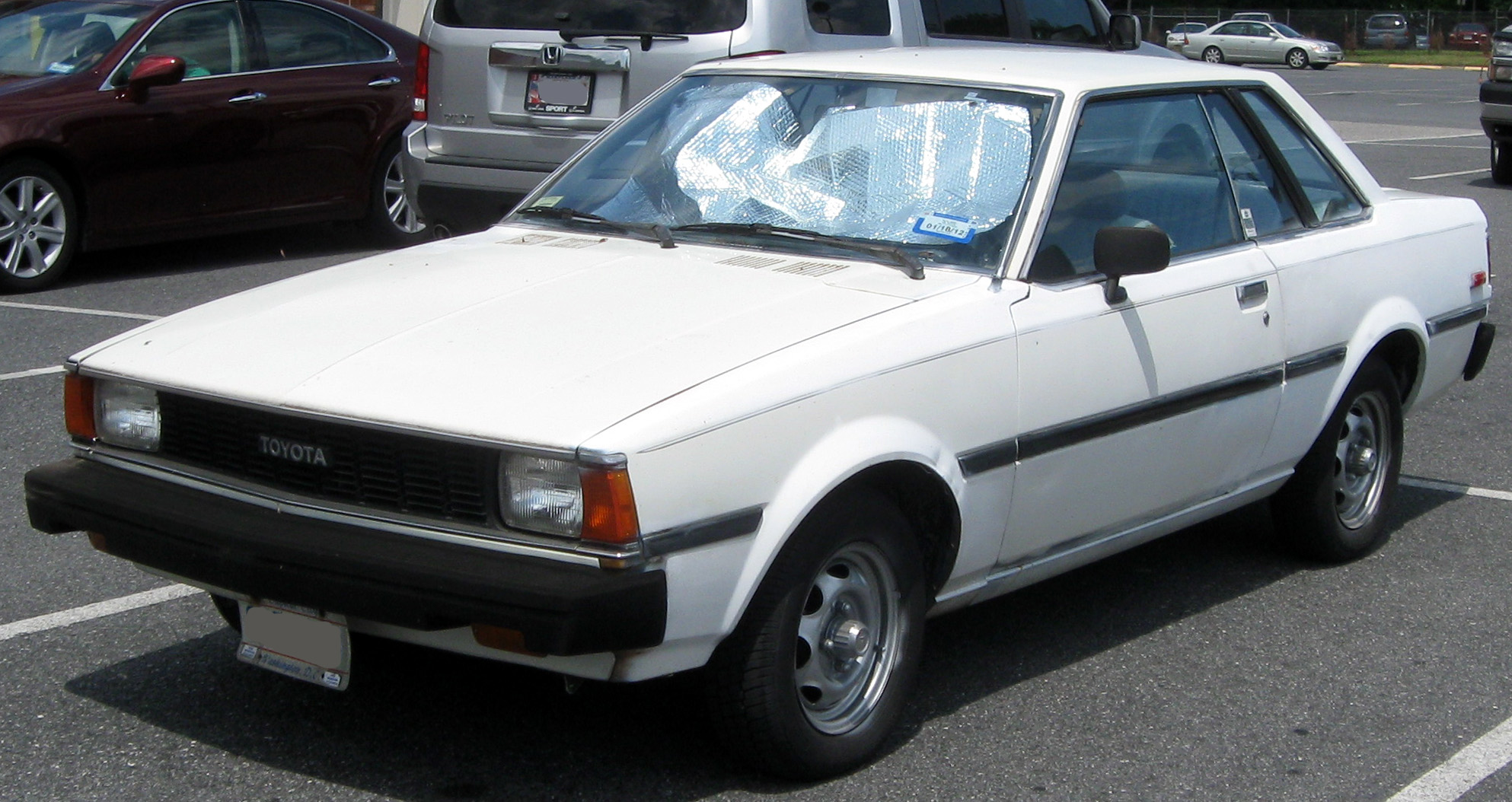
1980–1982 Corolla hardtop coupé (TE72; USA)

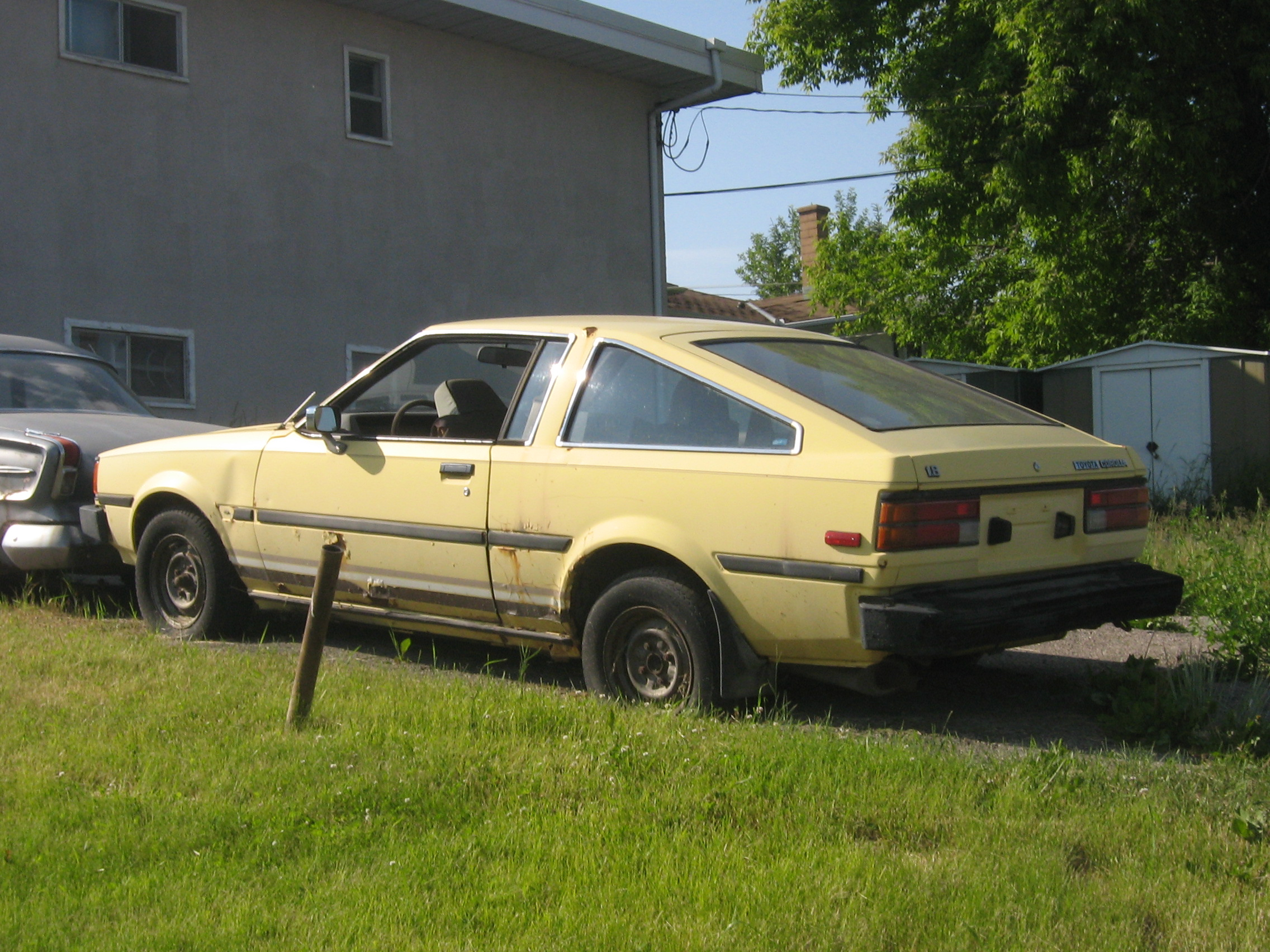
1980–1982 Corolla SR5 liftback coupé (TE72; Canada)

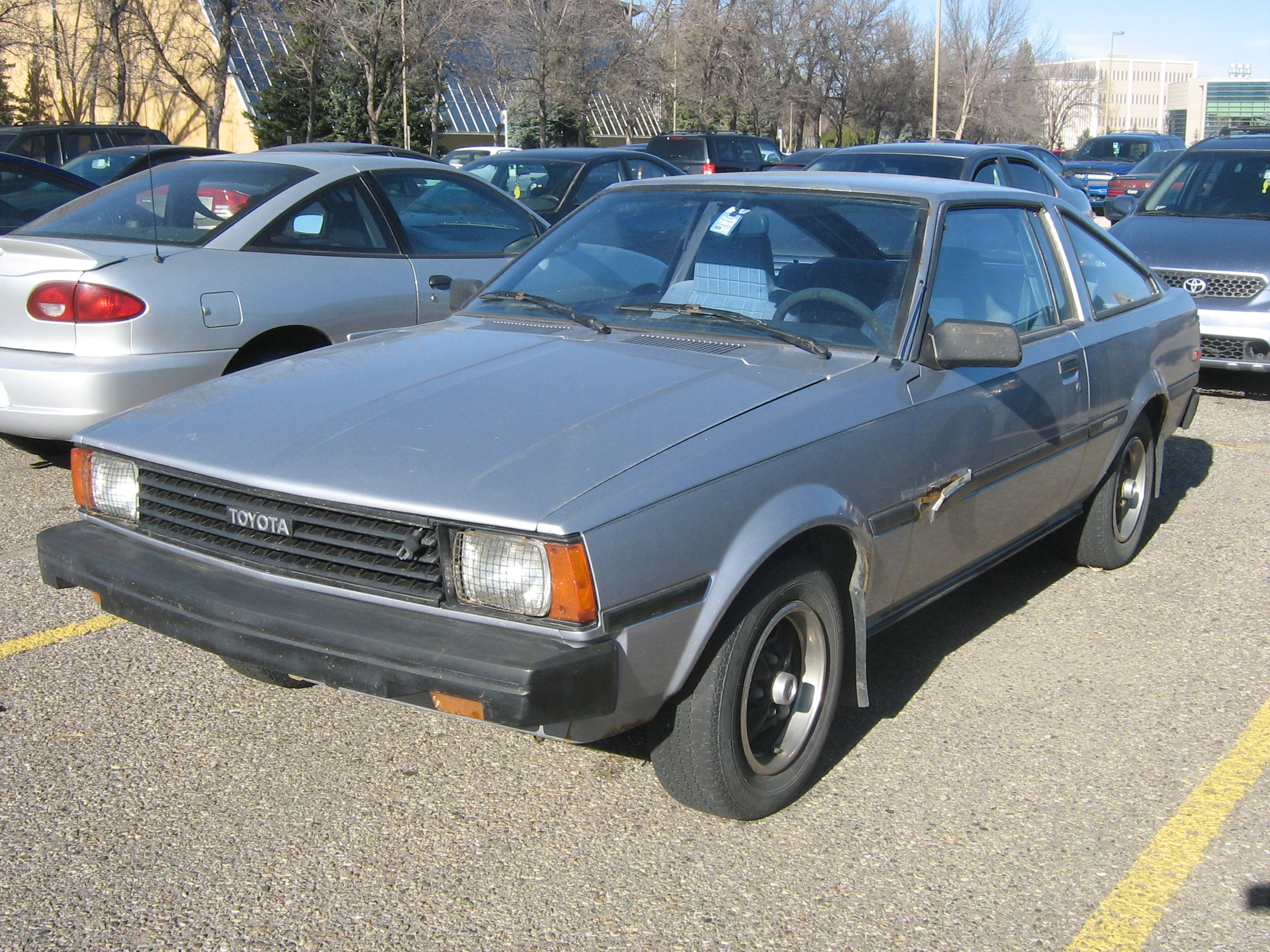
1982–1984 Corolla SR5 liftback coupé (AE71; Canada)

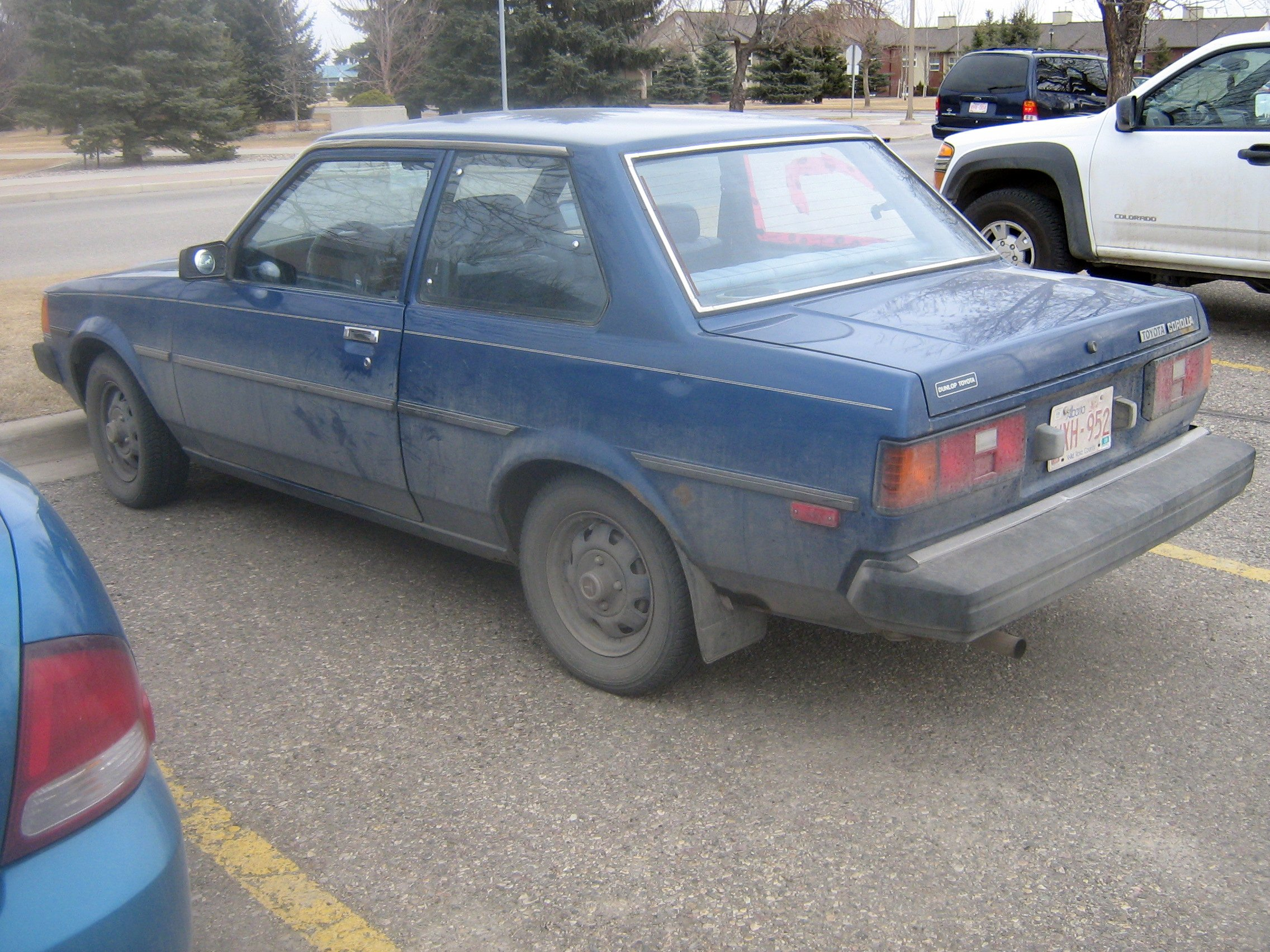
1982–1984 Corolla 2-door sedan (AE71; Canada)

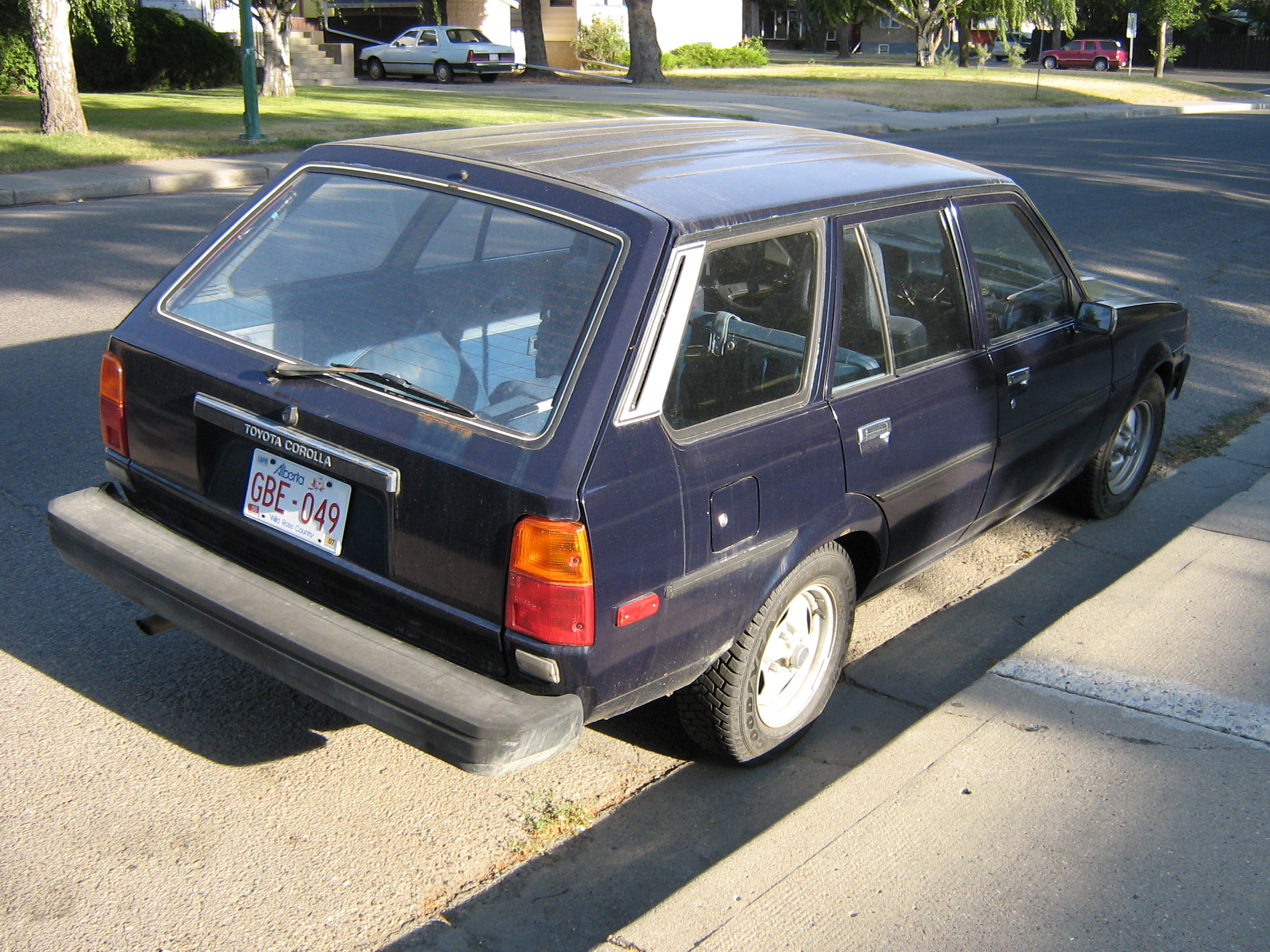
1980–1984 Corolla wagon (TE72; Canada)

== Australia ==
The TE72 Liftback was marketed in Australia as the Toyota T-18 as it was originally sold alongside the previous 30-series Corolla range. Introduced in October 1979, it was fitted with a 1.8-litre engine and a five-speed transmission and was available in either standard or DeLuxe trim.

70 series sedan, wagon and panel van variants were introduced in October 1981 with a 1.3-litre engine. Facelifted models were offered from October 1983, with a 1.6-litre engine now available as an option. A special edition sedan called the "Corolla Spirit" arrived in early 1984; it received a boot spoiler, the 1.6-litre engine, chromed wheel trim, stripes, and some additional equipment.

Australian market engines:

- 4K-C — 1.3 L (1290 cc) I4, 8-valve Pushrod, carb, 48 kW (65 hp) (KE70)
- 4A-C — 1.6 L (1587 cc) I4, 8-valve SOHC, carb, 58 kW (78 hp) (AE71)
- 3T-C — 1.8 L (1770 cc) I4, 8-valve Pushrod, carb, 56 kW (75 hp) (TE72, sold as the "Toyota T-18")
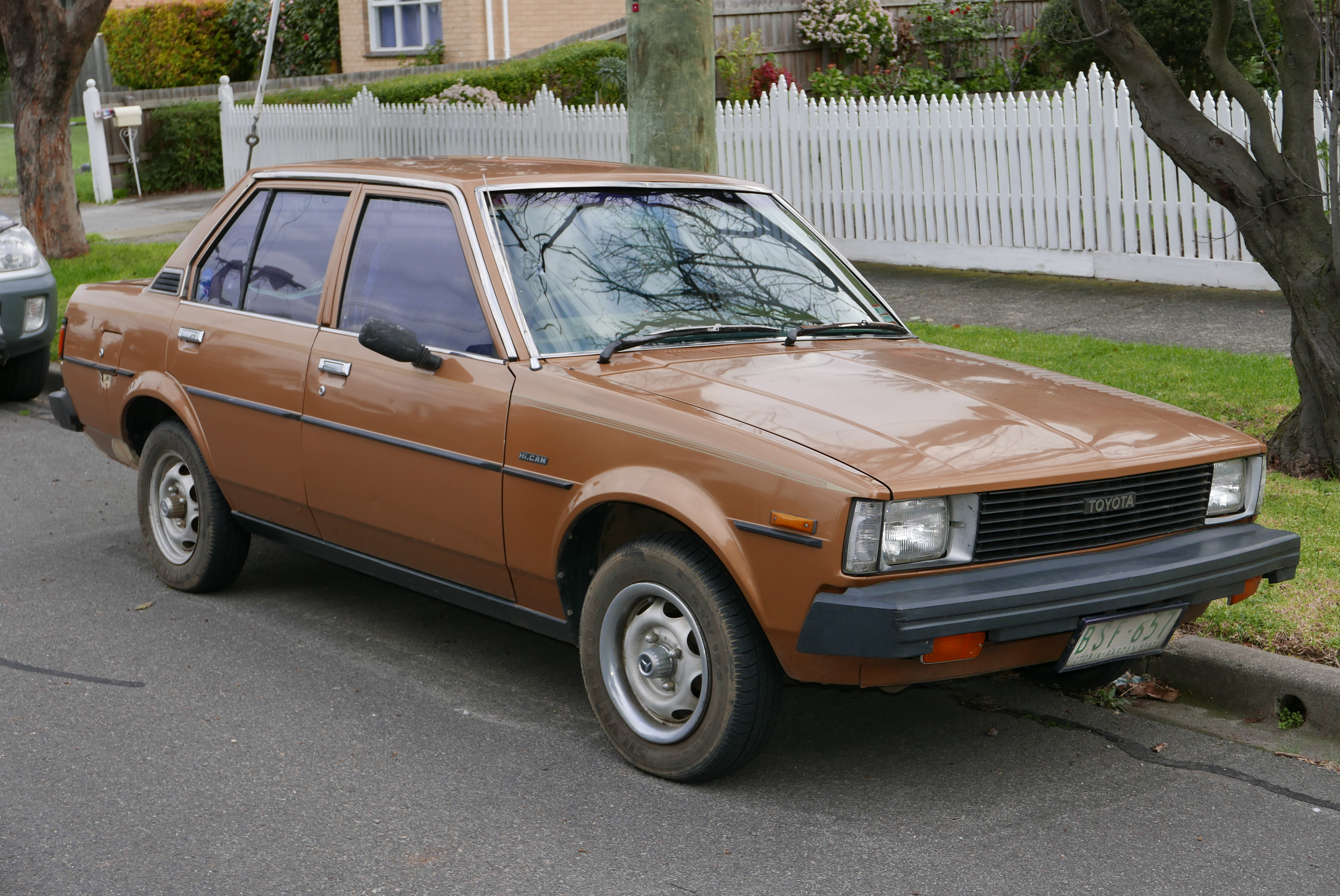
1981–1983 Corolla CS sedan (KE70)

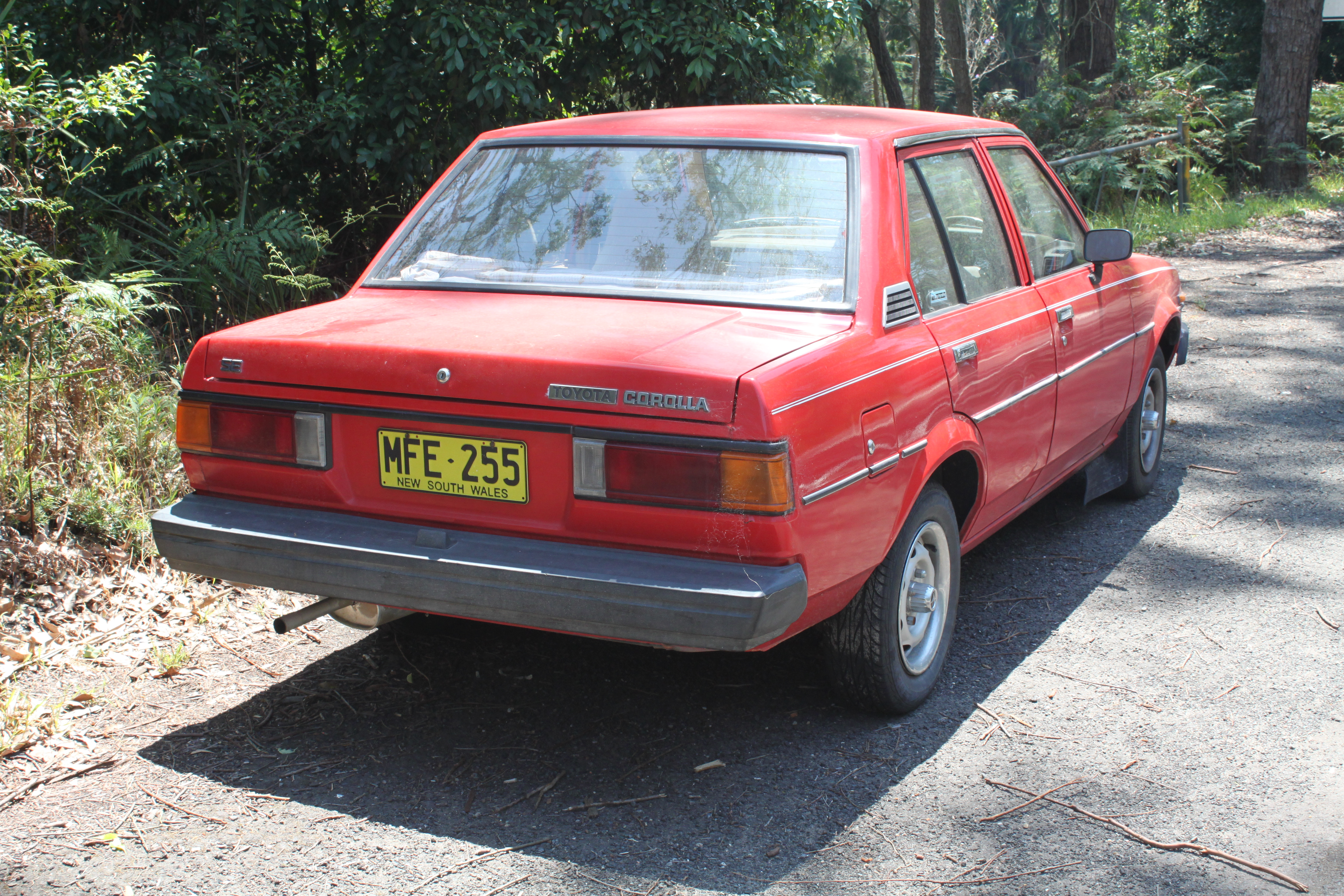
1981–1984 Corolla SE sedan (KE70)

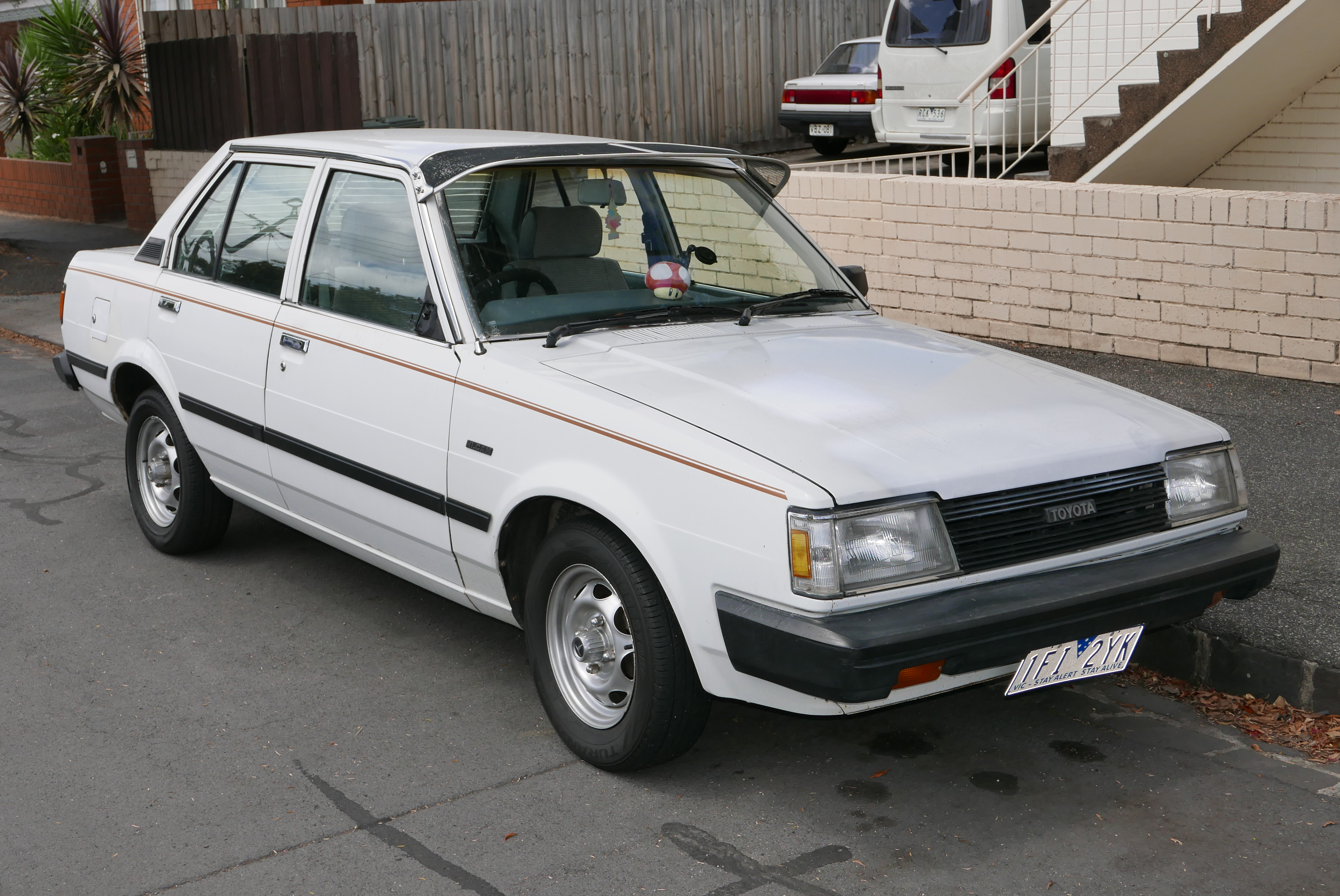
1983–1984 Corolla CS sedan (KE70)

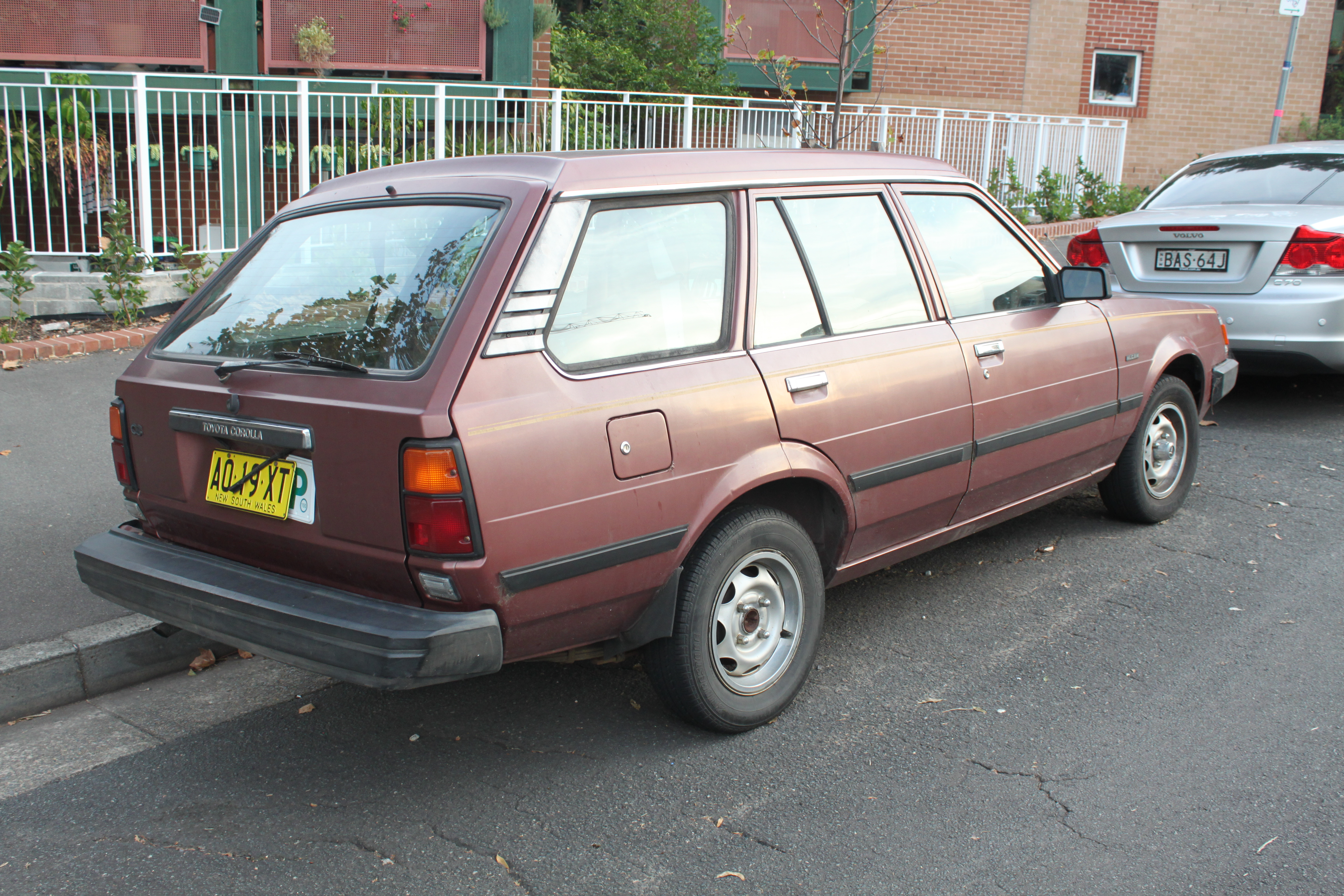
1981–1984 Corolla CS wagon (KE70)

== Europe ==
Most E70-series Corollas sold in Europe were fitted with the 1.3-litre 4K engine, producing 60 PS (44 kW). All European market cars were rated according to DIN. There was also the 1.6-litre 2T engine with 75 PS (55 kW), which was also available in the wagon in some markets, as well as a twin-carburetted version of the same (the 2T-B) for the coupés and liftbacks. The 2T-B has 86 PS (63 kW). The twin-cam 2T-G was also listed in Europe (only with coupé/liftback bodywork), with 108 PS (79 kW) at 6,200 rpm. The European twin-cam has twin carburettors rather than the fuel injection found in domestic Japanese cars. Due to their peculiar emissions regulations, the most powerful engine available to a Swiss and Swedish Liftback buyer was the 1,770 cc 3T unit, producing 80 PS (59 kW) in 1983. The 1982 Swedish models produce 58 or 78 PS (43 or 57 kW) for the 4K or 3T engines.

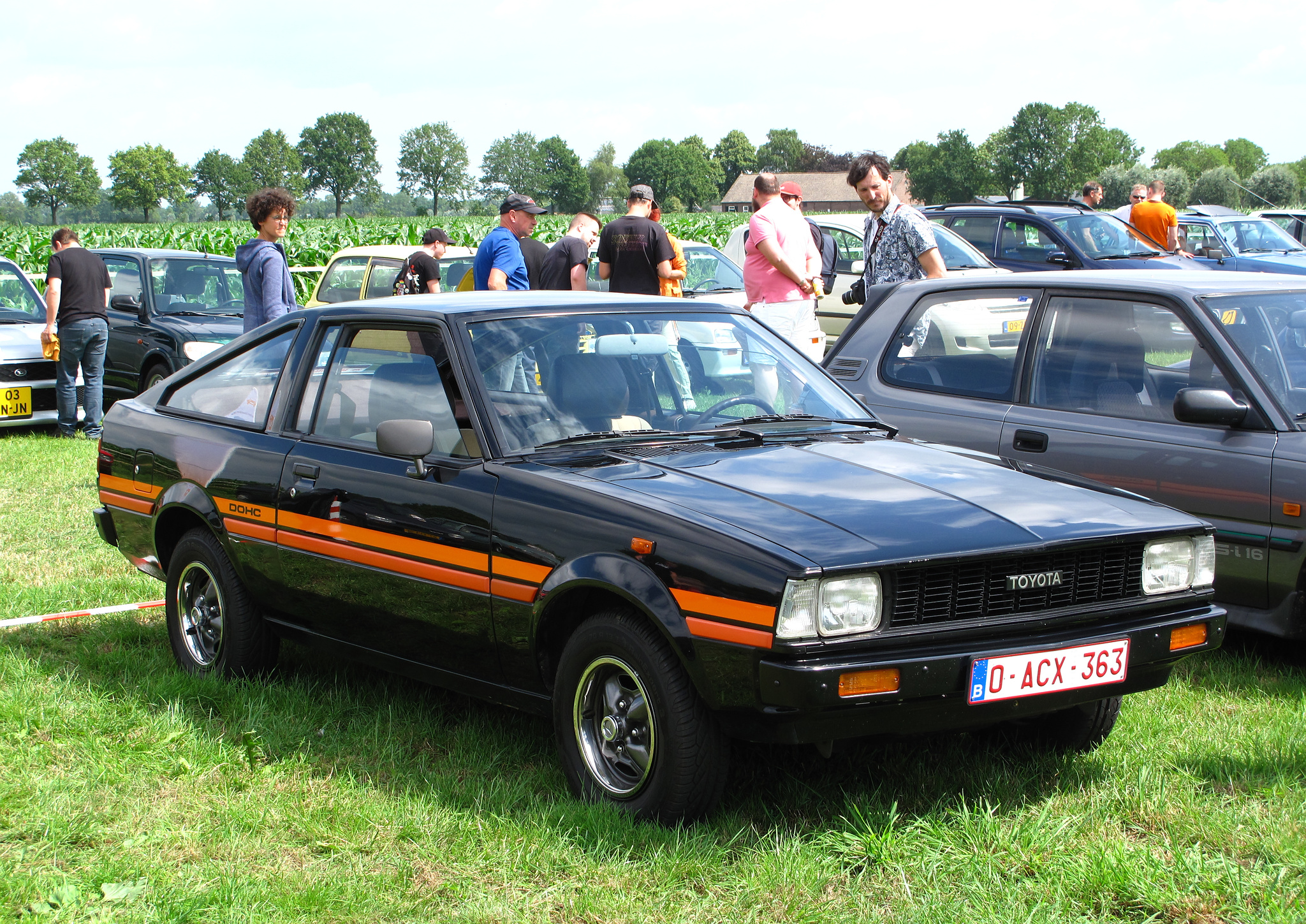
1979–1981 Corolla GT liftback coupé (TE71; Belgium)

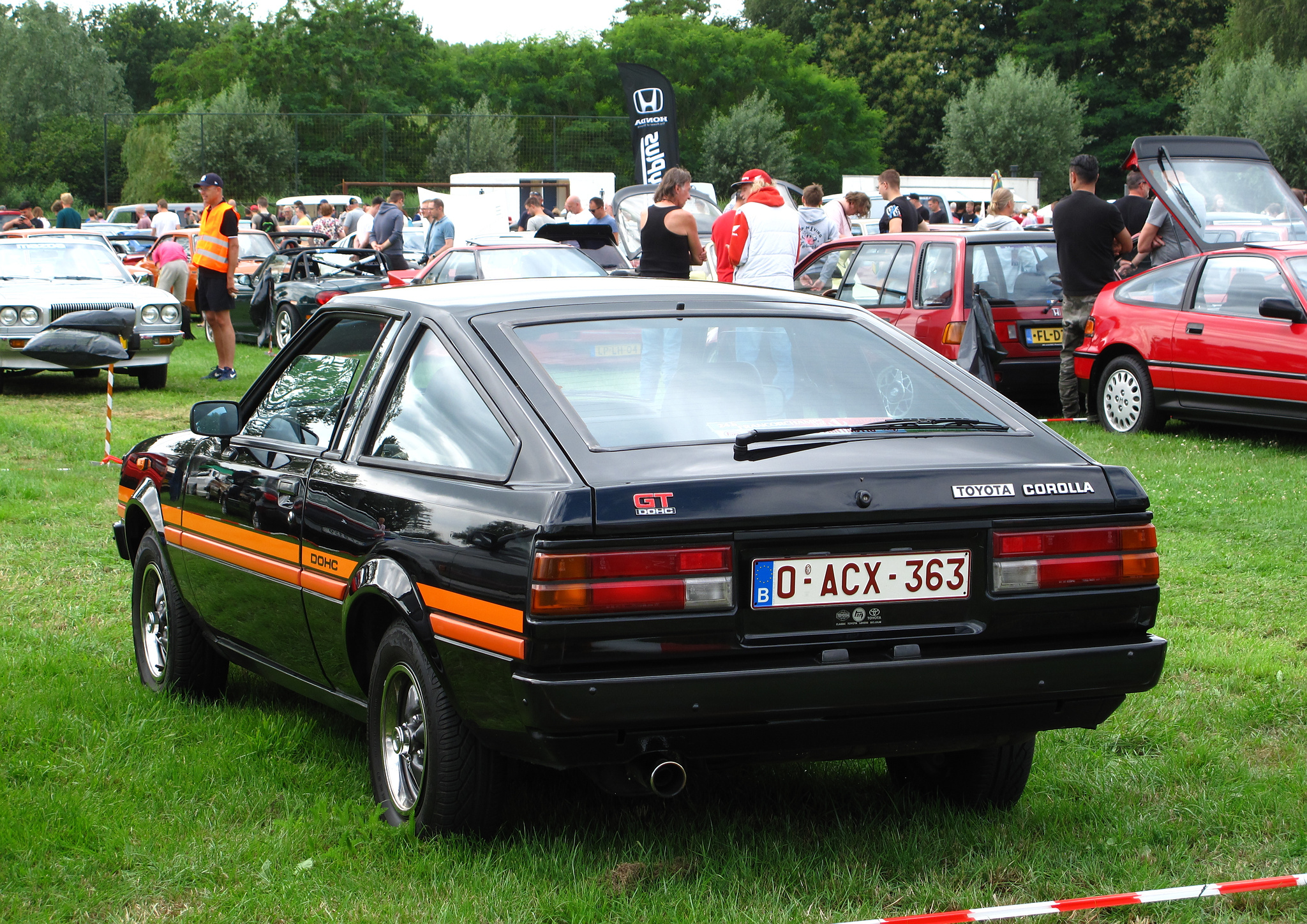
1979–1981 Corolla GT liftback coupé (TE71; Belgium)

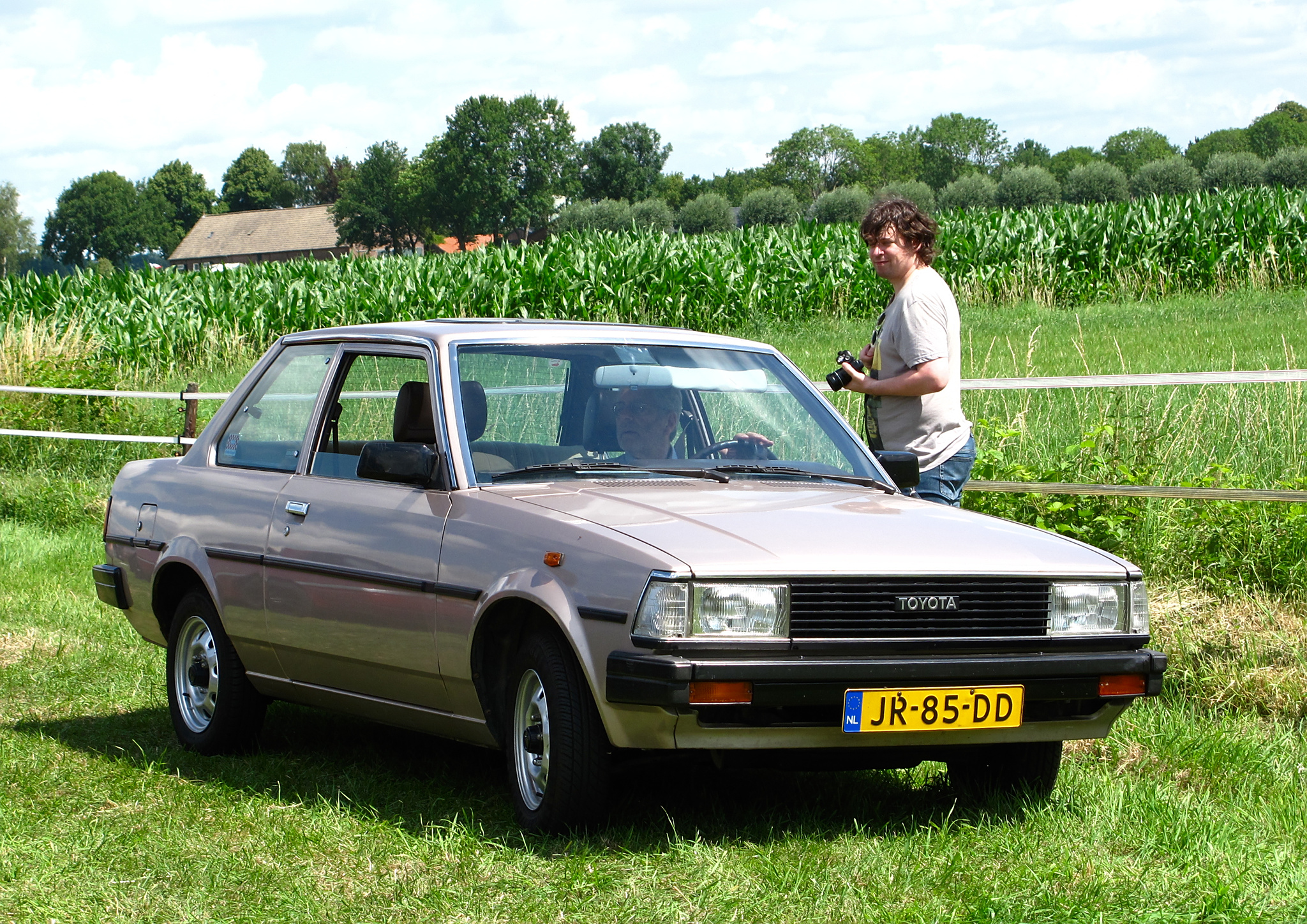
1981–1983 Corolla DX sedan (KE70, Netherlands)

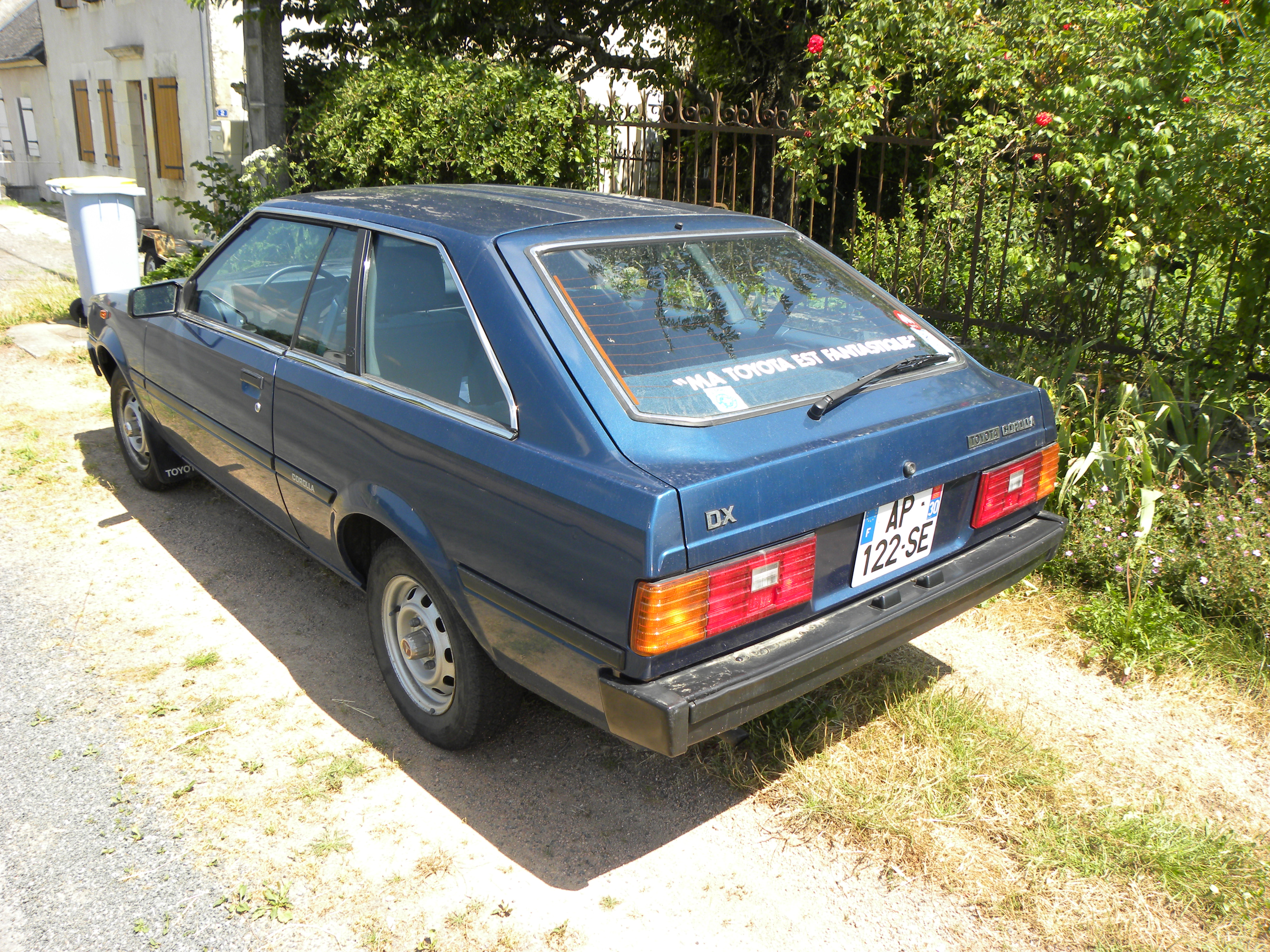
1981–1983 Corolla DX liftback (TE71; France)

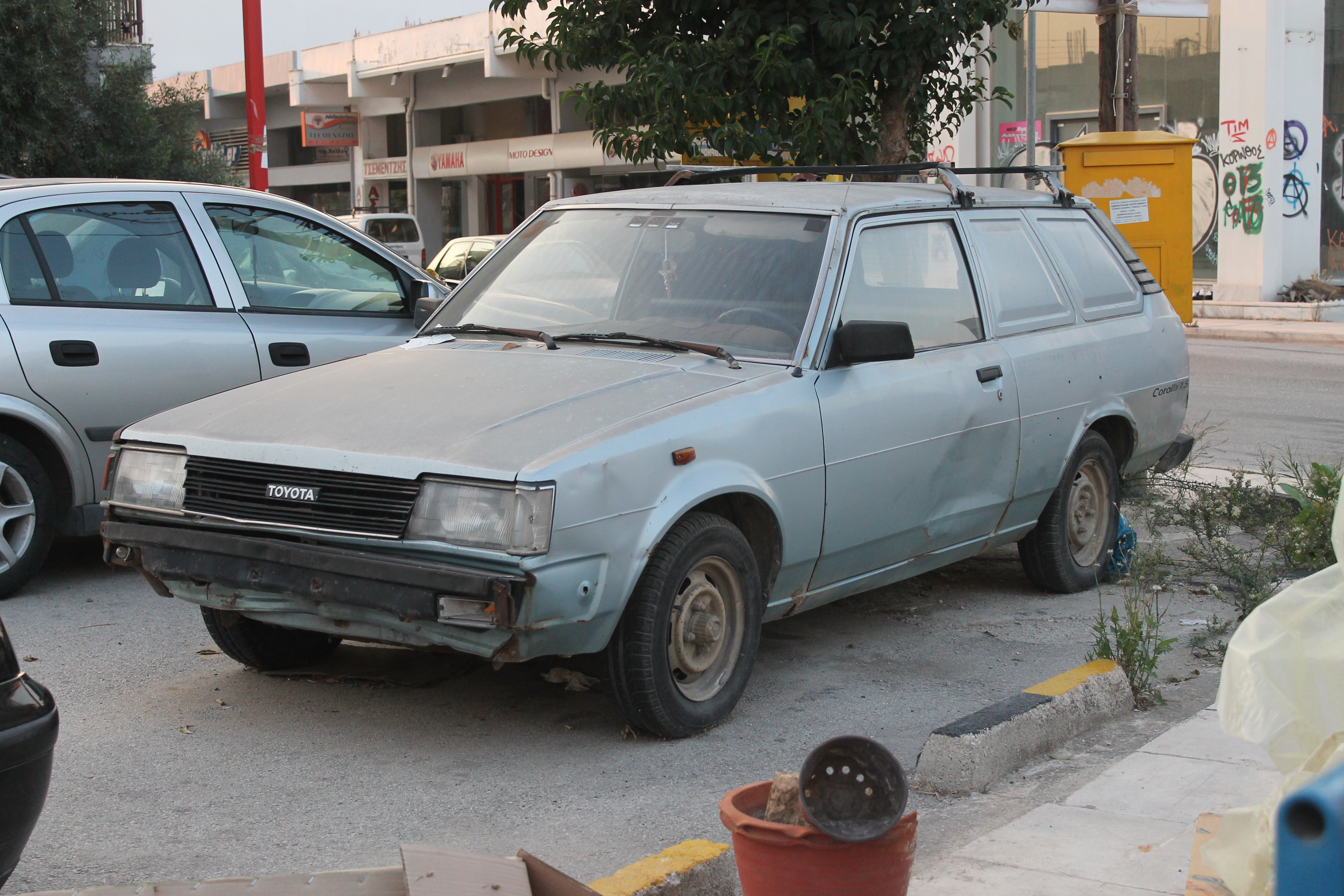
1983–1987 Toyota Corolla 3-door panel van (KE74V; Greece)

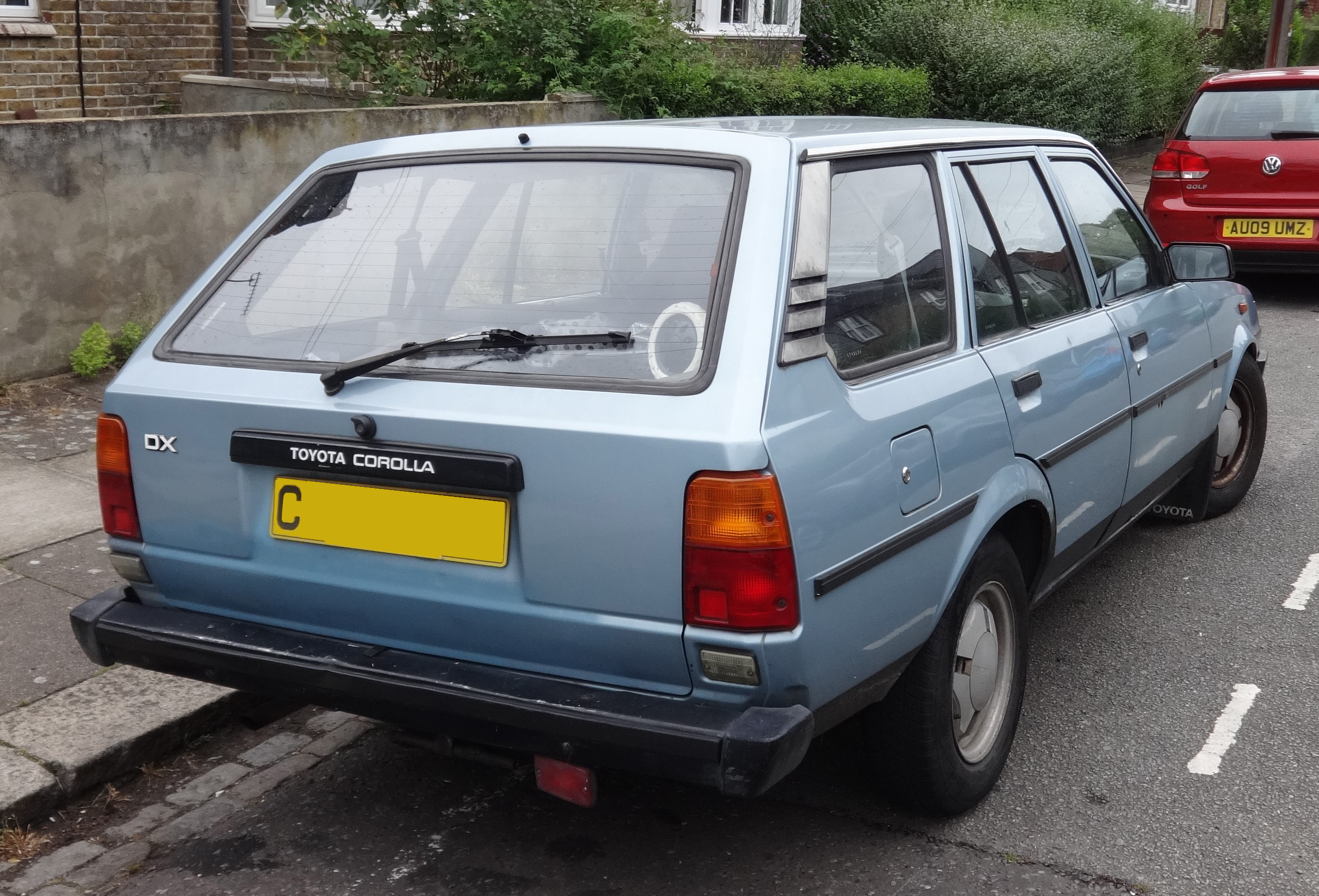
1981–1987 Corolla DX wagon (United Kingdom)

== Asia ==
This generation of Corolla was marketed in many Asian countries and was also locally built in Indonesia, Malaysia, Thailand, and the Philippines. Generally, the 4-door sedan body style with 1.3-litre 4K engine was available for this market.

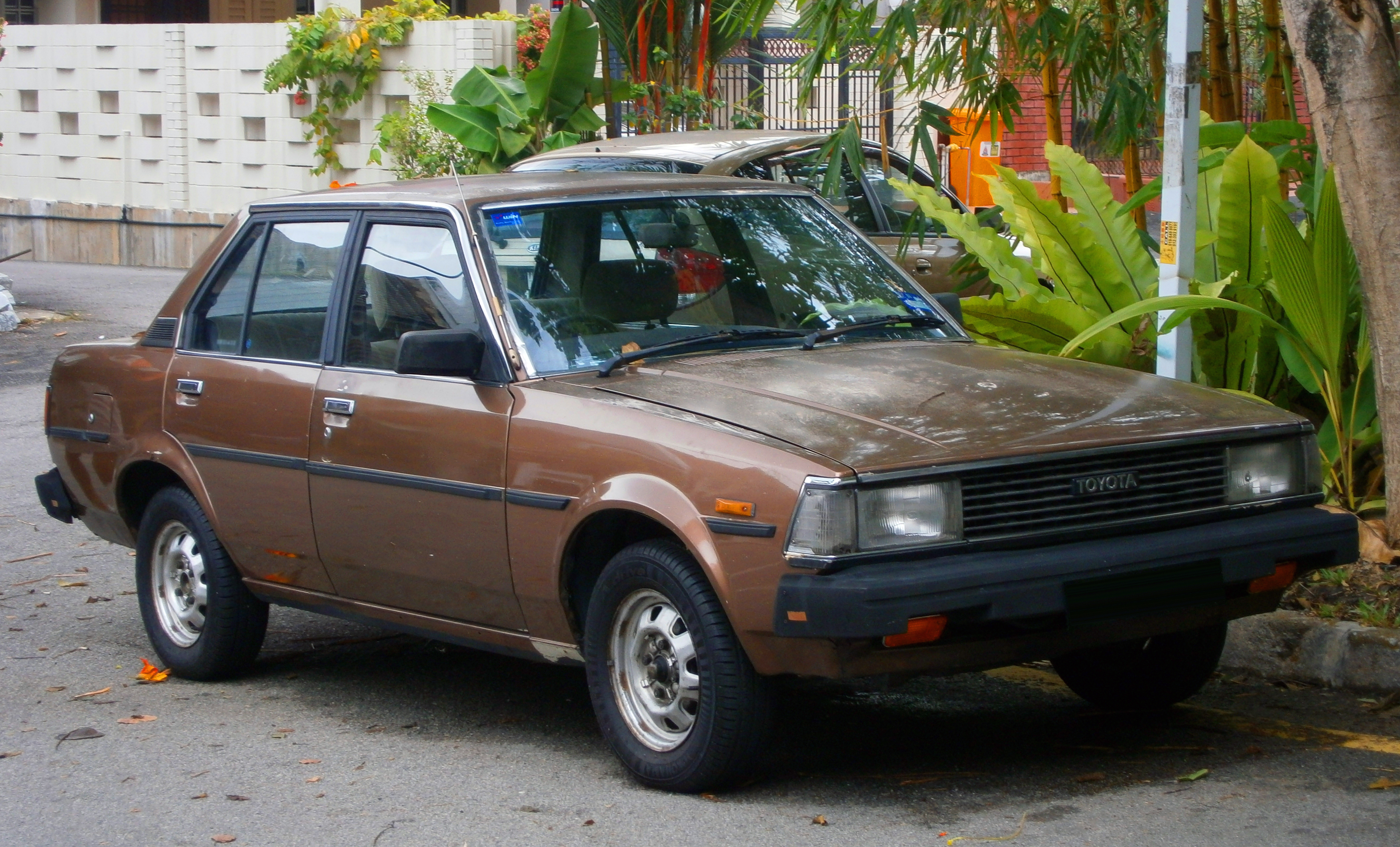
1981–1984 Corolla GL sedan (KE70; Malaysia)

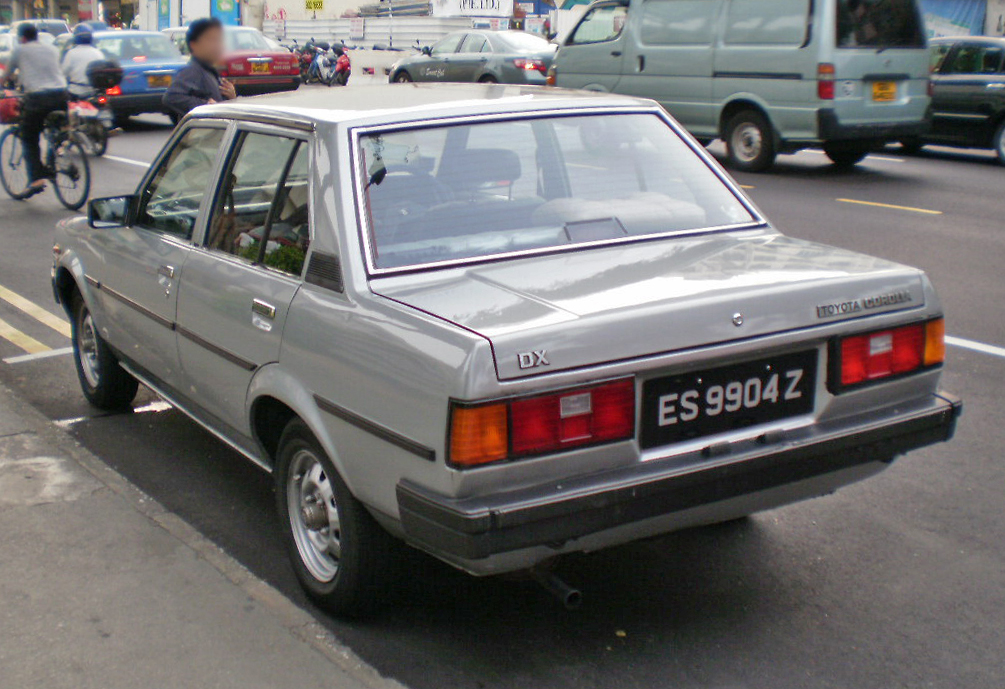
1981–1984 Corolla DX sedan (KE70; Singapore)

== Motorsport ==
Win Percy won the 1982 British Saloon Car Championship driving an E70 series Toyota Corolla GT.
