= Robin Brundle =

British racing driver and businessman (born 1962)

- Nationality: (United Kingdom) British
- Born: Robin Charles Brundle; 19 September 1962 (age 64) King's Lynn, Norfolk, England

British Saloon / Touring Car Championship
- Years active: 1982, 1984, 1990
- Teams: Roger Dowson Engineering; Techspeed Motorsport
- Starts: 15
- Wins: 0 (1 in class)
- Poles: 0 (1 in class)
- Fastest laps: 0 (1 in class)
- Best finish: 18th in 1982

Robin Charles Brundle (born 19 September 1962 in King's Lynn, Norfolk) is a British racing driver and businessman. In January 2009, he was appointed as managing director of Lola Cars. He still occasionally competes in historic racing events. He is the younger brother of former Formula One driver and current Sky Sports F1 commentator Martin Brundle.

Brundle previously ran a family car dealership in his home town of King's Lynn known as the Brundle Group. In 2007, he was appointed managing director of Aston Martin Racing, before moving on to Lola. He was appointed as a non-executive director of the Queen Elizabeth Hospital, King's Lynn in 2006.

Brundle is married with two children. He is also a keen field hockey player.

== Racing career ==
Brundle has competed in a variety of racing events throughout his career.

=== British Touring Car Championship ===
Brundle's first BTCC season was 1982, alternating between an Audi 80 and a Toyota Celica. Being 19 and a half when he debuted at Mallory Park, he was the second youngest driver to race in the series after his older brother at the time. He peaked with two class podiums in the Celica.

After competing in the MG Metro Challenge in 1983, Brundle got a works drive for the ARG Metro team in the British Touring Car Championship in 1984.

Brundle last competed in the BTCC in 1990.

=== Other Motorsports ===
In 1984, Brundle raced in the two British rounds of the European Touring Car Championship.

In 1985, Brundle made a one off appearance in Truck racing for Renault in the British Truck Grand Prix.

Since then, Brundle has raced in various national saloon car championships with a BMW M3 and a Ford Sierra.

In 1990, Brundle drove for Derek Warwick's team in the Honda CRX Challenge and won at Castle Combe.

Brundle is a three time class winner of the Willhire 24 Hour race at Snetterton - in 1980 and 1982, both times with brother Martin, and again in 1991.

== Racing record ==
=== Complete British Saloon / Touring Car Championship results ===
(key) (Races in bold indicate pole position – 1973–1990 in class) (Races in italics indicate fastest lap – 1 point awarded ?–1989 in class)

Year	Team	Car	Class	1	2	3	4	5	6	7	8	9	10	11	12	13	DC	Pts	Class
1982	Robin Brundle	Audi 80 GLE	B	SIL; DNS	MAL ovr:4† cls:4†	OUL ovr:5† cls:4†	THR ovr:11 cls:4						BRH ovr:9 cls:4	SIL; Ret			18th	20	4th
1982	Robin Brundle	Toyota Celica GT	B					THR; DNS	SIL ovr:14 cls:3	DON; Ret	BRH ovr:13 cls:3	DON; DNS					18th	20	4th
1984	Computervision Racing with Esso	MG Metro Turbo	B	DON; Ret	SIL ovr:7 cls:2	OUL ovr:9 cls:1	THR ovr:8 cls:2	THR ovr:10 cls:3	SIL; NC	SNE	BRH	BRH	DON	SIL			WD	0	WD
1990	Techspeed Motorsport	BMW 318is	B	OUL	DON	THR	SIL	OUL	SIL	BRH ovr:12 cls:9	SNE	BRH	BIR	DON	THR	SIL	36th	2	23rd

† Events with 2 races staged for the different classes.

=== Complete European Touring Car Championship results ===
(key) (Races in bold indicate pole position) (Races in italics indicate fastest lap)

Year	Team	Car	1	2	3	4	5	6	7	8	9	10	11	12	DC	Pts
1984	(United Kingdom) **Computervision Racing with Esso**	MG Metro Turbo	MNZ	VAL	DON; Ret	PER	BRN	ZEL	SAL	NUR	SPA	SIL; Ret	ZOL	MUG	NC	0
