= Rad Dougall =

South African racing driver (born 1951)

- Nationality: (South Africa) South African
- Born: 7 September 1951 (age 75) Johannesburg, Gauteng, South Africa

British Saloon Car Championship
- Years active: 1978, 1980–1982
- Teams: Toleman Motorsport; Patrick MotorSport
- Starts: 14
- Wins: 0
- Poles: 1
- Fastest laps: 0
- Best finish: 19th in 1982

Robert Anthony Dougall (born 7 September 1951) is a South African former racing driver.

== Racing record ==
=== Complete European Formula Two Championship results ===
(key) (Races in bold indicate pole position; races in italics indicate fastest lap)

Year	Entrant	Chassis	Engine	1	2	3	4	5	6	7	8	9	10	11	12	Pos.	Pts
1978	Toleman Group Motorsport	March 782	BMW	THR; 3	HOC; 10	NÜR; Ret	PAU	MUG; 12	VAL; Ret	ROU; DNQ	DON; 6	NOG; DNQ	PER; Ret	MIS; Ret	HOC; Ret	13th	5
1979	Toleman Group Motorsport	March 782	Hart	SIL; Ret	HOC; 2	**THR**; 1	NÜR; 6	VAL; 5	MUG; 15							5th	19
1979	Toleman Group Motorsport	Ralt RT2	Hart							PAU; Ret	HOC; Ret	ZAN; Ret	PER; 6	MIS; Ret	DON; Ret	5th	19
1980	Cassani Racing Team	Ralt RT4	BMW	THR; DNS	HOC; 9	NÜR; Ret	VAL	PAU	SIL; 16	ZOL	MUG	ZAN	PER	MIS	HOC	NC	0

=== Complete British Saloon Car Championship results ===
(key) (Races in bold indicate pole position; races in italics indicate fastest lap.)

Year	Team	Car	Class	1	2	3	4	5	6	7	8	9	10	11	12	Pos.	Pts	Class
1978	BMW (GB) Racing with Toleman	BMW 530i	D	SIL	OUL	THR	BRH; Ret†	SIL ?†	DON	MAL	BRH	DON	BRH; 7	THR ?	OUL	NC	0	NC
1980	The Toleman Group	Ford Capri III 3.0s	D	MAL	OUL	THR	SIL	SIL	BRH	MAL	BRH; 3	THR	SIL			32nd	4	10th
1981	Patrick MotorSport	Rover 3500S	D	MAL	SIL	OUL	THR	BRH	SIL	SIL	DON	BRH	THR	**SIL**; 3		31st	4	10th
1982	Patrick MotorSport	Rover 3500S	D	SIL; 4	MAL; Ret†	OUL; 2†	THR; 5	THR; 4	SIL; 6	DON; 5	BRH; 6	DON	BRH	SIL		19th	18	6th

† Events with 2 races staged for the different classes.
