= AMG =

AMG may refer to:

== Arts and entertainment ==
- AMG (rapper) (Jason Lewis, born 1970)
- "AMG" (song), by Natanael Cano, Peso Pluma and Gabito Ballesteros, 2022
- Alpha Male Gorillas, an American band

== Businesses and organizations ==
=== Motoring businesses ===
- Mercedes-AMG (Aufrecht, Melcher, Großaspach), the high-performance subsidiary of Mercedes-Benz
- AB Motorfabriken i Göteborg, Swedish engine and automobile manufacturer 1897–1906
- AM General, an American heavy vehicle and contract automotive manufacturer

=== Entertainment businesses ===
- Academy Music Group, a British music venue operator
- Access Media Group, Canadian broadcasting and multimedia company
- Allen Media Group, an American media and entertainment company
- AllMusic, previously known as All-Music Guide and AMG, an American online music database
- Arab Media Group, a Dubai-based entertainment company

=== Other businesses and organizations ===
- AMG International (Advancing the Ministries of the Gospel), a Christian ministry
- Athletic Model Guild, a physique photography studio from 1945

== Science ==
- Algebraic multigrid method, in numerical analysis
- Amagat, abbreviated amg, a practical unit of volumetric number density
- Auxiliary metabolic genes, found in many bacteriophages

== Other uses ==
- Allied Military Government of Occupied Territories (AMGOT, later AMG), post-WWII military rule by Allied forces in former Axis-held territories
- Arzneimittelgesetz, a German drug law
- AMG (automobile), a Swedish car made 1903–1905

== See also ==
- OMG (disambiguation)
