= 1993 British Touring Car Championship =

36th season of the British Touring Car Championship

1993 BTCC season

Seasons
- ← 1992 1994 →

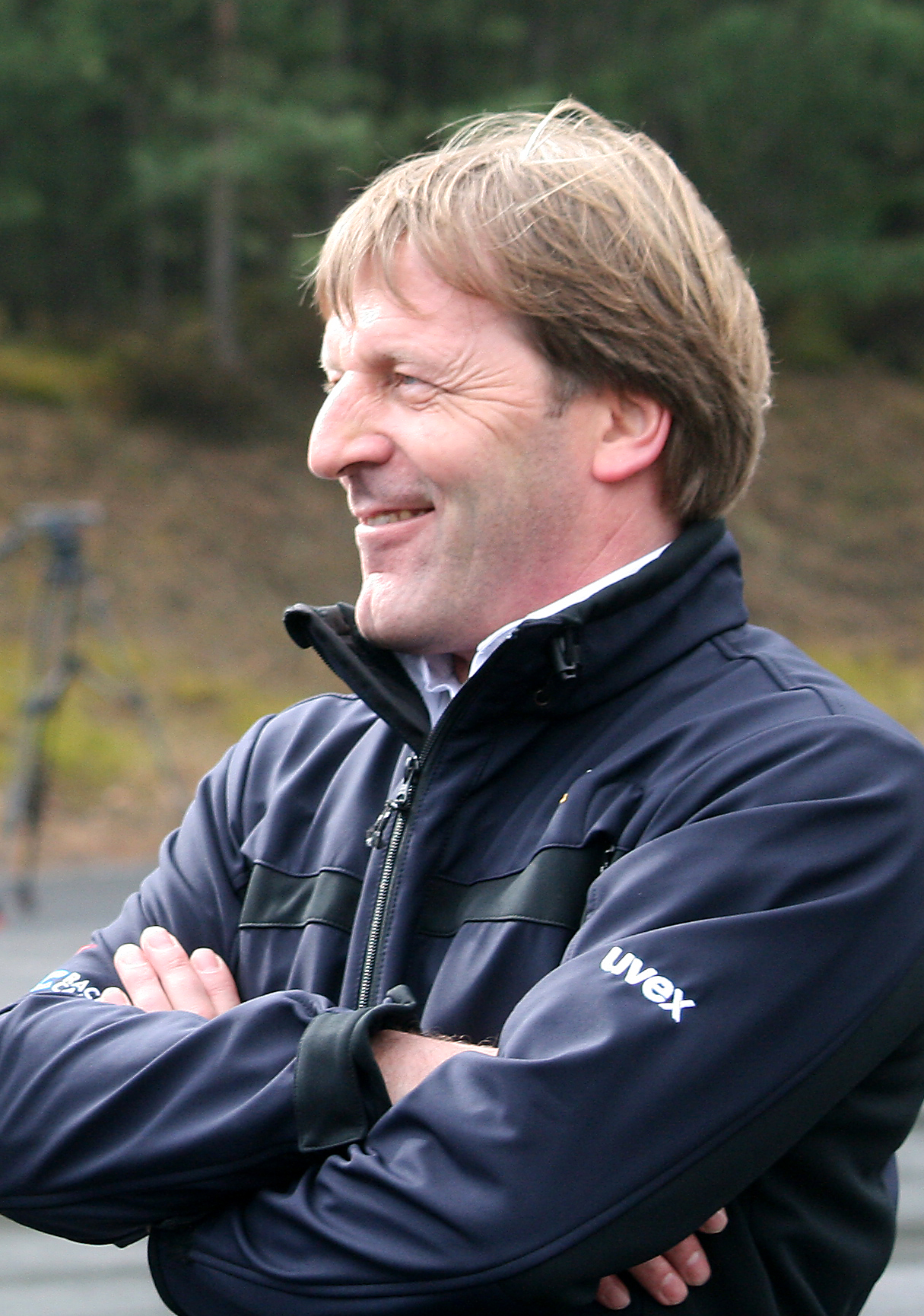
Joachim Winkelhock, the 1993 British Touring Car Champion.

The 1993 Auto Trader RAC British Touring Car Championship season was 36th British Touring Car Championship (BTCC) season.

== Season summary ==
At the end of 1992 BMW GB withdrew from the championship after the rules had been changed in a direction which BMW felt disadvantaged them. Prodrive, which had run the works operation for BMW, had been expected to be entering a works Mercedes-Benz team in cooperation with AMG, running the C-class. Prodrive stalwart Tim Sugden and Bernd Schneider were due to drive for the team. The plans were for a late season appearance leading to a full challenge in 1994, but this eventually came to nothing. Vic Lee Motorsport was liquidated after owner Vic Lee's drug scandal. The assets of the team were taken over by Steve Neal and Ray Bellm, who picked up personnel from Euroracing's discontinued sports car effort and merged it into Neal's Rimstock Racing outfit, creating Team Dynamics. Bellm would sell his share in the team later in the year, leaving Steve Neal as the only owner. The team started the 1993 season with three 1992-spec 318iS cars piloted by Matt Neal, Ray Bellm and Alex Portman, later dropping down to two.
Only weeks after BMW GB withdrew from the BTCC, BMW withdrew their Schnitzer Motorsport-run works operation from the German DTM championship, also there because of their disagreement with new rules. With few other series to contest in Schnitzer Motorsport were sent over by BMW to the British championship along with works drivers Steve Soper and Joachim Winkelhock.
Andy Rouse had lost his Toyota contract to famous Toyota tuners TOM'S Norfolk-based European arm known as Tom's GB, who had previously run Group A Toyotas in BTCC in the eighties. Andy Rouse's seat was taken over by Julian Bailey, and the new shape Carina E GTi replaced the older model. Toyota also supported a junior team run by Park Lane Racing, who would run two older shape Carinas for James Kaye and Bobby Verdon-Roe. Rouse himself had landed a Ford works deal, but the new Mondeo would not appear until after the season had started.
Vauxhall retained their John Cleland / Jeff Allam line-up in the Vauxhall Cavalier and their Ecurie Ecosse semi-works team; at Ecurie Ecosse David Leslie retained his seat and was after a few races joined by fellow Scotsman Harry Nuttall. Peugeot added Eugene O’Brien and Ian Flux to Robb Gravett for a three-car line-up in the Peugeot 405 Mi16 (with Flux’ car being run by Roy Kennedy Racing); Nissan ran three cars for Keith O'Dor, Win Percy and Tiff Needell, and Mazda returned with Patrick Watts in a brand new Xedos 6. Renault was the new manufacturer to join the championship with Alain Menu and reigning champion Tim Harvey as their drivers in the Renault 19 16v

The season started at Silverstone, where Steve Soper led team-mate Joachim Winkelhock home for a dominating BMW one-two. The second round at Donington Park was the support race for the European Grand Prix. The race was hit by torrential rain, and thanks to Michelin (whose wet-weather tyres were far superior to the ones of the other tire manufacturers) Renault was able to claim a one-two finish, Tim Harvey winning the race ahead of Alain Menu. It soon became apparent that Renault's pace was tied to conditions, as they struggled to match the championship's privateers in the dry.

A start line crash at the next round at Snetterton forced a red flag, and five cars failed to make the restart. The race would be won by Soper, with Julian Bailey in second and David Leslie in third. Winkelhock then took the victory at Round 4 at Donington Park ahead of Jeff Allam and Steve Soper. Winkelhock then took a commanding victory at Oulton Park, and as Steve Soper had gone off into a tyre wall and forced into retirement Winkelhock now took the championship lead by two points.

Brands Hatch hosted the first double header of the season. Winkelhock was at the centre of controversy when he shunted David Leslie out of the lead to take the win. Keith O’Dor finished second and Will Hoy third. Leslie was not amused, commenting that Winkelhock had not had any opportunity whatsoever to pull the pass off. Winkelhock apologized, saying he was a lot faster than Leslie in that corner but that there had been a bit of a misunderstanding when he tried his move. Winkelhock then led the second race when he made a mistake going into Clearways and went off into the Armco barrier and retirement. Will Hoy then went off at the same place, but ended up a bit further to the right and into the tires that covered some of the barriers at that corner. With both of his major contenders out Soper could take an easy win ahead of O’Dor and Jeff Allam.

The BTCC then headed to Wales for Round 8 at Pembrey, where Ford made its debut. Winkelhock won the race with Hoy in second and Soper in third. At the next round at Silverstone Toyota appeared to be heading home a one-two finish for Will Hoy and Julian Bailey. An over-ambitious move from Bailey however put Hoy on his roof and forced Bailey himself into retirement. It was instead Keith O’Dor who took his and Nissan's first BTCC victory. To make it a perfect day for Nissan his teammate Win Percy finished second in a drag race over the line with Paul Radisich, who took the returning Ford team's first podium.

Knockhill held the next double header of the season. A race long battle between Vauxhall driver John Cleland and Toyota driver Julian Bailey saw Cleland finally come out on top, with Will Hoy finishing in third. Further back, Soper lost valuable points when he was pushed off by Radisich in the Ford. Winkelhock was not able to start the second race due to clutch problems. It was now Bailey's turn to win a race, finishing ahead of Cleland and Hoy. The Renault team decided to skip the Scottish meeting and focus on developing their car.

Oulton Park hosted Round 12 which was the Gold Cup, and Renault's car updates appeared to have paid off. Both cars qualified and finished much better than before, Menu taking fourth. Up front Winkelhock led from start to finish while Soper was second ahead of Cleland.
Round 13 took place at Brands Hatch and Winkelhock and Leslie clashed again. First Winkelhock barged past Leslie to take second, and when Leslie attempted to retake the place he pushed Winkelhock into a spin. Both drivers dropped down the field while Radisich won the race from Soper and Peugeot driver Robb Gravett; Soper was however later penalised one position because of his rather forceful move on Gravett on the last lap to take second.

Leslie then finally won a race when the series visited Thruxton. Ford was second and third with Radisich and Andy Rouse, while a sixth place from Soper closed the gap between him and Winkelhock to twelve points.

Donington Park hosted the penultimate weekend of the championship and the last double header meeting. It also saw Nigel Mansell join the Ford team for the meeting. Radisich dominated the first race and won it by more than ten seconds, while wet weather conditions enabled Renault to finish second and third. A puncture had forced Soper to retire, and with Winkelhock finishing fifth the German now had the chance to take the title in the second race. Menu then won Race 2 from Radisich and Winkelhock, but as Soper finished fifth the championship would be decided in the final round at Silverstone.

At Silverstone the race was red flagged following an accident involving Robb Gravett's Peugeot. Will Hoy led away in the Toyota after the restart, but was later passed by both Paul Radisich and Andy Rouse, who took a one-two finish for Ford. Hoy held on to third, and while Steve Soper finished ahead of Winkelhock he did not get the result he needed and it was Joachim Winkelhock who won the 1993 British Touring Car Championship. Despite missing the first part of the season Paul Radisich finished third in the championship, with John Cleland in fourth and Julian Bailey in fifth.

== Teams and drivers ==
Team	Car	No.	Drivers	Rounds
Manufacturers
(France) Renault Dealer Racing	Renault 19	1	(United Kingdom) Tim Harvey	1–8, 10–14
(France) Renault Dealer Racing	Renault 19	19	(Switzerland) Alain Menu	1–8, 10–14
(Japan) Team Securicor Toyota	Toyota Carina E	2	(United Kingdom) Will Hoy	All
(Japan) Team Securicor Toyota	Toyota Carina E	21	(United Kingdom) Julian Bailey	All
(United Kingdom) Vauxhall Sport	Vauxhall Cavalier	3	(United Kingdom) John Cleland	All
(United Kingdom) Vauxhall Sport	Vauxhall Cavalier	4	(United Kingdom) Jeff Allam	All
(United Kingdom) Team Mondeo	Ford Mondeo Si	5	(United Kingdom) Andy Rouse	7–14
(United Kingdom) Team Mondeo	Ford Mondeo Si	15	(New Zealand) Paul Radisich	7–14
(Germany) BMW Motorsport Team	BMW 318i	6	(United Kingdom) Steve Soper	All
(Germany) BMW Motorsport Team	BMW 318i	22	(Germany) Joachim Winkelhock	All
(United Kingdom) Park Lane Toyota Junior Team	Toyota Carina E	10	(United Kingdom) James Kaye	1–8, 10, 12–14
(United Kingdom) Park Lane Toyota Junior Team	Toyota Carina E	20	(United Kingdom) Bobby Verdon-Roe	All
(United Kingdom) RKR with Silkolene at Halfords	Peugeot 405 Mi16	14	(United Kingdom) Ian Flux	All
(United Kingdom) Nissan Castrol Racing	Nissan Primera eGT	23	(United Kingdom) Kieth O'dor	All
(United Kingdom) Nissan Castrol Racing	Nissan Primera eGT	24	(United Kingdom) Win Percy	1–4, 6–14
(United Kingdom) Nissan Castrol Racing	Nissan Primera eGT	24	(United Kingdom) Tiff Needell	5
(United Kingdom) Nissan Castrol Racing	Nissan Primera eGT	34	(United Kingdom) Tiff Needell	6–9, 11
(France) Peugeot Talbot Sport	Peugeot 405 Mi16	45	(United Kingdom) Robb Gravett	All
(France) Peugeot Talbot Sport	Peugeot 405 Mi16	46	(United Kingdom) Eugene O'Brien	All
(Japan) Mazda Racing Team	Mazda Xedos 6	66	(United Kingdom) Patrick Watts	All
(United Kingdom) Ecurie Ecosse Vauxhall	Vauxhall Cavalier	78	(United Kingdom) Tiff Needell	2
(United Kingdom) Ecurie Ecosse Vauxhall	Vauxhall Cavalier	78	(United Kingdom) Harry Nuttall	3–14
(United Kingdom) Ecurie Ecosse Vauxhall	Vauxhall Cavalier	79	(United Kingdom) David Leslie	All
(United Kingdom) Ecurie Ecosse Vauxhall	Vauxhall Cavalier	80	(United Kingdom) Chris Goodwin	11, 14
Independents
(United Kingdom) Team Dynamics	BMW 318is	11	(United Kingdom) Ray Bellm	2–4, 6–8
(United Kingdom) Team Dynamics	BMW 318is	11	(United Kingdom) Andy Wallace	5
(United Kingdom) Team Dynamics	BMW 318is	27	(United Kingdom) Alex Portman	1–6, 8–14
(United Kingdom) Team Dynamics	BMW 318is	13	(United Kingdom) Matt Neal	1–11
(United Kingdom) Team Dynamics	BMW 318i	77	(United Kingdom) Matt Neal	12–14
(United Kingdom) Pinkney Motorsport	BMW 318is	12	(United Kingdom) Dave Pinkney	1–8, 11
(United Kingdom) Tamchester Team Maxted	Vauxhall Cavalier	17	(United Kingdom) Ian Khan	All
(United Kingdom) Tamchester Team Maxted	Vauxhall Cavalier	16	(United Kingdom) Ian Ashley	1–8
(United Kingdom) Colin Davids Racing	Vauxhall Cavalier	16	(United Kingdom) Ian Ashley	10-14
(United Kingdom) Gareth Howell Racing	Ford Sierra Sapphire	18	(United Kingdom) Gareth Howell	None
(Sweden) Peggen Motorsport	BMW M3	25	(Sweden) Peggen Andersson	1–2
(United Kingdom) Jim Wheals	Ford Sierra Sapphire	26	(United Kingdom) Jim Wheals	3
(United Kingdom) Asquith Autosport	Mazda 323F	32	(United Kingdom) Ian Cantwell	1–3, 6, 8
(United Kingdom) Bob Berridge	Ford Sierra Sapphire	35	(United Kingdom) Bob Berridge	6, 8, 10–14

- Although Gareth Howell appeared on the entry list, he did not actually race.

== TOCA Shootout ==
=== Entrants ===
Team	Car	No.	Drivers
Manufacturers
(United Kingdom) Team Mondeo	Ford Mondeo Si	5	(United Kingdom) Nigel Mansell
(United Kingdom) Team Mondeo	Ford Mondeo Si	15	(New Zealand) Paul Radisich
(Germany) BMW Motorsport Team	BMW 318i	6	(United Kingdom) Steve Soper
(United Kingdom) Park Lane Toyota Junior Team	Toyota Carina E	8	(United Kingdom) Derek Warwick
(France) Peugeot Talbot Sport	Peugeot 405 Mi16	45	(United Kingdom) Robb Gravett
(France) Peugeot Talbot Sport	Peugeot 405 Mi16	46	(United Kingdom) Dave Coyne
(Japan) Mazda Racing Team	Mazda Xedos 6	66	(United Kingdom) Patrick Watts
(United Kingdom) Ecurie Ecosse Vauxhall	Vauxhall Cavalier	78	(United Kingdom) Tiff Needell
(United Kingdom) Ecurie Ecosse Vauxhall	Vauxhall Cavalier	79	(United Kingdom) David Leslie
(United Kingdom) Ecurie Ecosse Vauxhall	Vauxhall Cavalier	80	(United Kingdom) Hayden Measham
Independents
(United Kingdom) Team Dynamics	BMW 318i	11	(United Kingdom) Matt Neal
(United Kingdom) Team Dynamics	BMW 318is	27	(United Kingdom) Alex Portman
(United Kingdom) Team Dynamics	BMW 318is	77	(United Kingdom) Chris Rea
(United Kingdom) Pinkney Motorsport	BMW 318is	12	(United Kingdom) Dave Pinkney
(United Kingdom) Colin Davids Racing	Vauxhall Cavalier	16	(United Kingdom) Ian Ashley
(United Kingdom) Tamchester Team Maxted	Vauxhall Cavalier	17	(United Kingdom) Ian Khan
(Sweden) Thenander Motorsport	BMW M3	30	(Sweden) Bengt Thenander
(Netherlands) Petroline	BMW 318i	33	(Netherlands) Klaas Zwart

==== Results ====
TOCA Shootout
Pos.	Driver
1	(United Kingdom) David Leslie
2	(New Zealand) Paul Radisich
3	(United Kingdom) Steve Soper
4	(United Kingdom) Robb Gravett
5	(United Kingdom) Dave Coyne
6	(United Kingdom) Tiff Needell
7	(United Kingdom) Ian Ashley
NC	(United Kingdom) Matt Neal
NC	(United Kingdom) Nigel Mansell
NC	(Sweden) Bengt Thenander
NC	(United Kingdom) Ian Khan
NC	(United Kingdom) Hayden Measham
NC	(United Kingdom) David Pinkney
NC	(United Kingdom) Derek Warwick
NC	(United Kingdom) Chris Rea
NC	(Netherlands) Klaas Zwart
NC	(United Kingdom) Patrick Watts
NC	(United Kingdom) Alex Portman

== Race calendar and winners ==
All races were held in the United Kingdom.

Round		Circuit	Date	Pole position	Fastest lap	Winning driver	Winning team	Winning privateer
1	R1	Silverstone (National), Northamptonshire	28 March	(United Kingdom) Steve Soper	(Germany) Joachim Winkelhock	(United Kingdom) Steve Soper	BMW Motorsport Team	(United Kingdom) Matt Neal
2	R2	Donington Park (GP), Leicestershire	11 April	(United Kingdom) Steve Soper	(United Kingdom) Tim Harvey	(United Kingdom) Tim Harvey	Renault Dealer Racing	(United Kingdom) Ian Cantwell
3	R3	Snetterton Circuit, Norfolk	3 May	(United Kingdom) Patrick Watts	(Germany) Joachim Winkelhock	(United Kingdom) Steve Soper	BMW Motorsport Team	(United Kingdom) Ian Ashley
4	R4	Donington Park (GP), Leicestershire	16 May	(Germany) Joachim Winkelhock	(Germany) Joachim Winkelhock	(Germany) Joachim Winkelhock	BMW Motorsport Team	(United Kingdom) Matt Neal
5	R5	Oulton Park, Cheshire	31 May	(United Kingdom) John Cleland	(United Kingdom) John Cleland	(Germany) Joachim Winkelhock	BMW Motorsport Team	(United Kingdom) Ian Ashley
6	R6	Brands Hatch (Indy), Kent	13 June	(United Kingdom) David Leslie	(United Kingdom) Keith O'Dor	(Germany) Joachim Winkelhock	BMW Motorsport Team	(United Kingdom) Ray Bellm
6	R7	Brands Hatch (Indy), Kent	13 June		(Germany) Joachim Winkelhock	(United Kingdom) Steve Soper	BMW Motorsport Team	(United Kingdom) Ray Bellm
7	R8	Pembrey Circuit, Carmarthenshire	27 June	(United Kingdom) David Leslie	(United Kingdom) David Leslie	(Germany) Joachim Winkelhock	BMW Motorsport Team	(United Kingdom) Ian Khan
8	R9	Silverstone (GP), Northamptonshire	11 July	(United Kingdom) Keith O'Dor	(United Kingdom) Patrick Watts	(United Kingdom) Keith O'Dor	Nissan Castrol Racing	(United Kingdom) Ian Khan
9	R10	Knockhill Racing Circuit, Fife	25 July	(United Kingdom) Julian Bailey	(United Kingdom) Jeff Allam	(United Kingdom) John Cleland	Vauxhall Sport	(United Kingdom) Matt Neal
9	R11	Knockhill Racing Circuit, Fife	25 July		(United Kingdom) Julian Bailey	(United Kingdom) Julian Bailey	Team Securicor Toyota	(United Kingdom) Alex Portman
10	R12	Oulton Park, Cheshire	8 August	(Germany) Joachim Winkelhock	(Germany) Joachim Winkelhock	(Germany) Joachim Winkelhock	BMW Motorsport Team	(United Kingdom) Alex Portman
11	R13	Brands Hatch (Indy), Kent	22 August	(United Kingdom) David Leslie	(Germany) Joachim Winkelhock	(New Zealand) Paul Radisich	Team Mondeo	(United Kingdom) Ian Khan
12	R14	Thruxton Circuit, Hampshire	30 August	(United Kingdom) David Leslie	(United Kingdom) David Leslie	(United Kingdom) David Leslie	Ecurie Ecosse Vauxhall	(United Kingdom) Matt Neal
13	R15	Donington Park (GP), Leicestershire	12 September	(New Zealand) Paul Radisich	(United Kingdom) Tim Harvey	(New Zealand) Paul Radisich	Team Mondeo	(United Kingdom) Alex Portman
13	R16	Donington Park (GP), Leicestershire	12 September		(New Zealand) Paul Radisich	(Switzerland) Alain Menu	Renault Dealer Racing	(United Kingdom) Ian Ashley
14	R17	Silverstone (National), Northamptonshire	19 September	(New Zealand) Paul Radisich	(New Zealand) Paul Radisich	(New Zealand) Paul Radisich	Team Mondeo	(United Kingdom) Ian Khan

== Championship results ==
=== Drivers Championship ===
Pos	Driver	SIL	DON	SNE	DON	OUL	BRH		PEM	SIL	KNO		OUL	BRH	THR	DON		SIL	Pts
1	(Germany) Joachim Winkelhock	2	Ret	5	**1**	1	1	**Ret**	1	4	3	DNS	**1**	20	14	5	3	8	163
2	(United Kingdom) Steve Soper	**1**	**3**	1	3	Ret	4	1	3	Ret	12	8	2	3	6	Ret	5	5	150
3	(New Zealand) Paul Radisich								8	3	5	5	Ret	1	2	**1**	**2**	**1**	110
4	(United Kingdom) John Cleland	3	4	10	7	**2**	Ret	5	7	6	1	**2**	3	12	8	Ret	6	7	102
5	(United Kingdom) Julian Bailey	Ret	7	2	5	15	6	9	4	Ret	**2**	1	5	7	7	7	17	6	88
6	(United Kingdom) Kieth O'Dor	Ret	5	DNS	9	4	2	2	5	**1**	7	11	10	5	11	8	11	11	82
7	(United Kingdom) Will Hoy	4	Ret	4	6	Ret	3	14	2	Ret	10	3	Ret	4	10	16	16	3	79
8	(United Kingdom) David Leslie	Ret	Ret	3	8	Ret	**18**	6	**Ret**	5	9	7	7	**13**	**1**	4	8	4	72
9	(United Kingdom) Jeff Allam	5	6	DNS	2	3	7	3	10	18	6	6	6	15	13	11	12	9	67
10	(Switzerland) Alain Menu	10	2	Ret	13	Ret	15	Ret	Ret	8			4	9	9	2	1	Ret	57
11	(United Kingdom) Andy Rouse								Ret	Ret	16	10	Ret	6	3	DSQ	4	2	41
12	(United Kingdom) Win Percy	7	Ret	8	11		5	4	9	2	DNS	DNS	18	11	Ret	10	7	Ret	38
13	(United Kingdom) Robb Gravett	Ret	Ret	7	14	DNS	DSQ	16	11	9	Ret	DNS	Ret	2	4	17	13	DNS	34
14	(United Kingdom) Tim Harvey	11	1	Ret	16	Ret	11	8	Ret	Ret			Ret	14	16	3	Ret	15	31
15	(United Kingdom) Patrick Watts	6	Ret	**DNS**	4	Ret	10	Ret	Ret	Ret	4	4	Ret	8	12	Ret	DNS	12	29
16	(United Kingdom) Eugene O'Brien	Ret	Ret	13	Ret	5	12	11	Ret	Ret	8	Ret	9	10	5	6	15	Ret	23
17	(United Kingdom) Harry Nuttall			16	15	8	Ret	DNS	6	7	11	9	8	Ret	15	9	Ret	13	16
18	(United Kingdom) Ian Flux	9	8	11	10	6	9	7	14	Ret	15	13	11	Ret	18	Ret	10	18	14
19	(United Kingdom) Bobby Verdon-Roe	14	Ret	6	12	7	8	15	15	12	Ret	Ret	13	17	17	Ret	DNS	Ret	11
20	(United Kingdom) Matt Neal	8	Ret	DNS	17	Ret	14	Ret	18	13	14	15	16	18	19	13	14	17	3
21	(United Kingdom) James Kaye	13	11	9	Ret	Ret	Ret	DNS	Ret	10	DNS	DNS	12		20	14	Ret	14	3
22	(United Kingdom) Ian Cantwell	12	9	Ret			Ret	17	DNQ	16									2
23	(United Kingdom) Ian Ashley	Ret	12	12	Ret	9	17	13	13	17			17	21	Ret	15	9	19	2
24	(United Kingdom) Ian Khan	15	10	17	Ret	14	Ret	DNS	12	11	18	Ret	15	16	21	DNS	18	16	1
25	(United Kingdom) Alex Portman	Ret	Ret	15	19	10	16	Ret	DNQ	Ret	17	14	14	Ret	22	12	Ret	21	1
26	(United Kingdom) Chris Goodwin													Ret				10	1
27	(United Kingdom) Tiff Needell		Ret			12	Ret	10	19	Ret	13	12		Ret					0
28	(United Kingdom) Andy Wallace					11													0
29	(United Kingdom) Ray Bellm		Ret	DNS	18		13	12	17	14									0
30	(United Kingdom) David Pinkney	Ret	13	14	Ret	13	Ret	Ret	16	15				19					0
31	(United Kingdom) Bob Berridge						Ret	DNS		Ret			Ret	DSQ	Ret	18	Ret	20	0
—	(Sweden) Peggen Andersson	Ret	Ret																0
—	(United Kingdom) Jim Wheals			Ret															0
Pos	Driver	SIL	DON	SNE	DON	OUL	BRH		PEM	SIL	KNO		OUL	BRH	THR	DON		SIL	Pts

Colour	Result
Gold	Winner
Silver	Second place
Bronze	Third place
Green	Points classification
Blue	Non-points classification
Blue	Non-classified finish (NC)
Purple	Retired, not classified (Ret)
Red	Did not qualify (DNQ)
Red	Did not pre-qualify (DNPQ)
Black	Disqualified (DSQ)
White	Did not start (DNS)
White	Withdrew (WD)
White	Race cancelled (C)
Blank	Did not practice (DNP)
Blank	Did not arrive (DNA)
Blank	Excluded (EX)

- Note: **bold** signifies pole position, italics signifies fastest lap.

=== TOCA Challenge for Privateers ===
Pos	Driver	SIL	DON	SNE	DON	OUL	BRH		PEM	SIL	KNO		OUL	BRH	THR	DON		SIL	Pts
1	(United Kingdom) Matt Neal	8	Ret	DNS	17	Ret	14	Ret	18	13	14	15	16	18	19	13	14	17	194
2	(United Kingdom) Ian Khan	15	10	17	Ret	14	Ret	DNS	12	11	18	Ret	15	16	21	DNS	18	16	192
3	(United Kingdom) Ian Ashley	Ret	12	12	Ret	9	17	13	13	17			17	21	Ret	15	9	19	148
4	(United Kingdom) Alex Portman	Ret	Ret	15	19	10	16	Ret	DNQ	Ret	17	14	14	Ret	22	12	Ret	21	125
5	(United Kingdom) David Pinkney	Ret	13	14	Ret	13	Ret	Ret	16	15				19					70
6	(United Kingdom) Ray Bellm		Ret	DNS	18		13	12	17	14									64
7	(United Kingdom) Ian Cantwell	12	9	Ret			Ret	17	DNQ	16									56
8	(United Kingdom) Bob Berridge						Ret	DNS		Ret			Ret	DSQ	Ret	18	Ret	20	15
9	(United Kingdom) Andy Wallace					11													12
–	(Sweden) Peggen Andersson	Ret	Ret																0
–	(United Kingdom) Jim Wheals			Ret															0
Pos	Driver	SIL	DON	SNE	DON	OUL	BRH		PEM	SIL	KNO		OUL	BRH	THR	DON		SIL	Pts

=== Manufacturers Championship ===
Pos	Manufacturer	SIL	DON	SNE	DON	OUL	BRH		PEM	SIL	KNO		OUL	BRH	THR	DON		SIL	Pts
1	BMW / BMW Motorsport Team	1	3	1	1	1	1	1	1	4	3	8	1	3	6	5	3	5	251
2	Vauxhall / Vauxhall Sport/Ecurie Ecosse	3	4	3	2	2	7	3	6	5	1	2	3	12	1	4	6	4	198
3	Toyota / Team Securicor Toyota/Park Lane Toyota Junior Team	4	7	2	5	15	3	9	2	Ret	2	1	5	4	7	7	16	3	159
4	Nissan / Nissan Castrol Racing	7	5	8	9	4	2	2	5	1	7	11	10	5	11	8	7	11	138
5	Ford / Team Mondeo								8	3	5	5	Ret	1	2	1	2	1	122
6	Peugeot / Peugeot Sport/Roy Kennedy Racing	9	8	7	10	5	9	7	11	9	8	13	9	2	4	6	10	18	111
7	Renault / Renault Dealer Racing	10	1	Ret	13	Ret	11	8	Ret	8			4	9	9	2	1	15	93
8	Mazda / Mazda Racing Team	6	Ret	DNS	4	Ret	10	Ret	Ret	Ret	4	4	Ret	8	12	Ret	DNS	12	51
Pos	Driver	SIL	DON	SNE	DON	OUL	BRH		PEM	SIL	KNO		OUL	BRH	THR	DON		SIL	Pts
