= 2001 FIA GT Zolder 500km =

Layout of the Circuit Zolder (1986–2001)

The 2001 FIA GT Zolder 500 km was the fifth round the 2001 FIA GT Championship season. It took place at the Circuit Zolder, Belgium, on May 20, 2001.

== Official results ==
Class winners in bold. Cars failing to complete 70% of winner's distance marked as Not Classified (NC).

Pos	Class	No	Team	Drivers	Chassis	Tyre	Laps
Pos	Class	No	Team	Drivers	Engine	Tyre	Laps
1	**GT**	**7**	**(France) Larbre Compétition Chéreau**	**(France) Christophe Bouchut (France) Jean-Philippe Belloc**	**Chrysler Viper GTS-R**	MI	**111**
1	**GT**	**7**	**(France) Larbre Compétition Chéreau**	**(France) Christophe Bouchut (France) Jean-Philippe Belloc**	**Chrysler 8.0L V10**	MI	**111**
2	GT	3	(Netherlands) Team Carsport Holland	(Netherlands) Jeroen Bleekemolen (Netherlands) Mike Hezemans	Chrysler Viper GTS-R	MI	111
2	GT	3	(Netherlands) Team Carsport Holland	(Netherlands) Jeroen Bleekemolen (Netherlands) Mike Hezemans	Chrysler 8.0L V10	MI	111
3	GT	6	(Italy) Team Rafanelli	(Belgium) Marc Duez (Germany) Günther Blieninger	Ferrari 550 Maranello	MI	111
3	GT	6	(Italy) Team Rafanelli	(Belgium) Marc Duez (Germany) Günther Blieninger	Ferrari 6.0L V12	MI	111
4	GT	10	(France) Paul Belmondo Competition	(France) Claude-Yves Gosselin (France) Paul Belmondo	Chrysler Viper GTS-R	D	109
4	GT	10	(France) Paul Belmondo Competition	(France) Claude-Yves Gosselin (France) Paul Belmondo	Chrysler 8.0L V10	D	109
5	GT	9	(France) Team A.R.T.	(France) Jean-Pierre Jarier (France) François Lafon	Chrysler Viper GTS-R	D	109
5	GT	9	(France) Team A.R.T.	(France) Jean-Pierre Jarier (France) François Lafon	Chrysler 8.0L V10	D	109
6	GT	24	(Italy) Racing Box	(Italy) Luca Cappellari (Italy) Gabriele Matteuzzi	Chrysler Viper GTS-R	D	109
6	GT	24	(Italy) Racing Box	(Italy) Luca Cappellari (Italy) Gabriele Matteuzzi	Chrysler 8.0L V10	D	109
7	**N-GT**	**54**	**(Italy) ART Engineering**	**(Italy) Fabio Babini (Italy) Luigi Moccia**	**Porsche 911 GT3-RS**	P	**108**
7	**N-GT**	**54**	**(Italy) ART Engineering**	**(Italy) Fabio Babini (Italy) Luigi Moccia**	**Porsche 3.6L Flat-6**	P	**108**
8	N-GT	57	(Germany) Freisinger Motorsport	(Germany) Wolfgang Kaufmann (France) Stéphane Ortelli	Porsche 911 GT3-RS	Y	108
8	N-GT	57	(Germany) Freisinger Motorsport	(Germany) Wolfgang Kaufmann (France) Stéphane Ortelli	Porsche 3.6L Flat-6	Y	108
9	N-GT	77	(Germany) RWS Motorsport	(Italy) Luca Riccitelli (Italy) Andrea Boldrini	Porsche 911 GT3-RS	MI	108
9	N-GT	77	(Germany) RWS Motorsport	(Italy) Luca Riccitelli (Italy) Andrea Boldrini	Porsche 3.6L Flat-6	MI	108
10	N-GT	55	(France) Perspective Racing	(France) Thierry Perrier (Belgium) Michel Neugarten	Porsche 911 GT3-RS	D	107
10	N-GT	55	(France) Perspective Racing	(France) Thierry Perrier (Belgium) Michel Neugarten	Porsche 3.6L Flat-6	D	107
11	N-GT	53	(Italy) ART Engineering	(Italy) Alberto Radaelli (Italy) Andrea Bertolini	Porsche 911 GT3-R	P	107
11	N-GT	53	(Italy) ART Engineering	(Italy) Alberto Radaelli (Italy) Andrea Bertolini	Porsche 3.6L Flat-6	P	107
12	GT	18	(Belgium) PSI Motorsport Team	(Belgium) Kurt Mollekens (Belgium) Stéphane Cohen	Porsche 911 Bi-Turbo	D	107
12	GT	18	(Belgium) PSI Motorsport Team	(Belgium) Kurt Mollekens (Belgium) Stéphane Cohen	Porsche 3.6L Turbo Flat-6	D	107
13	N-GT	60	(Switzerland) Haberthur Racing	(France) Sylvain Noël (France) Laurent Cazenave	Porsche 911 GT3-R	D	107
13	N-GT	60	(Switzerland) Haberthur Racing	(France) Sylvain Noël (France) Laurent Cazenave	Porsche 3.6L Flat-6	D	107
14	N-GT	67	(Italy) MAC Racing	(France) Olivier Porta (France) Stéphane Daoudi	Porsche 911 GT3-R	D	107
14	N-GT	67	(Italy) MAC Racing	(France) Olivier Porta (France) Stéphane Daoudi	Porsche 3.6L Flat-6	D	107
15	N-GT	58	(Germany) Freisinger Motorsport	(Japan) Yukihiro Hane (Belgium) Tim Verbergt	Porsche 911 GT3-R	Y	106
15	N-GT	58	(Germany) Freisinger Motorsport	(Japan) Yukihiro Hane (Belgium) Tim Verbergt	Porsche 3.6L Flat-6	Y	106
16	N-GT	65	(Czech Republic) Coca-Cola Racing Team	(Czech Republic) Josef Venč (Slovakia) Jirko Malchárek (United States) Tom Sedivy	Porsche 911 GT3-RS	D	103
16	N-GT	65	(Czech Republic) Coca-Cola Racing Team	(Czech Republic) Josef Venč (Slovakia) Jirko Malchárek (United States) Tom Sedivy	Porsche 3.6L Flat-6	D	103
17	N-GT	66	(China) Gammon Megaspeed	(Hong Kong) Alex Li (United Kingdom) Nigel Albon	Porsche 911 GT3-R	MI	100
17	N-GT	66	(China) Gammon Megaspeed	(Hong Kong) Alex Li (United Kingdom) Nigel Albon	Porsche 3.6L Flat-6	MI	100
18 DNF	N-GT	76	(Germany) RWS Motorsport	(Italy) Giovanni Gulinelli (Italy) Gianni Collini	Porsche 911 GT3-R	MI	100
18 DNF	N-GT	76	(Germany) RWS Motorsport	(Italy) Giovanni Gulinelli (Italy) Gianni Collini	Porsche 3.6L Flat-6	MI	100
19 DNF	GT	21	(Belgium) GLPK Racing	(Belgium) Wim Daems (Hungary) Tamás Illés	Chrysler Viper GTS-R	D	91
19 DNF	GT	21	(Belgium) GLPK Racing	(Belgium) Wim Daems (Hungary) Tamás Illés	Chrysler 8.0L V10	D	91
20 DNF	N-GT	50	(France) Larbre Compétition Chéreau	(France) Patrice Goueslard (France) Sébastien Dumez	Porsche 911 GT3-RS	MI	76
20 DNF	N-GT	50	(France) Larbre Compétition Chéreau	(France) Patrice Goueslard (France) Sébastien Dumez	Porsche 3.6L Flat-6	MI	76
21 DNF	N-GT	69	(Italy) Autorlando Sport	(Austria) Philipp Peter (Switzerland) Joël Camathias	Porsche 911 GT3-RS	P	72
21 DNF	N-GT	69	(Italy) Autorlando Sport	(Austria) Philipp Peter (Switzerland) Joël Camathias	Porsche 3.6L Flat-6	P	72
22 DNF	GT	11	(France) Paul Belmondo Racing	(Belgium) Anthony Kumpen (France) Didier Defourny	Chrysler Viper GTS-R	D	61
22 DNF	GT	11	(France) Paul Belmondo Racing	(Belgium) Anthony Kumpen (France) Didier Defourny	Chrysler 8.0L V10	D	61
23 DNF	GT	12	(France) Paul Belmondo Racing	(France) Boris Derichebourg (Belgium) Vincent Vosse	Chrysler Viper GTS-R	D	43
23 DNF	GT	12	(France) Paul Belmondo Racing	(France) Boris Derichebourg (Belgium) Vincent Vosse	Chrysler 8.0L V10	D	43
24 DNF	N-GT	61	(Switzerland) Haberthur Racing	(Italy) Mauro Casadei (United Kingdom) Nigel Smith	Porsche 911 GT3-R	D	36
24 DNF	N-GT	61	(Switzerland) Haberthur Racing	(Italy) Mauro Casadei (United Kingdom) Nigel Smith	Porsche 3.6L Flat-6	D	36
25 DNF	GT	8	(Germany) Proton Competition	(Germany) Christian Ried (Germany) Gerold Ried	Porsche 911 GT2	Y	26
25 DNF	GT	8	(Germany) Proton Competition	(Germany) Christian Ried (Germany) Gerold Ried	Porsche 3.8L Turbo Flat-6	Y	26
26 DNF	N-GT	52	(United Kingdom) EMKA Racing	(United Kingdom) Tim Sugden (United Kingdom) Steve O'Rourke	Porsche 911 GT3-R	D	25
26 DNF	N-GT	52	(United Kingdom) EMKA Racing	(United Kingdom) Tim Sugden (United Kingdom) Steve O'Rourke	Porsche 3.6L Flat-6	D	25
27 DNF	GT	2	(United Kingdom) Lister Storm Racing	(United Kingdom) Julian Bailey (Germany) Nicolaus Springer	Lister Storm	MI	23
27 DNF	GT	2	(United Kingdom) Lister Storm Racing	(United Kingdom) Julian Bailey (Germany) Nicolaus Springer	Jaguar 7.0L V12	MI	23
28 DNF	GT	19	(Germany) Reiter Engineering	(Germany) Michael Trunk (Germany) Bernhard Müller	Lamborghini Diablo GTR	D	19
28 DNF	GT	19	(Germany) Reiter Engineering	(Germany) Michael Trunk (Germany) Bernhard Müller	Lamborghini 6.0L V12	D	19
29 DNF	GT	4	(Netherlands) Team Carsport Holland	(Netherlands) Michael Bleekemolen (Netherlands) Sebastiaan Bleekemolen	Chrysler Viper GTS-R	MI	18
29 DNF	GT	4	(Netherlands) Team Carsport Holland	(Netherlands) Michael Bleekemolen (Netherlands) Sebastiaan Bleekemolen	Chrysler 8.0L V10	MI	18
30 DNF	N-GT	62	(France) JMB Competition	(Italy) Christian Pescatori (France) David Terrien	Ferrari 360 Modena N-GT	MI	18
30 DNF	N-GT	62	(France) JMB Competition	(Italy) Christian Pescatori (France) David Terrien	Ferrari 3.6L V8	MI	18
31 DNF	GT	25	(Belgium) Silver Racing	(Belgium) Robert Dierick (Belgium) Eric De Doncker	Chrysler Viper GTS-R	D	14
31 DNF	GT	25	(Belgium) Silver Racing	(Belgium) Robert Dierick (Belgium) Eric De Doncker	Chrysler 8.0L V10	D	14
32 DNF	GT	5	(Italy) Team Rafanelli	(Italy) Emanuele Naspetti (Italy) Mimmo Schiattarella	Ferrari 550 Maranello	MI	13
32 DNF	GT	5	(Italy) Team Rafanelli	(Italy) Emanuele Naspetti (Italy) Mimmo Schiattarella	Ferrari 6.0L V12	MI	13
DSQ^{†}	GT	1	(United Kingdom) Lister Storm Racing	(United Kingdom) Jamie Campbell-Walter (Netherlands) Tom Coronel	Lister Storm	MI	111
DSQ^{†}	GT	1	(United Kingdom) Lister Storm Racing	(United Kingdom) Jamie Campbell-Walter (Netherlands) Tom Coronel	Jaguar 7.0L V12	MI	111
DNS	N-GT	59	(Germany) Freisinger Racing	(Russia) Alexey Vasilyev (Russia) Nikolai Fomenko	Porsche 911 GT3-R	Y	–
DNS	N-GT	59	(Germany) Freisinger Racing	(Russia) Alexey Vasilyev (Russia) Nikolai Fomenko	Porsche 3.6L Flat-6	Y	–

† – #1 Lister Storm Racing was disqualified for failing post-race technical inspection. The car was found to have an illegal airbox, possibly due to in-race damage sustained during their pit-stop.

== Statistics ==
- Pole position – #5 Team Rafanelli – 1:30.994
- Fastest lap – #3 Team Carsport Holland – 1:31.348
- Average speed – 146.930 km/h

FIA GT Championship
Previous race: 2001 FIA GT Silverstone 500km	2001 season	Next race: 2001 FIA GT Budapest 500km
