= 1994 British Touring Car Championship =

37th season of the British Touring Car Championship

1994 BTCC season

Seasons
- ← 1993 1995 →

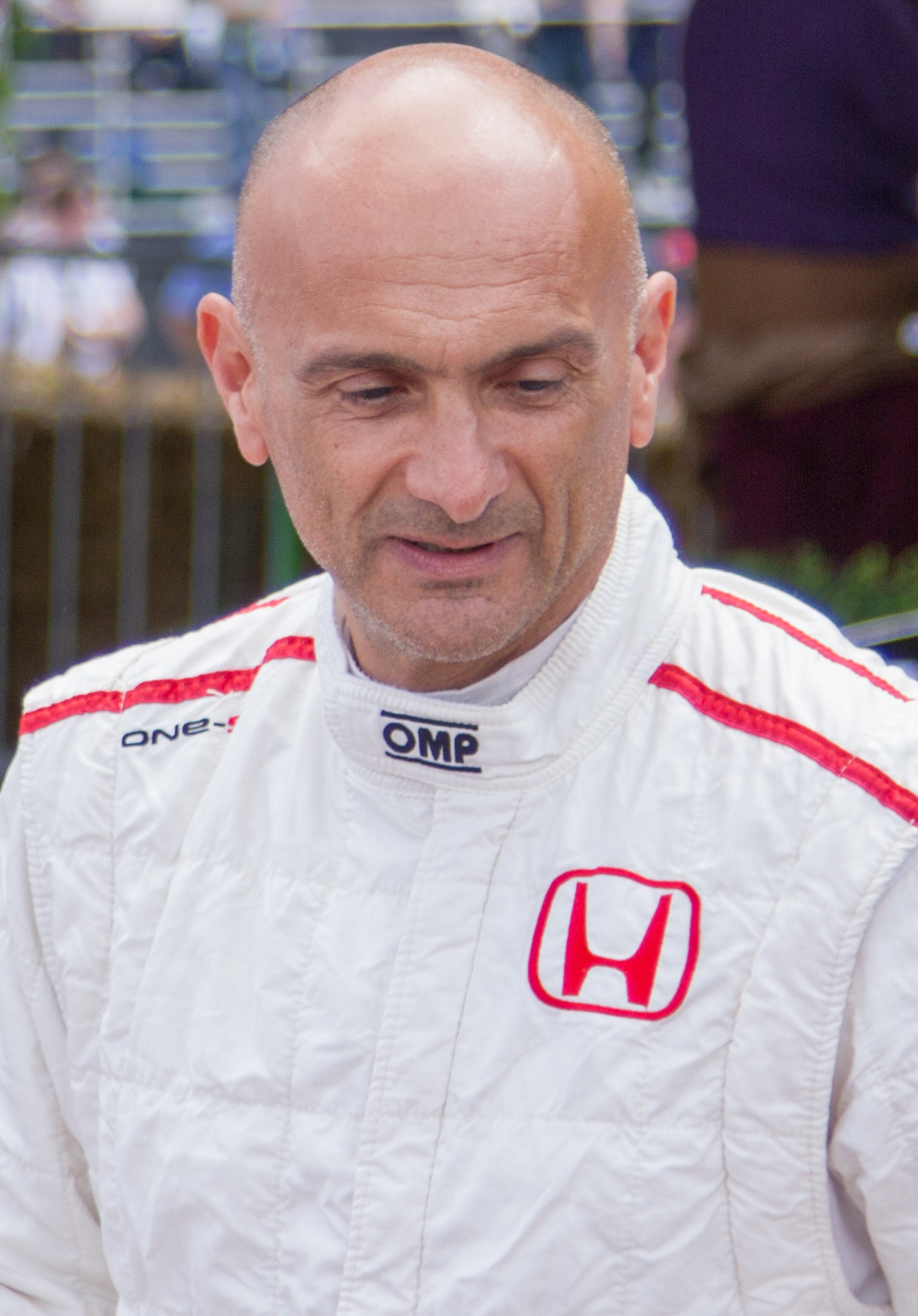
Gabriele Tarquini, the 1994 British Touring Car Champion.

The 1994 Auto Trader RAC British Touring Car Championship season was the 37th British Touring Car Championship (BTCC) season.

== Changes for 1994 ==
- The number of double header meetings were increased from three to eight
- Double headers now awarded full points in both races instead of half, as had previously been the case

== Season summary ==
The lead up to the 1994 season saw both consolidation and major news amongst the manufacturers. Reigning champions BMW retained Joachim Winkelhock and Steve Soper, and the team would again be managed by works outfit Schnitzer Motorsport. Soper however would miss some races when they clashed with his JTCC programme; his place would then be taken by Roberto Ravaglia.

Ford were looking to build on their late 1993 success with Paul Radisich and Andy Rouse. Vauxhall retained drivers John Cleland and Jeff Allam, but handed over the running of their works team to Ray Mallock Ltd., who had previously run semi-works cars as Ecurie Ecosse.

Renault also retained their drivers Alain Menu and Tim Harvey, but replaced their Renault 19 with more modern Lagunas. Toyota added Tim Sugden to their 1993 drivers Will Hoy and Julian Bailey. Keith O’Dor continued with Nissan but was joined by ex-Formula One driver Eric van de Poele, who replaced Win Percy.

Patrick Watts moved from Mazda to Peugeot, replacing Robb Gravett, while Mazda expanded to a two-car line up with drivers Matt Neal and David Leslie. Mazda however would not see out the season. A collision between both drivers at the first Silverstone meeting of the season resulted in Neal spectacularly barrel rolling down the circuit several times, writing off his Xedos 6 car in the process. Neal would not drive again that year as the team could not afford to provide a replacement car. Mazda subsequently soldiered on for a further three meetings with Leslie as their sole entry, before finally running out of money and withdrawing from the championship just before the Knockhill meeting.

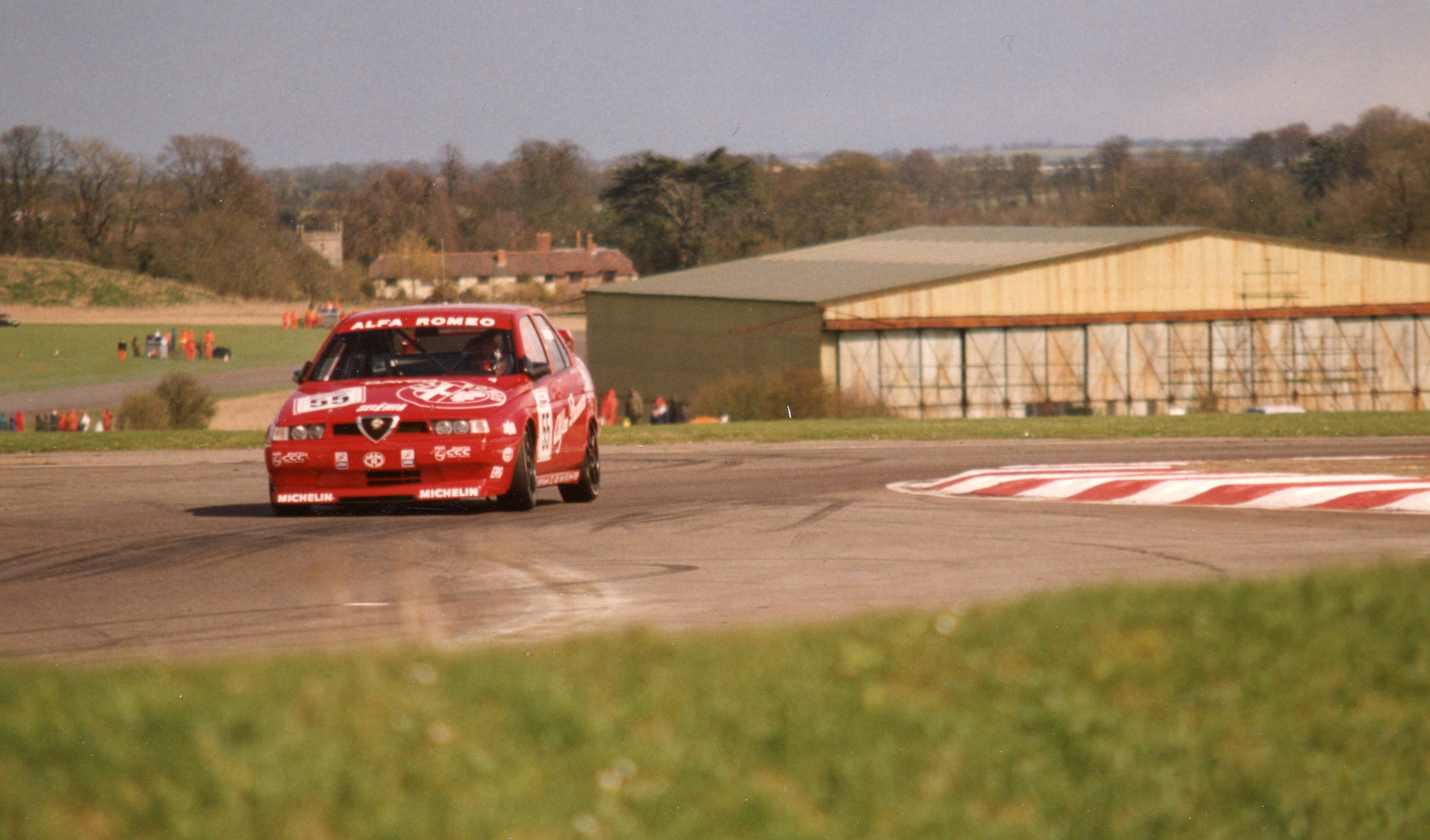
Gabriele Tarquini with Alfa Romeo 155 in Thruxton.

Two new manufacturers joined the championship. Tom Walkinshaw made a comeback with Volvo, the Swedish manufacturer surprisingly choosing to run the estate version of their 850 model. 1988 Le Mans winner Jan Lammers and Swedish Formula Three racer Rickard Rydell would be the team’s two drivers.

Alfa Romeo was the other manufacturer to join; Italian works outfit Alfa Corse would run two cars for Gabriele Tarquini and Giampiero Simoni. Alfa was to revolutionize Super Touring racing, as they produced a unique homologation special version of their 155 model complete with wings and spoilers, significantly improving the aerodynamics of the car. The rules stated that aerodynamic wings could be used provided they were fitted to a limited number of road cars. Peugeot, Ford and Toyota had all run with rear spoilers in previous years due to this. Alfa exploited the rules by releasing a special edition of the 155 called the 'Silverstone' just to gain the aero advantage. Renault and BMW eventually followed suit by releasing limited "homologation special" editions of their cars, the Laguna Airflow and the 318is, respectively.

The start of the season showed that Alfa Romeo had a substantial advantage over their opponents as Gabriele Tarquini dominated, taking the first five wins of the season. Several complaints and protests were lodged by other manufacturers, and just prior to Oulton Park Alfa were told to run without the aerodynamic aids fitted. Alfa refused and left the circuit in protest, allowing Alain Menu to take Renault’s first win of the season.

Eventually matters were resolved and Alfa agreed to return and run with the spoilers lowered, but having lost out on any points from Oulton Park. Even with lowered spoilers, however, Tarquini was able to keep much of his advantage.

Silverstone hosted the twelfth round of the championship, and the rule changes were exploited by other manufacturers to add aerodynamic aids to their own cars. This levelled the playing field considerably and allowed Joachim Winkelhock to make a bid for victory, overtaking Tarquini and winning the race. Tarquini would only win one more race that season, but was always in contention. The Italian secured the title on the penultimate weekend at Silverstone, with a second place in the first race of the day.

The main battle going into the final rounds at Donington Park was for second place between Alain Menu and Paul Radisich. Radisich won the first race of the day bringing him up to level on points with Menu, but mechanical gremlins put a stop to his challenge in the second race. Menu thus finished second in the championship from Radisich, with John Cleland in fourth and Simoni in fifth.

== Teams and drivers ==
=== BTCC ===
| Team | Car | No. | Drivers | Rounds |
Manufacturers
| (Germany) BMW Motorsport Team Schnitzer | BMW 318i | 1 | (Germany) Joachim Winkelhock | All |
| (Germany) BMW Motorsport Team Schnitzer | BMW 318i | 2 | (United Kingdom) Steve Soper | 1–3, 5, 7, 9, 11–13 |
| (Germany) BMW Motorsport Team Schnitzer | BMW 318i | 21 | (Italy) Roberto Ravaglia | 4, 6, 8, 10 |
| (United Kingdom) Team Mondeo | Ford Mondeo Ghia | 3 | (New Zealand) Paul Radisich | All |
| (United Kingdom) Team Mondeo | Ford Mondeo Ghia | 31 | (United Kingdom) Robb Gravett | 13 |
| (United Kingdom) Team Mondeo | Ford Mondeo Ghia | 32 | (United Kingdom) Kelvin Burt | 12 |
| (United Kingdom) Team Mondeo | Ford Mondeo Ghia | 33 | (United Kingdom) Andy Rouse | All |
| (United Kingdom) Vauxhall Sport | Vauxhall Cavalier 16v | 4 | (United Kingdom) John Cleland | All |
| (United Kingdom) Vauxhall Sport | Vauxhall Cavalier 16v | 9 | (United Kingdom) Jeff Allam | All |
| (Japan) Toyota Castrol Team | Toyota Carina E | 5 | (United Kingdom) Julian Bailey | All |
| (Japan) Toyota Castrol Team | Toyota Carina E | 7 | (United Kingdom) Will Hoy | All |
| (Japan) Toyota Castrol Team | Toyota Carina E | 57 | (United Kingdom) Tim Sugden | 2–6, 8, 12–13 |
| (Japan) Team Mazda | Mazda Xedos 6 | 8 | (United Kingdom) David Leslie | 1–8 |
| (Japan) Team Mazda | Mazda Xedos 6 | 12 | (United Kingdom) Matt Neal | 1–4 |
| (France) Renault Dealer Racing | Renault Laguna | 10 | (Switzerland) Alain Menu | All |
| (France) Renault Dealer Racing | Renault Laguna | 11 | (United Kingdom) Tim Harvey | All |
| (France) Peugeot Sport | Peugeot 405 Mi16 | 13 | (United Kingdom) Eugene O'Brien | 1, 3–12 |
| (France) Peugeot Sport | Peugeot 405 Mi16 | 18 | (United Kingdom) Patrick Watts | All |
| (Sweden) Volvo 850 Racing | Volvo 850 SE/GLT | 14 | (Netherlands) Jan Lammers | All |
| (Sweden) Volvo 850 Racing | Volvo 850 SE/GLT | 15 | (Sweden) Rickard Rydell | All |
| (United Kingdom) Old Spice Nissan Racing | Nissan Primera eGT | 23 | (United Kingdom) Kieth O'dor | All |
| (United Kingdom) Old Spice Nissan Racing | Nissan Primera eGT | 24 | (Belgium) Eric van de Poele | 1–8 |
| (United Kingdom) Old Spice Nissan Racing | Nissan Primera eGT | 34 | (United Kingdom) Tiff Needell | 5, 7–13 |
| (Italy) Alfa Corse | Alfa Romeo 155 TS | 55 | (Italy) Gabriele Tarquini | 1–4, 6–13 |
| (Italy) Alfa Corse | Alfa Romeo 155 TS | 56 | (Italy) Giampiero Simoni | 1–4, 6–13 |
Independents
| (United Kingdom) Maxted Motorsport | Vauxhall Cavalier 16v | 17 | (United Kingdom) Ian Khan | 3, 5–7 |
| (United Kingdom) Maxted Motorsport | Toyota Carina E | 17 | (United Kingdom) Ian Khan | 1–2 |
| (United Kingdom) Maxted Motorsport | Toyota Carina E | 29 | (United Kingdom) James Kaye | All |
| (United Kingdom) Woodkirk Peugeot | Peugeot 405 Mi16 | 19 | (United Kingdom) James Thompson | 1–4, 7–13 |
| SuperPower | Peugeot 405 Mi16 | 20 | (United Kingdom) Ian Flux | None |
| (United Kingdom) Geoff Steel Racing | BMW 318is | 22 | (United Kingdom) Geoff Steel | 1–3, 5–6, 10–11 |
| (United Kingdom) Team HMSO Cavalier | Vauxhall Cavalier 16v | 25 | (United Kingdom) Nigel Smith | All |
| (United Kingdom) Hamish Irvine | BMW 318is | 26 | (United Kingdom) Hamish Irvine | 4–13 |
| (United Kingdom) Harlow Motorsport | Renault 19 16v | 27 | (United Kingdom) Nigel Albon | All |
| (United Kingdom) Roy Kennedy Racing | Vauxhall Cavalier 16v | 30 | (United Kingdom) Chris Goodwin | 2–8, 10–13 |

- Ian Flux appeared on the official entry list but never raced.

=== ToCA Shoot Out ===
| Team | Car | No. | Drivers |
Manufacturers
| (Italy) Alfa Corse | Alfa Romeo 155 TS | 1 | (Italy) Gabriele Tarquini |
| (Italy) Alfa Corse | Alfa Romeo 155 TS | 5 | (Italy) Giampiero Simoni |
| (United Kingdom) Team Mondeo | Ford Mondeo Ghia | 3 | (New Zealand) Paul Radisich |
| (United Kingdom) Team Mondeo | Ford Mondeo Ghia | 31 | (United Kingdom) Robb Gravett |
| (United Kingdom) Vauxhall Sport | Vauxhall Cavalier 16v | 4 | (United Kingdom) John Cleland |
| (United Kingdom) Vauxhall Sport | Vauxhall Cavalier 16v | 10 | (United Kingdom) Jeff Allam |
| (United Kingdom) Vauxhall Sport | Vauxhall Cavalier 16v | 20 | (United Kingdom) Anthony Reid |
| (Germany) BMW Motorsport Team Schnitzer | BMW 318i | 6 | (United Kingdom) Steve Soper |
| (France) Peugeot Sport | Peugeot 405 Mi16 | 8 | (United Kingdom) Patrick Watts |
| (France) Peugeot Sport | Peugeot 405 Mi16 | 18 | (United Kingdom) Eugene O'Brien |
| (United Kingdom) Old Spice Nissan Racing | Nissan Primera eGT | 22 | (United Kingdom) Tiff Needell |
| (Japan) Team Mazda | Mazda 323F | 24 | (United Kingdom) Matt Neal |
Independents
| (United Kingdom) Team HMSO Cavalier | Vauxhall Cavalier 16v | 25 | (United Kingdom) Nigel Smith |
| (United Kingdom) Maxted Motorsport | Toyota Carina E | 29 | (United Kingdom) James Kaye |
| (United Kingdom) Roy Kennedy Racing | Vauxhall Cavalier 16v | 30 | (United Kingdom) Julian Westwood |

== Race calendar and winners ==
All races were held in the United Kingdom.

| Round | | Circuit | Date | Pole position | Fastest lap | Winning driver | Winning team | Winning privateer |
|---|---|---|---|---|---|---|---|---|
| 1 | R1 | Thruxton Circuit, Hampshire | 4 April | (Italy) Gabriele Tarquini | (Italy) Gabriele Tarquini | (Italy) Gabriele Tarquini | Alfa Corse | (United Kingdom) James Kaye |
| 2 | R2 | Brands Hatch (Indy), Kent | 17 April | (Italy) Gabriele Tarquini | (Italy) Gabriele Tarquini | (Italy) Gabriele Tarquini | Alfa Corse | (United Kingdom) Nigel Smith |
| 2 | R3 | Brands Hatch (Indy), Kent | 17 April | | (Italy) Giampiero Simoni | (Italy) Gabriele Tarquini | Alfa Corse | (United Kingdom) Chris Goodwin |
| 3 | R4 | Snetterton Motor Racing Circuit, Norfolk | 2 May | (Italy) Giampiero Simoni | (Italy) Gabriele Tarquini | (Italy) Gabriele Tarquini | Alfa Corse | (United Kingdom) James Kaye |
| 4 | R5 | Silverstone Circuit (National), Northamptonshire | 15 May | (Switzerland) Alain Menu | (New Zealand) Paul Radisich | (Italy) Gabriele Tarquini | Alfa Corse | (United Kingdom) Chris Goodwin |
| 4 | R6 | Silverstone Circuit (National), Northamptonshire | 15 May | | (Switzerland) Alain Menu | (New Zealand) Paul Radisich | Team Mondeo | (United Kingdom) James Kaye |
| 5 | R7 | Oulton Park (International), Cheshire | 30 May | (Switzerland) Alain Menu | (Switzerland) Alain Menu | (Switzerland) Alain Menu | Renault Dealer Racing | (United Kingdom) Chris Goodwin |
| 6 | R8 | Donington Park (Grand Prix), Leicestershire | 12 June | (New Zealand) Paul Radisich | (United Kingdom) John Cleland | (United Kingdom) John Cleland | Vauxhall Sport | (United Kingdom) James Kaye |
| 6 | R9 | Donington Park (Grand Prix), Leicestershire | 12 June | | (New Zealand) Paul Radisich | (United Kingdom) John Cleland | Vauxhall Sport | (United Kingdom) James Kaye |
| 7 | R10 | Brands Hatch (Grand Prix), Kent | 26 June | (Italy) Giampiero Simoni | (Italy) Gabriele Tarquini | (Italy) Gabriele Tarquini | Alfa Corse | (United Kingdom) James Kaye |
| 7 | R11 | Brands Hatch (Grand Prix), Kent | 26 June | | (Italy) Gabriele Tarquini | (Italy) Gabriele Tarquini | Alfa Corse | (United Kingdom) James Thompson |
| 8 | R12 | Silverstone Circuit (Grand Prix), Northamptonshire | 10 July | (Germany) Joachim Winkelhock | (Italy) Gabriele Tarquini | (Germany) Joachim Winkelhock | BMW Motorsport Team Schnitzer | (United Kingdom) James Thompson |
| 9 | R13 | Knockhill Racing Circuit, Fife | 31 July | (New Zealand) Paul Radisich | (United Kingdom) Steve Soper | (Switzerland) Alain Menu | Renault Dealer Racing | (United Kingdom) James Kaye |
| 9 | R14 | Knockhill Racing Circuit, Fife | 31 July | | (United Kingdom) Steve Soper | (United Kingdom) Steve Soper | BMW Motorsport Team Schnitzer | (United Kingdom) Nigel Smith |
| 10 | R15 | Oulton Park (International), Cheshire | 14 August | (Switzerland) Alain Menu | (Germany) Joachim Winkelhock | (Germany) Joachim Winkelhock | BMW Motorsport Team Schnitzer | (United Kingdom) Nigel Albon |
| 11 | R16 | Brands Hatch (Indy), Kent | 29 August | (Germany) Joachim Winkelhock | (Germany) Joachim Winkelhock | (Germany) Joachim Winkelhock | BMW Motorsport Team Schnitzer | (United Kingdom) James Kaye |
| 11 | R17 | Brands Hatch (Indy), Kent | 29 August | | (Italy) Gabriele Tarquini | (Germany) Joachim Winkelhock | BMW Motorsport Team Schnitzer | (United Kingdom) Nigel Smith |
| 12 | R18 | Silverstone Circuit (Grand Prix), Northamptonshire | 11 September | (United Kingdom) Tim Harvey | (United Kingdom) Steve Soper | (United Kingdom) Tim Harvey | Renault Dealer Racing | (United Kingdom) Nigel Smith |
| 12 | R19 | Silverstone Circuit (Grand Prix), Northamptonshire | 11 September | | (Italy) Gabriele Tarquini | (Italy) Gabriele Tarquini | Alfa Corse | (United Kingdom) James Kaye |
| 13 | R20 | Donington Park (Grand Prix), Leicestershire | 18 September | (Germany) Joachim Winkelhock | (New Zealand) Paul Radisich | (New Zealand) Paul Radisich | Team Mondeo | (United Kingdom) Chris Goodwin |
| 13 | R21 | Donington Park (Grand Prix), Leicestershire | 18 September | | (New Zealand) Paul Radisich | (Italy) Giampiero Simoni | Alfa Corse | (United Kingdom) James Kaye |

== Championship results ==
=== Drivers Championship ===
(key) (Races in bold indicate pole position; races in italics indicate fastest lap)

Points system
| **1st** | **2nd** | **3rd** | **4th** | **5th** | **6th** | **7th** | **8th** | **9th** | **10th** |
| 24 | 18 | 12 | 10 | 8 | 6 | 4 | 3 | 2 | 1 |

- Race 2 grid for Double Headers are based on Race 1 results.

| Pos | Driver | THR | BRH | | SNE | SIL | | OUL | DON | | BRH | | SIL | KNO | | OUL | BRH | | SIL | | DON | | Pts |
|---|---|---|---|---|---|---|---|---|---|---|---|---|---|---|---|---|---|---|---|---|---|---|---|
| 1 | (Italy) Gabriele Tarquini | **1** | **1** | **1** | 1 | 1 | **DNS** | WD | 3 | DNS | 1 | **1** | 2 | Ret | DNS | 3 | 2 | 2 | 2 | 1 | Ret | 4 | 298 |
| 2 | (Switzerland) Alain Menu | 6 | 18 | Ret | Ret | **3** | 2 | **1** | 5 | 4 | 9 | 6 | 5 | 1 | **3** | **2** | 7 | 7 | 3 | 2 | 2 | 2 | 222 |
| 3 | (New Zealand) Paul Radisich | Ret | 5 | 4 | 2 | 2 | 1 | 2 | **2** | 2 | Ret | Ret | 3 | **2** | 2 | Ret | 14 | DSQ | Ret | DNS | 1 | **9** | 206 |
| 4 | (United Kingdom) John Cleland | 2 | 3 | 2 | Ret | 7 | 4 | 7 | 1 | **1** | 5 | 4 | DNS | 5 | 6 | Ret | Ret | DNS | 4 | 4 | 8 | 5 | 177 |
| 5 | (Italy) Giampiero Simoni | 11 | 2 | DSQ | **3** | Ret | DNS | WD | Ret | DNS | **2** | 2 | Ret | Ret | 9 | 4 | 3 | 3 | 6 | 3 | 3 | 1 | 156 |
| 6 | (Germany) Joachim Winkelhock | 3 | Ret | 7 | Ret | 14 | 14 | 8 | Ret | 8 | 8 | 7 | **1** | Ret | 11 | 1 | **1** | **1** | Ret | DNS | **4** | 3 | 147 |
| 7 | (United Kingdom) Steve Soper | 4 | 10 | 6 | 8 | | | 4 | | | 4 | 14 | | 3 | 1 | | 5 | 4 | 22 | 5 | 12 | Ret | 102 |
| 8 | (United Kingdom) Patrick Watts | 7 | 7 | 8 | 5 | 5 | 3 | 3 | 7 | 11 | 3 | 3 | 6 | 15 | Ret | 8 | 6 | DNS | Ret | Ret | 7 | 11 | 98 |
| 9 | (United Kingdom) Tim Harvey | 10 | Ret | DNS | Ret | Ret | 7 | Ret | 9 | 10 | Ret | 11 | 4 | DSQ | 4 | 6 | 4 | Ret | **1** | **18** | 5 | 8 | 79 |
| 10 | (United Kingdom) Jeff Allam | 14 | 6 | 5 | 6 | 12 | 9 | 6 | 6 | 3 | 19 | 10 | 7 | 4 | 5 | 12 | 13 | Ret | 8 | 9 | 9 | 13 | 76 |
| 11 | (United Kingdom) Andy Rouse | 21 | 4 | 3 | DNS | 4 | 19 | Ret | 4 | 6 | 6 | 5 | Ret | 11 | 15 | Ret | 11 | DNS | 13 | 8 | 20 | 10 | 66 |
| 12 | (United Kingdom) Julian Bailey | 20 | 19 | 10 | Ret | 10 | 5 | 10 | 8 | 5 | 11 | 9 | DNS | 8 | 7 | 9 | 10 | 6 | 5 | 6 | 6 | 6 | 66 |
| 13 | (United Kingdom) Will Hoy | 5 | 9 | 9 | 12 | 6 | 6 | Ret | 10 | 7 | Ret | 17 | 9 | 9 | 8 | 11 | 12 | DNS | 7 | 7 | 18 | 7 | 48 |
| 14 | (Sweden) Rickard Rydell | 15 | 22 | 15 | Ret | 19 | 13 | 5 | 11 | Ret | 10 | 8 | 8 | 6 | 10 | Ret | 15 | 8 | 10 | 12 | 10 | 12 | 27 |
| 15 | (Netherlands) Jan Lammers | Ret | 12 | 16 | 11 | Ret | 16 | 13 | 14 | 15 | 7 | 16 | 12 | NC | 12 | 7 | 9 | 5 | 16 | 17 | 13 | 16 | 18 |
| 16 | (United Kingdom) Kieth O'Dor | 9 | 11 | Ret | 4 | 8 | DNS | 11 | 13 | 12 | 12 | 13 | DNS | 14 | 14 | 10 | 16 | DNS | 11 | Ret | 22 | 18 | 16 |
| 17 | (United Kingdom) Eugene O'Brien | Ret | | | 7 | 11 | 10 | 9 | 16 | 20 | 13 | Ret | Ret | 7 | 13 | 14 | 8 | Ret | 12 | Ret | | | 14 |
| 18 | (Italy) Roberto Ravaglia | | | | | Ret | Ret | | 12 | 9 | | | Ret | | | 5 | | | | | | | 10 |
| 19 | (United Kingdom) Tim Sugden | | 20 | 12 | Ret | 9 | 7 | 12 | 15 | 14 | | | Ret | | | | | | 9 | 10 | 19 | 14 | 9 |
| 20 | (United Kingdom) David Leslie | 8 | 8 | 11 | 17 | 16 | 11 | Ret | Ret | DNS | Ret | 19 | 11 | | | | | | | | | | 6 |
| 21 | (United Kingdom) Tiff Needell | | | | | | | 17 | | | Ret | 18 | DNS | 10 | 16 | 13 | 17 | 9 | 15 | 14 | 15 | 15 | 3 |
| 22 | (Belgium) Eric van de Poele | 13 | DNS | DNS | 9 | 13 | 12 | 14 | 17 | 13 | 14 | 12 | DNS | | | | | | | | | | 2 |
| 23 | (United Kingdom) Matt Neal | 12 | 15 | 17 | 10 | 15 | DNS | | | | | | | | | | | | | | | | 1 |
| 24 | (United Kingdom) James Thompson | Ret | 16 | 18 | Ret | 21 | DNS | | | | 18 | 15 | 10 | Ret | DNS | Ret | 20 | Ret | 18 | Ret | 16 | 19 | 1 |
| 25 | (United Kingdom) Nigel Smith | 18 | 13 | 14 | 15 | 20 | Ret | 16 | 20 | 18 | 16 | 20 | 13 | Ret | 17 | 17 | 19 | 10 | 17 | 16 | 23 | 20 | 1 |
| 26 | (United Kingdom) Chris Goodwin | | 14 | 13 | 14 | 17 | 17 | 15 | 19 | 17 | 17 | Ret | DNS | | | 18 | 22 | 11 | 19 | 15 | 14 | 21 | 0 |
| 27 | (United Kingdom) Kelvin Burt | | | | | | | | | | | | | | | | | | 14 | 11 | | | 0 |
| 28 | (United Kingdom) Robb Gravett | | | | | | | | | | | | | | | | | | | | 11 | Ret | 0 |
| 29 | (United Kingdom) James Kaye | 16 | 17 | 19 | 13 | 18 | 15 | Ret | 18 | 16 | 15 | 21 | 15 | 12 | 18 | Ret | 18 | Ret | 20 | 13 | 17 | 17 | 0 |
| 30 | (United Kingdom) Nigel Albon | 17 | Ret | DNS | 16 | 22 | 18 | DNS | 22 | Ret | DNS | DNS | Ret | Ret | DNS | 15 | Ret | 12 | 21 | DNS | Ret | 22 | 0 |
| 31 | (United Kingdom) Hamish Irvine | | | | | 23 | 20 | Ret | 23 | Ret | 21 | Ret | 14 | 13 | Ret | 16 | 21 | DNS | 23 | DNS | 21 | 23 | 0 |
| 32 | (United Kingdom) Geoff Steel | 22 | 21 | 20 | 18 | | | 18 | 24 | 21 | | | | | | Ret | 23 | 13 | | | | | 0 |
| 33 | (United Kingdom) Ian Khan | 19 | DNS | DNS | Ret | | | Ret | 21 | 19 | 20 | 22 | | | | | | | | | | | 0 |
| Pos | Driver | THR | BRH | | SNE | SIL | | OUL | DON | | BRH | | SIL | KNO | | OUL | BRH | | SIL | | DON | | Pts |

=== Privateers Championship ===
| Pos | Driver | THR | BRH | | SNE | SIL | | OUL | DON | | BRH | | SIL | KNO | | OUL | BRH | | SIL | | DON | | Pts |
|---|---|---|---|---|---|---|---|---|---|---|---|---|---|---|---|---|---|---|---|---|---|---|---|
| 1 | (United Kingdom) James Kaye | 16 | 17 | 19 | 13 | **18** | 15 | **Ret** | **18** | **16** | 15 | **21** | **15** | 12 | **18** | Ret | 18 | **Ret** | 20 | 13 | 17 | 17 | 340 |
| 2 | (United Kingdom) Nigel Smith | 18 | **13** | **14** | 15 | 20 | Ret | 16 | 20 | 18 | 16 | 20 | 13 | Ret | 17 | 17 | 19 | 10 | 17 | **16** | 23 | 20 | 308 |
| 3 | (United Kingdom) Chris Goodwin | | 14 | 13 | 14 | 17 | **17** | 15 | 19 | 17 | 17 | Ret | DNS | | | 18 | 22 | 11 | **19** | 15 | **14** | **21** | 274 |
| 4 | (United Kingdom) James Thompson | **Ret** | 16 | 18 | **Ret** | 21 | DNS | | | | **18** | 15 | 10 | **Ret** | DNS | **Ret** | **20** | Ret | 18 | Ret | 16 | 19 | 158 |
| 5 | (United Kingdom) Nigel Albon | 17 | Ret | DNS | 16 | 22 | 18 | DNS | 22 | Ret | DNS | DNS | Ret | Ret | DNS | 15 | Ret | 12 | 21 | DNS | Ret | 22 | 108 |
| 6 | (United Kingdom) Hamish Irvine | | | | | 23 | 20 | Ret | 23 | Ret | 21 | Ret | 14 | 13 | Ret | 16 | 21 | DNS | 23 | DNS | 21 | 23 | 108 |
| 7 | (United Kingdom) Geoff Steel | 22 | 21 | 20 | 18 | | | 18 | 24 | 21 | | | | | | Ret | 23 | 13 | | | | | 72 |
| 8 | (United Kingdom) Ian Khan | 19 | DNS | DNS | Ret | | | Ret | 21 | 19 | 20 | 22 | | | | | | | | | | | 48 |
| Pos | Driver | THR | BRH | | SNE | SIL | | OUL | DON | | BRH | | SIL | KNO | | OUL | BRH | | SIL | | DON | | Pts |

=== Manufacturers Championship ===
| Pos | Manufacturer | THR | BRH | | SNE | SIL | | OUL | DON | | BRH | | SIL | KNO | | OUL | BRH | | SIL | | DON | | Pts |
|---|---|---|---|---|---|---|---|---|---|---|---|---|---|---|---|---|---|---|---|---|---|---|---|
| 1 | Alfa Romeo / Alfa Corse | 1 | 1 | 1 | 1 | 1 | DNS | WD | 3 | DNS | 1 | 1 | 2 | Ret | 9 | 3 | 2 | 2 | 2 | 1 | 3 | 1 | 330 |
| 2 | Renault / Renault Dealer Racing | 6 | 18 | Ret | Ret | 3 | 2 | 1 | 5 | 4 | 9 | 6 | 4 | 1 | 3 | 2 | 4 | 7 | 1 | 2 | 2 | 2 | 259 |
| 3 | Ford / Team Mondeo | 21 | 4 | 3 | 2 | 2 | 1 | 2 | 2 | 2 | 6 | 5 | 3 | 2 | 2 | Ret | 11 | DSQ | 13 | 8 | 1 | 9 | 248 |
| 4 | BMW / BMW Motorsport Team Schnitzer | 3 | 10 | 6 | 8 | 14 | 14 | 4 | 12 | 8 | 4 | 7 | 1 | 3 | 1 | 1 | 1 | 1 | 22 | 5 | 4 | 3 | 242 |
| 5 | Vauxhall / Vauxhall Motorsport | 2 | 3 | 2 | 6 | 7 | 4 | 6 | 1 | 1 | 5 | 4 | 7 | 4 | 5 | 12 | 13 | Ret | 4 | 4 | 8 | 5 | 224 |
| 6 | Peugeot / Peugeot Sport | 7 | 7 | 8 | 5 | 5 | 3 | 3 | 7 | 11 | 3 | 3 | 6 | 7 | 13 | 8 | 6 | Ret | 12 | Ret | 7 | 11 | 167 |
| 7 | Toyota / Toyota Castrol Team | 5 | 9 | 9 | 12 | 6 | 5 | 10 | 8 | 5 | 11 | 9 | 9 | 8 | 7 | 9 | 10 | 6 | 5 | 6 | 6 | 6 | 137 |
| 8 | Volvo / Volvo 850 Racing | 15 | 12 | 15 | 11 | 19 | 13 | 5 | 11 | 15 | 7 | 8 | 8 | 6 | 10 | 7 | 9 | 5 | 10 | 12 | 10 | 12 | 103 |
| 9 | Nissan / Old Spice Nissan Racing | 9 | 11 | Ret | 4 | 8 | 12 | 11 | 13 | 12 | 12 | 12 | DNS | 10 | 14 | 10 | 16 | 9 | 11 | 14 | 15 | 15 | 69 |
| 10 | Mazda / Team Mazda | 8 | 8 | 11 | 10 | 15 | 11 | Ret | Ret | DNS | Ret | 19 | 11 | | | | | | | | | | 31 |
| Pos | Driver | THR | BRH | | SNE | SIL | | OUL | DON | | BRH | | SIL | KNO | | OUL | BRH | | SIL | | DON | | Pts |
