= Alan Heaphy =

Australian motorsport team manager

Personal information
- Nationality: Australian

Sport
- Country: Australia
- Sport: European Touring Car Championship; World Sportscar Championship; Australian Touring Car racing British Touring Car Championship; V8 Supercars; Australian Rally Championship; Group 3E Series Production Cars
- Team: Nismo; Gibson Motorsport; Janspeed; Wayne Gardner Racing; John Briggs Motorsport; Mitsubishi Ralliart

Alan Heaphy is an Australian motorsport team manager.

== Career ==
Alan Heaphy started his career as a mechanic in rallying, later moving to England. He then moved to Nismo working on its European Touring Car Championship campaign in 1988 with Allan Grice and Win Percy and World Sportscar Championship program. In the early 1990s he returned to Australia to manage Gibson Motorsport.

After working for Janspeed on Nissan's 1993 British Touring Car Championship campaign, Heaphy returned to Australia to manage Wayne Gardner Racing. Upon its closure at the end of 1997, he returned to Gibson Motorsport in 1998 managing the team until Fred Gibson sold it at the end of 1999.

After consulting to John Briggs Motorsport in 2000, he rejoined Gibson Motorsport in 2001, managing it until the team closed in 2003. He then moved to work on Mitsubishi's Australian Rally Championship and Production Car programs winning the 2009 WPS Bathurst 12 Hour.

In 2013, Heaphy reunited with Fred Gibson to reform Gibson Motorsport as a race car preparer for cars participating in the Heritage Touring Cars series. Amongst its clients are the owners of former Gibson Motorsport Nissans. In 2014, he managed Abarth's Bathurst 12 hour campaign.
