= Kieth O'dor =

British racing driver (1962–1995)

- Nationality: (United Kingdom) British
- Born: 5 April 1962 Salisbury, Wiltshire, United Kingdom
- Died: 11 September 1995 (aged 33) Berlin, Germany

British Touring Car Championship
- Years active: 1991–1994
- Teams: Janspeed Racing
- Starts: 63
- Wins: 1
- Poles: 1
- Fastest laps: 1
- Best finish: 6th in 1993

Kieth O'dor (5 April 1962 – 11 September 1995) was a British racing driver, born in Salisbury, who competed primarily in touring cars. He scored Nissan's first win during the super touring era in both the British Touring Car Championship and the Super Tourenwagen Cup. He was killed during a race at the AVUS circuit in Berlin.

== Background and early life ==
O'dor was born in Salisbury, Wiltshire, in the United Kingdom, on 5 April 1962, and was the son of János Ódor who emigrated from Hungary to the United Kingdom after the Soviet invasion in 1956. He founded the Janspeed automotive engineering company and racing team.

O'dor raced under the surname O'dor or Odor (changing from one spelling to another from year to year).

O'dor was married to Anita Blandford.

== Early career and British touring cars ==
O'dor started out in rallying during the mid-1980s before switching to circuit racing, winning his class in the British Production Saloon Car Championship in 1987 driving a Peugeot 205. He won the overall championship in 1989 driving a Ford Sierra. In 1990, he won the Group N Production Championship driving a Nissan Skyline GT-R prepared by his father's Janspeed outfit.

The following year, O'dor moved up to the British Touring Car Championship, again with his father's Janspeed team, driving a manufacturer-backed Nissan Primera. He continued to drive for the team in 1992 and then enjoyed a competitive 1993 with improving results including his first pole position, podium and then securing Nissan's first BTCC win of the super touring era at the high profile Formula One grand prix support race on the Silverstone GP circuit eventually finishing sixth overall in the standings.

O'dor continued with the team in 1994 but the Nissan was not nearly as competitive, a fourth place at Snetterton early in the season the only time the car showed any real pace. After only scoring a handful more points during the season Nissan decided to call time on the BTCC program.

== Death ==
Following Nissan's withdrawal from the BTCC, O'dor switched to the German ADAC Super Tourenwagen Cup driving for the Nissan-backed BMS Scuderia Italia in a year-old Primera. Although the Nissan was not the most competitive car, O'dor was a regular top-ten finisher and had the measure of his teammates. He scored his and Nissan's first victory in the championship at the first race of the double-header meeting at AVUS, defeating eventual champion Joachim Winkelhock's BMW. In the second race, O'dor was running third behind Winkelhock and Peter Kox when he clipped the barriers and spun in the path of oncoming cars. The close-following Altfrid Heger and Hans-Joachim Stuck managed to avoid him but Frank Biela's Audi crashed heavily into the driver's side of O'dor's car at 118 mph.

Biela quickly extracted himself from his car, but O'dor did not. Rescuers took several minutes to reach him, while cars continued to circulate behind the safety car for several laps. They were unable to open the door of the heavily damaged Nissan and it took half an hour before O'dor could be removed from the car and airlifted to hospital in Berlin. He died in the early hours of the following morning.

== Racing record ==
=== Career history ===
- 1980s – Began career in rallying.
- 1987 – British Production Saloon Car Championship – 2000cc Class Champion (Peugeot 205).
- 1989 – British Production Saloon Champion (Ford Sierra Cosworth).
- 1990 – British Group N Saloon Champion (Nissan Skyline GT-R).
- 1991 – BTCC – 17th in points (Nissan Primera eGT).
- 1992 – BTCC – 12th in points (Nissan Primera eGT).
- 1993 – BTCC – 6th in points, British Grand Prix support race winner (Nissan Primera eGT).
- 1994 – BTCC – 15th in points (Nissan Primera eGT).
- 1995 – German STW Cup – 10th in points, 1 win (Nissan Primera eGT) – Killed in STW race at Avus, Berlin.

=== Complete British Touring Car Championship results ===
(key) (Races in bold indicate pole position) (Races in italics indicate fastest lap)

Year	Team	Car	1	2	3	4	5	6	7	8	9	10	11	12	13	14	15	16	17	18	19	20	21	DC	Pts
1991	Nissan Janspeed Racing	Nissan Primera eGT	SIL	SNE; Ret	DON; Ret	THR; 11	SIL; 13^{1}	BRH; 15	SIL; Ret	DON; 1; 10	DON; 2; 8	OUL; 10	BRH; 1 Ret	BRH; 2 Ret	DON; 9	THR; 6	SIL; 11							**17th**	**10**
1992	Nissan Janspeed Racing	Nissan Primera eGT	SIL; 6	THR; 15	OUL; 12	SNE; Ret	BRH; 7	DON; 1; 16	DON; 2; 8	SIL; 10	KNO; 1; 10	KNO; 2; 7	PEM; 9	BRH; 1; 10	BRH; 2; 8	DON; Ret	SIL; Ret							**12th**	**17**
1993	Nissan Castrol Racing	Nissan Primera eGT	SIL; Ret	DON; 5	SNE; DNS	DON; 9	OUL; 4	BRH; 1; 2	BRH; 2; 2	PEM; 5	**SIL**; 1	KNO; 1; 7	KNO; 2; 11	OUL; 10	BRH; 5	THR; 11	DON; 1; 8	DON; 2; 11	SIL; 11					**6th**	**82**
1994	Old Spice Nissan Racing	Nissan Primera eGT	THR; 9	BRH; 1; 11	BRH; 2 Ret	SNE; 4	SIL; 1; 8	SIL; 2 DNS	OUL; 11	DON; 1; 13	DON; 2; 12	BRH; 1; 12	BRH; 2; 13	SIL; DNS	KNO; 1; 14	KNO; 2; 14	OUL; 10	BRH; 1; 16	BRH; 2 DNS	SIL; 1; 11	SIL; 2 Ret	DON; 1; 22	DON; 2; 18	**16th**	**16**
Sources:

1. – Race was stopped due to heavy rain. No points were awarded.

=== Complete Super Tourenwagen Cup results ===
(key) (Races in bold indicate pole position) (Races in italics indicate fastest lap)

Year	Team	Car	1	2	3	4	5	6	7	8	9	10	11	12	13	14	15	16	Pos.	Pts
1995	Nissan Primera Racing	Nissan Primera eGT	ZOL; 1; 9	ZOL; 2; 7	SPA; 1; 10	SPA; 2; 9	ÖST; 1; 12	ÖST; 2; 7	HOC; 1; 8	HOC; 2; 7	NÜR; 1; 6	NÜR; 2; 5	SAL; 1 Ret	SAL; 2 DNS	AVU; 1; 1	AVU; 2; 16†	NÜR; 1	NÜR; 2	10th	225

† Drivers did not finish the race, but were classified as they completed over 90% of the race distance.
