= Nigel Albon =

British racing driver (born 1957)

- Nationality: (United Kingdom) British
- Relatives: Alex Albon (son); Mark Albon (brother)

Previous series
- 2005-2007; 2003; 2001; 1994; 1993: Porsche Carrera Cup Asia; Porsche Carrera Cup Asia; FIA GT Championship; British Touring Car Championship; Renault Clio Cup

Nigel Peter Albon (born 8 February 1957) is a British racing driver. He most recently competed in the Porsche Carrera Cup Asia between 2005 and 2007. His son Alex is also a racing driver, who has competed in Formula One since 2019.

== Racing career ==
In 1993, Albon raced in the Renault Clio Cup, finishing the year fifth on points. During the 1994 British Touring Car Championship (BTCC) he raced a Renault 19 for Harlow Motorsport in the Total Independents Cup coming equal fifth with 108 points. Albon returned to racing in 2001, driving one race of the FIA GT Championship for the Gamon Porsche team. In 2002, he won the Sepang 12 Hours for Jaseri Racing, alongside Tunku Hammam and Tommy Lee driving a Porsche 911 GT3 Cup. The following year, he remained with the same team moving into the Porsche Carrera Cup Asia. He would win three races, and finish second in the championship. After going on a hiatus in 2004, Albon returned to the series in 2005 where he remained until the end of the 2007 season. His 996 model GT3 Cup car was sold in 2023.

== Personal life ==
Albon's brother, Mark, is also a racing driver. His son, Alex, has been a Formula One driver since 2019 racing for Toro Rosso, Red Bull and Williams. He previously finished third in the 2018 FIA Formula 2 Championship, and won the junior Karting World Cup and European Championship in 2010.

His former wife, and Alex's mother, Kankamol, was sentenced to six-years imprisonment in 2013 for operating a Ponzi scheme selling luxury vehicles. Her assets were seized and sold, including a property in Essex and handbags from Chanel and Mulberry, to pay back a £1.8million HMRC bill.

He resides in Malaysia as of 2026.

== Racing record ==
=== Complete British Touring Car Championship results ===
(key) (Races in bold indicate pole position) (Races in italics indicate fastest lap)

Year	Team	Car	1	2	3	4	5	6	7	8	9	10	11	12	13	14	15	16	17	18	19	20	21	DC	Pts
1994	Harlow Motorsport	Renault 19 16v	THR; 17	BRH; 1 Ret	BRH; 2 DNS	SNE; 16	SIL; 1; 22	SIL; 2; 18	OUL	DON; 1; 22	DON; 2 Ret	BRH; 1 DNS	BRH; 2 DNS	SIL; Ret	KNO; 1 Ret	KNO; 2 DNS	OUL; 15	BRH; 1 Ret	BRH; 2; 12	SIL; 1; 21	SIL; 2 DNS	DON; 1 Ret	DON; 2; 22	**30th**	**0**

=== Complete FIA GT Championship results ===
(key) (Races in bold indicate pole position) (Races in italics indicate fastest lap)

Pos.	Driver	Team	MON (Italy)	BRN (Czech Republic)	MAG (France)	SIL (United Kingdom)	ZOL (Belgium)	HUN (Hungary)	SPA (Belgium)	A1R (Austria)	NUR (Germany)	JAR (Spain)	EST (Portugal)	Total points
NC	(United Kingdom) Nigel Albon	(China) Gammon Megaspeed					17							**0**
