= Eugene O'Brien (racing driver) =

British racing driver (born 1960)

- Nationality: (United Kingdom) British
- Born: 22 March 1960 (age 66) Luton, Bedfordshire, United Kingdom

British Touring Car Championship
- Years active: 1993–1994
- Teams: Peugeot Sport
- Starts: 34
- Wins: 0
- Poles: 0
- Fastest laps: 0
- Best finish: 16th in 1993

Eugene O'Brien (born 22 March 1960) is a British racing driver and professional driver coach.

== Career ==
=== Formula Ford ===
With an engineering degree from Cambridge and a graduate apprenticeship with Rolls-Royce Motors under his belt, O'Brien started his racing career in single-seaters, winning his first Formula Ford 1600 race in 1983. After finishing third in the Junior Formula Ford Series in 1983, he focused on the engineering and setup of racing cars and racing trucks whilst he raised the funds for the next stage of his racing career.

=== Formula First ===
In 1987, O'Brien completed a full season in Formula First, where he finished the year as runner-up.

=== Formula Vauxhall Lotus ===
O'Brien switched to the Formula Vauxhall Lotus single seaters in 1988, ending his second year in the championship as runner-up.

=== British Sports 2000 and Formula Forward ===
Eugene's first championship title came in 1990 with the British Sports 2000 Championship and his second championship title came in 1992, winning the Formula Forward single seater series with ten pole positions, ten fastest laps and ten race wins.

=== British Touring Car Championship ===
O'Brien's success earned him a drive in the British Touring Car Championship for the 1993 season. Driving for the newly formed, factory based works Peugeot team, he competed for two seasons in the series, working with the factory race engineers to develop the Peugeot 405 touring car and finishing sixteenth.

In 1996, O'Brien made a brief return to Touring Car Racing in the Malaysian Touring Car Cup and the RAC Tourist Trophy (He finished eighth out of nine finishers in the latter). He drove a YAP Motorsport Honda Accord, with which he intended to return to the BTCC in 1997, but this plan fell through.

=== One-Make Racing ===
O'Brien raced in the 1996 Dunlop Rover Turbo Cup and won at Castle Combe. He ranked third overall.

=== Endurance Racing ===
O'Brien competed in the 1993 Willhire 24 Hour race at Snetterton. He shared a Peugeot 106 with Joel Wykeham and former Olympic decathlete Daley Thompson.

After leaving the BTCC, O'Brien drove a Callaway Corvette with fellow ex-BTCC driver Robin Donovan and Riccardo Agusta in the 24 Hours of Le Mans in 1995, finishing third in the GT2 Class and 11th outright.

=== After Racing ===
Turning from full time professional racing, O'Brien has set up and run teams in Formula 4 and the Volkswagen Fun Cup, combining race car engineering with driver coaching. He occasional races in machinery himself, such as with the Citroen 2CVs and TVR Griffiths. O'Brien worked with his long time motor racing mentor, Richard Usher, on the track design for Blyton Park in Lincolnshire, which Richard opened as a Sprint, Trackdays and Driving Experiences Centre in 2011.

With his experience of different cars and classes, as well as all the UK race tracks and many European circuits, O'Brien is now focused on driver development and coaching, where his clients have ranged from historic racers to Ginetta Juniors.

== Racing record ==
=== Complete British Touring Car Championship results ===
(key) (Races in bold indicate pole position) (Races in italics indicate fastest lap)

Year	Team	Car	1	2	3	4	5	6	7	8	9	10	11	12	13	14	15	16	17	18	19	20	21	DC	Pts
1993	Peugeot Talbot Sport	Peugeot 405 Mi16	SIL; Ret	DON; Ret	SNE; 13	DON; Ret	OUL; 5	BRH; 1; 12	BRH; 2; 11	PEM; Ret	SIL; Ret	KNO; 1; 8	KNO; 2 Ret	OUL; 9	BRH; 10	THR; 5	DON; 1; 6	DON; 2; 15	SIL; Ret					**16th**	**23**
1994	Peugeot Sport	Peugeot 405 Mi16	THR; Ret	BRH; 1	BRH; 2	SNE; 7	SIL; 1; 11	SIL; 2; 10	OUL; 9	DON; 1; 16	DON; 2; 20	BRH; 1; 13	BRH; 2 Ret	SIL; Ret	KNO; 1; 7	KNO; 2; 13	OUL; 14	BRH; 1; 8	BRH; 2 Ret	SIL; 1; 12	SIL; 2 Ret	DON; 1	DON; 2	**17th**	**14**
