= Ian Khan =

British racing driver (1960–2025)

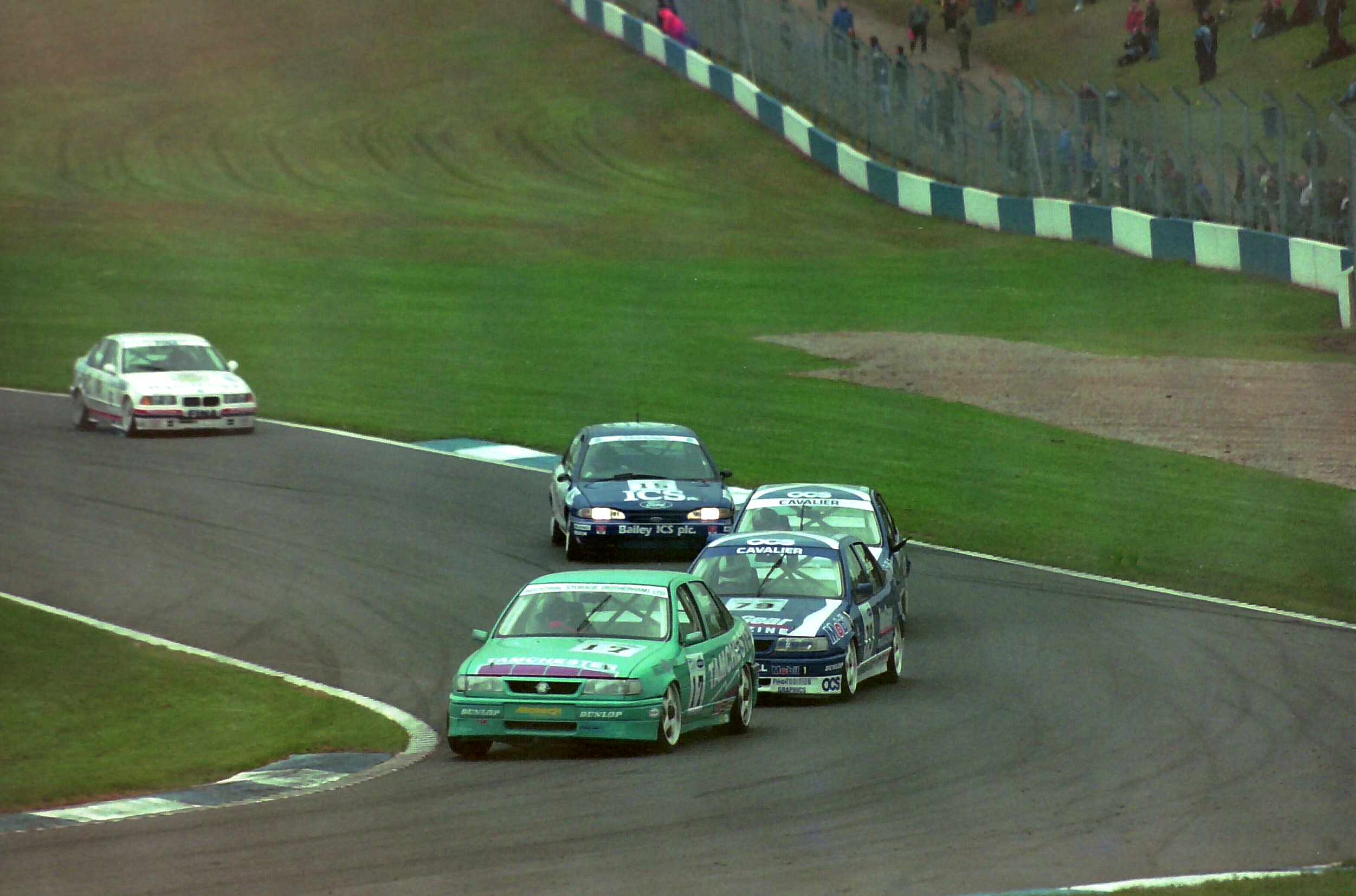
- Khan, Vauxhall Cavalier, leading through the Old Hairpin at the 1993 TOCA Shootout, Donington
- Nationality: (United Kingdom) British
- Born: 12 May 1960 Fulham, London, England
- Died: 6 July 2025 (aged 65) Saint-Paul-de-Vence, France

British Touring Car Championship
- Years active: 1993–1994
- Teams: Maxted Motorsport
- Starts: 22
- Wins: 0
- Poles: 0
- Fastest laps: 0
- Best finish: 24th in 1993

Ian Tarik Khan (12 May 1960 – 6 July 2025) was a British racing driver who took part in the FIA GT and FIA GT3 Championships, as well as the British Touring Car Championship.

== Biography ==
In 1992, Khan won the BRDC British Saloon Car Championship. The year after, he continued to the British Touring Car Championship in a Vauxhall Cavalier, his most notable performance coming in the season-ending TOCA Shootout at Donington Park where he led for several laps thanks to the reverse-grid format. In 1994, he competed again, firstly in a Toyota Carina and then his old Vauxhall for Maxted Motorsport. From 1996, Khan raced in the Ferrari F355 championship and various endurance races. With races in the Renault Clio V6 Trophy between 1999 and 2001, from 2002 he has competed in the FIA GT Championship and the Le Mans 24 Hour. Khan died in Saint-Paul-de-Vence on 6 July 2025, at the age of 65.

== Racing record ==
=== Complete 24 Hours of Spa results ===
Year	Team	Co-Drivers	Car	Class	Laps	Pos.	Class Pos.
1991	(Belgium) R+D Motorsport	(Belgium) Michael Maillien (United Kingdom) Scott Stringfellow	Ford Sierra RS Cosworth	N/Div 4	413	25th	4th
1992	(United Kingdom) Ian Khan	(Belgium) Damien van de Poele (United Kingdom) Scott Stringfellow	BMW M3	N3.0	?/Lighting	DNF	DNF
1995	(United Kingdom) Ian Khan	(Japan) Masahiro Kimoto (Belgium) Dirk Schoysman	Opel Vectra	ST	0/Did not start	DNS	DNS
1997	(Germany) E.B.R.T. Schröder Motorsport	(Netherlands) Stephane van Dyck (Belgium) Michael Luxen	BMW M3	Spa+3.0	424	19th	2nd
1999	(United Kingdom) Speedworks	(Japan) Masahiro Kimoto (Japan) Akira Yoshimoto	Honda Integra Type R	N2.0	273/engine	DNF	DNF
2000	(United Kingdom) Ian Khan	(United Kingdom) Adrian Willmott (United Kingdom) Mark Peters	BMW M3	N	?/out of race	DNF	DNF
2001	(United States) Cirtek Motorsport	(United Kingdom) Peter Hardman (United Kingdom) Adam Jones (United Kingdom) Ian Donaldson (United Kingdom) Gregor Fisken (United Kingdom) Mark Peters (DNS) (United Kingdom) Ian Khan (DNS) (United Kingdom) Andrew Wilmot (DNS)	Porsche 996 GT3 R	Cat.2	210/engine	DNF	DNF
2003	(United Kingdom) Team Eurotech	(Netherlands) Jürgen von Gartzen (United Kingdom) Mark Mayall (United Kingdom) Nigel Smith (United Kingdom) Mike Jordan (DNS) (United Kingdom) Mark Sumpter (DNS)	Porsche 996 GT3-RS	N-GT	455	11th	5th
2005	(United Kingdom) Ian Khan	(France) Paul Belmondo (Belgium) Charles de Pauw (Belgium) Alain Van Der Hover	Porsche 996 GT3-R	G2	2/accident	DNF	DNF
2006	(France) Pouchelon Racing	(United Kingdom) Anthony Reid (Netherlands) Paul van Splunteren (Belgium) Maxime Dumarey	Dodge Viper Competition Coupe	G3	125	DNF	DNF
2007	(Belgium) Mühlner Motorsport	(Netherlands) Paul van Splunteren (Netherlands) Simon Frederiks (Netherlands) Gosse Stielstra	Porsche 997 GT3	G3	475	14th	1st
2008	(Belgium) Mühlner Motorsport	(Netherlands) Duncan Huisman (Netherlands) Paul van Splunteren (Netherlands) Roeland Voerman	Porsche 997 GT3	G3	513	14th	2nd

=== Complete British Touring Car Championship results ===
(key) (Races in bold indicate pole position) (Races in italics indicate fastest lap)

Year	Team	Car	1	2	3	4	5	6	7	8	9	10	11	12	13	14	15	16	17	18	19	20	21	DC	Pts
1993	Tamchester Team Maxted	Vauxhall Cavalier	SIL; 15	DON; 10	SNE; 17	DON; Ret	OUL; 14	BRH; 1 Ret	BRH; 2 DNS	PEM; 12	SIL; 11	KNO; 1; 18	KNO; 2 Ret	OUL; 15	BRH; 16	THR; 21	DON; 1 DNS	DON; 2; 18	SIL; 16					24th	1
1994	Maxted Motorsport	Toyota Carina E	THR; 19	BRH; 1 DNS	BRH; 2 DNS																			33rd	0
1994	Maxted Motorsport	Vauxhall Cavalier 16v				SNE; Ret	SIL; 1	SIL; 2	OUL; Ret	DON; 1; 21	DON; 2; 19	BRH; 1; 20	BRH; 2; 22	SIL	KNO; 1	KNO; 2	OUL	BRH; 1	BRH; 2	SIL; 1	SIL; 2	DON; 1	DON; 2	33rd	0

=== Complete Deutsche Tourenwagen Meisterschaft results ===
(key) (Races in bold indicate pole position) (Races in italics indicate fastest lap)

Year	Team	Car	1	2	3	4	5	6	7	8	9	10	11	12	13	14	15	16	17	18	19	20	21	22	DC	Pts
1993	Tamchester Team Maxted	Vauxhall Cavalier	ZOL; 1	ZOL; 2	HOC; 1	HOC; 2	NÜR; 1	NÜR; 2	WUN; 1	WUN; 2	NÜR; 1	NÜR; 2	NOR; 1	NOR; 2	DON; 1; 21	DON; 2; 18	DIE; 1	DIE; 2	SIN; 1	SIN; 2	AVU; 1	AVU; 2	HOC; 1	HOC; 2	NC†	0†

† Not classified in championship due to only entering in the non-championship event.

=== 24 Hours of Le Mans results ===
Year	Team	Co-Drivers	Car	Class	Laps	Pos.	Class Pos.
2003	(France) Thierry Perrier (France) Perspective Racing	(Belgium) Michel Neugarten (United Kingdom) Nigel Smith	Porsche 911 GT3-RS	GT	305	18th	**3rd**
2004	(France) Thierry Perrier (France) Perspective Racing	(United Kingdom) Nigel Smith (United Kingdom) Tim Sugden	Porsche 911 GT3-RS	GT	283	23rd	10th

=== Complete 24 Hours of Silverstone results ===
Year	Team	Co-Drivers	Car	Car No.	Class	Laps	Pos.	Class Pos.
2008	(United Kingdom) Mark Bailey Racing	(United Kingdom) Andrew Thompson (United Kingdom) Howard Spooner (United Kingdom) Adrian Willmott	Morgan Aero 8	23	1	290	DNF	DNF

=== Complete Porsche Supercup results ===
(key) (Races in bold indicate pole position) (Races in italics indicate fastest lap)

Year	Team	1	2	3	4	5	6	7	8	9	10	11	12	13	DC	Points
2009	Porsche Cars Great Britain	BHR1	BHR2	ESP1	MON; 20	TUR	GBR	GER	HUN	ESP2	BEL	ITA	UAE1	UAE2	NC†	0†

† Not eligible for points due to being a guest driver.
