= Ian Cantwell =

British racing driver (born 1966)

Ian Cantwell (born 24 July 1966 in Harefield) is a British former racing driver who drove in the British Touring Car Championship.

== Racing career ==
Cantwell first started in motocross for 12 years and was a champion at 16, along with a couple of years karting. In 1991, he drove in the BRDC Production Saloon Car Championship, finishing second in the GT class. For 1992, he raced in the British Group N Saloon Car Championship. He spent one year in the BTCC in 1993 driving a former works Mazda 323F for Asquith Autosport. His best race finish was a ninth place in the second round at Donington Park. In 1996, he competed in the inaugural year of the Elf Renault Sport Spider UK Cup.

=== Complete British Touring Car Championship results ===
(key) (Races in bold indicate pole position) (Races in italics indicate fastest lap)

Year	Team	Car	1	2	3	4	5	6	7	8	9	10	11	12	13	14	15	16	17	DC	Pts
1993	Asquith Autosport	Mazda 323F	SIL; 12	DON; 9	SNE; Ret	DON	OUL	BRH; 1 Ret	BRH; 2; 17	PEM; DNQ	SIL; 16	KNO; 1	KNO; 2	OUL	BRH	THR	DON; 1	DON; 2	SIL	22nd	2
