= Tim Sugden =

British racing driver (born 1964)

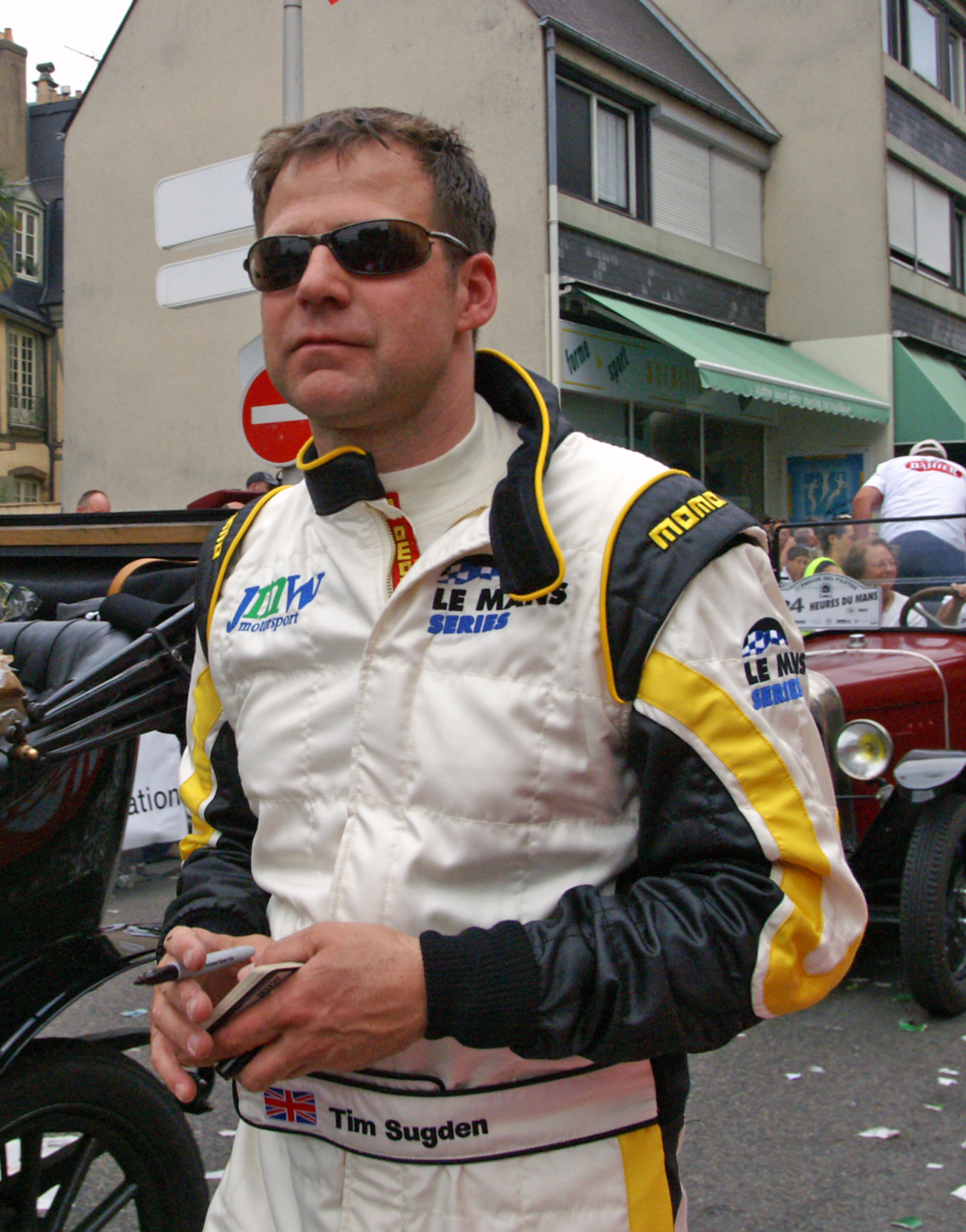
- Sugden during the 2009 24 Hours of Le Mans Drivers' Parade
- Nationality: (United Kingdom) British
- Born: Timothy Philip Sugden; 26 April 1964 (age 62) Bradford, England
- Categorisation: FIA Gold (until 2013); FIA Silver (2014–2019); FIA Bronze (2020–)

24 Hours of Le Mans career
- Years: 1998, 2003 – 2004, 2006, 2008 –2011
- Teams: Gulf Team Davidoff, DeWalt Racesport Salisbury, Thierry Perrier, Russian Age Racing, Virgo Motorsport, JMW Motorsport
- Best finish: 4th (1998)
- Class wins: 0

Timothy Philip Sugden (born 26 April 1964, in Bradford) is a British racing driver. He is both driver and manager for his own racing team, Tim Sugden Motorsport, and owns Leeds-based car retailer Purple Dot.

== Early career ==
Sugden started racing in karting, where he became British champion. He soon moved up to Formula Ford 1600, winning the Star of Mallory series in 1987. Despite working on a small budget, he gained top place finishes at senior level FF1600 driving the works Swift "Tredaire" car for Frank Bradley. He also drove in the Honda CRX challenge and British Formula 3000. In 1990, he finished third in the Formula Renault Championship, with one race victory along the way.

== BTCC ==
Sugden first raced in the British Touring Car Championship came in 1990. He entered selected rounds for the Prodrive ran Junior BMW Team in the 2.0litre class. An impressive performance for the team in 1991 saw him win at Brands Hatch, finishing the year in tenth place, despite only competing in five rounds. This led to a full season in 1992 for the works BMW team, where he ended the year eighth on points. Prodrive's contract with BMW ended but Sugden was retained for 1993 by Prodrive for an abortive Mercedes entry and Sugden then returned to the series again in 1994. He entered selected rounds for the Toyota works team as a third driver alongside 1991 champion Will Hoy and former F1 driver Julian Bailey in a Toyota Carina. He was promoted to a full-time drive the following year, but as the team were not front runners in the championship, another disappointing season followed in 1995. This was both Toyota's and Sugden's final year racing in the BTCC but he worked as test driver for Vauxhall in 1996 as they developed the Vectra, while simultaneously competing in the Volkswagen Ventro VR6 Challenge championship, finishing third.

== GT Racing ==
Sugden's sports car racing career began in 1997 with an entry in the British GT Championship. In his first year, he won the GT2 title, alongside Steve O'Rourke in a Porsche 911 GT2. He then went on to win the GT1 titles in both 1998 and 1999, in a McLaren F1 GTR and a Lister Storm GTL, respectively. After already competing in the 24 Hours of Le Mans race (where he finished fourth overall in 1998 in the EMKA McLaren), he moved to full-time International GT racing in 2000 with the FIA GT Championship where he has nine wins and was runner-up in the GT2 class in 2005. He was winner of the Porsche Cup in 2005, awarded by Porsche to the driver of any privately entered Porsche car in selected racing or rally championships worldwide where points are scored through the season according to the ranking of the series. He is only the second British driver ever to win that Cup.

He has also competed in the American Le Mans Series in a Porsche, finishing second in GT2 in the Sebring 12 hours, the Daytona 24 Hours race, the Le Mans Series, and made a return to the British GT championship. In 2007, he was the Asian Porsche Carrera Cup champion, finished third in 2008 and finished second by one point in 2009. In 2011, he finished second in GT in the Daytona 24 hours driving a Porsche for Paul Miller Racing.

== BriSCA F2 Stock Cars ==
On 9 October 2010, Sugden won his debut F2 final in an evening race meeting at Skegness Stadium after working at Brands Hatch earlier that day getting an immediate upgrade to Yellow Top. He competed in selected F2 Stock car rounds that year, and won the Grand National final at Birmingham in November. In 2011, he entered the Northampton meeting on 13 March again winning the GN final and then the Birmingham meeting on the 19th when he won the Final and so was again upgraded to Blue Top. In his first six meetings, he has two overall wins and two GN wins but meetings limited due to other commitments. Hednesford on 10 April saw another win in a heat this time.

== Racing record ==
=== Complete British Touring Car Championship results ===
(key) (Races in bold indicate pole position – 1990 in class) (Races in italics indicate fastest lap – 1990 in class)

Year	Team	Car	Class	1	2	3	4	5	6	7	8	9	10	11	12	13	14	15	16	17	18	19	20	21	22	23	24	25	Overall Pos	Pts	Class Pos
1990	BMW Team Finance	BMW M3	B	OUL	DON	THR	SIL ovr:9 cls:4	OUL ovr:9 cls:2	SIL	BRH ovr:5 cls:2	SNE ovr:8 cls:3	BRH	BIR	DON ovr:8 cls:2	THR	SIL													12th	67	6th
1991	BMW Team Finance	BMW M3		SIL	SNE; Ret	DON	THR	**SIL**; 12^{1}	**BRH**; 1	SIL	DON; 1	DON; 2	OUL	BRH; 1	BRH; 2	DON; 5	THR	SIL; Ret											10th	32	
1992	M Team Mobil	BMW 318is		SIL; 5	THR; 14	OUL; 9	SNE; 9	BRH; 4	DON; 1; 8	DON; 2; 7	SIL; 11	KNO; 1 Ret	KNO; 2 DNS	PEM; 3	BRH; 1; 9	BRH; 2; 13	DON; Ret	SIL; 6											8th	43	
1994	Toyota Castrol Team	Toyota Carina E		THR	BRH; 1; 20	BRH; 2; 12	SNE; Ret	SIL; 1; 9	SIL; 2; 7	OUL; 12	DON; 1; 15	DON; 2; 14	BRH; 1	BRH; 2	SIL; Ret	KNO; 1	KNO; 2	OUL	BRH; 1	BRH; 2	SIL; 1; 9	SIL; 2; 10	DON; 1; 19	DON; 2; 14					19th	9	
1995	Team Toyota GB	Toyota Carina E		DON; 1; 9	DON; 2 Ret	BRH; 1; 14	BRH; 2; 10	THR; 1; 4	THR; 2 Ret	SIL; 1 Ret	SIL; 2; 6	OUL; 1 Ret	OUL; 2; 11	BRH; 1 Ret	BRH; 2 DNS	DON; 1; 8	DON; 2; 13	SIL; 8	KNO; 1; 7	KNO; 2; 10	BRH; 1; 12	BRH; 2; 9	SNE; 1; 6	SNE; 2; 7	OUL; 1 Ret	OUL; 2 Ret	SIL; 1; 13	SIL; 2; 6	14th	48	

1. – Race was stopped due to heavy rain. No points were awarded.

=== 24 Hours of Le Mans results ===
Year	Team	Co-Drivers	Car	Class	Laps	Pos.	Class Pos.
1998	(United Kingdom) Gulf Team Davidoff (United Kingdom) EMKA Racing	(United Kingdom) Steve O'Rourke (United States) Bill Auberlen	McLaren F1 GTR	GT1	343	4th	4th
2003	(United Kingdom) DeWalt Racesports Salisbury	(United Kingdom) Mike Jordan (United Kingdom) Michael Caine	TVR Tuscan T400R	GT	93	DNF	DNF
2004	(France) Thierry Perrier (France) Perspective Racing	(United Kingdom) Ian Khan (United Kingdom) Nigel Smith	Porsche 911 GT3-RS	GT	283	23rd	10th
2006	(Russia) Russian Age Racing (United Kingdom) Cirtek Motorsport	(United Kingdom) Nigel Smith (United Kingdom) Christian Vann	Ferrari 550-GTS Maranello	GT1	124	DNF	DNF
2008	(United Kingdom) Virgo Motorsport	(United Kingdom) Rob Bell (United Kingdom) Tim Mullen	Ferrari F430 GT2	GT2	289	DNF	DNF
2009	(United Kingdom) JMW Motorsport	(United Kingdom) Rob Bell (United Kingdom) Andrew Kirkaldy	Ferrari F430 GT2	GT2	320	23rd	4th
2010	(United Kingdom) JMW Motorsport	(United Kingdom) Rob Bell (United States) Bryce Miller	Aston Martin V8 Vantage GT2	GT2	71	DNF	DNF
2011	(United Kingdom) JMW Motorsport	(United Kingdom) Rob Bell (Netherlands) Xavier Maassen	Ferrari 458 Italia GTC	GTE; Pro	290	24th	9th

=== Complete Super GT results ===
Year	Team	Car	Class	1	2	3	4	5	6	7	8	DC	Pts
2010	ThunderAsia Racing	Mosler MT900M	GT300	SUZ	OKA; Ret	FUJ; Ret	SEP; Ret	SUG; Ret	SUZ	FUJ; C	MOT	NC	0

=== Complete 24 Hours of Spa results ===
Year	Team	Co-Drivers	Car	Class	Laps	Pos.	Class Pos.
1994	(Belgium) Toyota Racing	(Belgium) Philip Verellen (France) François Chatriot	Toyota Carina E	ST	86/Belt of distribution	DNF	DNF
1999	(United Kingdom) Foss-Tech Racing	(United Kingdom) Mark Lemmer (United Kingdom) Stephen Day	Honda Integra Type R	SP	452	12th	12th
2001	(United Kingdom) EMKA Racing	(United Kingdom) Steve O'Rourke	Porsche 996 GT3-R	N-GT	N/A	Did not arrive	Did not arrive
2003	(United Kingdom) EMKA Racing	(France) Emmanuel Collard (United Kingdom) Chris Goodwin	Porsche 996 GT3-R	N-GT	301/Gearbox	DNF	DNF
2004	(United Kingdom) Gruppe M	(United Kingdom) Jonathan Cocker (United Kingdom) Warren Hughes (United Kingdom) Tim Mullen	Porsche 996 GT3-RSR	N-GT	268/Gearbox	DNF	DNF
2005	(United Kingdom) Gruppe M	(France) Emmanuel Collard (France) Stephane Ortelli	Porsche 996 GT3-RSR	GT2	477	19th	4th
2006	(Monaco) JMB Racing	(Switzerland) Iradj Alexander (France) Jean-Michel Martin (France) Stephane Daoudi	Ferrari F430 GTC	GT2	133	DNF	DNF
2007	(United Kingdom) Scuderia Ecosse	(United Kingdom) Andrew Kirkaldy (Canada) Chris Niarchos	Ferrari F430 GTC	GT2	474	15th	6th
2008	(United Kingdom) Trackspeed Racing	(United Kingdom) Richard Williams (United Kingdom) David Ashburn (France) Xavier Pompidou	Porsche 997 GT3-RSR	GT2	382/DNF	DNF	DNF
2009	(United Kingdom) Trackspeed Racing	(United Kingdom) David Ashburn (France) Stephane Ortelli (Germany) Jorg Bergmeister	Porsche 997 GT3-RSR	GT2	486	18th	7th

Sporting positions
Preceded by John Morrison; John Greasley	British GT Champion; 1998 with: Steve O'Rourke	Succeeded by Calum Lockie
Preceded by Darryl O'Young	Porsche Carrera Cup Asia; Champion; 2007	Succeeded by Darryl O'Young
