= Chris Goodwin =

British racing driver (born 1967)

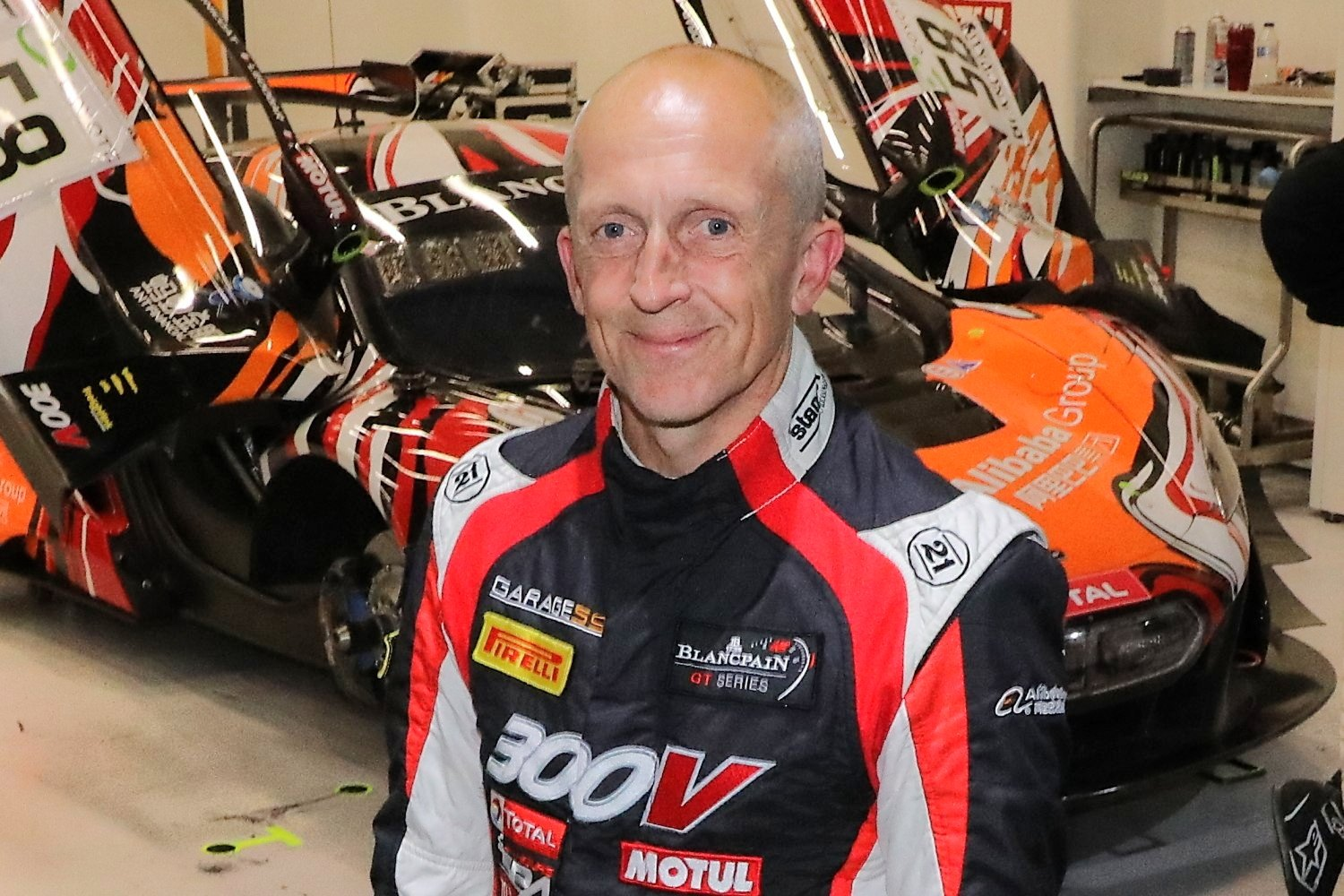
- Goodwin driving in 24 hours Spa 2018
- Nationality: (United Kingdom) British
- Born: Stephen Christopher Goodwin; 10 March 1967 (age 59)
- Debut season: 1987
- Categorisation: FIA Silver (until 2016); FIA Bronze (2017–)

Stephen Christopher Goodwin (10 March 1967) is a British auto racing driver. He currently works as Expert High Performance Test Driver for Aston Martin. Additionally he manages the racing career of Bruno Senna and continues to race in International GT Endurance events. He is the co-founder of Garage 59.

He was also TV commentator on F1 for ESPN Star Sports for nearly ten years and occasionally still appears on EPS&M and other networks such as ITV (GP2 coverage).

== Racing career ==
Goodwin's early racing was in single-seaters, starting in 1987 with the Formula First Championship. He was featured in the final episode of the 1987 series of Top Gear in which he collided with another competitor. He was Champion of Brands Hatch and finished runner-up in the 1989 Formula Ford Junior Championship, and runner-up again in 1990 when he competed in Formula Renault. He competed in Formula 3000 and Formula Vauxhall in 1991 and 1992 respectively.

In 1993, Goodwin drove in two rounds of the British Touring Car Championship for the Ecurie Ecosse Vauxhall Team in a Vauxhall Cavalier. This included an impressive tenth-place finish at the final round at Silverstone. He entered a Cavalier in 1994 as an independent entry for Roy Kennedy Racing, finishing third in the Cup for Privateers despite missing some rounds.

In 1995 and 1996, Goodwin drove for the factory Lotus GT team in International GT Endurance races.

Goodwin worked for McLaren in 1997, competing in both the FIA GT Championship and Le Mans. In 1999, he raced the British GT Championship with a McLaren F1 GTR. Two more years were spent in the British GTs in 1999 and 2000. In 2001 he raced in both the European Le Mans Series winning the GTS class and the ASCAR Championship. He returned to Touring Cars in 2002 driving a Nissan Primera in the European Touring Car Championship.

In 2008, Goodwin was instrumental in establishing the SLR GT Trophy for the Mercedes Benz SLR McLaren sportscar and finished second in six races.

Most recently, Goodwin has raced in the FIA GT3 Championship, the FIA GT Championship (best result third in GT2 at the Spa 24 Hours) and in GT2 in the International GT Open Championship.

Goodwin, in his role as McLaren Automotive Chief Test Driver, drove the 2008 title-winning MP4-23 Formula One car at the Goodwood Festival of Speed on Friday 3 July 2009.

Goodwin was announced as Expert High Performance Test Driver for Aston Martin on 20 December 2017.

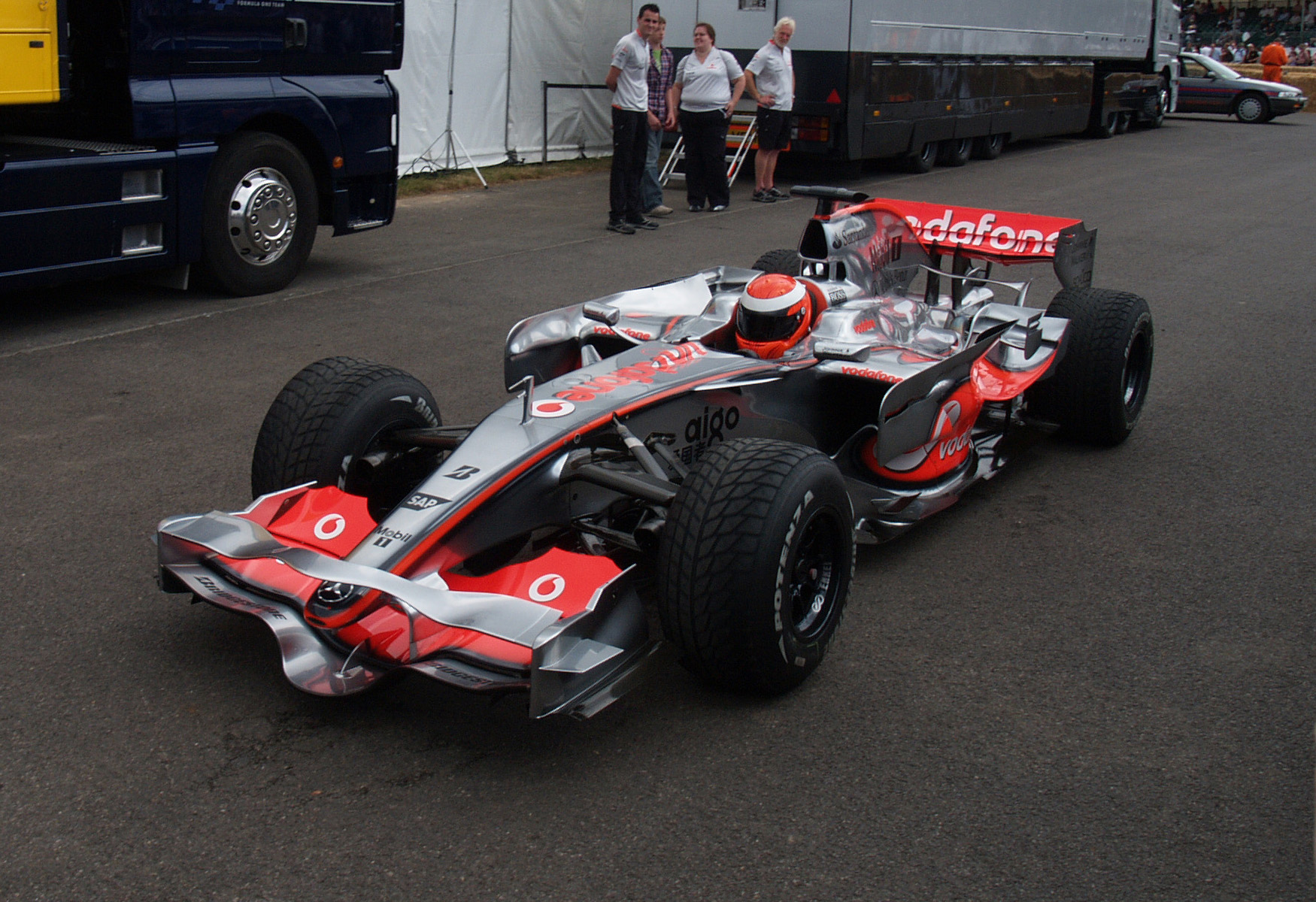
Goodwin driving the MP4-23 at the 2009 Goodwood Festival of Speed

== Racing record ==
=== Complete British Touring Car Championship results ===
(key) (Races in bold indicate pole position) (Races in italics indicate fastest lap)

| Year | Team | Car | 1 | 2 | 3 | 4 | 5 | 6 | 7 | 8 | 9 | 10 | 11 | 12 | 13 | 14 | 15 | 16 | 17 | 18 | 19 | 20 | 21 | Pos | Pts |
|---|---|---|---|---|---|---|---|---|---|---|---|---|---|---|---|---|---|---|---|---|---|---|---|---|---|
| 1993 | Ecurie Eccose Vauxhall | Vauxhall Cavalier | SIL | DON | SNE | DON | OUL | BRH; 1 | BRH; 2 | PEM | SIL | KNO; 1 | KNO; 2 | OUL | BRH; Ret | THR | DON; 1 | DON; 2 | SIL; 10 | | | | | **26th** | **1** |
| 1994 | Roy Kennedy Racing | Vauxhall Cavalier 16v | THR | BRH; 1; 14 | BRH; 2; 13 | SNE; 14 | SIL; 1; 17 | SIL; 2; 17 | OUL; 15 | DON; 1; 19 | DON; 2; 17 | BRH; 1; 17 | BRH; 2 Ret | SIL; DNS | KNO; 1 | KNO; 2 | OUL; 18 | BRH; 1; 22 | BRH; 2; 11 | SIL; 1; 19 | SIL; 2; 15 | DON; 1; 14 | DON; 2; 21 | **26th** | **0** |

=== Complete European Touring Car Championship results ===
(key) (Races in bold indicate pole position) (Races in italics indicate fastest lap)

| Year | Team | Car | 1 | 2 | 3 | 4 | 5 | 6 | 7 | 8 | 9 | 10 | 11 | 12 | 13 | 14 | 15 | 16 | 17 | 18 | 19 | 20 | Pos | Pts |
|---|---|---|---|---|---|---|---|---|---|---|---|---|---|---|---|---|---|---|---|---|---|---|---|---|
| 2002 | (United Kingdom) RJN Motorsport | Nissan Primera | MAG; 1 | MAG; 2 | SIL; 1 | SIL; 2 | BRN; 1 | BRN; 2 | JAR; 1 | JAR; 2 | AND; 1 Ret | AND; 2 DNS | OSC; 1 | OSC; 2 | SPA; 1 | SPA; 2 | PER; 1 | PER; 2 | DON; 1 | DON; 2 | EST; 1 | EST; 2 | NC | 0 |

=== Complete 24 Hours of Spa results ===
| Year | Team | Co-Drivers | Car | Class | Laps | Pos. | Class Pos. |
|---|---|---|---|---|---|---|---|
| 2003 | (United Kingdom) EMKA Racing | (France) Emmanuel Collard | Porsche 996 GT3-R | N-GT | 301/Gearbox | DNF | DNF |
| 2004 | (United Kingdom) Ray Mallock Ltd | (Brazil) Thomas Erdos (Portugal) Miguel Ramos (United Kingdom) Mike Newton | Saleen S7-R | GT | 220/engine | DNF | DNF |
| 2009 | (United Kingdom) CRS Racing | (United Kingdom) Phil Quaife (Canada) Chris Niarchos (United Kingdom) Tim Mullen | Ferrari F430 GTC | GT | 525 | 9th | 6th |
| 2011 | (United Kingdom) McLaren GT | (United Kingdom) Robert Bell (United Kingdom) Tim Mullen | McLaren MP4-12C GT3 | PRO | 88/fire | DNF | DNF |
| 2012 | (United Kingdom) Von-Ryan Racing | (Portugal) Álvaro Parente (United Kingdom) Rob Barff (United Kingdom) Roger Wills | McLaren MP4-12C GT3 | PRO-AM | 497 | 9th | 4th |
| 2013 | (New Zealand) Von-Ryan Racing | (Brazil) Bruno Senna (United Kingdom) Rob Barff | McLaren MP4-12C GT3 | PRO | 540 | 15th | 8th |
| 2017 | (United Kingdom) Garage 59 | (Sweden) Alexander West (United Kingdom) Chris Harris (United Kingdom) Bradley Ellis | McLaren 650s GT3 | AM | 501 | 32nd | 7th |
| 2018 | (United Kingdom) Garage 59 | (Sweden) Alexander West (United Kingdom) Chris Harris (United Kingdom) Andrew Watson | McLaren 650s GT3 | AM | 391 | 42nd | 6th |
| 2019 | (United Kingdom) Garage 59 | (Sweden) Alexander West (United Kingdom) Chris Harris (United Kingdom) Ross Gunn | Aston Martin Vantage GT3 | AM | 391 | 47th | 9th |
