= AMG (automobile) =

The AMG automobile was a Swedish automobile manufactured by the AB Motorfabriken i Göteborg between 1903 and 1905.

The company had been building stationary engines since 1897; in the first years of the new century they began importing French Richard-Brasier cars. Swedish production of the marque was considered, but the plans failed. A new model, using twin-cylinder air-cooled engines bought from the German Fafnir company, was shown in 1903. These tended to overheat, and as a result they were soon changed to a water-cooled model. The engines were the only automobile part that were imported; everything else was made in Sweden. # Around 10 cars were built before the company failed in 1905; one was used regularly until 1928.
