= Nigel Smith (racing driver) =

British racing driver (born 1951)

- Nationality: (United Kingdom) British
- Born: 17 March 1951 (age 75) Surbiton, Surrey, England

British Touring Car Championship
- Years active: 1994–1995
- Teams: Team HMSO
- Starts: 45
- Wins: 0
- Poles: 0
- Fastest laps: 0
- Best finish: 25th in 1994

Nigel Smith (born 17 March 1951) is a British businessman and retired auto racing driver.

== Racing career ==
Smith's racing career started 1972 as a successful karting driver winning superkart grands prix in the Netherlands, Belgium and New Zealand. He made the switch to car racing in 1984, making appearances in Sports 2000 and Formula Ford. In 1990 and 1991, he was a front running driver in the Honda CRX Challenge. He privately entered a class B Ralt in the British Formula Three Championship in 1991 and 1992. In 1993, he competed in British Formula 2 with a Reynard 92D. He finished the season as the highest placed British driver with six podiums.

In 1994. Smith entered a former Ecurie Ecosse Vauxhall Cavalier in the British Touring Car Championship. A successful season saw him finish as runner-up in the Total Cup for Privateers and score his first outright point at Brands Hatch. He returned for another season in the BTCC in 1995 and finished third in the privateers cup.

Smith went on to compete in touring car racing in North America and Sweden. In 1998, he competed in one season of the GTR Euroseries before spending two years in FIA GT Championship in a N-GT class Porsche 911 GT3.

== Racing record ==
=== Complete British Touring Car Championship results ===
(key) (Races in bold indicate pole position) (Races in italics indicate fastest lap)

Year	Team	Car	1	2	3	4	5	6	7	8	9	10	11	12	13	14	15	16	17	18	19	20	21	22	23	24	25	Pos	Pts
1994	Team HMSO Cavalier	Vauxhall Cavalier 16v	THR; 18	BRH; 1; 13	BRH; 2; 14	SNE; 15	SIL; 1; 20	SIL; 2 Ret	OUL; 16	DON; 1; 20	DON; 2; 18	BRH; 1; 16	BRH; 2; 20	SIL; 13	KNO; 1 Ret	KNO; 2; 17	OUL; 17	BRH; 1; 19	BRH; 2; 10	SIL; 1; 17	SIL; 2; 16	DON; 1; 23	DON; 2; 20					25th	1
1995	HMSO Bookshops	Vauxhall Cavalier 16v	DON; 1; 16	DON; 2; 16	BRH; 1; 18	BRH; 2; 16	THR; 1; 11	THR; 2; 14	SIL; 1 Ret	SIL; 2 Ret	OUL; 1; 12	OUL; 2; 16	BRH; 1; 16	BRH; 2; 17	DON; 1; 16	DON; 2 Ret	SIL; Ret	KNO; 1; 12	KNO; 2; 18	BRH; 1; 16	BRH; 2; 16	SNE; 1; 17	SNE; 2; 15	OUL; 1; 14	OUL; 2; 14	SIL; 1 Ret	SIL; 2 DNS	26th	0

=== Complete Swedish Touring Car Championship results ===
(key) (Races in bold indicate pole position) (Races in italics indicate fastest lap)

Year	Team	Car	1	2	3	4	5	6	7	8	9	DC	Pts
1996	Bohlin Racing	Vauxhall Cavalier GSi	MAN; 1; 2	MAN; 2; 2	KAR; DNS	FAL; 1	FAL; 2	KNU; 1	KNU; 2	KIN; 1	KIN; 2	11th	35

=== Complete North American Touring Car Championship results ===
(Races in bold indicate pole position) (Races in italics indicate fastest lap)

Year	Team	Car	1	2	3	4	5	6	7	8	9	10	11	12	13	14	15	16	DC	Pts
1996	Motorsport Team Schemes	Vauxhall Cavalier	LRP; 1	LRP; 2	DET; 1	DET; 2	POR; 1	POR; 2	TOR; 1; 10	TOR; 2 DNS	TRV; 1	TRV; 2	MOH; 1; 9	MOH; 2; 9	VAN; 1	VAN; 2	LAG; 1	LAG; 2	13th	23

=== 24 Hours of Le Mans results ===
Year	Team	Co-Drivers	Car	Class	Laps	Pos.	Class Pos.
2001	(France) Perspective Racing	(France) Thierry Perrier (Belgium) Michel Neugarten	Porsche 911 GT3-RS	GT	275	9th	**3rd**
2003	(France) Thierry Perrier (France) Perspective Racing	(Belgium) Michel Neugarten (United Kingdom) Ian Khan	Porsche 911 GT3-RS	GT	305	18th	**3rd**
2004	(France) Thierry Perrier (France) Perspective Racing	(United Kingdom) Ian Khan (United Kingdom) Tim Sugden	Porsche 911 GT3-RS	GT	283	23rd	10th
2006	(Russia) Russian Age Racing (United Kingdom) Cirtek Motorsport	(United Kingdom) Tim Sugden (United Kingdom) Christian Vann	Ferrari 550-GTS Maranello	GT1	124	DNF	DNF
