= Alpha Male Gorillas =

American multi-genre music band

Alpha Male Gorillas (AMG) are an American multi-genre band from Newburgh, New York. Formed in late 2004, the lineup currently consists of vocalist and bassist Dave Heinz, vocalist and lead guitarist Kris Bluenote, guitarist The Don, guitarist and producer Anthony De Fraia, drummer Chris Trainor and keyboardist EZI. In 2006 the band issued their debut LP, Band of Bugouts, and enjoyed radio success from the single "Bleed Marinara".

In 2008, the band achieved success in the Bodog Battle of the Bands, winning the New York regional before losing in the finals. In 2010, AMG released its second full-length album, No Working Title. Both albums were self-financed by the band and produced by Jon Stern at Rough Magic Studios in Poughkeepsie, New York.

AMG released its first E.P. -- the E.P. -- on March 22, 2012.

On May 6, 2012, AMG opened for national touring act Candlebox alongside Sugar Red Drive at the Chance Theatre in Poughkeepsie, NY.

AMG is set to release its 2nd E.P., currently titled Backflips and Burnouts, on July 11, 2012, when they open for Fuel.

== Style ==
AMG presents listeners with an inflection of multiple styles, traversing through areas of rock, blues, hip hop and reggae, with elements of psychedelic. The band coined the term "Heavy Mellow.".

== Bleed Marinara, Bodog Battle and No Working Title ==
In 2006, AMG released its first single, Bleed Marinara, which shot to success on YouTube and received airplay on radio stations such as WSPK, WPDH and WRRV. The song is an ode to being Italian.

In 2008, AMG joined a pool of over 10,000 unsigned bands to participate in the 2nd Bodog Battle of the Bands, with the grand prize being a $1 million recording contract and a spot on a reality TV series on the FUSE Network. After advancing through preliminary rounds, AMG won the New York bracket and advanced to regional finals against other groups from Philadelphia and Boston. The band lost to All Grown Up in the finals.

In 2010 review of No Working Title, Thunder Roads Magazine said: "The style of music is not easy to pin down, however they have tasty influences that range from Led Zeppelin, Black Sabbath, Cypress Hill, and even Syd Barrett era Pink Floyd."

In January 2011, TheCelebrityCafe.com said of AMG's song Beach Bum: "Beach Bum tells the story of exactly who the title describes, living off the land (and water) in the most relaxed manner: “No money/no hurry/listen honey/I got no worries.” The irony is that writing a song about this might get you chicks, but actually living this lifestyle would get you arrested for vagrancy." The reviewer concluded, "I cannot, in good conscience, recommend this album to anyone unless they have an equalizer function that removes overdone pot references."

In May 2012, The Don did an interview with The Soap Box, where he clarified that the Alpha Male Gorillas name comes from the True Alpha Male, Pauly Pizzwald.

== Discography ==
Album	Year
Band of Bugouts	2006
No Working Title	2010
The E.P.	2012
Backflips and Burnouts (E.P.)	2012

== Members ==
Current lineup

- The Don - Guitar (2004–Present)
- Octavius - Lead Vocals, Guitar (2004–Present)
- Dave Heinz - Vocals, Bass (2005–Present)
- EZI - Keyboards (2004–Present)
- Ant De Fraia - Multi-instrumentalist and producer (2005–Present)
- Chris Trainor - Drums (2010–Present)

- Nick Cage (2004–Present)

Former members

- Frank "The Dragon" Campolo - Multi-instrumentalist (2004–2008)
- Joe Milli - Vocals (2004–2011)
