= AB Motorfabriken i Göteborg =

Swedish company

AB Motorfabriken i Göteborg (AMG) was founded in 1897 in Gothenburg, Sweden as a producer of stationary engines. In 1899 the company also began producing boat engines and started looking into automobile manufacturing. They went to France and looked for suitable models, settling on the Brasier. They imported Brasiers until their own models could be produced.

In 1903 their first automobile was made. Except for engine, ignition system, carburetor, and tires, the car was made entirely of Swedish products. The engine used was the German Fafnir, but converted to be water-cooled. Transmission was via propshaft, rather than chain or belt as was the norm. The first car was driven from Gothenburg to Stockholm for a car exhibition. However, finances were grim and only ten cars were built. Production ended in 1906.
