= Janspeed =

Janspeed Technologies Ltd
- Company type: Private
- Industry: Motorsport; Automotive engineering
- Founded: 1962
- Headquarters: Salisbury, England
- Key people: János Ódor; Kieth O'Dor; Mark Vaughan
- Products: performance car parts, automotive engineering
- Website: www.janspeed.com

Janspeed Technologies Ltd is an automotive performance tuning company, specialising in exhaust systems. The company was founded in 1962 by János Ódor. With a workforce of 74 employees, Janspeed works closely with many luxury and performance car makers including Aston Martin, Lotus and Bentley. As well as customer products, Janspeed has also been a race car preparation business, which has among others, built works Datsun and later Nissan vehicles for the British Touring Car Championship and DTM.

== History ==
In 1956 János Ódor emigrated from Hungary to Britain and after an apprenticeship with Downton Engineering, founded his company as Janspeed Engineering Ltd in Salisbury in October 1962. Initially specialising in exhausts and performance parts for the BMC Mini, Janspeed soon expanded to providing turbocharging units and other equipment designed to fit Vauxhall and Ford vehicles.

== Motor Sport ==
As well as providing performance parts for road users, the company has a long established association with motor racing. Janspeed was contracted by British Leyland in 1968 to prepare cars for the London to Sydney Marathon. Following this, Janspeed gained a contract from Datsun and built works cars for the Avon Tour of Britain in 1973. Success followed in 1974, '75 and '76 with Datsun Sunny's winning the Dutch Touring Car Championship.

== BTCC ==
In 1990, Janspeed built the Nissan Skyline GTR to Group N specifications for endurance racing, winning the 24 Hours of Spa and 24 Hours of Nurburgring races. Building on their partnership with Nissan, Janspeed was awarded the works contract to build the Nissan Primera for the British Touring Car Championship starting in 1991.

The BTCC had just undergone a major rule change making the series open only to cars of 2.0 engine displacement in an attempt to eliminate homologation specials and attract manufacturer support, better known as the Super Touring regulations. Nissan saw the potential in competing and decided to join the series full-time. János was installed as the team principal, and Alan Heaphy as the team manager. Their drivers were ex-Formula 1 driver Julian Bailey partnering Jan's son Kieth O'Dor and with sponsorship from Castrol oils, the cars had potential but required a lot of development work. Kieth finished 17th in the standings that season.

Kieth was partnered in 1992 first by Andy Middlehurst and then James Weaver, and results were better. O'Dor improved to finish 12th, however the year ended in a huge accident at the TOCA Shootout at Donington, when O'Dor's Primera vaulted the fencing at the Old Hairpin.

1993 was a much better season. O'Dor was paired with triple BTCC champion Win Percy and the car was much improved. Kieth took a brace of podium places before a breakthrough maiden win at the British Grand Prix support round at Silverstone with Percy second. Kieth finished 6th overall at season's end.

The Janspeed Nissan used a gearbox developed by David Brown David Brown Ltd.

The following season was a struggle. The other manufacturers were starting to invest millions of pounds into the series, and although the team was now sponsored by Old Spice and employed Eric van der Poele, the cars were off the pace. At the end of the year Nissan pulled out of the BTCC to concentrate on the STW in Germany. This caused Janspeed to also leave the series.

Nissan rejoined the series in 1996 as a semi works team run by Andy Rouse and later run by RML with great success.

== Super Tourenwagen Cup ==
Janspeed moved to the STW Cup for the 1995 season, with their 1994 driver line up of Kieth and van der Poele, running under the BMS Scuderia Italia banner. The season started promisingly despite being overshadowed by BMW and Audi. Kieth won the first race of the day at AVUS late in the season, but during the second race suffered a spin, then was hit in the side of the car by Frank Biela's Audi. The impact critically injured O'Dor and he died later that evening.
