= 1990 British Touring Car Championship =

33rd season of the British Touring Car Championship

1990 BTCC season

Seasons
- ← 1989 1991 →

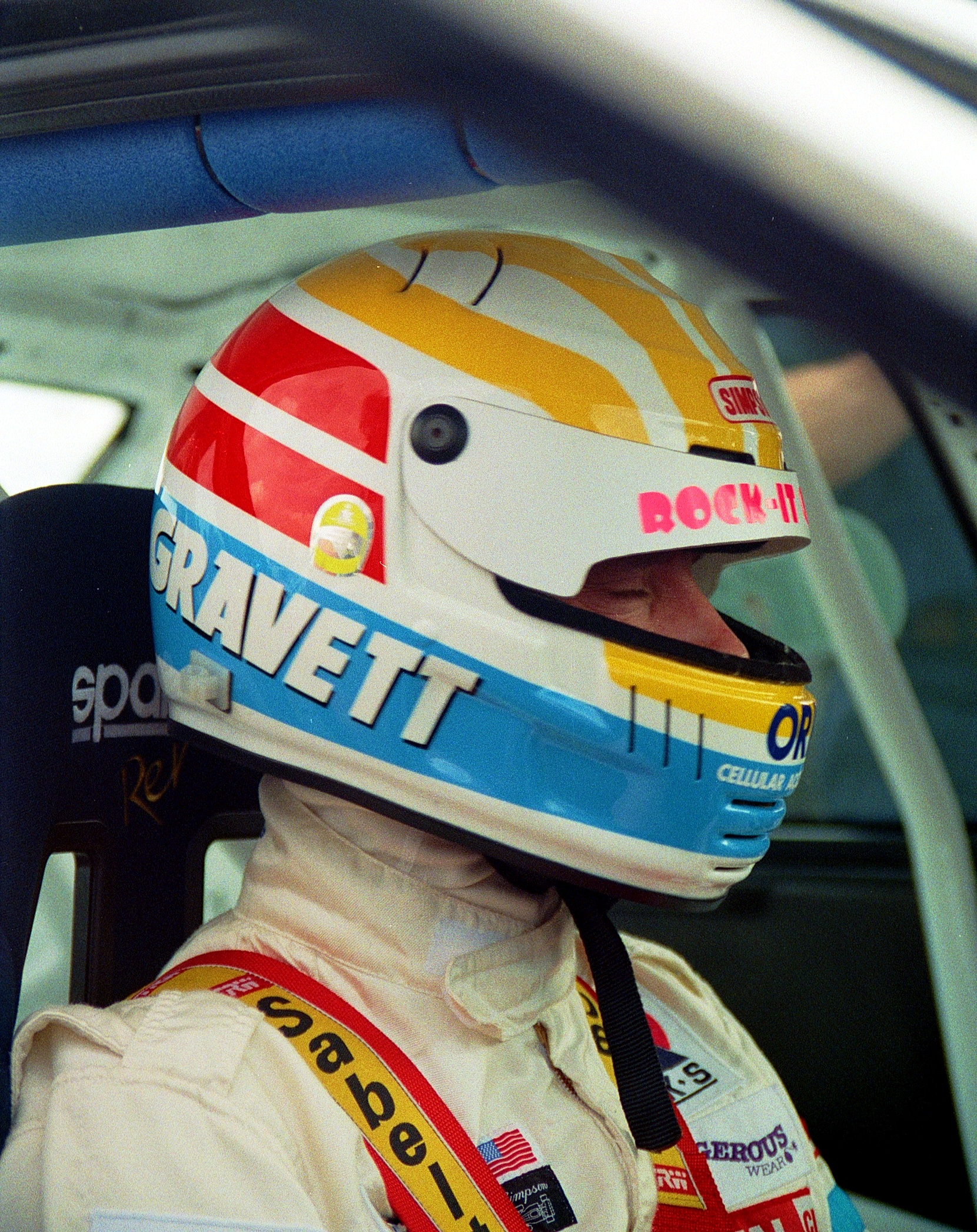
Robb Gravett, the 1990 British Touring Car Champion.

The 1990 Esso RAC British Touring Car Championship season was the 33rd British Touring Car Championship (BTCC) season and marked the last year of the Group A era. It was also the final year of the multi-class format.

== Changes for 1990 ==
- Classes changed from four to two. Group A cars now ran alongside the all new 2 litre Touring Car Formula, with a view to a single class formula for 1991. This was to encourage new manufacturers to enter the series, with a more even field of cars and cheaper running costs. BMW and Vauxhall already entered works teams this year, with other manufacturers showing interest for future seasons.
- One hour endurance races increased from one to two.

== Season summary ==
The first race was won by Andy Rouse in his Ford Sierra RS500. He also won the first 1 Hour endurance race at Donington Park GP with David Sears. The next race at Thruxton was won by Robb Gravett. Gravett also won the next six races including the second 1 Hour endurance race at Brands Hatch with Mike Smith. Rouse won the Birmingham Superprix. This would be best remembered for the last lap accident between Frank Sytner and John Cleland. It would be the last time that the BTCC would race on the track. Gravett then won at Donington. The last two races, at Thruxton and Silverstone, were won by Rouse and Gravett. It was Gravett who won the championship, despite the team's struggle to run through the season on a low budget with no main sponsor. One advantage for Gravett as the season progressed was his use of Yokohama tyres, rather than the Dunlops used by his main rivals.

== Teams and drivers ==
Team	Car	No.	Drivers	Rounds	Endurance drivers
Class A
(United Kingdom) ICS plc	Ford Sierra RS500	1	(United Kingdom) Andy Rouse	All	(United Kingdom) David Sears^{D†} (United Kingdom) Gary Ayles^{B†}
(United Kingdom) Labatt's Team	Ford Sierra RS500	3	(United Kingdom) Tim Harvey	All	(Sweden) Slim Borgudd^{†}
(United Kingdom) Labatt's Team	Ford Sierra RS500	10	(United Kingdom) Laurence Bristow	All	(Australia) Tomas Mezera^{D†} (New Zealand) Paul Radisich^{B†}
(United Kingdom) FAI Auto Parts	Ford Sierra RS500	4	(United Kingdom) Sean Walker	All	(United Kingdom) Ian Flux^{†}
(United Kingdom) Listerine Racing Team	Ford Sierra RS500	5	(United Kingdom) Mike Newman	1, 3–6, 10–11, 13	
(United Kingdom) Listerine Racing Team	Ford Sierra RS500	5	(United Kingdom) Andy Middlehurst	9	
(United Kingdom) Listerine Racing Team	Ford Sierra RS500	15	(United Kingdom) Graham Goode	All	(United Kingdom) Mike Newman^{D†} Dave Brodie^{B†}
(United Kingdom) Trakstar Motorsport	Ford Sierra RS500	11	(United Kingdom) Robb Gravett	All	(Sweden) Stig Blomqvist^{D†} Mike Smith^{B†}
(United Kingdom) Trakstar Motorsport	Ford Sierra RS500	12	(United Kingdom) Mike Smith	1, 6, 13	
(United Kingdom) Trakstar Motorsport	Ford Sierra RS500	14	(United Kingdom) Graham Hathaway	2	(United Kingdom) Mike Smith^{D†}
(United Kingdom) Hathaway Racing	Ford Sierra RS500	14	(United Kingdom) Graham Hathaway	3–7, 9	(United Kingdom) Vince Woodman^{B†}
(United Kingdom) Brodie-Brittain Racing	Ford Sierra RS500	20	(United Kingdom) Dave Brodie	8, 11–12	
(United Kingdom) Stuart Donnan Racing	Ford Sierra RS500	21	(United Kingdom) Stuart Donnan	10, 13	
(United Kingdom) Judge Developments	Ford Sierra RS500	22	(United Kingdom) Dennis Leech	4–6, 9–12	
(United Kingdom) Crypton Engineering	Ford Sierra RS500	24	(Italy) Amato Ferrari	9–10	
Class B
(United Kingdom) Vauxhall Motorsport	Vauxhall Cavalier	50	(United Kingdom) John Cleland	All	(United Kingdom) Chris Hodgetts^{†}
(United Kingdom) Vauxhall Motorsport	Vauxhall Cavalier	70	(United Kingdom) Chris Hodgetts	5–8, 10	(United Kingdom) Bob Berridge^{B†}
(United Kingdom) Vauxhall Motorsport	Vauxhall Cavalier	70	(United Kingdom) David Coulthard	9	(United Kingdom) Bob Berridge^{B†}
(United Kingdom) Vauxhall Motorsport	Vauxhall Cavalier	70	(United Kingdom) Bob Berridge	11	(United Kingdom) Bob Berridge^{B†}
(United Kingdom) Vauxhall Motorsport	Vauxhall Cavalier	70	(Germany) Markus Oestreich	12–13	(United Kingdom) Bob Berridge^{B†}
(United States) Hawaiian Tropic	Ford Sierra Sapphire	51	(United Kingdom) Ray Bellm	1–4, 6, 11	(United Kingdom) James Shead^{D†}
(United States) Hawaiian Tropic	Ford Sierra Sapphire	51	(United Kingdom) Chris Hodgetts	12–13	(United Kingdom) James Shead^{D†}
(United Kingdom) Ecosse Motorsport	BMW M3	52	(United Kingdom) Ian Forrest	All	(United Kingdom) Bernard Hunter^{D†} Tony Bridge^{B†}
(United Kingdom) Ecosse Motorsport	BMW M3	53	(United Kingdom) Hugh Chalmers	1–2, 4–5, 7, 10	(United Kingdom) Jimmy McRae^{†}
(United Kingdom) Ecosse Motorsport	BMW M3	53	(United Kingdom) Jimmy McRae	3, 6	(United Kingdom) Jimmy McRae^{†}
(United Kingdom) Ecosse Motorsport	BMW M3	53	(United Kingdom) John Llewellyn	8	(United Kingdom) Jimmy McRae^{†}
(United Kingdom) Ecosse Motorsport	BMW M3	53	(United Kingdom) Karl Jones	9	(United Kingdom) Jimmy McRae^{†}
(United Kingdom) Ecosse Motorsport	BMW M3	53	(United Kingdom) Jim McGaughay	11, 13	(United Kingdom) Jimmy McRae^{†}
(United Kingdom) Ecosse Motorsport	BMW M3	53	(United Kingdom) Chuck Nicholson	12	(United Kingdom) Jimmy McRae^{†}
(Germany) BMW Team Finance	BMW M3	55	(United Kingdom) Frank Sytner	All	(United Kingdom) Kurt Luby^{†}
(Germany) BMW Team Finance	BMW M3	56	(United Kingdom) Kelvin Burt	1, 13	(United Kingdom) Kelvin Burt^{†}
(Germany) BMW Team Finance	BMW M3	56	(United Kingdom) Kurt Luby	2–3, 6, 9–10, 12	(United Kingdom) Kelvin Burt^{†}
(Germany) BMW Team Finance	BMW M3	56	(United Kingdom) Tim Sugden	4–5, 7–8, 11	(United Kingdom) Kelvin Burt^{†}
(United Kingdom) Techspeed Motorsport	BMW 318is	57	(United Kingdom) Nick Baird	1–6, 8, 10–13	(United Kingdom) David Carvell^{D†} Nigel Corry^{B†}
(United Kingdom) Techspeed Motorsport	BMW 318is	57	(United Kingdom) Robin Brundle	7	(United Kingdom) David Carvell^{D†} Nigel Corry^{B†}
(United Kingdom) HWR Motorsport	Vauxhall Belmont	58	(United Kingdom) Jeff Wilson	11–13	
(United Kingdom) BRR Motorsport	BMW M3	59	(United Kingdom) Ian Flux	12–13	
(United Kingdom) John Maguire Racing	Mitsubishi Starion	60	(United Kingdom) Mark Hales	All	(United Kingdom) Graham Scarborough^{†}
(United Kingdom) Pyramid Motorsport	BMW M3	66	(United Kingdom) Nick Whale	1–3, 5–13	(Netherlands) Gerrit van Kouwen^{†}
(United Kingdom) Pyramid Motorsport	BMW M3	77	(United Kingdom) Godfrey Hall	1–12	(United Kingdom) David Leslie^{†}
(United Kingdom) Pyramid Motorsport	BMW M3	88	(United Kingdom) John Clark	1, 3–11, 13	(United Kingdom) David Leslie^{B†}
(United Kingdom) Pyramid Motorsport	BMW M3	88	(United Kingdom) David Leslie	12	(United Kingdom) David Leslie^{B†}
(Canada) Arquati Racing Team	BMW M3	69	(United Kingdom) Jerry Mahony	1–6, 8	(Canada) Robbie Stirling^{D†}
BMW Team Sweden	BMW M3	90	(Sweden) Nettan Lindgren	1–2, 5–7, 9–13	(Sweden) Peggen Andersson^{†}
(United Kingdom) Vic Lee Motorsport	BMW M3	99	(United Kingdom) Jeff Allam	3–13	(United Kingdom) Vic Lee^{B†}
(United Kingdom) PG Tags Racing	Honda Civic	100	(United Kingdom) Ray Armes	1–7, 9–13	(United Kingdom) Jeremy Rossiter^{†}

^{†}Not eligible for points.
^{D}Donington Park only.
^{B}Brands Hatch only.

== Calendar ==
All races were held in the United Kingdom. Overall winners in **bold**.

Round	Circuit	Date	Pole position	Fastest lap	Class A winner	Class B winner
1	Oulton Park (International), Cheshire	13 April	(United Kingdom) Robb Gravett	(United Kingdom) Tim Harvey	(United Kingdom) **Andy Rouse**	(United Kingdom) Kelvin Burt
2*	Donington Park (Grand Prix), Leicestershire	29 April	(United Kingdom) Robb Gravett	(United Kingdom) Robb Gravett	(United Kingdom) **Andy Rouse** (United Kingdom) **David Sears**	(United Kingdom) **Frank Sytner** (United Kingdom) **Kurt Luby**
3	Thruxton Circuit, Hampshire	28 May	(United Kingdom) Robb Gravett	(United Kingdom) Robb Gravett	(United Kingdom) **Robb Gravett**	(United Kingdom) John Cleland
4	Silverstone Circuit (National), Northamptonshire	10 June	(United Kingdom) Andy Rouse	(United Kingdom) Tim Harvey	(United Kingdom) **Robb Gravett**	(United Kingdom) Frank Sytner
5	Oulton Park (International), Cheshire	1 July	(United Kingdom) Mike Newman	(United Kingdom) Robb Gravett	(United Kingdom) **Robb Gravett**	(United Kingdom) Frank Sytner
6	Silverstone Circuit (Grand Prix), Northamptonshire	15 July	(United Kingdom) Robb Gravett	(United Kingdom) Robb Gravett	(United Kingdom) **Robb Gravett**	(United Kingdom) Kurt Luby
7*	Brands Hatch (Indy), Kent	22 July	(United Kingdom) Robb Gravett	(United Kingdom) Andy Rouse	(United Kingdom) **Robb Gravett** (United Kingdom) **Mike Smith**	(United Kingdom) **Frank Sytner** (United Kingdom) **Kurt Luby**
8	Snetterton Motor Racing Circuit, Norfolk	5 August	(United Kingdom) Robb Gravett	(United Kingdom) Robb Gravett	(United Kingdom) **Robb Gravett**	(United Kingdom) John Cleland
9	Brands Hatch (Grand Prix), Kent	19 August	(United Kingdom) Robb Gravett	(United Kingdom) Robb Gravett	(United Kingdom) **Robb Gravett**	(United Kingdom) John Cleland
10	Birmingham Superprix, Birmingham	27 August	(United Kingdom) Robb Gravett	(United Kingdom) Robb Gravett	(United Kingdom) **Andy Rouse**	(United Kingdom) Kurt Luby
11	Donington Park (Grand Prix), Leicestershire	16 September	(United Kingdom) Andy Rouse	(United Kingdom) Andy Rouse	(United Kingdom) **Robb Gravett**	(United Kingdom) Frank Sytner
12	Thruxton Circuit, Hampshire	23 September	(United Kingdom) Robb Gravett	(United Kingdom) Robb Gravett	(United Kingdom) **Andy Rouse**	(Sweden) Nettan Lindgren
13	Silverstone Circuit (National), Northamptonshire	7 October	(United Kingdom) Tim Harvey	(United Kingdom) Andy Rouse	(United Kingdom) **Robb Gravett**	(United Kingdom) John Cleland

- * 1 hour endurance races.

== Driver Standings/Results ==
Overall DC	Class Pos	Driver	Class	OUL	DON	THR	SIL	OUL	SIL	BRH	SNE	BRH	BIR	DON	THR	SIL	Pts
1	1	(United Kingdom) Robb Gravett	A	**12**	**2**	**1**	1	1	**1**	**1**	**1**	**1**	**Ret**	1	**3**	1	207
2	1	(United Kingdom) Frank Sytner	B	6	**6**	9	6	8	Ret	4	7	8	Ret	7	10	8	180
3	2	(United Kingdom) Andy Rouse	A	1	1	10	**3**	2	2	Ret	16	2	1	**2**	1	2	173
4	3	(United Kingdom) Tim Harvey	A	4	Ret	2	Ret	3	3	2	2	3	4	3	2	**15**	132
5	2	(United Kingdom) John Cleland	B	7	Ret	**7**	**7**	**Ret**	**9**	**Ret**	**6**	**7**	**Ret**	**12**	**Ret**	**7**	128
6	3	(United Kingdom) Jeff Allam	B			8	8	11	10	8	10	9	7	9	11	9	124
7	4	(United Kingdom) Sean Walker	A	Ret	4	5	2	4	Ret	3	4	4	2	6	Ret	Ret	96
8	4	(United Kingdom) Godfrey Hall	B	DNS	7	12	10	12	11	6	15	12	9	11	12		92
9	5	(United Kingdom) Laurence Bristow	A	3	3	4	4	5	4	Ret	3	5	DNS	Ret	Ret	6	88
10	5	(Sweden) Nettan Lindgren	B	8	9			Ret	13	7		11	10	10	5	Ret	82
11	6	(United Kingdom) Graham Goode	A	Ret	5	6	Ret	7	5	Ret	5	6	DNS	4	4	3	72
12	6	(United Kingdom) Tim Sugden	B				9	9		5	8			8			67
13	7	(United Kingdom) Kurt Luby	B		Ret	11			8			10	6		16		60
14	7	(United Kingdom) Mike Newman	A	2		Ret	11	**17**	Ret				3	5		4	53
15	8	(United Kingdom) Ian Forrest	B	9	Ret	14	13	18	Ret	10	Ret	14	14	Ret	8	10	47
16	9	(United Kingdom) Chris Hodgetts	B					15	12	Ret	11		8		7	13	46
17	10	(United Kingdom) Nick Whale	B	DSQ	8	13		14	14	13	Ret	16	11	13	Ret	14	43
18	11	(United Kingdom) Mark Hales	B	Ret	Ret	Ret	Ret	16	17	9	9	15	12	15	17	Ret	28
19	12	(United Kingdom) Kelvin Burt	B	**5**												12	26
=	8	(United Kingdom) Graham Hathaway	A		Ret	3	5	6	DNP	Ret		DNS					26
21	13	(United Kingdom) Hugh Chalmers	B	Ret	10		14	13		11			15				23
22	14	(United Kingdom) Nick Baird	B	11	NC	15	15	Ret	15		14		DNS	16	18	17	16
=	15	(United Kingdom) Jerry Mahony	B	Ret	11	Ret	12	Ret	18		12		DNA				16
24	16	(Germany) Markus Oestreich	B												6	Ret	15
25	9	(United Kingdom) Mike Smith	A	Ret					6							5	14
26	10	(United Kingdom) Dennis Leech	A				DNP	10	7			19	DNS	Ret	DNS		11
27	17	(United Kingdom) John Clark	B	DNS		NC	Ret	Ret	Ret	NC	Ret	17	13	14		16	10
28	12	(Italy) Amato Ferrari	A									Ret	5				8
=	11	(United Kingdom) Dave Brodie	A								DNS			Ret	9		8
30	18	(United Kingdom) Ian Flux	B												Ret	11	8
31	19	(United Kingdom) Ray Armes	B	Ret	12	16	Ret	Ret	Ret	Ret		18	16	17	14	Ret	7
32	20	(United Kingdom) Ray Bellm	B	10	Ret	DNS	DNS		DNP				DNA	DNS			6
33	21	(United Kingdom) David Coulthard	B									13					4
34	22	(United Kingdom) John Llewellyn	B								13						3
=	23	(United Kingdom) Chuck Nicholson	B												13		3
36	24	(United Kingdom) Robin Brundle	B							12							2
=	25	(United Kingdom) Jimmy McRae	B			Ret			16								2
38	26	(United Kingdom) David Leslie	B												15		1
		(United Kingdom) Jeff Wilson	B											DNS	Ret	Ret	0
		(United Kingdom) Stuart Donnan	A										Ret			Ret	0
		(United Kingdom) Jim McGaughay	B											Ret		Ret	0
		(United Kingdom) Andy Middlehurst	A									Ret					0
		(United Kingdom) Bob Berridge	B											Ret			0
		(United Kingdom) Karl Jones	B									DNP					0
Overall DC	Class Pos	Driver	Class	OUL	DON	THR	SIL	OUL	SIL	BRH	SNE	BRH	BIR	DON	THR	SIL	Pts

Colour	Result
Gold	Winner
Silver	Second place
Bronze	Third place
Green	Points classification
Blue	Non-points classification
Blue	Non-classified finish (NC)
Purple	Retired, not classified (Ret)
Red	Did not qualify (DNQ)
Red	Did not pre-qualify (DNPQ)
Black	Disqualified (DSQ)
White	Did not start (DNS)
White	Withdrew (WD)
White	Race cancelled (C)
Blank	Did not practice (DNP)
Blank	Did not arrive (DNA)
Blank	Excluded (EX)

- Note: **bold** signifies pole position in class, italics signifies fastest lap in class.

=== Endurance drivers results ===
Driver	Class	DON	BHI
(United Kingdom) Kurt Luby	B	6	4
(United Kingdom) Mike Smith	A	Ret	1
(United Kingdom) David Sears	A	1	
(United Kingdom) David Leslie	B	7	6/NC
(Sweden) Slim Borgudd	A	Ret	2
(United Kingdom) Kelvin Burt	B	Ret	5
(Sweden) Stig Blomqvist	A	2	
(United Kingdom) Ian Flux	A	4	3
(Netherlands) Gerritt van Kouwen	B	8	13
(Australia) Tomas Mezera	A	3	
(Sweden) Peggen Andersson	B	9	7
(United Kingdom) Mike Newman	A	5	
(United Kingdom) Vic Lee	B		8
(United Kingdom) Graham Scarborough	B	Ret	9
(United Kingdom) Jimmy McRae	B	10	11
(United Kingdom) Tony Bridge	B		10
(Canada) Robbie Stirling	B	11	
(United Kingdom) Jeremy Rossiter	B	12	Ret
(United Kingdom) Nigel Corry	B		12
(United Kingdom) David Carvell	B	NC	
(United Kingdom) Chris Hodgetts	B	Ret	Ret
(United Kingdom) James Shead	B	Ret	
(United Kingdom) Bernard Hunter	B	Ret	
(United Kingdom) Dave Brodie	A		Ret
(United Kingdom) Gary Ayles	A		Ret
(United Kingdom) Vince Woodman	A		Ret
(New Zealand) Paul Radisich	A		Ret
(United Kingdom) Bob Berridge	B		Ret
Driver	Class	DON	BHI

Note: All endurance drivers were ineligible to score points.
