= Jeff Wilson (racing driver) =

British racing driver

Jeff Wilson (born 12 August 1948) is a British auto racing driver and expert in race car preparation. In 1978, along with Brian Holliday, he set up the HWR Motorsport team. Wilson is best known for competing in the 1991 British Touring Car Championship with a self prepared Vauxhall Belmont. Entering three rounds, he scored no championship points, but finished a creditable eleventh place at Donington Park. He has entered 28 events in his career, finishing 76% of them.

Wilson most recently competed in the BRSCC Race TV Open Sportscar Series in 2009.

== Racing record ==
=== Complete British Touring Car Championship results ===
(key) (Races in bold indicate pole position) (Races in italics indicate fastest lap)

| Year | Team | Car | Class | 1 | 2 | 3 | 4 | 5 | 6 | 7 | 8 | 9 | 10 | 11 | 12 | 13 | 14 | 15 | Pos | Pts | Class |
|---|---|---|---|---|---|---|---|---|---|---|---|---|---|---|---|---|---|---|---|---|---|
| 1990 | HWR Motorsport | Vauxhall Belmont | B | OUL | DON | THR | SIL | OUL | SIL | BRH | SNE | BRH | BIR | DON; DNS | THR; Ret | SIL; Ret | | | NC | 0 | NC |
| 1991 | HWR Motorsport | Vauxhall Belmont | | SIL | SNE | DON | THR | SIL | BRH | SIL | DON; 1 | DON; 2 | OUL; 13 | BRH; 1 | BRH; 2 | DON; 11 | THR | SIL; Ret | NC | 0 | |
