= 1991 British Touring Car Championship =

34th season of the British Touring Car Championship

1991 BTCC season

Seasons
- ← 1990 1992 →

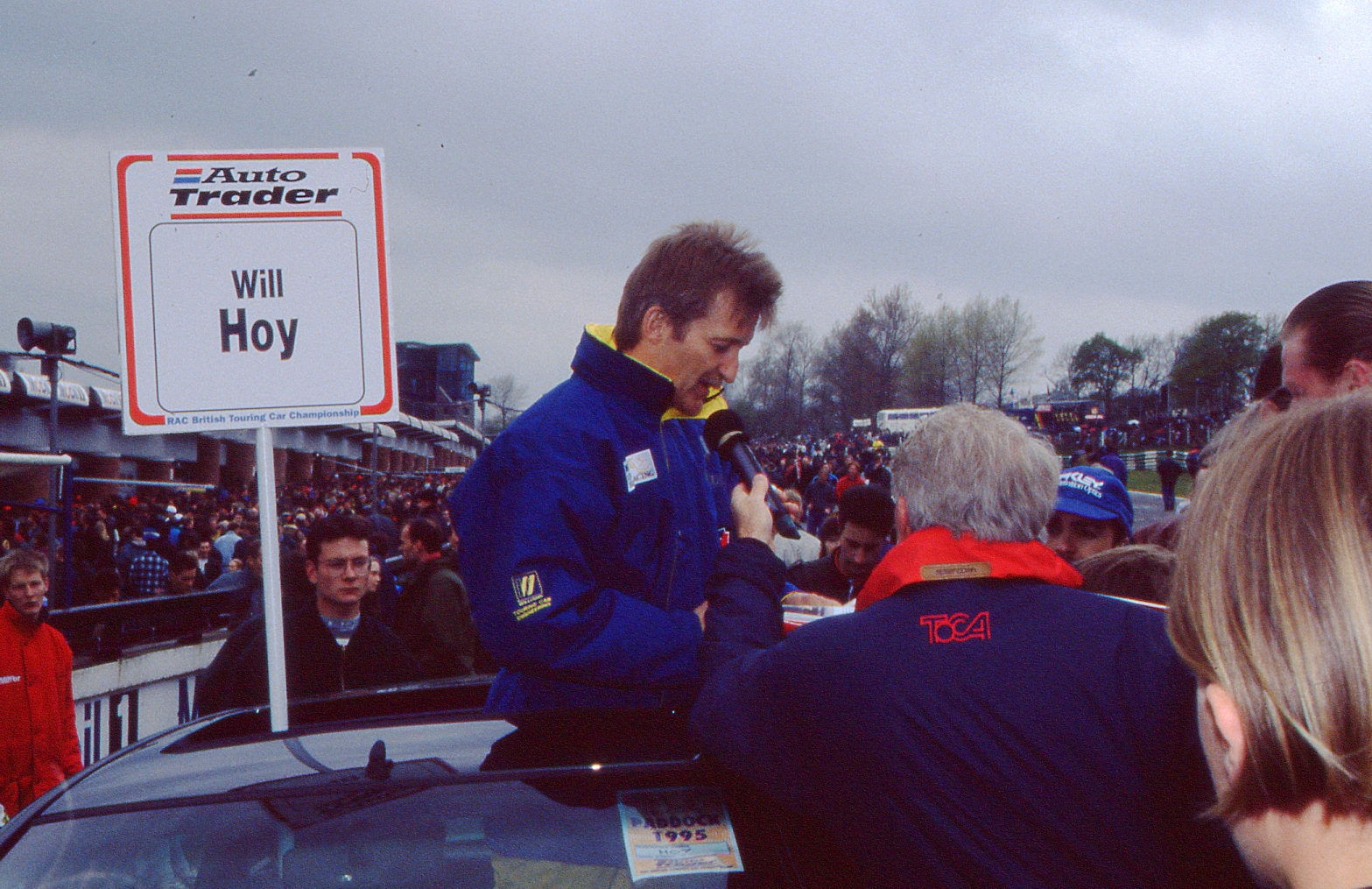
Will Hoy (pictured in 1995), the 1991 British Touring Car Champion.

The 1991 Esso RAC British Touring Car Championship season was the 34th British Touring Car Championship (BTCC) season and marked the first year of the Super Touring era.

== Changes for 1991 ==
- After a transitional year in 1990, the multi-class Group A regulations was fully dropped and replaced by the new Super Touring rules that had evolved out of Group A's Div. II category. Group A cars were still allowed to participate, but only as long as they were restricted to bring them down to Super Touring speeds.

== Season summary ==
Group A had towards the end of its existence been dominated by Ford and their Sierra RS500. Super Tourers had first appeared in 1990, and with BMW and Vauxhall running their cars in that category they effectively had a years head start on their opposition for 1991. BMW also had the numerical advantage, the factory Prodrive team entering two cars and the semi-factory Vic Lee Motorsport team entering four. Vauxhall had two cars, as had Toyota, while Ford only appeared with a single car for Robb Gravett's Trakstar team. Nissan missed the start of the season but then ran a single-car effort for Keith O'Dor driving a 2.0 Primera entered by Janspeed, and was joined by ex-Formula One driver Julian Bailey towards the end of the season and Mitsubishi was back, engineered by BTCC stalwart John McGuire Racing, fielding a one car team for Mark Hales, the team elected to run the Lancer GTI at the beginning of the season but was replaced by the larger Galant mid season.

The privateer entries would consist mainly of BMW M3s with the odd Ford Sierra entry, the most notable being Andy Middlehurst, and the odd appearance of Jeff Wilson in a Vauxhall Belmont.

Rover and Peugeot would also be represented briefly by privateers Grahame Davis and Andrew McKenzie while possible entries from Audi, Honda, Renault and Lancia were mooted but never materialised.

The championship battle would stand between Will Hoy and John Cleland. Hoy won the first two races of the season and kept scoring consistently, but as the season progressed it was Cleland who came out on top more often than not. Hoy's consistency however put him in a position to claim the championship at the penultimate round at Thruxton, provided he scored a good enough result. Indeed, Hoy took the lead of the race thanks to BMW team tactics, but soon thereafter he was controversially tapped into a spin by works BMW driver Jonathan Palmer. Hoy dropped down the field and later retired after contact with Cleland. Cleland would go on to finish 8th with a damaged car, taking the championship to the final race. There Hoy was able to finish ahead of Cleland, and thus claiming the first Super Touring championship win. Andy Rouse finished third for Toyota, and Steve Soper ended up fourth overall despite missing several races due to clashing commitments in the German DTM championship.

The 7th meeting of the season at Silverstone would be notable for the debut of future 3-time Champion Matt Neal in a Pyramid Motorsport-run BMW M3, finishing 13th out of 17 finishers.

== Teams and drivers ==
Team	Car	No.	Drivers	Rounds
Manufacturer
(United Kingdom) Trakstar Motorsport	Ford Sierra Sapphire	1	(United Kingdom) Robb Gravett	All
(Japan) Kaliber ICS Team Toyota	Toyota Carina	3	(United Kingdom) Andy Rouse	All
(Japan) Kaliber ICS Team Toyota	Toyota Carina	33	(United Kingdom) Gary Ayles	All
(Germany) BMW Team Labatt's	BMW M3	4	(United Kingdom) Tim Harvey	All
(Germany) BMW Team Labatt's	BMW M3	9	(United Kingdom) Laurence Bristow	1–11, 13
(Germany) BMW Team Labatt's	BMW M3	9	(Germany) Armin Hahne	12
(United Kingdom) Vauxhall Sport	Vauxhall Cavalier	5	(United Kingdom) John Cleland	All
(United Kingdom) Vauxhall Sport	Vauxhall Cavalier	6	(United Kingdom) Jeff Allam	All
(United Kingdom) Vauxhall Sport	Vauxhall Cavalier	56	(United Kingdom) Bob Berridge	12–13
(Germany) BMW Team Listerine	BMW M3	11	(United Kingdom) Will Hoy	All
(Germany) BMW Team Listerine	BMW M3	12	(United Kingdom) Ray Bellm	All
(Germany) BMW Team Finance	BMW M3	22	(United Kingdom) Jonathan Palmer	All
(Germany) BMW Team Finance	BMW M3	44	(United Kingdom) Steve Soper	1, 3, 7–10, 12
(Germany) BMW Team Finance	BMW M3	44	(United Kingdom) Tim Sugden	2, 5–6, 11, 13
(Germany) BMW Team Finance	BMW M3	44	(Germany) Christian Danner	4
(Japan) Nissan Janspeed Racing	Nissan Primera eGT	23	(United Kingdom) Kieth O'dor	2–13
(Japan) Nissan Janspeed Racing	Nissan Primera eGT	24	(United Kingdom) Julian Bailey	11–13
(United Kingdom) John Maguire Racing	Mitsubishi Lancer	88	(United Kingdom) Mark Hales	1–5
(United Kingdom) John Maguire Racing	Mitsubishi Galant	88	(United Kingdom) Mark Hales	8–13
Independent
(United Kingdom) Pyramid Motorsport	BMW M3	2	(United Kingdom) Frank Sytner	1–8, 10–11
(United Kingdom) Pyramid Motorsport	BMW M3	2	(United Kingdom) David Leslie	13
(United Kingdom) Pyramid Motorsport	BMW M3	18	(United Kingdom) Matt Neal	7
(United Kingdom) Pyramid Motorsport	BMW M3	18	(United Kingdom) Alistair Fenwick	12
(United Kingdom) Pyramid Motorsport	BMW M3	18	(United Kingdom) Godfrey Hall	13
(United Kingdom) Sean Walker Racing	Ford Sierra RS500	7	(United Kingdom) Sean Walker	2
BMW Team Sweden	BMW M3	10	(Sweden) Nettan Lindgren	1–3, 5–6
BMW Team Sweden	BMW M3	91	(Sweden) Peggen Andersson	1–3, 6
(United Kingdom) R&D Motorsport	BMW 318is	13	(United Kingdom) Angus MacKay	1–2
(United Kingdom) R&D Motorsport	BMW 318is	13	(United Kingdom) Alistair Lyall	4, 7, 13
(Italy) ACE Motorsport	Peugeot 405 Mi16	17	(United Kingdom) Andrew MacKenzie	7, 10
(United Kingdom) Judge Developments	Ford Sierra RS500	19	(United Kingdom) Dennis Leech	1–4
(United Kingdom) Moto-Build	Rover 216GTi	20	(United Kingdom) Grahame Davis	1–2, 7, 10
(United Kingdom) Brodie Brittain Racing	Ford Sierra Sapphire 4x4	21	(United Kingdom) Dave Brodie	10–13
(United Kingdom) Drambuie Racing	BMW M3	45	(United Kingdom) Ian Forrest	All
(United Kingdom) HWR Motorsport	Vauxhall Belmont	58	(United Kingdom) Jeff Wilson	9, 11, 13
(United Kingdom) HWR Motorsport	Vauxhall Belmont	58	(United Kingdom) Tony Bardy	12
(United Kingdom) BRR Motorsport	BMW M3	59	(United Kingdom) Ian Flux	1, 3–5, 13
(United Kingdom) BRR Motorsport	BMW M3	59	(United Kingdom) Matt Neal	9
(United Kingdom) BRR Motorsport	BMW M3	59	(United Kingdom) Val Musetti	11
(United Kingdom) Auto Trader Techspeed Team	BMW M3	66	(United Kingdom) Nick Whale	1–5, 8–9, 11–13
(United Kingdom) Auto Trader Techspeed Team	BMW M3	66	(United Kingdom) David Leslie	7
(United Kingdom) Auto Trader Techspeed Team	BMW M3	66	(United Kingdom) John Llewellyn	10
(United Kingdom) Auto Trader Techspeed Team	BMW M3	77	(United Kingdom) Nick Baird	1–5, 7–8, 12–13
(United Kingdom) Auto Trader Techspeed Team	BMW M3	77	(United Kingdom) Matt Neal	11
(United Kingdom) Graham Goode Racing	Ford Sierra RS Cosworth	99	(United Kingdom) Andy Middlehurst	All

== Race calendar and winners ==
All races were held in the United Kingdom.

Round		Circuit	Date	Pole position	Fastest lap	Winning driver	Winning team
1	R1	Silverstone Circuit (National)	1 April	(United Kingdom) Steve Soper	(United Kingdom) Will Hoy	(United Kingdom) Will Hoy	BMW Team Listerine
2	R2	Snetterton Circuit	14 April	(United Kingdom) John Cleland	(United Kingdom) Will Hoy	(United Kingdom) Will Hoy	BMW Team Listerine
3	R3	Donington Park (Grand Prix)	28 April	(United Kingdom) Steve Soper	(United Kingdom) John Cleland	(United Kingdom) Steve Soper	BMW Team Finance
4	R4	Thruxton	27 May	(United Kingdom) Will Hoy	(United Kingdom) Will Hoy	(United Kingdom) John Cleland	Vauxhall Sport
5	R5^{1}	Silverstone Circuit (National)	9 June	(United Kingdom) Tim Sugden	(United Kingdom) Andy Rouse	(United Kingdom) John Cleland	Vauxhall Sport
6	R6	Brands Hatch (Indy)	30 June	(United Kingdom) Tim Sugden	(United Kingdom) Will Hoy	(United Kingdom) Tim Sugden	BMW Team Finance
7	R7	Silverstone Circuit (Grand Prix)	14 July	(United Kingdom) Steve Soper	(United Kingdom) Steve Soper	(United Kingdom) Steve Soper	BMW Team Finance
8	R8	Donington Park (National)	28 July	(United Kingdom) John Cleland	(United Kingdom) Andy Rouse	(United Kingdom) Andy Rouse	Kaliber ICS Team Toyota
8	R9	Donington Park (National)	28 July		(United Kingdom) Ray Bellm	(United Kingdom) Andy Rouse	Kaliber ICS Team Toyota
9	R10	Oulton Park (International)	11 August	(United Kingdom) John Cleland	(United Kingdom) Gary Ayles	(United Kingdom) John Cleland	Vauxhall Sport
10	R11	Brands Hatch (Indy)	26 August	(United Kingdom) Andy Rouse	(United Kingdom) Andy Rouse	(United Kingdom) Andy Rouse	Kaliber ICS Team Toyota
10	R12	Brands Hatch (Indy)	26 August		(United Kingdom) Ray Bellm	(United Kingdom) Will Hoy	BMW Team Listerine
11	R13	Donington Park (Grand Prix)	15 September	(United Kingdom) John Cleland	(United Kingdom) John Cleland	(United Kingdom) John Cleland	Vauxhall Sport
12	R14	Thruxton	22 September	(United Kingdom) Jonathan Palmer	(United Kingdom) Tim Harvey	(United Kingdom) Steve Soper	BMW Team Finance
13	R15	Silverstone Circuit (Grand Prix)	6 October	(United Kingdom) Andy Rouse	(United Kingdom) Tim Harvey	(United Kingdom) Tim Harvey	BMW Team Labatt's

1. – Race was stopped after 10 laps due to heavy rain. The race was not restarted and no points were awarded.

== Championship results ==
=== Drivers Championship ===
Pos	Driver	SIL	SNE	DON	THR	SIL†	BRH	SIL	DON		OUL	BRH		DON	THR	SIL	Pts
1	(United Kingdom) Will Hoy	1	1	Ret	**3**	3	2	2	Ret	DNS	2	2	1	3	Ret	5	**155**
2	(United Kingdom) John Cleland	3	**9**	2	1	1	12	6	**3**	10	**1**	4	3	**1**	8	9	**132**
3	(United Kingdom) Andy Rouse	5	3	9	8	4	3	7	1	**1**	4	**1**	**Ret**	Ret	4	**2**	**115**
4	(United Kingdom) Steve Soper	**18**		**1**				**1**	2	Ret	3	6	Ret		1		**96**
5	(United Kingdom) Ray Bellm	6	2	6	7	5	7	4	6	2	6	14	Ret	4	5	6	**90**
6	(United Kingdom) Jeff Allam	2	4	5	2	2	5	8	5	Ret	Ret	8	Ret	6	10	8	**80**
7	(United Kingdom) Jonathan Palmer	7	Ret	Ret	6	11	6	5	4	3	5	7	6	Ret	**2**	21	**66**
8	(United Kingdom) Tim Harvey	10	7	DSQ	4	7	4	3	Ret	6	7	Ret	5	2	Ret	1	**42**^{1}
9	(United Kingdom) Andy Middlehurst	4	Ret	13	Ret	10	Ret	16	7	7	8	11	4	8	7	3	**41**
10	(United Kingdom) Tim Sugden		Ret			**12**	**1**							5		Ret	**32**
11	(United Kingdom) Robb Gravett	20	13	Ret	14	18	9	Ret	9	4	9	5	2	7	9	13	**28**
12	(United Kingdom) Frank Sytner	DNS	5	3	Ret	6	8	10	Ret	DNS		9	7	Ret			**26**
13	(United Kingdom) Laurence Bristow	Ret	6	7	12	16	10	11	8	5	Ret	Ret	DNS	Ret		7	**20**
14	(United Kingdom) Gary Ayles	9	DSQ	4	Ret	8	Ret	Ret	Ret	DNS	Ret	3	DNS	14	Ret	10	**19**
15	(Germany) Armin Hahne														3		**12**
16	(United Kingdom) David Leslie							9								4	**12**
17	(United Kingdom) Kieth O'dor		Ret	Ret	11	13	15	Ret	10	8	10	Ret	Ret	9	6	11	**10**
18	(Germany) Christian Danner				5												**8**
19	(Sweden) Peggen Andersson	8	8	12			11										**6**
20	(United Kingdom) Dennis Leech	16	14	8	Ret												**3**
21	(United Kingdom) Nick Baird	11	Ret	15	9	14		12	12	9					DNS	17	**2**
22	(United Kingdom) Ian Flux	13		Ret	10	9										14	**1**
23	(United Kingdom) Mark Hales	17	10	16	16	DNS			14	Ret	14	13	Ret	Ret	11	Ret	**1**
24	(Sweden) Nettan Lindgren	19	Ret	10			13	14									**1**
25	(United Kingdom) Nick Whale	14	12	14	13	17			11	Ret	11			10	12	19	**1**
26	(United Kingdom) John Llewellyn											10	Ret				**0**
27	(United Kingdom) Ian Forrest	12	11	11	15	15	14	15	13	NC	12	12	Ret	12	13	22	**0**
28	(United Kingdom) Jeff Wilson										13			11		Ret	**0**
29	(United Kingdom) Julian Bailey													Ret	Ret	12	**0**
30	(United Kingdom) Matt Neal							13			Ret			DNS			**0**
31	(United Kingdom) Valentino Musetti													13			**0**
32	(United Kingdom) Angus MacKay	15	15														**0**
33	(United Kingdom) Dave Brodie											Ret	DNS	DNS	Ret	15	**0**
34	(United Kingdom) Bob Berridge														Ret	16	**0**
35	(United Kingdom) Andrew MacKenzie							17				DNS	DNS				**0**
36	(United Kingdom) Alistair Lyall				DNS			Ret								18	**0**
37	(United Kingdom) Godfrey Hall															20	**0**
—	(United Kingdom) Grahame Davis	DNS	DNS					DNS				Ret	DNS				**0**
—	(United Kingdom) Sean Walker		DNS														**0**
—	(United Kingdom) Tony Bardy														DNS		**0**
—	(United Kingdom) Alistair Fenwick														DNS		**0**
Pos	Driver	SIL	SNE	DON	THR	SIL†	BRH	SIL	DON		OUL	BRH		DON	THR	SIL	Pts

Colour	Result
Gold	Winner
Silver	Second place
Bronze	Third place
Green	Points classification
Blue	Non-points classification
Blue	Non-classified finish (NC)
Purple	Retired, not classified (Ret)
Red	Did not qualify (DNQ)
Red	Did not pre-qualify (DNPQ)
Black	Disqualified (DSQ)
White	Did not start (DNS)
White	Withdrew (WD)
White	Race cancelled (C)
Blank	Did not practice (DNP)
Blank	Did not arrive (DNA)
Blank	Excluded (EX)

- Note: **bold** signifies pole position, italics signifies fastest lap.
1. – Tim Harvey was docked 48 points in round 3 for not keeping within the limits of noise regulations.

† Race was stopped early due to heavy rain, and no points were awarded. Note: Most fastest laps are unknown.

=== Manufacturers Championship ===
Pos	Manufacturer	SIL	SNE	DON	THR	SIL†	BRH	SIL	DON		OUL	BRH		DON	THR	SIL	Pts
1	BMW / BMW Team Listerine/BMW Team Labatt's/BMW Team Finance	1	1	1	3	3	1	1	2	2	2	2	1	2	1	1	134
2	Vauxhall / Vauxhall Sport	2	4	2	1	1	5	6	3	10	1	4	3	1	8	8	116
3	Toyota / Kaliber ICS Team Toyota	5	3	4	8	4	3	7	1	1	4	1	Ret	14	4	2	111
4	Ford / Trakstar Motorsport	4	13	8	14	10	9	16	7	4	8	5	2	7	7	3	102
5	Nissan / Nissan Janspeed Racing		Ret	Ret	11	13	15	Ret	10	8	10	Ret	Ret	9	6	11	53
6	Mitsubishi / John Maguire Racing	17	10	16	16	DNS			14	Ret	14	13	Ret	Ret	11	Ret	45
Pos	Manufacturer	SIL	SNE	DON	THR	SIL†	BRH	SIL	DON		OUL	BRH		DON	THR	SIL	Pts
