= Ray Bellm =

British racing driver (born 1950)

- Nationality: (United Kingdom) British
- Born: Raymond Anthony Bellm; 20 May 1950 (age 76) New Malden, London, England

British Touring Car Championship
- Years active: 1990–1993
- Teams: Hawaiian Tropic; BMW Team Listerine; M Team Shell Racing with Listerine; Team Dynamics
- Starts: 33
- Wins: 0
- Poles: 0
- Fastest laps: 2
- Best finish: 5th in 1991

Championship titles
- 1985, 1986, 1988 1996: World Sportscar Championship - Group C2; BPR International Endurance GT Series

Raymond Anthony Bellm (born 20 May 1950) is a racing driver from the United Kingdom.

== Driving career ==
Bellm began his racing career in 1980, running in historic racing series and winning the British Historic 2-litre GT class in 1983 and 1984 driving his Chevron B19 sports car. He made the move to modern sports car racing in 1984, driving for Gordon Spice. The pair founded Spice Engineering in 1985 and construct Group C chassis.

As part of the Spice team, Bellm would win the World Sportscar C2 Championship in 1985, 1986 and 1988. He was also able to share a Le Mans win with Gordon Spice in each of those three years, before finally leaving the team in 1990.

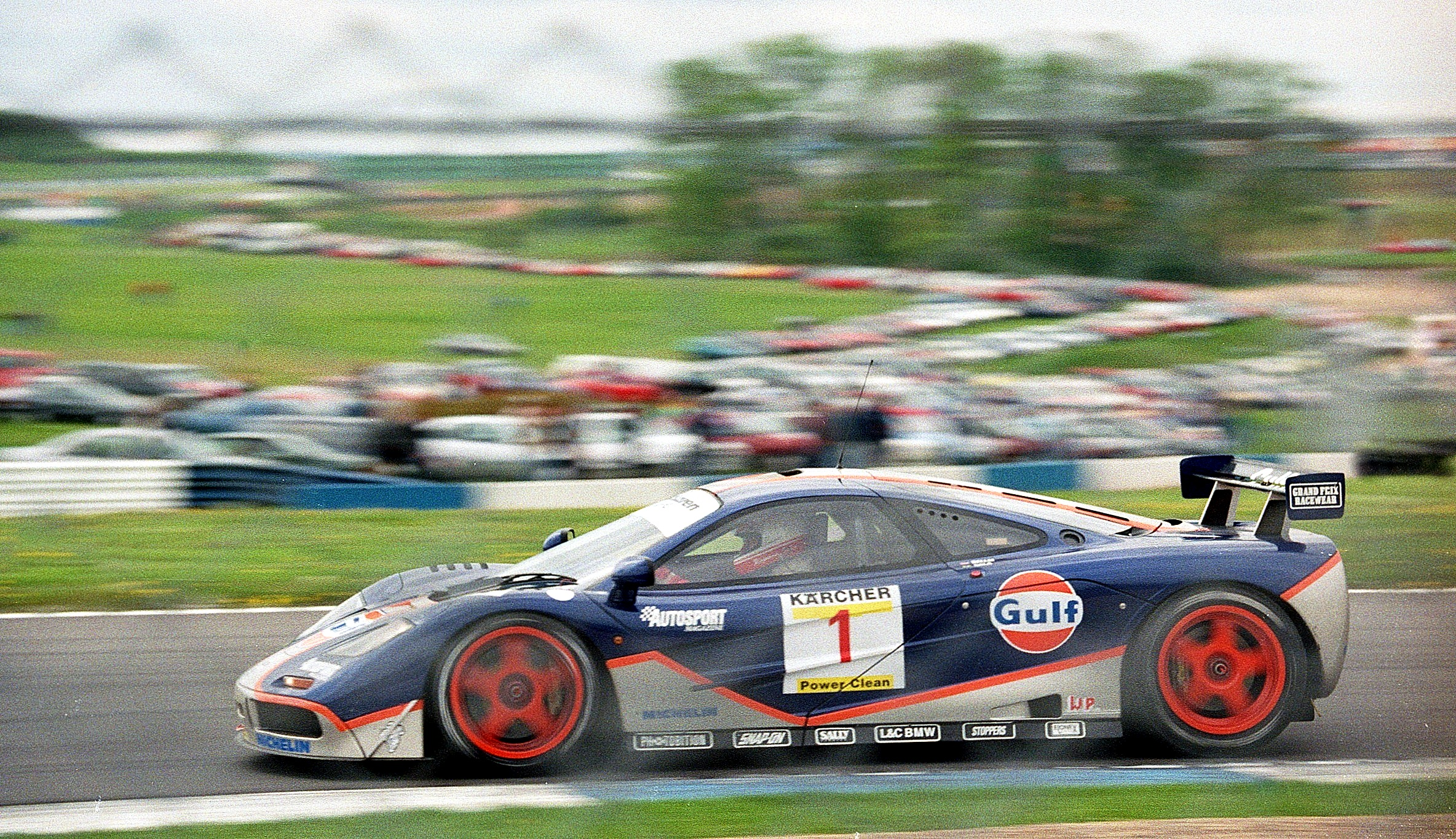
Bellm driving a McLaren F1 GTR at Donington Park during the 1995 BPR Global GT Series.

In the early 1990s, Bellm moved to the British Touring Car Championship, driving for Vic Lee Motorsport, finishing fifth overall in 1991. Following Lee's arrest and imprisonment for drug trafficking, Bellm and Steve Neal co-founded Team Dynamics in 1993, eventually selling his share in the company to Neal. He won the International GT championship in 1994, and the BPR Global GT Series in 1996 driving a McLaren F1 GTR to 11 wins in two years. He also won the 1991 Willhire 24 Hour at Snetterton in a BMW M3 co-driven with Kurt Luby and Will Hoy.

Since then, Bellm has returned to historics, including running the Le Mans Classic in 2004 and 2006. He also turned to rallying coming sixth in the 2000 London-Sydney Rally and in 2005 won three rounds of the British Historic Rally Championship in a Mk1 Ford Escort. In 2005, he contested the British round of the World Rally Championship in Group N classed car finishing seventh. In 2006, he finished sixth in Finland and twelfth in Rally Great Britain.

Bellm has served as chairman of the British Racing Drivers' Club (BRDC) from 2004 to 2005, and was responsible for negotiations with Formula One Management which resulted in the successful resigning of the British Grand Prix in 2005.

Bellm also owned and ran the Silverstone based motorsport equipment retailer, Grand Prix Racewear, having bought a majority stake in 1994.

In 2011, Bellm started the 106 Drivers Club, an event based company to run social road car tours for owners of the iconic 3 seater McLaren F1. Celebrating milestone anniversaries, the 20th and 25th anniversaries attracted 22 chassis of the 103 that remain.

== Racing record ==
=== 24 Hours of Le Mans results ===
(key)

Year	Team	Co-Drivers	Car	Class	Laps	Pos.	Class Pos.
1984	(United Kingdom) Spice-Tiga Racing	(United Kingdom) Gordon Spice (Australia) Neil Crang	Tiga GC84-Ford Cosworth	C2	69	DNF	DNF
1985	(United Kingdom) Spice Engineering	(United Kingdom) Gordon Spice (Republic of Ireland) Mark Galvin	Spice-Tiga GC85-Ford Cosworth	C2	312	14th	**1st**
1986	(United Kingdom) Spice Engineering	(United Kingdom) Gordon Spice (Belgium) Jean-Michel Martin	Spice SE86C-Ford Cosworth	C2	257	19th	6th
1988	(United Kingdom) Spice Engineering	(United Kingdom) Gordon Spice (France) Pierre de Thoisy	Spice SE88C-Ford Cosworth	C2	351	13th	**1st**
1989	(United Kingdom) Spice Engineering	(United Kingdom) Gordon Spice (United States) Lyn St. James	Spice SE89C-Ford Cosworth	C1	229	DNF	DNF
1994	(United Kingdom) Bristow Racing (Norway) Erik Henriksen	(United Kingdom) Harry Nuttall (United Kingdom) Charles Rickett	Porsche 911 Carrera RSR	GT2	34	DNF	DNF
1995	(United Kingdom) GTC Gulf Racing	(United Kingdom) Mark Blundell (Brazil) Maurizio Sandro Sala	McLaren F1 GTR	GT1	291	4th	**3rd**
1996	(United Kingdom) Gulf Racing (United Kingdom) GTC Racing	(United Kingdom) James Weaver (Finland) JJ Lehto	McLaren F1 GTR	GT1	323	9th	7th
1997	(United Kingdom) Gulf Team Davidoff (United Kingdom) GTC Racing	(United Kingdom) Andrew Gilbert-Scott (Japan) Masanori Sekiya	McLaren F1 GTR	GT1	326	DNF	DNF

=== Complete British Touring Car Championship results ===
(key) (Races in bold indicate pole position – 1990 in class) (Races in italics indicate fastest lap)

Year	Team	Car	Class	1	2	3	4	5	6	7	8	9	10	11	12	13	14	15	16	17	DC	Pts	Class
1990	Hawaiian Tropic	Ford Sierra Sapphire	B	OUL ovr:10 cls:6	DON; Ret	THR; DNS	SIL; DNS	OUL	SIL; DNP	BRH	SNE	BRH	BIR; DNA	DON; DNS	THR	SIL					32nd	6	20th
1991	BMW Team Listerine	BMW M3		SIL; 6	SNE; 2	DON; 6	THR; 7	SIL; 5^{1}	BRH; 7	SIL; 4	DON; 1; 6	DON; 2; 2	OUL; 6	BRH; 1; 14	BRH; 2 Ret	DON; 4	THR; 5	SIL; 6			5th	90	
1992	M Team Shell Racing with Listerine	BMW 318is		SIL; 9	THR; Ret	OUL; 10	SNE; 12	BRH; Ret	DON; 1; 7	DON; 2; 10	SIL; 6	KNO; 1; 6	KNO; 2; 8	PEM; DNS	BRH; 1	BRH; 2	DON	SIL			13th	15	
1993	Team Dynamics	BMW 318is		SIL	DON; Ret	SNE; DNS	DON; 18	OUL	BRH; 1; 13	BRH; 2; 12	PEM; 17	SIL; 14	KNO; 1	KNO; 2	OUL	BRH	THR	DON; 1	DON; 2	SIL	29th	0	
Sources:

1. – Race was stopped due to heavy rain. No points were awarded.

Sporting positions
Preceded by Thomas Bscher; John Nielsen	BPR Global GT Series; Champion; 1996 with: James Weaver	Succeeded by Bernd Schneider (FIA GT Championship)
