= Nick Whale =

British racing driver (born 1963)

- Nationality: (United Kingdom) British
- Born: Nicholas Andrew Whale; 4 March 1963 (age 63) Birmingham, West Midlands, England

British Touring Car Championship
- Years active: 1988, 1990–1991
- Teams: Chris Hodgetts Motor Sport; Pyramid Motorsport; Techspeed Racing
- Starts: 23
- Wins: 0
- Poles: 0
- Fastest laps: 0
- Best finish: 17th in 1990

Nicholas Andrew Whale (born 4 March 1963) is a British racing driver. He currently competes in historic rallying and FIA historic saloon racing events. He runs Iconic Auctions (formally Silverstone Auctions), Classic Car Auctions, Automotive Auctions and Nick Whale Motorhomes. He was a main board director of both the BRDC and the MSA and also a trustee and a Director of the Midlands Air Ambulance.

== Career ==
Whale started his racing career in 1980 by hillclimbing and sprinting a Mallock U2 and progressed to saloon car track racing in 1986. In 1988, he won his class at the Willhire 24 Hour race. In 1989 Whale won the Uniroyal British Production Saloon Championship (class B) in a BMW M3. For 1990, he stepped up to the British Touring Car Championship as teammate to Godfrey Hall and John Clark driving for Pyramid Motorsport in a BMW M3, finishing the year in 17th place overall. He returned for a second season in 1991 for Tech-Speed Motorsport as teammate to Nick Baird and later in the season, Matt Neal. He then went on to race in Thundersaloons in a Toyota Supra and Vauxhall Calibra, and British GT's in a variety of Porsches, until retiring from modern motorsport in 1996.

Whale then ran the 'Works' TVR team for the factory in British GT's and FIA European events for the '97 and '98 season with Mark Hales and Phil Andrews driving. He then returned to driving again in both the GT Cup and in historic motorsport.

In 1999, WHale took up historic rallying and became the '99 Safety Devices Historic Champion and in 2000 became the first MSA British Historic Rally Champion in a '73 Porsche 911 RS ~ both with Nick Kennedy as co-driver.

Since then, Whale has raced in FIA historic saloons throughout Europe, GT's and Sports cars, as well as Can-Am sportscars all over the world. He won the St. Mary's Trophy in a Ford Mustang at the Goodwood Revival in 2000 (finishing second in 2007 in a Mercury Comet Cyclone) and has finished in the top-six of the Goodwood TT in a steel bodied E-Type (CUT 7) and second in the Whitsun Trophy in a Mclaren M1B several times. In more recent times, he has raced his original ex BTCC BMW M3 with his son Harry and is now rallying a Mk II Ford escort in the MSV/Motorsport News tarmac rally series, as well as an original FIA Ford Escort MkI RS1600 on the International historic racing scene.

== Racing record ==
=== Complete British Touring Car Championship results ===
(key) Races in bold indicate pole position (1982-1984 in class) Races in italics indicate fastest lap.

Year	Team	Car	Class	1	2	3	4	5	6	7	8	9	10	11	12	13	14	15	Pos.	Pts	Class
1988	Chris Hodgetts Motor Sport	Toyota Corolla GT	D	SIL	OUL	THR	DON	THR	SIL	SIL	BRH	SNE	BRH	BIR; C	DON	SIL			NC	0	NC
1990	Pyramid Motorsport	BMW M3	B	OUL; DSQ	DON ovr:8 cls:3	THR ovr:13 cls:6	SIL	OUL ovr:14 cls:6	SIL ovr:14 cls:7	BRH ovr:13 cls:10	SNE; Ret	BRH ovr:16 cls:10	BIR ovr:11 cls:6	DON ovr:13 cls:7	THR; Ret	SIL ovr:14 cls:8			17th	43	10th
1991	Auto Trader Techspeed Team	BMW M3		SIL; 14	SNE; 12	DON; 14	THR; 13	SIL†; 17	BRH	SIL	DON; 1; 11	DON; 2 Ret	OUL; 11	BRH; 1	BRH; 2	DON; 10	THR; 12	SIL; 19	25th	0	

† Race was stopped early due to heavy rain, and no points were awarded.

=== 24 Hours of Silverstone results ===
Year	Team	Co-Drivers	Car	Car No.	Class	Laps	Pos.	Class Pos.
2012	(United Kingdom) GP Motorsport	(United Kingdom) Guy Povey (United Kingdom) Harry Whale (United Kingdom) Westlie Harding (Sweden) Freddy Nordström	BMW M3 E46 GTR	70	3	297	25th/DNF	7th/DNF
