= Ray Armes =

British racing driver and businessman (born 1951)

- Nationality: (United Kingdom) British
- Born: 27 December 1951 (age 74)

British Touring Car Championship
- Years active: 1989–1990
- Teams: PG Tags Racing
- Starts: 19
- Wins: 0 (5 in class)
- Poles: 0 (7 in class)
- Fastest laps: 0 (6 in class)
- Best finish: 13th in 1989

Raymond Leslie Armes (born 27 December 1951) is a British former auto racing driver and businessman.

== Career ==
Armes is best known for competing in the British Touring Car Championship. In 1989, he finished third in class and thirteenth overall, despite only competing for half the season. Armes drove a PG Tips-sponsored class D Honda Civic Si, built by Trakstar Motorsport. In 1990, he continued with the Civic, running in the new super touring class, but could not repeat his form of the previous year, and he departed the series at the end of the season.

Armes has also competed in the Rover GTi Championship, National Saloon Car Cup, Volkswagen Vento VR6 Challenge, the Porsche Cup, and the MGF Cup. In 1997, he competed in the opening three rounds of the British GT Championship for Lucent Millennium with a Marcos LM600 alongside Nick Carr.

Armes was chairman of marketing agency Vibrandt, famously revamping the classic Heinz Tomato Ketchup label before later leaving the company to establish and become CEO of advertising consultancy Touch of Mojo, whose clients include Unilever and Clark's shoes. The company sponsored the Volkswagen Golf championship in 2013.

== Racing record ==
=== Complete British Touring Car Championship results ===
(key) Races in bold indicate pole position. Races in italics indicate fastest lap (1 point awarded – 1987–1989 in class)

Year	Team	Car	Class	1	2	3	4	5	6	7	8	9	10	11	12	13	DC	Pts	Class
1989	PG Tags Racing	Honda Civic Si	D	OUL	SIL	THR	DON	THR	SIL	**SIL** ovr:25 cls:1	**BRH** ovr:17 cls:1	**SNE** ovr:19 cls:1	**BRH**; Ret	**BIR**; Ret	**DON** ovr:21 cls:1	**SIL** ovr:21 cls:1	13th	31	**3rd**
1990	PG Tags Racing	Honda Civic	B	OUL; Ret	DON ovr:12 cls:7	THR ovr:16 cls:9	SIL; Ret	OUL; Ret	SIL; Ret	BRH; Ret	SNE	BRH ovr:18 cls:12	BIR ovr:16 cls:11	DON ovr:17 cls:11	THR ovr:14 cls:9	SIL; Ret	31st	7	19th
