= John Llewellyn (racing driver) =

British racing driver (born 1954)

John Llewellyn (born 4 January 1954) is a British former auto racing driver. He competed regularly in the British Touring Car Championship and the Willhire 24 Hour endurance race. His last BTCC appearance came in 1991 for Tech-Speed Motorsport. Since retiring from racing, he has been involved in running corporate-hospitality companies.

== Racing record ==
=== Complete British Touring Car Championship results ===
(key) (Races in bold indicate pole position in class) (Races in italics indicate fastest lap in class - 1 point awarded all races)

Year	Team	Car	Class	1	2	3	4	5	6	7	8	9	10	11	12	13	14	15	DC	Pts	Class
1988	Demon Tweeks	Volkswagen Golf GTI	C	SIL	OUL	THR	DON; Ret‡	THR	SIL										NC	0	NC
1988	MIL Motorsport	Toyota Corolla	D							SIL; Ret	BRH ovr:20 cls:3	SNE ovr:18 cls:3	BRH ovr:19 cls:3	BIR; C	DON ovr:23 cls:3	SIL ovr:16 cls:3			17th	20	4th
1989	BRR Motorsport	BMW M3	B	OUL ovr:14 cls:4	SIL ovr:24 cls:5	THR ovr:26 cls:6	DON ovr:7 cls:2	THR ovr:13 cls:3	SIL ovr:16 cls:3	SIL ovr:19 cls:5	BRH ovr:12 cls:3	SNE ovr:15 cls:4	BRH ovr:21 cls:6	BIR ovr:14 cls:4	DON ovr:15 cls:4	SIL ovr:14 cls:4			9th	37	**3rd**
1990	Ecosse Motorsport	BMW M3	B	OUL	DON	THR	SIL	OUL	SIL	BRH	SNE ovr:13 cls:8	BRH	BIR	DON	THR	SIL			34th	3	22nd
1991	Auto Trader Techspeed Team	BMW M3		SIL	SNE	DON	THR	SIL	BRH	SIL	DON; 1	DON; 2	OUL	BRH; 1; 10	BRH; 2 Ret	DON	THR	SIL	NC	0	

‡ Endurance driver.
