= Kurt Luby =

British racing driver (born 1963)

- Nationality: (United Kingdom) British
- Born: Kurt Gerrard Luby; 6 March 1963 (age 63) Bolton, Lancashire, England

British Touring Car Championship
- Years active: 1990, 2001
- Teams: BMW Team Finance; ABG Motorsport
- Starts: 16
- Wins: 0 (4 in class)
- Poles: 0
- Fastest laps: 0 (3 in class)
- Best finish: 9th in 2001

Kurt Gerrard Luby (born 6 March 1963 in Bolton, Lancashire) is a British former racing driver who now works as a motorcycle dealer in his hometown of Bolton. He first entered racing through karting in 1978, winning seven championships up to 1987. In 1987, he won the British Formula Ford 1600 series, winning the championship that year and then defending his title in 1988. He switched to the Formula Vauxhall Lotus Championship in 1989, finishing second on points. A year later, he was third in the championship. After moving to saloon car racing, he was second in the 1991 National Saloon Championship Group N, driving a BMW M3. That same year, he won the Willhire 24 Hours with Will Hoy and Ray Bellm. His final championship title was in the 1998 British GT in a GT2 class Chrysler Viper GTS-R alongside Richard Dean.

Luby is best known for his brief time in the British Touring Car Championship. His first year was in 1990, racing for the BMW Junior Team. He drove in seven races with five wins and two-second places in his class, finishing thirteenth in the final standings. His second year in the BTCC didn't come until 2001. He only raced in the first part of the season in a Lexus IS200 for ABG Motorsport, finishing ninth in the championship in what was a small field of drivers.

== Racing record ==
=== Complete British Touring Car Championship results ===
(key) (Races in bold indicate pole position - 1 point awarded all races in 2001 only) (Races in italics indicate fastest lap - 1 point awarded - 1 point awarded all races) (* signifies that driver lead feature race for at least one lap - 1 point awarded in 2001 only)

Year	Team	Car	Class	1	2	3	4	5	6	7	8	9	10	11	12	13	14	15	16	17	18	19	20	21	22	23	24	25	26	Overall DC	Pts	Class
1990	BMW Team Finance	BMW M3	B	OUL	DON ovr:Ret/6‡ cls:Ret/1‡	THR ovr:11 cls:4	SIL	OUL	SIL ovr:8 cls:1	BRH ovr:4‡ cls:1‡	SNE	BRH ovr:10 cls:4	BIR ovr:6 cls:1	DON	THR ovr:16 cls:11	SIL														13th	60	7th
2001	ABG Motorsport	Lexus IS200	T	BRH; 1	BRH; 2	THR; 1 Ret	THR; 2 ovr:6 cls:5	OUL; 1 ovr:20 cls:8	OUL; 2 ovr:5 cls:4	SIL; 1 ovr:15 cls:7	SIL; 2 ovr:5 cls:5	MON; 1 ovr:8 cls:4	MON; 2 Ret	DON; 1 Ret	DON; 2 DNS	KNO; 1	KNO; 2	SNE; 1	SNE; 2	CRO; 1	CRO; 2	OUL; 1	OUL; 2	SIL; 1	SIL; 2	DON; 1	DON; 2	BRH; 1	BRH; 2	9th	33	

‡ Endurance driver - not eligible for points

=== Complete British GT Championship results ===
(key) (Races in bold indicate pole position) (Races in italics indicate fastest lap)

Year	Team	Car	Class	1	2	3	4	5	6	7	8	9	10	11	12	Pos	Points
2000	Marcos Racing International	Marcos Mantara LM600	GT	THR; 1	CRO; 1	OUL; 1 WD	DON; 1	SIL; 1	BRH; 1	DON; 1	CRO; 1 DNS	SIL; 1	SNE; 1	SPA; 1	SIL; 1	NC	0
