= Sean Walker (racing driver) =

British racing driver (born 1958)

Sean Walker (born 24 March 1958) is a British former racing driver. He stopped racing in 2013. His father Ian Walker (1926–2008) was noted as the "Doyen of British Motorsport" (Ref The Independent 18 July 2008) was a driver, engineer and designer/modifier of race cars particularly Lotus. Ian Walker's cars were driven by famous drivers such as Jim Clark, Graham Hill and Peter Arundell.

== Racing career ==
Sean Walker's racing career.

2010

HSCC Derek Bell Trophy Position: no position ? races. 0 wins. 0 pole positions. 0 podiums. 0 fastest laps. Car: March 782 Complete results needed.

2009

HSCC Lloyds TSB Derek Bell Trophy Position: 11 (20 points) 2 races. 2 wins. 1 pole position. 2 podiums. 2 fastest laps. Car: March 782

1992

RAC Esso British Touring Car Championship Position: 19 (4 points) 13 races. 0 wins. 0 pole positions. 0 podiums. 0 fastest laps. Team: Techspeed Racing Car: BMW M3

1990

RAC Esso British Touring Car Championship Position: 7 (96 points) ? races. 0 wins. ? pole positions. ? podiums. ? fastest laps. Car: Ford Sierra RS500 Complete results needed.

1989

RAC Esso British Touring Car Championship Position: 21 (17 points) 13 races. 0 wins. 0 pole positions. 0 podiums. 0 fastest laps. Team: FAI Auto Parts Car: Ford Sierra RS500 Cosworth

British Touring Car Championship - class A Position: no position ? races. ? wins. ? pole positions. ? podiums. ? fastest laps. Complete results needed.

1988

World Sports-Prototype Championship Position: no position 2 races. 0 wins. 0 pole positions. 0 podiums. 0 fastest laps. Team: Sean Walker Car: Tiga GC287 (Ford)

Formula 3 Britain National Class Position: 17 (4 points) 1 race. 0 wins. 0 pole positions. 1 podium. 0 fastest laps. Team: Techspeed Racing Car: Reynard 873 (Volkswagen)

1987

World Sports-Prototype Championship Position: no position 1 race. 0 wins. 0 pole positions. 0 podiums. 0 fastest laps. Team: URD Junior Car: URD C81 (BMW)

1986

Formula 3 Britain National Class Position: 2 (76 points) 17 races. 4 wins. 2 pole positions. 11 podiums. 1 fastest lap. Team: Techspeed Racing Car: Ralt RT30 (Volkswagen)

1985

Formula 3 Britain National Class Position: 10 (15 points) 2 races. 1 win. 1 pole position. 2 podiums. 2 fastest laps. Team: Richard Dutton Racing Car: Ralt RT3 (Volkswagen)

== Racing record ==
=== Complete British Touring Car Championship results ===
(key) (Races in bold indicate pole position – 1988–1990 in class) (Races in italics indicate fastest lap – 1 point awarded ?–1989 in class)

Year	Team	Car	Class	1	2	3	4	5	6	7	8	9	10	11	12	13	14	15	DC	Pts	Class
1989	FAI Auto Parts	Ford Sierra RS500	A	OUL ovr:5 cls:5	SIL; NC	THR ovr:4 cls:4	DON ovr:4 cls:4	THR ovr:6 cls:6	SIL ovr:5 cls:5	SIL ovr:9 cls:9	BRH; Ret	SNE ovr:6 cls:6	BRH ovr:4 cls:4	BIR ovr:8 cls:8	DON ovr:5 cls:5	SIL ovr:8 cls:8			21st	17	5th
1990	FAI Auto Parts	Ford Sierra RS500	A	OUL; Ret	DON ovr:4 cls:4	THR ovr:5 cls:5	SIL ovr:2 cls:2	OUL ovr:4 cls:4	SIL; Ret	BRH ovr:3 cls:3	SNE ovr:4 cls:4	BRH ovr:4 cls:4	BIR ovr:2 cls:2	DON ovr:6 cls:6	THR; Ret	SIL; Ret			7th	96	4th
1991	Sean Walker Racing	Ford Sierra RS500		SIL	SNE; DNS	DON	THR	SIL	BRH	SIL	DON; 1	DON; 2	OUL	BRH; 1	BRH; 2	DON	THR	SIL	NC	0	
1992	Techspeed Racing	BMW M3		SIL; 13	THR; 11	OUL; 15	SNE; 10	BRH; 14	DON; 1; 15	DON; 2 Ret	SIL; Ret	KNO; 1	KNO; 2	PEM; 8	BRH; 1; 14	BRH; 2; 14	DON; 12	SIL; 14	20th	4	

== Personal life ==
Walker is married to Karen, an ex model and fashion buyer, formerly for the Arcadia Group. She is an acclaimed, award-winning. visual art photographic artist, under the name Honey J Walker. He suffered a serious stroke in 2014 and only survived without excessive brain damage because of his wife, Karen's early intervention.

They have three children, two grandchildren and three dogs.
