= Jeremy Rossiter =

British racing driver (born 1950)

- Nationality: (United Kingdom) British
- Born: Jeremy Stuart Rossiter; 18 June 1950 (age 76) Oxford, Oxfordshire, England

British Touring Car Championship
- Years active: 1988–1990
- Teams: North Essex Motorsport; Vauxhall Motorsport; PG Tags Racing
- Starts: 10
- Wins: 0
- Poles: 0
- Fastest laps: 0
- Best finish: 17th in 1989

Jeremy Stuart Rossiter (born 18 June 1950) is a British racing driver. He has competed in various forms of motorsports including single-seater, sports cars and saloon cars. In 1989, he drove for the works Vauxhall team in the British Touring Car Championship.

Rossiter's eldest son James is a former racing driver who has been a Formula One test driver and Formula E team principal.

== Racing record ==
=== Complete British Touring Car Championship results ===
(key) (Races in bold indicate pole position – 1988–1990 in class) (Races in italics indicate fastest lap – 1 point awarded ?–1989 in class)

Year	Team	Car	Class	1	2	3	4	5	6	7	8	9	10	11	12	13	DC	Pts	Class
1988	North Essex Motorsport	Ford Escort RS1600i	D	SIL	OUL	THR	DON	THR	SIL	SIL ovr:22 cls:4	BRH	SNE	BRH	BIR	DON	SIL	47th	3	14th
1989	Vauxhall Motorsport	Vauxhall Astra GTE 16v	C	OUL	SIL	THR	DON	THR	SIL	SIL ovr:23 cls:3	BRH ovr:16 cls:3	SNE ovr:18 cls:3	BRH; Ret	BIR ovr:18 cls:3	DON ovr:19 cls:3	SIL ovr:22 cls:2	17th	26	4th
1990	PG Tags Racing	Honda Civic	B	OUL	DON ovr:12‡ cls:7‡	THR	SIL	OUL	SIL	BRH; Ret‡	SNE	BRH	BIR	DON	THR	SIL	NC	0	NC

‡ Endurance driver (ineligible for points).
