= Laurence Bristow =

British racing driver (born 1952)

- Nationality: (United Kingdom) British
- Born: 18 July 1952 (age 74) Butleigh, Somerset, England

British Touring Car Championship
- Years active: 1988–1992
- Teams: CAM Shipping; Labatt's Team; BMW Team Labatt's; Bristow Motorsport
- Starts: 53
- Wins: 1
- Poles: 0
- Fastest laps: 1
- Best finish: 9th in 1990

Laurence Alan Bristow (born 18 July 1952) is a British racing driver and businessman, best known for his time in the British Touring Car Championship. He is son of helicopter magnate Alan Bristow.

== Racing career ==
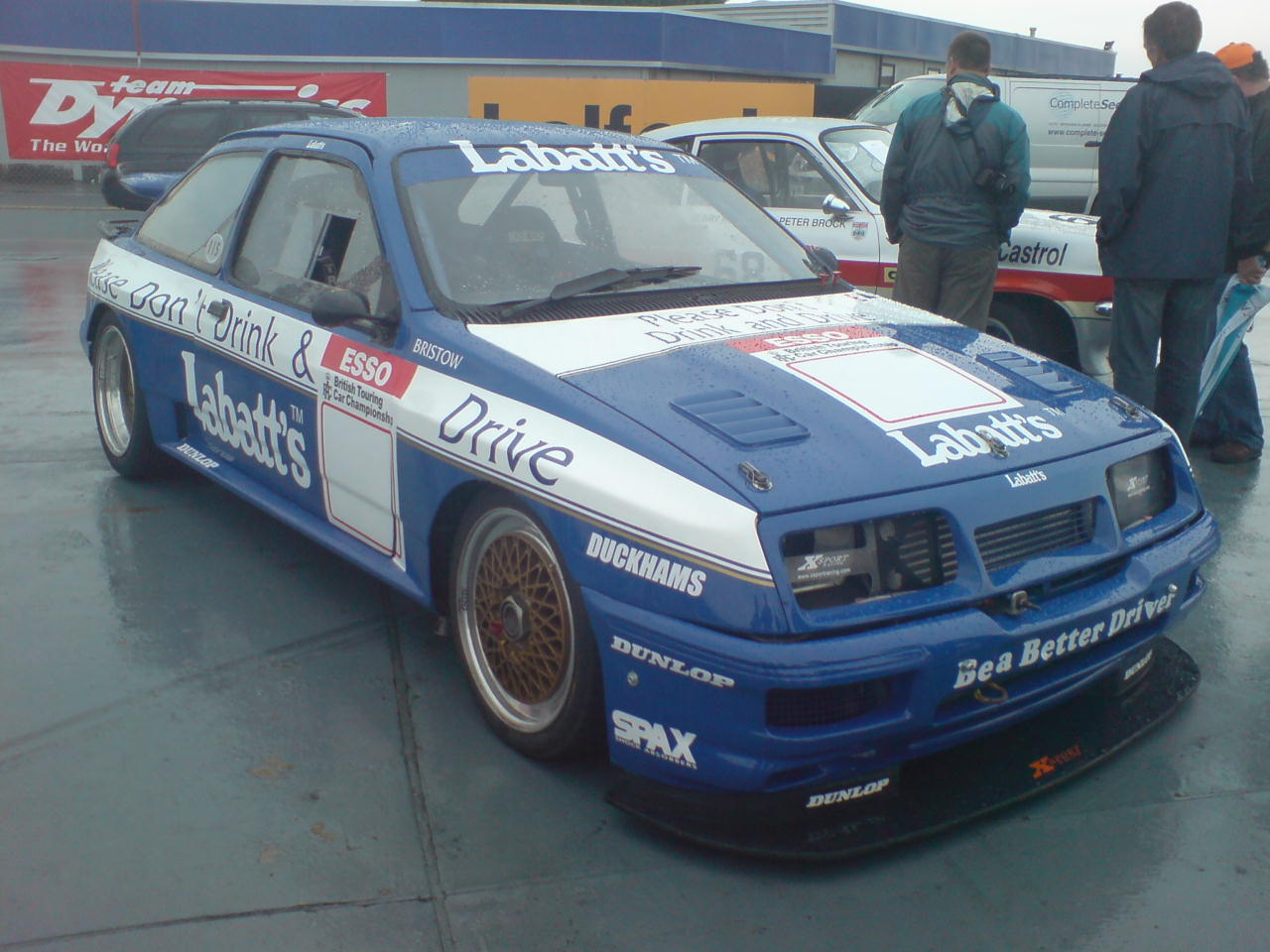
Laurence Bristow's BTCC Labatts Team Ford Sierra RS500. At 2008 BTCC 50th anniversary

Bristow first started racing in 1985 when he entered the MG Metro Challenge. In 1986, he progressed to the International MG Metro Challenge. In 1987, he raced in the Uniroyal Production Car Championship driving a Ford Sierra RS500 where he finished second in class. A year later, he stepped up to the BTCC, again driving a class A Ford Sierra RS500. In 1989, he drove for the Labatts team along with team mate Tim Harvey. That year, he got his only BTCC win along with Tiff Needell at the Donington Park 1 hour endurance race. Bristow got his highest championship finish of ninth in 1990. When the BTCC switched to the single Super Touring class in 1991, the Labatts team changed to a BMW M3 for two more years with Bristow.

Other racing in 1989 included the British Sportscar Championship and the 24 hours of Le Mans. The 1991 season was split between the BTCC and the Thundersaloon championship, which Bristow won. In 1993 he left the BTCC and raced in the Thundersaloons full time, back in a Ford Sierra. He is now director of Bristow Helicopters, following in his father's footsteps.

== Racing record ==
=== Complete British Touring Car Championship results ===
(key) (Races in bold indicate pole position – 1988–1990 in class) (Races in italics indicate fastest lap – 1 point awarded ?–1989 in class)

Year	Team	Car	Class	1	2	3	4	5	6	7	8	9	10	11	12	13	14	15	DC	Pts	Class
1988	CAM Shipping	Ford Sierra RS500	A	SIL; Ret	OUL; Ret	THR ovr:17 cls:8	DON ovr:2 cls:2	THR; Ret	SIL ovr:4 cls:4	SIL ovr:3 cls:3	BRH ovr:4 cls:4	SNE; Ret	BRH; Ret	BIR; C	DON ovr:14 cls:11	SIL ovr:3 cls:3			16th	21	7th
1989	Labatt's Team	Ford Sierra RS500	A	OUL; NC	SIL ovr:3 cls:3	THR; Ret	DON ovr:1 cls:1	THR ovr:18 cls:12	SIL ovr:6 cls:6	SIL ovr:5 cls:5	BRH ovr:6 cls:6	SNE ovr:5 cls:5	BRH ovr:2 cls:2	BIR ovr:3 cls:3	DON ovr:10 cls:10	SIL ovr:4 cls:4			12th	32	4th
1990	Labatt's Team	Ford Sierra RS500	A	OUL ovr:3 cls:3	DON ovr:3 cls:3	THR ovr:4 cls:4	SIL ovr:4 cls:4	OUL ovr:5 cls:5	SIL ovr:4 cls:4	BRH; Ret	SNE ovr:3 cls:3	BRH ovr:5 cls:5	BIR; Ret	DON; Ret	THR; Ret	SIL ovr:6 cls:6			9th	88	5th
1991	BMW Team Labatt's	BMW M3		SIL; Ret	SNE; 6	DON; 7	THR; 12	SIL; 16^{1}	BRH; 10	SIL; 11	DON; 1; 8	DON; 2; 5	OUL; Ret	BRH; 1 Ret	BRH; 2 DNS	DON; Ret	THR	SIL; 7	13th	20	
1992	Bristow Motorsport	BMW M3		SIL; 17	THR	OUL	SNE	BRH	DON; 1	DON; 2	SIL; 12	KNO; 1	KNO; 2	PEM; DNS	BRH; 1	BRH; 2	DON	SIL	NC	0	

1. – Race was stopped due to heavy rain. No points were awarded.

=== Complete European Touring Car Championship results ===
(key) (Races in bold indicate pole position) (Races in italics indicate fastest lap)

Year	Team	Car	1	2	3	4	5	6	7	8	9	10	11	DC	Pts
1988	(United Kingdom) Baynard Cars Ltd	Ford Sierra RS500	MNZ	DON	EST	JAR	DIJ	VAL	NÜR	SPA	ZOL	SIL; 9	NOG	NC	0
