= Godfrey Hall =

Godfrey Hall may refer to:

- pseudonym of Godfrey Ho (born 1948), former Hong Kong–based film director and screenwriter
- Godfrey Hall (racing driver) (born 1949), British auto racing driver
