= Nick Baird (racing driver) =

British racing driver (born 1955)

- Nationality: (United Kingdom) British
- Born: Nicholas Baird; 11 January 1955 (age 71) Birmingham, West Midlands, England

British Touring Car Championship
- Years active: 2
- Teams: Techspeed Motorsport
- Starts: 19
- Wins: 0
- Poles: 0
- Fastest laps: 0
- Best finish: 21st in 1991

Nicholas Baird (born 11 January 1955) is a British auto racing driver.

== Career ==
Baird competed in the British Sports 2000 Championship between 1986 and 1988, winning the best newcomer award in his debut season. In 1988, he finished second overall, winning his class. For 1989, he competed in the British Sportscar Championship. In 1990, he stepped up to the British Touring Car Championship, driving a BMW 318is he finished 22nd overall. He returned for a second season in 1991, driving for Tech-Speed Motorsport he finished 21st with two championship points.

== Racing record ==
=== Complete British Touring Car Championship results ===
(key) (Races in bold indicate pole position – 1990 in class) (Races in italics indicate fastest lap)

Year	Team	Car	Class	1	2	3	4	5	6	7	8	9	10	11	12	13	14	15	DC	Pts	Class
1990	Techspeed Motorsport	BMW 318is	B	OUL ovr:11 cls:7	DON; NC	THR ovr:15 cls:8	SIL ovr:15 cls:9	OUL; Ret	SIL ovr:15 cls:8	BRH	SNE ovr:14 cls:9	BRH	BIR; DNS	DON ovr:16 cls:10	THR ovr:18 cls:13	SIL ovr:17 cls:10			22nd	16	14th
1991	Auto Trader Techspeed Team	BMW M3		SIL; 11	SNE; Ret	DON; 15	THR; 9	SIL; 14	BRH	SIL; 12	DON; 1; 12	DON; 2; 9	OUL	BRH; 1	BRH; 2	DON	THR; DNS	SIL; 17	21st	2	
