= Nettan Lindgren-Jansson =

Swedish racing driver (born 1957)

- Nationality: (Sweden) Swedish
- Born: 13 March 1957 (age 69) Grödinge, Sweden

British Touring Car Championship
- Years active: 1989–1991
- Teams: BMW Team Sweden
- Starts: 22
- Wins: 0 (1 in class)
- Poles: 0
- Fastest laps: 0
- Best finish: 10th in 1990

Championship titles
- 1985, 1986, 1987, 1988: Lancia Lady Cup Sweden

Mona Anette Lindgren-Jansson, known as Nettan Lindgren-Jansson (born 13 March 1957, in Grödinge) is a Swedish racing driver. She is best known for her time competing in the British Touring Car Championship, taking a solitary class victory at Thruxton in 1990 at the wheel of a BMW M3.

== Racing career ==
Lindgren started racing in 1973 in karting, before moving on to Swedish Formula Ford. In 1980, she competed in the Swedish Sports 2000 Championship. From 1981, she raced in both the Swedish and Finnish Formula 3 Championships and was Lancia Lady Cup Sweden champion in 1985, 1986, 1987 and 1988.

Lindgren competed in the BTCC for three seasons between 1989 and 1991, all in a BMW M3. She gained notoriety in 1991 when on-board TV cameras caught her confronting Jonathan Palmer in his stranded car following a collision between the two at Snetterton. Lindgren later went on to compete in the Swedish Touring Car Championship.

== Racing record ==
=== Complete British Touring Car Championship results ===
(key) (Races in bold indicate pole position in class) (Races in italics indicate fastest lap in class - 1 point awarded all races)

Year	Team	Car	Class	1	2	3	4	5	6	7	8	9	10	11	12	13	14	15	DC	Pts	Class
1989	Nettan Lindgren	BMW M3	B	OUL; NC	SIL ovr:17 cls:3	THR	DON	THR	SIL	SIL ovr:18 cls:4	BRH ovr:13 cls:4	SNE ovr:23 cls:5	BRH ovr:19 cls:4	BIR; Ret	DON	SIL			25th	12	6th
1990	BMW Team Sweden	BMW M3	B	OUL ovr:8 cls:4	DON ovr:9 cls:4	THR	SIL	OUL; Ret	SIL ovr:13 cls:6	BRH ovr:7 cls:4	SNE	BRH ovr:11 cls:5	BIR ovr:10 cls:5	DON ovr:10 cls:4	THR ovr:5 cls:1	SIL; Ret			10th	82	5th
1991	BMW Team Sweden	BMW M3		SIL; 19	SNE; Ret	DON; 10	THR	SIL	BRH; 13	SIL; 14	DON; 1	DON; 2	OUL	BRH; 1	BRH; 2	DON	THR	SIL	24th	1	
