= Andy Middlehurst =

British racing driver (born 1962)

- Nationality: (United Kingdom) British
- Born: Andrew Michael Middlehurst; 16 July 1962 (age 64) St Helens, Lancashire, England

British Touring Car Championship
- Years active: 1988, 1990–1992, 2000
- Teams: Demon Tweeks; Graham Goode Racing; Nissan Janspeed Racing; RJN Motorsport
- Starts: 29
- Wins: 0
- Poles: 0
- Fastest laps: 0
- Best finish: 9th in 1991

Championship titles
- 1990 1995, 1996, 1997, 1998: Production Saloon Car Championship; National Saloon Car Championship

Andrew Michael Middlehurst (born 16 July 1962) is a British racing driver. Middlehurst runs a successful Nissan dealership (Middlehurst Nissan) in the North West of England that is famed for its involvement with the Nissan Skyline GT-R, resulting it being officially imported into the country and more recently the Nissan GT-R R35.

After starting his career on motorcycles in Junior Grass track and Speedway, Middlehurst first raced in cars in 1980 in Formula Ford. After becoming Dunlop Star of Tomorrow Champion in 1982 his early racing included Formula Ford 1600, racing against Ayrton Senna in 1981. Middlehurst went on to rallying in national and international rallies, including the 1984 RAC Rally and Ypres 24 Hours Rally in 1986, in which he took class honours at the wheel of Toyota Corolla GT.

Middlehurst took Class C titles in the BARC Production Saloon Car Championship in both 1988 and 1989 driving a Volkswagen Golf GTI. Middlehurst claimed the overall title in 1990 at the wheel of a Ford Sierra RS Cosworth which led to a drive in the British Touring Car Championship.

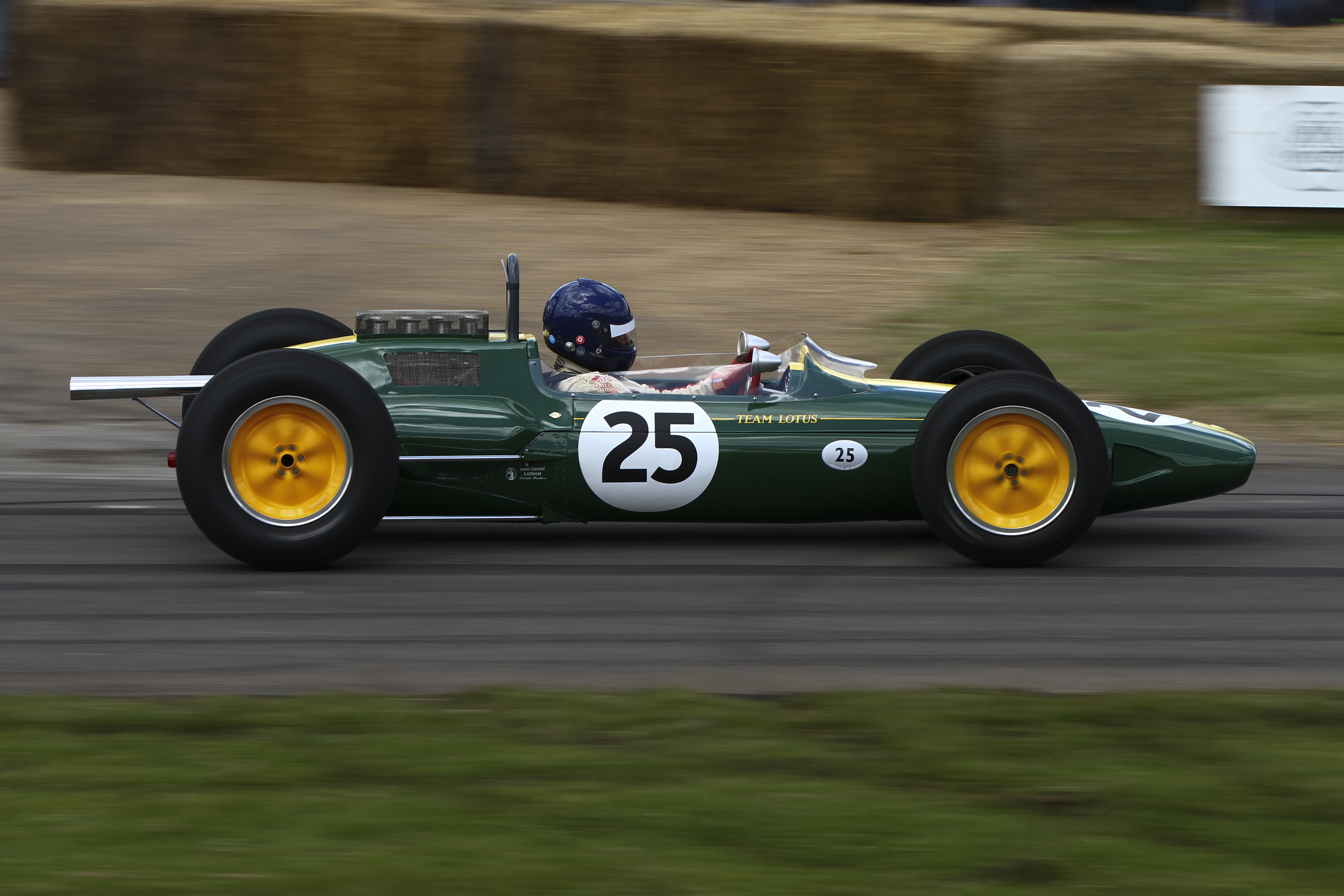
Middlehurst driving a Lotus 25 at the 2012 Goodwood Festival of Speed.

Middlehurst's first full BTCC season came in 1991 for Graham Goode Racing in a Ford Sierra RS Cosworth. An impressive season which included a podium finish in the final round at Silverstone saw Middlehurst end the season ninth overall in the standings. In 1992 he drove for the factory Nissan team alongside Keith O'dor.

In 1993, Middlehurst started competing in the National Saloon Car Championship. He won the championship in 1995 and 1996 at the wheel of a Nissan Skyline GT-R and then again in 1997 and 1998 driving a Nissan Primera. He returned to the BTCC in 2000 for two rounds at Oulton Park driving a Nissan Primera in the newly introduced Class B.

Middlehurst now participates in the Historic Formula One Championship and has numerous race victories, including events at Oulton Park and Monaco. He has won the Glover Trophy at the Goodwood Revival a total of nine times between 2011 and 2024 in Jim Clark's 1963 championship-winning Lotus 25. Middlehurst has won on five occasions at the Monaco Historic Grand Prix in races for pre-1966 Grand Prix cars (2012, 2014, 2016, 2018 and 2024).

== Racing record ==
=== Complete British Touring Car Championship results ===
(key) Races in bold indicate pole position (1 point awarded - 2000 in class) Races in italics indicate fastest lap (1 point awarded - 1988 in class)

Year	Team	Car	Class	1	2	3	4	5	6	7	8	9	10	11	12	13	14	15	16	17	18	19	20	21	22	23	24	Overall Pos	Pts	Class Pos
1988	Demon Tweeks	Volkswagen Golf GTI	C	SIL	OUL	THR	DON	THR	SIL	SIL ovr:15 cls:3	BRH	SNE	BRH	BIR	DON	SIL												47th	3	6th
1990	Listerine Racing Team	Ford Sierra RS500	A	OUL	DON	THR	SIL	OUL	SIL	BRH	SNE	BRH; Ret	BIR	DON	THR	SIL												NC	0	NC
1991	Graham Goode Racing	Ford Sierra RS Cosworth		SIL; 4	SNE; Ret	DON; 13	THR; Ret	SIL; 10^{1}	BRH; Ret	SIL; 16	DON; 1; 7	DON; 2; 7	OUL; 8	BRH; 1; 11	BRH; 2; 4	DON; 8	THR; 7	SIL; 3										9th	41	
1992	Nissan Janspeed Racing	Nissan Primera eGT		SIL; 19	THR; 10	OUL; 17	SNE; 8	BRH; Ret	DON; 1; 9	DON; 2; 6	SIL; 14	KNO; 1; 9	KNO; 2 DNS	PEM; 12	BRH; 1	BRH; 2	DON	SIL										15th	7	
2000	RJN Motorsport	Nissan Primera	B	BRH; 1	BRH; 2	DON; 1	DON; 2	THR; 1	THR; 2	KNO; 1	KNO; 2	OUL; 1	OUL; 2	SIL; 1	SIL; 2	CRO; 1	CRO; 2	SNE; 1	SNE; 2	DON; 1	DON; 2	BRH; 1	BRH; 2	OUL; 1 ovr:14 cls:5	OUL; 2 Ret	SIL; 1	SIL; 2	N/A	6	13th

1. – Race was stopped due to heavy rain. No points were awarded.

=== Complete WRC results ===
Year	Entrant	Car	1	2	3	4	5	6	7	8	9	10	11	12	WDC	Pts
1984	Intercraft Design / System Office Furniture	Ford Escort RS2000	MON	SWE	POR	KEN	FRA	GRE	NZL	ARG	FIN	ITA	CIV	GBR; Ret	NC	0
