= Angus MacKay (racing driver) =

British racing driver (born 1946)

Angus MacKay (born 13 March 1946) is a British former auto racing driver. In 1991, he competed in two rounds of the British Touring Car Championship for R&D Motorsport in a BMW 318is.

== Racing record ==
=== Complete British Touring Car Championship results ===
(key) (Races in bold indicate pole position) (Races in italics indicate fastest lap)

Year	Team	Car	1	2	3	4	5	6	7	8	9	10	11	12	13	14	15	Pos	Pts
1991	R&D Motorsport	BMW 318is	SIL; 15	SNE; 15	DON	THR	SIL	BRH	SIL	DON; 1	DON; 2	OUL	BRH; 1	BRH; 2	DON	THR	SIL	NC	0
