= Graham Goode =

British racing driver (born 1949)

- Nationality: (United Kingdom) British
- Born: 24 February 1949 (age 77) Leicester, Leicestershire, England

British Saloon / Touring Car Championship
- Years active: 1980–1985, 1987–1990
- Teams: Graham Goode Racing
- Starts: 92
- Wins: 0 (9 in class)
- Poles: 0
- Fastest laps: 9
- Best finish: 7th in 1984

Championship titles
- 1985: British Saloon Car Championship - Class B

Graham Derek Goode (born 24 February 1949) is a British former racing driver and car tuning specialist.

Goode worked as an engineer for Broadspeed alongside his contemporary Andy Rouse, before he won the Forward Trust Saloon Car Championship in a self built Ford Anglia in 1974. He founded his own preparation company, Graham Goode Performance Centre in 1976, specialising in Ford vehicles.

== BTCC career ==
After winning several championships in national motorsport, Goode moved up to the British Saloon Car Championship in 1984 driving his own company's Nissan Bluebird. Results came quickly, with several wins scored and a third place in class in his first season. The following season saw another competitive showing. Taking advantage of his relationship with Ford, Goode was one of the first drivers to race the Ford Sierra RS500 in 1987, in fact taking the type's first ever victory. Goode continued his relationship with the RS500 in the following seasons, building his own cars independently to race in the series. He expanded and ran his team with Listerine sponsorship and took on Sean Walker and Mike Newman as drivers alongside himself. While the team's results were solid, Goode could not repeat his earlier good form. Ford were not investing in any one team and without sufficient funds, results were hard to come by.

Following the switch from the class system to the super touring regulations in 1991, Goode ran the car for Andy Middlehurst, and despite having very little money, managed to have a competitive season. Goode left the BTCC and began racing in the far east, winning races in Malaysia.

== Graham Goode Performance Centre ==
Today, Goode continues to run his car preparation business, based in Leicestershire. Employing 25 people, the company offers performance parts, tuning and restoration of Ford, Subaru and Mitsubishi vehicles.

== Racing record ==
=== Complete British Saloon / Touring Car Championship results ===
(key) (Races in bold indicate pole position) (Races in italics indicate fastest lap – 1 point awarded ?–1989 in class)

Year	Team	Car	Class	1	2	3	4	5	6	7	8	9	10	11	12	13	DC	Pts	Class
1980	Kamasa Tools	Ford Capri III 3.0s	D	MAL; 5†	OUL; 4†	THR; Ret	SIL; 5	SIL; Ret	BRH ?	MAL	BRH; Ret	THR; DNS	SIL; 12				27th	8	7th
1981	Bestmoor Silencers	Ford Capri III 3.0s	D	MAL; 7†	SIL	OUL; 10†	THR; 8	BRH	SIL ?	SIL; 9	DON; 9†	BRH	THR	SIL; Ret			41st	1	14th
1982	Graham Goode Racing	Ford Capri III 3.0s	D	SIL	MAL; 6†	OUL	THR	THR; 6	SIL; 7	DON; Ret	BRH	DON; 4	BRH	SIL; Ret			31st	5	9th
1983	Graham Goode Racing	Ford Capri III 3.0s	A	SIL; Ret	OUL	THR	BRH	THR; 5	SIL	DON; Ret	SIL; Ret	DON	BRH	SIL			26th	3	13th
1984	Graham Goode Racing	Nissan Bluebird Turbo	B	DON; 18	SIL; 14	OUL; 12	THR; 13	THR; Ret	SIL; 11	SNE; Ret	BRH; Ret	BRH; 7	DON; 6	SIL; DSQ			7th	40	**3rd**
1985	Graham Goode Racing	Nissan Bluebird Turbo	B	SIL; 4	OUL; 3	THR; Ret	DON; 5	THR; 6	SIL; DSQ	DON; 3	SIL; DSQ	SNE; 6	BRH; 6	BRH	SIL		10th	37‡	**1st**
1987	Listerine Racing Team	Ford Sierra RS Cosworth	A	SIL; 5	OUL; 2	THR; 2	THR; Ret	SIL; 3	SIL; 4	BRH; 15	SNE; 5						9th	34	4th
1987	Listerine Racing Team	Ford Sierra RS500	A									DON; 2	OUL; Ret	DON	SIL		9th	34	4th
1988	Listerine-Texaco Racing	Ford Sierra RS500	A	SIL; Ret	OUL; Ret	THR; 11	DON; Ret	THR; 7	SIL; 7	SIL; 9	BRH; 13	SNE; 5	BRH; 6	BIR; C	DON; 5	SIL; Ret	39th	5	14th
1989	Listerine Racing Team	Ford Sierra RS500	A	OUL; Ret	SIL; 4	THR; DNS	DON; DNQ	THR; 10	SIL; Ret	SIL; 6	BRH; Ret	SNE; 11	BRH; 6	BIR; 9	DON; 6	SIL; Ret	35th	6	12th
1990	Listerine Racing Team	Ford Sierra RS500	A	OUL; Ret	DON; 5	THR; 6	SIL; Ret	OUL; 7	SIL; 5	BRH; Ret	SNE; 5	BRH; 6	BIR; Ret	DON; 4	THR; 4	SIL; 3	11th	72	6th

† Events with 2 races staged for the different classes.

‡ Docked 20 points for technical infringements.
