= Graham Davis (racing driver) =

British former auto racing driver

Grahame Davis is a British former auto racing driver. He has competed in the British Touring Car Championship driving a semi-works Rover 216 GTi built by his own Moto-Build company, which specialised in modifying and maintaining Austin Rover cars, with engines prepared by rallying star Tony Pond. Davis entered four events in 1991, but started only one race. The project was costly, and with no official financial support from Rover Group, the car suffered from a lack of development. Unfortunately, Rover withdrew backing for the project altogether during the season and the team disappeared from the grid, despite tentative plans to compete in the 1992 season.

Davis competed in the 1980 Willhire 24 Hour race, driving an MGB. The car was damaged during the race, but Davis' team fought back to finish 16th. Davis was once European Stock Car Champion. After driving he went into racing management, including the BTCC efforts of GR Asia. Today, he concentrates on his business preparing performance parts for Rover and Lotus vehicles.

== Racing record ==
=== Complete British Touring Car Championship results ===
(key) (Races in bold indicate pole position) (Races in italics indicate fastest lap)

Year	Team	Car	1	2	3	4	5	6	7	8	9	10	11	12	13	14	15	Pos	Pts
1991	Moto-Build	Rover 216GTi	SIL; DNS	SNE; DNS	DON	THR	SIL	BRH	SIL; DNS	DON; 1	DON; 2	OUL	BRH; 1 Ret	BRH; 1 DNS	DON	THR	SIL	NC	0
