= Alistair Fenwick =

British racing driver (born 1951)

Alistair Fenwick (born 15 November 1951) is a retired British auto racing driver. His most famous drive was in the 1990 24 Hours of Le Mans. He drove for the GP Motorsport Team, alongside Alex Postan and New Zealand driver Craig Simmiss. In the last placed car to complete the race, he finished fifth in the C2 Class, twenty-eighth overall. In 1991, he entered round twelve of the British Touring Car Championship, but failed to start the race.

== Racing record ==
=== Complete British Touring Car Championship results ===
(key) (Races in bold indicate pole position) (Races in italics indicate fastest lap)

Year	Team	Car	1	2	3	4	5	6	7	8	9	10	11	12	13	14	15	Pos	Pts
1991	Pyramid Motorsport	BMW M3	SIL	SNE	DON	THR	SIL	BRH	SIL	DON; 1	DON; 2	OUL	BRH; 1	BRH; 1	DON	THR; DNS	SIL	NC	0
