= Godfrey Hall (racing driver) =

British racing driver (born 1949)

- Nationality: (United Kingdom) British
- Born: 25 May 1949 (age 77) Birmingham, West Midlands, England

British Touring Car Championship
- Years active: 1988–1991
- Teams: John Maguire Racing; Pyramid Motorsport
- Starts: 33
- Wins: 0
- Poles: 0
- Fastest laps: 0
- Best finish: 4th in 1988

Godfrey Hall (born 25 May 1949) is a British auto racing driver.

== Career ==
In 1983, Hall won the Monoposto Championship in what was his fourth year in the series. He progressed into the British Formula Three Championship the following year, where he spent two seasons. After spending 1987 in the British Production Saloon Championship, he competed in the British Touring Car Championship in 1988. In his debut season, he finished fourth in the championship and second in class B with his BMW M3. He spent two more seasons competing in the BTCC. In 1991, he entered just one round of the BTCC's new Super Touring era at Silverstone. Since he exited the BTCC, he has competed in historic racing.

== Racing record ==
=== Complete British Touring Car Championship results ===
(key) (Races in bold indicate pole position – 1988–1990 in class) (Races in italics indicate fastest lap – 1 point awarded ?–1989 in class)

Year	Team	Car	Class	1	2	3	4	5	6	7	8	9	10	11	12	13	14	15	DC	Pts	Class
1988	John Maguire Racing	BMW M3	B	SIL ovr:6 cls:3	OUL ovr:8 cls:3	THR ovr:7 cls:3	DON ovr:9 cls:2	THR ovr:9 cls:2	SIL ovr:13 cls:3	SIL ovr:11 cls:2	BRH; Ret	SNE ovr:13 cls:3	BRH ovr:9 cls:2	BIR; C	DON ovr:15 cls:4	SIL; Ret			4th	48	**2nd**
1989	John Maguire Racing	BMW M3	B	OUL ovr:12 cls:3	SIL ovr:15 cls:2	THR ovr:9 cls:3	DON; Ret	THR ovr:12 cls:2	SIL ovr:17 cls:4	SIL; Ret	BRH; DNS	SNE	BRH	BIR ovr:15 cls:5	DON	SIL ovr:13 cls:3			13th	31	5th
1990	Pyramid Motorsport	BMW M3	B	OUL; DNS	DON ovr:7 cls:2	THR ovr:12 cls:5	SIL ovr:10 cls:5	OUL ovr:12 cls:4	SIL ovr:11 cls:4	BRH ovr:6 cls:3	SNE ovr:15 cls:10	BRH ovr:12 cls:6	BIR ovr:9 cls:4	DON ovr:11 cls:5	THR ovr:12 cls:7	SIL			8th	92	4th
1991	Pyramid Motorsport	BMW M3		SIL	SNE	DON	THR	SIL	BRH	SIL	DON; 1	DON; 2	OUL	BRH; 1	BRH; 2	DON	THR	SIL; 20	37th	0	
