= Prodrive =

British motorsport corporation

- Type: Private
- Industry: Motorsport; Advanced Technology
- Founded: 1984
- Headquarters: Banbury, England
- Key people: David Richards (founder and chairman); Mark Roeloffzen (CEO)
- Website: Prodrive.com

Prodrive is an English motorsport and advanced engineering group based in Banbury, Oxfordshire. The company has had significant success running motorsport programmes for various automobile manufacturers, including wins at the 24 Hours of Le Mans and championship wins in the World Endurance Championship, World Rally Championship and British Touring Car Championship.

== History ==
Prodrive was founded in 1984 by Ian Parry and David Richards. The company initially ran Porsche 911 rally and Porsche 959 rally raid cars.

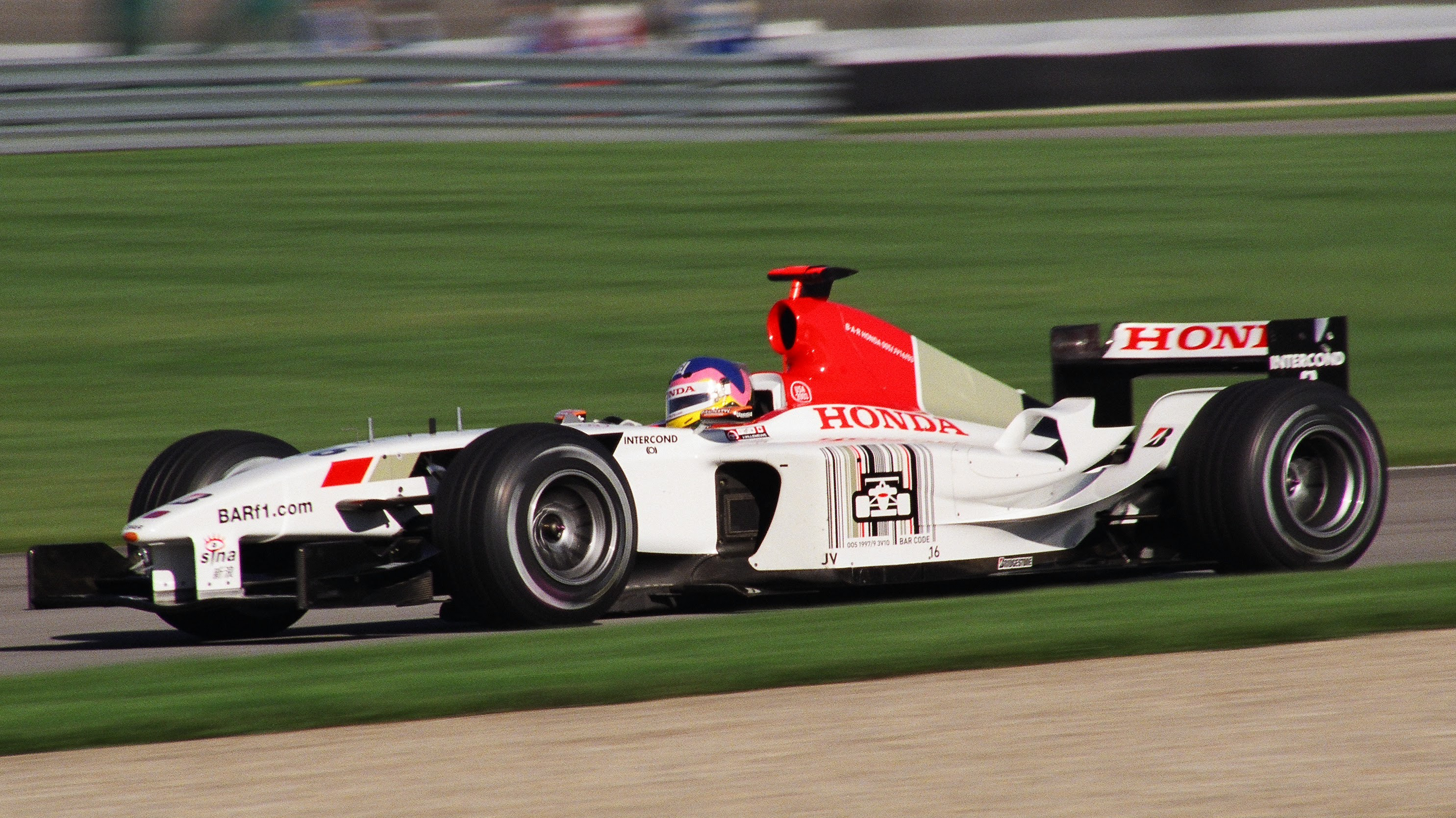
Jacques Villeneuve driving for the Prodrive-run BAR team in 2003

=== Formula One ===
Prodrive ran the British American Racing team between 2002 and 2004, finishing 2nd overall in the constructors championship in 2004.

On 28 April 2006, Prodrive were officially granted entry to F1 when the FIA announced the list of entrants to the 2008 Formula One World Championship. It was announced on 23 November 2007 that Prodrive F1 would not compete in the 2008, as the legal situation left no time for the team to be set up for the start of the season.

On 23 April 2009, Prodrive issued a press release stating that they were considering an F1 entry for the 2010 season, possibly under the Aston Martin Racing brand. On 29 May 2009, it was reported that Prodrive had submitted a formal application for the 2010 season. However, Prodrive was not accepted to the final grid. Prodrive was one of two potential buyers considered by the Renault F1 Team to take-over the team prior to the 2010 season. In April 2010 Prodrive announced it would not apply for the 2011 Formula One season. The slot became available after US F1 Team collapsed.

=== Sportscars ===
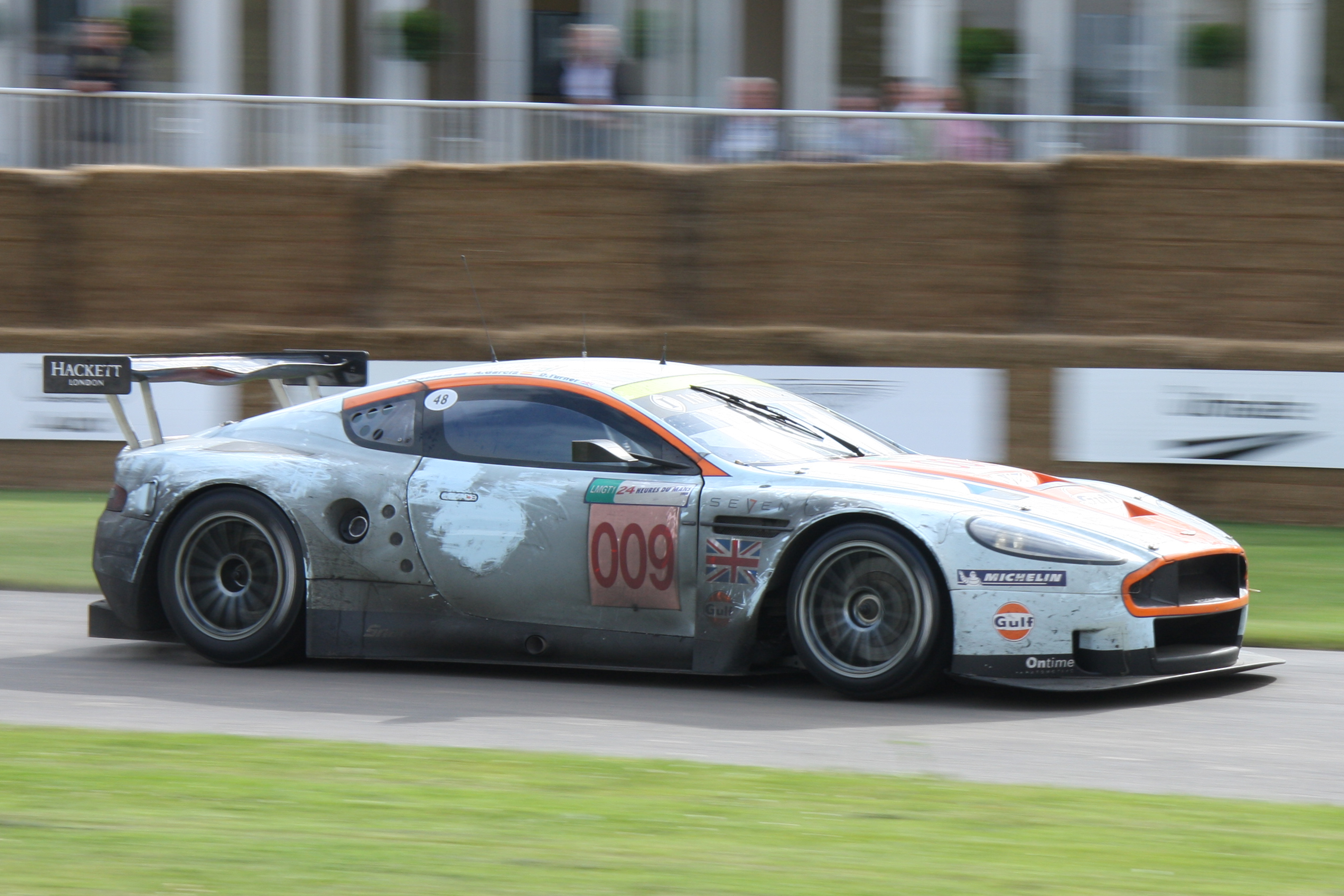
Aston Martin DBR9, which won the GT1 class at the 2008 24 Hours of Le Mans

In 2001, Prodrive developed and built the Ferrari 550 GTS to compete in the GT1 category, without any support from the Ferrari factory. Ten cars were built over 4 years, run by both Prodrive and private customers. A Prodrive-run car won the GTS class at the 2003 24 Hours of Le Mans, with a BMS Scuderia Italia-run car won the FIA GT Championship in both 2003 and 2004.

In 2004, Aston Martin Racing was established as partnership between Prodrive and Aston Martin, to return the brand to sports car racing. The team enjoyed continued success at the 24 Hours of Le Mans, with the Aston Martin DBR9 finishing 1st in class in 2007 and 2008, the Aston Martin Vantage GTE finishing 1st in class in 2014 and 2017, and the Aston Martin Vantage GTE finishing 1st in class in 2020. Despite Aston Martin Racing ending its race programme in 2020, Prodrive continues to build and maintain a variety of Aston Martin cars available to customer teams – over 500 have been built.

=== Rallying ===
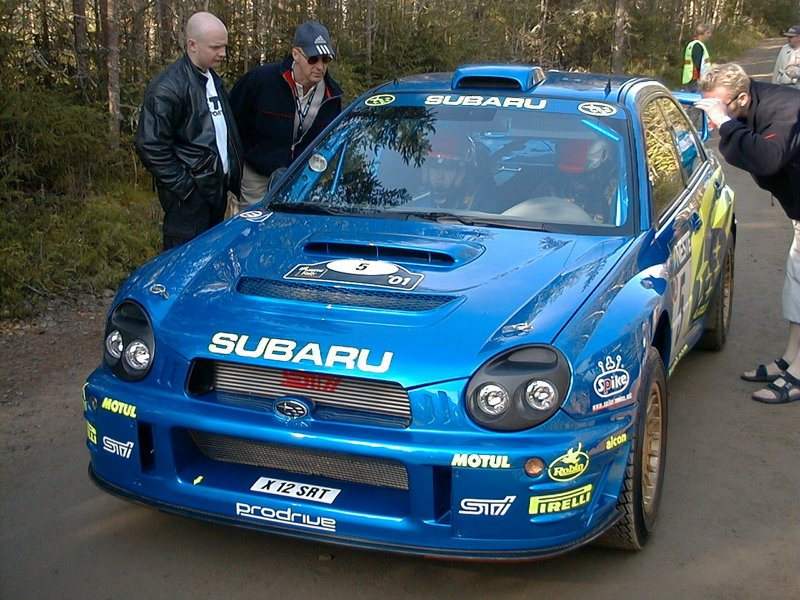
Subaru Impreza WRC in 2001

Prodrive ran the Subaru World Rally Team between 1989 and 2008, competing at the top of the World Rally Championship for over a decade. Subaru won the manufacturers' championship three times in 1995, 1996, and 1997, and the drivers' championship three times, in 1995, 2001, and 2003. Its Impreza WRC model won a record 46 rallies. Subaru withdrew from WRC competition at the end of the 2008 season due to the 2008 financial crisis.

In 2010, Mini announced plans to enter the World Rally Championship, with a Countryman WRC designed, built and ran by Prodrive. The team competed in a reduced programme during the 2011 season, before BMW cut funding and withdrawing at the end of 2012.

=== Touring cars ===
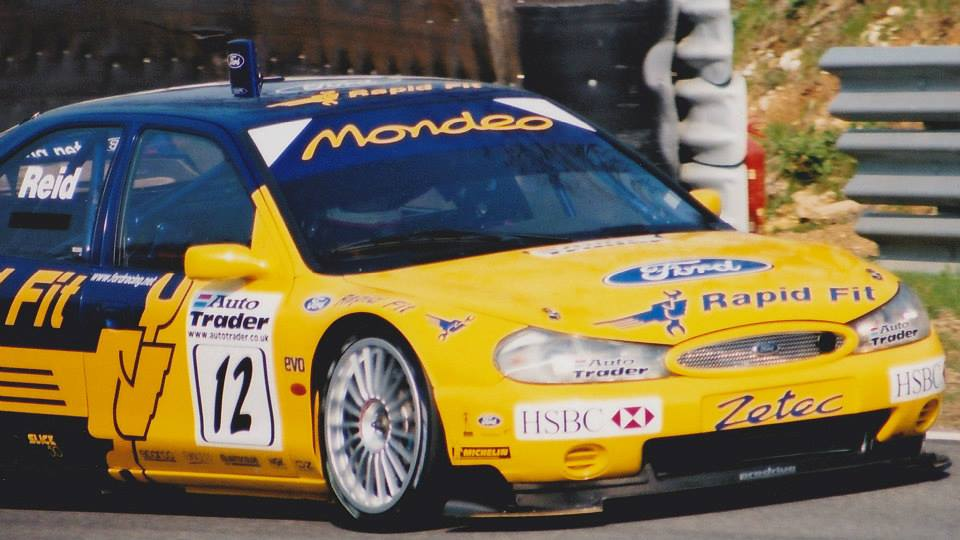
Ford Mondeo Super Touring during the 2000 BTCC season

Prodrive developed and ran touring cars for several different manufacturers, including for BMW, Alfa Romeo, Honda and Ford in the British Touring Car Championship (BTCC) in the 1990s and early 2000s. Prodrive won the 1988, 1991 and 1992 BTCC seasons with BMW and the 2000 BTCC season with Ford.

Prodrive also ran Ford's in the V8 Supercars category in Australia, having purchased Glenn Seton Racing in 2002. The team was sold in 2013.

=== Rally Raid ===
Between 2020 and 2023, Prodrive developed the Prodrive BRX Hunter rally raid car, running the car using the Bahrain Raid Xtreme team – a joint venture with Bahrain's sovereign wealth fund Mumtalakat Holding Company. The team's best result at the Dakar Rally was 2nd overall in both 2022 and 2023.

== Facilities ==
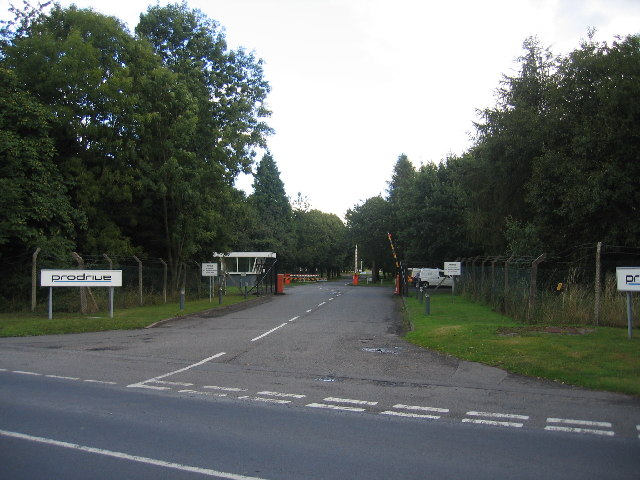
Proving ground in Warwickshire

Prodrive had a facility at the former RAF Honiley airfield and LucasVarity proving ground near Wroxall, Warwickshire, together with Marcos and TRW.

In March 2006, Prodrive announced its intent to build a £200million, 200-acre (0.8 km^{2}) motorsport facility called "The Fulcrum".

As of 3 August 2006, Prodrive has won the support of the Warwick District Council planning committee for development of The Fulcrum. The permission covers a highly advanced engineering research and development campus, a conference facility called the Catalyst Centre and new access road, a roundabout, infrastructure, parking and landscaping. The plans still have to be presented and agreed by the British government's Department for Communities and Local Government. There is local opposition against Prodrive's plans via the Fulcrum Prodrive Action Group (FPAG) to protect the rural nature of the community and the safety of the people that live within it.

In 2014 the site was sold to Jaguar Land Rover.

== Racing record ==
=== Complete Formula One results ===
(key)

Year	Team	Chassis	Engine	Tyres	Drivers	1	2	3	4	5	6	7	8	9	10	11	12	13	14	15	16	17	18	19	Points	WCC
2002	(United Kingdom) British American Racing	004	Honda RA002E 3.0 V10	B		AUS	MAL	BRA	SMR	ESP	AUT	MON	CAN	EUR	GBR	FRA	GER	HUN	BEL	ITA	USA	JPN			7	8th
2002	(United Kingdom) British American Racing	004	Honda RA002E 3.0 V10	B	(Canada) Jacques Villeneuve	Ret	8	10^{†}	7	7	10^{†}	Ret	Ret	12	4	Ret	Ret	Ret	8	9	6	Ret			7	8th
2002	(United Kingdom) British American Racing	004	Honda RA002E 3.0 V10	B	(France) Olivier Panis	Ret	Ret	Ret	Ret	Ret	Ret	Ret	8	9	5	Ret	Ret	12	12^{†}	6	12	Ret			7	8th
2003	(United Kingdom) British American Racing	005	Honda RA003E 3.0 V10	B		AUS	MAL	BRA	SMR	ESP	AUT	MON	CAN	EUR	FRA	GBR	GER	HUN	ITA	USA	JPN				26	5th
2003	(United Kingdom) British American Racing	005	Honda RA003E 3.0 V10	B	(Canada) Jacques Villeneuve	9	DNS	6	Ret	Ret	12	Ret	Ret	Ret	9	10	9	Ret	6	Ret					26	5th
2003	(United Kingdom) British American Racing	005	Honda RA003E 3.0 V10	B	(Japan) Takuma Sato																6				26	5th
2003	(United Kingdom) British American Racing	005	Honda RA003E 3.0 V10	B	(United Kingdom) Jenson Button	10	7	Ret	8	9	4	DNS	Ret	7	Ret	8	8	10	Ret	Ret	4				26	5th
2004	(United Kingdom) British American Racing	006	Honda RA004E 3.0 V10	M		AUS	MAL	BHR	SMR	ESP	MON	EUR	CAN	USA	FRA	GBR	GER	HUN	BEL	ITA	CHN	JPN	BRA		119	2nd
2004	(United Kingdom) British American Racing	006	Honda RA004E 3.0 V10	M	(United Kingdom) Jenson Button	6	3	3	2^{P}	8	2	3	3	Ret	5	4	2	5	Ret	3	2	3	Ret		119	2nd
2004	(United Kingdom) British American Racing	006	Honda RA004E 3.0 V10	M	(Japan) Takuma Sato	9	15^{†}	5	16^{†}	5	Ret	Ret	Ret	3	Ret	11	8	6	Ret	4	6	4	6		119	2nd

=== 24 Hours of Le Mans results ===
Year	Entrant	No.	Car	Drivers	Class	Laps	Pos.	Class Pos.
2002	(United Kingdom) Prodrive	58	Ferrari 550-GTS Maranello	(Czech Republic) Tomáš Enge (Switzerland) Alain Menu (Sweden) Rickard Rydell	LMGTS	174	DNF	DNF
2003	(United Kingdom) Veloqx Prodrive Racing	80	Ferrari 550-GTS Maranello	(United Kingdom) Kelvin Burt (United Kingdom) Anthony Davidson (United Kingdom) Darren Turner	LMGTS	176	DNF	DNF
2003	(United Kingdom) Veloqx Prodrive Racing	88	Ferrari 550-GTS Maranello	(United Kingdom) Jamie Davies (Czech Republic) Tomáš Enge (Netherlands) Peter Kox	LMGTS	336	10th	1st
2004	(United Kingdom) Prodrive Racing	65	Ferrari 550-GTS Maranello	(United Kingdom) Colin McRae (Sweden) Rickard Rydell (United Kingdom) Darren Turner	LMGTS	329	9th	3rd
2004	(United Kingdom) Prodrive Racing	66	Ferrari 550-GTS Maranello	(Czech Republic) Tomáš Enge (Switzerland) Alain Menu (Netherlands) Peter Kox	LMGTS	325	11th	4th
2005 – present: see Aston Martin Racing.

== See also ==
- Aston Martin Racing
- Prodrive P2
- Tickford Racing – Formerly known as Ford Performance Racing and Prodrive Racing Australia
