= Vauxhall Belmont =

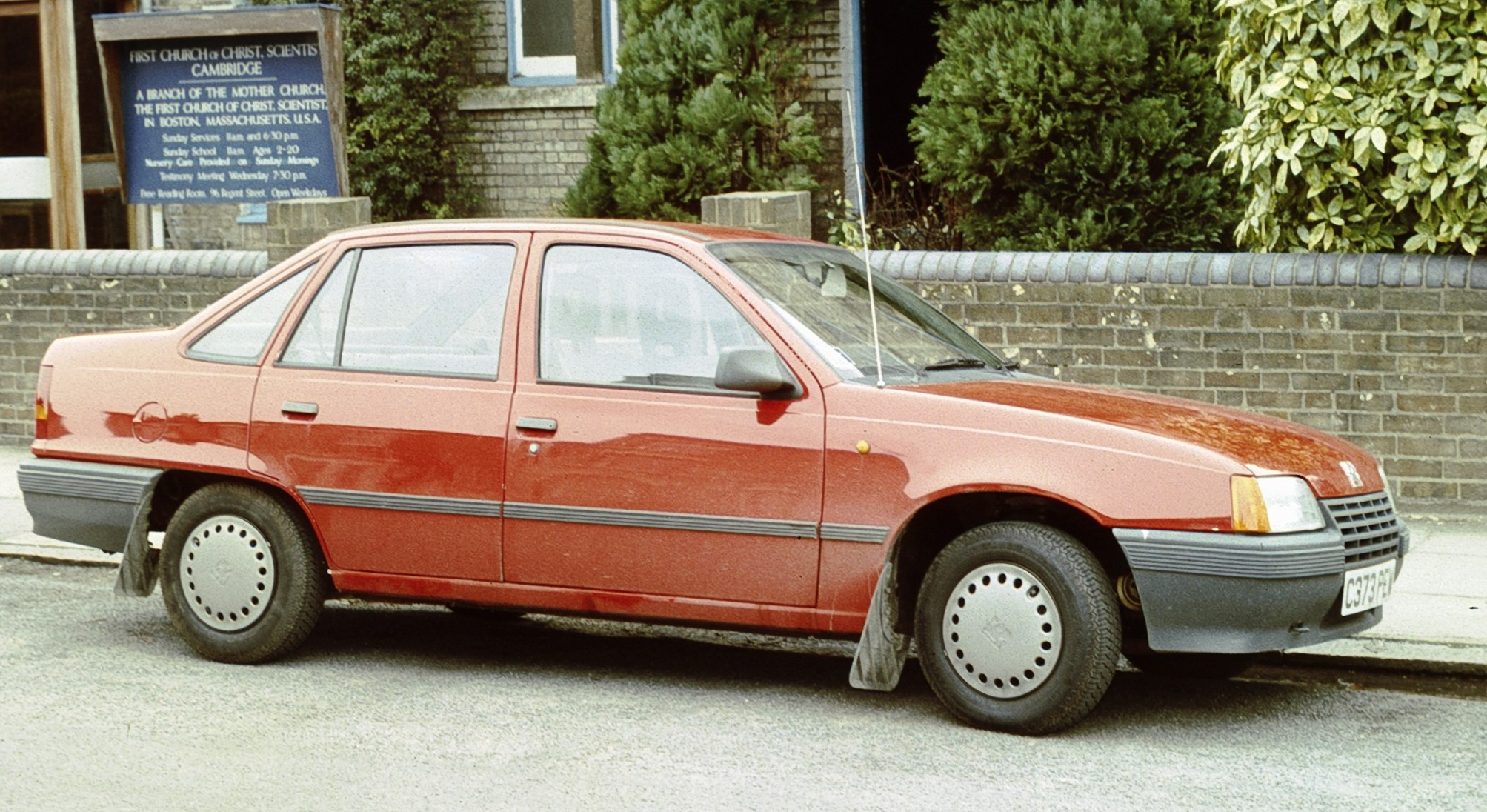

Overview
- Manufacturer: Vauxhall (General Motors)
- Production: January 1986 – September 1991

Body and chassis
- Class: Small family car
- Body style: 4-door saloon
- Related: Vauxhall Astra; Opel Kadett E Daewoo Nexia

Chronology
- Predecessor: Vauxhall Astra (saloon) (1980–1984)
- Successor: Vauxhall Astra (saloon) (1991)

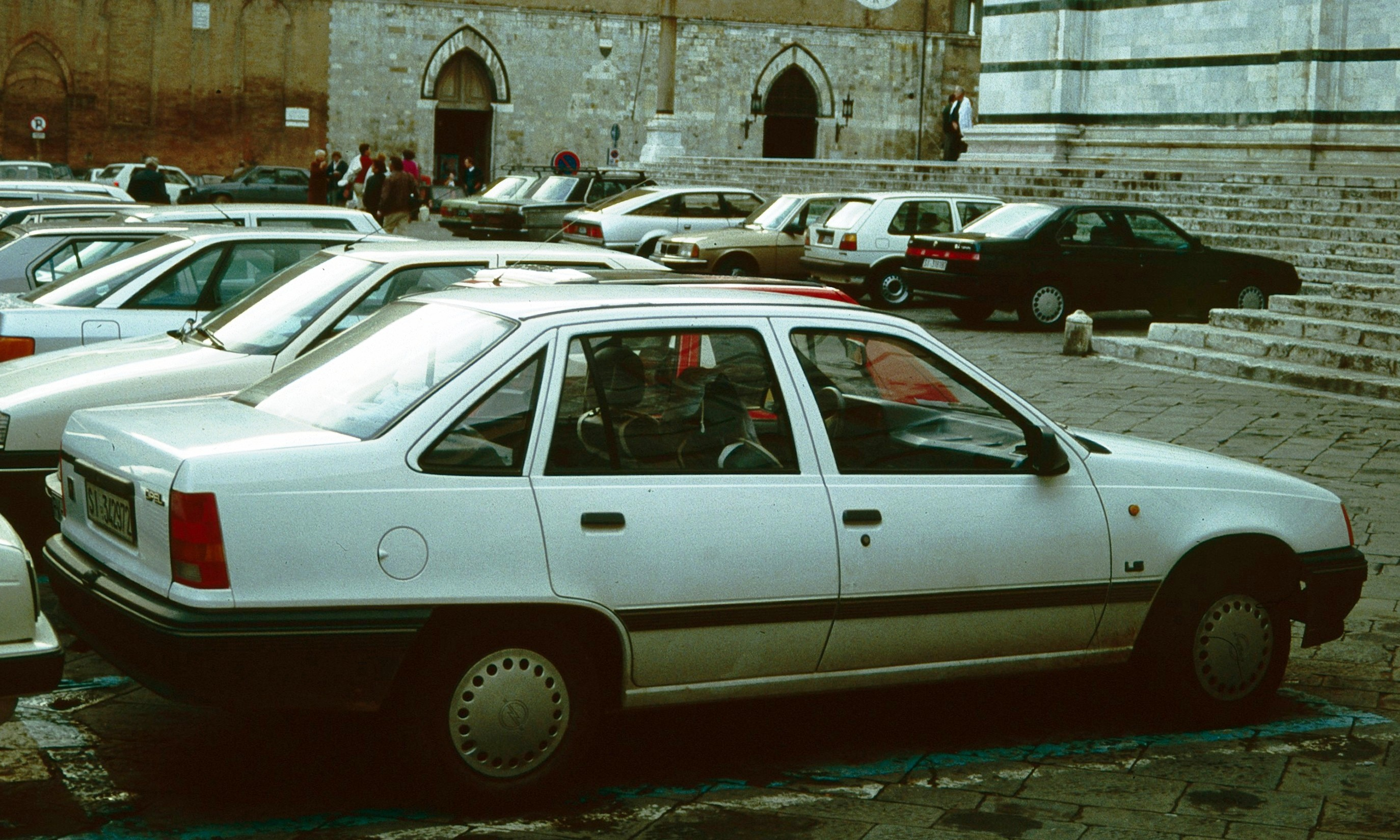
The saloon of the Opel Kadett (1984–1991) shared its body with the Belmont

The Vauxhall Belmont is a saloon car sold in Great Britain by Vauxhall between January 1986 and September 1991. It is a rebadged version of the Opel Kadett E saloon, with this bodystyle launched in September 1985. The other body styles of the Kadett E were marketed in the United Kingdom as Vauxhall Astra. The Belmont won praise for its huge boot compared to other rivals of the time.

With hatchbacks becoming firmly established as the preferred bodystyle in small European family cars, fewer saloons were on offer. During the 1980s, in order to enable them to position saloons as a slight cut above their hatchback counterparts, many manufacturers marketed them with different nameplates.

Ford of Europe's saloon version of the Ford Escort hatchback was badged the Ford Orion, and the Volkswagen Golf based saloon was sold as the Volkswagen Jetta.

However, when GM launched a saloon version of the Vauxhall Astra/Opel Kadett, only British customers received it with a different badge. The Belmont went on sale in January 1986. While sold as a Kadett in the rest of Europe, in South Africa, it was called the Opel Monza (not to be confused with the large Senator based coupé sold in Europe) along with a convertible. This replaced the Opel Ascona.

When the Astra II was replaced in September 1991, the Belmont nameplate was shelved, the car never having never lived up to Vauxhall's claim that it was "not just a booted Astra".

In December 2004, it was revealed that the Belmont was the most stolen car in the United Kingdom in terms of ratio stolen, with 1,978 vehicles stolen in 2003, which amounted to around 1 out of every 10 Belmonts registered. At this time, an estimated 20,000 Belmonts remained on the road. The car also topped a similar list for 2005, this list being published in December 2006.

As of 2019, according to records by the DVLA, only twenty three Belmonts remain on the roads, with a further sixty nine on SORN. This has made it a very rare car on British roads.

== End of the Belmont ==
Vauxhall deleted the Belmont nametag with the launch of the Mark 3 Astra in September 1991, and the Astra nameplate was used on all body styles. For later variant of the Astra, see the Opel Astra. Sales of the Astra badged saloon were not as strong as those achieved by the Belmont, as saloons of this size continued to fall in popularity throughout the 1990s.

Later Astra saloons were also sold as an Opel, unlike the Belmont, which in the United Kingdom was only sold as a Vauxhall. The saloon version was dropped altogether in March 2004, upon the launch of the MK V Astra, although right hand drive saloons with Opel badges have continued to be sold in Ireland.

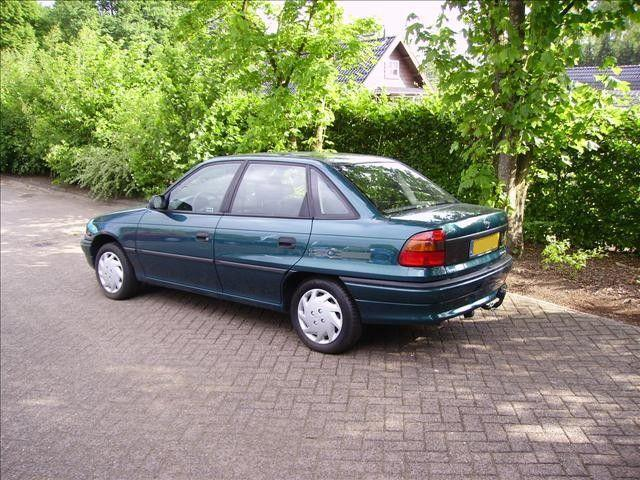
Opel Astra (saloon) (1991–1998)

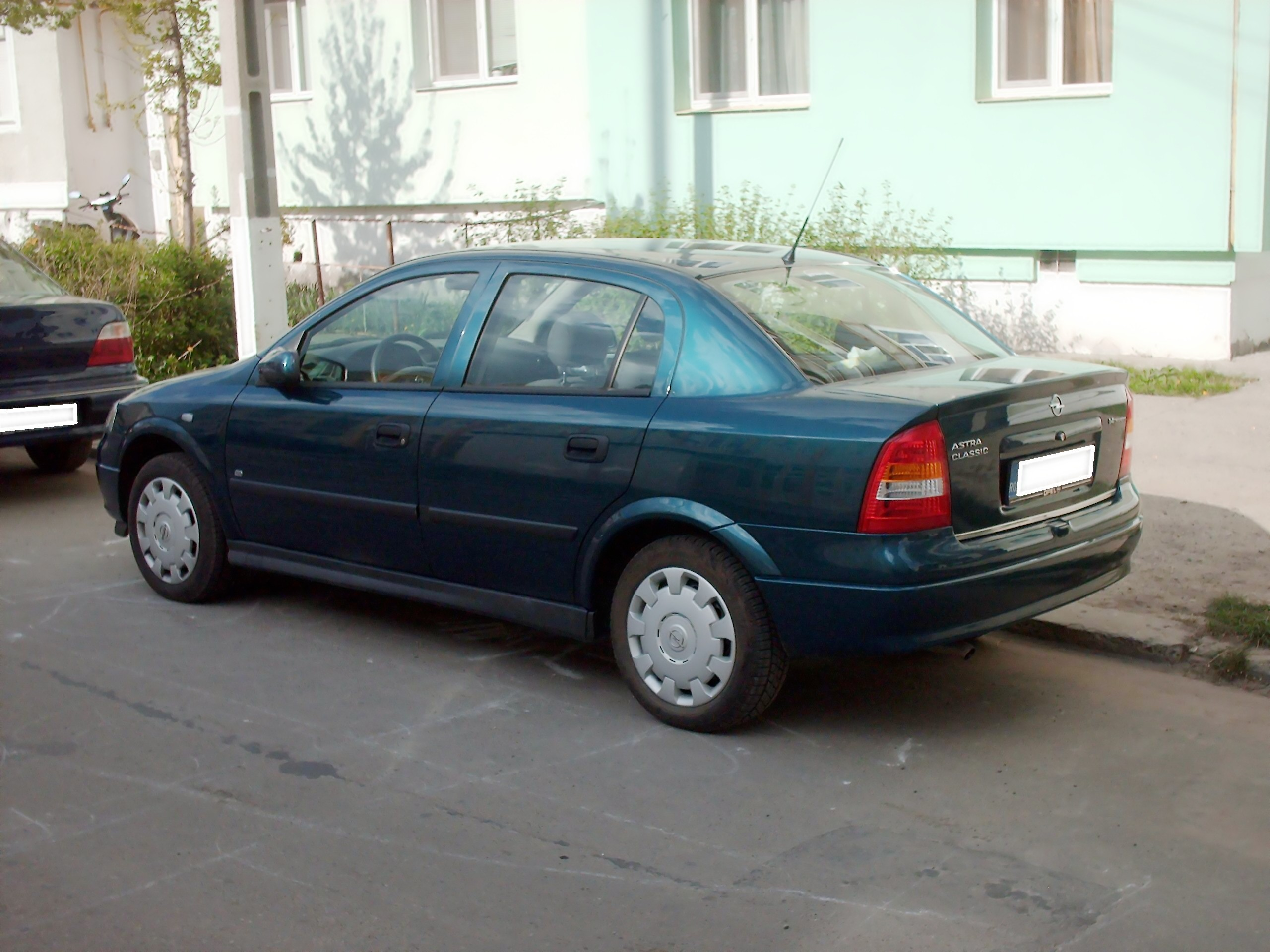
Opel Astra (saloon) (1998–2004)
