= Birmingham Superprix =

Motor racing event in Birmingham, England

- Superprix Circuit (1986–1990)
- Location: Birmingham, England
- Coordinates: 52°28′13.31″N 1°53′59.3″W
- Opened: 25 August 1986; 40 years ago
- Closed: 27 August 1990; 36 years ago
- Major events: International Formula 3000 (1986–1990); British Touring Car Championship (1988–1990); Thundersports Series (1986)

Superprix Circuit (1986–1990)
- Length: 2.469 mi (3.974 km)
- Turns: 7
- Race lap record: 1:22.910 ( (Brazil) Roberto Moreno, Ralt RT21, 1987, F3000)

Birmingham Superprix was a motor racing meeting held on a street circuit in Birmingham city centre, England, from 1986 to 1990. The principal event was a round of the FIA Formula 3000 Championship, but support races included BTCC and Thundersports Series rounds, as well as sports car racing.

== History ==
=== Early days ===
The idea of a motor race in the centre of Birmingham – England's second city – was mooted in local council meetings as far back as 1966. A councillor from Birmingham City Council, Peter Barwell, and Birmingham businessman and racing driver Martin Hone were the proposers of the idea, and pushed it forward against various oppositions. Stirling Moss obtained permission from the council to hold a race in 1972, but the event never materialised. There was, however, a demo run by Patrick Nève in his Brabham BT45 around the Bull Ring in 1976.

In November 1984 the council forwarded the Birmingham Road Race Bill to Parliament. Members of Parliament approved the bill in April 1985 and it received royal assent in October 1985. This allowed preparations for the Birmingham SuperPrix to begin. The event was to be centered on a race for Formula 3000 cars. The circuit was laid out on closed streets near the city centre, and the meeting was scheduled for two days during the August Bank Holiday.

=== 1986 ===
The first SuperPrix was held on 25 and 26 August 1986. The circuit was drenched by torrential downpours from the tail end of Hurricane Charley. Being laid out on public roads, the circuit was bumpy and the cars were thrown around badly. Pierluigi Martini and Luis Pérez-Sala qualified on the front row, followed by Andrew Gilbert-Scott. The championship leader Ivan Capelli spun early on, in his March 86B powered car. Because of long delays, the first race was run over a reduced distance. The race was red-flagged when Gilbert-Scott was experiencing handling problems after an earlier spin. When he exited the Bristol Street Motors Bend on the 21st lap, he lost it and crashed into Alain Ferté's stationary car, blocking part of the track, with Pérez-Sala still fighting for the win from a fast catching up Martini. Pérez-Sala was given the win, Martini given second, and Michel Ferté took third. The top six drivers were awarded half points as the race was red-flagged on the 24th lap, just before the halfway point of the 51 lap race.

=== 1987 ===
The 1987 race, held on 30 and 31 August, was a complete contrast to the 1986 race and the weather was sunny. Maurício Gugelmin was on pole, alongside Stefano Modena. Later on, Pierluigi Martini was forced to pit with electrical problems, while Roberto Moreno had a tremendous race, having started from the pits after stalling before the warm-up lap. Modena made it his second win of the season, while Moreno took second after his pressure had caused Andy Wallace to make a driving error at the Ferodo Corner. After his pole, Gugelmin took third place.

=== 1988 ===
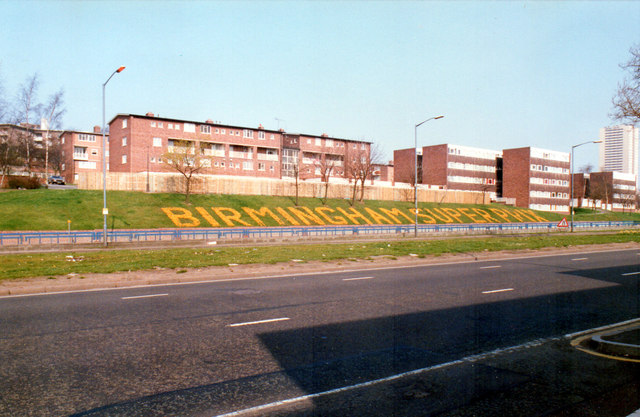
Flowers along the track forming 'Birmingham Superprix'

The 1988 race, held on 28 and 29 August, was also sunny, but had two restarts. The first one was because of a huge accident involving David Hunt. Hunt's vehicle was involved in a massive shunt, clipping Claudio Langes's car as the cars in front of them slowed down due to a Bertrand Gachot/Andy Wallace accident at the Zenith Turn (Hunt's car managed to punch a massive hole into a wholesalers' shop wall at the fast Loctite Corner). The second stoppage was due to an incident involving Russell Spence. After his car spun and blocked the road, a crane came to move his car. Spence was still in the car, and frantically waving at the crane driver to put his car down facing the right way. The car was lowered, but not in the right place and Spence got out of his car, and then the leaders got caught up in the incident. Roberto Moreno took the chequered flag after the 2nd restart, with Martin Donnelly and Martini in second and third respectively.

As a result of the delayed F3000 race, the British Touring Car Championship (BTCC) and other support races were cancelled due to the time limit imposed by the Road Race Bill.

=== 1989 ===
The F3000 race at the Birmingham Superprix, held on 27 and 28 August, was just as sunny as the two previous ones, there was a carnival atmosphere. During the qualifying session, Martin Donnelly abandoned his car after a spin at the Holts Corner, and watched on as his car was t-boned by Éric Chéli. Donnelly's Eddie Jordan Racing team worked to get the Reynard car repaired, and he was able to start the race with an incomplete livery. His team mate Jean Alesi fought throughout the race with Marco Apicella. It stayed that way at the end, with Alesi beating Apicella by a slender margin. Donnelly came back to finish third.

=== 1990 ===
The Birmingham Superprix course as it appeared for the final event in August 1990, showing the large variation in track width around the street circuit

The 1990 race, held on 26 and 27 August, was the last staging of the event. The F3000 race was won by Eric van de Poele, with polesitter Apicella retiring from the race. Only 11 of the 30 entrants finished the race. The BTCC race was won by Andy Rouse, whilst Kurt Luby won Class B. As in the F3000 race, the polesitter retired – in this case it was Robb Gravett, who experienced an engine failure after 10 laps.

== Circuit ==
The Birmingham SuperPrix circuit was laid down on public roads, just to the south of Birmingham City Centre. Slightly unusually the circuit ran anticlockwise. The start-finish straight was in the southbound lane of Bristol Street, the A38 road. The pit area was located on the forecourt of the Bristol Street Motors Ford dealership, with garaging for teams and cars housed in a multi-storey car park adjacent.

From this area the circuit headed south to cross the southern portion of Birmingham's ring road, the A4540 road, before it turned left and then headed east on a minor collector road. After approximately 180 m (200 yd), cars took the southern part of the Belgrave Interchange roundabout as a right-left-right chicane, before following the slip road to drop down on to the south side (normally westbound lane) of the A4540 Belgrave Middleway dual carriageway. This continued as an undulating and slightly curved straight for around 650 m (710 yd) until the cars arrived at the Haden Circus roundabout, named Halfords Corner after the title sponsor. Here, a large proportion of the centre of the roundabout island had been flattened and surfaced with tarmac forming a broad pan, reducing the radius of the hairpin corner significantly, but the slightly dished profile of the roundabout itself remained resulting in a significant hump as cars entered the corner's braking zone.

Following the hairpin, cars raced back along the opposite, northern side of Belgrave Middleway and took a sharp left-right kink up the opposing slip road that returned them to the interchange roundabout. Here, the roundabout entry and exit formed a double-apex right hand corner on to the much narrower Sherlock Street straight, an ordinary urban street that took competitors back toward the city centre. This continued for a little over half a kilometre to an open, fast, left hand bend on to Pershore Street. This short, 190 m (210 yd) straight led to a tight, 90-degree left hand corner on to Bromsgrove Street. This corner was the scene of the infamous jam during the 1988 F3000 race when three cars collided at the corner and could not be cleared before the leaders reappeared behind them, causing the race to be stopped.

Bromsgrove Street straight then headed southwest for approximately 370 m (400 yd) to a slight right hand kink into a narrow bridge across a pedestrian underpass, which then emerged through a tight left turn immediately back on to the broad expanse of the Bristol Street start-finish straight.

== Results ==
Year	Winner	Runner-up	Third place	Pole position	Fastest lap
1986	(Spain) Luis Pérez-Sala	(Italy) Pierluigi Martini	(France) Michel Ferté	(Italy) Pierluigi Martini	(Chile) Eliseo Salazar
1987	(Italy) Stefano Modena	(Brazil) Roberto Moreno	(Brazil) Maurício Gugelmin	(Brazil) Maurício Gugelmin	(Brazil) Roberto Moreno
1988	(Brazil) Roberto Moreno	(United Kingdom) Martin Donnelly	(Italy) Pierluigi Martini	(France) Olivier Grouillard	(United Kingdom) Martin Donnelly
1989	(France) Jean Alesi	(Italy) Marco Apicella	(United Kingdom) Martin Donnelly	(France) Jean Alesi	(France) Jean Alesi
1990	(Belgium) Eric van de Poele	(Switzerland) Andrea Chiesa	(France) Didier Artzet	(Italy) Marco Apicella	(Italy) Marco Apicella

== Lap records ==
The fastest official race lap records at the Birmingham Superprix Circuit are listed as:

Category	Time	Driver	Vehicle	Event
Superprix Circuit (1986–1990): 2.469 mi (3.974 km)
F3000	1:22.910	Roberto Moreno	Ralt RT21	1987 Birmingham Superprix
Group A	1:35.700	Robb Gravett	Ford Sierra RS500 Cosworth	1990 Birmingham BTCC round

== See also ==
- Sport in Birmingham
