= 2007 Britcar 24 Hour =

Automobile endurance race in the UK

Seasons
- ← 2006 2008 →

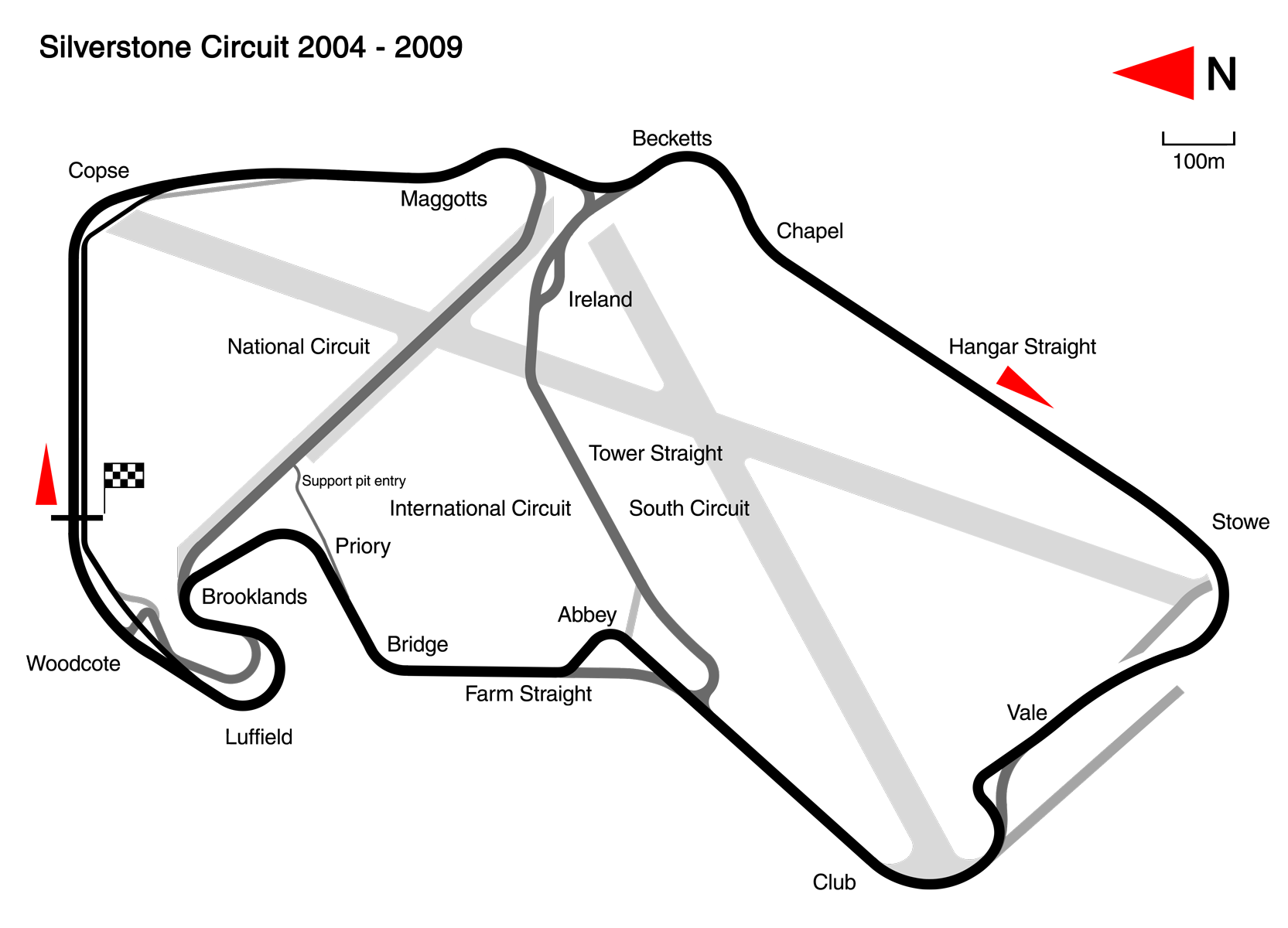
The map of Silverstone Circuit Grand Prix layout

The 2007 Britcar 24 Hour or 2007 24 Hours of Silverstone was an automobile endurance race, organised by Britcar, held from 8 to 9 September 2007 at Silverstone Circuit. It was the 3rd edition of the Britcar 24 Hour event. The race was won by Duller Motorsport, running a BMW Z4, driven by Dieter Quester, Dirk Werner, Tim Mullen and Jamie Campbell-Walter.

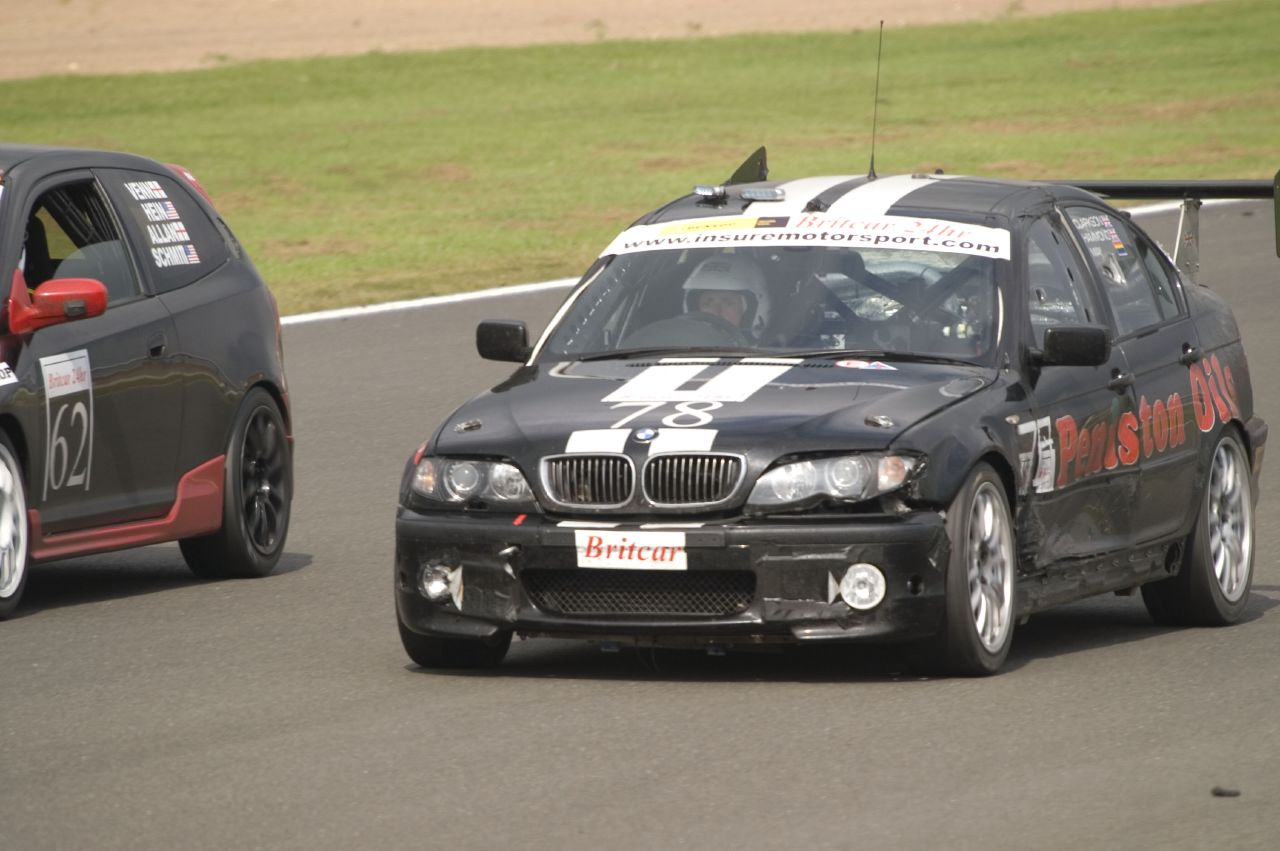
The BMW 330d of Richard Hammond.

The race is also well known for having been featured on Top Gear, Season 10, Episode 9, in which Jeremy Clarkson, Richard Hammond and James May along with The Stig (Ben Collins) participated. Future Top Gear presenter Chris Harris participated in the event as well.

== Entry list ==
60 Cars were entered into the event.

Team	Car	Engine	No.	Drivers
GT3 (11 entries)
(Austria) Duller Motorsport	BMW Z4 M Coupé	BMW 3.2 L I6	1	(United Kingdom) Jamie Campbell-Walter (Austria) Dieter Quester (Austria) Johannes Stuck (Germany) Dirk Werner
(United Kingdom) Rollcentre Racing with Deutsche Bank	Mosler MT900R GT3	Chevrolet LS1 5.7 L V8	2	(United Kingdom) Stuart Hall (United Kingdom) Andy Neate (United Kingdom) Martin Short
(United Kingdom) Team Solutions	ProSport LM3000	Ford Cosworth 3.0 L V6	3	(United Kingdom) Neil Clark (United Kingdom) Peter Hobday (United Kingdom) Ian Stinton
(United Kingdom) Apex Motorsport	Jaguar XKR GT3	Jaguar 4.2 L V8	4	(United Kingdom) Michael Neuhoff (United Kingdom) Chris Ryan (United Kingdom) Stuart Scott
(United Kingdom) J & S Accessories	Porsche 993 GT2	Porsche 3.6 L Flat-6	5	(United Kingdom) Peter Cook (France) Franck Pelle (United Kingdom) Paul Hogarth (United Kingdom) Paul Livesey
(United Kingdom) KTF Group	Chrysler Viper GTS-R	Chrysler 356-T6 8.0 L V10	6	(United Kingdom) Phil Bennett (United Kingdom) Mark Dwyer (United Kingdom) Ken Finneran (United Kingdom) Robert Huff
(United Kingdom) Eclipse Motorsport	Mosler MT900R GT3	Chevrolet LS1 5.7 L V8	8	(United Kingdom) Del Delaronde (United Kingdom) George Haynes (United Kingdom) Martin Rich (United Kingdom) Adam Sharpe
(United Kingdom) Chad Motorsport	Mosler MT900R GT3	Chevrolet LS1 5.7 L V8	10	(United Kingdom) Michael McInerney (United Kingdom) Sean McInerney (Netherlands) Michael Vergers
(United Kingdom) Chad Motorsport	Porsche 997 GT3 Cup	Porsche 3.6 L Flat-6	15	(United Kingdom) Iain Dockerill (United Kingdom) Nigel Greensall (Denmark) Bo McCormick
(United Kingdom) Chesterton Commercial Holdings	Marcos Mantis GT3	Chevrolet 5.9 L V8	12	(United Kingdom) Grahame Bryant (United Kingdom) Oliver Bryant (United Kingdom) Howard Spooner
(United Kingdom) Trackpower Motorsport	TVR Sagaris	TVR 5.0 L V8	16	(United Kingdom) Michael Caine (United Kingdom) Richard Hay (United Kingdom) Richard Stanton (United Kingdom) Stuart Turvey
GTC (17 entries)
(Germany) Topper Team	Porsche 996 GT3 Cup	Porsche 3.6 L Flat-6	11	(United Kingdom) Graham Coombes (Netherlands) Dirk Schulz (Netherlands) Jan Marc Schulz (Netherlands) Jan Willems
(Germany) Tischner Motorsport	BMW M3 E46 CSL	BMW 3.2 L I6	19	(Germany) Ulrich Becker (Germany) Marco Schelp (Germany) Matthias Tischner (Germany) Michael Tischner
(United Kingdom) 911virgin.com	Porsche 996 GT3 Cup	Porsche 3.6 L Flat-6	20	(United Kingdom) Henry Firman (United Kingdom) Peter Morris (United Kingdom) Steve Rance (United Kingdom) Craig Wilkins
(United Kingdom) EDM Motorsport	BMW M3 E46 GTR	BMW 4.0 L V8	22	(United Kingdom) Peter Hardman (United Kingdom) Nick Leventis (United Kingdom) Christian Vann
(United Kingdom) Topcats Racing	Marcos Mantis	Ford 5.0 L V8	24	(United Kingdom) Jon Harrison (United Kingdom) Dominic Lesniewski (France) Luc Paillard (United Kingdom) Gerry Taylor
(United Kingdom) GTS Motorsport	BMW M3 E46 CSL	BMW 3.2 L I6	26	(United Kingdom) David Leslie (United Kingdom) Joe Macari (United Kingdom) Rob Wilson (United Kingdom) Stuart Wright
(Netherlands) Marcos Racing International	Marcos Mantis	Chevrolet 5.9 L V8	27	(Spain) José Luis Bermúdez de Castro (Netherlands) Jan de Wit (Netherlands) Cor Euser
(United Kingdom) Richard Thorne Motorsport	Morgan Aero 8	BMW N62 4.8 L V8	28	(United Kingdom) Glyn Davis (United Kingdom) Tom Jones (United Kingdom) Russell Paterson (United Kingdom) Tom Shrimpton
(Italy) Racing Box SRL	BMW M3 E46 GTR	BMW 4.0 L V8	29	(Italy) Marco Cioci (Italy) Roberto del Castello (Italy) Giuseppe Perazzini
(Denmark) Buddha Motorsport	Aston Martin Vantage N24	Aston Martin 4.3 L V8	30	(Denmark) Jan Kalmar (United Kingdom) Chris Porritt (Denmark) Henrik Moller Sørensen (Denmark) Jacob Tackman-Thomson
(United Kingdom) ISL Motorsport	Marcos Mantis	Ford 5.0 L V8	31	(United Kingdom) Charles Bateman (United Kingdom) Alun Edwards (United Kingdom) Robin Jones
(Austria) Duller Motorsport	BMW M3 E46 GTR	BMW 4.0 L V8	32	(Italy) Luca Cappellari (Switzerland) Marcel Fässler (Switzerland) Gabriele Gardel (Italy) Fabrizio Gollin
(United Kingdom) Moore International Motorsport	BMW M3 E36 GTR	BMW 3.0 L I6	34	(United Kingdom) Ryan Hooker (United Kingdom) Willie Moore (United Kingdom) Peter Seldon (United Kingdom) Paul White
(United Kingdom) CTR Alfatune	Porsche 993 RSR	Porsche 3.6 L Flat-6	35	(United Kingdom) Phil Brough (United Kingdom) John Clonis (United Kingdom) Malcolm MacAdam (United Kingdom) Paul White
(United Kingdom) Jemco Racing	Marcos Mantis	Ford 5.0 L V8	36	(United Kingdom) Kevin Hancock (United Kingdom) Nigel Rata (United Kingdom) Nick Reynolds (United Kingdom) Leigh Smart
(United Kingdom) Paragon Motorsport	Porsche 996 GT3 Cup	Porsche 3.6 L Flat-6	39	(United Kingdom) Chris Harris (United Kingdom) Andrew Purdie (United Kingdom) Adrian Slater (United Kingdom) Mark Sumpter
(United Kingdom) RJN Motorsport	Nissan 350Z	Nissan VQ35HR 3.5 L V6	40	(United Kingdom) Alex Buncombe (United Kingdom) Owen Mildenhall (United Kingdom) Anthony Reid (Denmark) Kurt Thiim
Class 1 (14 entries)
(United Kingdom) Team Scandal	Lotus Exige	Rover 1.8 L K-series I4	41	(United Kingdom) Martin Dower (United Kingdom) Scott Fitzgerald (United Kingdom) Chris Randall (United Kingdom) Simon Scuffham
(Germany) www.red-motorsport.de	Lotus Exige	Rover 1.8 L K-series I4	42	(Germany) Jerome Bruhat (United Kingdom) Martin Richter (Germany) Martin Roos (Germany) Wilfried Schawohl (Germany) Mirco Schultis
(United Kingdom) Geoff Steel Racing	BMW M3 E36	BMW 3.0 L I6	43	(United Kingdom) Steve Bell (United Kingdom) Gareth Howell (United Kingdom) Simon Leith (United Kingdom) Michael Symons
(United Kingdom) CWS Racing	BMW M3 E46 CSL	BMW 3.2 L I6	45	(Germany) Frank Nohring (United Kingdom) Matthew Truelove (United Kingdom) Colin White
(United Kingdom) Intersport Racing	BMW M3 E46 CSL	BMW 3.2 L I6	46	(United Kingdom) Kevin Clarke (United Kingdom) Andrew Donaldson (United Kingdom) Ian Donaldson (United Kingdom) Mark Donaldson
(United Kingdom) Duke Video	BMW M3 E36 GTR	BMW 3.0 L I6	47	(United Kingdom) Peter Duke (Australia) Alan Gow (United Kingdom) Adrian Watt (United Kingdom) Chris Wilson
(United Kingdom) GP Motorsport	BMW M3 E36 GTR	BMW 3.0 L I6	49	(United Kingdom) Hamish Irvine (United Kingdom) John Irvine (United Kingdom) Ed Lovett (United Kingdom) Guy Povey
(United Kingdom) Simmons Printers	BMW M3 E36	BMW 3.0 L I6	51	(United Kingdom) David Back (United Kingdom) Robert Day (United Kingdom) Paul Phipps (United Kingdom) Stephen Shanly
(United Kingdom) Windrush Motorsport	BMW M3 E36	BMW 3.0 L I6	52	(United Kingdom) Raun Austin (United Kingdom) Alan Bonner (United Kingdom) Mich Millett (United Kingdom) Adam Wiseberg
(United Kingdom) Simply Racing	Porsche 964 RS	Porsche 3.3 L Flat-6	54	(United Kingdom) James Brodie (United Kingdom) Andreas Demetriou (United Kingdom) Gregor Fisken (United Kingdom) Piers Masarati
(United Kingdom) Torquespeed Motorsport	BMW M3 E36	BMW 3.0 L I6	55	(United Kingdom) Rob Barff (United Kingdom) Phil Cutts (United Kingdom) Dominic Jackson (United Kingdom) Steve Warburton
(United Kingdom) RJN Motorsport	Nissan 350Z	Nissan VQ35HR 3.5 L V6	57	(United Kingdom) John Backer (United Kingdom) Jethro Bovindon (United Kingdom) Michael Mallock (United Kingdom) Richard Meaden
(United Kingdom) Moore Racing	BMW M3 E36	BMW 3.0 L I6	58	(United Kingdom) Will Curtis (United Kingdom) Paul Fenton (United Kingdom) Mike Gardiner (United Kingdom) Sarah Reader
(United Kingdom) Phatgixer Racing	BMW M3 E36	BMW 3.0 L I6	59	(United Kingdom) Phil Bennett (United Kingdom) Angus Dawe (United Kingdom) Michael Richardson (United Kingdom) Jason White
Class 2 (7 entries)
(United Kingdom) ELR	Honda Civic Type R	Honda 2.0 L K20A I4	62	(United Kingdom) Dave Allan (United States) Mark Hein (United Kingdom) Peter Venn
(United Kingdom) Moore Racing	Honda Civic Type R	Honda 2.0 L K20A I4	63	(United Kingdom) Jonathan Berney (United Kingdom) Gary Coulson (Germany) Hubert Hinklehoffer (United Kingdom) Miles Hulford
(United Kingdom) TJH Motorsport	Honda Civic Type R	Honda 2.0 L K20A I4	65	(United Kingdom) Paul Collis (United Kingdom) Simon Mason (United Kingdom) Jonathan Ridley-Holloway (United Kingdom) Paul Taft
(United Kingdom) Shawn Taylor Racing	Nissan 350Z	Nissan VQ35HR 3.5 L V6	69	(United Kingdom) Tom Ballentyne (United Kingdom) Stuart Brooks (United Kingdom) Andrew Radford (United Kingdom) Shawn Taylor
(United Kingdom) County EMC Team	Porsche 968	Porsche 3.0 L I4	70	(United Kingdom) Art Atwal (United Kingdom) Peter Erceg (United Kingdom) Peter Garrod (United Kingdom) Marc Stanford
(United Kingdom) County EMC Team	Porsche 968	Porsche 3.0 L I4	71	(United Kingdom) Lali Atwal (United Kingdom) Ceiron Brewer (United Kingdom) Frank Cortes (United Kingdom) Alex Eacock
(United Kingdom) Mardi Gras Motorsport	Honda Integra Type-R (DC5)	Honda 2.0 L K20A I4	76	(United Kingdom) Stephen Day (United Kingdom) Richard Meins (United Kingdom) Desmond Smail
Class 3 (6 entries)
(United Kingdom) Pete Daniels Motorsport	Honda Civic Type R	Honda 2.0 L K20A I4	67	(United Kingdom) David Abbott (United Kingdom) Jamie Ackers (United Kingdom) Malcolm Edeson (United Kingdom) Michael Hartley (United Kingdom) David Nye
(United Kingdom) Pete Daniels Motorsport	Honda Civic Type R	Honda 2.0 L K20A I4	68	(United Kingdom) Peter Daniels (United Kingdom) Malcolm Edeson (United Kingdom) Michael Hartley (United Kingdom) Fiona Leggate
(United Kingdom) OJP Sport Racing	Honda Civic	Honda 2.0 L K20A2 I4	72	(United Kingdom) Chris Davies (United Kingdom) Michael Nippers (United Kingdom) Mat Perkins (United Kingdom) Steve Griffiths
(United Kingdom) Team Thrush	Honda Integra Type-R (DC2)	Honda 1.8 L K20A2 I4	73	(United Kingdom) Ian Bankhurst (United Kingdom) Richard Ince (United Kingdom) Nick Padmore (United Kingdom) Austin Reynolds
(United Kingdom) DC Motorsport	MG ZR 190	MG 1.8 L K-Series I4	74	(United Kingdom) Doug Cole (Sweden) Mats Wahlgren (United Kingdom) Robin Walker
(United Kingdom) Intecnly Racing	Honda Integra Type-R (DC2)	Honda 1.8 L K20A2 I4	75	(United Kingdom) Darren Anley (United Kingdom) Paul Armitage (United Kingdom) David Joseph (United Kingdom) Ian Kilpatrick
Class 4 (5 entries)
(Netherlands) Marcos Racing International	BMW 120d	BMW 2.0 L I4	77	(United Kingdom) Rupert Douglas-Pennant (United Kingdom) Tony Rodriguez (United Kingdom) Mark Smith
(United Kingdom) Team Top Gear	BMW 330d	BMW 3.0 L I6	78	(United Kingdom) Jeremy Clarkson (United Kingdom) "The Stig" (United Kingdom) James May (United Kingdom) Richard Hammond
(United Kingdom) TH Motorsport	Volkswagen Golf Diesel	Volkswagen 1.9 L I4	79	(United Kingdom) John George (United Kingdom) Ken Lark (United Kingdom) Tim Saunders (United Kingdom) Nick Starkey
(United Kingdom) Saxon Motorsport	BMW 330d	BMW 3.0 L I6	80	(United Kingdom) Clint Bardwell (United Kingdom) Nick Barrow (United Kingdom) Richard Corbett (United Kingdom) David Mountain
(Italy) Racing Box SRL	BMW 330d	BMW 3.0 L I6	81	(Italy) Riccardo Azzoli (Italy) Alessandro Bonetti (Italy) Riccardo Cinti (Italy) Fernando Geri

== Qualifying ==
The grid for the race was decided by times set in day qualifying. Night qualifying was held as a practice event ahead of the actual race's night segment.

=== Day qualifying ===
Stuart Hall set the fastest time of the session in the Rollcentre Mosler MT900R GT3, a 1:54.027 on the car's 14th flying lap. In GTC, the #32 Duller BMW had set the fastest lap, Intersport's #46 car had qualified on pole in Class 1 with TJH Motorsport on Class 2 pole, Team Thrush set the pace in Class 3 as Saxon Motorsport put their BMW 330d 6 places ahead of the next Class 4 car, in 47th overall. Simply Racing's Porsche 964 hadn't set a time as the engine had failed and the KTF Chrysler hadn't met noise levels with certain restrictions in place so it could not take part.

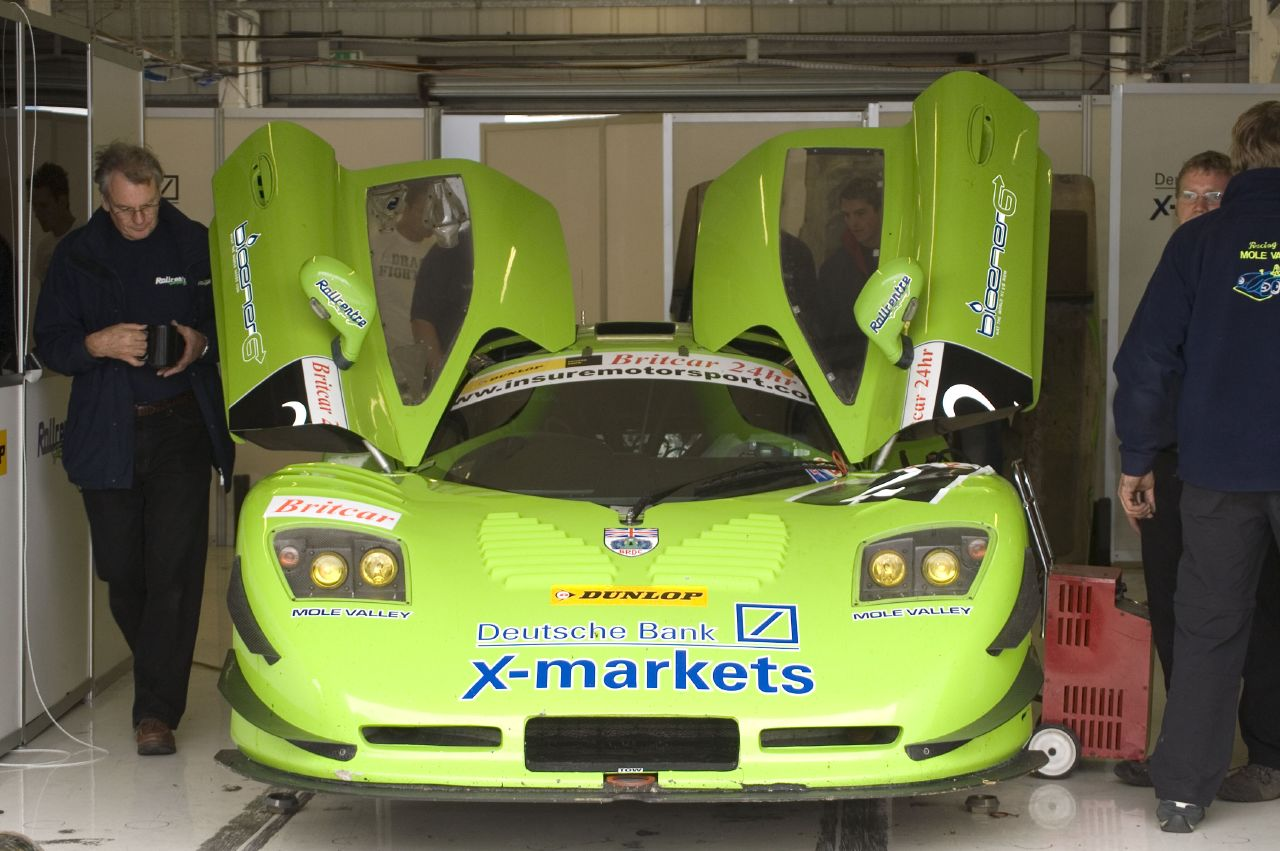
The Rollcentre Racing Mosler MT900R GT3 of Stuart Hall, Andy Neate and Martin Short qualified on pole position.

Fastest in class in bold.

Pos.	Class	No.	Team	Time
1	**GT3**	**2**	**Rollcentre Racing with Deutsche Bank**	**1:54.027**
2	GT3	1	Duller Motorsport	1:54.219
3	GT3	10	Chad Motorsport	1:56.004
4	**GTC**	**32**	**Duller Motorsport**	**1:57.602**
5	GT3	15	Chad Motorsport	1:58.341
6	GT3	16	Trackpower Motorsport	1:59.177
7	GT3	8	Eclipse Motorsport	1:59.214
8	GTC	26	GTS Motorsport	1:59.892
9	GTC	26	EDM Motorsport	2:00.257
10	GTC	24	Topcats Racing	2:00.453
11	GTC	39	Paragon Motorsport	2:00.816
12	**1**	**46**	**Intersport Racing**	**2:01.592**
13	GT3	12	Chesterton Commercial Holdings	2:01.620
14	GT3	5	J & S Accessories	2:01.644
15	1	41	Team Scandal	2:01.834
16	1	43	Geoff Steel Racing	2:02.091
17	GTC	40	RJN Motorsport	2:02.322
18	GTC	29	Racing Box SRL	2:03.651
19	GT3	4	Apex Motorsport	2:03.749
20	GTC	20	911virgin.com	2:03.798
21	GTC	34	Moore International Motorsport	2:04.747
22	GT3	11	Topper Team	2:05.135
23	GTC	19	Tischner Motorsport	2:05.147
24	GTC	30	Buddha Motorsport	2:05.858
25	GTC	27	Marcos Racing International	2:06.018
26	1	58	Moore Racing	2:06.212
27	GTC	36	Jemco Racing	2:06.229
28	1	47	Duke Video	2:06.445
29	GTC	31	ISL Motorsport	2:07.745
30	1	42	www.red-motorsport.de	2:07.865
31	1	55	Torquespeed Motorsport	2:08.211
32	**2**	**65**	**TJH Motorsport**	**2:08.786**
33	1	45	CWS Racing	2:08.815
34	GT3	3	Team Solutions	2:10.346
35	GTC	35	CTR Alfatune	2:11.026
36	1	57	RJN Motorsport	2:11.306
37	1	51	Simmons Printers	2:11.893
38	2	62	ELR	2:12.328
39	**3**	**73**	**Team Thrush**	**2:12.328**
40	2	76	Mardi Gras Motorsport	2:12.337
41	GTC	28	Richard Thorne Motorsport	2:12.621
42	1	59	Phatgixer Racing	2:13.582
43	3	74	DC Motorsport	2:15.119
44	3	68	Pete Daniels Motorsport	2:15.562
45	1	49	GP Motorsport	2:15.641
46	1	52	Windrush Motorsport	2:15.832
47	**4**	**80**	**Saxon Motorsport**	**2:16.985**
48	3	75	Intecnly Racing	2:17.832
49	2	71	County EMC Team	2:17.946
50	2	69	Shawn Taylor Racing	2:18.410
51	3	67	Pete Daniels Motorsport	2:19.281
52	3	70	County EMC Team	2:20.242
53	4	81	Racing Box SRL	2:20.393
54	4	36	Moore Racing	2:20.840
55	4	77	Marcos Racing International	2:21.021
56	4	78	Team Top Gear	2:21.769
57	4	79	TH Motorsport	2:24.796
58	3	72	OJP Sport Racing	2:25.165
59	1	54	Simply Racing	No time
60	GT3	7	KTF Group	No time

=== Night qualifying ===
This session required every driver in each car to do at least 3 laps. In the second session, a Mosler was yet again at the top of the times, this being the #10 Chad Motorsport car of Michael Vergers and Michael and Sean McInerney. In GTC and Class, BMWs were again on top, with Duller Motorsport and Intersport dominating their classes. This was followed by TJH Motorsport yet again beating ELR to the fastest time in Class 2. The Boston Bowl MG ZR 190 of Cole, Wahlgren and Walker had finished the session over a session quicker than Team Thrush's Honda Integra. Team Top Gear, completely new to endurance racing but supported by John Thorne's Thorney Motorsport, had put their car in 1st in Class 4, with Ben Collins, otherwise known as The Stig, setting a 2:18.296. Woes would strike the newcomers though, as during May's stint, the turbo and clutch had gone, putting their start of the race in serious doubt.

Fastest in class in bold.

Pos.	Class	No.	Team	Time
1	**GT3**	**10**	**Chad Motorsport**	**1:55.527**
2	GT3	1	Duller Motorsport	1:58.213
3	GT3	2	Rollcentre Racing with Deutsche Bank	1:59.665
4	**GTC**	**32**	**Duller Motorsport**	**2:00.101**
5	GT3	16	Trackpower Motorsport	2:01.396
6	GT3	15	Chad Motorsport	2:01.927
7	GTC	26	GTS Motorsport	2:02.852
8	GTC	27	Marcos Racing International	2:02.971
9	GT3	7	KTF Group	2:03.381
10	GTC	40	RJN Motorsport	2:03.495
11	GTC	24	Topcats Racing	2:03.863
12	GT3	11	Topper Team	2:03.916
13	GT3	8	Eclipse Motorsport	2:03.933
14	GTC	26	EDM Motorsport	2:04.202
15	GTC	39	Paragon Motorsport	2:04.991
16	GTC	29	Racing Box SRL	2:05.341
17	**1**	**46**	**Intersport Racing**	**2:06.330**
18	GTC	19	Tischner Motorsport	2:06.459
19	GTC	34	Moore International Motorsport	2:06.740
20	1	41	Team Scandal	2:06.844
21	1	43	Geoff Steel Racing	2:06.883
22	1	54	Simply Racing	2:07.831
23	GTC	30	Buddha Motorsport	2:07.940
24	GT3	4	Apex Motorsport	2:08.579
25	GT3	12	Chesterton Commercial Holdings	2:09.428
26	GT3	3	Team Solutions	2:09.882
27	1	55	Torquespeed Motorsport	2:10.171
28	1	47	Duke Video	2:10.348
29	1	58	Moore Racing	2:10.518
30	GTC	20	911virgin.com	2:10.581
31	1	51	Simmons Printers	2:11.666
32	1	59	Phatgixer Racing	2:12.103
33	GT3	5	J & S Accessories	2:12.106
34	2	76	Mardi Gras Motorsport	2:12.113
35	**2**	**65**	**TJH Motorsport**	**2:12.656**
36	1	42	www.red-motorsport.de	2:12.804
37	GTC	36	Jemco Racing	2:13.103
38	2	62	ELR	2:13.232
39	1	45	CWS Racing	2:13.966
40	1	49	GP Motorsport	2:14.497
41	1	57	RJN Motorsport	2:14.644
42	GTC	35	CTR Alfatune	2:15.171
43	**3**	**74**	**DC Motorsport**	**2:18.016**
44	**4**	**78**	**Team Top Gear**	**2:18.296**
45	2	69	Shawn Taylor Racing	2:18.773
46	GTC	28	Richard Thorne Motorsport	2:19.164
47	4	81	Racing Box SRL	2:19.221
48	3	73	Team Thrush	2:19.709
49	3	68	Pete Daniels Motorsport	2:19.822
50	3	67	Pete Daniels Motorsport	2:20.478
51	1	52	Windrush Motorsport	2:20.483
52	2	70	County EMC Team	2:21.104
53	4	36	Moore Racing	2:21.422
54	2	71	County EMC Team	2:23.017
55	3	75	Intecnly Racing	2:23.800
56	GTC	31	ISL Motorsport	2:24.433
57	4	77	Marcos Racing International	2:25.031
58	4	79	TH Motorsport	2:27.224
59	3	72	OJP Sport Racing	2:51.344
60	4	80	Saxon Motorsport	No time

== Race ==
=== Report ===
Pre-race

While having lunch, a few hours before the race start, Clarkson, May and Hammond discussed who would go out in the car at the start, with their vote being inconclusive, they asked for the assistance of the spectators, who almost unanimously voted for The Stig to start the race. As more than 50 cars made their way onto the grid, the #78 BMW, among other cars, was still in the garage. 20 minutes to go, the car's engine was working. The field had begun to set off on the formation lap, with some cars absent; #5 J&S Porsche due to a valve, the #16 TVR Sagaris of Michael Caine had failed to start and would subsequently start from the pits. The Top Gear BMW was fuelled, with Collins getting in the car as Clarkson hurried them out of the garage, the BMW cruising at pit-lane speed to join five other cars starting from the pits; the #79 VW, #63 Honda, #45 BMW, #5 Porsche and the #16 TVR.

Hour 1

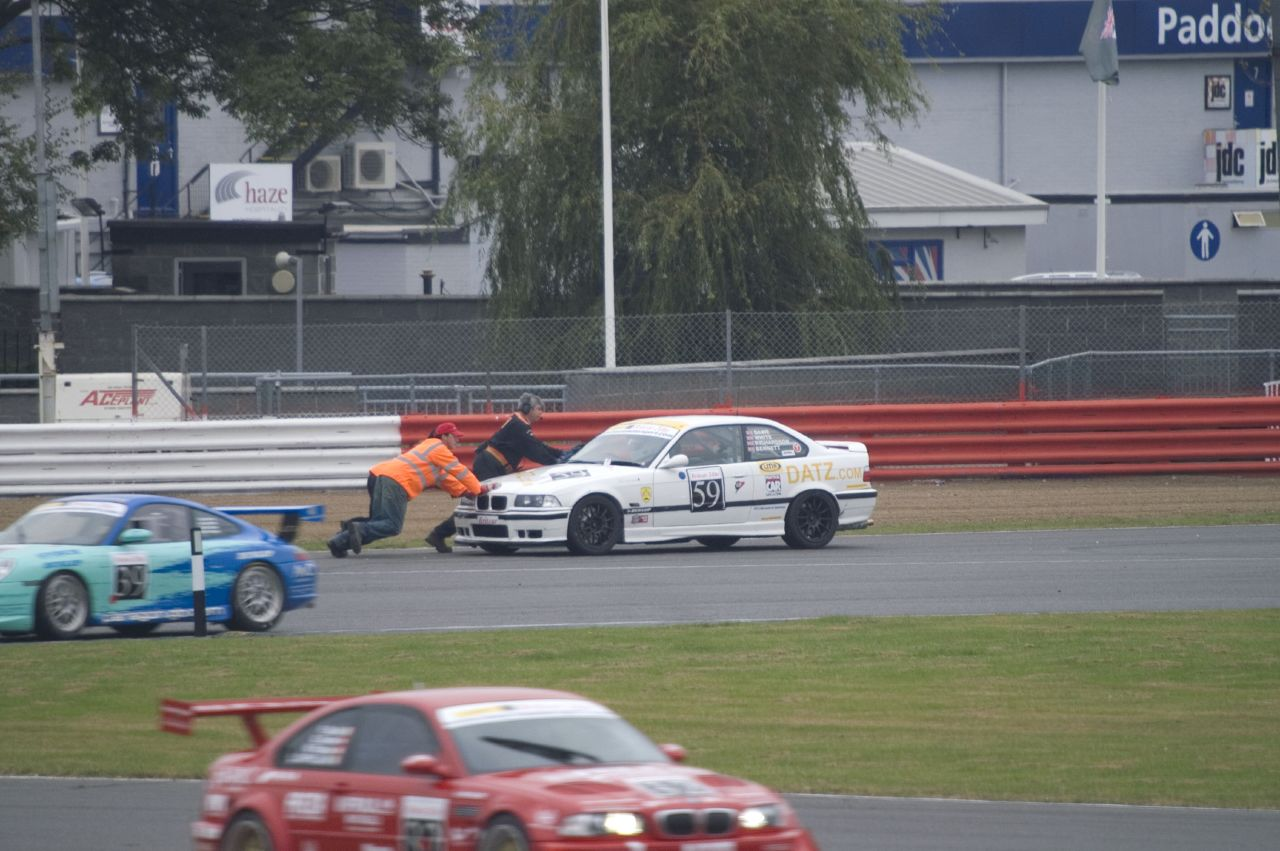
The Phatgixer Racing BMW M3 E36 stopped on track at Brooklands, retiring after 20 laps.

The race had begun, Vergers took the inside line ahead of Hall into Copse, followed by Werner in the #1 BMW. Team Top Gear's BMW had made it to the end of the pit lane just as the KTF Group Chrysler Viper GTS-R (60th on the grid) crossed the line, meaning they had started the race. Quickly, Vergers fell behind both the Rollcentre Mosler and the Duller BMW by lap 3, with the #1 car taking the lead on the next lap from Hall's Mosler. The first retirement of the race had also occurred on this lap, the #5 J&S Porsche had blown its new engine already. The #59 Phatgixer BMW had stopped on track at Brooklands, only completing 20 laps. The Rollcentre team quickly hit further trouble as Alan Bonner in #52 Windrush BMW collided with Hall at Brooklands as he was trying to lap the backmarker, this and a spin at Becketts, put him down to third place as the #10 Chad Mosler chased after the 2006 race-winning BMW, although 20 seconds adrift. Robert Huff, who was driving the KTF Group Viper, had managed to move the ex-Le Mans class winner from 60th to 8th overall in one hour. From 59th, counting the pit-lane start, the Team Top Gear BMW, driven by Stig, was up to an astonishing 45th place and only second in class. As the first hour had been completed, Werner was nearly 40 seconds clear of Hall, as Vergers had fallen behind the latter by over a lap.

Hour 2

The #10 Chad Mosler pits with Vergers swapping with Michael McInerney. At this stage, Werner had extended the gap from the #2 Mosler to 50 seconds, as Duller's second car, the #32 BMW M3 E46 GTR had taken third place. Soon after, Hall headed into the pits for the Rollcentre team's first of many stops, making it a Duller Motorsport 1-2 for the time being. 20 minutes later, Werner pulls into the pits, for Dieter Quester to get in the car, which allows Fabrizio Gollin to unlap himself and subsequently take the lead of the race 90 minutes in. The #15 Chad Motorsport car of Greensall now leads after Gollin pits, not long after taking the lead the Porsche heads into the pit lane for its first stop, as David Leslie takes the lead in the #26 GTS BMW which is yet to pit. A problem with the fuel injection system forced Stig to pit the #78 BMW. Meanwhile, the #27 Marcos of Cor Euser's Marcos Racing International team, had been called into the pits for an oil leak, then hit further troubles due to noise too loud for limits currently in place, not receiving the clearance from scrutineers. A jammed wheel nut forced the pitting of the #15 Chad Porsche, losing valuable time and dropping it far outside of the top twenty. The #58 Moore Racing BMW had a wheel come off, resulting in the three-wheeled M3 E36 driven by Gardiner crawling back to the pits. Leslie pits just before 2 hours are up to hand over to Joe Macari with the Duller Motorsport BMW Z4 M Coupé retaking the lead however only 20 seconds clear of Stuart hall at the 2-hour mark.

Hour 3

By this point, Kevin Clarke's #46 Intersport BMW had retired after only completing 13 laps, leaving the Donaldson duo drive-less for the rest of the weekend. Quester was leading Hall by 10 seconds but the Mosler had quickly closed down the gap to just 2 seconds until a backmarker spun going into the Vale chicane, allowing Hall to get ahead of Quester who was lapping another car. At this time, the #78 BMW is able to rejoin the race, but with James May at the wheel as Stig had exited the car having only completed half of his planned stint. The #27 Marcos had finally rejoined the race after passing a noise test as the #15 Chad Porsche gets back on track but down in 44th. 30 minutes into hour 3, the #3 Mosler is finally brought in for its first driver change, 20 seconds clear of Quester, with Andy Neate taking over driving duties, with the ex-BTCC driver rejoining in fourth place as George Haynes brings the #8 Mosler in for Del Delaronde for his first stint. Neate had begun to lap quicker than the next three cars in front of him, which had not pitted yet. The KTF Group Viper had rejoined the race after Huff brought it in over an hour ago, Ken Finneran at the wheel this time but the car was not out for long as another oil leak made the car pit-bound. Meanwhile, the #40 RJN Nissan was handed a black and orange flag for missing a fuel cap, which cost them a lot of time in the pits trying to find another.

Hour 4

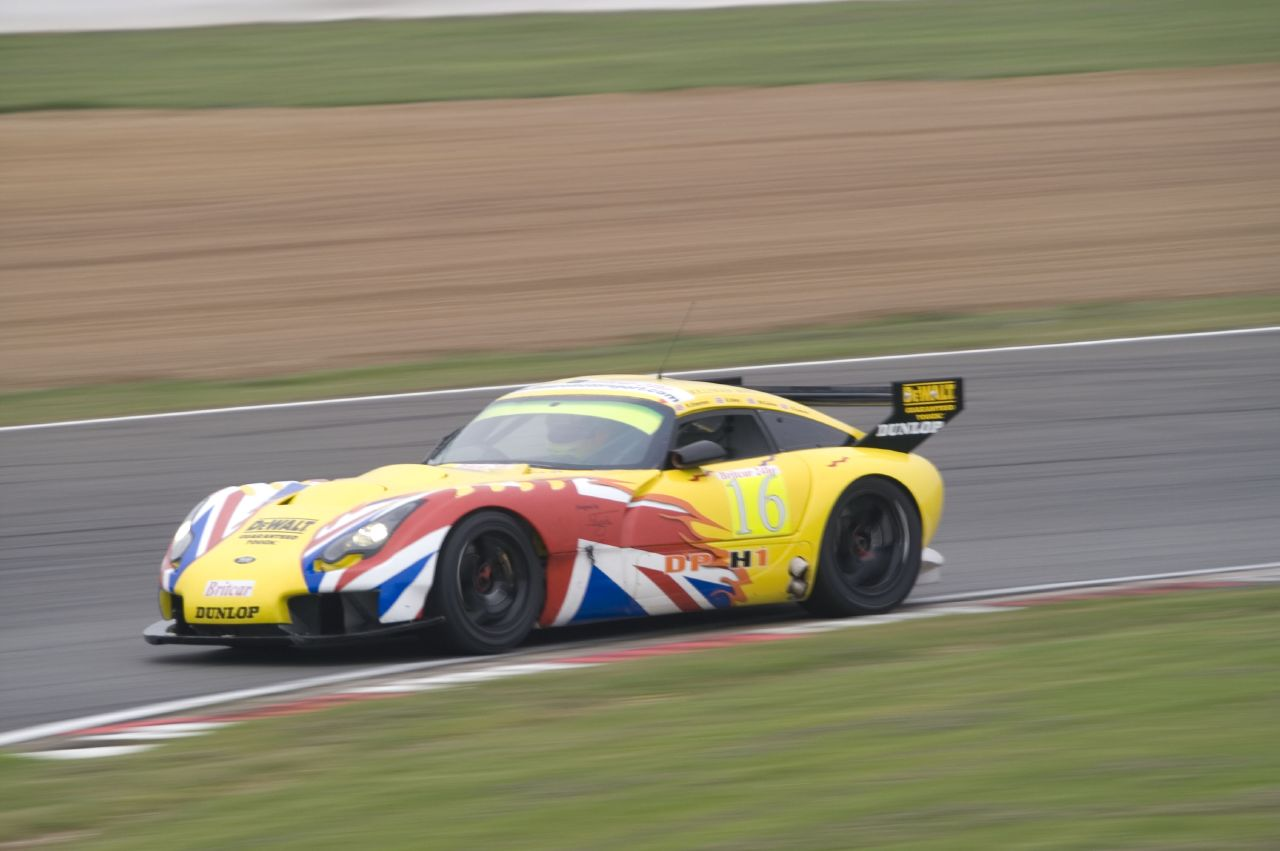
The Trackpower Motorsport TVR Sagaris crashed out at Copse after completing only 30 laps.

By hour 4 of the race, the bright sky has faded and drivers are told to turn on their lights. After mechanical problems hindering its performance, on its 30th lap, the #16 Trackpower TVR has a massive collision with the barrier going out of Copse and into Maggotts, bringing out the Safety Car, this helping Andy Neate close the gap to the second place GTS Motorsport BMW which in turn is only 20 behind the leading Duller BMW. Both the #1 BMW and #10 Mosler are handed a stop-go penalty for passing under yellow flags, Jamie Campbell-Walter, now in the car, manages to retain his lead after serving the penalty. Eventually, Neate manages to taken second from the #26 BMW, shortly after though, Neate pits to hand over to Martin Short. The #4 Apex Motorsport Jaguar XKR GT3 gets called into the pits for a noise problem, as Jeremy Clarkson starts his first stint. The safety car comes out for a second time due to oil down at Stowe.

Hour 5

After around 25 minutes, the safety car pulls into the pits, the #26 GTS BMW immediately heads into the pits for a refuel. The #1 and #32 Duller BMWs lead the #2 Rollcentre Mosler with the #26 GTS BMW still in the top four as the #39 Paragon Porsche and #24 Topcat Marcos are laps down on it.

Hour 6

Slowly making its way up the order, the #10 Mosler has moved into 12th place. The Apex Jaguar has rejoined the field, only just inside the top 30 positions as the #15 Porsche up into 32nd after the wheel nut issues. Trouble strikes the Topcats crew as the Marcos' rear lights stop working, forcing it to make a pit stop, massively impacting its chances for the GTC class win. The #32 Duller car pits with left rear damage, losing over 10 laps in the process. Michael Vergers pits the Chad Motorsport Mosler due to a suspected engine-turned oil issue, repairs cost them dearly, pushing them down to 16th. Campbell-Walter pits the BMW Z4 to allow Johannes Stuck to start his first stint in the car. The EDM Motorsport BMW had pitted due to a problem with the driver's seat, despite this, the car had gotten back into the top ten before another issue forcing Christian Vann to pit, dropping him outside the top twenty. Further troubles for the #55 Torquespeed team after they had been running outside the top twenty for the entire race so far until a broken front strut bar had to be replaced, pushing Rob Barff further down the order.

Hour 7

In the pitch-black night, the Safety Car is once again deployed due to debris down somewhere on the circuit, using this to their advantage, the Rollcentre Mosler pits, 4 laps down on the leading Duller Motorsport BMW, the team also changing brake pads while they can afford to, only losing a lap. Meanwhile, The Chad Motorsport Porsche has put itself back into the top twenty, 19th overall. Stuart Hall pits the Mosler with an alternator problem, costing them a lot of time. The #26 GTS car, 2nd at the time, Rob Wilson replaces Joe Macari in the BMW. The Chad Motorsport team's bad luck would again impact their race, as Michael Vergers collided with Richard Hammond and caused major damage to the car. Hammond had allowed several cars to overtake and lap him going out of Chapel, then moved back towards the racing line not realising the Mosler was there and made heavy contact. Sparks flew as Hammond parked the wrecked BMW on the right-hand side of the back straight as the Mosler continued on a couple-hundred feet, the front of the car badly damaged. The Top Gear BMW also sustained severe damage to the left-hand side; a broken wishbone, brake disc, a damaged engine and considerable bodywork damage. This boosted Chad Motorsport's other car, the #15 Porsche up the order, now 18th overall. Meanwhile, Rollcentre had successfully changed the alternator, the Mosler rejoining the race in 11th place.

Hour 8

The KTF Group Chrysler Viper GTS-R had just gotten back on track before a prop shaft failure confirmed the car's retirement after a dismal weekend. The GP Motorsport has retired from the race after a hard hit into the barriers and subsequent roll at Copse with Ed Lovett at the wheel. Meanwhile, the #47 Duke Video has also retired from brake issues, after contact with Fiona Leggate. The Rollcentre Mosler has quickly moved through the field and into 5th position, only four laps behind the Duller Motorsport BMW M3.

Hour 9

The Chad Mosler has once again rejoined the race, far outside of the top thirty. Martin Rich in the #8 Eclipse Mosler has started to close the gap between himself and Stuck, still over 10 laps ahead. Unfortunately, the Mosler woes would hit the Eclipse team, driveshaft problems hindering their charge as the Paragon Porsche and Duller M3 moving into the top three as a result.

Hour 10

Chad Motorsport has called in the Mosler as the engine is experiencing problems from the incident with the Top Gear BMW which has recently rejoined after repairs made to the car were deemed safe to run. Michael Mallock pits the #57 Nissan, accidentally turning on the central locking system, but was able to press the release button. The #10 Mosler rejoins the race after some repairs were made. Later on, the Mosler being involved in a collision with the #41 Lotus. Jamie Campbell-Walter pitted with a healthy lead, giving Johannes Stuck his second stint in the BMW Z4. Duller Motorsport leads 1–2 with the #32 car still over 10 laps behind.

Hour 11

The battle for 10th is heated, the #62 ELR Honda and the #28 Morgan. Not long after, Tom Shrimpton pits to make a scheduled driver change and a brake pad change, the car nor driver not putting a foot wrong. The #65 Class 2 TJH Honda up into the top 10, nearing a top 5 overall position, only 1 lap behind the CWS Racing BMW, eventually overtaking the #45 car as it makes a pit stop.

Hour 12

After its troubles, the #15 Chad Porsche has moved up to 10th, behind the older 964 car run by Simply Racing. After the team's slight delay in its most recent pit stop, the #57 Nissan slotted into 14th position, with the Apex Motorsport Jaguar XKR GT3 18th in its first-ever race meeting. Meanwhile, the Chesterton Commercial Holdings Marcos' gearbox problems have come back to bite them, with the team making a new gearbox out of the two broken ones whilst the ISL Marcos has been missing third gear for a large portion of the race but is still running. Low-visibility is becoming a concerning factor as the Safety Car is on stand-by. With the BMW repaired to an operational condition, Team Top Gear made the decision to put The Stig in the car, in an attempt to make up for horribly lost time.

Hours 13, 14 and 15

Just as half-distance is reached, fog starts to roll in. The TJH Honda Civic Type R pits, dropping outside of the top ten as Adam Sharpe brings in the Eclipse Mosler with a problematic left-rear driveshaft once again, only taking 12 minutes to replace. Further drama would occur in the pitlane as a Saxon Motorsport mechanic is injured as the car is dropped off the jack, fortunately, the injury is not severe. The fog and mist continue to get worse, visibility becoming very limited. The race is then suspended, with the remaining cars lining up on the pit straight in parc ferme conditions until it is safe to continue. The suspension would remain until 7 am, nearing the end of Hour 15.

Hour 16

The race is back underway as trouble for the Topcats team after running so consistently in the top 10 for so long; a broken differential forces the Marcos Mantis into the pit lane for nearly an hour. James May, now in the #78 BMW, accidentally overran his pit box, partially blocking the Saxon Motorsport's BMW from exiting the garage. The #57 RJN Motorsport car's engine starts to overheat due to a broken fan, originally thinking they had fixed the problem, the car went back out but was soon back in the pits. A miscommunication caused the #26 GTS car to pit four times causing it to lose positions. Moore Racing's race went from good to catastrophic as both cars had issues; the #34 BMW suffering from a broken driveshaft as not long after the #63 Honda loses its right-front wheel coming out of Abbey. The Paragon Motorsport Porsche takes second place away from the #32 Duller car as Fabrizio Gollin hops into the BMW M3 GTR, rejoining less than a lap behind the Porsche.

Hour 17

The Safety Car is sent out on track as the recovery of the Jemco Racing Marcos Mantis is ongoing at Bridge, after an off for the #36 car. During this, both Paragon and Rollcentre decide to pit their cars, but the Mosler was held as the field made its way past behind the Safety Car, after the Porsche had left the pits, but a quick stint from the Mosler and a scheduled brake change for the #39 car meant that Rollcentre came out on top and in third position overall. An engine mount halts the progress of the Team Scandal Lotus as the already-battered Chad Motorsport Mosler has a problem with a broken wishbone.

Hour 18

The Chesterton Marcos, with its "new" gearbox, turns out to only have fifth gear now, with Oliver Bryant saying the car is still capable of times of 2:05. The Jemco Marcos is back out on track after rear damper put Leigh Smart off and into the gravel at Bridge, the car running just out of the top 40. The leading Duller Motorsport BMW Z4 is beginning to gradually lap its sister M3, 17 laps at the moment as the Rollcentre Mosler is on a charge to at least catch the latter. A notable team and bunch of cars throughout the race were the County EMC Porsche 968s which have had a clear race, both running relatively close to each other, rounding out the top 20 cars.

Hour 19

The #24 Topcats Marcos has left the pit lane but suddenly ground to a halt at Brooklands, bringing out the Safety Car again. The #10 Chad Mosler in a small bit of trouble as a spin going out of Vale costs it some time. Nick Leventis' EDM BMW makes contact with the Mardi Gras Honda, damaging the exhaust, sending the GTC Class car down the order while repairs are made. Meanwhile, the #28 Morgan has run trouble-free for the entirety of the race. Duller Motorsport's BMW M3 hits trouble as the smoke billows from it in front of Steve Warburton on the pit straight, this allows Rollcentre and Paragon to grab second and third, leaving the M3 far behind while attention is given to the #32.

Hour 20

The Stig, now in the #78 car, was trying to gain more positions, though this would be obstructed as the front splitter had come off, as well as a fuel leak. Stig stayed in the car so he could continue after the leak was fixed. Torquespeed is the next BMW to have a problem, as smoke pours from the car with Warburton at the wheel. Fortunately, the team manage to amend the problem and sends the car back out without a problem. At the RJN Motorsport team, the #40 car has lost third and fifth gear, resulting in a second gearbox change. Despite an aerodynamic disadvantage, Stig's handling of the car was phenomenal. He later pitted to hand over to Richard Hammond, who was in his final stint. The #32 Duller car returns to the pits on a flatbed truck, an assumed gearbox failure. While this is happening, the #15 Chad Porsche, after its wheel nut issues, has climbed back through the field, now less than a minute off of the GTS BMW, which will soon become the battle for 4th place as the Duller car is out for the time being. Fortunately, Duller has worked wonders in replacing a right driveshaft, the M3 rejoining in fourth place although five laps down on the #39 Porsche. The #63 Moore Honda's engine finally gives way to damage with Miles Hulford at the wheel.

Hour 21

BMW woes continue to occur as GTS Motorsport BMW's draftshaft fails dropping it to ninth. A puncture occurs on the #32 Duller BMW just as or after Marcel Fässler, the #45 CWS Racing doing well to avoid him and carry on as Fässler drags his BMW back to the pits. Dirk Werner hops into the leading BMW for the penultimate stint, 23 laps ahead of the Rollcentre Mosler. Apex Motorsport's Jaguar rejoins the race after a brief stop in the pits. While sitting 15th overall and second in Class 4, the #77 Marcos Racing International BMW 120d pulls off and onto the grass on the Hangar Straight, not requiring a Safety Car.

Hour 22

The #15 Porsche moves up into the top five as Martin Rich pits the Eclipse Mosler, George Haynes taking over. Trouble for the Rollcentre Racing team as the car loses every gear but fifth. The #77 Marcos Racing BMW returns to the pits, an empty diesel tank resulting in its stoppage on the Hangar Straight. Jeremy Clarkson got into the Top Gear BMW 330d for his final stint. The #2 Mosler pits with 8 laps on the Paragon car, the engine cover coming off and the last scheduled brake pad change of the race and quickly leaves the pitlane, assisted, still 3 laps ahead of the #39 Porsche.

Hour 23

It is not long until Haynes passes re-passes the Chad Porsche as the car makes its final pit stop. Just as the Chad car pits, the Safety Car comes out because of debris at Brooklands, meaning the Porsche cannot leave the pits until the rest of the field passes the pit exit, also held is the #20 911virgin.com Porsche. Once racing gets back underway, the #32 BMW is back in the pits for a quick splash of fuel and immediately heads back out, then comes in the #1 BMW, with Werner handing the car over to Jamie Campbell-Walter for the remaining time of the race. The leading Class 4 car, the #79 TH Motorsport Volkswagen Golf pits for a refuel, Mark Sumpter stepping into the #39 Paragon Porsche, Marcel Fässler pushing the BMW to its limit, trying to catch him. With only 75 minutes left, the leading Class 3 Honda Integra Type-R of Team Thrush hits electrical problems and only leading the #67 Pete Daniels Motorsport Honda by 6 laps. The #45 BMW is hit with a stop-go penalty for speeding in the pit lane, not affecting its position. In trying to quickly get out of the pit lane, Fässler picked up a penalty for speeding in the pit lane, making it even more problematic to catch up to and pass Sumpter. The Eclipse Mosler MT900R pits for a final splash of fuel to make it home ahead of the #15 car of Nigel Greensall in the battle for third GT3.

Hour 24

The #67 Honda takes the Class 3 lead from Team Thrush as they frantically try to fix the car to make the finish. Greensall, in an effort to catch the Mosler, sets the fastest lap but in doing so picks up two separate punctures. The drops him out of any contention for third in GT3 and into the clutches of the charging #26 GTS BMW. The Chad Motorsport team struggle to remove a wheel during the pit stop, causing them to drop behind GTS Motorsport, 911virgin.com Porsche and TJH Motorsport Honda, falling to 9th place. After a tedious repair job, which lost them the Class 3 lead, Team Thrush are finally able to send their functional Honda Integra Type-R, rejoining in Class 3. With half an hour to go, Campbell-Walter brings in the BMW, 29 laps clear of the next car, the win already in their hands. Chad Motorsport still struggle with their #15 car as the 964 Porsche takes 9th place. The Saxon Motorsport team hit trouble during their battle with Team Top Gear, relieving. Finally, the Chad Motorsport Porsche 997 GT3 Cup leaves the pit lane just as the Apex Motorsport Jaguar does after a pit stop longer than usual. Jamie Campbell-Walter takes a relatively easy second consecutive win for the Duller Motorsport team. The Rollcentre Mosler takes 2nd place, having maintained its 3 lap advantage on the Paragon Porsche which ends up in a very good 3rd place overall, and the GTC class win, in a 2002 Carrera Cup car. All three Moslers, as well as the Chad Porsche, cross the line in unison. After a hard second half of the race, the #32 Duller Motorsport BMW M3 GTR takes fourth ahead of the Eclipse Mosler. GTS Motorsport, after some highs and lows, end the race in 6th position and third in GTC ahead of the 911virgin.com crew in their 996 GT3 Cup car. TJH Motorsport take the Class 2 win in 8th overall after a relatively calm race with Simply Racing's Porsche 964 taking a well-earned Class 1 victory in such a vintage car. The Chad Motorsport team just manage to claim 10th ahead of Colin White's CWS Racing BMW M3 E46, which is second in Class 1. TH Motorsport's race was free of any trouble, a quiet race for the Volkswagen Golf Diesel. After being practically gifted the Class 3 by Team Thrush's troubles, Pete Daniels Motorsport take the Class 3 win, with both cars crossing the line next to each other. Meanwhile, in third in Class 4, the Team Top Gear BMW 330d of Jeremy Clarkson practically begging the car to make the finish. He eventually crossed the line 39th overall, 3rd in class, a notable achievement for an inexperienced group of drivers, bar The Stig (Ben Collins) who had raced in the 24 Hours of Le Mans prior, having huge accident damage, among other setbacks, to come home with a class podium in the Top Gear trio's first ever 24-hour race. Out of the 60 starters, 46 were classified at the end of the race, the last car being 286 laps behind the winner, being the #72 OJP Sport Racing Honda Civic.

=== Results ===
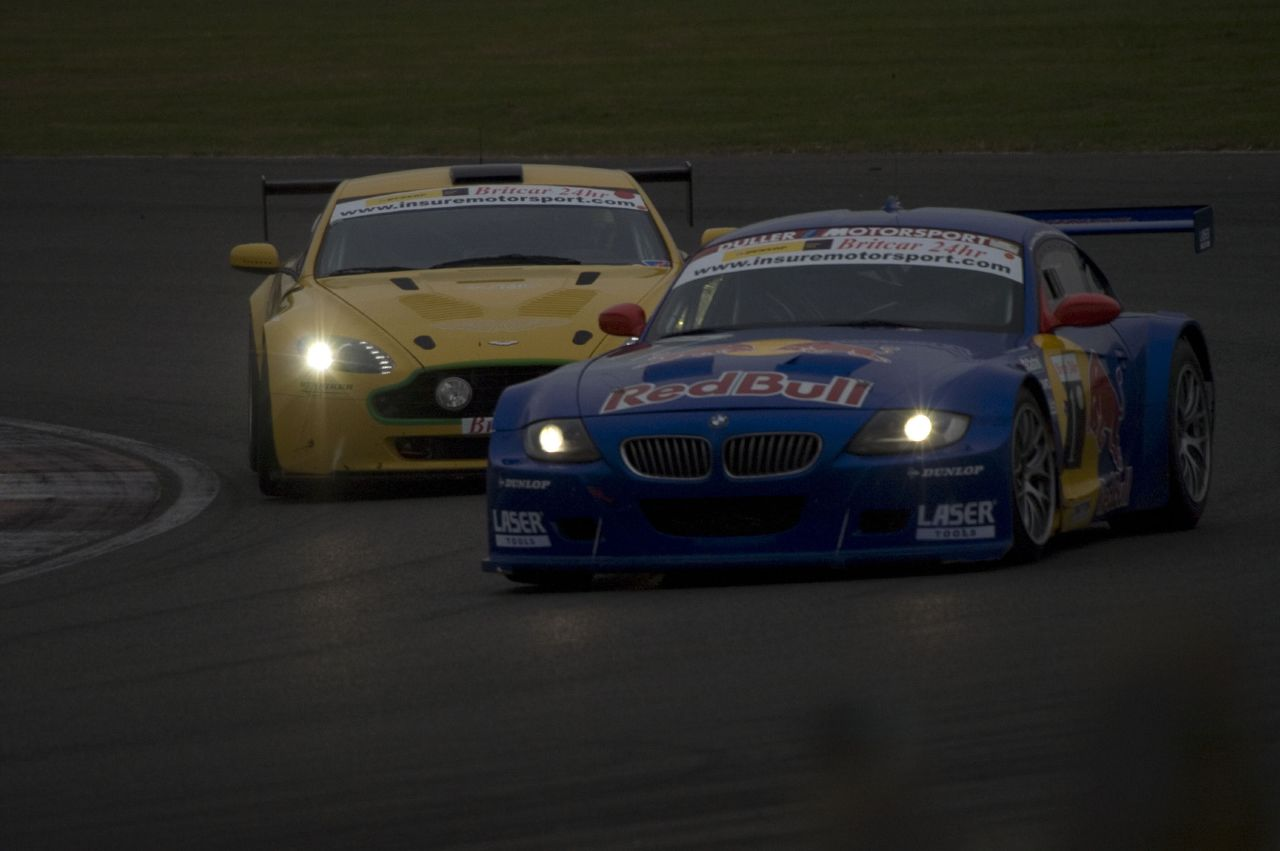
Jamie Campbell-Walter, Dieter Quester, Johannes Stuck and Dirk Werner in the Duller Motorsport BMW Z4 M Coupé, giving the Austrian team their second consecutive Britcar 24 Hour win.

Class winners are in bold.

Pos	Class	No.	Team	Drivers	Chassis	Laps	Time/Reason
Pos	Class	No.	Team	Drivers	Engine	Laps	Time/Reason
1	**GT3**	**1**	**(Austria) Duller Motorsport**	**(United Kingdom) Jamie Campbell-Walter (Austria) Dieter Quester (Austria) Johannes Stuck (Germany) Dirk Werner**	**BMW Z4 M Coupé**	**596**	**24:01:46.384**
1	**GT3**	**1**	**(Austria) Duller Motorsport**	**(United Kingdom) Jamie Campbell-Walter (Austria) Dieter Quester (Austria) Johannes Stuck (Germany) Dirk Werner**	**BMW 3.2 L I4**	**596**	**24:01:46.384**
2	GT3	2	(United Kingdom) Rollcentre Racing with Deutsche Bank	(United Kingdom) Stuart Hall (United Kingdom) Andy Neate (United Kingdom) Martin Short	Mosler MT900R GT3	567	+29 Laps
2	GT3	2	(United Kingdom) Rollcentre Racing with Deutsche Bank	(United Kingdom) Stuart Hall (United Kingdom) Andy Neate (United Kingdom) Martin Short	Chevrolet LS1 5.7 L V8	567	+29 Laps
3	**GTC**	**39**	**(United Kingdom) Paragon Motorsport**	**(United Kingdom) Chris Harris (United Kingdom) Andrew Purdie (United Kingdom) Adrian Slater (United Kingdom) Mark Sumpter**	**Porsche 996 GT3 Cup**	**564**	**+32 Laps**
3	**GTC**	**39**	**(United Kingdom) Paragon Motorsport**	**(United Kingdom) Chris Harris (United Kingdom) Andrew Purdie (United Kingdom) Adrian Slater (United Kingdom) Mark Sumpter**	**Porsche 3.6 L Flat-6**	**564**	**+32 Laps**
4	GTC	32	(Austria) Duller Motorsport	(Italy) Luca Cappellari (Switzerland) Marcel Fässler (Switzerland) Gabriele Gardel (Italy) Fabrizio Gollin	BMW M3 E46 GTR	562	+34 Laps
4	GTC	32	(Austria) Duller Motorsport	(Italy) Luca Cappellari (Switzerland) Marcel Fässler (Switzerland) Gabriele Gardel (Italy) Fabrizio Gollin	BMW 4.0 L V8	562	+34 Laps
5	GT3	8	(United Kingdom) Eclipse Motorsport	(United Kingdom) Del Delaronde (United Kingdom) George Haynes (United Kingdom) Martin Rich (United Kingdom) Adam Sharpe	Mosler MT900R GT3	558	+38 Laps
5	GT3	8	(United Kingdom) Eclipse Motorsport	(United Kingdom) Del Delaronde (United Kingdom) George Haynes (United Kingdom) Martin Rich (United Kingdom) Adam Sharpe	Chevrolet LS1 5.7 L V8	558	+38 Laps
6	GTC	26	(United Kingdom) GTS Motorsport	(United Kingdom) David Leslie (United Kingdom) Joe Macari (United Kingdom) Rob Wilson (United Kingdom) Stuart Wright	BMW M3 E46 GTR	553	+43 Laps
6	GTC	26	(United Kingdom) GTS Motorsport	(United Kingdom) David Leslie (United Kingdom) Joe Macari (United Kingdom) Rob Wilson (United Kingdom) Stuart Wright	BMW 3.2 L I6	553	+43 Laps
7	GTC	20	(United Kingdom) 911virgin.com	(United Kingdom) Henry Firman (United Kingdom) Peter Morris (United Kingdom) Steve Rance (United Kingdom) Craig Wilkins	Porsche 996 GT3 Cup	552	+44 Laps
7	GTC	20	(United Kingdom) 911virgin.com	(United Kingdom) Henry Firman (United Kingdom) Peter Morris (United Kingdom) Steve Rance (United Kingdom) Craig Wilkins	Porsche 3.6 L Flat-6	552	+44 Laps
8	**2**	**65**	**(United Kingdom) TJH Motorsport**	**(United Kingdom) Paul Collis (United Kingdom) Simon Mason (United Kingdom) Jonathan Ridley-Holloway (United Kingdom) Paul Taft**	**Honda Civic Type R**	**549**	**+47 Laps**
8	**2**	**65**	**(United Kingdom) TJH Motorsport**	**(United Kingdom) Paul Collis (United Kingdom) Simon Mason (United Kingdom) Jonathan Ridley-Holloway (United Kingdom) Paul Taft**	**Honda 2.0 L K20A I4**	**549**	**+47 Laps**
9	**1**	**54**	**(United Kingdom) Simply Racing**	**(United Kingdom) James Brodie (United Kingdom) Andreas Demetriou (United Kingdom) Gregor Fisken (United Kingdom) Piers Masarati**	**Porsche 964 RS**	**543**	**+53 Laps**
9	**1**	**54**	**(United Kingdom) Simply Racing**	**(United Kingdom) James Brodie (United Kingdom) Andreas Demetriou (United Kingdom) Gregor Fisken (United Kingdom) Piers Masarati**	**Porsche 3.3 L Flat-6**	**543**	**+53 Laps**
10	GT3	15	(United Kingdom) Chad Motorsport	(United Kingdom) Iain Dockerill (United Kingdom) Nigel Greensall (Denmark) Bo McCormick	Porsche 997 GT3 Cup	539	+57 Laps
10	GT3	15	(United Kingdom) Chad Motorsport	(United Kingdom) Iain Dockerill (United Kingdom) Nigel Greensall (Denmark) Bo McCormick	Porsche 3.6 L Flat-6	539	+57 Laps
11	1	45	(United Kingdom) CWS Racing	(Germany) Frank Nohring (United Kingdom) Matthew Truelove (United Kingdom) Colin White	BMW M3 E46 CSL	538	+58 Laps
11	1	45	(United Kingdom) CWS Racing	(Germany) Frank Nohring (United Kingdom) Matthew Truelove (United Kingdom) Colin White	BMW 3.2 L I6	538	+58 Laps
12	2	62	(United Kingdom) ELR	(United Kingdom) Dave Allan (United States) Mark Hein (United Kingdom) Peter Venn	Honda Civic Type R	524	+72 Laps
12	2	62	(United Kingdom) ELR	(United Kingdom) Dave Allan (United States) Mark Hein (United Kingdom) Peter Venn	Honda 2.0 L K20A I4	524	+72 Laps
13	**4**	**79**	**(United Kingdom) TH Motorsport**	**(United Kingdom) John George (United Kingdom) Ken Lark (United Kingdom) Tim Saunders (United Kingdom) Nick Starkey**	**Volkswagen Golf Diesel**	**519**	**+77 Laps**
13	**4**	**79**	**(United Kingdom) TH Motorsport**	**(United Kingdom) John George (United Kingdom) Ken Lark (United Kingdom) Tim Saunders (United Kingdom) Nick Starkey**	**Volkswagen 1.9 L I4**	**519**	**+77 Laps**
14	4	77	(Netherlands) Marcos Racing International	(United Kingdom) Rupert Douglas-Pennant (United Kingdom) Tony Rodriguez (United Kingdom) Mark Smith	BMW 120d	509	+87 Laps
14	4	77	(Netherlands) Marcos Racing International	(United Kingdom) Rupert Douglas-Pennant (United Kingdom) Tony Rodriguez (United Kingdom) Mark Smith	BMW 2.0 L I4	509	+87 Laps
15	1	57	(United Kingdom) RJN Motorsport	(United Kingdom) John Backer (United Kingdom) Jethro Bovindon (United Kingdom) Michael Mallock (United Kingdom) Richard Meaden	Nissan 350Z	506	+90 Laps
15	1	57	(United Kingdom) RJN Motorsport	(United Kingdom) John Backer (United Kingdom) Jethro Bovindon (United Kingdom) Michael Mallock (United Kingdom) Richard Meaden	Nissan VQ35HR 3.5 L V6	506	+90 Laps
16	GTC	31	(United Kingdom) ISL Motorsport	(United Kingdom) Charles Bateman (United Kingdom) Alun Edwards (United Kingdom) Robin Jones	Marcos Mantis	505	+91 Laps
16	GTC	31	(United Kingdom) ISL Motorsport	(United Kingdom) Charles Bateman (United Kingdom) Alun Edwards (United Kingdom) Robin Jones	Ford 5.0 L V8	505	+91 Laps
17	GTC	28	(United Kingdom) Richard Thorne Motorsport	(United Kingdom) Glyn Davis (United Kingdom) Tom Jones (United Kingdom) Russell Paterson (United Kingdom) Tom Shrimpton	Morgan Aero 8	505	+91 Laps
17	GTC	28	(United Kingdom) Richard Thorne Motorsport	(United Kingdom) Glyn Davis (United Kingdom) Tom Jones (United Kingdom) Russell Paterson (United Kingdom) Tom Shrimpton	BMW N62 4.8 L V8	505	+91 Laps
18	2	70	(United Kingdom) County EMC Team	(United Kingdom) Art Atwal (United Kingdom) Peter Erceg (United Kingdom) Peter Garrod (United Kingdom) Marc Stanford	Porsche 968	504	+92 Laps
18	2	70	(United Kingdom) County EMC Team	(United Kingdom) Art Atwal (United Kingdom) Peter Erceg (United Kingdom) Peter Garrod (United Kingdom) Marc Stanford	Porsche 3.0 L I4	504	+92 Laps
19	2	71	(United Kingdom) County EMC Team	(United Kingdom) Lali Atwal (United Kingdom) Ceiron Brewer (United Kingdom) Frank Cortes (United Kingdom) Alex Eacock	Porsche 968	503	+93 Laps
19	2	71	(United Kingdom) County EMC Team	(United Kingdom) Lali Atwal (United Kingdom) Ceiron Brewer (United Kingdom) Frank Cortes (United Kingdom) Alex Eacock	Porsche 3.0 L I4	503	+93 Laps
20	**3**	**67**	**(United Kingdom) Pete Daniels Motorsport**	**(United Kingdom) David Abbott (United Kingdom) Jamie Ackers (United Kingdom) Malcolm Edeson (United Kingdom) Michael Hartley (United Kingdom) David Nye**	**Honda Civic Type R**	**500**	**+96 Laps**
20	**3**	**67**	**(United Kingdom) Pete Daniels Motorsport**	**(United Kingdom) David Abbott (United Kingdom) Jamie Ackers (United Kingdom) Malcolm Edeson (United Kingdom) Michael Hartley (United Kingdom) David Nye**	**Honda 2.0 L K20A I4**	**500**	**+96 Laps**
21	3	73	(United Kingdom) Team Thrush	(United Kingdom) Ian Bankhurst (United Kingdom) Richard Ince (United Kingdom) Nick Padmore (United Kingdom) Austin Reynolds	Honda Integra Type-R (DC2)	494	+102 Laps
21	3	73	(United Kingdom) Team Thrush	(United Kingdom) Ian Bankhurst (United Kingdom) Richard Ince (United Kingdom) Nick Padmore (United Kingdom) Austin Reynolds	Honda 1.8 L K20A2 I4	494	+102 Laps
22	GTC	30	(Denmark) Buddha Motorsport	(Denmark) Jan Kalmar (United Kingdom) Chris Porritt (Denmark) Henrik Moller Sørensen (Denmark) Jacob Tackman-Thomson	Aston Martin Vantage N24	491	+105 Laps
22	GTC	30	(Denmark) Buddha Motorsport	(Denmark) Jan Kalmar (United Kingdom) Chris Porritt (Denmark) Henrik Moller Sørensen (Denmark) Jacob Tackman-Thomson	Aston Martin 4.3 L V8	491	+105 Laps
23	GTC	40	(United Kingdom) RJN Motorsport	(United Kingdom) Alex Buncombe (United Kingdom) Owen Mildenhall (United Kingdom) Anthony Reid (Denmark) Kurt Thiim	Nissan 350Z	481	+115 Laps
23	GTC	40	(United Kingdom) RJN Motorsport	(United Kingdom) Alex Buncombe (United Kingdom) Owen Mildenhall (United Kingdom) Anthony Reid (Denmark) Kurt Thiim	Nissan VQ35HR 3.5 L V6	481	+115 Laps
24	2	76	(United Kingdom) Mardi Gras Motorsport	(United Kingdom) Stephen Day (United Kingdom) Richard Meins (United Kingdom) Desmond Smail	Honda Integra Type-R (DC5)	475	+121 Laps
24	2	76	(United Kingdom) Mardi Gras Motorsport	(United Kingdom) Stephen Day (United Kingdom) Richard Meins (United Kingdom) Desmond Smail	Honda 2.0 L K20A I4	475	+121 Laps
25	1	43	(United Kingdom) Geoff Steel Racing	(United Kingdom) Steve Bell (United Kingdom) Gareth Howell (United Kingdom) Simon Leith (United Kingdom) Michael Symons	BMW M3 E36	470	+126 Laps
25	1	43	(United Kingdom) Geoff Steel Racing	(United Kingdom) Steve Bell (United Kingdom) Gareth Howell (United Kingdom) Simon Leith (United Kingdom) Michael Symons	BMW 3.0 L I6	470	+126 Laps
26	GTC	27	(Netherlands) Marcos Racing International	(Spain) José Luis Bermúdez de Castro (Netherlands) Jan de Wit (Netherlands) Cor Euser	Marcos Mantis	467	+129 Laps
26	GTC	27	(Netherlands) Marcos Racing International	(Spain) José Luis Bermúdez de Castro (Netherlands) Jan de Wit (Netherlands) Cor Euser	Chevrolet 5.9 L V8	467	+129 Laps
27	GT3	10	(United Kingdom) Chad Motorsport	(United Kingdom) Michael McInerney (United Kingdom) Sean McInerney (Netherlands) Michael Vergers	Mosler MT900R GT3	464	+132 Laps
27	GT3	10	(United Kingdom) Chad Motorsport	(United Kingdom) Michael McInerney (United Kingdom) Sean McInerney (Netherlands) Michael Vergers	Chevrolet LS1 5.7 L V8	464	+132 Laps
28	GTC	24	(United Kingdom) Topcats Racing	(United Kingdom) Jon Harrison (United Kingdom) Dominic Lesniewski (France) Luc Paillard (United Kingdom) Gerry Taylor	Marcos Mantis	461	+135 Laps
28	GTC	24	(United Kingdom) Topcats Racing	(United Kingdom) Jon Harrison (United Kingdom) Dominic Lesniewski (France) Luc Paillard (United Kingdom) Gerry Taylor	Ford 5.0 L V8	461	+135 Laps
29	3	75	(United Kingdom) Intecnly Racing	(United Kingdom) Darren Anley (United Kingdom) Paul Armitage (United Kingdom) David Joseph (United Kingdom) Ian Kilpatrick	Honda Integra Type-R (DC2)	461	+135 Laps
29	3	75	(United Kingdom) Intecnly Racing	(United Kingdom) Darren Anley (United Kingdom) Paul Armitage (United Kingdom) David Joseph (United Kingdom) Ian Kilpatrick	Honda 1.8 L K20A2 I4	461	+135 Laps
30	1	51	(United Kingdom) Simmons Printers	(United Kingdom) David Back (United Kingdom) Robert Day (United Kingdom) Paul Phipps (United Kingdom) Stephen Shanly	BMW M3 E36	446	+150 Laps
30	1	51	(United Kingdom) Simmons Printers	(United Kingdom) David Back (United Kingdom) Robert Day (United Kingdom) Paul Phipps (United Kingdom) Stephen Shanly	BMW 3.0 L I6	446	+150 Laps
31	1	41	(United Kingdom) Team Scandal	(United Kingdom) Martin Dower (United Kingdom) Scott Fitzgerald (United Kingdom) Chris Randall (United Kingdom) Simon Scuffham	Lotus Exige	442	+154 Laps
31	1	41	(United Kingdom) Team Scandal	(United Kingdom) Martin Dower (United Kingdom) Scott Fitzgerald (United Kingdom) Chris Randall (United Kingdom) Simon Scuffham	Rover 1.8 L K-series I4	442	+154 Laps
32	GTC	22	(United Kingdom) EDM Motorsport	(United Kingdom) Peter Hardman (United Kingdom) Nick Leventis (United Kingdom) Christian Vann	BMW M3 E46 GTR	435	+161 Laps
32	GTC	22	(United Kingdom) EDM Motorsport	(United Kingdom) Peter Hardman (United Kingdom) Nick Leventis (United Kingdom) Christian Vann	BMW 4.0 L V8	435	+161 Laps
33	1	58	(United Kingdom) Moore Racing	(United Kingdom) Will Curtis (United Kingdom) Paul Fenton (United Kingdom) Mike Gardiner (United Kingdom) Sarah Reader	BMW M3 E36	435	+161 Laps
33	1	58	(United Kingdom) Moore Racing	(United Kingdom) Will Curtis (United Kingdom) Paul Fenton (United Kingdom) Mike Gardiner (United Kingdom) Sarah Reader	BMW 3.0 L I6	435	+161 Laps
34	GT3	4	(United Kingdom) Apex Motorsport	(United Kingdom) Michael Neuhoff (United Kingdom) Chris Ryan (United Kingdom) Stuart Scott	Jaguar XKR GT3	432	+164 Laps
34	GT3	4	(United Kingdom) Apex Motorsport	(United Kingdom) Michael Neuhoff (United Kingdom) Chris Ryan (United Kingdom) Stuart Scott	Jaguar 4.2 L V8	432	+164 Laps
35	GTC	19	(Germany) Tischner Motorsport	(Germany) Ulrich Becker (Germany) Marco Schelp (Germany) Matthias Tischner (Germany) Michael Tischner	BMW M3 E46 CSL	421	+175 Laps
35	GTC	19	(Germany) Tischner Motorsport	(Germany) Ulrich Becker (Germany) Marco Schelp (Germany) Matthias Tischner (Germany) Michael Tischner	BMW 3.2 L I6	421	+175 Laps
36	GT3	12	(United Kingdom) Chesterton Commercial Holdings	(United Kingdom) Grahame Bryant (United Kingdom) Oliver Bryant (United Kingdom) Howard Spooner	Marcos Mantis GT3	420	+176 Laps
36	GT3	12	(United Kingdom) Chesterton Commercial Holdings	(United Kingdom) Grahame Bryant (United Kingdom) Oliver Bryant (United Kingdom) Howard Spooner	Chevrolet 5.9 L V8	420	+176 Laps
37	GTC	36	(United Kingdom) Jemco Racing	(United Kingdom) Kevin Hancock (United Kingdom) Nigel Rata (United Kingdom) Nick Reynolds (United Kingdom) Leigh Smart	Marcos Mantis	404	+192 Laps
37	GTC	36	(United Kingdom) Jemco Racing	(United Kingdom) Kevin Hancock (United Kingdom) Nigel Rata (United Kingdom) Nick Reynolds (United Kingdom) Leigh Smart	Ford 5.0 L V8	404	+192 Laps
38	3	68	(United Kingdom) Pete Daniels Motorsport	(United Kingdom) Peter Daniels (United Kingdom) Malcolm Edeson (United Kingdom) Michael Hartley (United Kingdom) Fiona Leggate	Honda Civic Type R	400	+196 Laps
38	3	68	(United Kingdom) Pete Daniels Motorsport	(United Kingdom) Peter Daniels (United Kingdom) Malcolm Edeson (United Kingdom) Michael Hartley (United Kingdom) Fiona Leggate	Honda 2.0 L K20A I4	400	+196 Laps
39	4	78	(United Kingdom) Team Top Gear	(United Kingdom) Jeremy Clarkson (United Kingdom) "The Stig" (United Kingdom) James May (United Kingdom) Richard Hammond	BMW 330d	396	+200 Laps
39	4	78	(United Kingdom) Team Top Gear	(United Kingdom) Jeremy Clarkson (United Kingdom) "The Stig" (United Kingdom) James May (United Kingdom) Richard Hammond	BMW 3.0 L I6	396	+200 Laps
40	1	55	(United Kingdom) Torquespeed Motorsport	(United Kingdom) Rob Barff (United Kingdom) Phil Cutts (United Kingdom) Dominic Jackson (United Kingdom) Steve Warburton	BMW M3 E36	393	+203 Laps
40	1	55	(United Kingdom) Torquespeed Motorsport	(United Kingdom) Rob Barff (United Kingdom) Phil Cutts (United Kingdom) Dominic Jackson (United Kingdom) Steve Warburton	BMW 3.0 L I6	393	+203 Laps
41	3	74	(United Kingdom) DC Motorsport	(United Kingdom) Doug Cole (Sweden) Mats Wahlgren (United Kingdom) Robin Walker	MG ZR 190	377	+219 Laps
41	3	74	(United Kingdom) DC Motorsport	(United Kingdom) Doug Cole (Sweden) Mats Wahlgren (United Kingdom) Robin Walker	MG 1.8 L K-Series I4	377	+219 Laps
42	4	80	(United Kingdom) Saxon Motorsport	(United Kingdom) Clint Bardwell (United Kingdom) Nick Barrow (United Kingdom) Richard Corbett (United Kingdom) David Mountain	BMW 330d	360	+236 Laps
42	4	80	(United Kingdom) Saxon Motorsport	(United Kingdom) Clint Bardwell (United Kingdom) Nick Barrow (United Kingdom) Richard Corbett (United Kingdom) David Mountain	BMW 3.0 L I6	360	+236 Laps
43	2	63	(United Kingdom) Moore Racing	(United Kingdom) Jonathan Berney (United Kingdom) Gary Coulson (Germany) Hubert Hinklehoffer (United Kingdom) Miles Hulford	Honda Civic Type R	340	+256 Laps
43	2	63	(United Kingdom) Moore Racing	(United Kingdom) Jonathan Berney (United Kingdom) Gary Coulson (Germany) Hubert Hinklehoffer (United Kingdom) Miles Hulford	Honda 2.0 L K20A I4	340	+256 Laps
44	GTC	34	(United Kingdom) Moore International Motorsport	(United Kingdom) Ryan Hooker (United Kingdom) Willie Moore (United Kingdom) Peter Seldon (United Kingdom) Paul White	BMW M3 E36 GTR	325	+271 Laps
44	GTC	34	(United Kingdom) Moore International Motorsport	(United Kingdom) Ryan Hooker (United Kingdom) Willie Moore (United Kingdom) Peter Seldon (United Kingdom) Paul White	BMW 3.0 L I6	325	+271 Laps
45	GTC	35	(United Kingdom) CTR Alfatune	(United Kingdom) Phil Brough (United Kingdom) John Clonis (United Kingdom) Malcolm MacAdam (United Kingdom) Paul White	Porsche 993 RSR	312	+284 Laps
45	GTC	35	(United Kingdom) CTR Alfatune	(United Kingdom) Phil Brough (United Kingdom) John Clonis (United Kingdom) Malcolm MacAdam (United Kingdom) Paul White	Porsche 3.6 L Flat-6	312	+284 Laps
46	3	72	(United Kingdom) OJP Sport Racing	(United Kingdom) Chris Davies (United Kingdom) Michael Nippers (United Kingdom) Mat Perkins (United Kingdom) Steve Griffiths	Honda Civic	310	+286 Laps
46	3	72	(United Kingdom) OJP Sport Racing	(United Kingdom) Chris Davies (United Kingdom) Michael Nippers (United Kingdom) Mat Perkins (United Kingdom) Steve Griffiths	Honda 2.0 L K20A2 I4	310	+286 Laps
DNF	GT3	3	(United Kingdom) Team Solutions	(United Kingdom) Neil Clark (United Kingdom) Peter Hobday (United Kingdom) Ian Stinton	ProSport LM3000	284	Retired
DNF	GT3	3	(United Kingdom) Team Solutions	(United Kingdom) Neil Clark (United Kingdom) Peter Hobday (United Kingdom) Ian Stinton	Ford Cosworth 3.0 L V6	284	Retired
DNF	GTC	11	(Germany) Topper Team	(United Kingdom) Graham Coombes (Netherlands) Dirk Schulz (Netherlands) Jan Marc Schulz (Netherlands) Jan Willems	Porsche 996 GT3 Cup	224	Retired
DNF	GTC	11	(Germany) Topper Team	(United Kingdom) Graham Coombes (Netherlands) Dirk Schulz (Netherlands) Jan Marc Schulz (Netherlands) Jan Willems	Porsche 3.6 L Flat-6	224	Retired
DNF	GTC	29	(Italy) Racing Box SRL	(Italy) Marco Cioci (Italy) Roberto del Castello (Italy) Giuseppe Perazzini	BMW M3 E46 GTR	208	Retired
DNF	GTC	29	(Italy) Racing Box SRL	(Italy) Marco Cioci (Italy) Roberto del Castello (Italy) Giuseppe Perazzini	BMW 4.0 L V8	208	Retired
DNF	1	49	(United Kingdom) GP Motorsport	(United Kingdom) Hamish Irvine (United Kingdom) John Irvine (United Kingdom) Ed Lovett (United Kingdom) Guy Povey	BMW M3 E36 GTR	189	Crash
DNF	1	49	(United Kingdom) GP Motorsport	(United Kingdom) Hamish Irvine (United Kingdom) John Irvine (United Kingdom) Ed Lovett (United Kingdom) Guy Povey	BMW 3.0 L I6	189	Crash
DNF	1	47	(United Kingdom) Duke Video	(United Kingdom) Peter Duke (Australia) Alan Gow (United Kingdom) Adrian Watt (United Kingdom) Chris Wilson	BMW M3 E36 GTR	156	Brakes
DNF	1	47	(United Kingdom) Duke Video	(United Kingdom) Peter Duke (Australia) Alan Gow (United Kingdom) Adrian Watt (United Kingdom) Chris Wilson	BMW 3.0 L I6	156	Brakes
DNF	GT3	6	(United Kingdom) KTF Group	(United Kingdom) Phil Bennett (United Kingdom) Mark Dwyer (United Kingdom) Ken Finneran (United Kingdom) Robert Huff	Chrysler Viper GTS-R	142	Prop shaft
DNF	GT3	6	(United Kingdom) KTF Group	(United Kingdom) Phil Bennett (United Kingdom) Mark Dwyer (United Kingdom) Ken Finneran (United Kingdom) Robert Huff	Chrysler 356-T6 8.0 L V10	142	Prop shaft
DNF	2	69	(United Kingdom) Shawn Taylor Racing	(United Kingdom) Tom Ballentyne (United Kingdom) Stuart Brooks (United Kingdom) Andrew Radford (United Kingdom) Shawn Taylor	Nissan 350Z	84	Retired
DNF	2	69	(United Kingdom) Shawn Taylor Racing	(United Kingdom) Tom Ballentyne (United Kingdom) Stuart Brooks (United Kingdom) Andrew Radford (United Kingdom) Shawn Taylor	Nissan VQ35HR 3.5 L V6	84	Retired
DNF	4	81	(Italy) Racing Box SRL	(Italy) Riccardo Azzoli (Italy) Alessandro Bonetti (Italy) Riccardo Cinti (Italy) Fernando Geri	BMW 330d	71	Retired
DNF	4	81	(Italy) Racing Box SRL	(Italy) Riccardo Azzoli (Italy) Alessandro Bonetti (Italy) Riccardo Cinti (Italy) Fernando Geri	BMW 3.0 L I6	71	Retired
DNF	1	52	(United Kingdom) Windrush Motorsport	(United Kingdom) Raun Austin (United Kingdom) Alan Bonner (United Kingdom) Mich Millett (United Kingdom) Adam Wiseberg	BMW M3 E36	30	Engine
DNF	1	52	(United Kingdom) Windrush Motorsport	(United Kingdom) Raun Austin (United Kingdom) Alan Bonner (United Kingdom) Mich Millett (United Kingdom) Adam Wiseberg	BMW 3.0 L I6	30	Engine
DNF	GT3	16	(United Kingdom) Trackpower Motorsport	(United Kingdom) Michael Caine (United Kingdom) Richard Hay (United Kingdom) Richard Stanton (United Kingdom) Stuart Turvey	TVR Sagaris	30	Crash
DNF	GT3	16	(United Kingdom) Trackpower Motorsport	(United Kingdom) Michael Caine (United Kingdom) Richard Hay (United Kingdom) Richard Stanton (United Kingdom) Stuart Turvey	TVR 5.0 L V8	30	Crash
DNF	1	59	(United Kingdom) Phatgixer Racing	(United Kingdom) Phil Bennett (United Kingdom) Angus Dawe (United Kingdom) Michael Richardson (United Kingdom) Jason White	BMW M3 E36	20	Mechanical
DNF	1	59	(United Kingdom) Phatgixer Racing	(United Kingdom) Phil Bennett (United Kingdom) Angus Dawe (United Kingdom) Michael Richardson (United Kingdom) Jason White	BMW 3.0 L I6	20	Mechanical
DNF	1	46	(United Kingdom) Intersport Racing	(United Kingdom) Kevin Clarke (United Kingdom) Andrew Donaldson (United Kingdom) Ian Donaldson (United Kingdom) Mark Donaldson	BMW M3 E46 CSL	13	Retired
DNF	1	46	(United Kingdom) Intersport Racing	(United Kingdom) Kevin Clarke (United Kingdom) Andrew Donaldson (United Kingdom) Ian Donaldson (United Kingdom) Mark Donaldson	BMW 3.2 L I6	13	Retired
DNF	1	42	(Germany) www.red-motorsport.de	(Germany) Jerome Bruhat (United Kingdom) Martin Richter (Germany) Martin Roos (Germany) Wilfried Schawohl (Germany) Mirco Schultis	Lotus Exige	7	Retired
DNF	1	42	(Germany) www.red-motorsport.de	(Germany) Jerome Bruhat (United Kingdom) Martin Richter (Germany) Martin Roos (Germany) Wilfried Schawohl (Germany) Mirco Schultis	Rover 1.8 L K-series I4	7	Retired
DNF	GT3	5	(United Kingdom) J & S Accessories	(United Kingdom) Peter Cook (France) Franck Pelle (United Kingdom) Paul Hogarth (United Kingdom) Paul Livesey	Porsche 993 GT2	3	Engine
DNF	GT3	5	(United Kingdom) J & S Accessories	(United Kingdom) Peter Cook (France) Franck Pelle (United Kingdom) Paul Hogarth (United Kingdom) Paul Livesey	Porsche 3.6 L Flat-6	3	Engine
