= Alan J. Gow =

Australian auto racing executive

Alan James Gow (born 23 June 1955) is the Australian chief executive of the British Touring Car Championship (BTCC) and president of the FIA (Fédération Internationale de l'Automobile) Touring Car Commission. He was born in Melbourne, Victoria, Australia, and lives in Surrey, England.

A lifelong entrant and competitor in Australian motorsport, Gow had business interests in Melbourne based car dealerships and commercial property developments. From there, he became involved in the Holden Dealer Team owned by Peter Brock and would become a partner/managing director/team principal, whilst also helping to found TEGA – the Australian Touring Car Entrants Group – the administrators and right-holders of, the V8 Supercar Championship.

He emigrated to England at the end of 1990 and formed TOCA, purchasing the rights to the BTCC in 1991

Gow was also a partner in TOCA Australia – which ran the now defunct Australian Super Touring Championship during the 1990s – as well as in the North American Touring Car Championship, which ran for two years. Both series used regulations similar to those found in the BTCC during the same period.

In 2000, TOCA was sold to the American company Octagon Motorsport (part of the Nasdaq listed Interpublic group) and Gow took a "sabbatical" from managing the BTCC. He retained and licensed the use of the TOCA name for interactive video gaming, and released the TOCA Touring Car series.

In 2003 Octagon relinquished their ownership of TOCA and the BTCC. A new company (BARC TOCA Ltd) was formed to take over management of the championship and Gow was appointed as chief executive

Under Gow's leadership, the BTCC has signed a deal with ITV through 2026.

Gow has held a number of other positions alongside his role at the head of the BTCC, both within the UK and overseas. In 2006, he was appointed as the chairman of the board of the governing body of UK motorsport, the MSA (now known as Motorsport UK) – a position he would hold for three terms before retiring from the role at the end of 2017. Gow was also chairman of International Motorsports Ltd – organisers of the British Grand Prix and Wales Rally GB during the same period, and was a board director of the Royal Automobile Club from 2010 through to 2016.

As well as his role with the FIA's Touring Car Commission, Gow has been a board director and trustee of the FIA Foundation since 2012.

In 2016, at the House of Lords, Gow received the Motorsport Industry Association 'Outstanding Contribution to the Motorsport Industry' award in recognition of the work carried out during his career.

Despite his move to the UK, Gow was the long-time manager of Australian racing driver James Courtney – with the relationship between the pair going back to the late 1990s when Courtney was racing in the British Formula Ford Championship.

Gow holds an FIA race licence and has contested various races through the years, racing everything from BMWs and Mini Coopers to Citroen 2CVs and C1s – the latter in an outing alongside multiple World Touring Car Championship-winning driver Andy Priaulx in a 24-hour race at Rockingham in 2018. Gow also had the chance to get behind the wheel of a BTCC car himself in 2018 when he drove an Alfa Romeo at Snetterton as part of a magazine feature.

Gow has held a pilot's licence since 1979 and also competed in competition water-skiing at International level during the late 1970s and early 1980s.

== Racing record ==
=== Britcar 24 Hour results ===
Year	Team	Co-drivers	Car	Car No.	Class	Laps	Pos.	Class pos.	Ref
2007	(United Kingdom) Duke Video	(United Kingdom) Peter Duke (United Kingdom) Adrian Watt (United Kingdom) Chris Wilson	BMW M3 E36 GTR	47	1	156	DNF	DNF	
