= Guy Povey =

British racing driver (born 1960)

Guy Povey (born 25 May 1960, in Birmingham) is a British auto racing driver. He presently drives a BMW M3 E36 in Production Saloons series for his own Povey Motorsport Team. He has also drove in the Britcar 24 Hour race. His previous racing includes motocross and the Uniroyal production saloon championship. Povey won back to back class titles in the BARC/Firestone prodsaloon championship in 1990 and 1991. He entered one round of the 1992 British Touring Car Championship in a BMW M3 for the Techspeed Racing team. Povey returned to Britcar in 2018 with Dave Cox in a BMW for the 2018 finale at Britcar's infamous 'Into the Night' race.

== Racing record ==
=== Complete British Touring Car Championship results ===
(key) Races in bold indicate pole position (1982-1984 in class) Races in italics indicate fastest lap.

Year	Team	Car	1	2	3	4	5	6	7	8	9	10	11	12	13	14	15	Pos.	Pts
1992	Techspeed Racing	BMW M3	SIL; 18	THR	OUL	SNE	BRH	DON; 1	DON; 2	SIL	KNO; 1	KNO; 2	PEM	BRH; 1	BRH; 2	DON	SIL	33rd	0

=== Complete 24 Hours of Spa results ===
Year	Team	Co-Drivers	Car	Class	Laps	Pos.	Class Pos.
1997	(United Kingdom) Povey Motorsport	(United Kingdom) Dave Cox (Netherlands) Phil Bastiaans	BMW M3 E36	Spa 3.0	80/off course	DNF	DNF

=== Complete 24 Hours of Silverstone results ===
Year	Team	Co-Drivers	Car	Car No.	Class	Laps	Pos.	Class Pos.
2007	(United Kingdom) GP Motorsport	(United Kingdom) Hamish Irvine (United Kingdom) John Irvine (United Kingdom) Ed Lovett	BMW M3 E46	49	1	189	DNF	DNF
2008	(United Kingdom) GP Motorsport	(United Kingdom) Hamish Irvine (United Kingdom) John Irvine (United Kingdom) Clint Bardwell	BMW M3 E46	42	3	548	12th	**2nd**
2012	(United Kingdom) GP Motorsport	(United Kingdom) Nick Whale (United Kingdom) Harry Whale (United Kingdom) Westlie Harding (Sweden) Freddy Nordstrom	BMW M3 E46 GTR	70	3	297	25th/DNF	7th/DNF

=== Complete Britcar results ===
(key) (Races in bold indicate pole position in class – 1 point awarded just in first race; races in italics indicate fastest lap in class – 1 point awarded all races;-

Year	Team	Car	Class	1	2	3	4	5	6	7	8	9	10	11	12	13	14	DC	CP	Points
2018	Povey Motorsport	BMW M3 E46	E4I	ROC; 1	ROC; 2	SIL; 1	SIL; 2	OUL; 1	OUL; 2	DON; 1	DON; 2	SNE; 1	SNE; 2	SIL; 1	SIL; 2	BRH; 1; 12	BRH; 2; 7	NC	NC	0†
