= Andy Neate =

British racing driver (born 1974)

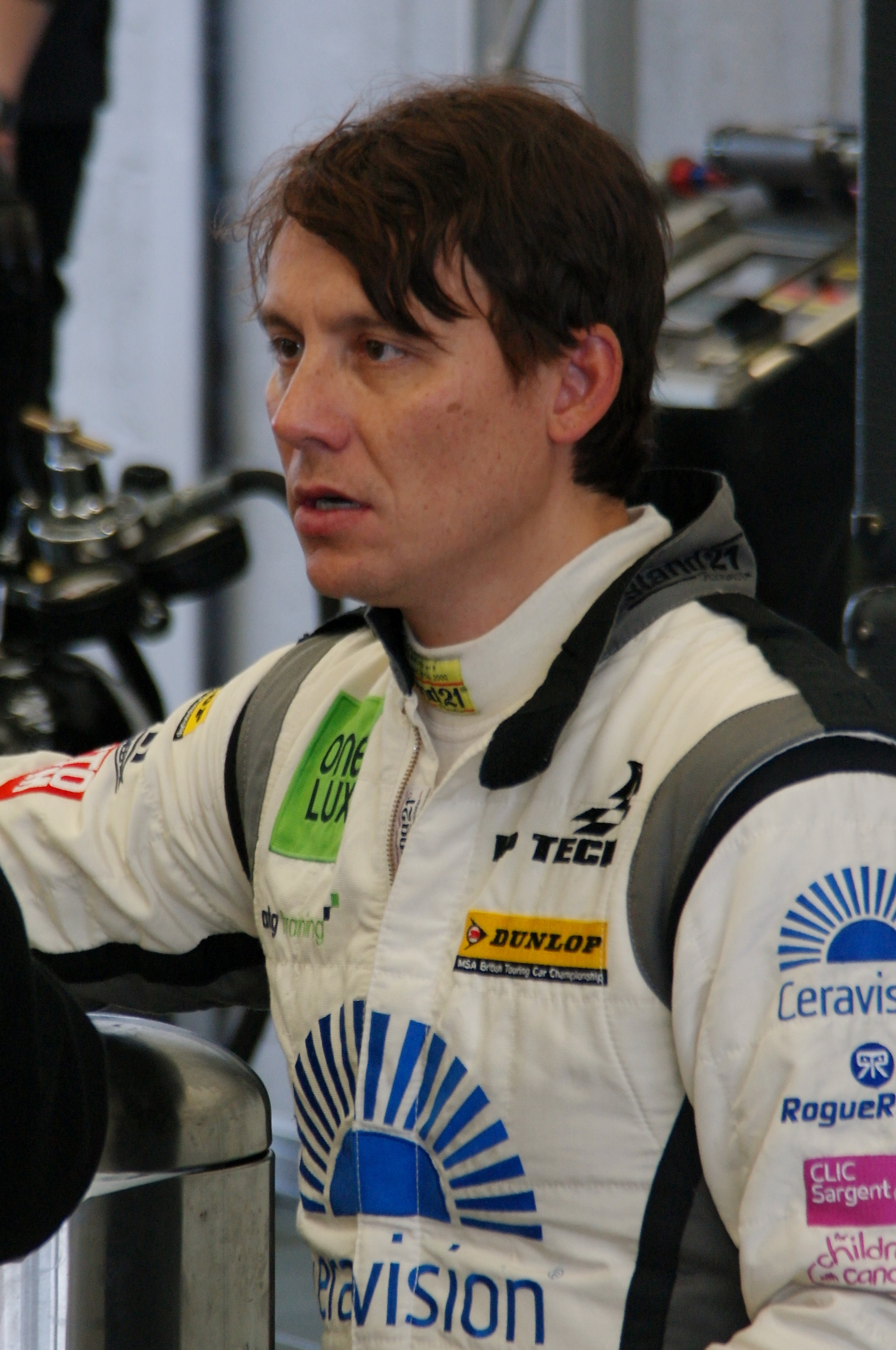
- Neate at the Silverstone round of the 2013 British Touring Car Championship season
- Nationality: (United Kingdom) British
- Born: Andrew Simon Neate; 19 August 1974 (age 52) Aylesbury, England
- Relatives: Aiden Neate (son)

British Touring Car Championship career
- Debut season: 2001
- Categorisation: FIA Bronze
- Car number: 44
- Former teams: Team Club 44; Team Dynamics; MG KX Momentum Racing; Team Aon; West Surrey Racing; Daniels Motorsport; Motorbase Performance
- Starts: 147
- Wins: 0
- Poles: 0
- Fastest laps: 0
- Best finish: 16th in 2012

Previous series
- 2010, 2008 2008 2006 2004 2002 1999 1997: Britcar 24hr Porsche Carrera Cup GB; Ford Fiesta Championship; Renault Clio Cup; British GT Championship; Formula Opel Europa Cup; Formula First

Championship titles
- 2006: Ford Fiesta Zetec

Andrew Simon Neate (born 19 August 1974 in Aylesbury) is a British former racing driver.

== Racing career ==
After first racing in karting, he drove in Formula First in 1997. In 1999, he went on to the Formula Opel Europa Cup and a year later he drove in the Ford Fiesta Championship. He drove in some rounds of the Production class for the BTCC in a Team CAM Mitsubishi Carisma, replacing original intended driver Sandro Proietti prior to the start of the season. For 2002, he moved up to the British GT Championship, driving a Marcos Mantis. In 2004, he joined the TOCA tour with both the Renault Clio Cup and the SEAT Cupra Championship. He got a drive in 2005, in the British Touring Car Championship for Team Nuts with Daniels Motorsport in a former works Vauxhall Astra Coupe. He only drove in the final three rounds at Brands Hatch, finishing eighteenth in the championship with one point and planned to enter the final rounds of the 2006 Season in the same car, only to shelve this plan. In 2006, he won the Ford Fiesta Championship title, and finished first in class at the Britcar 24 Hours in a Honda Civic Type R, as well as driving at Silverstone in the SEAT Cupra Championship. A year later, he raced again in the SEATs, Fiestas and the Britcar 24 in a Mosler GT3 RS where he finished second. He drove in two rounds of the Porsche Carrera Cup Great Britain for Red Line Racing.

=== 2008 accident ===
At the start of the 2008 Britcar 24 Hours at Silverstone, Neate was involved in a serious accident at the start of the race. He suffered terrible injuries including a broken neck from which he spent the next eighteen months recovering. He had missed on a drive with West Surrey Racing in a BMW 320si for the 2008 BTCC Season and was in talks with WSR about driving for them in 2009 prior to the Britcar event, but the deal could not be completed due to his injury.

=== BTCC return ===
After recovering from his injury, Neate completed a deal to drive for WSR in the 2010 British Touring Car Championship season. Neate is the Chief Technology Officer for WSR team sponsors Ceravision. At Oulton Park, he finished ninth, but was disqualified for causing an avoidable accident with Andrew Jordan.

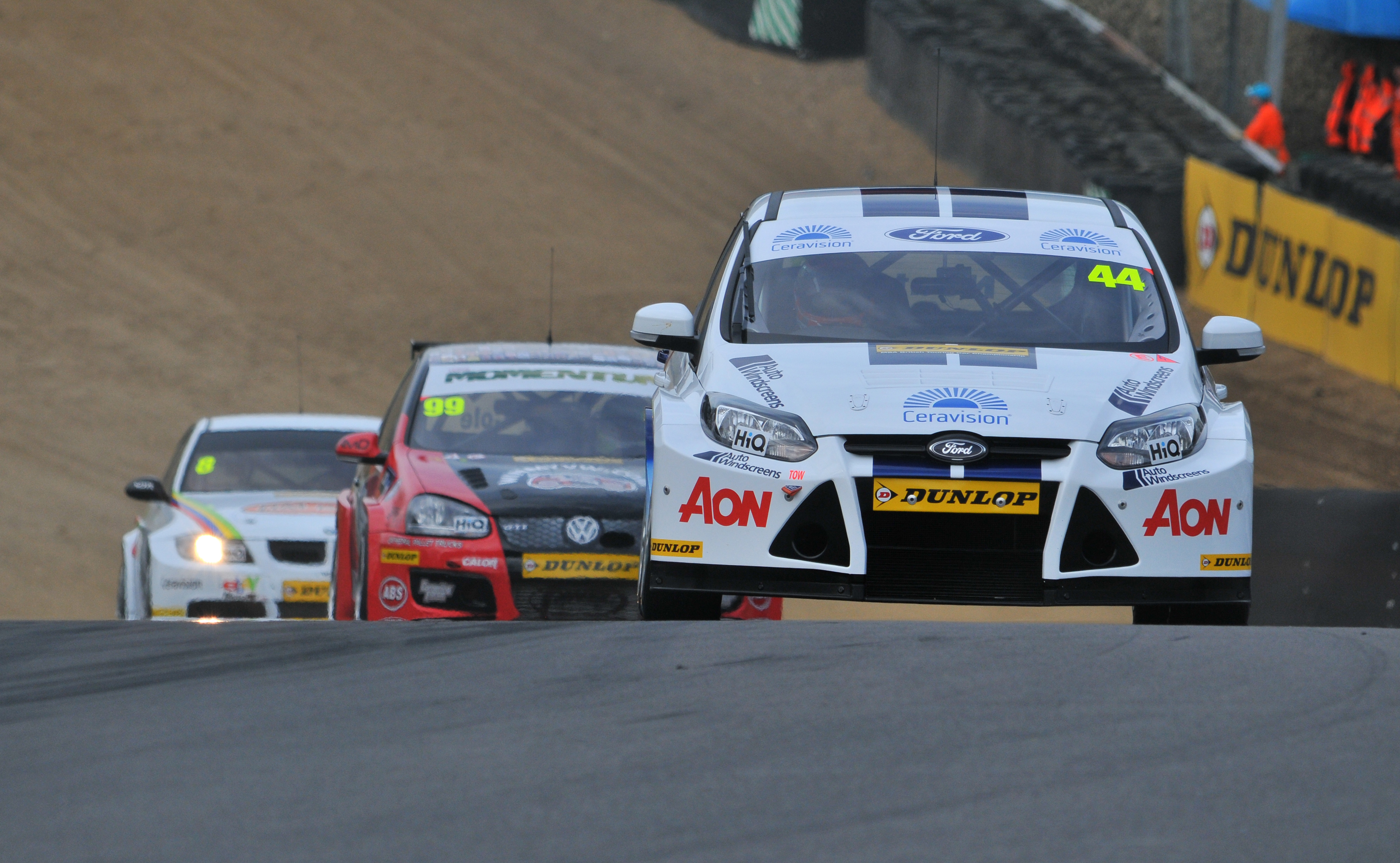
Neate driving the Team Aon Ford Focus ST at Brands Hatch during the 2011 British Touring Car Championship season.

For the 2011 season, Neate switched to Team Aon in the 'Global' Ford Focus, partnering Tom Chilton and Tom Onslow-Cole. 2011 was another difficult year for Neate, he struggled to score points and was involved in many accidents. However, he qualified third at Oulton Park but lost many positions during the first race and only finished ninth, on the last lap he was involved in a major collision with Jeff Smith which resulted in the car of Tom Boardman being written off after he was collected by Smith. At Rockingham, Neate was fined £1,500 for using abusive language towards Alex MacDowall after a dispute over an incident on track. His pace improved during the Brands Hatch meeting, however he lost out on a podium position after losing control of his car.

For the 2012 season, Neate joined the new manufacturer MG team run by Triple Eight Race Engineering alongside Jason Plato. He had another unsuccessful season, finishing sixteenth in the championship whilst his teammate Plato finished third. During the off-season it was confirmed that Neate would not be driving for the MG team in 2013, although he will remain in the championship. On 9 January it was announced that Neate was forming his own team for the 2013 season, and would drive a NGTC-specification Chevrolet Cruze.

The programme wouldn't continue for a second year with the Chevrolet being sold on to Laser Tools Racing for the 2014 season and it would be 2016 before Neate returned to the championship after agreeing a deal to join Team Dynamics in an expanded three-car team. However, Neate would compete in just one meeting before splitting with the team, citing a "lack of full commitment and focus on the job".

Neate rejoined the grid in 2020 with Motorbase Performance in a Ford Focus but endured a tough season that included being excluded from the Thruxton meeting for a clash with Carl Boardley. At the end of the season, Neate re-signed for a second season, hoping that a full pre-season testing programme would provide the chance to fight for improved results on track.

== Personal life ==
Neate has a son, Aiden, who is also a racing driver.

In 2014, Neate was fined £1,000 by the Civil Aviation Authority after illegally landing his helicopter at Oulton Park during CarFest North on August 2, 2014. Neate flew his helicopter over a crowd of 25,000 people and landed without permission, causing a Royal Navy display team to abort their routine. At Chester Magistrates' Court in April 2015, Neate pleaded guilty to landing and taking off within 1,000 meters of a large open-air assembly, and failing to produce his pilot's licence and logbook.

== Racing record ==
=== Complete British Touring Car Championship results ===
(key) Races in bold indicate pole position (1 point awarded – 2001 all races, 2005–present just for first race, 2001 in class) Races in italics indicate fastest lap (1 point awarded all races, 2001 in class) * signifies that driver lead race for at least one lap (1 point awarded all races)

Year	Team	Car	Class	1	2	3	4	5	6	7	8	9	10	11	12	13	14	15	16	17	18	19	20	21	22	23	24	25	26	27	28	29	30	Pos	Pts	Class
2001	Cranfield Automotive Management	Mitsubishi Carisma	P	BRH; 1 Ret†	BRH; 2 Ret	THR; 1	THR; 2	OUL; 1 DNS	OUL; 2 DNS	SIL; 1	SIL; 2	MON; 1	MON; 2	DON; 1	DON; 2	KNO; 1	KNO; 2	SNE; 1	SNE; 2	CRO; 1	CRO; 2	OUL; 1	OUL; 2	SIL; 1	SIL; 2	DON; 1	DON; 2	BRH; 1	BRH; 2					N/A	0	NC
2005	Team Nuts with Daniels Motorsport	Vauxhall Astra Coupé		DON; 1	DON; 2	DON; 3	THR; 1	THR; 2	THR; 3	BRH; 1	BRH; 2	BRH; 3	OUL; 1	OUL; 2	OUL; 3	CRO; 1	CRO; 2	CRO; 3	MON; 1	MON; 2	MON; 3	SNE; 1	SNE; 2	SNE; 3	KNO; 1	KNO; 2	KNO; 3	SIL; 1	SIL; 2	SIL; 3	BRH; 1; 12	BRH; 2; 10	**BRH**; **3**; 11	18th	1	
2010	WSR	BMW 320si		THR; 1; 10	THR; 2; 14	THR; 3; 11	ROC; 1 Ret	ROC; 2; 11	ROC; 3; 9	BRH; 1; 14	BRH; 2 Ret	BRH; 3; 13	OUL; 1; 11	OUL; 2; 17	OUL; 3 DSQ	CRO; 1; 17	CRO; 2; 10	CRO; 3 Ret	SNE; 1; 13	SNE; 2; 13	SNE; 3; 10	SIL; 1; 15	SIL; 2 Ret	SIL; 3; 14	KNO; 1; 12	KNO; 2; 12	KNO; 3; 13	DON; 1; 15	DON; 2; 15	DON; 3 Ret	BRH; 1; 12	BRH; 2; 10	BRH; 3; 12	18th	6	
2011	Team Aon	Ford Focus		BRH; 1; 11	BRH; 2; 12	BRH; 3; 15	DON; 1; 14	DON; 2; 11	DON; 3 Ret	THR; 1; 16	THR; 2; 13	THR; 3; 12	OUL; 1; 9	OUL; 2; 15	OUL; 3; 6	CRO; 1 Ret	CRO; 2; 9	CRO; 3 Ret	SNE; 1; 16	SNE; 2 Ret	SNE; 3 Ret	KNO; 1; 14	KNO; 2; 15	KNO; 3; 13	ROC; 1; 11	ROC; 2 Ret	ROC; 3 DNS	BRH; 1; 9	BRH; 2; 9	BRH; 3 Ret	SIL; 1; 9	SIL; 2; 11	SIL; 3 Ret	18th	15	
2012	MG KX Momentum Racing	MG 6 GT		BRH; 1; 12	BRH; 2; 14	BRH; 3; 14	DON; 1; 16	DON; 2; 12	DON; 3 Ret	THR; 1; 16	THR; 2; 16	THR; 3 Ret	OUL; 1; 7	OUL; 2 Ret	OUL; 3 Ret	CRO; 1; 6	CRO; 2; 9	CRO; 3; 9*	SNE; 1; 15	SNE; 2; 12	SNE; 3; 15	KNO; 1 Ret	KNO; 2; 12	KNO; 3; 15	ROC; 1; 7	ROC; 2 Ret	ROC; 3; 14	SIL; 1; 12	SIL; 2; 18	SIL; 3 Ret	BRH; 1; 13	BRH; 2; 12	BRH; 3 Ret	16th	79	
2013	Team Club 44	Chevrolet Cruze		BRH; 1	BRH; 2	BRH; 3	DON; 1	DON; 2	DON; 3	THR; 1	THR; 2	THR; 3	OUL; 1	OUL; 2	OUL; 3	CRO; 1	CRO; 2	CRO; 3	SNE; 1; 22	SNE; 2; 17	SNE; 3; 16	KNO; 1	KNO; 2	KNO; 3	ROC; 1 Ret	ROC; 2 DNS	ROC; 3 DNS	SIL; 1 Ret	SIL; 2; 17	SIL; 3; 18	BRH; 1	BRH; 2	BRH; 3	34th	0	
2016	Halfords Yuasa Racing	Honda Civic Type R		BRH; 1; 18	BRH; 2; 26	BRH; 3; 26	DON; 1	DON; 2	DON; 3	THR; 1	THR; 2	THR; 3	OUL; 1	OUL; 2	OUL; 3	CRO; 1	CRO; 2	CRO; 3	SNE; 1	SNE; 2	SNE; 3	KNO; 1	KNO; 2	KNO; 3	ROC; 1	ROC; 2	ROC; 3	SIL; 1	SIL; 2	SIL; 3	BRH; 1	BRH; 2	BRH; 3	34th	0	
2020	Motorbase Performance	Ford Focus ST Mk.IV		DON; 1; 20	DON; 2; 18	DON; 3; 19	BRH; 1; 19	BRH; 2; 14	BRH; 3; 18	OUL; 1; 15	OUL; 2; 19	OUL; 3; 20	KNO; 1 Ret	KNO; 2 Ret	KNO; 3; 20	THR; 1 DSQ	THR; 2 DSQ	THR; 3 DSQ	SIL; 1; 21	SIL; 2; 22	SIL; 3 Ret	CRO; 1; 21	CRO; 2; 16	CRO; 3; 16	SNE; 1; 26	SNE; 2; 22	SNE; 3 Ret	BRH; 1; 18	BRH; 2; 21	BRH; 3 Ret				25th	3	
2021	Racing with Wera & Photon Group	Ford Focus ST		THR; 1; 24	THR; 2 Ret	THR; 3 DNS	SNE; 1	SNE; 2	SNE; 3	BRH; 1; 26	BRH; 2; 24	BRH; 3; 25	OUL; 1 WD	OUL; 2 WD	OUL; 3 WD	KNO; 1	KNO; 2	KNO; 3	THR; 1	THR; 2	THR; 3	CRO; 1; 24	CRO; 2; 24	CRO; 3; 18	SIL; 1 Ret	SIL; 2; 23	SIL; 3; 26	DON; 1; 26	DON; 2; 26	DON; 3; 23	BRH; 1 Ret	BRH; 2 Ret	BRH; 3; 22	30th	0	

† Event with 2 races staged for the different classes.

=== Britcar 24 Hour results ===
Year	Team	Co-Drivers	Car	Car No.	Class	Laps	Pos.	Class Pos.
2007	(United Kingdom) Rollcentre Racing	(United Kingdom) Stuart Hall (United Kingdom) Martin Short	Mosler MT900R GT3	2	GT3	567	**2nd**	**2nd**
2008	(United Kingdom) Track Power Motorsport	(United Kingdom) Ian Bankhurst (United Kingdom) Richard Bay (United Kingdom) Stephen Keating (United Kingdom) Dennis Leech (United Kingdom) Richard Stanton	TVR Sagaris V8	7	1	0	DNF	DNF
2010	(United Kingdom) Rollcentre Racing	(United Kingdom) Jon Barnes (United Kingdom) Martin Short (United Kingdom) Steve Quick	Mosler MT900R	6	1	179	DNF	DNF
