= Hamish Irvine =

British racing driver (born 1946)

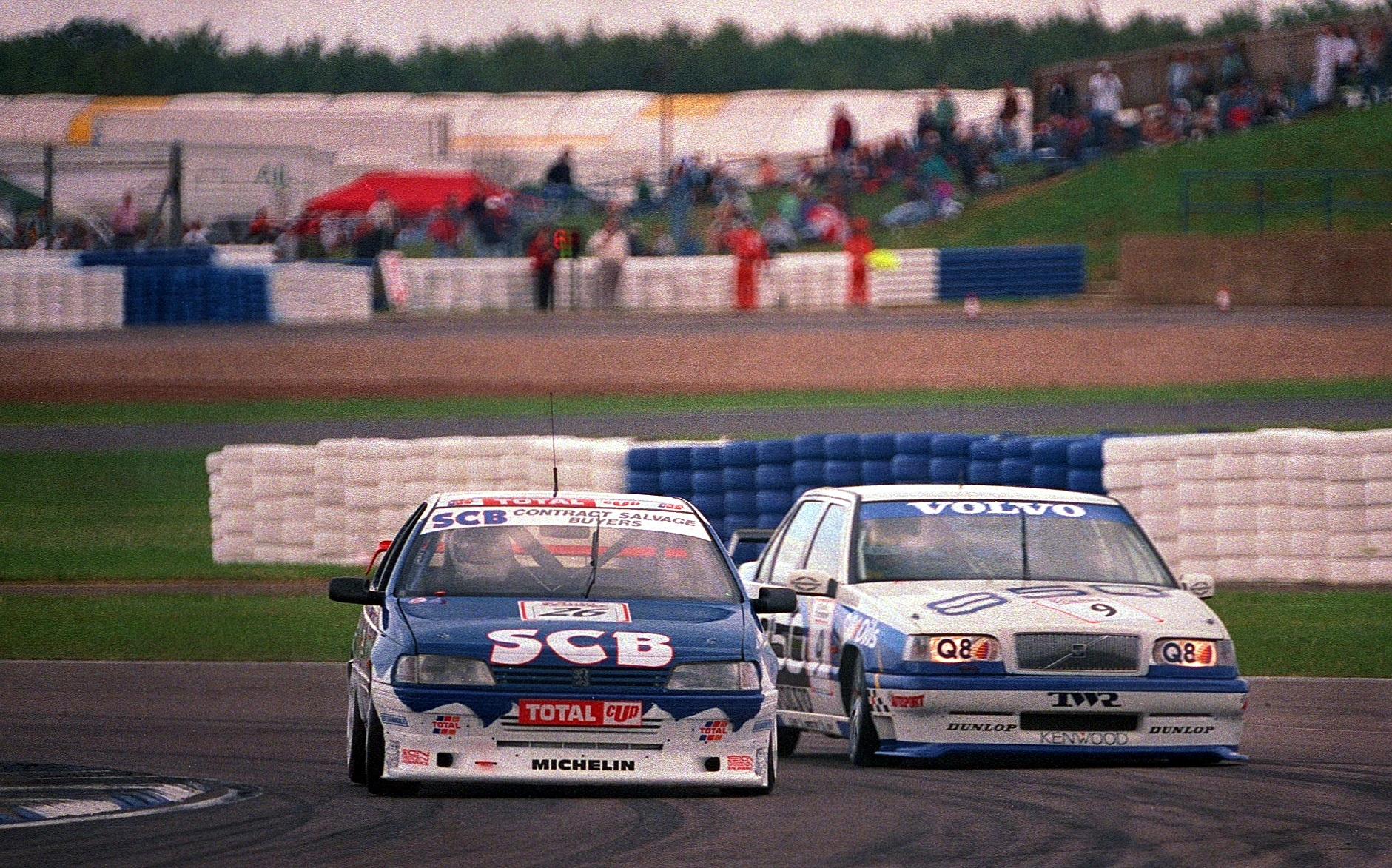
- Irvine driving the SCB Vehicle Dismantlers Peugeot 405 at Silverstone during the 1995 British Touring Car Championship season.
- Nationality: (United Kingdom) British
- Born: Hamish Edward Thomson Irvine; 1 October 1946 (age 80)

British Saloon / Touring Car Championship
- Years active: 1982–1984, 1994–1995
- Starts: 60
- Wins: 0 (4 in class)
- Poles: 0 (2 in class)
- Fastest laps: 0 (4 in class)
- Best finish: 5th in 1983

Championship titles
- 1982: BSCC - Class C

Hamish Edward Thomson Irvine (born 1 October 1946) is a British auto racing driver from Scotland. He is best known for his time competing in the British Touring Car Championship. In his debut season in 1983, he finished fifth overall in the championship with his Class B Mazda RX-7. He returned to the series in 1994 with a privately entered BMW 318iS with little success. In 1995, he finished fourth in the Independents Cup with a Peugeot 405 entered by his own SCB Motorsport Team. He is not related to former Formula One driver Eddie Irvine.

== Racing record ==
=== Complete British Saloon / Touring Car Championship results ===
(key) Races in bold indicate pole position (1982–1984 in class) Races in italics indicate fastest lap (1 point awarded - 1982-1984 only in class)

Year	Team	Car	Class	1	2	3	4	5	6	7	8	9	10	11	12	13	14	15	16	17	18	19	20	21	22	23	24	25	Pos.	Pts	Class
1982	Hamish Irvine	Triumph Dolomite Sprint	C	SIL ovr:? cls:3	MAL ovr:8† cls:2†	OUL ovr:7† cls:1†	THR ovr:16 cls:2	THR ovr:15 cls:1	SIL; Ret	DON ovr:17 cls:3	**BRH** ovr:11 cls:2	DON ovr:8 cls:2	BRH ovr:12 cls:1	SIL ovr:12 cls:3															6th	59	1st
1983	Hamish Irvine	Mazda RX-7	B	SIL ovr:8 cls:1	**OUL** ovr:6 cls:2	THR ovr:5 cls:2	BRH ovr:5 cls:2	THR ovr:7 cls:3	SIL	DON ovr:6 cls:3	SIL ovr:20 cls:2	DON; Ret	BRH ovr:9 cls:2	SIL; Ret															5th	42	2nd
1984	Hamish Irvine	Mazda RX-7	B	DON	SIL	OUL	THR	THR	SIL	SNE	BRH ovr:10 cls:3	BRH	DON	SIL															21st	4	7th
1994	Hamish Irvine	BMW 318is		THR	BRH; 1	BRH; 2	SNE	SIL; 1; 23	SIL; 2; 20	OUL; Ret	DON; 1; 23	DON; 2 Ret	BRH; 1; 21	BRH; 2 Ret	SIL; 14	KNO; 1; 13	KNO; 2 Ret	OUL; 16	BRH; 1; 21	BRH; 2 DNS	SIL; 1; 23	SIL; 2 DNS	DON; 1; 21	DON; 2; 23					31st	0	
1995	SCB Vehicle Dismantlers	Peugeot 405 Mi16		DON; 1 Ret	DON; 2; 18	BRH; 1 Ret	BRH; 2; 18	THR; 1 Ret	THR; 2 DNS	SIL; 1; 15	SIL; 2 Ret	OUL; 1; 16	OUL; 2 Ret	BRH; 1; 14	BRH; 2; 16	DON; 1; 18	DON; 2; 15	SIL; 18	KNO; 1; 14	KNO; 2; 17	BRH; 1; 20	BRH; 2 Ret	SNE; 1 Ret	SNE; 2 DNS	OUL; 1; 17	OUL; 2; 16	SIL; 1; 14	SIL; 2 Ret	27th	0	

† Events with 2 races staged for the different classes.

=== 24 Hours of Silverstone results ===
Year	Team	Co-Drivers	Car	Car No.	Class	Laps	Pos.	Class Pos.	Ref
2007	(United Kingdom) GP Motorsport	(United Kingdom) John Irvine (United Kingdom) Ed Lovett (United Kingdom) Guy Povey	BMW M3 E46	49	1	189	DNF	DNF	
2008	(United Kingdom) GP Motorsport	(United Kingdom) Guy Povey (Republic of Ireland) Mike Simpson (United Kingdom) Clint Bardwell	BMW M3 E46	42	3	548	12th	**2nd**	
