= Daniels Motorsport =

(United Kingdom) Daniels Motorsport
- Team principal(s): Pete Daniels
- Current series: BTCC

Daniels Motorsport is a motorsport team based in the United Kingdom. The team are perhaps best known for their involvement in Ford Fiesta racing series and occasional appearances in the British Touring Car Championship.

== History ==
=== British Touring Car Championship ===
==== 2005 ====
Daniels Motorsport made their BTCC running under the Team Nuts with Daniels Motorsport banner. The team campaigned a single Vauxhall Astra Coupé for Andy Neate

==== 2006 ====
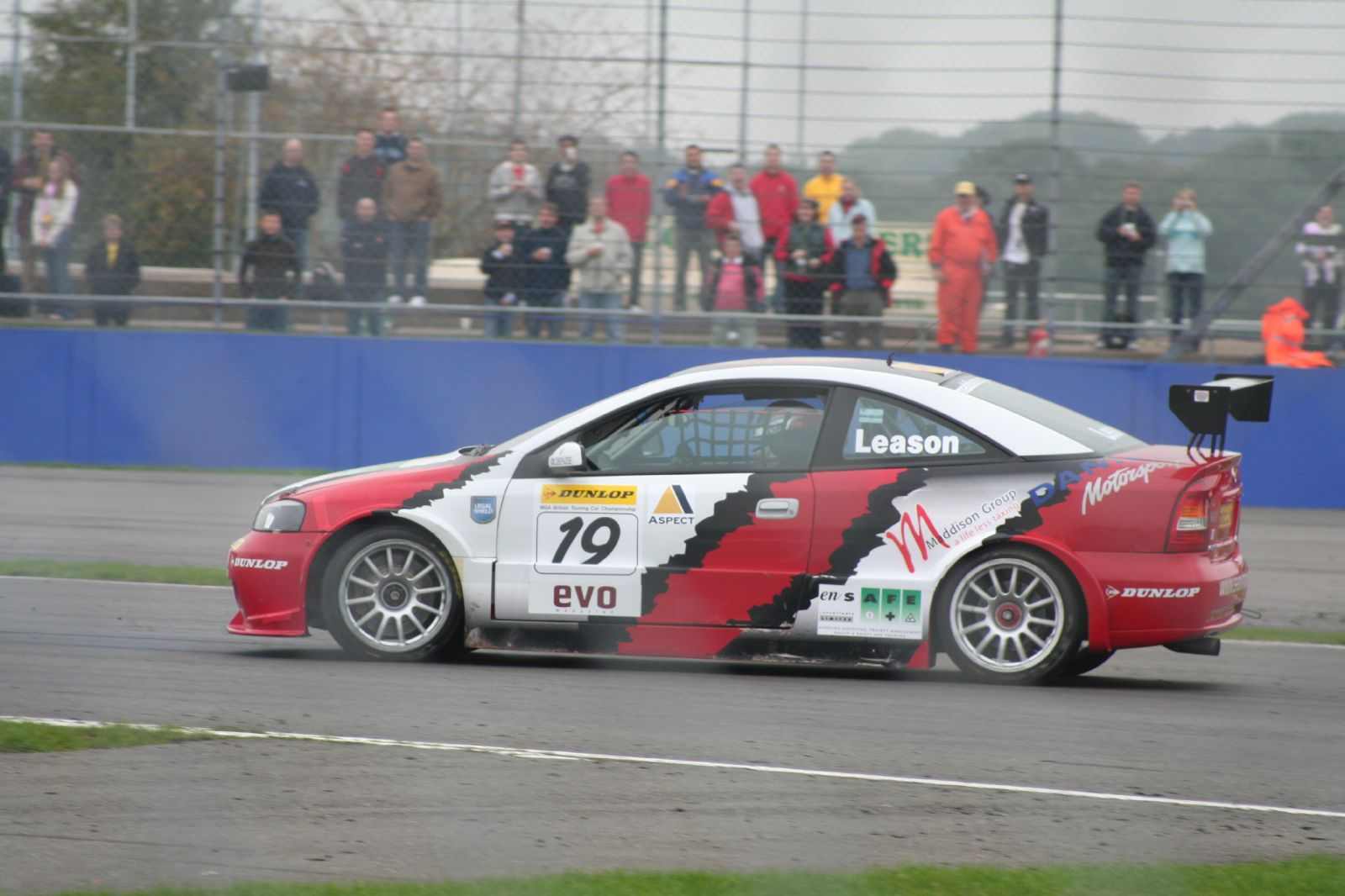
Nick Leason in the Daniels-run Astra Coupé, Silverstone 2006

In 2006 the team continued with the same car for Nick Leason in the latter two rounds of the BTCC season under the name of Team NJL Racing with Daniels Motorsport.
