= List of British Touring Car Championship teams and drivers =

== Drivers ==
This is a list of racing drivers who have competed in the British Touring Car Championship, sorted alphabetically by surname. Drivers who participated in the 2026 season are highlighted in bold.

=== A ===
Name	Country	Seasons
Hunter Abbott	England	2014–2016
Jonathan Adam	Scotland	2009
Len Adams	England	1958–1960
Nigel Albon	England	1994
Jeff Allam	England	1977–1983, 1986–1987, 1989–1995
Dave Allan	England	2001–2002
Matt Allison	England	2007–2008
Ian Ashley	England	1993
Rob Austin	England	2011–2018, 2020
Gary Ayles	England	1988–1989, 1991–1992, 1996
Laurent Aïello	France	1999

=== B ===
Name	Country	Seasons
John B&Q	England	2001–2002
Julian Bailey	England	1991–1995
Tom Barley	England	2013
Craig Baird	New Zealand	1998
Nick Beaumont	England	2001
Simon Belcher	England	2014–2015
Martyn Bell	England	2006–2009
Ray Bellm	England	1990–1993
Phil Bennett	England	2001–2003
**Ryan** **Bensley**	England	2025–Present
Michael Bentwood	England	2003–2004
Frank Biela	Germany	1996–1997
John Bintcliffe	England	1996–1998
Colin Blair	Scotland	2000–2001
Mark Blair	England	1999, 2001
Simon Blanckley	England	2007
Alan Blencowe	England	2002–2003
Mark Blundell	England	2019
Carl Boardley	England	2018–2022
Tom Boardman	England	2001–2003, 2010–2011, 2018
Jean-Christophe Boullion	France	1999
David Brabham	Australia	1995
Will Bratt	England	2012–2013
Hyla Breese	Australia	2002
Carl Breeze	England	2002–2004
Lee Brookes	England	1996–1999
Ollie Brown	England	2020
Jan Brunstedt	Sweden	1997
Will Burns	England	2017
Kelvin Burt	England	1990, 1994–1997, 2002, 2004
Mike Bushell	England	2013, 2015, 2018–2020
Rory Butcher	Scotland	2017–2023
Jack Butel	Jersey	2020–2023
Charlie Butler-Henderson	England	2004
Danny Buxton	England	2003
**Max Buxton**	England	2025–2026
Martin Byford	England	2011

=== C ===
Name	Country	Seasons
Michael Caine	England	2011, 2013, 2016, 2018–2019
**Dan Cammish**	England	2018–Present
Ian Cantwell	England	1993
Peter Cate	England	2001–2002
Johnny Cecotto	Venezuela	1995
**Tom Chilton**	England	2002–2011, 2017–2026
Jim Clark	Scotland	1963–1966
Jack Clarke	England	2014
Joanna Clarke	England	2001
John Cleland	Scotland	1989–1999
Max Coates	England	2015
James Cole	England	2013–2018
**Ricky Collard**	England	2018, 2022–2023, 2026–Present
Rob Collard	England	2000–2019
Ben Collins	England	2010
**Josh Cook**	England	2015–Present
Paula Cook	England	1998–1999
Tom Coronel	Netherlands	2007
Charlie Cox	Australia	1995
Michael Crees	England	2019–2020, 2022-2023, 2025
Ian Curley	England	2005

=== D ===
Name	Country	Seasons
Luke Davenport	England	2017
**Daryl De Leon**	Philippines	2023–Present
Martin Depper	England	2010, 2014–2017
**Mikey Doble**	England	2023–Present
Martin Donnelly	Northern Ireland	2015
**James Dorlin**	England	2025–2026
Darren Dowling	England	2006
Michael Doyle	England	2008

=== E ===
Name	Country	Seasons
Dan Eaves	England	2000–2005, 2009
Jim Edwards Jr.	England	2001–2003
Jade Edwards	England	2020–2023
Michael Epps	England	2016–2017
Thomas Erdos	Brazil	2001

=== F ===
Name	Country	Seasons
Tom Ferrier	England	2000–2001, 2006–2007
Flavio Figueiredo	Brazil	1998
Kelvin Fletcher	England	2016
Ian Flux	England	1988–1993
Arthur Forster	England	2010
Nick Foster	England	2011–2015
Mark Fullalove	England	2002–2003
Howard Fuller	England	2012–2013, 2020

=== G ===
Name	Country	Seasons
Kieran Gallagher	Scotland	2013, 2015
Colin Gallie	Scotland	1997
George Gamble	England	2022–2023
Frank Gardner	Australia	1963–1965, 1967–1973
Glynn Geddie	Scotland	2014, 2018, 2020–2021
John George	England	2004, 2007–2011
**Lewis Gilbert**	Scotland	2026
Tony Gilham	England	2011–2012, 2015–2016
Fabrizio Giovanardi	Italy	2006–2010, 2014
Joe Girling	England	2013
Phil Glew	England	2010
Jack Goff	England	2013–2021
Chris Goodwin	England	1993–1994
James Gornall	England	2020, 2022–2023
Simon Graves	England	2001
Robb Gravett	England	1987–1998
Liam Griffin	England	2011–2013

=== H ===
Name	Country	Seasons
Fariqe Hairuman	Malaysia	2004
Max Hall	England	2025
**Nick Halstead**	England	2021, 2023–Present
Matt Hamilton	England	2009–2010
**Nicolas Hamilton**	England	2015, 2019–2023, 2025–Present
Ash Hand	England	2022
Simon Harrison	England	1995, 2000–2001
Tim Harvey	England	1987–1998, 2001–2002
Richard Hawken	England	2015
Jessica Hawkins	England	2020–2021
Johnny Herbert	England	2009
Ian Heward	England	1996–1997
Jake Hill	England	2013, 2015–2025
Luke Hines	England	2003–2005, 2014
Stefan Hodgetts	England	2004
Shaun Hollamby	England	2010–2011, 2013
Robb Holland	United States	2012–2015
Paddy Hopkirk	Ireland	1963–1966
Barry Horne	Scotland	2015
Mark Howard	England	2016
Gareth Howell	Wales	2000–2003, 2005–2008
Will Hoy	England	1987–1989, 1991–2000
Rob Huff	England	2004, 2017, 2023–2024
Jason Hughes	England	2003–2008
Tony Hughes	England	2011–2012
Warren Hughes	England	2001–2003
Marc Hynes	England	2014

=== I ===
Name	Country	Seasons
**Tom Ingram**	England	2014–Present
Hamish Irvine	Scotland	1982–1984, 1994–1995

=== J ===
Name	Country	Seasons
Mat Jackson	England	2001, 2007–2017
Ollie Jackson	England	2011–2014, 2016–2022
Chris James	England	2011–2012
Nick James	England	2000–2001
Stephen Jelley	England	2008–2009, 2017–2023, 2025
Martin Johnson	England	2009–2010
Adam Jones	England	2006–2009
Karl Jones	Wales	1985, 1987–1990, 1992
Mark Jones	England	2006
Andrew Jordan	England	2008–2019, 2021
Mike Jordan	England	1989, 2006–2008

=== K ===
Name	Country	Seasons
Steven Kane	Northern Ireland	2008, 2010
**Osamu Kawashima**	Japan	2026
James Kaye	England	1986, 1988–1989, 1992–1996, 2000–2006, 2010, 2013
Richard Kaye	England	1995–1996
Justin Keen	England	2004
Matt Kelly	England	2001
Rick Kerry	England	2007
Ian Khan	England	1993–1994
Geoff Kimber-Smith	England	2000
Peter Kox	Netherlands	1996, 1998–2000
Rick Kraemer	England	2001
Tom Kristensen	Denmark	2000
Erkut Kızılırmak	Turkey	2006–2008

=== L ===
Name	Country	Seasons
Nick Leason	England	2006–2007, 2009
Fiona Leggate	England	2005–2007
Mark Lemmer	England	1998, 2000–2001
David Leslie	Scotland	1987, 1989–2000, 2002–2003
James Levy	England	2001
Stewart Lines	England	2015–2017
Lee Linford	England	2000
**Daniel Lloyd**	England	2010, 2016–2018, 2021–2023, 2025–Present
John Love	Rhodesia	1962–1964
Kurt Luby	England	1990, 2001

=== M ===
Name	Country	Seasons
Alex MacDowall	England	2010–2011
Nigel Mansell	England	1998
Richard Marsh	England	2003–2004, 2006–2007
Spencer Marsh	England	2002
Alex Martin	England	2015–2016
Aaron Mason	England	2013
Owen McAuley	Northern Ireland	1996
Liam McMillan	England	2009
Colin McRae	Scotland	1992
Richard Meins	England	2001
Alain Menu	Switzerland	1992–2000, 2007, 2014–2015
Andy Middlehurst	England	1988, 1990–1992, 2000
Jack Mitchell	England	2021
**Aiden Moffat**	Scotland	2013–Present
Gianni Morbidelli	Italy	1998
**Adam Morgan**	England	2012–Present
Alan Morrison	Northern Ireland	2000, 2002–2003, 2009
Yvan Muller	France	1998–2005
Eoin Murray	Ireland	2006–2007
Roger Möen	Norway	1998, 2001

=== N ===
Name	Country	Seasons
James Nash	England	2009–2011, 2018
Matt Neal	England	1991–2020
Andy Neate	England	2001, 2005, 2010–2013, 2016, 2020–2021
Tiff Needell	England	1987–1989, 1992–1994, 1998, 2001
Dave Newsham	Scotland	2011–2017
Kris Nissen	Denmark	1992
Marc Nordon	England	2000
David Nye	England	2013

=== O ===
Name	Country	Seasons
Eugene O'Brien	England	1993–1994
Paul O'Neill	England	2001–2003, 2006–2007, 2009–2013
Tom Oliphant	England	2018–2022
Stuart Oliver	England	2008
Bob Olthoff	South Africa	1963–1964
Tom Onslow-Cole	England	2007–2013, 2020
**Sam Osborne**	England	2019–

=== P ===
Name	Country	Seasons
Derek Palmer Jr.	Scotland	2015
Rick Parfitt Jr.	England	2021–2022
**Dexter Patterson**	Scotland	2022–2023, 2025–Present
Ronan Pearson	Scotland	2023–2025
Win Percy	England	1975–1984, 1987–1989, 1993
James Pickford	England	2005
David Pinkney	England	1989, 1993, 2001, 2006–2007, 2009–2011
David Pitcher	England	2000
Jason Plato	England	1997–2001, 2004–2019, 2021–2022
Jim Pocklington	England	2007
Alex Portman	England	1992–1993
Guy Povey	England	1992
Will Powell	England	2022–2023
Andy Priaulx	Guernsey	2001–2002, 2015
Josh Price	England	2017–2018
Mark Proctor	England	2005–2006
Senna Proctor	England	2017–2021, 2025-
Gavin Pyper	Scotland	2000–2004

=== R ===
Name	Country	Seasons
Vincent Radermecker	Belgium	1999–2000
Paul Radisich	New Zealand	1990, 1993–1998
**Charles Rainford**	Scotland	2025–Present
Roberto Ravaglia	Italy	1994, 1996
Anthony Reid	Scotland	1994–2004, 2009
Paul Rivett	Scotland	2020–2021
Steve Robertson	England	1996
Andy Rouse	England	1973–1976, 1978–1994
Toni Ruokonen	Finland	2000–2001
Tommy Rustad	Norway	1998
**Daniel Rowbottom**	England	2019, 2021–Present
Chris Ryan	England	2003
Rickard Rydell	Sweden	1994–2000

=== S ===
Name	Country	Seasons
Graham Saunders	England	2002
Warren Scott	England	2013–2016
Jack Sears	England	1958–1965
**Lewis Selby**	England	2026–Present
**Gordon Shedden**	Scotland	2001, 2006–2017, 2021–2022, 2025–Present
George "Doc" Shepherd	England	1958–1961
Norman Simon	Germany	2002
Giampiero Simoni	Italy	1994–1995
Matt Simpson	England	2016–2019
Aaron Slight	New Zealand	2001–2002
Sam Smelt	England	2018, 2021
**Chris Smiley**	Northern Ireland	2016–2021, 2024–Present
Brett Smith	England	2017–2018
Gavin Smith	Ireland	2004–2007
Jeff Smith	England	2010–2013, 2015–2017
Mark Smith	England	2006
Nigel Smith	England	1994–1995
Rob Smith	England	2019
**Árón Smith**	Ireland	2011–2017, 2021–Present
Steve Soper	England	1982–1985, 1988–1989, 1991–1994, 2001
Tommy Sopwith	England	1958
Jamie Spence	England	1996
Russell Spence	England	1999
John Sprinzel	England	1958–1959
Geoff Steel	England	1994
Chris Stockton	England	2006–2008, 2012, 2014
Dennis Strandberg	Sweden	2017
Tim Sugden	England	1990–1992, 1994–1995
Steve Sutcliffe	England	2001
**Ashley Sutton**	England	2016–
Chris Swanwick	England	2011
Scott Sumpton	England	2024
Frank Sytner	England	1982–1985, 1987–1991

=== T ===
Name	Country	Seasons
Gabriele Tarquini	Italy	1994–1995, 1997, 1999–2000
Alan Taylor	England	2007–2008
**Árón** **Taylor-Smith** (Note: Árón Smith competed as Árón Taylor-Smith from 2017 onwards after his marriage.)	Ireland	2011–2017, 2021–Present
Annie Templeton	England	2001–2002
Mark Thomas	Wales	2002
Bobby Thompson	England	2018–2020, 2022–2024
James Thompson	England	1994–2004, 2006, 2009, 2011
John Thorne	England	2011–2012
Thorkild Thyrring	Denmark	1992
Sam Tordoff	England	2010, 2013–2016, 2018–2019
Colin Turkington	Northern Ireland	2002–2009, 2013–2024
Darren Turner	England	2006–2008

=== V ===
Name	Country	Seasons
Eric van de Poele	Belgium	1994
Harry Vaulkhard	England	2008–2009
Bobby Verdon-Roe	England	1992–1993

=== W ===
Name	Country	Seasons
Jamie Wall	England	1997
Paul Wallace	England	2003–2004
Derek Warwick	England	1995, 1997–1998
Andrew Watson	Northern Ireland	2023-2024
Shaun Watson-Smith	South Africa	2004
Patrick Watts	England	1983–1985, 1987–1988, 1992–1997
James Weaver	England	1984, 1988–1989, 1992
Daniel Welch	England	2011–2016, 2018
Jay Wheals	England	2003–2004
Ant Whorton-Eales	England	2017–2018
Richard Williams	England	2005
Aaron Williamson	England	2012
Bryce Wilson	Scotland	2000
Andy Wilmot	England	2013, 2015
Joachim Winkelhock	Germany	1993–1994, 1996
Lea Wood	England	2010–2014
Steve Wood	England	2001–2002
Frank Wrathall	England	2011–2013

=== Z ===
Name	Country	Seasons
Dan Zelos	England	2024

== Teams ==
=== Alfa Romeo ===
Year	Team entry	Team name	Model	Class	No.	Driver	Rounds	DC	Pts
1994	Alfa Corse	Alfa Corse	155 TS	M	55	(Italy) Gabriele Tarquini	1–4, 6–13	1st	298
1994	Alfa Corse	Alfa Corse	155 TS	M	56	(Italy) Giampiero Simoni	1–4, 6–13	5th	156
1995	Alfa Romeo Old Spice Racing	Prodrive	155 TS	M	1	(Italy) Gabriele Tarquini	5, 9–13	16th	33
1995	Alfa Romeo Old Spice Racing	Prodrive	155 TS	M	5	(Italy) Giampiero Simoni	1–8	17th	27
1995	Alfa Romeo Old Spice Racing	Prodrive	155 TS	M	55	(United Kingdom) Derek Warwick	All	19th	15
2000	Gary Ayles Motorsport	GA Motorsport	156	B	16	(United Kingdom) Tom Ferrier	10–12	8th*	18
2000	Gary Ayles Motorsport	GA Motorsport	156	B	44	(United Kingdom) Gavin Pyper	10–11	16th*	1
2001	JS Motorsport	JS Motorsport	147	I	14	(United Kingdom) Tom Ferrier	2, 7–9, 12–13	10th	20
2001	JS Motorsport	JS Motorsport	147	I	15	(United Kingdom) Dave Pinkney	1–4	13th	14
2001	JS Motorsport	JS Motorsport	147	I	16	(United Kingdom) Tim Harvey	3–4, 9–13	8th	43
2001	JS Motorsport	JS Motorsport	147	I	17	(United Kingdom) Mark Blair	10–11	12th	15
2001	GA-Janspeed Racing	GA Motorsport	156	P	64	(United Kingdom) Gavin Pyper	All	6th*	120
2001	GA-Janspeed Racing	GA Motorsport	156	P	65	(United Kingdom) Colin Blair	All	18th*	22
2002	Gary Ayles Motorsport	GA Motorsport	156	P	55	(United Kingdom) Graham Saunders	All	11th*	60
2002	Gary Ayles Motorsport	GA Motorsport	156	P	56	(United Kingdom) Alan Blencowe	All	7th*	76
2002	Gary Ayles Motorsport	GA Motorsport	156	P	57	(United Kingdom) Gavin Pyper	2–3, 5–10	4th*	107
2002	Gary Ayles Motorsport	GA Motorsport	156	P	58	(United Kingdom) Kelvin Burt	4	NC*	-
2003	GA Motorsports	GA Motorsport	156	P	54	(United Kingdom) Paul Wallace	1–5	6th*	46
2003	GA Motorsports	GA Motorsport	156	P	55	(United Kingdom) Chris Ryan	1–2	10th*	14
2004	Team Sureterm	GA Motorsport	156	I	23	(United Kingdom) Carl Breeze	1–7	15th	14
2004	Team Sureterm	GA Motorsport	156	I	26	(United Kingdom) Stefan Hodgetts	8–10	18th	4
2006	Quest Racing	Quest Racing	156	I	17	(Republic of Ireland) Eoin Murray	5–7, 9–10	17th	8
2006	InFront Motorsport	InFront Motorsport	156	I	66	(United Kingdom) Mark Smith	1, 3–7, 9–10	23rd	0
2007	Quest Racing	Quest Racing	156	I	14	(Republic of Ireland) Eoin Murray	1–4, 6–8, 10	18th	9
2007	A-Tech	A-Tech	156	I	56	(United Kingdom) Dave Pinkney	1–8, 10	20th	5
2007	A-Tech	A-Tech	156	I	59	(United Kingdom) Richard Marsh	1–8	30th	0
2018	DUO Motorsport with HMS Racing	Belcher Motorsport	Giulietta	I	11	(United Kingdom) Rob Austin	All	14th	126

=== Audi ===
Year	Team entry	Team name	Model	Class	No.	Driver	Rounds	DC	Pts
1996	Audi Sport UK	Apex Motorsport	A4 quattro	M	44	(United Kingdom) John Bintcliffe	All	7th	113
1996	Audi Sport UK	Apex Motorsport	A4 quattro	M	45	(Germany) Frank Biela	All	1st	289
1997	Audi Sport UK	Apex Motorsport	A4 quattro	M	1	(Germany) Frank Biela	All	2nd	171
1997	Audi Sport UK	Apex Motorsport	A4 quattro	M	7	(United Kingdom) John Bintcliffe	All	7th	119
1998	Audi Sport UK	Apex Motorsport	A4	M	7	(United Kingdom) John Bintcliffe	All	15th	23
1998	Audi Sport UK	Apex Motorsport	A4	M	12	(France) Yvan Muller	All	7th	110
2011	Rob Austin Racing	Rob Austin Racing	A4	I	12	(United Kingdom) Dave Pinkney	1	NC	-
2011	Rob Austin Racing	Rob Austin Racing	A4	I	13	(United Kingdom) Rob Austin	2–10	16th	26
2011	Rob Austin Racing	Rob Austin Racing	A4	I	31	(United Kingdom) Chris Swanwick	9–10	32nd	0
2012	Rob Austin Racing	Rob Austin Racing	A4	I	13	(United Kingdom) Rob Austin	1–3, 5–6, 8–10	13th	122
2012	Rob Austin Racing	Rob Austin Racing	A4	I	14	(United Kingdom) Will Bratt	4–5, 8–10	20th	38
2013	Exocet Racing	Rob Austin Racing	A4	I	9	(United Kingdom) Jake Hill	10	23rd	8
2013	WIX Racing	Rob Austin Racing	A4	I	13	(United Kingdom) Rob Austin	All	11th	154
2013	Rob Austin Racing	Rob Austin Racing	A4	I	14	(United Kingdom) Will Bratt	1–9	19th	32
2014	AlcoSense Breathalysers Racing	Rob Austin Racing	A4	I	54	(United Kingdom) Hunter Abbott	All	20th	20
2014	Exocet Racing	Rob Austin Racing	A4	I	101	(United Kingdom) Rob Austin	All	12th	147
2015	Exocet AlcoSense Racing	Rob Austin Racing	A4	I	54	(United Kingdom) Hunter Abbott	All	21st	23
2015	Exocet AlcoSense Racing	Rob Austin Racing	A4	I	101	(United Kingdom) Rob Austin	All	14th	120
2015	AmDTuning.Com	AmD Essex	S3 Saloon	I	28	(United Kingdom) Nicolas Hamilton	5-6, 8-9	NC	0
2015	AmDTuning.Com	AmD Essex	S3 Saloon	I	29	(United Kingdom) Jake Hill	10	35th	0
2016	AmDTuning.Com	AmD Essex	S3 Saloon	I	48	(United Kingdom) Ollie Jackson	All	26th	14
2017	AmDTuning.Com with Cobra Exhausts	AmD Essex	S3 Saloon	I	10	(United Kingdom) Ant Whorton-Eales	All	23rd	34
2017	AmDTuning.Com with Cobra Exhausts	AmD Essex	S3 Saloon	I	48	(United Kingdom) Ollie Jackson	All	22nd	42
2018	AmD with Cobra Exhausts	AmD Essex	S3 Saloon	I	23	(United Kingdom) Sam Smelt	All	34th	0
2018	AmD with Cobra Exhausts	AmD Essex	S3 Saloon	I	48	(United Kingdom) Ollie Jackson	All	23rd	59
2019	TradePriceCars.Com	AmD Essex	S3 Saloon	I	8	(United Kingdom) Mark Blundell	All	27th	5
2019	TradePriceCars.Com	AmD Essex	S3 Saloon	I	24	(United Kingdom) Jake Hill	All	15th	131

=== BMW ===
Year	Team entry	Team name	Model	Class	No.	Driver	Rounds	DC	Pts
1991	Pyramid Motorsport	Pyramid Motorsport	M3	I	2	(United Kingdom) Frank Sytner	1–8, 10–11	12th	26
1991	Pyramid Motorsport	Pyramid Motorsport	M3	I	2	(United Kingdom) David Leslie	13	16th	12
1991	Pyramid Motorsport	Pyramid Motorsport	M3	I	18	(United Kingdom) Matt Neal	7	30th	0
1991	Pyramid Motorsport	Pyramid Motorsport	M3	I	18	(United Kingdom) Alistair Fenwick	12	NC	-
1991	Pyramid Motorsport	Pyramid Motorsport	M3	I	18	(United Kingdom) Godfrey Hall	13	37th	0
1991	BMW Team Labatt's	Vic Lee Racing	M3	M	4	(United Kingdom) Tim Harvey	All	8th	42
1991	BMW Team Labatt's	Vic Lee Racing	M3	M	9	(United Kingdom) Laurence Bristow	1–11, 13	13th	20
1991	BMW Team Labatt's	Vic Lee Racing	M3	M	9	(Germany) Armin Hahne	12	15th	12
1991	BMW Team Sweden	BMW Team Sweden	M3	I	10	(Sweden) Nettan Lindgren	1–3, 5–6	24th	1
1991	BMW Team Sweden	BMW Team Sweden	M3	I	91	(Sweden) Peggen Andersson	1–3, 6	19th	6
1991	BMW Team Listerine	Vic Lee Racing	M3	M	11	(United Kingdom) Will Hoy	All	1st	155
1991	BMW Team Listerine	Vic Lee Racing	M3	M	12	(United Kingdom) Ray Bellm	All	5th	90
1991	R&D Motorsport	R&D Motorsport	318is	I	13	(United Kingdom) Angus MacKay	1–2	32nd	0
1991	R&D Motorsport	R&D Motorsport	318is	I	13	(United Kingdom) Alistair Lyall	4, 7, 13	36th	0
1991	BMW Team Finance	Prodrive	M3	M	22	(United Kingdom) Jonathan Palmer	All	7th	66
1991	BMW Team Finance	Prodrive	M3	M	44	(United Kingdom) Steve Soper	1, 3, 7–10, 12	4th	96
1991	BMW Team Finance	Prodrive	M3	M	44	(United Kingdom) Tim Sugden	2, 5–6, 11, 13	10th	32
1991	BMW Team Finance	Prodrive	M3	M	44	(Germany) Christian Danner	4	18th	8
1991	Drambuie Racing	Drambuie Racing	M3	I	45	(United Kingdom) Ian Forrest	All	27th	0
1991	BRR Motorsport	BRR Motorsport	M3	I	59	(United Kingdom) Ian Flux	1, 3–5, 13	22nd	1
1991	BRR Motorsport	BRR Motorsport	M3	I	59	(Sweden) Val Musetti	11	31st	0
1991	Auto Trader Techspeed Team	Tech-Speed Motorsport	M3	I	66	(United Kingdom) Nick Whale	1–5, 8–9, 11–13	25th	1
1991	Auto Trader Techspeed Team	Tech-Speed Motorsport	M3	I	66	(United Kingdom) David Leslie	7	16th	12
1991	Auto Trader Techspeed Team	Tech-Speed Motorsport	M3	I	77	(United Kingdom) Nick Baird	1–5, 7–8, 12–13	21st	2
1991	Auto Trader Techspeed Team	Tech-Speed Motorsport	M3	I	77	(United Kingdom) Matt Neal	9, 11	30th	0
1991	Auto Trader Techspeed Team	Tech-Speed Motorsport	M3	I	77	(United Kingdom) John Llewellyn	10	26th	0
1992	M Team Shell Racing with Listerine	Vic Lee Racing	318is	M	4	(United Kingdom) Steve Soper	2–3, 5–6, 8–12	6th	77
1992	M Team Shell Racing with Listerine	Vic Lee Racing	318is	M	5	(United Kingdom) Ray Bellm	1–9	13th	15
1992	M Team Shell Racing with Listerine	Vic Lee Racing	318is	M	8	(United Kingdom) Tim Harvey	All	1st	152
1992	M Team Mobil	Prodrive	318is	M	10	(United Kingdom) Tim Sugden	All	8th	43
1992	M Team Mobil	Prodrive	318is	M	30	(Switzerland) Alain Menu	1–8	9th	27
1992	M Team Mobil	Prodrive	318is	M	30	(Denmark) Kris Nissen	9–12	11th	18
1992	M Team Mobil	Prodrive	318is	M	50	(United Kingdom) Colin McRae	8	25th	1
1992	Rimstock Racing	Prodrive	M3	I	12	(United Kingdom) Matt Neal	1–11	16th	5
1992	Rimstock Racing	Prodrive	318is	I	12	(United Kingdom) Matt Neal	12	16th	5
1992	Bristow Motorsport	Laurence Bristow	M3	I	15	(United Kingdom) Laurence Bristow	1, 7, 9	29th	0
1992	Roy Kennedy Racing	Roy Kennedy Racing	M3	I	17	(United Kingdom) Ian Flux	1–3, 7	21st	4
1992	Techspeed Racing	Tech-Speed Motorsport	M3	I	20	(United Kingdom) Sean Walker	1–7, 9–12	20th	4
1992	Techspeed Racing	Tech-Speed Motorsport	M3	I	22	(United Kingdom) Karl Jones	1–8	28th	0
1992	Techspeed Racing	Tech-Speed Motorsport	M3	I	33	(United Kingdom) Guy Povey	1	33rd	0
1992	Techspeed Racing	Tech-Speed Motorsport	M3	I	33	(United Kingdom) Alistair Lyall	12	32nd	0
1992	Ian Forrest	Ian Forrest	M3	I	25	(United Kingdom) Ian Forrest	8, 12	27th	0
1993	BMW Motorsport Team	Schnitzer Motorsport	318i	M	6	(United Kingdom) Steve Soper	All	2nd	150
1993	BMW Motorsport Team	Schnitzer Motorsport	318i	M	22	(Germany) Joachim Winkelhock	All	1st	163
1993	Team Dynamics	Team Dynamics	318is	I	11	(United Kingdom) Ray Bellm	2–4, 6–8	29th	0
1993	Team Dynamics	Team Dynamics	318is	I	11	(United Kingdom) Andy Wallace	5	28th	0
1993	Team Dynamics	Team Dynamics	318is	I	13	(United Kingdom) Matt Neal	1–11	20th	3
1993	Team Dynamics	Team Dynamics	318is	I	27	(United Kingdom) Alex Portman	1–6, 8–14	25th	1
1993	Team Dynamics	Team Dynamics	318i	I	77	(United Kingdom) Matt Neal	12	20th	3
1993	Pinkney Motorsport	Pinkney Motorsport	318is	I	12	(United Kingdom) Dave Pinkney	1–8, 11	30th	0
1993	Peggen Motorsport	Peggen Motorsport	M3	I	12	(Sweden) Peggen Andersson	1–2	NC	-
1994	BMW Motorsport Team Schnitzer	Schnitzer Motorsport	318i	M	1	(Germany) Joachim Winkelhock	All	6th	147
1994	BMW Motorsport Team Schnitzer	Schnitzer Motorsport	318i	M	2	(United Kingdom) Steve Soper	1–3, 5, 7, 9, 11–13	7th	102
1994	BMW Motorsport Team Schnitzer	Schnitzer Motorsport	318i	M	21	(Italy) Roberto Ravaglia	4, 6, 8, 10	18th	10
1994	Geoff Steel Racing	Geoff Steel Racing	318is	I	22	(United Kingdom) Geoff Steel	1–3, 5–6, 10–11	32nd	0
1994	Hamish Irvine	Hamish Irvine	318is	I	26	(United Kingdom) Hamish Irvine	4–13	31st	0
1995	BMW Motorsport Team	BMW M	318i	M	16	(Venezuela) Johnny Cecotto	All	12th	49
1995	BMW Motorsport Team	BMW M	318i	M	17	(Australia) David Brabham	All	13th	48
1996	BMW Team Schnitzer	Schnitzer Motorsport	320i	M	20	(Netherlands) Peter Kox	11–13	14th	26
1996	BMW Team Schnitzer	Schnitzer Motorsport	320i	M	21	(Italy) Roberto Ravaglia	All	6th	157
1996	BMW Team Schnitzer	Schnitzer Motorsport	320i	M	22	(Germany) Joachim Winkelhock	All	5th	158
1997	Team DCRS	Dave Cook Racing	318i	I	19	(United Kingdom) Colin Gallie	All	19th	2
2002	Edenbridge Racing	Edenbridge Racing	320i	P	77	(United Kingdom) Tom Boardman	All	6th*	98
2002	Edenbridge Racing	Edenbridge Racing	320i	P	78	(Germany) Norman Simon	All	2nd*	180
2003	Edenbridge Racing	Edenbridge Racing	320i	P	77	(United Kingdom) Michael Bentwood	All	3rd*	186
2004	Edenbridge Racing	Edenbridge Racing	320i	I	46	(United Kingdom) Justin Keen	All	19th	2
2006	Geoff Steel Racing	Geoff Steel Racing	320i	I	15	(United Kingdom) Martyn Bell	All	18th	8
2007	Team RAC	West Surrey Racing	320si	I	3	(United Kingdom) Colin Turkington	All	5th	184
2007	Team RAC	West Surrey Racing	320si	I	33	(United Kingdom) Tom Onslow-Cole	All	10th	109
2007	Team allaboutproperty.com	Geoff Steel Racing	320i	I	15	(United Kingdom) Martyn Bell	All	21st	3
2007	AFM Racing	AFM Racing	120d	I	17	(United Kingdom) Rick Kerry	1–3, 5, 7–8, 10	28th	0
2007	J-Team Motorsport with Tech Tuning	Jim Pocklington	320i	I	45	(United Kingdom) Jim Pocklington	1–2, 4–5	29th	0
2007	Jacksons M.Sport	Jacksons M.Sport	320si	I	48	(United Kingdom) Mat Jackson	All	7th	158
2008	Team RAC	West Surrey Racing	320si	I	5	(United Kingdom) Colin Turkington	All	4th	212
2008	Team RAC	West Surrey Racing	320si	I	50	(United Kingdom) Stephen Jelley	All	15th	14
2008	BMW Dealer Team UK	Jacksons M.Sport	320si	I	7	(United Kingdom) Mat Jackson	All	2nd	226
2008	Motorbase Performance	Motorbase Performance	320si	I	24	(United Kingdom) Steven Kane	All	11th	86
2008	Motorbase Performance	Motorbase Performance	320si	I	25	(United Kingdom) Rob Collard	All	12th	84

=== Chevrolet ===
Year	Team entry	Team name	Model	Class	No.	Driver	Rounds	DC	Pts
2008	Robertshaw Racing	Robertshaw Racing	Lacetti	I	16	(United Kingdom) Harry Vaulkhard	All	19th	2
2008	Robertshaw Racing	Robertshaw Racing	Lacetti	I	26	(United Kingdom) Matt Allison	1–3	17th	3
2009	Racing Silverline	RML Group	Lacetti	I	2	(United Kingdom) Mat Jackson	2–10	5th	165
2009	Racing Silverline	RML Group	Lacetti	I	3	(United Kingdom) Jason Plato	All	2nd	270
2009	Racing Silverline	RML Group	Lacetti	I	23	(United Kingdom) James Nash	4–6, 8–9	15th	24
2009	Tempus Sport	Tempus Sport	Lacetti	I	17	(United Kingdom) Harry Vaulkhard	1–5	16th	22
2009	bamboo engineering	Bamboo Engineering	Lacetti	I	17	(United Kingdom) Harry Vaulkhard	6–10	16th	22
2010	Silverline Chevrolet	RML Group	Cruze	M	2	(United Kingdom) Jason Plato	All	1st	260
2010	Silverline Chevrolet	RML Group	Cruze	M	20	(United Kingdom) Alex MacDowall	All	11th	83
2011	Silverline Chevrolet	RML Group	Cruze LT	M	1	(United Kingdom) Jason Plato	All	3rd	236
2011	Silverline Chevrolet	RML Group	Cruze LT	M	20	(United Kingdom) Alex MacDowall	All	9th	100
2011	GoMobileUK.com with tech-speed	Tech-Speed Motorsport	Cruze LT	I	28	(United Kingdom) John George	All	27th	0
2011	GoMobileUK.com with tech-speed	Tech-Speed Motorsport	Cruze LT	I	29	(United Kingdom) Paul O'Neill	All	10th	91
2011	Team ES Racing	Team ES Racing	Lacetti	I	78	(United Kingdom) Chris James	All	28th	0
2013	Finesse Motorsport	Finesse Motorsport	Cruze LT	I	16	(United Kingdom) Aiden Moffat	7	30th	3
2013	Team Club 44	IP Tech Race Engineering	Cruze	I	44	(United Kingdom) Andy Neate	6, 8–9	34th	0
2013	Team Club 44	IP Tech Race Engineering	Cruze	I	45	(United Kingdom) Mike Bushell	7	36th	0
2013	M247 Racing	Tech-Speed Motorsport	Cruze LT	I	90	(United Kingdom) Joe Girling	1–3, 5	37th	0
2014	Laser Tools Racing	Aiden Moffat Racing	Cruze	I	16	(United Kingdom) Aiden Moffat	All	25th	6
2014	Power Maxed Racing	BTC Racing	Cruze 5dr	I	28	(United Kingdom) Chris Stockton	All	31st	0

=== Ford ===
- 1991–2000
- 1991 Ford Sierra Saphire
- 1993–1995 Ford Mondeo Saloon
- 1996–2000 Ford Mondeo Hatch
- 2009 Ford Focus ST
- 2010 Ford Focus ST LPG
- 2011 Ford Focus ST
- 1991 Robb Gravett
- 1993 Paul Radisich, Andy Rouse
- 1994 Paul Radisich, Andy Rouse
- 1995 Paul Radisich, Kelvin Burt
- 1996 Paul Radisich, Steve Robertson
- 1997 Paul Radisich, Will Hoy
- 1998 Will Hoy, Craig Baird, Nigel Mansell
- 1999 Alain Menu, Anthony Reid
- 2000 Alain Menu, Anthony Reid, Rickard Rydell
- 2009 Tom Chilton, Alan Morrison, Tom Onslow-Cole
- 2010 Tom Chilton, Tom Onslow-Cole
- 2011 Tom Chilton, Tom Onslow-Cole, Andy Neate

=== Honda ===
- 1995–2000 Honda Accord
- 2002–2003 Honda Civic Type R
- 2010–2011 Honda Civic Type S
- 2012 Honda Civic
- 1995 David Leslie, James Kaye
- 1996 David Leslie, James Kaye
- 1997 James Thompson, Gabriele Tarquini
- 1998 James Thompson, Peter Kox
- 1999 James Thompson, Peter Kox, Gabriele Tarquini
- 2000 James Thompson, Gabriele Tarquini, Tom Kristensen, David Leslie
- 2002 Andy Priaulx, Alan Morrison
- 2003 Matt Neal, Alan Morrison, Tom Chilton
- 2010 Matt Neal, Gordon Shedden
- 2011 Matt Neal, Gordon Shedden
- 2012 Matt Neal, Gordon Shedden
- 2013 Matt Neal, Gordon Shedden
- 2014 Matt Neal, Gordon Shedden
- 2015 Matt Neal, Gordon Shedden

=== MG ===
Year	Team entry	Team name	Model	Class	No.	Driver	Rounds	DC	Pts
2001	MG Sport & Racing	West Surrey Racing	ZS	M	2	(United Kingdom) Anthony Reid	11–13	NC	-
2001	MG Sport & Racing	West Surrey Racing	ZS	M	20	(United Kingdom) Warren Hughes	11–13	NC	-
2002	MG Sport & Racing	West Surrey Racing	ZS	M	11	(United Kingdom) Anthony Reid	All	4th	136
2002	MG Sport & Racing	West Surrey Racing	ZS	M	12	(United Kingdom) Warren Hughes	All	6th	110
2002	Team Atomic Kitten	West Surrey Racing	ZS	I	21	(United Kingdom) Gareth Howell	2–10	12th	32
2002	Team Atomic Kitten	West Surrey Racing	ZS	I	22	(United Kingdom) Colin Turkington	2–10	14th	29
2003	MG Sport & Racing	West Surrey Racing	ZS	M	4	(United Kingdom) Anthony Reid	All	6th	121
2003	MG Sport & Racing	West Surrey Racing	ZS	M	5	(United Kingdom) Colin Turkington	All	8th	97
2003	MG Sport & Racing	West Surrey Racing	ZS	M	6	(United Kingdom) Warren Hughes	All	7th	98
2004	West Surrey Racing	West Surrey Racing	ZS	I	6	(United Kingdom) Anthony Reid	All	4th	213
2004	West Surrey Racing	West Surrey Racing	ZS	I	8	(United Kingdom) Colin Turkington	All	6th	173
2004	Kartworld Racing	Kartworld Racing	ZS	I	77	(United Kingdom) Jason Hughes	All	17th	5
2005	West Surrey Racing	West Surrey Racing	ZS	I	21	(United Kingdom) Rob Collard	All	7th	173
2005	Kartworld Racing	Kartworld Racing	ZS	I	36	(United Kingdom) Jason Hughes	6, 8, 10	13th	22
2006	Team RAC	West Surrey Racing	ZS	I	6	(United Kingdom) Colin Turkington	All	3rd	240
2006	Team RAC	West Surrey Racing	ZS	I	7	(United Kingdom) Rob Collard	All	9th	97
2006	Kartworld Racing	Kartworld Racing	ZS	I	28	(United Kingdom) Jason Hughes	All	15th	27
2007	Kartworld Racing	Kartworld Racing	ZS	I	28	(United Kingdom) Jason Hughes	All	16th	13
2007	Kartworld Racing	Kartworld Racing	ZS	I	82	(United Kingdom) Fiona Leggate	All	31st	0
2008	Team KWR	Kartworld Racing	ZS	I	28	(United Kingdom) Jason Hughes	All	20th	2
2012	MG KX Momentum Racing	Triple 8 Race Engineering	6 GT	M	44	(United Kingdom) Andy Neate	All	16th	79
2012	MG KX Momentum Racing	Triple 8 Race Engineering	6 GT	M	99	(United Kingdom) Jason Plato	All	3rd	376
2013	MG KX Momentum Racing	Triple 8 Race Engineering	6 GT	M	88	(United Kingdom) Sam Tordoff	All	6th	286
2013	MG KX Momentum Racing	Triple 8 Race Engineering	6 GT	M	99	(United Kingdom) Jason Plato	All	3rd	380
2014	MG KX Clubcard Fuel Save	Triple 8 Race Engineering	6 GT	M	88	(United Kingdom) Sam Tordoff	All	7th	255
2014	MG KX Clubcard Fuel Save	Triple 8 Race Engineering	6 GT	M	99	(United Kingdom) Jason Plato	All	2nd	399
2014	Quantel BiFold Racing	Triple 8 Race Engineering	6 GT	I	888	(United Kingdom) Marc Hynes	All	18th	54

=== Mitsubishi ===
- 1991
- Mitsubishi Galant
- Mark Hales

=== Nissan ===
- 1991–1999
- Nissan Primera
- 1991 Kieth Odor, Julian Bailey
- 1992 Kieth Odor, Andy Middlehurst, James Weaver
- 1993 Kieth Odor, Win Percy, Tiff Needell
- 1994 Kieth Odor, Eric Van de Poele, Tiff Needell
- 1996 Gary Ayles, Owen McAuley
- 1997 David Leslie, Anthony Reid
- 1998 David Leslie, Anthony Reid
- 1999 David Leslie, Laurent Aïello

=== Peugeot ===
- 1992–1995 Peugeot 405 Mi16
- 1996–1998 Peugeot 406
- 2001 Peugeot 406 Coupe
- 1992 Robb Gravett
- 1993 Robb Gravett, Eugene O’Brien, Ian Flux
- 1994 Eugene O’Brien, Patrick Watts
- 1995 Simon Harrison, Patrick Watts
- 1996 Tim Harvey, Patrick Watts
- 1997 Tim Harvey, Patrick Watts
- 1998 Tim Harvey, Paul Radisich
- 2001 Steve Soper, Dan Eaves, Aaron Slight, Matt Neal

=== Proton ===
Year	Team entry	Team name	Model	Class	No.	Driver	Rounds	DC	Pts
2002	Petronas Syntium Proton	Team PSP	Impian	M	15	(United Kingdom) David Leslie	All	7th	79
2002	Petronas Syntium Proton	Team PSP	Impian	M	20	(United Kingdom) Phil Bennett	All	16th	9
2003	Petronas Syntium Proton	Team PSP	Impian	M	15	(United Kingdom) David Leslie	All	11th	28
2003	Petronas Syntium Proton	Team PSP	Impian	M	20	(United Kingdom) Phil Bennett	All	17th	14
2004	Petronas Syntium Proton	Team PSP	Impian	M	15	(Malaysia) Fariqe Hairuman	All	23rd	0
2004	Petronas Syntium Proton	Team PSP	Impian	M	20	(South Africa) Shaun Watson-Smith	All	14th	28
2011	Welch Automotive	Welch Motorsport	Gen-2	I	42	(England) Daniel Welch	6–10	22nd	1
2012	Welch Motorsport with Sopp + Sopp	Welch Motorsport	Persona	I	12	(England) Daniel Welch	1–7, 9–10	15th	79
2013	Welch Motorsport with Sopp + Sopp	Welch Motorsport	Persona	I	10	(England) Daniel Welch	All	18th	72
2014	STP Racing with Sopp + Sopp	Welch Motorsport	Persona	I	12	(England) Daniel Welch	2–10	32nd	40
2014	STP Racing with Sopp + Sopp	Welch Motorsport	Persona	I	48	(United Kingdom) Ollie Jackson	All	28th	0

=== Renault ===
- 1993–1999
- 1993 Renault 19 16V Saloon
- 1994–1999 Renault Laguna
- 1993 Tim Harvey, Alain Menu
- 1994 Tim Harvey, Alain Menu
- 1995 Alain Menu, Will Hoy
- 1996 Alain Menu, Will Hoy
- 1997 Alain Menu, Jason Plato
- 1998 Alain Menu, Jason Plato
- 1999 Jason Plato, Jean-Christophe Boullion

=== SEAT ===
- 2004–2008
- 2004–2005 SEAT Toledo Cupra
- 2005–2007 SEAT Leon
- 2008 SEAT Leon TDI
- 2004 Jason Plato, Robert Huff
- 2005 Jason Plato, James Pickford, Luke Hines
- 2006 Jason Plato, James Thompson, Darren Turner
- 2007 Jason Plato, Darren Turner, Tom Coronel
- 2008 Jason Plato, Darren Turner

=== Toyota ===
- 1991–1995
- 1991–1993 Toyota Carina
- 1994–1995 Toyota Carina E
- 1991 Andy Rouse, Gary Ayles
- 1992 Will Hoy, Andy Rouse, Thorkild Thyrring, Julian Bailey
- 1993 Will Hoy, Julian Bailey
- 1994 Will Hoy, Julian Bailey, Tim Sugden
- 1995 Julian Bailey, Tim Sugden
- 2019 Toyota Corolla GT
- 2019 Tom Ingram

=== Vauxhall ===
- 1991–2009
- 1991–1992 Vauxhall Cavalier Gsi
- 1993–1995 Vauxhall Cavalier 16V
- 1996–2000 Vauxhall Vectra
- 2001–2004 Vauxhall Astra Coupe
- 2005–2006 Vauxhall Astra Sport Hatch
- 2007–2008 Vauxhall Vectra VXR
- 1991 John Cleland, Jeff Allam
- 1992 John Cleland, Jeff Allam
- 1993 John Cleland, Jeff Allam
- 1994 John Cleland, Jeff Allam
- 1995 John Cleland, James Thompson, Jeff Allam, Mikael Briggs
- 1996 John Cleland, James Thompson
- 1997 John Cleland, Derek Warwick
- 1998 John Cleland, Derek Warwick
- 1999 John Cleland, Yvan Muller
- 2000 Yvan Muller, Jason Plato, Vincent Radermecker
- 2001 Yvan Muller, Jason Plato
- 2002 Yvan Muller, James Thompson
- 2003 Yvan Muller, James Thompson, Paul O’Neill
- 2004 Yvan Muller, James Thompson, Luke Hines
- 2005 Yvan Muller, Colin Turkington, Gavin Smith
- 2006 Fabrizio Giovanardi, Tom Chilton, Gavin Smith, Erkut Kızılırmak
- 2007 Fabrizio Giovanardi, Tom Chilton, Alain Menu
- 2008 Fabrizio Giovanardi, Matt Neal, Tom Onslow-Cole
- 2009 Fabrizio Giovanardi, Matt Neal, Andrew Jordan
- 2017– Vauxhall Astra
- 2017 Tom Chilton, Senna Proctor, Robert Huff
- 2018 Senna Proctor, Josh Cook

=== Volvo ===
Year	Team entry	Team name	Model	Class	No.	Driver	Rounds	DC	Pts
1994	Volvo 850 Racing	Tom Walkinshaw Racing	850 SE/GLT	M	14	(Netherlands) Jan Lammers	All	15th	18
1994	Volvo 850 Racing	Tom Walkinshaw Racing	850 SE/GLT	M	15	(Sweden) Rickard Rydell	All	14th	27
1995	Volvo 850 Racing	Tom Walkinshaw Racing	850 20v	M	9	(United Kingdom) Tim Harvey	All	5th	176
1995	Volvo 850 Racing	Tom Walkinshaw Racing	850 20v	M	15	(Sweden) Rickard Rydell	All	3rd	255
1996	Volvo 850 Racing	Tom Walkinshaw Racing	850 20v	M	3	(Sweden) Rickard Rydell	All	3rd	194
1996	Volvo 850 Racing	Tom Walkinshaw Racing	850 20v	M	8	(United Kingdom) Kelvin Burt	1–5, 7–13	11th	66
1997	Volvo S40 Racing	Tom Walkinshaw Racing	S40	M	3	(Sweden) Rickard Rydell	All	4th	137
1997	Volvo S40 Racing	Tom Walkinshaw Racing	S40	M	11	(United Kingdom) Kelvin Burt	All	10th	60
1998	Volvo S40 Racing	Tom Walkinshaw Racing	S40	M	4	(Sweden) Rickard Rydell	All	1st	254
1998	Volvo S40 Racing	Tom Walkinshaw Racing	S40	M	14	(Italy) Gianni Morbidelli	All	11th	56
1999	Volvo S40 Racing	Tom Walkinshaw Racing	S40	M	1	(Sweden) Rickard Rydell	All	3rd	192
1999	Volvo S40 Racing	Tom Walkinshaw Racing	S40	M	11	(Belgium) Vincent Radermecker	All	8th	113

== Constructor representation ==
Manufacturer	1990's									2000's										2010's										2020's		
Manufacturer	91	92	93	94	95	96	97	98	99	00	01	02	03	04	05	06	07	08	09	10	11	12	13	14	15	16	17	18	19	20	21	22
(Italy) Alfa Romeo				155																												
(Germany) Audi						A4																										
(Germany) BMW	M3	3 Series																							1 Series				3 Series			
(United States) Chevrolet																				Cruze												
(United States) Ford	Sierra		Mondeo																Focus												Focus	
(Japan) Honda					Accord							Civic							Civic													Civic
(South Korea) Hyundai																																i30
(Japan) Infiniti																									Q50							
(Japan) Mazda		323	Xedos 6																													
(United Kingdom) MG											ZS												6									
(Japan) Mitsubishi	Galant																															
(Japan) Nissan	Primera																															
(France) Peugeot		405				406					406																					
(Malaysia) Proton												Impian																				
(France) Renault			19	Laguna																												
(Spain) SEAT														Toledo		Leon																
(Japan) Subaru																										Levorg						
(Japan) Toyota	Carina																												Corolla			
(United Kingdom) Vauxhall	Cavalier					Vectra					Astra						Vectra											Astra				
(Sweden) Volvo				850			S40																									
Manufacturer	91	92	93	94	95	96	97	98	99	00	01	02	03	04	05	06	07	08	09	10	11	12	13	14	15	16	17	18	19	20	21	22
Manufacturer	1990's									2000's										2010's										2020's		
