= Rory Butcher =

British racing driver (born 1987)

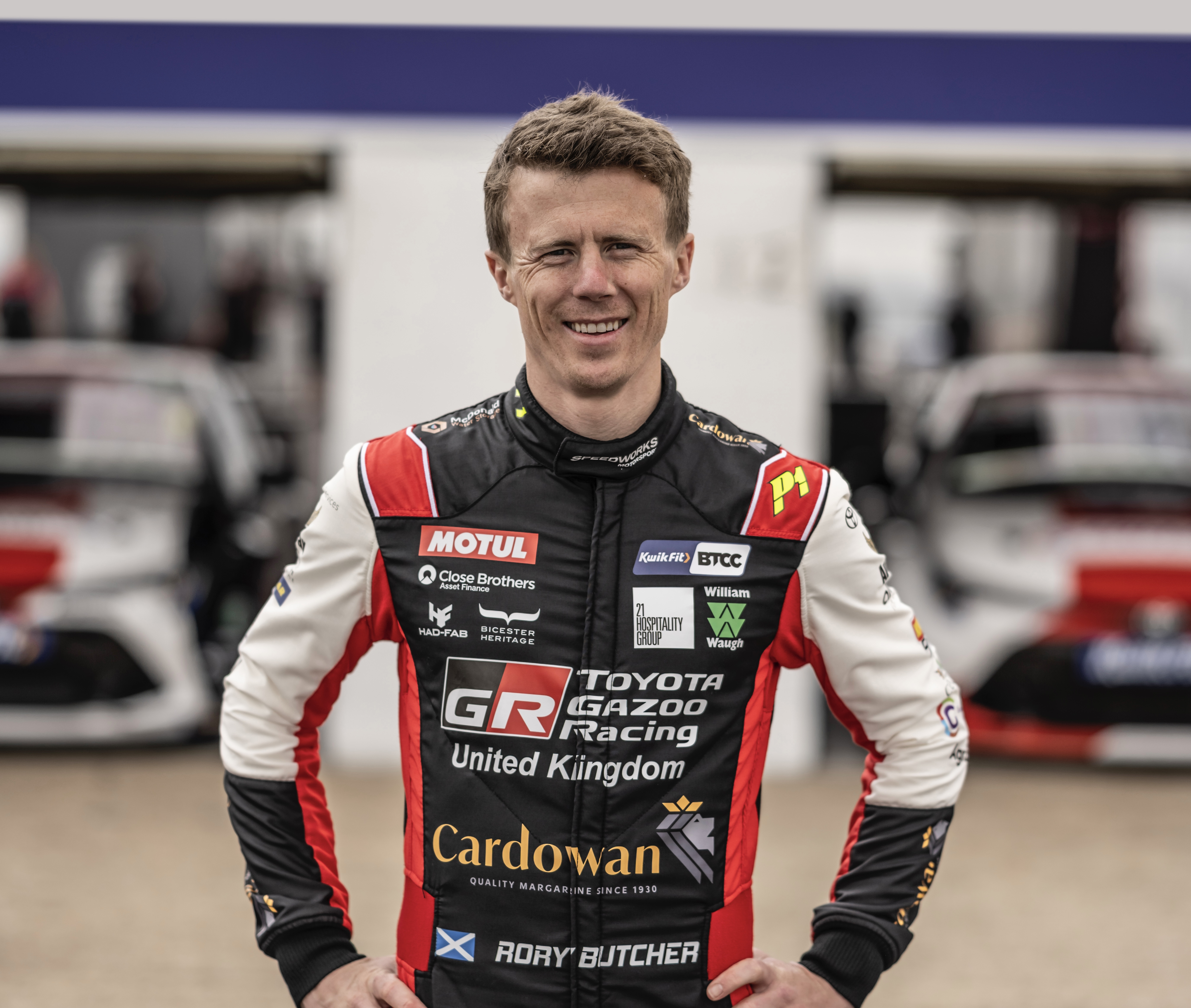
- Butcher in 2022
- Nationality: (United Kingdom) British
- Born: 16 March 1987 (age 39) Kirkcaldy, Scotland
- Relatives: Gordon Shedden (brother-in-law)

British Touring Car Championship career
- Debut season: 2017
- Current team: Toyota Gazoo Racing UK
- Categorisation: FIA Silver (until 2016); FIA Gold (2017–)
- Car number: 6
- Former teams: AmD Essex, Motorbase Performance
- Starts: 188 (189 entries)
- Wins: 11
- Podiums: 31
- Poles: 5
- Fastest laps: 8
- Best finish: 5th in 2019, 2020, 2022

Previous series
- 2016–18 2016–17 2015–17 2015 2015, 2017 2015 2012 2010, 2014–16 2010 2010 2009 2009 2009 2008, 2010–13 2007–09: 24H Series; VLN; European Le Mans Series; United SportsCar Championship; Blancpain Endurance Series; GT Cup; Porsche Supercup; British GT Championship; Benelux Formula Ford Championship; Scottish Mini Cooper Cup; British Formula Ford Championship; National Club Formula Ford; North West Club Formula Ford; Porsche Carrera Cup Great Britain; Scottish Formula Ford Championship

Championship titles
- 2019 2019 2009 2009: BTCC Independents' Trophy; Jack Sears Trophy; Formula Ford Festival – Kent class Scottish Formula Ford Championship

Rory Butcher (born 16 March 1987) is a Scottish racing driver who most recently competed in the 2023 British Touring Car Championship with Toyota Gazoo Racing UK. Butcher served as a NAPA Racing UK reserve driver and driver coach from 2024 to 2025 for BTCC driver Sam Osborne. He has also competed in several other series during his career, most notably the British GT Championship and the European Le Mans Series.

== Career ==
=== British Touring Car Championship ===
In 2017, Butcher joined the series from the Knockhill round in August, replacing Luke Davenport who was injured during the qualifying session for the earlier round at Croft.

== Personal life ==
Butcher's brother-in-law is Gordon Shedden, three-time champion in the British Touring Car Championship and World Touring Car Cup competitor. Aside from his racing career, Butcher is an instructor – like his brother-in-law – and the events operation manager at the Knockhill Racing Circuit, owned by his father Derek.

== Racing record ==
=== Complete British Touring Car Championship results ===
(key) (Races in bold indicate pole position – 1 point awarded just in first race; races in italics indicate fastest lap – 1 point awarded all races; * signifies that driver led race for at least one lap – 1 point given all races)

Year	Team	Car	1	2	3	4	5	6	7	8	9	10	11	12	13	14	15	16	17	18	19	20	21	22	23	24	25	26	27	28	29	30	DC	Points
2017	Team Shredded Wheat Racing with Duo	Ford Focus ST	BRH; 1	BRH; 2	BRH; 3	DON; 1	DON; 2	DON; 3	THR; 1	THR; 2	THR; 3	OUL; 1	OUL; 2	OUL; 3	CRO; 1	CRO; 2	CRO; 3	SNE; 1	SNE; 2	SNE; 3	KNO; 1; 25	KNO; 2; 9	KNO; 3; 9	ROC; 1; 25	ROC; 2; 19	ROC; 3; 14	SIL; 1; 20	SIL; 2; 19	SIL; 3 Ret	BRH; 1; 24	BRH; 2; 21	BRH; 3; 12	29th	20
2018	AmD with AutoAid RCIB Insurance Racing	MG 6 GT	BRH; 1; 13	BRH; 2; 9	BRH; 3; 6	DON; 1; 22	DON; 2; 9	**DON**; **3**; 13	THR; 1; 24	THR; 2; 19	THR; 3; 14	OUL; 1; 27	OUL; 2; 14	OUL; 3 Ret	CRO; 1; 13	CRO; 2; 10	CRO; 3; 13	SNE; 1 Ret	SNE; 2; 23	SNE; 3 Ret	ROC; 1; 9	ROC; 2; 8	ROC; 3; 6	KNO; 1; 10	KNO; 2; 7	KNO; 3; 7	SIL; 1; 12	SIL; 2; 16	SIL; 3 Ret	BRH; 1; 23	BRH; 2 Ret	BRH; 3; 24	17th	99
2019	Cobra Sport AmD AutoAid RCIB Insurance	Honda Civic Type R (FK2)	BRH; 1; 10	BRH; 2; 8	BRH; 3; 1	DON; 1; 11	DON; 2; 5	DON; 3; 4	THR; 1; 5	THR; 2; 7	THR; 3; 2	CRO; 1; 18	CRO; 2; 14	CRO; 3; 7	OUL; 1; 4	OUL; 2; 7	OUL; 3; 5	SNE; 1; 11	SNE; 2; 12	SNE; 3; 1*	THR; 1; 7	THR; 2; 14	THR; 3 DNS	**KNO**; **1**; 1*	**KNO**; **2**; 3	KNO; 3; 14	SIL; 1; 15	SIL; 2 Ret	SIL; 3; 16	BRH; 1; 4	BRH; 2; 9	BRH; 3; 2	5th	266
2020	Motorbase Performance	Ford Focus ST Mk.IV	DON; 1; 3	DON; 2; 2	DON; 3; 11	**BRH**; **1** Ret*	BRH; 2; 4	BRH; 3 Ret	**OUL**; **1**; 1*	**OUL**; **2**; 2*	OUL; 3; 8	KNO; 1; 5	KNO; 2; 10	KNO; 3; 1*	THR; 1; 6	THR; 2; 5	THR; 3; 3	SIL; 1; 3	SIL; 2; 14	SIL; 3 Ret	CRO; 1; 5	CRO; 2; 19	CRO; 3; 11	SNE; 1; 4	SNE; 2; 4	SNE; 3; 5	BRH; 1; 4	BRH; 2; 10	BRH; 3; 1*				5th	286
2021	Toyota Gazoo Racing UK	Toyota Corolla GR Sport	THR; 1; 5	THR; 2 Ret	THR; 3 Ret	SNE; 1; 3	SNE; 2; 5	SNE; 3; 6	BRH; 1; 15	BRH; 2; 14	BRH; 3; 7	OUL; 1; 4	OUL; 2; 1*	OUL; 3 Ret	KNO; 1; 9	KNO; 2 Ret	KNO; 3; 20	THR; 1; 4	THR; 2; 5	THR; 3; 6	CRO; 1; 19	CRO; 2 Ret	CRO; 3; 11	**SIL**; **1**; 1*	**SIL**; **2**; 1*	SIL; 3; 13	DON; 1; 3	DON; 2; 3*	DON; 3; 4	BRH; 1; 16	BRH; 2; 7	BRH; 3; 9	7th	247
2022	Toyota Gazoo Racing UK	Toyota Corolla GR Sport	DON; 1 Ret	DON; 2; 10	DON; 3; 7	BRH; 1; 7	BRH; 2; 3	BRH; 3; 5	THR; 1; 11	THR; 2; 13	THR; 3; 10	OUL; 1; 3	OUL; 2; 4	OUL; 3; 5	CRO; 1; 7	CRO; 2; 7	CRO; 3; 3	KNO; 1; 8	KNO; 2; 6	KNO; 3; 3	SNE; 1; 15	SNE; 2; 12	SNE; 3; 7	THR; 1; 6	THR; 2; 5	THR; 3; 4	**SIL**; **1**; 1*	**SIL**; **2**; 2*	SIL; 3; 3	BRH; 1; 2	BRH; 2; 4	BRH; 3; 3	5th	318
2023	Toyota Gazoo Racing UK	Toyota Corolla GR Sport	DON; 1; 11	DON; 2; 14	DON; 3; 11	BRH; 1; 7	BRH; 2; 6	BRH; 3 Ret	SNE; 1; 9	SNE; 2; 8	SNE; 3; 2	THR; 1; 7	THR; 2; 7	THR; 3; 7	OUL; 1; 16	OUL; 2; 10	OUL; 3; 10	CRO; 1; 25	CRO; 2; 18	CRO; 3; 8	KNO; 1 Ret	KNO; 2; 15	KNO; 3; 12	DON; 1; 11	DON; 2; 8	DON; 3; 1*	SIL; 1; 6	SIL; 2; 4	SIL; 3 Ret	BRH; 1; 23	BRH; 2; 19	BRH; 3; 15	10th	173

=== 24 Hours of Daytona results ===
Year	Team	Co-drivers	Car	Class	Laps	Pos.	Class Pos.
2015	(United States) GB Autosport	(United States) Michael Avenatti (Republic of Ireland) Damien Faulkner (Poland) Kuba Giermaziak (United States) Mike Skeen	Porsche 911 GT America	GTD	687	19th	7th

Sporting positions
Preceded by Tom Ingram	British Touring Car Championship; Independents' Trophy Winner; 2019	Succeeded by Ashley Sutton
Preceded by Dan Cammish	Jack Sears Trophy; Winner; 2019	Succeeded by Michael Crees
