= Kirkliston =

Coordinates: 55.956°N 3.403°W

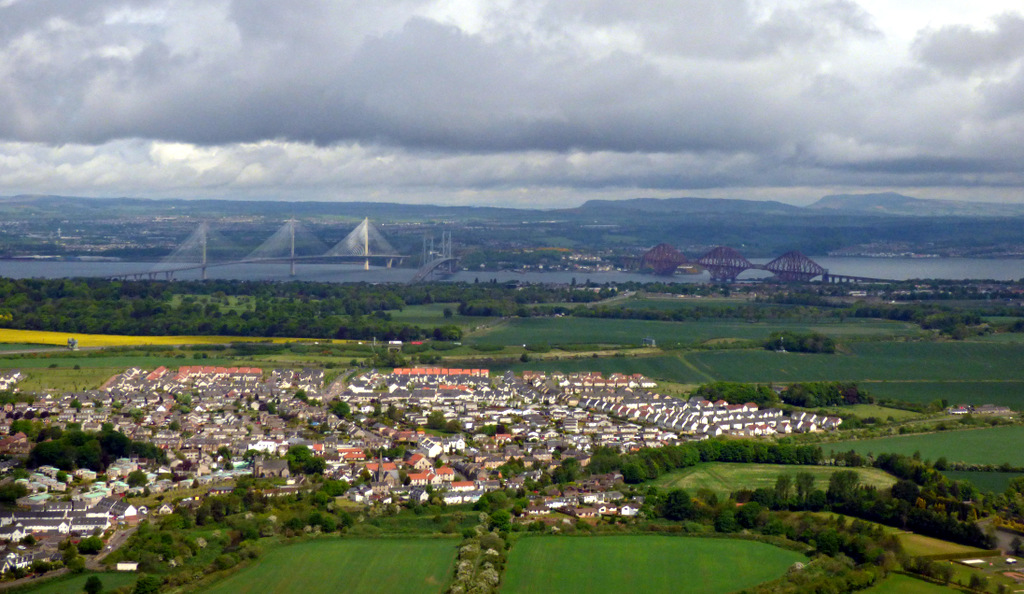
- Aerial view of Kirkliston, with the Forth bridges in the distance

- Location within Edinburgh
- Population: 5,280 (2020)
- Civil parish: Kirkliston
- Council area: Edinburgh
- Lieutenancy area: City of Edinburgh
- Country: Scotland
- Sovereign state: United Kingdom
- Post town: KIRKLISTON
- Postcode district: EH29
- Dialling code: 0131
- Police: Scotland
- Fire: Scottish
- Ambulance: Scottish
- UK Parliament: Edinburgh West
- Scottish Parliament: Edinburgh Western

Kirkliston is a village and parish to the west of Edinburgh, Scotland, historically within the county of West Lothian but now within the City of Edinburgh council area limits. It lies on high ground immediately north of a northward loop of the Almond, on the old road between Edinburgh and Linlithgow (formerly the A9, now the B9080 and cut off by Edinburgh Airport), having a crossroads with the road from Newbridge to Queensferry and beyond to Fife (the B800). The B800 is variously named Path Brae, High Street, Station Road, and Queensferry Road as it passes through the town. The B9080 is named Main Street and Stirling Road as it passes through.

== History ==
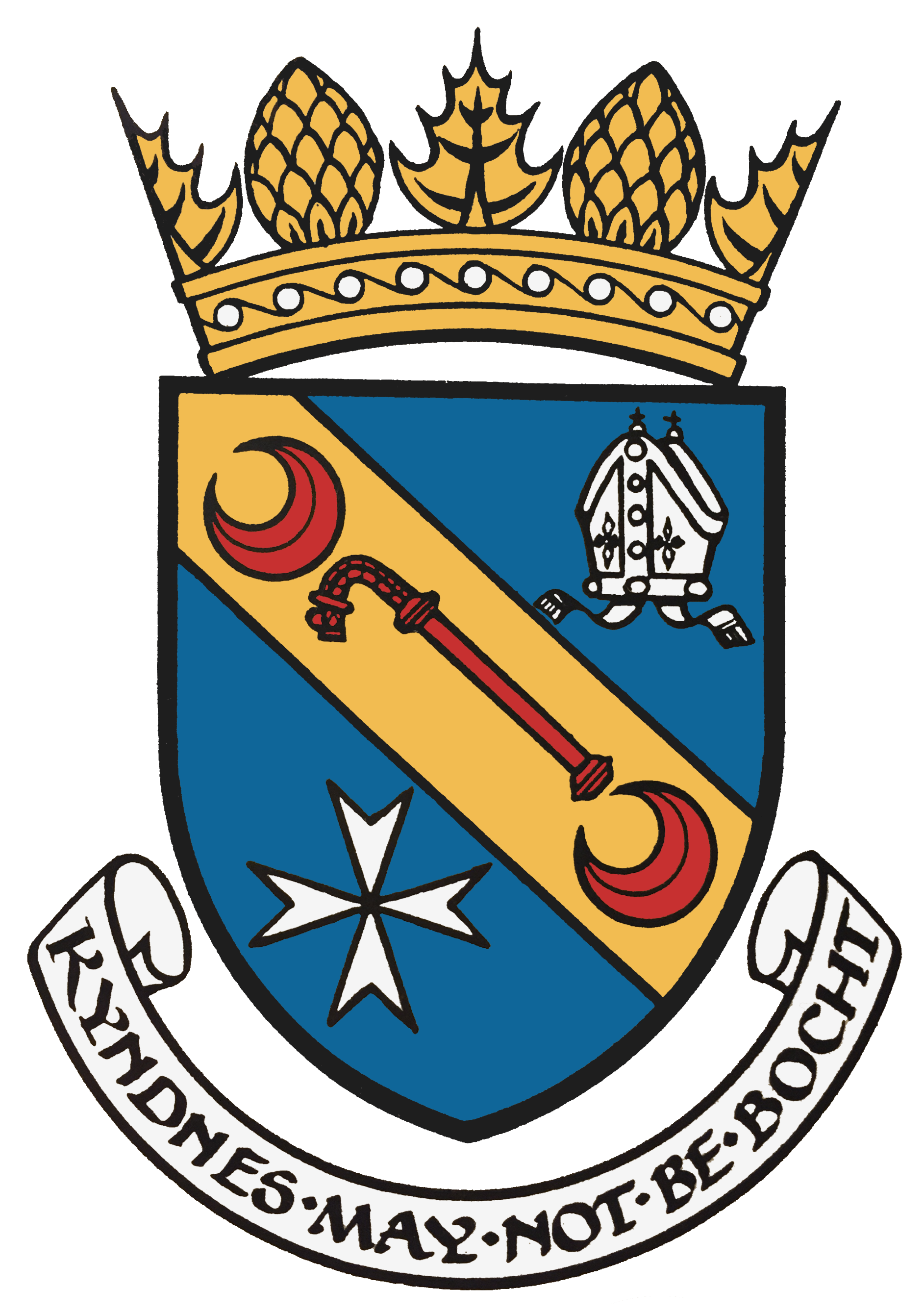
Arms of Kirkliston Community Council

The ancient name of the village was Liston, which may be derived from the Brittonic llys, meaning court or palace, and the Old English tun, meaning farmstead. Alternatively, the first element may be an Old English personal name, Lissa. Britons would have been the earliest inhabitants of the area, with Angles later arriving from Northumberland. In the 13th century the name was recorded as Temple Liston, referring to the Knights Templar, who possessed the Barony of Liston at the heart of the parish. The prefix Kirk (church) first appears in the 14th century, after the Knights Templar had been disbanded and their lands given to the Knights Hospitaller. The Hospitallers are commemorated by the Maltese Cross in the arms of the community council, which were granted in 1991.

Kirkliston was the location of the first recorded parliament in Scottish history; the Estates of Scotland met there in 1235, during the reign of Alexander II. In June 1298 Edward Longshanks made camp at the village on his way to fight Sir William Wallace at the Battle of Falkirk. Tradition states that he planted his standard at Greig's Hill, now within the Gateside housing estate. Archaeological digs in the area have uncovered evidence of the camp, most recently in 2005. A violent quarrel broke out in the camp between Edward's English and Welsh forces, and eighteen ecclesiastics were killed. Clerics' Hill is named in commemoration of them. When the Welshmen announced their intention to defect to the Scots, Edward replied, "Let my enemies go and join my enemies; I trust that in one day I shall chastise them all."

The barony of Kirkliston, including the village, church, mill, glebe, and demesne, was acquired by the Archbishop of St Andrews in the 15th century. Kirkliston became the site of the court from which the archbishop's lands south of the Forth were administrated, a fact commemorated by the mitre and crozier in the council arms. The Setons of Niddry, whose symbol, a red crescent on gold, is also represented, were hereditary bailies of the barony. The court hall, situated at the head of The Square, became the village school before being demolished in the 1930s.

In July 1543, there was controversy about a plan for Mary, Queen of Scots to marry Prince Edward of England. The two sides met for negotiations at Kirkliston and held a peace making ceremony in the fields.

The oldest house in the town is Castle House, which has a marriage stone dated 1682. Robert Burns stayed there in the summer of 1787 and inscribed this verse on a window pane, now in a Vancouver museum:

The ants about their clod employ their care,
And think the business of the world is theirs;
Lo: Waxen combs seem palaces to bees.
And mites conceive the world to be a cheese.

The eastern section of the Main Street was added as a toll road to Linlithgow around 1800 and buildings developed along it from that time.

The construction of a M9 Spur extension in 2003 led to the excavation of a 19th-century terraced cottages by CFA Archaeology. The results shed light the cramped and unsanitary conditions that large families lived in at that time and that the houses were cheaply built, poorly maintained and overcrowded throughout much of their existence.

The memorial on the northeast corner of the crossroads was built in 1920 to the memory of the men who died in the war.

Until May 1975 Kirkliston was within the old county of West Lothian. Under the Local Government (Scotland) Act 1973 it then became part of the Lothian Region and the City of Edinburgh District. Further local government reorganisation saw the town become part of the City of Edinburgh Council area in 1996. Edinburgh Council has a small office in the local library, as well as running the library, primary school, and leisure centre.

From 1959 to 2001, Kirkliston was the site of the Drambuie liqueur factory. There had also been a whisky distillery in the south of the town since 1795, which in later years this became a malt factory. The distillery contained a tower-style patent still house, one of only two in Scotland, which housed a Coffey still. Both factories have been demolished, although the original patent still house remains and has been converted to housing.

== Parish church ==
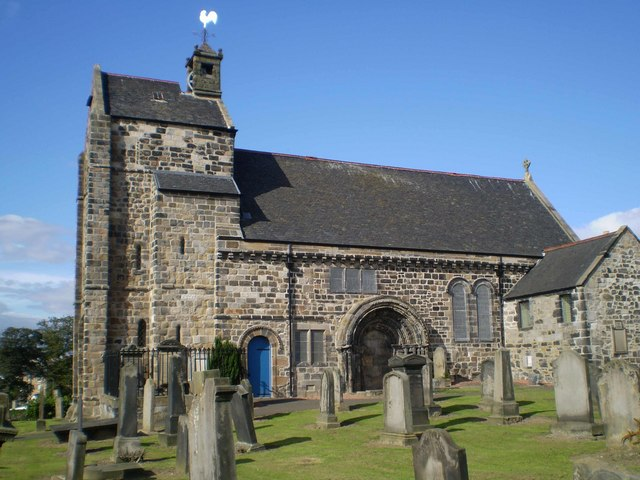
Kirkliston Parish Church

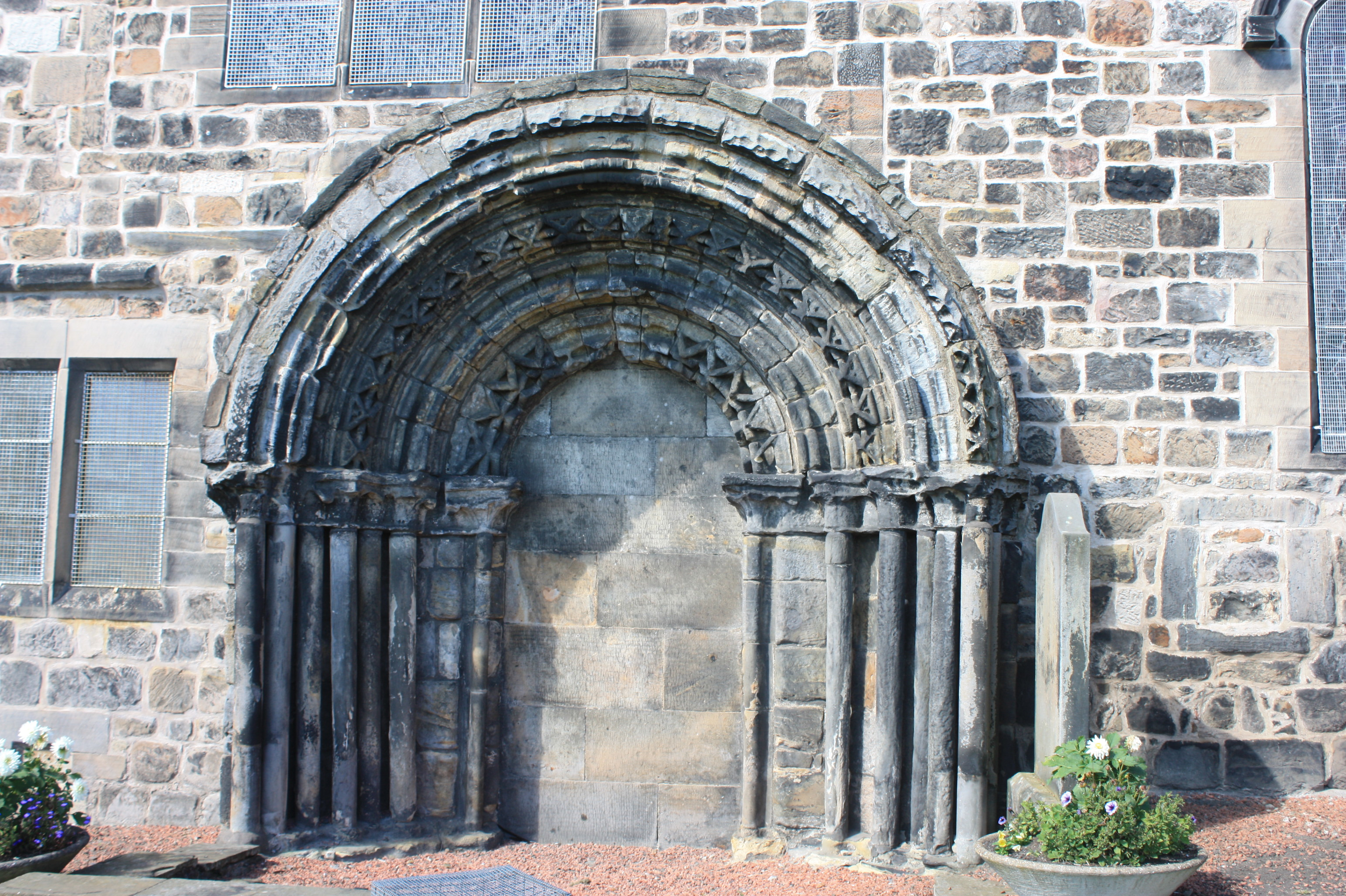
The 12th-century south door

The oldest surviving building in Kirkliston is the kirk for which the town is named. Its elevated position raises it to a position of great prominence in the local topography. The mound it sits upon is partly natural and partly a burial mound upon which the church has been superimposed.

The church's "Norman Transitional" architecture indicates that it was built around 1200. It was dedicated on 11 September 1244 by David de Bernham, Bishop of St Andrews, but the patron saint is not recorded. It may be one of the saints commemorated in the names of two ancient local fairs, St Symon & St Jude's and St Margaret's. These were discontinued in the 19th century, but there is now an annual "gala day", a festival in which a local girl is crowned as the "gala queen". At one time the church belonged to the Knights Templar and the town was called Temple Liston.

The south doorway is the most significant part of the building, being an excellent example of a Romanesque style arched entrance, typical of the late 12th century, with multiple concentric geometric and sculpted forms in each curve. It was bricked up in the 1822 remodelling carried out by Sir Robert Rowand Anderson, and the old north doorway, more restrained in design, was moved to the eastern wall to become the main entrance.

The projecting wing on the church's southeast, the Stair Aisle, in which the lairds of Newliston and their families are interred, was added in the early 17th century. A lintel above its door bears the Latin for "it is proper to trust in virtue, not in lineage" with the date 1629 and the initials of John Dundas of Newliston and his wife Margaret Crichton.

The church contains a copy of the 1643 Solemn League and Covenant, signed by the minister, the session clerk (John Brooke), and 310 parishioners. It is displayed on the east wall of the nave.

Kirkliston Parish Church is a congregation of the Church of Scotland (within the Presbytery of Edinburgh). Kirkliston parish also includes the neighbouring community of Newbridge. The Reverend Erick du Toit became its minister in December 2020.

The oldest stone in the graveyard is dated 1545. A curious gravestone features two carved heads wearing spectacles; its date of 1727 possible makes it the world's oldest depiction of glasses with sides.

The original graveyard lies largely to the south of the church, but was extended as a more formal cemetery on sloping ground to the west. Unusually for towns, the much later Kirkliston Cemetery (begun in 1928) has squeezed into a site northeast of the church on the site of the former manse and garden, rather than lying on the outskirts. Two of the graves are of the Earl of Stair and his grandmother, Dame Margaret on whom Lady Ashton was based in one of Sir Walter Scott's Waverly Novels "The Bride of the Lammermuirs."

== Free church ==
The Kirkliston Free Church was opened on 30 September 1843, with its founding stone laid by Thomas Chalmers. Its tall stone spire (added by Hippolyte Blanc in 1880) means it also has a commanding role in the local landscape. It closed as a church in 1945, and is now used by the parish church as a church hall.

== Notable people ==
- Marion Bryce (1839-1920), Canadian educator and community leader; born in Kirkliston
- Very Rev James Chalmers Burns (1809-1892) Free Church minister of Kirkliston, Moderator of the General Assembly of the Free Church 1879/80.
- Rev Alexander Masson (1845-1934) minister of the parish church from 1879 to 1923 (44 years).
- John Murray (1841–1914), marine biologist and oceanographer, died in Kirkliston
- Ian Forrest (born 1950) racing driver
- Stephen Hendry (born 1969), seven time World Snooker Champion, briefly lived in the village in 1984

== Conservation area ==
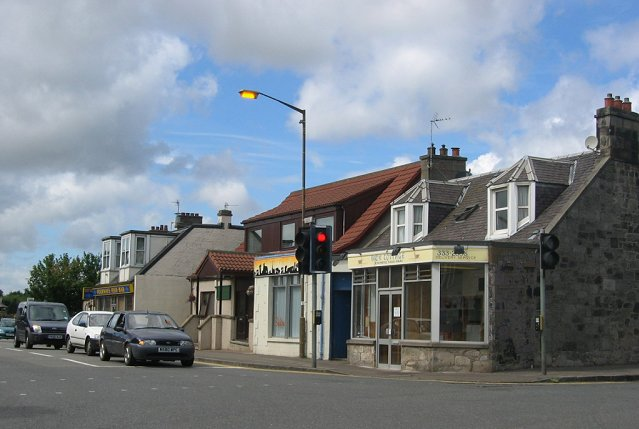
At the crossroads

Kirkliston was designated a conservation area on 13 October 1977. The conservation area all lies south of the main crossroads and Main Street. Although Main Street is not included in the conservation area, the Conservation Area Character Appraisal recognises that boundary changes to include parts of Main Street would help to preserve the townscape.

It focuses on the Parish Church, The Square and the High Street but also stretches south down to encompass the remote manse and the little group of buildings at Breastmill (1672).

Its boundary splits the now largely demolished distillery site and it is recognised that inclusion of the entire site would help to control redevelopment.

The boundary encompasses the River Almond as it passes the town leading to the net area of the conservation area being primarily open space rather than buildings.

== "Cheesetown" ==
Locally Kirkliston is often known as "Cheesetown", a name first recorded in print in 1902. A suggested origin is the Burns verse given above, but the most widely used explanation is that when the Forth Bridge was being built, the workers who lodged in Kirkliston often had cheese sandwiches for lunch. The town is also often called "Kirky".

== Transport ==
=== Road ===
Although a major motorway interchange (M9 J1A / M90 south termination) is situated immediately to the west of Kirkliston and named after the town, there is no direct access onto the network at that location – the nearest is the M9 J1 at Newbridge approximately 2 miles (3.2 km) to the south via the B800.

=== Rail ===
Until 1930, Kirkliston had its own railway station, built by the North British Railway. The station was located on a branch line from "Queensferry Junction" (near Ratho on the Edinburgh-Glasgow main line) to Dalmeny, which was opened in 1866. The line was extended from Dalmeny to Queensferry and Port Edgar a few years later.

Kirkliston Station was closed to passengers by the London and North Eastern Railway in 1930. Freight trains through Kirkliston ended in 1966 following the Beeching cuts, and the railway track was subsequently removed. There are still references to the station in the name of two streets. The old railway line has been converted into a cycle path.

=== Bus ===
Kirkliston is served by 6 bus services operated by Lothian Buses, Stagecoach South Scotland & McGill's Scotland East:

- 71 - Queensferry - Kirkliston - Newbridge - Ratho Station - Gyle Centre (Lothiancountry)
- 72 - Fauldhouse - Whitburn - Livingston - Broxburn - Winchburgh - Kirkliston (Lothiancountry)
- X19 - Winchburgh - Kirkliston - Newbridge - Ratho Station - Edinburgh (Lothiancountry)
- X38 - Falkirk - Polmont - Linlithgow - Kirkliston - Newbridge - Edinburgh (McGill's Scotland East)
- X51 - Dunfermline - Rosyth - Kirkliston - Livingston (Stagecoach South Scotland)
- N43 - Edinburgh - Queensferry - Kirkliston - Winchburgh - Broxburn - Dechmont (Lothiancountry Night Service)

In June 2014, Lothian Buses introduced the 63 bus which runs from Heriot Watt via the Gyle, Newbridge, Kirkliston, and onwards to Queensferry. In September 2020, the route was transferred to First, extending the route to Balerno. In 2022 this route was transferred to McGill's along with service X38.

In November 2019 Lothian Buses introduced the X38 service running from Linlithgow to town. The Lothian X38 was withdrawn in early 2020 due to the COVID-19 pandemic and later permanently withdrawn leaving Kirkliston out of the Lothian network. In October 2023 Lothian Country introduced Service 72 operating between Kirkliston and Livingston Centre Via Winchburgh, Broxburn, Uphall & St John's Hospital.

Stagecoach South Scotland's Service X51 calls at Kirkliston operating between Dunfermline Bus Station and Livingston Centre via Rosyth, Ferrytoll Park & Ride and the Livingston Fastlink.
