= 1992 British Touring Car Championship =

35th season of the British Touring Car Championship

1992 BTCC season

Seasons
- ← 1991 1993 →

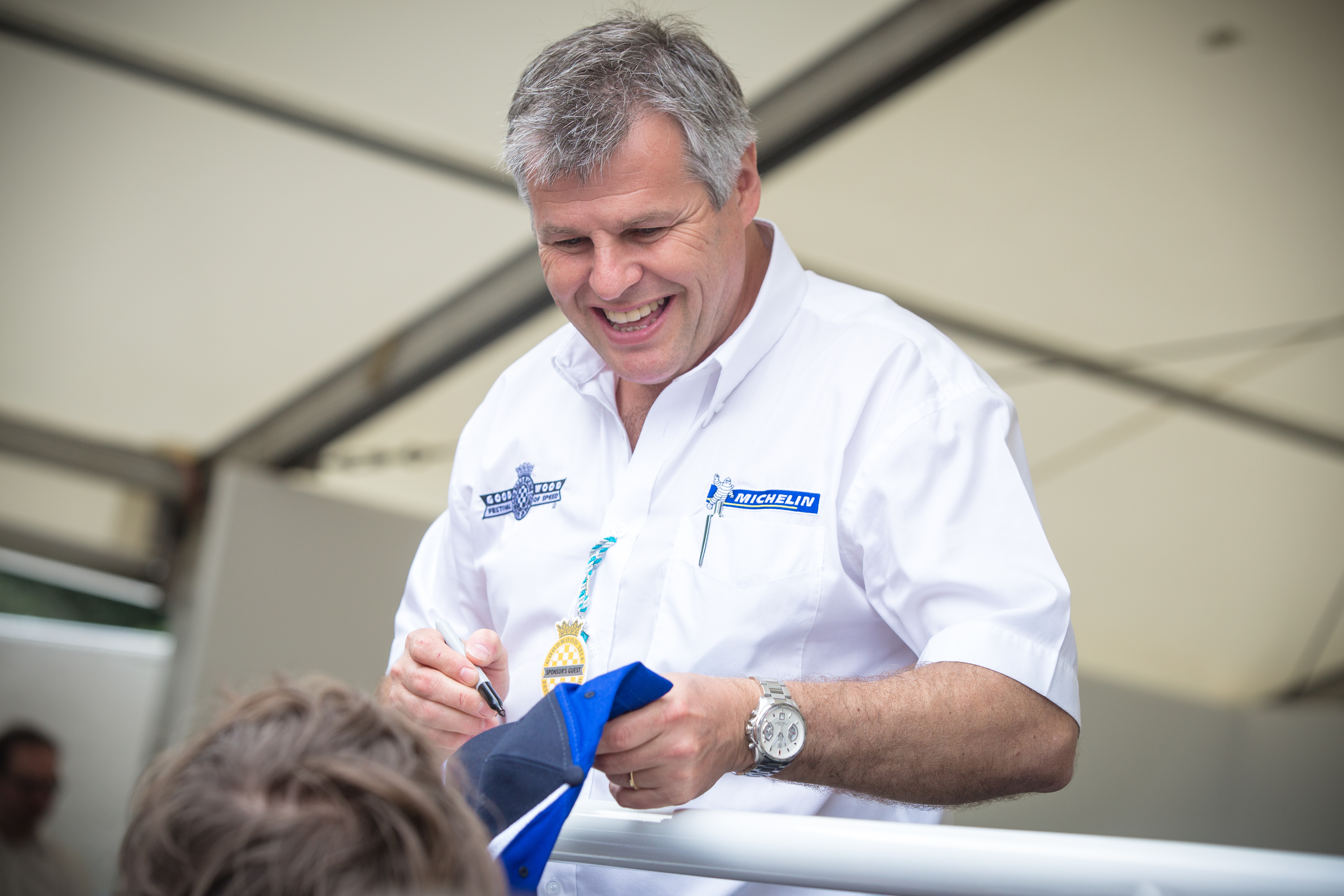
Tim Harvey, the 1992 British Touring Car Champion.

The 1992 Esso RAC British Touring Car Championship season was the 35th British Touring Car Championship (BTCC) season. The drivers championship was won by British driver Tim Harvey in a BMW 318iS following a dramatic final race of the season. The manufacturers championship won by Vauxhall, and the TOCA Challenge Cup for Privateers was won by British driver James Kaye in a Toyota Carina.

== Changes for 1992 ==
- The championship branched out from England to include one round in Scotland (held at Knockhill) and one in Wales (held at Pembrey)
- A new team had considered running a Citroën BX in 1992, but the project never came to fruition.

== Season summary ==
The 1992 British Touring Car Championship began at Silverstone where stringent winter testing appeared to have paid off for Vauxhall as John Cleland dominated the proceedings, taking with him the victory and a new lap record. Cleland would also win the second round, held at Thruxton, ahead of works Toyota driver Andy Rouse. Champion manufacturer BMW meanwhile struggled with their new 318iS (which used a variant of the E30 M3 S14 engine in 2.0 size) model. The works Prodrive cars were driven by Tim Sugden and former Formula 3000 driver Alain Menu, while the semi-works Vic Lee-run team entered Tim Harvey, Ray Bellm and Steve Soper. Soper, however, would again miss several rounds due to his clashing commitments in the German DTM championship.

At the next round at Oulton Park John Cleland held the lead ahead of the works Toyota pair of Will Hoy and Andy Rouse when he went off on the first lap with cold tyres which contributed to his car handling poorly, dropping several places and promoting the Toyotas into the lead. Hoy then slowed temporarily with a mysterious electrical problem and lost the lead to Rouse, but was soon able to reclaim it. Rouse then took back the lead and held it for a lap, after which Hoy again claimed the lead of the race. The electrical problem then struck again for Hoy, allowing Rouse to re-take the lead and win the race. With Cleland finishing in 11th Rouse now led the championship from Cleland after a win and two second places in the first three races.

At round four at Snetterton Hoy led from lights to flag, finishing ahead of John Cleland and Alain Menu, who took BMW's first podium of the season. Brands Hatch hosted the fifth round of the championship, and here Toyota's championship challenge would be severely dented. Hoy had taken an early lead ahead of Rouse and Cleland, but the Vauxhall driver was soon able to pass Rouse and put Hoy under pressure. At Surtees corner on the second lap, Hoy buckled under pressure when he missed a gear, allowing Cleland to take the lead. Suddenly, as the Toyotas began to chase Cleland round Westfield corner, both of them collided and veered into the barrier at full speed, both Toyotas were wrecked and out of the running, both Rouse and Hoy's enthusiasm to catch Cleland had got the better of them and the race was handed to the Vauxhall on a plate. Cleland won with ease with team-mate Jeff Allam in second and Steve Soper in third, who had come up from last place after being forced to start in the pit lane.

The first double-header of the season took place at Donington Park with Will Hoy putting the misery of Brands Hatch behind him to record a dominant win in the first race, with Cleland in second after a daring move on Andy Rouse at Goddards corner in the closing stages of the race.
After a ten-minute break, the second race began in chaos as the fast moving Peugeot 405 of Robb Gravett lost control and hit the pit wall, taking Jeff Allam and Rouse out with him in the process. Tim Harvey took advantage of an error by Cleland at the Old Hairpin to put the pressure on the Vauxhall, but while the two were dueling, race one winner Hoy and the Vauxhall of David Leslie joined in the battle for the lead, with Leslie initially leading before Hoy nipped past at the Esses, with Harvey following through. On the sixth lap, Harvey took the lead under braking at the Melbourne hairpin and stayed there despite the best efforts of the reigning champion.

Cleland finished fourth to add to his championship lead, he was on 104 points, while race winner Harvey was far behind in fifth place and only on 39 points. Cleland, Hoy, Rouse and Allam looked like they were the four to battle it out for the crown.

At Silverstone for the British Grand Prix support race, and round 8 of the championship saw Jeff Allam stake a claim for the championship with his first win for Vauxhall. Allam made his move on team-mate Cleland at Becketts to take the lead and win, a struggling Cleland eventually finished third behind Hoy. Allam's victory had moved him into third place in the championship after Andy Rouse was plagued by engine problems early in the race.

The Knockhill circuit played host to its first BTCC rounds, though heavy rain was to spoil the parade, the event was to prove memorable. Future WRC champion Colin McRae made a guest appearance for BMW, finishing eighth in race one before being disqualified in the second race for a dangerous overtaking manoeuvre on the BMW M3 of Matt Neal. McRae's BMW team-mate for the event, Alain Menu did not start at all after breaking his leg when he fell off a paddock quad bike after qualifying had taken place, his place for the rest of the season was taken by Kris Nissen.

David Leslie led away, but was soon under pressure from the fellow Vauxhall of Jeff Allam, the works Vauxhall of the Silverstone winner was handling better and an uncharacteristic error from Leslie allowed Allam to take the lead and win the race ahead of Tim Harvey and Andy Rouse. Cleland would later be disqualified from race 1 after ignoring a black flag for a loose bumper. Harvey then won the second race ahead of Allam and Cleland.

Pembrey's first BTCC race saw Harvey first take the pole and then lead the race from start to finish in damp conditions. Teammate Steve Soper put Harvey under pressure but could not find a way past and finished second, while Tim Sugden was a distant third. By now Andy Rouse had pretty much dropped out of contention for the title and would focus on supporting teammate Will Hoy's championship bid. The fight for the title now appeared to stand between Hoy, Vauxhall teammates Cleland and Allam, and Tim Harvey, who was backed up by teammate Steve Soper. Soper now had no more clashing commitments in Germany and would start in all of the remaining rounds of the season.

Brands Hatch hosted rounds twelve and thirteen, second double header meeting of the season. The first race started off with a close battle between all of the championship protagonists, Soper leading Harvey in a BMW one-two ahead of Will Hoy, Andy Rouse and the Vauxhall pair of Cleland and Allam. Hoy managed to get past Harvey and attacked Soper for the lead on the outside of Druids, but the unwise move caused him to drop back to third. Soper then started trailing smoke and allowed Harvey past up into the lead, but then moved over to block Hoy. Soper was eventually forced to retire, but when he finally did so Harvey had a substantial gap on the rest of the field, taking the first win of the day. Hoy finished second ahead of Cleland and Allam.

Harvey was then on pole for the second race, and won it ahead of Hoy by a much smaller margin than in the first race, while Cleland took third. Round 14 at Donington Park was dominated by the two Vic Lee Motorsport drivers, Soper shadowing Harvey to the flag with Cleland again in third place. Only a single point now separated Harvey and Cleland ahead of the final meeting at Silverstone. Allam had not been able to deliver the results to stay in the championship hunt, but Will Hoy still had a chance to take the title.

The qualifying ahead of the final round was surprisingly top-heavy with support drivers. Andy Rouse took pole position, Jeff Allam second, third Toyota driver Julian Bailey third and Steve Soper fourth. Championship contenders Cleland, Hoy and Harvey started seventh, ninth and twelfth respectively. Hoy and Harvey both started well, with Hoy passing Cleland on the first lap. Steve Soper in fourth then attempted to pass Vauxhall driver David Leslie for third, but the two made contact and Soper spun out. Soper's car was collected by Rob Gravett, and while Soper was able to rejoin in last place his BMW had taken heavy damage to the rear.

Later in the race Hoy, Harvey and Cleland all followed each other in fourth, fifth and sixth place. Soper had surged up the field to seventh and seemed to have an incredible pace considering the damage on his car. Two laps from the finish Harvey attacked Hoy into Copse, and the two were side by side through the corner with Harvey on the inside. At the exit of the corner Harvey drifted wide, putting himself on the kerb and Hoy on the grass. This allowed both Cleland and Soper to pass the pair: the order was now Cleland in fourth (which would give him the championship), Soper fifth, Harvey sixth and Hoy seventh. Soon thereafter Soper moved past Cleland into fourth at the entry of Club, putting Cleland in a BMW sandwich. On the run down to Abbey Cleland could be seen with the Vauxhall's onboard camera giving the finger to Soper.

Exiting from Abbey Cleland moved to the left of the track in an attempt to set himself up for a pass on the outside of Bridge. Harvey meanwhile got a good exit out of Abbey and moved up on the right side of Cleland. Cleland moved over to defend, but Harvey managed to pass him on the inside of Bridge. Soper now immediately jumped out of the way, promoting Harvey to fourth, and then moved in behind Harvey to defend him against Cleland. The three cars went through Priory nose to tail, but going into Brooklands Cleland dived inside Soper for fifth. Soper closed the door and the two cars made contact, the Vauxhall going up on two wheels, and the cars exited Brooklands with Cleland half a car length ahead of Soper. Into Luffield Soper dived on the inside of Cleland using the grass, and the two cars again made contact and spun out into the barriers. Both Soper and Cleland were forced to retire on the spot.

With only a lap remaining Harvey could now cruise to fourth and the championship title, Hoy finishing three seconds behind in fifth place. Up front Andy Rouse only just claimed the win a tenth of a second ahead of Jeff Allam and seven tenths ahead of David Leslie in third.

This was one of the most controversial moments in BTCC history; commenting on the move by Soper which had cost him the title, a dejected Cleland famously remarked "The man's an animal!" Harvey won the title on 152 points, three points ahead of Will Hoy on 149 and seven ahead of Cleland on 145. Jeff Allam ended up fourth on 137, and Andy Rouse fifth on 128.

There was some consolation for Cleland, as he won the TOCA shootout, held at Donington Park on 1 November. The race is best remembered for Kieth O'Dor's spectacular crash at Old Hairpin when his Nissan Primera went out of control and somersaulted over the catch fencing. Cleland took the flag from Rob Gravett, David Leslie and Ian Flux to win the £12000 top prize.

== Teams and drivers ==
=== BTCC ===
Team	Car	No.	Drivers	Rounds
Manufacturers
(Japan) Team Securicor ICS Toyota	Toyota Carina	1	(United Kingdom) Will Hoy	All
(Japan) Team Securicor ICS Toyota	Toyota Carina	3	(United Kingdom) Andy Rouse	All
(Japan) Team Securicor ICS Toyota	Toyota Carina	14	(Denmark) Thorkild Thyrring	1–6
(Japan) Team Securicor ICS Toyota	Toyota Carina	14	(United Kingdom) Julian Bailey	10–12
(United Kingdom) Vauxhall Sport	Vauxhall Cavalier	2	(United Kingdom) John Cleland	All
(United Kingdom) Vauxhall Sport	Vauxhall Cavalier	6	(United Kingdom) Jeff Allam	All
(Germany) M Team Shell Racing with Listerine	BMW 318is	4	(United Kingdom) Steve Soper	2–3, 5–6, 8–12
(Germany) M Team Shell Racing with Listerine	BMW 318is	5	(United Kingdom) Ray Bellm	1–9
(Germany) M Team Shell Racing with Listerine	BMW 318is	8	(United Kingdom) Tim Harvey	All
(United Kingdom) M Team Mobil	BMW 318is	10	(United Kingdom) Tim Sugden	All
(United Kingdom) M Team Mobil	BMW 318is	30	(Switzerland) Alain Menu	1–8
(United Kingdom) M Team Mobil	BMW 318is	30	(Denmark) Kris Nissen	9–12
(United Kingdom) M Team Mobil	BMW 318is	50	(United Kingdom) Colin McRae	8
(Japan) Nissan Janspeed Racing	Nissan Primera eGT	23	(United Kingdom) Kieth O'dor	All
(Japan) Nissan Janspeed Racing	Nissan Primera eGT	24	(United Kingdom) Andy Middlehurst	1–9
(Japan) Nissan Janspeed Racing	Nissan Primera eGT	24	(United Kingdom) James Weaver	10–12
(Japan) Nissan Janspeed Racing	Nissan Primera eGT	34	(United Kingdom) Tiff Needell	12
(Japan) Shell Mazda Racing Team	Mazda 323F	32	(United Kingdom) Patrick Watts	All
(France) Peugeot Talbot Sport	Peugeot 405 Mi16	45	(United Kingdom) Robb Gravett	1-7, 9-12
(France) Peugeot Talbot Sport	Peugeot 405 Mi16	46	(United Kingdom) Ian Flux	12
(Italy) Peugeot Italia Team	Peugeot 405 Mi16	46	(United Kingdom) Gary Ayles	11
(United Kingdom) Ecurie Ecosse Vauxhall	Vauxhall Cavalier	78	(United Kingdom) Bobby Verdon-Roe	1–8
(United Kingdom) Ecurie Ecosse Vauxhall	Vauxhall Cavalier	78	(United Kingdom) Alex Portman	9–12
(United Kingdom) Ecurie Ecosse Vauxhall	Vauxhall Cavalier	79	(United Kingdom) David Leslie	All
Independents
(United Kingdom) Park Lane Racing	Toyota Carina	11	(United Kingdom) James Kaye	All
(United Kingdom) Rimstock Racing	BMW M3	12	(United Kingdom) Matt Neal	1–11
(United Kingdom) Rimstock Racing	BMW 318is	12	(United Kingdom) Matt Neal	12
(United Kingdom) Bristow Motorsport	BMW M3	15	(United Kingdom) Laurence Bristow	1, 7, 9
(United Kingdom) Judge Developments	Ford Sierra RS Cosworth	16	(United Kingdom) Dennis Leech	7, 9–12
(United Kingdom) Roy Kennedy Racing	BMW M3	17	(United Kingdom) Ian Flux	1–3, 7
(United Kingdom) Techspeed Racing	BMW M3	20	(United Kingdom) Sean Walker	1–7, 9–12
(United Kingdom) Techspeed Racing	BMW M3	22	(United Kingdom) Karl Jones	1–8
(United Kingdom) Techspeed Racing	BMW M3	22	(United Kingdom) Alistair Lyall	12
(United Kingdom) Techspeed Racing	BMW M3	33	(United Kingdom) Guy Povey	1
(United Kingdom) Ian Forrest Racing	BMW M3	25	(United Kingdom) Ian Forrest	8, 12

=== ToCA Shootout ===
Team	Car	No.	Drivers
Manufacturers
Vauxhall Sport	Vauxhall Cavalier	2	(United Kingdom) John Cleland
Vauxhall Sport	Vauxhall Cavalier	6	(United Kingdom) Jeff Allam
Team Securicor ICS Toyota	Toyota Carina	3	(United Kingdom) Andy Rouse
Nissan Janspeed Racing	Nissan Primera eGT	23	(United Kingdom) Kieth O'dor
Peugeot Talbot Sport	Peugeot 405 Mi16	45	(United Kingdom) Robb Gravett
Peugeot Talbot Sport	Peugeot 405 Mi16	46	(United Kingdom) Ian Flux
Ecurie Ecosse Vauxhall	Vauxhall Cavalier	78	(United Kingdom) Alex Portman
Ecurie Ecosse Vauxhall	Vauxhall Cavalier	79	(United Kingdom) David Leslie
Independents
Park Lane Racing	Toyota Carina	11	(United Kingdom) James Kaye
Rimstock Racing	BMW 318is	12	(United Kingdom) Matt Neal
Judge Developments	Ford Sierra RS Cosworth	16	(United Kingdom) Dennis Leech

== Race calendar and winners ==
All races were held in Great Britain.

Round		Circuit	Date	Pole position	Fastest lap	Winning driver	Winning team	Winning privateer
1	R1	Silverstone Circuit (National)	5 April	(United Kingdom) John Cleland	(United Kingdom) John Cleland	(United Kingdom) John Cleland	Vauxhall Sport	(United Kingdom) Ian Flux
2	R2	Thruxton	20 April	(United Kingdom) John Cleland	(United Kingdom) Jeff Allam	(United Kingdom) John Cleland	Vauxhall Sport	(United Kingdom) Ian Flux
3	R3	Oulton Park (International)	4 May	(United Kingdom) Will Hoy	(United Kingdom) Will Hoy	(United Kingdom) Andy Rouse	Team Securicor ICS Toyota	(United Kingdom) James Kaye
4	R4	Snetterton Circuit	24 May	(United Kingdom) Will Hoy	(United Kingdom) Will Hoy	(United Kingdom) Will Hoy	Team Securicor ICS Toyota	(United Kingdom) Sean Walker
5	R5	Brands Hatch (Grand Prix)	7 June	(United Kingdom) Will Hoy	(United Kingdom) Steve Soper	(United Kingdom) John Cleland	Vauxhall Sport	(United Kingdom) Matt Neal
6	R6	Donington Park (Grand Prix)	21 June	(United Kingdom) Will Hoy	(United Kingdom) Steve Soper	(United Kingdom) Will Hoy	Team Securicor ICS Toyota	(United Kingdom) Matt Neal
6	R7	Donington Park (Grand Prix)	21 June		(United Kingdom) Will Hoy	(United Kingdom) Tim Harvey	M Team Shell Racing	(United Kingdom) Matt Neal
7	R8	Silverstone Circuit (Grand Prix)	11 July	(United Kingdom) John Cleland	(United Kingdom) Will Hoy	(United Kingdom) Jeff Allam	Vauxhall Sport	(United Kingdom) James Kaye
8	R9	Knockhill Circuit	26 July	(United Kingdom) David Leslie	(United Kingdom) Jeff Allam	(United Kingdom) Jeff Allam	Vauxhall Sport	(United Kingdom) Matt Neal
8	R10	Knockhill Circuit	26 July		(United Kingdom) John Cleland	(United Kingdom) Tim Harvey	M Team Shell Racing	(United Kingdom) James Kaye
9	R11	Pembrey Circuit	9 August	(United Kingdom) Tim Harvey	(United Kingdom) Steve Soper	(United Kingdom) Tim Harvey	M Team Shell Racing	(United Kingdom) Sean Walker
10	R12	Brands Hatch (Indy)	31 August	(United Kingdom) Steve Soper	(United Kingdom) Andy Rouse	(United Kingdom) Tim Harvey	M Team Shell Racing	(United Kingdom) Matt Neal
10	R13	Brands Hatch (Indy)	31 August		(United Kingdom) Will Hoy	(United Kingdom) Tim Harvey	M Team Shell Racing	(United Kingdom) Matt Neal
11	R14	Donington Park (Grand Prix)	20 September	(United Kingdom) David Leslie	(United Kingdom) Steve Soper	(United Kingdom) Tim Harvey	M Team Shell Racing	(United Kingdom) James Kaye
12	R15	Silverstone Circuit (Grand Prix)	4 October	(United Kingdom) Andy Rouse	(United Kingdom) Steve Soper	(United Kingdom) Andy Rouse	Team Securicor ICS Toyota	(United Kingdom) James Kaye

== Championship results ==
=== Drivers Championship ===
Points system
**1st**	**2nd**	**3rd**	**4th**	**5th**	**6th**	**7th**	**8th**	**9th**	**10th**
24	18	12	10	8	6	4	3	2	1

Notes

- In double race events half points were awarded to the first 8 finishers of either event.

Pos	Driver	SIL	THR	OUL	SNE	BRH	DON		SIL	KNO		PEM	BRH		DON	SIL	Pts
1	(United Kingdom) Tim Harvey	8	8	4	Ret	6	4	1	4	2	1	**1**	1	**1**	1	4	152
2	(United Kingdom) Will Hoy	4	4	**2**	**1**	**Ret**	**1**	**2**	2	5	Ret	5	2	2	4	5	149
3	(United Kingdom) John Cleland	**1**	**1**	11	2	1	2	4	**3**	DSQ	3	Ret	4	3	3	Ret	145
4	(United Kingdom) Jeff Allam	3	3	3	6	2	5	Ret	1	1	**2**	6	5	9	14	2	137
5	(United Kingdom) Andy Rouse	2	2	1	4	Ret	3	Ret	Ret	3	4	13	3	4	6	**1**	128
6	(United Kingdom) Steve Soper		5	8		3	17	3		4	6	2	**Ret**	5	2	Ret	77
7	(United Kingdom) David Leslie	7	7	5	5	5	6	5	7	**Ret**	DNS	7	6	6	**10**	3	66
8	(United Kingdom) Tim Sugden	5	14	9	9	4	8	7	11	Ret	DNS	3	9	13	Ret	6	43
9	(Switzerland) Alain Menu	10	6	6	3	Ret	Ret	Ret	9	DNS	DNS						27
10	(United Kingdom) James Kaye	Ret	Ret	13	Ret	13	14	Ret	5	12	9	14	Ret	12	5	8	19
11	(Denmark) Kris Nissen											4	7	7	Ret	7	18
12	(United Kingdom) Kieth O'Dor	6	15	12	Ret	7	16	8	10	10	7	9	10	8	Ret	Ret	17
13	(United Kingdom) Ray Bellm	9	Ret	10	12	Ret	7	10	6	6	8	DNS					15
14	(United Kingdom) Bobby Verdon-Roe	11	16	7	13	9	11	9	8	Ret	Ret						9
15	(United Kingdom) Andy Middlehurst	19	10	17	8	Ret	9	6	14	9	DNS	12					7
16	(United Kingdom) Matt Neal	14	Ret	Ret	Ret	8	13	11	Ret	7	Ret	15	11	10	Ret	12	5
17	(Denmark) Thorkild Thyrring	Ret	Ret	Ret	7	10	18	Ret									5
18	(United Kingdom) Patrick Watts	Ret	12	14	11	Ret	12	Ret	Ret	Ret	5	11	8	Ret	Ret	11	5
19	(United Kingdom) Gary Ayles														7		4
20	(United Kingdom) Sean Walker	13	11	15	10	14	15	Ret	Ret			8	14	14	12	14	4
21	(United Kingdom) Ian Flux	12	9	Ret					16							9	4
22	(United Kingdom) James Weaver												13	11	8	Ret	3
23	(United Kingdom) Julian Bailey												16	Ret	9	13	2
24	(United Kingdom) Robb Gravett	15	Ret	Ret	Ret	11	10	Ret	15			10	12	Ret	11	16	1
25	(United Kingdom) Colin McRae									8	DSQ						1
26	(United Kingdom) Tiff Needell															10	1
27	(United Kingdom) Ian Forrest									11	10					Ret	0
28	(United Kingdom) Karl Jones	16	13	16	Ret	12	Ret	DNS	13	Ret	DNS						0
29	(United Kingdom) Laurence Bristow	17							12			DNS					0
30	(United Kingdom) Dennis Leech								Ret			17	15	15	13	15	0
31	(United Kingdom) Alex Portman											16	Ret	DNS	15	Ret	0
32	(United Kingdom) Alistair Lyall															17	0
33	(United Kingdom) Guy Povey	18															0
Pos	Driver	SIL	THR	OUL	SNE	BRH	DON		SIL	KNO		PEM	BRH		DON	SIL	Pts

|valign="top"|

Colour	Result
Gold	Winner
Silver	Second place
Bronze	Third place
Green	Points classification
Blue	Non-points classification
Blue	Non-classified finish (NC)
Purple	Retired, not classified (Ret)
Red	Did not qualify (DNQ)
Red	Did not pre-qualify (DNPQ)
Black	Disqualified (DSQ)
White	Did not start (DNS)
White	Withdrew (WD)
White	Race cancelled (C)
Blank	Did not practice (DNP)
Blank	Did not arrive (DNA)
Blank	Excluded (EX)

|}

- Note: **bold** signifies pole position, italics signifies fastest lap.

=== Manufacturers Championship ===
Pos	Manufacturer	SIL	THR	OUL	SNE	BRH	DON		SIL	KNO		PEM	BRH		DON	SIL	Pts
1	Vauxhall / Vauxhall Sport/Ecurie Ecosse	1	1	3	2	1	2	4	1	1	2	6	4	3	3	2	136
2	BMW / M Team Shell Racing/M Team Mobil	5	5	4	3	3	4	1	4	2	1	1	1	1	1	4	134
3	Toyota / Team Securicor ICS Toyota	2	2	1	1	10	1	2	2	3	4	5	2	2	4	1	134
4	Nissan / Nissan Janspeed Racing	6	10	12	8	7	9	6	10	9	7	9	10	8	8	10	96
5	Peugeot / Peugeot Talbot Sport/Peugeot Italia Team	15	Ret	Ret	Ret	11	10	Ret	15			10	12	Ret	11	9	49
6	Mazda / Shell Mazda Racing Team	Ret	12	14	11	Ret	12	Ret	Ret	Ret	5	11	8	Ret	Ret	11	48
Pos	Manufacturer	SIL	THR	OUL	SNE	BRH	DON		SIL	KNO		PEM	BRH		DON	SIL	Pts

=== TOCA Challenge Cup for Privateers ===
Pos	Driver	SIL	THR	OUL	SNE	BRH	DON		SIL	KNO		PEM	BRH		DON	SIL	Pts
1	(United Kingdom) James Kaye	Ret	Ret	13	Ret	13	14	Ret	5	12	9	14	Ret	12	5	8	71
2	(United Kingdom) Matt Neal	14	Ret	Ret	Ret	8	13	11	Ret	7	Ret	15	11	10	Ret	12	68
3	(United Kingdom) Sean Walker	13	11	15	10	14	15	Ret	Ret			8	14	14	12	14	63
4	(United Kingdom) Ian Flux	12	9	Ret					16								21
5	(United Kingdom) Karl Jones	16	13	16	Ret	12	Ret	DNS	13	Ret	DNS						21
6	(United Kingdom) Dennis Leech								Ret			17	15	15	13	15	17
7	(United Kingdom) Ian Forrest									11	10					Ret	12
8	(United Kingdom) Laurence Bristow	17							12			DNS					8
9	(United Kingdom) Alistair Lyall															17	2
10	(United Kingdom) Guy Povey	18															1
Pos	Driver	SIL	THR	OUL	SNE	BRH	DON		SIL	KNO		PEM	BRH		DON	SIL	Pts
