= Ian Forrest =

British racing driver (born 1950)

- Nationality: (United Kingdom) British
- Born: 22 February 1950 (age 76) Kirkliston, Scotland

British Touring Car Championship
- Years active: 1989–1992
- Teams: Ian Forrest; Ecosse Motorsport; Drambuie Racing
- Starts: 42
- Wins: 0
- Poles: 0
- Fastest laps: 0
- Best finish: 11th in 1989

Ian Forrest (born 22 February 1950 in Kirkliston, Scotland) is a British racing driver.

Forrest first started racing in 1971, and went on to win 26 national saloon and sports car titles in his native Scotland. In 1989 he first entered the British Touring Car Championship. Forrest competed in four consecutive seasons in the BTCC, each time with a privately entered BMW M3, prepared by Prodrive. His 1991 effort saw him win the Privateer award and the £10,000 prize.

Forrest is currently the Circuit Manager at Knockhill Racing Circuit in Scotland.

Forrest is a qualified Clerk of the Course for motorcycle racing.

Forrest was awarded the Jackie Stewart Medal in 2006 and The Jim Clark Trophy in 2010 for lifetime services to Scottish Motorsports.

Forrest's son, Sandy, also races and has competed in the BRSCC Ford Fiesta Championship.

Forrest has also been seen regularly on Mark Evans' TV "Is Born" Series for Discovery Channel; "A Car Is Born", "A Car Is Reborn" and "A Racing Car Is Born"

== Racing record ==
=== Complete British Touring Car Championship results ===
(key) (Races in bold indicate pole position) (Races in italics indicate fastest lap)

Year	Team	Car	Class	1	2	3	4	5	6	7	8	9	10	11	12	13	14	15	Pos.	Pts	Class
1989	Ian Forrest	BMW M3	B	OUL; Ret	SIL ovr:18 cls:4	THR ovr:18 cls:5	DON ovr:8 cls:3	THR; Ret	SIL ovr:15 cls:2	SIL ovr:17 cls:3	BRH; DNS	SNE ovr:14 cls:3	BRH ovr:10 cls:3	BIR ovr:13 cls:3	DON ovr14 cls:3	SIL			11th	35	4th
1990	Ecosse Motorsport	BMW M3	B	OUL ovr:9 cls:5	DON; Ret	THR ovr:14 cls:7	SIL ovr:13 cls:7	OUL ovr:18 cls:9	SIL; Ret	BRH ovr:10 cls:7	SNE; Ret	BRH ovr:14 cls:8	BIR ovr:14 cls:9	DON; Ret	THR ovr:8 cls:4	SIL ovr:10 cls:4			15th	47	8th
1991	Drambuie Racing	BMW M3		SIL; 12	SNE; 11	DON; 11	THR; 15	SIL; 15	BRH; 14	SIL; 15	DON; 1; 13	DON; 2 NC	OUL; 12	BRH; 1; 12	BRH; 2 Ret	DON; 12	THR; 13	SIL; 22	27th	0	
1992	Ian Forrest	BMW M3		SIL	THR	OUL	SNE	BRH	DON; 1	DON; 2	SIL	KNO; 1; 11	KNO; 2; 10	PEM	BRH; 1	BRH; 2	DON	SIL; Ret	27th	0	
