= Karl Jones =

British racing driver (born 1957)

- Nationality: (United Kingdom) British
- Born: Franklyn De Karl Jones; 4 April 1957 (age 69) Llantwit Major, Wales

British Saloon / Touring Car Championship
- Years active: 1985, 1987–1990, 1992
- Teams: Asquith Autosport; Dennis Leech; Ecosse Motorsport; Techspeed Racing
- Starts: 36
- Wins: 0
- Poles: 1
- Fastest laps: 0
- Best finish: 26th in 1987

Franklyn De Karl Jones (born 4 April 1957 in Llantwit Major, Wales) is a British former auto racing driver. He is best known for competing in the British Touring Car Championship (BTCC)

== Career ==
Jones started racing in 1981, finishing third in his debut season in the Junior Formula Ford 1600 Championship. The following year, he finished as runner-up, then champion in 1983 of Brands Hatch FF1600. In 1985, he competed in the BRSCC Production Saloon Championship, finishing as runner-up. He went on to be champion of the series in 1986, driving a Fiat Strada. He spent one more season in the championship, this time competing in a Ford Escort RS Turbo.

Jones stepped up to the BTCC in 1988, competing for two seasons in his Duckhams backed Class A Ford Sierra RS500. During his time here, he managed two second-place finishes. He did not return in 1990 due to budget reasons. He did compete in the Willhire 24 Hour race that year. In 1991, he competed in selected events of both the Renault Clio Cup and Ford Fiesta Championship. Jones made a return to the BTCC in 1992, with a BMW M3 for the independent Techspeed Racing team. A troubled season ended after round ten at Knockhill with no championship points.

In 1993, Jones switched from touring cars to compete in the RS2000 rallysport series with a car owned by Blakes Ford of Liverpool. In 1994, he competed in the Ford Fiesta Championship entered again by Blakes and sponsored by Duckhams.

== Racing record ==
=== Complete British Saloon / Touring Car Championship results ===
(key) (Races in bold indicate pole position – 1988–1990 in class) (Races in italics indicate fastest lap – 1 point awarded ?–1989 in class)

Year	Team	Car	Class	1	2	3	4	5	6	7	8	9	10	11	12	13	14	15	DC	Pts	Class
1985	Autocar Magazine with Marshall Asquith	Ford Escort RS1600i	C	SIL	OUL	THR	DON	THR	SIL	DON	SIL; 18	SNE	BRH	BRH	SIL				28th	3	10th
1987	Asquith Autosport	Ford Escort RS Turbo	B	SIL	OUL	THR	THR	SIL	SIL; Ret	BRH; DSQ	SNE	DON		DON; Ret	SIL; 10				26th	6	7th
1987	Dennis Leech	Rover Vitesse	A										OUL; 6‡						26th	6	NC
1988	Asquith Autosport	Ford Sierra RS500	A	SIL	OUL; Ret	THR; 10	DON; Ret	THR; 2	SIL; 9	SIL; 10	BRH; 6	SNE; 6	BRH; Ret	BIR; C	DON; 7	SIL; DNS			27th	9	12th
1989	Asquith Autosport	Ford Sierra RS500	A	OUL; Ret	SIL; 11	THR; 2	DON; Ret	THR; 4	SIL; 12	SIL; 12	BRH; 7	SNE; Ret	BRH; Ret	BIR; DNQ	DON; 8	**SIL**; 9			33rd	7	10th
1990	Ecosse Motorsport	BMW M3	B	OUL	DON	THR	SIL	OUL	SIL	BRH	SNE	BRH; DNP	BIR	DON	THR	SIL			NC	0	NC
1992	Techspeed Racing	BMW M3		SIL; 16	THR; 13	OUL; 16	SNE; Ret	BRH; 12	DON; 1 Ret	DON; 2 DNS	SIL; 13	KNO; 1 Ret	KNO; 2 DNS	PEM	BRH; 1	BRH; 2	DON	SIL	NC	0	

‡ Endurance driver.

=== Complete World Touring Car Championship results ===
(key) (Races in bold indicate pole position) (Races in italics indicate fastest lap)

Year	Team	Car	1	2	3	4	5	6	7	8	9	10	11	DC	Pts
1987	(United Kingdom) Asquith Autosport	Ford Escort RS Turbo	MNZ	JAR	DIJ	NÜR	SPA	BNO	SIL; Ret	BAT	CLD	WEL	FJI	NA	0

=== Complete European Touring Car Championship results ===
(key) (Races in bold indicate pole position) (Races in italics indicate fastest lap)

Year	Team	Car	1	2	3	4	5	6	7	8	9	10	11	DC	Pts
1988	(United Kingdom) Asquith Autosport	Ford Sierra RS500	MNZ	DON	EST	JAR	DIJ	VAL	NÜR	SPA	ZOL	SIL; Ret	NOG	NC	0
