= 2006 SEAT Cupra Championship =

British motor race season

The 2006 Blaupunkt SEAT Cupra Championship season was the fourth season of the SEAT Cupra Championship. It began on 9 April at Brands Hatch, and ended on 15 October at Silverstone, after eighteen rounds held in England and Scotland. The championship was dominated by the previous season's runner-up Mat Jackson, who won eleven of the eighteen rounds. He would use the £100,000 prize for winning the championship to purchase the ex-Andy Priaulx World Touring Car Championship-winning BMW 320si for the 2007 British Touring Car Championship season. Alan Blencowe was second with 225 points, with Jonathan Adam in third with 218 points, Fulvio Mussi in fourth with 169 points and Ben Winrow in fifth with 166 points.

== Teams and drivers ==
All entries ran the Mk1 SEAT León.

Team	No.	Drivers	Rounds
Edenbridge Racing	1	(United Kingdom) Tom Ferrier	1-3
Edenbridge Racing	30	(United Kingdom) Carl Breeze	1-7
CMS Motorsport	30	(United Kingdom) Carl Breeze	8-9
CMS Motorsport	17	(United Kingdom) Ben Winrow	All
CMS Motorsport	44	(United Kingdom) Andy Neate	9
CMS Motorsport	14	(Italy) Antonio Musso	4-7
CMS Motorsport	88	(United Kingdom) Henry Taylor	1-2
Triple R	2	(United Kingdom) Alan Blencowe	All
Triple R	6	(United Kingdom) Richard Dawson	All
Triple R	7	(United Kingdom) Harry Vaulkhard	All
Total Control Racing	3	(United Kingdom) Fulvio Mussi	All
Total Control Racing	4	(United Kingdom) Jonathan Adam	All
Total Control Racing	5	(United Kingdom) Neil Waterworth	All
Total Control Racing	27	(Republic of Ireland) Jonathan Fildes	All
Jacksons M/Sport	8	(United Kingdom) Mat Jackson	All
Doble Motorcycles	11	(United Kingdom) Mike Doble	1-5, 8-9
Churchill Motorsport	14	(United Kingdom) Adrian Churchill	1-2, 6-7, 9
Churchill Motorsport	32	(United Kingdom) Ian Churchill	1-2, 6-7, 9
Johnson's Motorsport	16	(United Kingdom) Matt Johnson	1-4
Johnson's Motorsport	21	(United Kingdom) Robert Ross	1-4
GVR	41	(United Kingdom) Andrew Jordan	6, 8-9
WAAPRacing.com	69	(United Kingdom) Tim Bevan	1-6, 8-9
NJL Racing	99	(United Kingdom) Nick Leason	1-2

== Calendar ==
Round	Track	Date	Pole position	Fastest lap	Winner	Winning team
1	Brands Hatch	9 April	(United Kingdom) Mat Jackson	(United Kingdom) Alan Blencowe (United Kingdom) Ben Winrow	(United Kingdom) Mat Jackson	Jacksons M/Sport
2	Brands Hatch	9 April	(Republic of Ireland) Jonathan Fildes	(United Kingdom) Fulvio Mussi	(United Kingdom) Mat Jackson	Jacksons M/Sport
3	Oulton Park	14 May	(United Kingdom) Mat Jackson	(United Kingdom) Neil Waterworth	(United Kingdom) Mat Jackson	Jacksons M/Sport
4	Oulton Park	14 May	(United Kingdom) Jonathan Adam	(United Kingdom) Jonathan Adam	(United Kingdom) Jonathan Adam	Total Control Racing
5	Thruxton	4 June	(United Kingdom) Jonathan Adam	(United Kingdom) Mat Jackson	(United Kingdom) Mat Jackson	Jacksons M/Sport
6	Thruxton	4 June	(United Kingdom) Mat Jackson	(United Kingdom) Jonathan Adam	(United Kingdom) Fulvio Mussi	Total Control Racing
7	Croft	16 July	(United Kingdom) Fulvio Mussi	(United Kingdom) Mat Jackson	(United Kingdom) Mat Jackson	Jacksons M/Sport
8	Croft	16 July	(United Kingdom) Ben Winrow	(United Kingdom) Ben Winrow	(United Kingdom) Ben Winrow	CMS Motorsport
9	Donington Park	30 July	(United Kingdom) Alan Blencowe	(United Kingdom) Mat Jackson	(United Kingdom) Mat Jackson	Jacksons M/Sport
10	Donington Park	30 July	(United Kingdom) Mat Jackson	(United Kingdom) Alan Blencowe	(United Kingdom) Mat Jackson	Jacksons M/Sport
11	Snetterton	13 August	(United Kingdom) Mat Jackson	(United Kingdom) Mat Jackson	(United Kingdom) Mat Jackson	Jacksons M/Sport
12	Snetterton	13 August	(United Kingdom) Jonathan Adam	(United Kingdom) Mat Jackson	(United Kingdom) Mat Jackson	Jacksons M/Sport
13	Knockhill	3 September	(United Kingdom) Fulvio Mussi	(United Kingdom) Jonathan Adam	(United Kingdom) Jonathan Adam	Total Control Racing
14	Knockhill	3 September	(United Kingdom) Alan Blencowe	(United Kingdom) Alan Blencowe	(United Kingdom) Mat Jackson	Jacksons M/Sport
15	Brands Hatch	24 September	(United Kingdom) Alan Blencowe	(United Kingdom) Alan Blencowe	(United Kingdom) Alan Blencowe	Triple R
16	Brands Hatch	24 September	(United Kingdom) Jonathan Adam	(United Kingdom) Alan Blencowe	(United Kingdom) Carl Breeze	CMS Motorsport
17	Silverstone	15 October	(United Kingdom) Jonathan Adam	(United Kingdom) Alan Blencowe	(United Kingdom) Carl Breeze	CMS Motorsport
18	Silverstone	15 October	(United Kingdom) Carl Breeze	(United Kingdom) Ben Winrow	(United Kingdom) Mat Jackson	Jacksons M/Sport

== Championship Standings ==
- Points were awarded as follows:

Pos	1	2	3	4	5	6	7	8	9	10	11	12	FL
Race 1	17	15	13	11	9	7	5	4	3	2	1	0	1
Race 2	20	17	15	13	11	9	7	5	4	3	2	1	1

Pos	Driver	BRH		OUL		THR		CRO		DON		SNE		KNO		BRH		SIL		Pts
1	(United Kingdom) Mat Jackson	1	1	1	11	1	7	1	2	1	1	1	1	2	1	4	3	Ret	1	277
2	(United Kingdom) Alan Blencowe	6	5	2	4	3	4	5	13	2	2	2	2	3	2	1	4	3	8	233
3	(United Kingdom) Jonathan Adam	7	15	3	1	2	2	6	3	5	7	3	4	1	4	2	2	9	2	226
4	(United Kingdom) Fulvio Mussi	3	4	4	Ret	Ret	1	2	11	6	5	4	Ret	5	9	3	5	2	4	173
5	(United Kingdom) Ben Winrow	2	8	10	3	6	3	3	1	3	3	5	13	Ret	6	7	Ret	4	7	168
6	(Republic of Ireland) Jonathan Fildes	8	2	5	2	Ret	6	9	6	Ret	11	5	3	4	3	6	Ret	5	6	149
7	(United Kingdom) Carl Breeze	5	7	8	12	Ret	5	4	4	4	4	6	11	12	11	5	1	1	13	141
8	(United Kingdom) Neil Waterworth	10	11	6	Ret	Ret	11	Ret	9	Ret	DNS	Ret	6	11	5	8	6	6	3	76
9	(United Kingdom) Harry Vaulkhard	11	13	12	8	7	Ret	11	10	8	6	7	8	7	7	10	7	8	10	69
10	(United Kingdom) Matt Johnson	9	3	9	5	9	4	7	Ret											60
11	(United Kingdom) Robert Ross	13	12	7	6	8	5	8	5											44
12	(United Kingdom) Richard Dawson	16	16	13	9	9	12	10	7	9	9	11	12	8	13	11	9	12	11	40
13	(United Kingdom) Ian Churchill	12	9	Ret	Ret							10	10	6	10			DNS	5	32
14	(United Kingdom) Lewis Carter							Ret	8	7	10	8	9	9	12					26
15	(United Kingdom) Mike Doble	14	14	11	7	10	10	Ret	Ret	Ret	Ret					9	10	13	12	21
16	(United Kingdom) Adrian Churchill	Ret	Ret	Ret	Ret							12	7	10	8			11	9	20
17	(United Kingdom) Tim Bevan	15	17	Ret	10	Ret	Ret	12	12	10	8	Ret	13			12	Ret	7	14	17
18	(United Kingdom) Andrew Jordan											9	Ret			13	8	10	DNS	10
19	(United Kingdom) Tom Ferrier	9	10	Ret	Ret	8	Ret													10
20	(United Kingdom) Henry Taylor	Ret	6	Ret	Ret															9
-	(United Kingdom) Nick Leason	Ret	Ret	Ret	Ret															
-	(United Kingdom) Andy Neate																	Ret	DNS	
Pos	Driver	BRH		OUL		THR		CRO		DON		SNE		KNO		BRH		SIL		Pts

Colour	Result
Gold	Winner
Silver	Second place
Bronze	Third place
Green	Points classification
Blue	Non-points classification
Blue	Non-classified finish (NC)
Purple	Retired, not classified (Ret)
Red	Did not qualify (DNQ)
Red	Did not pre-qualify (DNPQ)
Black	Disqualified (DSQ)
White	Did not start (DNS)
White	Withdrew (WD)
White	Race cancelled (C)
Blank	Did not practice (DNP)
Blank	Did not arrive (DNA)
Blank	Excluded (EX)
