= 2007 SEAT Cupra Championship =

British motor race season

The 2007 Blaupunkt SEAT Cupra Championship season was the fifth season of the SEAT Cupra Championship. It began on 1 April at Brands Hatch, and ended on 14 October at Thruxton, supporting rounds of the British Touring Car Championship.

== Teams and drivers ==
Drivers in the main class drove the new Mk2 SEAT León and drivers in the Cupra R class drove the older Mk1 SEAT León.

Team	No.	Drivers	Rounds
Triple R	1	(United Kingdom) Tom Boardman	5-10
Triple R	12	(United Kingdom) Alan Blencowe	1-7
CMS Motorsport	2	(United Kingdom) Carl Breeze	All
CMS Motorsport	6	(United Kingdom) Guy Halley	1-2
CMS Motorsport	10	(United Kingdom) Oli Wilkinson	1-7
Total Control Racing	3	(United Kingdom) Ray MacDowall	All
Total Control Racing	4	(United Kingdom) Jonathan Adam	All
Total Control Racing	8	(United Kingdom) Neil Waterworth	All
Total Control Racing	23	(United Kingdom) Fulvio Mussi	All
Maxtreme	5	(United Kingdom) Liam McMillan	All
Welch Motorsport	7	(United Kingdom) Daniel Welch	All
Nixon Motorsport	9	(United Kingdom) Gareth Nixon	1-9
Stewart Whyte	70	(United Kingdom) Stewart Whyte	All
Cupra R Class
Doble Motorsports	11	(United Kingdom) Mike Doble	1–8, 10
Churchill Motorsport	14	(United Kingdom) Adrian Churchill	All
Churchill Motorsport	32	(United Kingdom) Ian Churchill	All
CMS Motorsport	15	(United Kingdom) Andy Setterfield	1, 4
CMS Motorsport	16	(United Kingdom) James Morgan	2–6, 8, 10
CMS Motorsport	17	(United Kingdom) Andy Neate	5
Nixon Motorsport	18	(United Kingdom) Stewart Lines	6
Total Control Racing	20	(United Kingdom) Alex MacDowall	9
Startline Services	24	(United Kingdom) Rob Austin	1–3, 5–6, 8
Startline Services	36	(United Kingdom) Eric Bailey	1–7, 10
Second Time Round	27	(United Kingdom) Kristian Waite	All
Pyro Motorsport	36	(United Kingdom) Mark Hunt	9-10
Pyro Motorsport	69	(United Kingdom) Tim Bevan	1-6
Advent Motorsport	44	(Sweden) Freddy Nordström	All
Triple R	77	(United Kingdom) Harry Vaulkhard	All

== Race calendar and results ==
Round		Circuit	Date	Pole position	Fastest lap	Winning driver	Winning team	R Class Winner
1	R1	Brands Hatch Indy, Kent	1 April	(United Kingdom) Gareth Nixon	(United Kingdom) Jonathan Adam	(United Kingdom) Carl Breeze	CMS Motorsport	(United Kingdom) Ian Churchill
1	R2	Brands Hatch Indy, Kent	1 April	(United Kingdom) Carl Breeze	(United Kingdom) Jonathan Adam	(United Kingdom) Jonathan Adam	Total Control Racing	(United Kingdom) Ian Churchill
2	R3	Rockingham Motor Speedway	22 April	(United Kingdom) Carl Breeze	(United Kingdom) Alan Blencowe	(United Kingdom) Alan Blencowe	Triple R	(United Kingdom) Adrian Churchill
2	R4	Rockingham Motor Speedway	22 April	(United Kingdom) Jonathan Adam	(United Kingdom) Jonathan Adam	(United Kingdom) Jonathan Adam	Total Control Racing	(Sweden) Freddy Nordström
3	R5	Thruxton Circuit, Hampshire	6 May	(United Kingdom) Daniel Welch	(United Kingdom) Daniel Welch	(United Kingdom) Jonathan Adam	Total Control Racing	(Sweden) Freddy Nordström
3	R6	Thruxton Circuit, Hampshire	6 May	(United Kingdom) Jonathan Adam	(United Kingdom) Gareth Nixon	(United Kingdom) Jonathan Adam	Total Control Racing	(Sweden) Freddy Nordström
4	R7	Croft Circuit, North Yorkshire	3 June	(United Kingdom) Jonathan Adam	(United Kingdom) Oli Wilkinson	(United Kingdom) Oli Wilkinson	CMS Motorsport	(United Kingdom) Ian Churchill
4	R8	Croft Circuit, North Yorkshire	3 June	(United Kingdom) Jonathan Adam	(United Kingdom) Jonathan Adam	(United Kingdom) Jonathan Adam	Total Control Racing	(United Kingdom) Ian Churchill
5	R9	Oulton Park Island, Cheshire	24 June	(United Kingdom) Tom Boardman	(United Kingdom) Alan Blencowe	(United Kingdom) Alan Blencowe	Triple R	(United Kingdom) Ian Churchill
5	R10	Oulton Park Island, Cheshire	24 June	(United Kingdom) Jonathan Adam	(United Kingdom) Jonathan Adam	(United Kingdom) Jonathan Adam	Total Control Racing	(United Kingdom) Adrian Churchill
6	R11	Donington Park National	15 July	(United Kingdom) Jonathan Adam	(United Kingdom) Jonathan Adam	(United Kingdom) Jonathan Adam	Total Control Racing	(United Kingdom) Harry Vaulkhard
6	R12	Donington Park National	15 July	(United Kingdom) Tom Boardman	(United Kingdom) Ray MacDowall	(United Kingdom) Tom Boardman	Triple R	(United Kingdom) Adrian Churchill
7	R13	Snetterton Motor Racing Circuit, Norfolk	29 July	(United Kingdom) Jonathan Adam	(United Kingdom) Jonathan Adam	(United Kingdom) Jonathan Adam	Total Control Racing	(United Kingdom) Ian Churchill
7	R14	Snetterton Motor Racing Circuit, Norfolk	29 July	(United Kingdom) Carl Breeze	(United Kingdom) Gareth Nixon	(United Kingdom) Carl Breeze	CMS Motorsport	(United Kingdom) Harry Vaulkhard
8	R15	Brands Hatch Indy, Kent	19 August	(United Kingdom) Gareth Nixon	(United Kingdom) Tom Boardman	(United Kingdom) Tom Boardman	Triple R	(United Kingdom) Harry Vaulkhard
8	R16	Brands Hatch Indy, Kent	19 August	(United Kingdom) Jonathan Adam	(United Kingdom) Gareth Nixon	(United Kingdom) Fulvio Mussi	Total Control Racing	(United Kingdom) Ian Churchill
9	R17	Knockhill Racing Circuit, Fife	2 September	(United Kingdom) Jonathan Adam	(United Kingdom) Jonathan Adam	(United Kingdom) Jonathan Adam	Total Control Racing	(United Kingdom) Harry Vaulkhard
9	R18	Knockhill Racing Circuit, Fife	2 September	(United Kingdom) Jonathan Adam	(United Kingdom) Jonathan Adam	(United Kingdom) Carl Breeze	CMS Motorsport	(United Kingdom) Ian Churchill
10	R19	Thruxton Circuit, Hampshire	14 October	(United Kingdom) Tom Boardman	(United Kingdom) Daniel Welch	(United Kingdom) Daniel Welch	Welch Motorsport	(United Kingdom) Ian Churchill
10	R20	Thruxton Circuit, Hampshire	14 October	(United Kingdom) Daniel Welch	(United Kingdom) Daniel Welch	(United Kingdom) Daniel Welch	Welch Motorsport	(United Kingdom) Ian Churchill

== Championship standings ==
- Points system applies to both classes.
- Drivers' top 18 results count towards the championship.
- Only half-points were awarded in Round 11.

Points system
Pos	**1st**	**2nd**	**3rd**	**4th**	**5th**	**6th**	**7th**	**8th**	**9th**	**10th**	**11th**	**12th**	Fastest lap	Best improvement on grid position
Race 1	17	15	13	11	9	7	5	4	3	2	1	0	1	1
Race 2	20	17	15	13	11	9	7	5	4	3	2	1	1	1

Pos	Driver	BHI		ROC		THR		CRO		OUL		DON		SNE		BHI		KNO		THR		Pts
1	(United Kingdom) Jonathan Adam	2	1	3	**1**	1	**1**	**2**	**1**	4	**1**	**1**	2	**1**	7	Ret	**2**	**1**	**2**	3	3	302
2	(United Kingdom) Fulvio Mussi	Ret	2	6	3	6	2	3	2	2	8	2	5	7	4	DSQ	1	7	6	4	4	204.5
3	(United Kingdom) Carl Breeze	1	**4**	**Ret**	7	3	5	4	5	3	10	Ret	DNS	2	**1**	3	4	9	1	18	2	204
4	(United Kingdom) Neil Waterworth	6	5	5	5	4	3	9	3	7	4	3	4	8	Ret	5	5	6	4	5	7	177.5
5	(United Kingdom) Daniel Welch	Ret	3	Ret	Ret	**2**	8	5	6	8	6	5	7	6	Ret	2	6	2	5	1	**1**	153.5
6	(United Kingdom) Gareth Nixon	**5**	8	2	2	5	4	Ret	8	Ret	9	Ret	DNS	5	2	**DSQ**	3	5	3			148
7	(United Kingdom) Alan Blencowe	3	7	1	4	8	6	6	4	1	5	8	3	3	Ret							145
8	(United Kingdom) Tom Boardman									**Ret**	2	10	**1**	4	3	1	Ret	3	7	**2**	5	132
9	(United Kingdom) Oli Wilkinson	4	6	4	Ret	7	7	1	7	6	3	Ret	8	11	6							106
10	(United Kingdom) Stewart Whyte	Ret	11	10	Ret	9	DNS	7	Ret	5	7	4	12	Ret	5	4	Ret	4	8	7	6	88.5
11	(United Kingdom) Ray MacDowall	11	9	8	Ret	11	10	10	12	Ret	DNS	11	6	10	8	6	7	Ret	10	6	8	70.5
12	(United Kingdom) Liam McMillan	7	10	7	Ret	10	9	8	9	18	Ret	7	9	9	Ret	Ret	Ret	8	9	16	9	49
13	(United Kingdom) Guy Halley	8	13	9	6																	13
Cupra R Class
1	(United Kingdom) Harry Vaulkhard	10	14	12	Ret	17	13	12	13	14	15	6	11	13	9	7	9	10	**13**	10	16	267
2	(United Kingdom) Ian Churchill	9	**12**	Ret	**DNS**	**13**	12	**11**	**10**	9	**12**	**Ret**	**DNS**	**12**	**Ret**	9	**8**	**14**	11	8	**10**	263
3	(United Kingdom) Adrian Churchill	12	15	11	Ret	14	Ret	13	16	10	11	9	10	14	Ret	8	10	13	12	11	13	248.5
4	(Sweden) Freddy Nordström	**18**	18	**Ret**	8	12	**11**	Ret	11	11	13	Ret	DNS	Ret	10	**10**	11	11	14	9	11	222
5	(United Kingdom) Mike Doble	13	16	16	10	15	15	14	14	13	19	13	14	15	Ret	12	13			**12**	12	171.5
6	(United Kingdom) Kristian Waite	17	20	14	11	16	14	15	17	15	20	Ret	DNS	16	11	13	15	16	16	15	14	146
7	(United Kingdom) Eric Bailey	16	19	15	9	20	Ret	16	15	16	16	Ret	13			11	12			14	Ret	116
8	(United Kingdom) Rob Austin	15	Ret	13	Ret	19	16			12	17	Ret	DNS			Ret	14					60
9	(United Kingdom) Tim Bevan	14	17	Ret	Ret	18	17	Ret	18	17	14	Ret	DNS									53
10	(United Kingdom) Mark Hunt																	12	15	13	15	25
11	(United Kingdom) James Morgan			17	12	Ret	DNS	Ret	Ret	Ret	DNS	Ret	DNS			Ret	16			17	Ret	24
12	(United Kingdom) Andy Setterfield	Ret	21					17	DNS													5
guest drivers ineligible for points
-	(United Kingdom) Stewart Lines											12	15									0
-	(United Kingdom) Alex MacDowall																	15	17			0
-	(United Kingdom) Andy Neate									**Ret**	18											0
Pos	Driver	BHI		ROC		THR		CRO		OUL		DON		SNE		BHI		KNO		THR		Pts

Note: **bold** signifies pole position in class, italics signifies fastest lap in class

Colour	Result
Gold	Winner
Silver	Second place
Bronze	Third place
Green	Points classification
Blue	Non-points classification
Blue	Non-classified finish (NC)
Purple	Retired, not classified (Ret)
Red	Did not qualify (DNQ)
Red	Did not pre-qualify (DNPQ)
Black	Disqualified (DSQ)
White	Did not start (DNS)
White	Withdrew (WD)
White	Race cancelled (C)
Blank	Did not practice (DNP)
Blank	Did not arrive (DNA)
Blank	Excluded (EX)
