= 2005 SEAT Cupra Championship =

British motor race season

The 2005 Smartnav SEAT Cupra Championship season was the third season of the SEAT Cupra Championship. It began on 10 April at Donington Park and ended on 2 October at Brands Hatch, after eighteen rounds held in England and Scotland. Cars were now entered by independent teams rather than SEAT themselves, meaning less performance parity but involving more people in the series.

After finishing third in 2004, Tom Boardman won the title, by 15 points from Mat Jackson. Tom Ferrier was third on 219 points, fourth was Carl Breeze on 191 points and fifth was Alan Blencowe who finished on 116.

== Teams and drivers ==
All entries ran the Mk1 SEAT León.

Team	No.	Drivers	Rounds
Triple R	1	(United Kingdom) Sam Edwards	2
Triple R	3	(United Kingdom) Tom Boardman	All
Barwell Motorsport	2	(United Kingdom) Carl Breeze	All
Barwell Motorsport	5	(United Kingdom) Alan Blencowe	All
Motorbase Performance	6	(United Kingdom) David Pinkney	1–4, 6
Team Parker Racing	7	(United Kingdom) Tom Ferrier	All
Team Parker Racing	34	(United Kingdom) Mark Cole	1–3, 5
Jacksons M/Sport	8	(United Kingdom) Mat Jackson	All
CMS Motorsport	9	(United Kingdom) Nick Leason	3–6, 8-9
Doble M/Sport	11	(United Kingdom) Mike Doble	All
Churchill Motorsport	14	(United Kingdom) Adrian Churchill	All
Churchill Motorsport	32	(United Kingdom) Ian Churchill	All
SRE	36	(United Kingdom) Jonathan Young	All
Team GVR	41	(United Kingdom) Chris Egginton	1–2, 4, 6-8
J.S. Motorsport	42	(United Kingdom) Harry Vaulkhard	All
Total Control Racing	88	(United Kingdom) Henry Taylor	All

== Calendar ==
Round	Track	Date	Pole position	Fastest lap	Winner	Winning team
1	Donington Park	10 April	(United Kingdom) Tom Boardman	(United Kingdom) Tom Boardman	(United Kingdom) Tom Boardman	Triple R
2	Donington Park	10 April	(United Kingdom) Tom Boardman	(United Kingdom) Tom Ferrier	(United Kingdom) Tom Boardman	Triple R
3	Thruxton	1 May	(United Kingdom) Tom Boardman	(United Kingdom) Carl Breeze	(United Kingdom) Carl Breeze	Barwell Motorsport
4	Thruxton	1 May	(United Kingdom) Carl Breeze	(United Kingdom) Tom Boardman	(United Kingdom) Mat Jackson	Jacksons M/Sport
5	Brands Hatch	5 June	(United Kingdom) Carl Breeze	(United Kingdom) Tom Ferrier	(United Kingdom) Tom Ferrier	Team Parker Racing
6	Brands Hatch	5 June	(United Kingdom) Tom Ferrier	(United Kingdom) Carl Breeze	(United Kingdom) Tom Boardman	Triple R
7	Oulton Park	19 June	(United Kingdom) Mat Jackson	(United Kingdom) Tom Boardman	(United Kingdom) Tom Boardman	Triple R
8	Oulton Park	19 June	(United Kingdom) Mat Jackson	(United Kingdom) Mat Jackson	(United Kingdom) Mat Jackson	Jacksons M/Sport
9	Croft	17 July	(United Kingdom) Tom Boardman	(United Kingdom) Tom Boardman	(United Kingdom) Tom Boardman	Triple R
10	Croft	17 July	(United Kingdom) Mat Jackson	(United Kingdom) Mat Jackson	(United Kingdom) Mat Jackson	Jacksons M/Sport
11	Snetterton	7 August	(United Kingdom) Mat Jackson	(United Kingdom) Tom Ferrier	(United Kingdom) Tom Boardman	Triple R
12	Snetterton	7 August	(United Kingdom) Carl Breeze	(United Kingdom) Mat Jackson	(United Kingdom) Mat Jackson	Jacksons M/Sport
13	Knockhill	28 August	(United Kingdom) Mat Jackson	(United Kingdom) Mat Jackson	(United Kingdom) Mat Jackson	Jacksons M/Sport
14	Knockhill	28 August	(United Kingdom) Adrian Churchill	(United Kingdom) Mat Jackson	(United Kingdom) Mat Jackson	Jacksons M/Sport
15	Silverstone	18 September	(United Kingdom) Mat Jackson	(United Kingdom) Mat Jackson	(United Kingdom) Mat Jackson	Jacksons M/Sport
16	Silverstone	18 September	(United Kingdom) Mat Jackson	(United Kingdom) Tom Boardman	(United Kingdom) Tom Boardman	Triple R
17	Brands Hatch	2 October	(United Kingdom) Tom Ferrier	(United Kingdom) Mat Jackson	(United Kingdom) Mat Jackson	Jacksons M/Sport
18	Brands Hatch	2 October	(United Kingdom) Mat Jackson	(United Kingdom) Mat Jackson	(United Kingdom) Tom Ferrier	Team Parker Racing

== Championship standings ==
- Points were awarded as follows:

Pos	1	2	3	4	5	6	7	8	9	10	11	12
Race 1	17	15	13	11	9	7	5	4	3	2	1	0
Race 2	20	17	15	13	11	9	7	5	4	3	2	1

Pos	Driver	DON		THR		BRH		OUL		CRO		SNE		KNO		SIL		BRH		Pts
1	Tom Boardman	1	1	2	3	3	1	1	5	1	2	1	3	2	2	3	1	Ret	Ret	239
2	Mat Jackson	Ret	4	4	1	6	4	12	1	3	1	9	1	1	1	1	2	1	3	228
3	Tom Ferrier	2	2	9	Ret	1	2	6	8	4	4	2	4	8	4	2	3	2	1	194
4	Carl Breeze	5	6	1	2	2	3	2	6	2	3	Ret	2	4	3	4	Ret	5	2	193
5	Alan Blencowe	3	13	3	5	7	Ret	8	9	10	5	3	11	3	6	7	6	3	7	118
6	Henry Taylor			6	Ret	4	5			6	8	5	5	5	11	5	4	4	5	97
7	Ian Churchill	6	8	10	9	8	7	3	10	Ret	7	4	8	Ret	5	Ret	8	8	8	85
8	Jonathan Young	Ret	5	14	Ret	12	Ret	7	2	7	9	6	6	Ret	7	9	7	7	6	83
9	Adrian Churchill	7	7	11	9	10	9	4	9	Ret	6	Ret	10	Ret	Ret	6	5	6	4	78
10	Mark Cole	4	3	5	4	5	6			5	DNS									63
11	Mike Doble	11	10	12	8	11	10	10	4	9	11	10	12	Ret	10	11	10	9	10	42
12	Harry Vaulkhard	10	11	15	6	13	11	Ret	12	8	10	8	9	6	9	8	11	Ret	DNS	42
13	David Pinkney	9	9	7	Ret	9	8	5	3			Ret	Ret							38
14	Chris Egginton	8	12	8	10			9	11			7	7	7	8	Ret	9			38
15	Nick Leason					14	12	11	13	11	12	11	13			10	12	10	9	9
16	Sam Edwards			13	Ret															0
Pos	Driver	DON		THR		BRH		OUL		CRO		SNE		KNO		SIL		BRH		Pts

Colour	Result
Gold	Winner
Silver	Second place
Bronze	Third place
Green	Points classification
Blue	Non-points classification
Blue	Non-classified finish (NC)
Purple	Retired, not classified (Ret)
Red	Did not qualify (DNQ)
Red	Did not pre-qualify (DNPQ)
Black	Disqualified (DSQ)
White	Did not start (DNS)
White	Withdrew (WD)
White	Race cancelled (C)
Blank	Did not practice (DNP)
Blank	Did not arrive (DNA)
Blank	Excluded (EX)
