= Nick Leason =

British racing driver (born 1968)

- Nationality: British
- Born: 23 August 1968 (age 58) Purley, London, England

Previous series
- 2007 2006–07, 2009 2005–06: Porsche Carrera Cup GB; BTCC; SEAT Cupra Championship

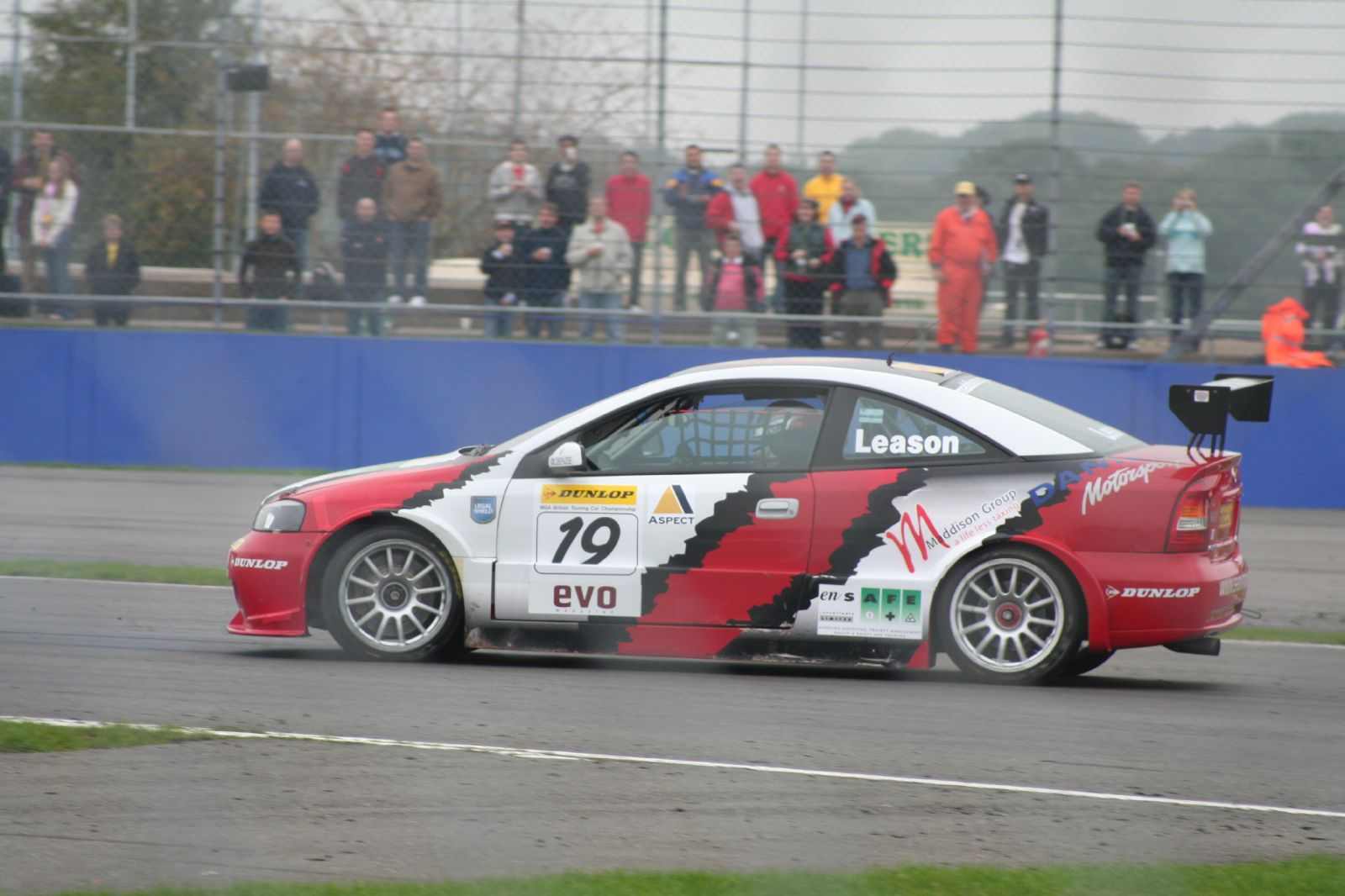
Leason driving at Silverstone in 2006.

Nick Leason (born 23 August 1968 in Purley, London) is a British racing driver.

== Career ==
=== British Touring Car Championship ===
Leason was registered as an entry in the Production Class for the 2003 Season, driving a ex-GR Motorsport Ford Focus for CMS Motorsport with support from MacMillan Cancer but this entry was delayed and ultimately never happened, he was also the test driver for a failed Super 2000 Ford Focus BTCC project in 2004.

Leason finally made his BTCC debut in 2006. He entered the last two meetings in a Vauxhall Astra Coupe run by Daniels Motorsport and previously driven by Andy Neate in the final meeting of the 2005 Season. He notably lost a wheel on his way to the grid at Silverstone.

For the 2007 season, Leason was confirmed as a driver for BTC Racing in a Lexus teamed with Chris Stockton. He did not race at Croft that year and after persistent reliability troubles he decided to abort his full season campaign. Leason achieved a final championship position of 24th.

In 2008, Leason announced that he planned to join up with Rick Kerry and Team AFM Racing to race a pair of diesel fuelled BMW 120ds, though the team missed the whole season.

Leason did eventually race the diesel powered BMW 120d in the opening four rounds of the 2009 BTCC but withdrew due to lack of budget.

=== SEAT Cupra Championship ===
Leason contested the SEAT Cupra Cup UK in 2005.

== Race career ==
- 2009 – AFM Motorsport. BMW 120D. No. 16
- 2007 – BTC Racing. Lexus IS200. No. 19.
- 2006 – Final two BTCC meetings of the season. Team NJL Racing with Daniels Motorsport. Vauxhall Astra Coupe. No. 19
- 2005 – Seat Cupra Championship
- 2004 – Test driver BTCC Ford Focus Project
- 2003 – Test driver
- 2002 – Lamborghini Supertrophy – 3rd in class points, 6th overall
- 2001 – Ford Fiesta Zetec Championship
- 2000 – Proton Coupe Cup
- 1999 – Proton Coupe Cup
- 1998 – Fiesta XR2 Challenge and Stock Hatch Championship
- 1997 – Stock Hatch Championship – 9th in points (Ford Fiesta XR2)
- 1996 – Fiesta XR2 Challenge
- 1995 – Ford Credit Fiesta Championship testing
- 1994 – Ford Credit Fiesta Championship testing

== Racing record ==
=== Complete British Touring Car Championship results ===
(key) (Races in bold indicate pole position – 1 point awarded in first race) (Races in italics indicate fastest lap – 1 point awarded all races) (* signifies that driver lead race for at least one lap – 1 point awarded all races)

Year	Team	Car	1	2	3	4	5	6	7	8	9	10	11	12	13	14	15	16	17	18	19	20	21	22	23	24	25	26	27	28	29	30	DC	Pts
2006	NJL Racing	Vauxhall Astra Coupé	BRH; 1	BRH; 2	BRH; 3	MON; 1	MON; 2	MON; 3	OUL; 1	OUL; 2	OUL; 3	THR; 1	THR; 2	THR; 3	CRO; 1	CRO; 2	CRO; 3	DON; 1	DON; 2	DON; 3	SNE; 1	SNE; 2	SNE; 3	KNO; 1	KNO; 2	KNO; 3	BRH; 1; 15	BRH; 2 DNS	BRH; 3 DNS	SIL; 1 NC	SIL; 2; 15	SIL; 3 DNS	28th	0
2007	BTC Racing	Lexus IS200	BRH; 1; 15	BRH; 2 DNS	BRH; 3 DNS	ROC; 1; 18	ROC; 2 Ret	ROC; 3; 13	THR; 1 Ret	THR; 2 DNS	THR; 3 DNS	CRO; 1	CRO; 2	CRO; 3	OUL; 1	OUL; 2	OUL; 3	DON; 1	DON; 2	DON; 3	SNE; 1	SNE; 2	SNE; 3	BRH; 1	BRH; 2	BRH; 3	KNO; 1	KNO; 2	KNO; 3	THR; 1	THR; 2	THR; 3	32nd	0
2009	Team AFM Racing	BMW 120d	BRH; 1 Ret	BRH; 2; 17	BRH; 3; 15	THR; 1 NC	THR; 2; 20	THR; 3; 15	DON; 1 Ret	DON; 2 Ret	DON; 3; 18	OUL; 1	OUL; 2	OUL; 3	CRO; 1	CRO; 2	CRO; 3	SNE; 1	SNE; 2	SNE; 3	KNO; 1	KNO; 2	KNO; 3	SIL; 1	SIL; 2	SIL; 3	ROC; 1	ROC; 2	ROC; 3	BRH; 1	BRH; 2	BRH; 3	28th	0
