= 2012 Ginetta GT Supercup =

The 2012 Ginetta GT Supercup is a multi-event, one make GT motor racing championship held across England and Scotland. The championship features a mix of professional racing teams and privately funded drivers, competing in Ginetta G55 or Ginetta G50 cars that conform to the technical regulations. It forms part of the extensive program of support categories built around the BTCC centrepiece.

This season marks the second Ginetta GT Supercup, having rebranded from the Ginetta G50 Cup, which ran from 2008 to 2010.

== Teams and drivers ==
Team	No.	Drivers	Rounds
G55
TCR	3	(United Kingdom) Carl Breeze	4–10
TCR	71	(United Kingdom) Jamie Orton	4, 6–10
Tollbar Racing with WIRED	3	(United Kingdom) Carl Breeze	1–3
Tollbar Racing with WIRED	22	(United Kingdom) Jake Hill	4–10
Richardson Racing	5	(United Kingdom) Andrew Richardson	All
Richardson Racing	77	(United Kingdom) Mark Davies	10
Century Motorsport	7	(United Kingdom) Max Coates	10
Century Motorsport	26	(United Kingdom) Hunter Abbott	All
Century Motorsport	32	(United Kingdom) Freddie Hetherington	8–9
Century Motorsport	45	(United Kingdom) Josh Wakefield	1–6
Century Motorsport	73	(United Kingdom) Nathan Freke	7
Century Motorsport	91	(United Kingdom) Fergus Walkinshaw	All
IDL UK	10	(United Kingdom) Tom Sharp	All
Fauldsport	71	(United Kingdom) Jamie Orton	1–3
CWS	78	(United Kingdom) Colin White	All
JHR Developments	80	(United Kingdom) Tom Ingram	All
JHR Developments	95	(United Kingdom) Marcus Hoggarth	All
G50
Richardson Racing	2	(United Kingdom) Louise Richardson	1–3, 6
Richardson Racing	25	(United Kingdom) Giles Dawson	9
Richardson Racing	77	(United Kingdom) Mark Davies	1–9
Redbrick Racing	7	(United Kingdom) Max Coates	1–3, 5
Century Motorsport	14	(United Kingdom) Declan Jones	4, 7–10
Sherwood Racing	28	(United Kingdom) James Owen	1–6, 8
Meridian Motorsport	46	(United Kingdom) Robert Gaffney	All
HE Racing	88	(United Kingdom) Harry Cockill	8–10
Privateer	11	(Republic of Ireland) Connaire Finn	4, 10
Privateer	12	(United Kingdom) Reece Somerfield	1–2, 4–10
Privateer	13	(United Kingdom) Ian White	5
Privateer	52	(United Kingdom) Ian Parsons	1
Privateer	79	(United Kingdom) Dan Norris-Jones	10
Privateer	84	(United Kingdom) Brad Bailey	6

== Race calendar and results ==
The series will last for 27 races over 10 rounds, and will support the British Touring Car Championship at all rounds.

Round		Circuit	Date	Pole position	Fastest lap	Winning driver	Winning team
1	R1	Brands Hatch (Indy), Kent	31 March	(United Kingdom) Tom Sharp	(United Kingdom) Andrew Richardson	(United Kingdom) Tom Sharp	IDL UK
1	R2	Brands Hatch (Indy), Kent	1 April		(United Kingdom) Jamie Orton	(United Kingdom) Tom Sharp	IDL UK
1	R3	Brands Hatch (Indy), Kent	1 April		(United Kingdom) Tom Sharp	(United Kingdom) Tom Sharp	IDL UK
2	R4	Donington Park, Leicestershire	14 April	(United Kingdom) Tom Sharp	(United Kingdom) Tom Sharp	(United Kingdom) Tom Sharp	IDL UK
2	R5	Donington Park, Leicestershire	15 April		(United Kingdom) Colin White	(United Kingdom) Tom Sharp	IDL UK
2	R6	Donington Park, Leicestershire	15 April		(United Kingdom) Tom Sharp	(United Kingdom) Tom Ingram	JHR Developments
3	R7	Thruxton Circuit, Hampshire	28 April	(United Kingdom) Tom Sharp	(United Kingdom) Tom Sharp	(United Kingdom) Tom Sharp	IDL UK
3	R8	Thruxton Circuit, Hampshire	29 April		(United Kingdom) Tom Sharp	(United Kingdom) Tom Sharp	IDL UK
3	R9	Thruxton Circuit, Hampshire	29 April		(United Kingdom) Tom Sharp	(United Kingdom) Tom Sharp	IDL UK
4	R10	Oulton Park, Cheshire	9 June	(United Kingdom) Tom Ingram	(United Kingdom) Carl Breeze	(United Kingdom) Tom Ingram	JHR Developments
4	R11	Oulton Park, Cheshire	10 June		(United Kingdom) Tom Ingram	(United Kingdom) Tom Ingram	JHR Developments
5	R12	Croft Circuit, North Yorkshire	23 June	(United Kingdom) Tom Ingram	(United Kingdom) Carl Breeze	(United Kingdom) Carl Breeze	TCR
5	R13	Croft Circuit, North Yorkshire	24 June		(United Kingdom) Tom Ingram	(United Kingdom) Tom Ingram	JHR Developments
5	R14	Croft Circuit, North Yorkshire	24 June		(United Kingdom) Josh Wakefield	(United Kingdom) Tom Sharp	IDL UK
6	R15	Snetterton Motor Racing Circuit, Norfolk	11 August	(United Kingdom) Tom Ingram	(United Kingdom) Carl Breeze	(United Kingdom) Jake Hill	Tollbar Racing with WIRED
6	R16	Snetterton Motor Racing Circuit, Norfolk	12 August		(United Kingdom) Andrew Richardson	(United Kingdom) Carl Breeze	TCR
6	R17	Snetterton Motor Racing Circuit, Norfolk	12 August		(United Kingdom) Tom Ingram	(United Kingdom) Tom Sharp	IDL UK
7	R18	Knockhill Racing Circuit, Fife	25 August	(United Kingdom) Carl Breeze	(United Kingdom) Tom Ingram	(United Kingdom) Carl Breeze	TCR
7	R19	Knockhill Racing Circuit, Fife	26 August		(United Kingdom) Nathan Freke	(United Kingdom) Carl Breeze	TCR
7	R20	Knockhill Racing Circuit, Fife	26 August		(United Kingdom) Tom Sharp	(United Kingdom) Nathan Freke	Century Motorsport
8	R21	Rockingham Motor Speedway, Northamptonshire	22 September	(United Kingdom) Tom Ingram	(United Kingdom) Tom Ingram	(United Kingdom) Tom Ingram	JHR Developments
8	R22	Rockingham Motor Speedway, Northamptonshire	23 September		(United Kingdom) Andrew Richardson	(United Kingdom) Tom Ingram	JHR Developments
9	R23	Silverstone (National), Northamptonshire	6 October	(United Kingdom) Andrew Richardson	(United Kingdom) Andrew Richardson	(United Kingdom) Andrew Richardson	Richardson Racing
9	R24	Silverstone (National), Northamptonshire	7 October		(United Kingdom) Andrew Richardson	(United Kingdom) Carl Breeze	TCR
10	R25	Brands Hatch (GP), Kent	20 October	(United Kingdom) Mark Davies	(United Kingdom) Tom Ingram	(United Kingdom) Mark Davies	Richardson Racing
10	R26	Brands Hatch (GP), Kent	21 October		(United Kingdom) Tom Sharp	(United Kingdom) Mark Davies	Richardson Racing
10	R27	Brands Hatch (GP), Kent	21 October		(United Kingdom) Tom Sharp	(United Kingdom) Tom Sharp	IDL UK

== Championship standings ==
A driver's best 25 scores counted towards the championship, with any other points being discarded.

Pos	Driver	BHI			DON			THR			OUL		CRO			SNE			KNO			ROC		SIL		BHGP			Pen.	Pts
G55 Supercup
1	(United Kingdom) Carl Breeze	4	12	Ret	2	2	4	3	9	3	2	2	1	2	2	4	1	3	1	1	2	2	3	2	1	2	3	3		719
2	(United Kingdom) Tom Sharp	1	1	1	1	1	2	1	1	1	3	4	3	3	1	3	4	1	7	4	5	Ret	6	5	2	Ret	4	1	9	714
3	(United Kingdom) Tom Ingram	2	Ret	10	3	3	1	2	2	Ret	1	1	2	1	3	2	Ret	5	2	2	DNS	1	1	4	5	4	6	2		658
4	(United Kingdom) Andrew Richardson	8	Ret	3	Ret	NC	NC	4	4	12	Ret	Ret	5	5	4	5	3	2	3	6	4	7	2	1	4	Ret	2	4		469
5	(United Kingdom) Colin White	7	2	4	6	4	Ret	13	Ret	7	11	7	6	4	11	7	7	Ret	9	8	8	3	5	7	6	7	Ret	8	6	402
6	(United Kingdom) Hunter Abbott	5	5	Ret	5	12	3	6	11	4	4	3	12	6	8	17	9	6	Ret	Ret	6	Ret	16	6	8	8	8	12	6	386
7	(United Kingdom) Jake Hill										6	5	4	11	6	1	2	Ret	5	5	3	6	4	3	3	3	5	7	6	375
8	(United Kingdom) Fergus Walkinshaw	6	3	Ret	8	7	5	5	Ret	NC	8	10	7	10	Ret	10	6	Ret	11	Ret	7	Ret	8	8	7	6	10	5		322
9	(United Kingdom) Jamie Orton	Ret	4	2	7	Ret	7	8	DNS	DNS	5	6				6	5	4	6	7	11	Ret	7	Ret	DNS	DNS	NC	6	6	271
10	(United Kingdom) Marcus Hoggarth	11	Ret	5	13	5	11	14	8	9	9	9	9	Ret	12	14	8	Ret	12	Ret	Ret	Ret	Ret	10	9	14	7	9	6	270
11	(United Kingdom) Josh Wakefield	3	Ret	Ret	4	Ret	6	7	3	2	7	8	8	7	Ret	8	11	7												240
12	(United Kingdom) Nathan Freke																		4	3	1									84
13	(United Kingdom) Mark Davies																									1	1	10		82
14	(United Kingdom) Freddie Hetherington																					12	9	9	12					53
15	(United Kingdom) Max Coates																									5	9	16		41
G50 Cup
1	(United Kingdom) Mark Davies	9	9	7	10	8	9	9	5	8	10	11	11	8	5	9	10	8	8	9	DNS	4	13	11	11					766
2	(United Kingdom) Robert Gaffney	12	8	6	11	9	10	10	10	10	12	12	Ret	9	7	11	12	13	13	10	10	5	10	14	14	Ret	14	Ret		654
3	(United Kingdom) Reece Somerfield	14	Ret	Ret	12	10	13				15	14	15	14	Ret	16	15	10	14	12	9	11	11	13	13	10	Ret	11		475
4	(United Kingdom) James Owen	16	11	11	14	11	14	15	Ret	11	14	16	14	13	10	15	16	12				10	14							356
5	(United Kingdom) Declan Jones										Ret	13							10	11	DNS	8	15	12	10	9	12	14		285
6	(United Kingdom) Max Coates	15	6	Ret	9	6	8	12	7	6			10	Ret	Ret															272
7	(United Kingdom) Louise Richardson	10	10	9	Ret	Ret	12	11	6	5						13	13	11												258
8	(Republic of Ireland) Connaire Finn										13	15														12	13	15		116
9	(United Kingdom) Harry Cockill																					9	12	Ret	Ret	11	11	Ret		111
10	(United Kingdom) Ian Parsons	13	7	8																										79
11	(United Kingdom) Brad Bailey															12	14	9												78
12	(United Kingdom) Ian White												13	12	9															78
13	(United Kingdom) Dan Norris-Jones																									13	15	13		70
14	(United Kingdom) Giles Dawson																							15	15					40
Pos	Driver	BHI			DON			THR			OUL		CRO			SNE			KNO			ROC		SIL		BHGP			Pen.	Pts
