= Carl Breeze =

British racing driver (born 1979)

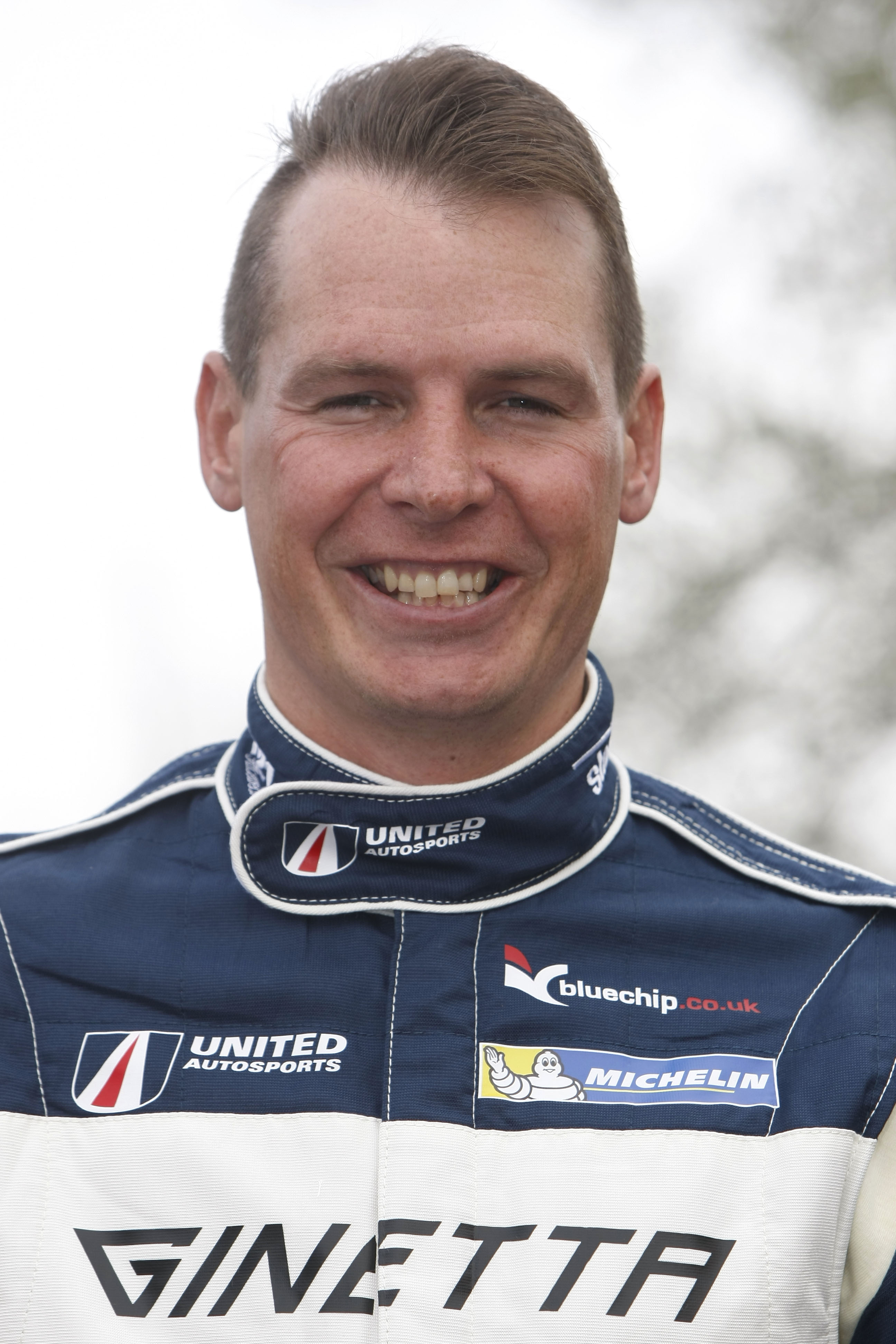
- Breeze in 2014
- Nationality: (United Kingdom) British
- Born: 7 July 1979 (age 47) Kings Lynn, England

Ginetta GT Supercup career
- Debut season: 2009
- Current team: Total Control Racing
- Car number: 3
- Former teams: Tollbar Racing with WIRED
- Starts: 112
- Wins: 29
- Poles: 11
- Fastest laps: 22
- Best finish: 1st in 2012

Previous series
- 2010 2010 2009–10 2005–08 2002–04 1999–2001 1998 1998 1996–97: Britcar 24hr GT4 European Cup; Ginetta G50 Cup; SEAT Cupra Championship; BTCC; Formula Renault UK; Formula Palmer Audi; French GT Championship; British Formula Ford

Championship titles
- 2001: Formula Renault UK

Carl Breeze (born 7 July 1979 in Kings Lynn) is a British auto racing driver. He is not to be confused with Hyla Breese, an Australian driver also with British Touring Car Championship experience. His racing heroes include Ayrton Senna, Nelson Piquet and Valentino Rossi. Breeze currently competes in the Ginetta GT Supercup.

== Career ==
=== Early years ===
Breeze won three major British karting titles before moving up to car racing. He began his car racing career in British Formula Ford with a best result of second in his debut season in 1996. For 1998, Breeze competed in Formula Palmer Audi and competed in two races in the French GT Championship before moving into Formula Renault for 1999. In 2001, he was champion, with results which were stronger than Kimi Räikkönen's the previous year, although unlike Räikkönen, he had experience of the championship and its circuits.

=== British Touring Car Championship ===
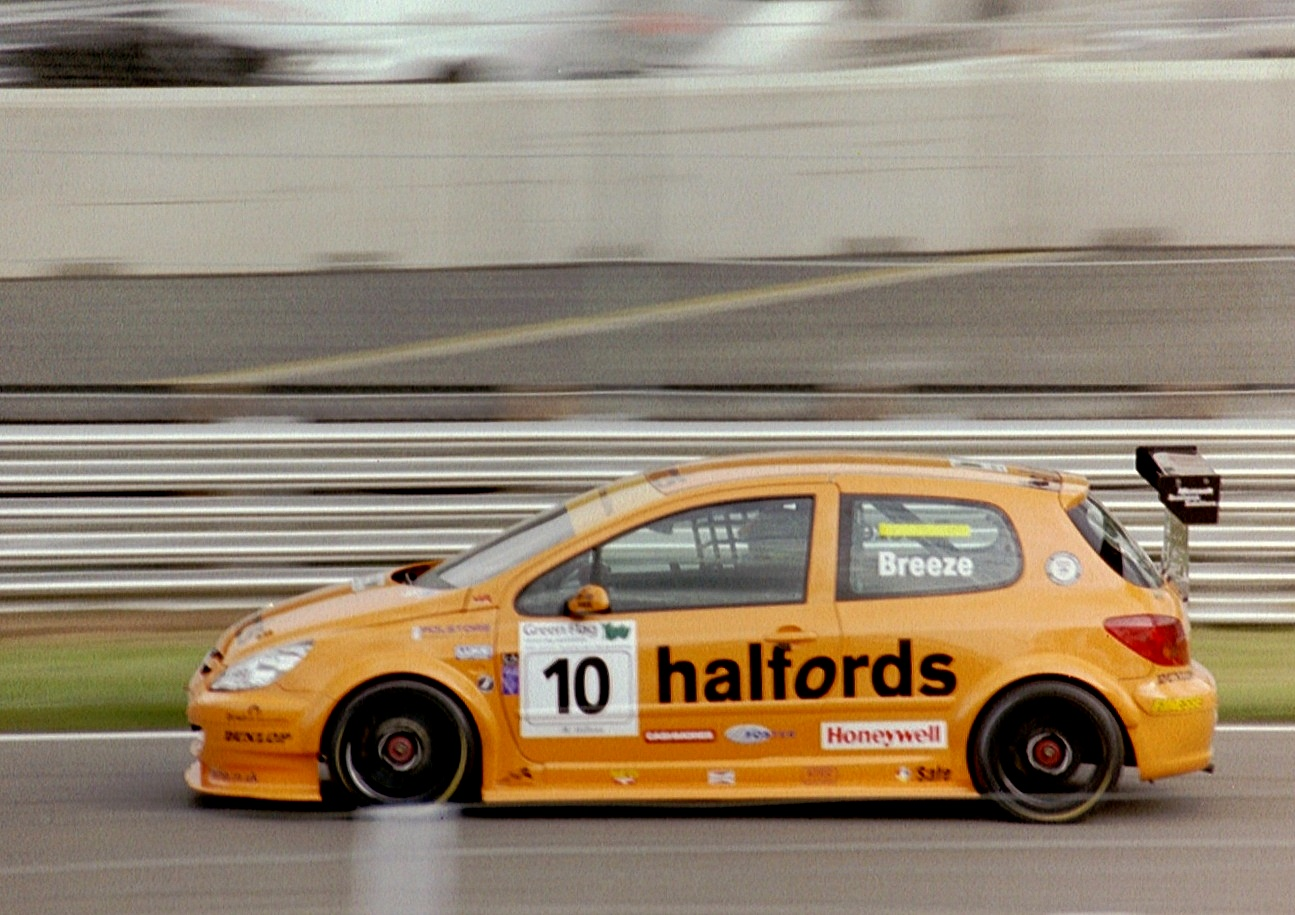
Breeze driving the Team Halfords Peugeot 307 at Brands Hatch during the 2003 British Touring Car Championship season.

Breeze made a move to tin-top racing in 2002, joining Vic Lee's team for rounds 4–10 of the BTCC in an independent Peugeot 406 Coupe. He signed for a full season in their self-developed Peugeot 307 in 2003, but moved to the GA team's Vauxhall Astra mid-season. He remained with the team for 2004 racing both the Astra and an Alfa Romeo, with an assortment of team-mates including Stefan Hodgetts, Kelvin Burt and Gavin Smith.

=== SEAT and Ginetta ===
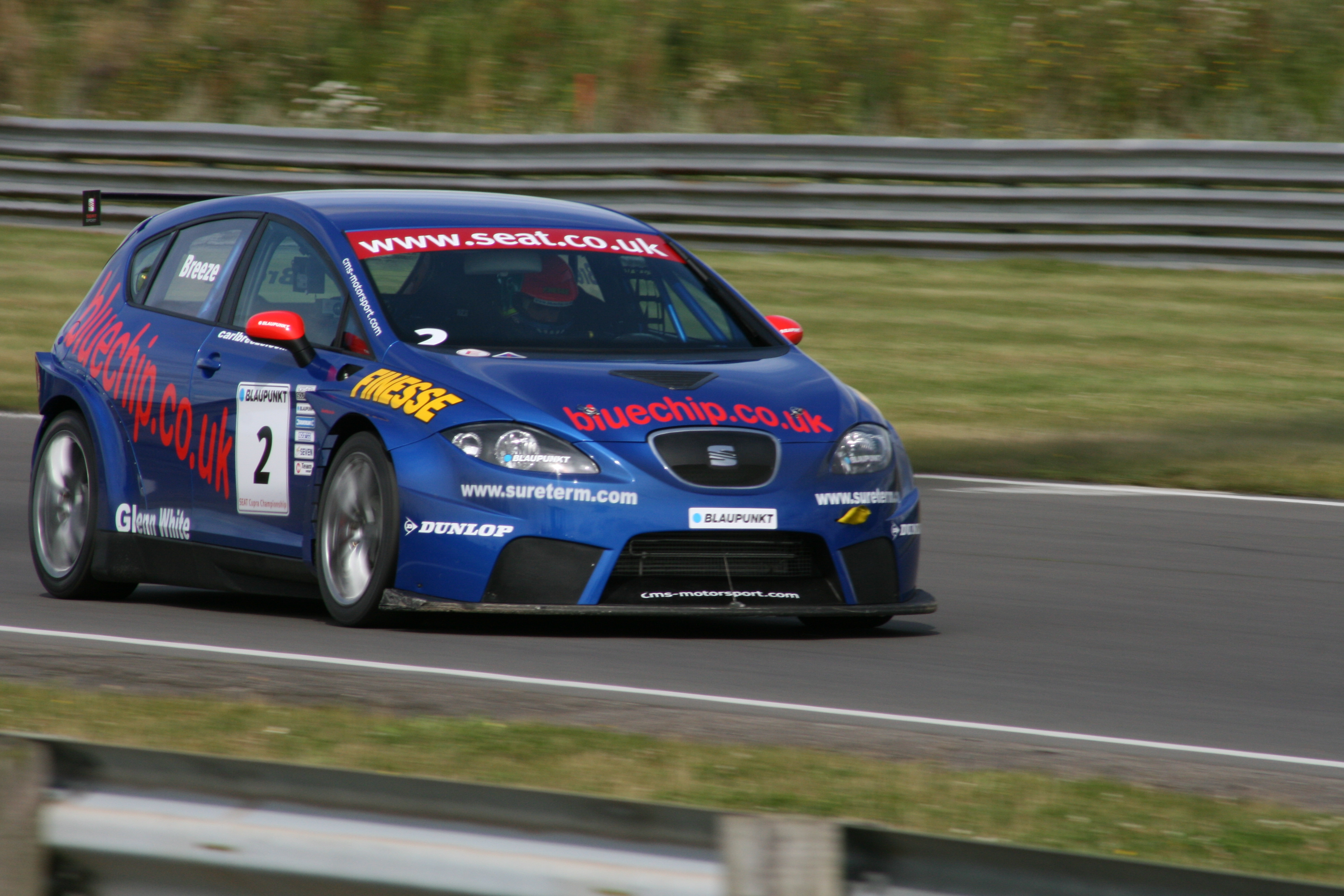
Breeze driving at Snetterton in the 2007 SEAT Cupra Championship.

For 2005, Breeze moved to the SEAT Cupra Championship with the Barwell team, finishing fourth overall with one with and ten podiums. For 2006, he raced for Edenbridge as team-mate to Tom Ferrier, and continued in the SEAT Cupra competition.

When SEAT ended the championship after the 2008 season, Breeze switched to the Ginetta G50 series in 2009 where he ended the year third in the driver standings – an impressive effort after sustaining a leg injury during an early-season race at Oulton Park. In 2010, he remained in Ginetta G50 and finished the season as Vice-Champion. Breeze also raced in one round of the GT4 European Cup in 2010 driving a Ginetta G50 GT4 with co-driver Frank Wrathall.

For 2011, the Ginetta G50 Cup became the Ginetta GT Supercup and Breeze challenged for the title again in the new Ginetta G55, but lost out by five points in the championship to Adam Morgan. He will continue to race in the Ginetta GT Supercup in 2012 racing for Tollbar Racing.

Breeze had a disastrous start to the 2012 season and the task looked near-impossible with a deficit of almost 120 points after just three rounds. With the title in mind, Breeze moved back to his old TCR team and put together a sensational campaign charge. A run of 18 podiums out of a possible 19, which included six wins saw Breeze secure the Championship in the last race of the season at Brands Hatch. Long time sponsor Blue Chip Customer Engineering Ltd have put together a 2012 season highlights page

In 2013, a last-minute deal meant that Breeze was able to return to defend his 2012 championship, remaining with TCR. A season-opening win at Brands Hatch Indy circuit saw the campaign get off to a good start, followed by two more wins at Donington Park in rounds 4 and 5.

At the third meeting of the season at Thruxton on 4/5 May, Breeze nearly scored maximum points by taking wins in rounds 7 and 8, and a second-place finish in round 9, having lost the lead of that race to Tom Ingram on the penultimate lap.

== Racing record ==
=== Complete British Touring Car Championship results ===
(key) Races in bold indicate pole position (1 point awarded – 2002 all races, 2003–2004 just for first race) Races in italics indicate fastest lap (1 point awarded all races) * signifies that driver lead race for at least one lap (1 point given – 2002 just in feature race, 2003–2004 all races)

Year	Team	Car	Class	1	2	3	4	5	6	7	8	9	10	11	12	13	14	15	16	17	18	19	20	21	22	23	24	25	26	27	28	29	30	Pen.	Pos	Pts
2002	Team Halfords	Peugeot 406 Coupé	T	BRH; 1	BRH; 2	OUL; 1	OUL; 2	THR; 1	THR; 2	SIL; 1 DNS	SIL; 2 ovr:16 cls:14	MON; 1 Ret	MON; 2 ovr:18 cls:12	CRO; 1 ovr:8 cls:8	CRO; 2 ovr:12* cls:12	SNE; 1 ovr:14 cls:14	SNE; 2 ovr:6 cls:6	KNO; 1 Ret	KNO; 2 ovr:14 cls:13	BRH; 1 Ret	BRH; 2 DNS	DON; 1 ovr:13 cls:13	DON; 2 ovr:7 cls:7											−5	17th	8
2003	Team Halfords	Peugeot 307	T	MON; 1 Ret	MON; 2 ovr:10 cls:10	BRH; 1 Ret	BRH; 2 ovr:10 cls:10	THR; 1 ovr:10 cls:10	THR; 2 Ret	SIL; 1 Ret	SIL; 2 DNS	ROC; 1 Ret	ROC; 2 ovr:9 cls:9																						13th	22
2003	GA Motorsport	Vauxhall Astra Coupé	T											CRO; 1 ovr:8 cls:8	CRO; 2 ovr:9 cls:9	SNE; 1 Ret	SNE; 2 ovr:7 cls:7	BRH; 1 ovr:10 cls:10	BRH; 2 ovr:15* cls:15	DON; 1 ovr:8 cls:8	DON; 2 ovr:8 cls:8	OUL; 1 ovr:15 cls:15	OUL; 2 ovr:11 cls:11												13th	22
2004	Team Sureterm GA Motorsports	Alfa Romeo 156		THR; 1 Ret	THR; 2 Ret	THR; 3; 11	BRH; 1 Ret	BRH; 2 DNS	BRH; 3 DNS	SIL; 1; 7	SIL; 2; 16	SIL; 3; 5	OUL; 1 Ret	OUL; 2; 13	OUL; 3 Ret	MON; 1; 11	MON; 2 Ret	MON; 3; 8	CRO; 1; 11	CRO; 2; 13	CRO; 3; 14	KNO; 1 Ret	KNO; 2 Ret	KNO; 3 DNS											15th	14
2004	Team Sureterm GA Motorsports	Vauxhall Astra Coupé																							BRH; 1; 13	BRH; 2; 12	BRH; 3; 10	SNE; 1; 14	SNE; 2 Ret	SNE; 3 Ret	DON; 1	DON; 2	DON; 3		15th	14

=== Complete Ginetta G50/GT/GT4 Supercup results ===
(key) (Races in bold indicate pole position – 1 point awarded just in first race; races in italics indicate fastest lap – 1 point awarded all races;-

Year	Team	Class	1	2	3	4	5	6	7	8	9	10	11	12	13	14	15	16	17	18	19	20	21	22	23	24	25	26	27	28	29	DC	Points
2009	Total Control Racing		BRH; 1; 1	**BRH**; **2**; 2	**BRH**; **3**; 1	THR; 1; 1	THR; 2; 3	THR; 3; 1	DON; 1; 4	DON; 2; 2	DON; 3; 2	**OUL**; **1**; 4	**OUL**; **2** C	CRO; 1; 2	CRO; 2 Ret	**CRO**; **3** DNS	**SNE**; **1**; 1	**SNE**; **2**; 1	**SNE**; **3**; 1	KNO; 1 Ret	KNO; 2; 4	KNO; 3; 3	SIL; 1; 4	SIL; 2; 3	SIL; 3; 16	ROC; 1; 4	ROC; 2 Ret	ROC; 2; 8	BHGP; 1; 7	BHGP; 2; 7	BHGP; 3; 8	3rd	629
2010	Total Control Racing		THR; 1; 5	THR; 2; 3	THR; 3; 4	ROC; 1; 2	ROC; 2; 1	ROC; 3; 2	**BHGP**; **1**; 1	**BHGP**; **2**; 1	BHGP; 3; 13	**OUL**; **1**; 1	**OUL**; **2**; 1	CRO; 1; 3	CRO; 2; 3	CRO; 3; 3	**SNE**; **1**; 1	**SNE**; **2**; 1	SNE; 3; 2	SIL; 1; 2	SIL; 2; 6	KNO; 1; 4	KNO; 2; 10	KNO; 3; 9	DON; 1; 13	DON; 2; 9	DON; 3; 3	BRH; 1; 1	**BRH**; **2**; 1	BRH; 3; 3		2nd	717
2011	Total Control Racing	G55	BHI; 1; 3	BHI; 2; 9	BHI; 3; 2	DON; 1; 2	DON; 2 NC	DON; 3; 3	**THR**; **1**; 1	**THR**; **2**; 2	THR; 3; 1	**OUL**; **1**; 2	OUL; 2; 3	CRO; 1; 4	CRO; 2; 5	**CRO**; **3**; 2	**SNE**; **1**; 1	**SNE**; **2**; 2	SNE; 3; 4	KNO; 1; 3	KNO; 2; 4	**KNO**; **3** Ret	**ROC**; **1**; 1	**ROC**; **2**; 14	**BRH**; **1**; 1	**BRH**; **2**; 1	BRH; 3; 5	SIL; 1; 3	SIL; 2; 4			2nd	689
2012	Tollbar Racing with WIRED	G55	BHI; 1; 4	BHI; 2; 12	BHI; 3 Ret	DON; 1; 2	DON; 2; 2	DON; 3; 4	THR; 1; 3	THR; 2; 9	THR; 3; 3																					1st	719
2012	Total Control Racing	G55										OUL; 1; 2	OUL; 3; 2	CRO; 1; 1	**CRO**; **2**; 2	CRO; 3; 2	SNE; 1; 4	SNE; 2; 1	SNE; 3; 3	**KNO**; **1**; 1	**KNO**; **2**; 1	KNO; 3; 2	ROC; 1; 2	ROC; 2; 3	SIL; 1; 2	SIL; 2; 1	BHGP; 1; 2	BHGP; 2; 3	BHGP; 3; 3			1st	719
2013	Total Control Racing	G55	BHI; 1; 1	**BHI**; **2**; 6	BHGP; 3 Ret	**DON**; **1**; 1	**DON**; **2**; 1	DON; 3 Ret	THR; 1; 1	**THR**; **2**; 1	THR; 3; 2	OUL; 1; 4	OUL; 2; 4	CRO; 1; 2	CRO; 2; 3	CRO; 3 Ret	SNE; 1; 2	SNE; 2; 1	SNE; 3; 4	KNO; 1; 3	KNO; 2; 3	KNO; 3; 4	ROC; 1; 8	ROC; 2; 7	SIL; 1; 7	SIL; 2; 3	BHGP; 1; 6	BHGP; 2; 3	BHGP; 3; 6			2nd	626
2014	United Autosports	Pro	BHI; 1; 4	BHI; 2 Ret	BHI; 3 Ret	DON; 1; 4	DON; 2; 4	DON; 3; 5	THR; 1; 2	THR; 2; 2	THR; 3; 5	OUL; 1; 2	OUL; 2; 6	CRO; 1; 1	**CRO**; **2**; 1	CRO; 3; 2	SNE; 1; 3	SNE; 2; 2	SNE; 3; 4	**KNO**; **1**; 1	**KNO**; **2**; 1	KNO; 3; 2	ROC; 1; 3	ROC; 2; 4	SIL; 1; 4	SIL; 2; 4	BHGP; 1; 9	BHGP; 2; 8	BHGP; 3 Ret			3rd	615
2015	HHC Motorsport	Pro	BHI; 1; 2	BHI; 2; 2	BHI; 3; 2	DON; 1; 3	DON; 2; 1	DON; 3; 5	**THR**; **1**; 1	**THR**; **2**; 1	THR; 3; 3	OUL; 1; 2	OUL; 2; 1	CRO; 1; 4	CRO; 2; 2	CRO; 3 Ret	SNE; 1 Ret	SNE; 2; 7	SNE; 3; 3	KNO; 1; 4	KNO; 2; 9	KNO; 3; 5	ROC; 1; 1	**ROC**; **2**; 1	SIL; 1; 3	SIL; 2; 4	**BHGP**; **1**; 1	**BHGP**; **2**; 1	BHGP; 3; 3			2nd	705

=== 24 Hours of Silverstone results ===
Year	Team	Co-Drivers	Car	Car No.	Class	Laps	Pos.	Class Pos.
2010	(United Kingdom) Strategic Racing / John Welch Motorsport	(Australia) Mark Pilatti (United Kingdom) Adam Christodoulou (United Kingdom) Luke Wright (United Kingdom) Aaron Williamson	SEAT Leon Supercopa	45	3	523	10th	6th

Sporting positions
Preceded by Kimi Räikkönen	Formula Renault UK; Champion; 2001	Succeeded by Danny Watts
Preceded by Adam Morgan	Ginetta GT Supercup; Champion; 2012	Succeeded by Tom Ingram
