= Tim Bevan (racing driver) =

English racing driver

Tim Bevan (1976–2007) was a racing driver from Water Orton, Birmingham, England, in the SEAT Cupra Challenge. He finished the 2006 season 17th with 16 points. He was killed in a road accident in August 2007.
