= Alan Blencowe =

British racing driver (born 1976)

- Nationality: (United Kingdom) British
- Debut season: 1999 750 motorclub stock hatch Championship
- Teams: 2000 SVE 2001 SVE / Tim Norton 2002 GA Motorsport 2003 Barwell Motorsport 2004 Barwell Motorsport 2005 Barwell Motorsport 2006 Triple R 2007 Triple R 2008 Synchro Motorsport (Honda Factory Swindon)
- Championships: 9
- Wins: 7
- Podiums: 53
- Poles: 7
- Fastest laps: 8 +lap record knockhill seat 2006

Alan Blencowe is a British auto racing driver. He started racing in the 750MC Stock Hatch Series in 1999, winning one race and finishing fourth in the championship driving a Peugeot 205 GTI. In 2000 he raced in the Ford Fiesta Zetec Championship finishing fifth in the championship and also becoming the winter series champion. He stayed in the series for another year, this time finishing fourth in the championship.

For 2002, Blencowe made the move up to the BTCC with Gary Ayles Motorsport in the Production class. His debut weekend didn't turn out well when the second driver on the team collided with him in race 1 and was taken out of race two by another competitor while running in third place. Over the course of the season, he picked up four Production class podiums, his best result a second place at Thruxton and eventually finishing seventh in the Production class championship. He moved to the Barwell Motorsport team in 2003 and despite only taking one Production class win, his consistency of 18 podiums and only one DNF took him to second in the BTCC Production class championship.

In 2004, Blencowe had to make the move over to the Britcar Endurance season as sponsorship was hard to find and again driving for Barwell Motorsport in a Honda Civic Type-R, taking two class wins in the four races he competed in also always being the fastest driver out of the two or sometimes three drivers that competed in the same car. For 2005, he moved to the SEAT Cupra Championship, finishing third four times and taking fifth in the championship. In 2006, he finished second in the championship, again his consistency playing part with only one win but ten podium finishes and one lap record at Knockhill. At the end of 2006, Blencowe was asked to test for the Seat factory team at Rockingham after his impressive season in the Seat Cupra Cup. He stayed at Triple R for one more year driving the new SEAT León, winning two races before he left the series after a huge accident at Snetterton Motor Racing Circuit caused by the pole sitter.

In 2008, Blencowe was asked to drive for Synchro Motorsport (Honda factory Swindon) which he did for two races until the car caught fire at Snetterton after an oil leak and burnt the car out.

Blencowe now works as a professional driver for Lamborghini when required and he also provides one to one driver coaching all over the UK for personal clients.

== Racing record ==
=== Complete British Touring Car Championship results ===
(key) (Races in bold indicate pole position in class - 1 point awarded 2002 all races, 2003 just in first race) (Races in italics indicate fastest lapin class - 1 point awarded all races)

Year	Team	Car	Class	1	2	3	4	5	6	7	8	9	10	11	12	13	14	15	16	17	18	19	20	DC	Pts	Class
2002	GA Motorsport	Alfa Romeo 156	P	BRH; 1 Ret	BRH; 2 Ret	OUL; 1 ovr:14 cls:3	OUL; 2 Ret	THR; 1 Ret	THR; 2 ovr:13 cls:2	SIL; 1 ovr:21 cls:9	SIL; 2 ovr:18 cls:4	MON; 1 ovr:15 cls:5	MON; 2 ovr:17 cls:6	CRO; 1 ovr:13 cls:3	CRO; 2 Ret	SNE; 1 Ret	SNE; 2 ovr:20 cls:8	KNO; 1 ovr:18 cls:6	KNO; 2 ovr:21 cls:8	BRH; 1 ovr:19 cls:7	BRH; 2 ovr:18 cls:6	DON; 1 Ret	DON; 2 Ret	N/A	76	7th
2003	Barwell Motorsport	Honda Civic Type-R	P	MON; 1 ovr:8 cls:2	MON; 2 Ret	BRH; 1 ovr:17 cls:4	BRH; 2 ovr:15 cls:5	THR; 1 ovr:15 cls:3	THR; 2 ovr:15 cls:4	SIL; 1 ovr:13 cls:3	SIL; 2 ovr:12 cls:2	ROC; 1 ovr:14 cls:2	ROC; 2 ovr:12 cls:2	CRO; 1 ovr:15 cls:2	CRO; 2 ovr:16 cls:3	SNE; 1 ovr:12 cls:3	SNE; 2 ovr:15 cls:3	BRH; 1 ovr:19 cls:3	BRH; 2 ovr:20 cls:5	DON; 1 ovr:16 cls:3	DON; 2 ovr:18 cls:2	OUL; 1 ovr:16 cls:1	**OUL**; **2** ovr:17 cls:5	N/A	**193**	**2nd**
