= Mat Jackson =

British racing driver (born 1981)

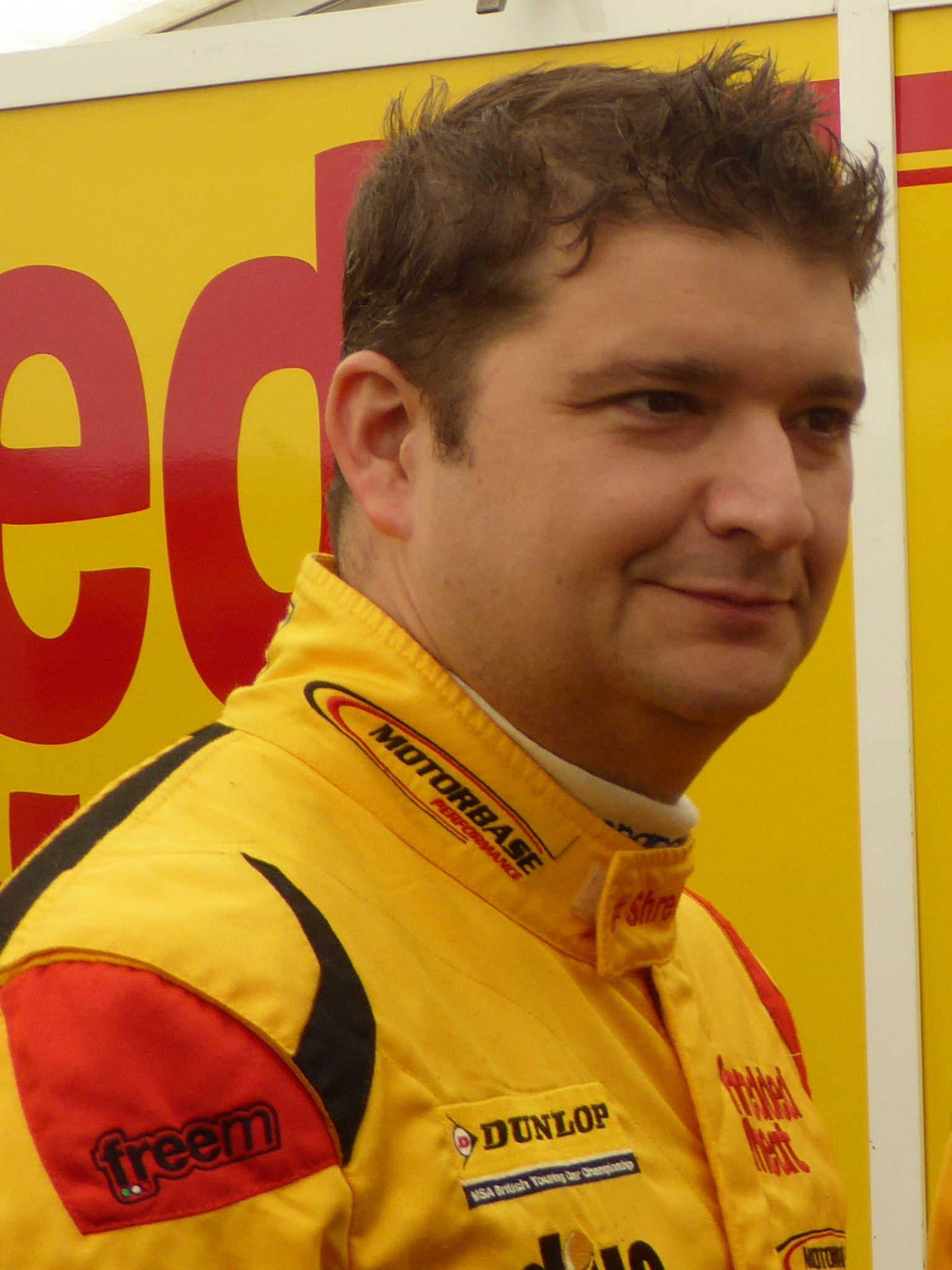
- Jackson, at the Knockhill round of the 2017 British Touring Car Championship
- Nationality: (United Kingdom) British
- Born: Mathew Jackson; 10 June 1981 (age 45) Henley-in-Arden, Warwickshire, England

British Touring Car Championship career
- Debut season: 2001
- Former teams: Team Shredded Wheat Racing with Gallagher; Racing Silverline; Jacksons M.Sport; GR Motorsport
- Starts: 334
- Wins: 31
- Poles: 5
- Fastest laps: 24
- Best finish: 2nd in 2008

Previous series
- 2018 2015 2005–06 2000: Britcar Endurance; British GT Championship; SEAT Cupra Championship; Renault Clio Cup

Championship titles
- 2006: SEAT Cupra Championship

Mathew Jackson (born 10 June 1981) is a British former racing driver.

== Racing career ==
=== Early years ===
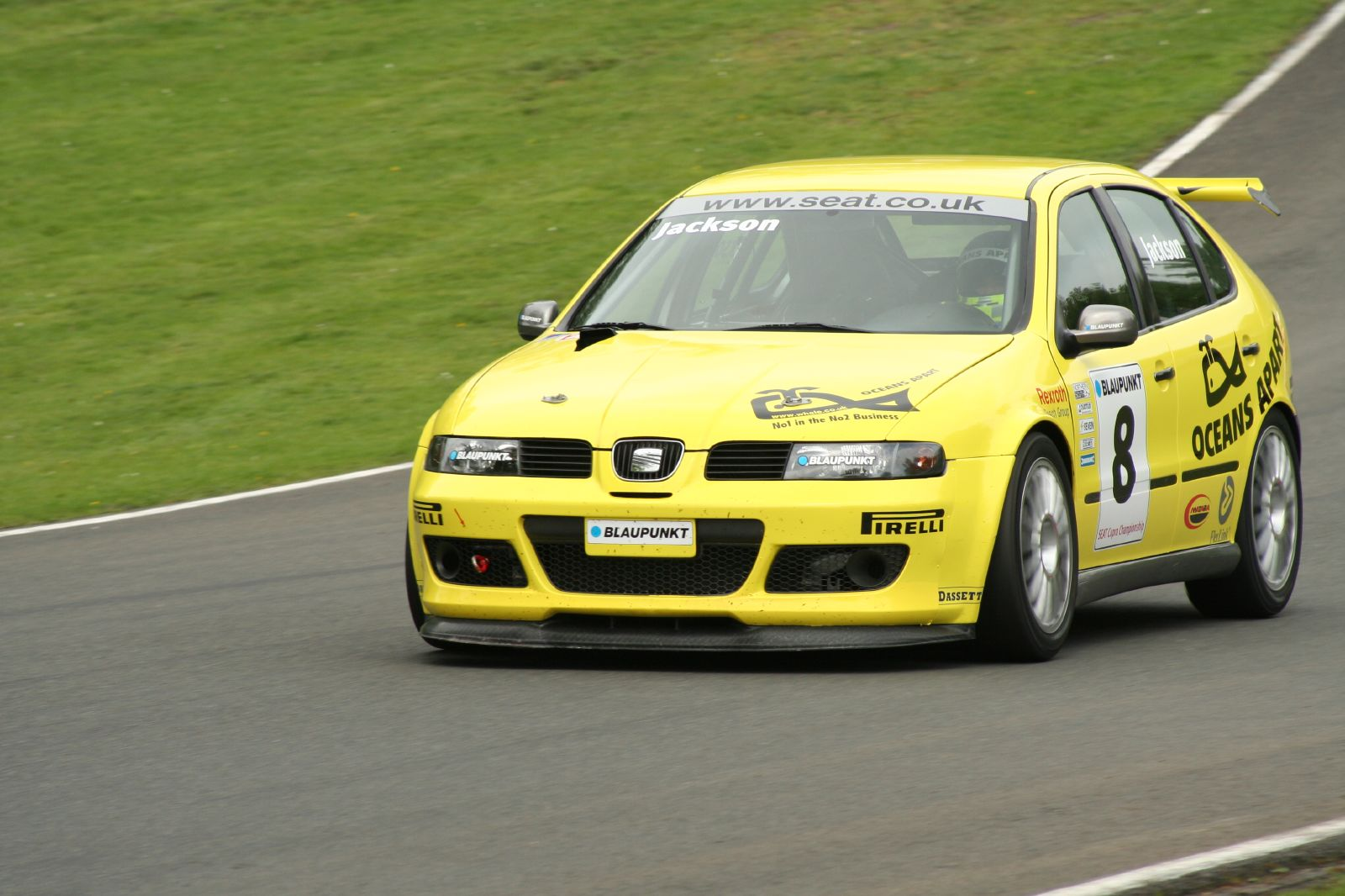
Jackson driving at the Oulton Park of the 2006 SEAT Cupra Championship.

Born in Henley-in-Arden, Warwickshire, Jackson started racing in karts in his teens, before finishing fourth in the 2000 Renault Clio Cup, his first attempt at tin-top racing. For 2001, he moved to the production class of the British Touring Car Championship with the GR team's Ford Focus, finishing fourth in his class. He struggled for funding in subsequent years, and was something of a forgotten man when he entered the SEAT Cupra Championship in 2005 with a family-run team. He was a revelation however, finishing as series runner-up, with a series-high eight race wins, and a tally of eight poles and eight fastest laps. After being considered by SEAT for a BTCC drive , he remained in Cupras for 2006, taking the championship lead after a double victory at the season opener. A string of nine wins in the first 12 races made him strong championship favourite, and he went on to clinch the title.

=== British Touring Car Championship ===
==== Jacksons M.Sport (2007–2008) ====
Jackson was a frontrunner in the 2007 BTCC season, clinching many podium places before his first victory at Oulton Park in race three . Thruxton did not go well for him, a crash and an engine failure leaving him with no points . His home round at Donington saw him start fourth and briefly lead race one, before fading down the order as the wet conditions did not suit his rear-wheel drive BMW. At the second Brands Hatch meeting he attempted to make an overtaking move at the first turn (around the outside) and spun, triggering an 11-car pile-up, leaving two drivers in hospital. At the final rounds at Thruxton, Jackson showed pace and won the final race of the series. While everyone was focusing on the Fabrizio Giovanardi v Jason Plato title battle, Jackson snuck inside Tom Coronel at the start of the third race. He managed to hold Team RAC driver Colin Turkington behind him to win his second BTCC race of the season also securing his seventh place in the standings.

Jackson stayed with the team for 2008. At the first round at Brands Hatch, Jackson started at the pole position and led for over 3/4 of the race until rain started to fall and he lost grip in his BMW. He was overtaken by VX Racing's Giovanardi shortly before the end and had to settle for second place. In the second race he battled for fourth place, and in the third race he fought his way through the field for a second-place finish behind the Team RAC BMW 320si of Turkington.

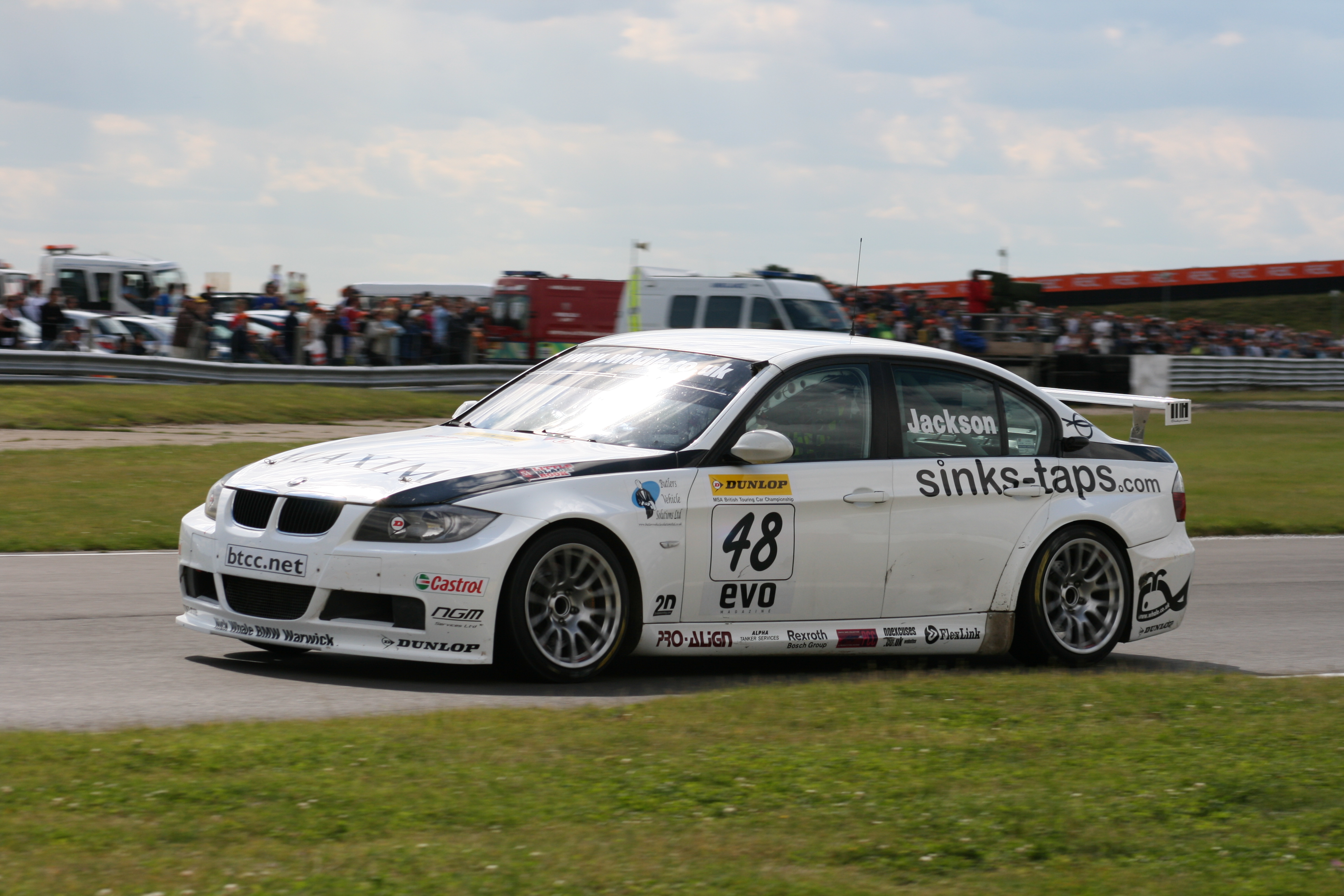
Jackson driving his family-run BMW 320si at the Snetterton round of the 2007 British Touring Car Championship season.

At Rockingham, Jackson started the weekend tenth on the grid but fought his way up to sixth place. In the second race he got a good start and quickly took the lead after mistakes by SEAT driver Darren Turner and Giovanardi, and recorded his third career victory. In the third race, which was delayed by rain, Jackson managed to fight his way up to second behind Turkington, despite his RWD BMW 320si slipping in the conditions. All was going well, with Jackson closely following Turkington, until an ambitious overtaking move around the outside resulted in him being pushed out wide and into the gravel trap. Jackson recorded a DNF and lost his chance of taking the championship lead. At Donington Park, he qualified 14th on the grid for the first race, Jackson drove through the field making his way up to 5th place. His race ended when contact was made with Team Dynamics driver Tom Chilton. In the third race he managed to get his first points of the weekend with a solid eighth-place finish.

At Croft, Jackson qualified a decent seventh on the grid, race 1 took place in atrocious weather, pouring rain causing there to be rivers and puddles all over the track. From the start, he flew into an early lead, but the race had to be red flagged after an accident between Team RAC driver Stephen Jelley and Robertshaw Racing driver Alan Taylor caused an injury to a marshal. The race was restarted but the weather had become worse. Jackson restarted second on the grid but flew into the lead at the first corner. This meant he was the first to enter the treacherous Tower corner, which resulted in him locking his brakes and going straight on. He went through the gravel trap, but managed to return to the pack in a lowly 18th place. He stayed there though as another red flag was brought out and the race stopped due to the poor weather. He finished the 2008 season second in the championship, 36 points behind Fabrizio Giovanardi.

==== RML (2009) ====
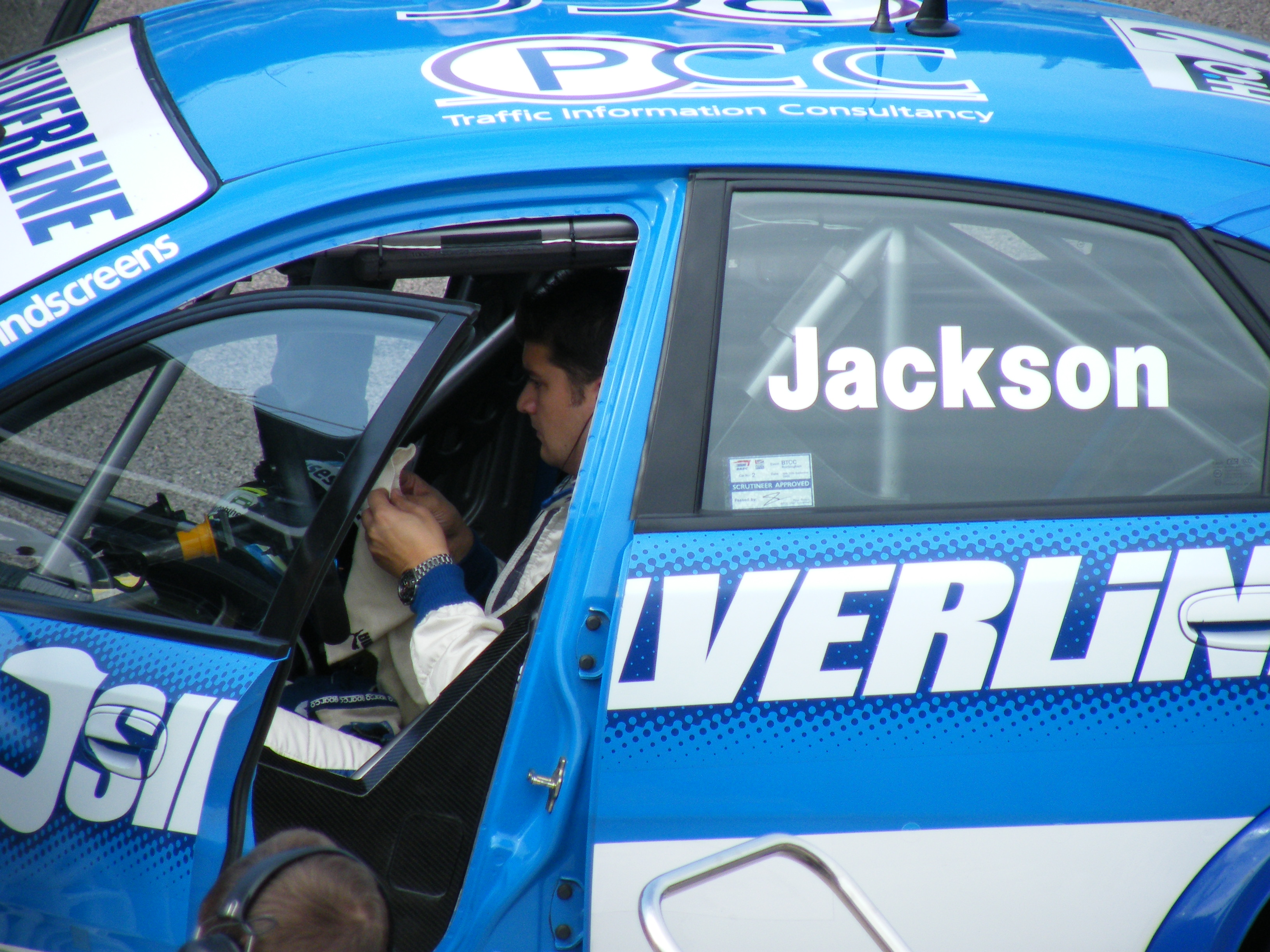
Jackson in his RML Chevrolet at Rockingham Motor Speedway in 2009 preparing for the race start

Following the pullout of a key sponsor, Jackson's own team did not have the funds to run their car in 2009. Mat was not listed on the 2009 entry list for the BTCC, leaving his plans for the season unclear. However, he returned to the BTCC in a one off race for RML in a Chevrolet Lacetti at Thruxton, winning in the final race of the day. He was later then confirmed to race the rest of the season for RML under the Sliverline Racing banner alongside Jason Plato. He generally struggled in the first half of the season, before a run of eight successive podium finishes (a record in the era of reverse-grid races) including a win at Knockhill and pole position at Silverstone took him to fifth in the standings.

==== Motorbase Performance (2010–2017) ====
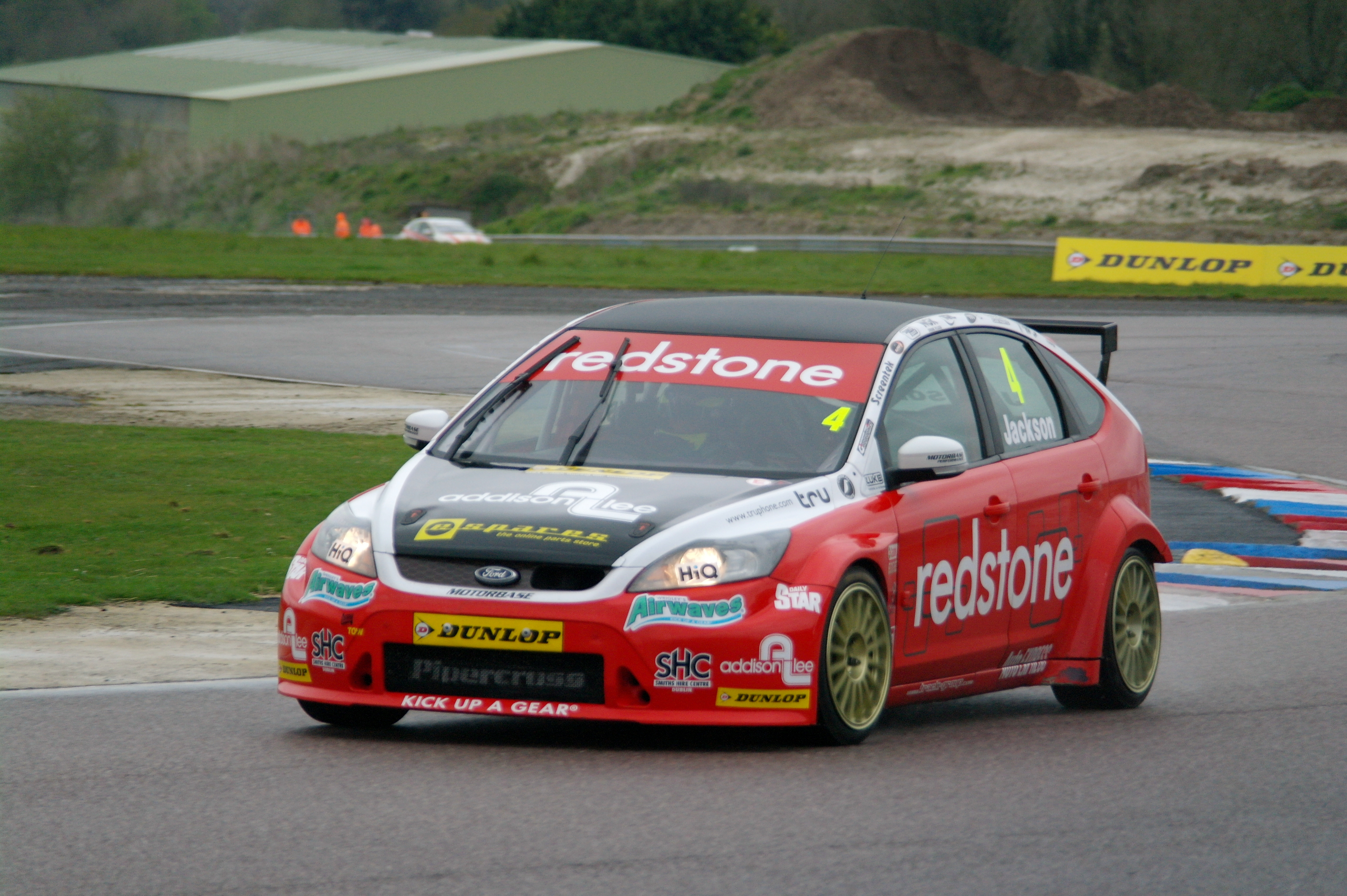
Jackson driving for Redstone Racing at Thruxton in the 2012 BTCC season.

Jackson was signed by Airwaves BMW for the 2010 season. He managed to win round nine at Brands Hatch and collected six podiums over the course of the season, finishing 7th in the final standings with a total of 155 points, 14 points behind teammate Steven Kane.

For the 2011 season, Jackson stayed with Airwaves Racing. The team no longer ran the BMW 320si but instead competed with the Ford Focus ST for him and rookie teammate Liam Griffin. The cars were acquired from Team Aon and used the same Mountune NGTC engine as the Team Aon cars. In this season, he returned to the front of the field, battling Gordon Shedden and Matt Neal for the championship, winning races at Donington, Oulton Park, Croft and Snetterton. He went away from Snetterton as the championship leader but poor results for the rest of the season put him out of contention, he finished fourth in the Drivers Standings.

Jackson stayed with Motorbase for 2012, now rebranded as Redstone Racing. He won the first race at Donington Park and he won the third race until he was disqualified for running over the turbo boost limit. He had a bad day at Oulton Park, making contact with Rob Collard in race two and giving them both punctures. He then spun Daniel Welch into retirement in the third race of the day, Jackson was penalised for both incidents. At Snetterton he switched to the brand new NGTC Ford Focus ST Mk.III and took the first victory for the car at Silverstone having started from 17th place.

Jackson continued to race for Motorbase until 2017 in the NGTC Ford Focus ST, winning many races and finishing third in the series in 2016, but also missing half of the 2015 series due to Motorbase losing a major sponsor.

=== Departure from Motorbase and subsequent hiatus ===
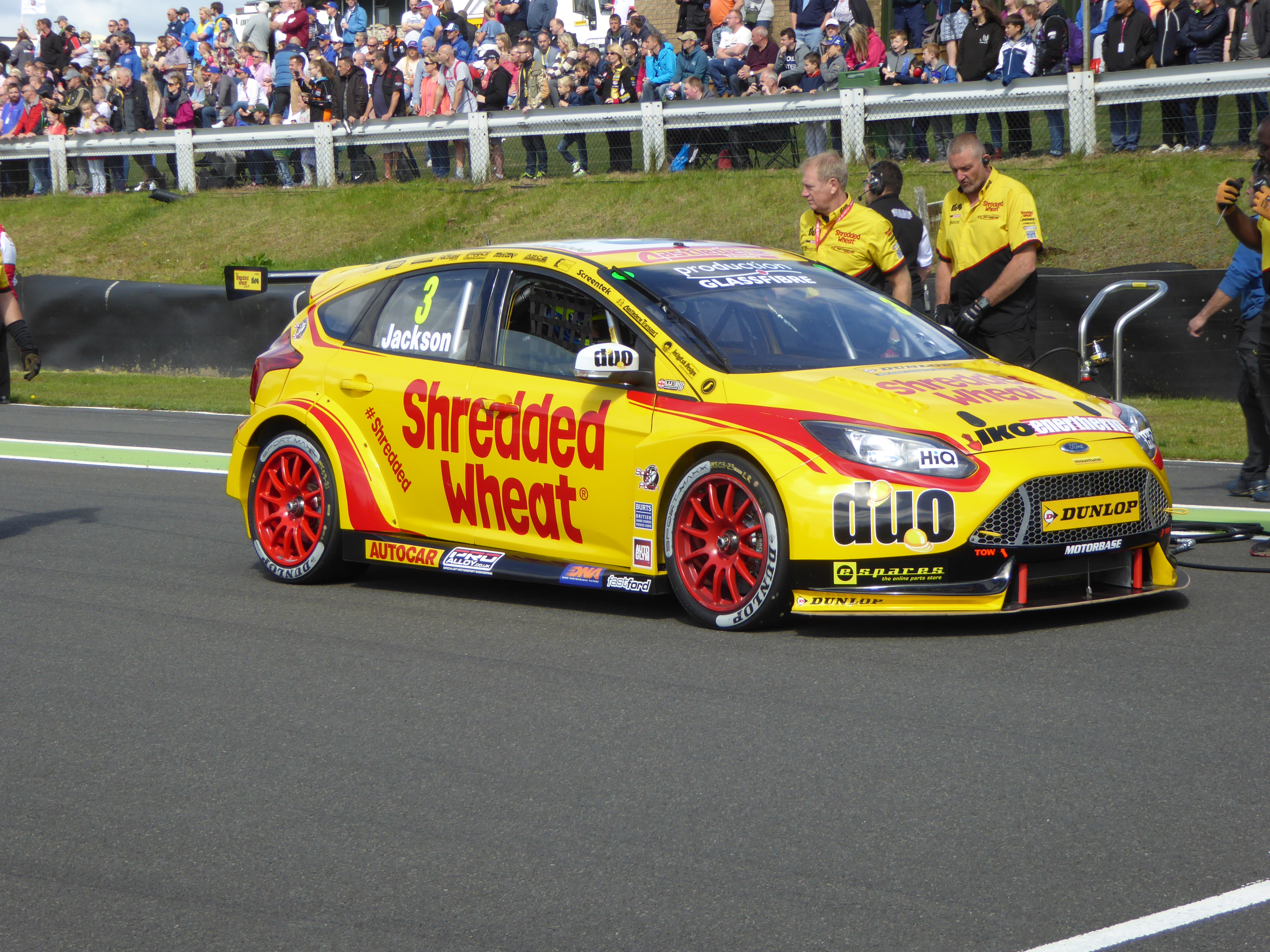
Jackson, at the Knockhill round of the 2017 British Touring Car Championship.

Jackson was announced at the Autosport International Show as one of the drivers for Motorbase heading into 2018, and was set to partner Tom Chilton in what would have been a formidable line up in the now upgraded NGTC Focus RS. However, on 18 February 2018, the team announced they had split with Mat and he would no longer be driving for them. Although reasons behind the split are unknown, Jackson had been heavily linked to the Team Dynamics Honda seat vacated by Gordon Shedden, it is unknown how close to the drive Mat got, and tensions over contractual disputes have been suggested as the main reasoning with Motorbase boss Dave Bartrum referencing loyalty and commitment in a string of press releases. The timing of his departure appeared calculated on Motorbase's part as the Team Dynamics Honda seat was then taken by Dan Cammish, leaving Jackson without a drive for 2018.

In a rare outing in 2018, Jackson raced with former-BTCC driver Stewart Lines in the Dunlop Endurance Championship in a SEAT Cupra TCR for Maximum Motorsport at round three at Oulton Park in June. They failed to finish the first race completing only 15 laps and in they were later disqualified from race two.

=== Aborted return to BTCC with Power Maxed Racing ===
On 5 February 2020, it was announced Jackson would return to the BTCC for the upcoming season with Power Maxed Racing, having been linked to a number of teams during his two year sabbatical. Due to the COVID-19 pandemic, Power Maxed Racing's plans changed for the delayed season and Mat was left without a drive.

=== Other activities ===
Jackson has business ventures, such as family run business's car dealership Jackson's Ford and Cotswold Luxe.

Jackson has appeared three times on BBC's Top Gear, firstly racing a motorhome in Series 10, Episode 6. He then raced an Aircraft tug in the airport vehicles race in Series 14, Episode 4. He appeared again in Series 20, Episode 2 when he drove a Toyota HiAce in a taxi race.

Jackson is a test and development driver for McLaren Automotive, having worked on the McLaren MP4-12C.

== Racing record ==
=== Complete British Touring Car Championship results ===
(key) Races in bold indicate pole position (1 point awarded – 2001 all races, 2007–present just in first race, 2001 in class) Races in italics indicate fastest lap (1 point awarded – 2001–present all races, 2001 in class) * signifies that driver lead race for at least one lap (1 point awarded – 2001 just in feature races, 2007–present all races, 2001 for leading in class)

Year	Team	Car	Class	1	2	3	4	5	6	7	8	9	10	11	12	13	14	15	16	17	18	19	20	21	22	23	24	25	26	27	28	29	30	DC	Pts	Class
2001	GR Motorsport	Ford Focus	P	BRH; 1; 4†	BRH; 2 ovr:9 cls:3	THR; 1 ovr:10 cls:6	THR; 2 ovr:8 cls:3	OUL; 1 ovr:12 cls:8	OUL; 2 Ret	SIL; 1 ovr:8 cls:4	SIL; 2 Ret	MON; 1 ovr:11 cls:6	MON; 2 ovr:7 cls:3	DON; 1 ovr:10 cls:3	DON; 2 ovr:6* cls:1	KNO; 1 Ret	KNO; 2 Ret	SNE; 1 ovr:7 cls:4	SNE; 2 ovr:9 cls:3	CRO; 1 ovr:16 cls:10	CRO; 2 ovr:7 cls:2	OUL; 1 ovr:10 cls:4	OUL; 2 ovr:13 cls:7	SIL; 1 ovr:8 cls:4	SIL; 2 Ret	DON; 1 Ret	DON; 2 ovr:9* cls:3	BRH; 1 ovr:11 cls:3	BRH; 2 ovr:12 cls:8					N/A	151	4th
2007	Jacksons M.Sport	BMW 320si		BRH; 1 DSQ	BRH; 2; 8	BRH; 3; 3	ROC; 1; 10	ROC; 2; 4	ROC; 3; 2	THR; 1 Ret	THR; 2 Ret	THR; 3 DNS	CRO; 1; 9	CRO; 2; 4	CRO; 3; 3	OUL; 1; 5	OUL; 2; 6	OUL; 3; 1*	DON; 1; 9	DON; 2; 10	DON; 3; 4	SNE; 1; 4	SNE; 2; 5	SNE; 3; 7	BRH; 1 Ret	BRH; 2; 4	BRH; 3; 3	KNO; 1 Ret	KNO; 2; 10	KNO; 3; 9	THR; 1; 7	THR; 2; 5	THR; 3; 1*	7th	158	
2008	BMW Dealer Team UK	BMW 320si		**BRH**; **1**; 2*	BRH; 2; 4	BRH; 3; 2	ROC; 1; 6	ROC; 2; 1*	ROC; 3 Ret	DON; 1 Ret	DON; 2; 11	DON; 3; 8	THR; 1; 5	THR; 2; 5	THR; 3; 2	CRO; 1; 18*	CRO; 2; 2	CRO; 3; 5	SNE; 1; 15	SNE; 2; 7	SNE; 3; 1*	OUL; 1; 12	OUL; 2; 5	OUL; 3; 4	KNO; 1; 6	KNO; 2; 5	KNO; 3; 4	SIL; 1; 2	SIL; 2; 13*	SIL; 3; 1*	BRH; 1; 1*	**BRH**; **2**; 1*	BRH; 3; 4	**2nd**	**226**	
2009	RML	Chevrolet Lacetti		BRH; 1	BRH; 2	BRH; 3	THR; 1; 8	THR; 2; 9	THR; 3; 1*																									5th	165	
2009	Racing Silverline	Chevrolet Lacetti								DON; 1; 10	DON; 2; 6	DON; 3; 4	OUL; 1; 19	OUL; 2 Ret	OUL; 3; 8	CRO; 1 Ret	CRO; 2 DNS	CRO; 3 DNS	SNE; 1; 2	SNE; 2 NC	SNE; 3 DNS	KNO; 1; 3	KNO; 2; 2	KNO; 3; 1*	**SIL**; **1**; 1*	**SIL**; **2**; 3*	SIL; 3; 1*	ROC; 1; 3	ROC; 2; 2*	ROC; 3; 5	BRH; 1; 12	BRH; 2; 12	BRH; 3; 11	5th	165	
2010	Airwaves BMW	BMW 320si		THR; 1; 3	THR; 2; 5	THR; 3; 2	ROC; 1; 13	ROC; 2; 4	ROC; 3 Ret	BRH; 1; 10	BRH; 2; 11	BRH; 3; 1*	OUL; 1; 4	OUL; 2; 4	OUL; 3; 7	CRO; 1; 9	CRO; 2 Ret	CRO; 3; 7	SNE; 1; 2	SNE; 2; 5	SNE; 3; 7	SIL; 1; 13	SIL; 2; 10	SIL; 3; 3	KNO; 1; 10	KNO; 2; 6	KNO; 3; 5	DON; 1; 3	DON; 2; 5	DON; 3; 8	BRH; 1; 13	BRH; 2; 8	BRH; 3; 4	7th	155	
2011	Airwaves Racing	Ford Focus ST		BRH; 1; 4	BRH; 2; 3	BRH; 3; 2	DON; 1; 5	DON; 2; 10	DON; 3; 1*	THR; 1; 6	THR; 2; 5	THR; 3; 2	OUL; 1 Ret	OUL; 2; 9	**OUL**; **3**; 1*	CRO; 1; 2	CRO; 2; 5	CRO; 3; 1*	SNE; 1; 6	SNE; 2; 6	SNE; 3; 1*	KNO; 1; 19	KNO; 2 Ret	KNO; 3 Ret	ROC; 1 Ret	ROC; 2 Ret	ROC; 3; 13	BRH; 1; 2	BRH; 2; 2	BRH; 3; 5	SIL; 1; 20	SIL; 2; 26	SIL; 3; 21	4th	191	
2012	Redstone Racing	Ford Focus ST Mk.II		BRH; 1; 7	BRH; 2; 4	BRH; 3 Ret	DON; 1; 1*	**DON**; **2**; 3*	DON; 3 DSQ	THR; 1; 1*	**THR**; **2**; 3*	THR; 3; 6	OUL; 1; 5	OUL; 2 Ret	OUL; 3; 7	CRO; 1; 8	CRO; 2 NC	CRO; 3; 12																7th	274	
2012	Redstone Racing	Ford Focus ST Mk.III																	SNE; 1; 8	SNE; 2; 6	SNE; 3; 4	KNO; 1; 5	KNO; 2 Ret	KNO; 3; 10	ROC; 1; 4	ROC; 2; 4	ROC; 3; 6	SIL; 1 Ret*	SIL; 2; 1*	SIL; 3; 2	BRH; 1 Ret	BRH; 2; 7	**BRH**; **3** Ret*	7th	274	
2013	Airwaves Racing	Ford Focus ST Mk.III		BRH; 1; 20	BRH; 2; 7	**BRH**; **3**; 10*	DON; 1; 12	DON; 2; 13	DON; 3; 9	THR; 1; 7	THR; 2; 15	THR; 3; 7	OUL; 1; 7	OUL; 2; 20	OUL; 3; 19	CRO; 1 Ret	CRO; 2 Ret	CRO; 3; 13	SNE; 1; 8	SNE; 2; 4	SNE; 3; 2	KNO; 1; 12	KNO; 2; 9	KNO; 3; 7	ROC; 1; 2	ROC; 2; 4	ROC; 3; 4	SIL; 1; 9	SIL; 2; 10	SIL; 3; 4	BRH; 1; 9	BRH; 2; 3	BRH; 3; 3	8th	225	
2014	Airwaves Racing	Ford Focus ST Mk.III		BRH; 1; 15	BRH; 2; 12	BRH; 3; 7	DON; 1; 14	DON; 2; 7	DON; 3; 4	THR; 1; 4	THR; 2; 5	THR; 3; 2	OUL; 1; 7	OUL; 2; 6	OUL; 3; 9	CRO; 1; 8	CRO; 2; 6	CRO; 3; 3	SNE; 1; 8	SNE; 2; 6	SNE; 3; 2	KNO; 1; 4	KNO; 2; 1*	KNO; 3; 17	ROC; 1; 9	ROC; 2; 7	ROC; 3; 5	SIL; 1; 3	SIL; 2; 4	SIL; 3; 1*	BRH; 1; 4	BRH; 2; 11	BRH; 3; 3	4th	316	
2015	Motorbase Performance	Ford Focus ST		BRH; 1	BRH; 2	BRH; 3	DON; 1	DON; 2	DON; 3	THR; 1	THR; 2	THR; 3	OUL; 1	OUL; 2	OUL; 3	CRO; 1	CRO; 2	CRO; 3	SNE; 1; 12	SNE; 2; 8	SNE; 3; 6	KNO; 1; 2*	**KNO**; **2**; 3*	KNO; 3; 9	**ROC**; **1**; 1*	ROC; 2; 2	ROC; 3; 14	**SIL**; **1**; 1*	**SIL**; **2**; 24*	SIL; 3; 7	**BRH**; **1**; 1*	**BRH**; **2**; 1*	BRH; 3; 2	12th	200	
2016	Motorbase Performance	Ford Focus ST		BRH; 1; 8	BRH; 2; 5	BRH; 3; 25	DON; 1; 1*	**DON**; **2**; 2*	DON; 3; 14	THR; 1; 21	THR; 2; 8	THR; 3; 1*	OUL; 1; 16	OUL; 2; 10	OUL; 3; 13	CRO; 1; 8	CRO; 2; 6	CRO; 3 Ret	SNE; 1; 3	SNE; 2; 1*	SNE; 3 Ret	KNO; 1; 12	KNO; 2; 6	**KNO**; **3**; 1*	ROC; 1; 2	ROC; 2; 4*	ROC; 3; 5	SIL; 1; 17	SIL; 2; 6	SIL; 3; 2	BRH; 1; 11	BRH; 2; 7	**BRH**; **3**; 1*	3rd	292	
2017	Team Shredded Wheat Racing with Duo	Ford Focus ST		BRH; 1; 8	BRH; 2; 5	BRH; 3; 13	DON; 1; 11	DON; 2 Ret	DON; 3 Ret	THR; 1; 8	THR; 2; 20	THR; 3; 14	OUL; 1; 6	OUL; 2; 7	OUL; 3 Ret	CRO; 1; 3	CRO; 2; 7	CRO; 3; 1*	SNE; 1; 11	SNE; 2; 4	SNE; 3; 4	KNO; 1 Ret	KNO; 2; 16	KNO; 3; 7	ROC; 1; 7	ROC; 2; 2	ROC; 3; 15	SIL; 1; 24	SIL; 2 Ret	SIL; 3; 10	BRH; 1; 4	BRH; 2; 4	BRH; 3; 7	8th	210	

† Event with 2 races staged for the different classes.

=== Complete British GT Championship results ===
(key)

Year	Team	Car	Class	1	2	3	4	5	6	7	8	9	DC	Points
2015	Oman Racing Team	Aston Martin V12 Vantage GT3	GT3	OUL; 1; 4	OUL; 2; 10	ROC; 1	SIL; 1	SPA; 1	BRH; 1	SNE; 1	SNE; 2	DON; 1	19th	13

=== Complete Britcar results ===
(key) (Races in bold indicate pole position in class – 1 point awarded just in first race; races in italics indicate fastest lap in class – 1 point awarded all races;-

Year	Team	Car	Class	1	2	3	4	5	6	7	8	9	10	11	12	13	14	DC	CP	Points
2018	Maximum Motorsport	CUPRA León TCR	E4	ROC; 1	ROC; 2	SIL; 1	SIL; 2	**OUL**; **1** Ret	OUL; 2 DSQ	DON; 1	DON; 2	SNE; 1	SNE; 2	SIL; 1	SIL; 2	BRH; 1	BRH; 2	5th	2nd	180

Sporting positions
Preceded by Tom Boardman	SEAT Cupra Championship; 2006	Succeeded by Jonathan Adam
