= SEAT Cupra Championship =

Auto racing series in the United Kingdom

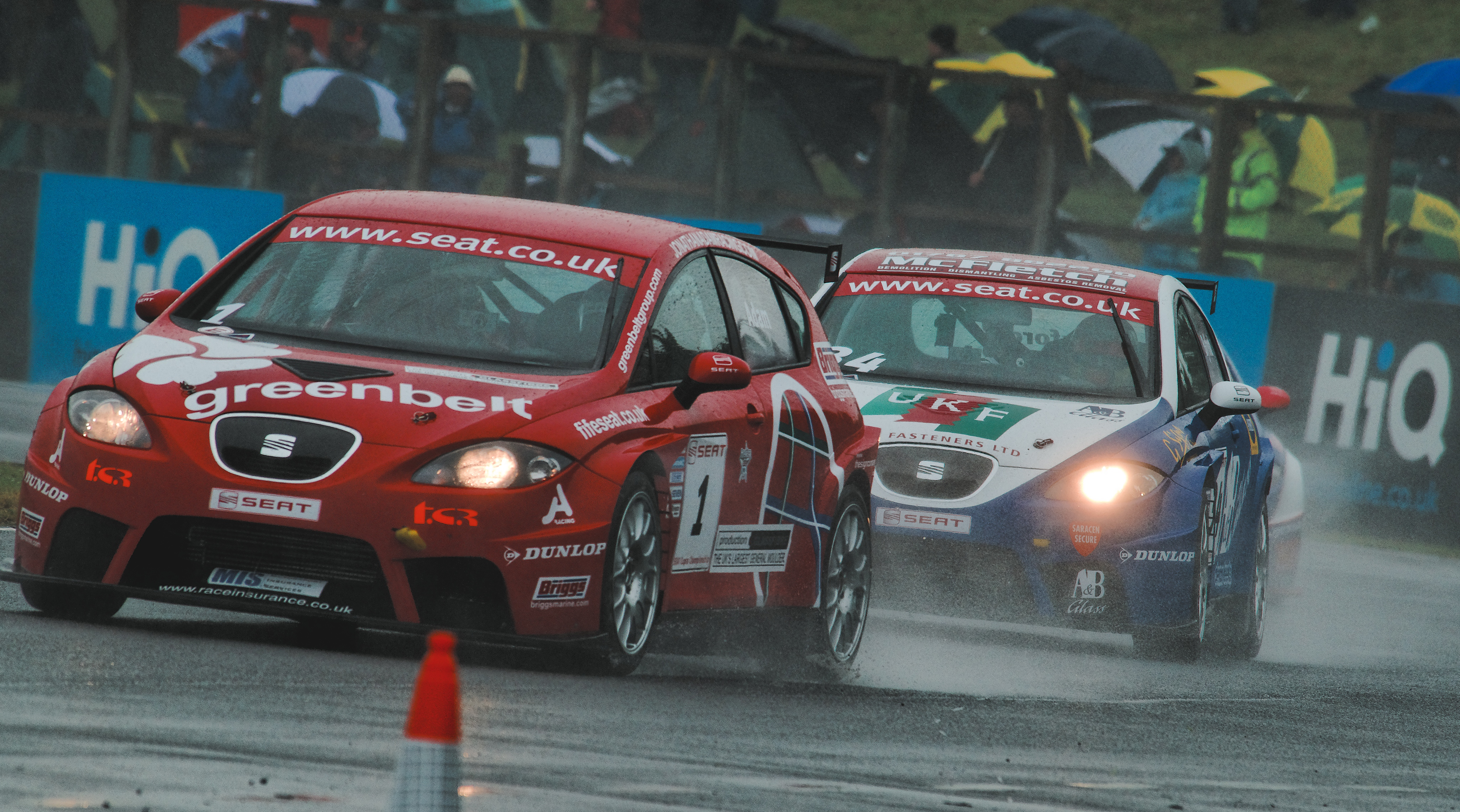
- 2007 SEAT Cupra Champion Jonathan Adam defending his title in 2008
- Category: One make Touring car racing by SEAT
- Country: United Kingdom
- Inaugural season: 2003
- Folded: 2008
- Constructors: SEAT
- Last Drivers' champion: (United Kingdom) Jonathan Adam (2008)
- Last Teams' champion: (United Kingdom) Total Control Racing (2008)
- Official website: seatsportuk.co.uk

The SEAT Cupra Championship was a one-make series that ran for six years between 2003 and 2008, the last five of which ran as a support package to the British Touring Car Championship.

Originally the prize for winning the championship was a drive for the SEAT works team in the BTCC. From 2005 and onwards this changed to a £100,000 cheque.

Throughout the championship's six years, 78 drivers competed. It established itself as one of the main routes into topline Touring Car racing, and drivers went on to do well in either the BTCC or World Touring Car Championship. Past contenders such as Rob Huff, Mat Jackson, James Pickford, Emmet O'Brien and Gordon Shedden mean that tin top fans keep a close eye on these cars and drivers for the next big racing talent.

== The Cars ==
2007 SEAT León Cupra of Fulvio Mussi

The cars driven were the SEAT León Cupra. Engine sizes moved from a 1.8 L (first generation Cupra R) to the second generation León with a 2.0 L engine in 2007. The engines use an inline four cylinder layout and are paired with a six speed gearbox. Prices for new entrants are £40,000 plus VAT directly from SEAT. SEAT estimate the total budget for running a car to be between £60,000 and £100,000.

== History ==
=== 2003 Season ===
The inaugural meeting for the Holiday Inn SEAT Cupra Championship was held at the Croft Circuit, with a strong 17 car grid (including three female drivers). All cars were being prepared by one team to make racing more even. Stefan Hodgetts claimed the first ever victory. Eventual championship winner Rob Huff went on to win race two. Both these drivers would battle it out to the fifth and final championship meeting of the season at Thruxton along with Gordon Shedden who finished second, and Gavin Smith who came in fourth place behind Hodgetts. Huff's prize was a full works drive in the BTCC for SEAT Sport UK. A prize which launched a very successful career in the world of touring cars.

=== 2004 Season ===
Again, first prize would be a drive in the 2005 BTCC season. James Pickford and Gavin Smith shared wins in the first races at Brands Hatch. Tom Boardman and Gavin Smith won races 3 and 4 at Silverstone, giving Smith an early championship lead. It was James Pickford who was consistently finishing in high positions including 2 more wins at Oulton Park and Croft who won a closely fought championship with 151 points.

A late surge in the standings saw Oli Wilkinson finish second, just 5 points off Pickford with 146. Tom Boardman was third with 133 points, Gordon Shedden fourth with 123 and Gavin Smith fifth with 98 points.

=== 2005 Season ===
2005 saw the season have an expansion to 18 rounds compared to last years 12 rounds plus a new name, the Smartnav SEAT Cupra Championship. Cars were now entered by independent teams rather than SEAT themselves, meaning less performance parity but involving more people in the series

This was Tom Boardman's year, as he made a good start to the season winning both opening rounds at Donington, and going on to get 7 race wins in total for the year. Mat Jackson got a total of 8 wins including some superb performances at Snetterton and Knockhill. In the end he was always playing catch up to the more consistent finishing of Boardman, who won overall on 260 points. Jackson finished in second on 245 points. third was Tom Ferrier on 219 points, fourth was Carl Breeze on 191 points and fifth was Alan Blencowe who finished on 116.

=== 2006 Season ===
Despite the SEAT Cupra champion Tom Boardman not getting the works drive for 2005, the rules remained unchanged meaning he was not allowed to stay and defend his title. There was still a healthy grid with 22 entrants for 2006 and a new sponsorship deal, creating the Blaupunkt SEAT Cupra Championship. It was Mat Jackson, who carried on his good form and show of ability by winning the first three races. He went on to dominate the championship winning 11 out of the 18 rounds.

With a lot of new faces for 2006, the nearest any one got to Mat's total of 273 points was Alan Blencowe with 225. Following them in the final points standing were new boys, Jonathan Adam in third with 218 points, Fulvio Mussi in fourth with 169 points and Ben Winrow in fifth with 166 points. Jackson used his £100,000 prize to buy the WTCC winning car used by Andy Priaulx to enter his own Jackson Motorsport team as an independent in the BTCC for 2007.

=== 2007 Season ===
This year saw a restructuring of the championship, with the introduction of the new model SEAT León. This created a two tier system incorporating the new cars with the old ones running in a Cupra R class. A total of 28 drivers entered.

The championship was dominated by Scottish driver Jonathan Adam, who won winning 9 of the 20 races. An exciting first race of the year saw a win for Carl Breeze with Adam right behind him at the line. A good start to race 2 and a very comfortable victory for Adam followed. His impressive driving continued, winning 4 out of the next 6 at Rockingham, Thruxton and Croft.

One of the more interesting meetings were rounds 11 and 12 at Donington, where the drivers were greeted with terrible weather conditions. Victims included Carl Breeze and Oli Wilkinson. The race was red flagged and restarted, but by round 12 we had a very depleted grid of 14 cars. Champion Adam ended the season with a huge total of 302 points. Fulvio Mussi was half a point ahead of third placed Carl Breeze with 204.5 and 204 respectively. Behind them were Neil Waterworth fourth with 177.5 points and Daniel Welch ending the season strong to finish fifth with 153.5 points.

The Leon Cupra R class was won by Harry Vaulkhard with 267 points. Ian Churchill was second on 263 points ahead of older brother Adrian on 248.5 points. Freddy Nordstrom was fourth with 222 points and Mike Doble fifth with 171.5 points.

=== 2008 Season ===
The field was much smaller for 2008, with the R Class gone and only 12-14 cars entering most meetings. Robert Lawson and reigning Renault Clio Cup champion Martin Byford were notable additions who were immediately on the pace. A change of rules meant that Adam was allowed to defend his title, although Mussi and Waterworth did not return. Lawson dominated the first half of the season, but Adam came back at him to lead the standings going into the final round. Lawson finished the season scoring the most points, but the result remained provisional as Lawson awaited the result of an appeal. He was thrown out of qualifying at Silverstone for an illegal camber angle, which had been bent out by an earlier escapade across the kerbs bending his wheel rim. Seat harshly stripped him of 32 championship points and put him to the back of the grid and Lawson lodged an immediate appeal. With bent parts changed Lawson beat Adam in the race taking victory. Due to Seat Sports shock withdrawal from motorsport and based on a financial decision with his sponsors Lawson elected not to take the unappealing first prize of a drive in Seats Touring Car, but to take the second prize of a brand new Seat race car and the cash prize. He withdrew his appeal which meant that Adam completed back-to-back titles.

== Champions ==
All champions were British-registered.

Season	Driver	Team	Points
2003	Rob Huff	Northern South	122
2004	James Pickford	Northern South	151
2005	Tom Boardman	Special Tuning UK	265
2006	Mat Jackson	Jackson Motorsport	273
2007	Jonathan Adam	Total Control Racing	309
2007	Harry Vaulkhard	Volkis Boozers/Triple R (Cupra R Class)	267
2008	Jonathan Adam	Total Control Racing	301
