= Tom Ferrier =

British racing driver (born 1981)

- Nationality: (United Kingdom) British
- Born: 14 November 1981 (age 44) Bletchingley, Surrey, England

British Touring Car Championship
- Years active: 2000–2001, 2006–2007
- Teams: GA Motorsport; JS Motorsport; Motorbase Performance
- Starts: 24
- Wins: 0
- Poles: 0
- Fastest laps: 0
- Best finish: 10th in 2001

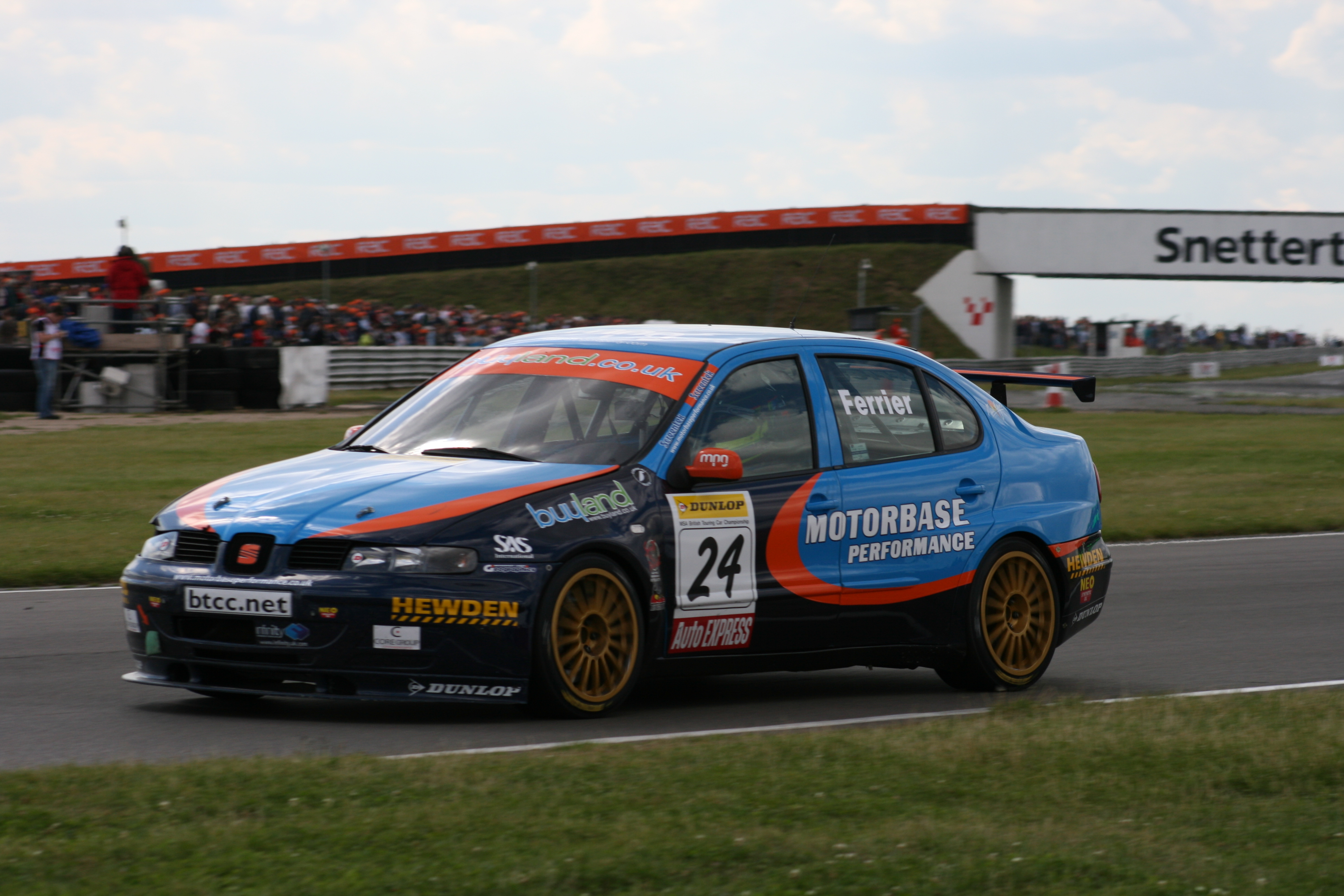
Ferrier driving the Motorbase-run SEAT Toledo at the Snetterton round of the 2007 British Touring Car Championship season.

Tom Ferrier (born 14 November 1981) is a British racing driver. He had a long running karting career, a milestone was winning the 1998 British Championship. He also won the Star Cup of the Formula Renault Championship the following year, before switching to more entertaining and less competitive saloon cars. He is the founder of TF Sport.

Ferrier captured two wins in the Renault Clio Winter series. In 2000 he was a competitor at the national Saloon Championship as well as some Class B BTCC races (the two series have closely related car classes) in an Alfa Romeo 156 prepared by Gary Ayles' team. For 2001, he originally signed to drive for Vauxhall in the Touring class, but he lost his seat to Phil Bennett who brought more funding and turned down a drive in a fourth Astra that would have been run by Tech-Speed Motorsport as a satellite team. He chose to race in both the European Super Production Championship and the BTCC. In Europe, he was ranked 12th of the field. Ferrier achieved number two ranking in the Under 25 Cup. In Britain he ranked tenth overall driving a JSM Alfa Romeo 147 in place of original signing Darren Malkin after the latter's sponsorship deal fell through prior to the start of the season. At Donington Park, Ferrier led the field, but succumbed to an engine failure while running in second place.

For the 2002 season, Ferrier focused on the European Touring Car Championship (ETCC), driving a DART Racing Alfa Romeo 156. His pit-support crew was from Alfa Romeo UK. In 2005 Ferrier was a frontrunner at SEAT Cupra Championship. Ferrier was nominated for a place in the 2004 BTCC by Carly Motors alongside countryman and driver James Hanson, but this was not to be. Ferrier participated in some Caterham races in 2004. Ferrier returned to the BTCC just two weeks before the final round of 2006, driving a SEAT Toledo bought by Motorbase Performance. Despite almost no time in the car before the weekend, he had two points finishes. Ferrier also made the British GT Championship races in 2006.

Beginning in 2007, Ferrier drove in the British GT Championship, for Tech 9 sharing with Phil Quaife. Midseason he rejoined Motorbase for the BTCC. Heavy rain at that debut counted against him but he scored points at Snetterton. Involvement in the huge pile-up in race 1 at Brands Hatch eliminated him from the rest of that meeting, and the team opted to skip the next meeting at Knockhill to concentrate on the season finale at Thruxton. It was ultimately Paul O'Neill who was at the helm in that final meeting of the season.

In 2009, Ferrier competed in rounds of the Time Attack series in a Subaru Impreza at the Time attack series hosted by Zen Performance.

Starting in 2011, Ferrier and former BTCC driver Danny Buxton formed Scuderia Vittoria. They entered teams in both the AirAsia Renault Clio Cup (4x Renault Clio Cup Cars) and the British GT (1x Ginetta G50, 1x Ferrari 458 Italia GT). At the conclusion of 2011, their debut season, Ferrier and Buxton had achieved 14 wins overall in both classes,

== Racing record ==
=== Complete British Touring Car Championship results ===
(key) Races in bold indicate pole position (1 point awarded 2000–2001 all races, 2006–2007 just for first race, 2000–2001 in class) Races in italics indicate fastest lap (1 point awarded 2001, 2006–2007 all races, 2000–2001 in class) * signifies that driver lead race for at least one lap (1 point awarded – 2001 just for feature race, 2006–2007 all races)

Year	Team	Car	Class	1	2	3	4	5	6	7	8	9	10	11	12	13	14	15	16	17	18	19	20	21	22	23	24	25	26	27	28	29	30	Pos	Pts	Class
2000	Gary Ayles Motorsport	Alfa Romeo 156	B	BRH; 1	BRH; 2	DON; 1	DON; 2	THR; 1	THR; 2	KNO; 1	KNO; 2	OUL; 1	OUL; 2	SIL; 1	SIL; 2	CRO; 1	CRO; 2	SNE; 1	SNE; 2	DON; 1	DON; 2	BRH; 1 ovr:13 cls:3	BRH; 2 ovr:14 cls:4	OUL; 1 Ret	OUL; 2 Ret	SIL; 1 Ret	SIL; 2 DNS							N/A	18	8th
2001	JS Motorsport	Alfa Romeo 147	T	BRH; 1	BRH; 2	THR; 1 Ret	THR; 2 DNS	OUL; 1	OUL; 2	SIL; 1	SIL; 2	MON; 1	MON; 2	DON; 1	DON; 2	KNO; 1 Ret	KNO; 2 DNS	SNE; 1 Ret	SNE; 2 DNS	CRO; 1 ovr:20 cls:8	CRO; 2 Ret	OUL; 1	OUL; 2	SIL; 1	SIL; 2	DON; 1 ovr:12 cls:6	DON; 2 Ret*	BRH; 1 Ret	BRH; 2 ovr:4 cls:4					10th	20	
2006	Motorbase Performance	SEAT Toledo Cupra		BRH; 1	BRH; 2	BRH; 3	MON; 1	MON; 2	MON; 3	OUL; 1	OUL; 2	OUL; 3	THR; 1	THR; 2	THR; 3	CRO; 1	CRO; 2	CRO; 3	DON; 1	DON; 2	DON; 3	SNE; 1	SNE; 2	SNE; 3	KNO; 1	KNO; 2	KNO; 3	BRH; 1	BRH; 2	BRH; 3	SIL; 1; 12	SIL; 2; 7	SIL; 3; 8	19th	7	
2007	Motorbase Performance	SEAT Toledo Cupra		BRH; 1	BRH; 2	BRH; 3	ROC; 1	ROC; 2	ROC; 3	THR; 1	THR; 2	THR; 3	CRO; 1	CRO; 2	CRO; 3	OUL; 1	OUL; 2	OUL; 3	DON; 1 Ret	DON; 2; 14	DON; 3; 12	SNE; 1; 9	SNE; 2 Ret	SNE; 3; 12	BRH; 1 Ret	BRH; 2 DNS	BRH; 3 DNS	KNO; 1	KNO; 2	KNO; 3	THR; 1	THR; 2	THR; 3	22nd	2	

=== Complete European Touring Car Championship results ===
(key) (Races in bold indicate pole position) (Races in italics indicate fastest lap)

Year	Team	Car	1	2	3	4	5	6	7	8	9	10	11	12	13	14	15	16	17	18	19	20	DC	Pts
2002	DART Racing	Alfa Romeo 156 GTA	MAG; 1 Ret	MAG; 2; 14†	SIL; 1 Ret	SIL; 2 DNS	BRN; 1; 13	BRN; 2; 12	JAR; 1; 13	JAR; 2; 13†	AND; 1; 6	**AND**; **2**; 10	OSC; 1 Ret	OSC; 2 DNS	SPA; 1 DNS	SPA; 2; 8	PER; 1; 14	PER; 2; 14	DON; 1; 8	DON; 2 Ret	EST; 1 Ret	EST; 2; 7	18th	1

† – Did not finish the race, but was classified as he completed over 90% of the race distance.

Sporting positions
Preceded by Danny Buxton	Renault Clio Cup; UK series champion 2002	Succeeded by Paul Rivett
