= Lee Brookes =

British racing driver (born 1968)

- Nationality: (United Kingdom) British
- Born: Lee Jon Brookes; 22 February 1968 (age 58) Walsall, Staffordshire, England

British Touring Car Championship
- Years active: 1996–1999
- Teams: Brookes Motorsport
- Starts: 63
- Wins: 0
- Poles: 0
- Fastest laps: 0
- Best finish: 17th in 1997, 1999

Championship titles
- 1996 1995: BTCC Independents Cup; Renault Clio Cup

Lee Jon Brookes (born 22 February 1968) is a British retired auto racing driver, who is still involved within motorsport, where he presently runs the Total Control Racing team. He is best known for his time racing in the British Touring Car Championship in the mid-nineties.

== Racing career ==
=== Early years ===
Brookes was born in Walsall and started racing in karting. He was the Senior British Champion in 1990. In 1993, he raced in the Renault Elf oils Clio Challenge, finishing fourth on points in his first season. After finishing third in 1994, he became champion in 1995.

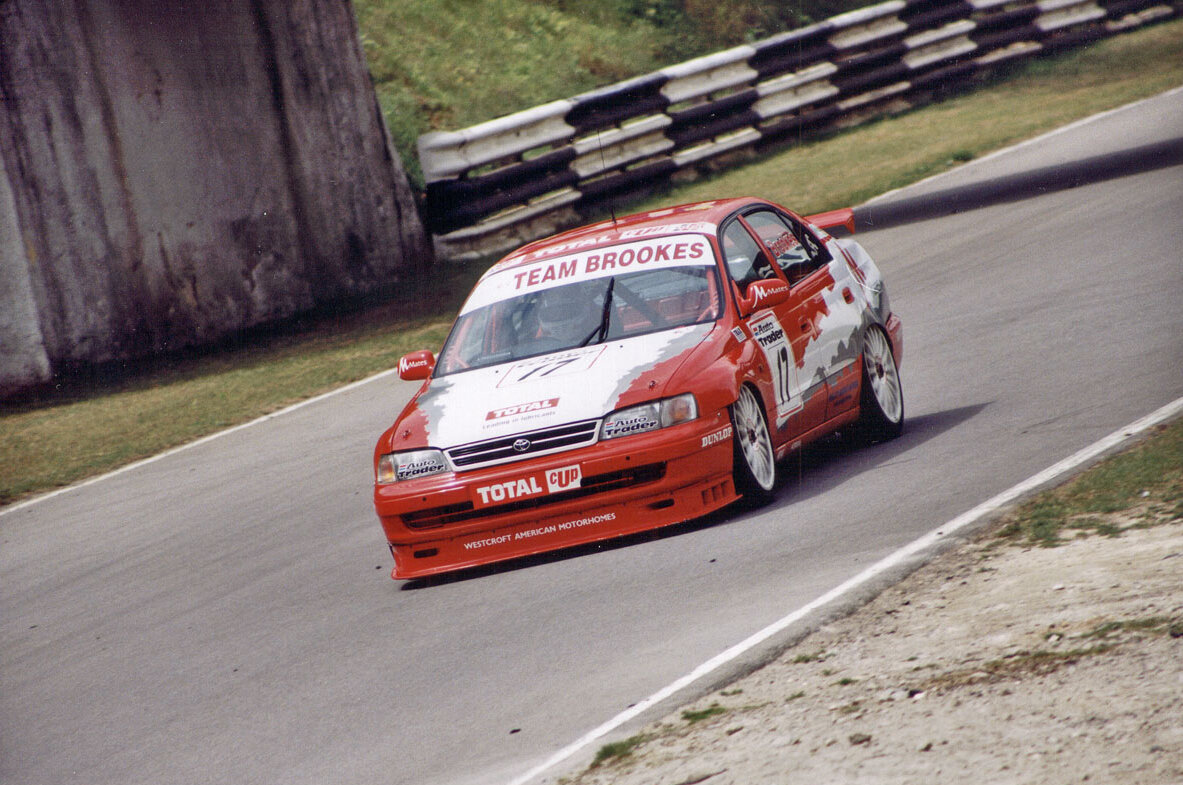
Brookes driving a Toyota Carina in the 1996 British Touring Car Championship

=== BTCC ===
In 1996, Brookes entered the prestigious British Touring Car Championship, in an ex-works Toyota Carina. He won the Total Cup For Privateers with the TOM'S Team Brookes, ran by his father Jon. Although running as an independent driver, Brookes did have limited works backing from Toyota. In 1997 he replaced the car with a Peugeot 406 that had been used by the Peugeot works team the previous year. The car suffered reliability problems that he hadn't had with the previous years car. He finished second in the independents cup, narrowly losing out to Robb Gravett. He teamed up with Gravett a year later, Brookes Motorsport entered one Honda Accord for Gravett. Brookes himself raced in just two rounds at Oulton Park. The two drivers also entered the Bathurst 1000 that year. Brookes drove the Honda Accord for a part season in 1999, finishing fourth in the independents cup. He appeared on the official entry list for the 2000 BTCC Season but did not race. (https://www.autosport.com/btcc/news/bumper-line-up-for-2000-btcc-5039306/5039306/) (https://1990sbtcc.com/seasons/2000-btcc-season/)

Brookes Motorsport reformed as TCR, which still runs on the TOCA support package, with some success.

== Racing record ==
=== Complete British Touring Car Championship results ===
(key) (Races in bold indicate pole position – 1 point awarded all races) (Races in italics indicate fastest lap) (* signifies that driver lead feature race for at least one lap – 1 point given 1998 onwards)

Year	Team	Car	1	2	3	4	5	6	7	8	9	10	11	12	13	14	15	16	17	18	19	20	21	22	23	24	25	26	Pos	Pts
1996	Tom's Team Brookes	Toyota Carina E	DON; 1; 13	DON; 2; 15	BRH; 1; 15	BRH; 2 Ret	THR; 1; 10	THR; 2; 12	SIL; 1; 18	SIL; 2; 11	OUL; 1; 14	OUL; 2; 14	SNE; 1; 12	SNE; 2; 13	BRH; 1; 13	BRH; 2; 18	SIL; 1; 14	SIL; 2; 16	KNO; 1; 13	KNO; 2; 14	OUL; 1; 12	OUL; 2; 15	THR; 1; 9	THR; 2; 16	DON; 1; 15	DON; 2; 15	BRH; 1; 14	BRH; 2; 14	19th	3
1997	Brookes Motorsport	Peugeot 406	DON; 1 Ret	DON; 2 Ret	SIL; 1; 14	SIL; 2; 11	THR; 1 Ret	THR; 2 DNS	BRH; 1; 13	BRH; 2; 15	OUL; 1; 16	OUL; 2; 9	DON; 1; 14	DON; 2; 12	CRO; 1 NC	CRO; 2; 13	KNO; 1; 17	KNO; 2; 15	SNE; 1; 13	SNE; 2 Ret	THR; 1; 10	THR; 2; 14	BRH; 1; 9	BRH; 2; 13	SIL; 1; 15	SIL; 2; 16			17th	5
1998	Brookes Motorsport	Honda Accord	THR; 1	THR; 2	SIL; 1	SIL; 2	DON; 1	DON; 2	BRH; 1	BRH; 2	OUL; 1	OUL; 2	DON; 1	DON; 2	CRO; 1	CRO; 2	SNE; 1	SNE; 2	THR; 1	THR; 2	KNO; 1	KNO; 2	BRH; 1	BRH; 2	OUL; 1 DNS	OUL; 2 DNS	SIL; 1	SIL; 2	NC	0
1999	Brookes Motorsport	Honda Accord	DON; 1; 12	DON; 2; 9	SIL; 1 Ret	SIL; 2; 10	THR; 1; 10	THR; 2; 10	BRH; 1 DNS	BRH; 2 DNS	OUL; 1	OUL; 2	DON; 1; 13	DON; 2 Ret	CRO; 1; 13	CRO; 2; 12	SNE; 1; 11	SNE; 2; 16	THR; 1; 14	THR; 2 Ret	KNO; 1	KNO; 2	BRH; 1	BRH; 2	OUL; 1	OUL; 2	SIL; 1	SIL; 2	17th	5
