= 2005 British GT Championship =

Sports car racing season

Seasons
- ← 2004 2006 →

The 2005 British GT Championship was the 13th British GT Championship, a sports car championship promoted by the SRO Motorsports Group. The season began on 2 April at Donington Park and finished on 9 October at Silverstone Circuit.

Nathan Kinch and Andrew Kirkaldy in the No.35 Scuderia Ecosse Ferrari won the GT2 drivers' and teams' championship convincingly while Dimitris Deverikos and Piers Masarati in the No. 9 Tech 9 Porsche also swept the GT3 championships.

== Calendar ==
The provisional calendar was announced on 26 October 2004. An updated calendar was released on 1 February 2005 with the Thruxton race moved from June to May to avoid a clash with the Masters of Formula 3 and 24 Hours of Le Mans Test Days.

| Round | Circuit | Length | Classes | Date |
|---|---|---|---|---|
| 1 | (United Kingdom) Donington Park, Leicestershire | 120 min | All | 2–3 April |
| 2 | (France) Circuit de Nevers Magny-Cours, Magny-Cours | 180 min | GT2 | April 30 – May 1 |
| 3 | (United Kingdom) Croft Circuit, North Yorkshire | 60 min | GT3 | 7–8 May |
| 4 | (United Kingdom) Croft Circuit, North Yorkshire | 60 min | GT3 | 7–8 May |
| 5 | (Scotland) Knockhill, Fife | 60 min | All | 21–22 May |
| 6 | (Scotland) Knockhill, Fife | 60 min | All | 21–22 May |
| 7 | (United Kingdom) Thruxton Circuit, Hampshire | 60 min | All | 28–29 May |
| 8 | (United Kingdom) Thruxton Circuit, Hampshire | 60 min | All | 28–29 May |
| 9 | (United Kingdom) Castle Combe Circuit, Wiltshire | 60 min | All | 25–26 June |
| 10 | (United Kingdom) Castle Combe Circuit, Wiltshire | 60 min | All | 25–26 June |
| 11 | (United Kingdom) Silverstone Circuit, Northamptonshire (Grand Prix Circuit) | 120 min | All | 12–14 August |
| 12 | (Republic of Ireland) Mondello Park, Caragh | 60 min | All | 17–18 September |
| 13 | (Republic of Ireland) Mondello Park, Caragh | 60 min | All | 17–18 September |
| 14 | (United Kingdom) Silverstone Circuit, Northamptonshire (International Circuit) | 60 min | All | 8–9 October |
| 15 | (United Kingdom) Silverstone Circuit, Northamptonshire (International Circuit) | 60 min | All | 8–9 October |

== Entry list ==
=== GT2 ===
| Team | Car | Engine | No. | Drivers | Rounds |
|---|---|---|---|---|---|
| (United Kingdom) Cadena GTC | Mosler MT900R | GM LS1 5.7 L V8 | 2 | (United Kingdom) Gavan Kershaw | 7–8, 11–13 |
| (United Kingdom) Cadena GTC | Mosler MT900R | GM LS1 5.7 L V8 | 2 | (United Kingdom) Barrie Whight | 7–8, 11–13 |
| (United Kingdom) Emotional Engineering | Vauxhall Monaro | GM LS1 5.7 L V8 | 4 | (Republic of Ireland) Matt Griffin | 2, 5–8, 14–15 |
| (United Kingdom) Emotional Engineering | Vauxhall Monaro | GM LS1 5.7 L V8 | 4 | (United Kingdom) Ryan Hooker | 2, 5–8, 11 |
| (United Kingdom) Emotional Engineering | Vauxhall Monaro | GM LS1 5.7 L V8 | 4 | (United Kingdom) James Brodie | 14–15 |
| (United Kingdom) Emotional Engineering | Vauxhall Monaro | GM LS1 5.7 L V8 | 4 | (United Kingdom) Adam Wiseberg | 11 |
| (United Kingdom) RJN Motorsport | Nissan 350Z | Nissan VQ35DE 3.5 L V6 | 10 | (United Kingdom) Michael Bentwood | 1–2, 7–15 |
| (United Kingdom) RJN Motorsport | Nissan 350Z | Nissan VQ35DE 3.5 L V6 | 10 | (United Kingdom) Ally McKever | 1–2, 5–8 |
| (United Kingdom) RJN Motorsport | Nissan 350Z | Nissan VQ35DE 3.5 L V6 | 10 | (United Kingdom) Anthony Reid | 11–15 |
| (United Kingdom) RJN Motorsport | Nissan 350Z | Nissan VQ35DE 3.5 L V6 | 10 | (United Kingdom) Bryce Wilson | 2, 5–6 |
| (United Kingdom) RJN Motorsport | Nissan 350Z | Nissan VQ35DE 3.5 L V6 | 10 | (United Kingdom) Alister McRae | 9–10 |
| (United Kingdom) Ian Khan | Porsche 996 GT3-R | Porsche M96/77 3.6 L Flat-6 | 18 | (United Kingdom) Ian Khan | 1–2 |
| (United Kingdom) Ian Khan | Porsche 996 GT3-R | Porsche M96/77 3.6 L Flat-6 | 18 | (United Kingdom) Tim Sugden | 1 |
| (United Kingdom) Ian Khan | Porsche 996 GT3-R | Porsche M96/77 3.6 L Flat-6 | 18 | (United Kingdom) Nigel Smith | 2 |
| (United Kingdom) Eurotech | Porsche 996 GT3-R | Porsche M96/77 3.6 L Flat-6 | 22 | (United Kingdom) David Jones | All |
| (United Kingdom) Eurotech | Porsche 996 GT3-R | Porsche M96/77 3.6 L Flat-6 | 22 | (United Kingdom) Godfrey Jones | All |
| (United Kingdom) Eurotech | Porsche 996 GT3-RSR 1, 5–15; Porsche 996 GT3-RS 2 | Porsche M96/79 3.6 L Flat-6; Porsche M96/77 3.6 L Flat-6 | 77 | (United Kingdom) Michael Caine | All |
| (United Kingdom) Eurotech | Porsche 996 GT3-RSR 1, 5–15; Porsche 996 GT3-RS 2 | Porsche M96/79 3.6 L Flat-6; Porsche M96/77 3.6 L Flat-6 | 77 | (United Kingdom) Mike Jordan | All |
| (United Kingdom) Scuderia Ecosse | Ferrari 360 GTC | Ferrari F131 3.6 L V8 | 34 | (United Kingdom) Tim Mullen | All |
| (United Kingdom) Scuderia Ecosse | Ferrari 360 GTC | Ferrari F131 3.6 L V8 | 34 | (United Kingdom) Chris Niarchos | All |
| (United Kingdom) Scuderia Ecosse | Ferrari 360 GTC | Ferrari F131 3.6 L V8 | 35 | (United Kingdom) Nathan Kinch | All |
| (United Kingdom) Scuderia Ecosse | Ferrari 360 GTC | Ferrari F131 3.6 L V8 | 35 | (United Kingdom) Andrew Kirkaldy | All |
| (United Kingdom) Team LNT | TVR T400R | TVR Speed Six 4.0 L I6 | 42 | (United Kingdom) Jonny Kane | 1–2, 5–10 |
| (United Kingdom) Team LNT | TVR T400R | TVR Speed Six 4.0 L I6 | 42 | (United Kingdom) Andrew Thompson | 5–10 |
| (United Kingdom) Team LNT | TVR T400R | TVR Speed Six 4.0 L I6 | 42 | (United Kingdom) Lawrence Tomlinson | 1–2 |
| (United Kingdom) Team LNT | TVR T400R | TVR Speed Six 4.0 L I6 | 43 | (United Kingdom) Warren Hughes | 1–2, 5–10 |
| (United Kingdom) Team LNT | TVR T400R | TVR Speed Six 4.0 L I6 | 43 | (United Kingdom) Patrick Pearce | 1–2, 5–10 |
| (United Kingdom) Master Motorsport | Ultima GTR | GM LS1 5.7 L V8 | 47 | (United Kingdom) Steven Brady | 1, 14–15 |
| (United Kingdom) Master Motorsport | Ultima GTR | GM LS1 5.7 L V8 | 47 | (United Kingdom) Calum Lockie | 1 |
| (United Kingdom) Xero Competition | Chevrolet Corvette C5 | Chevrolet LS1 5.7 L V8 | 51 | (United Kingdom) Ricky Cole | 1 |
| (United Kingdom) Xero Competition | Chevrolet Corvette C5 | Chevrolet LS1 5.7 L V8 | 51 | (United Kingdom) Ryan Hooker | 1 |
| (United Kingdom) Embassy Racing | Porsche 996 GT3-RSR | Porsche M96/79 3.6 L Flat-6 | 55 | (United Kingdom) Ben Collins | All |
| (United Kingdom) Embassy Racing | Porsche 996 GT3-RSR | Porsche M96/79 3.6 L Flat-6 | 55 | (New Zealand) Neil Cunningham | All |
| (United Kingdom) Eclipse Motorsport | Mosler MT900R | GM LS1 5.7 L V8 | 69 | (United Kingdom) Steve Hyde | 7–11, 14–15 |
| (United Kingdom) Eclipse Motorsport | Mosler MT900R | GM LS1 5.7 L V8 | 69 | (United Kingdom) Phil Keen | 7–11, 14–15 |
| (United Kingdom) Graham Nash Motorsport | Porsche 996 GT3-RS | Porsche M96/77 3.6 L Flat-6 | 78 | (United Kingdom) Alan Bonner | 11 |
| (United Kingdom) Graham Nash Motorsport | Porsche 996 GT3-RS | Porsche M96/77 3.6 L Flat-6 | 78 | (Australia) Stephen Borness | 11 |

=== GT3 ===
| Team | Car | Engine | No. | Drivers | Rounds |
|---|---|---|---|---|---|
| (United Kingdom) Bigfish Racing | BMW Z3M Coupe | BMW S50 3.2 L I6 | 6 | (United Kingdom) Alistair Davidson | 1, 3–4, 11 |
| (United Kingdom) Bigfish Racing | BMW Z3M Coupe | BMW S50 3.2 L I6 | 6 | (United Kingdom) Chris Wilson | 1, 3–4, 11 |
| (United Kingdom) Hawthorns Motorsport | BMW Z3M Coupe | BMW S50 3.2 L I6 | 8 | (United Kingdom) Rod Barrett | 1, 3–4, 7–8 |
| (United Kingdom) Hawthorns Motorsport | BMW Z3M Coupe | BMW S50 3.2 L I6 | 8 | (Sweden) Jan Persson | 1, 3–4, 7–8 |
| (United Kingdom) Tech 9 | Porsche 996 GT3 Cup | Porsche M96/77 3.6 L Flat-6 | 9 | (Greece) Dimitris Deverikos | 1, 3–13 |
| (United Kingdom) Tech 9 | Porsche 996 GT3 Cup | Porsche M96/77 3.6 L Flat-6 | 9 | (United Kingdom) Piers Masarati | 1, 3–13 |
| (United Kingdom) Tech 9 | Porsche 996 GT3 Cup | Porsche M96/77 3.6 L Flat-6 | 9 | (United Kingdom) Ian McKellar | 14–15 |
| (United Kingdom) Tech 9 | Porsche 996 GT3 Cup | Porsche M96/77 3.6 L Flat-6 | 9 | (Republic of Ireland) James Murphy | 14–15 |
| (United Kingdom) Team Aero | Morgan Aero 8 GT | BMW M62TUB44 4.4 L V8 | 11 | (United Kingdom) Oliver Bryant | All |
| (United Kingdom) Team Aero | Morgan Aero 8 GT | BMW M62TUB44 4.4 L V8 | 11 | (United Kingdom) Keith Ahlers | 1, 5–15 |
| (United Kingdom) Vision Marketing | Ferrari 360 Challenge | Ferrari F131 3.6 L V8 | 12 | (United Kingdom) Phil Burton | 1, 3–10 |
| (United Kingdom) Vision Marketing | Ferrari 360 Challenge | Ferrari F131 3.6 L V8 | 12 | (United Kingdom) Ian Flux | 1, 3–6, 9–10 |
| (United Kingdom) Vision Marketing | Ferrari 360 Challenge | Ferrari F131 3.6 L V8 | 12 | (United Kingdom) Adam Wilcox | 7–8 |
| (United Kingdom) JMH | Ferrari 360 Challenge | Ferrari F131 3.6 L V8 | 12 | (United Kingdom) Phil Burton | 11–15 |
| (United Kingdom) JMH | Ferrari 360 Challenge | Ferrari F131 3.6 L V8 | 12 | (United Kingdom) Adam Wilcox | 11–15 |
| (United Kingdom) R&D Automotive/Innovate | Porsche 996 GT3 Cup | Porsche M96/77 3.6 L Flat-6 | 14 | (United Kingdom) Richard Jones | 3–4, 7–10 |
| (United Kingdom) R&D Automotive/Innovate | Porsche 996 GT3 Cup | Porsche M96/77 3.6 L Flat-6 | 14 | (United Kingdom) Pete Osborne | 3–4, 7–10 |
| (United Kingdom) Damax | Ferrari 360 Modena | Ferrari F131 3.6 L V8 | 15 | (United Kingdom) Nick Adams | All |
| (United Kingdom) Damax | Ferrari 360 Modena | Ferrari F131 3.6 L V8 | 15 | (United Kingdom) Marco Attard | All |
| (United Kingdom) Damax | Ferrari 360 Modena | Ferrari F131 3.6 L V8 | 16 | (United Kingdom) Jamie Smyth | All |
| (United Kingdom) Damax | Ferrari 360 Modena | Ferrari F131 3.6 L V8 | 16 | (United Kingdom) Miles Hulford | 1, 3–13 |
| (United Kingdom) Damax | Ferrari 360 Modena | Ferrari F131 3.6 L V8 | 16 | (United Kingdom) Aaron Scott | 14–15 |
| (United Kingdom) RPM | Porsche 996 GT3 Cup | Porsche M96/77 3.6 L Flat-6 | 19 | (United Kingdom) Tim Harvey | 14–15 |
| (United Kingdom) RPM | Porsche 996 GT3 Cup | Porsche M96/77 3.6 L Flat-6 | 19 | (United Kingdom) Alex Mortimer | 14–15 |
| (United Kingdom) Trackspeed | Porsche 996 GT3 Cup | Porsche M96/77 3.6 L Flat-6 | 20 | (United Kingdom) David Ashburn | All |
| (United Kingdom) Trackspeed | Porsche 996 GT3 Cup | Porsche M96/77 3.6 L Flat-6 | 20 | (United Kingdom) Fred Moss | 3–15 |
| (United Kingdom) Trackspeed | Porsche 996 GT3 Cup | Porsche M96/77 3.6 L Flat-6 | 20 | (United Kingdom) Rory Fordyce | 1 |
| (United Kingdom) Trackspeed | Porsche 996 GT3 Cup | Porsche M96/77 3.6 L Flat-6 | 25 | (United Kingdom) Rory Fordyce | 7–11, 14–15 |
| (United Kingdom) Trackspeed | Porsche 996 GT3 Cup | Porsche M96/77 3.6 L Flat-6 | 25 | (United Kingdom) Jason Coffin | 7–11 |
| (United Kingdom) Trackspeed | Porsche 996 GT3 Cup | Porsche M96/77 3.6 L Flat-6 | 25 | (United Kingdom) Piers Masarati | 14–15 |
| (United Kingdom) United Christian Broadcasters | Ferrari 360 | Ferrari F131 3.6 L V8 | 21 | (Republic of Ireland) Hector Lester | 1, 3–6, 9–15 |
| (United Kingdom) United Christian Broadcasters | Ferrari 360 | Ferrari F131 3.6 L V8 | 21 | (Denmark) Allan Simonsen | 1, 3–6, 9–13 |
| (United Kingdom) United Christian Broadcasters | Ferrari 360 | Ferrari F131 3.6 L V8 | 21 | (Republic of Ireland) Shane Lynch | 14–15 |
| (United Kingdom) Motorbase Performance | Porsche 996 GT3 Cup | Porsche M96/77 3.6 L Flat-6 | 23 | (United Kingdom) Andy Britnell | 5–15 |
| (United Kingdom) Motorbase Performance | Porsche 996 GT3 Cup | Porsche M96/77 3.6 L Flat-6 | 23 | (United Kingdom) Christopher Stockton | 5–6, 9–13 |
| (United Kingdom) Motorbase Performance | Porsche 996 GT3 Cup | Porsche M96/77 3.6 L Flat-6 | 23 | (United Kingdom) Tim Harvey | 7–8 |
| (United Kingdom) Motorbase Performance | Porsche 996 GT3 Cup | Porsche M96/77 3.6 L Flat-6 | 23 | (Republic of Ireland) Damien Faulkner | 14–15 |
| (United Kingdom) Motorbase Performance | Porsche 996 GT3 Cup | Porsche M96/77 3.6 L Flat-6 | 33 | (United Kingdom) Sam Edwards | 7–8 |
| (United Kingdom) Motorbase Performance | Porsche 996 GT3 Cup | Porsche M96/77 3.6 L Flat-6 | 33 | (United Kingdom) Richard Stanton | 7–8 |
| (United Kingdom) Motorbase Quaife | Porsche 996 GT3 Cup | Porsche M96/77 3.6 L Flat-6 | 32 | (United Kingdom) Gary Britnell | 14–15 |
| (United Kingdom) Motorbase Quaife | Porsche 996 GT3 Cup | Porsche M96/77 3.6 L Flat-6 | 32 | (United Kingdom) Richard Hay | 14–15 |
| (United Kingdom) Motorbase Quaife | Porsche 996 GT3 Cup | Porsche M96/77 3.6 L Flat-6 | 96 | (United Kingdom) Phil Quaife | 1, 3–11, 14–15 |
| (United Kingdom) Motorbase Quaife | Porsche 996 GT3 Cup | Porsche M96/77 3.6 L Flat-6 | 96 | (United Kingdom) Stuart Moseley | 9–11, 14–15 |
| (United Kingdom) Motorbase Quaife | Porsche 996 GT3 Cup | Porsche M96/77 3.6 L Flat-6 | 96 | (United Kingdom) Alex Mortimer | 1, 3–6 |
| (United Kingdom) Motorbase Quaife | Porsche 996 GT3 Cup | Porsche M96/77 3.6 L Flat-6 | 96 | (United Kingdom) David Pinkney | 7–8 |
| (United Kingdom) ABG Motorsport | Porsche 996 GT3 Cup | Porsche M96/77 3.6 L Flat-6 | 24 | (United Kingdom) Colin Broster | 12–15 |
| (United Kingdom) ABG Motorsport | Porsche 996 GT3 Cup | Porsche M96/77 3.6 L Flat-6 | 24 | (United Kingdom) Paul Mace | 12–15 |
| (United Kingdom) Rob Horsfield Racing | Prosport 3000 | Cosworth FBA 3.0 L V6 | 26 | (United Kingdom) Rob Horsfield | 7–8, 11 |
| (United Kingdom) Rob Horsfield Racing | Prosport 3000 | Cosworth FBA 3.0 L V6 | 26 | (United Kingdom) Ian Stinton | 7–8, 11 |
| (United Kingdom) Graeme Mundy | Porsche 996 GT3 Cup | Porsche M96/77 3.6 L Flat-6 | 28 | (United Kingdom) Graeme Mundy | 11 |
| (United Kingdom) Graeme Mundy | Porsche 996 GT3 Cup | Porsche M96/77 3.6 L Flat-6 | 28 | (United Kingdom) Richard Stanton | 11 |
| (United Kingdom) Team Parker Racing | Porsche 996 GT3 Cup | Porsche M96/77 3.6 L Flat-6 | 30 | (United Kingdom) Martin Rich | 1, 3–10, 14–15 |
| (United Kingdom) Team Parker Racing | Porsche 996 GT3 Cup | Porsche M96/77 3.6 L Flat-6 | 30 | (United Kingdom) Julian Westwood | 1, 3–10, 14–15 |
| (United Kingdom) Team Parker Racing | Porsche 996 GT3 Cup | Porsche M96/77 3.6 L Flat-6 | 31 | (United Kingdom) Gary Eastwood | 3–4, 7–8, 14–15 |
| (United Kingdom) Team Parker Racing | Porsche 996 GT3 Cup | Porsche M96/77 3.6 L Flat-6 | 31 | (United Kingdom) Brendon Deschamp | 3–4 |
| (United Kingdom) Team Parker Racing | Porsche 996 GT3 Cup | Porsche M96/77 3.6 L Flat-6 | 31 | (United Kingdom) Mark Cole | 7–8 |
| (United Kingdom) Team Parker Racing | Porsche 996 GT3 Cup | Porsche M96/77 3.6 L Flat-6 | 31 | (United Kingdom) Ryan Hooker | 14–15 |
| (United Kingdom) Team Parker Racing | Porsche 996 GT3 Cup | Porsche M96/77 3.6 L Flat-6 | 31 | (United Kingdom) Andy Britnell | 1 |
| (United Kingdom) Team Parker Racing | Porsche 996 GT3 Cup | Porsche M96/77 3.6 L Flat-6 | 31 | (United Kingdom) Christopher Stockton | 1 |
| (United Kingdom) Team Parker Racing | Porsche 996 GT3 Cup | Porsche M96/77 3.6 L Flat-6 | 31 | (United Kingdom) Sam Edwards | 11 |
| (United Kingdom) Bill Barrett Motorsport | Porsche 996 GT3 Cup | Porsche M96/77 3.6 L Flat-6 | 36 | (United Kingdom) Stephen Warburton | 1, 3–10, 14–15 |
| (United Kingdom) Bill Barrett Motorsport | Porsche 996 GT3 Cup | Porsche M96/77 3.6 L Flat-6 | 36 | (United Kingdom) Peter Morris | 1, 3–8 |
| (United Kingdom) Bill Barrett Motorsport | Porsche 996 GT3 Cup | Porsche M96/77 3.6 L Flat-6 | 36 | (United Kingdom) Stuart Prior | 9–10 |
| (United Kingdom) Bill Barrett Motorsport | Porsche 996 GT3 Cup | Porsche M96/77 3.6 L Flat-6 | 36 | (United Kingdom) Sean Edwards | 11, 14–15 |
| (United Kingdom) Bill Barrett Motorsport | Porsche 996 GT3 Cup | Porsche M96/77 3.6 L Flat-6 | 36 | (United Kingdom) James Brodie | 11 |
| (United Kingdom) Chad Racing | Porsche 996 GT3 Cup | Porsche M96/77 3.6 L Flat-6 | 37 | (United Kingdom) Andy Allen | 11 |
| (United Kingdom) Chad Racing | Porsche 996 GT3 Cup | Porsche M96/77 3.6 L Flat-6 | 37 | (Republic of Ireland) Pete James | 11 |
| (United Kingdom) Chad Racing | Porsche 996 GT3 Cup | Porsche M96/77 3.6 L Flat-6 | 38 | (United Kingdom) Iain Dockerill | 11 |
| (United Kingdom) Chad Racing | Porsche 996 GT3 Cup | Porsche M96/77 3.6 L Flat-6 | 38 | (United Kingdom) Nigel Greensall | 11 |
| (United Kingdom) Trident | Trident Iceni R | GM Duramax 6.6 L Turbo V8 (Diesel) | 40 | (United Kingdom) Alan Bonner | 14–15 |
| (United Kingdom) Trident | Trident Iceni R | GM Duramax 6.6 L Turbo V8 (Diesel) | 40 | (United Kingdom) Enzo Mucci | 14–15 |
| (United Kingdom) Virgo Motorsport | Ferrari 360 | Ferrari F131 3.6 L V8 | 44 | (United Kingdom) Daniel Eagling | 11 |
| (United Kingdom) Virgo Motorsport | Ferrari 360 | Ferrari F131 3.6 L V8 | 44 | (United Kingdom) Jim McWhirter | 11 |
| (Denmark) Bo McCormick | Ferrari 360 Modena Challenge | Ferrari F131 3.6 L V8 | 44 | (United Kingdom) Calum Lockie | 11 |
| (Denmark) Bo McCormick | Ferrari 360 Modena Challenge | Ferrari F131 3.6 L V8 | 44 | (Denmark) Bo McCormick | 11 |
| (United Kingdom) David Dove Racing Team | Ferrari 360 | Ferrari F131 3.6 L V8 | 70 | (United Kingdom) Jim Bickley | 3–4 |
| (United Kingdom) David Dove Racing Team | Ferrari 360 | Ferrari F131 3.6 L V8 | 70 | (United Kingdom) David Dove | 3–4 |
| (United Kingdom) Team Tiger | Marcos Mantis | Chevrolet LS7 7.0 L V8 | 81 | (United Kingdom) Chris Beighton | 1, 3–13 |
| (United Kingdom) Team Tiger | Marcos Mantis | Chevrolet LS7 7.0 L V8 | 81 | (United Kingdom) Jon Finnemore | 1, 3–13 |
| (United Kingdom) Eurotech | Porsche 996 GT3-RSR | Porsche M96/79 3.6 L Flat-6 | 99 | (United Kingdom) Steve Wood | 1, 3–11 |
| (United Kingdom) Eurotech | Porsche 996 GT3-RSR | Porsche M96/79 3.6 L Flat-6 | 99 | (United Kingdom) Stuart Scott | 1, 3–6, 11 |
| (United Kingdom) Eurotech | Porsche 996 GT3-RSR | Porsche M96/79 3.6 L Flat-6 | 99 | (United Kingdom) Nick Adcock | 7–8 |
| (United Kingdom) Eurotech | Porsche 996 GT3-RSR | Porsche M96/79 3.6 L Flat-6 | 99 | (United Kingdom) Mark Sumpter | 9–10 |

== Race results ==
| Round | Circuit | GT2 winners | GT3 winners |
|---|---|---|---|
| 1 | Donington | (United Kingdom) No. 35 Scuderia Ecosse | (United Kingdom) No. 9 Tech 9 |
| 1 | Donington | (United Kingdom) Nathan Kinch (United Kingdom) Andrew Kirkaldy | (Greece) Dimitris Deverikos (United Kingdom) Piers Masarati |
| 2 | Magny-Cours | (United Kingdom) No. 83 Scuderia Ecosse | did not participate |
| 2 | Magny-Cours | (United Kingdom) Nathan Kinch (United Kingdom) Andrew Kirkaldy | did not participate |
| 3 | Croft | did not participate | (United Kingdom) No. 9 Tech 9 |
| 3 | Croft | did not participate | (Greece) Dimitris Deverikos (United Kingdom) Piers Masarati |
| 4 | Croft | did not participate | (United Kingdom) No. 23 Motorbase Performance |
| 4 | Croft | did not participate | (United Kingdom) Andy Britnell (United Kingdom) Christopher Stockton |
| 5 | Knockhill | (United Kingdom) No. 55 Embassy Racing | (United Kingdom) No. 9 Tech 9 |
| 5 | Knockhill | (United Kingdom) Ben Collins (New Zealand) Neil Cunningham | (Greece) Dimitris Deverikos (United Kingdom) Piers Masarati |
| 6 | Knockhill | (United Kingdom) No. 35 Scuderia Ecosse | (United Kingdom) No. 9 Tech 9 |
| 6 | Knockhill | (United Kingdom) Nathan Kinch (United Kingdom) Andrew Kirkaldy | (Greece) Dimitris Deverikos (United Kingdom) Piers Masarati |
| 7 | Thruxton | (United Kingdom) No. 35 Scuderia Ecosse | (United Kingdom) No. 11 Team Aero |
| 7 | Thruxton | (United Kingdom) Nathan Kinch (United Kingdom) Andrew Kirkaldy | (United Kingdom) Keith Ahlers (United Kingdom) Oliver Bryant |
| 8 | Thruxton | (United Kingdom) No. 35 Scuderia Ecosse | (United Kingdom) No. 81 Team Tiger |
| 8 | Thruxton | (United Kingdom) Nathan Kinch (United Kingdom) Andrew Kirkaldy | (United Kingdom) Chris Beighton (United Kingdom) Jon Finnemore |
| 9 | Castle Combe | (United Kingdom) No. 35 Scuderia Ecosse | (United Kingdom) No. 21 United Christian Broadcasters |
| 9 | Castle Combe | (United Kingdom) Nathan Kinch (United Kingdom) Andrew Kirkaldy | (Republic of Ireland) Hector Lester (Denmark) Allan Simonsen |
| 10 | Castle Combe | (United Kingdom) No. 35 Scuderia Ecosse | (United Kingdom) No. 81 Team Tiger |
| 10 | Castle Combe | (United Kingdom) Nathan Kinch (United Kingdom) Andrew Kirkaldy | (United Kingdom) Chris Beighton (United Kingdom) Jon Finnemore |
| 11 | Silverstone (Grand Prix Circuit) | (United Kingdom) No. 55 Embassy Racing | (United Kingdom) No. 23 Motorbase Performance |
| 11 | Silverstone (Grand Prix Circuit) | (United Kingdom) Ben Collins (New Zealand) Neil Cunningham | (United Kingdom) Andy Britnell (United Kingdom) Christopher Stockton |
| 12 | Mondello | (United Kingdom) No. 35 Scuderia Ecosse | (United Kingdom) No. 9 Tech 9 |
| 12 | Mondello | (United Kingdom) Nathan Kinch (United Kingdom) Andrew Kirkaldy | (Greece) Dimitris Deverikos (United Kingdom) Piers Masarati |
| 13 | Mondello | (United Kingdom) No. 35 Scuderia Ecosse | (United Kingdom) No. 11 Team Aero |
| 13 | Mondello | (United Kingdom) Nathan Kinch (United Kingdom) Andrew Kirkaldy | (United Kingdom) Keith Ahlers (United Kingdom) Oliver Bryant |
| 14 | Silverstone (International Circuit) | (United Kingdom) No. 35 Scuderia Ecosse | (United Kingdom) No. 9 Tech 9 |
| 14 | Silverstone (International Circuit) | (United Kingdom) Nathan Kinch (United Kingdom) Andrew Kirkaldy | (Greece) Dimitris Deverikos (United Kingdom) Piers Masarati |
| 15 | Silverstone (International Circuit) | (United Kingdom) No. 35 Scuderia Ecosse | (United Kingdom) No. 96 Motorbase Quaife |
| 15 | Silverstone (International Circuit) | (United Kingdom) Nathan Kinch (United Kingdom) Andrew Kirkaldy | (United Kingdom) Stuart Moseley (United Kingdom) Phil Quaife |
