= Mark Jones (racing driver) =

British racing driver (born 1980)

- Nationality: (United Kingdom) British

Previous series
- 2006: British Touring Car Championship

Mark Jones (born 16 March 1980) is a British racing driver.

== Early and personal life ==
Jones grew up in Port Erin, Isle of Man. He now lives in Goostrey, Cheshire.

== Career ==
=== British Touring Car Championship ===
Jones drove in the final six rounds of the 2006 British Touring Car Championship for Xero Competition / Team Forward Racing in a Lexus IS200 alongside team mate Adam Jones, who had raced for most of the year. The car was an uncompetitive one, and his best finish was a sixteenth at Brands Hatch.

== Racing record ==
=== Complete British Touring Car Championship results ===
(key) (Races in bold indicate pole position - 1 point awarded in first race) (Races in italics indicate fastest lap - 1 point awarded all races) (* signifies that driver lead race for at least one lap - 1 point awarded all races)

Year	Team	Car	1	2	3	4	5	6	7	8	9	10	11	12	13	14	15	16	17	18	19	20	21	22	23	24	25	26	27	28	29	30	DC	Pts
2006	Team Forward Racing	Lexus IS200	BRH; 1	BRH; 2	BRH; 3	MON; 1	MON; 2	MON; 3	OUL; 1	OUL; 2	OUL; 3	THR; 1	THR; 2	THR; 3	CRO; 1	CRO; 2	CRO; 3	DON; 1	DON; 2	DON; 3	SNE; 1	SNE; 2	SNE; 3	KNO; 1	KNO; 2	KNO; 3	BRH; 1; 18	BRH; 2 Ret	BRH; 3; 16	SIL; 1 Ret	SIL; 2 NC	SIL; 3 Ret	**29th**	**0**
