= 2006 British Touring Car Championship =

49th season of the British Touring Car Championship

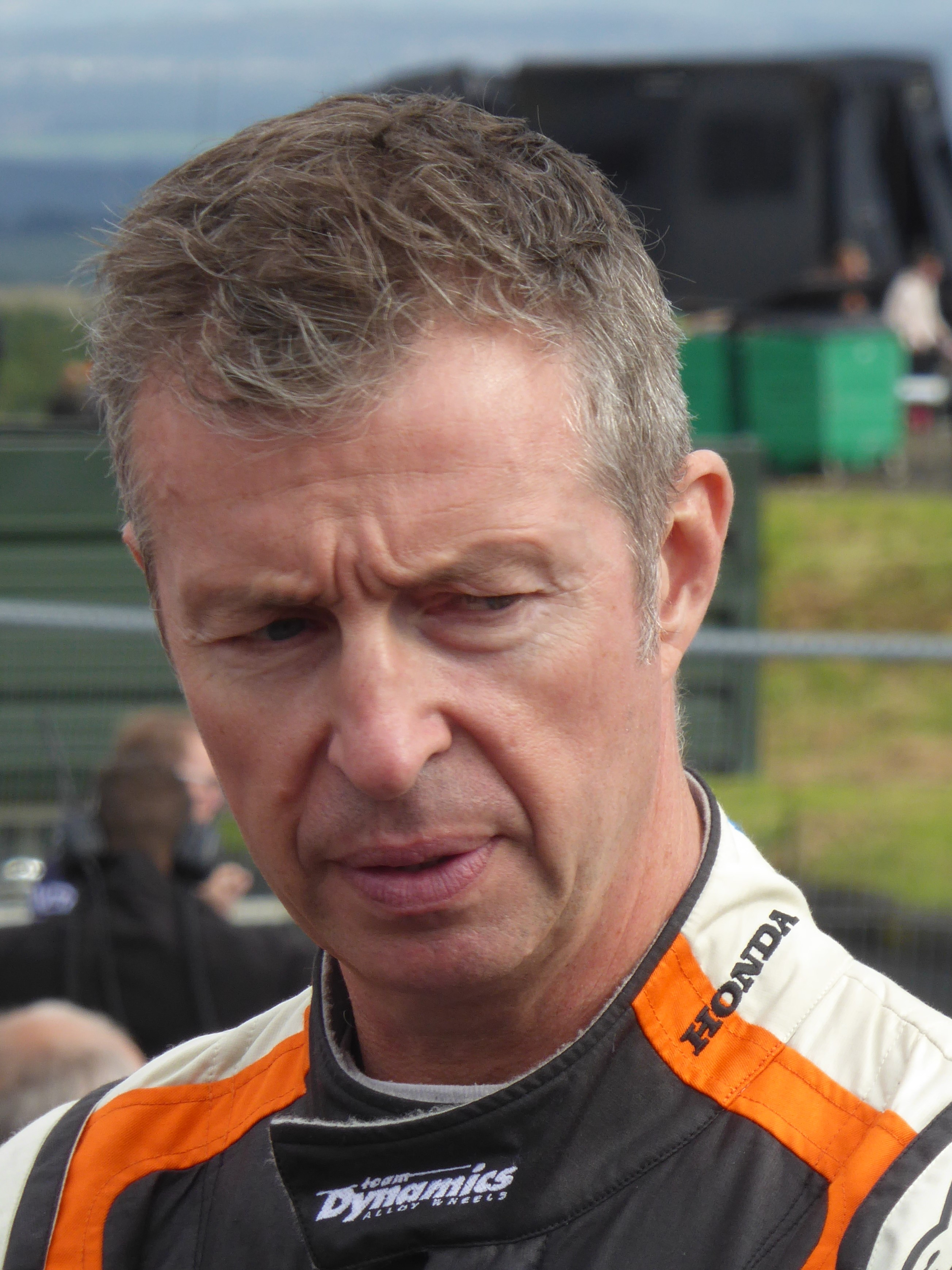
Matt Neal defended his title winning the 2006 Drivers' Championship.

The 2006 Dunlop MSA British Touring Car Championship season was the 49th British Touring Car Championship (BTCC) season. As in 2005, there were ten racing weekends at nine different circuits; each round comprising three races, making a thirty round competition in total.

== Changes for 2006 ==
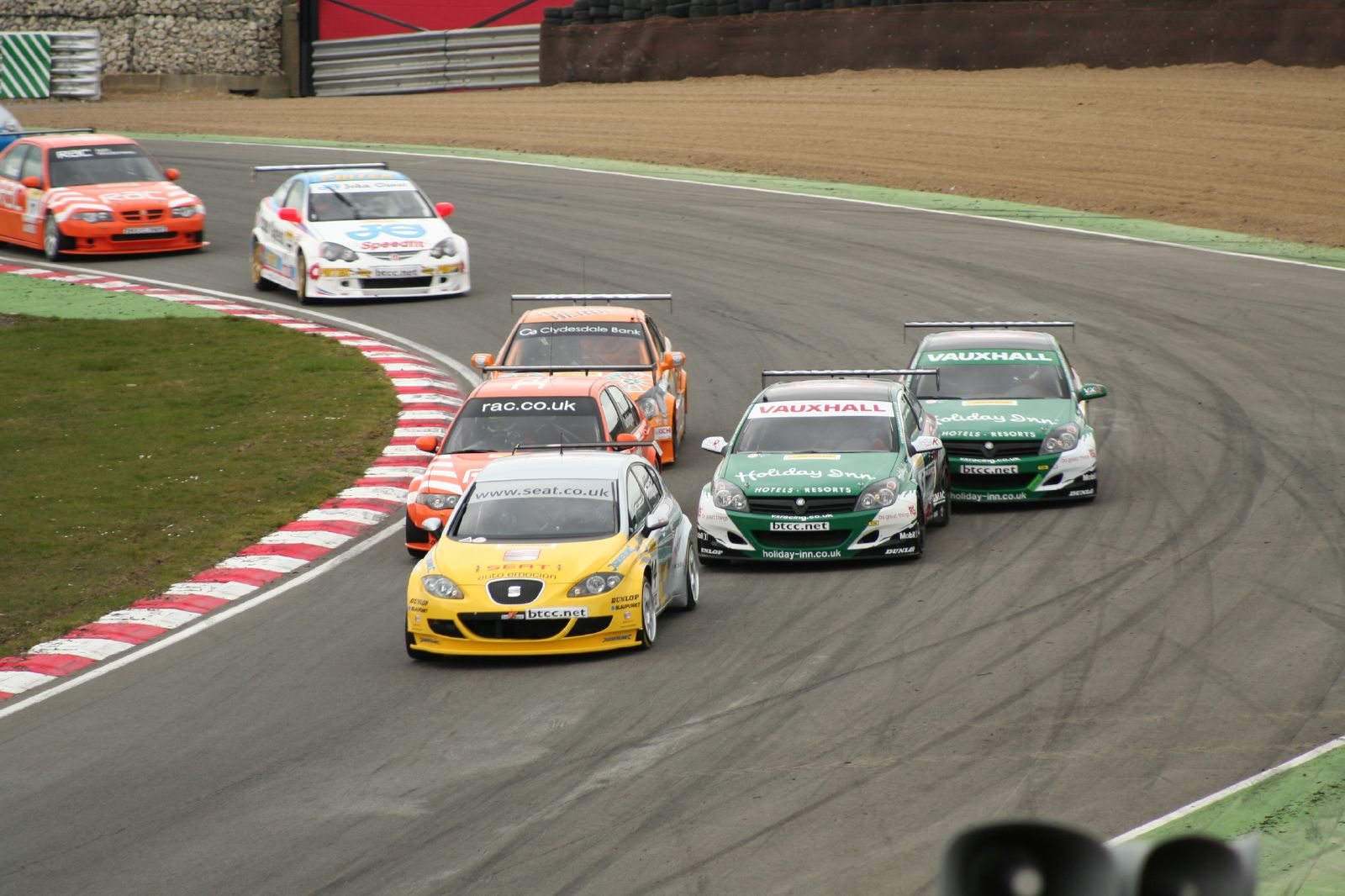
2006 BTCC Race at Brands Hatch.

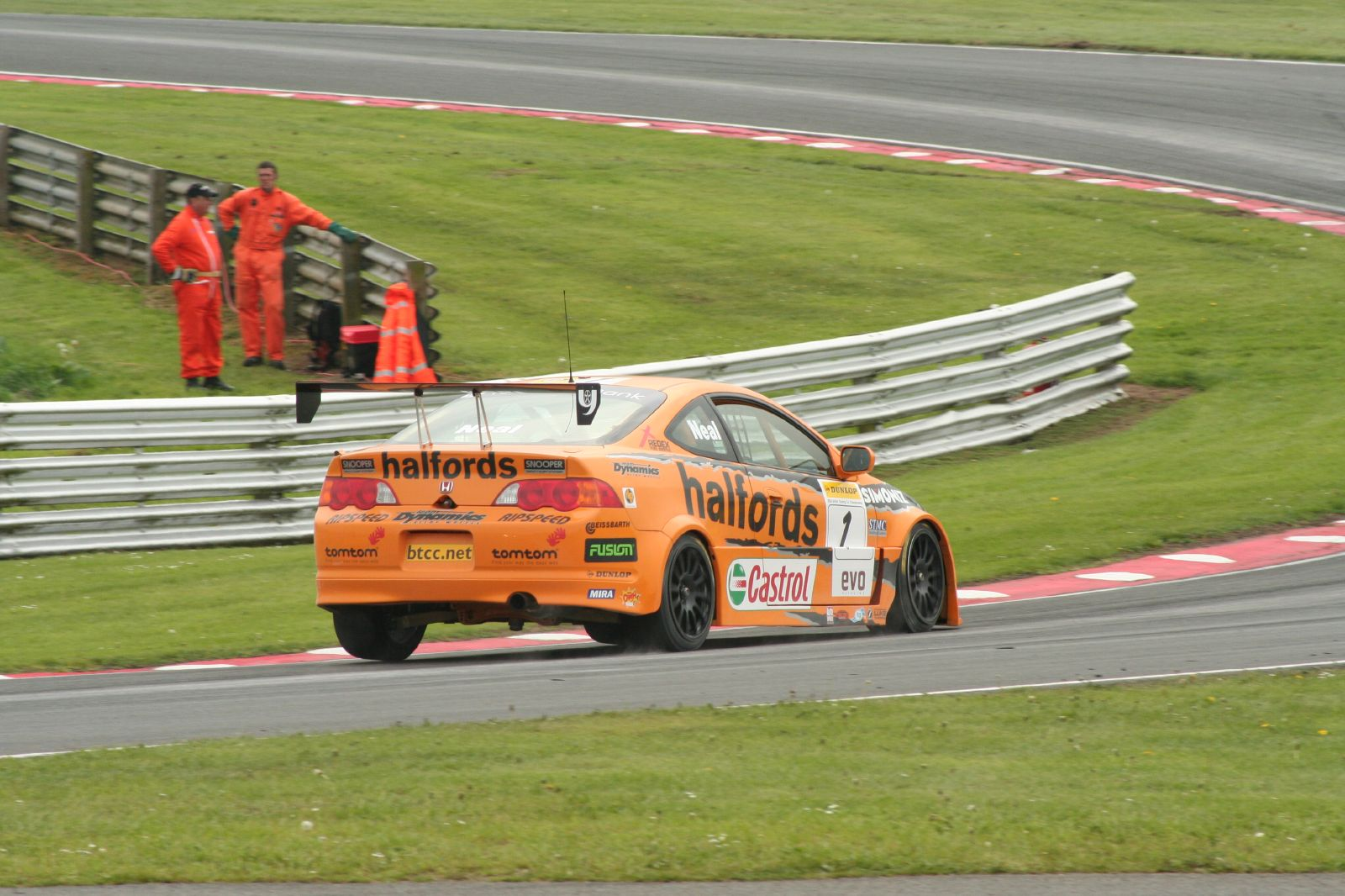
The drivers' championship was won by Matt Neal.

=== Teams and drivers ===
The Triple 8-run works Vauxhall effort continued with a trio of entries in their second season with the Astra Sport Hatch. Yvan Muller left the team after six seasons to contest the World Touring Car Championship for SEAT, and was replaced by Italian veteran Fabrizio Giovanardi, a multiple champion in several European series but contesting his first season in British touring cars. Tom Chilton replaced Colin Turkington in the second car after three seasons with the Arena Motorsport-run Honda programme, while Gavin Smith spent a second season in the third car. Turkish touring car champion Erkut Kizilirmak also appeared at two rounds in a fourth entry.

Vauxhall's only opposition for a sixth straight Manufacturers title came from SEAT, who replaced its trio of Toledos with a pair of new Leons. Jason Plato again headed their assault, while the second seat was alternated throughout the year between the returning James Thompson (also racing for SEAT in the WTCC) and sportscar star Darren Turner. Both drivers ran at the final meeting with Thompson using his WTCC car.

Reigning Teams and Independents champions Team Dynamics ran their pair of self-developed Honda Integra Type Rs for a second year, with champion Matt Neal remaining with his family team. Scottish driver Gordon Shedden graduated from the SEAT Cupra championship to replace Dan Eaves, while Gareth Howell again appeared in a third car later in the season as he had in 2005.

In its third year as an independent, West Surrey Racing continued to run its ex-works MG ZSs, in spite of (MG Rover in fact having gone out of business during 2005. Colin Turkington returned to the team after a disappointing year at Vauxhall, partnering Rob Collard, who had been the team's sole driver in 2005. A 3rd WSR entry appeared on the official entry list but never materialised.

Among the most competitive newcomers to the series were two teams making the transition from GT racing with Team Dynamics' 2005 title-winning Integras. Team Eurotech ran team boss Mike Jordan, the most experienced driver on the grid, back in the BTCC after well over a decade away in sportscar and GT racing. Motorbase Performance ran David Pinkney, another returning veteran, who was making his first BTCC appearance since 2001. Tom Ferrier also returned to the series with Motorbase in the final round, driving an ex-works SEAT Toledo.

Synchro Motorsport ran James Kaye in their Honda Civic Type-R for a fourth straight season, while Jason Hughes also returned driving an ex-works MG ZS for his Kartworld Racing team. Both Kartworld and the WSR team switched their MGs to bio-ethanol fuel later in the year. Running bio-ethanol fuel for a second year were Tech-Speed Motorsport, who once again ran Fiona Leggate in their Vauxhall Astra Coupe. Leggate was replaced by ex-Vauxhall works driver Paul O'Neill for the final two rounds.

Mark Proctor switched from his Astra Coupe for his second season, his Fast-Tec Motorsport team instead running the Honda Civic Type-R driven by Tom Chilton in 2005. BMW and Alfa Romeo were represented on the BTCC grid for the first time since 2004, with club racers Martin Bell (Geoff Steel Racing) and Mark Smith (In-Front Motorsport) making their debuts in ex-WTCC BMW 320i's and Alfa Romeo 156s respectively.

The championship welcomed several more entries across the course of the season. Xero Competition entered a Lexus IS200 (converted to Super 2000 rules from the Dutch touring car series) for British GT racer Adam Jones, Quest Racing ran young Irishman Eoin Murray in the ex-works Alfa Romeo 156 he won for taking the Alfa Romeo 147 Challenge title in 2005, while Richard Marsh returned to the field racing an ex-Vic Lee Racing Peugeot 307 for Team Griffin Racing. This car was converted to run on bioethanol fuel for the final meeting at Silverstone.

The final two rounds saw another raft of new entries, all of which were planning full campaigns in 2007. The pair of Lexus IS200s run by SpeedEquipe in 2005 were entered by BTC Racing for Chris Stockton and Darren Dowling, while a third Lexus was fielded by Team Forward Racing (a satellite squad of Xero Competition) for Mark Jones. Daniels Motorsport made a second late-season appearance with their Astra Coupe, with Nick Leason at the wheel.

=== Other changes ===
Following a meeting between BTCC teams and series organiser TOCA, a number of changes to the technical and sporting regulations were introduced for 2006:

- The number of grid places reversed for race three's starting grid varied between six and ten. The actual number was unknown at each race meeting until it was randomly drawn by the winner of race two, immediately after that race. This replaced the previous season's rule of reversing the top ten finishers, which had seen drivers deliberately trying to drop to tenth place in race two in order to secure pole for race three.
- The base weight of BTC-spec cars was raised to 1175 kg, although the difference in base weight between BTC and S2000-spec cars remained the same as at the end of 2005.
- Cars of drivers who entered the BTCC late, or dipped in and out of the championship, were penalised with a maximum success ballast at their first meeting or on their return. The ballast amount was subsequently reduced at the second and third meetings in which that car competed.

== Teams and drivers ==
| Team | Car | No. | Drivers | Rounds |
Works BTC-T Entries
| VX Racing | Vauxhall Astra Sport Hatch | 5 | (United Kingdom) Tom Chilton | All |
| VX Racing | Vauxhall Astra Sport Hatch | 10 | (Republic of Ireland) Gavin Smith | All |
| VX Racing | Vauxhall Astra Sport Hatch | 11 | (Italy) Fabrizio Giovanardi | All |
| VX Racing | Vauxhall Astra Sport Hatch | 90 | (Turkey) Erkut Kızılırmak | 5, 7 |
Works S2000 Entries
| SEAT Sport UK | SEAT León | 4 | (United Kingdom) Jason Plato | All |
| SEAT Sport UK | SEAT León | 14 | (United Kingdom) James Thompson | 1–3, 5, 7, 10 |
| SEAT Sport UK | SEAT León | 24 | (United Kingdom) Darren Turner | 4, 6, 8–10 |
Independent BTC-T Entries
| Team Halfords | Honda Integra Type-R | 1 | (United Kingdom) Matt Neal | All |
| Team Halfords | Honda Integra Type-R | 25 | (United Kingdom) Gareth Howell | 7–10 |
| Team Halfords | Honda Integra Type-R | 52 | (United Kingdom) Gordon Shedden | All |
| Team RAC | MG ZS | 6 | (United Kingdom) Colin Turkington | All |
| Team RAC | MG ZS | 7 | (United Kingdom) Rob Collard | All |
| Fast-Tec Motorsport | Honda Civic Type-R | 12 | (United Kingdom) Mark Proctor | 1–3, 5, 7–8 |
| Team Farécla | Peugeot 307 | 16 | (United Kingdom) Richard Marsh | 6–10 |
| NJL Racing with Daniels Motorsport | Vauxhall Astra Coupé | 19 | (United Kingdom) Nick Leason | 9–10 |
| Synchro Motorsport | Honda Civic Type-R | 20 | (United Kingdom) James Kaye | All |
| Kartworld Racing | MG ZS | 28 | (United Kingdom) Jason Hughes | All |
| Motorbase Performance | Honda Integra Type-R | 55 | (United Kingdom) Dave Pinkney | All |
| Team Eurotech Racing with John Guest | Honda Integra Type-R | 77 | (United Kingdom) Mike Jordan | All |
| Thurlby Motors Boston Bowl with Tech-Speed | Vauxhall Astra Coupé | 82 | (United Kingdom) Fiona Leggate | 1–7 |
| Thurlby Motors Boston Bowl with Tech-Speed | Vauxhall Astra Coupé | 82 | (United Kingdom) Paul O'Neill | 9–10 |
Independent S2000 Entries
| Geoff Steel Racing | BMW 320i | 15 | (United Kingdom) Martyn Bell | All |
| Quest Racing | Alfa Romeo 156 | 17 | (Republic of Ireland) Eoin Murray | 5–7, 9–10 |
| Xero Competition | Lexus IS200 | 21 | (United Kingdom) Adam Jones | 3–6, 8–10 |
| Team Forward Racing | Lexus IS200 | 79 | (United Kingdom) Mark Jones | 9–10 |
| Motorbase Performance | SEAT Toledo Cupra | 23 | (United Kingdom) Tom Ferrier | 10 |
| BTC Racing | Lexus IS200 | 42 | (United Kingdom) Darren Dowling | 9–10 |
| BTC Racing | Lexus IS200 | 43 | (United Kingdom) Chris Stockton | 9–10 |
| InFront Motorsport | Alfa Romeo 156 | 66 | (United Kingdom) Mark Smith | 1, 3–7, 9–10 |

== Season Calendar ==
All races were held in the United Kingdom (excepting Mondello Park round that held in Ireland).

| Round | | Circuit | Date | Pole position | Fastest lap | Winning driver | Winning team |
|---|---|---|---|---|---|---|---|
| 1 | R1 | Brands Hatch Indy, Kent | 9 April | (United Kingdom) Tom Chilton | (United Kingdom) Tom Chilton | (United Kingdom) James Thompson | SEAT Sport UK |
| 1 | R2 | Brands Hatch Indy, Kent | 9 April | | (United Kingdom) Jason Plato | (United Kingdom) James Thompson | SEAT Sport UK |
| 1 | R3 | Brands Hatch Indy, Kent | 9 April | | (United Kingdom) Gordon Shedden | (United Kingdom) Jason Plato | SEAT Sport UK |
| 2 | R4 | Mondello Park | 23 April | (United Kingdom) Matt Neal | (United Kingdom) Matt Neal | (United Kingdom) Matt Neal | Team Halfords |
| 2 | R5 | Mondello Park | 23 April | | (United Kingdom) Jason Plato | (United Kingdom) Matt Neal | Team Halfords |
| 2 | R6 | Mondello Park | 23 April | | (United Kingdom) Rob Collard | (United Kingdom) Mike Jordan | Team Eurotech Racing |
| 3 | R7 | Oulton Park Island, Cheshire | 14 May | (United Kingdom) Jason Plato | (United Kingdom) Jason Plato | (United Kingdom) Gordon Shedden | Team Halfords |
| 3 | R8 | Oulton Park Island, Cheshire | 14 May | | (United Kingdom) Colin Turkington | (United Kingdom) Matt Neal | Team Halfords |
| 3 | R9 | Oulton Park Island, Cheshire | 14 May | | (United Kingdom) Jason Plato | (United Kingdom) Jason Plato | SEAT Sport UK |
| 4 | R10 | Thruxton Circuit, Hampshire | 4 June | (United Kingdom) Gordon Shedden | (United Kingdom) Gordon Shedden | (United Kingdom) Gordon Shedden | Team Halfords |
| 4 | R11 | Thruxton Circuit, Hampshire | 4 June | | (United Kingdom) David Pinkney | (United Kingdom) Matt Neal | Team Halfords |
| 4 | R12 | Thruxton Circuit, Hampshire | 4 June | | (United Kingdom) Colin Turkington | (United Kingdom) Colin Turkington | Team RAC |
| 5 | R13 | Croft Circuit, Yorkshire | 16 July | (United Kingdom) James Thompson | (United Kingdom) James Thompson | (United Kingdom) Jason Plato | SEAT Sport UK |
| 5 | R14 | Croft Circuit, Yorkshire | 16 July | | (United Kingdom) Gordon Shedden | (United Kingdom) Matt Neal | Team Halfords |
| 5 | R15 | Croft Circuit, Yorkshire | 16 July | | (United Kingdom) Gordon Shedden | (United Kingdom) James Thompson | SEAT Sport UK |
| 6 | R16 | Donington Park National | 30 July | (United Kingdom) Gordon Shedden | (United Kingdom) Gordon Shedden | (United Kingdom) Gordon Shedden | Team Halfords |
| 6 | R17 | Donington Park National | 30 July | | (United Kingdom) Rob Collard | (United Kingdom) Gordon Shedden | Team Halfords |
| 6 | R18 | Donington Park National | 30 July | | (United Kingdom) Colin Turkington | (United Kingdom) Colin Turkington | Team RAC |
| 7 | R19 | Snetterton Motor Racing Circuit, Norfolk | 13 August | (United Kingdom) Jason Plato | (Republic of Ireland) Gavin Smith | (United Kingdom) Jason Plato | SEAT Sport UK |
| 7 | R20 | Snetterton Motor Racing Circuit, Norfolk | 13 August | | (United Kingdom) Colin Turkington | (United Kingdom) Jason Plato | SEAT Sport UK |
| 7 | R21 | Snetterton Motor Racing Circuit, Norfolk | 13 August | | (United Kingdom) Gordon Shedden | (United Kingdom) Matt Neal | Team Halfords |
| 8 | R22 | Knockhill Racing Circuit, Fife | 3 September | (United Kingdom) Jason Plato | (United Kingdom) Gordon Shedden | (United Kingdom) Jason Plato | SEAT Sport UK |
| 8 | R23 | Knockhill Racing Circuit, Fife | 3 September | | (United Kingdom) Colin Turkington | (Italy) Fabrizio Giovanardi | VX Racing |
| 8 | R24 | Knockhill Racing Circuit, Fife | 3 September | | (United Kingdom) Gordon Shedden | (United Kingdom) Matt Neal | Team Halfords |
| 9 | R25 | Brands Hatch Indy, Kent | 24 September | (United Kingdom) Jason Plato | (United Kingdom) Jason Plato | (United Kingdom) Jason Plato | SEAT Sport UK |
| 9 | R26 | Brands Hatch Indy, Kent | 24 September | | (United Kingdom) Jason Plato | (United Kingdom) Jason Plato | SEAT Sport UK |
| 9 | R27 | Brands Hatch Indy, Kent | 24 September | | (United Kingdom) Tom Chilton | (Italy) Fabrizio Giovanardi | VX Racing |
| 10 | R28 | Silverstone National | 15 October | (United Kingdom) Gareth Howell | (United Kingdom) Gareth Howell | (United Kingdom) Gareth Howell | Team Halfords |
| 10 | R29 | Silverstone National | 15 October | | (United Kingdom) Gordon Shedden | (United Kingdom) Matt Neal | Team Halfords |
| 10 | R30 | Silverstone National | 15 October | | (United Kingdom) Gareth Howell | (United Kingdom) Gareth Howell | Team Halfords |

== Championship standings ==
=== Drivers' Championship ===
| Pos | Driver | BHI | | | MON | | | OUL | | | THR | | | CRO | | | DON | | | SNE | | | KNO | | | BHI | | | SIL | | | Pts |
|---|---|---|---|---|---|---|---|---|---|---|---|---|---|---|---|---|---|---|---|---|---|---|---|---|---|---|---|---|---|---|---|---|
| 1 | (United Kingdom) Matt Neal | 3 | 3 | Ret | **1*** | **1*** | 3 | 4 | 1* | 8 | 2 | 1* | 2 | 3 | 1* | 4 | 4 | 5 | 7 | 6 | 8 | 1* | 2 | 5 | 1* | 2 | 2 | Ret | 4 | 1* | Ret | 289 |
| 2 | (United Kingdom) Jason Plato | Ret | 5 | 1* | 2 | 2 | 8 | **14*** | 6 | 1* | Ret | Ret | 3 | 1* | **2*** | 3 | 7 | Ret | Ret | **1*** | **1*** | 6 | **1*** | **Ret*** | DNS | **1*** | **1*** | 3 | 8 | Ret | 4 | 241 |
| 3 | (United Kingdom) Colin Turkington | 4 | 2 | 2 | 4 | 3 | 2 | 7 | 17 | 5 | 8 | 6 | 1* | 4 | 3 | 2 | 2* | 8 | 1* | Ret | 3 | 4 | 7 | 9 | Ret* | 3 | 3 | 4 | 2 | DSQ | 2 | 240 |
| 4 | (United Kingdom) Gordon Shedden | Ret | Ret | 4 | 5 | DSQ | 6 | 1* | **3** | Ret | **1*** | **2** | 11 | 12 | 4 | 17 | **1*** | **1*** | 3 | Ret | 6 | 5 | 6 | Ret | 2* | 7 | 4 | 2 | 6 | 2 | Ret | 204 |
| 5 | (Italy) Fabrizio Giovanardi | Ret | 8 | 6 | 7 | Ret | 5 | 5 | 2 | 9 | Ret | 8 | 12 | 6 | Ret | 5 | 3 | 4* | 2 | 3 | Ret | Ret | 4 | 1* | 6 | 6 | 5 | 1* | 7 | 3 | 16 | 163 |
| 6 | (United Kingdom) James Thompson | 1* | **1*** | 5 | 3 | Ret | 4 | 11 | 4 | 2* | | | | **2*** | 5 | 1* | | | | 2 | 2 | 2 | | | | | | | 5 | Ret | 5 | 162 |
| 7 | (United Kingdom) Tom Chilton | **2*** | 7 | **3*** | 6 | Ret | 9 | 9 | 7 | **3*** | 4 | 9 | 8 | Ret | 8 | 6 | 5 | Ret | 6 | Ret | 7 | 3* | 12 | Ret | Ret | 4 | 6 | **8*** | 3 | Ret | 3 | 139 |
| 8 | (Republic of Ireland) Gavin Smith | 6 | 4 | 7 | 8 | 5 | 7 | 8 | 10 | 6 | 6 | 12 | 7 | 9 | 6 | **8*** | 6 | 2 | 5 | 4 | Ret | 7 | Ret | 2 | 5 | Ret | NC | 10 | 11 | 4 | 10 | 123 |
| 9 | (United Kingdom) Rob Collard | 7 | 6 | DSQ | Ret | 10 | Ret | 6 | 5 | 4 | 5 | 3 | 6 | 5 | Ret | 10 | 9 | 13 | Ret | 11 | 5 | Ret | Ret | Ret | 7 | 5 | 7 | 6 | 10 | 5 | 7 | 97 |
| 10 | (United Kingdom) Mike Jordan | 5 | Ret | Ret | 9 | 7 | 1* | 2 | 12 | 7 | Ret | Ret | Ret | 11 | 10 | 7 | 8 | 3 | Ret | 5 | 4 | 12 | 5 | Ret | DNS | 8 | Ret | 7 | 9 | Ret | DNS | 91 |
| 11 | (United Kingdom) Gareth Howell | | | | | | | | | | | | | | | | | | | 7 | 9 | **Ret** | 3 | 7 | 3 | Ret | 8 | 5 | **1*** | **6*** | 1* | 80 |
| 12 | (United Kingdom) James Kaye | 8 | 9 | Ret | 10 | 6 | DNS | 3 | 9 | DNS | 7 | 7 | **4** | 8 | 7 | 9 | 10 | 7 | 8 | 9 | Ret | 8 | Ret | Ret | DNS | 11 | 13 | Ret | DNS | Ret | Ret | 61 |
| 13 | (United Kingdom) David Pinkney | Ret | 10 | 8 | 13 | 4 | 10 | 10 | 8 | Ret | Ret | 4 | 5 | 7 | 9 | Ret | 11 | Ret | 9 | 12 | Ret | 11 | Ret | 3 | 9 | 9 | 9 | Ret | 13 | 11 | 12 | 56 |
| 14 | (United Kingdom) Darren Turner | | | | | | | | | | 3 | 5 | Ret | | | | 12 | 9 | **4** | | | | 10 | DSQ | 4 | Ret | Ret | DNS | Ret | 10 | 6 | 41 |
| 15 | (United Kingdom) Jason Hughes | 9 | 11 | 9 | 11 | DNS | Ret | 12 | Ret | 10 | 9 | 10 | 9 | 14 | 12 | 11 | 15 | Ret | Ret | 10 | Ret | 15 | 8 | 4 | Ret | Ret | 10 | 9 | 15 | 9 | **11** | 27 |
| 16 | (United Kingdom) Mark Proctor | Ret | Ret | DNS | 12 | 8 | **Ret** | 13 | 11 | 13 | DNS | DNS | DNS | Ret | 14 | Ret | | | | 8 | 11 | 9 | 9 | 6 | **8** | | | | | | | 18 |
| 17 | (Republic of Ireland) Eoin Murray | | | | | | | | | | | | | 10 | 11 | 12 | 13 | 6 | Ret | Ret | 10 | 10 | | | | Ret | DNS | DNS | Ret | DNS | DNS | 8 |
| 18 | (United Kingdom) Martyn Bell | 10 | Ret | Ret | 15 | 9 | 11 | Ret | 13 | 14 | 12 | Ret | DNS | 16 | 15 | 16 | 14 | 12 | 10 | 14 | Ret | 13 | Ret | 8 | 10 | 14 | Ret | 13 | 16 | Ret | 15 | 8 |
| 19 | (United Kingdom) Tom Ferrier | | | | | | | | | | | | | | | | | | | | | | | | | | | | 12 | 7 | 8 | 7 |
| 20 | (United Kingdom) Paul O'Neill | | | | | | | | | | | | | | | | | | | | | | | | | 10 | 11 | 11 | 14 | 8 | 9* | 7 |
| 21 | (United Kingdom) Fiona Leggate | Ret | 12 | 10 | 14 | Ret | DNS | 15 | 14 | 11 | 10 | 13 | 10 | Ret | 16 | 14 | DNS | DNS | DNS | 13 | 12 | Ret | | | | | | | | | | 3 |
| 22 | (United Kingdom) Adam Jones | | | | | | | Ret | 15 | 12 | 11 | 11 | 13 | 13 | 13 | 13 | 16 | 10 | Ret | | | | 11 | Ret | DNS | 12 | Ret | 12 | DNS | DNS | DNS | 1 |
| 23 | (United Kingdom) Mark Smith | 11 | Ret | DNS | | | | 16 | 16 | Ret | NC | 14 | 14 | 17 | 17 | 18 | 17 | 11 | Ret | Ret | Ret | 16 | | | | 17 | 14 | 14 | 18 | 13 | 13 | 0 |
| 24 | (United Kingdom) Chris Stockton | | | | | | | | | | | | | | | | | | | | | | | | | 13 | 12 | Ret | 19 | 16 | Ret | 0 |
| 25 | (United Kingdom) Richard Marsh | | | | | | | | | | | | | | | | 18 | Ret | DNS | DNS | DNS | DNS | Ret | DNS | Ret | DNS | DNS | DNS | 17 | 12 | 14 | 0 |
| 26 | (Turkey) Erkut Kizilirmak | | | | | | | | | | | | | 15 | Ret | 15 | | | | Ret | 13 | 14 | | | | | | | | | | 0 |
| 27 | (United Kingdom) Darren Dowling | | | | | | | | | | | | | | | | | | | | | | | | | 16 | Ret | 15 | 20 | 14 | Ret | 0 |
| 28 | (United Kingdom) Nick Leason | | | | | | | | | | | | | | | | | | | | | | | | | 15 | DNS | DNS | NC | 15 | DNS | 0 |
| 29 | (United Kingdom) Mark Jones | | | | | | | | | | | | | | | | | | | | | | | | | 18 | Ret | 16 | Ret | NC | Ret | 0 |
| Pos | Driver | BHI | | | MON | | | OUL | | | THR | | | CRO | | | DON | | | SNE | | | KNO | | | BHI | | | SIL | | | Pts |
Sources:

- Note: **bold** signifies pole position (1 point given in first race only, and race 2 and 3 poles are based on race results), italics signifies fastest lap (1 point given all races) and * signifies at least one lap in the lead (1 point given all races).

=== Manufacturers Championship ===
| Pos | Manufacturer | BHI | | | MON | | | OUL | | | THR | | | CRO | | | DON | | | SNE | | | KNO | | | BHI | | | SIL | | | Pts |
|---|---|---|---|---|---|---|---|---|---|---|---|---|---|---|---|---|---|---|---|---|---|---|---|---|---|---|---|---|---|---|---|---|
| 1 | SEAT / SEAT Sport UK | 1 | 1 | 1 | 2 | 2 | 4 | 11 | 4 | 1 | 3 | 5 | 3 | 1 | 2 | 1 | 7 | 9 | 4 | 1 | 1 | 2 | 1 | Ret | 4 | 1 | 1 | 3 | 5 | Ret | 4 | 572 |
| 1 | SEAT / SEAT Sport UK | Ret | 5 | 5 | 3 | Ret | 8 | 14 | 6 | 2 | Ret | Ret | Ret | 2 | 5 | 3 | 12 | Ret | Ret | 2 | 2 | 6 | 10 | DSQ | DNS | Ret | DNS | DNS | 8 | Ret | 5 | 572 |
| 2 | Vauxhall / VX Racing | 2 | 7 | 3 | 6 | Ret | 5 | 5 | 2 | 3 | 4 | 8 | 8 | 6 | 8 | 5 | 3 | 4 | 2 | 3 | 7 | 3 | 4 | 1 | 6 | 4 | 5 | 1 | 3 | 3 | 3 | 528 |
| 2 | Vauxhall / VX Racing | Ret | 8 | 6 | 7 | Ret | 9 | 9 | 7 | 9 | Ret | 9 | 12 | Ret | Ret | 6 | 5 | Ret | 6 | Ret | Ret | Ret | 12 | Ret | Ret | 6 | 6 | 8 | 7 | Ret | 16 | 528 |

=== Teams Championship ===
| Pos | Team | BHI | | | MON | | | OUL | | | THR | | | CRO | | | DON | | | SNE | | | KNO | | | BHI | | | SIL | | | Pts |
|---|---|---|---|---|---|---|---|---|---|---|---|---|---|---|---|---|---|---|---|---|---|---|---|---|---|---|---|---|---|---|---|---|
| 1 | Team Halfords | 3 | 3 | 4 | 1 | 1 | 3 | 1 | 1 | 8 | 1 | 1 | 2 | 3 | 1 | 4 | 1 | 1 | 3 | 6 | 6 | 1 | 2 | 5 | 1 | 2 | 2 | 2 | 1 | 1 | 1 | 512 |
| 1 | Team Halfords | Ret | Ret | Ret | 5 | DSQ | 6 | 4 | 3 | Ret | 2 | 2 | 11 | 12 | 4 | 17 | 4 | 5 | 7 | 7 | 8 | 5 | 3 | 7 | 2 | 7 | 4 | 5 | 4 | 2 | Ret | 512 |
| 2 | SEAT Sport UK | 1 | 1 | 1 | 2 | 2 | 4 | 11 | 4 | 1 | 3 | 5 | 3 | 1 | 2 | 1 | 7 | 9 | 4 | 1 | 1 | 2 | 1 | Ret | 4 | 1 | 1 | 3 | 5 | 10 | 4 | 418 |
| 2 | SEAT Sport UK | Ret | 5 | 5 | 3 | Ret | 8 | 14 | 6 | 2 | Ret | Ret | Ret | 2 | 5 | 3 | 12 | Ret | Ret | 2 | 2 | 6 | 10 | DSQ | DNS | Ret | DNS | DNS | 8 | Ret | 5 | 418 |
| 3 | VX Racing | 2 | 4 | 3 | 6 | 5 | 5 | 5 | 2 | 3 | 4 | 8 | 7 | 6 | 6 | 5 | 3 | 2 | 2 | 3 | 7 | 3 | 4 | 1 | 5 | 4 | 5 | 1 | 3 | 3 | 3 | 386 |
| 3 | VX Racing | 6 | 7 | 6 | 7 | Ret | 7 | 8 | 7 | 6 | 6 | 9 | 8 | 9 | 8 | 6 | 5 | 4 | 5 | 4 | 13 | 7 | 12 | 2 | 6 | 6 | 6 | 8 | 7 | 4 | 10 | 386 |
| 4 | Team RAC | 4 | 2 | 2 | 4 | 3 | 2 | 6 | 5 | 4 | 5 | 3 | 1 | 4 | 3 | 2 | 2 | 8 | 1 | 11 | 3 | 4 | 7 | 9 | 7 | 3 | 3 | 4 | 2 | 5 | 2 | 332 |
| 4 | Team RAC | 7 | 6 | DSQ | Ret | 10 | Ret | 7 | 17 | 5 | 8 | 6 | 6 | 5 | Ret | 10 | 9 | 13 | Ret | Ret | 5 | Ret | Ret | Ret | Ret | 5 | 7 | 6 | 10 | DSQ | 7 | 332 |
| 5 | Team Eurotech | 5 | Ret | Ret | 9 | 7 | 1 | 2 | 12 | 7 | Ret | Ret | Ret | 11 | 10 | 7 | 8 | 3 | Ret | 5 | 4 | 12 | 5 | Ret | DNS | 8 | Ret | 7 | 9 | Ret | DNS | 93 |
| 6 | Motorbase Performance | Ret | 10 | 8 | 13 | 4 | 10 | 10 | 8 | Ret | Ret | 4 | 5 | 7 | 9 | Ret | 11 | Ret | 9 | 12 | Ret | 11 | Ret | 3 | 9 | 9 | 9 | Ret | 12 | 7 | 8 | 74 |
| 6 | Motorbase Performance | | | | | | | | | | | | | | | | | | | | | | | | | | | | 13 | 11 | 12 | 74 |
| 7 | Synchro Motorsport | 8 | 9 | Ret | 10 | 6 | DNS | 3 | 9 | DNS | 7 | 7 | 4 | 8 | 7 | 9 | 10 | 7 | 8 | 9 | Ret | 8 | Ret | Ret | DNS | 11 | 13 | Ret | DNS | DNS | Ret | 66 |
| 8 | Kartworld Racing | 9 | 11 | 9 | 11 | DNS | Ret | 12 | Ret | 10 | 9 | 10 | 9 | 14 | 12 | 11 | 15 | Ret | Ret | 10 | Ret | 15 | 8 | 4 | Ret | Ret | 10 | 9 | 15 | 9 | 11 | 36 |
| 9 | Fast-Tech Motorsport | Ret | Ret | DNS | 12 | 8 | Ret | 13 | 11 | 13 | DNS | DNS | DNS | Ret | 14 | Ret | | | | 8 | 11 | 9 | 9 | 6 | 8 | | | | | | | 22 |
| 10 | Tech-Speed Motorsport | Ret | 12 | 10 | 14 | Ret | DNS | 15 | 14 | 11 | 10 | 13 | 10 | Ret | 16 | 14 | DNS | DNS | DNS | 13 | 12 | Ret | | | | 10 | 11 | 11 | 14 | 8 | 9 | 15 |
| 11 | Geoff Steel Racing | 10 | Ret | Ret | 15 | 9 | 11 | Ret | 13 | 14 | 12 | Ret | DNS | 16 | 15 | 16 | 14 | 12 | 10 | 14 | Ret | 13 | Ret | 8 | 10 | 14 | Ret | 13 | 16 | Ret | 15 | 11 |
| 12 | Quest Racing | | | | | | | | | | | | | 10 | 11 | 12 | 13 | 6 | Ret | Ret | 10 | 10 | | | | Ret | DNS | DNS | Ret | DNS | DNS | 9 |
| 13 | Xero Competition | | | | | | | Ret | 15 | 12 | 11 | 11 | 13 | 13 | 13 | 13 | 16 | 10 | Ret | | | | 11 | Ret | DNS | 12 | Ret | 12 | DNS | DNS | DNS | 2 |
| 14 | InFront Motorsport | 11 | Ret | DNS | | | | 16 | 16 | Ret | NC | 14 | 14 | 17 | 17 | 18 | 17 | 11 | Ret | Ret | Ret | 16 | | | | 17 | 14 | 14 | 18 | 13 | 13 | 0 |
| 15 | BTC Racing | | | | | | | | | | | | | | | | | | | | | | | | | 13 | 12 | 15 | 19 | 14 | Ret | 0 |
| 15 | BTC Racing | | | | | | | | | | | | | | | | | | | | | | | | | 16 | Ret | Ret | 20 | 16 | Ret | 0 |
| 16 | Team Farécla | | | | | | | | | | | | | | | | 18 | Ret | DNS | DNS | DNS | DNS | Ret | DNS | Ret | DNS | DNS | DNS | 17 | 12 | 14 | 0 |
| 17 | NJL Racing with Daniels Motorsport | | | | | | | | | | | | | | | | | | | | | | | | | 15 | DNS | DNS | NC | 15 | DNS | 0 |
| 18 | Team Forward Racing | | | | | | | | | | | | | | | | | | | | | | | | | 18 | Ret | 16 | Ret | NC | Ret | 0 |
| Pos | Team | BHI | | | MON | | | OUL | | | THR | | | CRO | | | DON | | | SNE | | | KNO | | | BHI | | | SIL | | | Pts |

=== Independents Trophy ===
| Pos | Driver | BHI | | | MON | | | OUL | | | THR | | | CRO | | | DON | | | SNE | | | KNO | | | BHI | | | SIL | | | Pts |
|---|---|---|---|---|---|---|---|---|---|---|---|---|---|---|---|---|---|---|---|---|---|---|---|---|---|---|---|---|---|---|---|---|
| 1 | (United Kingdom) Matt Neal | 3 | **3** | Ret | **1** | **1** | 3 | 4 | 1 | 8 | 2 | 1 | 2 | **3** | **1** | 4 | 4 | 5 | 7 | 6 | 8 | 1 | 2 | **5** | 1 | **2** | **2** | Ret | 4 | 1 | Ret | 337 |
| 2 | (United Kingdom) Colin Turkington | **4** | 2 | 2 | 4 | 3 | 2 | 7 | 17 | 5 | 8 | 6 | 1 | 4 | 3 | 2 | 2 | 8 | **1** | Ret | 3 | 4 | 7 | 9 | Ret | 3 | 3 | 4 | 2 | DSQ | 2 | 290 |
| 3 | (United Kingdom) Gordon Shedden | Ret | Ret | 4 | 5 | DSQ | 6 | 1 | **3** | Ret | **1** | **2** | 11 | 12 | 4 | **17** | **1** | **1** | 3 | **Ret** | 6 | 5 | **6** | Ret | 2 | 6 | 4 | **2** | 6 | 2 | Ret | 233 |
| 4 | (United Kingdom) Rob Collard | 7 | 6 | **DSQ** | Ret | 10 | Ret | 6 | 5 | **4** | 5 | 3 | 6 | 5 | Ret | 10 | 9 | 13 | Ret | 11 | 5 | Ret | Ret | Ret | 7 | 5 | 7 | 6 | 10 | 5 | 7 | 174 |
| 5 | (United Kingdom) Mike Jordan | 5 | Ret | Ret | 9 | 7 | 1 | 2 | 12 | 7 | Ret | Ret | Ret | 11 | 10 | 7 | 8 | 3 | Ret | 5 | **4** | 12 | 5 | Ret | DNS | 8 | Ret | 7 | 9 | Ret | DNS | 162 |
| 6 | (United Kingdom) James Kaye | 8 | 9 | Ret | 10 | 6 | DNS | 3 | 9 | DNS | 7 | 7 | **4** | 8 | 7 | 9 | 10 | 7 | 8 | 9 | Ret | 8 | Ret | Ret | DNS | 11 | 13 | Ret | DNS | DNS | Ret | 126 |
| 7 | (United Kingdom) David Pinkney | Ret | 10 | 8 | 13 | 4 | 10 | 10 | 8 | Ret | Ret | 4 | 5 | 7 | 9 | Ret | 11 | Ret | 9 | 12 | Ret | 11 | Ret | 3 | 9 | 9 | 9 | Ret | 13 | 11 | 12 | 124 |
| 8 | (United Kingdom) Jason Hughes | 9 | 11 | 9 | 11 | DNS | Ret | 12 | Ret | 10 | 9 | 10 | 9 | 14 | 12 | 11 | 15 | Ret | Ret | 10 | Ret | 15 | 8 | 4 | Ret | Ret | 10 | 9 | 15 | 9 | **11** | 98 |
| 9 | (United Kingdom) Gareth Howell | | | | | | | | | | | | | | | | | | | 7 | 9 | **Ret** | 3 | 7 | 3 | Ret | 8 | 5 | **1** | **6** | 1 | 97 |
| 10 | (United Kingdom) Mark Proctor | Ret | Ret | DNS | 12 | 8 | **Ret** | 13 | 11 | 13 | DNS | DNS | DNS | Ret | 14 | Ret | | | | 8 | 11 | 9 | 9 | 6 | **8** | | | | | | | 55 |
| 11 | (United Kingdom) Martyn Bell | 10 | Ret | Ret | 15 | 9 | 11 | **Ret** | 13 | 14 | 12 | Ret | DNS | 16 | 15 | 16 | 14 | 12 | 10 | 14 | Ret | 13 | Ret | 8 | 10 | 14 | Ret | 13 | 16 | Ret | 15 | 46 |
| 12 | (United Kingdom) Fiona Leggate | Ret | 12 | 10 | 14 | Ret | DNS | 15 | 14 | 11 | 10 | 13 | 10 | Ret | 16 | 14 | DNS | DNS | DNS | 13 | 12 | Ret | | | | | | | | | | 36 |
| 13 | (Republic of Ireland) Eoin Murray | | | | | | | | | | | | | 10 | 11 | 12 | 13 | 6 | Ret | Ret | 10 | 10 | | | | Ret | DNS | DNS | Ret | DNS | DNS | 33 |
| 14 | (United Kingdom) Adam Jones | | | | | | | Ret | 15 | 12 | 11 | 11 | 13 | 13 | 13 | 13 | 16 | 10 | Ret | | | | 11 | Ret | DNS | 12 | Ret | 12 | DNS | DNS | DNS | 32 |
| 15 | (United Kingdom) Paul O'Neill | | | | | | | | | | | | | | | | | | | | | | | | | 10 | 11 | 11 | 14 | 8 | 9 | 24 |
| 16 | (United Kingdom) Tom Ferrier | | | | | | | | | | | | | | | | | | | | | | | | | | | | 12 | 7 | 8 | 18 |
| 17 | (United Kingdom) Mark Smith | 11 | Ret | DNS | | | | 16 | 16 | Ret | NC | 14 | 14 | 17 | 17 | 18 | 17 | 11 | Ret | Ret | Ret | 16 | | | | 17 | 14 | 14 | 18 | 13 | 13 | 13 |
| 18 | (United Kingdom) Richard Marsh | | | | | | | | | | | | | | | | 18 | Ret | DNS | DNS | DNS | DNS | Ret | DNS | Ret | DNS | DNS | DNS | 17 | 12 | 14 | 4 |
| 19 | (United Kingdom) Chris Stockton | | | | | | | | | | | | | | | | | | | | | | | | | 13 | 12 | Ret | 19 | 16 | Ret | 3 |
| 20 | (United Kingdom) Darren Dowling | | | | | | | | | | | | | | | | | | | | | | | | | 16 | Ret | 15 | 20 | 14 | Ret | 0 |
| 21 | (United Kingdom) Nick Leason | | | | | | | | | | | | | | | | | | | | | | | | | 15 | DNS | DNS | NC | 15 | DNS | 0 |
| 22 | (United Kingdom) Mark Jones | | | | | | | | | | | | | | | | | | | | | | | | | 18 | Ret | 16 | Ret | NC | Ret | 0 |
| Pos | Driver | BHI | | | MON | | | OUL | | | THR | | | CRO | | | DON | | | SNE | | | KNO | | | BHI | | | SIL | | | Pts |

=== Independent Teams Championship ===
| Pos | Team | BHI | | | MON | | | OUL | | | THR | | | CRO | | | DON | | | SNE | | | KNO | | | BHI | | | SIL | | | Pts |
|---|---|---|---|---|---|---|---|---|---|---|---|---|---|---|---|---|---|---|---|---|---|---|---|---|---|---|---|---|---|---|---|---|
| 1 | Team Halfords | 3 | 3 | 4 | 1 | 1 | 3 | 1 | 1 | 8 | 1 | 1 | 2 | 3 | 1 | 4 | 1 | 1 | 3 | 6 | 6 | 1 | 2 | 5 | 1 | 2 | 2 | 2 | 1 | 1 | 1 | 622 |
| 1 | Team Halfords | Ret | Ret | Ret | 5 | DSQ | 6 | 4 | 3 | Ret | 2 | 2 | 11 | 12 | 4 | 17 | 4 | 5 | 7 | 7 | 8 | 5 | 3 | 7 | 2 | 7 | 4 | 5 | 4 | 2 | Ret | 622 |
| 2 | Team RAC | 4 | 2 | 2 | 4 | 3 | 2 | 6 | 5 | 4 | 5 | 3 | 1 | 4 | 3 | 2 | 2 | 8 | 1 | 11 | 3 | 4 | 7 | 9 | 7 | 3 | 3 | 4 | 2 | 5 | 2 | 469 |
| 2 | Team RAC | 7 | 6 | DSQ | Ret | 10 | Ret | 7 | 17 | 5 | 8 | 6 | 6 | 5 | Ret | 10 | 9 | 13 | Ret | Ret | 5 | Ret | Ret | Ret | Ret | 5 | 7 | 6 | 10 | DSQ | 7 | 469 |
| 3 | Team Eurotech | 5 | Ret | Ret | 9 | 7 | 1 | 2 | 12 | 7 | Ret | Ret | Ret | 11 | 10 | 7 | 8 | 3 | Ret | 5 | 4 | 12 | 5 | Ret | DNS | 8 | Ret | 7 | 9 | Ret | DNS | 164 |
| 4 | Motorbase Performance | Ret | 10 | 8 | 13 | 4 | 10 | 10 | 8 | Ret | Ret | 4 | 5 | 7 | 9 | Ret | 11 | Ret | 9 | 12 | Ret | 11 | Ret | 3 | 9 | 9 | 9 | Ret | 12 | 7 | 8 | 159 |
| 4 | Motorbase Performance | | | | | | | | | | | | | | | | | | | | | | | | | | | | 13 | 11 | 12 | 159 |
| 5 | Synchro Motorsport | 8 | 9 | Ret | 10 | 6 | DNS | 3 | 9 | DNS | 7 | 7 | 4 | 8 | 7 | 9 | 10 | 7 | 8 | 9 | Ret | 8 | Ret | Ret | DNS | 11 | 13 | Ret | DNS | DNS | Ret | 127 |
| 6 | Kartworld Racing | 9 | 11 | 9 | 11 | DNS | Ret | 12 | Ret | 10 | 9 | 10 | 9 | 14 | 12 | 11 | 15 | Ret | Ret | 10 | Ret | 15 | 8 | 4 | Ret | Ret | 10 | 9 | 15 | 9 | 11 | 102 |
| 7 | Tech-Speed Motorsport | Ret | 12 | 10 | 14 | Ret | DNS | 15 | 14 | 11 | 10 | 13 | 10 | Ret | 16 | 14 | DNS | DNS | DNS | 13 | 12 | Ret | | | | 10 | 11 | 11 | 14 | 8 | 9 | 64 |
| 8 | Fast-Tech Motorsport | Ret | Ret | DNS | 12 | 8 | Ret | 13 | 11 | 13 | DNS | DNS | DNS | Ret | 14 | Ret | | | | 8 | 11 | 9 | 9 | 6 | 8 | | | | | | | 59 |
| 9 | Geoff Steel Racing | 10 | Ret | Ret | 15 | 9 | 11 | Ret | 13 | 14 | 12 | Ret | DNS | 16 | 15 | 16 | 14 | 12 | 10 | 14 | Ret | 13 | Ret | 8 | 10 | 14 | Ret | 13 | 16 | Ret | 15 | 48 |
| 10 | Quest Racing | | | | | | | | | | | | | 10 | 11 | 12 | 13 | 6 | Ret | Ret | 10 | 10 | | | | Ret | DNS | DNS | Ret | DNS | DNS | 34 |
| 11 | Xero Competition | | | | | | | Ret | 15 | 12 | 11 | 11 | 13 | 13 | 13 | 13 | 16 | 10 | Ret | | | | 11 | Ret | DNS | 12 | Ret | 12 | DNS | DNS | DNS | 33 |
| 12 | InFront Motorsport | 11 | Ret | DNS | | | | 16 | 16 | Ret | NC | 14 | 14 | 17 | 17 | 18 | 17 | 11 | Ret | Ret | Ret | 16 | | | | 17 | 14 | 14 | 18 | 13 | 13 | 15 |
| 13 | BTC Racing | | | | | | | | | | | | | | | | | | | | | | | | | 13 | 12 | 15 | 19 | 14 | Ret | 5 |
| 13 | BTC Racing | | | | | | | | | | | | | | | | | | | | | | | | | 16 | Ret | Ret | 20 | 16 | Ret | 5 |
| 14 | Team Farécla | | | | | | | | | | | | | | | | 18 | Ret | DNS | DNS | DNS | DNS | Ret | DNS | Ret | DNS | DNS | DNS | 17 | 12 | 14 | 5 |
| 15 | NJL Racing with Daniels Motorsport | | | | | | | | | | | | | | | | | | | | | | | | | 15 | DNS | DNS | NC | 15 | DNS | 0 |
| 16 | Team Forward Racing | | | | | | | | | | | | | | | | | | | | | | | | | 18 | Ret | 16 | Ret | NC | Ret | 0 |
| Pos | Driver | BHI | | | MON | | | OUL | | | THR | | | CRO | | | DON | | | SNE | | | KNO | | | BHI | | | SIL | | | Pts |
