= 2006 British GT Championship =

Sports car racing season

Seasons
- ← 2005 2007 →

The 2006 British GT season consisted of a fourteen-round series of sports car racing in the British GT Championship. The season consisted of two 2-hour enduros at Donington Park and Silverstone, with 4 other double 1 hour-race events held in England, 2 in France (held alongside the FFSA GT Championship) and 1 in Ireland. It was contested by GT2 cars, the renamed GT3 class (now GTC), and a new GT3 class conforming with new FIA regulations. This would be the last year of competition for GT2 cars, with very low grids and thus half points being awarded at most races. The following year, GT3 became the main class, with GTC supporting.

== Calendar ==
Round	Circuit	Date	GT2 Winners	GT3 Winners	GTC Winners
1	(United Kingdom) Oulton Park	16 April	(United Kingdom) Tim Mullen (Canada) Chris Niarchos	none	(United Kingdom) Chris Beighton (United Kingdom) Jon Finnemore
2	(United Kingdom) Oulton Park	17 April	(United Kingdom) Tim Mullen (Canada) Chris Niarchos	none	(United Kingdom) Chris Beighton (United Kingdom) Jon Finnemore
3	(United Kingdom) Donington Park	21 May	(United Kingdom) Tim Mullen (Canada) Chris Niarchos	(Russia) Leo Machitski (United Kingdom) Piers Johnson	(United Kingdom) Chris Beighton (United Kingdom) Jon Finnemore
4	(France) Pau	4 June	none	(United Kingdom) Paul Whight (United Kingdom) Chris Randell	(United Kingdom) Matt Allison (United Kingdom) Jonny Lang
5	(France) Pau	5 June	none	(United Kingdom) Barrie Whight (United Kingdom) Gavan Kershaw	(United Kingdom) Danny Watts (United Kingdom) Ryan Hooker
6	(Republic of Ireland) Mondello Park	24 June	(United Kingdom) Luke Hines (United Kingdom) Tom Kimber-Smith	(United Kingdom) Barrie Whight (United Kingdom) Gavan Kershaw	(United Kingdom) Matt Allison (United Kingdom) Jonny Lang
7	(Republic of Ireland) Mondello Park	25 June	(United Kingdom) Luke Hines (United Kingdom) Tom Kimber-Smith	(United Kingdom) Barrie Whight (United Kingdom) Gavan Kershaw	(United Kingdom) Chris Beighton (United Kingdom) Jon Finnemore
8	(United Kingdom) Snetterton	15 July	(United Kingdom) Tim Mullen (Canada) Chris Niarchos	(United Kingdom) Aaron Scott (United Kingdom) Stuart Turvey	(United Kingdom) Andrea Demetriou (United Kingdom) Ryan Hooker
9	(United Kingdom) Snetterton	16 July	(United Kingdom) Tim Mullen (Canada) Chris Niarchos	(United Kingdom) Aaron Scott (United Kingdom) Stuart Turvey	(United Kingdom) Matt Allison (United Kingdom) Jonny Lang
10	(United Kingdom) Rockingham	12 August	(United Kingdom) Tim Mullen (Canada) Chris Niarchos	(Russia) Leo Machitski (United Kingdom) Jonny Cocker	(United Kingdom) Matt Allison (United Kingdom) Jonny Lang
11	(United Kingdom) Rockingham	13 August	(United Kingdom) Tim Mullen (Canada) Chris Niarchos	(United Kingdom) Barrie Whight (United Kingdom) Gavan Kershaw	(United Kingdom) Alex Mortimer (United Kingdom) Bradley Ellis
12	(United Kingdom) Brands Hatch	26 August	(United Kingdom) Tim Mullen (Canada) Chris Niarchos	(Russia) Leo Machitski (United Kingdom) Jonny Cocker	(United Kingdom) Alex Mortimer (United Kingdom) Bradley Ellis
13	(United Kingdom) Brands Hatch	27 August	(United Kingdom) Tim Mullen (Canada) Chris Niarchos	(Russia) Leo Machitski (United Kingdom) Jonny Cocker	(United Kingdom) Phil Glew (United Kingdom) Tom Ferrier
14	(United Kingdom) Silverstone	24 September	(United Kingdom) Tim Mullen (Canada) Chris Niarchos	(United Kingdom) Matt Harris (United Kingdom) Piers Masarati	(United Kingdom) Phil Keen (United Kingdom) Ryan Hooker
15	(France) Magny-Cours	21 October	(United Kingdom) Luke Hines (United Kingdom) Tom Kimber-Smith	none	none
16	(France) Magny-Cours	22 October	(United Kingdom) Luke Hines (United Kingdom) Tom Kimber-Smith	none	none

- The Pau and Magny-Cours rounds were also both run as rounds of the FFSA GT Championship. At Pau, only GT3 and GTC cars competed; at Magny-Cours, only GT2 cars competed. FFSA GT Championship participants were ineligible for British GT championship points.

== Championship standings ==
=== Drivers' Championships ===
==== GT2 ====
Pos	Driver	OUL (United Kingdom)		DON (United Kingdom)	PAU (France)	MON (Republic of Ireland)		SNE (United Kingdom)		ROC (United Kingdom)		BRH (United Kingdom)		SIL (United Kingdom)	MAG (France)		Pts
1	(Canada) Chris Niarchos	1	1	1		Ret	DNS	1	1	1	1	1	1	1	20	19	73
1	(United Kingdom) Tim Mullen	1	1	1		Ret	DNS	1	1	1	1	1	1	1	20	19	73
3	(United Kingdom) Tom Kimber-Smith	2	2	4		1	1	2	2	17†	2	2	3	2	6	16	71
3	(United Kingdom) Luke Hines	2	2	4		1	1	2	2	17†	2	2	3	2	6	16	71
5	(United Kingdom) Ian Flux	5	6	12				Ret	19†			4	17	5			25
5	(United Kingdom) Kevin Riley	5	6	12				Ret	19†			4	17	5			25
7	(United Kingdom) Phil Keen	3	3	Ret				3	3								15
8	(United Kingdom) David Jones	4	4	5													13.5
8	(United Kingdom) Godfrey Jones	4	4	5													13.5
10	(United Kingdom) Lee Caroline	3	3	Ret				3	DNS								12
10	(United Kingdom) Anthony Mott									14	17†			4			12
10	(United Kingdom) Steve Hyde	DNS	9	Ret						14	17†	NC	19				12
13	(United Kingdom) Lawrence Tomlinson														17	23	7
13	(United Kingdom) Richard Dean														17	23	7
15	(United Kingdom) James Brodie													21			5
16	(United Kingdom) Adam Jones											Ret	2				4
16	(United Kingdom) Peter Lloyd											Ret	2				4
18	(Republic of Ireland) Matt Griffin	DNS	9	Ret													3
19	(India) Phiroze Bilimoria											NC	19				2
NC	(United Kingdom) Ian Stinton													Ret			0
NC	(United Kingdom) Nigel James													Ret			0
NC	(United Kingdom) Elliot Cole													Ret			0
NC	(United Kingdom) Craig Cole													Ret			0
Pos	Driver	OUL (United Kingdom)		DON (United Kingdom)	PAU (France)	MON (Republic of Ireland)		SNE (United Kingdom)		ROC (United Kingdom)		BRH (United Kingdom)		SIL (United Kingdom)	MAG (France)		Pts

Colour	Result
Gold	Winner
Silver	Second place
Bronze	Third place
Green	Points classification
Blue	Non-points classification
Blue	Non-classified finish (NC)
Purple	Retired, not classified (Ret)
Red	Did not qualify (DNQ)
Red	Did not pre-qualify (DNPQ)
Black	Disqualified (DSQ)
White	Did not start (DNS)
White	Withdrew (WD)
White	Race cancelled (C)
Blank	Did not practice (DNP)
Blank	Did not arrive (DNA)
Blank	Excluded (EX)

- Half points awarded where less than 6 cars start (Rounds 1, 6-13, 15, 16)

=== GT2 Teams Standings ===
Pos	Team	OUL (United Kingdom)		DON (United Kingdom)	PAU (France)	MON (Republic of Ireland)		SNE (United Kingdom)		ROC (United Kingdom)		BRH (United Kingdom)		SIL (United Kingdom)	MAG (France)		Pts
1	(United Kingdom) Scuderia Ecosse	1	1	1		Ret	DNS	1	1	1	1	1	1	1	20	19	73
2	(United Kingdom) LNT	2	2	4		1	1	2	2	17†	2	2	3	2	6	16	71
3	(United Kingdom) Rollcentre Racing	5	6	12				Ret	19†			4	17	5			25
4	(Australia) Emotional Engineering	DNS	9	Ret						2	3	Ret	5	4			17.5
5	(United Kingdom) Eclipse Motorsport	3	3	Ret				3	3					Ret			15
6	(United Kingdom) Team Preci Spark	4	4	5													13.5
7	(United Kingdom) Cirtek Motorsport											Ret	2				4
NC	(United Kingdom) Data Protection Solutions													Ret			0
Pos	Driver	OUL (United Kingdom)		DON (United Kingdom)	PAU (France)	MON (Republic of Ireland)		SNE (United Kingdom)		ROC (United Kingdom)		BRH (United Kingdom)		SIL (United Kingdom)	MAG (France)		Pts

==== GTC ====
Pos	Driver	OUL (United Kingdom)		DON (United Kingdom)	PAU (France)		MON (Republic of Ireland)		SNE (United Kingdom)		ROC (United Kingdom)		BRH (United Kingdom)		SIL (United Kingdom)	MAG (France)	Pts
1	(United Kingdom) Matt Allison	NC	7	9	5	Ret	3	6	7	8	3	9	9	10	10		86
1	(United Kingdom) Jonny Lang	NC	7	9	5	Ret	3	6	7	8	3	9	9	10	10		86
3	(United Kingdom) Ryan Hooker	8	8	16	12	6	Ret	5	6	10	4	6	8	11	6		85
4	(United Kingdom) Bradley Ellis	9	10	6	Ret	4	4	12†	19†	Ret	15†	5	7	8	8		72
4	(United Kingdom) Alex Mortimer	9	10	6	Ret	4	4	12†	19†	Ret	15†	5	7	8	8		72
6	(United Kingdom) Oliver Bryant	11	11	Ret	8	5	Ret	4	11	11	9	7	DNS	Ret	14		53
6	(United Kingdom) Keith Ahlers	11	11	Ret	8	5	Ret	4	11	11	9	7	DNS	Ret	14		53
8	(United Kingdom) Chris Beighton	6	5	2			6	3	13	Ret	18†	DNS	23†	Ret			49
8	(United Kingdom) Jon Finnemore	6	5	2			6	3	13	Ret	18†	DNS	23†	Ret			49
10	(United Kingdom) Phil Keen										4	6	8	11	6		38
11	(United Kingdom) Adam Wilcox	20†	16	Ret	Ret	Ret	7	7			5	8	10	15	13		31
11	(United Kingdom) Phil Burton	20†	16	Ret	Ret	Ret	7	7			5	8	10	15	13		31
13	(United Kingdom) Hunter Abbott	12	Ret	15	7	7	Ret	Ret	Ret	12			16	7	18		30
14	(United Kingdom) Phil Glew	12	Ret	15	7	7	Ret	Ret					11	5			29
15	(United Kingdom) Graeme Mundy	15	15	7					14	14	6	Ret	17	12	19		21
16	(United Kingdom) Matt Harris	13	17	13	Ret	11	5	Ret	10	Ret	16	Ret	12	Ret			21
17	(United Kingdom) Callum Lockie	10	13	Ret	NC	17	Ret	8	16	15							19
18	(United Kingdom) Andrea Demetriou								6	10							18
19	(United Kingdom) Miles Hulford	13	17	13	Ret	11	5	Ret	10	Ret	16	Ret					18
20	(United Kingdom) David Dove	10	13	Ret	NC	17			16	15			21	21	Ret		16
21	(United Kingdom) Nigel Greensall	17	19	3			Ret	8			Ret	13					13
22	(United Kingdom) Nigel Redwood								Ret	12	7	10					12
23	(United Kingdom) David Ashburn	8	8	16													12
24	(United Kingdom) Danny Watts				12	6											11
25	(Australia) Neil Cunningham			3											17		11
26	(United Kingdom) Jamie Smyth	15	15	7					14	14			17	12	19		11
27	(United Kingdom) Mark Cole						9	13†			6	Ret					8
28	(United Kingdom) Ian Stinton	7	Ret	Ret													8
29	(United Kingdom) Gary Eastwood	16	Ret				9	13†	15	17	Ret	15	13	Ret	20		8
30	(Sweden) Jan Persson	19	20	Ret			10	11	Ret	18	12	Ret	20	13	Ret		7
30	(United Kingdom) Rob Barrett	19	20	Ret			10	11	Ret	18	12	Ret	20	13	Ret		7
32	(India) Phiroze Balimoria										7	10					7
33	(Republic of Ireland) Damien Faulkner						Ret	5									6
34	(United Kingdom) Richard Hollebon	18	18	20			11	10	Ret	21	13	14	19	14	Ret		6
34	(United Kingdom) Nick Marsh	18	18	20			11	10	Ret	21	13	14	19	14	Ret		6
35	(United Kingdom) Oliver Morley	DNS	12														3
36	(United Kingdom) Stuart Moseley			10													3
37	(United Kingdom) Phil Quaife	16	Ret	10													3
38	(United Kingdom) Andy Allen	14	14	11													3
39	(United Kingdom) Pete James	14	14	11													3
40	(United Kingdom) Rob Wilson								15	17			13	Ret	20		3
41	(United Kingdom) Barry Horne								Ret	16							2
42	(United Kingdom) Bill Cameron								Ret	16							2
43	(United Kingdom) Andrew Howard										Ret	13	Ret	20	17		2
44	(Republic of Ireland) Matt Griffin												15	Ret	Ret		1
45	(United Kingdom) Terry White										Ret	15					0
46	(United Kingdom) Stephen Keating								18†	DNS	Ret	16	18	Ret	Ret		0
47	(United Kingdom) Jonathan Coleman	17	19														0
48	(United Kingdom) Simon Scuffham			17													0
49	(United Kingdom) Scott Fitzgerald			17													0
50	(United Kingdom) Alistair Davidson								17	20							0
51	(United Kingdom) Chris Wilson								17	20							0
52	(United Kingdom) Mark Powell								18†	DNS					Ret		0
53	(United Kingdom) David Harkness												Ret	20			0
54	(United Kingdom) Bill Tulley												21	21	Ret		0
55	(Italy) Michelangelo Segatori	DNS	DNS										22	16			0
56	(Italy) Marco Piva												22	16			0
NC	(United Kingdom) Simon Pullan			Ret													0
NC	(Italy) Walter Colacino	DNS	DNS														0
Guest driver ineligible for points
NC	(United Kingdom) Tom Ferrier												11	5			0
NC	(United Kingdom) Paul Mace												16	7	18		0
NC	(United Kingdom) Peter Bamford												15	Ret	Ret		0
Pos	Driver	OUL (United Kingdom)		DON (United Kingdom)	PAU (France)		MON (Republic of Ireland)		SNE (United Kingdom)		ROC (United Kingdom)		BRH (United Kingdom)		SIL (United Kingdom)	MAG (France)	Pts

Colour	Result
Gold	Winner
Silver	Second place
Bronze	Third place
Green	Points classification
Blue	Non-points classification
Blue	Non-classified finish (NC)
Purple	Retired, not classified (Ret)
Red	Did not qualify (DNQ)
Red	Did not pre-qualify (DNPQ)
Black	Disqualified (DSQ)
White	Did not start (DNS)
White	Withdrew (WD)
White	Race cancelled (C)
Blank	Did not practice (DNP)
Blank	Did not arrive (DNA)
Blank	Excluded (EX)

† — Drivers did not finish the race, but were classified as they completed over 90% of the race distance.

=== GT3 ===
Pos	Driver	OUL (United Kingdom)	DON (United Kingdom)	PAU (France)		MON (Republic of Ireland)		SNE (United Kingdom)		ROC (United Kingdom)		BRH (United Kingdom)		SIL (United Kingdom)	MAG (France)	Pts
1	(Russia) Leo Machitski		8					5	9	2	4	3	4	7		49
2	(United Kingdom) George MacKintosh		18	19	18	8	9	12	13	10	11	14	6	15		44.5
2	(United Kingdom) Sam Blogg		18	19	18	8	9	12	13	10	11	14	6	15		44.5
4	(United Kingdom) Jonathan Cocker		Ret					9	5	2	4	3	4	7		40
5	(United Kingdom) Barrie Whight		Ret	Ret	9	2	2	Ret	7	11	3			9		33.5
5	(United Kingdom) Gavan Kershaw		Ret	Ret	9	2	2	Ret	7	11	3			9		33.5
7	(United Kingdom) Paul Whight		19	16	Ret			DNS	Ret	8	12			16		21.5
8	(United Kingdom) Aaron Scott							4	4							20
8	(United Kingdom) Stuart Turvey							4	4							20
10	(United Kingdom) Paul Drayson		Ret					9	5			Ret	18	11		20.5
11	(United Kingdom) Danny Watts		14									5	9			15
12	(United Kingdom) Richard Stanton							8	6			6	Ret	Ret		15
13	(United Kingdom) Chris Randell		19	16	Ret			DNS	Ret							13
14	(United Kingdom) Michael Bentwood		Ret					5	9							12
14	(United Kingdom) Rob Barff							8	6							12
16	(United Kingdom) Piers Johnson		8													10
16	(United Kingdom) Matt Harris													3		10
16	(United Kingdom) Piers Masarati													3		10
19	(United Kingdom) Rory Fordyce		14													8
20	(United Kingdom) Martin Stretton											Ret	18	11		7.5
21	(United Kingdom) David Ashburn											5	9			7
22	(United Kingdom) Russell Treasure									8	12					6.5
23	(United Kingdom) Phil Glew													12		4
23	(India) Phiroze Bilimoria													12		4
25	(United Kingdom) Richard Hay											6	Ret	Ret		3
26	(United Kingdom) Mark Fullalove													16		2
NC	(United Kingdom) Tom Alexander		Ret													0
Pos	Driver	OUL (United Kingdom)	DON (United Kingdom)	PAU (France)		MON (Republic of Ireland)		SNE (United Kingdom)		ROC (United Kingdom)		BRH (United Kingdom)		SIL (United Kingdom)	MAG (France)	Pts

Colour	Result
Gold	Winner
Silver	Second place
Bronze	Third place
Green	Points classification
Blue	Non-points classification
Blue	Non-classified finish (NC)
Purple	Retired, not classified (Ret)
Red	Did not qualify (DNQ)
Red	Did not pre-qualify (DNPQ)
Black	Disqualified (DSQ)
White	Did not start (DNS)
White	Withdrew (WD)
White	Race cancelled (C)
Blank	Did not practice (DNP)
Blank	Did not arrive (DNA)
Blank	Excluded (EX)

- Half points awarded where less than 6 cars start (Rounds 4-7, 10-13)

All information sourced from https://web.archive.org/web/20090813160841/http://zeta.britishgt.com/points.php?season=2006&class=GT2&type=driver&event=1 and other areas of this site. NOTE: Championship Standings based on race results, not given standings (they do not appear to correspond)
