= Mark Smith (British racing driver) =

British racing driver

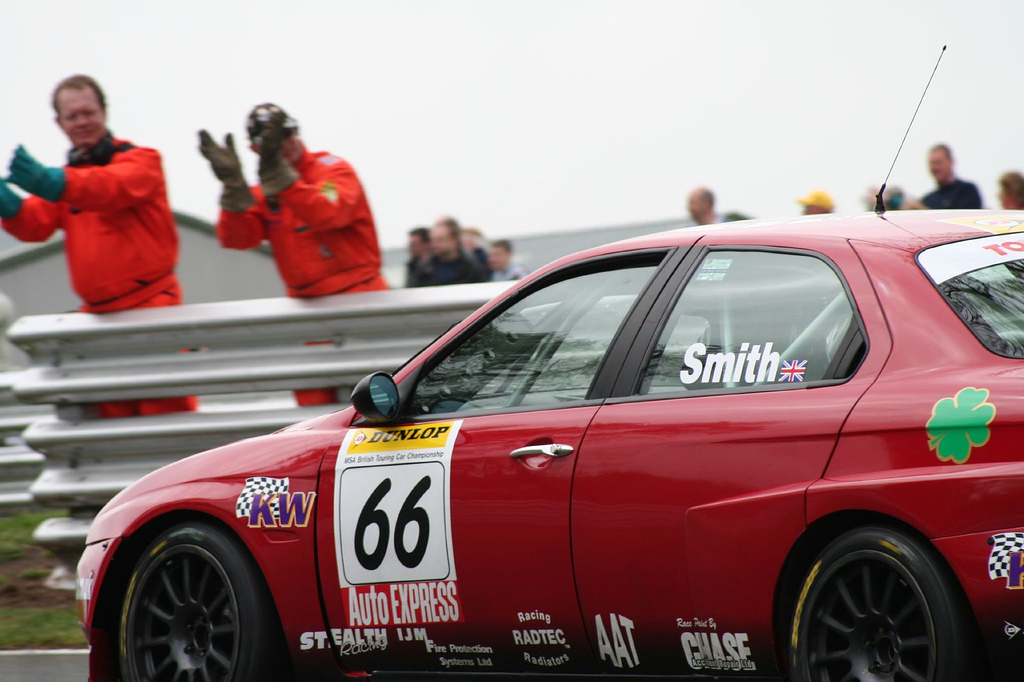
- Nationality: (United Kingdom) British
- Born: Hednesford, Staffordshire

Previous series
- 2006: British Touring Car Championship

Mark Smith (born c. 1965) is a British auto racing driver.

== Career ==
=== Early career ===
Before entering the BTCC, Smith primarily raced in VW cars, first in the Tomcat Vento Challenge (which he won in 2000), and later the VW Racing Cup, in which he was runner-up in 2005.

=== British Touring Car Championship ===
In 2006, Smith competed in the British Touring Car Championship for the family-run In-Front team in an Alfa Romeo 156. Their preparations were hampered pre-season, when a gearbox which was supposed to come ready-to-run was supplied in kit form and not until after the first race weekend. As a result, the team did the first race with an old-fashioned H-pattern box, and skipped round 2 completely. They never scored a top-ten points finish, and did not return in 2007, despite acquiring sponsorship from Jessops and appearing at the Autosport International Show.

== Racing record ==
=== Complete British Touring Car Championship results ===
(key) (Races in bold indicate pole position - 1 point awarded in first race) (Races in italics indicate fastest lap - 1 point awarded all races) (* signifies that driver lead feature race for at least one lap - 1 point awarded all races)

| Year | Team | Car | 1 | 2 | 3 | 4 | 5 | 6 | 7 | 8 | 9 | 10 | 11 | 12 | 13 | 14 | 15 | 16 | 17 | 18 | 19 | 20 | 21 | 22 | 23 | 24 | 25 | 26 | 27 | 28 | 29 | 30 | DC | Pts |
|---|---|---|---|---|---|---|---|---|---|---|---|---|---|---|---|---|---|---|---|---|---|---|---|---|---|---|---|---|---|---|---|---|---|---|
| 2006 | InFront Motorsport | Alfa Romeo 156 | BRH; 1; 11 | BRH; 2 Ret | BRH; 3 DNS | MON; 1 | MON; 2 | MON; 3 | OUL; 1; 16 | OUL; 2; 16 | OUL; 3 Ret | THR; 1 NC | THR; 2; 14 | THR; 3; 14 | CRO; 1; 17 | CRO; 2; 17 | CRO; 3; 18 | DON; 1; 17 | DON; 2; 11 | DON; 3 Ret | SNE; 1 Ret | SNE; 2 Ret | SNE; 3; 16 | KNO; 1 | KNO; 2 | KNO; 3 | BRH; 1; 17 | BRH; 2; 14 | BRH; 3; 14 | SIL; 1; 18 | SIL; 2; 13 | SIL; 3; 13 | 23rd | 0 |
