= Darren Dowling =

British racing driver (born 1968)

- Nationality: (United Kingdom) British
- Born: 22 February 1968 (age 58)

Previous series
- 2006: British Touring Car Championship

Darren Dowling (born 22 February 1968 in Watford) is a British racing driver.

== Career ==
=== British Touring Car Championship ===
Dowling drove the final six rounds of the British Touring Car Championship in 2006. He raced in a Lexus IS200 for the newly formed BTC Racing team alongside team-mate Chris Stockton. His best ever finish was a fourteenth position at Silverstone, ending the season with no points. The team continued in 2007, but he was replaced by Nick Leason.

== Racing record ==
=== Complete British Touring Car Championship results ===
(key) (Races in bold indicate pole position - 1 point awarded in first race) (Races in italics indicate fastest lap - 1 point awarded all races) (* signifies that driver lead race for at least one lap - 1 point awarded all races)

Year	Team	Car	1	2	3	4	5	6	7	8	9	10	11	12	13	14	15	16	17	18	19	20	21	22	23	24	25	26	27	28	29	30	DC	Pts
2006	BTC Racing	Lexus IS200	BRH; 1	BRH; 2	BRH; 3	MON; 1	MON; 2	MON; 3	OUL; 1	OUL; 2	OUL; 3	THR; 1	THR; 2	THR; 3	CRO; 1	CRO; 2	CRO; 3	DON; 1	DON; 2	DON; 3	SNE; 1	SNE; 2	SNE; 3	KNO; 1	KNO; 2	KNO; 3	BRH; 1; 16	BRH; 2 Ret	BRH; 3; 15	SIL; 1; 20	SIL; 2; 14	SIL; 3 Ret	**27th**	**0**

=== 24 Hours of Silverstone results ===
Year	Team	Co-Drivers	Car	Car No.	Class	Laps	Pos.	Class Pos.
2010	(United Kingdom) GTF-MCC	(United Kingdom) Fred Tonge (United Kingdom) Sam Head (United Kingdom) Tim Hood (United Kingdom) Steve Glynn	TVR Sagaris	7	1	369	49th	5th
2011	(United Kingdom) GTF Racing	(United Kingdom) Fred Tonge (United Kingdom) Steve Glynn (United Kingdom) David Mason (United Kingdom) Paul Smith	TVR Sagaris	28	2	71	DNF	DNF

=== Post-BTCC ===
Recently, Dowling has driven in the BRSCC Sports and Saloon Car Trophy in a TVR Sagaris.
