= Adam Jones (racing driver) =

British racing driver (born 1980)

- Nationality: (United Kingdom) British
- Born: Adam Scott Jones; 9 August 1980 (age 46) Birmingham, England

British Touring Car Championship career
- Debut season: 2006
- Current team: Clyde Valley Racing
- Car number: 9
- Former teams: Team Aircool; Xero Competition
- Starts: 90
- Wins: 0
- Poles: 0
- Fastest laps: 0
- Best finish: 9th in 2008

Previous series
- 2007–08 2001–04 2002 2000–01 1999: British GT; FIA GT; British F3; French F3; Formula Renault Campus

Championship titles
- 1999: Formula Renault Campus

Adam Scott Jones (born 9 August 1980, in Birmingham) is a British racing driver.

== Early career ==
Jones competed successfully in Formula 3 and Formula Renault in France, before switching to GT racing. Three years of irregular drives in both the FIA and British GT championships where followed by a stint in the Le Mans Endurance series alongside Sascha Maassen, winning his class at the Nürburgring. In 2005, he raced historic cars as well as the Britcar 24-hour race at Silverstone, in which he finished third alongside Tim Harvey.

== Touring Cars ==
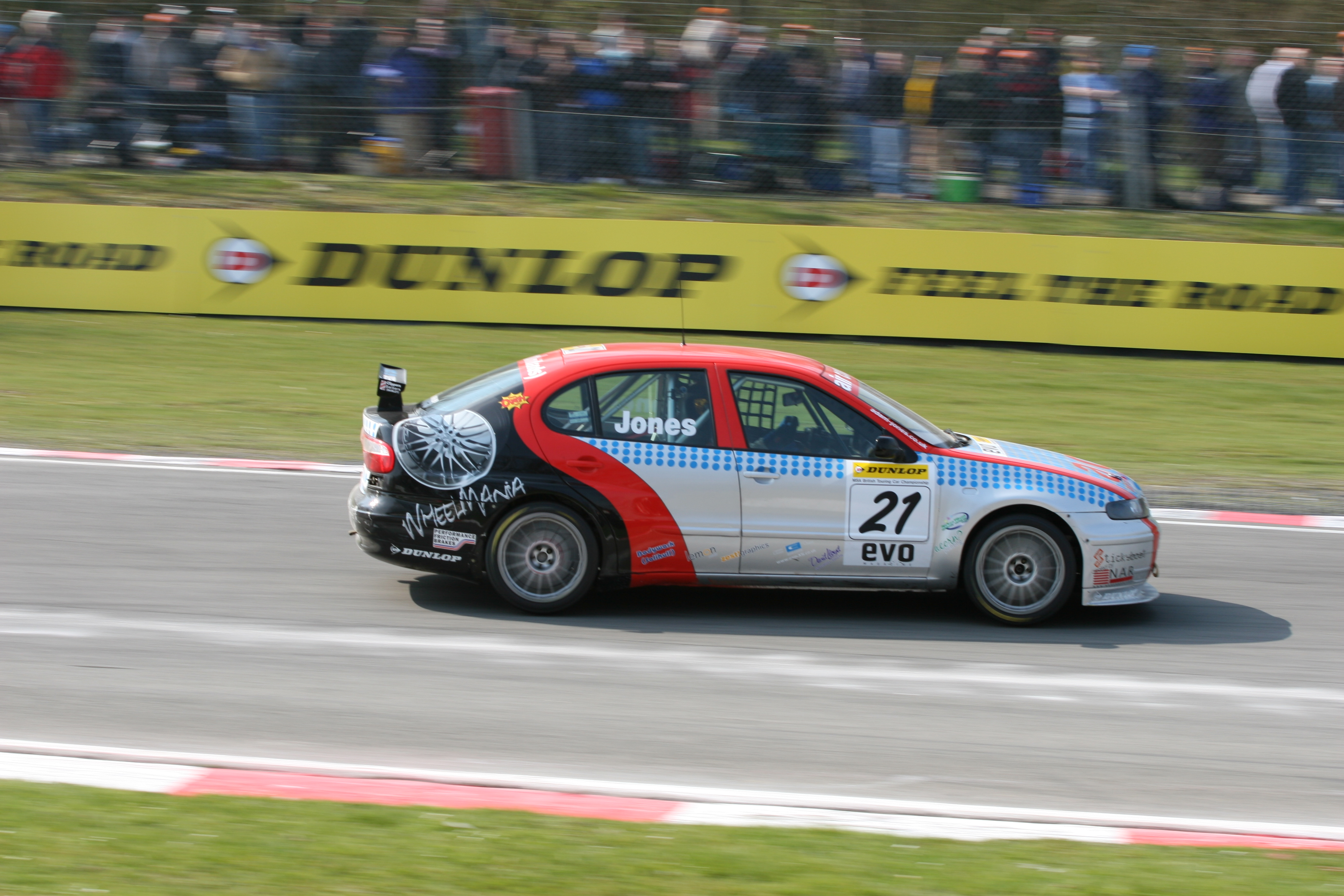
Jones driving the GR Asia SEAT Toledo at Brands Hatch during the 2007 British Touring Car Championship season.

Jones moved to the British Touring Car Championship for 2006 driving a Lexus IS200 for Xero Competition. His only point came in round 6 of the season at Donington Park.

Jones contested seven meetings of the 2007 British Touring Car Championship season in a SEAT Toledo Cupra prepared by GR Asia, in the car also used by Tom Coronel in the World Touring Car Championship. He was competitive in the first round but missed the next three meetings, before being among the frontrunners in round 5. In round 6 at Donington Park, he qualified seventh, before charging through the field in the first race to finish second for his first BTCC podium , and the first ever for a non-works SEAT. At Brands Hatch, the team also ran Gavin Smith in a newer SEAT León, but Jones had the better of him, finishing seventh race one before running second in race two. Contact with Colin Turkington dropped him to sixth, but the reverse grid gave him pole for race 3. He made a poor start before a long-running battle with Tom Onslow-Cole, which ended in a big collision eliminating Jones.

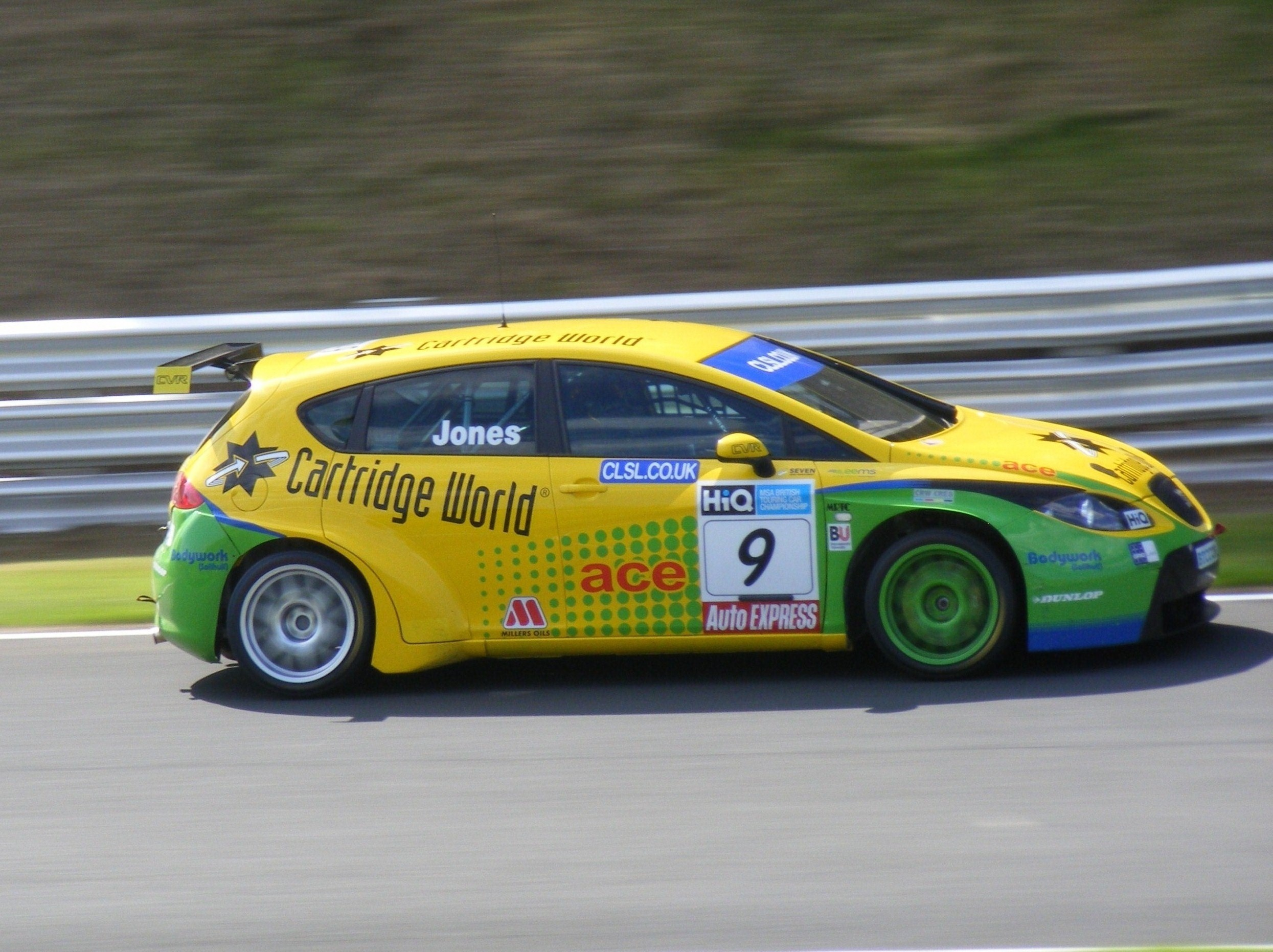
Jones driving the Clyde Valley Racing SEAT León at Oulton Park during the 2009 British Touring Car Championship season.

The team ran a SEAT León full-time in 2008 and Jones took a third and a fourth in round 2 at Rockingham, and another podium in round 5 at Croft. In the Independents Trophy he has been among the first three finishers in 11 of those 15 races, giving him the class lead – aided by many races having intermediate wet-dry conditions which did not suit the BMWs of his leading rivals Turkington and Mat Jackson. His season ended with a lucky escape at Brands Hatch, as his car speared off the track at Clearways, narrowly missing armco posts which had been bent by a huge crash involving John George earlier in the race. There is every chance that the car could have been launched onto the marshal's post or even into the crowd had he struck these. He ultimately finished 3rd in the class and ninth overall. He also competed in three rounds of the British GT Championship in a Team Modena Lamborghini Gallardo LP560 GT3.

For 2009, Jones moved to the all-new Clyde Valley Racing team, alongside the returning Dan Eaves and continued to drive a León. The team failed to complete the season due to lack of funds.

For 2010, Jones competed in the European Abarth Trofeo Championship as a privateer finishing second overall missing out by just a couple of points.

In 2011, Jones competed in the Britcar 24hr in a Seat Leon Supa Copa & also competing in the championship for 2012 gaining three pole positions & two wins with car owner & team mate Craig Davies.

His next race is the Historic Spa 6hrs competing in a Corvette again with car owner Craig Davies.

Since 2023, Jones has been a part of the Stories From SuperTouring podcast series, giving his expert opinion on the discussion of past races during the Super Touring era of touring car racing.

== Racing record ==
=== Complete British Touring Car Championship results ===
(key) (Races in bold indicate pole position – 1 point awarded just in first race) (Races in italics indicate fastest lap – 1 point awarded all races) (* signifies that driver lead race for at least one lap – 1 point awarded all races)

Year	Team	Car	1	2	3	4	5	6	7	8	9	10	11	12	13	14	15	16	17	18	19	20	21	22	23	24	25	26	27	28	29	30	DC	Pts
2006	Xero Competition	Lexus IS200	BRH; 1	BRH; 2	BRH; 3	MON; 1	MON; 2	MON; 3	OUL; 1 Ret	OUL; 2; 15	OUL; 3; 12	THR; 1; 11	THR; 2; 11	THR; 3; 13	CRO; 1; 13	CRO; 2; 13	CRO; 3; 13	DON; 1; 16	DON; 2; 10	DON; 3 Ret	SNE; 1	SNE; 2	SNE; 3	KNO; 1; 11	KNO; 2 Ret	KNO; 3 DNS	BRH; 1; 12	BRH; 2 Ret	BRH; 3; 12	SIL; 1 DNS	SIL; 2 DNS	SIL; 3 DNS	22nd	1
2007	Team Air Cool	SEAT Toledo Cupra	BRH; 1; 7	BRH; 2; 6	BRH; 3; 5	ROC; 1 DNS	ROC; 2 DNS	ROC; 3 DNS	THR; 1	THR; 2	THR; 3	CRO; 1	CRO; 2	CRO; 3	OUL; 1 Ret	OUL; 2; 8	**OUL**; **3**; 5	DON; 1; 2	DON; 2; 5	DON; 3 Ret	SNE; 1	SNE; 2	SNE; 3	BRH; 1; 7	BRH; 2; 6	**BRH**; **3** Ret	KNO; 1; 4	KNO; 2; 7	KNO; 3; 8	THR; 1; 9	THR; 2; 12	THR; 3; 7	11th	72
2008	Team Air Cool	SEAT León	BRH; 1; 10	BRH; 2; 10	BRH; 3; 18	ROC; 1; 4	ROC; 2; 8	**ROC**; **3**; 3	DON; 1; 7	DON; 2; 7	DON; 3; 7	THR; 1; 8	THR; 2; 6	THR; 3; 5	CRO; 1; 8	CRO; 2; 6	CRO; 3; 2	SNE; 1; 13	SNE; 2; 10	SNE; 3 DSQ	OUL; 1; 8	OUL; 2; 6	OUL; 3; 2	KNO; 1; 8	KNO; 2; 12	KNO; 3; 10	SIL; 1; 8	SIL; 2; 3	SIL; 3; 2	BRH; 1; 11	BRH; 2; 11	BRH; 3 Ret	9th	119
2009	Cartridge World Carbon Zero Racing	SEAT León	BRH; 1; 5	BRH; 2; 7	BRH; 3; 7	THR; 1; 6	THR; 2; 8	THR; 3; 2	DON; 1; 9	DON; 2; 8	DON; 3 Ret	OUL; 1; 6	OUL; 2; 8	OUL; 3; 7	CRO; 1; 16	CRO; 2; 8	CRO; 3 Ret	SNE; 1; 7	SNE; 2; 11	SNE; 3; 7	KNO; 1	KNO; 2	KNO; 3	SIL; 1	SIL; 2	SIL; 3	ROC; 1	ROC; 2	ROC; 3	BRH; 1	BRH; 2	BRH; 3	11th	62

=== Complete British GT results ===
(key) (Races in bold indicate pole position) (Races in italics indicate fastest lap)

Year	Team	Car	Class	1	2	3	4	5	6	7	8	9	10	11	12	13	14	15	16	DC	Pts
2006	Cirtek Motorsport	Porsche 997 GT2-RS	GT2	OUL; 1	OUL; 2	DON	PAU; 1	PAU; 2	MON; 1	MON; 2	SNE; 1	SNE; 2	ROC; 1	ROC; 2	BRH; 1 Ret	BRH; 2; 2	SIL	MAG; 1	MAG; 2	16th	4
2007	Team Modena	Lamborghini Gallardo LP560 GT3	GT3	OUL; 1	OUL; 2	DON; 1	DON; 2	SNE; 4	BRH; 1	BRH; 2	SIL; 8	THR; 1 Ret	THR; 2 DNS	CRO; 1	CRO; 2	**ROC**; **1**; 3	ROC; 2 DNS			14th	12
2008	Team Modena	Lamborghini Gallardo LP560 GT3	GT3	OUL; 1 DNS	OUL; 2 DNS	KNO; 1	KNO; 2	ROC; 1; 2	ROC; 2; 9	SNE; 1; 8	SNE; 2 Ret	THR; 1; 4	THR; 2 DNS	BRH; 1	BRH; 2	DON	SIL; DNS			27th	14

Sporting positions
Preceded by Westley Barber	Formula Campus Champion; 1999	Succeeded by Stéphane Morat
