= David Pinkney =

British racing driver (born 1952)

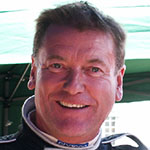
- Nationality: (United Kingdom) British
- Born: 5 July 1952 (age 74) Bridlington, East Riding of Yorkshire, England

British Touring Car Championship
- Years active: 1989, 1993, 2001, 2006–2007, 2009–2011
- Teams: Terry Drury Racing; Pinkney Motorsport; JS Motorsport; Motorbase Performance; A-Tech; Team Dynamics; Rob Austin Racing
- Starts: 134
- Wins: 0
- Poles: 0
- Fastest laps: 1
- Best finish: 13th in 2001, 2006

Championship titles
- 1999: Vauxhall Vectra SRi V6 Challenge

David Lee Pinkney is a British businessman and auto racing driver. He competed in the British Touring Car Championship on and off between 1989 and 2011.

== Racing career ==
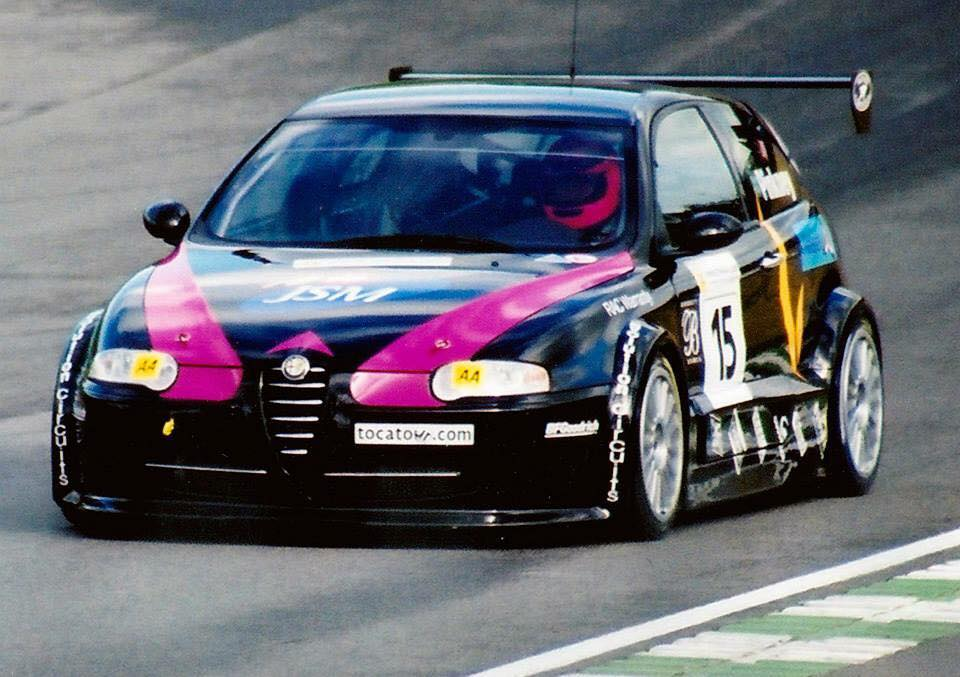
Pinkney driving the JS Motorsport Alfa Romeo 147 during the 2001 British Touring Car Championship season.

James Weaver talked Pinkney into racing and he started out in the Uniroyal Saloon Car Championship in 1987 with a £5000 Rover Vitess SD1 racing against the new Sierra Cosworths- in 1988 he raced a Cosworth Sierra in the production saloon championship- then moved on to the BTCC in 1989 with a troubled RS500 prepared by Terry Drury, then three more years in a Cosworth Saphire - Moving back to the BTCC in a Prodrive BMW in 1993. He also briefly raced in the BTCC series with Tim Harvey in 2001 in a rather unreliable Alfa Romeo 147, leaving the JSM team after four rounds and four breakdowns.

Pinkney has won the VW Vento VR6 Championships in 1996 & 97 - The Vauxhall Vectra winter series and the Vauxhall Vectra SRi Championship in 1998 and 1999. He also raced on and off in the Porsche Carrera Cup in 2003, 2004 and once in 2005, and the Seat Cupra Championship in 2005.

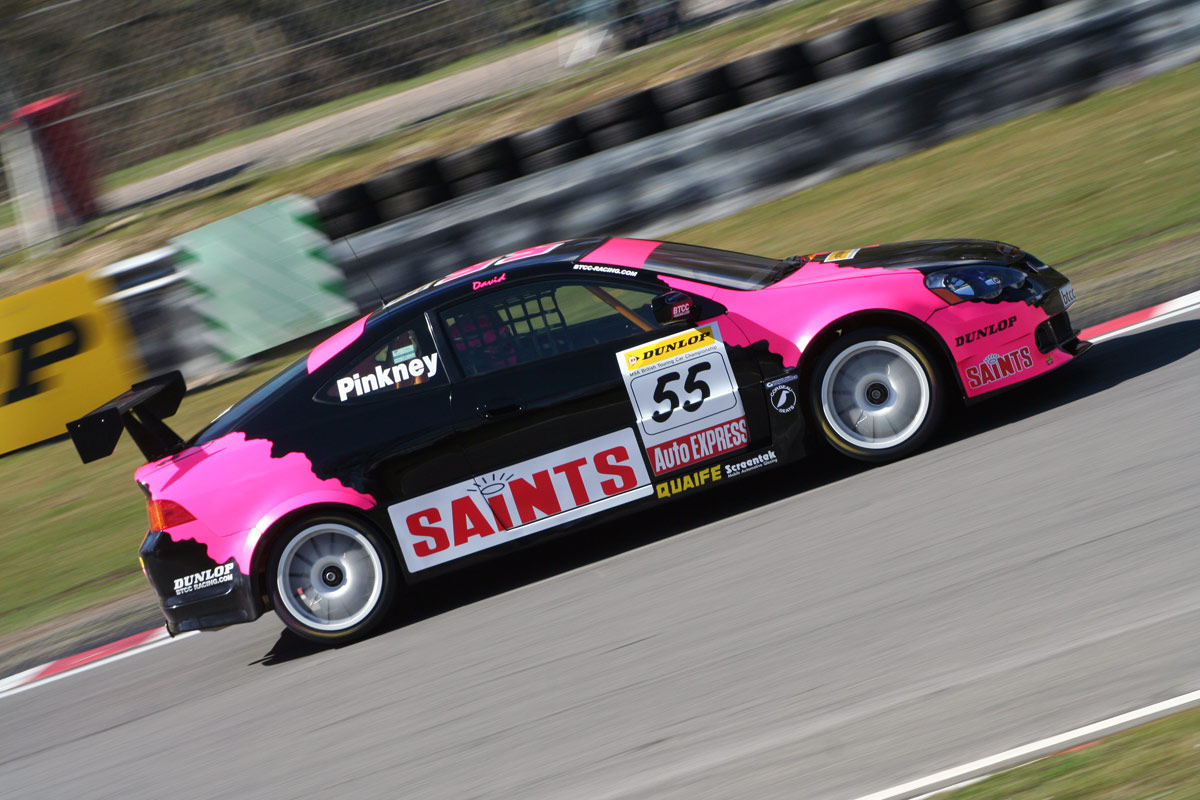
Pinkney's black-and-pink Honda Integra at the Brands Hatch round of the 2006 British Touring Car Championship.

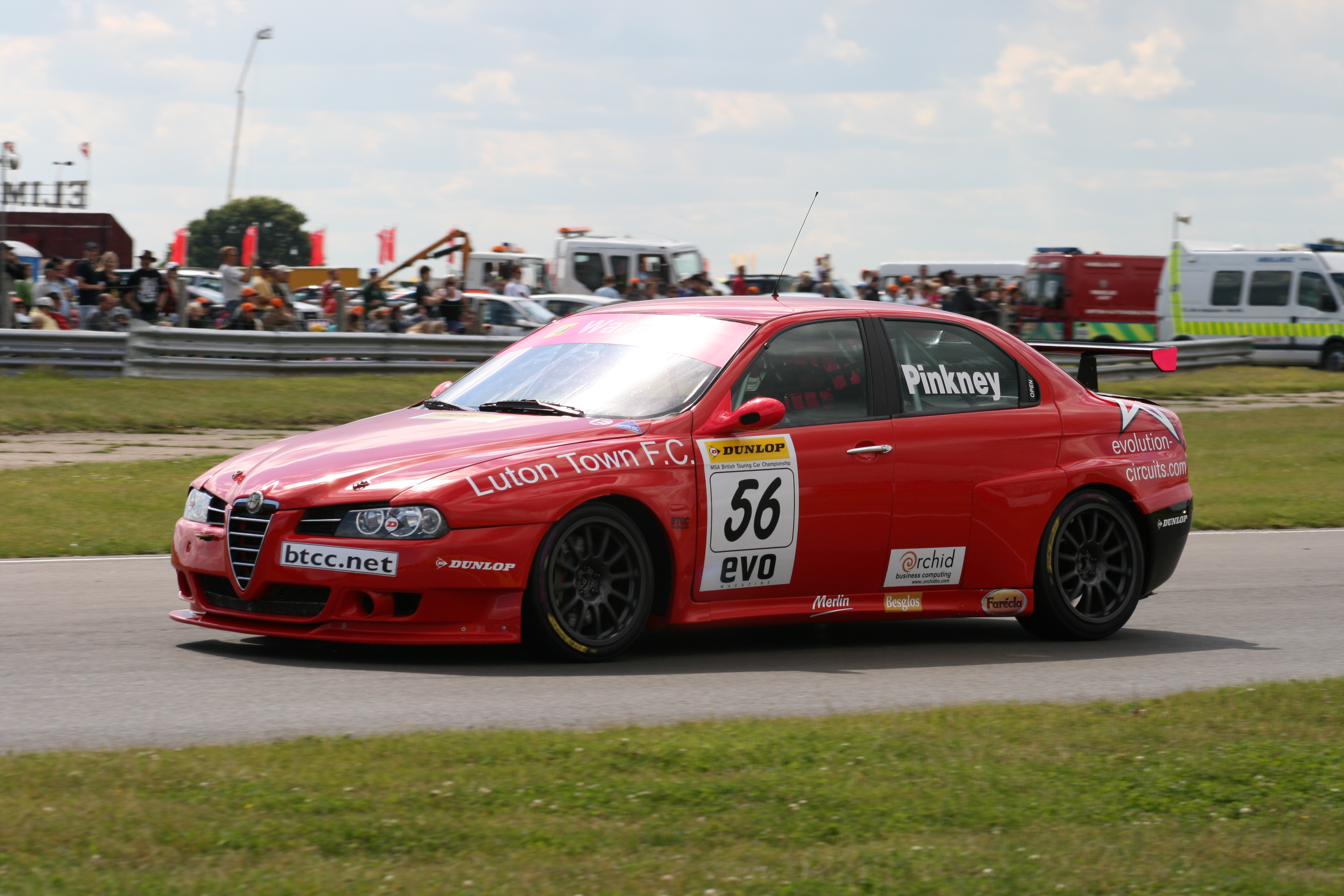
Pinkney driving the A-Tech-run Alfa Romeo 156 during the Snetterton round of the 2007 British Touring Car Championship season.

In 2006, Pinkney raced in the British Touring Car Championship (BTCC) in one of the 2005 championship-winning Honda Integra cars. David was very competitive against the new 2006 cars - He took a pair of top-five finishes at Thruxton in rounds 11 and 12, and also a podium in race three at Knockhill. For 2007, he drove an N.Technology built Alfa 156 run by the newly established A-Tech team, unfortunately the Alfa wouldn't work on dunlops.

After competing in two rounds of the British GT Championship in 2008, Pinkney returned to the BTCC in 2009, driving competitively for Team Dynamics in a Honda Civic TypeR with three different team-mates – Gordon Shedden at the first round, former F1 Formula One race-winner Johnny Herbert in three rounds, and double series champion James Thompson in the other rounds.

In 2010, Pinkney drove a BTCC Triple Eight Vauxhall Vectra with the new Swindon Turbo engine - He opened the season with his first ever triple top-ten finish, with eighth in race one and two tenth places. He was quickest at Brands throughout in the second meeting but was unfortunately power compromised for the rest of the season, which ended his competitive racing career.

In 2011, Pinkney entered the BTCC with Rob Austin Racing driving their new NGTC-spec Audi A4. Pinkney failed to make the start at the first meeting at Brands Hatch and subsequently left the team.

== Luton Town Football Club ==
On 13 April 2007, Pinkney bought Luton Town Football Club. The club tried to secure planning permission for a 50.000 seater stadium at Junction 12 on the M1. In 2008, Pinkney moved on following the decision of the FA to charge the football club in relation to a number of financial irregularities.

== Racing record ==
=== Complete British Touring Car Championship results ===
(key) Races in bold indicate pole position (1 point awarded - 2001 all races, 2006–present just in first race) Races in italics indicate fastest lap (1 point awarded - 2001–present all races) * signifies that driver lead race for at least one lap (1 point given - 2001 just in feature race, 2006–present all races)

Year	Team	Car	Class	1	2	3	4	5	6	7	8	9	10	11	12	13	14	15	16	17	18	19	20	21	22	23	24	25	26	27	28	29	30	Overall DC	Pts	Class
1989	Terry Drury Racing	Ford Sierra RS500	A	OUL; DNQ	SIL; Ret	THR ovr:23 cls:11	DON; Ret	THR ovr:11 cls:10	SIL; Ret	SIL ovr:16 cls:14	BRH	SNE	BRH; Ret	BIR	DON	SIL																		60th	0	27th
1993	Pinkney Motorsport	BMW 318is		SIL; Ret	DON; 13	SNE; 14	DON; Ret	OUL; 13	BRH; 1 Ret	BRH; 2 Ret	PEM; 16	SIL; 15	KNO; 1	KNO; 2	OUL	BRH; 19	THR	DON; 1	DON; 2	SIL														30th	0	
2001	JS Motorsport	Alfa Romeo 147	T	BRH; 1 Ret†	BRH; 2 Ret	THR; 1 ovr:12 cls:5	THR; 2 Ret	OUL; 1 Ret	OUL; 2 DNS	SIL; 1 ovr:19 cls:8	SIL; 2 ovr:7 cls:7	MON; 1	MON; 2	DON; 1	DON; 2	KNO; 1	KNO; 2	SNE; 1	SNE; 2	CRO; 1	CRO; 2	OUL; 1	OUL; 2	SIL; 1	SIL; 2	DON; 1	DON; 2	BRH; 1	BRH; 2					13th	14	
2006	Motorbase Performance	Honda Integra Type-R		BRH; 1 Ret	BRH; 2; 10	BRH; 3; 8	MON; 1; 13	MON; 2; 4	MON; 3; 10	OUL; 1; 10	OUL; 2; 8	OUL; 3 Ret	THR; 1 Ret	THR; 2; 4	THR; 3; 5	CRO; 1; 7	CRO; 2; 9	CRO; 3 Ret	DON; 1; 11	DON; 2 Ret	DON; 3; 9	SNE; 1; 12	SNE; 2 Ret	SNE; 3; 11	KNO; 1 Ret	KNO; 2; 3	KNO; 3; 9	BRH; 1; 9	BRH; 2; 9	BRH; 3 Ret	SIL; 1; 13	SIL; 2; 11	SIL; 3; 12	13th	56	
2007	A-Tech	Alfa Romeo 156		BRH; 1; 20	BRH; 2 Ret	BRH; 3; 13	ROC; 1; 13	ROC; 2; 8	ROC; 3; 12	THR; 1; 15	THR; 2; 10	**THR**; **3**; 13*	CRO; 1 Ret	CRO; 2 Ret	CRO; 3; 12	OUL; 1 Ret	OUL; 2 Ret	OUL; 3 DNS	DON; 1; 16	DON; 2; 16	DON; 3; 14	SNE; 1 Ret	SNE; 2 Ret	SNE; 3 Ret	BRH; 1 Ret	BRH; 2 DNS	BRH; 3 DNS	KNO; 1	KNO; 2	KNO; 3	THR; 1 Ret	THR; 2 Ret	THR; 3; 15	20th	5	
2009	Team Dynamics	Honda Civic		BRH; 1; 15	BRH; 2; 13	BRH; 3 Ret	THR; 1; 14	THR; 2; 13	THR; 3; 10	DON; 1; 14	DON; 2; 12	DON; 3; 10	OUL; 1; 15	OUL; 2; 11	OUL; 3 Ret	CRO; 1; 10	CRO; 2; 11	CRO; 3 Ret	SNE; 1; 8	SNE; 2 Ret	SNE; 3; 9	KNO; 1 Ret	KNO; 2 Ret	KNO; 3; 12	SIL; 1 Ret	SIL; 2; 16	SIL; 3; 10	ROC; 1; 15	ROC; 2; 13	ROC; 3 Ret	BRH; 1; 15	BRH; 2; 14	BRH; 3; 10	18th	10	
2010	Pinkney Motorsport	Vauxhall Vectra		THR; 1; 8	THR; 2; 10	THR; 3; 10	ROC; 1; 18	ROC; 2; 16	ROC; 3 Ret	BRH; 1 Ret	BRH; 2; 8	BRH; 3 Ret	OUL; 1 Ret	OUL; 2; 10	OUL; 3; 11	CRO; 1 Ret	CRO; 2 DNS	CRO; 3 Ret	SNE; 1 Ret	SNE; 2; 11	SNE; 3; 9	SIL; 1 Ret	SIL; 2 Ret	SIL; 3; 11	KNO; 1; 11	KNO; 2 Ret	KNO; 3 Ret	DON; 1; 10	DON; 2; 18	DON; 3; 13	BRH; 1 DNS	BRH; 2 DNS	BRH; 3 DNS	15th	12	
2011	Rob Austin Racing	Audi A4		BRH; 1 DNS	BRH; 2 DNS	BRH; 3 DNS	DON; 1	DON; 2	DON; 3	THR; 1	THR; 2	THR; 3	OUL; 1	OUL; 2	OUL; 3	CRO; 1	CRO; 2	CRO; 3	SNE; 1	SNE; 2	SNE; 3	KNO; 1	KNO; 2	KNO; 3	ROC; 1	ROC; 2	ROC; 3	BRH; 1	BRH; 2	BRH; 3	SIL; 1	SIL; 2	SIL; 3	NC	0	

† Event with 2 races staged for the different classes.

=== Complete Deutsche Tourenwagen Meisterschaft results ===
(key) (Races in bold indicate pole position) (Races in italics indicate fastest lap)

Year	Team	Car	1	2	3	4	5	6	7	8	9	10	11	12	13	14	15	16	17	18	19	20	21	22	DC	Pts
1993	Pinkney Motorsport	BMW 318is	ZOL; 1	ZOL; 2	HOC; 1	HOC; 2	NÜR; 1	NÜR; 2	WUN; 1	WUN; 2	NÜR; 1	NÜR; 2	NOR; 1	NOR; 2	DON; 1 NC	DON; 2; 21	DIE; 1	DIE; 2	SIN; 1	SIN; 2	AVU; 1	AVU; 2	HOC; 1	HOC; 2	NC†	0†

† Not classified in championship due to only entering in the non-championship event.

=== Complete Porsche Supercup results ===
(key) (Races in bold indicate pole position) (Races in italics indicate fastest lap)

Year	Team	Car	1	2	3	4	5	6	7	8	9	10	11	12	DC	Points
2003	Porsche Cars Great Britain	Porsche 996 GT3	ITA1	ESP	AUT	MON	GER1	FRA	GBR; 17	GER2	HUN	ITA2	USA1	USA2	NC‡	0‡

‡ – Guest driver – Not eligible for points.
