= Keith Ahlers =

British race car driver

Keith Norman Ahlers (born 13 August 1955) is a British race car driver. He was born in Cambridge, England, and was educated at the Perse School for Boys, Cambridge.

Ahlers is associated with Morgan Motor Company, driving a privately owned car (not the Morgan Aero 8 as in the 2004 24 Hours of Le Mans) in the 24 Hours Nürburgring each year.

In 2004, Ahlers drove one race of the American Le Mans Series. He is frequenting the New Forest Morgan sports car club. He is also one of the drivers featured in the video game TOCA Race Driver 3.

More recently, Ahlers won the FiA Historic Sports Car Championship in 2016, 2017 & 2018 in a Cooper Monaco King Cobra.
