= Xero Competition =

Xero Competition was an auto racing team based in Great Britain. They operated from premises in Warrington, in the North-West of England. They competed in the 2006 MSA Dunlop British Touring Car Championship.

== Previous seasons ==
Xero Competition have been represented in a number of national British motorsport championships before graduating to the BTCC in 2006. They entered Chevrolet Corvette's in the N-GT Class of British GT Championship and achieved respectable success in 2003 and 2004, including podium finishes with both the Xero Corvette and the Xero-run Embassy Racing Corvette. In 2005 they achieved early success but withdrew after the opening rounds due to financial problems. They have however continued to run the "yellow" Corvette in Belcar and Rhino's GT series as well as running the ex-Embassy car in the FFSA GT Championship.

== 2006 season ==
Adam Jones

During fall 2005, Xero purchased two Lexus IS200 cars that had previously been raced in Production form in the Dutch Touring Car Championship. The program was suspended in spring 2006, as the team had failed to secure sufficient backing to allow them to compete in the series. However, in the weeks following the opening rounds at Brands Hatch, the team agreed a deal with Adam Jones, with sponsorship from engineering firm Air Cool Engineering.

The team made their debut in round three at Oulton Park, and although they have had a number of problems with the car, they scored their first ever BTCC points at Donington Park (on 30 July), where Adam Jones finished in 10th place in race 2. The team temporarily withdrew from the series to concentrate on development work on the Lexus after Donington Park, returning at Knockhill on the first weekend of September.

Xero Competition have also fielded cars in Radical series, and have continued to do so alongside the British Touring Car programme. Where Junior Ginetta champion Toby Newton achieved several podium finishes in the Radical championship and the "Radical World Cup" supporting the LMES round at Donington Park and also at Spa Francorchamps in Belgium, Toby finished 4th overall in the 2006 championship.
