= Dan Eaves =

British racing driver (born 1975)

- Nationality: (United Kingdom) British
- Born: Daniel John Eaves; 3 June 1975 (age 51) Evesham, England

British Touring Car Championship
- Years active: 2000–2005, 2009
- Teams: Team Cartridge World Carbon Zero Racing; Team Dynamics; Vic Lee Racing; Bowman Motorsport
- Starts: 145
- Wins: 6
- Poles: 1
- Fastest laps: 7
- Best finish: 3rd in 2005

Previous series
- 1999–2000: National Saloon Cup

Daniel John Eaves (born 3 June 1975 in Worcestershire) is a British auto racing driver. He competed in the British Touring Car Championship between 2000 and 2005, and again in 2009, winning a total of six races (including a triple-race clean sweep at Thruxton in 2005) and claimed a best finish of third place in the drivers' championship in 2005.

== Career ==
Eaves started racing karts in 1990 before switching to the Halfords MG Midget Challenge in 1994, finishing third. In 1995, he came second in the Caterham K Series Championship. In 1998, he won the Renault Spider Cup and earned a test with the Williams touring car team and the nickname Spiderman because of his dominance in the series.

Eaves raced in the National Saloon Cup in 1999 and 2000, finishing fourth in the series both times with a Bowman Motorsport Peugeot 306. In 2000, the British Touring Car Championship ran a Class B for these cars, and Bowman Motorsport under the name of Touring Car VIP Club had Eaves entered two rounds in his 306. When Vic Lee took over the team, renaming Vic Lee Racing, Eaves was retained to drive in a new factory Peugeot entry for the 2001 BTCC, in a Peugeot 406 coupe.

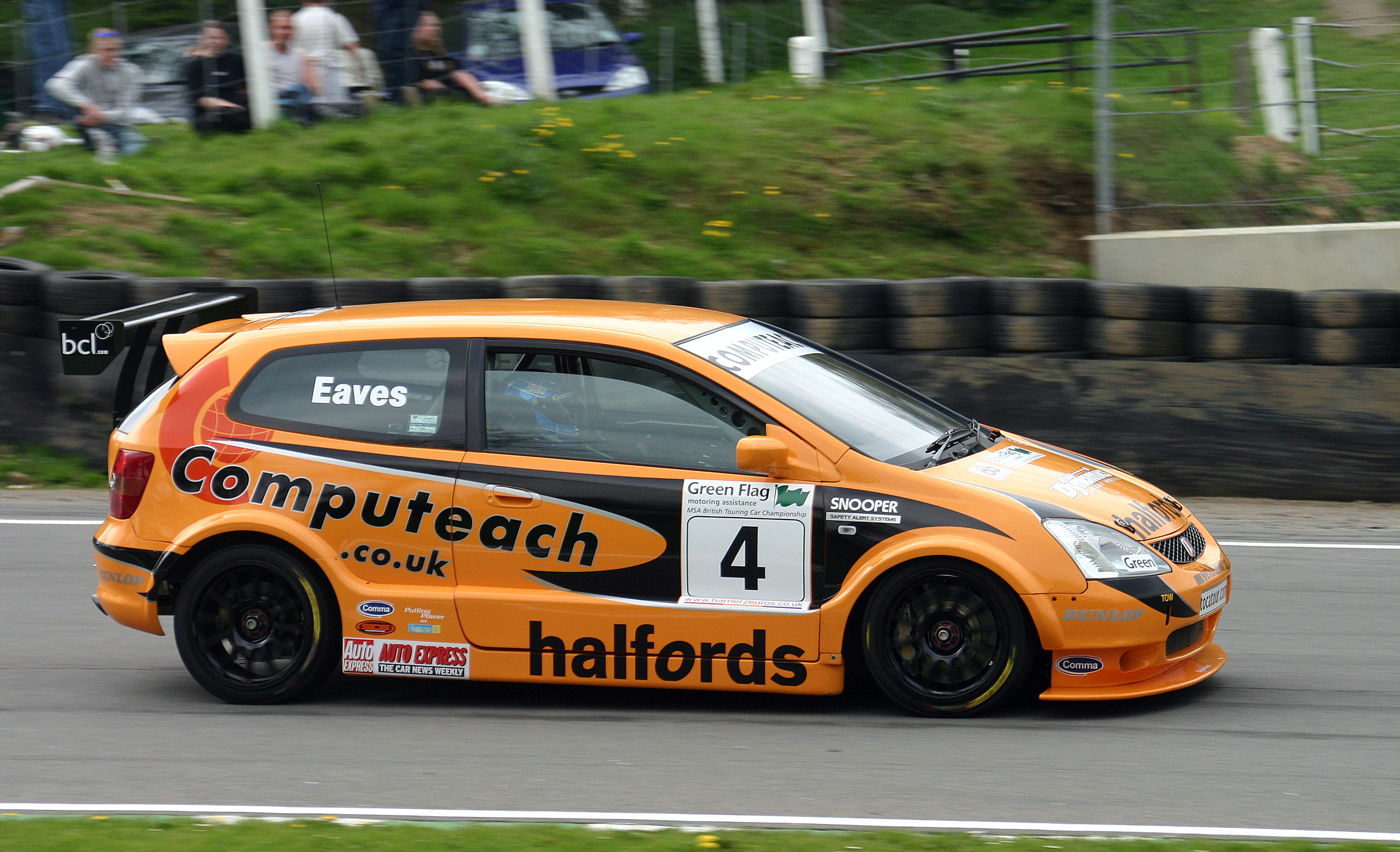
Eaves driving the Team Dynamics Honda Civic at Brands Hatch during the 2004 British Touring Car Championship season.

This was a transitional year for the championship, and Eaves finished fifth out of a fairly thin field, although he beat veteran team-mate Steve Soper. For 2002, Peugeot pulled out but the team remained, with Halfords backing and now with Independent status. Eaves won Indy honours ahead of former Superbike racer Aaron Slight, and team-mate Tim Harvey. For 2003, his team-mate was Carl Breeze and later Danny Buxton, this time in a VLR-built 307, and after a slow start he was Independent class winner several times. The team pulled out before 2004, but Eaves was given a drive with Team Dynamics in a Honda Civic. He was eighth in the standings that year, taking his first ever championship win.

In 2005, Eaves continued with Team Dynamics (which was entered as Team Halfords in reference to their main sponsor) racing a Honda Integra. He recorded five wins, including 3 at Thruxton – the first time that one driver had ever won three BTCC races in one meeting. He also won the final race at the Croft circuit in Yorkshire.

Eaves ended the season third in the championship after the fight to take second place in the championship went down to the last race at Brands Hatch. Eaves was in a three-way fight on point with Yvan Muller and Jason Plato. It ended when he was caught up in a controversial crash caused by a rear end shove from Yvan Muller going into turn 1 that also collected Jason Plato. Muller retained second place in the championship on Points and Eaves finished in third place in the Championship, only four points behind the Frenchman.

At the end of the 2005 season, it seemed a certainty that Eaves would be retained by his team due to his recognised support and wingman to help Matt Neal take the driver title (team orders advantaged Neal), but in February 2006, a disagreement with team owner Steve Neal resulted in Team Dynamics replacing him with Gordon Shedden for the 2006 season.

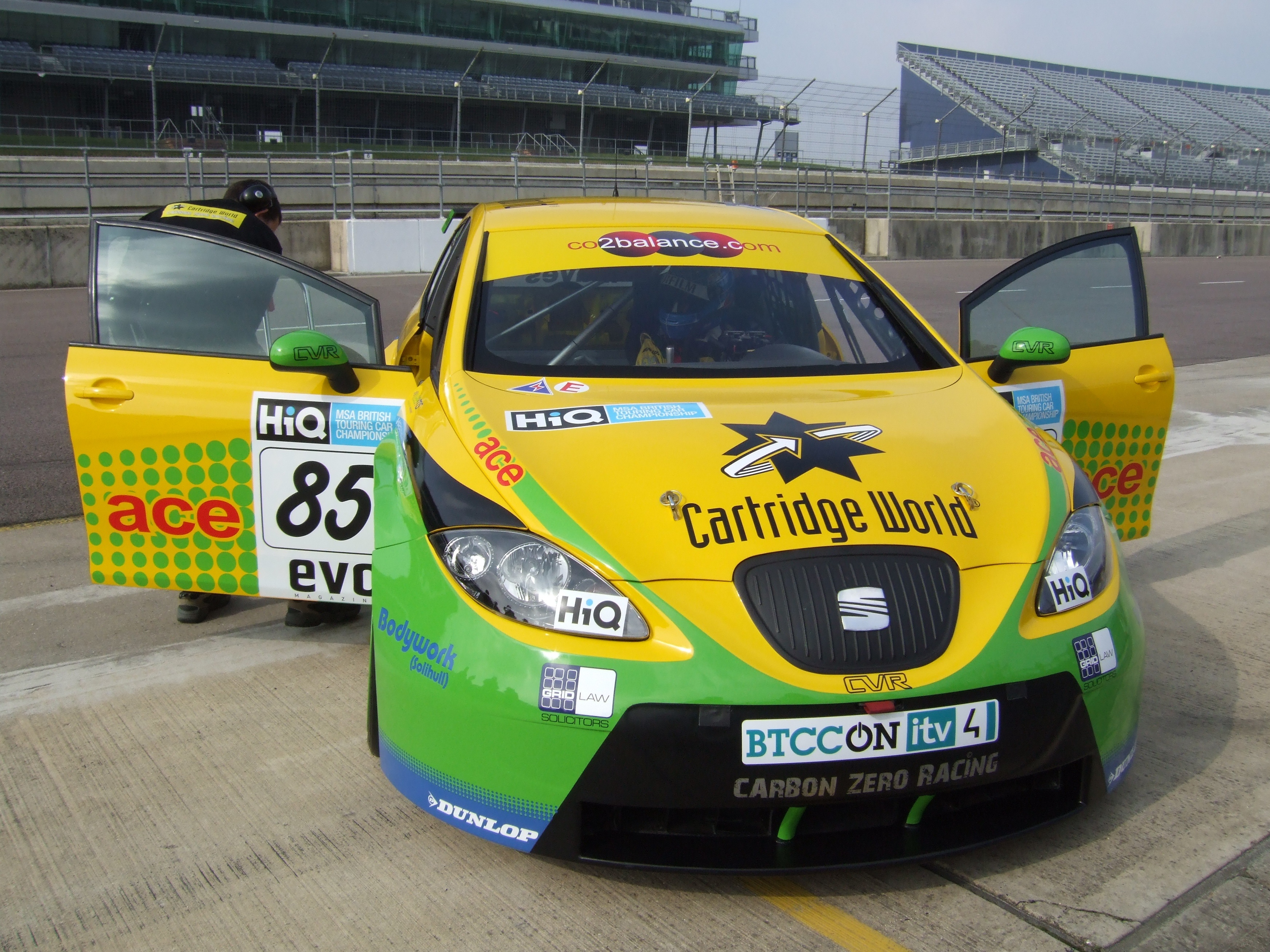
Eaves' SEAT at the 2009 BTCC Media Day at Rockingham

Eaves was poised to join Team Clyde Valley Racing in the 2007 BTCC season, when the team were tipped to enter a pair of bio-ethanol Chevrolet Lacettis. However, the team did not appear in that year or in 2008 after a sponsor pulled out. The team entered in 2009 giving Eaves his return to the BTCC alongside Adam Jones in a pair of bio-ethanol fuelled SEAT Leons under the banner of Cartridge World Carbon Zero Racing. However Eaves backed away from the team to allow them to bring in some sponsorship held by another driver Gordon Shedden after a frustrating start to the season for Eaves (lack of spares and an underpowered engine) caused him to re-think whether he wanted to drive for the struggling CVR. Problems with the finances of the team meant the team later withdrew from the season.

It was speculated that Eaves may return to BTCC in the 2013–14 season with 888 which didn't materialise.

== Personal ==
Eaves is married and he has a daughter who was born in 2007 and a son in 2008.

== Racing record ==
=== Complete British Touring Car Championship results ===
(key) Races in bold indicate pole position – 1 point awarded in 2001–2002 all races, 2003–present just in first race (2000 in class). Races in italics indicate fastest lap – 1 point awarded all races (2000 in class) * signifies that driver lead race for at least one lap – 1 point given (2001–2002 just for feature race, 2003–present all races)

Year	Team	Car	Class	1	2	3	4	5	6	7	8	9	10	11	12	13	14	15	16	17	18	19	20	21	22	23	24	25	26	27	28	29	30	Pos	Pts	Class
2000	Touring Car V.I.P. Club	Peugeot 306 GTi	B	BRH; 1	BRH; 2	DON; 1	DON; 2	THR; 1	THR; 2	KNO; 1	KNO; 2	OUL; 1	OUL; 2	SIL; 1	SIL; 2	CRO; 1	CRO; 2	SNE; 1	SNE; 2	DON; 1	DON; 2	BRH; 1	BRH; 2	**OUL**; **1** ovr:11 cls:2	**OUL**; **2** ovr:10 cls:2	SIL; 1 ovr:11 cls:3	**SIL**; **2** ovr:9 cls:1							N/A	53	5th
2001	Peugeot Sport UK	Peugeot 406 Coupé	T	BRH; 1; 5†	BRH; 2 ovr:6 cls:6	THR; 1 ovr:16 cls:6	THR; 2 Ret	OUL; 1 ovr:18 cls:7	OUL; 2 Ret*	SIL; 1 ovr:10 cls:5	SIL; 2 Ret	MON; 1 ovr:10 cls:5	MON; 2 Ret	DON; 1 ovr:5 cls:5	DON; 2 ovr:4* cls:4	KNO; 1 Ret	KNO; 2 DNS	SNE; 1 ovr:21 cls:6	SNE; 2 Ret	CRO; 1 ovr:13 cls:6	CRO; 2 ovr:5 cls:5	OUL; 1 ovr:9 cls:6	OUL; 2 ovr:3 cls:3	SIL; 1 ovr:10 cls:5	SIL; 2 ovr:4 cls:4	DON; 1 Ret	DON; 2 ovr:5 cls:5	BRH; 1 ovr:8 cls:7	BRH; 2 ovr:3* cls:3					5th	115	
2002	Team Halfords	Peugeot 406 Coupé	T	BRH; 1 ovr:2 cls:2	BRH; 2 ovr:13 cls:10	OUL; 1 ovr:20 cls:13	OUL; 2 Ret	THR; 1 ovr:6 cls:6	THR; 2 ovr:6 cls:6	SIL; 1 ovr:12 cls:12	SIL; 2 ovr:7 cls:7	MON; 1 Ret	MON; 2 Ret	CRO; 1 ovr:9 cls:9	CRO; 2 ovr:4 cls:4	SNE; 1 ovr:13 cls:13	SNE; 2 ovr:7 cls:7	KNO; 1 ovr:12 cls:12	KNO; 2 Ret	BRH; 1 Ret	BRH; 2 ovr:21 cls:13	DON; 1 ovr:9 cls:9	DON; 2 Ret											10th	43	
2003	Team Halfords	Peugeot 307	T	MON; 1 Ret	MON; 2 ovr:8 cls:8	BRH; 1 ovr:11* cls:11	BRH; 2 Ret	THR; 1 ovr:9 cls:9	THR; 2 Ret	SIL; 1 Ret	SIL; 2 Ret	ROC; 1 Ret	ROC; 2 ovr:10 cls:10	CRO; 1 ovr:6* cls:6	CRO; 2 Ret	SNE; 1 Ret	SNE; 2 ovr:12 cls:12	BRH; 1 ovr:12 cls:12	BRH; 2 ovr:11 cls:11	DON; 1 ovr:11 cls:11	DON; 2 ovr:14 cls:14	OUL; 1 ovr:11 cls:11	OUL; 2 ovr:9 cls:9											15th	15	
2004	Computeach Racing with Halfords	Honda Civic Type-R		THR; 1; 5	THR; 2; 4*	THR; 3; 12	BRH; 1; 8	BRH; 2; 8	BRH; 3; 8	SIL; 1; 5	SIL; 2; 6	SIL; 3; 6	OUL; 1; 9	OUL; 2; 1*	**OUL**; **3**; 8	MON; 1 Ret	MON; 2 Ret	MON; 3; 3	CRO; 1; 7	CRO; 2; 3	CRO; 3; 12	KNO; 1; 6	KNO; 2; 3	KNO; 3; 2*	BRH; 1 Ret	BRH; 2; 9	BRH; 3 Ret	SNE; 1; 6	SNE; 2; 11	SNE; 3; 6	DON; 1; 8	DON; 2; 3	DON; 3; 4	8th	148	
2005	Team Halfords	Honda Integra Type-R		DON; 1; 3	DON; 2; 4	DON; 3; 2	THR; 1; 1*	**THR**; **2**; 1*	THR; 3; 1*	BRH; 1 Ret	BRH; 2; 3	BRH; 3; 2	OUL; 1; 3	OUL; 2; 3	OUL; 3; 6	CRO; 1; 5	CRO; 2; 10	**CRO**; **3**; 1*	MON; 1; 6	MON; 2; 2	MON; 3; 4	SNE; 1; 2	SNE; 2; 2	SNE; 3; 5	KNO; 1; 4	KNO; 2 Ret	KNO; 3; 6	SIL; 1 Ret	SIL; 2; 3	SIL; 3; 4	**BRH**; **1**; 1*	**BRH**; **2**; 2*	BRH; 3 Ret	**3rd**	**269**	
2009	Cartridge World Carbon Zero Racing	Seat León		BRH; 1; 9	BRH; 2; 8	BRH; 3; 6	THR; 1 Ret	THR; 2 Ret	THR; 3 Ret	DON; 1 DNS	DON; 2 DNS	DON; 3 DNS	OUL; 1; 16	OUL; 2; 13	OUL; 3; 14	CRO; 1 Ret	CRO; 2 DNS	CRO; 3 DNS	SNE; 1	SNE; 2	SNE; 3	KNO; 1	KNO; 2	KNO; 3	SIL; 1	SIL; 2	SIL; 3	ROC; 1	ROC; 2	ROC; 3	BRH; 1	BRH; 2	BRH; 3	17th	10	

† Event with 2 races staged for the different classes.
