= 2003 Renault Clio Cup United Kingdom =

The 2003 Elf Renault Clio Cup United Kingdom season began at Snetterton on 19 April and finished after 18 races over 11 events at Oulton Park on 21 September. The Championship was won by Jonathan Fildes driving for Total Control Racing.

== Teams & Drivers ==
All competitors raced in Renault Clio Cup 182s.

Team	No.	Drivers	Rounds
Team Griffin Racing	2	(United Kingdom) Julian Griffin	1-8
Team Griffin Racing	2	(United Kingdom) Matt Allison	9-11
Team Griffin Racing	29	(United Kingdom) Paul Maguire	1-7
Team Griffin Racing	29	(United Kingdom) Marcus Thomas	8-11
Team Griffin Racing	66	(United Kingdom) Fergus Geekie	9-11
Raw Media Racing	3	(United Kingdom) Nick Adcock	All
Mardi Gras Motorsport	4	(United Kingdom) John George	All
Mardi Gras Motorsport	5	(United Kingdom) Ed Pead	All
Aurock Motorsport	6	(United Kingdom) Natalie Barratt	11
Aurock Motorsport	16	(United Kingdom) Vince Martin	All
Aurock Motorsport	38	(United Kingdom) Steve Wood	7-11
Aurock Motorsport	99	(United Kingdom) Toby Phillips	7
Total Control Racing	7	(United Kingdom) Kevin Lloyd	All
Total Control Racing	22	(Republic of Ireland) Jonathan Fildes	All
Total Control Racing	23	(United Kingdom) Jan Prowse	7
OC Motorsport	8	(United Kingdom) Tom Onslow-Cole	4-11
Xcel Motorsport	9	(Republic of Ireland) Eoin Murray	All
Xcel Motorsport	10	(United Kingdom) Charlie Butler-Henderson	1-10
Xcel Motorsport	10	(United Kingdom) Andy Wood	11
Xcel Motorsport	11	(United Kingdom) Neil Waterworth	All
Xcel Motorsport	12	(United Kingdom) Oli Wilkinson	All
Mark Davies Racing	14	(United Kingdom) Mark Davies	1-9
Tim Sugden Motorsport	15	(United Kingdom) Martin Brackenbury	All
Boulevard Team Racing	17	(United Kingdom) Danny Buxton	1-7
Boulevard Team Racing	17	(United Kingdom) Paul Rivett	9-11
Boulevard Team Racing	27	(United Kingdom) Martin Johnson	All
Boulevard Team Racing	28	(United Kingdom) Syd Wilson	7
Stancombe Vehicle Engineering	20	(United Kingdom) Colum McCabe	7-11
SpeedEquipe	77	(United Kingdom) Rob Cullum	1-10
SpeedEquipe	77	(United Kingdom) Ian Curley	11
SpeedEquipe	88	(United Kingdom) Ian Curley	1-3
SpeedEquipe	88	(United Kingdom) Jason Porter	6-11

== Season Calendar ==
All races were held in the United Kingdom.

Round		Circuit	Date	Pole position	Fastest lap	Winning driver	Winning team
1	R1	Snetterton Motor Racing Circuit, Norfolk	19 April	(United Kingdom) Mark Davies	(United Kingdom) Mark Davies	(United Kingdom) Ed Pead	Mardi Gras Motorsport
1	R2	Snetterton Motor Racing Circuit, Norfolk	20 April	(United Kingdom) Mark Davies	(United Kingdom) Mark Davies	(United Kingdom) Ed Pead	Mardi Gras Motorsport
2	R3	Brands Hatch Indy, Kent	5 May	(United Kingdom) Danny Buxton	(United Kingdom) Danny Buxton	(United Kingdom) Danny Buxton	Boulevard Team Racing
3	R4	Thruxton Circuit, Hampshire	25 May	(United Kingdom) Danny Buxton	(United Kingdom) Danny Buxton	(United Kingdom) Danny Buxton	Boulevard Team Racing
3	R5	Thruxton Circuit, Hampshire	26 May	(United Kingdom) Danny Buxton	(Republic of Ireland) Jonathan Fildes	(United Kingdom) Danny Buxton	Boulevard Team Racing
4	R6	Silverstone, Northampshire	7 June	(United Kingdom) Danny Buxton	(Republic of Ireland) Jonathan Fildes	(Republic of Ireland) Eoin Murray	Xcel Motorsport
4	R7	Silverstone, Northampshire	8 June	(United Kingdom) Mark Davies	(United Kingdom) Danny Buxton	(Republic of Ireland) Jonathan Fildes	Total Control Racing
5	R8	Rockingham, Northampshire	21 June	(United Kingdom) Danny Buxton	(United Kingdom) Danny Buxton	(United Kingdom) Danny Buxton	Boulevard Team Racing
5	R9	Rockingham, Northampshire	22 June	(United Kingdom) Danny Buxton	(United Kingdom) Danny Buxton	(United Kingdom) Danny Buxton	Boulevard Team Racing
6	R10	Croft Circuit, Yorkshire	13 July	(United Kingdom) Danny Buxton	(United Kingdom) Danny Buxton	(Republic of Ireland) Jonathan Fildes	Total Control Racing
7	R11	Donington Park GP, Leicestershire	26 July	(United Kingdom) Danny Buxton	(United Kingdom) Danny Buxton	(United Kingdom) Danny Buxton	Boulevard Team Racing
7	R12	Donington Park GP, Leicestershire	27 July	(United Kingdom) Danny Buxton	(United Kingdom) Danny Buxton	(United Kingdom) Danny Buxton	Boulevard Team Racing
8	R13	Snetterton Motor Racing Circuit, Norfolk	8 August	(Republic of Ireland) Jonathan Fildes	(Republic of Ireland) Eoin Murray	(Republic of Ireland) Eoin Murray	Xcel Motorsport
8	R14	Snetterton Motor Racing Circuit, Norfolk	9 August	(Republic of Ireland) Jonathan Fildes	(Republic of Ireland) Jonathan Fildes	(United Kingdom) Ed Pead	Mardi Gras Motorsport
9	R15	Brands Hatch Indy	25 August	(Republic of Ireland) Eoin Murray	(Republic of Ireland) Jonathan Fildes	(Republic of Ireland) Eoin Murray	Xcel Motorsport
10	R16	Donington Park National, Leicestershire	6 September	(Republic of Ireland) Jonathan Fildes	(United Kingdom) Nick Adcock	(Republic of Ireland) Jonathan Fildes	Total Control Racing
10	R17	Donington Park National, Leicestershire	7 September	(Republic of Ireland) Jonathan Fildes	(Republic of Ireland) Jonathan Fildes	(Republic of Ireland) Eoin Murray	Xcel Motorsport
11	R18	Oulton Park, Cheshire	21 September	(United Kingdom) Ian Curley	(Republic of Ireland) Jonathan Fildes	(Republic of Ireland) Jonathan Fildes	Total Control Racing

== Drivers' Championship ==
Pos	Driver	SNE		BHI	THR		SIL		ROC		CRO	DON		SNE		BHI	DON		OUL	Pts
1	(Republic of Ireland) Jonathan Fildes	3	5	6	7	2	5	1	2	3	1	4	4	2	3	11	1	5	1	447
2	(United Kingdom) Ed Pead	1	1	3	3	4	3	5	3	4	4	7	3	3	1	2	Ret	DNS	6	394
3	(Republic of Ireland) Eoin Murray	12	9	2	2	3	1	15	16	8	3	2	2	1	10	1	7	1	10	376
4	(United Kingdom) Oli Wilkinson	2	3	5	8	11	4	4	4	2	2	16	7	Ret	2	4	4	3	2	365
5	(United Kingdom) Danny Buxton	8	2	1	1	1	6	3	1	1	6	1	1							343
6	(United Kingdom) Vince Martin	7	6	9	5	9	7	11	8	9	5	10	10	Ret	5	3	Ret	6	9	247
7	(United Kingdom) Mark Davies	6	4	10	4	5	2	2	6	11	Ret	3	9	4	Ret	Ret				240
8	(United Kingdom) Nick Adcock	14	Ret	11	10	Ret	9	14	5	5	Ret	9	5	Ret	7	13	3	4	5	212
9	(United Kingdom) Neil Waterworth	16	12	18	13	17	10	8	7	15	13	8	15	9	4	5	2	Ret	12	195
10	(United Kingdom) Martin Johnson	10	Ret	8	11	10	12	6	9	14	9	11	8	5	13	NC	9	9	14	187
11	(United Kingdom) Martin Brackenbury	15	10	16	Ret	12	14	9	10	6	7	6	6	12	Ret	9	10	Ret	7	179
12	(United Kingdom) John George	11	14	14	Ret	15	16	12	14	13	10	13	16	8	11	6	8	11	16	154
13	(United Kingdom) Charlie Butler-Henderson	5	7	4	6	6	8	Ret	Ret	DNS	Ret	5	Ret	NC	8	Ret	Ret	8		144
14	(United Kingdom) Rob Cullum	Ret	8	7	NC	7	Ret	NC	17	10	14	Ret	17	7	6	10	12	Ret		126
15	(United Kingdom) Julian Griffin	Ret	11	15	14	14	15	10	12	12	8	15	12	6	9					124
16	(United Kingdom) Paul Maguire	9	Ret	13	12	8	13	7	13	17	Ret	14	19							88
17	(United Kingdom) Kevin Lloyd	13	15	17	15	16	17	13	15	16	11	20	21	11	17	17	14	Ret	21	88
18	(United Kingdom) Ian Curley	4	13	12	9	13													4	81
19	(United Kingdom) Paul Rivett															Ret	5	2	3	73
20	(United Kingdom) Tom Onslow-Cole						11	Ret	11	7	Ret	Ret	11	Ret	16	Ret	Ret	14	11	68
21	(United Kingdom) Matt Allison															7	6	7	8	64
22	(United Kingdom) Jason Porter										12	17	13	Ret	Ret	14	Ret	10	13	47
23	(United Kingdom) Steve Wood											18	23	10	14	8	Ret	13	19	45
24	(United Kingdom) Fergus Geekie															12	11	12	18	31
25	(United Kingdom) Colum McCabe											21	22	13	15	15	Ret	Ret	15	26
26	(United Kingdom) Marcus Thomas													Ret	12	16	13	Ret	Ret	22
27	(United Kingdom) Jan Prowse											12	14							16
28	(United Kingdom) Natalie Barratt																		17	4
29	(United Kingdom) Syd Wilson											Ret	18							3
30	(United Kingdom) Toby Phillips											19	20							3
31	(United Kingdom) Andy Wood																		20	1
Pos	Driver	SNE		BHI	THR		SIL		ROC		CRO	DON		SNE		BHI	DON		OUL	Pts
