= Liam McMillan =

British racing driver (born 1990)

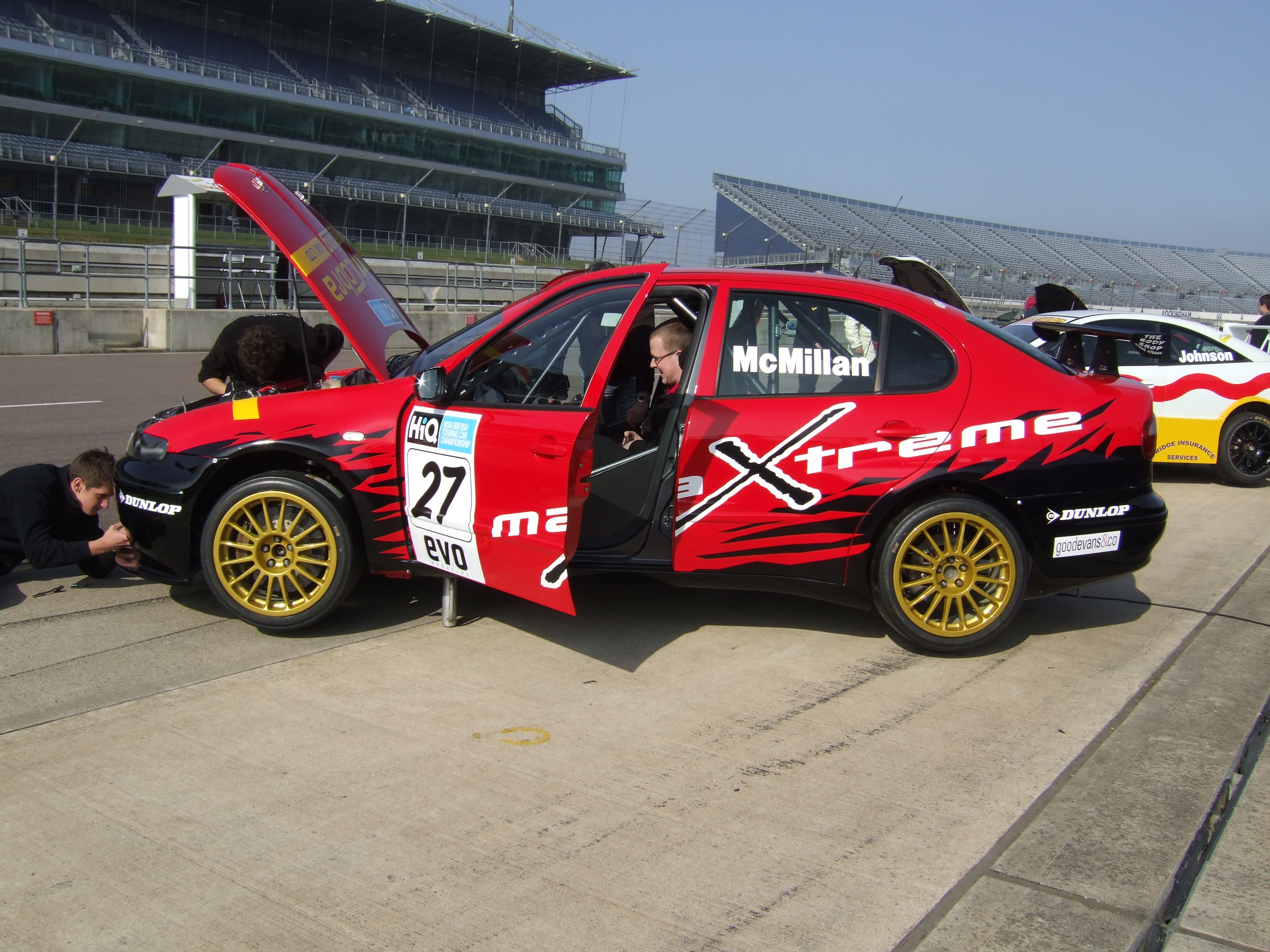
- Nationality: (United Kingdom) British
- Born: 2 March 1990 (age 36) King's Lynn, England

Previous series
- 2009 2008 2007–08 2007 2006: BTCC; SEAT León Eurocup; SEAT Leon Supercopa Spain; SEAT Cupra Championship; SAXMAX Championship

Championship titles
- 2006: SAXMAX Championship

Liam McMillan (born 2 March 1990 in King's Lynn) is a British racing driver.

== Racing career ==
McMillan first competed in saloon racing in 2006, competing in the 750 Motor Club's SAXMAX Championship. McMillan dominated the championship starting every one of the ten races from pole, recording eight fastest laps and scoring nine wins to win by over fifty points in the championship standings. The only blip in the win tally was at the penultimate round at Snetterton, when he finished in eighth position.

In 2007, McMillan stepped up to the SEAT Cupra Championship, driving in the New Leon Cupra Class. His best result of the year was a sixth place in the rain-shortened round eleven at Donington Park. and finished the season in twelfth place from a field of thirteen runners. He also entered three rounds of the Spanish SEAT Leon Supercopa, scoring a solitary point.

For 2008, McMillan competed a full season in the SEAT Leon Supercopa with the Triple R Team and ended the season tenth on points, including three podium finishes – all coming at the triple-header Circuit de Catalunya season finale. This was combined with four rounds entered in the inaugural SEAT León Eurocup, scoring four points and a best finish of sixth in the opening race at Circuit de Valencia.

In 2009, McMillan competed in the British Touring Car Championship in a self prepared ex-works SEAT Toledo for his independent family-run Maxtreme Team, which was managed by his father Paul. However, the team never got its engine back after sending it for a refit, forcing them out of the series after just three rounds.

== Racing record ==
=== Complete British Touring Car Championship results ===
(key) (Races in bold indicate pole position – 1 point awarded in first race) (Races in italics indicate fastest lap – 1 point awarded all races) (* signifies that driver lead race for at least one lap – 1 point awarded all races)

Year	Team	Car	1	2	3	4	5	6	7	8	9	10	11	12	13	14	15	16	17	18	19	20	21	22	23	24	25	26	27	28	29	30	DC	Pts
2009	Maxtreme	SEAT Toledo Cupra	BRH; 1; 14	BRH; 2 Ret	BRH; 3 Ret	THR; 1 Ret	THR; 2; 19	THR; 3 Ret	DON; 1; 13	DON; 2 Ret	DON; 3; 14	OUL; 1	OUL; 2	OUL; 3	CRO; 1	CRO; 2	CRO; 3	SNE; 1	SNE; 2	SNE; 3	KNO; 1	KNO; 2	KNO; 3	SIL; 1	SIL; 2	SIL; 3	ROC; 1	ROC; 2	ROC; 3	BRH; 1	BRH; 2	BRH; 3	26th	0
