= Clyde Valley Racing =

British motorsport team

(United Kingdom) Clyde Valley Racing
- Founded: 2006
- Team principal(s): Colin Neill
- Current series: BTCC

Clyde Valley Racing (also known as CVR) were a British motorsport team. For 2009 they entered the British Touring Car Championship for the first time, with two SEAT Leóns under the Cartridge World Carbon Zero Racing banner, having secured Cartridge World as their main sponsor. For their debut season in the BTCC, they acquired the driving services of experienced Dan Eaves and Adam Jones. Colin Neill was the team principal with former Williams F1 engineer Doug Bebb as team manager.

CVR aimed to enter the BTCC as the series first ever carbon neutral team. Both cars were powered by Bio-ethanol fuel, with the view of showing the world of motorsport the performance, reliability and environmental advantages of new fuels. Previous attempts to enter the BTCC in 2007 and 2008 with bio-fuel Chevrolet Lacettis had failed due to lack of sponsorship.

Halfway through the 2009 season and after struggling with a lack of spare parts, technical problems and lack of funds, Eaves decided to back out to allow a driver with further funding to take the seat. He was replaced by Gordon Shedden who brought sponsorship with him from Clydesdale Bank etc. After round twenty-one at Knockhill, CVR withdrew from the BTCC as funding had run out.
