= 2009 British Touring Car Championship =

52nd season of the British Touring Car Championship

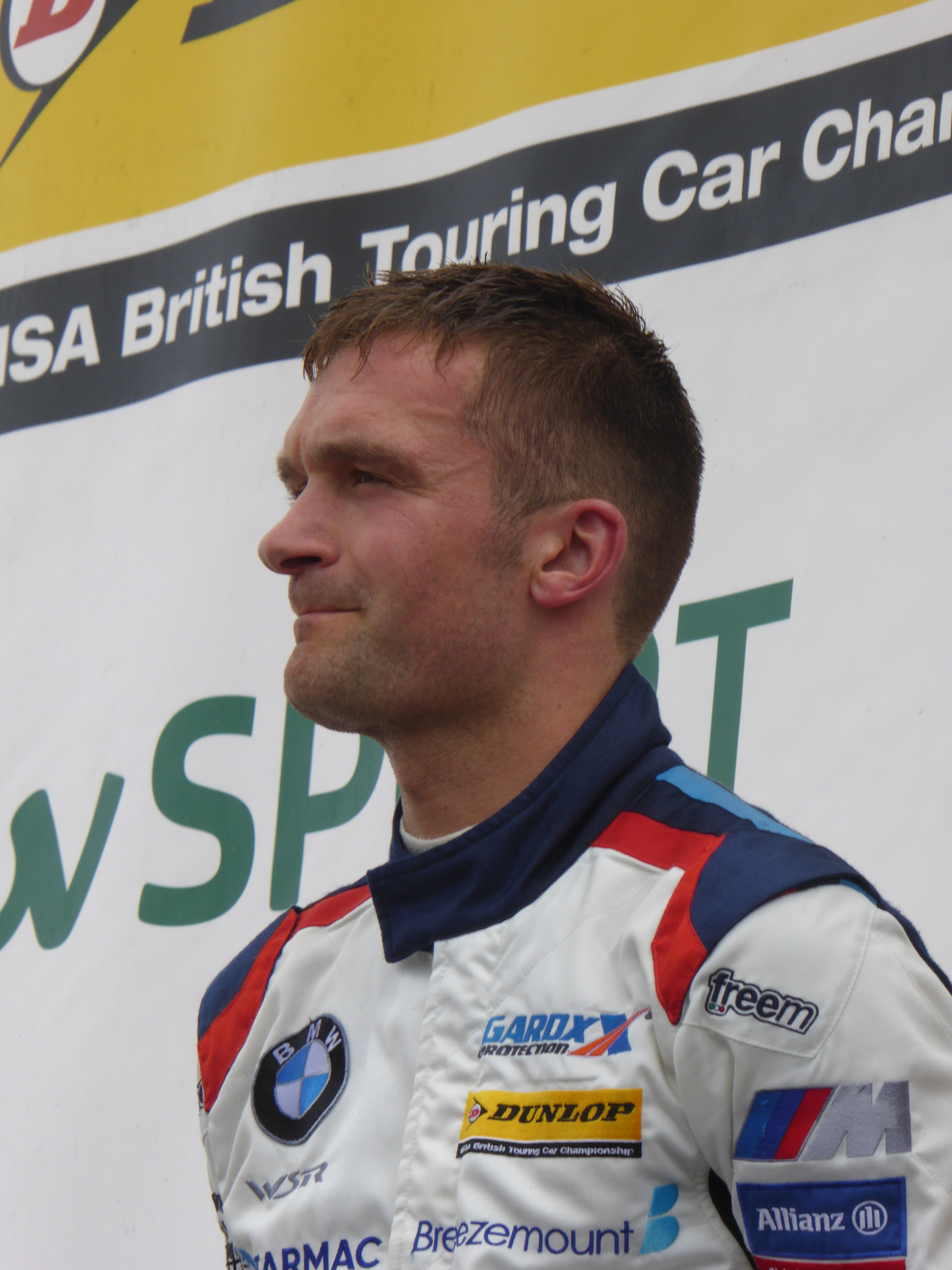
Colin Turkington became the first Northern Irish driver to win the Championship.

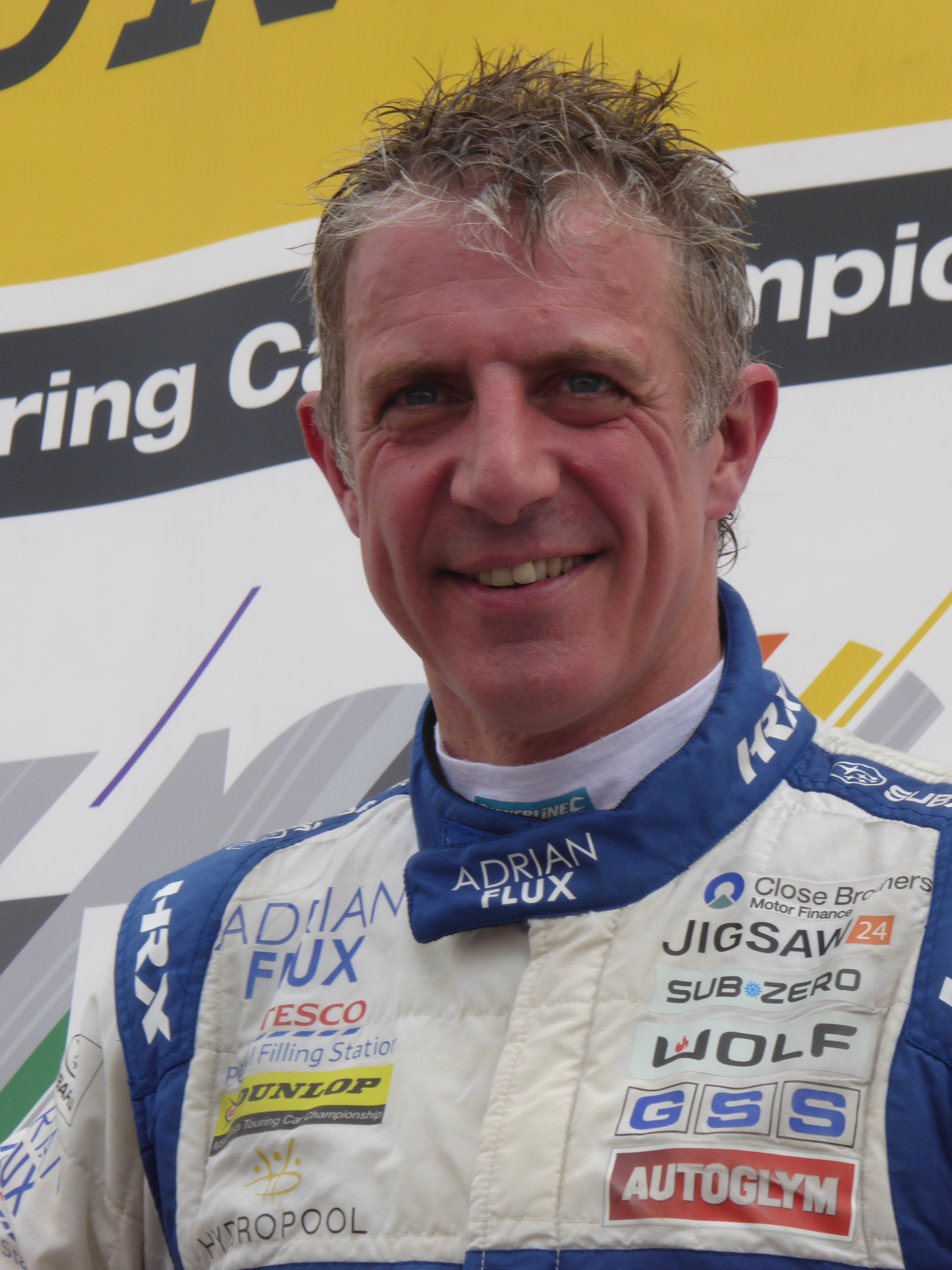
Jason Plato came second, with only a 5-point margin.

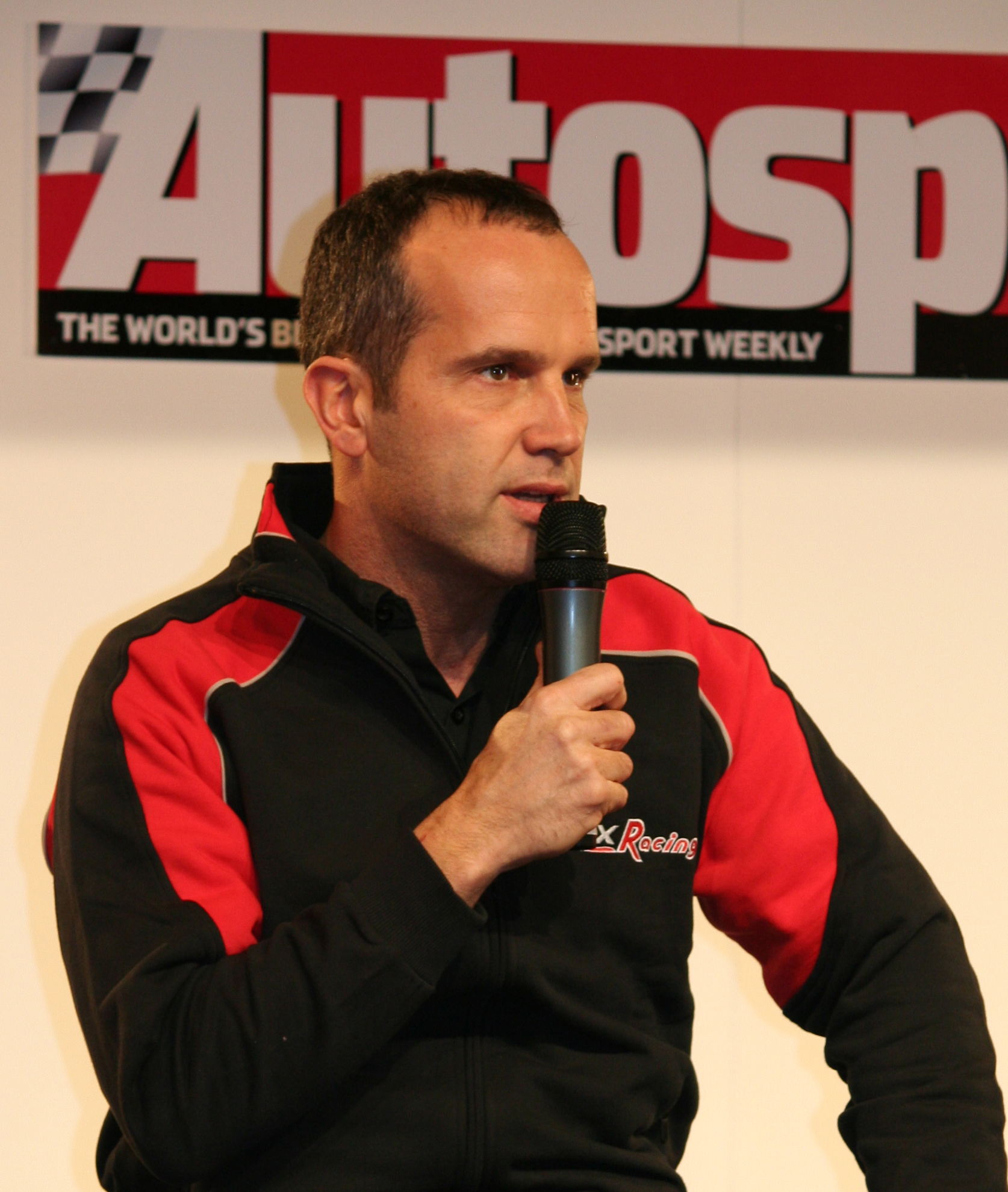
Italy’s Fabrizio Giovanardi came third in the championship, 4 points behind Jason Plato.

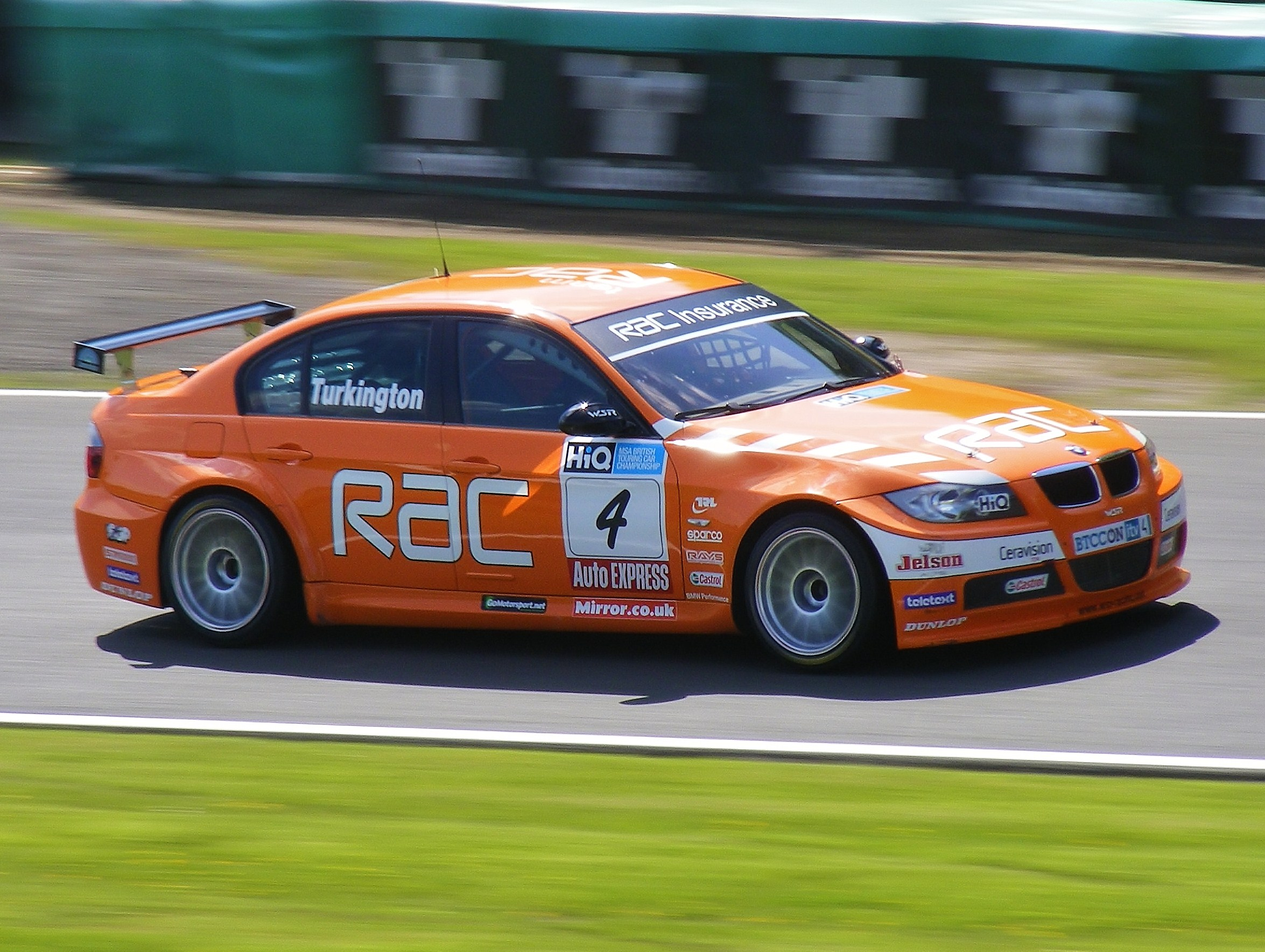
Colin Turkington became the first Northern Irish winner of the championship. In addition, he wrapped up a third consecutive independents' driver title, with his Team RAC also picking up the Independent Teams Trophy.

The 2009 HiQ MSA British Touring Car Championship season was the 52nd British Touring Car Championship (BTCC) season. It began at Brands Hatch on the Indy layout on 5 April and finished after 30 races over 10 events on the Grand Prix layout at Brands Hatch on 4 October. Colin Turkington won the championship for the first time, ahead of Jason Plato and Fabrizio Giovanardi.

The season also saw Airwaves BMW score their first win in the series when Rob Collard won the second race of the day at the opening meeting at Brands Hatch. The team seemed to have added a second win in race three as Jonathan Adam crossed the line first but he was demoted to second after making contact with Jason Plato handing Plato the win.

Andrew Jordan became the youngest driver to qualify on pole at Donington after team-mate Fabrizio Giovanardi was excluded for failing technical checks.

Also, Stephen Jelley took his first win in the series at the first race at Rockingham. He followed this up with another victory in race 3, a race that saw Tom Chilton become the first driver to score a podium position in a Ford Focus following a collision between Plato, Turkington and Plato's team mate James Nash.

At the final meeting at Brands Hatch, Chilton took pole position becoming the first Ford driver to do so since 2000. All three races were won by Jason Plato, becoming only the second driver to do so following Dan Eaves' hat-trick at Thruxton in 2005; but this was not enough to win the title. Colin Turkington became British Touring Car Champion for the first time, coincidentally becoming the first Northern Irishman to do so.

Former British Grand Prix winner Johnny Herbert contested the final three meetings in a Team Dynamics Honda Civic.

== Changes for 2009 ==
Triple 8 continued to run Vauxhall Vectras under the VX Racing banner, retaining the reigning double Champion Fabrizio Giovanardi and Matt Neal but replacing Tom Onslow-Cole with Andrew Jordan. The Vauxhall Astra Coupe made a return after a two-year absence with Renault Clio Cup graduates Boulevard Team Racing with Martin Johnson driving an Astra previously run by Erkut Kizilirmak in the Turkish Touring Car Championship.

After SEAT withdrew at the end of 2008, Jason Plato made a last minute switch to an RML Group-run Chevrolet Lacetti under the Racing Silverline banner. As the season progressed, the team expanded to include 2008 Runner-up Mat Jackson and newcomer James Nash. Tempus Sport also entered a Lacetti for Harry Vaulkhard, a second entry was registered but never materialised and the team pulled out mid-season with Vaulkhard's entry taken over by Bamboo Engineering for the remainder of the season.

WSR retained Colin Turkington and Stephen Jelley and expanded to three cars with Anthony Reid returning for the last three meetings to help Turkington's title challenge. Motorbase Performance entered as Airwaves BMW with Rob Collard as lead driver but Steven Kane was replaced by double SEAT Cupra Champion Jonathan Adam. After sitting out the 2008 season, Team AFM Racing returned with their diesel-powered BMW 1 Series, this time with Nick Leason driving but the team pulled out after three meetings.

After a three-year absence, Arena Motorsport returned under the Team Aon banner, bringing Ford back to the BTCC for the first time since 2000. The team ran a pair of Ford Focuses for Tom Chilton and former Production Class Champion Alan Morrison but Morrison left after the first four meetings and was replaced by Tom Onslow-Cole.

Having previously tried and failed to enter bio-ethanol powered Chevrolets in 2007, Team Clyde Valley Racing finally made their debut under the Cartridge World Carbon Zero Racing banner, running bio-ethanol powered SEAT Leons. Former Independent's Champion Dan Eaves was the team's lead driver, Indian driver Phiroze Bilimoria was originally signed to partner Eaves, but before the season started, Bilimoria was replaced by Adam Jones. Eaves stood down mid-season and was replaced by Gordon Shedden but the team only lasted a couple more meetings before pulling out completely. Shedden returned for the last two meetings with his SEAT now run by GR Asia under the Club SEAT banner. Newcomers Maxtreme entered Liam McMillan in one of the SEAT Toledos that BTC Racing ran in 2008 but pulled out after just three meetings. BTC Racing initially planned to upgrade to a pair of SEAT Leons but shelved these plans before the season started.

Team Dynamics once again ran a pair of Super 2000 Honda Civics, initially retaining Gordon Shedden and replacing Tom Chilton with the returning David Pinkney. Shedden was replaced by returning former double Champion James Thompson after the first meeting. Thompson lasted six meetings before being replaced by ex-F1 driver Johnny Herbert for the remainder of the season. After two seasons of running the Vauxhall Astra Sport Hatch, Tech-Speed switched to a pair of ex-Team Dynamics Honda Integras with Martyn Bell entering his second season with the team and Paul O'Neill joining for what would be his first full season since 2003. TH Motorsport continued to run a Honda Integra for John George and entered a Civic Type-R for Matt Hamilton in the final two meetings. A possible late-season return for Michael Doyle and his In-Tune Racing Civic was hinted at but never eventuated.

Jason Hughes intended to continue running his MG ZS but was forced to sit out the first four meetings and ultimately never raced. Other notable failed entries included Paul Luti in a Dreadnought-run MG and Ian Court in a self-run Alfa Romeo 156.

== Entry list ==
Team	Car	No	Drivers	Rounds
Constructor Entries
(United Kingdom) VX Racing	Vauxhall Vectra	1	(Italy) Fabrizio Giovanardi	All
(United Kingdom) VX Racing	Vauxhall Vectra	5	(United Kingdom) Matt Neal	All
(United Kingdom) VX Racing	Vauxhall Vectra	77	(United Kingdom) Andrew Jordan	All
Independent Constructor Entries
(United Kingdom) Team Aon	Ford Focus ST	6	(United Kingdom) Tom Onslow-Cole	5, 8–10
(United Kingdom) Team Aon	Ford Focus ST	10	(United Kingdom) Tom Chilton	All
(United Kingdom) Team Aon	Ford Focus ST	20	(United Kingdom) Alan Morrison	1–4
(United Kingdom) Team Dynamics	Honda Civic	35	(United Kingdom) James Thompson	2–7
(United Kingdom) Team Dynamics	Honda Civic	45	(United Kingdom) Johnny Herbert	8–10
(United Kingdom) Team Dynamics	Honda Civic	52	(United Kingdom) Gordon Shedden	1
(United Kingdom) Team Dynamics	Honda Civic	55	(United Kingdom) David Pinkney	All
Independent S2000 Entries
(United Kingdom) Racing Silverline	Chevrolet Lacetti	2	(United Kingdom) Mat Jackson	3–10
(United Kingdom) Racing Silverline	Chevrolet Lacetti	3	(United Kingdom) Jason Plato	2–10
(United Kingdom) RML	Chevrolet Lacetti	3	(United Kingdom) Jason Plato	1
(United Kingdom) RML	Chevrolet Lacetti	2	(United Kingdom) Mat Jackson	2
(United Kingdom) RML	Chevrolet Lacetti	23	(United Kingdom) James Nash	4–6, 8–9
(United Kingdom) Team RAC	BMW 320si	4	(United Kingdom) Colin Turkington	All
(United Kingdom) Team RAC	BMW 320si	14	(United Kingdom) Anthony Reid	8–10
(United Kingdom) Team RAC	BMW 320si	44	(United Kingdom) Stephen Jelley	All
(United Kingdom) Cartridge World; Carbon Zero Racing	SEAT León	9	(United Kingdom) Adam Jones	1–6
(United Kingdom) Cartridge World; Carbon Zero Racing	SEAT León	85	(United Kingdom) Dan Eaves	1–5
(United Kingdom) Cartridge World; Carbon Zero Racing	SEAT León	52	(United Kingdom) Gordon Shedden	6–7
(United Kingdom) Club SEAT	SEAT León	52	(United Kingdom) Gordon Shedden	9–10
(United Kingdom) Airwaves BMW	BMW 320si	11	(United Kingdom) Rob Collard	All
(United Kingdom) Airwaves BMW	BMW 320si	12	(United Kingdom) Jonathan Adam	All
(United Kingdom) Team AFM Racing	BMW 120d	16	(United Kingdom) Nick Leason	1–3
(United Kingdom) Tempus Sport	Chevrolet Lacetti	17	(United Kingdom) Harry Vaulkhard	1–5
(Hong Kong) bamboo engineering	Chevrolet Lacetti	17	(United Kingdom) Harry Vaulkhard	6–10
(United Kingdom) Maxtreme	SEAT Toledo Cupra	27	(United Kingdom) Liam McMillan	1–3
Independent BTC-T Entries
(United Kingdom) Sunshine.co.uk with Tech-Speed Motorsport	Honda Integra Type-R	15	(United Kingdom) Martyn Bell	1–5, 8, 10
(United Kingdom) Sunshine.co.uk with Tech-Speed Motorsport	Honda Integra Type-R	29	(United Kingdom) Paul O'Neill	2–10
(United Kingdom) Team KWR	MG ZS	28	(United Kingdom) Jason Hughes	None
(United Kingdom) TH Motorsport Racing with JAG	Honda Integra Type-R	50	(United Kingdom) John George	All
(United Kingdom) TH Motorsport Racing with Inten	Honda Civic Type-R	98	(United Kingdom) Matt Hamilton	9–10
(United Kingdom) Boulevard Team Racing	Vauxhall Astra Coupé	63	(United Kingdom) Martin Johnson	All

- Jason Hughes appeared on the official entry list but was forced to miss the opening rounds due to injury and ultimately never raced.

=== Driver changes ===
Changed teams

- Tom Chilton: Team Dynamics → Team Aon
- Mat Jackson: BMW Dealer Team UK → RML/Racing Silverline
- Adam Jones: Team Air Cool → Cartridge World Carbon Zero Racing
- Andrew Jordan: Team Eurotech → VX Racing
- Tom Onslow-Cole: VX Racing → Team Aon
- Jason Plato: SEAT Sport → RML/Racing Silverline
- Gordon Shedden: Team Dynamics → Cartridge World Carbon Zero Racing/Club SEAT
- Harry Vaulkhard: Robertshaw Racing → Tempus Sport/bamboo engineering

Entering/re-entering BTCC

- Jonathan Adam: SEAT Cupra Championship (Total Control Racing) → Airwaves BMW
- Dan Eaves: Three-year sabbatical → Cartridge World Carbon Zero Racing
- Matt Hamilton: FIA GT4 European Cup → TH Motorsport
- Johnny Herbert: Speedcar Series (JMB Racing) → Team Dynamics
- Martin Johnson: Renault Clio Cup (Boulevard Team Racing) → Boulevard Team Racing
- Nick Leason: 18-month sabbatical → AFM Racing
- Liam McMillan: SEAT León Supercopa (Triple R) → Maxtreme
- Alan Morrison: Five-year sabbatical → Team Aon
- James Nash: SEAT León Eurocup (SUNRED) → RML
- Paul O'Neill: British GT Championship (Team RPM) → Sunshine.co.uk with Tech-Speed Motorsport
- David Pinkney: British GT Championship (Tech 9 Racing) → Team Dynamics
- Anthony Reid: Porsche Carrera Cup → Team RAC
- James Thompson: World Touring Car Championship (N.Technology) → Team Dynamics

Leaving BTCC

- Michael Doyle: In-Tune Racing → Unknown
- Mike Jordan: Team Eurotech → Britcar (JordanSport.co.uk)
- Steven Kane: Motorbase Performance → FIA Formula Two Championship Test Driver
- Erkut Kızılırmak: Arkas Racing → Turkish Touring Car Championship (Arkas Racing)
- Stuart Oliver: BTC Racing → Truck racing only
- Chris Stockton: BTC Racing → Unknown
- Alan Taylor: Robertshaw Racing → Unknown
- Darren Turner: SEAT Sport → Le Mans Series (Aston Martin Racing) and FIA GT Championship (Gigawave MotorSport)

Pre-season changes

- Indian driver Phiroze Bilimoria signed for Cartridge World Carbon Zero Racing alongside Dan Eaves but was replaced by Adam Jones before the official entry list was released.

Mid-season changes

- Gordon Shedden was replaced by James Thompson at Team Dynamics after the opening race weekend.
- Liam McMillan and Nick Leason's respective teams both dropped out after the first three rounds.
- Tom Onslow-Cole replaced Alan Morrison at Team Aon at Croft. The team ran a single car for Tom Chilton in the subsequent two meetings.
- Martyn Bell missed rounds six and seven due to a knee injury; he was not replaced, leaving Paul O'Neill to race the sole Techspeed entry.
- Shedden replaced Dan Eaves at Cartridge World Carbon Zero Racing ahead of round six of the championship.
- Thompson will miss the final three race weekends due to other commitments. He has been replaced at Team Dynamics by Johnny Herbert.
- Anthony Reid raced a third Team RAC car from Silverstone.
- Cartridge World Carbon Zero Racing left the championship before Silverstone.
- Matt Hamilton joined the series at Rockingham.
- Shedden returned to the series at Rockingham under the Club SEAT banner.

== Calendar ==
All races were held in the United Kingdom. The 2009 season had ten race weekends with three BTCC rounds at each. Provisional dates were announced by series organisers on 11 July 2008. The calendar was finalised on 17 March 2009, when all race timetables were announced.

Round		Circuit	Date	Pole position	Fastest lap	Winning driver	Winning team
1	R1	Brands Hatch Indy, Kent	5 April	(United Kingdom) Matt Neal	(United Kingdom) Rob Collard	(United Kingdom) Matt Neal	VX Racing
1	R2	Brands Hatch Indy, Kent	5 April		(United Kingdom) Matt Neal	(United Kingdom) Rob Collard	Airwaves BMW
1	R3	Brands Hatch Indy, Kent	5 April		(United Kingdom) Jonathan Adam	(United Kingdom) Jason Plato	RML
2	R4	Thruxton Circuit, Hampshire	26 April	(Italy) Fabrizio Giovanardi	(Italy) Fabrizio Giovanardi	(Italy) Fabrizio Giovanardi	VX Racing
2	R5	Thruxton Circuit, Hampshire	26 April		(Italy) Fabrizio Giovanardi	(United Kingdom) Colin Turkington	Team RAC
2	R6	Thruxton Circuit, Hampshire	26 April		(United Kingdom) Mat Jackson	(United Kingdom) Mat Jackson	RML
3	R7	Donington Park, Leicestershire	17 May	(United Kingdom) Andrew Jordan	(United Kingdom) Mat Jackson	(United Kingdom) James Thompson	Team Dynamics
3	R8	Donington Park, Leicestershire	17 May		(Italy) Fabrizio Giovanardi	(United Kingdom) James Thompson	Team Dynamics
3	R9	Donington Park, Leicestershire	17 May		(United Kingdom) Paul O'Neill	(United Kingdom) Rob Collard	Airwaves BMW
4	R10	Oulton Park, Cheshire	31 May	(United Kingdom) Jason Plato	(United Kingdom) Mat Jackson	(United Kingdom) Colin Turkington	Team RAC
4	R11	Oulton Park, Cheshire	31 May		(United Kingdom) Colin Turkington	(United Kingdom) Colin Turkington	Team RAC
4	R12	Oulton Park, Cheshire	31 May		(United Kingdom) Rob Collard	(United Kingdom) James Thompson	Team Dynamics
5	R13	Croft Circuit, North Yorkshire	14 June	(United Kingdom) Colin Turkington	(United Kingdom) Colin Turkington	(United Kingdom) Colin Turkington	Team RAC
5	R14	Croft Circuit, North Yorkshire	14 June		(United Kingdom) Colin Turkington	(United Kingdom) Colin Turkington	Team RAC
5	R15	Croft Circuit, North Yorkshire	14 June		(United Kingdom) Andrew Jordan	(Italy) Fabrizio Giovanardi	VX Racing
6	R16	Snetterton Motor Racing Circuit, Norfolk	2 August	(United Kingdom) Jason Plato	(Italy) Fabrizio Giovanardi	(Italy) Fabrizio Giovanardi	VX Racing
6	R17	Snetterton Motor Racing Circuit, Norfolk	2 August		(United Kingdom) Jason Plato	(Italy) Fabrizio Giovanardi	VX Racing
6	R18	Snetterton Motor Racing Circuit, Norfolk	2 August		(United Kingdom) Jason Plato	(United Kingdom) Colin Turkington	Team RAC
7	R19	Knockhill Racing Circuit, Fife	16 August	(United Kingdom) Jason Plato	(United Kingdom) Jason Plato	(United Kingdom) Jason Plato	Racing Silverline
7	R20	Knockhill Racing Circuit, Fife	16 August		(Italy) Fabrizio Giovanardi	(Italy) Fabrizio Giovanardi	VX Racing
7	R21	Knockhill Racing Circuit, Fife	16 August		(United Kingdom) Jason Plato	(United Kingdom) Mat Jackson	Racing Silverline
8	R22	Silverstone Circuit, Northamptonshire	30 August	(United Kingdom) Mat Jackson	(United Kingdom) James Nash	(United Kingdom) Mat Jackson	Racing Silverline
8	R23	Silverstone Circuit, Northamptonshire	30 August		(United Kingdom) Jason Plato	(United Kingdom) Jason Plato	Racing Silverline
8	R24	Silverstone Circuit, Northamptonshire	30 August		(United Kingdom) Mat Jackson	(United Kingdom) Mat Jackson	Racing Silverline
9	R25	Rockingham Motor Speedway, Northamptonshire	20 September	(United Kingdom) Jason Plato	(United Kingdom) Jason Plato	(United Kingdom) Stephen Jelley	Team RAC
9	R26	Rockingham Motor Speedway, Northamptonshire	20 September		(United Kingdom) Jason Plato	(United Kingdom) Jason Plato	Racing Silverline
9	R27	Rockingham Motor Speedway, Northamptonshire	20 September		(United Kingdom) Stephen Jelley	(United Kingdom) Stephen Jelley	Team RAC
10	R28	Brands Hatch GP, Kent	4 October	(United Kingdom) Tom Chilton	(United Kingdom) Jason Plato	(United Kingdom) Jason Plato	Racing Silverline
10	R29	Brands Hatch GP, Kent	4 October		(United Kingdom) Matt Neal	(United Kingdom) Jason Plato	Racing Silverline
10	R30	Brands Hatch GP, Kent	4 October		(United Kingdom) Gordon Shedden	(United Kingdom) Jason Plato	Racing Silverline

== Championship standings ==
Points system
**1st**	**2nd**	**3rd**	**4th**	**5th**	**6th**	**7th**	**8th**	**9th**	**10th**	Fastest lap	Lead a lap
15	12	10	8	6	5	4	3	2	1	1	1

- No driver may collect more than one "Lead a Lap" point per race no matter how many laps they lead.
- Race 1 polesitter receives 1 point.

=== Drivers Championship ===
Pos	Driver	BHI			THR			DON			OUL			CRO			SNE			KNO			SIL			ROC			BHGP			Pts
1	(United Kingdom) Colin Turkington	3*	2*	4	4	1*	9	Ret	5	2	1*	**1***	11	**1***	**1***	6	5	2	1	4	3	5	4	4	3	10	4	4	8	3	2*	275
2	(United Kingdom) Jason Plato	6	10	**1***	10	6	4	7	4	3	**2**	3	5	3	3	5	**Ret**	3	13	**1***	**Ret**	2	2	1*	7	**2**	1*	12	1*	**1***	1*	270
3	(Italy) Fabrizio Giovanardi	2	16	Ret	**1***	**2***	8	8	3	5	4	2	6	5	5	1*	1*	**1***	2	6	1*	3	5	2	5	6	3	11	3	2	4	266
4	(United Kingdom) Matt Neal	**1***	**3**	3	2	3	7	3	2	8	7	4	3	6	6	8	9	14	3	Ret	4	4	10	Ret	13	Ret	NC	Ret	5	8	**5***	170
5	(United Kingdom) Mat Jackson				8	9	1*	10	6	4	19	Ret	8	Ret	DNS	DNS	2	NC	DNS	3	2	1*	**1***	**3***	1*	3	2*	5	12	12	11	165
6	(United Kingdom) Rob Collard	4*	1*	8	17	5	5	4	9	1*	9	Ret	4	4	4	7	Ret	7	Ret*	Ret	12	Ret	6*	9	**2***	4	Ret	Ret	6	4	Ret	145
7	(United Kingdom) Stephen Jelley	7	4	Ret	7	4	6	Ret	DNS	DNS	5	14	Ret	2	2	3	6	13	Ret	8	8	10	7	12	4	1*	**6***	1*	14	11	6	137
8	(United Kingdom) Jonathan Adam	Ret	9	2*	12	11	12	6	7	13	3	5	13	7	Ret	9	4	6	8	5	7	Ret	8	7	6	5*	5	6	7	5	8	116
9	(United Kingdom) James Thompson				11	7	3	1*	**1***	6	8	7	**1***	11	9	2*	Ret	4	5	Ret	6	**6***										114
10	(United Kingdom) Andrew Jordan	Ret	5	Ret	3	18	16	**2**	Ret	11	10	6	2	8	7	4	12*	12	4	7	10	7	12	6	15	7	8	2*	4	16	Ret	114
11	(United Kingdom) Adam Jones	5	7	7	6	8	2	9	8	Ret	6	8	7	16	8	Ret	7	11	7													62
12	(United Kingdom) Paul O'Neill				5	10	**Ret**	Ret	11	16	12	9	9	9	10	**Ret***	3	5	6	9	5	9	9	10	9	9	Ret	Ret	9	7	Ret	60
13	(United Kingdom) Tom Chilton	11	14	11	15	17	Ret	12	17	9	13	12	Ret	Ret	DNS	10	11	Ret	Ret	11	11	8	11	5	Ret	18	9	**3***	**2***	6*	3	55
14	(United Kingdom) Gordon Shedden	Ret	6	5													Ret	10	12	2	9*	Ret				12	Ret	8	Ret	10	9	34
15	(United Kingdom) James Nash										11	Ret	17	13	15	Ret	NC	8	DSQ				3	Ret	8	8	7	Ret				24
16	(United Kingdom) Harry Vaulkhard	8	11	9	9	12	11	5	10	**7**	Ret	15	12	Ret	DNS	DNS	10	9	**Ret**	10	Ret	11	14	11	11	13	11	Ret	11	13	Ret	22
17	(United Kingdom) Dan Eaves	9	8	6	Ret	Ret	Ret	DNS	DNS	DNS	16	13	14	Ret	DNS	DNS																10
18	(United Kingdom) David Pinkney	15	13	Ret	14	13	10	14	12	10	15	11	Ret	10	11	Ret	8	Ret	9	Ret	Ret	12	Ret	16	10	15	13	Ret	15	14	10	10
19	(United Kingdom) Johnny Herbert																						13	8	Ret	Ret	10	7	Ret	Ret	14	8
20	(United Kingdom) Anthony Reid																						Ret	14	12	11	12	Ret	10	Ret	7	5
21	(United Kingdom) Tom Onslow-Cole													Ret	NC	Ret							Ret	13	14	14	Ret	9	13	9	12	4
22	(United Kingdom) Martin Johnson	12	Ret	13	16	16	14	11	16	12	18	16	Ret	12	12	Ret	14	15	10	12	13	13	Ret	DNS	16	16	14	10	Ret	DNS	DNS	2
23	(United Kingdom) Martyn Bell	10	12	10	13	14	13	15	15	19	17	17	15	15	13	11							15	15	18				17	Ret	Ret	2
24	(United Kingdom) Alan Morrison	13	15	12	Ret	Ret	Ret	16	13	15	14	10	10																			2
25	(United Kingdom) John George	Ret	Ret	14	18	15	Ret	17	14	17	Ret	DNS	16	14	14	12	13	16	11	13	14	14	16	17	17	17	Ret	13	16	15	Ret	0
26	(United Kingdom) Liam McMillan	14	Ret	Ret	Ret	19	Ret	13	Ret	14																						0
27	(United Kingdom) Matt Hamilton																									Ret	Ret	14	Ret	Ret	13	0
28	(United Kingdom) Nick Leason	Ret	17	15	NC	20	15	Ret	Ret	18																						0
Pos	Driver	BHI			THR			DON			OUL			CRO			SNE			KNO			SIL			ROC			BHGP			Pts
Sources:

- Note: **bold** signifies pole position (1 point given in first race only, and race 2 and 3 poles are based on race results), italics signifies fastest lap (1 point given all races) and * signifies at least one lap in the lead (1 point given all races).

=== Manufacturers/Constructors Championship ===
Pos	Manufacturer / Constructor	BHI			THR			DON			OUL			CRO			SNE			KNO			SIL			ROC			BHGP			Pts
1	Vauxhall / VX Racing	1	3	3	1	2	7	3	2	5	4	2	3	5	5	1	1	1	2	6	1	3	5	2	5	6	3	11	3	2	4	**658***
1	Vauxhall / VX Racing	2	16	Ret	2	3	8	8	3	8	7	4	6	6	6	4	9	12	3	Ret	4	4	10	Ret	13	Ret	NC	Ret	4	16	Ret	**658***
2	Honda / Team Dynamics	15	6	5	11	7	3	1	1	6	8	7	1	10	9	2	8	4	5	Ret	6	6	12	8	10	15	10	7	15	14	10	**429**
2	Honda / Team Dynamics	Ret	13	Ret	14	13	10	14	12	10	15	11	Ret	11	11	Ret	Ret	Ret	9	Ret	Ret	12	Ret	16	Ret	Ret	13	Ret	Ret	Ret	14	**429**
3	Ford / Team Aon	11	14	11	15	17	Ret	12	13	9	13	10	10	Ret	NC	10	11	Ret	Ret	11	11	8	11	5	14	14	9	3	2	6	3	**341**
3	Ford / Team Aon	13	15	12	Ret	Ret	Ret	16	17	15	14	12	Ret	Ret	DNS	Ret							Ret	13	Ret	18	Ret	9	13	9	12	**341**
Pos	Manufacturer / Constructor	BHI			THR			DON			OUL			CRO			SNE			KNO			SIL			ROC			BHGP			Pts

- * Vauxhall penalised 10 points for exceeding engine limit.

=== Teams Championship ===
Pos	Team	BHI			THR			DON			OUL			CRO			SNE			KNO			SIL			ROC			BHGP			Pts
1	VX Racing	1	3	3	1	2	7	2	2	5	4	2	2	5	5	1	1	1	2	6	1	3	5	2	5	6	3	2	3	2	4	**466***
1	VX Racing	2	5	Ret	2	3	8	3	3	8	7	4	3	6	6	4	9	12	3	7	4	4	10	6	13	7	8	11	4	8	5	**466***
2	Team RAC	3	2	4	4	1	6	Ret	5	2	1	1	11	1	1	3	5	2	1	4	3	5	4	4	3	1	4	1	8	3	2	**404**
2	Team RAC	7	4	Ret	7	4	9	Ret	DNS	DNS	5	14	Ret	2	2	6	6	13	Ret	8	8	10	7	12	4	10	6	4	10	11	6	**404**
3	Racing Silverline				10	6	4	7	4	3	2	3	5	3	3	5	2	3	13	1	2	1	1	1	1	2	1	5	1	1	1	**358***
3	Racing Silverline							10	6	4	19	Ret	8	Ret	DNS	DNS	Ret	NC	DNS	3	Ret	2	2	3	7	3	2	12	12	12	11	**358***
4	Airwaves BMW	4	1	2	12	5	5	4	7	1	3	5	4	4	4	7	4	6	8	5	7	Ret	6	7	2	4	5	6	6	4	8	**255**
4	Airwaves BMW	Ret	9	8	17	11	12	6	9	13	9	Ret	13	7	Ret	9	Ret	7	Ret	Ret	12	Ret	8	9	6	5	Ret	Ret	7	5	Ret	**255**
5	Team Dynamics	15	6	5	11	7	3	1	1	6	8	7	1	10	9	2	8	4	5	Ret	6	6	13	8	10	15	10	7	15	14	10	**149**
5	Team Dynamics	Ret	13	Ret	14	13	10	14	12	10	15	11	Ret	11	11	Ret	Ret	Ret	9	Ret	Ret	12	Ret	16	Ret	Ret	13	Ret	Ret	Ret	14	**149**
6	Clyde Valley Racing	5	7	6	6	8	2	9	8	Ret	6	8	7	16	8	Ret	7	10	7	2	9	Ret										**93**
6	Clyde Valley Racing	9	8	7	Ret	Ret	Ret	DNS	DNS	DNS	16	13	14	Ret	DNS	DNS	Ret	11	12													**93**
7	Tech-Speed Motorsport	10	12	10	5	10	13	15	11	16	12	9	9	9	10	11	3	5	6	9	5	9	9	10	9	9	Ret	Ret	9	7	Ret	**70**
7	Tech-Speed Motorsport				13	14	Ret	Ret	15	19	17	17	15	15	13	Ret							15	15	18				17	Ret	Ret	**70**
8	RML	6	10	1	8	9	1				11	Ret	17	13	15	Ret	NC	8	DSQ				3	Ret	8	8	7	Ret				**66**
9	Team Aon	11	14	11	15	17	Ret	12	13	9	13	10	10	Ret	NC	10	11	Ret	Ret	11	11	8	11	5	14	14	9	3	2	6	3	**62**
9	Team Aon	13	15	12	Ret	Ret	Ret	16	17	15	14	12	Ret	Ret	DNS	Ret							Ret	13	Ret	18	Ret	9	13	9	12	**62**
10	Tempus Sport	8	11	9	9	12	11	5	10	7	Ret	15	12	Ret	DNS	DNS																**9***
11	Club SEAT																									12	Ret	8	Ret	10	9	**7**
12	bamboo engineering																10	9	Ret	10	Ret	11	14	11	11	13	11	Ret	11	13	Ret	**6**
13	Boulevard Team Racing	12	Ret	13	16	16	14	11	16	12	18	16	Ret	12	12	Ret	14	15	10	12	13	13	Ret	DNS	16	16	14	10	Ret	DNS	DNS	**4**
14	TH Motorsport w/ JAG	Ret	Ret	14	18	15	Ret	17	14	17	Ret	DNS	16	14	14	12	13	16	11	13	14	14	16	17	17	17	Ret	13	16	15	Ret	**1**
15	Maxtreme	14	Ret	Ret	Ret	19	Ret	13	Ret	14																						**0**
16	TH Motorsport w/ Inten																									Ret	Ret	14	Ret	Ret	13	**0**
17	AFM Racing	Ret	17	15	NC	20	15	Ret	Ret	18																						**0**
Pos	Team	BHI			THR			DON			OUL			CRO			SNE			KNO			SIL			ROC			BHGP			Pts

- * VX Racing, Racing Silverline and Tempus Sport penalised 10 points for exceeding engine limit.

=== Independents Trophy ===
Pos	Driver	BHI			THR			DON			OUL			CRO			SNE			KNO			SIL			ROC			BHGP			Pts
1	(United Kingdom) Colin Turkington	3	**2**	4	4	**1**	9	Ret	5	2	1	**1**	11	**1**	**1**	6	5	2	1	4	3	5	4	4	3	10	4	4	8	3	2	313
2	(United Kingdom) Jason Plato	6	10	**1**	**10**	6	4	7	4	3	**2**	3	5	3	3	5	**Ret**	3	13	**1**	**Ret**	2	2	1	7	**2**	1	12	1	**1**	1	283
3	(United Kingdom) Mat Jackson				8	9	1	10	6	4	19	Ret	8	Ret	DNS	DNS	2	**NC**	DNS	3	2	1	**1**	**3**	1	3	2	5	12	12	11	183
4	(United Kingdom) Rob Collard	**4**	1	8	17	5	5	4	9	1	9	Ret	4	4	4	7	Ret	7	Ret	Ret	12	Ret	6	9	**2**	4	Ret	Ret	6	4	Ret	173
5	(United Kingdom) Stephen Jelley	7	4	Ret	7	4	6	Ret	DNS	DNS	5	14	Ret	2	2	3	6	13	Ret	8	8	10	7	12	4	1	**6**	1	14	11	6	165
6	(United Kingdom) Jonathan Adam	Ret	9	2	12	11	12	6	7	13	3	5	13	7	Ret	9	4	6	8	5	7	Ret	8	7	6	5	5	6	7	5	8	159
7	(United Kingdom) James Thompson				11	7	3	1	**1**	6	8	7	**1**	11	9	2	Ret	4	5	Ret	6	**6**										144
8	(United Kingdom) Paul O'Neill				5	10	**Ret**	Ret	11	16	12	9	9	9	10	**Ret**	3	5	6	9	5	9	9	10	9	9	Ret	Ret	9	7	**Ret**	110
9	(United Kingdom) Adam Jones	5	7	7	6	8	2	9	8	Ret	6	8	7	16	8	Ret	7	11	7													98
10	(United Kingdom) Tom Chilton	11	14	11	15	17	Ret	12	17	9	13	12	Ret	Ret	DNS	10	11	Ret	Ret	11	11	8	11	5	Ret	18	9	**3**	**2**	6	3	83
11	(United Kingdom) Harry Vaulkhard	8	11	9	9	12	11	**5**	10	**7**	Ret	15	12	Ret	DNS	DNS	10	9	**Ret**	10	Ret	11	14	11	11	13	11	Ret	11	13	Ret	58
12	(United Kingdom) Gordon Shedden	Ret	6	5													Ret	10	12	2	9	Ret				12	Ret	8	Ret	10	9	48
13	(United Kingdom) David Pinkney	15	13	Ret	14	13	10	14	12	10	15	11	Ret	10	11	Ret	8	Ret	9	Ret	Ret	12	Ret	16	10	15	13	Ret	15	14	10	33
14	(United Kingdom) James Nash										11	Ret	17	13	15	Ret	NC	8	DSQ				3	Ret	8	8	7	Ret				32
15	(United Kingdom) Martin Johnson	12	Ret	13	16	16	14	11	16	12	18	16	Ret	12	12	Ret	14	15	10	12	13	13	Ret	DNS	16	16	14	10	Ret	DNS	DNS	19
16	(United Kingdom) Dan Eaves	9	8	6	Ret	Ret	Ret	DNS	DNS	DNS	16	13	14	Ret	DNS	DNS																16
17	(United Kingdom) Johnny Herbert																						13	8	Ret	Ret	10	7	Ret	Ret	14	14
18	(United Kingdom) Anthony Reid																						Ret	14	12	11	12	Ret	10	Ret	7	13
19	(United Kingdom) Martyn Bell	10	12	10	13	14	13	15	15	19	17	17	15	15	13	11							15	15	18				17	Ret	Ret	11
20	(United Kingdom) Tom Onslow-Cole													Ret	NC	Ret							Ret	13	14	14	Ret	9	13	9	12	9
21	(United Kingdom) Alan Morrison	13	15	12	Ret	Ret	Ret	16	13	15	14	10	10																			8
22	(United Kingdom) John George	Ret	Ret	14	18	15	Ret	17	14	17	Ret	DNS	16	14	14	12	13	16	11	13	14	14	16	17	17	17	Ret	13	16	15	Ret	6
23	(United Kingdom) Liam McMillan	14	Ret	Ret	Ret	19	Ret	13	Ret	14																						1
24	(United Kingdom) Matt Hamilton																									Ret	Ret	14	Ret	Ret	13	0
25	(United Kingdom) Nick Leason	Ret	17	15	NC	20	15	Ret	Ret	18																						0
Pos	Driver	BHI			THR			DON			OUL			CRO			SNE			KNO			SIL			ROC			BHGP			Pts

=== Independent Teams Trophy ===
Pos	Team	BHI			THR			DON			OUL			CRO			SNE			KNO			SIL			ROC			BHGP			Pts
1	Team RAC	3	2	4	3	1	6	Ret	5	2	1	1	11	1	1	3	5	2	1	4	3	5	4	4	3	1	4	1	8	3	2	**348**
2	Racing Silverline				10	6	4	7	4	3	2	3	5	3	3	5	2	3	13	1	2	1	1	1	1	2	1	5	1	1	1	**313***
3	Airwaves BMW	4	1	2	12	5	5	4	7	1	3	5	4	4	4	7	4	6	8	5	7	Ret	6	7	2	4	5	6	6	4	8	**275**
4	Team Dynamics	15	6	5	11	7	3	1	1	6	8	7	1	10	9	2	8	4	5	Ret	6	6	13	8	10	15	10	7	15	14	10	**220**
5	Tech-Speed Motorsport	10	12	10	5	10	13	15	11	16	12	9	9	9	10	11	3	5	6	9	5	9	9	10	9	9	Ret	Ret	9	7	Ret	**159**
6	Team Aon	11	14	11	15	17	Ret	12	13	9	13	10	10	Ret	NC	10	11	Ret	Ret	11	11	8	11	5	14	14	9	3	2	6	3	**130**
7	Clyde Valley Racing	5	7	6	6	8	2	9	8	Ret	6	8	7	16	8	Ret	7	10	7	2	9	Ret										**124**
8	RML	6	10	1	8	9	1				11	Ret	17	13	15	Ret	NC	8	DSQ				3	Ret	8	8	7	Ret				**110**
9	Boulevard Team Racing	12	Ret	13	16	16	14	11	16	12	18	16	Ret	12	12	Ret	14	15	10	12	13	13	Ret	DNS	16	16	14	10	Ret	DNS	DNS	**61**
10	TH Motorsport w/ JAG	Ret	Ret	14	18	15	Ret	17	14	17	Ret	DNS	16	14	14	12	13	16	11	13	14	14	16	17	17	17	Ret	13	16	15	Ret	**47**
11	Tempus Sport	8	11	9	9	12	11	5	10	7	Ret	15	12	Ret	DNS	DNS																**46***
12	bamboo engineering																10	9	Ret	10	Ret	11	14	11	11	13	11	Ret	11	13	Ret	**46**
13	Club SEAT																									12	Ret	8	Ret	10	9	**21**
14	Maxtreme	14	Ret	Ret	Ret	19	Ret	13	Ret	14																						**8**
15	TH Motorsport w/ Inten																									Ret	Ret	14	Ret	Ret	13	**6**
16	AFM Racing	Ret	17	15	NC	20	15	Ret	Ret	18																						**3**
Pos	Team	BHI			THR			DON			OUL			CRO			SNE			KNO			SIL			ROC			BHGP			Pts

- * Racing Silverline and Tempus Sport penalised 10 points for exceeding engine limit.
