= Gordon Shedden =

British racing driver (born 1979)

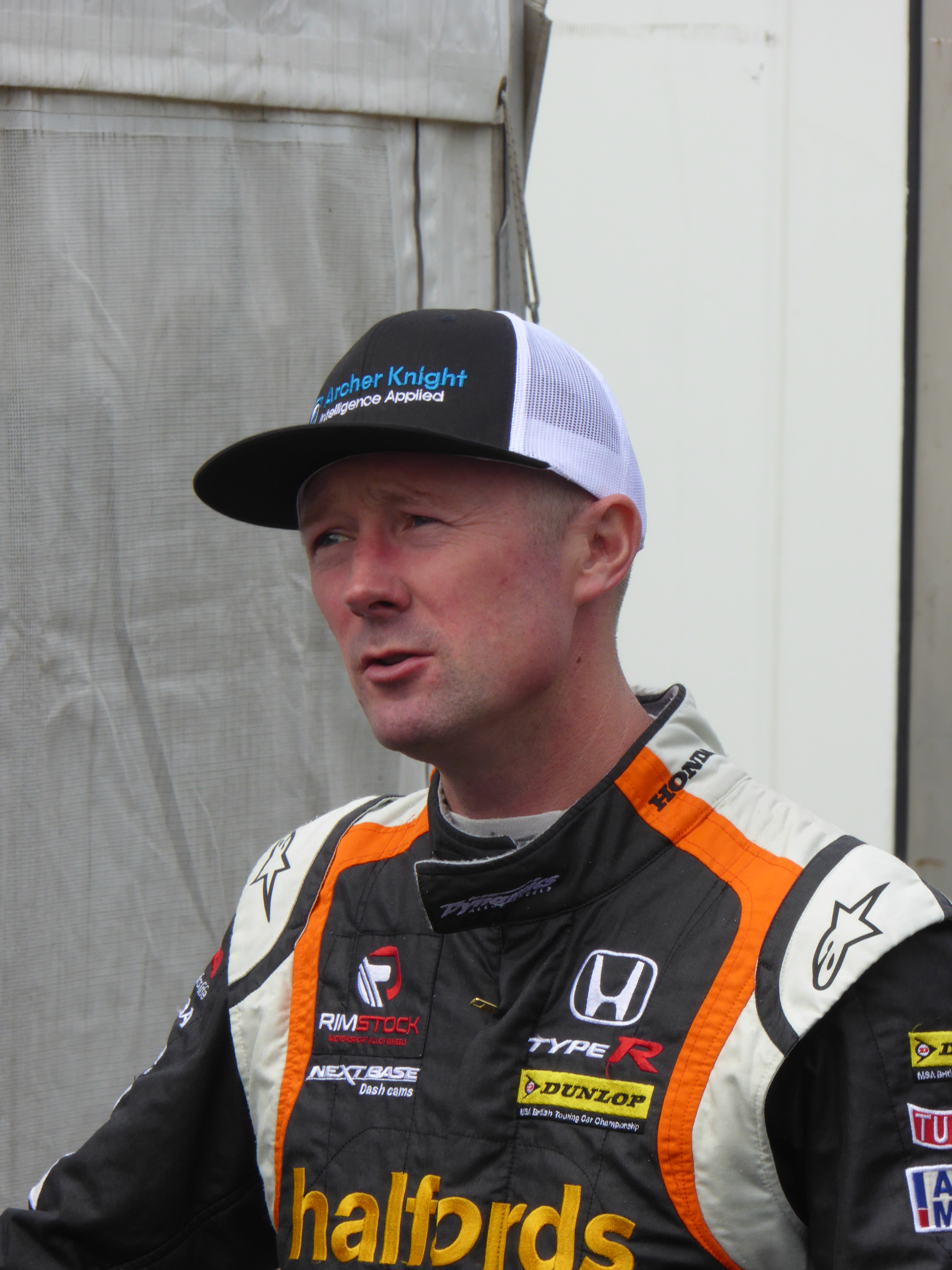
- Shedden at the Knockhill round of the 2017 British Touring Car Championship.
- Nationality: (United Kingdom) British
- Born: Gordon William Shedden; 15 February 1979 (age 47) Edinburgh, Scotland
- Relatives: Rory Butcher (brother-in-law)

World Touring Car Cup career
- Debut season: 2018
- Current team: Audi Sport Leopard Lukoil Team
- Categorisation: FIA Gold
- Car number: 52
- Starts: 57
- Wins: 1
- Poles: 1
- Fastest laps: 0
- Best finish: 13th in 2018

Previous series
- 2017 2011 2008 2005 2003–04 2001, 2006–17 2000 2000 2000: TCR International Series; British GT Championship; FIA GT Championship; Porsche Carrera Cup Great Britain; SEAT Cupra Championship; British Touring Car Championship; Dutch Touring Cars; Ford Fiesta Championship; National Saloon Cup Great Britain

Championship titles
- 2012, 2015–16 2000: British Touring Car Championship; Ford Fiesta Championship

Awards
- 2012, 2015–16: Autosport National Driver of the Year

Gordon William Shedden (born 15 February 1979) is a British racing driver who is set to compete in the British Touring Car Championship for Laser Tools Racing with MB Motorsport. He has previously won the series on three occasions; in 2012, 2015 and 2016, driving for Honda/Team Dynamics each time. He also spent two seasons in the FIA WTCR, from 2018 to 2019, driving for the Audi Sport Leopard Lukoil Team.

== Racing career ==
=== Early years ===
Born in Edinburgh, Shedden began racing in the Ford Fiesta Championship in 1999 with Tim Norton Motor Services Ltd. Racing Team, www.timnortonnmotors.co.uk, and won it the following season with nine wins. He raced in the SEAT Cupra Championship, finishing as runner-up in 2003 and fourth in 2004. He also made a one-off appearance in the Production Class of the BTCC at Knockhill in 2001, and at the same circuit in the Porsche Carrera Cup Great Britain in 2005.

Shedden was entered in the 2002 BTCC by GR Motorsport in an Alfa Romeo, but this never reached the track. (http://www.touringcarregister.com/register/492/)

Shedden has worked as Business Development Manager for the Knockhill circuit, alongside his wife Jillian. He has raced at Macau several times.

=== British Touring Car Championship ===
==== Team Dynamics (2006–2009) ====
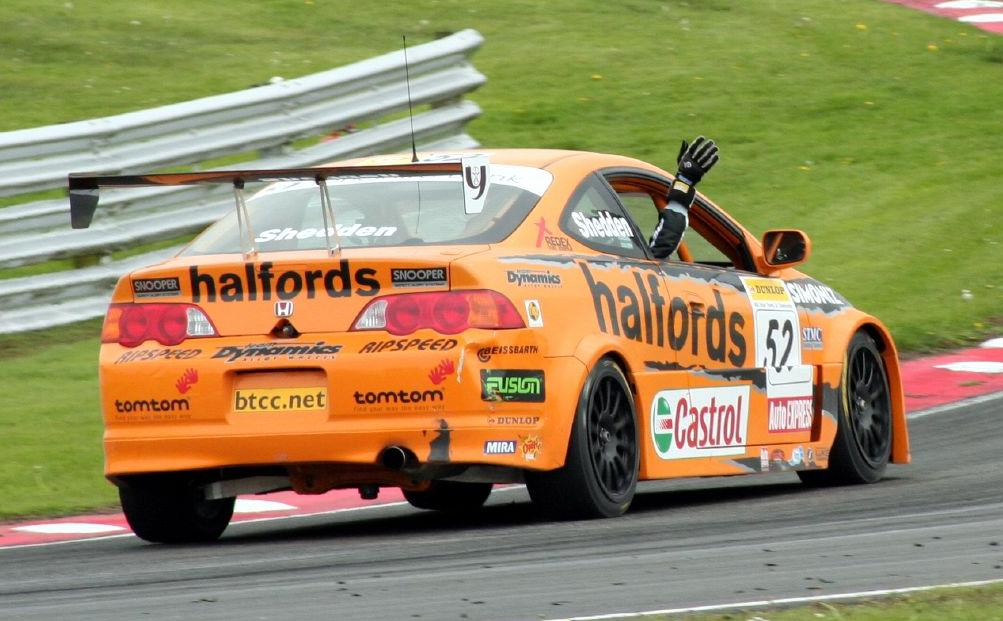
Shedden celebrates his first BTCC win at Oulton Park in 2006.

For 2006, Shedden was chosen by Team Halfords to drive for them in the BTCC, alongside reigning series champion Matt Neal, noting that "it's brilliant to have a teammate that I can learn so much from". He took his first win in the series in race 7 at Oulton Park, and added another in round 10 at Thruxton, where he also took his first pole position. He finished fourth overall with five wins in 2006, finishing the season as rookie of the year. In 2007, his team switched to the Honda Civic, and again took four wins. He was again fourth overall ahead of Neal.

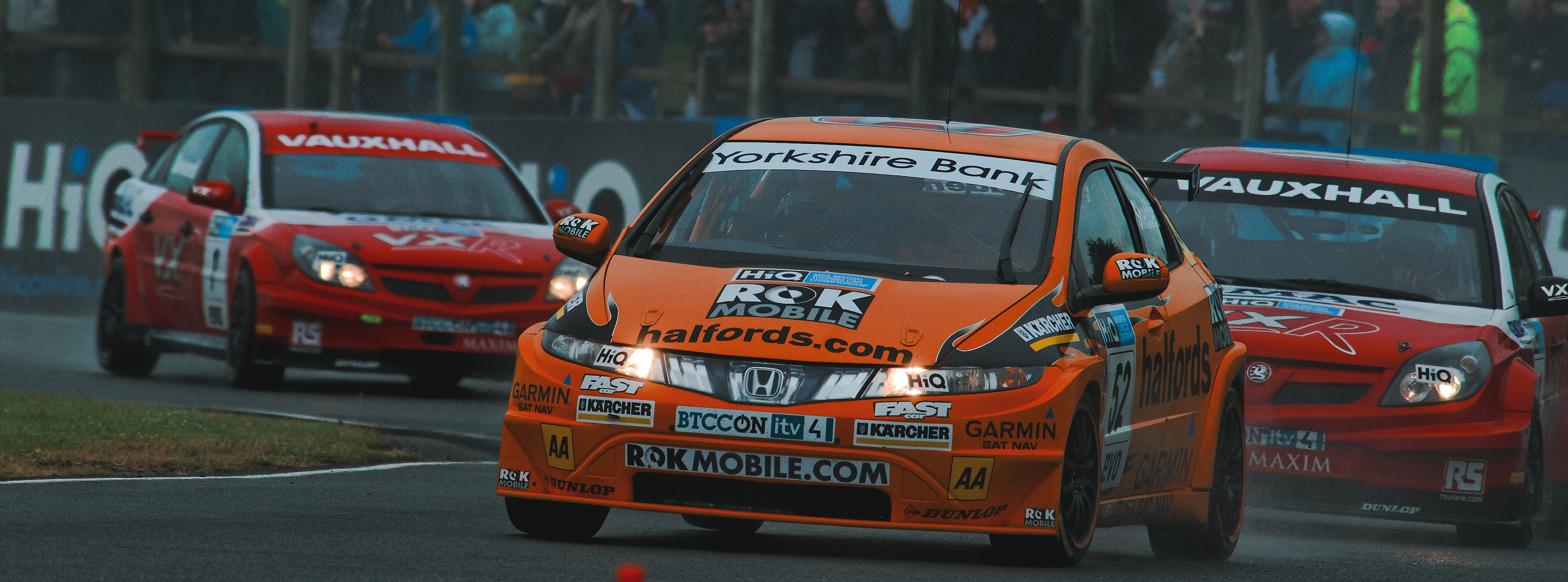
Shedden's Civic leads two of the VX Racing Vauxhalls at the Croft round of the 2008 British Touring Car Championship season.

In 2008, Shedden was the team leader alongside Tom Chilton, with Neal leaving to join VX Racing. He took a second place in the season opener, but crashed heavily in race 3. He did not achieve a podium finish at Donington Park, and at Thruxton he led races 1 and 3, but suffered punctures on lap 8 of both races. He was placed in seventh in the Drivers Championship.

2009 saw Shedden joined at Team Dynamics (previously Team Halfords) by former Luton Town F.C. Chairman, David Pinkney. He also took on a new role as Team Ambassador for new racing team, YourRacingCar.com who contested their first year together in the BTCC support series, the Ginetta G50 Cup. He was ranked ninth in the Drivers Standings but was later replaced by James Thompson.

==== CVR and GR Asia (2009) ====
On 15 April 2009, it was announced that James Thompson would be replacing Shedden in the Team Dynamics car for the remainder of the 2009 season. The team said it was working on funds for a third car for Gordon to run later in the season. However, before the round at Snetterton, Shedden was signed by Clyde Valley Racing. After competing at two events for the team, they withdrew from the rest of the season. After missing the Silverstone round, Shedden rejoined the series at the penultimate round with the same bio-ethanol SEAT León that he raced for CVR, under the Club SEAT banner. Despite all the changes, Shedden managed two podiums during 2009 and finished up in 12th in the Drivers Standings.

==== Honda Racing (2010–2017) ====
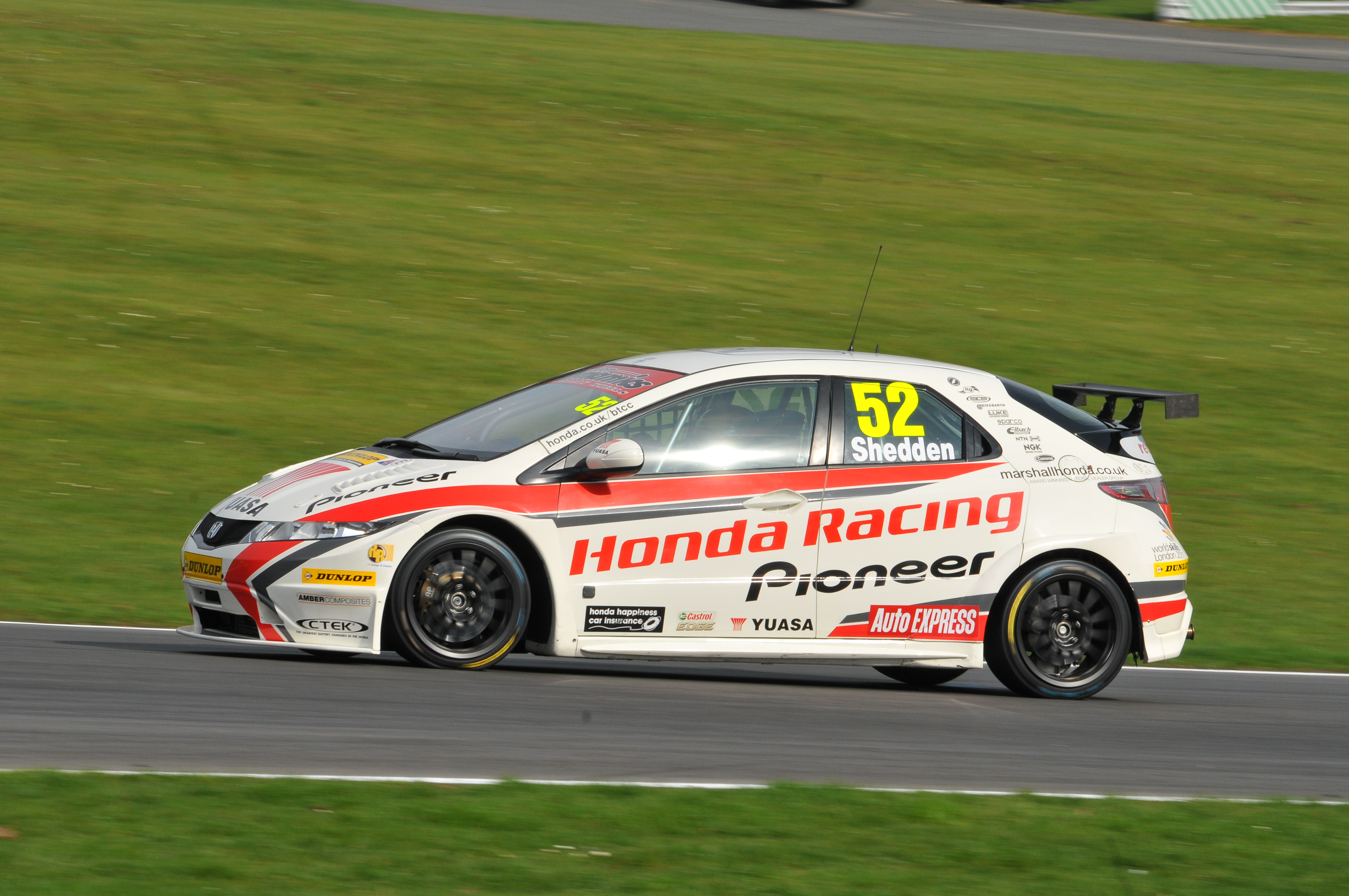
Shedden driving for Honda Racing at Brands Hatch in the 2011 BTCC season.

After Team Dynamics became an official manufacturer Honda team ahead of the 2010 season, Shedden and Neal were re-signed by the team. Shedden secured pole position for the first race of the season at Thruxton, he led the opening race but suffered a 125 mph shunt as a result of a puncture. Shedden won two races at Croft Circuit followed by wins at Snetterton, Knockhill and Donington and finished third in the Drivers Championship.

Shedden remained with Honda for the 2011 season with the Honda Civic now powered by an NGTC turbocharged engine. He finished the drivers championship in second place, eight points behind his team mate Matt Neal having been his only title challenger at the penultimate race of the season.

Shedden stayed with Honda in 2012, driving the new full-NGTC Honda Civic. His teammate would Matt Neal for the third year in a row. He had a disappointing opening round at Brands Hatch, his car was plagued with electrical problems for much of the weekend. He was disqualified from the third race of the day after his team worked on his car during the red flag period. Things improved at the next round where Shedden took two wins from three races, including one inherited due to penalties for Mat Jackson and Jason Plato. Problems for Plato at Oulton Park and good results put him in the championship lead after the first race. He was second in the championship going into the summer break, one point behind team-mate Neal. When the season resumed at Snetterton, Shedden's car caught fire in the first free practice session. Shedden finished third in race three but post-race scrutineering found that his Honda had been over-boosting, thus disqualifying him from the results. He won two of the three races at Rockingham in wet conditions where he regained the championship lead. Shedden secured his first BTCC title in race two at Brands Hatch, finishing second behind Aron Smith.

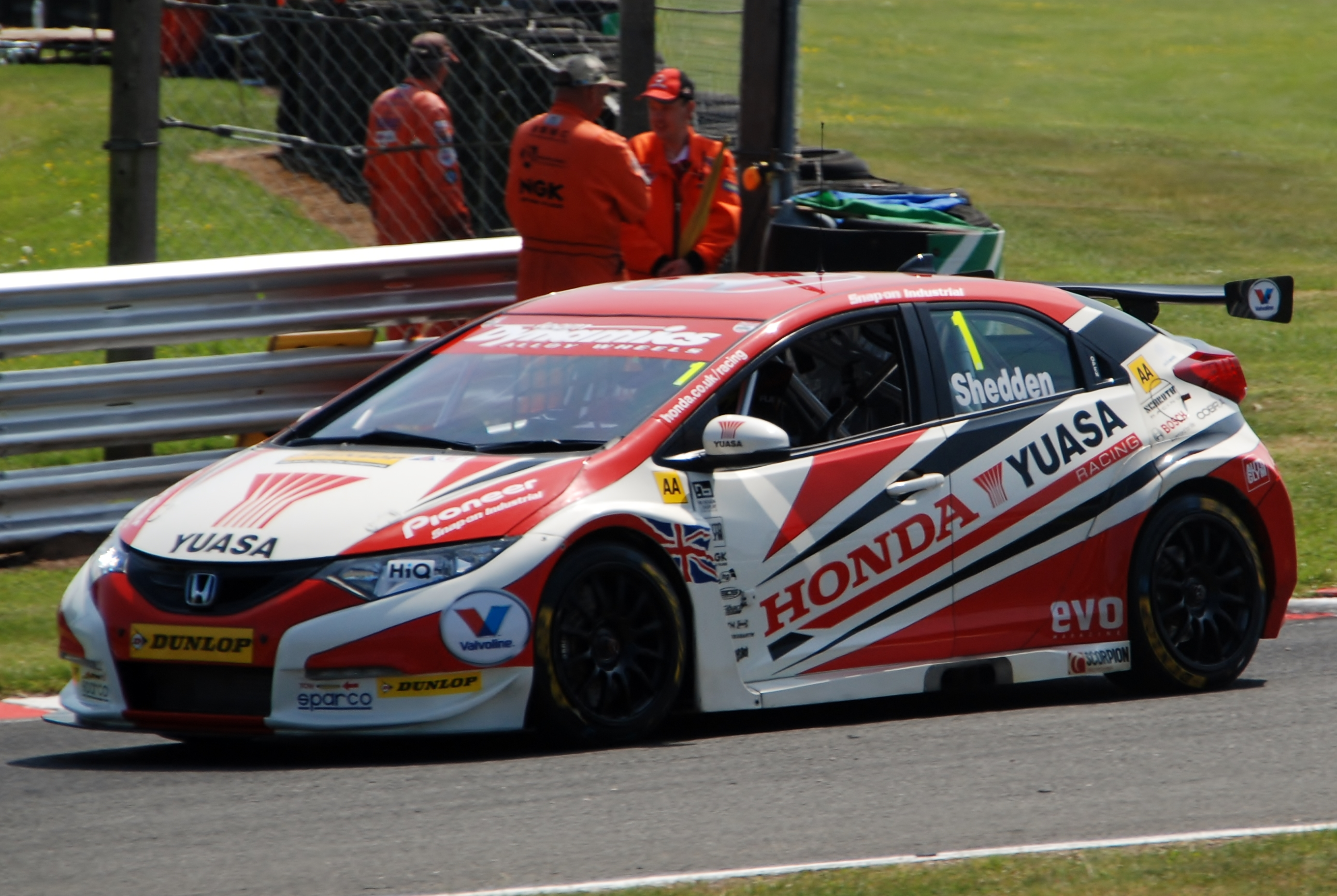
Shedden driving for Honda at Oulton Park during the 2013 British Touring Car Championship season.

The Honda team retained Shedden and Neal for 2013 in a pair of Honda Civics. He was excluded from the second race at the season opening Brands Hatch round having failed the ride height test, elevating Jeff Smith to the final podium spot. He went on to finish second in the standings, just seven points away from retaining his crown.

2014 saw the Honda team make the switch to run the new Honda tourer model for a year. It happened to be fairly unsuccessful however. Shedden managed two wins, eight podiums and finished up third in the drivers championship.

For 2015, the team ran a pair of brand new Honda Type Rs. Shedden took the cars first win in just the second race of the season. Shedden took the title by just 4 points from Jason Plato and thus his second drivers title.

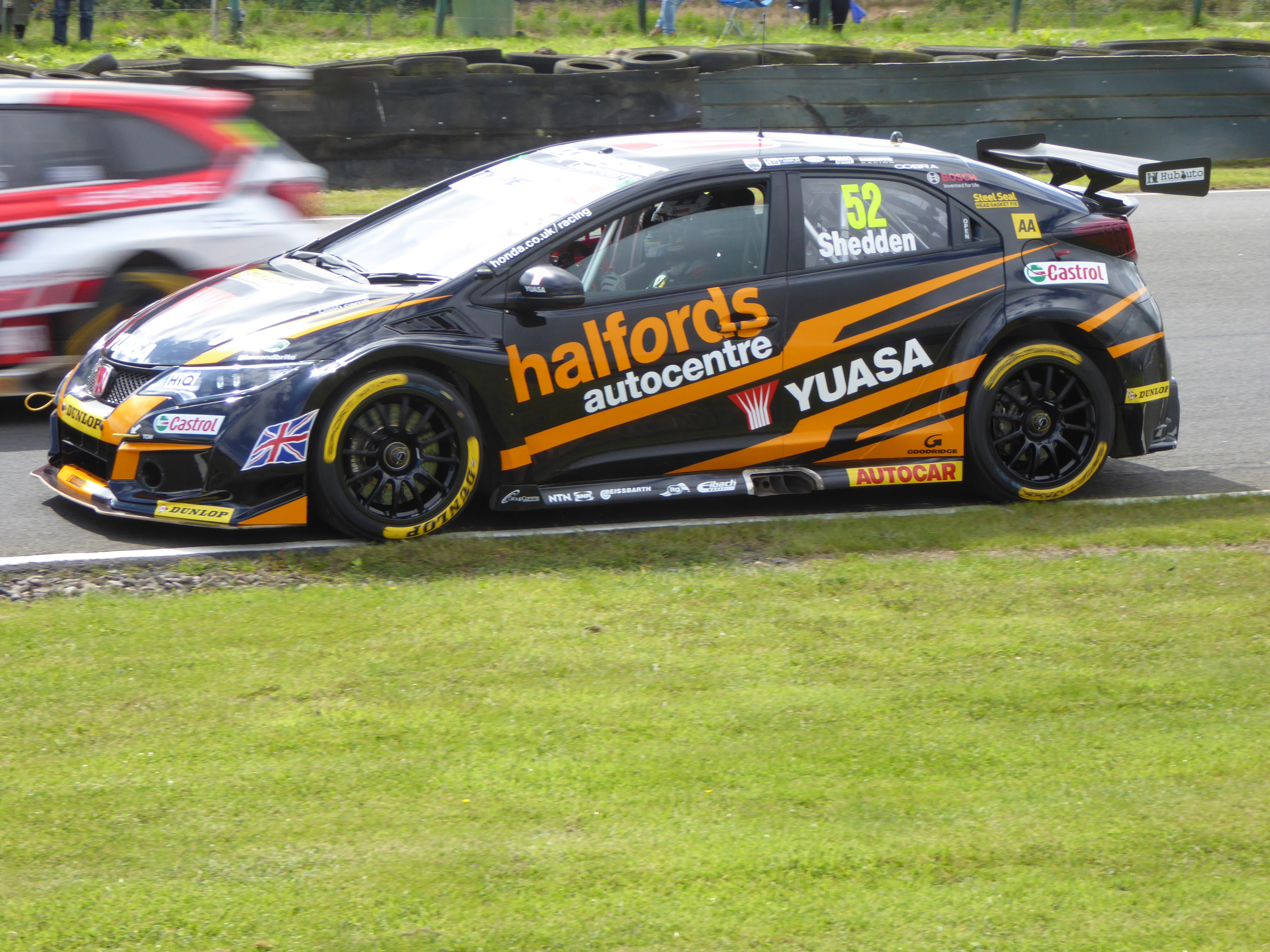
Shedden, at the Knockhill round of the 2017 British Touring Car Championship.

Halfords returned as the team's main sponsor for 2016, a full ten years since they took Matt Neal to his second drivers title. Shedden hit the ground running with a win at the first round. However, a lean spell mid season due to some bad luck saw Shedden sitting ninth in the standings at the halfway point. In the second half of the season. Shedden would take three wins and four podiums to claw back the points deficit to BMW's Sam Tordoff. In the last race of the season, Shedden overtook Tordoff to clinch his third championship title. Shedden became the first man to successfully defend his crown since Fabrizio Giovanardi in 2008.

=== World Touring Car Cup ===
==== Audi Sport WRT (2018–2019) ====
In January 2018, Shedden announced his departure from Team Dynamics, stating he was moving onto “pastures new”. It was later announced that he would switch to the World Touring Car Cup championship, driving for the W Racing Team Audi works team. In December 2019, the WRT team announced it would not be running in 2020 in the World Touring Cup, leaving Shedden without a seat.

== Top Gear ==
Shedden has made multiple appearances on Top Gear. His first appearance came in Series 12, Episode 5, where he drove a Mercedes-Benz O305G Articulated bus in a bus race. In Series 14, Episode 4, he drove an articulated bus in the airport vehicles race. In series 20, episode 2, he participated in and won a taxi race driving a Hindustan Ambassador.

== Racing record ==
=== Complete British Touring Car Championship results ===
(key) Races in bold indicate pole position (1 point awarded – 2001 all races, 2006–present just in first race, 2001 in class) Races in italics indicate fastest lap (1 point awarded – 2001–present all races, 2001 in class) * signifies that driver lead race for at least one lap (1 point given – 2001–present all races; ^{Superscript} number indicates points-scoring qualifying race position)

| Year | Team | Car | Class | 1 | 2 | 3 | 4 | 5 | 6 | 7 | 8 | 9 | 10 | 11 | 12 | 13 | 14 | 15 | 16 | 17 | 18 | 19 | 20 | 21 | 22 | 23 | 24 | 25 | 26 | 27 | 28 | 29 | 30 | DC | Points | Class |
|---|---|---|---|---|---|---|---|---|---|---|---|---|---|---|---|---|---|---|---|---|---|---|---|---|---|---|---|---|---|---|---|---|---|---|---|---|
| 2001 | GR Motorsport | Ford Focus | P | BRH; 1 | BRH; 2 | THR; 1 | THR; 2 | OUL; 1 | OUL; 2 | SIL; 1 | SIL; 2 | MON; 1 | MON; 2 | DON; 1 | DON; 2 | **KNO**; **1**; 3 | **KNO**; **2**; 5 | SNE; 1 | SNE; 2 | CRO; 1 | CRO; 2 | OUL; 1 | OUL; 2 | SIL; 1 | SIL; 2 | DON; 1 | DON; 2 | BRH; 1 | BRH; 2 | | | | | N/A | 30 | 15th |
| 2006 | Team Halfords | Honda Integra Type-R | | BRH; 1 Ret | BRH; 2 Ret | BRH; 3; 4 | MON; 1; 5 | MON; 2 DSQ | MON; 3; 6 | OUL; 1; 1* | **OUL**; **2**; 3 | OUL; 3 Ret | **THR**; **1**; 1* | **THR**; **2**; 2 | THR; 3; 11 | CRO; 1; 12 | CRO; 2; 4 | CRO; 3; 17 | **DON**; **1**; 1* | **DON**; **2**; 1* | DON; 3; 3 | SNE; 1 Ret | SNE; 2; 6 | SNE; 3; 5 | KNO; 1; 6 | KNO; 2 Ret | KNO; 3; 2* | BRH; 1; 7 | BRH; 2; 4 | BRH; 3; 2 | SIL; 1; 6 | SIL; 2; 2 | SIL; 3 Ret | 4th | 204 | |
| 2007 | Team Halfords | Honda Civic | | BRH; 1; 8 | BRH; 2 Ret | BRH; 3 Ret | ROC; 1; 4 | ROC; 2 Ret | ROC; 3; 6 | THR; 1 Ret | THR; 2; 8 | THR; 3; 2 | **CRO**; **1**; 2 | CRO; 2 Ret* | CRO; 3; 4 | OUL; 1; 1* | **OUL**; **2** Ret | OUL; 3; 4 | **DON**; **1**; 1* | **DON**; **2**; 2* | DON; 3; 5 | SNE; 1; 1* | **SNE**; **2** Ret* | SNE; 3; 5 | BRH; 1 Ret | BRH; 2; 3 | BRH; 3; 2 | KNO; 1 Ret | KNO; 2; 4 | KNO; 3; 1* | THR; 1; 3 | THR; 2 Ret | THR; 3; 9 | **3rd** | **200** | |
| 2008 | Team Halfords | Honda Civic | | BRH; 1; 6 | BRH; 2; 2 | BRH; 3 Ret | **ROC**; **1**; 1* | **ROC**; **2**; 4 | ROC; 3; 4 | DON; 1; 4 | DON; 2; 9* | **DON**; **3**; 10 | THR; 1; 13* | THR; 2; 8 | THR; 3; 17* | CRO; 1; 3* | CRO; 2 Ret | CRO; 3; 6 | SNE; 1; 4 | SNE; 2; 8 | **SNE**; **3** Ret | OUL; 1; 7 | OUL; 2; 8 | OUL; 3; 1* | KNO; 1; 4 | KNO; 2; 4 | KNO; 3; 8 | SIL; 1; 13 | SIL; 2; 8 | SIL; 3; 11 | BRH; 1; 13 | BRH; 2; 9 | BRH; 3; 9 | 7th | 144 | |
| 2009 | Team Dynamics | Honda Civic | | BRH; 1 Ret | BRH; 2; 6 | BRH; 3; 5 | THR; 1 | THR; 2 | THR; 3 | DON; 1 | DON; 2 | DON; 3 | OUL; 1 | OUL; 2 | OUL; 3 | CRO; 1 | CRO; 2 | CRO; 3 | | | | | | | | | | | | | | | | 14th | 34 | |
| 2009 | Cartridge World Carbon Zero Racing | SEAT León | | | | | | | | | | | | | | | | | SNE; 1 Ret | SNE; 2; 10 | SNE; 3; 12 | KNO; 1; 2 | KNO; 2; 9* | KNO; 3 Ret | SIL; 1 | SIL; 2 | SIL; 3 | | | | | | | 14th | 34 | |
| 2009 | Club SEAT | SEAT León | | | | | | | | | | | | | | | | | | | | | | | | | | ROC; 1; 12 | ROC; 2 Ret | ROC; 3; 8 | BRH; 1 Ret | BRH; 2; 10 | BRH; 3; 9 | 14th | 34 | |
| 2010 | Honda Racing Team | Honda Civic | | **THR**; **1** Ret* | THR; 2; 11 | THR; 3; 4 | ROC; 1; 2 | ROC; 2; 13 | ROC; 3 Ret | BRH; 1; 2 | BRH; 2; 2* | BRH; 3; 9 | OUL; 1; 2 | OUL; 2 Ret | OUL; 3; 10 | CRO; 1; 1* | **CRO**; **2**; 1* | CRO; 3; 9 | SNE; 1; 4 | SNE; 2; 8 | SNE; 3; 1* | SIL; 1; 10 | SIL; 2; 7 | SIL; 3; 5 | KNO; 1; 1* | **KNO**; **2**; 2* | KNO; 3; 9 | DON; 1; 1* | **DON**; **2**; 2* | DON; 3; 6 | BRH; 1; 2 | BRH; 2 NC | BRH; 3; 8 | **3rd** | **218** | |
| 2011 | Honda Racing Team | Honda Civic | | BRH; 1; 6 | BRH; 2; 2 | BRH; 3; 4 | DON; 1 DSQ | DON; 2; 6 | DON; 3 Ret | **THR**; **1**; 1* | **THR**; **2**; 2* | THR; 3; 6 | **OUL**; **1**; 1* | **OUL**; **2**; 6* | OUL; 3; 2 | CRO; 1; 5 | CRO; 2; 4 | CRO; 3; 6 | SNE; 1; 3 | SNE; 2; 1* | SNE; 3; 7 | KNO; 1; 3 | KNO; 2; 1* | KNO; 3; 5 | ROC; 1; 6 | ROC; 2; 1* | ROC; 3; 21 | BRH; 1; 19 | BRH; 2; 8 | BRH; 3; 2* | SIL; 1; 2 | SIL; 2; 1* | SIL; 3; 10 | **2nd** | **249** | |
| 2012 | Honda Yuasa Racing Team | Honda Civic | | BRH; 1; 5 | BRH; 2 Ret | BRH; 3 DSQ | DON; 1; 2 | DON; 2; 1* | DON; 3; 1* | THR; 1; 6 | THR; 2; 1* | THR; 3; 1* | OUL; 1; 4 | OUL; 2; 1* | OUL; 3; 4 | CRO; 1; 3* | CRO; 2; 1* | CRO; 3; 6 | SNE; 1; 7 | SNE; 2; 2 | SNE; 3 DSQ | KNO; 1; 3 | KNO; 2; 3 | KNO; 3 Ret | ROC; 1; 3 | ROC; 2; 1* | ROC; 3; 1* | SIL; 1; 7 | SIL; 2; 7 | SIL; 3; 6 | BRH; 1; 5 | BRH; 2; 2 | BRH; 3; 3 | **1st** | **408** | |
| 2013 | Honda Yuasa Racing Team | Honda Civic | | BRH; 1; 19 | BRH; 2 DSQ | BRH; 3; 2 | **DON**; **1**; 1* | **DON**; **2**; 3* | DON; 3; 2 | THR; 1; 25 | THR; 2; 3 | THR; 3; 1* | OUL; 1; 3 | OUL; 2; 2 | OUL; 3; 17 | CRO; 1; 3 | CRO; 2; 2 | CRO; 3; 4 | SNE; 1; 3 | SNE; 2; 7 | SNE; 3; 1* | KNO; 1; 2 | KNO; 2; 3 | KNO; 3 Ret | ROC; 1; 4 | ROC; 2; 2 | ROC; 3; 5 | SIL; 1; 11 | SIL; 2; 7 | SIL; 3; 1* | BRH; 1; 2 | BRH; 2; 7 | **BRH**; **3**; 1* | **2nd** | **390** | |
| 2014 | Honda Yuasa Racing Team | Honda Civic Tourer | | BRH; 1; 4 | BRH; 2; 2 | BRH; 3; 6 | DON; 1; 6 | DON; 2; 3 | DON; 3; 1* | THR; 1; 3 | THR; 2; 1* | THR; 3; 6 | OUL; 1; 4 | OUL; 2; 5 | OUL; 3; 2 | CRO; 1; 2 | CRO; 2; 2 | CRO; 3; 4 | SNE; 1; 7 | SNE; 2; 3 | SNE; 3; 5 | KNO; 1; 3 | KNO; 2; 12 | KNO; 3; 6 | ROC; 1; 8 | ROC; 2; 8 | ROC; 3 Ret | SIL; 1; 14 | SIL; 2; 11 | SIL; 3; 8 | BRH; 1 Ret | BRH; 2; 6 | BRH; 3; 1* | **3rd** | **349** | |
| 2015 | Honda Yuasa Racing Team | Honda Civic Type R | | BRH; 1; 6 | BRH; 2; 1* | BRH; 3 NC | DON; 1; 2 | **DON**; **2**; 14 | DON; 3; 3 | THR; 1; 1* | THR; 2; 3 | THR; 3; 5 | OUL; 1; 6 | OUL; 2; 2 | OUL; 3; 4 | CRO; 1; 4 | CRO; 2; 5 | CRO; 3; 3* | SNE; 1; 14 | SNE; 2 Ret | SNE; 3; 24 | KNO; 1; 5 | KNO; 2; 1* | KNO; 3; 8 | ROC; 1; 2 | **ROC**; **2**; 1* | ROC; 3; 8 | SIL; 1; 3 | SIL; 2; 4 | SIL; 3; 5 | BRH; 1; 6 | BRH; 2; 19 | BRH; 3; 4 | **1st** | **348** | |
| 2016 | Halfords Yuasa Racing | Honda Civic Type R | | BRH; 1; 2 | BRH; 2; 1* | BRH; 3 Ret | DON; 1; 11 | DON; 2; 4 | DON; 3; 2 | THR; 1 Ret | THR; 2; 4 | THR; 3 Ret | OUL; 1; 4 | OUL; 2; 4 | OUL; 3; 23 | CRO; 1; 15 | CRO; 2; 13 | CRO; 3; 22 | **SNE**; **1**; 2* | SNE; 2; 10 | SNE; 3; 1* | KNO; 1; 9 | KNO; 2; 9 | KNO; 3; 4 | **ROC**; **1**; 1* | **ROC**; **2**; 10* | ROC; 3; 2 | SIL; 1; 23 | SIL; 2; 8 | **SIL**; **3**; 1* | BRH; 1; 5 | BRH; 2; 3 | BRH; 3; 3 | 1st | 308 | |
| 2017 | Halfords Yuasa Racing | Honda Civic Type R | | BRH; 1; 2 | BRH; 2; 1* | BRH; 3; 7 | DON; 1; 7 | DON; 2; 6 | DON; 3 DSQ | THR; 1; 2 | THR; 2; 2 | THR; 3; 4 | OUL; 1; 7 | OUL; 2; 4 | OUL; 3; 1* | CRO; 1; 5 | CRO; 2; 4 | CRO; 3; 9 | SNE; 1; 13 | SNE; 2; 7 | SNE; 3; 1* | KNO; 1; 11 | KNO; 2; 6 | KNO; 3; 2 | ROC; 1; 30 | ROC; 2 Ret | ROC; 3; 12 | SIL; 1; 11 | SIL; 2; 7 | SIL; 3; 21 | BRH; 1; 7 | BRH; 2; 2 | BRH; 3; 6 | 4th | 309 | |
| 2021 | Halfords Racing with Cataclean | Honda Civic Type R | | THR; 1 Ret | THR; 2; 18 | THR; 3; 4 | SNE; 1; 15 | SNE; 2; 11 | SNE; 3; 3 | BRH; 1; 2 | BRH; 2; 21 | BRH; 3; 16 | OUL; 1; 2 | OUL; 2; 6 | OUL; 3; 3 | KNO; 1; 8 | KNO; 2; 5 | KNO; 3; 4 | THR; 1; 13 | THR; 2 Ret | THR; 3 Ret | CRO; 1; 10 | CRO; 2; 6 | CRO; 3; 2 | SIL; 1 Ret | SIL; 2; 19 | SIL; 3; 21 | **DON**; **1**; 1* | **DON**; **2**; 1* | DON; 3; 13 | BRH; 1; 3 | BRH; 2; 3 | BRH; 3; 7 | 6th | 251 | |
| 2022 | Halfords Racing with Cataclean | Honda Civic Type R | | DON; 1; 3 | DON; 2; 1* | DON; 3; 9 | BRH; 1; 8 | BRH; 2; 6 | BRH; 3; 11 | THR; 1; 24 | THR; 2; 11 | THR; 3 Ret | OUL; 1; 6 | OUL; 2; 5 | OUL; 3; 4 | CRO; 1 Ret | CRO; 2; 12 | **CRO**; **3**; 1* | KNO; 1; 7 | KNO; 2; 5 | KNO; 3; 6 | SNE; 1; 10 | SNE; 2 Ret | SNE; 3; 15 | THR; 1; 2 | THR; 2; 3 | THR; 3; 9 | SIL; 1; 4 | SIL; 2; 3 | SIL; 3; 8 | BRH; 1 Ret | BRH; 2; 19 | BRH; 3; 13 | 7th | 248 | |
| 2025 | Toyota Gazoo Racing UK with IAA | Toyota Corolla GR Sport | | DON; 1; 19 | DON; 2; 11 | DON; 3; 13 | BRH; 1; 21 | BRH; 2; 16 | BRH; 3; 10 | SNE; 1 Ret | SNE; 2 DSQ | SNE; 3; 12 | THR; 1; 18 | THR; 2; 19 | THR; 3; 10 | OUL; 1; 16 | OUL; 2; 9 | **OUL**; **3**; 1* | CRO; 1; 11 | CRO; 2; 7 | CRO; 3; 4 | KNO; 1; 15 | KNO; 2; 13 | KNO; 3; 10 | DON; 1; 12 | DON; 2; 3 | DON; 3; 7 | SIL; 1; 3* | SIL; 2; 7 | SIL; 3; 16 | BRH; 1; 7 | BRH; 2; 4 | BRH; 3; 4 | 9th | 177 | |
| 2026 | Laser Tools Racing with MB Motorsport | Toyota Corolla GR Sport | | DON; 1; 5^{9} | DON; 2; 3 | DON; 3; 14 | BRH; 1; 12^{10} | BRH; 2 Ret | BRH; 3; 7 | SNE; 1; 13^{13} | SNE; 2; 7 | **SNE**; **3**; 1* | OUL; 1; 12 | OUL; 2; 6 | OUL; 3 Ret | THR; 1 Ret^{8} | THR; 2; 10 | THR; 3; 7 | KNO; 1; 3^{2} | KNO; 2; 7 | KNO; 3; 23 | DON; 1; 3^{6} | DON; 2; 13 | DON; 3; 6 | CRO; 1; 13 | CRO; 2; 6 | CRO; 3; 3 | SIL; 1; 6^{10} | SIL; 2; 12 | SIL; 3; 4 | BRH; 1 Ret^{14} | BRH; 2 Ret | BRH; 3; 9 | 11th | 249 | |

=== Complete British GT Championship results ===
(key) (Races in bold indicate pole position) (Races in italics indicate fastest lap)

| Year | Team | Car | Class | 1 | 2 | 3 | 4 | 5 | 6 | 7 | 8 | 9 | 10 | DC | Pts |
|---|---|---|---|---|---|---|---|---|---|---|---|---|---|---|---|
| 2011 | Rosso Verde | Ferrari 458 Italia | GT3 | OUL; 1 | OUL; 2 | SNE; 1 | BRH; 1 | SPA; 1 | SPA; 2 | ROC; 1 | ROC; 2 | DON; 1; 6 | SIL; 1; 11 | 21st | 12 |

=== Complete TCR International Series results ===
(key) (Races in bold indicate pole position) (Races in italics indicate fastest lap)

| Year | Team | Car | 1 | 2 | 3 | 4 | 5 | 6 | 7 | 8 | 9 | 10 | 11 | 12 | 13 | 14 | 15 | 16 | 17 | 18 | 19 | 20 | DC | Points |
|---|---|---|---|---|---|---|---|---|---|---|---|---|---|---|---|---|---|---|---|---|---|---|---|---|
| 2017 | Leopard Racing Team WRT | Volkswagen Golf GTI TCR | RIM; 1 | RIM; 2 | BHR; 1 | BHR; 2 | SPA; 1 | SPA; 2 | MNZ; 1 | MNZ; 2 | SAL; 1 | SAL; 2 | HUN; 1 | HUN; 2 | OSC; 1 | OSC; 2 | CHA; 1 | CHA; 2 | ZHE; 1 | ZHE; 2 | **DUB**; **1**; 2 | DUB; 2; 7 | 19th | 31 |

=== Complete World Touring Car Cup results ===
(key) (Races in bold indicate pole position) (Races in italics indicate fastest lap)

| Year | Team | Car | 1 | 2 | 3 | 4 | 5 | 6 | 7 | 8 | 9 | 10 | 11 | 12 | 13 | 14 | 15 | 16 | 17 | 18 | 19 | 20 | 21 | 22 | 23 | 24 | 25 | 26 | 27 | 28 | 29 | 30 | DC | Points |
|---|---|---|---|---|---|---|---|---|---|---|---|---|---|---|---|---|---|---|---|---|---|---|---|---|---|---|---|---|---|---|---|---|---|---|
| 2018 | Audi Sport Leopard Lukoil Team | Audi RS 3 LMS TCR | MAR; 1; 5 | MAR; 2; 11 | MAR; 3; 18† | HUN; 1; 18 | HUN; 2; 15 | HUN; 3; 12 | GER; 1; 7 | GER; 2; 18 | GER; 3; 13 | NED; 1; 4 | NED; 2; 6 | NED; 3; 5 | POR; 1; 9 | POR; 2; 6 | POR; 3; 17† | SVK; 1; 17 | SVK; 2; 15 | SVK; 3 Ret | CHN; 1; 14 | CHN; 2; 14 | CHN; 3; 13 | WUH; 1; 3 | WUH; 2 Ret | **WUH**; **3**; 1 | JPN; 1; 18 | JPN; 2; 18 | JPN; 3; 16 | MAC; 1 Ret | MAC; 2; 14 | MAC; 3 Ret | 13th | 122 |
| 2019 | Leopard Racing Team Audi Sport | Audi RS 3 LMS TCR | MAR; 1; 14 | MAR; 2; 15 | MAR; 3; 7 | HUN; 1 Ret | HUN; 2 Ret | HUN; 3; 21 | SVK; 1; 12 | SVK; 2; 13 | SVK; 3; 15 | NED; 1; 17 | NED; 2; 22 | NED; 3; 24 | GER; 1 Ret | GER; 2; 21 | GER; 3; 9 | POR; 1; 16 | POR; 2; 20 | POR; 3 Ret | CHN; 1; 22 | CHN; 2; 13 | CHN; 3; 15 | JPN; 1 Ret | JPN; 2; 20 | JPN; 3; 20 | MAC; 1 WD | MAC; 2 WD | MAC; 3 WD | MAL; 1; 15 | MAL; 2; 27^{†} | MAL; 3 Ret | 26th | 35 |

^{†} Driver did not finish the race, but was classified as he completed over 90% of the race distance.

Sporting positions
| Preceded by Matt Neal | British Touring Car Championship; Champion; 2012 | Succeeded by Andrew Jordan |
| Preceded by Colin Turkington | British Touring Car Championship; Champion; 2015–2016 | Succeeded by Ashley Sutton |
Awards and achievements
| Preceded by Matt Neal | Autosport Awards; National Driver of the Year; 2012 | Succeeded by Andrew Jordan |
| Preceded by Colin Turkington | Autosport Awards; National Driver of the Year; 2015–2016 | Succeeded by Lando Norris |
