= Martin Johnson (racing driver) =

British racing driver (born 1963)

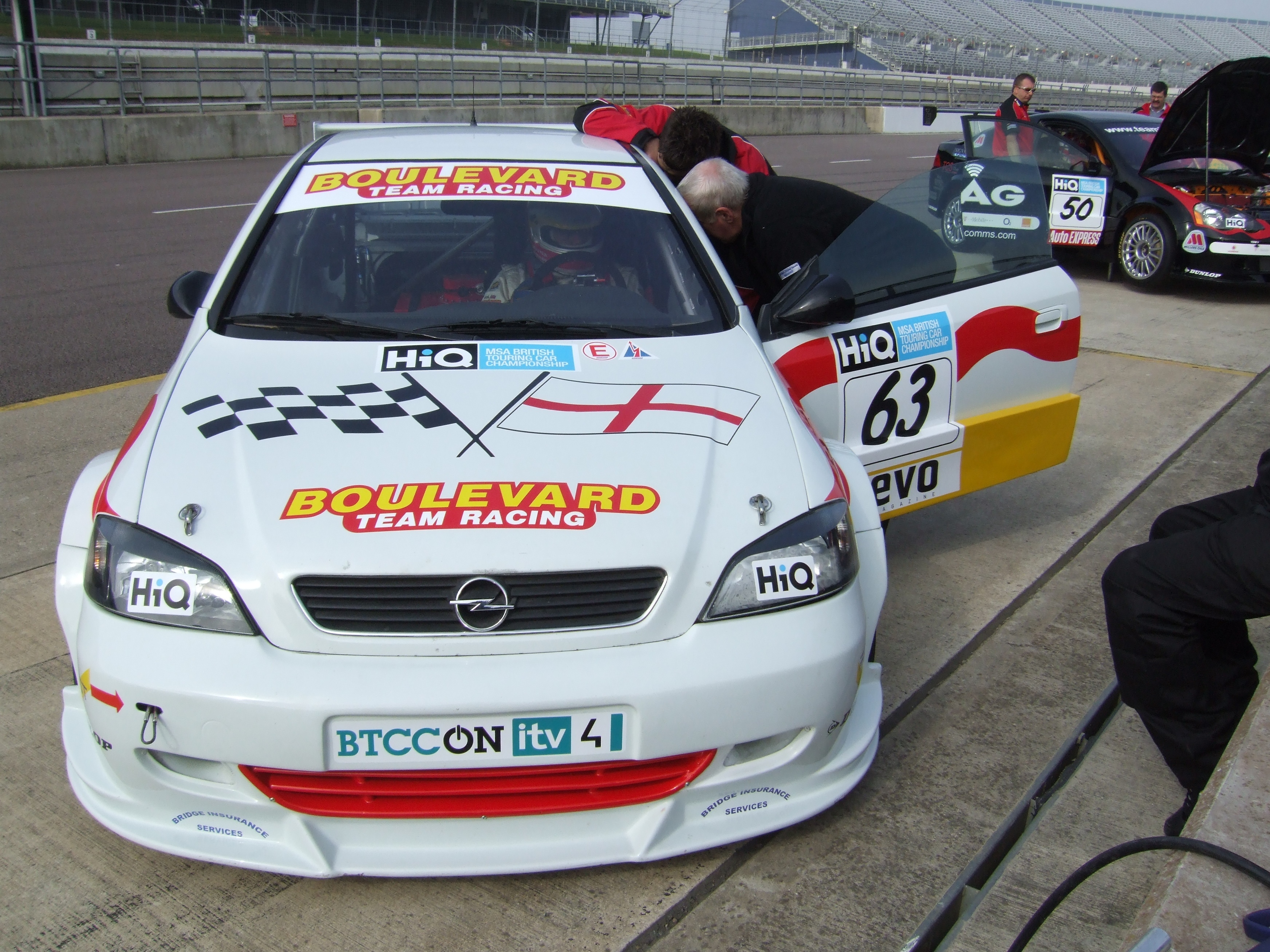
- Nationality: British
- Born: 27 March 1963 (age 63) Leatherhead, England

Previous series
- 2009–10 2000–06: BTCC; Renault Clio Cup UK

Martin Johnson (born 27 March 1963 in Leatherhead) is a British racing driver. He is best known for competing in the British Touring Car Championship with his own team, Boulevard Team Racing.

== Career ==
After competing in the Renault Clio Cup between 2000 and 2006, Johnson stepped up to the British Touring Car Championship in 2009. He competed a Vauxhall Astra Coupe prepared by his Boulevard Team Racing outfit, which was the same car that Erkut Kızılırmak campaigned in Turkey in 2008. He finished 22nd on points overall, with two championship points scored with tenth-placed finishes at Snetterton and Rockingham. Johnson returned for a second season in the BTCC for 2010.

Since 2011, Johnson has been racing the Astra in the United Arab Emirates.

== Boulevard Team Racing ==
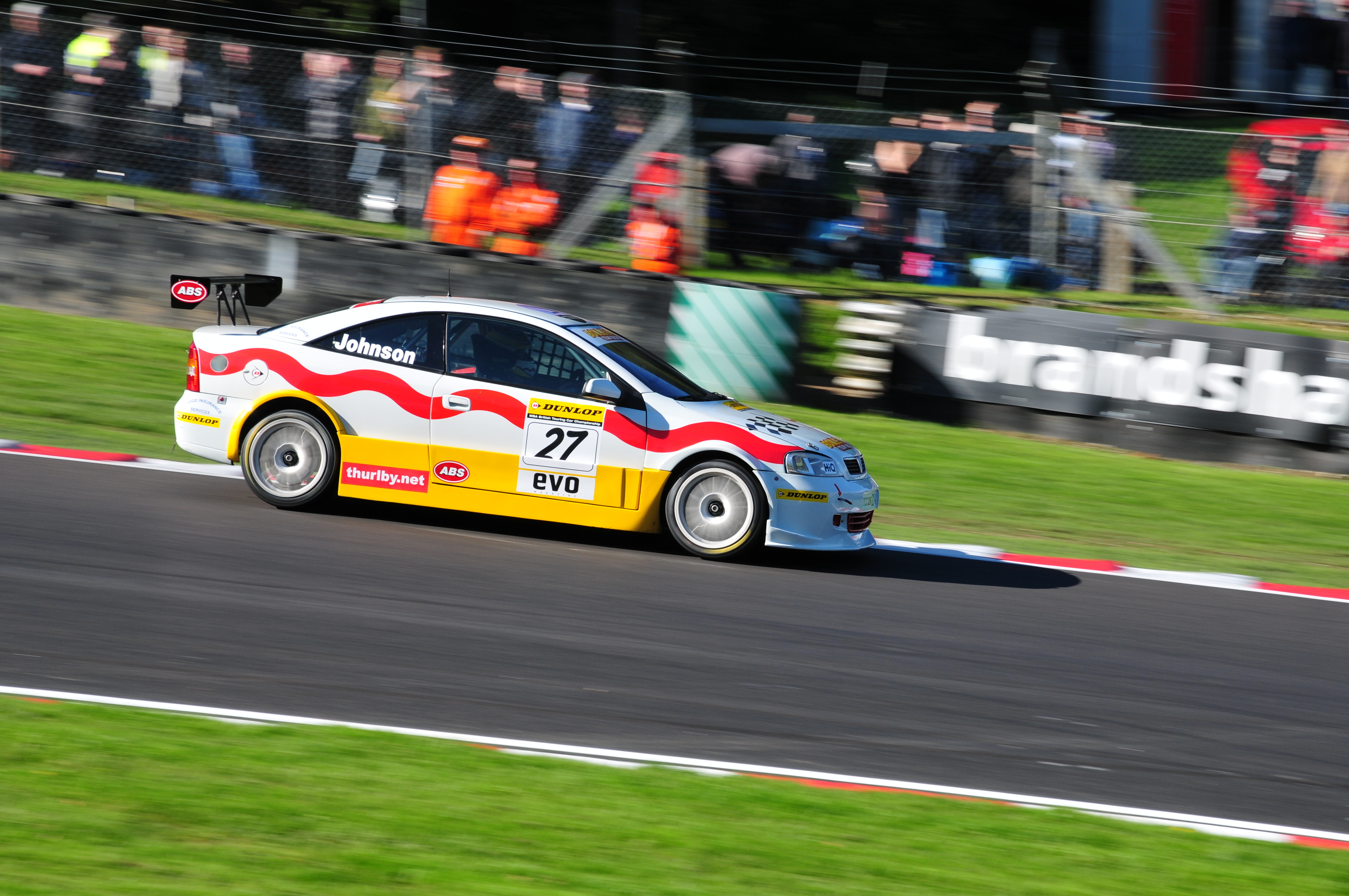
Johnson driving the Boulevard Team Racing Vauxhall Astra Coupé at Brands Hatch during the 2010 British Touring Car Championship season.

Boulevard Team Racing is a family-run team, managed by Johnson's father Cliff until his death in June 2010. It has established itself as a front-running team in the Renault Clio Cup over the last decade and won the drivers' and teams' title in 2004 with Paul Rivett alongside Johnson.

== Personal life ==
Johnson lives in Alford, Lincolnshire.

== Racing record ==
=== Complete British Touring Car Championship results ===
(key) (Races in bold indicate pole position – 1 point awarded just in first race) (Races in italics indicate fastest lap – 1 point awarded all races) (* signifies that driver lead race for at least one lap – 1 point awarded all races)

Year	Team	Car	1	2	3	4	5	6	7	8	9	10	11	12	13	14	15	16	17	18	19	20	21	22	23	24	25	26	27	28	29	30	DC	Pts
2009	Boulevard Team Racing	Vauxhall Astra Coupé	BRH; 1; 12	BRH; 2 Ret	BRH; 3; 13	THR; 1; 16	THR; 2; 16	THR; 3; 14	DON; 1; 11	DON; 2; 16	DON; 3; 12	OUL; 1; 18	OUL; 2; 16	OUL; 3 Ret	CRO; 1; 12	CRO; 2; 12	CRO; 3 Ret	SNE; 1; 14	SNE; 2; 15	SNE; 3; 10	KNO; 1; 12	KNO; 2; 13	KNO; 3; 13	SIL; 1 Ret	SIL; 2 DNS	SIL; 3; 16	ROC; 1; 16	ROC; 2; 14	ROC; 3; 10	BRH; 1 Ret	BRH; 2 DNS	BRH; 3 DNS	24th	2
2010	Boulevard Team Racing	Vauxhall Astra Coupé	THR; 1; 11	THR; 2; 19	THR; 3 Ret	ROC; 1; 9	ROC; 2; 15	ROC; 3; 11	BRH; 1 Ret	BRH; 2 Ret	BRH; 3 DNS	OUL; 1; 15	OUL; 2 NC	OUL; 3; 14	CRO; 1; 16	CRO; 2; 15	CRO; 3 Ret	SNE; 1 Ret	SNE; 2; 12	SNE; 3 DNS	SIL; 1; 18	SIL; 2; 16	SIL; 3; 15	KNO; 1	KNO; 2	KNO; 3	DON; 1; 11	DON; 2 Ret	DON; 3 DNS	BRH; 1; 18	BRH; 2 DNS	BRH; 3; 15	20th	2
