= 2010 Ginetta G50 Cup =

The 2010 Michelin Ginetta G50 Cup was the third Ginetta G50 Cup. The season began at Thruxton on 4 April and finished after 28 races over 10 rounds at Brands Hatch on 10 October, supporting rounds of the British Touring Car Championship.

Despite scoring 38 fewer points overall than title rival Carl Breeze, it was Dynojet's Frank Wrathall who became champion after a successful season in which he took five overall victories, as well as taking six other class victories in which he was the first championship-registered finisher. Ten points behind on dropped scores was Total Control Racing's Breeze, an improvement on his third place championship finish behind Nathan Freke and Wrathall in 2009. Breeze took nine overall victories, but championship hopes were thwarted by 40 penalty points picked up during the season. Third place went to Century Motorsport's Benji Hetherington, who took two overall victories and two other victories, with double Croft winner Tom Sharp (IDL) and the second Century Motorsport car of Benji's brother, Freddie Hetherington, who finished on the podium twice.

Outside the top five, Wrathall's Dynojet team-mate Adam Morgan took the other overall victory to be claimed during the season – at Croft – while Matt Bell took a class win at Thruxton for United Autosports. Nine wins were taken by guest drivers during the season; Nigel Moore claimed five victories in eleven starts for Tockwith, Jonathan Adam won a race at his home circuit of Knockhill in the Ginetta Cars entry, denoted as the "guest car", while Rob Huff took a hat-trick of victories at the opening round at Thruxton when the guest car was run by Dynojet for one event only.

== Teams and drivers ==
Team	No.	Drivers	Rounds
HHC Motorsport	2	(United Kingdom) Stephen Tyldsley	4–6
Optimum	2	(United Kingdom) Stephen Tyldsley	2–3
Optimum	20	(United Kingdom) Stephen Tyldsley	1
Optimum	7	(United Kingdom) Mark Davies	1–8
Optimum	17	(United Kingdom) Neil Houston	8
Optimum	25	(United Kingdom) Nigel Moore	5
Optimum	55	(United Kingdom) Gary Simms	4
Total Control Racing	3	(United Kingdom) Carl Breeze	All
Total Control Racing	75	(Switzerland) Joachim Ritter	All
Tockwith	5	(United Kingdom) Alice Powell	1–5
Tockwith	25	(United Kingdom) Nigel Moore	7–9
CDR	5	(United Kingdom) Alice Powell	6
CDR	7	(United Kingdom) Mark Davies	9–10
CDR	74	(United Kingdom) Chris Dittmann	1–4, 7, 9–10
Barwell Motorsport	8	(United Kingdom) Julien Draper	1–7, 10
Barwell Motorsport	28	(United Kingdom) Ben Jackson	7
Barwell Motorsport	40	(United Kingdom) Jon Barnes	5
Barwell Motorsport	41	(United Kingdom) Matt Allison	6
Barwell Motorsport	88	(United Kingdom) Matt Draper	3
Team GCR	9	(United Kingdom) Rachel Green	1–3
Team GCR	12	(United Kingdom) Dave McGuire	4
Team GCR	99	(United Kingdom) Tom Dunstan	2
IDL	10	(United Kingdom) Tom Sharp	All
IDL	11	(United Kingdom) Rod McGovern	4
IDL	69	(United Kingdom) Jack Stanford	2
Century Motorsport / Triton Digital	16	(United Kingdom) Benji Hetherington	All
Century Motorsport / Triton Digital	32	(United Kingdom) Freddie Hetherington	All
Speedworks Motorsport	20	(United Kingdom) Tony Hughes	2–4, 6–7, 9–10
Speedworks Motorsport	21	(United Kingdom) Charlie Butler-Henderson	4
Speedworks Motorsport	48	(United Kingdom) Ron Johnson	6, 9–10
United Autosports	23	(United Kingdom) Matt Bell	1–2
FML	27	(United Kingdom) Aaron Williamson	6–10
Century Motorsport	27	(United Kingdom) Aaron Williamson	1–3
Century Motorsport	84	(United Kingdom) Phil Broad	1–2, 4, 6–7, 10
Century Motorsport	85	(United Kingdom) Mark Jessop	9
Ginetta Cars	50	(United Kingdom) Kieran Vernon	2
Ginetta Cars	50	(United Kingdom) Simon Hill	3
Ginetta Cars	50	(United Kingdom) Martin Donnelly	4
Ginetta Cars	50	(United Kingdom) Stefan Hodgetts	5
Ginetta Cars	50	(United Kingdom) Adrian Newey	6
Ginetta Cars	50	(United Kingdom) Giles Dawson	7
Ginetta Cars	50	(United Kingdom) Jonathan Adam	8
Ginetta Cars	50	(United Kingdom) Alistair Barclay	9
Ginetta Cars	50	(United Kingdom) Dave Newsham	10
Dynojet	50	(United Kingdom) Rob Huff	1
Dynojet	66	(United Kingdom) Frank Wrathall	All
Dynojet	67	(United Kingdom) Adam Morgan	All
Matt Blyth Motorsport	73	(United Kingdom) Dan Denis	1, 4, 6–7, 9–10
Matt Blyth Motorsport	98	(United Kingdom) Chrissy Palmer	9
CWS	78	(United Kingdom) Colin White	All

== Calendar ==
The series was contested over 28 races held at 10 rounds and supported the British Touring Car Championship at all rounds. All rounds were held in the United Kingdom.

Round		Circuit	Date	Pole position	Fastest lap	Winning driver	Winning team
1	R1	Thruxton Circuit, Hampshire	3 April	(United Kingdom) Rob Huff	(United Kingdom) Rob Huff	(United Kingdom) Rob Huff	Dynojet
1	R2	Thruxton Circuit, Hampshire	4 April		(United Kingdom) Frank Wrathall	(United Kingdom) Rob Huff	Dynojet
1	R3	Thruxton Circuit, Hampshire	4 April		(United Kingdom) Frank Wrathall	(United Kingdom) Rob Huff	Dynojet
2	R4	Rockingham Motor Speedway, Northamptonshire	24 April	(United Kingdom) Frank Wrathall	(United Kingdom) Carl Breeze	(United Kingdom) Frank Wrathall	Dynojet
2	R5	Rockingham Motor Speedway, Northamptonshire	25 April		(United Kingdom) Carl Breeze	(United Kingdom) Carl Breeze	Total Control Racing
2	R6	Rockingham Motor Speedway, Northamptonshire	25 April		(United Kingdom) Frank Wrathall	(United Kingdom) Frank Wrathall	Dynojet
3	R7	Brands Hatch (GP), Kent	1 May	(United Kingdom) Carl Breeze	(United Kingdom) Carl Breeze	(United Kingdom) Carl Breeze	Total Control Racing
3	R8	Brands Hatch (GP), Kent	2 May		(United Kingdom) Frank Wrathall	(United Kingdom) Carl Breeze	Total Control Racing
3	R9	Brands Hatch (GP), Kent	2 May		(United Kingdom) Mark Davies	(United Kingdom) Frank Wrathall	Dynojet
4	R10	Oulton Park, Cheshire	5 June	(United Kingdom) Carl Breeze	(United Kingdom) Carl Breeze	(United Kingdom) Carl Breeze	Total Control Racing
4	R11	Oulton Park, Cheshire	6 June		(United Kingdom) Stephen Tyldsley	(United Kingdom) Carl Breeze	Total Control Racing
5	R12	Croft Circuit, North Yorkshire	19 June	(United Kingdom) Tom Sharp	(United Kingdom) Frank Wrathall	(United Kingdom) Tom Sharp	IDL
5	R13	Croft Circuit, North Yorkshire	20 June		(United Kingdom) Stefan Hodgetts	(United Kingdom) Tom Sharp	IDL
5	R14	Croft Circuit, North Yorkshire	20 June		(United Kingdom) Nigel Moore	(United Kingdom) Adam Morgan	Dynojet
6	R15	Snetterton Motor Racing Circuit, Norfolk	7 August	(United Kingdom) Carl Breeze	(United Kingdom) Stephen Tyldsley	(United Kingdom) Carl Breeze	Total Control Racing
6	R16	Snetterton Motor Racing Circuit, Norfolk	7 August		(United Kingdom) Frank Wrathall	(United Kingdom) Carl Breeze	Total Control Racing
6	R17	Snetterton Motor Racing Circuit, Norfolk	8 August		(United Kingdom) Frank Wrathall	(United Kingdom) Frank Wrathall	Dynojet
7	R18	Silverstone Circuit, Northamptonshire	21 August	(United Kingdom) Chris Dittmann	(United Kingdom) Frank Wrathall	(United Kingdom) Frank Wrathall	Dynojet
7	R19	Silverstone Circuit, Northamptonshire	22 August		(United Kingdom) Chris Dittmann	(United Kingdom) Benji Hetherington	Century Motorsport
8	R20	Knockhill Racing Circuit, Fife	4 September	(United Kingdom) Jonathan Adam	(United Kingdom) Jonathan Adam	(United Kingdom) Nigel Moore	Tockwith
8	R21	Knockhill Racing Circuit, Fife	5 September		(United Kingdom) Nigel Moore	(United Kingdom) Nigel Moore	Tockwith
8	R22	Knockhill Racing Circuit, Fife	5 September		(United Kingdom) Jonathan Adam	(United Kingdom) Jonathan Adam	Ginetta Cars
9	R23	Donington Park, Leicestershire	18 September	(United Kingdom) Chrissy Palmer	(United Kingdom) Nigel Moore	(United Kingdom) Nigel Moore	Tockwith
9	R24	Donington Park, Leicestershire	19 September		(United Kingdom) Benji Hetherington	(United Kingdom) Nigel Moore	Tockwith
9	R25	Donington Park, Leicestershire	19 September		(United Kingdom) Nigel Moore	(United Kingdom) Nigel Moore	Tockwith
10	R26	Brands Hatch (Indy), Kent	9 October	(United Kingdom) Tom Sharp	(United Kingdom) Carl Breeze	(United Kingdom) Carl Breeze	Total Control Racing
10	R27	Brands Hatch (Indy), Kent	10 October		(United Kingdom) Tom Sharp	(United Kingdom) Carl Breeze	Total Control Racing
10	R28	Brands Hatch (Indy), Kent	10 October		(United Kingdom) Carl Breeze	(United Kingdom) Benji Hetherington	Century Motorsport

== Championship standings ==
Pos	Driver	THR			ROC			BHGP			OUL		CRO			SNE			SIL		KNO			DON			BHI			Total	Pen	Drop	Pts
1	(United Kingdom) Frank Wrathall	2	2	7	1	2	1	Ret	4	1	2	2	4	5	4	2	4	1	1	Ret	2	2	3	6	10	2	4	3	DNS	737	10		727
2	(United Kingdom) Carl Breeze	5	3	4	2	1	2	1	1	13	1	1	3	3	3	1	1	2	2	6	4	10	9	13	9	3	1	1	3	775	40	18	717
3	(United Kingdom) Benji Hetherington	8	5	11	3	Ret	3	3	3	2	6	4	10	8	8	16	11	Ret	3	1	3	3	4	2	2	DSQ	2	2	1	606	35		571
4	(United Kingdom) Tom Sharp	4	18	8	4	6	6	2	2	Ret	11	Ret	1	1	5	6	2	12	10	3	9	7	Ret	Ret	4	4	Ret	12	4	488			488
5	(United Kingdom) Freddie Hetherington	14	11	17	12	7	4	9	8	11	9	5	12	10	10	4	5	3	11	5	5	6	7	Ret	5	11	5	5	2	446	15	5	426
6	(United Kingdom) Adam Morgan	DNS	12	9	5	3	15	5	7	4	15	10	6	6	1	8	3	Ret	7	4	6	5	5	3	13	9	Ret	DNS	DNS	435	10		425
7	(Switzerland) Joachim Ritter	12	7	5	7	12	9	13	11	Ret	18	16	11	11	6	14	10	8	13	15	7	11	8	5	12	10	9	9	9	340	15	4	321
8	(United Kingdom) Mark Davies	Ret	16	Ret	6	17	16	Ret	13	9	4	15	8	7	Ret	5	DSQ	9	6	Ret	Ret	12	11	4	8	6	6	6	6	314	15		299
9	(United Kingdom) Colin White	16	10	10	8	10	Ret	7	15	Ret	7	14	14	12	9	11	7	5	9	13	Ret	8	Ret	10	7	8	11	11	13	297			297
10	(United Kingdom) Chris Dittmann	3	4	3	Ret	Ret	13	12	10	3	3	6							Ret	9				Ret	11	7	3	4	10	288			288
11	(United Kingdom) Aaron Williamson	13	14	16	16	16	10	6	5	7						12	6	4	8	7	Ret	9	6	12	DNS	12	Ret	NC	11	247	15		232
12	(United Kingdom) Julien Draper	9	8	12	11	5	11	Ret	9	6	19	8	13	13	11	Ret	DNS	10	15	10							7	10	8	234	10		224
13	(United Kingdom) Stephen Tyldsley	11	9	6	10	8	5	4	6	Ret	5	3	15	14	Ret	7	Ret	6												231	15		216
14	(United Kingdom) Dan Denis	Ret	Ret	DNS							14	12				13	8	7	4	8				7	3	5	8	8	Ret	191			191
15	(United Kingdom) Phil Broad	10	17	14	13	Ret	14				13	7				3	Ret	Ret	5	2							10	13	7	179			179
16	(United Kingdom) Alice Powell	15	13	13	Ret	14	8	8	12	5	10	Ret	7	Ret	7	10	9	Ret												163			163
17	(United Kingdom) Tony Hughes				15	Ret	18	11	16	12	17	13				15	Ret	Ret	16	14				9	15	15	12	14	12	126			126
18	(United Kingdom) Ron Johnson															17	13	13						11	17	13	13	15	14	70			70
19	(United Kingdom) Rachel Green	6	15	15	9	9	12	DNS	DNS	DNS																				69			69
20	(United Kingdom) Matt Bell	7	6	2	Ret	10	DNS																							84	30		54
21	(United Kingdom) Neil Houston																				10	13	10							38			38
22	(United Kingdom) Jon Barnes												9	9	Ret															32			32
23	(United Kingdom) Tom Dunstan				Ret	13	7																							25			25
24	(United Kingdom) Mark Jessop																							8	14	Ret				24			24
25	(United Kingdom) Rod McGovern										16	9																		18			18
26	(United Kingdom) Matt Draper							Ret	17	10																				17			17
27	(United Kingdom) Gary Simms										Ret	11																		10			10
28	(United Kingdom) Ben Jackson																		Ret	11										10			10
29	(United Kingdom) Jack Stanford				14	15	17																							18	10		8
30	(United Kingdom) Matt Allison															9	Ret	11												22	15		7
31	(United Kingdom) Dave McGuire										20	Ret																		2			2
32	(United Kingdom) Charlie Butler-Henderson										12	Ret																		10	10		0
33	(United Kingdom) Chrissy Palmer																							Ret	6	DSQ				21	35		−14
guest drivers ineligible for points
	(United Kingdom) Nigel Moore												5	4	Ret				12	Ret	1	1	2	1	1	1				0			0
	(United Kingdom) Rob Huff	1	1	1																										0			0
	(United Kingdom) Jonathan Adam																				8	4	1							0			0
	(United Kingdom) Stefan Hodgetts												2	2	2															0			0
	(United Kingdom) Kieran Vernon				Ret	4	Ret																							0			0
	(United Kingdom) Dave Newsham																										DNS	7	5	0			0
	(United Kingdom) Simon Hill							10	14	8																				0			0
	(United Kingdom) Martin Donnelly										8	Ret																		0			0
	(United Kingdom) Giles Dawson																		14	12										0			0
	(United Kingdom) Adrian Newey															Ret	12	Ret												0			0
	(United Kingdom) Alistair Barclay																							14	16	14				0			0
Pos	Driver	THR			ROC			BHGP			OUL		CRO			SNE			SIL		KNO			DON			BHI			Total	Pen	Drop	Pts
