= 2009 Ginetta G50 Cup =

Motor racing competition

The 2009 Michelin Ginetta G50 Cup was the second Ginetta G50 Cup. The season began at Brands Hatch on 4 April and finished after 28 races over 10 rounds also at Brands Hatch on 4 October, supporting rounds of the British Touring Car Championship.

== Teams and drivers ==
Team	No.	Drivers	Rounds
Hepworth International	2	(United Kingdom) Jody Firth	1
Hepworth International	11	(United Kingdom) Stephen Tyldsley	10
Hepworth International	50	(United Kingdom) Ben Anderson	8
Rob Austin Racing	3	(United Kingdom) Henry Fletcher	1
Rob Austin Racing	3	(United Kingdom) Rob Austin	2, 8
Rob Austin Racing	6	(United Kingdom) Henry Fletcher	2
Rob Austin Racing	6	(United Kingdom) Emily Fletcher	10
Welch Motorsport	4	(United Kingdom) Daniel Welch	2
Welch Motorsport	5	(Iran) Kourosh Khani	5
Welch Motorsport	69	(United Kingdom) Jeff Davies	10
Welch Motorsport	84	(United Kingdom) Michael Broadhurst	8
Team GCR	5	(United Kingdom) Tom Dunstan	1
Total Control Racing	7	(United Kingdom) Carl Breeze	All
Total Control Racing	75	(Denmark) Joachim Ritter	2–10
yourracingcar.com/TCR	23	(United Kingdom) Fulvio Mussi	All
Colards Motorsport	8	(United Kingdom) Julien Draper	All
Colards Motorsport	28	(Italy) Michele Tommasi	10
Colards Motorsport	29	(United Kingdom) Rachel Green	10
Colards Motorsport	58	(Sweden) Hampus Rydman	1–6
Colards Motorsport	58	(United Kingdom) Neil Houston	8
IDL	10	(United Kingdom) Tom Sharp	All
Speedworks Motorsport	12	(United Kingdom) Mark Proctor	1, 3–4
Speedworks Motorsport	15	(United Kingdom) Charlie Butler-Henderson	6
Speedworks Motorsport	19	(United Kingdom) Christian Dick	1–6, 9
Speedworks Motorsport	20	(United Kingdom) Tony Hughes	3–4, 6, 8–10
Speedworks Motorsport	21	(United Kingdom) Richard Sykes	1–4, 8–10
Speedworks Motorsport	22	(United Kingdom) Ron Johnson	8
SR Motorsport	17	(Brazil) Diego Freitas	5
SR Motorsport	18	(United Kingdom) Paul Sheard	1–4, 7–8
SR Motorsport	75	(Denmark) Joachim Ritter	1
Ben Jackson	27	(United Kingdom) Ben Jackson	10
Muzz Racing	33	(United Kingdom) Ken Rattenbury	8–10
Dynojet	66	(United Kingdom) Frank Wrathall	All
Dynojet	67	(United Kingdom) Adam Morgan	9–10
Century Motorsport/EOS Productions	72	(United Kingdom) Benji Hetherington	4, 6–10
Century Motorsport/EOS Productions	73	(United Kingdom) Nathan Freke	All
Mann Autoservices Engineering	74	(United Kingdom) Chris Dittmann	2–6, 8, 10
CWS	78	(United Kingdom) Colin White	All
Krayem Motorsport	88	(United Kingdom) David Krayem	6, 8

== Race calendar and results ==
All rounds were held in the United Kingdom.

Round		Circuit	Date	Pole position	Fastest lap	Winning driver	Winning team
1	R1	Brands Hatch (Indy), Kent	4 April	(United Kingdom) Frank Wrathall	(United Kingdom) Carl Breeze	(United Kingdom) Carl Breeze	Total Control Racing
1	R2	Brands Hatch (Indy), Kent	5 April		(United Kingdom) Nathan Freke	(United Kingdom) Frank Wrathall	Dynojet
1	R3	Brands Hatch (Indy), Kent	5 April		(United Kingdom) Carl Breeze	(United Kingdom) Carl Breeze	Total Control Racing
2	R4	Thruxton Circuit, Hampshire	25 April	(United Kingdom) Daniel Welch	(United Kingdom) Daniel Welch	(United Kingdom) Carl Breeze	Total Control Racing
2	R5	Thruxton Circuit, Hampshire	26 April		(United Kingdom) Carl Breeze	(United Kingdom) Daniel Welch	Welch Motorsport
2	R6	Thruxton Circuit, Hampshire	26 April		(United Kingdom) Daniel Welch	(United Kingdom) Carl Breeze	Total Control Racing
3	R7	Donington Park, Leicestershire	16 May	(United Kingdom) Nathan Freke	(United Kingdom) Nathan Freke	(United Kingdom) Nathan Freke	Century Motorsport
3	R8	Donington Park, Leicestershire	17 May		(United Kingdom) Nathan Freke	(United Kingdom) Nathan Freke	Century Motorsport
3	R9	Donington Park, Leicestershire	17 May		(United Kingdom) Tom Sharp	(United Kingdom) Nathan Freke	Century Motorsport
4	R10	Oulton Park, Cheshire	30 May	(United Kingdom) Carl Breeze	(United Kingdom) Nathan Freke	(United Kingdom) Nathan Freke	Century Motorsport
4	R11	Oulton Park, Cheshire	31 May	Race postponed due to accident involving Carl Breeze and Mark Proctor. Run at Silverstone.			
5	R12	Croft Circuit, North Yorkshire	13 June	(United Kingdom) Nathan Freke	(United Kingdom) Nathan Freke	(United Kingdom) Nathan Freke	Century Motorsport
5	R13	Croft Circuit, North Yorkshire	14 June		(United Kingdom) Nathan Freke	(United Kingdom) Nathan Freke	Century Motorsport
5	R14	Croft Circuit, North Yorkshire	14 June		(United Kingdom) Frank Wrathall	(United Kingdom) Frank Wrathall	Dynojet
6	R15	Snetterton Motor Racing Circuit, Norfolk	1 August	(United Kingdom) Carl Breeze	(United Kingdom) Christian Dick	(United Kingdom) Carl Breeze	Total Control Racing
6	R16	Snetterton Motor Racing Circuit, Norfolk	1 August		(United Kingdom) Carl Breeze	(United Kingdom) Carl Breeze	Total Control Racing
6	R17	Snetterton Motor Racing Circuit, Norfolk	2 August		(United Kingdom) Fulvio Mussi	(United Kingdom) Carl Breeze	Total Control Racing
7	R18	Knockhill Racing Circuit, Fife	15 August	(United Kingdom) Nathan Freke	(United Kingdom) Frank Wrathall	(United Kingdom) Nathan Freke	Century Motorsport
7	R19	Knockhill Racing Circuit, Fife	16 August		(United Kingdom) Fulvio Mussi	(United Kingdom) Nathan Freke	Century Motorsport
7	R20	Knockhill Racing Circuit, Fife	16 August		(United Kingdom) Frank Wrathall	(United Kingdom) Frank Wrathall	Dynojet
8	R21	Silverstone Circuit, Northamptonshire	29 August	(United Kingdom) Nathan Freke	(United Kingdom) Nathan Freke	(United Kingdom) Nathan Freke	Century Motorsport
8	R22	Silverstone Circuit, Northamptonshire	30 August		(United Kingdom) Frank Wrathall	(United Kingdom) Nathan Freke	Century Motorsport
8	R11	Silverstone Circuit, Northamptonshire	30 August		(United Kingdom) Nathan Freke	(United Kingdom) Nathan Freke	Century Motorsport
9	R23	Rockingham Motor Speedway, Northamptonshire	19 September	(United Kingdom) Frank Wrathall	(United Kingdom) Nathan Freke	(United Kingdom) Frank Wrathall	Dynojet
9	R24	Rockingham Motor Speedway, Northamptonshire	20 September		(United Kingdom) Benji Hetherington	(United Kingdom) Frank Wrathall	Dynojet
9	R25	Rockingham Motor Speedway, Northamptonshire	20 September		(United Kingdom) Nathan Freke	(United Kingdom) Nathan Freke	Century Motorsport
10	R26	Brands Hatch (GP), Kent	3 October	(United Kingdom) Nathan Freke	(United Kingdom) Nathan Freke	(United Kingdom) Nathan Freke	Century Motorsport
10	R27	Brands Hatch (GP), Kent	3 October		(United Kingdom) Nathan Freke	(United Kingdom) Nathan Freke	Century Motorsport
10	R28	Brands Hatch (GP), Kent	4 October		(United Kingdom) Fulvio Mussi	(United Kingdom) Nathan Freke	Century Motorsport

== Championship standings ==
Points system
1st	2nd	3rd	4th	5th	6th	7th	8th	9th	10th	11th	12th	13th	14th	15th	16th	17th	18th	19th	20th	Pole position	Fastest lap
35	30	26	22	20	18	16	14	12	11	10	9	8	7	6	5	4	3	2	1	1	1

Pos	Driver	BHI			THR			DON			OUL		CRO			SNE			KNO			SIL			ROC			BHGP			Pts
1	(United Kingdom) Nathan Freke	3	3	2	5	5	2	1	1	1	1	C	1	1	2	4	9	3	1	1	4	1	1	1	2	10	1	1	1	1	856
2	(United Kingdom) Frank Wrathall	2	1	3	14	2	4	3	3	3	2	C	3	2	1	Ret	4	2	3	2	1	2	2	2	1	1	Ret	2	3	2	731
3	(United Kingdom) Carl Breeze	1	2	1	1	3	1	4	2	2	4	C	2	Ret	DNS	1	1	1	Ret	4	3	4	3	16	4	Ret	8	7	7	8	629
4	(United Kingdom) Fulvio Mussi	4	7	7	4	6	9	Ret	DNS	DNS	6	C	4	4	4	5	6	4	2	3	2	7	5	18	5	8	6	5	2	4	502
5	(United Kingdom) Tom Sharp	6	4	4	7	7	5	11	13	5	9	C	12	7	3	Ret	Ret	5	4	5	5	5	8	6	6	Ret	3	3	4	3	468
6	(United Kingdom) Christian Dick	11	6	9	3	4	6	5	4	9	3	C	5	3	7	2	2	7							7	3	4				389
7	(United Kingdom) Chris Dittman				6	Ret	8	2	5	4	5	C	Ret	10	8	3	3	6				3	Ret	4				6	6	7	319
8	(United Kingdom) Colin White	12	8	6	10	9	7	7	10	Ret	16	C	10	11	11	7	7	10	8	9	8	14	11	8	12	Ret	9	Ret	DNS	12	287
9	(United Kingdom) Benji Hetherington										14	C				8	5	8	5	6	10	Ret	6	5	3	2	2	4	5	5	281
10	(United Kingdom) Julien Draper	14	13	10	9	10	13	9	14	7	13	C	11	8	10	12	11	12	6	8	9	Ret	12	7	9	7	10	18	Ret	15	280
11	(Denmark) Joachim Ritter	10	14	14	13	12	11	8	7	8	7	C	7	9	9	9	10	11	7	Ret	6	9	Ret	10	10	5	11	Ret	DNS	16	273
12	(Sweden) Hampus Rydman	5	NC	DNS	8	8	Ret	10	6	6	8	C	6	5	5	6	8	9													211
13	(United Kingdom) Richard Sykes	Ret	10	15	11	11	10	13	11	12	11	C										8	7	9	8	Ret	7	10	8	13	190
14	(United Kingdom) Paul Sheard	13	9	13	DNS	13	12	6	8	11	10	C							DNS	7	7	10	13	13							157
15	(United Kingdom) Tony Hughes							12	12	13	15	C				11	13	Ret				11	14	Ret	11	6	Ret	13	12	17	116
16	(United Kingdom) Daniel Welch				2	1	3																								96
17	(United Kingdom) Adam Morgan																								Ret	4	5	8	13	6	82
18	(United Kingdom) Mark Proctor	9	11	8				Ret	9	10	12	C																			68
19	(United Kingdom) Rob Austin				DSQ	Ret	Ret															6	4	3							51
20	(United Kingdom) Ken Rattenbury																					16	16	17	13	9	12	17	Ret	19	49
21	(Brazil) Diego Freitas												9	6	6																48
22	(United Kingdom) Jody Firth	7	5	12																											45
23	(United Kingdom) Tom Dunstan	8	Ret	5																											34
24	(Iran) Kourosh Khani												8	12	12																32
25	(United Kingdom) Stephen Tyldsley																											12	9	10	32
26	(United Kingdom) Ben Anderson																					12	9	11							31
27	(Italy) Michele Tommasi																											11	10	11	31
28	(United Kingdom) Ben Jackson																											9	15	9	30
29	(United Kingdom) Henry Fletcher	Ret	12	11	12	Ret	Ret																								28
30	(United Kingdom) David Krayem															13	NC	13				15	17	Ret							26
31	(United Kingdom) Rachel Green																											14	11	14	24
32	(United Kingdom) Charlie Butler-Henderson															10	12	Ret													20
33	(United Kingdom) Michael Broadhurst																					Ret	10	12							20
34	(United Kingdom) Neil Houston																					13	18	15							17
35	(United Kingdom) Ron Johnson																					Ret	15	14							13
36	(United Kingdom) Emily Fletcher																											15	14	Ret	13
37	(United Kingdom) Jeff Davies																											16	Ret	18	8
Pos	Driver	BHI			THR			DON			OUL		CRO			SNE			KNO			SIL			ROC			BHGP			Pts
