= Jonny Adam =

British racing driver (born 1984)

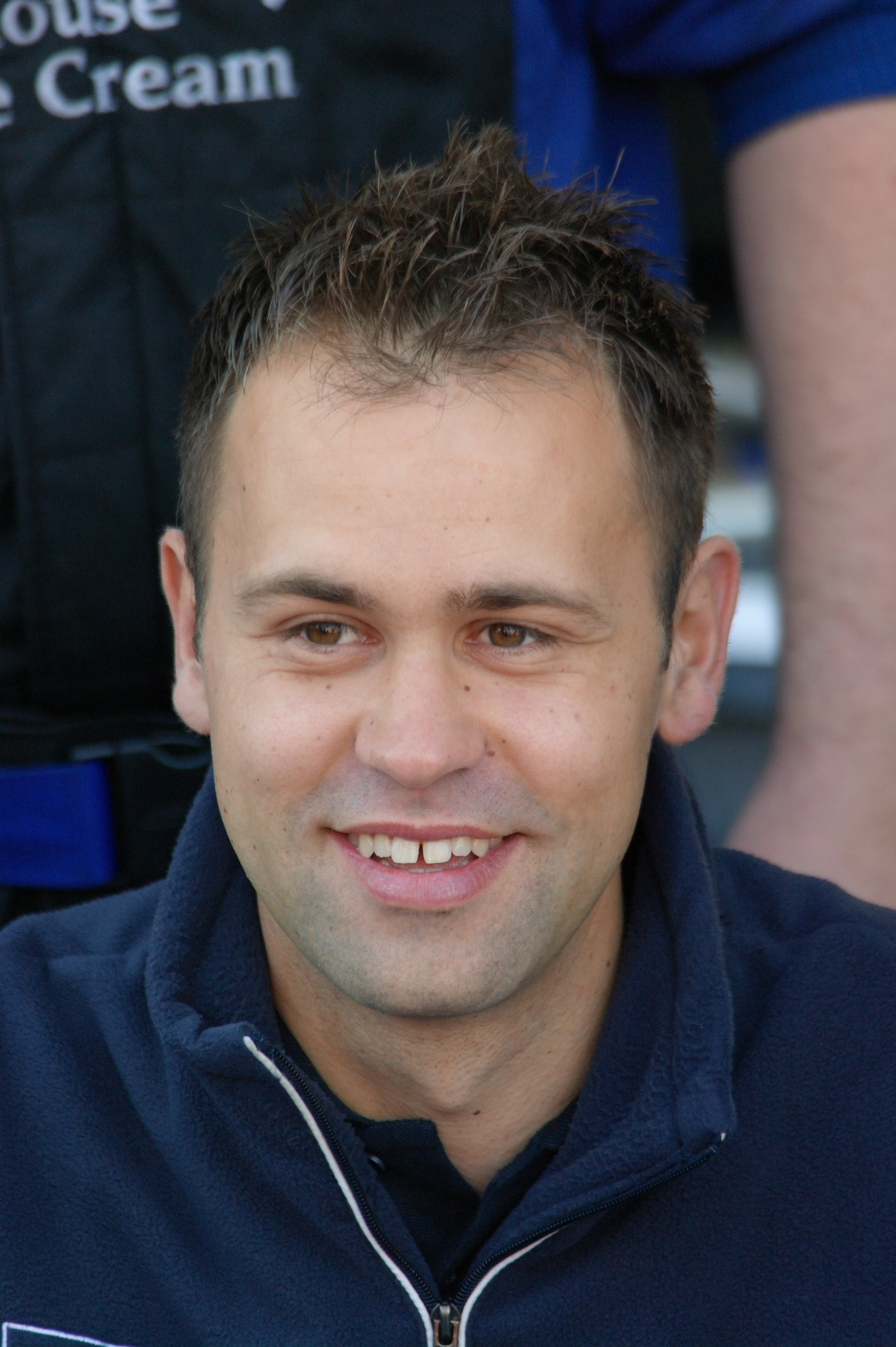
- Adam during the 2014 British GT Championship race weekend at Brands Hatch
- Nationality: (United Kingdom) British
- Born: 4 September 1984 (age 42) Kirkcaldy, Scotland

British GT Championship career
- Debut season: 2011
- Current team: GBR Stratton Motorsport
- Categorisation: FIA Gold (until 2017); FIA Platinum (2018–)
- Car number: 97
- Former teams: Optimum Motorsport, TF Sport, Garage 59, Beechdean AMR, 2 Seas Motorsport, Blackthorn
- Starts: 122
- Wins: 20
- Poles: 20
- Fastest laps: 7
- Best finish: 1st in 2015, 2016, 2018, 2019

24 Hours of Le Mans career
- Years: 2016, 2017, 2018, 2019
- Teams: Aston Martin Racing
- Best finish: 17th (2017)
- Class wins: 1 (2017)

Previous series
- 2015–2017 2016 2015 2015 2014 2014 2013 2012–2017 2010 2009 2006–08 2004–05 2003 2003: World Endurance Championship; IMSA SportsCar Championship; European Le Mans Series; 24H Series; United SportsCar Championship; Blancpain Sprint Series; World Endurance Championship; Blancpain Endurance Cup; Ginetta G50 Cup; BTCC; SEAT Cupra Championship; Clio Cup GB; Formula Renault UK; Formula Ford Zetec Scotland

Championship titles
- 2017 2015–16, 18-19 2007–08 2005 2004: Blancpain Endurance Cup ProAm; British GT SEAT Cupra Championship; Clio Cup UK; Clio UK Winter Series

Awards
- 2016: Sunoco Whelen Challenge

Jonathan Robert Adam (born 4 September 1984 in Lochgelly, Fife) is a British racing driver and a factory driver for Aston Martin Racing. He was the champion of the SEAT Cupra Championship in two of its six seasons – winning in 2007 and in 2008. He also won the 2005 Elf Renault Clio Cup. He competed in the British Touring Car Championship in 2009 and currently competes in the FIA World Endurance Championship, British GT Championship, winning the 2015, 2016, 2018 and 2019 championships. He also won the LMGTE Pro class at the 2017 24 Hours of Le Mans.

== Career history ==
=== Early career ===
Adam began his career in karting, winning the 1999 Scottish Kart TKM challenge, and he finished fifth overall in the British Kart Championship (100 National) in 2002, and also went on to win the "Summerlee" championship at Larkhall.

In 2003, Adam finished third overall in the Scottish Formula Ford Zetec Championship, however he was second and five points behind Ryan Cannon in the Newcomer's Cup.

=== Clio Cup ===
Adam moved into the Renault Clio Cup in 2004, and after a season long battle with Ed Pead and Paul Rivett, it was the latter who took the title after Adam failed to finish in the penultimate race at Donington Park. He eventually finished third in the championship.

Adam then took four podiums, including a win, to become the Clio Cup Winter series champion.

2005 saw Adam resume his battle with Pead in the Clios, which took the championship down to the final meeting of the year at Donington Park, where Adam clinched it with a race to spare.

=== SEAT Cupra Championship ===
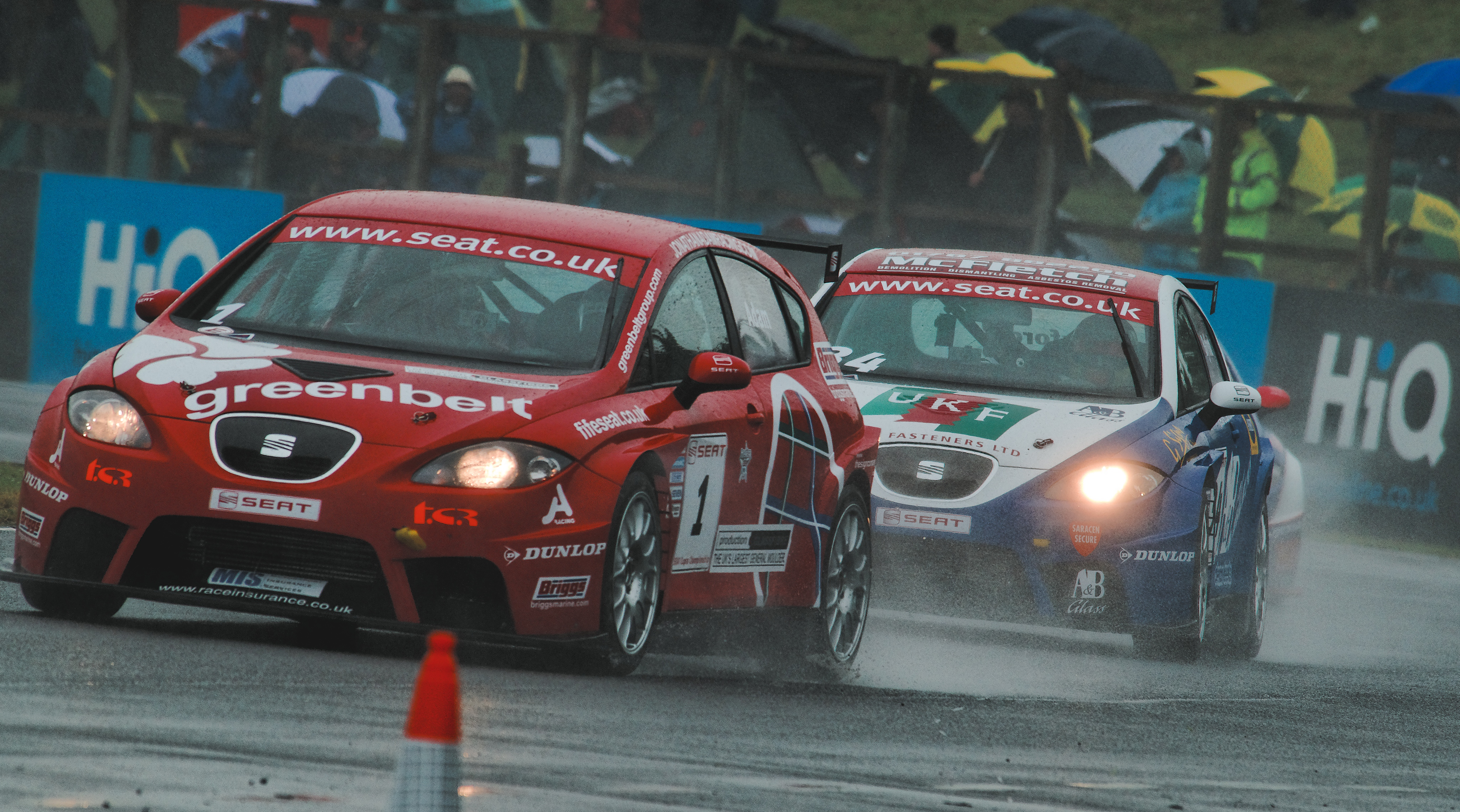
Adam leads Martin Byford at the Croft round of the 2008 SEAT Cupra Championship.

Adam competed in another one-makes series in 2006, this time the SEAT Cupra Championship. He finished third, in a competitive series with would-be 2007 BTCC driver Mat Jackson and Alan Blencowe finishing ahead of him in the standings.

In 2007, Adam continued in the championship, driving in the top Leon Cupra R class, and sealed the title with three races to go at his home circuit of Knockhill, taking nine wins and 17 podium from the 20 races. He remains in the SEAT Cupra Championship for 2008. At Knockhill, he took a double hat-trick – two poles, two victories, teo fastest laps, although he remained 14 points behind championship leader Robert Lawson. He eventually won the championship for the second year in succession.

=== British Touring Car Championship ===
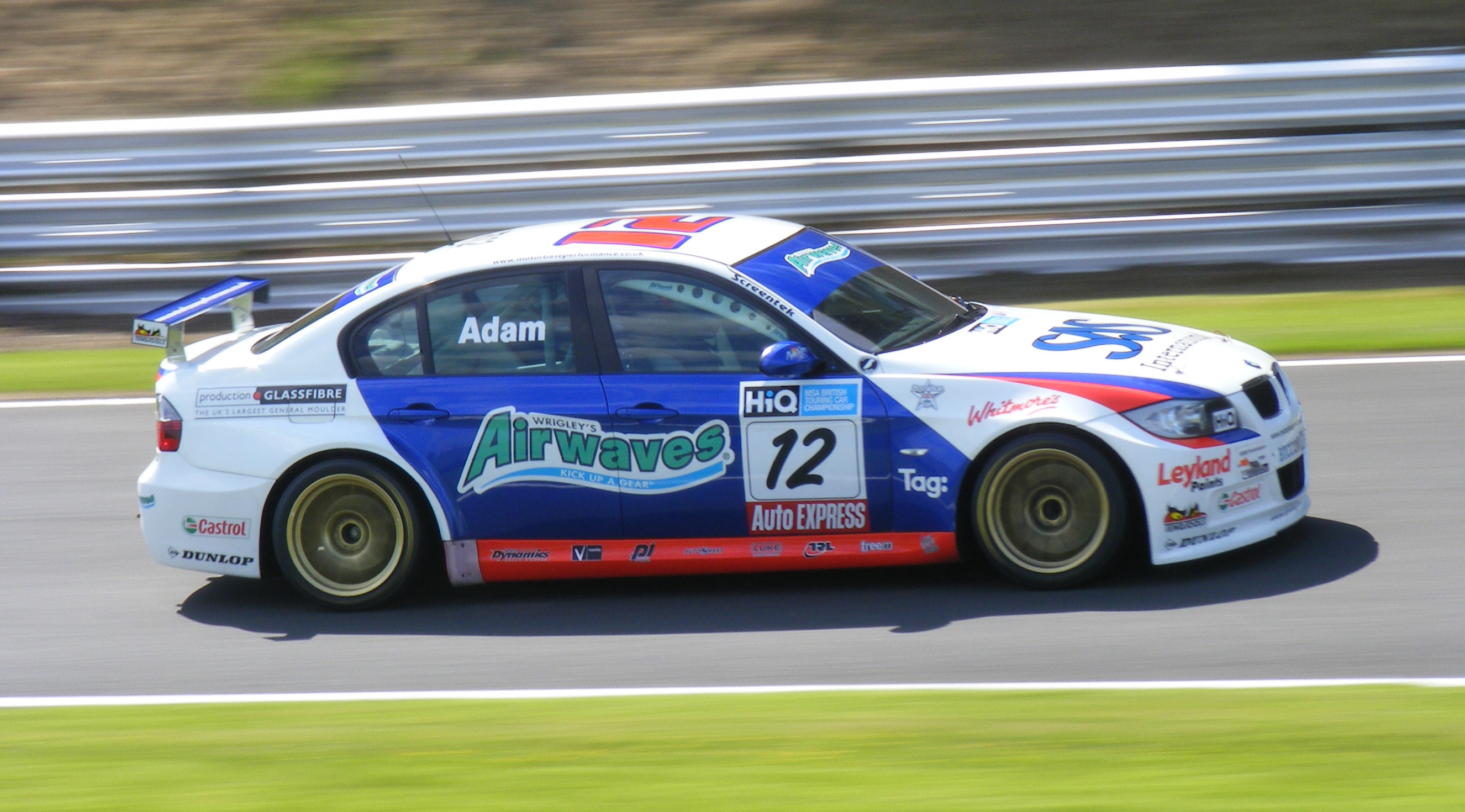
Adam competing at Oulton Park in 2009.

Adam joined the British Touring Car Championship in 2009, driving a BMW 320si for Motorbase Performance. At the first round of the season at Brands Hatch, he was first past the chequered flag in the third race of the day, only to be penalised for hitting Jason Plato when he passed the 2001 champion for the lead.

=== British GT Championship ===
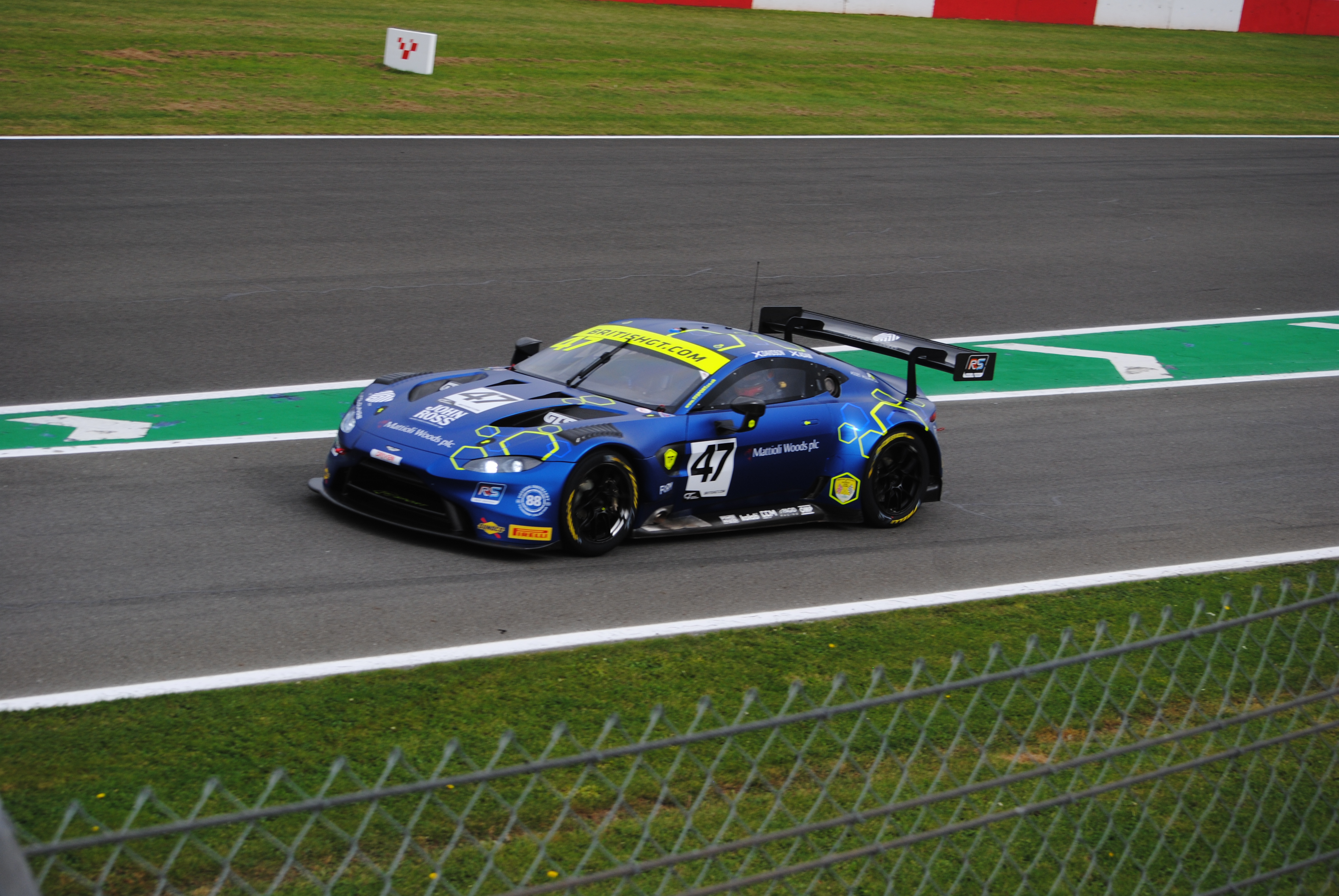
Adam and Davidson's TF Sport-run Aston Martin leaving the pits at Donington.

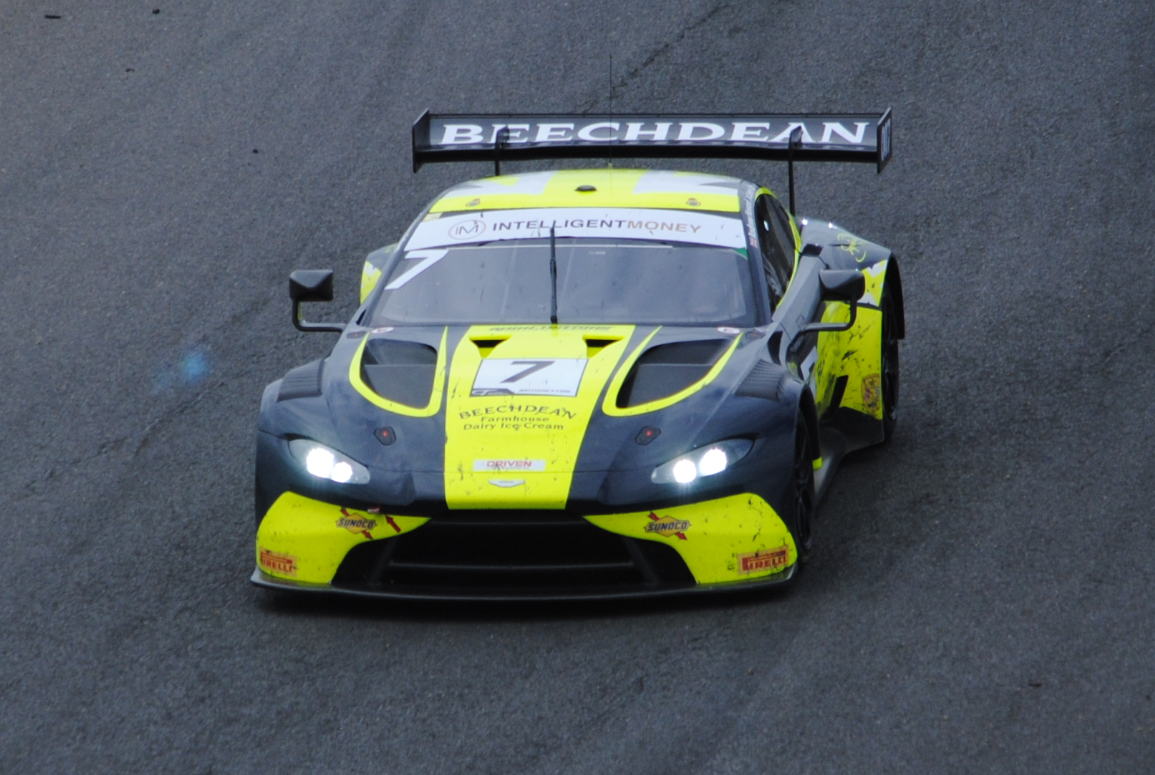
Adam and Howard's Beechdean Aston Martin at Brands Hatch.

Unable to find funding to continue in the BTCC, Adam moved to the British GT Championship to drive an Aston Martin DBRS9 for Beechdean Motorsport for 2011. Adam and co-driver Andrew Howard took their maiden win that season at Rockingham in wet conditions. They took pole position at the final race of the season at Silverstone and went on to take the win, allowing to finish the season third in the GT3 standings.

Adam once again teamed up with Howard for 2012, driving Beechdean's Aston Martin V12 Vantage GT3. They took the first win for the new car in the third race of the season at the Nürburgring.

From 2015 and onwards, Adam has finished in the top-three in the GT3 Championship standings in the British GT Championship, winning the title in 2015, 2016, 2018, and 2019.

=== 24 Hours of Le Mans ===
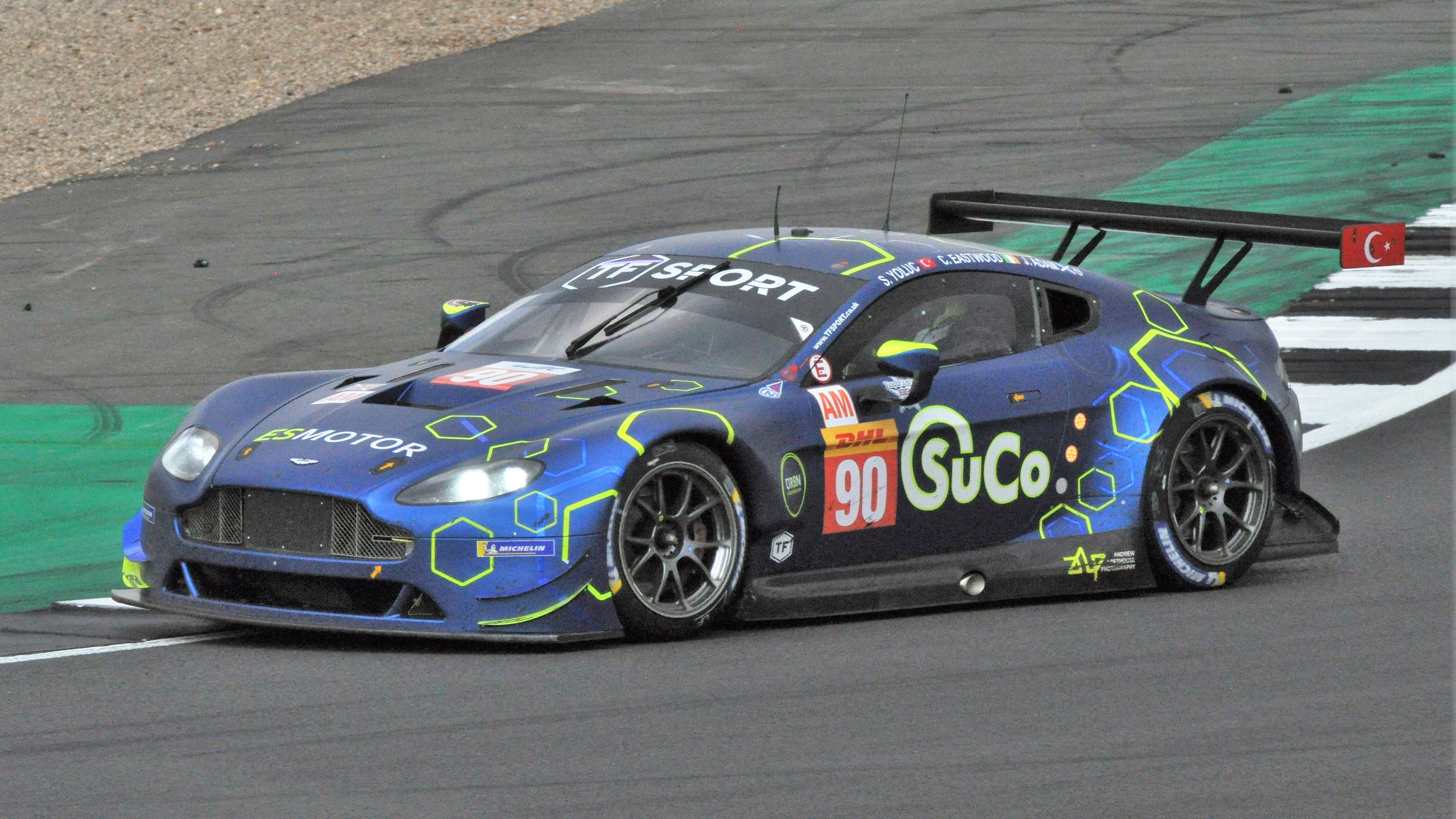
Adam driving in the 2018 6 Hours of Silverstone.

After a sixth-place finish at the 2016 race, Adam won the LMGTE Pro class at the 2017 24 Hours of Le Mans in the No. 97 Aston Martin Vantage GTE alongside Darren Turner and Daniel Serra. He overtook the stricken No. 63 Corvette of Jordan Taylor, Antonio García, and Jan Magnussen in the final two laps of the race to take the win.

Adam became a two time class winner at Le Mans in 2020, but this time in the GTE Am class with TF Sport.

== Racing record ==
=== Racing career summary ===
Season	Series	Team	Races	Wins	Poles	F/Laps	Podiums	Points	Position
2003	Formula Renault UK	Team DFR	6	0	0	0	0	13	33th
2003	Scottish Formula Ford Zetec Championship								3rd
2004	Renault Clio Cup UK	Total Control Racing	20	6	6	6	12	417	3rd
2004	Renault Clio Cup UK Winter Series	Total Control Racing	4	2	4	3	4		1st
2005	Renault Clio Cup UK	Total Control Racing	18	9	13	12	15	499	1st
2006	SEAT Cupra Championship	Total Control Racing	18	2	6	3	10	226	3rd
2007	SEAT Cupra Championship	Total Control Racing	20	9	10	9	17	302	1st
2008	SEAT Cupra Championship	Total Control Racing	19	9	11	7	14	301	1st
2009	British Touring Car Championship	Airwaves BMW	30	0	0	1	2	116	8th
2011	British GT Championship - GT3	Beechdean Motorsport	9	2	1	0	4	113.5	9th
2012	British GT Championship - GT3	Beechdean Motorsport	10	1	0	2	3	75	8th
2012	Blancpain Endurance Series - Pro-Am Cup	Beechdean-Aston Martin Racing	1	0	0	0	0	0	NC
2013	British GT Championship - GT3	Beechdean Motorsport	10	1	0	0	2	119.5	4th
2013	Blancpain Endurance Series - Pro-Am Cup	Beechdean-Aston Martin Racing	4	0	0	0	0	13	27th
2013	FIA World Endurance Championship - LMGTE Am	Aston Martin Racing	2	0	0	0	2	24	20th
2014	United SportsCar Championship - GTD	TRG-AMR North America	1	0	0	0	0	1	128th
2014	British GT Championship - GT3	Beechdean AMR	10	1	3	1	4	98	5th
2014	Blancpain Endurance Series - Pro-Am Cup	Beechdean AMR	1	0	0	0	0	0	NC
2014	Blancpain Sprint Series - Pro Cup	Beechdean AMR	4	0	0	0	2	36	9th
2014	Blancpain Endurance Series - Pro-Am Cup	Leonard Motorsport AMR	1	0	0	0	0	0	NC
2015	British GT Championship - GT3	Beechdean AMR	9	3	4	3	3	156.5	1st
2015	Blancpain Endurance Series - Pro Cup	Oman Racing Team	3	0	0	0	0	1	27th
2015	Blancpain Endurance Series - Pro-Am Cup	Oman Racing Team	1	0	0	0	0	4	27th
2015	FIA World Endurance Championship - LMGTE Pro	Aston Martin Racing	5	0	0	0	1	47	12th
2015	European Le Mans Series - LMGTE	Aston Martin Racing	1	0	0	0	1	18	13th
2015	24 Hours of Nürburgring - SP9	Aston Martin Racing	1	0	0	0	0	N/A	DNF
2016	IMSA SportsCar Championship - P	Action Express Racing	1	0	0	0	0	26	28th
2016	British GT Championship - GT3	TF Sport	9	2	2	0	4	163	1st
2016	Blancpain GT Series Endurance Cup - Pro-Am Cup	Oman Racing Team	5	0	1	0	1	53	4th
2016	FIA World Endurance Championship - LMGTE Pro	Aston Martin Racing	3	0	1	0	1	56	10th
2016	24 Hours of Le Mans - LMGTE Pro	Aston Martin Racing	1	0	0	0	0	N/A	6th
2016	24 Hours of Nürburgring - SP9	Aston Martin Racing	1	0	0	0	0	N/A	DNF
2017	British GT Championship - GT3	TF Sport	10	2	1	0	4	150.5	3rd
2017	Blancpain GT Series Endurance Cup - Pro-Am Cup	Oman Racing Team with TF Sport	5	1	2	1	4	116	1st
2017	FIA World Endurance Championship - LMGTE Pro	Aston Martin Racing	9	1	1	0	1	101	7th
2017	24 Hours of Le Mans - LMGTE Pro	Aston Martin Racing	1	1	1	0	1	N/A	1st
2018	British GT Championship - GT3	Optimum Motorsport	8	2	3	0	4	167.5	1st
2018	24 Hours of Le Mans - LMGTE Pro	Aston Martin Racing	1	0	0	0	0	N/A	13th
2018–19	FIA World Endurance Championship - LMGTE Pro	Aston Martin Racing	3	0	0	0	0	16	20th
2018–19	FIA World Endurance Championship - LMGTE Am	TF Sport	4	0	0	0	2	50	12th
2019	British GT Championship - GT3	TF Sport	9	2	2	0	2	131	1st
2019	Blancpain GT Series Endurance Cup	Garage 59	5	0	0	0	0	2	33rd
2019	International GT Open	Optimum Motorsport	2	1	0	0	1	20	14th
2019	24 Hours of Le Mans - LMGTE Pro	Aston Martin Racing	1	0	0	0	0	N/A	12th
2019–20	FIA World Endurance Championship - LMGTE Am	TF Sport	8	4	2	0	5	154	2nd
2020	British GT Championship - GT3	Beechdean AMR	1	0	0	0	0	3	17th
2020	British GT Championship - GT3	Garage 59	1	0	0	0	0	3	17th
2020	Blancpain GT Series Endurance Cup - Pro-Am Cup	Garage 59	3	1	0	0	2	59	4th
2020	24 Hours of Le Mans - LMGTE Am	TF Sport	1	1	0	0	1	N/A	1st
2021	Asian Le Mans Series - GT	Oman Racing Team with TF Sport	4	0	0	0	0	24	8th
2021	European Le Mans Series - LMGTE	TF Sport	1	0	0	0	0	4	22nd
2021	British GT Championship - GT3	Beechdean AMR	8	0	1	0	2	111.5	6th
2021	GT World Challenge Europe Endurance Cup - Pro-Am Cup	Garage 59	4	1	1	0	2	47	9th
2021	GT World Challenge Europe Sprint Cup - Pro-Am Cup	Garage 59	10	1	3	2	7	101.5	4th
2022	IMSA SportsCar Championship - GTD	Magnus Racing	1	0	0	0	1	342	49th
2022	Asian Le Mans Series - GT	TF Sport	4	0	2	0	0	13	10th
2022	European Le Mans Series - LMGTE	Oman Racing Team with TF Sport	6	0	0	1	1	37	13th
2022	British GT Championship - GT3	2 Seas Motorsport	3	0	0	0	1	0	NC†
2023	Asian Le Mans Series - GT	TF Sport	4	0	0	0	0	10	14th
2023	European Le Mans Series - LMGTE	TF Sport	6	0	0	0	1	28	9th
2023	British GT Championship - GT3	2 Seas Motorsport	8	3	1	0	5	162	3rd
2023–24	Asian Le Mans Series - GT	TF Sport	5	0	0	0	1	26	11th
2024	European Le Mans Series - LMGT3	Grid Motorsport by TF	6	0	0	1	1	44	11th
2024	British GT Championship - GT3	Blackthorn	8	0	0	0	1	53	9th
2024–25	Asian Le Mans Series - GT	Blackthorn	4	0	0	0	0	0	28th
2025	British GT Championship - GT3	Blackthorn	9	1	1	0	2	130	6th
2025–26	Asian Le Mans Series - GT	Ecurie Ecosse Blackthorn	6	1	0	0	2	47	8th
2026	FIA World Endurance Championship - LMGT3	Heart of Racing Team	8	0	2	0	3	69	7th
2026	British GT Championship - GT4	GBR Stratton Motorsport	2	0	0	0	0	6	17th
2026	GT World Challenge Europe Endurance Cup	Ecurie Ecosse Blackthorn	3	0	0	0	0	0	NC
2026	International GT Open	Blackthorn	5	0	1	0	0	14	25th
2026–27	Asian Le Mans Series - GT3	Ecurie Ecosse Blackthorn							

† As Adam was a guest driver, he was ineligible for points.

=== Complete British Touring Car Championship results ===
(key) (Races in bold indicate pole position – 1 point awarded just in first race) (Races in italics indicate fastest lap – 1 point awarded all races) (* signifies that driver lead race for at least one lap – 1 point awarded all races)

Year	Team	Car	1	2	3	4	5	6	7	8	9	10	11	12	13	14	15	16	17	18	19	20	21	22	23	24	25	26	27	28	29	30	DC	Pts
2009	Airwaves BMW	BMW 320si	BRH; 1 Ret	BRH; 2; 9	BRH; 3; 2*	THR; 1; 12	THR; 2; 11	THR; 3; 12	DON; 1; 6	DON; 2; 7	DON; 3; 13	OUL; 1; 3	OUL; 2; 5	OUL; 3; 13	CRO; 1; 7	CRO; 2 Ret	CRO; 3; 9	SNE; 1; 4	SNE; 2; 6	SNE; 3; 8	KNO; 1; 5	KNO; 2; 7	KNO; 3 Ret	SIL; 1; 8	SIL; 2; 7	SIL; 3; 6	ROC; 1; 5*	ROC; 2; 5	ROC; 3; 6	BRH; 1; 7	BRH; 2; 5	BRH; 3; 8	8th	116

=== Complete British GT Championship results ===
(key) (Races in bold indicate pole position) (Races in italics indicate fastest lap)

Year	Team	Car	Class	1	2	3	4	5	6	7	8	9	10	DC	Points
2011	Beechdean Motorsport	Aston Martin DBRS9	GT3	OUL; 1; 3	OUL; 2 DNS	SNE; 1; 7	BRH; 1; 20	SPA; 1; 5	SPA; 2; 3	ROC; 1; 1	ROC; 2; 9	DON; 1 Ret	**SIL**; **1**; 1	5th	113.5
2012	Beechdean Motorsport	Aston Martin V12 Vantage GT3	GT3	OUL; 1; 9	OUL; 2; 15	NUR; 1; 1	NUR; 2; 7	ROC; 1 Ret	BRH; 1; 2	SNE; 1; 3	SNE; 2 Ret	SIL; 1; 15	DON; 1 Ret	8th	75
2013	Beechdean Motorsport	Aston Martin V12 Vantage GT3	GT3	OUL; 1 Ret	OUL; 2; 22†	ROC; 1; 7	SIL; 1; 2	SNE; 1; 4	SNE; 2; 5	BRH; 1; 1	ZAN; 1; 11	ZAN; 2; 4	DON; 1; 4	4th	119.5
2014	Beechdean-AMR	Aston Martin V12 Vantage GT3	GT3	OUL; 1; 3	OUL; 2; 3	ROC; 1; 5	**SIL**; **1**; 2	SNE; 1; 6	**SNE**; **2**; 1	SPA; 1; 9	SPA; 2; 15	**BRH**; **1**; 16	DON; 1 Ret	5th	98
2015	Beechdean-AMR	Aston Martin V12 Vantage GT3	GT3	OUL; 1 Ret	**OUL**; **2**; 1	ROC; 1; 7	**SIL**; **1**; 5	**SPA**; **1**; 1	**BRH**; **1**; 4	SNE; 1; 4	SNE; 2; 1	DON; 1; 5		1st	156.5
2016	TF Sport	Aston Martin V12 Vantage GT3	GT3	BRH; 1; 1	**ROC**; **1**; 1	OUL; 1; 5	OUL; 2; 4	SIL; 1 Ret	SPA; 1; 7	SNE; 1; 4	SNE; 2; 2	**DON**; **1**; 2		1st	163
2017	TF Sport	Aston Martin V12 Vantage GT3	GT3	OUL; 1; 3	OUL; 2; 2	**ROC**; **1**; 8	SNE; 1; 5	SNE; 2; 1	SIL; 1; 9	SPA; 1; 9	SPA; 2; 6	BRH; 1; 4	DON; 1; 1	3rd	150.5
2018	Optimum Motorsport	Aston Martin V12 Vantage GT3	GT3	**OUL**; **1**; 1	OUL; 2 DNS	ROC; 1; 4	SNE; 1; 4	SNE; 2; 4	SIL; 1; 3	**SPA**; **1**; 3	**BRH**; **1**; 1	DON; 1; 4		1st	167.5
2019	TF Sport	Aston Martin Vantage AMR GT3	GT3	OUL; 1; 7	OUL; 2; 15†	SNE; 1; 3	SNE; 2; 5	**SIL**; **1**; 9	**DON**; **1**; 1	SPA; 1; 8	BRH; 1; 1	DON; 1; 5		1st	131
2020	Beechdean AMR	Aston Martin Vantage AMR GT3	GT3	OUL; 1	OUL; 2	DON; 1	DON; 2	BRH; 1; 9	DON; 1	SNE; 1	SNE; 2			17th	3
2020	Garage 59	Aston Martin Vantage AMR GT3	GT3									SIL; 1 Ret		17th	3
2021	Beechdean AMR	Aston Martin Vantage AMR GT3	GT3	**BRH**; **1**; 2	SIL; 1; 6	DON; 1; 3	SPA; 1 WD	SNE; 1; 4	SNE; 2; 6	OUL; 1; 8	OUL; 2; 8	DON; 1; 8		6th	111.5
2022	2 Seas Motorsport	Mercedes-AMG GT3 Evo	GT3	OUL; 1	OUL; 2	SIL; 1; 5	DON; 1	SNE; 1; 28	SNE; 2; 3	SPA; 1	BRH; 1	DON; 1		NC‡	0‡
2023	2 Seas Motorsport	Mercedes-AMG GT3 Evo	GT3	**OUL**; **1**; 1	OUL; 2; 4	SIL; 1; 11	DON; 1; 1	SNE; 1; 6	SNE; 2; 2	ALG; 1; 1	**BRH**; **1**; 3	DON; 1		3rd	162
2024	Blackthorn	Aston Martin Vantage AMR GT3	GT3	OUL; 1; 10	OUL; 2; 16									9th	53
2024	Blackthorn	Aston Martin Vantage AMR GT3 Evo	GT3			SIL; 1; 8	DON; 1; 9	SPA; 1 DSQ	SNE; 1; 11	SNE; 2; 5	DON; 1; 2	BRH; 1		9th	53
2025	Blackthorn	Aston Martin Vantage AMR GT3 Evo	GT3	DON; 1; 11	SIL; 1; 4	OUL; 1; 3	OUL; 2; 4	**SPA**; **1**; 1	SNE; 1; 4	SNE; 2; 5	BRH; 1; 4	DON; 1; 11		6th	130
2026	GBR Stratton Motorsport	Aston Martin Vantage AMR GT4 Evo	GT4	SIL; 1	OUL; 1	OUL; 2	SPA; 1	SNE; 1; 20	SNE; 2; 20	DON; 1	BRH; 1			17th	6

^{†} Driver did not finish, but was classified as he completed 90% race distance. ^{‡} As Adam was a guest driver, he was ineligible to score points.

=== Complete GT World Challenge Europe results ===
(key) (Races in bold indicate pole position; races in italics indicate fastest lap)

==== GT World Challenge Europe Endurance Cup ====
Year	Team	Car	Class	1	2	3	4	5	6	7	Pos.	Points
2012	Beechdean-Aston Martin Racing	Aston Martin V12 Vantage GT3	Pro-Am	MNZ	SIL	LEC	SPA; Ret	NÜR	NAV		NC	0
2013	Beechdean-Aston Martin Racing	Aston Martin V12 Vantage GT3	Pro-Am	MNZ; 11	SIL; 43	LEC; 56	SPA; 10	NÜR			27th	13
2014	Leonard Motorsport AMR	Aston Martin V12 Vantage GT3	Pro	MNZ	SIL; 23	LEC					NC	0
2014	Beechdean AMR	Aston Martin V12 Vantage GT3	Pro-Am				SPA; 6H; 57	SPA; 12H; 56	SPA; 24H; Ret	NÜR	NC	0
2015	Oman Racing Team	Aston Martin V12 Vantage GT3	Pro	MNZ; 28	SIL; 19	LEC; 16					27th	1
2015	Oman Racing Team	Aston Martin V12 Vantage GT3	Pro-Am				SPA; 6H; 24	SPA; 12H; 17	SPA; 24H; 30	NÜR	27th	4
2016	Oman Racing Team	Aston Martin V12 Vantage GT3	Pro-Am	MNZ; 13	SIL; 18	LEC; 33	SPA; 6H; 14	SPA; 12H; 44	SPA; 24H; 24	**NÜR**; 26	4th	53
2017	Oman Racing Team with TF Sport	Aston Martin V12 Vantage GT3	Pro-Am	**MNZ**; 7	SIL; 21	LEC; 14	SPA; 6H; 9	SPA; 12H; 14	**SPA**; **24H**; 15	CAT; 25	1st	116
2019	Garage 59	Aston Martin Vantage AMR GT3	Pro	MNZ; 9	SIL; Ret	LEC; Ret	SPA; 6H; 71	SPA; 12H; 71	SPA; 24H; Ret	CAT; Ret	33rd	2
2020	Garage 59	Aston Martin Vantage AMR GT3	Pro-Am	IMO; 13	NÜR; 33	SPA; 6H; 17	SPA; 12H; 24	SPA; 24H; 20	LEC		4th	59
2021	Garage 59	Aston Martin Vantage AMR GT3	Pro-Am	MNZ; 14	**LEC**; 25	SPA; 6H	SPA; 12H	SPA; 24H	NÜR; 31	CAT; Ret	9th	47
2026	Ecurie Ecosse Blackthorn	Aston Martin Vantage AMR GT3 Evo	Bronze	LEC; 41	MNZ; 9	SPA; 6H; 27	SPA; 12H; 41	SPA; 24H; 31	NÜR	ALG	11th	33

==== GT World Challenge Europe Sprint Cup ====
Year	Team	Car	Class	1	2	3	4	5	6	7	8	9	10	11	12	13	14	Pos.	Points	Ref
2014	Beechdean AMR	Aston Martin V12 Vantage GT3	Pro	NOG; QR	NOG; CR	BRH; QR	BRH; CR	ZAN; QR	ZAN; CR	SVK; QR	SVK; CR	ALG; QR	ALG; CR	ZOL; QR; 5	ZOL; CR; 5	BAK; QR; 2	BAK; CR; 2	9th	36	
2021	Garage 59	Aston Martin Vantage AMR GT3	Pro-Am	**MAG**; **1**; 22	**MAG**; **2**; 21	ZAN; 1; 23	ZAN; 2; 21	MIS; 1; 21	**MIS**; **2**; 18	BRH; 1; 23	BRH; 2; 24	VAL; 1 Ret	VAL; 2; 20					4th	101.5	

=== Complete FIA World Endurance Championship results ===
(key) (Races in bold indicate pole position; races in italics indicate fastest lap)

Year	Entrant	Class	Car	Engine	1	2	3	4	5	6	7	8	9	Rank	Points
2013	Aston Martin Racing	LMGTE Am	Aston Martin Vantage GTE	Aston Martin AM05 4.5 L V8	SIL	SPA	LMS	SÃO	COA	FUJ; 2	SHA; 3	BHR		20th	24
2015	Aston Martin Racing	LMGTE Pro	Aston Martin Vantage GTE	Aston Martin AM05 4.5 L V8	SIL	SPA	LMS	NÜR; 6	COA; 6	FUJ; 6	SHA; 6	BHR; 3		12th	47
2016	Aston Martin Racing	LMGTE Pro	Aston Martin Vantage GTE	Aston Martin AM05 4.5 L V8	SIL	SPA; 3	LMS; 6	NÜR	MEX	COA	FUJ	SHA	**BHR**; 5	10th	56
2017	Aston Martin Racing	LMGTE Pro	Aston Martin Vantage GTE	Aston Martin AM05 4.5 L V8	SIL; 7	SPA; 7	**LMS**; 1	NÜR; 7	MEX; Ret	COA; 5	FUJ; 6	SHA; 7	BHR; 6	7th	101
2018–19	Aston Martin Racing	LMGTE Pro	Aston Martin Vantage AMR	Aston Martin M177 4.0 L Turbo V8	SPA; 6	LMS; 13						LMS; 12		20th	16
2018–19	TF Sport	LMGTE Am	Aston Martin Vantage GTE	Aston Martin M177 4.0 L Turbo V8			SIL; 2	FUJ; 2	SHA; 8	SEB; 6	SPA			12th	50
2019–20	TF Sport	LMGTE Am	Aston Martin Vantage AMR	Aston Martin M177 4.0 L Turbo V8	**SIL**; 7	**FUJ**; 1	SHA; 1	BHR; Ret	COA; 1	SPA; 3	LMS; 1	BHR; 8		2nd	154
2026	Heart of Racing Team	LMGT3	Aston Martin Vantage AMR GT3 Evo	Aston Martin M177 4.0 L Turbo V8	IMO; 9	SPA; 13	LMS; 3	**SÃO**; 18	**COA**; 3	FUJ; Ret	CAT; 9	MNZ; 2		7th	79

=== Complete IMSA SportsCar Championship results ===
(key) (Races in bold indicate pole position; races in italics indicate fastest lap)

Year	Team	Class	Make	Engine	1	2	3	4	5	6	7	8	9	10	11	12	Rank	Points	Ref
2014	TRG-AMR North America	GTD	Aston Martin V12 Vantage GT3	Aston Martin 6.0 L V12	DAY; 26	SEB	LGA	DET	WGL	MOS	IMS	ELK	VIR	COA	PET		128th	1	
2016	Action Express Racing	P	Coyote Corvette DP	Chevrolet 5.5L V8	DAY; 6	SEB	LBH	LGA	DET	WGL	MOS	ELK	COA	PET			28th	26	
2022	Magnus Racing	GTD	Aston Martin Vantage AMR GT3	Aston Martin 4.0 L Turbo V8	DAY; 2	SEB	LBH	LGA	MDO	DET	WGL	MOS	LIM	ELK	VIR	PET	49th	342	

=== Complete European Le Mans Series results ===
(key) (Races in bold indicate pole position; races in italics indicate fastest lap)

Year	Entrant	Class	Chassis	Engine	1	2	3	4	5	6	Rank	Points
2015	Aston Martin Racing	LMGTE	Aston Martin Vantage GTE	Aston Martin 4.5 L V8	SIL	IMO	RBR	LEC	EST; 2		13th	18
2021	TF Sport	LMGTE	Aston Martin Vantage AMR	Aston Martin 4.0 L Turbo V8	CAT	RBR; 8	LEC	MNZ	SPA	ALG	22nd	4
2022	Oman Racing with TF Sport	LMGTE	Aston Martin Vantage AMR	Aston Martin 4.0 L Turbo V8	LEC; 6	IMO; 2	MNZ; 11	CAT; 7	SPA; 8	ALG; 10	13th	37
2023	TF Sport	LMGTE	Aston Martin Vantage AMR	Aston Martin 4.0 L Turbo V8	CAT; 9	LEC; 3	ARA; 11	SPA; 9	ALG; 10	ALG; 6	9th	28
2024	Grid Motorsport by TF	LMGT3	Aston Martin Vantage AMR GT3 Evo	Aston Martin 4.0 L Turbo V8	CAT; 7	LEC; 7	IMO; 5†	SPA; 5	MUG; 2	ALG; 8	11th	44

^{†} Adam was not awarded points as he did not complete the minimum drive time.

=== Complete 24 Hours of Nürburgring results ===
Year	Team	Co-Drivers	Car	Class	Laps	Pos.	Class Pos.
2015	(United Kingdom) Aston Martin Racing	(Austria) Mathias Lauda (Germany) Stefan Mücke (New Zealand) Richie Stanaway	Aston Martin V12 Vantage GT3	SP9	94	DNF	DNF
2016	(United Kingdom) Aston Martin Racing	(Austria) Mathias Lauda (Brazil) Fernando Rees (New Zealand) Richie Stanaway	Aston Martin V12 Vantage GT3	SP9	17	DNF	DNF

=== Complete 24 Hours of Le Mans results ===
Year	Team	Co-Drivers	Car	Class	Laps	Pos.	Class Pos.
2016	(United Kingdom) Aston Martin Racing	(Brazil) Fernando Rees (New Zealand) Richie Stanaway	Aston Martin Vantage GTE	GTE; Pro	337	24th	6th
2017	(United Kingdom) Aston Martin Racing	(Brazil) Daniel Serra (United Kingdom) Darren Turner	Aston Martin Vantage GTE	GTE; Pro	340	17th	**1st**
2018	(United Kingdom) Aston Martin Racing	(United Kingdom) Alex Lynn (Belgium) Maxime Martin	Aston Martin Vantage AMR	GTE; Pro	327	37th	13th
2019	(United Kingdom) Aston Martin Racing	(United Kingdom) Alex Lynn (Belgium) Maxime Martin	Aston Martin Vantage AMR	GTE; Pro	325	44th	12th
2020	(United Kingdom) TF Sport	(Republic of Ireland) Charlie Eastwood (Turkey) Salih Yoluç	Aston Martin Vantage AMR	GTE; Am	339	24th	**1st**
2026	(United States) Heart of Racing Team	(Brazil) Eduardo Barrichello (United States) Gray Newell	Aston Martin Vantage AMR GT3 Evo	LMGT3	335	35th	**3rd**

=== Complete Asian Le Mans Series results ===
(key) (Races in bold indicate pole position; results in italics indicate fastest lap)

Year	Entrant	Class	Chassis	Engine	1	2	3	4	5	6	Pos.	Points
2021	Oman Racing Team with TF Sport	GT	Aston Martin Vantage AMR GT3	Aston Martin 4.0 L Turbo V8	DUB; 1; 7	DUB; 2; 7	ABU; 1 Ret	ABU; 2; 4			8th	24
2022	TF Sport	GT	Aston Martin Vantage AMR GT3	Aston Martin 4.0 L Turbo V8	DUB; 1; 9	**DUB**; **2**; 11	**ABU**; **1**; 6	ABU; 2; 11			10th	13
2023	TF Sport	GT	Aston Martin Vantage AMR GT3	Aston Martin 4.0 L Turbo V8	DUB; 1; 11	DUB; 2; 14	ABU; 1; 5	ABU; 2; 11			14th	10
2023–24	TF Sport	GT	Aston Martin Vantage AMR GT3	Aston Martin 4.0 L Turbo V8	SEP; 1; 15	SEP; 2; 9	DUB; 10	ABU; 1; 6	ABU; 2; 3		11th	26
2024–25	Blackthorn	GT	Aston Martin Vantage AMR GT3 Evo	Aston Martin 4.0 L Turbo V8	SEP; 1	SEP; 2	DUB; 1; 14	DUB; 2; 14	ABU; 1; 21	ABU; 2; 15	28th	0
2025–26	Ecurie Ecosse Blackthorn	GT	Aston Martin Vantage AMR GT3 Evo	Aston Martin 4.0 L Turbo V8	SEP; 1; 3	SEP; 2; 13	DUB; 1 Ret	DUB; 2; 10	ABU; 1; 8	ABU; 2; 1	8th	47

Sporting positions
Preceded by Paul Rivett	Renault Clio Cup UK Winter Series; Champion; 2004	Succeeded by Matt Allison
Preceded by Paul Rivett	Renault Clio Cup United Kingdom; Champion; 2005	Succeeded by Tom Onslow-Cole
Preceded by Mat Jackson	SEAT Cupra Championship; Champion; 2007–2008	Succeeded by None (Series ended)
Preceded by Marco Attard	British GT Championship; Champion; 2015-2016; With: Andrew Howard (2015) & Derek Johnston (2016)	Succeeded by Seb Morris; Rick Parfitt Jr.
Preceded by Marco Attard	British GT Championship; Pro-Am Champion; 2015-2016; With: Andrew Howard (2015) & Derek Johnston (2016)	Succeeded by Seb Morris; Rick Parfitt Jr.
Preceded by Alessandro Bonacini; Michał Broniszewski; Andrea Rizzoli	Blancpain GT Series Endurance Cup; Pro-Am Champion; 2017; With: Ahmad Al Harthy	Succeeded by Lewis Williamson; Nick Leventis; Chris Buncombe
Preceded by Seb Morris; Rick Parfitt Jr.	British GT Championship; Champion; 2018-2019; With: Flick Haigh (2018) & Graham Davidson (2019)	Succeeded by Rob Collard; Sandy Mitchell
Preceded by Seb Morris; Rick Parfitt Jr.	British GT Championship; Pro-Am Champion; 2018; With: Flick Haigh	Succeeded by Jonny Cocker; Sam De Haan
