= 2005 Renault Clio Cup United Kingdom =

The 2005 Elf Renault Clio Cup United Kingdom season began at Donington Park on 10 April and finished after 18 races over 9 events at Brands Hatch on 2 October. The Championship was won by Jonathan Adam driving for Total Control Racing.

== Teams & Drivers ==
All competitors raced in Renault Clio Cup 182s. All teams and drivers were British-registered.

Team	No.	Drivers	Rounds
Boulevard Team Racing	1	Ed Pead	All
Boulevard Team Racing	7	Michael Doyle	All
Boulevard Team Racing	8	Fulvio Mussi	All
Boulevard Team Racing	11	Steven Hunter	All
Boulevard Team Racing	27	Martin Johnson	All
Boulevard Team Racing	40	Matt Allison	All
Mardi Gras Motorsport	2	Stephen Colbert	All
Total Control Racing	3	Nick Adcock	All
Total Control Racing	4	Jonathan Adam	All
Total Control Racing	5	Tom Onslow-Cole	All
Total Control Racing	17	Ben Winrow	All
Bardon Aggregates	9	Amy Chambers	All
Driver with SRE Motorsport	10	Dave Loudoun	1-5, 8-9
Driver with SRE Motorsport	38	Steve Wood	All
BNH Racing	13	Martin Perrett	1-2, 4, 7
BNH Racing	13	Brad Perrett	3, 5-6, 8-9
SRE Motorsport	15	Neil Waterworth	4-9
MSP Racing	33	Matthew Speakman	3-4
Tracsport	28	Annabel Meade	3-5
Tracsport	28	John Ingram	6
Tracsport	28	Mark Speller	8
Tracsport	55	John Gaw	1-6, 8-9
Team Pyro	99	Mark Hunt	1-3

== Season Calendar ==
All races were held in the United Kingdom.

Round		Circuit	Date	Pole position	Fastest lap	Winning driver	Winning team
1	R1	Donington Park National	9 April	Matt Allison	Jonathan Adam	Matt Allison	Boulevard Team Racing
1	R2	Donington Park National	10 April	Jonathan Adam	Ed Pead	Tom Onslow-Cole	Total Control Racing
2	R3	Thruxton Circuit, Hampshire	30 April	Jonathan Adam	Jonathan Adam	Jonathan Adam	Total Control Racing
2	R4	Thruxton Circuit, Hampshire	1 May	Jonathan Adam	Nick Adcock	Ed Pead	Boulevard Team Racing
3	R5	Brands Hatch Indy, Kent	4 June	Jonathan Adam	Jonathan Adam	Jonathan Adam	Total Control Racing
3	R6	Brands Hatch Indy, Kent	5 June	Jonathan Adam	Jonathan Adam	Jonathan Adam	Total Control Racing
4	R7	Oulton Park Island, Cheshire	18 June	Jonathan Adam	Jonathan Adam	Jonathan Adam	Total Control Racing
4	R8	Oulton Park Island, Cheshire	19 June	Jonathan Adam	Jonathan Adam	Ed Pead	Boulevard Team Racing
5	R9	Croft Circuit, Yorkshire	16 July	Ed Pead	Nick Adcock	Ed Pead	Boulevard Team Racing
5	R10	Croft Circuit, Yorkshire	17 July	Jonathan Adam	Jonathan Adam	Jonathan Adam	Total Control Racing
6	R11	Snetterton Motor Racing Circuit, Norfolk	6 August	Tom Onslow-Cole	Ed Pead	Tom Onslow-Cole	Total Control Racing
6	R12	Snetterton Motor Racing Circuit, Norfolk	7 August	Jonathan Adam	Ed Pead	Tom Onslow-Cole	Total Control Racing
7	R13	Knockhill Racing Circuit, Fife	27 August	Ed Pead	Jonathan Adam	Ed Pead	Boulevard Team Racing
7	R14	Knockhill Racing Circuit, Fife	28 August	Ed Pead	Jonathan Adam	Ed Pead	Boulevard Team Racing
8	R15	Silverstone	17 September	Jonathan Adam	Nick Adcock	Jonathan Adam	Total Control Racing
8	R16	Silverstone	18 September	Jonathan Adam	Jonathan Adam	Jonathan Adam	Total Control Racing
9	R17	Brands Hatch GP, Kent	1 October	Jonathan Adam	Jonathan Adam	Jonathan Adam	Total Control Racing
9	R18	Brands Hatch GP, Kent	2 October	Jonathan Adam	Jonathan Adam	Jonathan Adam	Total Control Racing

== Drivers' Championship ==
Pos	Driver	DON		THR		BHI		OUL		CRO		SNE		KNO		SIL		BHGP		Pts
1	Jonathan Adam	3	2	1	4	1	1	1	2	Ret	1	2	11	2	2	1	1	1	1	499
2	Ed Pead	2	3	3	1	2	3	2	1	1	8	5	Ret	1	1	13	2	4	10	428
3	Matt Allison	1	Ret	5	2	3	2	3	5	6	5	7	2	Ret	4	3	3	3	3	382
4	Tom Onslow-Cole	DSQ	1	2	5	Ret	5	Ret	4	3	3	1	1	3	3	4	4	5	Ret	350
5	Nick Adcock	5	8	6	3	5	Ret	4	3	2	2	16	7	7	5	2	Ret	9	6	331
6	Ben Winrow	6	6	7	10	6	Ret	7	10	5	4	4	3	4	7	5	12	2	Ret	292
7	Stephen Colbert	4	4	4	8	4	4	5	6	4	Ret	Ret	4	6	8	9	7	7	Ret	282
8	Fulvio Mussi	Ret	5	DSQ	7	Ret	Ret	10	9	8	7	11	5	11	10	6	6	12	5	205
9	Steven Hunter	Ret	Ret	8	6	Ret	Ret	6	7	7	9	6	Ret	8	9	8	9	8	4	200
10	Martin Johnson	Ret	9	9	14	Ret	8	11	11	10	10	13	10	9	14	10	5	10	8	181
11	Neil Waterworth							8	14	9	6	3	6	5	6	Ret	8	6	7	180
12	Michael Doyle	DSQ	12	12	16	9	6	9	13	16	Ret	8	14	Ret	11	7	11	Ret	2	163
13	Dave Loudoun	7	11	13	11	10	7	12	12	Ret	12					12	13	14	9	134
14	Steve Wood	9	13	14	15	12	9	13	15	15	11	12	8	12	12	Ret	Ret	Ret	Ret	125
15	John Gaw	DSQ	7	Ret	9	7	Ret	14	8	12	Ret	9	13			Ret	10	11	Ret	115
16	Amy Chambers	10	Ret	15	17	14	10	15	17	13	14	15	15	13	15	11	Ret	DNS	Ret	100
17	Brad Perrett					11	12			11	13	10	12			Ret	Ret	13	NC	65
18	Martin Perrett	Ret	10	10	13			Ret	Ret					10	13					49
19	Mark Hunt	8	Ret	11	12	8	DSQ													47
20	Annabel Meade					15	13	16	16	14	15									37
21	Matthew Speakman					13	11	17	18											25
22	John Ingram											14	9							19
	Mark Speller															Ret	Ret			
Pos	Driver	DON		THR		BHI		OUL		CRO		SNE		KNO		SIL		BHGP		Pts
