= 2008 SEAT Cupra Championship =

British motor race season

The 2008 Blaupunkt SEAT Cupra Championship season was the sixth and final season of the SEAT Cupra Championship. It began on 30 March at Brands Hatch, and ended on 21 September at the same circuit, supporting rounds of the British Touring Car Championship.

== Teams and drivers ==
All drivers drove Mk2 SEAT Leóns.

Team	No.	Drivers	Rounds
Total Control Racing	1	(United Kingdom) Jonathan Adam	All
Total Control Racing	9	(United Kingdom) Jamie Ackers	All
Welch Motorsport	2	(United Kingdom) Carl Breeze	All
Welch Motorsport	7	(United Kingdom) Daniel Welch	All
Welch Motorsport	11	(United Kingdom) Jeremy Gumbley	All
JHR Developments	3	(United Kingdom) Andrew Herron	All
JHR Developments	25	(United Kingdom) Robert Lawson	All
Hardinge Machine Tools	8	(United Kingdom) James Appleby	All
JP Motorsport	12	(United Kingdom) Steve Mitchell	3–10
Daniels Motorsport	14	(United Kingdom) David Nye	1, 3–7, 9–10
Daniels Motorsport	42	(United Kingdom) David Green	All
DRM M-Sport	32	(United Kingdom) Daniel Rowbottom	All
Z Speed Racing	34	(United Kingdom) Martin Byford	All
Advent Motorsport	44	(Sweden) Freddy Nordström	All
Stringfellow Motorsport	69	(United Kingdom) Dan Stringfellow	1–3, 5–6

== Race calendar and results ==
Round		Circuit	Date	Pole position	Fastest lap	Winning driver	Winning team
1	R1	Brands Hatch Indy, Kent	30 March	(United Kingdom) Robert Lawson	(United Kingdom) Daniel Welch	(United Kingdom) Robert Lawson	JHR Developments
1	R2	Brands Hatch Indy, Kent	30 March	(United Kingdom) Martin Byford	(United Kingdom) Martin Byford	(United Kingdom) Martin Byford	Z Speed Racing
2	R3	Rockingham Motor Speedway	12 April	(United Kingdom) Jonathan Adam	(United Kingdom) Carl Breeze	(United Kingdom) Carl Breeze	Welch Motorsport
2	R4	Rockingham Motor Speedway	13 April	(United Kingdom) Robert Lawson	(United Kingdom) Martin Byford	(United Kingdom) Robert Lawson	JHR Developments
3	R5	Donington Park National	4 May	(United Kingdom) Robert Lawson	(United Kingdom) Robert Lawson	(United Kingdom) Robert Lawson	JHR Developments
3	R6	Donington Park National	4 May	(United Kingdom) Robert Lawson	(United Kingdom) Martin Byford	(United Kingdom) Robert Lawson	JHR Developments
4	R7	Thruxton Circuit, Hampshire	18 May	(United Kingdom) Jonathan Adam	(United Kingdom) Daniel Welch	(United Kingdom) Jonathan Adam	Total Control Racing
4	R8	Thruxton Circuit, Hampshire	18 May	(United Kingdom) Robert Lawson	(United Kingdom) Jonathan Adam	(United Kingdom) Jonathan Adam	Total Control Racing
5	R9	Croft Circuit, North Yorkshire	1 June	(United Kingdom) Robert Lawson	(United Kingdom) Andrew Herron	(United Kingdom) Robert Lawson	JHR Developments
5	R10	Croft Circuit, North Yorkshire	1 June	(United Kingdom) Jonathan Adam	Race cancelled due to adverse weather conditions. Run at Snetterton.		
6	R11	Snetterton Motor Racing Circuit, Norfolk	13 July	(United Kingdom) Robert Lawson	(United Kingdom) Martin Byford	(United Kingdom) Carl Breeze	Welch Motorsport
6	R12	Snetterton Motor Racing Circuit, Norfolk	13 July	(United Kingdom) Jonathan Adam	(United Kingdom) Robert Lawson	(United Kingdom) Jonathan Adam	Total Control Racing
6	R10	Snetterton Motor Racing Circuit, Norfolk	13 July	(United Kingdom) Jonathan Adam	(United Kingdom) Jonathan Adam	(United Kingdom) Jonathan Adam	Total Control Racing
7	R13	Oulton Park Island, Cheshire	26 July	(United Kingdom) Jonathan Adam	(United Kingdom) Jonathan Adam	(United Kingdom) Jonathan Adam	Total Control Racing
7	R14	Oulton Park Island, Cheshire	27 July	(United Kingdom) Jonathan Adam	(United Kingdom) Jonathan Adam	(United Kingdom) Jonathan Adam	Total Control Racing
8	R15	Knockhill Racing Circuit, Fife	17 August	(United Kingdom) Jonathan Adam	(United Kingdom) Jonathan Adam	(United Kingdom) Jonathan Adam	Total Control Racing
8	R16	Knockhill Racing Circuit, Fife	17 August	(United Kingdom) Jonathan Adam	(United Kingdom) Jonathan Adam	(United Kingdom) Jonathan Adam	Total Control Racing
9	R17	Silverstone Circuit, Northamptonshire	30 August	(United Kingdom) Jonathan Adam	(United Kingdom) Robert Lawson	(United Kingdom) Robert Lawson	JHR Developments
9	R18	Silverstone Circuit, Northamptonshire	31 August	(United Kingdom) Jonathan Adam	(United Kingdom) Jonathan Adam	(United Kingdom) Jonathan Adam	Total Control Racing
10	R19	Brands Hatch Indy, Kent	21 September	(United Kingdom) Robert Lawson	(United Kingdom) Martin Byford	(United Kingdom) Martin Byford	Z Speed Racing
10	R20	Brands Hatch Indy, Kent	21 September	(United Kingdom) Jonathan Adam	(United Kingdom) Martin Byford	(United Kingdom) Martin Byford	Z Speed Racing

== Championship standings ==
- Drivers' top 18 results count towards the championship.

Points system
**1st**	**2nd**	**3rd**	**4th**	**5th**	**6th**	**7th**	**8th**	**9th**	**10th**	**11th**	**12th**	Fastest lap	Best improvement on grid position
20	17	15	13	11	9	7	5	4	3	2	1	1	1

Pos	Driver	BHI		ROC		DON		THR		CRO		SNE			OUL		KNO		SIL		BHI		Pts
1	(United Kingdom) Jonathan Adam	9	3	**2**	4	7	Ret	**1**	1	3	**C**	5	**1**	**1**	**1**	**1**	**1**	**1**	**13**	**1**	3	**2**	301
2	(United Kingdom) Robert Lawson	**1**	2	4	**1**	**1**	**1**	3	**4**	**1**	C	**Ret**	2	2	2	2	2	2	1	7	**2**	4	295
3	(United Kingdom) Martin Byford	8	**1**	3	2	3	2	5	3	4	C	3	Ret	5	3	3	3	4	4	4	1	1	285
4	(United Kingdom) Carl Breeze	2	4	1	5	2	3	4	13	5	C	1	3	4	7	7	5	3	3	3	9	5	252
5	(United Kingdom) Andrew Herron	Ret	8	5	8	4	4	6	2	2	C	7	5	3	4	10	10	7	2	2	6	6	207
6	(United Kingdom) Daniel Welch	3	NC	10	3	5	5	2	7	7	C	12	4	Ret	Ret	4	4	5	10	5	4	3	183
7	(United Kingdom) Daniel Rowbottom	7	6	6	6	6	6	Ret	9	Ret	C	4	8	8	8	6	Ret	6	6	6	8	11	135
8	(Sweden) Freddy Nordström	10	5	Ret	7	Ret	Ret	11	5	8	C	2	6	Ret	11	9	9	9	5	8	5	7	112
9	(United Kingdom) Jeremy Gumbley	4	11	8	9	10	9	9	6	9	C	Ret	9	9	5	5	7	8	14	10	Ret	9	102
10	(United Kingdom) James Appleby	6	7	9	11	8	11	8	11	6	C	9	7	6	6	11	8	11	7	9	Ret	8	99
11	(United Kingdom) Jamie Ackers	11	9	7	12	11	7	10	8	13	C	6	Ret	11	10	8	11	Ret	9	14	7	10	72
12	(United Kingdom) David Nye	5	10					12	12	12	C	8	10	10	9	Ret			8	11	10	12	44
13	(United Kingdom) David Green	12	13	11	13	13	10	7	10	11	C	11	12	7	13	Ret	6	Ret	12	12	Ret	DNS	41
14	(United Kingdom) Dan Stringfellow	Ret	12	12	10	9	8			10	C	10	11	12									26
15	(United Kingdom) Steve Mitchell					12	12	Ret	DNS	14	C	Ret	Ret	Ret	12	Ret	12	10	11	13	11	13	11
Pos	Driver	BHI		ROC		DON		THR		CRO		SNE			OUL		KNO		SIL		BHI		Pts

**Bold** – Pole
Italics – Fastest Lap

Colour	Result
Gold	Winner
Silver	Second place
Bronze	Third place
Green	Points classification
Blue	Non-points classification
Blue	Non-classified finish (NC)
Purple	Retired, not classified (Ret)
Red	Did not qualify (DNQ)
Red	Did not pre-qualify (DNPQ)
Black	Disqualified (DSQ)
White	Did not start (DNS)
White	Withdrew (WD)
White	Race cancelled (C)
Blank	Did not practice (DNP)
Blank	Did not arrive (DNA)
Blank	Excluded (EX)
