= Nathan Freke =

English racing driver (born 1983)

Nathan Freke (born 8 September 1983) is a racing driver. He was the 2006 British Formula Ford Champion. Freke has held four British Kart Racing Championship Titles and in 2005 became the only driver ever to win an FIA/CIK Superkart Race in a Division 2 Kart against Division 1 Karts, (50% power differential).

== Biography ==
Freke was born in Hillingdon, England. He lives in Fenny Compton, England.

== 2006 ==
In 2006, Freke won the British Formula Ford Championship. On the way to the title, Freke won ten races, seventeen podiums, eighteen front row starts, thirteen poles and six lap records. Freke was one of the 2006 Mclaren – BRDC – Autosport Young Driver of the Year Finalists in his first full year of car racing.

== 2007 ==
Freke tested in a number of different formula cars such Champ Car Atlantic Series, Formula Three, and Formula BMW, but funding restricted his activities to chassis development for Van Diemen International and Marangoni Tyres. He also competed in the Porsche Carrera Cup and the Dutch Supercar Challenge.

== 2008 ==
Freke signed for Michael Crawford Motorsports to race in the Firestone Indy Lights Series in 2008, passing his rookie test at Nashville Superspeedway and had his first test on a fast oval at Homestead prior to the first race. He left the team after three races, with a best finish of eighth in the second race at St. Petersburg.

Freke competed in his first endurance race at the Nurburgring 24 hours on the full Nordschleife circuit, finishing 148th in the Marangoni Tyres backed Fiat 500 R after starting 220th.

== 2009 ==
Freke won the Ginetta G50 Cup supporting the British Touring Car Championship. Out of 28 races, Freke won fifteen of them to win the series by 125 points. Freke raced with his own Century Motorsport team, with support from EOS Productions and Hows My Driving. Freke is now looking for a Touring Car drive in 2010 as one of the most successful British racing drivers with a 42% win ratio in all national and international races.

== 2010 ==
Freke competed in the British GT G4 class with Century Motorsport and team mate Vibe Smed. Finishing third but missing the spa round.

== 2011 ==
Freke competed in the G55 class of the Ginetta GT Supercup with The Player Century Motorsport car, finishing fourth overall, winning six races, sixteen podiums, two pole positions and eight fastest laps.

== 2012 ==
Freke competed in the D3T class of the Nurburgring 24 Hour race winning class in a Jaguar XF-S. Freke also competed in three races in the Ginetta GT Supercup winning one and two more podiums in the Century Motorsport G55

== 2013 ==
Freke competed in two races in the Ginetta GT Supercup winning both with fastest lap in the Century Motorsport G55. Freke also competed in three British GT GT4 races winning one and two further podiums in the Century Motorsport G50. An outing in British GT GT3 with Stark Racing ended in a non finish.

== 2014 ==
Freke competed in two races in the Britcar Endurance Championship with Stark Racing winning one race and a podium in the other with fastest lap in both races.

== 2015 ==
Freke competed in GT Cup UK - GTA class finishing fourth overall with two wins, four podiums and five fastest laps. Freke also competed in one race in British GT GT4 class finishing on the podium.

== 2016 ==
Freke competed in the Dubai 24 hour race in SP3 class, winning on his first attempt. Freke competed in the Bolton University backed car run by Century Motorsport G55 in British GT GT4 class with one win, three podiums, one pole and one fastest lap.

== 2017 ==
Freke competed in his first International Historic race in a Healey 100/4 at the Spa 6 hour classic, winning class with pole position and fastest lap. Freke also competed in the Dubai 24 hour finishing second in the SP3 - GT4 class, he also raced in British GT GT3 class and GT4 class.

== Racing record ==
=== Complete British GT Championship results ===
(key) (Races in bold indicate pole position in class) (Races in italics indicate fastest lap in class)

| Year | Entrant | Chassis | Class | 1 | 2 | 3 | 4 | 5 | 6 | 7 | 8 | 9 | 10 | 11 | 12 | 13 | 14 | DC | Pts |
|---|---|---|---|---|---|---|---|---|---|---|---|---|---|---|---|---|---|---|---|
| 2009 | Century Motorsport | Ginetta G50 | GT4 | OUL; 1 | OUL; 2 | SPA; 1 | SPA; 2 | ROC; 1 | ROC; 2 | KNO; 1 | KNO; 2 | SNE; 1 | SNE; 2 | **DON**; **1**; 9 | SIL; 1 | BRH; 1 | BRH; 2 | 14th | 4 |
| 2010 | Century Motorsport | Ginetta G50 | GT4 | OUL; 1; 15 | OUL; 2 Ret | KNO; 1; 11 | **KNO**; **2**; 8 | SPA | ROC; 1; 12 | ROC; 2; 8 | SIL; 1 Ret | SNE; 1; 11 | SNE; 2; 13 | BRH; 1; 10 | **BRH**; **2** Ret | **DON**; **1**; 12 | | 3rd | 37 |
| 2013 | Stark Racing | Ginetta G55 GT3 | GT3 | OUL; 1 | OUL; 2 | ROC; 1 | SIL; 1 Ret | SNE; 1 | SNE; 2 | BRH; 1 | | | | | | | | NC | 0 |
| 2013 | Century Motorsport | Ginetta G50 | GT4 | | | | | | | | ZAN; 1; 24 | ZAN; 2 DSQ | DON; 1; 18 | | | | | 7th | 52.5 |
| 2015 | Century Motorsport | Ginetta G55 GT4 | GT4 | OUL; 1 | OUL; 2 | ROC; 1 | SIL; 1 | SPA; 1 | BRH; 1 | SNE; 1 | SNE; 2 | DON; 1; 18 | | | | | | NC† | 0† |
| 2016 | Century Motorsport | Ginetta G55 GT4 | GT4 | **BRH**; **1**; 11 | ROC; 1 DSQ | OUL; 1; 18 | OUL; 2 Ret | SIL; 1; 14 | SPA; 1; 22 | SNE; 1; 20 | SNE; 2; 21 | DON; 1; 13 | | | | | | 7th | 92 |
| 2017 | Century Motorsport | Ginetta G55 GT3 | GT3 | OUL; 1; 8 | OUL; 2; 22 | ROC; 1; 23 | | | | | | | DON; 1 Ret | | | | | 12th | 8 |
| 2017 | Century Motorsport | Ginetta G55 GT4 | GT4 | | | | SNE; 1; 19 | SNE; 2; 17 | SIL; 1 | SPA; 1 | SPA; 2 | BRH; 1 | | | | | | 23rd | 6 |
| 2019 | Century Motorsport | BMW M4 GT4 | GT4 | OUL; 1 | OUL; 2 | SNE; 1 | SNE; 2 | SIL; 1 | DON; 1 | SPA; 1 | BRH; 1; 16 | DON; 1 Ret | | | | | | 17th | 18 |

^{†} As Freke was a guest driver, he was ineligible for points.

=== American open–wheel racing results ===
(key) (Races in bold indicate pole position)

==== Indy Lights ====
| Year | Team | 1 | 2 | 3 | 4 | 5 | 6 | 7 | 8 | 9 | 10 | 11 | 12 | 13 | 14 | 15 | 16 | Rank | Points | Ref |
|---|---|---|---|---|---|---|---|---|---|---|---|---|---|---|---|---|---|---|---|---|
| 2008 | Michael Crawford Motorsports | HMS; 20 | STP1; 20 | STP2; 8 | KAN | INDY | MIL | IOW | WGL1 | WGL2 | NSH | MOH1 | MOH2 | KTY | SNM1 | SNM2 | CHI | **31st** | **44** | |

Sporting positions
| Preceded by Charlie Donnelly | British Formula Ford Championship; Champion; 2006 | Succeeded by Callum MacLeod |
| Preceded by Nigel Moore | Ginetta G50 Cup; Champion; 2009 | Succeeded by Frank Wrathall |
