= Frank Wrathall =

British racing driver (born 1986)

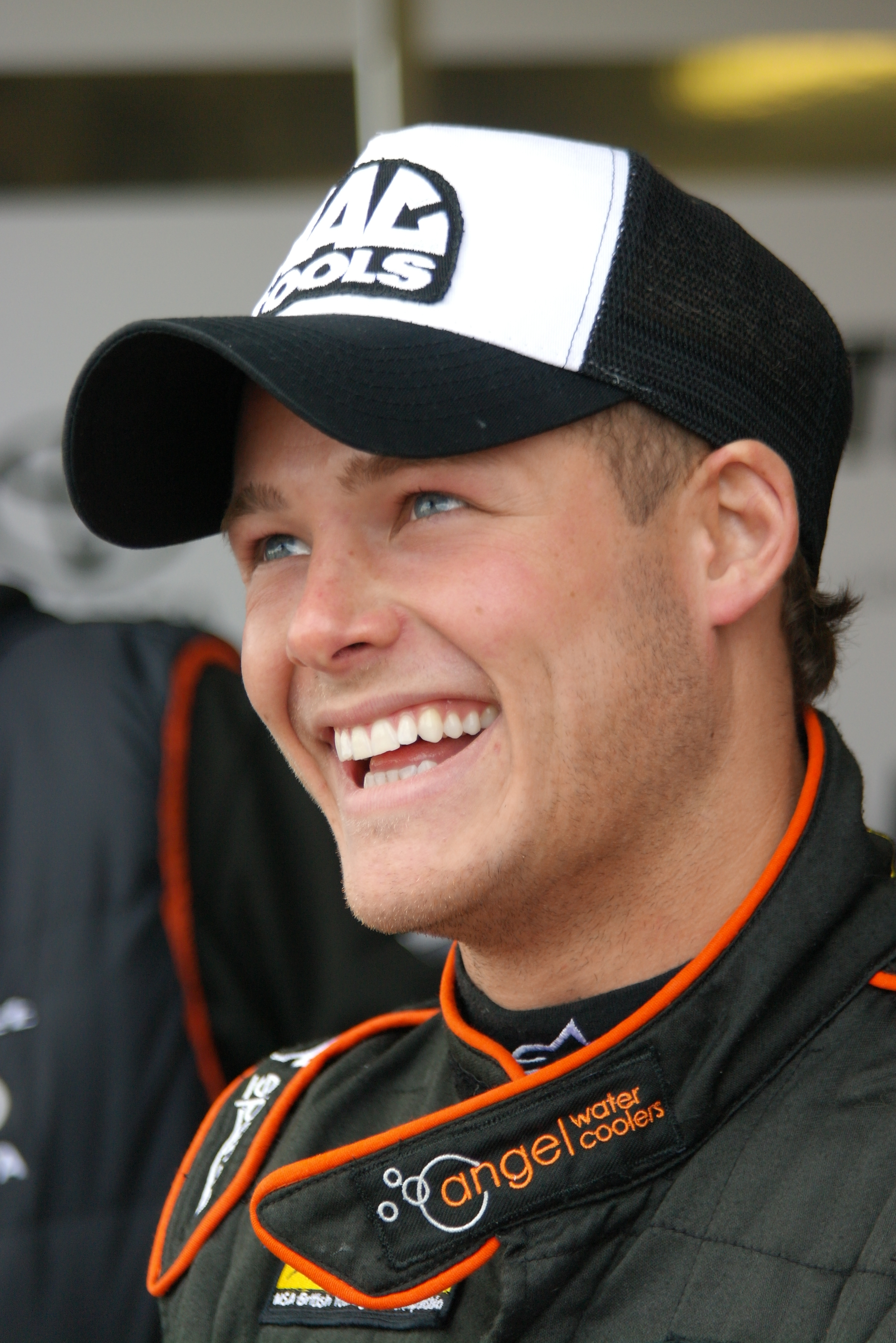
- Wrathall at the Donington round of the 2012 British Touring Car Championship season.
- Nationality: British
- Born: October 4, 1986 (age 40) Lancaster, England

Previous series
- 2011–13 2008–2010 2007 1998–2007: BTCC; Ginetta G50 Cup; Ginetta G20 Championship; Karting

Championship titles
- 2010: Ginetta G50 Cup

Awards
- 2010 2007 2006–2007: BRDC Rising Star; Ginetta Rookie of the Year; Will Hoy Scholarship Winner

Frank Brian Wrathall Jr. (born 4 October 1986 in Lancaster) is a British racing driver who has competed in the British Touring Car Championship. He won his first race on 21 October 2012 in the final race of the 2012 BTCC season.

Having graduated from karting in 2007, Wrathall made his car racing debut in the Ginetta G20 Championship. Having spent a single season in the series, he then switched to the Ginetta G50 Cup for 2008, going on to win the title in 2010. He joined the British Touring Car Championship in 2011, driving for the family-run Dynojet Racing Team.

Following a 21-month prison sentence for causing death by careless driving in 2014, Wrathall has not returned to the BTCC.

== Early life ==
Wrathall was born in Lancaster on 4 October 1986. He was educated at the Lancaster Royal Grammar School.

== Career ==
=== Ginetta Racing ===
In 2007, Wrathall swapped from karts to racing Ginetta cars. He took part in the 2007 Ginetta G20 Championship, debuting at Oulton Park and finishing the season in eighth place, with two podium results. This won him Ginetta Rookie of the Year. He graduated to the G50 Cup for the 2008 season, finishing second in 2008 and 2009 seasons. This spurred Wrathall on during the 2010 Ginetta G50 Cup season, leading to him eventually being crowned champion, after five race wins and 19 podium finishes.

=== British Touring Car Championship ===
Wrathall moved up to the BTCC in 2011, racing for Dynojet in a NGTC Toyota Avensis. At Knockhill, Wrathall became the first driver to reach the overall podium in an NGTC car, with two third-place finishes and a fourth from the three races. He took another third place in the opening race at Rockingham before improving on this to finish second in race two.

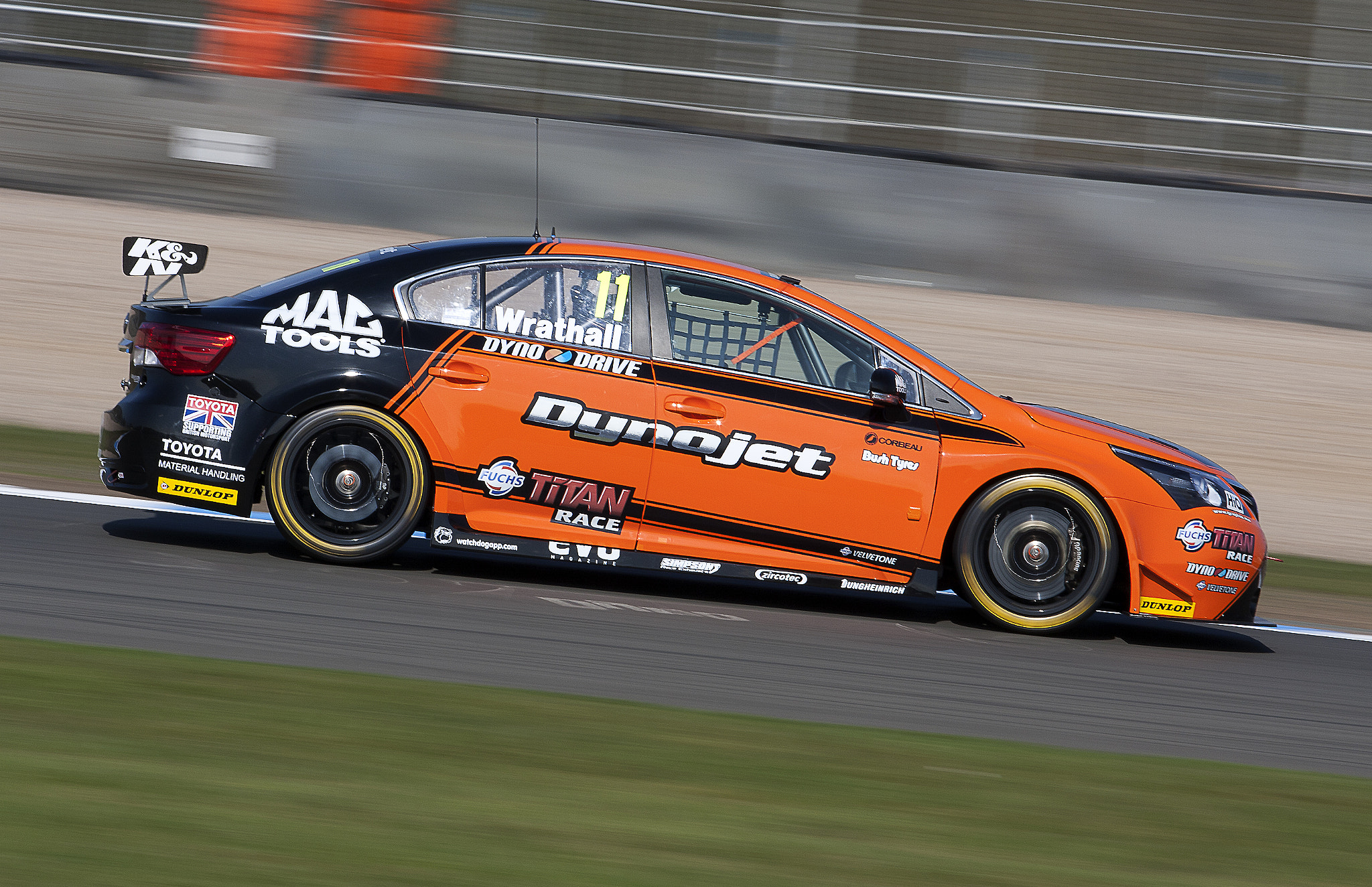
Wrathall driving the Dynojet Toyota Avensis at Donington Park during the 2013 British Touring Car Championship season.

Wrathall continued in the British Touring Car Championship in 2012, once again racing for Dynojet in the Toyota Avensis now sponsored by Mac Tools. He took his first podium of the season in round 9 at Thruxton, finishing ahead of Jason Plato to finish third. At the final round of the season at Brands Hatch, Wrathall took his first ever BTCC win in the final race, ahead of Matt Neal and newly crowned Champion Gordon Shedden.

== Dynojet Race Team ==
Dynojet Race Team, is a family run team, founded by Frank Wrathall Snr. He built the team up to help develop his son Frank's racing career. The team was regarded as one of the best teams in the Ginetta race series. The team is sponsored by Dynojet, who make parts for the automotive industry. In the 2010 Ginetta G50 Cup season, Dynojet won both the drivers and teams championships.

== Prosecution ==
On 14 May 2012, Wrathall was at the wheel of a van involved in a collision with a cyclist on a roundabout. The police laid information against him, alleging that he caused death by dangerous driving as he had been using a mobile phone for eight minutes prior to the collision, in which a 47-year-old cyclist was killed. Wrathall denied the charge. The first trial was judged a mistrial, and the judge ordered a media ban of the events. On 7 February 2014, he was jailed for 21 months after pleading guilty to the lesser charge of careless driving. He was also disqualified from driving for four years.

== Racing record ==
=== Complete British Touring Car Championship results ===
(key) (Races in bold indicate pole position – 1 point awarded just in first race) (Races in italics indicate fastest lap – 1 point awarded all races) (* signifies that driver lead race for at least one lap – 1 point given all races)

Year	Team	Car	1	2	3	4	5	6	7	8	9	10	11	12	13	14	15	16	17	18	19	20	21	22	23	24	25	26	27	28	29	30	Pos	Pts
2011	Dynojet	Toyota Avensis	BRH; 1 Ret	BRH; 2 DNS	BRH; 3 DNS	DON; 1; 16	DON; 2 NC	DON; 3 NC	THR; 1 Ret	THR; 2 DNS	THR; 3 Ret	OUL; 1 Ret	OUL; 2; 13	OUL; 3 Ret	CRO; 1; 12	CRO; 2 Ret	CRO; 3 Ret	SNE; 1; 4	SNE; 2 Ret	SNE; 3 DNS	KNO; 1; 4	KNO; 2; 3	KNO; 3; 3	ROC; 1; 3	ROC; 2; 2	ROC; 3; 9	BRH; 1 Ret	BRH; 2; 13	BRH; 3 Ret	SIL; 1; 10	SIL; 2; 25	SIL; 3; 9	12th	65
2012	Dynojet	Toyota Avensis	BRH; 1 Ret	BRH; 2 DNS	BRH; 3; 13	DON; 1; 9	DON; 2; 14	DON; 3; 7	THR; 1; 5	THR; 2; 4	THR; 3; 3	OUL; 1; 12	OUL; 2; 17	OUL; 3; 9	CRO; 1 Ret	CRO; 2; 8	CRO; 3; 15	**SNE**; **1**; 2	SNE; 2; 5	SNE; 3; 7	KNO; 1 Ret	KNO; 2 DNS	KNO; 3 DNS	ROC; 1; 11	ROC; 2; 5	ROC; 3; 12	SIL; 1 Ret	SIL; 2; 12	SIL; 3 Ret	BRH; 1 Ret	BRH; 2; 6	BRH; 3; 1*	10th	173
2013	Dynojet	Toyota Avensis	BRH; 1; 6	BRH; 2 Ret	BRH; 3; 8	DON; 1; 7	DON; 2 Ret	DON; 3 Ret	THR; 1; 15	THR; 2; 19	THR; 3 Ret	OUL; 1; 23	OUL; 2; 12	OUL; 3; 9	CRO; 1; 20	CRO; 2; 13	CRO; 3 Ret	SNE; 1 Ret	SNE; 2; 10	SNE; 3; 11	KNO; 1; 14	KNO; 2; 12	KNO; 3 Ret	ROC; 1; 10	ROC; 2; 13	ROC; 3 Ret	SIL; 1; 14	SIL; 2 Ret	SIL; 3 DNS	BRH; 1 Ret	BRH; 2; 10	BRH; 3; 21	16th	76

Sporting positions
Preceded by Nathan Freke	Ginetta G50 Cup; Champion; 2010	Succeeded by Tom Ingram
