= Tony Hughes (racing driver) =

British racing driver and businessman (born 1957)

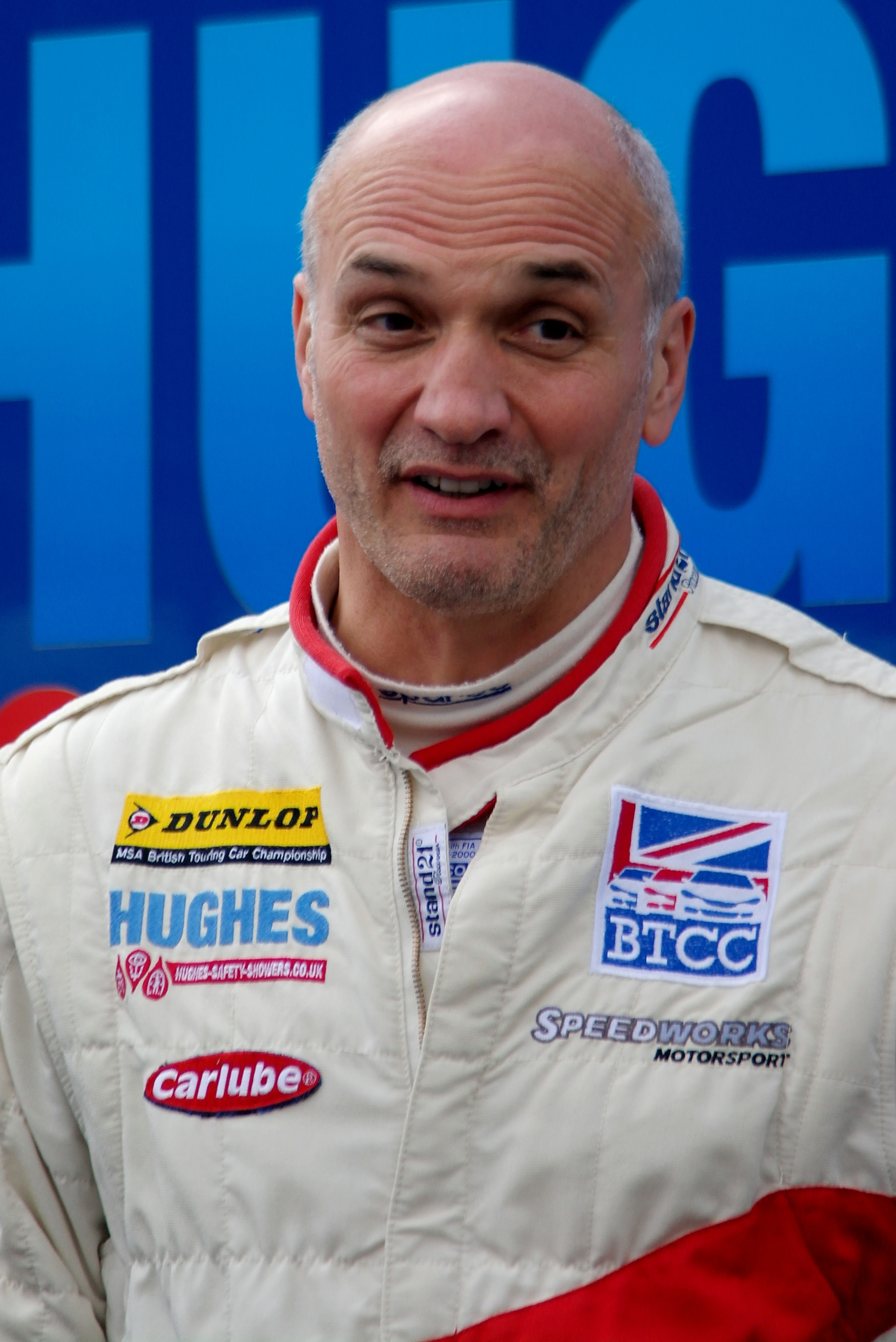
- Hughes as at the Donington Park round of the 2012 British Touring Car Championship season.
- Nationality: (United Kingdom) British
- Born: 31 December 1957 (age 68) Stockport, Cheshire, England

Previous series
- 2011–12 2008–10 2007: BTCC; Ginetta G50 Cup; Ginetta G20 Cup

Anthony Douglas Hughes (born 31 December 1957) is a British businessman and former racing driver. He was the managing director of Hughes Safety Showers until June 2016 and drove for Speedworks Motorsport in the British Touring Car Championship in 2011 and 2012.

== Racing career ==
=== Ginetta ===
Hughes started circuit racing in 2007, competing in the Ginetta G20 Cup for Speedworks Motorsport. The following year, he progressed to the Ginetta G50 Cup where he raced for three years. He won the Chairman's Cup once in 2009 and three times in 2010. During the round at Snetterton he was involved in a heavy collision with the spinning car of Formula One engineer Adrian Newey who was competing as a guest driver.

=== British Touring Car Championship ===
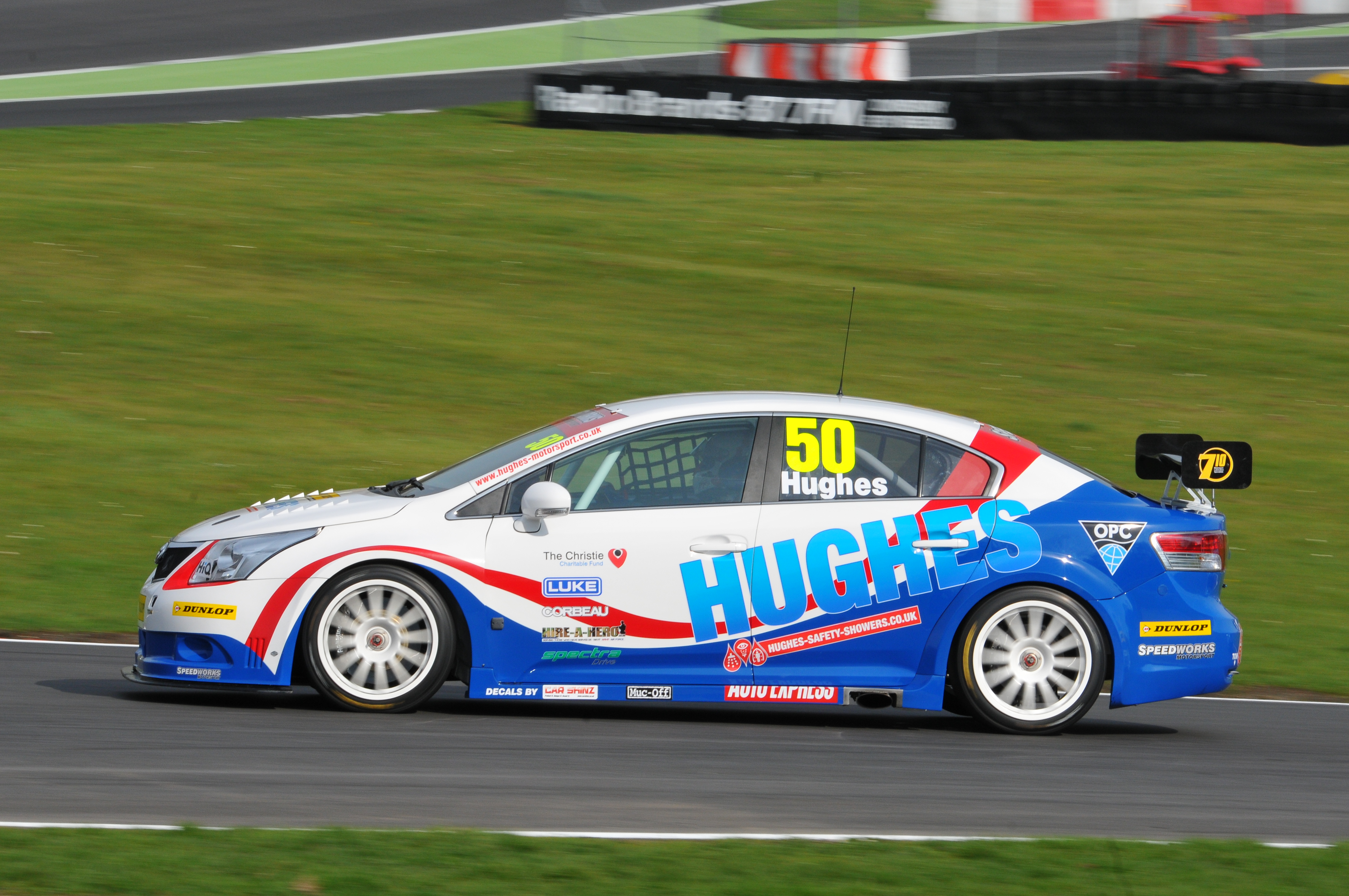
Hughes driving the Speedworks Motorsport Toyota Avensis at Brands Hatch during the 2011 British Touring Car Championship season.

For 2011, Hughes stepped up to the British Touring Car Championship, competing NGTC Toyota Avensis for Speedworks. He finished 31st in the overall drivers' championship with a best race result of 14th at Oulton Park.

Hughes confirmed he would return to Speedworks for the 2012 season driving alongside 2011 Ginetta GT Supercup champion Adam Morgan. He finished the season 25th in the drivers' standings with a best result of twelfth at Oulton Park. At the end of the season, he announced his retirement from motor racing although he would remain involved with the Speedworks team.

== Racing record ==
=== Complete British Touring Car Championship results ===
(key) (Races in bold indicate pole position – 1 point awarded just in first race) (Races in italics indicate fastest lap – 1 point awarded all races) (* signifies that driver lead race for at least one lap – 1 point given all races)

Year	Team	Car	1	2	3	4	5	6	7	8	9	10	11	12	13	14	15	16	17	18	19	20	21	22	23	24	25	26	27	28	29	30	Pos	Pts
2011	Speedworks Motorsport	Toyota Avensis	BRH; 1 Ret	BRH; 2; 19	BRH; 3; 21	DON; 1; 19	DON; 2; 16	DON; 3 Ret	THR; 1	THR; 2	THR; 3	OUL; 1; 16	OUL; 2; 14	OUL; 3; 17	CRO; 1	CRO; 2	CRO; 3	SNE; 1; 21	SNE; 2 Ret	SNE; 3 DNS	KNO; 1	KNO; 2	KNO; 3	ROC; 1	ROC; 2	ROC; 3	BRH; 1; 21	BRH; 2; 26	BRH; 3; 21	SIL; 1; 19	SIL; 2; 21	SIL; 3 Ret	31st	0
2012	Speedworks Motorsport	Toyota Avensis	BRH; 1; 16	BRH; 2; 16	BRH; 3; 15	DON; 1 Ret	DON; 2; 16	DON; 3; 15	THR; 1 NC	THR; 2; 19	THR; 3; 16	OUL; 1; 13	OUL; 2; 12	OUL; 3; 14	CRO; 1	CRO; 2	CRO; 3	SNE; 1; 16	SNE; 2; 16	SNE; 3; 16	KNO; 1	KNO; 2	KNO; 3	ROC; 1; 15	ROC; 2; 17	ROC; 3; 17	SIL; 1; 15	SIL; 2; 17	SIL; 3; 17	BRH; 1; 20	BRH; 2; 17	BRH; 3; 15	25th	14
