= Matt Allison =

British racing driver (born 1983)

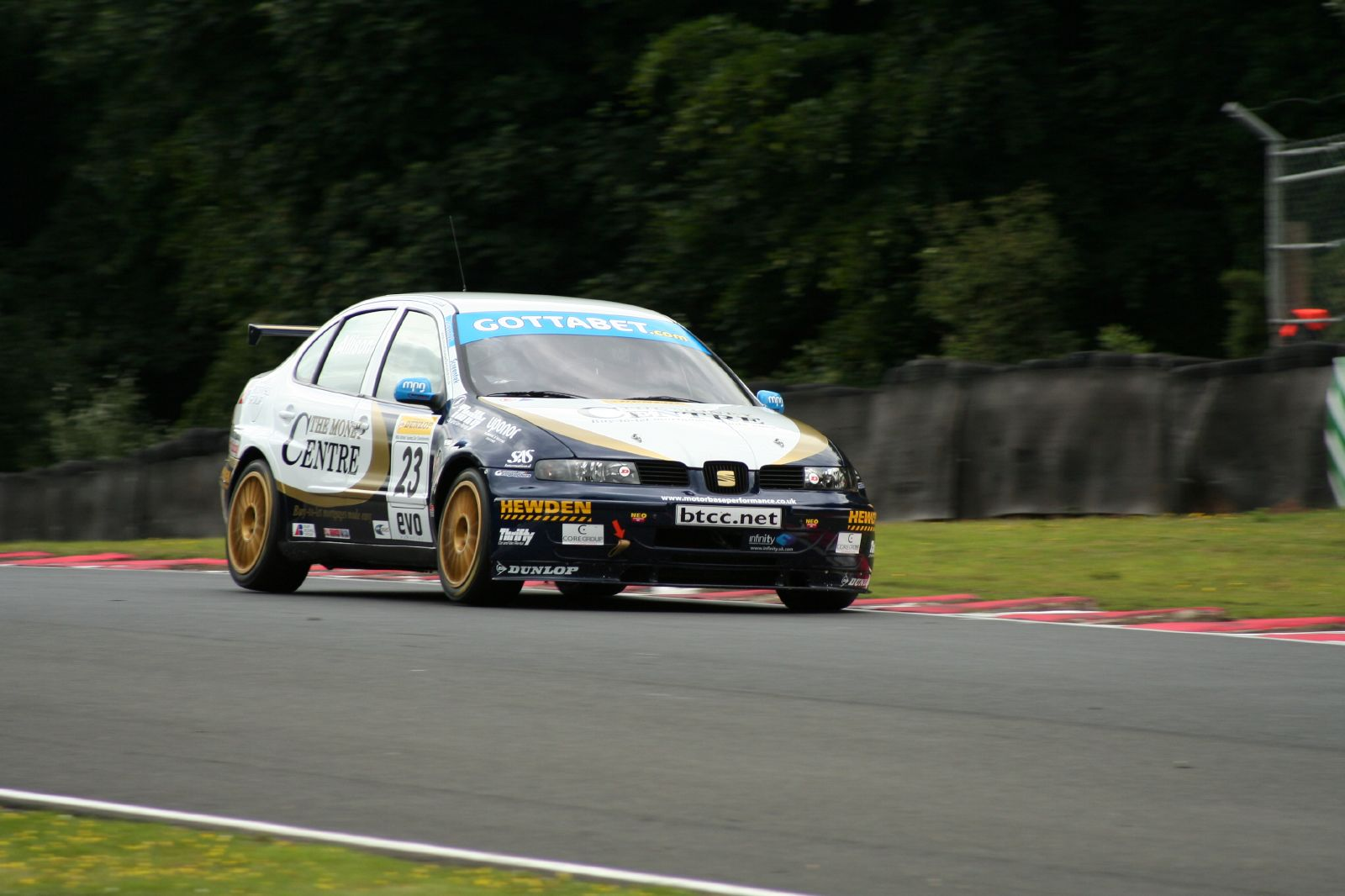
- Nationality: British

Previous series
- 2007-2008: British Touring Car Championship

Matt Allison (born 13 June 1983 in Norwich) is a British racing driver. He is most well known for winning the 2006 British GT Championship and for racing in the British Touring Car Championship (BTCC). He progressed through the ranks of British Karting, winning two championships and two runner-up trophies before moving to Formula Ford in the 2000.

In his first year of car racing, Allison won the BRDC Formula Ford 1600 single seater championship. He progressed to the senior Ford 1800 category for 2001–2003 with numerous podium finishes and a championship best finish of fifth in 2002. Funding issues preventing a move to Formula Renault/F3 saw him switch to front wheel drive saloon racing in the form of the Renault Clio Cup. A third place in only his third ever saloon car race meant that Allison was again at the front of a respected British championship and pushing for the title. Finishing third overall with an impressive 12 podiums, he went on to win the highly prestigious Renault Clio Winter Cup Series in 2005.

In 2006, Allison saw his career take a big step forwards when he was given the opportunity to enter the world of sportscar racing in the British GT Championship. He drove his Porsches 911 GT3 to four wins, nine podiums and six pole positions to clinch his third British Championship in six years. Racing across Europe, Allison won the highly prestigious Pau Grand Prix Street Race in France in July 2006 beating over 60 entries from across Europe.

In late 2006, Allison participated in the last rounds of the FIA GT3 European Championship at Mugello in Italy, racing an Ascari KZ1. In torrential conditions he proved his talent in a car he barely knew by finishing second in both the two-hour races, Ascari's best results of the season.

In 2007, Allison entered the British Touring Car Championship racing for Motorbase Performance in their SEAT Toledo Cupras. He finished a very credible 6th in the Independents Trophy and 12th overall. His performance over the season won him widespread recognition as a touring car driver and he was rated in the top-ten of the BTCC 2007 Season by Autosport in his first season.

In early 2008, Allison signed to drive a Chevrolet Lacetti for Robertshaw Racing in the 2008 British Touring Car Championship season. With little opportunity to test the car before the Media Day at Rockingham Motor Speedway, he finished seventh for the day on his first drive in the car justifying his high expectations for the season. He put in some good performances in the first nine rounds of the series, picking up some good points, but the car was weighted down by the organisers, making it uncompetitive and Allison had to pull out after the Donington Park rounds due to financial problems. Despite this, Allison was still 17th in the championship.

Unable to secure a satisfactory full-time seat for 2009, Allison decided to take some time out to concentrate on his family business, for which he is the majority shareholder, and analyse opportunities from there.

It was not until 2011 that Allison made his racing return, in the highly competitive Renault Clio Cup. After three seasons away he showed no signs of slowing down, finishing 4th on his debut, and went on to score two popular wins at Croft.

Allison became a father in 2012. Additionally, he was accepted as a full member of the British Racing Drivers Club.

== Personal life ==
As well as being a keen golfer, Allison is a Director of numerous companies in his home town of Norwich. He is also an experienced race instructor having worked at many of England's racing schools, and has undertaken corporate work for, amongst others, Mazda, Renault and Volvo.

In more recent years, Allison has been the Driver Performance Coach for R Racing Ltd in the Ginetta Junior Championship which supports the BTCC & British GT Championship. In 2022, 2023 & 2024, he coached the overall drivers champion, Josh Rowledge, Freddie Slater & Ethan Jeff-Hall respectively.

== Racing record ==
2014 - Selected races in Michelin Clio Cup Series. Pole position at first round at Thruxton after 3yrs sabbatical. Numerous podiums including double win at Croft.

2012 - Accepted as Full Member to the BRDC - British Racing Drivers Club

2011 – Part season in Elf Renault Clio Cup – 2 pole positions & 2 wins (Croft) + x6 top

           6 finishes with new team, leading the team on setup & best practise. 

2010 – 1 Year sabbatical to concentrate on family business. Selected GT testing &

           Development driving. VdeV Championship Ligier – x2 2nd places & fastest lap. 

2009 – Selected races Elf Renault Clio Cup – 2nd place and new lap record, Snetterton.

           Selected Ginetta G50 Supercup – Front row start on first outing. X4 top 6 finishes.  

2008 - Hi-Q MSA British Touring Car championship, Chevrolet Lacetti entered by RML engineering customer team Robertshaw Racing. Best result 5th.

2007 – Dunlop MSA British Touring Car Championship, Seat Toledo Cupra, 6th BTCC Independents Championship (top rookie), Rated in Autosport’s BTCC top ten drivers.

2006 - Avon Tyres British GTC Champion ( Porsche 911 GT3) with 4 wins and 9 podiums. 2006 - Winner ‘Grand Prix De Pau’ Porsche GT3

      2006 – Selected rounds of the FIA GT3 Championship in an Ascari KZ1R V8, 2 X second places.

2005 - ELF Renault Clio Cup Winter Series Champion (£10,000 prize fund)

2005 - Full season ELF Renault Clio Cup with Boulevard Team Racing. Finished 3rd in British Championship with 12 Podiums, 1 Win, 2 Pole Positions & 2 Fastest Laps. Clio Lap Records at Oulton Park and Donington Park.

2004 - Full season of ELF Renault Clio Cup - Finished 6th in British Championship with Five podiums and Two pole positions.

2003 - Last four races in ELF Renault Clio Cup, podium finish in third ever Saloon Car race.

2003 - Slick 50 Formula Ford - Lying 6th in Championship with three rounds to go but forced to pull out due to lack of funds.

2001/2002 Avon Jnr Formula Ford Championship, 5th in UK Championship

2000 - 1600 BRDC Formula Ford Champion with Six Wins

1999 - Runner Up TV Kart Masters.

1995-1998 - All Norfolk and Suffolk Junior & Senior Kart Champion. Kimbolton club champ.

=== Complete British Touring Car Championship results ===
(key) (Races in bold indicate pole position – 1 point awarded in first race) (Races in italics indicate fastest lap- 1 point awarded all races) (* signifies that driver lead race for at least one lap – 1 point awarded all races)

Year	Team	Car	1	2	3	4	5	6	7	8	9	10	11	12	13	14	15	16	17	18	19	20	21	22	23	24	25	26	27	28	29	30	DC	Pts
2007	Motorbase Performance	SEAT Toledo Cupra	BRH; 1; 12	BRH; 2; 9	BRH; 3; 10	ROC; 1; 11	ROC; 2; 7	ROC; 3; 9	THR; 1; 7	THR; 2 Ret	THR; 3; 11	CRO; 1 Ret	CRO; 2 Ret	CRO; 3 Ret	OUL; 1 Ret	OUL; 2; 10	OUL; 3; 8	DON; 1; 6	DON; 2; 8	DON; 3; 10	SNE; 1; 12	SNE; 2; 10	SNE; 3 Ret	BRH; 1; 9	BRH; 2 Ret	BRH; 3; 12	KNO; 1	KNO; 2	KNO; 3	THR; 1 Ret	THR; 2 Ret	THR; 3 Ret	12th	29
2008	Robertshaw Racing	Chevrolet Lacetti	BRH; 1; 11	BRH; 2; 12	BRH; 3; 8	ROC; 1; 12	ROC; 2 Ret	ROC; 3 DNS	DON; 1 Ret	DON; 2 DNS	DON; 3 DNS	THR; 1	THR; 2	THR; 3	CRO; 1	CRO; 2	CRO; 3	SNE; 1	SNE; 2	SNE; 3	OUL; 1	OUL; 2	OUL; 3	KNO; 1	KNO; 2	KNO; 3	SIL; 1	SIL; 2	SIL; 3	BRH; 1	BRH; 2	BRH; 3	17th	3
