= 1999 Spa 24 Hours =

1999 Proximus Spa 24 Hours

Seasons
- ← 1998 2000 →

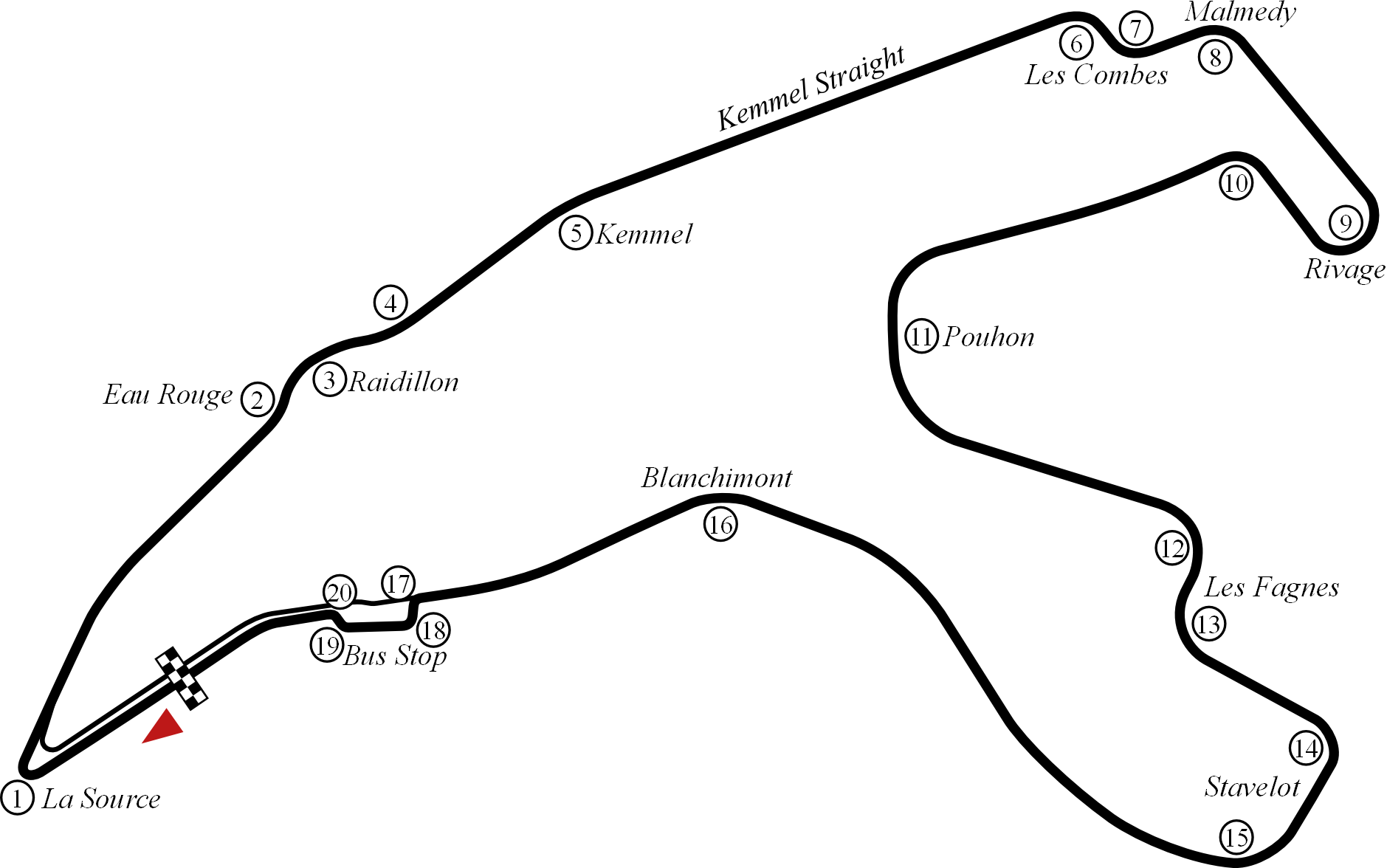
Layout of the Circuit de Spa-Francorchamps (1995-2003)

The 1999 Proximus 24 Spa World Championship GT was the 53rd running of the Spa 24 Hours. It took place at the Circuit de Spa-Francorchamps, Belgium, between 3 and 4 August 1999. The event was won by the #1 Peugeot Team Belgique Luxembourg Peugeot 306 GTi.

2 classes ran in the event. Group 1 - Superproduction fuel (SP) and Group 2 - Group N 2000 (N2.0). 53 cars started with 27 being classified.

== Race results ==
Class winners in bold.

Pos	Class	No	Team	Drivers	Car	Laps
1	**SP**	**27**	(Belgium) **Team Peugeot Belgique Luxembourg**	(Belgium) **Frédéric Bouvy** (France) **Anthony Beltoise** (France) **Emmanuel Collard**	**Peugeot 306**	**492**
2	SP	7	(Belgium) Team Peugeot Belgique Luxembourg	(Belgium) Thierry Tassin (Belgium) Thierry van Dalen (Belgium) Kurt Mollekens	Peugeot 306	491
3	SP	20	(Belgium) Team Peugeot Belgique Luxembourg	(Belgium) Bas Leinders (Belgium) Pascal Witmeur (Belgium) Jeffrey van Hooydonk	Peugeot 306	488
4	SP	24	Nissan Belgium	(Belgium) Dirk Schoysman (Belgium) Guino Kenis (Belgium) Grégoire de Mévius	Nissan Primera	484
5	SP	6	Team Renault Sport Belgium	(Belgium) Mathias Viaene (Belgium) Martial Chouvel (Belgium) Vanina Ickx	Renault Mégane	479
6	SP	14	(Italy) CiBiEmme Engineering srl	(Italy) Gianmarino Zenere (Italy) Beppe Gabbiani (Germany) Andy Bovensiepen	BMW 320i E46	470
7	SP	15	(Belgium) E.B.R.T	(Belgium) Etienne Baugnée (Belgium) Sylvie Delcour (Belgium) Damien Chaballe	BMW 320i E36	462
8	SP	31	(Italy) Racing Box srl	(Italy) Marco Brand (Italy) Gabriele Mateuzzi (Italy) Luca Canni-Ferrari	Honda Integra Type-R	457
9	SP	56	(Belgium) Ecurie Bruxelloise	(Belgium) Alain di Duca (Belgium) Damien Coens (Germany) Wolfgang Haugg	Honda Integra Type-R	455
10	SP	17	(France) Ecurie Azur	(Belgium) Christophe d'Ansembourg (France) Ferdinand de Lesseps (United States) Jay Cochran	BMW 320i E36	454
11	SP	33	(United Kingdom) LR Organisation	(Belgium) Stanislas De Sadeleer (Germany) Nicolaus Springler (United Kingdom) Peter Hardman	Honda Integra Type-R	453
12	SP	30	(United Kingdom) Foss-Tech Racing	(United Kingdom) Tim Sugden (United Kingdom) Mark Lemmer (United Kingdom) Stephen Day	Honda Integra Type-R	452
13	**N2.0**	**35**	(Belgium) **E.B.R.T.**	(Belgium) **Jean-Pierre Blaise** (Belgium) **Eric Gressens** (Belgium) **Christophe Kerkhove**	**Honda Integra Type-R**	**447**
14	SP	26	(Belgium) Ecurie Bruxelloise	(Belgium) Jean-Michel Delporte (Belgium) Pierre-Olivier Businaro (Belgium) Michel Schmitz	Peugeot 306	445
15	SP	21	(Belgium) Belgacom Team	(Belgium) Arnaud van Schevensteen (Italy) Gabriele Cadringher (Belgium) Koen Wauters	BMW 320i	444
16	N2.0	54	(Belgium) Racing Car Mosan	(Belgium) Michel Wilders (Belgium) Vincent Grignard (Belgium) Jean-Louis Raxhon	Honda Integra Type-R	442
17	SP	60	(Belgium) Team Peugeot Belgique Luxembourg	(Belgium) Olivier Bruixola (Belgium) Luigi Vroman (Belgium) Eric Groes	Peugeot 106	438
18	SP	66	(France) Ecurie Azur	(Belgium) Thierry de Bonhome (Italy) Giovanni Bruno (Belgium) Pascal Vandeput	Honda Civic V-Tec	433
19	SP	76	(United Kingdom) LR Organisation	(Belgium) Bruno Thiry (Belgium) Bernard Carlier (United Kingdom) Simon Wiseman	Honda Integra Type-R	426
20	N2.0	61	(Belgium) E.B.R.T.	(Belgium) Jacky Delvaux (Belgium) Lionel Jaminet (Belgium) Bernard Crouquet	Renault Clio I Williams	419
21	SP	99	(Belgium) Ecurie Bruxelloise	(Belgium) Jose Close (Belgium) Philippe Roggemans (Belgium) Alain Goffin	Toyota Celica GT	415
22	SP	79	(Belgium) Gurzo	(Belgium) Peter Gurzo (Belgium) Alain Corbisier (Belgium) Olivier Prignon	Honda Civic	412
23	N2.0	57	(United Kingdom) Morss	(United Kingdom) Peter Morss (Belgium) Paul Michael (United Kingdom) Del Delaronde	Honda Integra Type-R	405
24	SP	25	(France) GZ Team	(France) Christophe Giltaire (France) Sébastien Giltaire (France) Michel Carle	Peugeot 306	398
25	N2.0	64	(France) Ecurie Le Perron	(Belgium) Alain Derette (Belgium) Marc Theunissen (France) Rodolphe Dupuy	SEAT Ibiza Cupra	382
26	N2.0	65	(Belgium) E.B.R.T.	(Belgium) Robert Matot (Belgium) Pierre Chaudoir (France) Patrick Brayard	Renault Clio I Williams	365
27	SP	51	(Belgium) Gentse Autosport	(Belgium) Jo Lambrecht (Belgium) Amaury Heurckmans (Belgium) Philippe Eliard	Opel Vectra GT	361
NC	N2.0	62	(Belgium) E.B.R.T.	(Belgium) René Marin (Belgium) Michel Lambermont (Belgium) Didier Flohimont	Renault Clio I Williams	342
DNF	SP	23	Nissan Belgium	(France) Alain Cudini (Belgium) Didier Defourny (Sweden) Anders Olofsson	Nissan Primera	402
DNF	SP	10	(Belgium) PSI Motorsport	(Belgium) Stéphane De Groodt (Belgium) Frédéric Moreau (Belgium) Kurt Heckters	Honda Integra Type-R	395
DNF	N2.0	52	(Italy) Racing Box srl	(Italy) Franco Calzolari (Italy) Fabrizio Moré (Italy) Emilio Melloni	Honda Integra Type-R	395
DNF	SP	37	(Belgium) Ecurie Bruxelloise	(Belgium) Xavier de Saeger (Belgium) Didier de Saeger (Belgium) Stéphane Mertens	Suzuki Baleno	279
DNF	N2.0	53	(United Kingdom) Speedworks	(United Kingdom) Ian Khan (Japan) Masahiro Kimoto (Japan) Akira Yoshimoto	Honda Integra Type-R	273
DNF	SP	55	(United Kingdom) Synchro Motorsport	(United Kingdom) Kevin Hicks (United Kingdom) Dave Allan (United Kingdom) Bill Stillwell	Honda Civic	213
DNF	SP	8	(Netherlands) H&P Race and Incentive	(Netherlands) Peter van der Kolk (Netherlands) Harry Stoeltie (Netherlands) Gerry Deelstra	BMW 320i E36	175
DNF	SP	32	Team Renault Sport Belgium	(Belgium) Benoit Galand (Belgium) Philippe de Leener (Belgium) Pierre van Vliet	Renault Megane	170
DNF	SP	5	(United Kingdom) Foss-Tech Engineering	(United Kingdom) Will Hoy (United Kingdom) Jeff Allam (United Kingdom) Simon Graves	Honda Integra Type-R	133
DNF	SP	77	(Belgium) Belgian VW Club	(Belgium) Bernard Winderickx (Belgium) Robert Dierick (Belgium) Michel Heydens	Volkswagen Golf GTI IV	131
DNF	SP	28	(Belgium) Paduwa Racing	(Belgium) Cédric Lorent (Belgium) Anthony Delon (Belgium) Marc Blaton	Alfa Romeo 156	106
DNF	SP	9	Team Renault Sport Belgium	(Belgium) Stéphane Lémeret (Belgium) Peter Baert (Belgium) Stéphane Tollenaire	Renault Megane	97
DNF	SP	36	(Belgium) Renstal U.R.R.T.	(Belgium) Georges Colman (Belgium) Ronny de Lannoy (Belgium) Eric de Bakker	Volkswagen Golf Mk4	90
DNF	SP	4	(Belgium) ELR	(Belgium) Philippe Tollenaire (United Kingdom) James Kaye (Switzerland) Philippe Favre	Honda Accord	89
DNF	SP	29	(Belgium) Ecurie Baudoin Visétoise	(Belgium) Guy Katsers (Belgium) François Turco (Belgium) Eric Neve	Alfa Romeo 156	74
DNF	N2.0	59	(Belgium) Ecurie Bruxelloise	(Belgium) Eric Schwilden (Belgium) Pascal Goffard (Belgium) Jacques Morlet	Peugeot 205	72
DNF	SP	1	(Belgium) BMW Fina	(Belgium) Didier de Radiguès (Belgium) Marc Duez (Belgium) Vincent Vosse	BMW 320i E46	51
DNF	SP	16	(Belgium) Ecurie Toison d'Or	(Belgium) Jean-Michel Martin (Belgium) Nicolas Kropp (Netherlands) Patrick Huisman	BMW 320i E46	46
DNF	SP	18	(France) Ecurie de Perron	(Belgium) Jean-Pierre Van de Wauwer (France) Eric van de Vyver (Belgium) Marc Schoonbroodt	BMW 320i E36	43
DNF	SP	3	Team Renault Sport Belgium	(Belgium) Pierre-Yves Corthals (France) Franck Lagorce (France) Alain Ferté	Renault Mégane	40
DNF	N2.0	63	(France) Ecurie de Villeneuve	(France) Philippe Bianchi (France) Pierre-Henri Schnell (France) Jean-Luc Blanchemain	Citroën Xsara	39
DNF	SP	2	(Belgium) BMW Fina	(Belgium) David Saelens (Czech Republic) Tomáš Enge (United Kingdom) Jenson Button	BMW 320i E46	22
DNF	SP	12	(Belgium) L.O. Racing	(Belgium) François-Xavier Boucher (France) Sylvain Noël (Belgium) Stefan van Campenhoudt	Alfa Romeo 156	22
DNF	SP	11	(Belgium) L.O. Racing	(Belgium) Sébastien Ugeux (Belgium) Pierre-Alain Thibault (Belgium) Geoffroy Horion	Alfa Romeo 156	2
DNF	SP	34	(Netherlands) BRP Competition	(Netherlands) Bert Ploeg (Netherlands) Pim van Riet (Netherlands) Frans Verschuur	Volkswagen Golf Mk3	2
