= Dave Allan (racing driver) =

British racing driver (1965–2012)

- Nationality: (United Kingdom) British
- Born: 1 April 1965
- Died: 3 July 2012 (aged 47) Millbrook, Bedfordshire, England

British Touring Car Championship
- Years active: 2001–2002
- Teams: Synchro Motorsport
- Starts: 35
- Wins: 0
- Poles: 0
- Fastest laps: 0
- Best finish: 9th (Production Class) in 2002

David Mark Allan (1 April 1965 – 3 July 2012) was a British racing driver and Honda test driver. He started his racing career in the National Saloon Car Championship with Synchro Motorsport which he was a key member of, driving a Honda Civic finishing 14th with 16 points. He drove in the series for another two years finishing tenth in 1999 and 14th in 2000 along with entering one race of the Belgian Procar in both years.

For 2001, Allan made the switch to the British Touring Car Championship driving a Honda Accord in the Production Class eventually finishing 12th in the championship, missing three rounds with Mark Lemmer driving in two. He made a late entry in 2002 racing alongside eventual Production champion James Kaye driving a Honda Civic Type-R. He was outraced by Kaye for most of the season finishing ninth in the championship.

In 2011, Allan drove in the Dunlop Production GTN Championship driving a Honda Jazz.

At about 11:30 on Tuesday 3 July, Allan was killed when the car he was testing at Millbrook Proving Ground lost control and rolled several times.

== Racing record ==
=== Complete British Touring Car Championship results ===
(key) Races in bold indicate pole position in class (1 point awarded all races) Races in italics indicate fastest lap in class (1 point awarded all races) * signifies that driver lead race for at least one lap in class (1 point awarded just in feature race)

Year	Team	Car	Class	1	2	3	4	5	6	7	8	9	10	11	12	13	14	15	16	17	18	19	20	21	22	23	24	25	26	DC	Pts	Class
2001	Synchro Motorsport	Honda Accord	P	BRH; 1; 10†	BRH; 2 ovr:19 cls:13	THR; 1 ovr:8 cls:4	THR; 2 ovr:15 cls:10	OUL; 1 ovr:21 cls:13	OUL; 2 ovr:11 cls:7	SIL; 1 ovr:16 cls:9	SIL; 2 ovr:14 cls:7	MON; 1	MON; 2	DON; 1 ovr:15 cls:8	DON; 2 ovr:9 cls:4	KNO; 1 Ret	KNO; 2 DNS	SNE; 1	SNE; 2	CRO; 1	CRO; 2	OUL; 1 ovr:18 cls:10	OUL; 2 ovr:14 cls:8	SIL; 1 ovr:17 cls:8	SIL; 2 ovr:14 cls:6	DON; 1 ovr:19 cls:11	DON; 2 Ret	BRH; 1 ovr:18 cls:10	BRH; 2 ovr:13 cls:9	N/A	49	12th
2002	Synchro Motorsport	Honda Civic Type-R	P	BRH; 1	BRH; 2	OUL; 1	OUL; 2	THR; 1 Ret	THR; 2 ovr:18 cls:7	SIL; 1 ovr:26 cls:14	SIL; 2 ovr:19 cls:5	MON; 1 ovr:16 cls:6	MON; 2 ovr:16 cls:5	CRO; 1 ovr:15 cls:5	CRO; 2 Ret	SNE; 1 ovr:18 cls:4	SNE; 2 ovr:15 cls:5	KNO; 1 ovr:17 cls:5	KNO; 2 ovr:19 cls:6	BRH; 1 Ret	BRH; 2 ovr:19 cls:7	DON; 1 Ret	DON; 2 ovr:17 cls:8							N/A	61	9th

† Event with 2 races staged for the different classes.

=== Britcar 24 Hour results ===
Year	Team	Co-Drivers	Car	Car No.	Class	Laps	Pos.	Class Pos.
2007	(United Kingdom) ELR	(United States) Mark Hein (United Kingdom) Peter Venn	Honda Civic Type R	62	2	564	12th	**2nd**
