= 2001 British Touring Car Championship =

44th season of the British Touring Car Championship

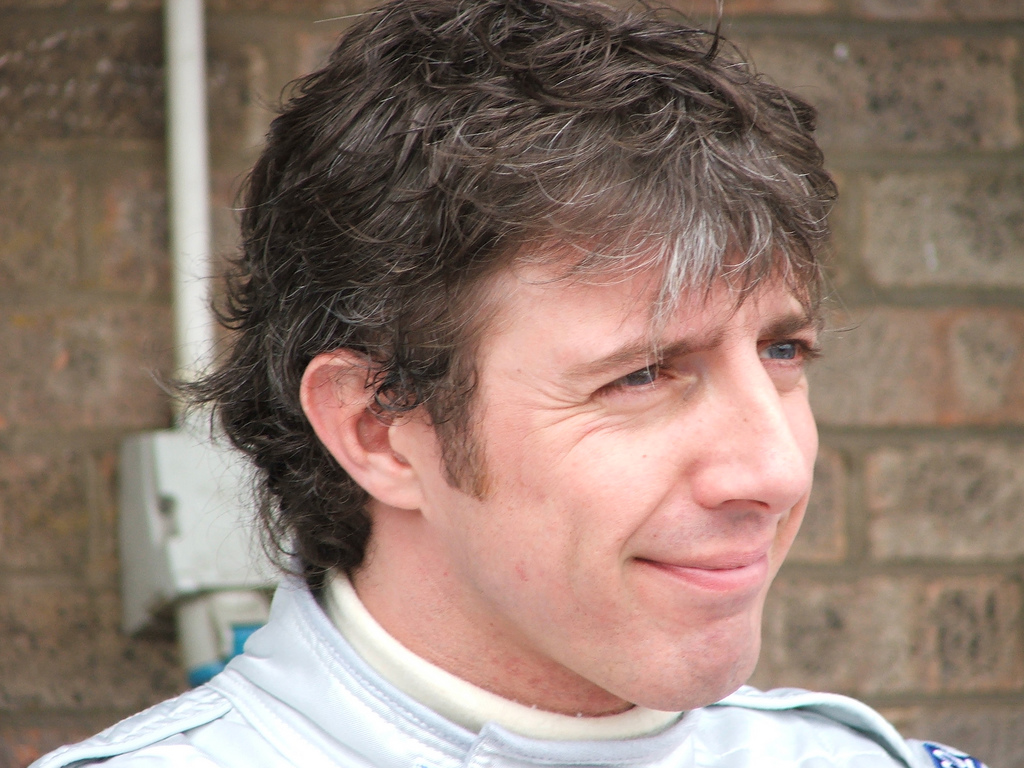
Jason Plato, the 2001 British Touring Car Champion.

The 2001 theAA.com MSA British Touring Car Championship season was the 44th British Touring Car Championship (BTCC) season and marked the beginning of a new era of lower-cost rules and regulations for the series. The season saw a rivalry between Vauxhall teammates Jason Plato and Yvan Muller for the title.

== Changes for 2001 ==
2001 saw a complete overhaul of the BTCC, aimed at reducing the cost of competition, improving the quality of racing and making the series more appealing to the fans. The running of the championship was taken over by British Motorsport Promoters (BMP), replacing TOCA who had run the series since 1992.

=== New regulations ===
The escalating costs of Supertouring in the late 1990s had seen manufacturers withdrawing as they were no longer able to justify spending the vast amounts of money required to stay competitive and in the British championship in particular independent entries had dropped to an all-time low. In 1999 TOCA had begun looking at the next generation of touring car with changes that included simplified aerodynamics, less expensive carbon fibre and more common parts. In June 2000 BMP unveiled plans for the new look formula designed to be "both spectacular and cost effective..." this included allowing manufacturers to use 2 or 3 door cars, no complicated aerodynamics, and standardized parts such as brakes, wheels, gearbox and differential. It also initially stipulated that only front wheel drive cars would be eligible, however this was later changed to allow rear wheel drive cars.

2001 saw the field divided into two classes: BTC-T (Touring class for the new specification cars) and BTC-P (Production for super production based cars, known previously as Class B).

The race format for 2001 was slightly tweaked, there would be three races per weekend - two separate sprint races, one for the BTC-T class and one for the BTC-P class followed by a combined feature race where the BTC-T class would be required to make a 2 tyre stop between 15 and 75% distance as with the previous three seasons. The BTC-P class cars would not be required to stop. In part this format was introduced to allow the BTC-P teams to score and overall victory/podium and not be in the shadow of the BTC-T class. This format was implemented at the opening round however due to the low grid numbers in the BTC-T class (only eight cars completed qualifying) the sprint race was also combined for the remainder of the season. In order for BTC-P teams to still challenge for an overall victory they would have to complete one less lap, BTC-T teams would start first then after a time delay that varied depending on track length the BTC-P teams got the green light. The BTC-T teams would have to catch and effectively un-lap themselves which created a tortoise and hare style race. Across the season the sprint victories were evenly mixed with seven 'outright' victories for the BTC-P class.

However both classes had their own points system so this made no difference in terms of the championship and it was seen as unnecessarily confusing to the casual fan and was ultimately dropped for 2002.

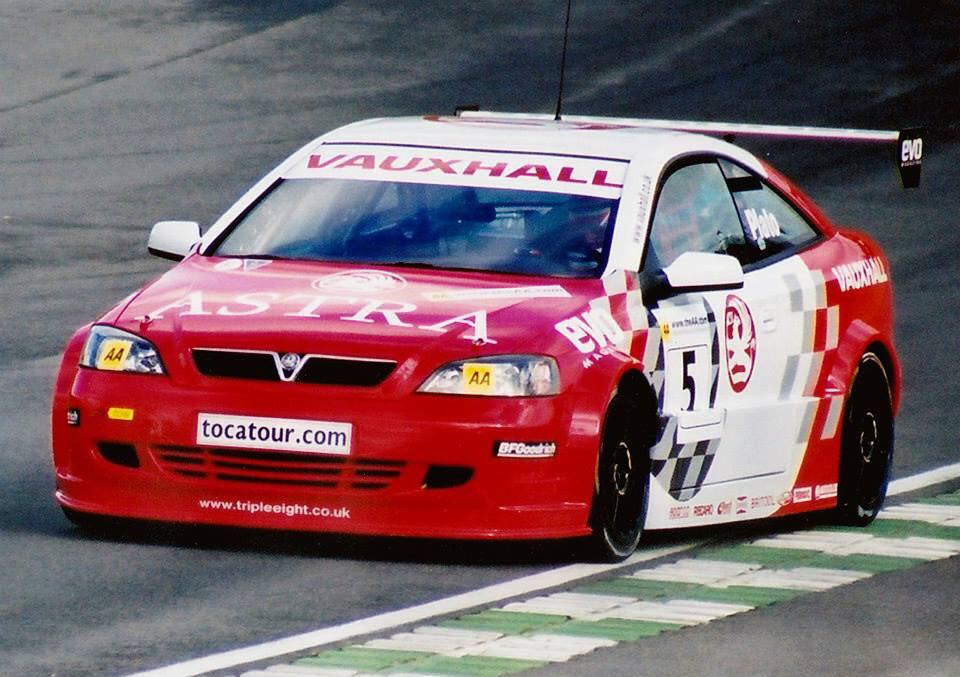
Jason Plato, Vauxhall Astra Coupe during qualifying for round 1 at Brands Hatch

=== Teams and driver information ===
==== BTC-Touring ====
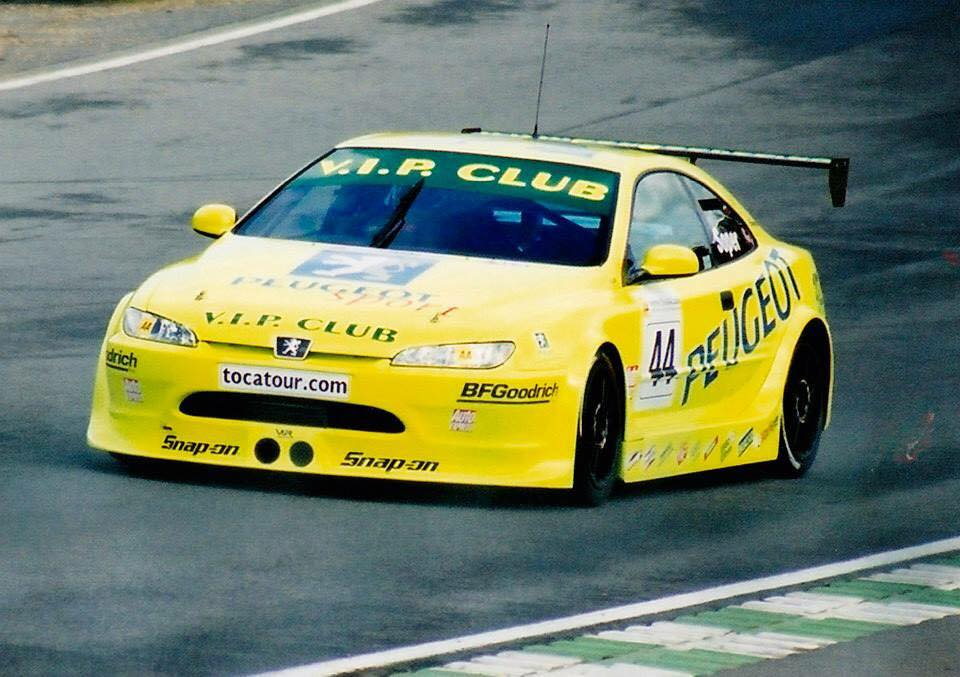
Steve Soper Peugeot 406 Coupe during qualifying for round 1 at Brands Hatch

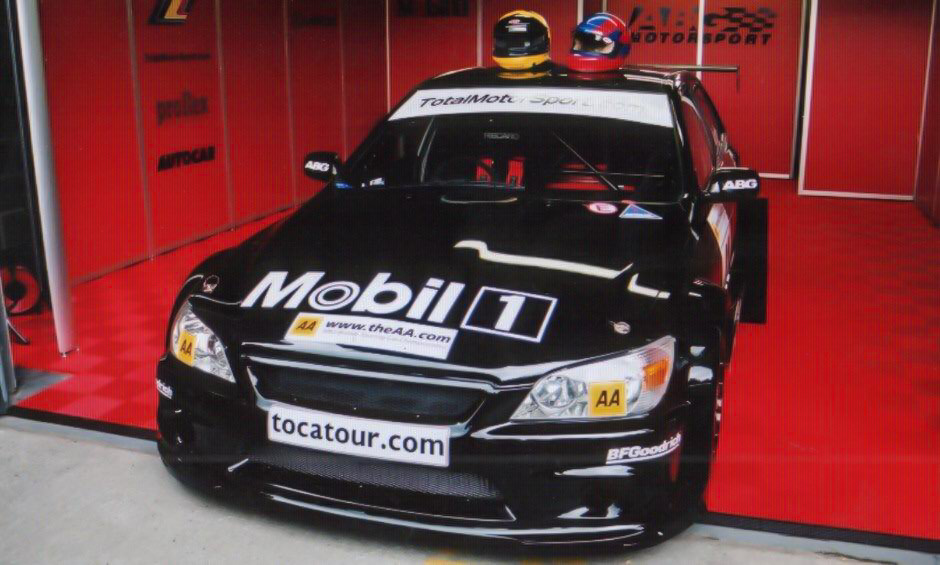
ABG Motorsport Lexus at Brands Hatch. The car was unable to start due to a missing part.

The new rules provoked different reactions from the three remaining manufacturers in the BTCC. Ford withdrew completely, whereas Honda took a year out to develop a car to the new rules. Vauxhall immediately set to work on a new car and entered four new-regulation Astra Coupes built and run by Triple 8 Racing.

Yvan Muller and Jason Plato remained in first two entries under the Vauxhall Motorsport banner, while James Thompson moved from Honda to partner Phil Bennett, debuting in the BTCC, in Egg Sport-liveried cars. Bennett received a race ban after five separate incidents at Croft for the sprint race at the following round but wouldn't compete in the feature race either as Vauxhall chose to withdraw him from the weekend. Formula 3 racer Andy Priaulx took over his seat for the two races.

Peugeot re-entered the series with a trio of Vic Lee Racing-prepared 406 Coupes driven by Matt Neal (who left after the first round to compete in the European Touring Car Championship for Team Dynamics), Class B graduate Dan Eaves and touring car veteran Steve Soper. The team re-expanded to three cars for Donington, as superbike racer Aaron Slight made a guest appearance whilst evaluating a full-time switch to four wheels the following year.

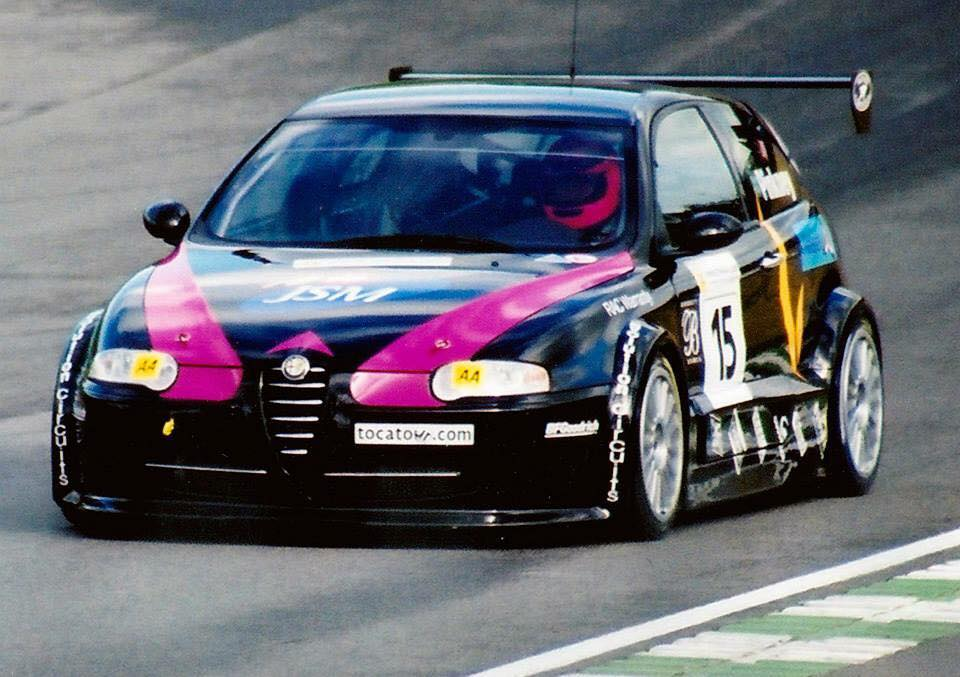
David Pinkney Alfa Romeo 147 during qualifying for round1 at Brands Hatch

MG began development of a pair of ZS' built to the new regulations courtesy of West Surrey Racing, these made guest appearances in the hands of ex-Ford and Nissan driver Anthony Reid and former Formula 3 and STW racer Warren Hughes during closing rounds of the season in preparation for a full campaign in 2002.

Two small independent teams filled out the Touring class grid ambitiously entering new cars: JSM fielded a pair of Alfa Romeo 147s in an assault headed by 1992 BTCC champion Tim Harvey in a driver/team manager role. After original intended driver Darren Malkin lost his sponsorship deal prior to the start of the season, the team hired Tom Ferrier, who had originally signed for Vauxhall. It was planned for Harvey to drive the car when Ferrier was fulfilling other driving commitments in the European Super Production Championship. The second car was driven by David Pinkney until he walked away from the team after the Silverstone rounds in June which would see Harvey take over and drive alongside Ferrier. Former independent driver Mark Blair competed in two rounds in place of Ferrier later in the year.

ABG Motorsport entered a Lexus IS200 for Kurt Luby, with plans to expand to a second car for Brazilian GT racer Thomas Erdos later in the year. This did not come off and instead Erdos took Luby's drive mid-season when the Englishman walked away from the team, while the running of the car was taken over by Total Motorsport. After a failed attempt to hire former Volvo and Vauxhall works driver Vincent Radermecker, the car was driven by driver-turned-motoring journalist Steve Sutcliffe as a guest entry in the final round.

==== BTC-Production ====
With a low entry in the top class, the grid relied largely on the super production specification base Production class (formerly Class B) to boost grid numbers in this transitional year.

HTML headed the Peugeot entry with Roger Moen and Simon Harrison moving across from the National Saloon Cup, Tech-Speed Motorsport also entered a pair of 306s for MG-F racers Annie Templeton and young gun Paul O'Neill, and teenager Tom Boardman drove a fifth 306 for his family-run team.

Barwell Motorsport fielded a pair of Honda Accords for former works Honda driver 2000 Class B runner up James Kaye and Peter Cate who was replaced by Simon Graves following the first three rounds. Tiff Needell appeared in the second car at Oulton Park in August but was ineligible for points. There were also Accords for Total Control Racing's Jim Edwards Jnr and Synchro Motorsport's Dave Allan. Mark Lemmer raced in place of Allan at Croft and Snetterton.

The Honda contingent was also bolstered by businessman John Batchelor's pair of B&Q-backed Integras, entered for himself (as John B-and-Q) and Nick Beaumont. Joanna Clarke raced in place of Batchelor for three rounds mid season. Nick James also appeared for a handful of rounds in the Integra he raced in the second half of 2000.

The Ford Focus was also competitive in the hands of GR Motorsport, who entered a quartet of cars for youngsters Gareth Howell and Mat Jackson, and veterans Rick Kraemer and Richard Meins. Mein's car was taken over by future champion Gordon Shedden for the Knockhill races. Phil Andrews was also listed as one of the team's intended drivers but never raced.

GA Janspeed entered two Alfa Romeo 156's, campaigned by Gavin Pyper and Colin Blair, a third entry for Italian Antonio Russo was also entered but never raced. Rob Collard returned now driving a self-entered Renault Clio.

Cranfield Automotive entered Mitsubishi Carismas for reigning National Saloon champion Toni Ruokonen, James Levy and Sandro Proietti but the latter was replaced by Andy Neate before the season started. Neate only raced at Brands Hatch and Levy only raced at Oulton Park, the rest of the time, Ruokonen was the team's sole entry.

Bintcliffe Sport ran a single Nissan Primera for Matt Kelly but abandoned their efforts early in the year. Later in the season, the first Proton entered in the BTCC, a Satria run by TH Motorsport for Steven Wood, appeared at Silverstone and Brands Hatch.

Having initially been linked to running Astras in the Touring Class, Edenbridge Racing secured a deal to run two BMW 320is but these wouldn't appear until 2002.

=== Other changes ===
- Alan Gow stepped down as the series boss, replaced by Richard West.
- BF Goodrich replaced Michelin as the control tyre for the series.
- Honda and Ford left the series, although Peugeot returned as a works entry after withdrawing at the end of the 1998 season.
- The independents trophy was not implemented during the season.
- More conventional qualifying sessions returned, replacing the one-lap showdown system of previous years
- The first race held outside of the United Kingdom took place in June when the championship visited Mondello Park in Ireland.

== Teams and drivers ==
Team	Car	No.	Drivers	Rounds
Works Entries
MG Sport & Racing	MG ZS	2	(United Kingdom) Anthony Reid^{†}	11–13
MG Sport & Racing	MG ZS	20	(United Kingdom) Warren Hughes^{†}	11–13
Vauxhall Motorsport	Vauxhall Astra Coupé	4	(France) Yvan Muller	All
Vauxhall Motorsport	Vauxhall Astra Coupé	5	(United Kingdom) Jason Plato	All
egg:sport	Vauxhall Astra Coupé	9	(United Kingdom) James Thompson	All
egg:sport	Vauxhall Astra Coupé	18	(United Kingdom) Andy Priaulx	10
egg:sport	Vauxhall Astra Coupé	27	(United Kingdom) Phil Bennett	1–9, 11–13
Peugeot Sport UK	Peugeot 406 Coupé	8	(United Kingdom) Matt Neal	1
Peugeot Sport UK	Peugeot 406 Coupé	22	(United Kingdom) Dan Eaves	All
Peugeot Sport UK	Peugeot 406 Coupé	44	(United Kingdom) Steve Soper	All
Peugeot Sport UK	Peugeot 406 Coupé	111	(New Zealand) Aaron Slight^{†}	6
Independent Entries
JS Motorsport	Alfa Romeo 147	14	(United Kingdom) Tom Ferrier	2, 7–9, 12–13
JS Motorsport	Alfa Romeo 147	15	(United Kingdom) Dave Pinkney	1–4
JS Motorsport	Alfa Romeo 147	16	(United Kingdom) Tim Harvey	3–4, 9–13
JS Motorsport	Alfa Romeo 147	17	(United Kingdom) Mark Blair	10–11
ABG Motorsport	Lexus IS200	41	(United Kingdom) Kurt Luby	2–6
ABG Motorsport	Lexus IS200	42	(Brazil) Tommy Erdos	7–9
Total Motorsport	Lexus IS200	42	(Brazil) Tommy Erdos	10–12
Total Motorsport	Lexus IS200	43	(United Kingdom) Steve Sutcliffe^{†}	13
Production Entries
HTML	Peugeot 306 GTi	50	(Norway) Roger Möen	All
HTML	Peugeot 306 GTi	60	(United Kingdom) Simon Harrison	All
TCR/Interactive Network Solutions	Honda Accord	51	(United Kingdom) Jim Edwards Jr.	1–4, 6–10
GR Motorsport	Ford Focus	52	(United Kingdom) Gordon Shedden	7
GR Motorsport	Ford Focus	94	(United Kingdom) Gareth Howell	All
GR Motorsport	Ford Focus	95	(United Kingdom) Phil Andrews	None
GR Motorsport	Ford Focus	96	(United Kingdom) Rick Kraemer	1, 3–13
GR Motorsport	Ford Focus	97	(United Kingdom) Richard Meins	1–6, 9–11, 13
GR Motorsport	Ford Focus	98	(United Kingdom) Mat Jackson	All
Team B&Q/Talksport Radio	Honda Integra Type-R	53	(United Kingdom) Joanna Clarke	7–9
Team B&Q/Talksport Radio	Honda Integra Type-R	54	(United Kingdom) Nick Beaumont	1–4, 6–12
Team B&Q/Talksport Radio	Honda Integra Type-R	55	(United Kingdom) John B&Q	1–4, 6, 10, 12–13
Tech-Speed Motorsport	Peugeot 306 GTi	58	(United Kingdom) Paul O'Neill	All
Tech-Speed Motorsport	Peugeot 306 GTi	59	(United Kingdom) Annie Templeton	All
Collard Racing	Renault Clio 172	62	(United Kingdom) Rob Collard	1–8, 10–11, 13
GA-Janspeed Racing	Alfa Romeo 156	63	(Italy) Antonio Russo	None
GA-Janspeed Racing	Alfa Romeo 156	64	(United Kingdom) Gavin Pyper	All
GA-Janspeed Racing	Alfa Romeo 156	65	(United Kingdom) Colin Blair	All
Team Kaliber Sport with Barwell	Honda Accord	66	(United Kingdom) Peter Cate	1–3
Team Kaliber Sport with Barwell	Honda Accord	88	(United Kingdom) James Kaye	All
Team Kaliber Sport with Barwell	Honda Accord	89	(United Kingdom) Tiff Needell^{†}	10
Team Kaliber Sport with Barwell	Honda Accord	99	(United Kingdom) Simon Graves	4–9, 11–13
Synchro Motorsport	Honda Accord	68	(United Kingdom) Mark Lemmer	8–9
Synchro Motorsport	Honda Accord	70	(United Kingdom) Dave Allan	1–4, 6–7, 10–13
Tom Boardman Racing	Peugeot 306 GTi	77	(United Kingdom) Tom Boardman	All
Cranfield Automotive Management	Mitsubishi Carisma	78	(United Kingdom) James Levy	3
Cranfield Automotive Management	Mitsubishi Carisma	79	(Finland) Toni Ruokonen	1–5
Cranfield Automotive Management	Mitsubishi Carisma	80	(United Kingdom) Andy Neate	1
Bintcliffe Sport Racing	Nissan Primera	84	(United Kingdom) Matt Kelly	1, 4
Arnold James Sport	Honda Integra Type-R	85	(United Kingdom) Nick James	4, 8, 12
TH Motorsport	Proton Satria GTi	86	(United Kingdom) Steve Wood	11, 13

^{†} Not eligible for points.

There was no Independent Cup in 2001.

- Antonio Russo and Phil Andrews were on the official entry list but neither raced.

== Race calendar and winners ==
All races were held in the United Kingdom (excepting Mondello Park round that held in Ireland).

Round		Circuit	Date	Pole position	Fastest lap	Winning driver	Winning team	Production class winner
1	R1	Brands Hatch (Indy), Kent	16 April	(France) Yvan Muller	(France) Yvan Muller (United Kingdom) Jason Plato	(France) Yvan Muller	Vauxhall Motorsport	(United Kingdom) Simon Harrison†
1	R2	Brands Hatch (Indy), Kent	16 April	(France) Yvan Muller	(France) Yvan Muller	(United Kingdom) James Thompson	egg:sport	(United Kingdom) James Kaye
2	R3	Thruxton Circuit, Hampshire	7 May	(United Kingdom) Jason Plato	(France) Yvan Muller	(United Kingdom) Jason Plato	Vauxhall Motorsport	(United Kingdom) Simon Harrison
2	R4	Thruxton Circuit, Hampshire	7 May	(United Kingdom) James Thompson	(United Kingdom) James Thompson	(France) Yvan Muller	Vauxhall Motorsport	(United Kingdom) James Kaye
3	R5	Oulton Park (Island), Cheshire	20 May	(France) Yvan Muller	(United Kingdom) Jason Plato	(France) Yvan Muller	Vauxhall Motorsport	(United Kingdom) Simon Harrison
3	R6	Oulton Park (Island), Cheshire	20 May	(France) Yvan Muller	(United Kingdom) Jason Plato	(France) Yvan Muller	Vauxhall Motorsport	(United Kingdom) Gavin Pyper
4	R7	Silverstone Circuit (International), Northamptonshire	2 June	(France) Yvan Muller	(United Kingdom) James Thompson	(United Kingdom) Jason Plato	Vauxhall Motorsport	(United Kingdom) Simon Harrison
4	R8	Silverstone Circuit (International), Northamptonshire	2 June	(France) Yvan Muller	(France) Yvan Muller	(United Kingdom) Jason Plato	Vauxhall Motorsport	(Norway) Roger Möen
5	R9	Mondello Park	17 June	(France) Yvan Muller	(France) Yvan Muller	(France) Yvan Muller	Vauxhall Motorsport	(United Kingdom) James Kaye
5	R10	Mondello Park	17 June	(France) Yvan Muller	(France) Yvan Muller	(France) Yvan Muller	Vauxhall Motorsport	(United Kingdom) James Kaye
6	R11	Donington Park (Grand Prix), Leicestershire	1 July	(United Kingdom) James Thompson	(United Kingdom) James Thompson	(United Kingdom) James Thompson	egg:sport	(Norway) Roger Möen
6	R12	Donington Park (Grand Prix), Leicestershire	1 July	(United Kingdom) James Thompson	(United Kingdom) James Thompson	(United Kingdom) Jason Plato	Vauxhall Motorsport	(United Kingdom) Mat Jackson
7	R13	Knockhill Circuit, Fife	22 July	(United Kingdom) Jason Plato	(United Kingdom) Jason Plato	(United Kingdom) Jason Plato	Vauxhall Motorsport	(United Kingdom) Simon Graves
7	R14	Knockhill Circuit, Fife	22 July	(United Kingdom) Jason Plato	(United Kingdom) Jason Plato	(United Kingdom) Jason Plato	Vauxhall Motorsport	(United Kingdom) Gordon Shedden
8	R15	Snetterton Circuit, Norfolk	4 August	(United Kingdom) Jason Plato	(France) Yvan Muller	(France) Yvan Muller	Vauxhall Motorsport	(United Kingdom) Simon Graves
8	R16	Snetterton Circuit, Norfolk	4 August	(United Kingdom) Jason Plato	(United Kingdom) Jason Plato	(United Kingdom) James Thompson	egg:sport	(United Kingdom) Gareth Howell
9	R17	Croft Circuit, North Yorkshire	12 August	(United Kingdom) Phil Bennett	(France) Yvan Muller	(United Kingdom) Jason Plato	Vauxhall Motorsport	(Norway) Roger Möen
9	R18	Croft Circuit, North Yorkshire	12 August	(United Kingdom) James Thompson	(France) Yvan Muller	(France) Yvan Muller	Vauxhall Motorsport	(United Kingdom) Jim Edwards Jr.
10	R19	Oulton Park (Island), Cheshire	26 August	(United Kingdom) Andy Priaulx	(United Kingdom) Jason Plato	(France) Yvan Muller	Vauxhall Motorsport	(Norway) Roger Möen
10	R20	Oulton Park (Island), Cheshire	26 August	(United Kingdom) Andy Priaulx	(United Kingdom) Jason Plato	(United Kingdom) Jason Plato	Vauxhall Motorsport	(Norway) Roger Möen
11	R21	Silverstone Circuit (International), Northamptonshire	9 September	(United Kingdom) Phil Bennett	(United Kingdom) Phil Bennett	(United Kingdom) Phil Bennett	egg:sport	(Norway) Roger Möen
11	R22	Silverstone Circuit (International), Northamptonshire	9 September	(United Kingdom) Phil Bennett	(France) Yvan Muller	(United Kingdom) James Thompson	egg:sport	(United Kingdom) James Kaye
12	R23	Donington Park (Grand Prix), Leicestershire	23 September	(United Kingdom) Jason Plato	(United Kingdom) Jason Plato	(United Kingdom) Phil Bennett	egg:sport	(United Kingdom) Simon Graves
12	R24	Donington Park (Grand Prix), Leicestershire	23 September	(United Kingdom) Jason Plato	(United Kingdom) Jason Plato	(France) Yvan Muller	Vauxhall Motorsport	(Norway) Roger Möen
13	R25	Brands Hatch (Indy), Kent	7 October	(France) Yvan Muller	(France) Yvan Muller	(United Kingdom) Anthony Reid	MG Sport & Racing	(United Kingdom) Simon Graves
13	R26	Brands Hatch (Indy), Kent	7 October	(United Kingdom) Warren Hughes	(United Kingdom) Jason Plato	(United Kingdom) Phil Bennett	egg:sport	(United Kingdom) Gavin Pyper

† Both classes had their own separate races.

== Championship results tables ==
Points system
**1st**	**2nd**	**3rd**	**4th**	**5th**	**6th**	**7th**	**8th**	**9th**	**10th**	Pole position	Fastest lap	Lead a lap in feature race
15	12	10	8	6	5	4	3	2	1	1	1	1

- No driver may collect more than one "Lead a Lap" point per race no matter how many laps they lead.
- Any Production class drivers who lead in their class for at least a lap will get awarded a point.

=== Drivers' Championship ===
(key)

Pos.	Driver	BRH		THR		OUL		SIL		MON		DON		KNO		SNE		CRO		OUL		SIL		DON		BRH		Pts
Touring Class (BTC-T)
1	(United Kingdom) Jason Plato	2	2*	**1**	2*	9	Ret*	3	1*	17	2*	2	1*	**2**	**1***	**3**	**3***	2	2	3	1*	3	3*	**5**	**3***	3	2	**336**
2	(France) Yvan Muller	**1**	**Ret***	2	1*	**7**	**1***	**4**	**3***	**1**	**1***	3	3*	4	Ret	2	2*	3	1*	1	Ret	2	2*	6	1*	**4**	**Ret***	**318**
3	(United Kingdom) James Thompson	3	1*	3	**4**	8	2	5	4	3	3	**1**	**2***	7	3	6	1*	5	**3***	4	2	4	1	Ret	2	5	Ret	**276**
4	(United Kingdom) Phil Bennett	4	3*	4	3*	11	Ret	6	2	15	4	4	Ret	9	2*	Ret	6	**19**	Ret			**1**	**Ret***	4	Ret	6	1*	**173**
5	(United Kingdom) Dan Eaves	5	6	16	Ret	18	Ret*	10	Ret	10	Ret	5	4*	Ret	DNS	21	Ret	13	5	9	3	10	4	Ret	5	8	3*	**115**
6	(United Kingdom) Steve Soper	7	4*	Ret	Ret	16	Ret	11	6	4	Ret	6	5*	Ret	4*	20	4	12	Ret	Ret	Ret*	20	8	20	Ret	Ret	DNS	**93**
7	(Brazil) Thomas Erdos													8	Ret	11	5	8	4	11	6*	14	6	14	4			**72**
8	(United Kingdom) Tim Harvey					17	3*	DNS	Ret			DNS	DNS			DNS	DNS	Ret	Ret	8	5	16	Ret	13	Ret	7	Ret	**43**
9	(United Kingdom) Kurt Luby			Ret	6	20	5	15	5	8	Ret	Ret	DNS															**33**
10	(United Kingdom) Tom Ferrier			Ret	DNS									Ret	DNS	Ret	DNS	20	Ret					12	Ret*	Ret	4	**20**
11	(United Kingdom) Andy Priaulx																			**2**	**Ret***							**15**
12	(United Kingdom) Mark Blair																			15	4	15	Ret					**15**
13	(United Kingdom) David Pinkney	Ret	Ret	12	Ret	Ret	DNS	19	7																			**14**
14	(United Kingdom) Matt Neal	6	5																									**11**
drivers ineligible for points
–	(United Kingdom) Anthony Reid																					12	7	10	Ret	1	Ret	**0**
–	(United Kingdom) Warren Hughes																					Ret	5*	11	8	Ret	**Ret***	**0**
–	(New Zealand) Aaron Slight											7	Ret*															**0**
–	(United Kingdom) Steve Sutcliffe																									9	Ret	**0**
Production Class (BTC-P)
1	(United Kingdom) Simon Harrison	**8**	**Ret***	**5**	**Ret**	**1**	**7**	**1**	**10***	9	8	**17**	Ret	5	7	**8**	**10**	18	12	6	8*	6	10	**Ret**	**7***	16	10	**227**
2	(United Kingdom) James Kaye	Ret	7*	7	5*	2	Ret	9	9*	2	5*	12	Ret	6	6	9	Ret	6	10	13	10	Ret	9*	3	14	10	7	**220**
3	(Norway) Roger Möen	9	8*	Ret	Ret*	3	Ret	2	8*	6	11	8	7*	Ret	10	17	14	**1**	**Ret**	**5**	**7***	**5**	**Ret**	2	6*	12	NC	**212**
4	(United Kingdom) Mat Jackson	11	9	10	8	12	Ret	8	Ret	11	7	10	6*	Ret	Ret	7	9	16	7	10	13	8	Ret	Ret	9*	11	12	**151**
5	(United Kingdom) Gareth Howell	10	11	Ret	Ret	4	6	Ret	11	5	Ret	Ret	DNS	Ret	DNS	4	7*	7	8	12	11	13	Ret	7	Ret	20	6*	**139**
6	(United Kingdom) Gavin Pyper	14	10	Ret	DNS	5	4*	Ret	Ret	7	Ret	9	**Ret***	11	Ret	Ret	Ret*	4	Ret	7	9	9	12*	9	Ret	Ret	5*	120
7	(United Kingdom) Simon Graves							14	Ret	**Ret**	**Ret***	Ret	8*	1	Ret*	1	8*	9	11			Ret	Ret	1	Ret*	2	8*	111
8	(United Kingdom) Paul O'Neill	Ret	12	Ret	Ret	Ret	DNS	7	12	Ret	6	Ret	Ret	12	11	13	Ret	10	Ret	Ret	DNS	Ret	11	8	DNS	**19**	**9**	**74**
9	(United Kingdom) Jim Edwards Jr.	Ret	15	9	9	14	Ret	13	13			13	12	15	9	12	11	14	6*	Ret	Ret							**71**
10	(United Kingdom) Rick Kraemer	19	16			15	9	18	15	13	10	14	10	13	13	Ret	15	15	13	17	12	Ret	13	15	15	13	15	**70**
11	(United Kingdom) Tom Boardman	15	17	Ret	10	10	8	Ret	17	12	Ret	18	Ret	14	Ret	15	13	DNS	DNS	16	18	7	Ret*	16	12	14	11	**66**
12	(United Kingdom) Dave Allan	17	19	8	15	21	11	16	14			15	9	Ret	DNS					18	14	17	14	19	Ret	18	13	**49**
13	(United Kingdom) Rob Collard	13	DNS	Ret	NC	Ret	DNS	12	Ret	Ret	DNS	11	Ret	10	8	5	Ret	DNS	DNS	DNS	DNS	11	Ret	DNS	DNS	17	Ret	46
14	(United Kingdom) Richard Meins	20	Ret	11	11	19	10	Ret	18	14	Ret	Ret	Ret					Ret	9	20	15	19	NC			15	14	**34**
15	(United Kingdom) Gordon Shedden													**3**	**5***													**30**
16	(United Kingdom) Nick Beaumont	18	18	6	12	Ret	Ret	20	19			DNS	Ret	Ret	12	14	12	Ret	DNS	Ret	DNS	Ret	16	Ret	11			29
17	(United Kingdom) Peter Cate	16	13	15	7	6	12																					**27**
18	(United Kingdom) Colin Blair	Ret	DNS	Ret	Ret	22	13	17	Ret	Ret	9	Ret	Ret	Ret	Ret	16	Ret	17	Ret	19	Ret	18	Ret	17	10	Ret	Ret	**22**
19	(United Kingdom) Annie Templeton	21	Ret	13	13	Ret	Ret	21	Ret	16	12	16	11	Ret	Ret	19	Ret	Ret	14	21	16	21	Ret	18	Ret	21	17	**21**
20	(Finland) Toni Ruokonen	12	14	Ret	Ret	13	Ret	NC	20	Ret	Ret																	**11**
21	(United Kingdom) Mark Lemmer															10	16	11	Ret*									**10**
22	(United Kingdom) John B&Q	22	20	14	14	23	14	22	21			Ret	13							Ret	17	DNS	DNS	Ret	Ret	Ret	Ret	**8**
23	(United Kingdom) Nick James							Ret	DNS							Ret	Ret					DNS	DNS	NC	13			**4**
24	(United Kingdom) Steve Wood																					22	15			Ret	16	**4**
25	(United Kingdom) Joanna Clarke													16	14	18	Ret	Ret	DNS									**2**
26	(United Kingdom) Matt Kelly	Ret	DNS					23	16																			**2**
–	(United Kingdom) Andy Neate	Ret	Ret			DNS	DNS																					**0**
–	(United Kingdom) James Levy					Ret	Ret																					**0**
drivers ineligible for points
–	(United Kingdom) Tiff Needell																			14	DNS							**0**
Pos.	Driver	BRH		THR		OUL		SIL		MON		DON		KNO		SNE		CRO		OUL		SIL		DON		BRH		Pts

- Note: **bold** signifies pole position in class (1 point awarded all races), italics signifies fastest lap in class (1 point awarded all races) and * signifies that driver lead feature race for at least one lap and also in the Production class when a driver leads the class for at least a lap (1 point given in both).
- ^{†} Not eligible for points

=== Manufacturers Championship ===
Pos	Manufacturer	BRH		THR		OUL		SIL		MON		DON		KNO		SNE		CRO		OUL		SIL		DON		BRH		Pts
1	Vauxhall / Vauxhall Motorsport/egg:sport	1	1	1	1	7	1	3	1	1	1	1	1	2	1	2	1	2	1	1	1	2	1	5	1	3	2	886
1	Vauxhall / Vauxhall Motorsport/egg:sport	2	2	2	2	8	2	4	3	3	2	2	2	4	3	3	2	3	2	3	2	3	2	6	2	4	Ret	886
1	Vauxhall / Vauxhall Motorsport/egg:sport	3	Ret	3	4	9	Ret	5	4	17	3	3	3	7	Ret	6	3	5	3	4	Ret	4	3	Ret	3	5	Ret	886
2	Peugeot / Peugeot Sport UK	5	4	15	Ret	16	Ret	10	5	4	Ret	5	4	Ret	4	20	4	12	5	9	3	10	4	20	5	8	3	271
2	Peugeot / Peugeot Sport UK	6	5	Ret	Ret	18	Ret	11	Ret	5	Ret	6	5	Ret	DNS	21	Ret	13	Ret	Ret	Ret	20	8	Ret	Ret	Ret	DNS	271
2	Peugeot / Peugeot Sport UK	7	6									7	Ret															271
manufacturers ineligible for points
–	MG / MG Sport & Racing																					12	5	10	8	1	Ret	0
–	MG / MG Sport & Racing																					Ret	7	11	Ret	Ret	Ret	0
Pos	Manufacturer	BRH		THR		OUL		SIL		MON		DON		KNO		SNE		CRO		OUL		SIL		DON		BRH		Pts

=== Touring Teams Championship ===
Pos	Team	BRH	THR	OUL	SIL	MON	DON	KNO	SNE	CRO	OUL	SIL	DON	BRH	Pts
1	Vauxhall Motorsport	2	1	1	1	1	1	1	2	1	1	2	1	2	269
1	Vauxhall Motorsport	Ret	2	Ret	3	2	3	Ret	3	2	Ret	3	3	Ret	269
2	egg:sport	1	3	2	2	3	2	2	1	3	2	1	2	1	211
2	egg:sport	3	4	Ret	4	4	Ret	3	6	Ret	Ret	Ret	Ret	Ret	211
3	Peugeot Sport UK	4	Ret	Ret	5	Ret	4	4	4	5	3	4	5	3	95
3	Peugeot Sport UK	5	Ret	Ret	Ret	Ret	5	DNS	Ret	Ret	Ret	8	Ret	DNS	95
4	JS Motorsport	Ret	Ret	3	6		DNS	DNS	DNS	Ret	4	Ret	Ret	4	37
4	JS Motorsport		DNS	DNS	Ret				DNS	Ret	5	Ret	Ret	Ret	37
5	ABG Motorsport		6	5	6	Ret	DNS	Ret	5	4					32
6	Total Motorsport										6	6	4	Ret	19
teams ineligible for points
–	MG Sport & Racing											5	8	Ret	0
–	MG Sport & Racing											7	Ret	Ret	0
Pos	Team	BRH	THR	OUL	SIL	MON	DON	KNO	SNE	CRO	OUL	SIL	DON	BRH	Pts

† Not eligible for points

=== Production Teams Championship ===
Pos	Team	BRH	THR	OUL	SIL	MON	DON	KNO	SNE	CRO	OUL	SIL	DON	BRH	Pts
1	GR Motorsport	9	8	6	11	7	6	5	7	7	11	13	9	6	205
1	GR Motorsport	11	11	9	15	10	10	13	9	8	12	NC	15	12	205
2	HTML	8	Ret	7	8	8	7	7	10	12	7	10	6	10	173
2	HTML	Ret	Ret	Ret	10	11	Ret	10	14	Ret	8	Ret	7	NC	173
3	Team Kaliber Sport with Barwell	7	5	12	9	5	8	6	8	10	10	9	14	7	164
3	Team Kaliber Sport with Barwell	13	7	Ret	Ret	Ret	Ret	Ret	Ret	11	DNS	Ret	Ret	8	164
4	Tech-Speed Motorsport	12	13	Ret	12	6	11	11	Ret	14	16	11	Ret	9	62
4	Tech-Speed Motorsport	Ret	Ret	DNS	Ret	12	Ret	Ret	Ret	Ret	DNS	Ret	DNS	17	62
5	GA Janspeed Racing	10	Ret	4	Ret	9	Ret	Ret	Ret	Ret	9	12	10	5	59
5	GA Janspeed Racing	DNS	DNS	13	Ret	Ret	Ret	Ret	Ret	Ret	Ret	Ret	Ret	Ret	59
6	TCR/Interactive Network Solutions	15	9	Ret	13		12	9	11	6	Ret				46
7	Synchro Motorsport	19	15	11	14		9	DNS	16	Ret	14	14	Ret	13	31
8	Tom Boardman Racing	17	10	8	17	Ret	Ret	Ret	13	DNS	18	Ret	12	11	30
9	Team B&Q/Talksport Radio	18	12	14	19		13	12	12	DNS	17	16	11	Ret	26
9	Team B&Q/Talksport Radio	20	14	Ret	21		Ret	14	Ret	DNS	DNS	DNS	Ret		26
10	Arnold James Sport				DNS				Ret			DNS	13		4
11	TH Motorsport											15		16	4
12	Cranfield Automotive Management	14	Ret	Ret	20	Ret									3
12	Cranfield Automotive Management	Ret		Ret											3
13	Collard Racing	DNS	NC	DNS	Ret	DNS	Ret	8	Ret	DNS	DNS	Ret	DNS	Ret	3
14	Bintcliffe Sport Racing	DNS			16										2
Pos	Team	BHI	THR	OUL	SIL	MON	DON	KNO	SNE	CRO	OUL	SIL	DON	BHI	Pts
