= 1998 British Touring Car Championship =

41st season of the British Touring Car Championship

1998 BTCC season

Seasons
- ← 1997 1999 →

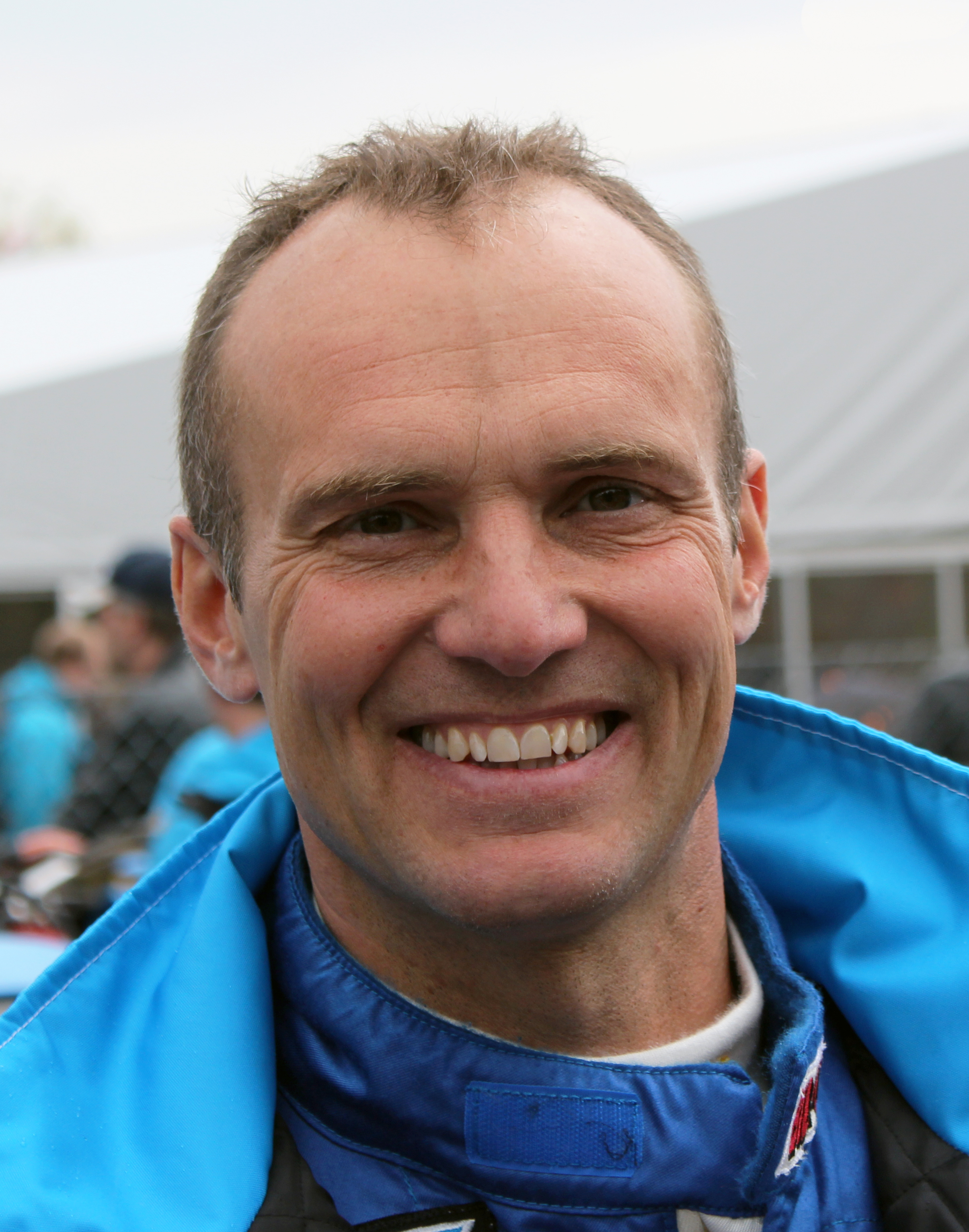
Rickard Rydell won the driver's championship in a Volvo S40.

The 1998 Auto Trader RAC British Touring Car Championship featured 26 races across 13 rounds, it commenced at Thruxton on 13 April and ended at Silverstone on 20 September.

The championship was won by Rickard Rydell in a Volvo S40, the runner-up was Anthony Reid in a Nissan Primera and James Thompson finished in third driving a Honda Accord. The Autosport Cup for Independents, a championship for privateer entries was won by Tommy Rustad in a Renault Laguna.

The video game TOCA 2 Touring Cars is based on this championship season.

== Background ==
There were three major rule changes to the championship prior to the start of the 1998 season. Race weekends were changed notably with two different types of races now elected: a shorter "sprint" race and a "feature" race, 25% longer than previous races featuring a mandatory two-tyre stop to be taken between 15 and 75% distance. Qualifying for the sprint race involved drivers holding a "shoot-out" style session where each driver was sent out one of a time and were given a single timed lap to determine their starting position with the slowest driver from feature qualifying going last and fastest going first. Qualifying for the feature race remained the same as the previous season.

Four wheel drive systems were also banned for 1998, a system used notably by 1996 champions Audi.

The independents trophy previously known as the 'Total Cup for Independents' became the 'Autosport Cup for Independents'. The £250,000 prize fund, introduced in 1997, remained in place however at the request of the independent competitors, prize money now will be awarded on the results of each individual round rather than as a lump sum to the top three overall finishers at the end of the season. In 1998, the first independent finisher in each of the 26 rounds would receive £2,500, while second and third past the chequered flag would receive £1,250 and £500 respectively.

=== Team and driver changes ===
Eight manufacturer backed teams contested the championship with no changes to the manufacturer - team line up.

I think last year on some tracks we were not the quickest car but we ended up winning the championship because we made less mistakes than the other guys. So hopefully this year will be the same.

— Alain Menu

1997 champions Williams Renault, now in their fourth year of partnership in the BTCC, retained their driver line up of Alain Menu and Jason Plato once again driving the Laguna. The familiar yellow and blue livery was replaced by the dark green of new title sponsor Nescafe Blend 37. The team entered a third car for the final round at Silverstone for independents cup winner Tommy Rustad.

Audi were forced to abandon their four-wheel-drive A4 which helped them to the 1996 title for a more conventional front-wheel drive car. 1995 French touring car champion Yvan Muller joined the team after helping German manufacturer develop the new FWD car in the Super Tourenwagen Cup in 1997. He was joined by John Bintcliffe now in his third season with Audi with Frank Biela moving back in to Super Tourenwagen Cup.

Nissan were another team to retain their driver line-up with the experience Scots David Leslie and Anthony Reid racing a pair of RML prepared Primeras. The team entered a third car at Brands Hatch in August for former driver and then Top Gear presenter, Tiff Needell. This appeared as a feature on the popular motoring show.

Following a winter test program, Honda powered Prodrive retained Yorkshire's James Thompson with ex BMW driver Peter Kox replacing 1994 champion Gabriele Tarquini, who moved to STW to spearhead Honda's team in the 1998 Super Tourenwagen Cup.

TWR Volvo had also changed their lineup with former Ferrari, Footwork and Sauber F1 driver Gianni Morbidelli replacing Kelvin Burt, who switched to JTCC, to partner Swede Rickard Rydell who remained with the team for a fifth season.

Vauxhall engineered and run by Triple Eight continued with Derek Warwick and 1995 champion John Cleland racing the Vectra. Following the disaster with aerodynamics in 1997 Triple Eight developed the aero themselves for 1998.

One of the biggest stories going into the season was that Ford had signed 1992 Formula One champion Nigel Mansell to compete in three rounds of the championship. For all other rounds New Zealander Craig Baird, a former works BMW driver in Australia, South Africa and New Zealand, will race alongside 1991 champion Will Hoy, now in his eleventh season of BTCC competition.

Switching from Ford Paul Radisich joined Tim Harvey at Peugeot whose 406's were again run by Motor Sport Developments (MSD).

Alfa Romeo announced that they would make a comeback to the BTCC by entering later rounds of the season. Fabrizio Giovanardi and Nicola Larini were scheduled to drive the new 156 but Alfa's plans fell through, and the team never appeared.

Reigning independents champion Robb Gravett again entered his 1996 Honda Accord now run by Brookes Motorsport. A second car was entered at Oulton Park in September for Lee Brookes but didn't start either race.

Matt Neal raced a 1997 Nissan Primera run by family outfit Team Dynamics.

D.C.Cook Motorsport entered the 1997 championship winning Renault Laguna for Norwegian Tommy Rustad and for the final two meetings they also entered a Honda Accord for Paula Cook.

Mardi Gras Motorsport entered a Honda Accord for Norwegian Roger Moen until team and driver went their separate ways after the Croft rounds. The team took over the running of Mark Lemmer's Vauxhall Vectra for three meetings in the second half of the season after he split with Mint Motorsport who had run the car until Croft.

=== Season summary ===
Menu and Renault’s title defence would not be a happy one. The champion would only win three races all year, and combined with a string of retirements restricted him to only fourth in the standings. The Swiss driver would depart the team at the end of the season. Plato would have a steady season, taking a single victory and finishing directly behind his teammate in the standings.

Menu’s struggles would open the door for Volvo’s Rickard Rydell. A combination of speed and the best consistency of any driver would allow the Swede to claim the drivers title. TWR Volvo would miss out on both the teams and manufacturers championships however, partly due to the lacklustre performances of Morbidelli. The Italian was unable to match his teammate’s pace, in what would turn out to be his only season in Britain.

Nissan would have a breakthrough season. David Leslie would pick up two victories, including the first for the car at Silverstone in April. But the star of the season would be Anthony Reid, picking up eleven pole positions and seven victories, the most of any driver, and allowing Nissan to claim both the manufacturers and teams championships ahead of Volvo and Renault.

Honda’s year would be one of mixed fortunes. James Thompson would have a strong season, winning multiple races for the first time and finishing third in the standings, but teammate Peter Kox endured a tough first season in Britain due to many mechanical failures.

Audi’s campaign with their front-wheel-drive car was poor. New team leader Bintcliffe was virtually non-existent all season, whilst British championship rookie Yvan Muller showed glimpses of pace throughout the year, although it was only enough for a handful of podium finishes. The German marque would not return to the series for 1999.

The season would see a mini-renaissance for Vauxhall following a difficult 1997. Both drivers would claim race victories; Cleland would claim two, both at Donington Park, whilst Warwick would claim his in a wet race at Knockhill, before hanging up his driving gloves at the end of the year. Cleland was forced to miss a round due to injury, and was replaced by Brazilian Vectra challenge driver Flavio Figueiredo.

Ford were another team to have a year filled with ups and downs. The car seemed to be at its best in the wet, veteran Will Hoy demonstrating that with a victory at Silverstone. Kiwi Craig Baird was largely disappointing, whilst Nigel Mansell thrilled the crowds by nearly winning in the pouring rain at Donington Park, but would also voice his frustrations regarding the series’ driving standards following an incident-filled round at Brands Hatch.

Despite all the promise surrounding the team, with a strong driver line-up and the car’s success in the German championship, Peugeot would again fail to deliver. Radisich and Harvey could not keep the team off bottom place in the manufacturers race, and the French marque would be another to withdraw from the series come the end of the year.

== Teams and drivers ==
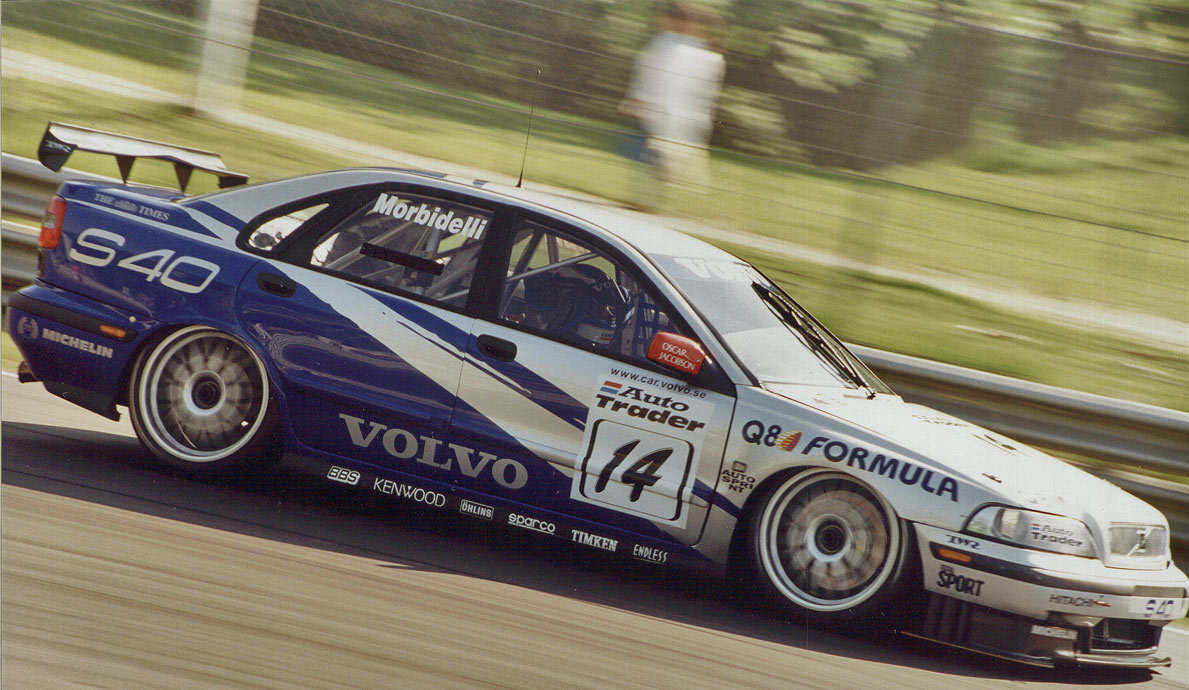
Volvo placed second in the Manufacturers Championship with its S40s

Team	Car	No.	Drivers	Rounds
Manufacturers
(France) Blend 37 Williams Renault	Renault Laguna	1	(Switzerland) Alain Menu	All
(France) Blend 37 Williams Renault	Renault Laguna	3	(United Kingdom) Jason Plato	All
(France) Blend 37 Williams Renault	Renault Laguna	21	(Norway) Tommy Rustad	13
(Sweden) Volvo S40 Racing	Volvo S40	4	(Sweden) Rickard Rydell	All
(Sweden) Volvo S40 Racing	Volvo S40	14	(Italy) Gianni Morbidelli	All
(Japan) Team Honda Sport	Honda Accord	5	(United Kingdom) James Thompson	All
(Japan) Team Honda Sport	Honda Accord	50	(Netherlands) Peter Kox	All
(United Kingdom) Audi Sport UK	Audi A4	7	(United Kingdom) John Bintcliffe	All
(United Kingdom) Audi Sport UK	Audi A4	12	(France) Yvan Muller	All
(United Kingdom) Vodafone Nissan Racing	Nissan Primera GT	8	(United Kingdom) David Leslie	All
(United Kingdom) Vodafone Nissan Racing	Nissan Primera GT	23	(United Kingdom) Anthony Reid	All
(United Kingdom) Vodafone Nissan Racing	Nissan Primera GT	24	(United Kingdom) Tiff Needell	11
(France) Esso Ultron Team Peugeot	Peugeot 406	9	(United Kingdom) Tim Harvey	All
(France) Esso Ultron Team Peugeot	Peugeot 406	11	(New Zealand) Paul Radisich	All
(New Zealand) Ford Mondeo Racing with Reynard	Ford Mondeo	32	(United Kingdom) Will Hoy	All
(New Zealand) Ford Mondeo Racing with Reynard	Ford Mondeo	33	(New Zealand) Craig Baird	1–5, 7–10
(New Zealand) Ford Mondeo Racing with Reynard	Ford Mondeo	55	(United Kingdom) Nigel Mansell	6, 11, 13
(Italy) Alfa Romeo	Alfa Romeo 156	56	(Italy) Nicola Larini	None
(Italy) Alfa Romeo	Alfa Romeo 156	57	(Italy) Fabrizio Giovanardi	None
(United Kingdom) Vauxhall Sport	Vauxhall Vectra	88	(United Kingdom) Derek Warwick	All
(United Kingdom) Vauxhall Sport	Vauxhall Vectra	98	(United Kingdom) John Cleland	1–8, 10–13
(United Kingdom) Vauxhall Sport	Vauxhall Vectra	99	(Brazil) Flavio Figueiredo	9
Independents
(United Kingdom) Mint Motorsport	Vauxhall Vectra	16	(United Kingdom) Mark Lemmer	1–7
(Norway) Mardi Gras Motorsport	Vauxhall Vectra	16	(United Kingdom) Mark Lemmer	9, 11, 13
(Norway) Mardi Gras Motorsport	Honda Accord	17	(Norway) Roger Möen	1–7
(Sweden) Janco Motorsport	Opel Vectra	19	(Sweden) Jan Brunstedt	None
(Sweden) Janco Motorsport	Opel Vectra	20	(Sweden) Thomas Johansson	None
(United Kingdom) DC Cook Motorsport	Renault Laguna	21	(Norway) Tommy Rustad	1–12
(United Kingdom) DC Cook Motorsport	Honda Accord	22	(United Kingdom) Paula Cook	12–13
(United Kingdom) Brookes Motorsport	Honda Accord	28	(United Kingdom) Lee Brookes	12
(United Kingdom) Brookes Motorsport	Honda Accord	29	(United Kingdom) Robb Gravett	All
(United Kingdom) Team Dynamics Max Power	Nissan Primera GT	77	(United Kingdom) Matt Neal	All

- ^1 Despite being on the entry list, the Alfa Romeo team did not contest any races.
- Janco Motorsport entered but never actually raced.

== Race calendar and results ==
All races were held in the United Kingdom.

Round		Circuit	Date	Pole position	Fastest lap	Winning driver	Winning team	Winning independent
1	R1	Thruxton Circuit, Hampshire	13 April	(Sweden) Rickard Rydell	(Sweden) Rickard Rydell	(Sweden) Rickard Rydell	Volvo S40 Racing	(United Kingdom) Mark Lemmer
1	R2	Thruxton Circuit, Hampshire	13 April	(Sweden) Rickard Rydell	(Switzerland) Alain Menu	(Switzerland) Alain Menu	Blend 37 Williams Renault	(United Kingdom) Matt Neal
2	R3	Silverstone Circuit (International), Northamptonshire	26 April	(United Kingdom) James Thompson	(United Kingdom) David Leslie	(United Kingdom) David Leslie	Vodafone Nissan Racing	(United Kingdom) Robb Gravett
2	R4	Silverstone Circuit (International), Northamptonshire	26 April	(United Kingdom) Jason Plato	(United Kingdom) James Thompson	(United Kingdom) Will Hoy	Ford Mondeo Racing	(United Kingdom) Robb Gravett
3	R5	Donington Park (National), Leicestershire	4 May	(Sweden) Rickard Rydell	(United Kingdom) David Leslie	(United Kingdom) John Cleland	Vauxhall Sport	(United Kingdom) Matt Neal
3	R6	Donington Park (National), Leicestershire	4 May	(United Kingdom) David Leslie	(United Kingdom) David Leslie	(United Kingdom) David Leslie	Vodafone Nissan Racing	(United Kingdom) Matt Neal
4	R7	Brands Hatch (Indy), Kent	17 May	(Sweden) Rickard Rydell	(United Kingdom) Anthony Reid	(Sweden) Rickard Rydell	Volvo S40 Racing	(Norway) Tommy Rustad
4	R8	Brands Hatch (Indy), Kent	17 May	(Sweden) Rickard Rydell	(United Kingdom) Anthony Reid	(Sweden) Rickard Rydell	Volvo S40 Racing	(United Kingdom) Matt Neal
5	R9	Oulton Park (Fosters), Cheshire	25 May	(Switzerland) Alain Menu	(Switzerland) Alain Menu	(Switzerland) Alain Menu	Blend 37 Williams Renault	(Norway) Tommy Rustad
5	R10	Oulton Park (Fosters), Cheshire	25 May	(United Kingdom) Anthony Reid	(United Kingdom) Anthony Reid	(United Kingdom) Jason Plato	Blend 37 Williams Renault	(Norway) Tommy Rustad
6	R11	Donington Park (National), Leicestershire	14 June	(United Kingdom) Anthony Reid	(Sweden) Rickard Rydell	(United Kingdom) Anthony Reid	Vodafone Nissan Racing	(United Kingdom) Robb Gravett
6	R12	Donington Park (National), Leicestershire	14 June	(United Kingdom) Anthony Reid	(United Kingdom) Anthony Reid	(United Kingdom) John Cleland	Vauxhall Sport	(United Kingdom) Matt Neal
7	R13	Croft Circuit, North Yorkshire	28 June	(United Kingdom) James Thompson	(United Kingdom) James Thompson	(United Kingdom) James Thompson	Team Honda Sport	(United Kingdom) Matt Neal
7	R14	Croft Circuit, North Yorkshire	28 June	(United Kingdom) David Leslie	(United Kingdom) David Leslie	(Sweden) Rickard Rydell	Volvo S40 Racing	(United Kingdom) Robb Gravett
8	R15	Snetterton Circuit, Norfolk	26 July	(United Kingdom) Anthony Reid	(United Kingdom) Matt Neal	(United Kingdom) Anthony Reid	Vodafone Nissan Racing	(United Kingdom) Robb Gravett
8	R16	Snetterton Circuit, Norfolk	26 July	(United Kingdom) Anthony Reid	(United Kingdom) Anthony Reid	(United Kingdom) James Thompson	Team Honda Sport	(United Kingdom) Robb Gravett
9	R17	Thruxton Circuit, Hampshire	2 August	(Sweden) Rickard Rydell	(United Kingdom) Anthony Reid	(United Kingdom) Anthony Reid	Vodafone Nissan Racing	(United Kingdom) Matt Neal
9	R18	Thruxton Circuit, Hampshire	2 August	(United Kingdom) Anthony Reid	(United Kingdom) Anthony Reid	(Switzerland) Alain Menu	Blend 37 Williams Renault	(United Kingdom) Mark Lemmer
10	R19	Knockhill Circuit, Fife	16 August	(United Kingdom) Anthony Reid	(United Kingdom) David Leslie	(United Kingdom) Anthony Reid	Vodafone Nissan Racing	(United Kingdom) Matt Neal
10	R20	Knockhill Circuit, Fife	16 August	(United Kingdom) Anthony Reid	(France) Yvan Muller	(United Kingdom) Derek Warwick	Vauxhall Sport	(Norway) Tommy Rustad
11	R21	Brands Hatch (Indy), Kent	31 August	(United Kingdom) Anthony Reid	(United Kingdom) Anthony Reid	(United Kingdom) Anthony Reid	Vodafone Nissan Racing	(United Kingdom) Matt Neal
11	R22	Brands Hatch (Indy), Kent	31 August	(Sweden) Rickard Rydell	(United Kingdom) Anthony Reid	(Sweden) Rickard Rydell	Volvo S40 Racing	(United Kingdom) Matt Neal
12	R23	Oulton Park (Fosters), Cheshire	13 September	(United Kingdom) Anthony Reid	(United Kingdom) Anthony Reid	(United Kingdom) James Thompson	Team Honda Sport	(Norway) Tommy Rustad
12	R24	Oulton Park (Fosters), Cheshire	13 September	(United Kingdom) Anthony Reid	(United Kingdom) James Thompson	(United Kingdom) Anthony Reid	Vodafone Nissan Racing	(United Kingdom) Matt Neal
13	R25	Silverstone Circuit (International), Northamptonshire	20 September	(Sweden) Rickard Rydell	(United Kingdom) Anthony Reid	(United Kingdom) James Thompson	Team Honda Sport	(United Kingdom) Mark Lemmer
13	R26	Silverstone Circuit (International), Northamptonshire	20 September	(United Kingdom) David Leslie	(Sweden) Rickard Rydell	(United Kingdom) Anthony Reid	Vodafone Nissan Racing	(United Kingdom) Paula Cook

== Championships standings ==
Points system
**1st**	**2nd**	**3rd**	**4th**	**5th**	**6th**	**7th**	**8th**	**9th**	**10th**	Pole position	Lead a lap in feature race
15	12	10	8	6	5	4	3	2	1	1	1

- No driver may collect more than one "Lead a Lap" point per race no matter how many laps they lead.

=== Drivers Championship ===
Pos.	Driver	THR		SIL		DON		BRH		OUL		DON		CRO		SNE		THR		KNO		BRH		OUL		SIL		Pts
1	(Sweden) Rickard Rydell	**1**	**2***	5	Ret	**3**	7*	**1**	**1***	2	2	2	Ret	4	1*	5	2*	**3**	3*	Ret	3	3	**1***	11	4	**2**	3	254
2	(United Kingdom) Anthony Reid	8	13	7	3	Ret	6	2	3	5	**3***	**1**	(**Ret***)	2	3	**1**	(**NC**)	1	**6**	**1**	**7***	**1**	2*	**2**	**1***	5	1*	239 (242)
3	(United Kingdom) James Thompson	3	3	**2**	9*	2	4	9	2	Ret	5	Ret	Ret	**1**	5	4	1*	4	5*	2	Ret	2	9*	1	Ret	1	4*	203
4	(Switzerland) Alain Menu	5	1*	Ret	Ret	4	2	3	4	**1**	4*	Ret	Ret	3	4	3	Ret	2	1*	3	4*	5	3	3	Ret	9	Ret	187
5	(United Kingdom) Jason Plato	2	4	3	**2***	Ret	5	4	Ret	4	1*	9	Ret	8	6	2	3	Ret	Ret	Ret	5	7	4*	6	2	4	6	163
6	(United Kingdom) David Leslie	7	12	1	Ret	Ret	**1***	Ret	6	3	Ret	Ret	2*	Ret	**2***	6	4	5	2*	5	9	4	Ret	4	Ret	13	**2***	148
7	(France) Yvan Muller	9	Ret	10	8	6	10	5	15	10	10	7	4*	5	10	15	5*	6	10	4	2*	11	6	5	3	3	5	110
8	(United Kingdom) John Cleland	4	6	6	7	1	3*	6	9*	7	6*	5	1*	6	8	9	Ret			13	Ret	8	Ret	9	11	8	Ret	106
9	(United Kingdom) Derek Warwick	12	5	4	6*	13	8	11	13	11	Ret	DSQ	3	9	12	10	Ret	7	Ret	9	1*	Ret	14	10	5*	7	10	70
10	(United Kingdom) Will Hoy	Ret	15	9	1*	8	16	7	Ret	8	7	3	Ret	13	9*	8	8	10	12	6	Ret	Ret	Ret	8	6	10	8	69
11	(Italy) Gianni Morbidelli	6	11	8	5	12	Ret	13	10	6	9*	6	7	10	7*	7	11	8	4*	11	Ret	Ret	Ret	Ret	9	17	Ret	56
12	(Netherlands) Peter Kox	10	7	Ret	11	7	Ret	14	7	Ret	Ret	4	Ret	7	Ret	16	Ret	13	7	7	14	6	7*	7	Ret	Ret	7*	52
13	(United Kingdom) Matt Neal	Ret	10	Ret	16	5	9	Ret	5	Ret	14	Ret	6	12	15	NC	13	12	Ret	8	Ret	9	5	13	7	Ret	Ret	35
14	(New Zealand) Paul Radisich	Ret	8	12	4	11	Ret	8	12	12	13	10	Ret	11	Ret	18	10	9	Ret	10	6	10	10	Ret	Ret	6	14	31
15	(United Kingdom) John Bintcliffe	11	9	14	17	10	14	10	8	9	8*	Ret	9	Ret	11	14	7	11	8	Ret	10	13	11	NC	Ret	12	Ret	23
16	(Norway) Tommy Rustad	16	Ret	15	13	17	12	12	14*	13	12	12	8	15	Ret	17	12	14	Ret	14	8	15	13	12	8	11	9	12
17	(United Kingdom) Tim Harvey	13	Ret	11	18	9	11	Ret	11	Ret	Ret	Ret	Ret	16	18	12	Ret	15	9*	15	11	14	8*	14	10	Ret	Ret	10
18	(United Kingdom) Nigel Mansell											Ret	5*									Ret	Ret			14	11	7
19	(United Kingdom) Robb Gravett	17	16	13	12*	15	Ret	16	17	15	16	8	Ret	Ret	14	13	9	16	Ret	Ret	12	16	12*	15	12	Ret	DNS	7
20	(New Zealand) Craig Baird	15	14	Ret	10	14	13	15	Ret	14	11			14	13	11	6	Ret	DNS	12	13*							6
21	(Norway) Roger Möen	18	17	16	15	Ret	15	18	16	16	15	11	10	Ret	16													1
22	(Brazil) Flavio Figueiredo																	17	11									0
23	(United Kingdom) Tiff Needell																					12	15					0
24	(United Kingdom) Paula Cook																							16	13	16	12	0
25	(United Kingdom) Mark Lemmer	14	Ret	Ret	14	16	Ret	17	Ret	Ret	DNS	Ret	Ret	17	17			18	13			Ret	16			15	13	0
–	(United Kingdom) Lee Brookes																							DNS	DNS			0
Pos.	Driver	THR		SIL		DON		BRH		OUL		DON		CRO		SNE		THR		KNO		BRH		OUL		SIL		Pts

- Note: **bold** signifies pole position (1 point awarded all races), italics signifies fastest lap

* signifies that driver lead feature race for at least one lap (1 point given). Note: All bonus leading points may not be added due to them being added after seeing Season Review footage and some race reports.

Note: No points were awarded for leading in the feature race at Knockhill.

=== Autosport Cup for Independents ===
- Points were only awarded to the top three class finishers in each race.

Pos.	Driver	THR		SIL		DON		BRH		OUL		DON		CRO		SNE		THR		KNO		BRH		OUL		SIL		Pts
1	(Norway) Tommy Rustad	**16**	Ret	15	13	17	12	12	14	13	12	12	**8**	15	Ret	17	12	14	Ret	13	8	**15**	13	12	8			251
2	(United Kingdom) Robb Gravett	17	16	13	12	15	Ret	16	17	15	16	**8**	Ret	Ret	14	13	9	16	Ret	Ret	**12**	16	12	15	**12**	Ret	DNS	212
3	(United Kingdom) Matt Neal	Ret	**10**	**Ret**	**16**	**5**	**9**	**Ret**	**5**	**Ret**	**14**	Ret	6	**12**	**15**	**NC**	**13**	**12**	**Ret**	**8**	Ret	9	**5**	**13**	7	**Ret**	**Ret**	211
4	(United Kingdom) Mark Lemmer	14	Ret	Ret	14	16	Ret	17	Ret	Ret	DNS	Ret	Ret	17	17			18	13			Ret	16			15	13	95
5	(Norway) Roger Möen	18	17	16	15	Ret	15	18	16	16	15	11	10	Ret	16													92
6	(United Kingdom) Paula Cook																							16	13	16	12	27
–	(United Kingdom) Lee Brookes																							DNS	DNS			0
Pos.	Driver	THR		SIL		DON		BRH		OUL		DON		CRO		SNE		THR		KNO		BRH		OUL		SIL		Pts

=== Manufacturers Championship ===
Pos	Manufacturer	THR		SIL		DON		BRH		OUL		DON		CRO		SNE		THR		KNO		BRH		OUL		SIL		Pts
1	Nissan / Vodafone Nissan Racing	7	12	1	3	Ret	1	2	3	3	3	1	2	2	2	1	4	1	2	1	7	1	2	2	1	5	1	273
2	Volvo / Volvo S40 Racing	1	2	5	5	3	7	1	1	2	2	2	7	4	1	5	2	3	3	11	3	3	1	11	4	2	3	245
3	Renault / Blend 37 Williams Renault	2	1	3	2	4	2	3	4	1	1	9	Ret	3	4	2	3	2	1	3	4	5	3	3	2	4	6	244
4	Honda / Team Honda Sport	3	3	2	9	2	4	9	2	Ret	5	4	Ret	1	5	4	1	4	5	2	14	2	7	1	Ret	1	4	222
5	Vauxhall / Vauxhall Sport	4	5	4	6	1	3	6	9	7	6	5	1	6	8	9	Ret	7	11	9	1	8	14	9	5	7	10	162
6	Audi / Audi Sport UK	9	9	10	8	6	10	5	8	9	8	7	4	5	10	14	5	6	8	4	2	11	6	5	3	3	5	150
7	Ford / Ford Mondeo Racing	15	14	9	1	8	13	7	Ret	8	7	3	5	13	9	8	6	10	12	6	13	Ret	Ret	8	6	10	8	117
8	Peugeot / Esso Ultron Team Peugeot	13	8	11	4	9	11	8	11	12	13	10	Ret	11	18	12	10	9	9	10	6	10	8	14	10	6	14	96
Pos	Manufacturer	THR		SIL		DON		BRH		OUL		DON		CRO		SNE		THR		KNO		BRH		OUL		SIL		Pts

=== Teams Championship ===
Pos	Team	THR	SIL	DON	BRH	OUL	DON	CRO	SNE	THR	KNO	BRH	OUL	SIL	Pts
1	Vodafone Nissan Racing	12	3	1	3	3	2	2	4	2	7	2	1	1	168
1	Vodafone Nissan Racing	13	Ret	6	6	Ret	Ret	3	NC	6	9	Ret	Ret	2	168
2	Blend 37 Williams Renault	1	2	2	4	1	Ret	4	3	1	4	3	2	6	159
2	Blend 37 Williams Renault	4	Ret	5	Ret	4	Ret	6	Ret	Ret	5	4	Ret	Ret	159
3	Volvo S40 Racing	2	5	7	1	2	7	1	2	3	3	1	4	3	140
3	Volvo S40 Racing	11	Ret	Ret	10	9	Ret	7	11	4	Ret	Ret	9	Ret	140
4	Team Honda Sport	3	9	4	2	5	Ret	5	1	5	14	7	Ret	4	95
4	Team Honda Sport	7	11	Ret	7	Ret	Ret	Ret	Ret	7	Ret	9	Ret	7	95
5	Vauxhall Sport	5	6	3	9	6	1	8	Ret	11	1	14	5	10	75
5	Vauxhall Sport	6	7	8	13	Ret	3	12	Ret	Ret	Ret	Ret	11	Ret	75
6	Audi Sport UK	9	8	10	8	8	4	10	5	8	2	6	3	5	59
6	Audi Sport UK	Ret	17	14	15	10	9	11	7	10	10	11	Ret	Ret	59
7	Ford Mondeo Racing	14	1	13	Ret	7	5	9	6	12	13	Ret	6	8	44
7	Ford Mondeo Racing	15	10	16	Ret	11	Ret	13	8	DNS	Ret	Ret		11	44
8	Team Dynamics Max Power	10	16	9	5	14	6	15	13	Ret	Ret	5	7	Ret	24
9	Esso Ultron Team Peugeot	8	4	11	11	13	Ret	18	10	9	6	8	10	14	19
9	Esso Ultron Team Peugeot	Ret	18	Ret	12	Ret	Ret	Ret	Ret	Ret	11	10	Ret	Ret	19
10	DC Cook Motorsport	Ret	13	12	14	12	8	Ret	12	Ret	8	13	8	12	9
10	DC Cook Motorsport												13		9
11	Brookes Motorsport	16	12	Ret	17	16	Ret	14	9	Ret	12	12	12	DNS	2
11	Brookes Motorsport												DNS		2
12	Mardi Gras Motorsport	17	15	15	16	15	10	16		13		16		13	1
13	Mint Motorsport	Ret	14	Ret	Ret	DNS	Ret	17							0
Pos	Team	THR	SIL	DON	BRH	OUL	DON	CRO	SNE	THR	KNO	BRH	OUL	SIL	Pts

Colour	Result
Gold	Winner
Silver	Second place
Bronze	Third place
Green	Points classification
Blue	Non-points classification
Blue	Non-classified finish (NC)
Purple	Retired, not classified (Ret)
Red	Did not qualify (DNQ)
Red	Did not pre-qualify (DNPQ)
Black	Disqualified (DSQ)
White	Did not start (DNS)
White	Withdrew (WD)
White	Race cancelled (C)
Blank	Did not practice (DNP)
Blank	Did not arrive (DNA)
Blank	Excluded (EX)

**Bold** – Pole
Italics – Fastest Lap
