= Roger Moen =

Norwegian racing driver (born 1966)

- Nationality: (Norway) Norwegian
- Born: 11 April 1966 (age 60) Fetsund, Norway

British Touring Car Championship
- Years active: 1998, 2001
- Teams: Mardi Gras Motorsport, HTML
- Starts: 40
- Wins: 1 (6 in class)
- Poles: 0 (6 in class)
- Fastest laps: 0 (3 in class)
- Best finish: 21st in 1998

Championship titles
- 1996: National Saloon Car Championship - Class B

Roger Moen (born 11 April 1966, in Fetsund) is a Norwegian former racing driver. He is best known for his two different spells racing in the British Touring Car Championship. He first raced in British Saloons, winning his class in the National Saloon 2000 championship with seven wins in 1996, and finished as runner-up in 1997.

In 1998, Moen drove in the BTCC for the Michelin Cup for Independents, in a Honda Accord for Mardi Gras Motorsport. He drove in the first fourteen of the twenty-six rounds, finishing fifth in the independents cup and twenty-first overall with one championship point. He returned to the BTCC in 2001, racing a full season in the production class for HTML in a Peugeot 306, ending the year third in class. In 2003, he competed in the Swedish Touring Car Championship.

== Racing record ==
=== Complete 24 Hours of Spa results ===
Year	Team	Co-Drivers	Car	Class	Laps	Pos.	Class Pos.
1996	(United Kingdom) Honda Challenge	(United Kingdom) Bill Stillwell (Belgium) Xavier Desaeger	Honda Civic V-Tec	Spa 1.6	426	23rd	2nd

=== Complete British Touring Car Championship results ===
(key) Races in bold indicate pole position (1 point awarded all races, 2001 in class) Races in italics indicate fastest lap (1 point awarded - 2001 only in class) * signifies that driver lead feature race for at least one lap (1 point awarded - 2001 only in class)

Year	Team	Car	Class	1	2	3	4	5	6	7	8	9	10	11	12	13	14	15	16	17	18	19	20	21	22	23	24	25	26	DC	Pts	Class
1998	Mardi Gras Motorsport	Honda Accord		THR; 1; 18	THR; 2; 17	SIL; 1; 16	SIL; 2; 15	DON; 1 Ret	DON; 2; 15	BRH; 1; 18	BRH; 2; 16	OUL; 1; 16	OUL; 2; 15	DON; 1; 11	DON; 2; 10	CRO; 1 Ret	CRO; 2; 16	SNE; 1	SNE; 2	THR; 1	THR; 2	KNO; 1	KNO; 2	BRH; 1	BRH; 2	OUL; 1	OUL; 2	SIL; 1	SIL; 2	21st	1	
2001	HTML	Peugeot 306 GTi	P	BRH; 1; 2†	BRH; 2 ovr:8* cls:2	THR; 1 Ret	THR; 2 Ret*	OUL; 1 ovr:3 cls:3	OUL; 2 Ret	SIL; 1 ovr:2 cls:2	SIL; 2 ovr:8* cls:1	MON; 1 ovr:6 cls:3	MON; 2 ovr:11 cls:7	DON; 1 ovr:8 cls:1	DON; 2 ovr:7* cls:2	KNO; 1 Ret	KNO; 2 ovr:10 cls:6	SNE; 1 ovr:17 cls:13	SNE; 2 ovr:14 cls:8	**CRO**; **1** ovr:1 cls:1	**CRO**; **2** Ret	**OUL**; **1** ovr:5 cls:1	**OUL**; **2** ovr:7* cls:1	**SIL**; **1** ovr:5 cls:1	**SIL**; **2** Ret	DON; 1 ovr:2 cls:2	DON; 2 ovr:6* cls:1	BRH; 1 ovr:12 cls:4	BRH; 2 NC	N/A	212	3rd

† Event with 2 races staged for the different classes.
