= Park Lane Racing =

Park Lane Racing was a British auto racing team, formed in 1991 by racing driver and principal of the Park Lane Leasing vehicle company, Roland Dane, in partnership with Formula One driver Derek Warwick.

The team initially ran a pair of Honda Civic V-Tec cars in the British Group N Championship for Dane along with James Kaye. For 1992, they competed in the British Touring Car Championship with a single Toyota Carina for Kaye. A successful season saw Kaye win the TOCA Challenge Cup for independents and finish tenth in the overall championship. A year later the team ran as the official Toyota junior team and entered a second car for Bobby Verdon-Roe.

Dane and Warwick went on to form the Triple 8 Race Engineering team in 1996.
