= Simon Harrison =

British racing driver (born 1969)

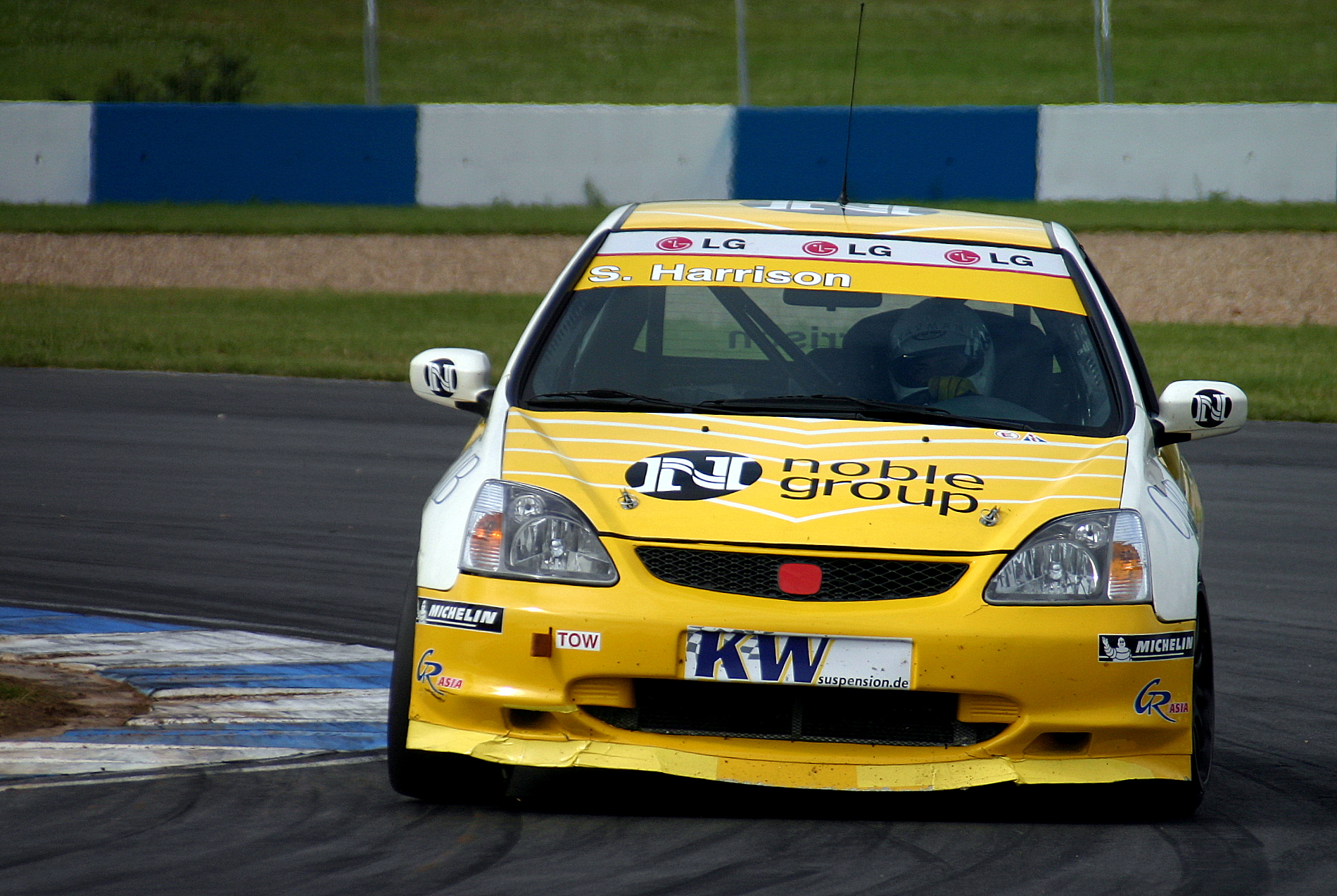
- Harrison competing at Donington Park during the 2004 European Touring Car Championship season
- Nationality: (United Kingdom) British
- Born: Simon Mark Harrison; 6 September 1969 (age 57) Northampton, Northamptonshire, England

British Touring Car Championship
- Years active: 1995, 2000–2001
- Teams: Peugeot; GR Motorsport; HTML
- Starts: 51
- Wins: 3 (1 in class)
- Poles: 1 (12 in class)
- Fastest laps: 1 (6 in class)
- Best finish: 22nd in 1995

Championship titles
- 1994, 1999 2001: National Saloon Car Championship; BTCC - Production Class

Simon Mark Harrison (born 6 September 1969 in Northampton) is a British racing driver. He won two National Saloon Car Championships in 1994 and 1999, as well as the Production Class of the British Touring Car Championship in 2001.

Harrison's 23 year racing career started with winning his local karting championship at his first attempt.

Harrison is best known for his time as a Peugeot factory driver in the 1995 British Touring Car Championship driving a 405 Mi16. This was after first season in saloon cars, winning the National Saloon Car Championship as part of the Team Castrol Honda scholarship squad. Prior to this, Harrison successfully raced in single seaters and was nominated for the McLaren Autosport Young Driver of the Year Award.

== Karting career ==
- 1982 Regional karting champion.
- 1985 Winner of karting's Golden Steering Wheel Award.
- 1986 Sixth in the Junior British Championships.

== Single seater career ==
- 1987 Winner of the Jim Russell Racing Driver's School 30th Anniversary Scholarship.
- 1988 Winner the First Time Racing Driver's Scholarship.
- 1989 Formula First Championship, third place.
- 1990 Formula Ford Championship, fifth place.
- 1991 Formula Ford Championship, third place.
- 1993 Formula Vauxhall Junior Championship, third place.

Unable to secure financial backing to move into Formula 3 racing, Harrison instead tried out for the Team Castol Honda scholarship, a manufacturer-backed program to recruit racing talent. Harrison secured a place in the three-car team, won the first round of the championship and subsequently led the championship from start to finish.

== Saloon car career ==
- 1994 National Saloon Car Championship with Team Castrol Honda. Championship win, six race wins, eight pole positions, four lap records.
- 1995 British Touring Car Championship for Total Team Peugeot
- 1996 Touring car test and reserve driver for Honda Europe.
- 1998 Spa 24 Hours for Honda.
- 1999 National Saloon Car Championship driving a Honda Integra Type-R for GR Motorsport. Championship win, five race wins, six pole positions, four lap records.
- 2000 National Saloon Car Championship driving a Ford Focus for GR Motorsport, fourth place.
- 2001 British Touring Car Championship Production Class driving a Peugeot 306 GTi6. Championship win, 8 race wins, 8 pole positions, 3 lap records.
- 2002 Macau Grand Prix driving a Honda Integra Type-R, setting a new lap record.
- 2004 European Touring Car Championship driving a Honda Civic Type-R for GR Motorsport.
- 2005 World Touring Car Championship driving a Honda Accord Euro R for JAS Motorsport. Raced in last round at Macau.

== Personal life ==
At the end of the 2005 season, Harrison retired from racing to concentrate on motor sport filming. He is now the Managing Director of Kingdom Creative, a specialist motor manufacturer and motor sport filming company.

== Racing record ==
=== Complete 24 Hours of Spa results ===
Year	Team	Co-Drivers	Car	Class	Laps	Pos.	Class Pos.
1998	Team Honda Sport Belgium	(United Kingdom) James Kaye (United Kingdom) Stephen Day	Honda Integra Type R	SP	470	8th	8th

=== Complete British Touring Car Championship results ===
(key) Races in bold indicate pole position (1 point awarded – 1996–2002 all races, 2003–present just in first race, 1987–1989 and 2000–2003 in class) Races in italics indicate fastest lap (1 point awarded – 1987–1989 and 2000–present all races, 1987–1989 and 2000–2003 in class) * signifies that driver lead race for at least one lap (1 point awarded – 2001 just in feature races, 2003–present all races, 2001 for leading in class)

Year	Team	Car	Class	1	2	3	4	5	6	7	8	9	10	11	12	13	14	15	16	17	18	19	20	21	22	23	24	25	26	Overall DC	Pts	Class
1995	Total Team Peugeot	Peugeot 405 Mi16		DON; 1; 14	DON; 2; 17	BRH; 1; 15	BRH; 2; 11	THR; 1; 10	THR; 2; 9	SIL; 1; 12	SIL; 2; 16	OUL; 1; 7	OUL; 2; 12	BRH; 1; 11	BRH; 2; 13	DON; 1 Ret	DON; 1 Ret	SIL; 15	KNO; 1 Ret	KNO; 2 Ret	BRH; 1 Ret	BRH; 2 DNS	SNE; 1; 19	SNE; 2; 11	OUL; 1; 9	OUL; 2 Ret	SIL; 1 Ret	SIL; 2 DNS		22nd	9	
2000	GR Motorsport	Ford Focus	B	BRH; 1	BRH; 2	DON; 1	DON; 2	THR; 1	THR; 2	KNO; 1	KNO; 2	OUL; 1	OUL; 2	SIL; 1	SIL; 2	CRO; 1	CRO; 2	SNE; 1	SNE; 2	DON; 1	DON; 2	BRH; 1	BRH; 2	OUL; 1 Ret	OUL; 2 Ret	SIL; 1	SIL; 2			N/A	0	NC
2001	HTML	Peugeot 306 GTi	P	**BHI**; **1**; 1†	**BHI**; **2** Ret*	**THR**; **1** ovr:5 cls:1	**THR**; **2** Ret	**OUL**; **1** ovr:1 cls:1	**OUL**; **2** ovr:7 cls:3	**SIL**; **1** ovr:1 cls:1	**SIL**; **2** ovr:10* cls:3	MON; 1 ovr:9 cls:5	MON; 2 ovr:8 cls:4	**DON**; **1** ovr:17 cls:10	DON; 2 Ret	KNO; 1 ovr:5 cls:3	KNO; 2 ovr:7 cls:3	**SNE**; **1** ovr:8 cls:5	**SNE**; **2** ovr:10 cls:4	CRO; 1 ovr:18 cls:12	CRO; 2 ovr:12 cls:7	OUL; 1 ovr:6 cls:2	OUL; 2 ovr:8* cls:2	SIL; 1 ovr:6 cls:2	SIL; 2 ovr:10 cls:2	**DON**; **1** Ret	**DON**; **2** ovr:7* cls:2	BRH; 1 ovr:16 cls:8	BRH; 2 ovr:10 cls:6	N/A	227	1st

† Event with 2 races staged for the different classes.

=== Complete World Touring Car Championship results ===
(key) (Races in bold indicate pole position) (Races in italics indicate fastest lap)

Year	Team	Car	1	2	3	4	5	6	7	8	9	10	11	12	13	14	15	16	17	18	19	20	DC	Pts
2005	JAS Motorsport	Honda Accord Euro R	ITA; 1	ITA; 2	FRA; 1	FRA; 2	GBR; 1	GBR; 2	SMR; 1	SMR; 2	MEX; 1	MEX; 2	BEL; 1	BEL; 2	GER; 1	GER; 2	TUR; 1	TUR; 2	ESP; 1	ESP; 2	MAC; 1; 20†	MAC; 2 DNS	-	**0**
