= Simon Graves =

British racing driver (born 1967)

- Nationality: (United Kingdom) British
- Born: 23 November 1967 (age 58)

British Touring Car Championship
- Years active: 2001
- Teams: Team Kaliber Sport with Barwell
- Starts: 18
- Wins: 3 (1 in class)
- Poles: 0 (2 in class)
- Fastest laps: 0 (4 in class)
- Best finish: 7th (Production Class) in 2001

Simon Graves (born 23 November 1967) is a British former racing driver who competed in series including the British Touring Car Championship.

== Early life ==
Graves came from Shepperton.

== Career ==
In 2001, Graves took outright sprint race victories at Knockhill, Snetterton and Donington Park and finished in seventh overall in the Production Class championship.

== Racing record ==
=== Complete British Touring Car Championship results ===
(key) Races in bold indicate pole position in class (1 point awarded all races) Races in italics indicate fastest lap in class (1 point awarded all races) * signifies that driver lead race for at least one lap in class (1 point awarded just in feature race)

Year	Team	Car	Class	1	2	3	4	5	6	7	8	9	10	11	12	13	14	15	16	17	18	19	20	21	22	23	24	25	26	DC	Pts	Class
2001	Team Kaliber Sport with Barwell	Honda Accord	P	BRH; 1	BRH; 2	THR; 1	THR; 2	OUL; 1	OUL; 2	SIL; 1 ovr:14 cls:8	SIL; 2 Ret	**MON**; **1** Ret	**MON**; **2** Ret	DON; 1 Ret	DON; 2 ovr:8 cls:3	KNO; 1 ovr:1 cls:1	KNO; 2 Ret	SNE; 1 ovr:1 cls:1	SNE; 2 ovr:8 cls:2	CRO; 1 ovr:9 cls:5	CRO; 2 ovr:11 cls:6	OUL; 1	OUL; 2	SIL; 1 Ret	SIL; 2 Ret	DON; 1 ovr:1 cls:1	DON; 2 Ret	BRH; 1 ovr:2 cls:1	BRH; 2 ovr:8 cls:4	N/A	111	7th
