= James Kaye =

British racing driver (born 1964)

- Nationality: British
- Born: James Peter Kaye; 18 February 1964 (age 62) Harrogate, England
- Relatives: Richard Kaye (brother)

British Touring Car Championship career
- Debut season: 1986
- Current team: AmD Tuning.com
- Categorisation: FIA Silver (until 2019); FIA Bronze (2020–)
- Car number: 15
- Former teams: WRC Developments with Barwell; Synchro Motorsport; Honda Team MSD; Maxted Motorsport; Park Lane Toyota Junior Team; Demon Tweeks; Containerships
- Starts: 296
- Wins: 0
- Poles: 0
- Fastest laps: 0
- Best finish: 1st in 2002 (Production class)

Previous series
- 2018 2010 2007 2005 2002 1998–2000 1998–2000 1998–2000 1997 1991, 1993 1983–86, 1988: Britcar; Belgian Touring Car Series; FIA GT3 European Championship; ETCC; Italian Super Production; National Saloon Cup GB; Belgian Procar; Spa 24h FIA GT Championship; JTCC; UPSCC

Championship titles
- 2023–24 2023–24 1992, 1994 1985: Middle East Trophy - TCE; Middle East Trophy - TCR; BTCC Independents' Cup; UPSCC

James Peter Kaye (born 18 February 1964 in Harrogate, North Yorkshire) is a British car racing driver. He has been a stalwart competitor of Hondas in various championships since 1995, and has had 2 lengthy spells in the British Touring Car Championship (BTCC). He won the BTCC independents' championship in 1992 and 1994.

== Racing career ==
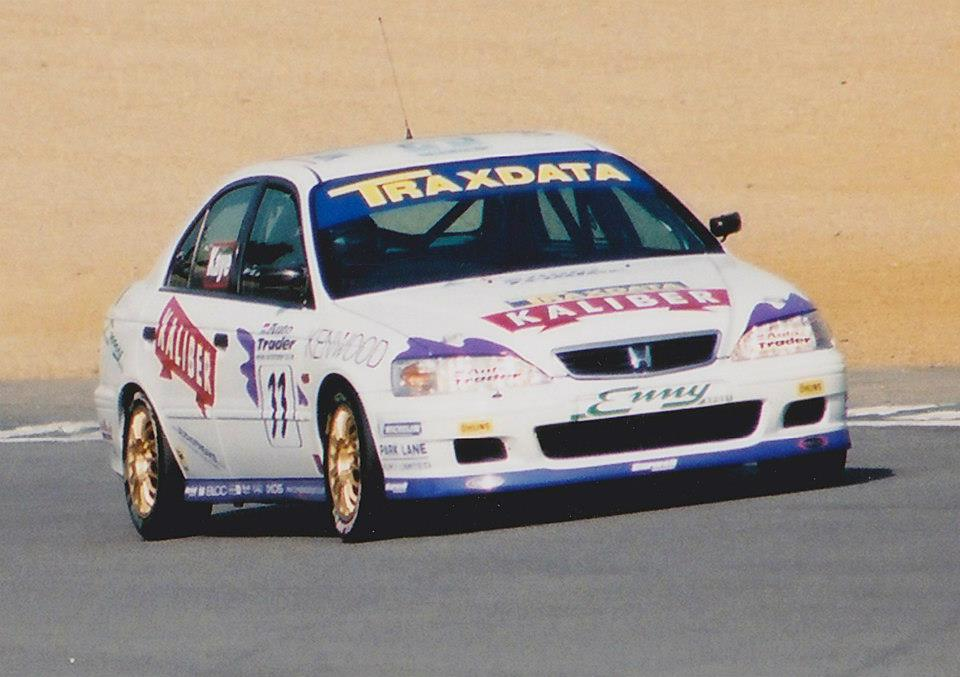
Kaye driving the Barwell Motorsport Honda Accord at Brands Hatch during the 2000 British Touring Car Championship season.

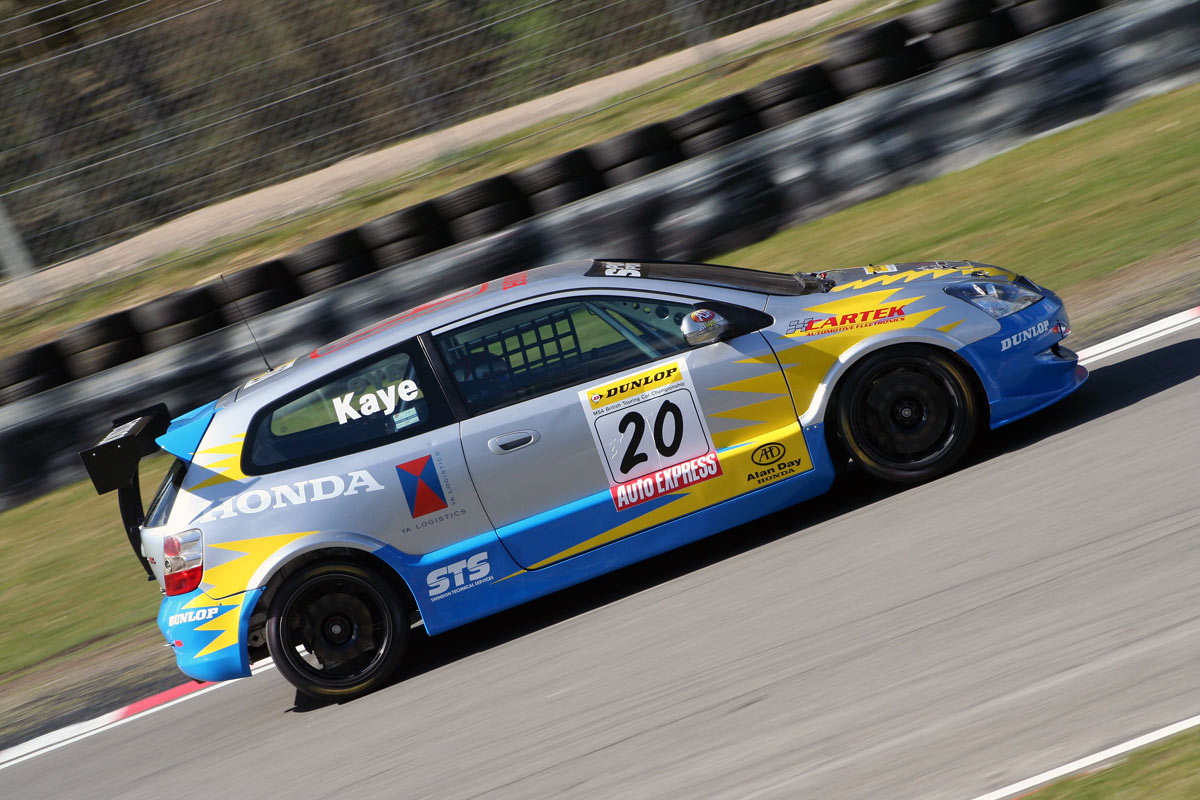
Kaye driving for Synchro Motorsport at the Brands Hatch round of the 2006 British Touring Car Championship season.

After racing in the British National Production Saloon Championship with several championship in the late 80s and early 90s, Kaye entered the BTCC as an independent in 1992, winning the independent title in his Toyota, and again in 1994. In 1993, he raced a semi-works Toyota for the Park Lane Racing team, ineligible for the Total Cup for Independents. In 1995, he was hired by Honda for their BTCC programme, racing there for 2 seasons.

Kaye had an assortment of sports car drives for Honda from 1997–1999, returning to touring cars in the National Saloon Championship in 2000. The same cars were eligible for the newly created Class B of the BTCC that year, and Kaye was runner up in a Honda Accord. This was renamed the Production Class for 2001, and Kaye again finished second, before winning the Production Class title in 2002 for Synchro Motorsport, a team of Honda employees working in their spare time at the Honda factory in Swindon.

The team moved up to the Touring class of the BTCC for 2003, defined as an Independent team as they had no financial or technical backing, James classified as Independent runner-up and 14th overall. Remaining with Synchro, Kaye was 11th overall in 2004 and 2005. He took his first series podium at Oulton Park in 2006 after 14 years of trying. For 2007, the team pulled out, leaving Kaye without a drive.

Kaye returned to the BTCC for the 2013 season, driving the AmD Tuning.com Volkswagen Golf in the Jack Sears Trophy.

For the final round of the 2018 Dunlop Endurance Championship, Kaye raced with Matt Le Breton in an Audi RS3 TCR, finishing 11th in race one and 4th in race two.

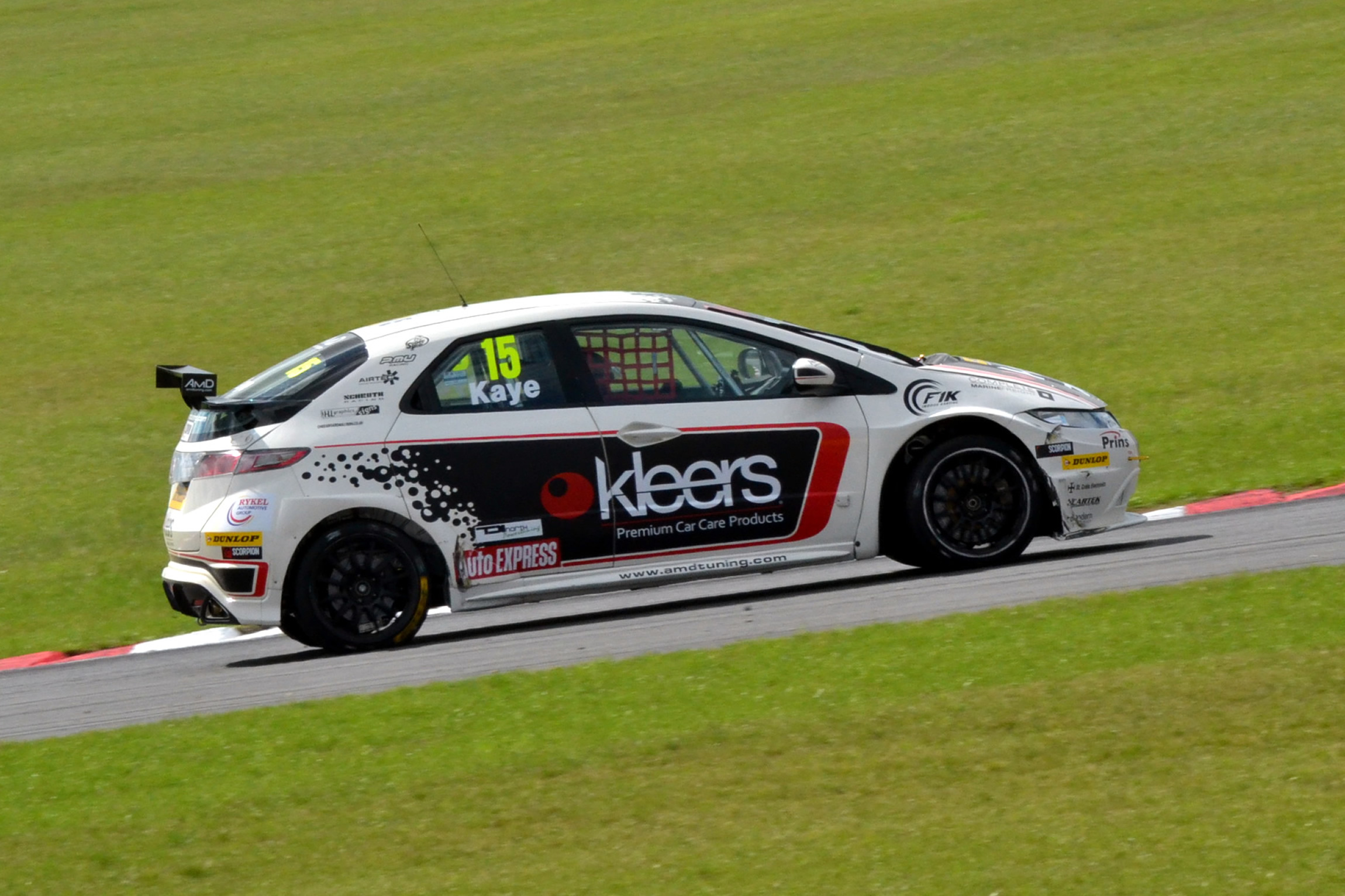
Kaye driving the AmD Tuning Honda Civic at Snetterton during the 2013 British Touring Car Championship season.

In 2023, Kaye returned to racing in the final meeting of the inaugural Racing Hondas Championship at Snetterton. Driving a Honda Civic of the same model he had driven in the BTCC from 2002 to 2006 in Class C, he won his class in Race 1 and came third in Race 2. This placed him equal 4th overall in the championship in his class.

== Career highlights ==
- 2006 BTCC with Synchro Racing, once again back in the Civic Type R. Scored in four of the first six races, and then at Oulton Park qualified a fine fourth and converted it into his first BTCC podium finish.
- 2005 BTCC with Synchro Racing, Honda Civic Type R. Quietly began racking up points finishes but constantly in the wars. His best finish was at the Indy round at Brands Hatch, where he was 4th in race three. He even resorted to changing his race number (from 10 to 31) in the final round to see if it would bring a change of luck. Perhaps it worked: he finished all three races in the points, making a season total of 58, 11th in the championship.
- 2004 BTCC with Synchro with the Civic again. A quiet year by James' high standards, but 3rd in qualifying and 4th in the first race at Brands Hatch was a high point. Ended up 11th in the championship with 49 points, 5th in the Independents.
- 2003 BTCC with Team Synchro, Honda Civic Type R. His season seemed to lack consistency but still led to 2nd in the Independents' cup.
- 2002 BTCC Production Class – Honda – Champion; Macau Grand Prix – 6th in second heat
- 2001 BTCC Production Class – Honda – 2nd; Spa 24 Hours; Macau Grand Prix – 4th
- 2000 BTCC Production Class – Honda – 2nd
- 1999 Belgian Procar Championship
- 1997 FIA World GT Championship
- 1996 BTCC – Honda – 12th
- 1995 BTCC – Honda – 18th
- 1994 BTCC Independents' Cup – Toyota – Champion; Australian Touring Cars
- 1993 BTCC – Toyota Junior Team – 20th; Japanese Group A Touring Cars
- 1992 BTCC Independents' Cup – Toyota – Champion
- 1991 British National Group N Championship – Honda Civic Vtec
- 1990 Honda CRX Championship
- 1989 Ford Fiesta Championship – Champion; Renault 5 Turbo Championship; Honda CRX Championship; Uniroyal Production Saloon Car Championship
- 1988 Uniroyal Production Saloon Car Championship – Class Champion; Renault 5 Turbo Championship; Honda CRX Championship
- 1987 Renault 5 Turbo Championship – 2nd
- 1986 Uniroyal Production Saloon Car Championship – Class Champion
- 1985 Uniroyal Production Saloon Car Championship – Champion
- 1984 Uniroyal Production Saloon Car Championship – Class Champion
- 1983 Uniroyal Production Saloon Car Championship

== Personal life ==
Kaye's father Peter Kaye was a Hillclimb/Sprint driver, which was a great influence on James growing up. James is the oldest of 5 children, and his younger brother Richard Kaye, has also raced professionally. James is married and has five children.

== Racing record ==
=== Complete British Saloon / Touring Car Championship results ===
(key) Races in bold indicate pole position (1 point awarded – 1996–2002 all races, 2003–present just in first race, 1987–1989 and 2000–2003 in class) Races in italics indicate fastest lap (1 point awarded – 1987–1989 and 2000–present all races, 1987–1989 and 2000–2003 in class) * signifies that driver lead race for at least one lap (1 point awarded – 2001 just in feature races, 2003–present all races, 2001 for leading in class)

Year	Team	Car	Class	1	2	3	4	5	6	7	8	9	10	11	12	13	14	15	16	17	18	19	20	21	22	23	24	25	26	27	28	29	30	Overall DC	Pts	Class
1986	Containerships	Vauxhall Nova Sport	D	SIL	THR	SIL	DON	**BRH** ovr:17 cls:1	SNE	BRH	DON	SIL																						15th	10	**2nd**
1988	Demon Tweeks	Volkswagen Golf GTI	C	SIL ovr:15‡ cls:1‡	OUL; Ret	THR	DON	THR	SIL	SIL	BRH	SNE	BRH	BIR	DON	SIL																		58th	1	8th
1989	Demon Tweeks	BMW M3	B	OUL ovr:17 cls:5	SIL	THR	DON	THR	SIL	SIL	BRH	SNE	BRH	BIR	DON	SIL																		51st	2	12th
1992	Park Lane Racing	Toyota Carina		SIL; Ret	THR; Ret	OUL; 13	SNE; Ret	BRH; 13	DON; 1; 14	DON; 2 Ret	SIL; 5	KNO; 1; 12	KNO; 2; 9	PEM; 14	BRH; 1 Ret	BRH; 2; 12	DON; 5	SIL; 8																10th	19	
1993	Park Lane Toyota Junior Team	Toyota Carina E		SIL; 13	DON; 11	SNE; 9	DON; Ret	OUL; Ret	BRH; 1 Ret	BRH; 2 DNS	PEM; Ret	SIL; 10	KNO; 1 DNS	KNO; 2 DNS	OUL; 12	BRH	THR; 20	DON; 1; 14	DON; 2 Ret	SIL; 14														21st	3	
1994	Maxted Motorsport	Toyota Carina E		THR; 16	BRH; 1; 17	BRH; 2; 19	SNE; 13	SIL; 1; 18	SIL; 2; 15	OUL; Ret	DON; 1; 18	DON; 2; 16	BRH; 1; 15	BRH; 2; 21	SIL; 15	KNO; 1; 12	KNO; 2; 18	OUL; Ret	BRH; 1; 18	BRH; 2 Ret	SIL; 1; 20	SIL; 2; 13	DON; 1; 17	DON; 2; 17										29th	0	
1995	Honda Team MSD	Honda Accord		DON; 1; 11	DON; 2; 10	BRH; 1; 19	BRH; 2; 14	THR; 1; 16	THR; 2; 13	SIL; 1; 10	SIL; 2; 13	OUL; 1; 14	OUL; 2; 10	BRH; 1; 13	BRH; 2; 19	DON; 1; 14	DON; 2; 10	SIL; Ret	KNO; 1 Ret	KNO; 2; 5	BRH; 1; 10	BRH; 2; 8	SNE; 1; 18	SNE; 2; 9	OUL; 1; 7	OUL; 2; 9	SIL; 1; 16	SIL; 2; 9						18th	25	
1996	Honda Team MSD	Honda Accord		DON; 1; 9	DON; 2; 10	BRH; 1; 9	BRH; 2; 11	THR; 1 Ret	THR; 2; 9	SIL; 1; 9	SIL; 2; 8	OUL; 1; 13	OUL; 2 Ret	SNE; 1 Ret	SNE; 2; 7	BRH; 1 Ret	BRH; 2; 14	SIL; 1 Ret	SIL; 2; 11	KNO; 1; 8	KNO; 2; 8	OUL; 1; 10	OUL; 2; 10	THR; 1; 8	THR; 2; 9	DON; 1 Ret	DON; 2; 10	BRH; 1 DNS	BRH; 2; 8					12th	33	
2000	Barwell Motorsport	Honda Accord	B	BRH; 1 ovr:13 cls:2	BRH; 2 ovr:9 cls:1	DON; 1 ovr:11 cls:2	DON; 2 ovr:11 cls:1	THR; 1 ovr:13 cls:3	THR; 2 Ret			**OUL**; **1** ovr:10 cls:1	**OUL**; **2** ovr:10 cls:1	SIL; 1 ovr:11 cls:2	SIL; 2 ovr:8 cls:2	CRO; 1 Ret	CRO; 2 ovr:6 cls:1	SNE; 1 ovr:8 cls:2	SNE; 2 ovr:10 cls:2	**DON**; **1** ovr:12 cls:2	**DON**; **2** ovr:11 cls:1	BRH; 1 Ret	**BRH**; **2** ovr:11 cls:1	OUL; 1 ovr:12 cls:3	OUL; 2 ovr:9 cls:1	**SIL**; **1** ovr:10 cls:2	SIL; 2 ovr:10 cls:2							N/A	**260**	**2nd**
2000	Barwell Motorsport	Honda Integra Type-R	B							KNO; 1 ovr:12 cls:2	KNO; 2 ovr:11 cls:3																							N/A	**260**	**2nd**
2001	Team Kaliber Sport with Barwell	Honda Accord	P	BRH; 1 Ret†	BRH; 2 ovr:7* cls:1	THR; 1 ovr:7 cls:3	THR; 2 ovr:5* cls:1	OUL; 1 ovr:2 cls:2	OUL; 2 Ret	SIL; 1 ovr:9 cls:5	SIL; 2 ovr:9* cls:2	MON; 1 ovr:2 cls:1	MON; 2 ovr:5* cls:1	DON; 1 ovr:12 cls:5	DON; 2 Ret	KNO; 1 ovr:6 cls:4	KNO; 2 ovr:6 cls:2	SNE; 1 ovr:9 cls:6	SNE; 2 Ret	CRO; 1 ovr:6 cls:3	CRO; 2 ovr:10 cls:5	OUL; 1 ovr:13 cls:6	OUL; 2 ovr:10 cls:4	SIL; 1 Ret	SIL; 2 ovr:9* cls:1	DON; 1 ovr:3 cls:3	DON; 2 ovr:14 cls:8	BRH; 1 ovr:10 cls:2	BRH; 2 ovr:7 cls:3					N/A	**220**	**2nd**
2002	Synchro Motorsport	Honda Civic Type-R	P	BRH; 1 Ret	BRH; 2 NC	**OUL**; **1** ovr:12 cls:1	**OUL**; **2** Ret	**THR**; **1** ovr:15 cls:1	**THR**; **2** ovr:12 cls:1	**SIL**; **1** ovr:16 cls:3	**SIL**; **2** ovr:15 cls:2	MON; 1 ovr:13 cls:3	MON; 2 Ret	**CRO**; **1** ovr:11 cls:2	**CRO**; **2** ovr:14 cls:2	SNE; 1 ovr:17 cls:3	SNE; 2 ovr:11 cls:1	KNO; 1 ovr:16 cls:4	KNO; 2 ovr:17 cls:4	**BRH**; **1** ovr:14 cls:2	BRH; 2 ovr:13 cls:2	DON; 1 ovr:16 cls:3	**DON**; **2** ovr:11 cls:2											N/A	**210**	**1st**
2003	Synchro Motorsport	Honda Civic Type-R	T	MON; 1 Ret	MON; 2 Ret	BRH; 1 ovr:12 cls:12	BRH; 2 ovr:9 cls:9	THR; 1 ovr:11 cls:11	THR; 2 ovr:7 cls:7	SIL; 1 ovr:8 cls:8	SIL; 2 Ret	ROC; 1 Ret	ROC; 2 DNS	CRO; 1 ovr:13 cls:13	CRO; 2 ovr:11 cls:11	SNE; 1 ovr:7* cls:7	SNE; 2 ovr:11 cls:11	BRH; 1 ovr:11 cls:11	BRH; 2 Ret	DON; 1 ovr:10 cls:10	DON; 2 ovr:11 cls:11	OUL; 1 ovr:10 cls:10	OUL; 2 ovr:12 cls:12											14th	16	
2004	Synchro Motorsport	Honda Civic Type-R		THR; 1; 13	THR; 2; 9	THR; 3; 7	BRH; 1; 12	BRH; 2; 7	BRH; 3 Ret	SIL; 1; 13	SIL; 2; 15	SIL; 3; 9	OUL; 1; 6	OUL; 2; 12	OUL; 3; 9	MON; 1; 15	MON; 2; 7	MON; 3 Ret	CRO; 1 Ret	CRO; 2; 12	CRO; 3; 13	KNO; 1; 13	KNO; 2; 9	KNO; 3; 11	BRH; 1; 4	BRH; 2; 6	BRH; 3 Ret	SNE; 1; 9	SNE; 2; 6	SNE; 3; 13	DON; 1; 11	DON; 2; 9	DON; 3; 9	11th	49	
2005	Synchro Motorsport	Honda Civic Type-R		DON; 1 Ret	DON; 2 Ret	DON; 3 Ret	THR; 1 Ret	THR; 2; 9	THR; 3; 7	BRH; 1; 8	BRH; 2 Ret	BRH; 3; 4	OUL; 1; 11	OUL; 2 DNS	OUL; 3 Ret	CRO; 1; 9	CRO; 2; 5	CRO; 3 Ret	MON; 1; 8	MON; 2 Ret	MON; 3; 11	SNE; 1; 8	SNE; 2; 6	SNE; 3; 6	KNO; 1; 10	KNO; 2 Ret	KNO; 3 Ret	SIL; 1; 8	SIL; 2 Ret	SIL; 3; 10	BRH; 1; 8	BRH; 2; 6	BRH; 3; 7	11th	58	
2006	Synchro Motorsport	Honda Civic Type-R		BRH; 1; 8	BRH; 2; 9	BRH; 3 Ret	MON; 1; 10	MON; 2; 6	MON; 3 DNS	OUL; 1; 3	OUL; 2; 9	OUL; 3 DNS	THR; 1; 7	THR; 2; 7	**THR**; **3**; 4	CRO; 1; 8	CRO; 2; 7	CRO; 3; 9	DON; 1; 10	DON; 2; 7	DON; 3; 8	SNE; 1; 9	SNE; 2 Ret	SNE; 3; 8	KNO; 1 Ret	KNO; 2 Ret	KNO; 3 DNS	BRH; 1; 11	BRH; 2; 13	BRH; 3 Ret	SIL; 1 DNS	SIL; 2 DNS	SIL; 3 Ret	12th	61	
2010	WRC Developments with Barwell	Honda Integra Type-R		THR; 1	THR; 2	THR; 3	ROC; 1	ROC; 2	ROC; 3	BRH; 1	BRH; 2	BRH; 3	OUL; 1	OUL; 2	OUL; 3	CRO; 1	CRO; 2	CRO; 3	SNE; 1	SNE; 2	SNE; 3	SIL; 1	SIL; 2	SIL; 3	KNO; 1	KNO; 2	KNO; 3	DON; 1; 9	DON; 2; 14	DON; 3 Ret	BRH; 1; 16	BRH; 2 Ret	BRH; 3 Ret	22nd	2	
2013	AmD Tuning.com	Volkswagen Golf		BRH; 1; 15	BRH; 2; 12	BRH; 3 DNS	DON; 1; 19	DON; 2 Ret	DON; 3 Ret	THR; 1 Ret	THR; 2 Ret	THR; 3; 19	OUL; 1	OUL; 2	OUL; 3	CRO; 1 Ret	CRO; 2; 19	CRO; 3 Ret																27th	5	
2013	AmD Tuning.com	Honda Civic																	SNE; 1 Ret	SNE; 2; 19	SNE; 3 DNS	KNO; 1	KNO; 2	KNO; 3	ROC; 1	ROC; 2	ROC; 3	SIL; 1	SIL; 2	SIL; 3	BRH; 1	BRH; 2	BRH; 3	27th	5	

† Event with 2 races staged for the different classes. ‡ Kaye won in class but was awarded no points due to less than 3 class cars starting the race.

=== Complete World Touring Car Championship results ===
(key) (Races in bold indicate pole position) (Races in italics indicate fastest lap)

Year	Team	Car	1	2	3	4	5	6	7	8	9	10	11	DC	Pts
1987	(United Kingdom) **Demon Tweeks**	Volkswagen Golf GTI	MNZ	JAR	DIJ	NÜR	SPA	BNO	SIL; DNQ	BAT	CLD	WEL	FJI	NC	0

=== Complete Japanese Touring Car Championship results ===
(key) (Races in bold indicate pole position) (Races in italics indicate fastest lap)

Year	Team	Car	Class	1	2	3	4	5	6	7	8	9	DC	Pts
1991	Team Trust	Toyota Corolla Levin AE92	JTC-3	SUG	SUZ	TSU	SEN	AUT	FUJ; 7				76th	6
1993	Racing Project Bandoh	Toyota Corolla Levin AE101	JTC-3	MIN	AUT	SUG	SUZ	AID; 14	TSU	TOK	SEN	FUJ	26th	8

=== Complete Bathurst 1000 results ===
Year	Team	Co-Driver	Car	Class	Laps	Pos.	Class Pos.
1994	(Australia) Bruce Miles Racing	(New Zealand) Greg Murphy	Toyota Carina	B	136	23rd	5th
1997*	(United Kingdom) Vauxhall Sport	(United Kingdom) John Cleland	Vauxhall Vectra		32	Ret	Ret

* Super Touring race

=== Complete 24 Hours of Spa results ===
Year	Team	Co-Drivers	Car	Class	Laps	Pos.	Class Pos.
1998	Team Honda Sport Belgium	(United Kingdom) Simon Harrison (United Kingdom) Stephen Day	Honda Integra Type R	SP	470	8th	8th
1999	(United Kingdom) ELR	(Belgium) Philippe Tollenaire (Switzerland) Philippe Favre	Honda Accord	SP	518/cylinder head gasket	DNF	DNF
2000	(United Kingdom) ELR & Barwell Motorsport	(Scotland) David Leslie (United Kingdom) Mark Lemmer	Honda Accord	SP	?/engine	DNF	DNF

=== Complete 24 Hours of Silverstone results ===
Year	Team	Co-Drivers	Car	Car No.	Class	Laps	Pos.	Class Pos.
2008	(United Kingdom) Barwell Motorsport	(United Kingdom) Mark Lemmer (United Kingdom) Jay Wheals (United Kingdom) Andy Barnes (DNS)	Mitsubishi Lancer Evo X	48	3	517	25th	5th
2011	(Australia) Ryan MacLeod	(Australia) Ryan MacLeod (Australia) Ashley Walsh (United Kingdom) Jamie Capilleri (United Kingdom) Joseph Girlin	Holden Astra	70	3	518	11th	6th
2012	(Australia) Ryan MacLeod	(Australia) Ryan MacLeod (United Kingdom) Jamie Capilleri (Papua New Guinea) Keith Kassulke	Holden Astra	87	4	472	15th/DNF	9th/DNF
2015	Team Russia by Barwell	(Russia) Timur Sardarov (Russia) Leo Machitski (United Kingdom) Mark Lemmer	MARC Focus V8	92	2	327	DNF	DNF

=== Complete Britcar results ===
(key) (Races in bold indicate pole position in class – 1 point awarded just in first race; races in italics indicate fastest lap in class – 1 point awarded all races;-

Year	Team	Car	Class	1	2	3	4	5	6	7	8	9	10	11	12	13	14	DC	CP	Points
2018	WDC Racing	Audi RS3 TCR	E4I	ROC; 1	ROC; 2	SIL; 1	SIL; 2	OUL; 1	OUL; 2	DON; 1	DON; 2	SNE; 1	SNE; 2	SIL; 1	SIL; 2	BRH; 1; 11	BRH; 2; 4	NC	NC	0†

=== Complete British GT Championship results ===
(key) (Races in bold indicate pole position) (Races in italics indicate fastest lap)

Year	Team	Car	Class	1	2	3	4	5	6	7	8	9	DC	Points
2023	Simpson Motorsport	BMW M4 GT4 Gen II	GT4	OUL; 1	OUL; 2	SIL; 1 Ret	DON; 1	SNE; 1	SNE; 2	ALG; 1	BRH; 1	DON; 1	NC†	0†

^{†} As Kaye was a guest driver, he was ineligible for points.
