= Mark Lemmer =

British racing driver (born 1967)

- Nationality: (United Kingdom) British
- Born: Mark David Lemmer; 27 April 1967 (age 59) Kingston-upon-Thames, England

British Touring Car Championship
- Years active: 1998, 2000–2001
- Teams: Mint Motorsport; Mardi Gras Motorsport; Barwell Motorsport; Synchro Motorsport
- Starts: 47
- Wins: 0 (1 in class)
- Poles: 0 (2 in class)
- Fastest laps: 0 (1 in class)
- Best finish: 3rd (Class B) in 2000

Mark David Lemmer (born 27 April 1967) is a British former auto racing driver, who is also presently the managing director of the family run Barwell Motorsport racing team which was set up by his father Richard. The team have run cars in different disciplines around the world, in 2008 they entered Aston Martins in the American Le Mans Series. They plan to contest in the European Le Mans Series in 2009.

== Racing career ==
Barwell Motorsport was set up in the 1960s as Barwell Automotive Ltd by Paul Butler and Richard Lemmer. Paul Butler raced an ex-Alan Jones Brabham BT28 in F3 and Formula Atlantic in the 1970s.

Lemmer started racing in various one make series including Mazdas and Volkswagen Polos. His first title came in 1994 when he became champion of the Scottish Mutual Volkswagen Vento VR6 Challenge. After finishing third in the 1995 championship, he drove in the 1996 TVR Tuscan challenge, which included one podium finish. He finished third on points in the 1997 Vauxhall Vectra SRi V6 Challenge, with one race win.

In 1998, Lemmer raced in the British Touring Car Championship. He raced a Vauxhall Vectra in the Michelin Cup for Independents with Mint Motorsport. With three independent wins, he ended the year fourth place in his class. After a year in the National Saloon Cup, he returned to the BTCC in 2000 with a Honda Integra in the newly formed Class B. One class win for the Barwell team in round seven at Knockhill was enough to see him finish third behind teammate James Kaye. He entered just four rounds in 2001, with a Production Class Honda Accord for Synchro Motorsport.

After the BTCC, Lemmer's racing has included the Britcar Endurance series and Historic Racing events. His latest drive was in for the works Mitsubishi rally team in the 2008 Britcar 24-Hour race at Silverstone.

== Racing record ==
=== Complete British Touring Car Championship results ===
(key) Races in bold indicate pole position (1 point awarded - 2000–01 in class) Races in italics indicate fastest lap (1 point awarded - 2001 only, 2000–01 in class) * signifies that driver lead feature race for at least one lap (1 point awarded - 2001 in class)

Year	Team	Car	Class	1	2	3	4	5	6	7	8	9	10	11	12	13	14	15	16	17	18	19	20	21	22	23	24	25	26	DC	Pts	Class
1998	Mint Motorsport	Vauxhall Vectra		THR; 1; 14	THR; 2 Ret	SIL; 1 Ret	SIL; 2; 14	DON; 1; 16	DON; 2 Ret	BRH; 1; 17	BRH; 2 Ret	OUL; 1 Ret	OUL; 2 DNS	DON; 1 Ret	DON; 2 Ret	CRO; 1; 17	CRO; 2; 17													NC	0	
1998	Mardi Gras Motorsport	Vauxhall Vectra																SNE; 1	SNE; 2	THR; 1; 18	THR; 2; 13	KNO; 1	KNO; 2	BRH; 1 Ret	BRH; 2; 16	OUL; 1	OUL; 2	SIL; 1; 15	SIL; 2; 13	NC	0	
2000	Barwell Motorsport	Honda Integra Type-R	B	BRH; 1 ovr:14 cls:3	BRH; 2 ovr:10 cls:2	DON; 1 ovr:12 cls:3	DON; 2 ovr:12 cls:2	THR; 1 ovr:12 cls:2	THR; 2 DSQ	**KNO**; **1** ovr:11 cls:1	KNO; 2 ovr:10 cls:2	OUL; 1 ovr:11 cls:2	OUL; 2 ovr:12 cls:3	SIL; 1 ovr:12 cls:3	SIL; 2 ovr:9 cls:3	CRO; 1 ovr:12 cls:3	CRO; 2 ovr:10 cls:4	**SNE**; **1** ovr:9 cls:3	SNE; 2 ovr:11 cls:3	DON; 1 ovr:13 cls:3	DON; 2 ovr:13 cls:3	BRH; 1 ovr:14 cls:4	BRH; 2 ovr:13 cls:3							N/A	185	3rd
2000	Barwell Motorsport	Honda Accord	B																					OUL; 1 ovr:15 cls:6	OUL; 2 ovr:12 cls:4	SIL; 1 ovr:12 cls:4	SIL; 2 Ret			N/A	185	3rd
2001	Synchro Motorsport	Honda Accord	P	BRH; 1	BRH; 2	THR; 1	THR; 2	OUL; 1	OUL; 2	SIL; 1	SIL; 2	MON; 1	MON; 2	DON; 1	DON; 2	KNO; 1	KNO; 2	SNE; 1 ovr:10 cls:7	SNE; 2 ovr:16 cls:10	CRO; 1 ovr:11 cls:7	CRO; 2 Ret*	OUL; 1	OUL; 2	SIL; 1	SIL; 2	DON; 1	DON; 2	BRH; 1	BRH; 2	N/A	10	21st

=== Complete 24 Hours of Spa results ===
Year	Team	Co-Drivers	Car	Class	Laps	Pos.	Class Pos.
1999	(United Kingdom) Foss-Tech Racing	(United Kingdom) Tim Sugden (United Kingdom) Stephen Day	Honda Integra Type R	SP	452	12th	12th
2000	(United Kingdom) ELR & Barwell Motorsport	(United Kingdom) James Kaye (Scotland) David Leslie	Honda Accord	SP	?/engine	DNF	DNF

=== Complete 24 Hours of Silverstone results ===
Year	Team	Co-Drivers	Car	Car No.	Class	Laps	Pos.	Class Pos.
2008	(United Kingdom) Barwell Motorsport	(United Kingdom) James Kaye (United Kingdom) Jay Wheels (United Kingdom) Andy Barnes (DNS)	Mitsubishi Lancer Evo X	48	3	517	25th	5th
2008	(United Kingdom) Barwell Motorsport	(United Kingdom) Mike Brown (United Kingdom) Guy Harrington (United Kingdom) Ben de Zille Butler	Honda Integra Type R	60	4	254	DNF	DNF
2015	Team Russia by Barwell	(Russia) Timur Sardarov (Russia) Leo Machitski (United Kingdom) James Kaye	MARC Focus V8	92	2	327	DNF	DNF
