= Gareth Howell =

British racing driver (born 1981)

- Nationality: (United Kingdom) British
- Born: January 6, 1981 (age 45)
- Categorisation: FIA Silver

Previous series
- 2006: British Touring Car Championship

Gareth Howell (born 6 January 1981) is a British racing driver, and multiple British Touring Car Championship race winner from 2000 to 2008.

== Career ==
Howell drove his first kart at the age of four and began his racing career aged 8. He is a former British karting champion and European Cup winner, who finished eighth in the World Finals in 1995 from 35th on the grid setting fastest lap on the way. During his karting career, he raced alongside Jenson Button, Dan Wheldon, and his Zip Kart teammates Anthony Davidson and Gary Paffett.

At the age of ten, Howell told a TV programme that he wanted to race in the BTCC (not mentioning Formula One, which is a bigger draw for most star-struck youngsters).

At the age of 16, Howell graduated to the Fiesta si Championship and in 1998 moved up to the BTCC supporting Ford Credit Fiesta Championship. In 1998, he became the youngest race winner in the 20-year history of the Championship aged just 18. He was then runner up in the 2000 championship and winner of the Junior Cup. His prize involved a test for the works Ford Mondeo BTCC super touring team, where he recorded a faster laptime that his Fiesta peers. He made occasional appearances in the 2000 season for GR Motorsport in a Ford Focus, running in the Production class, which was known as Class B at the time. 2001 was his first full season, being part of a four-car GR Motorsport entry into the Production Class. He finished fifth overall in his class, having taken a race win in round 16 of the series at Snetterton.

In 2002, Howell graduated to the main division of the championship, driving an MG ZS for Team Atomic Kitten run by established touring car outfit West Surrey Racing joined by fellow debutant Colin Turkington.

Despite outperforming and outscoring Turkington, at the end of the season, Howell was dropped from the MG program because of funding, and found himself without a full-time drive for the 2003 season. He managed to secure a number of outings during the year, including at Silverstone as team-mate to Gavin Pyper at GA Motorsport, piloting a Vauxhall Astra Coupé. He completed the final four two-race rounds of the championship for Team Dynamics, also in a Vauxhall, scoring 2 Independent's Cup wins.

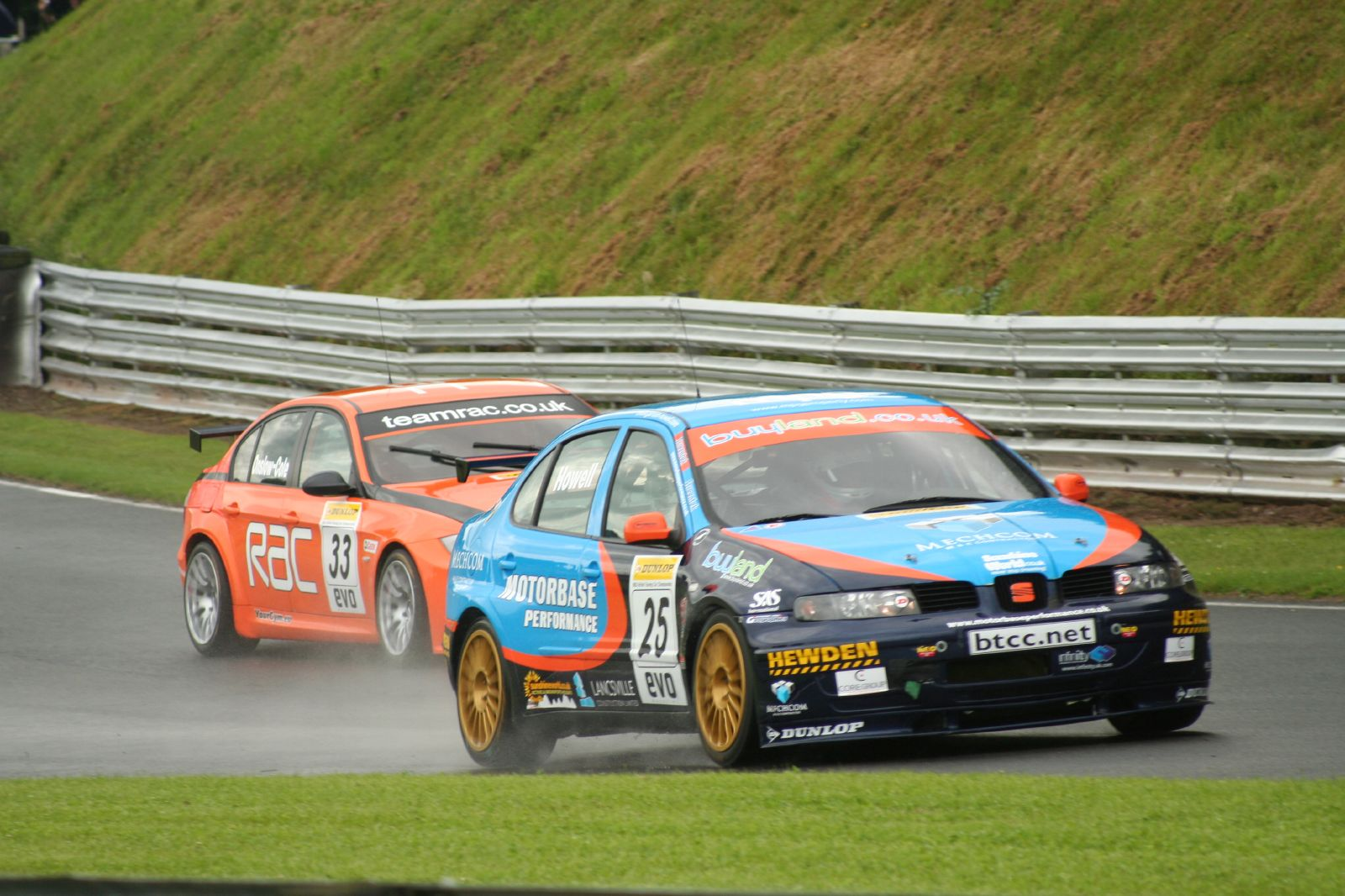
Howell driving the Motorbase Performance-run SEAT Toledo at the Oulton Park round of the 2007 British Touring Car Championship.

Howell was planned to race for Dynamics in 2004, but after Vic Lee's team closed, Dan Eaves and his Halfords sponsorship replaced him. Howell sat out the 2004 and much of the 2005 seasons due to a lack of finance. Keen to remain with the team, he held Dan's pitboard for most of 2004.

Howell finally made his series return at Knockhill for Team Dynamics towards the end of 2005. He drove the team's third Honda Integra DC05 in three race weekends alongside the team's existing drivers Matt Neal and Eaves, setting pole position and taking his debut BTCC win at Silverstone, where he also set fastest lap (and holds the lap record on the National Circuit. He had hoped to continue for Team Dynamics into 2006, but because of lack of funding, he instead only raced in the final four rounds of the season.

At the final meeting of 2006 on the Silverstone National Circuit, Howell qualified on pole, and won the first race, before battling through the field in the third race for another victory.

For 2007, Howell wanted a full-time drive. He signed to drive a SEAT Toledo for Motorbase Performance, scoring the team's best result in finishing fifth in a three-year-old car. He left the team mid-season, explaining that "It's a vicious circle. We needed to develop the car through testing to get further towards the front and out of the midfield melee, but we came back from each round with so much damage that then took all the time between races to repair. We'd then go out and experience the same problem all over again."

Howell started 2008 without a drive, but joined BTC Racing as their test and reserve driver early in the season. He races at Thruxton and Oulton Park in place of regular driver Stuart Oliver, in the same SEAT as he drove in 2007, however he scored no points and was eliminated from both meetings before the final races.

In 2008, Howell worked with Lipscomb Abarth racing an Abarth 500.

On Saturday 3 April 2008 at Oulton Park, Howell won the first ever Zing Trofeo Abarth 500 GB with a gap of 2.693 seconds.

== Other ==
Away from racing, from 2010-2020, Howell has worked as a test driver for McLaren Automotive, developing their supercar range. He now works as Chief Test Driver for Gordon Murray Automotive.

Howell is married to Laura, has a daughter called Lily, and a son called Josh.

Howell is not to be confused with the racing driver of the same name who tried and failed to enter the British Touring Car Championship in 1993 and 1999.

== Racing record ==
=== Complete British Touring Car Championship results ===
(key) Races in bold indicate pole position (1 point awarded 2000–2002 all races, 2003–present just for first race, 2000–2001 in class) Races in italics indicate fastest lap (1 point awarded – 2001–present all races, 2000–2001 in class) * signifies that driver lead race for at least one lap (1 point given 2001–2002 just for feature race, 2003–present all races, 2001 for leading in class)

Year	Team	Car	Class	1	2	3	4	5	6	7	8	9	10	11	12	13	14	15	16	17	18	19	20	21	22	23	24	25	26	27	28	29	30	Pos	Pts	Class
2000	GR Motorsport	Ford Focus	B	BRH; 1	BRH; 2	DON; 1	DON; 2	THR; 1	THR; 2	KNO; 1	KNO; 2	OUL; 1	OUL; 2	SIL; 1	SIL; 2	CRO; 1	CRO; 2	SNE; 1	SNE; 2	DON; 1	DON; 2	BRH; 1	BRH; 2	OUL; 1 ovr:13 cls:4	OUL; 2 ovr:11 cls:3	SIL; 1	SIL; 2							N/A	18	9th
2001	GR Motorsport	Ford Focus	P	BRH; 1; 3†	BRH; 2 ovr:11 cls:5	THR; 1 Ret	THR; 2 Ret	OUL; 1 ovr:4 cls:4	OUL; 2 ovr:6 cls:2	SIL; 1 Ret	SIL; 2 ovr:11 cls:4	MON; 1 ovr:5 cls:2	MON; 2 Ret	DON; 1 Ret	DON; 2 DNS	KNO; 1 Ret	KNO; 2 DNS	SNE; 1 ovr:4 cls:2	SNE; 2 ovr:7* cls:1	CRO; 1 ovr:7 cls:4	CRO; 2 ovr:8 cls:3	OUL; 1 ovr:12 cls:5	OUL; 2 ovr:11 cls:5	SIL; 1 ovr:13 cls:7	SIL; 2 Ret	DON; 1 ovr:7 cls:4	DON; 2 Ret	BRH; 1 ovr:20 cls:12	BRH; 2 ovr:6* cls:2					N/A	139	5th
2002	Team Atomic Kitten	MG ZS	T	BRH; 1	BRH; 2	OUL; 1 ovr:9 cls:9	OUL; 2 ovr:4 cls:4	THR; 1 ovr:10 cls:10	THR; 2 ovr:11 cls:11	SIL; 1 Ret	SIL; 2 ovr:8 cls:8	MON; 1 Ret	MON; 2 ovr:10 cls:10	CRO; 1 Ret	CRO; 2 ovr:9 cls:9	SNE; 1 ovr:10 cls:10	SNE; 2 ovr:5 cls:5	KNO; 1 Ret	KNO; 2 ovr:12* cls:11	BRH; 1 ovr:5 cls:5	BRH; 2 Ret*	DON; 1 Ret	DON; 2 Ret											12th	32	
2003	GA Motorsports	Vauxhall Astra Coupé	T	MON; 1	MON; 2	BRH; 1	BRH; 2	THR; 1	THR; 2	SIL; 1 ovr:9* cls:9	SIL; 2 Ret	ROC; 1	ROC; 2	CRO; 1	CRO; 2																			16th	14	
2003	Team Dynamics	Vauxhall Astra Coupé	T													SNE; 1 ovr:13 cls:10	SNE; 2 Ret	BRH; 1 ovr:13 cls:13	BRH; 2 ovr:12 cls:12	DON; 1 Ret	DON; 2 ovr:13 cls:13	OUL; 1 ovr:7* cls:7	OUL; 2 ovr:6 cls:6											16th	14	
2005	Team Halfords	Honda Integra Type-R		DON; 1	DON; 2	DON; 3	THR; 1	THR; 2	THR; 3	BRH; 1	BRH; 2	BRH; 3	OUL; 1	OUL; 2	OUL; 3	CRO; 1	CRO; 2	CRO; 3	MON; 1	MON; 2	MON; 3	SNE; 1	SNE; 2	SNE; 3	KNO; 1 Ret*	KNO; 2; 6	KNO; 3; 4	**SIL**; **1**; 5	SIL; 2 Ret*	SIL; 3; 1*	BRH; 1; 5	BRH; 2 DSQ	BRH; 3; 4	12th	54	
2006	Team Halfords	Honda Integra Type-R		BRH; 1	BRH; 2	BRH; 3	MON; 1	MON; 2	MON; 3	OUL; 1	OUL; 2	OUL; 3	THR; 1	THR; 2	THR; 3	CRO; 1	CRO; 2	CRO; 3	DON; 1	DON; 2	DON; 3	SNE; 1; 7	SNE; 2; 9	**SNE**; **3** Ret	KNO; 1; 3	KNO; 2; 7	KNO; 3; 3	BRH; 1 Ret	BRH; 2; 8	BRH; 3; 5	**SIL**; **1**; 1*	**SIL**; **2**; 6*	SIL; 3; 1*	11th	80	
2007	Motorbase Performance	SEAT Toledo Cupra		BRH; 1; 9	BRH; 2; 11	BRH; 3; 9	ROC; 1 Ret	ROC; 2 Ret	ROC; 3 DNS	THR; 1; 11	THR; 2 Ret	THR; 3; 7	CRO; 1; 10	CRO; 2; 5	CRO; 3 Ret	OUL; 1; 10	OUL; 2 Ret	OUL; 3 DNS	DON; 1	DON; 2	DON; 3	SNE; 1	SNE; 2	SNE; 3	BRH; 1	BRH; 2	BRH; 3	KNO; 1	KNO; 2	KNO; 3	THR; 1	THR; 2	THR; 3	14th	16	
2008	BTC Racing	SEAT Toledo Cupra		BRH; 1	BRH; 2	BRH; 3	ROC; 1	ROC; 2	ROC; 3	DON; 1	DON; 2	DON; 3	THR; 1; 18	THR; 2; 17	THR; 3 Ret	CRO; 1	CRO; 2	CRO; 3	SNE; 1	SNE; 2	SNE; 3	OUL; 1 Ret	OUL; 2 DNS	OUL; 3 DNS	KNO; 1	KNO; 2	KNO; 3	SIL; 1	SIL; 2	SIL; 3	BRH; 1	BRH; 2	BRH; 3	26th	0	

† Event with 2 races staged for the different classes.

=== Britcar 24 Hour results ===
Year	Team	Co-Drivers	Car	Car No.	Class	Laps	Pos.	Class Pos.	Ref
2007	(United Kingdom) Geoff Steel Racing	(United Kingdom) Steve Bell (United Kingdom) Simon Leith (United Kingdom) Michael Symons	BMW M3 E36	43	1	470	25th	4th	
