= 2003 British Touring Car Championship =

46th season of the British Touring Car Championship

The 2003 Green Flag MSA British Touring Car Championship season was the 46th British Touring Car Championship (BTCC) season.

== Changes for 2003 ==
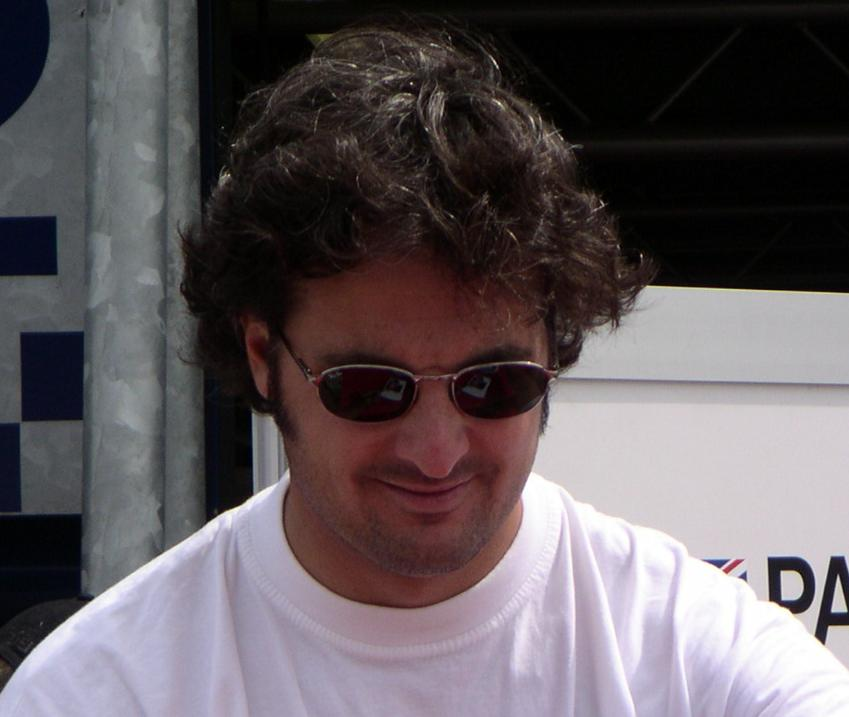
The Drivers' Championship was won by Yvan Muller.

=== Team and driver changes - Touring ===
For 2003 all three main manufacturers in the premier Touring class ran three cars. Reigning champions Vauxhall cut down to three Astra Coupes by axing its Egg Sport squad and entering three VX Racing-liveried cars, run once again by Triple 8. 2002 champion James Thompson and runner-up Yvan Muller remained, and Paul O'Neill moved across from Egg Sport to take the third seat.

MG expanded to three West Surrey Racing-run ZSs, with Colin Turkington joining 2002 drivers Anthony Reid and Warren Hughes after impressing in his debut season with the Team Atomic Kitten MG squad, which had also been run by WSR.

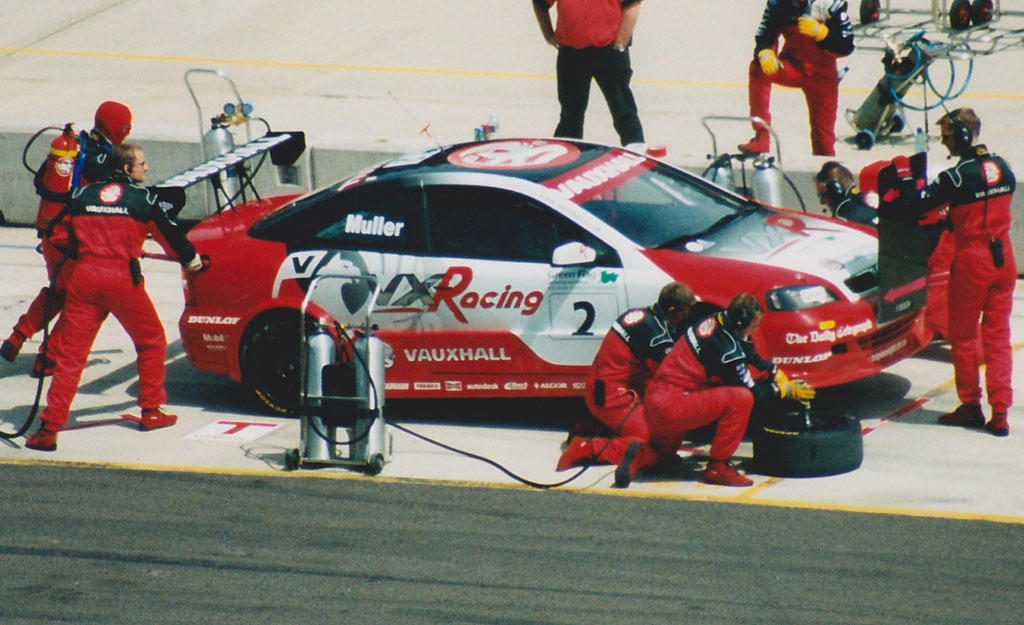
Mandatory pit stops became a feature for all races in the 'Touring' class

Arena Motorsport ran three Civic Type Rs for Honda, with only Irishman Alan Morrison remaining from the 2002 line-up. Matt Neal replaced Andy Priaulx (who left to contest the European Touring Car Championship with BMW) after moving from Vauxhall, and teenager Tom Chilton filled the third seat after an impressive debut year in the Barwell Motorsport-run Astra. Proton again returned as a fourth manufacturer, retaining both David Leslie and Phil Bennett in its two Impians.

Vic Lee Racing switched from the ex-works Peugeot 406 Coupe's to a pair of brand new Peugeot 307 designed by Sergio Rinland, former chief designer at the Sauber Formula 1 team. Reigning independents cup champion Dan Eaves was retained alongside Carl Breeze who raced for the team for most of 2002. Meanwhile, Tim Harvey swapped his crash helmet for a microphone, joining ITV's commentary team. Breeze would leave the team after the Rockingham races, moving to GA Motorsport in the seat vacated by Gavin Pyper. Daniel Buxton would in turn take Breeze's seat at VLR, graduating from the Clio Cup which he had been dominating at the time.

Gavin Pyper had started the season strongly in the GA Motorsport Vauxhall Astra Coupe, winning the independents class five times in the ten races he contested and leading the class when he was forced to withdraw due to a lack of funding. With Breeze now in Pyper's car Paul Wallace switched from GA's production Alfa Romeo to a second Astra which the team had entered for Gareth Howell at Silverstone after a failed attempt to hire 2001 Champion Jason Plato.

Howell himself later reappeared in another ex-Triple 8 Astra for Team Dynamics from the Snetterton rounds onwards.

Production class champions Synchro Motorsport graduated to the touring class with champion driver James Kaye running an ex-works Honda Civic Type R.

Also stepping up was Rob Collard with his self-run team, entering an ex-works Vauxhall Astra Coupe that had been driven by Aaron Slight in 2002.

=== Team and driver changes - Production ===
Barwell Motorsport headed the Production class field after stepping back down from the Touring class and acquiring Synchro Motorsport's title winning Honda Civic Type Rs, which were driven by young debutante Luke Hines, and Alan Blencowe, moving from GA Motorsports. Edenbridge Racing cut down to a single BMW 320i for single seater convert Michael Bentwood, with Tom Boardman switching to John Batchelor's team (now known as Team Varta) in a new Peugeot 307. Jim Edwards Jnr returned in a Honda Accord as the team's second driver. A Peugeot 306 GTi and a second 307 joined the Varta line-up midway through the season together with Jay Wheals and Richard Marsh, and each of the four drivers raced more than one of these chassis across the remainder of the year.

GA Motorsport campaigned Alfa Romeo 156s for a fourth year, with Chris Ryan and Paul Wallace driving. However, Ryan withdrew after an expensive crash in the second round at Brands Hatch, and Wallace was called up to the team's Touring class assault mid-season. Mark Fullalove joined the grid mid-season with his own team, driving the Peugeot 306 he had raced for Tech-Speed Motorsport in 2002, while Jason Hughes was another late entry in a Nissan Primera run by his own Kartworld Racing team.

CMS Motorsport registered an entry with support from Macmillan Cancer for Nick Leason in a Ford Focus previously run by GR Motorsport in the 2001 Season but they were forced to delay their debut and ultimately never raced.

=== Other changes ===
- Dunlop were confirmed as the sole tyre supplier, replacing BF Goodrich
- The series included a race meeting at Rockingham for the first time, replacing Knockhill, which had been left off the calendar due to a lack of agreement between the promoters and the circuit regarding infrastructure upgrades.
- Qualifying sessions at each race meeting lasted 20 minutes (compared to the 43 minutes of 2002) and only determined the starting grid for the first race
- The finishing positions of race 1 determined the grid for race 2
- Mandatory pit-stops were introduced for all Touring class cars in both races
- Alan Gow returned as series administrator midway through the season, replacing Richard West who became the championship's commercial manager.
- In addition to the ITV coverage MotorsTV broadcast all races live.

== Teams and drivers ==
| Team | Car | No. | Drivers | Rounds |
Works Entries
| (United Kingdom) VX Racing | Vauxhall Astra Coupé | 1 | (United Kingdom) James Thompson | All |
| (United Kingdom) VX Racing | Vauxhall Astra Coupé | 2 | (France) Yvan Muller | All |
| (United Kingdom) VX Racing | Vauxhall Astra Coupé | 8 | (United Kingdom) Paul O'Neill | All |
| (United Kingdom) Honda Racing | Honda Civic Type-R | 3 | (United Kingdom) Matt Neal | All |
| (United Kingdom) Honda Racing | Honda Civic Type-R | 7 | (United Kingdom) Tom Chilton | All |
| (United Kingdom) Honda Racing | Honda Civic Type-R | 9 | (United Kingdom) Alan Morrison | All |
| (United Kingdom) MG Sport & Racing | MG ZS | 4 | (United Kingdom) Anthony Reid | All |
| (United Kingdom) MG Sport & Racing | MG ZS | 5 | (United Kingdom) Colin Turkington | All |
| (United Kingdom) MG Sport & Racing | MG ZS | 6 | (United Kingdom) Warren Hughes | All |
| (Malaysia) Petronas Syntium Proton | Proton Impian | 15 | (United Kingdom) David Leslie | All |
| (Malaysia) Petronas Syntium Proton | Proton Impian | 20 | (United Kingdom) Phil Bennett | All |
Independent Entries
| (United Kingdom) Team Halfords | Peugeot 307 | 0 | (United Kingdom) Dan Eaves | All |
| (United Kingdom) Team Halfords | Peugeot 307 | 10 | (United Kingdom) Carl Breeze | 1–5 |
| (United Kingdom) Team Halfords | Peugeot 307 | 30 | (United Kingdom) Danny Buxton | 6–10 |
| (United Kingdom) GA Motorsports | Vauxhall Astra Coupé | 10 | (United Kingdom) Carl Breeze | 6–10 |
| (United Kingdom) GA Motorsports | Vauxhall Astra Coupé | 44 | (United Kingdom) Gavin Pyper | 1–5 |
| (United Kingdom) GA Motorsports | Vauxhall Astra Coupé | 45 | (United Kingdom) Gareth Howell | 4 |
| (United Kingdom) GA Motorsports | Vauxhall Astra Coupé | 46 | (United Kingdom) Paul Wallace | 6–10 |
| (United Kingdom) Synchro Motorsport | Honda Civic Type-R | 11 | (United Kingdom) James Kaye | All |
| (United Kingdom) Collard Racing | Vauxhall Astra Coupé | 21 | (United Kingdom) Rob Collard | All |
| (United Kingdom) Team Dynamics | Vauxhall Astra Coupé | 45 | (United Kingdom) Gareth Howell | 7–10 |
Production Entries
| (United Kingdom) Barwell Motorsport | Honda Civic Type-R | 52 | (United Kingdom) Luke Hines | All |
| (United Kingdom) Barwell Motorsport | Honda Civic Type-R | 53 | (United Kingdom) Alan Blencowe | All |
| (United Kingdom) GA Motorsports | Alfa Romeo 156 | 54 | (United Kingdom) Paul Wallace | 1–5 |
| (United Kingdom) GA Motorsports | Alfa Romeo 156 | 55 | (United Kingdom) Chris Ryan | 1–2 |
| (United Kingdom) Mark Fullalove Racing | Peugeot 306 GTi | 60 | (United Kingdom) Mark Fullalove | 7–10 |
| (United Kingdom) Team Varta | Honda Accord | 69 | (United Kingdom) Jim Edwards Jr. | 1–6 |
| (United Kingdom) Team Varta | Honda Accord | 71 | (United Kingdom) Richard Marsh | 7–10 |
| (United Kingdom) Team Varta | Peugeot 307 | 69 | (United Kingdom) Jim Edwards Jr. | 7–10 |
| (United Kingdom) Team Varta | Peugeot 307 | 70 | (United Kingdom) Tom Boardman | All |
| (United Kingdom) Team Varta | Peugeot 306 GTI | 71 | (United Kingdom) Richard Marsh | 6 |
| (United Kingdom) Team Varta | Peugeot 306 GTI | 72 | (United Kingdom) Jay Wheals | 7–10 |
| (United Kingdom) Edenbridge Racing | BMW 320i | 77 | (United Kingdom) Michael Bentwood | All |
| (United Kingdom) Kartworld Racing | Nissan Primera | 99 | (United Kingdom) Jason Hughes | 6–10 |

== Race calendar and winners ==
| Round | | Circuit | Date | Pole position | Fastest lap | Winning driver | Winning team | Production Class winner |
|---|---|---|---|---|---|---|---|---|
| 1 | R1 | Mondello Park | 21 April | (France) Yvan Muller | (United Kingdom) James Thompson | (United Kingdom) James Thompson | VX Racing | (United Kingdom) Chris Ryan |
| 1 | R2 | Mondello Park | 21 April | | (United Kingdom) Warren Hughes | (United Kingdom) James Thompson | VX Racing | (United Kingdom) Michael Bentwood |
| 2 | R3 | Brands Hatch (Indy), Kent | 5 May | (United Kingdom) James Thompson | (United Kingdom) Matt Neal | (United Kingdom) Matt Neal | Honda Racing | (United Kingdom) Michael Bentwood |
| 2 | R4 | Brands Hatch (Indy), Kent | 5 May | | (United Kingdom) James Thompson | (France) Yvan Muller | VX Racing | (United Kingdom) Michael Bentwood |
| 3 | R5 | Thruxton Circuit, Hampshire | 26 May | (United Kingdom) Matt Neal | (United Kingdom) Matt Neal | (France) Yvan Muller | VX Racing | (United Kingdom) Tom Boardman |
| 3 | R6 | Thruxton Circuit, Hampshire | 26 May | | (United Kingdom) Warren Hughes | (France) Yvan Muller | VX Racing | (United Kingdom) Tom Boardman |
| 4 | R7 | Silverstone Circuit (International), Northamptonshire | 8 June | (United Kingdom) James Thompson | (United Kingdom) James Thompson | (United Kingdom) James Thompson | VX Racing | (United Kingdom) Luke Hines |
| 4 | R8 | Silverstone Circuit (International), Northamptonshire | 8 June | | (United Kingdom) Matt Neal | (France) Yvan Muller | VX Racing | (United Kingdom) Luke Hines |
| 5 | R9 | Rockingham Motor Speedway (International Super Sports Car Long), Northamptonshire | 22 June | (United Kingdom) Alan Morrison | (United Kingdom) Alan Morrison | (United Kingdom) Matt Neal | Honda Racing | (United Kingdom) Tom Boardman |
| 5 | R10 | Rockingham Motor Speedway (International Super Sports Car Long), Northamptonshire | 22 June | | (United Kingdom) Warren Hughes | (France) Yvan Muller | VX Racing | (United Kingdom) Luke Hines |
| 6 | R11 | Croft Circuit, North Yorkshire | 13 July | (United Kingdom) James Thompson | (United Kingdom) Matt Neal | (United Kingdom) Matt Neal | Honda Racing | (United Kingdom) Tom Boardman |
| 6 | R12 | Croft Circuit, North Yorkshire | 13 July | | (France) Yvan Muller | (United Kingdom) Anthony Reid | MG Sport & Racing | (United Kingdom) Luke Hines |
| 7 | R13 | Snetterton Circuit, Norfolk | 9 August | (United Kingdom) James Thompson | (United Kingdom) Alan Morrison | (United Kingdom) Paul O'Neill | VX Racing | (United Kingdom) Luke Hines |
| 7 | R14 | Snetterton Circuit, Norfolk | 9 August | | (United Kingdom) Matt Neal | (United Kingdom) Matt Neal | Honda Racing | (United Kingdom) Tom Boardman |
| 8 | R15 | Brands Hatch (Indy), Kent | 25 August | (France) Yvan Muller | (United Kingdom) Warren Hughes | (United Kingdom) Warren Hughes | MG Sport & Racing | (United Kingdom) Michael Bentwood |
| 8 | R16 | Brands Hatch (Indy), Kent | 25 August | | (United Kingdom) Colin Turkington | (United Kingdom) Colin Turkington | MG Sport & Racing | (United Kingdom) Tom Boardman |
| 9 | R17 | Donington Park (National), Leicestershire | 7 September | (United Kingdom) James Thompson | (United Kingdom) Matt Neal | (United Kingdom) Matt Neal | Honda Racing | (United Kingdom) Luke Hines |
| 9 | R18 | Donington Park (National), Leicestershire | 7 September | | (United Kingdom) Colin Turkington | (France) Yvan Muller | VX Racing | (United Kingdom) Luke Hines |
| 10 | R19 | Oulton Park (Island), Cheshire | 21 September | (United Kingdom) James Thompson | (United Kingdom) Anthony Reid | (United Kingdom) James Thompson | VX Racing | (United Kingdom) Alan Blencowe |
| 10 | R20 | Oulton Park (Island), Cheshire | 21 September | | (United Kingdom) Anthony Reid | (United Kingdom) Matt Neal | Honda Racing | (United Kingdom) Tom Boardman |

== Championship results ==
Points system
| **1st** | **2nd** | **3rd** | **4th** | **5th** | **6th** | **7th** | **8th** | **9th** | **10th** | Fastest lap | Lead a lap |
| 15 | 12 | 10 | 8 | 6 | 5 | 4 | 3 | 2 | 1 | 1 | 1 |

- No driver may collect more than one "Lead a Lap" point per race no matter how many laps they lead.
- Race 1 polesitter receives 1 point.

=== Drivers' Championships ===
| Pos | Driver | MON | | BRH | | THR | | SIL | | ROC | | CRO | | SNE | | BRH | | DON | | OUL | | Pts |
Touring Class (BTC-T)
| 1 | (France) Yvan Muller | **2*** | 2* | 2 | 1* | 1* | **1*** | 2* | 1* | 3 | 1* | Ret | 3 | 3 | Ret | **2*** | 5* | 3 | 1* | 3 | 2* | 233 |
| 2 | (United Kingdom) James Thompson | 1* | **1*** | **5** | 2 | 4 | 5 | **1*** | **2** | 5 | 4 | **2** | 2 | **2*** | Ret | 5 | 10 | **2*** | 3 | **1*** | **Ret*** | 199 |
| 3 | (United Kingdom) Matt Neal | Ret* | Ret | 1* | **7** | **2*** | 11* | Ret* | Ret | 1* | **Ret** | 1* | **5*** | 4* | 1* | 4 | Ret | 1* | **10** | 12 | 1* | 148 |
| 4 | (United Kingdom) Paul O'Neill | Ret | 4 | 3* | 3 | 3 | 3* | 7 | 5* | 10 | 6* | 3 | 6* | 1* | **10*** | 6 | 2 | 6 | 4 | Ret | 5 | 138 |
| 5 | (United Kingdom) Alan Morrison | 3 | 5 | 7 | 8* | 5 | 2 | 4 | Ret | **2*** | Ret* | Ret* | 4 | Ret* | 2 | 14 | 3 | 5 | 5* | 2* | Ret | 125 |
| 6 | (United Kingdom) Anthony Reid | Ret | Ret | 4 | 4 | Ret | 4* | 10 | 4* | 6 | 2* | 5 | 1* | 5 | 3 | 7 | 4 | Ret | 9 | 5 | 4 | 121 |
| 7 | (United Kingdom) Warren Hughes | 4 | Ret | Ret* | 5* | Ret | 6 | Ret | 3 | 8* | 3 | Ret | 10 | Ret | 8 | 1* | **6*** | 4 | 7 | 4 | 8 | 98 |
| 8 | (United Kingdom) Colin Turkington | DNS | Ret | 6 | Ret | 8 | Ret | 3 | 8 | Ret | Ret | 4 | 7 | Ret | 4 | 3* | 1* | 19 | 2 | 6 | 3 | 97 |
| 9 | (United Kingdom) Tom Chilton | Ret | 3 | DNS | DNS | 7 | 10 | 5 | 6 | 4 | 7 | 7 | 12 | 6 | 5 | 8* | 7 | 7 | 6 | Ret | DNS | 70 |
| 10 | (United Kingdom) Rob Collard | 6 | 7 | 13 | Ret | Ret | DNS | Ret | 9 | 7 | 5 | Ret | 8 | 8 | 6 | Ret | Ret | 9* | 16 | 8 | 7 | 42 |
| 11 | (United Kingdom) David Leslie | 5 | 9 | 9 | 6 | 17 | 8 | Ret | 10 | 11 | Ret | 9 | 19 | Ret | 9 | 9 | 8 | Ret | Ret | Ret | DNS | 28 |
| 12 | (United Kingdom) Gavin Pyper | Ret | 6 | 8 | Ret | 6 | Ret | 6 | 7 | 9 | Ret | | | | | | | | | | | 24 |
| 13 | (United Kingdom) Carl Breeze | Ret | 10 | Ret | 10 | 10 | Ret | Ret | DNS | Ret | 9 | 8 | 9 | Ret | 7 | 10 | 15* | 8 | 8 | 15 | 11 | 22 |
| 14 | (United Kingdom) James Kaye | Ret | Ret | 12 | 9 | 11 | 7 | 8 | Ret | Ret | DNS | 13 | 11 | 7* | 11 | 11 | Ret | 10 | 11 | 10 | 12 | 16 |
| 15 | (United Kingdom) Dan Eaves | Ret | 8 | 11* | Ret | 9 | Ret | Ret | Ret | Ret | 10 | 6* | Ret | Ret | 12 | 12 | 11 | 11 | 14 | 11 | 9 | 15 |
| 16 | (United Kingdom) Gareth Howell | | | | | | | 9* | Ret | | | | | 13 | Ret | 13 | 12 | Ret | 13 | 7* | 6 | 14 |
| 17 | (United Kingdom) Phil Bennett | Ret | Ret | 10 | Ret | 14 | 9 | Ret | Ret | 12 | 8 | 10 | 15 | 9 | Ret | Ret | 9 | Ret | 12 | 9 | 10 | 14 |
| 18 | (United Kingdom) Danny Buxton | | | | | | | | | | | 12 | Ret | Ret | Ret | 15 | 14* | 13 | 15 | 14 | Ret | 1 |
| 19 | (United Kingdom) Paul Wallace | | | | | | | | | | | 11 | Ret | DNS | Ret | 17 | 13 | 12 | Ret | 13 | Ret | 0 |
Production Class (BTC-P)
| 1 | (United Kingdom) Luke Hines | **Ret** | DNS | **15** | 12 | 13 | 13 | **11** | **11** | **18** | 11 | 16 | 13 | **10** | **14** | **18** | 18 | **14** | **17** | **17** | 14 | 243 |
| 2 | (United Kingdom) Alan Blencowe | 8 | Ret | 17 | 15 | 15 | 15 | 13 | 12 | 14 | 12 | 15 | 16 | 12 | 15 | 19 | 20 | 16 | 18 | 16 | **17** | 193 |
| 3 | (United Kingdom) Michael Bentwood | 10 | 11 | 14 | **11** | 16 | 14 | 12 | 14 | 16 | Ret | **17** | 14 | Ret | DNS | 16 | **17** | 17 | 19 | 18 | 16 | 186 |
| 4 | (United Kingdom) Jim Edwards Jr. | 9 | 12 | 18 | 14 | Ret | 16 | 14 | 16 | 15 | 14 | Ret | Ret | Ret | Ret | Ret | Ret | 15 | Ret | DNS | 15 | 96 |
| 5 | (United Kingdom) Tom Boardman | Ret | Ret | Ret | DNS | **12** | **12** | Ret | 15 | 13 | **DSQ** | 14 | **Ret** | Ret | 13 | Ret | 16 | Ret | DSQ | Ret | 13 | 57 |
| 6 | (United Kingdom) Paul Wallace | Ret | Ret | 16 | 13 | Ret | Ret | Ret | 13 | 17 | 13 | | | | | | | | | | | 46 |
| 7 | (United Kingdom) Richard Marsh | | | | | | | | | | | 18 | 17 | Ret | Ret | 22 | 22 | 20 | 21 | 19 | 19 | 46 |
| 8 | (United Kingdom) Mark Fullalove | | | | | | | | | | | | | 11 | Ret | 20 | 19 | 18 | Ret | Ret | 18 | 39 |
| 9 | (United Kingdom) Jay Wheals | | | | | | | | | | | | | Ret | 16 | 21 | 21 | Ret | 20 | Ret | Ret | 27 |
| 10 | (United Kingdom) Chris Ryan | 7 | **Ret** | Ret | Ret | | | | | | | | | | | | | | | | | 15 |
| 11 | (United Kingdom) Jason Hughes | | | | | | | | | | | Ret | 18 | Ret | Ret | Ret | DNS | WD | WD | DNS | DNS | 6 |
| Pos | Driver | MON | | BRH | | THR | | SIL | | ROC | | CRO | | SNE | | BRH | | DON | | OUL | | Pts |
Sources:

- Note: **bold** signifies pole position in class (1 point awarded in first race only), italics signifies fastest lap in class (1 point awarded all races) and * signifies at least one lap in the lead (1 point given all races).

=== Independents' Cup ===
| Pos | Driver | MON | | BRH | | THR | | SIL | | ROC | | CRO | | SNE | | BRH | | DON | | OUL | | Pts |
|---|---|---|---|---|---|---|---|---|---|---|---|---|---|---|---|---|---|---|---|---|---|---|
| 1 | (United Kingdom) Rob Collard | **6** | **7** | 13 | Ret | Ret | DNS | Ret | 9 | 7 | **5** | **Ret** | 8 | 8 | 6 | **Ret** | Ret | **9** | 16 | **8** | 7 | 160 |
| 2 | (United Kingdom) James Kaye | Ret | Ret | 12 | 9 | 11 | 7 | 8 | Ret | Ret | DNS | 13 | 11 | 7 | **11** | 11 | Ret | 10 | 11 | 10 | 12 | 151 |
| 3 | (United Kingdom) Carl Breeze | Ret | 10 | Ret | 10 | 10 | Ret | Ret | DNS | Ret | 9 | 8 | 9 | **Ret** | 7 | 10 | **15** | 8 | **8** | 15 | 11 | 141 |
| 4 | (United Kingdom) Dan Eaves | Ret | 8 | 11 | Ret | 9 | Ret | Ret | Ret | Ret | 10 | 6 | **Ret** | Ret | 12 | 12 | 11 | 11 | 14 | 11 | 9 | 126 |
| 5 | (United Kingdom) Gavin Pyper | Ret | 6 | **8** | **Ret** | **6** | **Ret** | **6** | **7** | **9** | Ret | | | | | | | | | | | 80 |
| 6 | (United Kingdom) Gareth Howell | | | | | | | 9 | Ret | | | | | 13 | Ret | 13 | 12 | Ret | 13 | 7 | **6** | 80 |
| 7 | (United Kingdom) Danny Buxton | | | | | | | | | | | 12 | Ret | Ret | Ret | 15 | 14 | 13 | 15 | 14 | Ret | 38 |
| 8 | (United Kingdom) Paul Wallace | | | | | | | | | | | 11 | Ret | DNS | Ret | 17 | 13 | 12 | Ret | 13 | Ret | 37 |
| Pos | Driver | MON | | BRH | | THR | | SIL | | ROC | | CRO | | SNE | | BRH | | DON | | OUL | | Pts |

=== Manufacturers Championship ===
| Pos | Manufacturer | MON | | BRH | | THR | | SIL | | ROC | | CRO | | SNE | | BRH | | DON | | OUL | | Pts |
|---|---|---|---|---|---|---|---|---|---|---|---|---|---|---|---|---|---|---|---|---|---|---|
| 1 | Vauxhall / VX Racing | 1 | 1 | 2 | 1 | 1 | 1 | 1 | 1 | 3 | 1 | 2 | 2 | 1 | 10 | 2 | 2 | 2 | 1 | 1 | 2 | 528 |
| 1 | Vauxhall / VX Racing | 2 | 2 | 3 | 2 | 3 | 3 | 2 | 2 | 5 | 4 | 3 | 3 | 2 | Ret | 5 | 5 | 3 | 3 | 3 | 5 | 528 |
| 1 | Vauxhall / VX Racing | Ret | 4 | 5 | 3 | 4 | 5 | 7 | 5 | 10 | 6 | Ret | 6 | 3 | Ret | 6 | 10 | 6 | 4 | Ret | Ret | 528 |
| 2 | Honda / Honda Racing | 3 | 3 | 1 | 7 | 2 | 2 | 4 | 6 | 1 | 7 | 1 | 4 | 4 | 1 | 4 | 3 | 1 | 5 | 2 | 1 | 318 |
| 2 | Honda / Honda Racing | Ret | 5 | 7 | 8 | 5 | 10 | 5 | Ret | 2 | Ret | 7 | 5 | 6 | 2 | 8 | 7 | 5 | 6 | 12 | Ret | 318 |
| 2 | Honda / Honda Racing | Ret | Ret | DNS | DNS | 7 | 11 | Ret | Ret | 4 | Ret | Ret | 12 | Ret | 5 | 14 | Ret | 7 | 10 | Ret | DNS | 318 |
| 3 | MG / MG Sport & Racing | 4 | Ret | 4 | 4 | 8 | 4 | 3 | 3 | 6 | 2 | 4 | 1 | 5 | 3 | 1 | 1 | 4 | 2 | 4 | 3 | 243 |
| 3 | MG / MG Sport & Racing | Ret | Ret | 6 | 5 | Ret | 6 | 10 | 4 | 8 | 3 | 5 | 7 | Ret | 4 | 3 | 4 | 19 | 7 | 5 | 4 | 243 |
| 3 | MG / MG Sport & Racing | DNS | Ret | Ret | Ret | Ret | Ret | Ret | 8 | Ret | Ret | Ret | 10 | Ret | 8 | 7 | 6 | Ret | 9 | 6 | 8 | 243 |
| 4 | Proton / Petronas Syntium Proton | 5 | 9 | 9 | 6 | 14 | 8 | Ret | 10 | 11 | 8 | 9 | 15 | 9 | 9 | 9 | 8 | Ret | 12 | 9 | 10 | 75 |
| 4 | Proton / Petronas Syntium Proton | Ret | Ret | 10 | Ret | 17 | 9 | Ret | Ret | 12 | Ret | 10 | 19 | Ret | Ret | Ret | 9 | Ret | Ret | Ret | DNS | 75 |
| Pos | Manufacturer | MON | | BRH | | THR | | SIL | | ROC | | CRO | | SNE | | BRH | | DON | | OUL | | Pts |

=== Touring Teams Championship ===
| Pos | Team | MON | | BRH | | THR | | SIL | | ROC | | CRO | | SNE | | BRH | | DON | | OUL | | Pts |
|---|---|---|---|---|---|---|---|---|---|---|---|---|---|---|---|---|---|---|---|---|---|---|
| 1 | VX Racing | 1 | 1 | 2 | 1 | 1 | 1 | 1 | 1 | 3 | 1 | 2 | 2 | 1 | 10 | 2 | 2 | 2 | 1 | 1 | 2 | 438 |
| 1 | VX Racing | 2 | 2 | 3 | 2 | 3 | 3 | 2 | 2 | 5 | 4 | 3 | 3 | 2 | Ret | 5 | 5 | 3 | 3 | 3 | 5 | 438 |
| 2 | Honda Racing | 3 | 3 | 1 | 7 | 2 | 2 | 4 | 6 | 1 | 7 | 1 | 4 | 4 | 1 | 4 | 3 | 1 | 5 | 2 | 1 | 299 |
| 2 | Honda Racing | Ret | 5 | 7 | 8 | 5 | 10 | 5 | Ret | 2 | Ret | 7 | 5 | 6 | 2 | 8 | 7 | 5 | 6 | 12 | Ret | 299 |
| 3 | MG Sport & Racing | 4 | Ret | 4 | 4 | 8 | 4 | 3 | 3 | 6 | 2 | 4 | 1 | 5 | 3 | 1 | 1 | 4 | 2 | 4 | 3 | 216 |
| 3 | MG Sport & Racing | Ret | Ret | 6 | 5 | Ret | 6 | 10 | 4 | 8 | 3 | 5 | 7 | Ret | 4 | 3 | 4 | 19 | 7 | 5 | 4 | 216 |
| 4 | Petronas Syntium Proton | 5 | 9 | 9 | 6 | 14 | 8 | Ret | 10 | 11 | 8 | 9 | 15 | 9 | 9 | 9 | 8 | Ret | 12 | 9 | 10 | 70 |
| 4 | Petronas Syntium Proton | Ret | Ret | 10 | Ret | 17 | 9 | Ret | Ret | 12 | Ret | 10 | 19 | Ret | Ret | Ret | 9 | Ret | Ret | Ret | DNS | 70 |
| 5 | Collard Racing | 6 | 7 | 13 | Ret | Ret | DNS | Ret | 9 | 7 | 5 | Ret | 8 | 8 | 6 | Ret | Ret | 9 | 16 | 8 | 7 | 45 |
| 6 | Team Halfords | Ret | 8 | 11 | 10 | 9 | Ret | Ret | Ret | Ret | 9 | 6 | Ret | Ret | 12 | 12 | 11 | 11 | 14 | 11 | 9 | 26 |
| 6 | Team Halfords | Ret | 10 | Ret | Ret | 10 | Ret | Ret | DNS | Ret | 10 | 12 | Ret | Ret | Ret | 15 | 14 | 13 | 15 | 14 | Ret | 26 |
| 7 | GA Motorsports | Ret | 6 | 8 | Ret | 6 | Ret | 6 | 7 | 9 | Ret | 8 | 9 | Ret | 7 | 10 | 13 | 8 | 8 | 13 | 11 | 18 |
| 7 | GA Motorsports | | | | | | | 9 | Ret | | | 11 | Ret | DNS | Ret | 17 | 15 | 12 | Ret | 15 | Ret | 18 |
| 8 | Synchro Motorsport | Ret | Ret | 12 | 9 | 11 | 7 | 8 | Ret | Ret | DNS | 13 | 11 | 7 | 11 | 11 | Ret | 10 | 11 | 10 | 12 | 10 |
| 9 | Team Dynamics | | | | | | | | | | | | | 13 | Ret | 13 | 12 | Ret | 13 | 7 | 6 | 9 |
| Pos | Team | MON | | BRH | | THR | | SIL | | ROC | | CRO | | SNE | | BRH | | DON | | OUL | | Pts |

=== Production Teams Championship ===
| Pos | Team | MON | | BRH | | THR | | SIL | | ROC | | CRO | | SNE | | BRH | | DON | | OUL | | Pts |
|---|---|---|---|---|---|---|---|---|---|---|---|---|---|---|---|---|---|---|---|---|---|---|
| 1 | Barwell Motorsport | 8 | Ret | 15 | 12 | 13 | 13 | 11 | 11 | 14 | 11 | 15 | 13 | 10 | 14 | 18 | 18 | 14 | 17 | 16 | 14 | 417 |
| 1 | Barwell Motorsport | Ret | DNS | 17 | 15 | 15 | 15 | 13 | 12 | 18 | 12 | 16 | 16 | 12 | 15 | 19 | 20 | 16 | 18 | 17 | 17 | 417 |
| 2 | Team Varta | 9 | 12 | 18 | 14 | 12 | 12 | 14 | 15 | 13 | 14 | 14 | 17 | Ret | 13 | 21 | 16 | 15 | 20 | 19 | 13 | 196 |
| 2 | Team Varta | Ret | Ret | Ret | DNS | Ret | 16 | Ret | 16 | 15 | DSQ | 18 | Ret | Ret | 16 | 22 | 21 | 20 | 21 | Ret | 15 | 196 |
| 3 | Edenbridge Racing | 10 | 11 | 14 | 11 | 16 | 14 | 12 | 14 | 16 | Ret | 17 | 14 | Ret | DNS | 16 | 17 | 17 | 19 | 18 | 16 | 182 |
| 4 | GA Motorsports | 7 | Ret | 16 | 13 | Ret | Ret | Ret | 13 | 17 | 13 | | | | | | | | | | | 56 |
| 4 | GA Motorsports | Ret | Ret | Ret | Ret | | | | | | | | | | | | | | | | | 56 |
| 5 | Mark Fullalove Racing | | | | | | | | | | | | | 11 | Ret | 20 | 19 | 18 | Ret | Ret | 18 | 39 |
| 6 | Kartworld Racing | | | | | | | | | | | Ret | 18 | Ret | Ret | Ret | DNS | DNS | DNS | Ret | DNS | 6 |
| Pos | Team | MON | | BRH | | THR | | SIL | | ROC | | CRO | | SNE | | BRH | | DON | | OUL | | Pts |
