= Daniel Buxton =

British former racing driver and engineer (born 1977)

Danny Buxton
- Nationality: (United Kingdom) British
- Born: Daniel James Buxton; 13 November 1977 (age 48) Crewe, England
- Relatives: Max Buxton (son)

British Touring Car Championship career
- Debut season: 2003
- Former teams: Team Halfords
- Starts: 10
- Wins: 0
- Podiums: 0
- Best finish: 18th in 2003

Daniel James Buxton (born 13 November 1977) is a British racing driver who currently serves as Head of Motorsport at Speedworks Motorsport since 2024, having previously worked with One Motorsport in 2023. His son, Max, currently competes for his team in the British Touring Car Championship.

He won the Ford Fiesta Championship in 1997 and the National Championship in 2001. In 2003, he won the Renault Clio Cup. In 2011, co-founded Scuderia Vittoria. Buxton worked with McLaren Automotive as its Head of the Professional Drive Team, before moving in October 2020 to Head of Customer Racing for McLaren Motorsport.

== Career ==
In 1997, Buxton won the Ford Fiesta Championship, before finishing third in the National Championship the following year. In 2000, he was runner up in the Renault Clio Cup, winning the championship a year later in 2001, with Jim Sugden Motorsport. He drove in the championship for a third year in 2002 for Mardi Gras Motorsport, finishing third with four race wins.

In 2003, Buxton got a drive in the British Touring Car Championship for the Vic Lee ran Team Halfords in a Touring Class Peugeot 307. He joined the season at the halfway point with his first race at round eleven at Croft. He replaced Carl Breeze who had gone to GA Motorsport. He finished fourth in the independents championship with two wins.

In 2003, Buxton came from behind to win the Renault Clio Cup.

From 2011, Buxton and fellow former BTCC driver Tom Ferrier formed Scuderia Vittoria, and entered a team in both the AirAsia Renault Clio Cup (4x Renault Clio Cup Cars) and the British GT (1x Ginetta G55, 1x Ferrari 458 Italia GT). At the conclusion of the 2011 season, the team had achieved 14 wins over both classes, in their debut season.

Buxton started working with McLaren Automotive in 2010, assisting on road car development. Then moved into the role as Head of the Professional Drive Team, before moving in October 2020 to Head of Customer Racing for McLaren Motorsport.

Buxton would later return to the British Touring Car Championship, instead being a team personnel for One Motorsport. At the end of 2022, he would leave the team in favour of rivals Speedworks Motorsport, who competed under the Toyota Gazoo Racing UK banner at the time. He would field his son, Max Buxton, for the second half of the 2025 season, replacing a car driven by Ronan Pearson and Finn Leslie. Buxton would then move Max to a reserve driver role after Oulton Park of 2026 at Speedworks Corolla Racing, stating developmental reasons.

== Racing record ==
=== Complete British Touring Car Championship results ===
(key) (Races in bold indicate pole position - 1 point awarded in first race) (Races in italics indicate fastest lap - 1 point awarded all races) (* signifies that driver lead race for at least one lap - 1 point awarded all races)

Year	Team	Car	Class	1	2	3	4	5	6	7	8	9	10	11	12	13	14	15	16	17	18	19	20	Pos	Pts
2003	Team Halfords	Peugeot 307	T	MON; 1	MON; 2	BRH; 1	BRH; 2	THR; 1	THR; 2	SIL; 1	SIL; 2	ROC; 1	ROC; 2	CRO; 1 ovr:12 cls:12	CRO; 2 Ret	SNE; 1 Ret	SNE; 2 Ret	BRH; 1 ovr:15 cls:15	BRH; 2 ovr:14* cls:14	DON; 1 ovr:13 cls:13	DON; 2 ovr:15 cls:15	OUL; 1 ovr:14 cls:14	OUL; 2 Ret	18th	1

Sporting positions
Preceded by Jim Edwards Jr	Renault Clio Cup; UK series champion 2001	Succeeded by Tom Ferrier
