= Paul Wallace (racing driver) =

British racing driver (born 1958)

Paul Wallace (born 22 October 1958) is a British former racing driver.

== Early life ==
Born on 22 October 1958 to Ruth and Kenneth Wallace, Paul Wallace was educated at The King's School, Grantham. He then studied Mechanical Engineering at UMIST.

Following his degree, Wallace worked for three large corporates: RHP Bearings, Fisons Pharmaceuticals and Mars Electronics. In 1987, he went into business, setting up his own successful software company, PWA, which developed and marketed a range of leading HR/Personnel software applications with many blue chip clients in the UK and worldwide. His company was sold to Great Plains Software (which became a division of Microsoft) in 2000. Following this sale, Wallace decided to pursue his long term wish to compete professionally in motorsports.

== Racing career ==
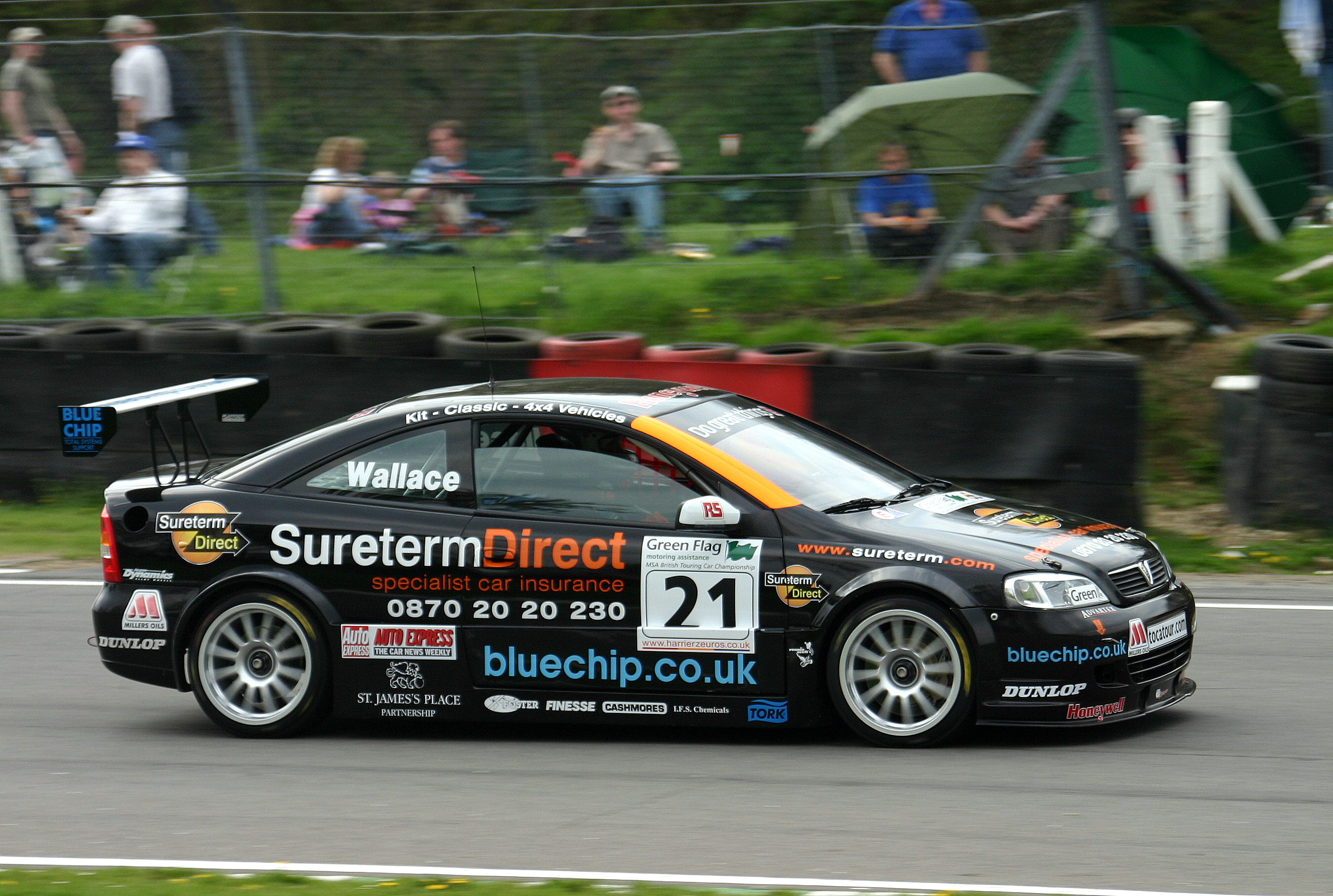
Wallace driving the Team Sureterm Vauxhall Astra Coupé at Brands Hatch during the 2004 British Touring Car Championship season.

Starting in 1998, Wallace competed in the Tomcat Vento Challenge. In 2000 Wallace won the Tomcat Championship title driving a Rover 220 Coupe Turbo. He entered his Rover into the Super Coupe Cup for the 2001 season. After leaving the Super Coupe Cup, Wallace began driving in the Elf Clio Renaultsport UK Cup. He completed two winter championships (2001 and 2002) and the full 2002 season, finishing 19th. In 2003, he began his British Touring Car Championship career.

The first half of the season was spent in the Production Class, with an Alfa Romeo 156 during which he achieved three top-three finishes. For the second half of the year, he moved into the Touring Class, replacing Gavin Pyper in a Vauxhall Astra Coupé. Both cars were run by former racer Gary Ayles and his team, GA Motorsport. Wallace returned for the 2004 BTCC season under the 'Team Sureterm' banner. After round six, he was replaced in the team by Kelvin Burt.

Wallace went on to compete in the MG Trophy from 2005, winning the trophy in 2006 and placed in the top-three in all other seasons. He set four lap records in his final season (2008). He finished motor racing after the 2008 season, to pursue other business activities.

Wallace is now retired and lives in Switzerland.

== Racing record ==
=== Complete British Touring Car Championship results ===
(key) (Races in bold indicate pole position - 1 point awarded in first race, 2003 in class) (Races in italics indicate fastest lap - 1 point awarded all races, 2003 in class) (* signifies that driver lead race for at least one lap - 1 point awarded all races)

Year	Team	Car	Class	1	2	3	4	5	6	7	8	9	10	11	12	13	14	15	16	17	18	19	20	21	22	23	24	25	26	27	28	29	30	Pos	Pts	Class
2003	GA Motorsports	Alfa Romeo 156	P	MON; 1 Ret	MON; 2 Ret	BRH; 1 ovr:16 cls:3	BRH; 2 ovr:13 cls:3	THR; 1 Ret	THR; 2 Ret	SIL; 1 Ret	SIL; 2 ovr:13 cls:3	ROC; 1 ovr:17 cls:5	ROC; 2 ovr:13 cls:3																					N/A	46	6th
2003	GA Motorsports	Vauxhall Astra Coupé	T											CRO; 1 ovr:11 cls:11	CRO; 2 Ret	SNE; 1 DNS	SNE; 2 Ret	BRH; 1 ovr:17 cls:16	BRH; 2 ovr:13 cls:13	DON; 1 ovr:12 cls:12	DON; 2 Ret	OUL; 1 ovr:13 cls:13	OUL; 2 Ret											NC	0	
2004	Team Sureterm GA Motorsports	Vauxhall Astra Coupé		THR; 1 Ret	THR; 2 Ret	THR; 3 Ret	BRH; 1 Ret	BRH; 2; 10	BRH; 3; 13	SIL; 1	SIL; 2	SIL; 3	OUL; 1	OUL; 2	OUL; 3	MON; 1	MON; 2	MON; 3	CRO; 1	CRO; 2	CRO; 3	KNO; 1	KNO; 2	KNO; 3	BRH; 1	BRH; 2	BRH; 3	SNE; 1	SNE; 2	SNE; 3	DON; 1	DON; 2	DON; 3	21st	1	
