= 2002 British Touring Car Championship =

45th season of the British Touring Car Championship

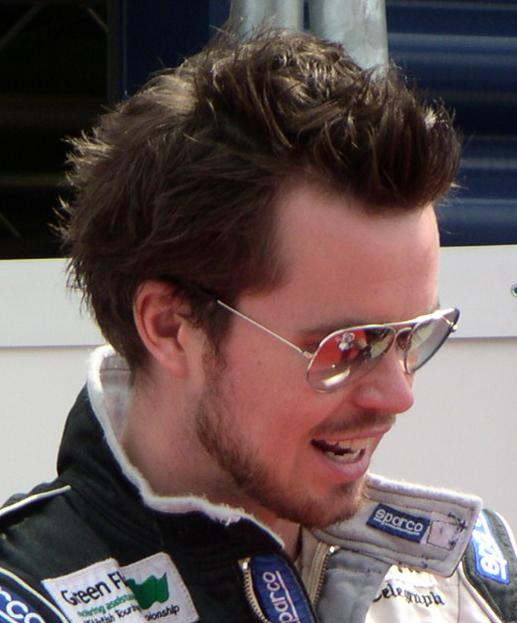
James Thompson won his first BTCC title.

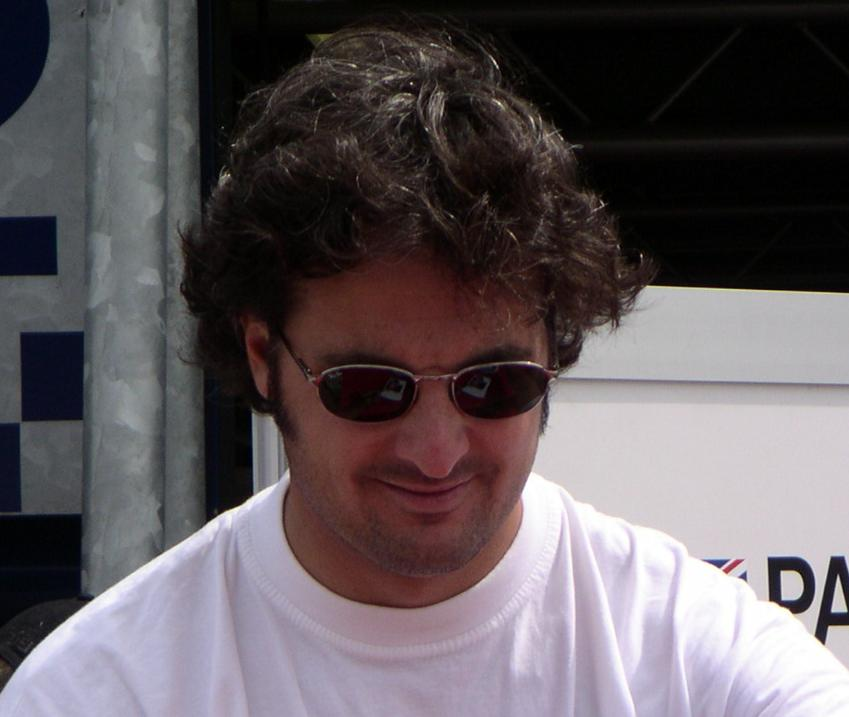
Yvan Muller finished runner up.

The 2002 Green Flag MSA British Touring Car Championship season was the 45th British Touring Car Championship (BTCC) season which began at Brands Hatch on 1 April and concluded at Donington Park on 22 September.

== Changes for 2002 ==
=== Teams and drivers ===
==== Touring Class ====
The second season of BTC-T rules in the top class saw two new manufacturer backed teams enter, with Honda returning and Proton entering for the first time.

Reigning champions Vauxhall again entered four Triple 8-run Vauxhall Astra Coupes. With reigning champion Jason Plato not returning, 2001 runner-up Yvan Muller was partnered by James Thompson in the Vauxhall Motorsport entries while Thompson's place in the Egg Sport entry was taken by Matt Neal, fresh from a season in the European Touring Car Championship, alongside Production class graduate Paul O'Neill.

MG, who had trialled their West Surrey Racing-prepared ZS in the closing stages of 2001 retained experienced touring car hand Anthony Reid and Warren Hughes at the wheel.

After a year absence Honda returned with a pair Honda Civic Type-R's prepared by Arena Motorsport, who had previously entered as an independent in 1999. Guernseyman Andy Priaulx, who crossed over from Formula 3 after impressing on a one off BTCC outing for Vauxhall in 2001, was signed alongside Northern Irishman Alan Morrison, the 2000 Production (then Class B) champion.

In late 2001 it was announced that Proton would enter a pair of manufacturer backed cars backed by Petronas and run under the Petronas Syntium Proton - Team [PSP] banner. Jason Plato was initially linked with the drive before Scottish veteran David Leslie and Phil Bennett, who had been dropped by Vauxhall, were officially announced.

With Peugeot withdrawing their factory backing, Vic Lee Racing now headed the independents class, which was reinstated after a 1-year hiatus, with their pair of 406 Coupes, and acquired sponsorship from the motoring retailer Halfords. Dan Eaves remained and was joined by 1992 champion Tim Harvey, moving across from JSM. The pair were joined later in the year by Formula Renault championship winner Carl Breeze in a third car.

The works MG squad was supported from second meeting onwards by a WSR-run satellite team carrying the name of the girl band Atomic Kitten as part of a sponsorship deal. This team ran the young pairing of Fiesta racer Colin Turkington and Production graduate Gareth Howell.

Barwell Motorsport stepped up from the Production class to complete the Touring grid with a pair of ex-works Vauxhall Astra Coupes driven by New Zealand superbike racer Aaron Slight, who switched to car racing after a successful guest appearance for Peugeot in 2001, and 17-year-old rookie Tom Chilton.

Total Motorsport planned to continue running the Lexus IS200 they had run the previous year with a two-car entry for Steve Sutcliffe and Richard Dean and GR Motorsport planned to graduate from the Production Class with Gordon Shedden driving an ex-JS Motorsport Alfa Romeo 147 but neither of these entries came to fruition.

==== Production Class ====
In the Production class Synchro Motorsport gained the upper hand by stepping up from the Honda Accord to the brand new Civic Type R, recruiting former Honda factory driver James Kaye from Barwell alongside the returning Dave Allan.

The Accords were still campaigned by new squad Beacon Motorsport with Lotus Elise championship graduates Mark Thomas and Spencer Marsh, and John Batchelor's team swapped from Integras to a pair of Accords for Jim Edwards Jnr and Batchelor (again under the name of John B-and-Q), who was injured in a crash during the second meeting at Oulton Park and replaced by Peter Cate and later Hyla Breese.

Tech-Speed Motorsport continued their Peugeot 306 campaign, with Lotus Elise champion Mark Fullalove replacing Vauxhall-bound Paul O'Neill alongside Annie Templeton, and GA Motorsport also returned with their Alfa Romeo 156s, this time campaigned by series newcomers Graham Saunders and Alan Blencowe, accompanied by 2001 driver Gavin Pyper at circuits with enough grid space to accommodate a third car. Pyper received a race ban following an incident at Thruxton and his car was driven by former Ford and Volvo driver Kelvin Burt.

Rob Collard also returned in his self-entered Renault Clio but did not contest a full programme.

The big new arrival to the class was Edenbridge Racing's pair of BMW 320is, after their planned 2001 entry never materialised. Their drivers were teenager Tom Boardman in his second year in the class, and experienced German production saloon racer Norman Simon who had raced in the European Super Production championship in 2001.

TH Motorsport also appeared at selected rounds with a Mitsubishi Carisma for Steve Wood.

=== Other changes ===
- Number of race weekends reduced from 13 to 10
- ITV took over terrestrial broadcasting rights from the BBC
- Greenflag took over as title sponsor from AA.

=== Trivia ===
- Hyla Breese became the first driver since Dave Brodie in 1989 to end the season with a negative points score after collecting 20 penalty points for engine changes taking his final tally to -16.

== Teams and drivers ==
Team	Car	No.	Drivers	Rounds
Works Entries
(United Kingdom) Vauxhall Motorsport	Vauxhall Astra Coupé	2	(France) Yvan Muller	All
(United Kingdom) Vauxhall Motorsport	Vauxhall Astra Coupé	3	(United Kingdom) James Thompson	All
(United Kingdom) egg:sport	Vauxhall Astra Coupé	0	(United Kingdom) Matt Neal	All
(United Kingdom) egg:sport	Vauxhall Astra Coupé	29	(United Kingdom) Paul O'Neill	All
(United Kingdom) MG Sport & Racing	MG ZS	11	(United Kingdom) Anthony Reid	All
(United Kingdom) MG Sport & Racing	MG ZS	12	(United Kingdom) Warren Hughes	All
(Malaysia) Petronas Syntium Proton	Proton Impian	15	(United Kingdom) David Leslie	All
(Malaysia) Petronas Syntium Proton	Proton Impian	20	(United Kingdom) Phil Bennett	All
(United Kingdom) Honda Racing	Honda Civic Type-R	27	(United Kingdom) Alan Morrison	All
(United Kingdom) Honda Racing	Honda Civic Type-R	28	(United Kingdom) Andy Priaulx	All
Independent Entries
(United Kingdom) Team Halfords	Peugeot 406 Coupé	5	(United Kingdom) Dan Eaves	All
(United Kingdom) Team Halfords	Peugeot 406 Coupé	8	(United Kingdom) Tim Harvey	All
(United Kingdom) Team Halfords	Peugeot 406 Coupé	23	(United Kingdom) Carl Breeze	4–10
(United Kingdom) Team Atomic Kitten	MG ZS	21	(United Kingdom) Gareth Howell	2–10
(United Kingdom) Team Atomic Kitten	MG ZS	22	(United Kingdom) Colin Turkington	2–10
(United Kingdom) Barwell Motorsport	Vauxhall Astra Coupé	17	(United Kingdom) Tom Chilton	All
(United Kingdom) Barwell Motorsport	Vauxhall Astra Coupé	111	(New Zealand) Aaron Slight	All
Production Entries
(United Kingdom) Collard Racing	Renault Clio 172	51	(United Kingdom) Rob Collard	1–4, 6
(United Kingdom) Synchro Motorsport	Honda Civic Type-R	52	(United Kingdom) James Kaye	All
(United Kingdom) Synchro Motorsport	Honda Civic Type-R	53	(United Kingdom) Dave Allan	3–10
(United Kingdom) Gary Ayles Motorsport	Alfa Romeo 156	55	(United Kingdom) Graham Saunders	All
(United Kingdom) Gary Ayles Motorsport	Alfa Romeo 156	56	(United Kingdom) Alan Blencowe	All
(United Kingdom) Gary Ayles Motorsport	Alfa Romeo 156	57	(United Kingdom) Gavin Pyper	2–3, 5–10
(United Kingdom) Gary Ayles Motorsport	Alfa Romeo 156	58	(United Kingdom) Kelvin Burt^{†}	4
(United Kingdom) Tech-Speed Motorsport	Peugeot 306 GTi	59	(United Kingdom) Annie Templeton	All
(United Kingdom) Tech-Speed Motorsport	Peugeot 306 GTi	60	(United Kingdom) Mark Fullalove	All
(United Kingdom) Beacon Motorsport	Honda Accord	62	(United Kingdom) Spencer Marsh	All
(United Kingdom) Beacon Motorsport	Honda Accord	63	(United Kingdom) Mark Thomas	All
(United Kingdom) Edenbridge Racing	BMW 320i	77	(United Kingdom) Tom Boardman	All
(United Kingdom) Edenbridge Racing	BMW 320i	78	(Germany) Norman Simon	All
(United Kingdom) Team B&Q Jet York City	Honda Accord	79	(Australia) Hyla Breese	6–10
(United Kingdom) Team B&Q Jet York City	Honda Accord	88	(United Kingdom) John B&Q	1–2
(United Kingdom) Team B&Q Jet York City	Honda Accord	89	(United Kingdom) Peter Cate	3–5
(United Kingdom) Team B&Q Jet York City	Honda Accord	99	(United Kingdom) Jim Edwards Jr.	All
(United Kingdom) TH Motorsport	Mitsubishi Carisma	81	(United Kingdom) Steve Wood	1–4, 10

^{†} Not eligible for points.

== Race calendar and winners ==
All races were held in the United Kingdom (except Mondello Park which was held in Ireland).

Round		Circuit	Date	Pole position	Fastest lap	Winning driver	Winning team	Production class winner
1	R1	Brands Hatch (Grand Prix), Kent	1 April	(France) Yvan Muller	(France) Yvan Muller	(United Kingdom) Matt Neal	egg:sport	(Germany) Norman Simon
1	R2	Brands Hatch (Grand Prix), Kent	1 April	(France) Yvan Muller	(France) Yvan Muller	(United Kingdom) James Thompson	Vauxhall Motorsport	(United Kingdom) Rob Collard
2	R3	Oulton Park (Island), Cheshire	21 April	(United Kingdom) Matt Neal	(United Kingdom) Matt Neal	(France) Yvan Muller	Vauxhall Motorsport	(United Kingdom) James Kaye
2	R4	Oulton Park (Island), Cheshire	21 April	(United Kingdom) Matt Neal	(United Kingdom) Matt Neal	(United Kingdom) Paul O'Neill	egg:sport	(United Kingdom) Spencer Marsh
3	R5	Thruxton Circuit, Hampshire	6 May	(France) Yvan Muller	(United Kingdom) James Thompson	(United Kingdom) James Thompson	Vauxhall Motorsport	(United Kingdom) James Kaye
3	R6	Thruxton Circuit, Hampshire	6 May	(France) Yvan Muller	(France) Yvan Muller	(France) Yvan Muller	Vauxhall Motorsport	(United Kingdom) James Kaye
4	R7	Silverstone Circuit (International), Northamptonshire	3 June	(United Kingdom) Matt Neal	(United Kingdom) James Thompson	(United Kingdom) Warren Hughes	MG Sport & Racing	(Germany) Norman Simon
4	R8	Silverstone Circuit (International), Northamptonshire	3 June	(United Kingdom) Anthony Reid	(United Kingdom) James Thompson	(United Kingdom) James Thompson	Vauxhall Motorsport	(United Kingdom) James Kaye
5	R9	Mondello Park	23 June	(France) Yvan Muller	(France) Yvan Muller	(United Kingdom) Matt Neal	egg:sport	(United Kingdom) Gavin Pyper
5	R10	Mondello Park	23 June	(United Kingdom) James Thompson	(France) Yvan Muller	(France) Yvan Muller	Vauxhall Motorsport	(United Kingdom) Spencer Marsh
6	R11	Croft Circuit, North Yorkshire	14 July	(United Kingdom) James Thompson	(United Kingdom) James Thompson	(United Kingdom) James Thompson	Vauxhall Motorsport	(Germany) Norman Simon
6	R12	Croft Circuit, North Yorkshire	14 July	(United Kingdom) James Thompson	(France) Yvan Muller	(France) Yvan Muller	Vauxhall Motorsport	(Germany) Norman Simon
7	R13	Snetterton Circuit, Norfolk	28 July	(United Kingdom) Matt Neal	(United Kingdom) Matt Neal	(United Kingdom) James Thompson	Vauxhall Motorsport	(United Kingdom) Gavin Pyper
7	R14	Snetterton Circuit, Norfolk	28 July	(United Kingdom) James Thompson	(United Kingdom) Matt Neal	(France) Yvan Muller	Vauxhall Motorsport	(United Kingdom) James Kaye
8	R15	Knockhill Circuit, Fife	11 August	(United Kingdom) Andy Priaulx	(United Kingdom) Matt Neal	(United Kingdom) Matt Neal	egg:sport	(United Kingdom) Gavin Pyper
8	R16	Knockhill Circuit, Fife	11 August	(United Kingdom) Andy Priaulx	(France) Yvan Muller	(United Kingdom) Andy Priaulx	Honda Racing	(United Kingdom) Gavin Pyper
9	R17	Brands Hatch (Indy), Kent	26 August	(United Kingdom) Anthony Reid	(United Kingdom) Anthony Reid	(United Kingdom) Anthony Reid	MG Sport & Racing	(Germany) Norman Simon
9	R18	Brands Hatch (Indy), Kent	26 August	(United Kingdom) Warren Hughes	(United Kingdom) Andy Priaulx	(United Kingdom) Warren Hughes	MG Sport & Racing	(Germany) Norman Simon
10	R19	Donington Park (Grand Prix), Leicestershire	22 September	(United Kingdom) James Thompson	(United Kingdom) James Thompson	(United Kingdom) James Thompson	Vauxhall Motorsport	(United Kingdom) Gavin Pyper
10	R20	Donington Park (Grand Prix), Leicestershire	22 September	(United Kingdom) Andy Priaulx	(United Kingdom) Alan Morrison	(United Kingdom) Alan Morrison	Honda Racing	(Germany) Norman Simon

== Championship results tables ==
Points system
**1st**	**2nd**	**3rd**	**4th**	**5th**	**6th**	**7th**	**8th**	**9th**	**10th**	Pole position	Fastest lap	Lead a lap in feature race
15	12	10	8	6	5	4	3	2	1	1	1	1

- No driver may collect more than one "Lead a Lap" point per race no matter how many laps they lead.

=== Touring Class (BTC-T) ===
Pos.	Driver	BRH		OUL		THR		SIL		MON		CRO		SNE		KNO		BRH		DON		Pts
Touring Class (BTC-T)
1	(United Kingdom) James Thompson	Ret	1*	3	7*	1	2	8	1*	2	**2**	**1**	**Ret**	1	**2**	3	3	NC	Ret	**1**	3	183
2	(France) Yvan Muller	**5**	**2***	1	10*	**Ret**	**1***	9	10	**Ret**	1*	Ret	1*	2	1*	4	2	3	6	5	Ret	163
3	(United Kingdom) Matt Neal	1	4	**4**	**Ret***	2	3*	**6**	3*	1	3	Ret	Ret	**Ret**	Ret*	1	4	4	8	3	Ret	145
4	(United Kingdom) Anthony Reid	4	3	5	Ret	3	Ret*	DSQ	**2***	5	4*	Ret	3	4	10	2	6*	**1**	5*	4	8	136
5	(United Kingdom) Andy Priaulx	12	5	7	Ret	4	5	4	6	6	Ret	4	2*	3	Ret	**7**	**1***	11	7*	2	**4***	116
6	(United Kingdom) Warren Hughes	Ret	8*	2	2	11	10	1	11	10	7	5	11	7	3	Ret	Ret	2	**1***	7	2*	110
7	(United Kingdom) David Leslie	Ret	Ret	8	3	9	9	3	9	3	11	2	7	5	Ret	9	8*	9	Ret	6	6	79
8	(United Kingdom) Paul O'Neill	Ret	Ret	Ret	1*	8	7	2	4*	4	5*	Ret	6*	11	16	6	5*	10	4	Ret	5	77
9	(United Kingdom) Alan Morrison	Ret	Ret	10	5	12	8	5	Ret*	Ret	6	6	Ret*	6	Ret	5	10	8	2	10	1*	68
10	(United Kingdom) Dan Eaves	2	13	20	Ret	6	6	12	7	Ret	Ret	9	4	13	7	12	Ret	Ret	21	9	Ret	43
11	(United Kingdom) Tim Harvey	Ret	7*	Ret	6	5	4*	Ret	5	7	DSQ	Ret	Ret	Ret	DNS	11	9	6	3	Ret	Ret*	43
12	(United Kingdom) Gareth Howell			9	4	10	11	Ret	8	Ret	10	Ret	9	10	5	Ret	13*	5	Ret*	Ret	Ret	32
13	(New Zealand) Aaron Slight	9	12	6	8	7	DNS	10	Ret	DNS	8	7	10	12	9	Ret	12	Ret	9	Ret	Ret	32
14	(United Kingdom) Colin Turkington			19	Ret	Ret	Ret	Ret	12	DNS	DNS	3	5	9	4	8	Ret	Ret	16	11	Ret	29
15	(United Kingdom) Tom Chilton	3	Ret	11	9	13	Ret	11	Ret	9	Ret	Ret	Ret	Ret	8*	10	7	12	10	12	Ret	14
16	(United Kingdom) Phil Bennett	11	6	Ret	DNS	14	Ret	7	13	8	9	12	8	8	18	Ret	DNS	7	12	8	9	9
17	(United Kingdom) Carl Breeze							DNS	16	Ret	18	8	12*	14	6	Ret	14	Ret	DNS	13	7	8
Production Class (BTC-P)
1	(United Kingdom) James Kaye	Ret	NC	**12**	**Ret**	**15**	**12**	**16**	**15**	17	Ret	**11**	**14**	17	11	16	17	**14**	13	16	**11**	210
2	(Germany) Norman Simon	6	Ret	15	13	Ret	DNS	13	Ret	**Ret**	**Ret**	10	13	16	Ret	14	15	13	**11**	15	10	180
3	(United Kingdom) Spencer Marsh	8	Ret	16	11	17	Ret	20	17	Ret	12	Ret	15	22	Ret	15	Ret	17	15	19	13	122
4	(United Kingdom) Gavin Pyper			Ret	Ret	Ret	20			15	Ret	Ret	DNS	**15**	**12**	**13**	**11**	15	14	**14**	12	107
5	(United Kingdom) Jim Edwards Jr.	10	Ret	17	12	21	14	17	Ret	18	13	17	16	24	Ret	DSQ	20	22	17	20	14	101
6	(United Kingdom) Tom Boardman	Ret	10	DNS	DNS	16	17	Ret	22	16	15	18	Ret	19	13	20	22	16	Ret	17	15	98
7	(United Kingdom) Alan Blencowe	Ret	Ret	14	Ret	Ret	13	21	18	19	17	13	Ret	Ret	20	18	21	19	18	Ret	Ret	76
8	(United Kingdom) Mark Fullalove	**Ret**	**Ret**	13	14	18	Ret	18	Ret	Ret	Ret	16	Ret	Ret	19	Ret	16	18	20	18	Ret	69
9	(United Kingdom) Dave Allan					Ret	18	26	19	20	16	15	Ret	18	15	17	19	Ret	19	Ret	17	61
10	(United Kingdom) Mark Thomas	Ret	Ret	18	15	19	16	19	Ret	Ret	19	Ret	17	21	17	19	23	21	Ret	21	16	61
11	(United Kingdom) Graham Saunders	Ret	11	DNS	DNS	22	15	22	21	Ret	Ret	14	Ret	20	14	21	18	20	Ret	Ret	DNS	60
12	(United Kingdom) Rob Collard	7	9	DNS	DNS	DNS	DNS	14	Ret			DNS	DNS									34
13	(United Kingdom) Annie Templeton	13	Ret	Ret	17	24	19	25	Ret	DNS	DNS	19	18	25	Ret	22	24	23	22	22	Ret	26
14	(United Kingdom) Peter Cate					20	21	24	20	Ret	14											23
15	(United Kingdom) Steve Wood	DNS	DNS	Ret	16	23	Ret	23	23											23	Ret	12
–	(United Kingdom) John B&Q	DNS	DNS	Ret	DNS																	0
–	(Australia) Hyla Breese											DNS	DNS	23	21	DNS	DNS	Ret	DNS	DNS	DNS	-16
guest drivers ineligible for points
–	(United Kingdom) Kelvin Burt							**15**	**14**													0^{†}
Pos.	Driver	BRH		OUL		THR		SIL		MON		CRO		SNE		KNO		BRH		DON		Pts

- Note: **bold** signifies pole position in class (1 point awarded all races), italics signifies fastest lap in class (1 point awarded all races) and * signifies that driver lead feature race for at least one lap (1 point given).

^{†} Not eligible for points.

=== Independent's Championship ===
Pos.	Driver	BRH		OUL		THR		SIL		MON		CRO		SNE		KNO		BRH		DON		Pts
1	(United Kingdom) Dan Eaves	**2**	**13**	20	Ret	6	**6**	12	7	Ret	Ret	9	**4**	13	7	12	Ret	Ret	21	9	Ret	145
2	(New Zealand) Aaron Slight	9	12	6	8	7	DNS	10	**Ret**	DNS	8	7	10	12	9	Ret	**12**	Ret	**9**	Ret	Ret	142
3	(United Kingdom) Tim Harvey	Ret	7	**Ret**	6	**5**	4	Ret	5	7	DSQ	Ret	Ret	Ret	DNS	11	9	6	3	Ret	Ret	126
4	(United Kingdom) Gareth Howell			9	4	10	11	**Ret**	8	**Ret**	10	Ret	9	**10**	5	**Ret**	13	**5**	Ret	Ret	**Ret**	126
5	(United Kingdom) Tom Chilton	3	Ret	11	9	13	Ret	11	Ret	9	Ret	Ret	Ret	Ret	8	10	7	12	10	**12**	Ret	123
6	(United Kingdom) Colin Turkington			19	**Ret**	Ret	Ret	Ret	12	DNS	**DNS**	**3**	5	9	**4**	8	Ret	Ret	16	11	Ret	108
7	(United Kingdom) Carl Breeze							DNS	16	Ret	18	8	12	14	6	Ret	14	Ret	DNS	13	7	72
Pos.	Driver	BRH		OUL		THR		SIL		MON		CRO		SNE		KNO		BRH		DON		Pts

=== Manufacturers Championship ===
Pos	Manufacturer	BRH		OUL		THR		SIL		MON		CRO		SNE		KNO		BRH		DON		Pts
1	Vauxhall / Vauxhall Motorsport/egg:sport	1	1	1	7	1	1	6	1	1	1	1	1	1	1	1	2	3	6	1	3	471
1	Vauxhall / Vauxhall Motorsport/egg:sport	5	2	3	10	2	2	8	3	2	2	Ret	Ret	2	2	3	3	4	8	3	Ret	471
1	Vauxhall / Vauxhall Motorsport/egg:sport	Ret	4	4	Ret	Ret	3	9	10	Ret	3	Ret	Ret	Ret	Ret	4	4	NC	Ret	5	Ret	471
2	MG / MG Sport & Racing	4	3	2	2	3	10	1	2	5	4	5	3	4	3	2	6	1	1	4	2	320
2	MG / MG Sport & Racing	Ret	8	5	Ret	11	Ret	DSQ	11	10	7	Ret	11	7	10	Ret	Ret	2	5	7	8	320
3	Honda / Honda Racing	12	5	7	5	4	5	4	6	6	6	4	2	3	Ret	5	1	8	2	2	1	212
3	Honda / Honda Racing	Ret	Ret	10	Ret	12	8	5	Ret	Ret	Ret	6	Ret	6	Ret	7	10	11	7	10	4	212
4	Proton / Petronas Syntium Proton	11	6	8	3	9	9	3	9	3	9	2	7	5	18	9	8	7	12	6	6	145
4	Proton / Petronas Syntium Proton	Ret	Ret	Ret	DNS	14	Ret	7	13	8	11	12	8	8	Ret	Ret	DNS	9	Ret	8	9	145
Pos	Manufacturer	BRH		OUL		THR		SIL		MON		CRO		SNE		KNO		BRH		DON		Pts

=== Touring Teams Championship ===
Pos	Team	BRH	OUL	THR	SIL	MON	CRO	SNE	KNO	BRH	DON	Pts
1	Vauxhall Motorsport	1	7	1	1	1	1	1	2	6	3	161
1	Vauxhall Motorsport	2	10	2	10	2	Ret	2	3	Ret	Ret	161
2	MG Sport & Racing	3	2	10	2	4	3	3	6	1	2	107
2	MG Sport & Racing	8	Ret	Ret	11	7	11	10	Ret	5	8	107
3	egg:sport	4	1	3	3	3	6	16	4	4	5	87
3	egg:sport	Ret	Ret	7	4	5	Ret	Ret	5	8	Ret	87
4	Honda Racing	5	5	5	6	6	2	Ret	1	2	1	78
4	Honda Racing	Ret	Ret	8	Ret	Ret	Ret	Ret	10	7	4	78
5	Team Halfords	7	6	4	5	Ret	4	7	9	3	Ret	47
5	Team Halfords	13	Ret	6	7	DSQ	Ret	DNS	Ret	21	Ret	47
6	Team Atomic Kitten		4	11	8	10	5	4	13	16	Ret	34
6	Team Atomic Kitten		Ret	Ret	12	DNS	9	5	Ret	Ret	Ret	34
7	Team Petronas	6	3	9	9	9	7	18	8	12	6	14
7	Team Petronas	Ret	DNS	Ret	13	11	8	Ret	DNS	Ret	9	14
8	Barwell Motorsport	12	8	Ret	Ret	8	10	8	7	9	Ret	12
8	Barwell Motorsport	Ret	9	DNS	Ret	Ret	Ret	9	12	10	Ret	12
Pos	Team	BRH	OUL	THR	SIL	MON	CRO	SNE	KNO	BRH	DON	Pts

=== Production Teams Championship ===
Pos	Team	BRH	OUL	THR	SIL	MON	CRO	SNE	KNO	BRH	DON	Pts
1	Synchro Motorsport	NC	Ret	12	15	16	14	11	17	13	11	127
1	Synchro Motorsport			18	19	Ret	Ret	15	19	19	17	127
2	Edenbridge Racing	10	13	17	22	15	13	13	15	11	10	115
2	Edenbridge Racing	Ret	DNS	DNS	Ret	Ret	Ret	Ret	22	Ret	15	115
3	Beacon Motorsport	Ret	11	16	17	12	15	17	23	15	13	103
3	Beacon Motorsport	Ret	15	Ret	Ret	19	17	Ret	Ret	Ret	16	103
4	Gary Ayles Motorsport	11	Ret	13	18	17	Ret	12	11	14	12	86
4	Gary Ayles Motorsport	Ret	Ret	15	21	Ret	Ret	14	18	18	Ret	86
5	Team B&Q Jet York City	Ret	12	14	20	13	16	21	20	17	14	59
5	Team B&Q Jet York City	DNS	DNS	21	Ret	14	DNS	Ret	DNS	DNS	DNS	59
6	Tech-Speed Motorsport	Ret	14	19	Ret	Ret	18	19	16	20	Ret	43
6	Tech-Speed Motorsport	Ret	17	Ret	Ret	DNS	Ret	Ret	24	22	Ret	43
7	Collard Racing	9	DNS	DNS	Ret		DNS					10
8	TH Motorsport	DNS	16	Ret	23						Ret	8
Pos	Team	BHGP	OUL	THR	SIL	MON	CRO	SNE	KNO	BHI	DON	Pts
