= Audi Sport North America =

Audi Sport North America is a title used by auto manufacturer Audi for their sports car racing efforts in the American Le Mans Series and the 24 Hours of Le Mans. Two teams have raced under this title:

- Joest Racing, a German team that campaigned the Audi R8 from 2000 to 2002, and later fielded both the R8 and its successor, the Audi R10 TDI, under its own name. Later reused the title with the Audi R15 TDI in 2009.
- Champion Racing, an American team that previously raced the R8 and R10 under its own name before entering the R10 TDI in 2006 under Audi Sport North America.

== See also ==
- Arena Motorsport, who raced under the title Audi Sport UK.
- Oreca, who raced under the title Audi PlayStation Team Oreca.
- Team Goh, who raced under the title Audi Sport Japan.
