= BTC-T Peugeot 406 Coupé =

BTC-T Peugeot 406 Coupe
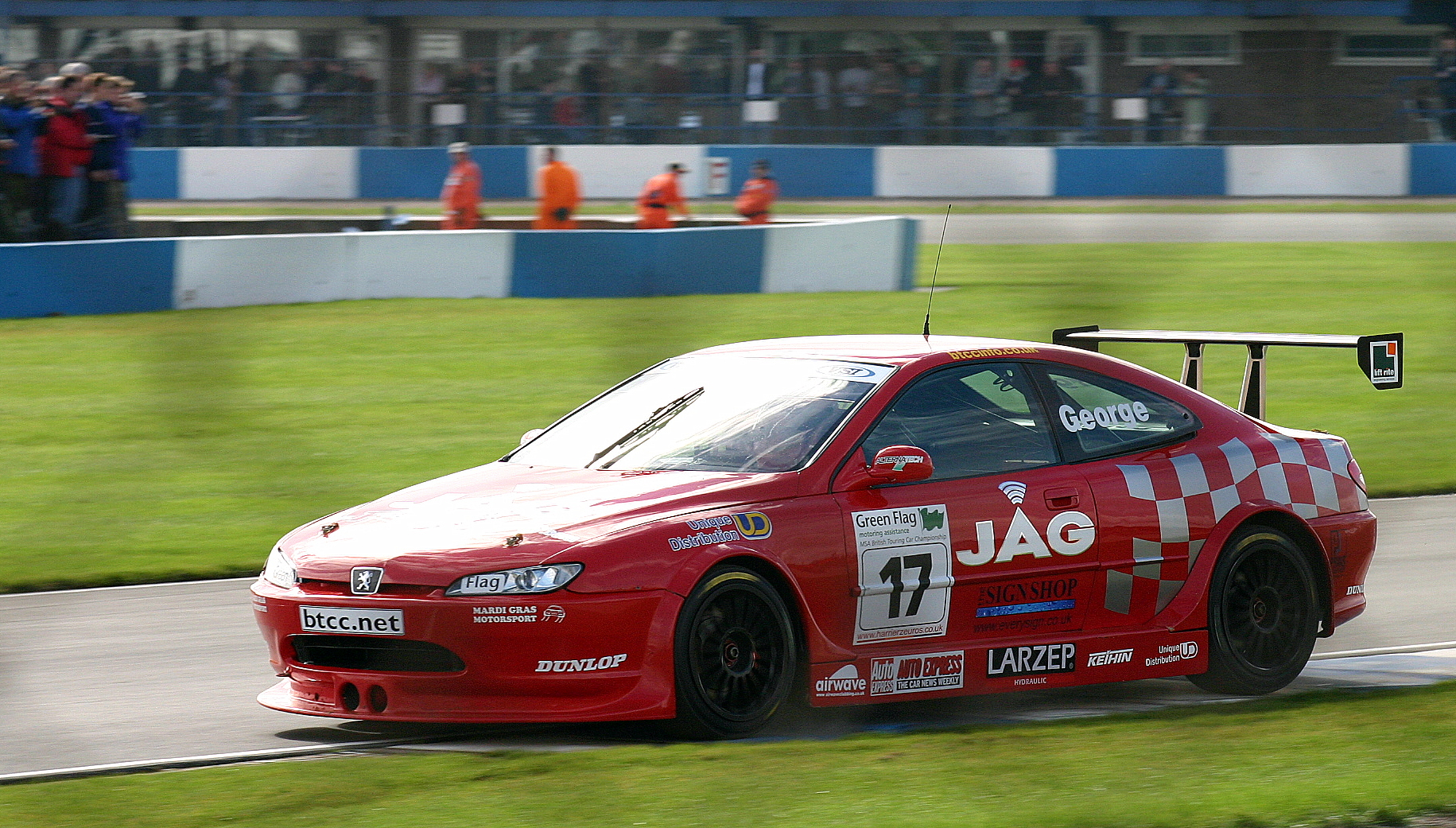
- John George driving the Mardi Gras Motorsport Peugeot 406 Coupé at Donington Park during the 2004 British Touring Car Championship season.
- Category: BTCC
- Constructor: Vic Lee Racing

Technical specifications
- Chassis: Peugeot 406 Coupe
- Length: 4,700 mm (185.0 in)
- Width: 1,892 mm (74.5 in)
- Height: 1,390 mm (54.7 in)
- Axle track: 1,860 mm (73.2 in)
- Wheelbase: 2,700 mm (106.3 in)
- Engine: 2,000 cc (122.0 cu in) In-line 4 NA front-mounted, FWD
- Transmission: Xtrac 6-speed Sequential
- Weight: 1,150 kg (2,535.3 lb) (with driver)

Competition history
- Notable entrants: Peugeot Sport UK/Team Halfords; Mardi Gras Motorsport
- Notable drivers: Steve Soper; Dan Eaves; Matt Neal; Aaron Slight; Carl Breeze; Tim Harvey; John George
- Debut: 2001 BTCC at Brands Hatch Indy Circuit
Races	Wins	Poles	F/Laps
55	0	0	0
- Teams' Championships: 0
- Constructors' Championships: 0
- Drivers' Championships: 0

The BTC-T Peugeot 406 Coupé is a BTC-Touring class racing car that was built for the 2001 British Touring Car Championship season by Vic Lee Racing, who were selected to run Peugeot's official works program for that season.

== 2001 season ==
After a successful 2000 BTCC season, having won the driver's championship for Class B, Vic Lee Racing signed a deal with Peugeot to run in the BTC Touring-class for the 2001 BTCC season. VLR built 3 406 Coupes, and hired Dan Eaves, Steve Soper and Matt Neal as their drivers, but sponsorship issues led to releasing Neal after the first round, being replaced by ex-motorcycle racer Aaron Slight in several rounds. Neal would go on to be critical of the Peugeot effort. The campaign was unsuccessful, with the best results being a trio of 3rd places from Soper at Mondello Park (he was 4th on the road with Production Class winner James Kaye finishing 2nd) and Eaves, at Oulton Park and the last round of the season, held at the Brands Hatch Indy circuit. The car's large size limited its agility and made it less competitive than its rivals.

== 2002 season ==
After the poor performances in 2001, Peugeot withdraw their works support, choosing instead to focus on their more successful World Rally Championship campaign. The team, in 2002, now renamed Team Halfords after gaining sponsorship from Halfords, continued racing with the 406. Eaves stayed with the team, while 1992 champion Tim Harvey and Carl Breeze joined the team. A second unsuccessful season followed; with the best result being a second place from Eaves in the opening round at Brands Hatch. Harvey added a 2nd podium with 3rd in race 2 at the second Brands Hatch meeting. Despite the lack of overall competitiveness, Dan Eaves and Tim Harvey finished the season 1st and 3rd respectively in the Independents Cup. For 2003, the team switched to the Sergio Rinland designed Peugeot 307, with the hope of gaining more competitiveness.

== 2004 season ==
The 406 Coupes remained unused in 2003, but halfway through the 2004 season, Mardi Gras Motorsport decided to replace their LPG-powered, Super 2000-specification Honda Civic with a 406 Coupe. The car proved barely more successful than its predecessor - finishing no higher than a 12th place at Knockhill in the 4 rounds it entered. The car did not reappear for the 2005 season.
