= Gavin Pyper =

British racing driver (born 1979)

- Nationality: (United Kingdom) British
- Born: Gavin Neil Pyper; 12 August 1979 (age 47) Blairgowrie, Scotland

British Touring Car Championship
- Years active: 2000–2004
- Teams: GA Motorsport; GA-Janspeed Racing
- Starts: 54
- Wins: 0 (7 in class)
- Poles: 0 (6 in class)
- Fastest laps: 0 (9 in class)
- Best finish: 12th in 2003

Gavin Neil Pyper (born 12 August 1979) is a British motor racing driver.

== Racing career ==
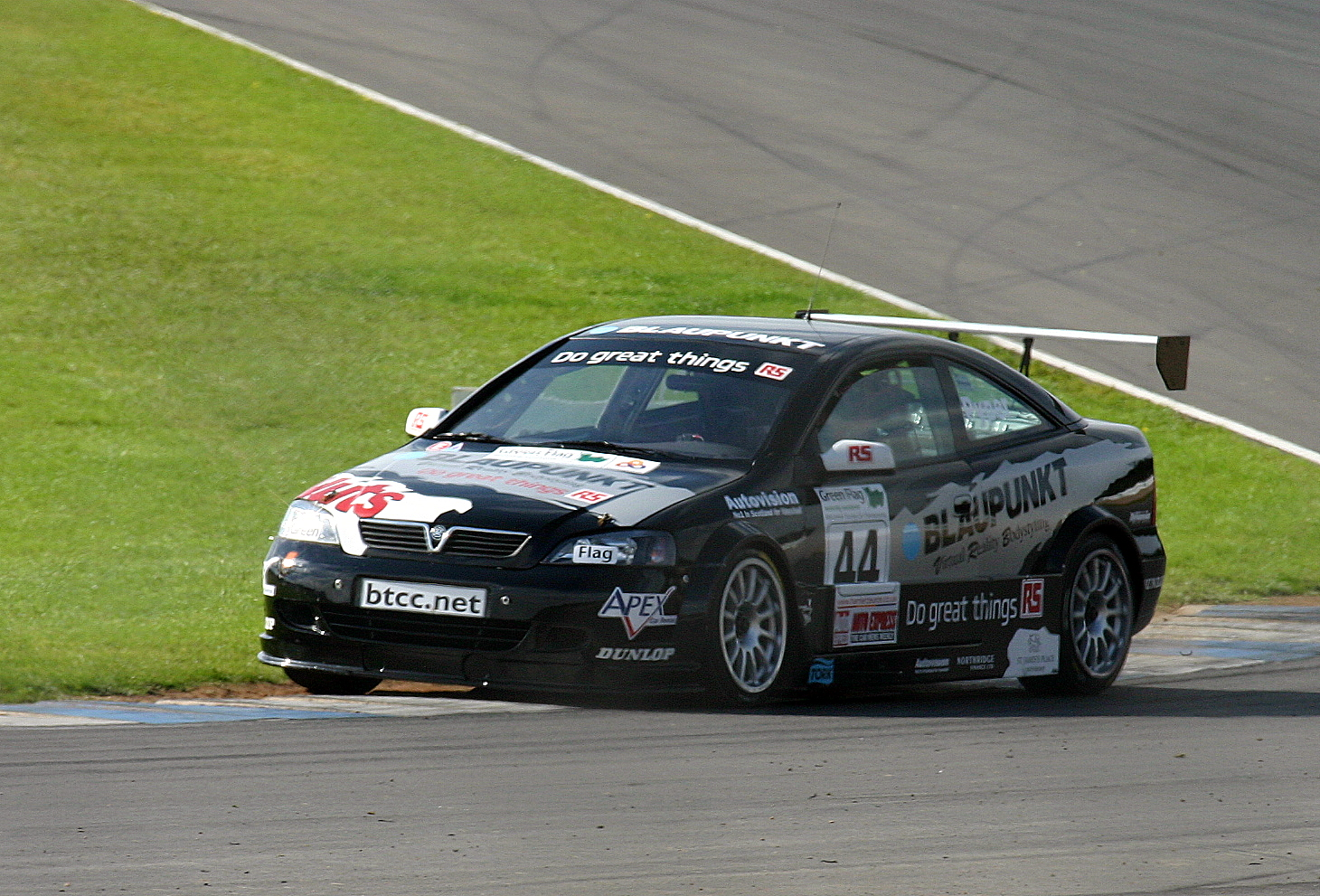
Pyper driving the GA Motorsport-entered Vauxhall Astra Coupé at Donington Park during the 2004 British Touring Car Championship season.

Pyper first made a big impression in racing by winning the Formula Vauxhall winter series with team DFR. In 1999, he entered the Vauxhall Vectra SRi V6 Challenge with Lloyds UDT, getting two wins in the year. When the British Touring Car Championship started a second class B in 2000 to boost the size of the grid, he entered an Alfa Romeo 156 which was run by former touring car driver Gary Ayles. For 2001, the BTCC changed its regulations, with class B now called production class, Pyper drove again with an Alfa Romeo 156 this time for GA Janspeed. He finished sixth in class in what was a large and competitive field. With the newly named GA Motorsport a year later, he did even better, finishing fourth in class. For 2003, GA Motorsport and Pyper stepped up to the main touring class with a Vauxhall Astra Coupé. Despite making a great start, leading the independents points at the halfway point, a lack of funding brought an early end to his season with his seat being taken by Paul Wallace. He still finished the season in fifth in the independents despite his short season. He made another BTCC challenge in 2004, but again finances saw him only enter for one meeting all season.

== Racing record ==
=== Complete British Touring Car Championship results ===
(key) Races in bold indicate pole position (1 point awarded 2001-2002 all races, 2003-2004 just for first race, 2000–2002 in class) Races in italics indicate fastest lap (1 point awarded 2001-2004 all races, 2000–2002 in class) * signifies that driver lead race for at least one lap (1 point given 2001 just for feature race, 2003-2004 all races, 2001 for leading in class)

Year	Team	Car	Class	1	2	3	4	5	6	7	8	9	10	11	12	13	14	15	16	17	18	19	20	21	22	23	24	25	26	27	28	29	30	Pen.	Pos	Pts	Class
2000	Gary Ayles Motorsport	Alfa Romeo 156	B	BRH; 1	BRH; 2	DON; 1	DON; 2	THR; 1	THR; 2	KNO; 1	KNO; 2	OUL; 1	OUL; 2	SIL; 1	SIL; 2	CRO; 1	CRO; 2	SNE; 1	SNE; 2	DON; 1	DON; 2	BRH; 1 Ret	BRH; 2 DNS	OUL; 1 Ret	OUL; 2 DNS	SIL; 1	SIL; 2								N/A	1	16th
2001	GA -Janspeed Racing	Alfa Romeo 156	P	BRH; 1; 7†	BRH; 2 ovr:10 cls:4	THR; 1 Ret	THR; 2 DNS	OUL; 1 ovr:5 cls:5	OUL; 2 ovr:4* cls:1	SIL; 1 Ret	SIL; 2 Ret	MON; 1 ovr:7 cls:4	MON; 2 Ret	DON; 1 ovr:9 cls:2	**DON**; **2** Ret*	KNO; 1 ovr:11 cls:6	KNO; 2 Ret	SNE; 1 Ret	SNE; 2 Ret*	CRO; 1 ovr:4 cls:2	CRO; 2 Ret	OUL; 1 ovr:7 cls:3	OUL; 2 ovr:9 cls:3	SIL; 1 ovr:9 cls:5	SIL; 2 ovr:12* cls:4	DON; 1 ovr:9 cls:6	DON; 2 Ret	BRH; 1 Ret	BRH; 2 ovr:5* cls:1					-15	N/A	120	6th
2002	Gary Ayles Motorsport	Alfa Romeo 156	P	BRH; 1	BRH; 2	OUL; 1 Ret	OUL; 2 DNS	THR; 1 Ret	THR; 2 ovr:20 cls:9	SIL; 1	SIL; 2	MON; 1 ovr:11 cls:1	MON; 2 Ret	CRO; 1 Ret	CRO; 2 DNS	**SNE**; **1** ovr:15 cls:1	**SNE**; **2** ovr:12 cls:2	**KNO**; **1** ovr:13 cls:1	**KNO**; **2** ovr:11* cls:1	BRH; 1 ovr:15 cls:3	BRH; 2 ovr:14 cls:3	**DON**; **1** ovr:14 cls:1	DON; 2 ovr:12 cls:3											-20	N/A	107	4th
2003	GA Motorsport	Vauxhall Astra Coupé	T	MON; 1 Ret	MON; 2 ovr:6 cls:6	BRH; 1 ovr:8 cls:8	BRH; 2 Ret	THR; 1 ovr:6 cls:6	THR; 2 Ret	SIL; 1 ovr:6 cls:6	SIL; 2 ovr:7 cls:7	ROC; 1 ovr:9 cls:9	ROC; 2 Ret	CRO; 1	CRO; 2	SNE; 1	SNE; 2	BRH; 1	BRH; 2	DON; 1	DON; 2	OUL; 1	OUL; 2												12th	24	
2004	Team Sureterm GA Motorsports	Vauxhall Astra Coupé		THR; 1	THR; 2	THR; 3	BRH; 1	BRH; 2	BRH; 3	SIL; 1	SIL; 2	SIL; 3	OUL; 1	OUL; 2	OUL; 3	MON; 1	MON; 2	MON; 3	CRO; 1	CRO; 2	CRO; 3	KNO; 1	KNO; 2	KNO; 3	BRH; 1	BRH; 2	BRH; 3	SNE; 1	SNE; 2	SNE; 3	DON; 1; 12	DON; 2 Ret	DON; 3 Ret		NC	0	

† Event with 2 races staged for the different classes.

== Sources ==
- BTCC Racing page
- Driver page
