= Alan Morrison (racing driver) =

British racing driver (born 1971)

- Nationality: (United Kingdom) British
- Born: 3 March 1971 (age 55) Killyleagh, County Down, Northern Ireland

British Touring Car Championship
- Years active: 2000, 2002–2003, 2009
- Teams: Touring Car V.I.P. Club; Honda Racing; Team Aon
- Starts: 76
- Wins: 1 (13 in class)
- Poles: 1 (10 in class)
- Fastest laps: 2 (13 in class)
- Best finish: 5th in 2003

Championship titles
- 2000 1998: BTCC - Class B Ford Fiesta Championship

Alan Morrison (born 3 March 1971) is a British racing driver.

== Racing career ==
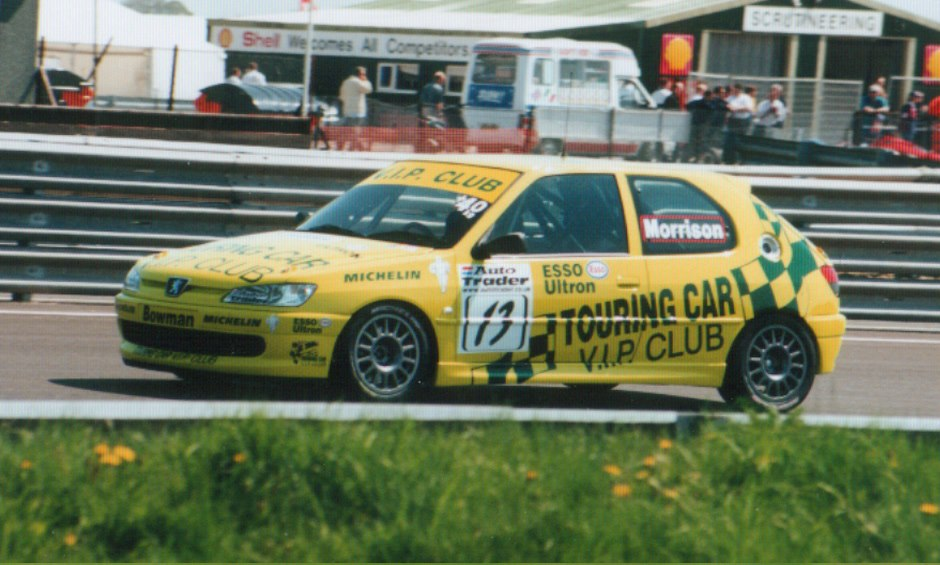
Morrison driving the Touring Car V.I.P. Club Peugeot 306 GTi during the 2000 British Touring Car Championship season.

A former British Champion in motocross and winner of a single 125cc Motocross World Championship race, Morrison first started circuit racing in the Ford Fiesta championship in 1997 and again this time winning the championship in 1998. He entered the Vauxhall Vectra Sri Challenge in 1999, finishing second on points.

For 2000, Morrison was in the British Touring Car Championship's newly introduced Class B. With his Peugeot 306 Gti he won the class championship with 13 class victories. He is probably best known that year for a huge crash at Brands Hatch where he went into a barrel roll going round the Grand Prix circuit. In 2002, he got a BTCC touring class works drive for Honda, ran by Arena in a Honda Civic Type-R. He drove with Andy Priaulx as teammate and finished ninth in the championship, including one race win, at Donington Park. He stayed with the team the following year with a new teammate in Matt Neal, and finished an impressive fifth on points. Morrison returned to the BTCC in 2009, as a late entry back with Arena Motorsport (under the Team Aon banner) in a Ford Focus ST but left the team after the Oulton Park weekend.

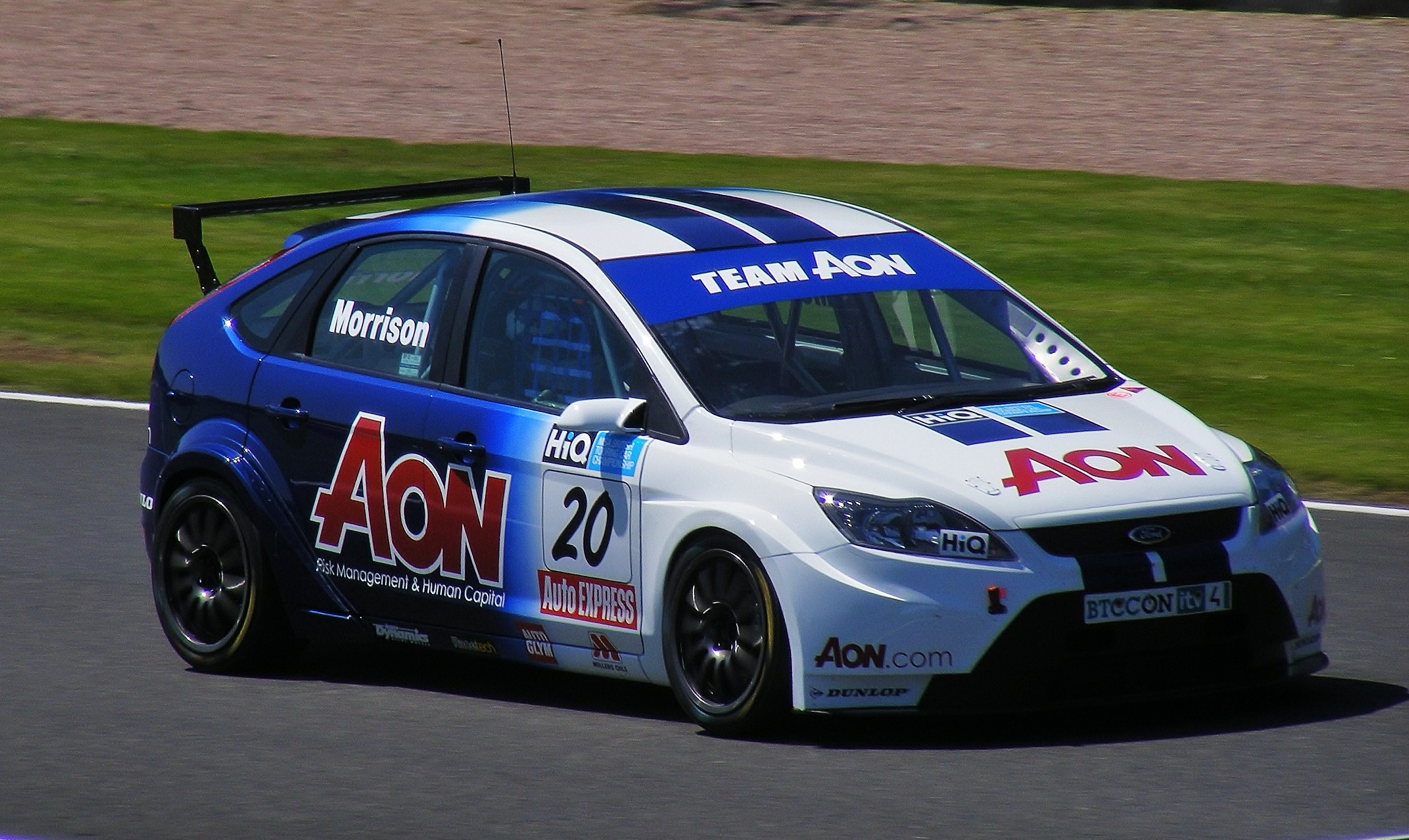
Morrison driving for Team Aon at the Oulton Park round of the 2009 BTCC season.

== Racing record ==
=== Complete British Touring Car Championship results ===
(key) Races in bold indicate pole position (1 point awarded – 2001 all races, 2006–present just in first race, 2001 in class) Races in italics indicate fastest lap (1 point awarded – 2001–present all races, 2001 in class) * signifies that driver lead race for at least one lap (1 point given – 2001–present all races)

Year	Team	Car	Class	1	2	3	4	5	6	7	8	9	10	11	12	13	14	15	16	17	18	19	20	21	22	23	24	25	26	27	28	29	30	Pen.	DC	Pts	Class
2000	Touring Car V.I.P. Club	Peugeot 306 GTi	B	**BRH**; **1** ovr:12 cls:1	**BRH**; **2** Ret	**DON**; **1** ovr:10 cls:1	**DON**; **2** ovr:13 cls:3	**THR**; **1** ovr:11 cls:1	**THR**; **2** ovr:7 cls:1	KNO; 1 NC	**KNO**; **2** ovr:9 cls:1	OUL; 1 Ret	OUL; 2 Ret	SIL; 1 ovr:10 cls:1	SIL; 2 ovr:7 cls:1	**CRO**; **1** ovr:10 cls:1	**CRO**; **2** ovr:7 cls:2	SNE; 1 ovr:7 cls:1	**SNE**; **2** ovr:13 cls:5	DON; 1 ovr:11 cls:1	DON; 2 ovr:12 cls:2	BRH; 1 ovr:11 cls:1	BRH; 2 ovr:15 cls:5	OUL; 1 ovr:10 cls:1	OUL; 2 ovr:13 cls:5	SIL; 1 ovr:9 cls:1	SIL; 2 Ret								N/A	**264**	**1st**
2002	Honda Racing	Honda Civic Type-R	T	BRH; 1 Ret	BRH; 2 Ret	OUL; 1 ovr:10 cls:10	OUL; 2 ovr:5 cls:5	THR; 1 ovr:12 cls:12	THR; 2 ovr:8 cls:8	SIL; 1 ovr:5 cls:5	SIL; 2 Ret*	MON; 1 Ret	MON; 2 ovr:6 cls:6	CRO; 1 ovr:6 cls:6	CRO; 2 Ret*	SNE; 1 ovr:6 cls:6	SNE; 2 Ret	KNO; 1 ovr:5 cls:5	KNO; 2 ovr:10 cls:10	BRH; 1 ovr:8 cls:8	BRH; 2 ovr:2 cls:2	DON; 1 ovr:10 cls:10	DON; 2 ovr:1* cls:1											−5	9th	68	
2003	Honda Racing	Honda Civic Type-R	T	MON; 1 ovr:3 cls:3	MON; 2 ovr:5 cls:5	BRH; 1 ovr:7 cls:7	BRH; 2 ovr:8* cls:8	THR; 1 ovr:5 cls:5	THR; 2 ovr:2 cls:2	SIL; 1 ovr:4 cls:4	SIL; 2 Ret	**ROC**; **1** ovr:2* cls:2	ROC; 2 Ret*	CRO; 1 Ret*	CRO; 2 ovr:4 cls:4	SNE; 1 Ret*	SNE; 2 ovr:2 cls:2	BRH; 1 ovr:14 cls:14	BRH; 2 ovr:3 cls:3	DON; 1 ovr:5 cls:5	DON; 2 ovr:5* cls:5	OUL; 1 ovr:2* cls:2	OUL; 2 Ret												5th	125	
2009	Team Aon	Ford Focus ST		BRH; 1; 13	BRH; 2; 15	BRH; 3; 12	THR; 1 Ret	THR; 2 Ret	THR; 3 Ret	DON; 1; 16	DON; 2; 13	DON; 3; 15	OUL; 1; 14	OUL; 2; 10	OUL; 3; 10	CRO; 1	CRO; 2	CRO; 3	SNE; 1	SNE; 2	SNE; 3	KNO; 1	KNO; 2	KNO; 3	SIL; 1	SIL; 2	SIL; 3	ROC; 1	ROC; 2	ROC; 3	BRH; 1	BRH; 2	BRH; 3		24th	2	
