= BTC-T Honda Civic Type-R =

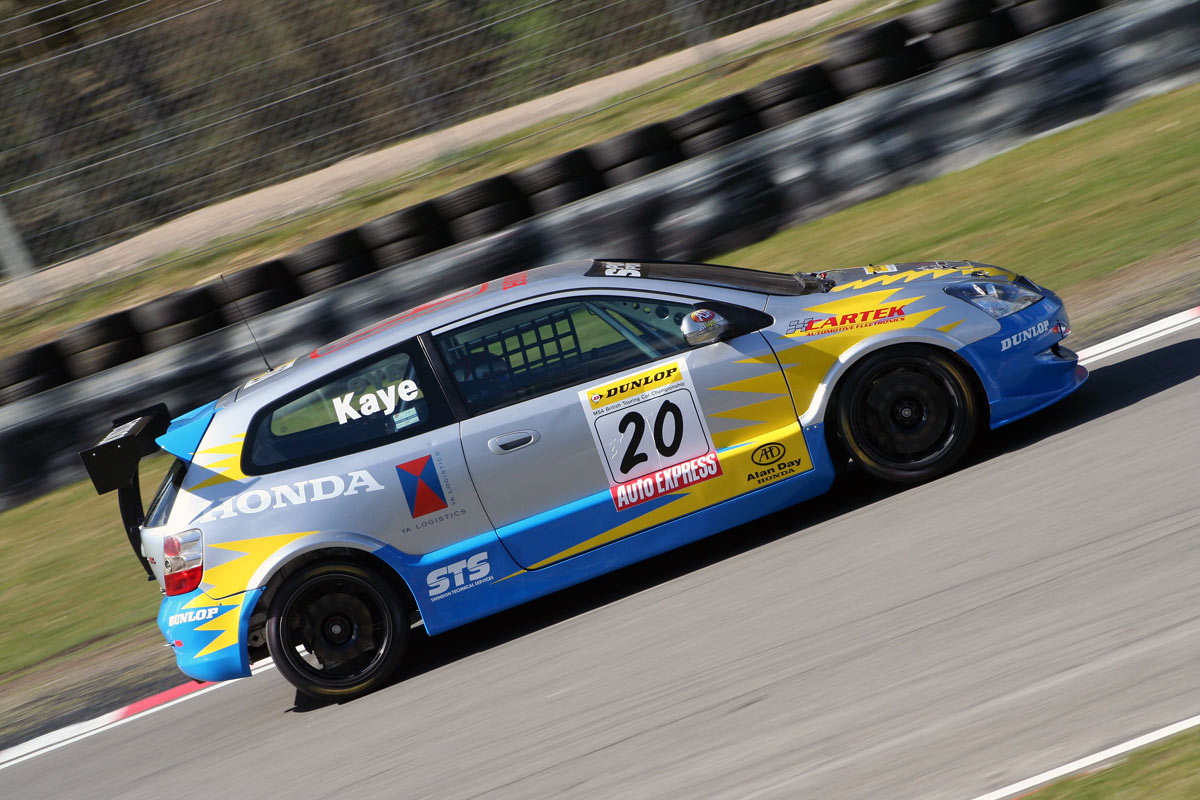
- Category: BTCC
- Constructor: Arena Motorsport

Technical specifications
- Chassis: Honda Civic (seventh generation)
- Length: 4,140 mm (163.0 in)
- Width: 1,784 mm (70.2 in)
- Wheelbase: 2,700 mm (106.3 in)
- Engine: 2,000 cc (122.0 cu in) 270 hp (201 kW; 274 PS) In-line 4 NA front-mounted, FWD
- Transmission: 6-speed Sequential
- Weight: 1,150 kg (2,535.3 lb)

Competition history
- Notable entrants: Honda Racing/Arena Motorsport; Synchro Motorsport; Team Halfords; Fast-Tec Motorsport
- Debut: 2002 BTCC at Brands Hatch GP Circuit
- Teams' Championships: 0
- Constructors' Championships: 0
- Drivers' Championships: 0

The BTC-T Honda Civic Type-R is a BTC-Touring class racing car that was built for the 2002 British Touring Car Championship season by Arena Motorsport, who ran Honda's official works program.

== Works career ==
In 2002, Honda announced that it would return to the BTCC after a year's absence, with its works program being run by Arena Motorsport. Andy Priaulx and Alan Morrison were announced as the two drivers who would drive in 2002, and, after a fairly slow start, Priaulx achieved the cars first ever podium, with a second place at the Croft feature race, and then a victory at Knockhill, with Morrison also winning his first race, at the last event of the season. Honda would finish 3rd in the Constructor's championship at the end of the season, with Priaulx finishing a fine 5th in the Driver's championship.

2003 would see an even stronger performance, with Honda Racing expanding to a 3-car team, with Matt Neal and Tom Chilton being entered, along with the retained Morrison. In addition to this, James Kaye drove an ex-works Civic Type-R for his independent Synchro Motorsport team, having previously taken the Production Class championship in a Production-spec Civic Type-R. Neal finished 3rd in the Driver's championship, and Honda would finish 2nd in the Constructor's championship, with 6 wins - moving ahead of MG. James Kaye also finished runner-up in the Independent's championship.

For 2004, however, Honda Racing had slimmed down to just a single-car team, driven by Chilton. Team Dynamics replaced its Vauxhall Astra Coupe with a pair of 2003-spec Civics, with Matt Neal and Dan Eaves joining the team (Eaves bringing sponsorship from Halfords, with the team being renamed to Team Halfords to reflect this), whilst James Kaye continued with his Synchro Motorsport Civic. Honda once again finished second in the Constructors championship, with 6 wins being shared between Team Halfords and Honda Racing. Dan Eaves and Matt Neal finished a close 3rd and 4th respectively in the Independents championship, although Neal was the highest placed of the drivers in the main standings - finishing 5th.

== Later career ==
In 2005, Honda withdrew their works support altogether, and Team Halfords replaced the 2003-spec Civics with a trio of BTC-T Honda Integra Type Rs, designed and built in-house. Arena Motorsport continued to enter Chilton, and James Kaye also continued to drive his Civic, but the cars proved to be much less successful - Chilton's 5th in the championship being a reflection of a smaller grid, although he did achieve 4 wins in the season.

2006 saw Arena Motorsport withdraw, with Mark Proctor's Fast-Tec Motorsport team replacing the Astra of the previous season with a Civic, and Kaye once more entering a Civic. Kaye's 6th in the Independent's championship was the best result out of the two drivers, achieving a solitary podium. Neither driver returned for the 2007 season, and the Civics were thus retired.
