= Arena Motorsport =

British motor racing team

(United Kingdom) Arena Motorsport
- Founded: 1999
- Founder(s): Mike Earle
- Folded: 2012
- Base: Littlehampton, West Sussex, England
- Team principal(s): Mike Earle
- Former series: 12 Hours of Sebring; 24 Hours of Le Mans; European Le Mans Series; BTCC; Le Mans Series; A1 Grand Prix; British F3; WTCC
- Noted drivers: (United Kingdom) Tom Chilton (Sweden) Stefan Johansson (United Kingdom) Alan Morrison (United Kingdom) Tom Onslow-Cole (United Kingdom) Matt Neal (United Kingdom) Andy Priaulx (United Kingdom) Guy Smith
- Teams' Championships: 2001 ELMS; 2010 BTCC Ind. Team
- Drivers' Championships: 2010 BTCC Ind. (Chilton)

Arena International Motorsport was a British motor racing team founded by Mike Earle. Earle originally ran the Onyx Formula One team from the same base in Littlehampton, before selling the team. At the end of 2012 the team's new owners, Capsicum Racing Limited, placed the company into CVA.

Earle also created 3001 International and Grand Prix Design, which later morphed into Arena International Motorsport. The team made their racing debut in the British Touring Car Championship in 1999, where they ran for many years before moving to become a factory-supported Zytek sports car team in the Le Mans Series in 2007. They returned to the BTCC running the Team Aon operation, until switching to the World Touring Car Championship for the 2012 season.

== BTCC ==
=== Renault Laguna (1999) ===
Arena's first season saw the team running a year-old Renault Laguna for Russell Spence, who was later replaced by Will Hoy. The team then disappeared from the series.

=== Honda and Team Honda (2001–2005) ===
In 2001 Arena approached Honda about running a Civic on an independent basis. However, Honda chose to give the team full manufacturer backing for the 2002 season, with Alan Morrison and Andy Priaulx driving. There was some initial success, and in 2003 newcomer Matt Neal finished third in the standings for them, in what was Arena's best year in the BTCC with six wins and finishing second in the Teams' and Manufacturers' Championships. However Honda chose to reduce their support, leaving Arena running a single car for Tom Chilton in 2004 and claim two wins. Honda's support was gone altogether in 2005 but despite missing the opening and closing meetings of the year Chilton went on to take four wins in the campaign before they decided to sell off their Civic to Fast-Tec Motorsport, although Arena provided some assistance with setting up the car. Arena then moved on to a full-time sports car team.

=== Team Aon Ford Focus (2009–2011) ===
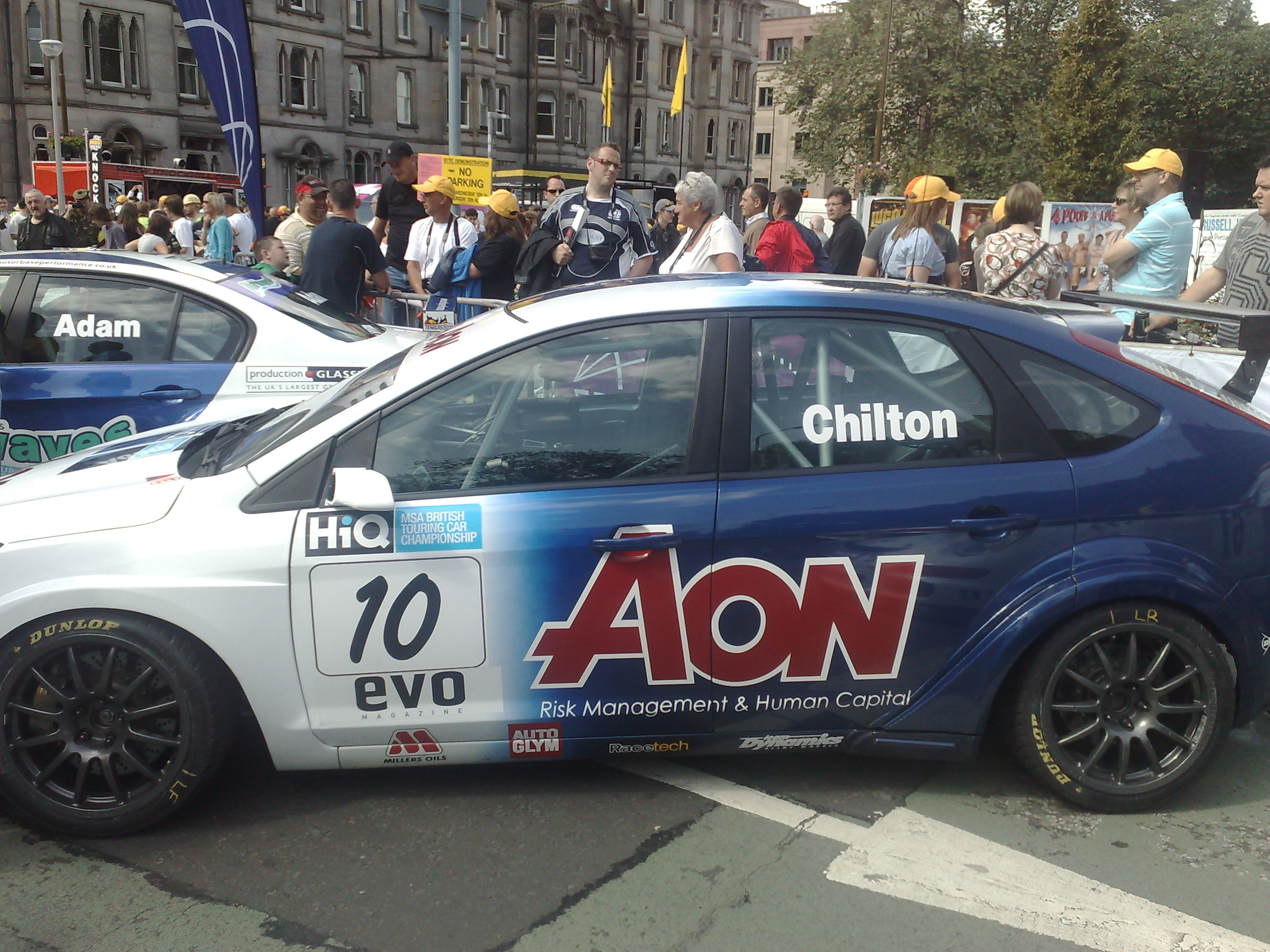
Arena-run Ford Focus at the 2009 BTCC Festival in Edinburgh.

On 25 November 2008, Arena Motorsport announced it would be running a pair of Ford Focus STs for the 2009 season. The team's lead driver was Tom Chilton along with Alan Morrison also returning, running under the Team Aon banner (Aon Corporation being their primary sponsor). Morrison left the team during the season and was replaced in certain rounds by Tom Onslow-Cole. The team struggled with the car at the beginning of the season, but were on the pace at the end of the year. For 2010, the cars will run under LPG-power from Calor, with Chilton and Onslow-Cole continuing as drivers. They saw a massive leap in performance. Winning 7 races & securing 4th & 5th in the drivers championship & 2nd in the teams championship.

British Touring Car Championship results
Year	Car	Drivers	Wins	Poles	Fast laps	Points	D.C.	T.C.
1999	Renault Laguna	(United Kingdom) Russell Spence				3	18th	8th
1999	Renault Laguna	(United Kingdom) Will Hoy				15	15th	8th
2002	Honda Civic Type-R with Honda Racing	(United Kingdom) Andy Priaulx	1	3	1	116	5th	4th
2002	Honda Civic Type-R with Honda Racing	(United Kingdom) Alan Morrison	1		1	68	9th	4th
2003	Honda Civic Type-R with Honda Racing	(United Kingdom) Matt Neal	6	2	5	148	3rd	2nd
2003	Honda Civic Type-R with Honda Racing	(United Kingdom) Alan Morrison		1	2	125	5th	2nd
2003	Honda Civic Type-R with Honda Racing	(United Kingdom) Tom Chilton				70	9th	2nd
2004	Honda Civic Type-R with Team Honda	(United Kingdom) Tom Chilton	2			116	9th	5th
2005	Honda Civic Type-R	(United Kingdom) Tom Chilton	3			175	5th	5th
2009	Ford Focus ST with Team Aon	(United Kingdom) Tom Chilton		1		55	13th	9th
2009	Ford Focus ST with Team Aon	(United Kingdom) Tom Onslow-Cole				4	21st	9th
2009	Ford Focus ST with Team Aon	(United Kingdom) Alan Morrison				2	24th	9th
2010	Ford Focus ST LPG with Team Aon and Calor	(United Kingdom) Tom Onslow-Cole	4	4	4	200	4th	2nd
2010	Ford Focus ST LPG with Team Aon and Calor	(United Kingdom) Tom Chilton	3	5	2	191	5th	2nd
2011	Ford Focus ST with Team Aon	(United Kingdom) Tom Chilton	2	1	1	135	7th	4th
2011	Ford Focus ST with Team Aon	(United Kingdom) Tom Onslow-Cole				61	13th	4th
2011	Ford Focus ST with Team Aon	(United Kingdom) Andy Neate				15	18th	4th

- D.C. = Drivers' Championship position, T.C. = Teams' Championship position.

== WTCC ==
The team switched to the World Touring Car Championship for 2012, with Tom Chilton and James Nash driving. The season was unsuccessful, with the car struggling for pace during the majority of the season.

This season would turn out to be the team's last, as during the final weeks of 2012, the team was formally closed.

== Sports car racing ==
In 2001, Arena ran the Gulf branded Audi R8 in the European Le Mans Series and at Le Mans for Johansson Racing. The drivers Stefan Johansson, Patrick Lemarié and Tom Coronel were unsuccessful at Le Mans but the team did win the European Le Mans Series championship that year.

In 2003, Arena chose to enter sports car racing, being chosen to represent Audi Sport UK. The team would run an Audi R8 at the 12 Hours of Sebring and 24 Hours of Le Mans. A driving team of Mika Salo, Jonny Kane, and Perry McCarthy were able to take sixth place at Sebring, but the team's fortune at Le Mans turned sour as Frank Biela mistakenly missed his pit stop and ran out of fuel early in the race.

For 2004, Arena initially planned to run a privateer Dome prototype at Le Mans, but the plan did not come together and their entry was withdrawn. A second attempt in 2005 with a new Zytek also did not occur. Finally, in 2007, Arena was able to purchase a Zytek 07S, with plans to enter the full Le Mans Series season as the factory squad in LMP1 with Tom Chilton and Hayanari Shimoda.

Arena's 2007 effort would suffer mechanical setbacks early, with the team struggling to finish races due to throttle cable linkage failures. The team was also forced to withdraw from Le Mans when a heavy accident during testing damage the car so badly that repairs could not be completed in the two weeks prior to the race. Arena was however able to finish in eighth place at the Nürburgring, earning them their first points of the season.

Le Mans Series results
Year	Class	Car	Drivers	Wins	Poles	Fast laps	Points	T.C.
2007	LMP1	Zytek 07S-Zytek 2ZG408 4.0L V8	(United Kingdom) Tom Chilton (United Kingdom) Max Chilton (Japan) Hayanari Shimoda	0			8	8th*

24 Hours of Le Mans results
Year	Class	No	Tyres	Car	Drivers	Pole	Fast lap	Laps	Pos.	Class Pos.
2003	LMP900	52	M	Audi R8-Audi 3.6L Turbo V8 with (United Kingdom) Audi Sport UK	(Germany) Frank Biela (United Kingdom) Perry McCarthy (Finland) Mika Salo	no	no	28 (DNF)	46th	15th

12 Hours of Sebring results
Year	Class	No	Tyres	Car	Drivers	Pole	Fast lap	Laps	Pos.	Class Pos.
2003	LMP900	9	M	Audi R8-Audi 3.6L Turbo V8 with (United Kingdom) Audi Sport UK	(Finland) Mika Salo (United Kingdom) Jonny Kane (United Kingdom) Perry McCarthy	351	no	no	6th	4th

European Le Mans Series results
Year	Class	Car	Drivers	Wins	Poles	Fast laps	Points	T.C.
2001	LMP900	Audi R8-Audi 3.6L Turbo V8 with (United Kingdom) Johansson Motorsport	(Sweden) Stefan Johansson (United Kingdom) Guy Smith	1	2	2	115	1st

- T.C. = Teams' Championship position.

== Formulas ==
In 2006–07, Arena joined the young A1 Grand Prix series managing both A1 Team India and A1 Team Greece but this last one didn't race all season.

Arena were involved in 2007 in British Formula 3 Championship with Max Chilton without success.

British Formula 3 Championship Results
Year	Car	Drivers	Wins	Poles	Fast laps	Points	D.C.	T.C.
2007	Dallara F307-Mecachrome	(United Kingdom) Max Chilton	0	0	0	0	NC	NC

A1 Grand Prix results
Year	Car	Team	Wins	Races	Poles	Fast laps	Points	T.C.
2006–07	Lola A1GP-Zytek	A1 Team India	0	22	0	0	13	16th
2006–07	Lola A1GP-Zytek	A1 Team Greece	0	22	0	0	0	24th
2007–08	Lola A1GP-Zytek	A1 Team India	2	20	1	0	61	10th

- D.C. = Drivers' Championship position, T.C. = Teams' Championship position.
