= Vic Lee Racing =

British motor racing team

(United Kingdom) Vic Lee Racing
- Founded: 1980s
- Folded: 2004
- Team principal(s): Vic Lee
- Former series: British Touring Car Championship; British GT Championship

Vic Lee Racing (VLR), formerly Vic Lee Motorsport (VLM) was a UK auto racing team, most famous for running BMWs and Peugeots in the British Touring Car Championship, and most infamous for the drug-related convictions of its owner Victor "Vic" Lee.

== History ==
=== As Vic Lee Motorsport (1990-1992) ===
Vic Lee Motorsport was based in Springhead Enterprise Park in Northfleet, Kent, from where a number of cars were prepared including the BTCC BMW cars. The team had considerable success in the early 1990s: in 1990 Jeff Allam won his class in a VLM prepared BMW M3, 1991 saw Will Hoy take the BTCC title in a similar car, and Tim Harvey won the championship for the team in a BMW 318is. During the 1992 season, following the switch to the new car, Vic Lee Motorsport would continue to prepare the older BMW M3 cars for privateer entrants such as future multiple champion Matthew Neal, who drove Hoy's title winning 1991 car under his father Steve Neal's 'Rimstock' banner.

However, the company was liquidated when Lee and others were convicted of importing drugs hidden in their race transporters worth £6 million, suspicions having been raised due to the number of times the team found it necessary to test at the Zandvoort circuit in the Netherlands. Lee received a sentence of twelve years' imprisonment in 1993.

The team was liquidated, and some of the assets sold went to the team's driver Ray Bellm and Steve Neal, who together formed Team Dynamics.

=== As Vic Lee Racing (2000-2003) ===
After being released on parole in 1998 to work for Team Dynamics, Vic shortly took over the Bowman Motorsport team, and restarted the team as 'VLR' (Vic Lee Racing) by running a programme in the National Saloon Car Championship. The team was given its own space at Peugeot's Stoke Heath factory; the relationship also meant that the team also designed, built, and developed rally cars for the British iteration of the Peugeot 206 Cup, a one-make rally championship. For the 2000 BTCC season they ran a joint campaign in the NSC and BTCC Class B last season, winning both with Peugeot 306s driven by Toni Ruokonen and Alan Morrison respectively.

On the strength of these results Peugeot enlisted VLR to run their works entry in the new-look BTCC for 2001. VLR signed Dan Eaves, former VLM driver Steve Soper and Matt Neal to drive the bright yellow Peugeot 406 coupés, but sponsorship difficulties meant Neal was released from his contract after only two rounds. In addition, former Superbike racer Aaron Slight drove an extra car for one race weekend mid-season. The dominance of Vauxhall in 2001 meant that the team were not as successful as Peugeot hoped, resulting in the withdrawal of works backing.

However, despite rumours linking the team to running Lexus cars for 2002, they continued with the 406s under the guise of "Team Halfords" having landed substantial backing from the company. Eaves remained with the team, and was joined by 1992 champion Tim Harvey, Soper having retired after a career-ending crash at the final round of the 2001 season. Midway through the season they were joined by single-seater refugee Carl Breeze, and by the year's end Eaves had claimed 1st in the Independent's championship, with the team a creditable 5th overall.

For 2003 VLR switched to a Peugeot 307 with Eaves and Breeze, however the car was not as competitive and Breeze jumped ship to GA Motorsports with Clio ace Danny Buxton taking his place. Despite lodging an entry for the 2004 season, nothing materialised, leading to Eaves taking Halfords sponsorship to Team Dynamics at the last minute.

In 2005 Lee was again charged with two others and convicted of drug trafficking offences, when £1.7 million worth of class A drugs was discovered in the boot of his car, in which he received again twelve years imprisonment.

Lee was released in 2010 and later became a managing director of Corbeau, a manufacturer of aftermarket seating for motor vehicles.
