= Gary Ayles =

British racing driver (born 1964)

- Nationality: (United Kingdom) British
- Born: 25 September 1964 (age 62) Robertsbridge, East Sussex, England

British Touring Car Championship
- Years active: 1988–1989, 1991–1992, 1996
- Teams: Andy Rouse Engineering; Arquati Racing Team; Peugeot Italia Team
- Starts: 36
- Wins: 0
- Poles: 0
- Fastest laps: 1
- Best finish: 14th in 1991

Gary Patrick Ayles (born 25 September 1964) is a British racing driver.

Ayles raced in the British F3 championship in the late 1980s before making the switch to touring car racing. He competed in the British Touring Car Championship in 1991 driving for Toyota alongside Andy Rouse, and filled in for one race in 1992. He was offered a drive with the factory Peugeot team in the Superturismo series as teammate to Fabrizio Giovanardi. In his three years with the team, he finished runner up in the championship in 1992 to the Italian and scored several wins during his time in the series against such names as Gabriele Tarquini, Roberto Ravaglia and Emanuele Pirro. For 1995, he drove for the factory-backed Ferrari Club Italia team in the 1995 BPR Global GT Series, driving a Ferrari F40.

Ayles returned to the BTCC in 1996, again driving for Andy Rouse in a Nissan, but did not enjoy the same success. In 1997, he raced a McLaren F1 GTR in the 1997 FIA GT Championship for Parabolica Motorsport. The team achieved a brace of top six finishes against the factory teams, regularly the top privateers. This car is replicated within the video game Project CARS 3. The year also included a one-off outing at Silverstone in the 1997 British GT Championship, where he took the overall victory. He has entered the Le Mans 24hr four times with a best finish of ninth in the LMGT1 class and 18th overall at the 1995 24 Hours of Le Mans driving a Ferrari F40.

Ayles became a team owner in 2000, when he established GA Motorsport, which has entered cars in the BTCC since 2000, racing as Team Sureterm for much of 2004. At the beginning of 2005, Ayles sold his share in the team to Mike Thompson, which Thompson since rebranded as Quest Racing. After planning to enter a new team in 2006, he formed the A-Tech team, which entered the BTCC for 2007, with a pair of Alfa Romeos for David Pinkney and Richard Marsh. Currently (2011) he is involved with Lotus UK's GT4 race programme with the Evora.

Ayles co-owns a heritage vehicle shipping and delivery company, Bespoke Handling.

== Racing record ==
=== Complete British Touring Car Championship results ===
(key) (Races in bold indicate pole position - 1 point awarded all in 1996 only) (Races in italics indicate fastest lap - 1 point awarded 1988–1989 in class)

Year	Team	Car	Class	1	2	3	4	5	6	7	8	9	10	11	12	13	14	15	16	17	18	19	20	21	22	23	24	25	26	DC	Pts	Class
1988	ICS plc	Ford Sierra RS500	A	SIL	OUL	THR	DON ovr:10‡ cls:8‡	THR	SIL	SIL	BRH	SNE	BRH	BIR	DON	SIL														**62nd**	**0**	**25th**
1989	Arquati Racing Team	Ford Sierra RS500	A	OUL	SIL	THR	DON; Ret‡	THR	SIL	SIL	BRH	SNE	BRH	BIR	DON	SIL														**NC**	**0**	**NC**
1991	Kaliber ICS Team Toyota	Toyota Carina		SIL; 9	SNE; DSQ	DON; 4	THR; Ret	SIL; 8^{1}	BRH; Ret	SIL; Ret	DON; 1 Ret	DON; 2 DNS	OUL; Ret	BRH; 1; 3	BRH; 2 DNS	DON; 14	THR; Ret	SIL; 10												**14th**	**19**	
1992	Peugeot Italia Team	Peugeot 405 Mi16		SIL	THR	OUL	SNE	BRH	DON; 1	DON; 2	SIL	KNO; 1	KNO; 2	PEM	BRH; 1	BRH; 2	DON; 7	SIL												**19th**	**4**	
1996	Rouse Sport	Nissan Primera eGT		DON; 1 Ret	DON; 2; 11	BRH; 1; 11	BRH; 2; 13	THR; 1 DNS	THR; 2 DNS	SIL; 1; 15	SIL; 2; 12	OUL; 1; 12	OUL; 2; 12	SNE; 1; 10	SNE; 2; 14	BRH; 1 Ret	BRH; 2; 10	SIL; 1; 13	SIL; 2; 15	KNO; 1 Ret	KNO; 2 DNS	OUL; 1	OUL; 2	THR; 1; 11	THR; 2; 13	DON; 1; 11	DON; 2 Ret	BRH; 1 DNS	BRH; 2; 12	**21st**	**2**	

1. – Race was stopped due to heavy rain. No points were awarded.

‡ Endurance driver.

=== Complete Italian Touring Car Championship results ===
Year	Team	Car	Class	1	2	3	4	5	6	7	8	9	10	11	12	13	14	15	16	17	18	19	20	DC	Pts
1992	Peugeot Talbot Sport	Peugeot 405	S2	MNZ; 1; 3	MNZ; 2 Ret	MAG; 1 Ret	MAG; 2; 8	MUG; 1; 3	MUG; 2 Ret	BIN; 1; 3	BIN; 2; 3	VAL; 1 Ret	VAL; 2; 3	IMO; 1; 3	IMO; 2; 3	MIS; 1; 4	MIS; 2; 2	PER; 1; 2	PER; 2; 2	VAR; 1; 2	VAR; 2; 1	MNZ; 1; 2	MNZ; 2 Ret	2nd	192
1993	Peugeot Talbot Sport	Peugeot 405		MNZ; 1; 4	MNZ; 2; 3	VAL; 1; 3	VAL; 2; 3	MIS; 1; 9	MIS; 2; 1	MAG; 1; 8	MAG; 2; 6	BIN; 1; 4	BIN; 2; 4	IMO; 1; 4	IMO; 2; 5	VAR; 1; 5	VAR; 2; 5	MIS; 1; 2	MIS; 2 Ret	PER; 1; 4	PER; 2; 3	MUG; 1; 3	MUG; 2 Ret	4th	186
1994	Peugeot Talbot Sport	Peugeot 405 Mi 16		MNZ; 1; 6	MNZ; 2; 12	VAL; 1; 6	VAL; 2; 9	MAG; 1; 10	MAG; 2; 9	BIN; 1; 10	BIN; 2 Ret	MIS; 1; 8	MIS; 2 Ret	VAL; 1; 8	VAL; 2; 8	MUG; 1; 10	MUG; 2 DSQ	PER; 1	PER; 2	VAR; 1 Ret	VAR; 2; 14	MUG; 1 DNS	MUG; 2; 11	14th	28
