= 2003 SEAT Cupra Championship =

British motor race season

Seasons
- ← none 2004 →

The 2003 SEAT Cupra Championship season was the inaugural running of the one-make championship. The championship consisted of ten rounds at five meetings held in England, beginning on 4 May at Croft, and finishing at Thruxton on 17 August. The championship winner was rewarded with a drive in the British Touring Car Championship for the SEAT Sport UK team. Robert Huff would eventually win the championship, holding off both Gordon Shedden and Stefan Hodgetts, as those three drivers shared nine of the ten race victories between them. Huff would go on to finish seventh in the 2004 British Touring Car Championship with his prize-winning drive.

== Teams and drivers ==
All entries ran the Mk1 SEAT León entered by SEAT themselves.

| No. | Drivers | Rounds |
|---|---|---|
| 3 | (United Kingdom) Stefan Hodgetts | All |
| 4 | (United Kingdom) Karl Goshawk | All |
| 5 | (Scotland) Charles Stewart | All |
| 6 | (United Kingdom) Natalie Barratt | All |
| 7 | (Republic of Ireland) Emmet O'Brien | All |
| 9 | (United Kingdom) James Pickford | All |
| 10 | (United Kingdom) Spencer Marsh | All |
| 11 | (United Kingdom) Hamish Gordon | All |
| 12 | (United Kingdom) Robert Huff | All |
| 14 | (United Kingdom) Paula Cook | All |
| 15 | (United Kingdom) Stephen Colbert | All |
| 16 | (United Kingdom) Andre D'Cruze | All |
| 17 | (United Kingdom) Ben Winrow | 1-4 |
| 20 | (United Kingdom) Julian Westwood | All |
| 21 | (United Kingdom) Craig Murray | 1-2 |
| 22 | (United Kingdom) Gordon Shedden | All |
| 23 | (Republic of Ireland) Gavin Smith | All |

== Calendar ==
| Round | Track | Date | Pole position | Fastest lap | Winner |
|---|---|---|---|---|---|
| 1 | Croft | 4 May | (United Kingdom) Stefan Hodgetts | (Republic of Ireland) Gavin Smith | (United Kingdom) Stefan Hodgetts |
| 2 | Croft | 4 May | (United Kingdom) Stephen Colbert | (United Kingdom) Robert Huff | (United Kingdom) Robert Huff |
| 3 | Silverstone | 27 May | (United Kingdom) Stefan Hodgetts | (United Kingdom) Robert Huff | (United Kingdom) Stefan Hodgetts |
| 4 | Silverstone | 27 May | (United Kingdom) Stefan Hodgetts | (United Kingdom) Stefan Hodgetts | (United Kingdom) Stefan Hodgetts |
| 5 | Oulton Park | 13 July | (United Kingdom) James Pickford | (United Kingdom) Robert Huff | (United Kingdom) Robert Huff |
| 6 | Oulton Park | 13 July | (United Kingdom) Robert Huff | (United Kingdom) Gordon Shedden | (United Kingdom) Gordon Shedden |
| 7 | Rockingham | 3 August | (United Kingdom) Robert Huff | (United Kingdom) Stefan Hodgetts | (United Kingdom) Stefan Hodgetts |
| 8 | Rockingham | 3 August | (United Kingdom) James Pickford | (Republic of Ireland) Gavin Smith | (Republic of Ireland) Gavin Smith |
| 9 | Thruxton | 17 August | (United Kingdom) James Pickford | (United Kingdom) Stefan Hodgetts | (United Kingdom) Robert Huff |
| 10 | Thruxton | 17 August | (United Kingdom) Stefan Hodgetts | (United Kingdom) Stefan Hodgetts | (United Kingdom) Stefan Hodgetts |

== Championship Standings ==
- Points were awarded as follows:

| Pos | 1 | 2 | 3 | 4 | 5 | 6 | 7 | 8 | 9 | 10 | 11 | 12 | FL |
|---|---|---|---|---|---|---|---|---|---|---|---|---|---|
| Race 1 | 15 | 12 | 10 | 8 | 6 | 5 | 4 | 3 | 2 | 1 | 0 | | 1 |
| Race 2 | 20 | 17 | 15 | 13 | 11 | 9 | 7 | 5 | 4 | 3 | 2 | 1 | 1 |

| Pos | Driver | CRO | | SIL | | OUL | | ROC | | THR | | Pts |
|---|---|---|---|---|---|---|---|---|---|---|---|---|
| 1 | (United Kingdom) Robert Huff | 4 | 1 | 2 | 2 | 1 | 2 | NC | 3 | 1 | Ret | 122 |
| 2 | (United Kingdom) Gordon Shedden | 3 | 3 | 6 | 3 | 6 | 1 | 2 | 7 | DSQ | 2 | 107 |
| 3 | (United Kingdom) Stefan Hodgetts | 1 | 7 | 1 | 1 | Ret | DNS | 1 | 6 | 12 | 1 | 105 |
| 4 | (Republic of Ireland) Gavin Smith | 6 | 2 | 5 | 4 | 14 | 3 | Ret | 1 | 11 | Ret | 78 |
| 5 | (United Kingdom) James Pickford | 7 | 4 | 3 | 5 | 8 | 15 | Ret | 2 | 2 | Ret | 70 |
| 6 | (United Kingdom) Stephen Colbert | 5 | Ret | 4 | 9 | 2 | 4 | Ret | 5 | 13 | 3 | 69 |
| 7 | (United Kingdom) Julian Westwood | 15 | 5 | 8 | 7 | 3 | 6 | Ret | 8 | 3 | 5 | 66 |
| 8 | (United Kingdom) Spencer Marsh | 2 | 9 | 7 | 13 | 4 | 7 | Ret | DNS | Ret | 4 | 48 |
| 9 | (United Kingdom) Andre D'Cruze | 9 | 10 | 10 | 8 | 15 | 8 | 3 | 4 | 10 | 7 | 47 |
| 10 | (Republic of Ireland) Emmet O'Brien | 8 | 6 | 15 | Ret | 5 | 5 | 7 | Ret | 4 | 9 | 45 |
| 11 | (United Kingdom) Paula Cook | Ret | 12 | 12 | Ret | 9 | 9 | 5 | 9 | 5 | 6 | 32 |
| 12 | (United Kingdom) Hamish Gordon | 12 | 14 | 13 | 10 | 10 | 11 | 6 | 10 | 6 | 8 | 24 |
| 13 | (United Kingdom) Karl Goshawk | 13 | 13 | 14 | 11 | 12 | 12 | 4 | 11 | 7 | Ret | 17 |
| 14 | (United Kingdom) Craig Murray | 10 | 8 | 9 | 6 | | | | | | | 17 |
| 15 | (United Kingdom) Ben Winrow | 11 | 11 | 11 | 12 | 7 | 10 | Ret | Ret | | | 10 |
| 16 | (Scotland) Charles Stewart | 16 | 16 | 17 | 15 | 13 | 14 | 8 | 12 | 9 | 11 | 8 |
| 17 | (United Kingdom) Natalie Barratt | 14 | 15 | 16 | 14 | 11 | 13 | Ret | Ret | 8 | 10 | 6 |
| Pos | Driver | CRO | | SIL | | OUL | | ROC | | THU | | Pts |

| Colour | Result |
|---|---|
| Gold | Winner |
| Silver | Second place |
| Bronze | Third place |
| Green | Points classification |
| Blue | Non-points classification |
| Blue | Non-classified finish (NC) |
| Purple | Retired, not classified (Ret) |
| Red | Did not qualify (DNQ) |
| Red | Did not pre-qualify (DNPQ) |
| Black | Disqualified (DSQ) |
| White | Did not start (DNS) |
| White | Withdrew (WD) |
| White | Race cancelled (C) |
| Blank | Did not practice (DNP) |
| Blank | Did not arrive (DNA) |
| Blank | Excluded (EX) |
