= 2000 Formula Renault 2.0 UK Championship =

Motor racing competition

Seasons
- ← 1999 2001 →

The 2000 Formula Renault UK season was the 12th British Formula Renault Championship. The season ended after twelve rounds held in the United Kingdom. 32 drivers competed in this series. All drivers used the Tatuus FR2000 (Renault) car.

Rookie Kimi Räikkönen dominated the season, taking seven wins and finishing on the podium in every race he competed in. This performance led to a surprise move to Formula One with Sauber the following year.

== Teams and drivers ==
Team	No.	Driver name	Rounds
Aztec International	2	(United Kingdom) Carl Breeze	All
Manor Motorsport	3	(Finland) Kimi Räikkönen	1-10
Manor Motorsport	11	(United Kingdom) Danny Watts	1-2, 4-12
Manor Motorsport	12	(United States) Jeffrey Jones	All
Team DFR	6	(United Kingdom) John Dalziel	1-2, 4-12
Team DFR	8	(United Kingdom) Ryan Dalziel	All
Motaworld Racing	15	(United Kingdom) Tom Sisley	All
Motaworld Racing	16	(United Kingdom) Leighton Walker	1-10
Motaworld Racing	33	(United Kingdom) Marc McLoughlin	11-12
Falcon Motorsport	33	(United Kingdom) Marc McLoughlin	1-10
Aztec Race Engineering	77	(United Kingdom) Charles Hall	All
Unknown teams	1	(Republic of Ireland) Michael Keohane	1-7, 9-12
Unknown teams	4	(United Kingdom) Martyn Smith	5-6, 8-12
Unknown teams	5	(United Kingdom) Adam Smith	5-6, 8-12
Unknown teams	7	(United Kingdom) Jeremy Smith	All
Unknown teams	9	(United Kingdom) Richard Lyons	1-2, 5-7
Unknown teams	9	(United Kingdom) Stefan Hodgetts	8-12
Unknown teams	10	(Japan) Keiko Ihara	All
Unknown teams	13	(United Kingdom) Stuart Wood	1-8
Unknown teams	13	(Sweden) Frederic Haglund	9-10, 12
Unknown teams	14	(United Kingdom) Tom Herridge	All
Unknown teams	17	(United Kingdom) James Pickford	All
Unknown teams	18	(United Kingdom) Robin Liddell	1-3
Unknown teams	20	(United Kingdom) Peter Nilsson	1-6
Unknown teams	21	(South Africa) Wesley Grogor	1-7, 9-10
Unknown teams	23	(United Kingdom) Chris Clark	7, 10-12
Unknown teams	24	(Uruguay) Fernando Rama	All
Unknown teams	27	(United Kingdom) Jason Coffin	1-4
Unknown teams	34	(United Kingdom) Dillon Battistini	1-4
Unknown teams	34	(United Kingdom) Alex Kapadia	9-12
Unknown teams	66	(Republic of Ireland) Gavin Smith	All
Unknown teams	78	(United Kingdom) Andre D'Cruze	10
Unknown teams	99	(United States) Vincent Apple	All

== Season summary ==
Round	Circuit	Date	Pole position	Fastest lap	Winning driver	Winning team
1	Brands Hatch	9 April	(United Kingdom) Danny Watts	(Finland) Kimi Räikkönen	(United Kingdom) Danny Watts	Manor Motorsport
2	Donington Park	24 April	(Finland) Kimi Räikkönen	(Finland) Kimi Räikkönen	(Finland) Kimi Räikkönen	Manor Motorsport
3	Thruxton	1 May	(Finland) Kimi Räikkönen	(Finland) Kimi Räikkönen	(Finland) Kimi Räikkönen	Manor Motorsport
4	Knockhill	14 May	(United Kingdom) Tom Sisley	(United Kingdom) Ryan Dalziel	(United Kingdom) Ryan Dalziel	Team DFR
5	Oulton Park	29 May	(Finland) Kimi Räikkönen	(Finland) Kimi Räikkönen	(Finland) Kimi Räikkönen	Manor Motorsport
6	Silverstone	11 June	(United Kingdom) Marc McLoughlin	(United Kingdom) Marc McLoughlin	(United Kingdom) Leighton Walker	Motaworld Racing
7	Croft	25 June	(Finland) Kimi Räikkönen	(United Kingdom) Leighton Walker	(Finland) Kimi Räikkönen	Manor Motorsport
8	Snetterton	8 July	(United Kingdom) Leighton Walker	(Finland) Kimi Räikkönen	(Finland) Kimi Räikkönen	Manor Motorsport
9	Donington Park	30 July	(Finland) Kimi Räikkönen	(Finland) Kimi Räikkönen	(Finland) Kimi Räikkönen	Manor Motorsport
10	Brands Hatch	28 August	(Finland) Kimi Räikkönen	(Finland) Kimi Räikkönen	(Finland) Kimi Räikkönen	Manor Motorsport
11	Oulton Park	10 September	(United Kingdom) Marc McLoughlin	(United Kingdom) John Dalziel	(United Kingdom) John Dalziel	Team DFR
12	Silverstone	16 September	(United Kingdom) Marc McLoughlin	(United Kingdom) Marc McLoughlin	(United Kingdom) Charles Hall	Aztec Race Engineering

== Results and standings ==
- Points were awarded to the top 20 classified finishers, with 2 points for fastest lap.

Position	1st	2nd	3rd	4th	5th	6th	7th	8th	9th	10th	11th	12th	13th	14th	15th	16th	17th	18th	19th	20th	FL
Points	32	28	25	22	20	18	16	14	12	11	10	9	8	7	6	5	4	3	2	1	2

=== Drivers' championship ===
Pos.	Driver	BRH	DON	THR	KNO	OUL	SIL	CRO	SNE	DON	BRH	OUL	SIL	Points
1	(Finland) Kimi Räikkönen	3	1	1	2	1	3	1	1	1	1			316
2	(United Kingdom) Ryan Dalziel	5	2	2	1	Ret	2	3	7	6	4	3	7	260
3	(United Kingdom) Tom Sisley	9	9	6	3	3	4	5	3	2	6	2	6	227
4	(United Kingdom) John Dalziel	11	6		Ret	2	5	2	17	7	7	1	3	199
5	(United Kingdom) Carl Breeze	4	4	4	4	5	7	9	11	10	Ret	6	5	195
6	(United Kingdom) Charles Hall	Ret	5	5	6	6	Ret	7	4	3	Ret	5	1	191
7	(United Kingdom) Marc McLoughlin	6	8	Ret	7	4	9	6	9	4	3	Ret	2	191
8	(United Kingdom) Leighton Walker	2	7	3	5	9	1	10	2	8	Ret			190
9	(United States) Jeffrey Jones	7	10	7	9	Ret	8	8	6	5	5	4	8	177
10	(United Kingdom) Danny Watts	1	3		Ret	Ret	Ret	4	5	Ret	2	17	4	153
11	(United Kingdom) James Pickford	Ret	11	8	8	13	12	11	10	Ret	8	9	11	112
12	(United States) Vincent Apple	13	Ret	18	16	Ret	21	16	8	9	11	8	9	83
13	(Republic of Ireland) Gavin Smith	10	Ret	9	Ret	8	13	Ret	15	13	13	10	18	81
14	(United Kingdom) Tom Herridge	15	12	16	10	Ret	14	Ret	13	11	Ret	11	16	71
15	(Republic of Ireland) Michael Keohane	Ret	13	10	15	Ret	11	13		Ret	Ret	18	12	55
16	(United Kingdom) Stuart Wood	16	15	14	12	17	10	18	12					54
17	(United Kingdom) Jeremy Smith	Ret	18	17	11	14	16	17	18	16	16	15	19	54
18	(United Kingdom) Richard Lyons	Ret	Ret			7	6	12						43
19	(United Kingdom) Stefan Hodgetts								14	Ret	10	7	13	42
20	(Japan) Keiko Ihara	18	19	19	14	18	18	14	20	Ret	15	Ret	17	38
21	(United Kingdom) Martyn Smith					10	Ret		16	Ret	9	Ret	14	35
22	(Uruguay) Fernando Rama	17	Ret	Ret	13	15	20	19	21	15	18	16	Ret	35
23	(United Kingdom) Adam Smith					16	15		19	Ret	17	12	15	32
24	(United Kingdom) Robin Liddell	8	17	12										27
25	(South Africa) Wesley Grogor	Ret	14	Ret	Ret	12	17	Ret		14	Ret			27
26	(United Kingdom) Peter Nilsson	Ret	16	15	Ret	11	19							23
27	(United Kingdom) Chris Clark							15			12	13	Ret	23
28	(United Kingdom) Dillon Battistini	12	Ret	11	Ret									19
29	(United Kingdom) Alex Kapadia									12	Ret	14	Ret	16
30	(United Kingdom) Jason Coffin	14	Ret	13	Ret									15
31	(Sweden) Fredric Haglund									Ret	Ret		10	11
32	(United Kingdom) Andre D'Cruze										14			7
Pos.	Driver	BRH	DON	THR	KNO	OUL	SIL	CRO	SNE	DON	BRH	OUL	SIL	Points
