= 2004 SEAT Cupra Championship =

British motor race season

The 2004 SEAT Cupra Championship season was the second season of the SEAT Cupra Championship in car racing. It began on 24 April at Brands Hatch, and ended on 28 August at Donington Park, after twelve rounds held in England and Scotland. The championship was won by James Pickford, after he had finished fifth in the championship's inaugural season. He held off a late-season charge from Oli Wilkinson to win the championship by just five points, with ex-British Touring Car Championship driver Tom Boardman coming in third. Pickford's prize for winning the championship was to replace Robert Huff in the SEAT Sport UK team in the BTCC for the 2005 season. Pickford finished eighth in the championship, with a best result of second, three times.

== Teams and drivers ==
All entries ran the Mk1 SEAT León entered by SEAT themselves.

No.	Drivers	Rounds
2	(United Kingdom) Gordon Shedden	All
3	(United Kingdom) Andy Neate	1-3
4	(United Kingdom) Simon Hepplewhite	All
5	(United Kingdom) Melanie Healey	All
6	(United Kingdom) James Pickford	All
7	(United Kingdom) Tom Boardman	All
8	(United Kingdom) Lewis Carter	All
9	(United Kingdom) Lorcan Johnson	1-4
10	(United Kingdom) Oli Wilkinson	All
11	(United States) Emmanuel Crouvisier	All
12	(United Kingdom) Daniel-Lee Stevens	All
14	(Portugal) Rui Chagas	1-5
17	(United Kingdom) Ben Winrow	All
18	(United Kingdom) Rob Austin	1-3
19	(Republic of Ireland) Emmet O'Brien	All
20	(Republic of Ireland) Gavin Smith	All
21	(United Kingdom) Spencer Marsh	1-3
22	(United Kingdom) Jon Lanceley	1-3

== Calendar ==
Round	Track	Date	Pole position	Fastest lap	Winner
1	Brands Hatch	24 April	(United Kingdom) James Pickford	(United Kingdom) James Pickford	(United Kingdom) James Pickford
2	Brands Hatch	24 April	(United Kingdom) James Pickford	(United Kingdom) James Pickford	(Republic of Ireland) Gavin Smith
3	Silverstone	9 May	(United Kingdom) Oli Wilkinson	(United Kingdom) James Pickford	(United Kingdom) Tom Boardman
4	Silverstone	9 May	(United Kingdom) Lewis Carter	(United Kingdom) James Pickford	(Republic of Ireland) Gavin Smith
5	Oulton Park	25 May	(United Kingdom) James Pickford	(United Kingdom) Tom Boardman	(United Kingdom) James Pickford
6	Oulton Park	25 May	(United Kingdom) Lewis Carter	(Republic of Ireland) Gavin Smith	(Republic of Ireland) Gavin Smith
7	Croft	25 July	(United Kingdom) James Pickford	(United Kingdom) James Pickford	(United Kingdom) Tom Boardman
8	Croft	25 July	(United Kingdom) James Pickford	(United Kingdom) James Pickford	(United Kingdom) James Pickford
9	Knockhill	8 August	(United Kingdom) James Pickford	(United Kingdom) Gordon Shedden	(United Kingdom) Gordon Shedden
10	Knockhill	8 August	(United Kingdom) Oli Wilkinson	(Republic of Ireland) Gavin Smith	(United Kingdom) Oli Wilkinson
11	Donington Park	28 August	(United Kingdom) Oli Wilkinson	(United Kingdom) Tom Boardman	(United Kingdom) Tom Boardman
12	Donington Park	28 August	(United Kingdom) Gordon Shedden	(United Kingdom) Oli Wilkinson	(United Kingdom) Oli Wilkinson

== Championship Standings ==
- Points were awarded as follows:

Pos	1	2	3	4	5	6	7	8	9	10	11	12
Race 1	15	12	10	8	6	5	4	3	2	1	0	
Race 2	20	17	15	13	11	9	7	5	4	3	2	1

Pos	Driver	BRH		SIL		OUL		CRO		KNO		DON		Pts
1	(United Kingdom) James Pickford	1	12	3	3	1	3	2	1	3	2	4	4	157
2	(United Kingdom) Oli Wilkinson	3	4	2	5	7	7	3	3	2	1	2	1	147
3	(United Kingdom) Tom Boardman	7	3	1	2	2	2	1	8	7	5	1	10	135
4	(United Kingdom) Gordon Shedden	4	2	4	4	3	6	6	5	1	Ret	3	2	124
5	(Republic of Ireland) Gavin Smith	2	1	11	1	5	1	8	Ret	4	6	Ret	Ret	100
6	(United Kingdom) Lewis Carter	Ret	4	6	7	4	5	5	2	Ret	9	5	3	90
7	(Republic of Ireland) Emmet O'Brien	10	8	14	Ret	9	Ret	4	6	5	3	Ret	5	57
8	(Portugal) Rui Chagas	6	9	8	8	Ret	8	7	4	6	7			51
9	(United Kingdom) Ben Winrow	9	7	7	Ret	10	Ret	10	7	9	4	9	Ret	39
10	(United States) Emmanuel Crouvisier	11	11	10	10	8	Ret	9	9	8	8	6	8	33
11	(United Kingdom) Rob Austin	5	Ret	9	Ret	11	4							21
12	(United Kingdom) Spencer Marsh	8	6	12	6	DNS	DNS							21
13	(United Kingdom) Daniel-Lee Stevens	12	Ret	DNS	DNS	6	Ret	Ret	Ret	11	Ret	7	6	18
14	(United Kingdom) Simon Hepplewhite	15	10	13	12	Ret	Ret	11	10	Ret	Ret	8	7	17
15	(United Kingdom) Melanie Healey	14	14	16	14	13	10	13	Ret	10	10	10	9	12
16	(United Kingdom) Jon Lanceley	Ret	DNS	5	11	DNS	DNS							8
17	(United Kingdom) Andy Neate	Ret	DNS	15	9	Ret	9							8
18	(United Kingdom) Lorcan Johnson	13	13	17	13	12	Ret	12	11					2
Pos	Driver	BRH		SIL		OUL		CRO		KNO		DON		Pts

Colour	Result
Gold	Winner
Silver	Second place
Bronze	Third place
Green	Points classification
Blue	Non-points classification
Blue	Non-classified finish (NC)
Purple	Retired, not classified (Ret)
Red	Did not qualify (DNQ)
Red	Did not pre-qualify (DNPQ)
Black	Disqualified (DSQ)
White	Did not start (DNS)
White	Withdrew (WD)
White	Race cancelled (C)
Blank	Did not practice (DNP)
Blank	Did not arrive (DNA)
Blank	Excluded (EX)
