= Beth Walker =

Beth Walker may refer to:

- Beth Walker (judge), Justice of the West Virginia Supreme Court of Appeals
- Beth A. Walker, Dean of the Colorado State University College of Business
- Beth Walker in 2010 Trofeo Abarth 500 GB season
- Beth Walker, fictional character played by Amy Madigan

== See also ==
- Elizabeth Walker (disambiguation)
