= Elizabeth Walker =

Elizabeth Walker (or variants) may refer to:

== Entertainers ==
- Betty Walker (1928–1982), Jewish-American comic and actress
- Tippy Walker (born 1947), née Elizabeth Tipton Walker, American actress
- Helen Roberts (1912–2010), aka Betty Walker, English singer and actress

== Politicians ==
- Liz Walker (politician)
- Liz Walker, political candidate for Newton—North Delta

== Sports ==
- Elisabeth Walker-Young, or Elisabeth Walker, Canadian Paralympic swimmer
- Elizabeth Walker (sailor) who represented Bermuda at the 1995 Pan American Games

== Others ==
- Elizabeth Walker, corps de ballet at New York City Ballet
- Elizabeth Neff Walker (born 1944), American author of romance novels
- Elizabeth Harrison Walker (1897–1955), American lawyer and publisher
- Liz Walker (journalist), on WBZ-TV
- Elizabeth Walker (artist) (1800–1876), British engraver and portrait-painter
- Elizabeth Walker (pharmacist) (1623–1690), British druggist
- Elizabeth A. Walker, American diabetes nurse scientist

== See also ==
- Elizabeth Pupo-Walker, percussionist with Tuatara
- Beth Walker (disambiguation)
- Eliza Walker (disambiguation)
- Lisa Walker (disambiguation)
- Walker (surname)
