= 2002 British Formula Three Championship =

Automobile racing competition in United Kingdom in 2002

2002 British Formula 3 International Series

Seasons
- ← 2001 2003 →

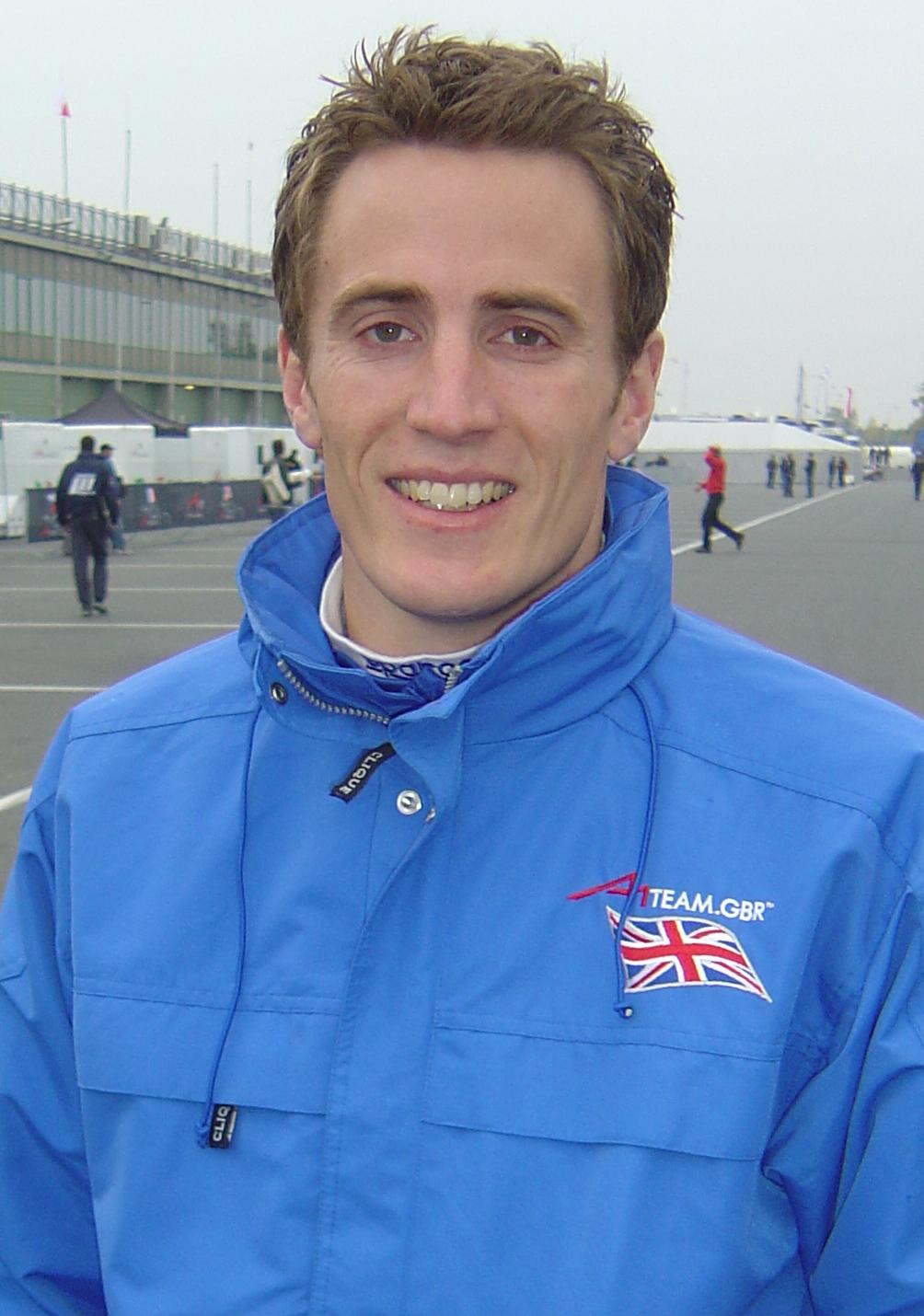
2002 champion, Robbie Kerr

The 2002 British Formula Three season was the 52nd British Formula Three Championship season. It commenced on 31st March and ended on 22 September, after twenty-six races.

The scoring system was 20-15-12-10-8-6-4-3-2-1 points awarded to the first ten finishers, with one extra point added to the driver who set the fastest lap of the race. All results counted towards the driver's final tally.

If a Class B driver finished in the top 10 overall, they did not score points for the main championship; the points were awarded to the next placed driver in the main class. Similarly, if a Class B driver set the fastest lap of the race, they did not receive the extra point for the main championship; the extra point was awarded to the driver in the main class who set the fastest lap.

== Drivers and teams ==
The following teams and drivers were competitors in the 2002 season. The Scholarship class is for older Formula Three cars.

Team	Chassis	Engine	No	Driver	Rounds
Championship Class
(United Kingdom) Carlin Motorsport	Dallara F302	Mugen-Honda	1	(Australia) James Courtney	1-8, 10-13
(United Kingdom) Carlin Motorsport	Dallara F302	Mugen-Honda	1	(United Kingdom) Derek Hayes	9
(United Kingdom) Carlin Motorsport	Dallara F302	Mugen-Honda	2	(South Africa) Alan van der Merwe	All
(United Kingdom) Carlin Motorsport	Dallara F302	Mugen-Honda	21	(Republic of Ireland) Michael Keohane	1-10, 12-13
(United Kingdom) Carlin Motorsport	Dallara F302	Mugen-Honda	22	(Japan) Shinya Hosokawa	All
(United Kingdom) Manor Motorsport	Dallara F302	Mugen-Honda	3	(United Kingdom) Mark Taylor	1-12
(United Kingdom) Manor Motorsport	Dallara F302	Mugen-Honda	4	(United States) Richard Antinucci	All
(United Kingdom) Manor Motorsport	Dallara F302	Mugen-Honda	34	(Denmark) Ronnie Bremer	All
(United Kingdom) Fortec Motorsport	Dallara F302	Renault Sodemo	5	(Brazil) Fabio Carbone	All
(United Kingdom) Fortec Motorsport	Dallara F302	Renault Sodemo	6	(Finland) Heikki Kovalainen	All
(United Kingdom) Alan Docking Racing	Dallara F302	Mugen-Honda	7	(United Kingdom) Robbie Kerr	All
(United Kingdom) Alan Docking Racing	Dallara F302	Mugen-Honda	8	(United Kingdom) Mark Mayall	All
(United Kingdom) Alan Docking Racing	Dallara F302	Mugen-Honda	13	(United Kingdom) Tor Graves	All
(United Kingdom) Team Avanti	Ralt F302	Mugen-Honda	9	(France) James Andanson	7-8
(United Kingdom) Team Avanti	Ralt F302	Mugen-Honda	9	(Netherlands) Jeroen Bleekemolen	9
(United Kingdom) Team Avanti	Ralt F302	Mugen-Honda	9	(United Kingdom) Matthew Gilmore	1-2
(United Kingdom) Team Avanti	Dallara F302	Mugen-Honda	9	(United Kingdom) Matthew Gilmore	3-4
(United Kingdom) Team Avanti	Dallara F302	Mugen-Honda	10	(Italy) Stefano Fabi	All
(United Kingdom) Promatecme UK	Dallara F302	Mugen-Honda	11	(France) Bruce Jouanny	All
(United Kingdom) Promatecme UK	Dallara F302	Mugen-Honda	12	(Brazil) Ernani Judice	1-4
(United Kingdom) Promatecme UK	Dallara F302	Mugen-Honda	12	(United Kingdom) Matthew Gilmore	5-13
(United Kingdom) Duma Racing	Dallara F302	Mugen-Honda	14	(Sweden) Robert Dahlgren	1, 4
(United Kingdom) Duma Racing	Dallara F302	Mugen-Honda	14	(Greece) John Antoniadis	10-13
(Switzerland) Menu Motorsport	Dallara F302	Opel Spiess	16	(United Kingdom) Rob Austin	All
(Switzerland) Menu Motorsport	Dallara F302	Opel Spiess	17	(Colombia) Giandomenico Brusatin	1-8
(Switzerland) Menu Motorsport	Dallara F302	Opel Spiess	17	(Netherlands) Stefan de Groot	10-13
(United Kingdom) Motaworld Racing	Dallara F302	Ford	18	(United Kingdom) Andrew Thompson	4
(United Kingdom) Motaworld Racing	Dallara F302	Ford	19	(United Kingdom) Tom Sisley	1-6
(United Kingdom) Motaworld Racing	Dallara F302	Ford	19	(United Kingdom) Stefan Hodgetts	8-13
Scholarship Class
(United Kingdom) Fred Goddard Racing	Dallara F301	Renault Sodemo	51	(Malaysia) Fairuz Fauzy	All
(United Kingdom) Fred Goddard Racing	Dallara F301	Renault Sodemo	52	(Turkey) Jason Tahinci	2
(United Kingdom) Fred Goddard Racing	Dallara F301	Renault Sodemo	52	(South Africa) Earl Goddard	3
(Sweden) Performance Racing	Dallara F301	Opel Spiess	53	(United Kingdom) Justin Sherwood	All
(Sweden) Performance Racing	Dallara F301	Opel Spiess	54	(France) Julien Schell	13
(Malaysia) Meritus Racing	Dallara F301	Mugen-Honda	55	(Republic of Ireland) Gavin Smith	All
(Malaysia) Meritus Racing	Dallara F301	Mugen-Honda	56	(United Kingdom) Stephen Colbert	All
(United Kingdom) Essential Motorsport	Dallara F301	Toyota	58	(Brazil) Reck Junior	4
(United Kingdom) Essential Motorsport	Dallara F301	Toyota	58	(Angola) Ricardo Teixeira	5
(United Kingdom) Essential Motorsport	Dallara F301	Toyota	59	(Denmark) Jesper Carlsen	1-9
(Italy) Scuderia Etruria	Dallara F301	Opel Spiess	60	(Italy) Diego Romanini	1-6
(United Kingdom) Sweeney Racing	Dallara F301	Mugen-Honda	61	(United Kingdom) Adam Carroll	All
(United Kingdom) Sweeney Racing	Dallara F301	Mugen-Honda	62	(Canada) Billy Asaro	All
(United Kingdom) Sweeney Racing	Dallara F301	Mugen-Honda	63	(Sweden) Robert Dahlgren	6-13
(United Kingdom) Team Park	Dallara F301	Opel Spiess	64	(United Kingdom) Stephen Colbert	1-2
(United Kingdom) Team Park	Dallara F301	Opel Spiess	64	(United Kingdom) Stefan Hodgetts	3
(United Kingdom) Team Park	Dallara F301	Opel Spiess	64	(United Kingdom) Adam Jones	8-9
(United Kingdom) Team Park	Dallara F301	Opel Spiess	64	(United Kingdom) David Clark	4-6
(United Kingdom) Team Park	Dallara F301	Opel Spiess	65	(United Kingdom) David Clark	1-3, 9
(United Kingdom) Diamond Racing	Dallara F301	Mugen-Honda	66	(Spain) Pedro Barral	10-12
(United Kingdom) Diamond Racing	Dallara F301	Mugen-Honda	77	(Switzerland) Harold Primat	All
(United Kingdom) T-Sport	Dallara F301	Mugen-Honda	67	(Monaco) Clivio Piccione	All
(United Kingdom) T-Sport	Dallara F301	Mugen-Honda	68	(India) Karun Chandhok	All
(United Kingdom) Hill Speed Motorsport	Dallara F301	Opel Spiess	69	(United Kingdom) Luke Stevens	13

== Race calendar and results ==
Round	Circuit	Date	Pole Position	Fastest Lap	Winning driver	Winning team	Scholarship Class Winner
1	(United Kingdom) Brands Hatch	1 April	(Australia) James Courtney	(Australia) James Courtney	(United Kingdom) Robbie Kerr	Alan Docking Racing	(Canada) Billy Asaro
2	(United Kingdom) Brands Hatch	1 April	(Australia) James Courtney	(Australia) James Courtney	(France) Bruce Jouanny	Promatecme UK	(United Kingdom) Adam Carroll
3	(United Kingdom) Donington Park	14 April	(Australia) James Courtney	(Australia) James Courtney	(Republic of Ireland) Michael Keohane	Carlin Motorsport	(United Kingdom) Adam Carroll
4	(United Kingdom) Donington Park	14 April	(Australia) James Courtney	(Australia) James Courtney	(Republic of Ireland) Michael Keohane	Carlin Motorsport	(United Kingdom) Adam Carroll
5	(United Kingdom) Silverstone	5 May	(Brazil) Fabio Carbone	(Australia) James Courtney	(United Kingdom) Mark Taylor	Manor Motorsport	(United Kingdom) Adam Carroll
6	(United Kingdom) Silverstone	5 May	(Australia) James Courtney	(Australia) James Courtney	(United Kingdom) Robbie Kerr	Alan Docking Racing	(Canada) Billy Asaro
7	(United Kingdom) Knockhill	12 May	(Australia) James Courtney	(Australia) James Courtney	(Australia) James Courtney	Carlin Motorsport	(United Kingdom) Stephen Colbert
8	(United Kingdom) Knockhill	12 May	(Australia) James Courtney	(Australia) James Courtney	(Australia) James Courtney	Carlin Motorsport	(United Kingdom) Adam Carroll
9	(United Kingdom) Croft	25 May	(Australia) James Courtney	(Australia) James Courtney	(Australia) James Courtney	Carlin Motorsport	(United Kingdom) Justin Sherwood
10	(United Kingdom) Croft	26 May	Round cancelled^{1}				
11	(United Kingdom) Silverstone	2 June	(Australia) James Courtney	(United Kingdom) Robbie Kerr	(United Kingdom) Robbie Kerr	Alan Docking Racing	(Monaco) Clivio Piccione
12	(United Kingdom) Silverstone	3 June	(United Kingdom) Mark Taylor	(Australia) James Courtney	(Australia) James Courtney	Carlin Motorsport	(United Kingdom) Adam Carroll
13	(United Kingdom) Castle Combe	22 June	(Australia) James Courtney	(Australia) James Courtney	(United Kingdom) Robbie Kerr	Carlin Motorsport	(United Kingdom) Adam Carroll
14	(United Kingdom) Castle Combe	23 June	(Australia) James Courtney	(Australia) James Courtney	(South Africa) Alan van der Merwe	Carlin Motorsport	(United Kingdom) Adam Carroll
15	(United Kingdom) Brands Hatch	30 June	(United Kingdom) Robbie Kerr	(United Kingdom) Robbie Kerr	(United Kingdom) Robbie Kerr	Alan Docking Racing	(Sweden) Robert Dahlgren
16	(United Kingdom) Brands Hatch	30 June	(United Kingdom) Robbie Kerr	(United Kingdom) Robbie Kerr	(United Kingdom) Robbie Kerr	Alan Docking Racing	(United Kingdom) Adam Carroll
17	(United Kingdom) Rockingham	21 July	(Finland) Heikki Kovalainen	(United Kingdom) Derek Hayes	(Japan) Shinya Hosokawa	Carlin Motorsport	(United Kingdom) Adam Carroll
18	(United Kingdom) Rockingham	21 July	(United Kingdom) Derek Hayes	(United Kingdom) Robbie Kerr	(United Kingdom) Robbie Kerr	Alan Docking Racing	(United Kingdom) Adam Carroll
19	(United Kingdom) Oulton Park	18 August	(Finland) Heikki Kovalainen	(Sweden) Robert Dahlgren	(Finland) Heikki Kovalainen	Fortec Motorsport	(Monaco) Clivio Piccione
20	(United Kingdom) Oulton Park	18 August	(Sweden) Robert Dahlgren	(Monaco) Clivio Piccione	(Australia) James Courtney	Carlin Motorsport	(Monaco) Clivio Piccione
21	(United Kingdom) Snetterton	31 August	(United Kingdom) Robbie Kerr	(United Kingdom) Robbie Kerr	(United Kingdom) Robbie Kerr	Alan Docking Racing	(United Kingdom) Adam Carroll
22	(United Kingdom) Snetterton	1 September	(United Kingdom) Robbie Kerr	(Brazil) Fabio Carbone	(Finland) Heikki Kovalainen	Fortec Motorsport	(United Kingdom) Adam Carroll
10^{1}	(United Kingdom) Snetterton	1 September	(Australia) James Courtney	(France) Bruce Jouanny	(United Kingdom) Robbie Kerr	Alan Docking Racing	(United Kingdom) Adam Carroll
23	(United Kingdom) Thruxton	15 September	(France) Bruce Jouanny	(Finland) Heikki Kovalainen	(Finland) Heikki Kovalainen	Fortec Motorsport	(Sweden) Robert Dahlgren
24	(United Kingdom) Thruxton	15 September	(France) Bruce Jouanny	(France) Bruce Jouanny	(Finland) Heikki Kovalainen	Fortec Motorsport	(Sweden) Robert Dahlgren
25	(United Kingdom) Donington Park	22 September	(United Kingdom) Robbie Kerr	(Finland) Heikki Kovalainen	(Finland) Heikki Kovalainen	Fortec Motorsport	(Sweden) Robert Dahlgren
26	(United Kingdom) Donington Park	22 September	(France) Bruce Jouanny	(France) Bruce Jouanny	(France) Bruce Jouanny	Promatecme UK	(Canada) Billy Asaro

Notes:

1. – The second race at the Croft meeting was cancelled due to poor weather conditions. It was run at the Snetterton meeting.

== Standings ==
Pos	Driver	BRH (United Kingdom)		DON (United Kingdom)		SIL (United Kingdom)		KNO (United Kingdom)		CRO (United Kingdom)		SIL (United Kingdom)		CAS (United Kingdom)		BRH (United Kingdom)		ROC (United Kingdom)		OUL (United Kingdom)		SNE (United Kingdom)			THR (United Kingdom)		DON (United Kingdom)		Pts
1	(United Kingdom) Robbie Kerr	1	3	6	3	4	1	Ret	12	Ret	C	1	6	1	DNS	1	1	6	1	7	2	1	1	Ret	4	3	3	3	306
2	(Australia) James Courtney	2	2	3	2	Ret	5	1	1	1	C	Ret	1	2	20	7	2			4	1	5	6	9	Ret	4	4	4	269
3	(Finland) Heikki Kovalainen	8	10	7	6	Ret	2	3	13	4	C	21	8	4	17	14	5	2	2	1	3	4	3	1	1	1	1	2	257
4	(France) Bruce Jouanny	6	1	2	16	6	4	4	3	8	C	5	5	3	3	6	3	4	Ret	19	10	2	2	3	Ret	2	2	1	249
5	(Republic of Ireland) Michael Keohane	DNS	Ret	1	1	3	7	Ret	2	3	C	6	7	5	2	2	18	Ret	6	DNS	DNS				2	7	5	24	169
6	(Brazil) Fabio Carbone	16	DNS	8	7	24	6	14	Ret	5	C	3	2	13	19	5	Ret	5	8	2	7	3	16	4	14	5	9	5	137
7	(United Kingdom) Mark Taylor	4	5	Ret	8	1	3	Ret	Ret	Ret	C	2	3	6	4	11	9	9	9	3	Ret	22	7	Ret	Ret	DNS			122
8	(South Africa) Alan van der Merwe	25	9	10	Ret	8	10	5	4	Ret	C	8	12	7	1	4	4	Ret	7	5	8	6	Ret	Ret	Ret	Ret	19	Ret	98
9	(United Kingdom) Rob Austin	5	6	5	4	Ret	9	7	9	6	C	10	10	9	7	3	8	11	Ret	Ret	Ret	Ret	Ret	Ret	5	9	7	10	90
10	(United States) Richard Antinucci	7	8	22	Ret	5	11	Ret	DNS	2	C	16	4	19	5	13	22	21	10	10	11	7	10	2	Ret	Ret	6	7	89
11	(Denmark) Ronnie Bremer	9	7	9	12	17	Ret	2	Ret	Ret	C	7	11	Ret	8	12	13	10	4	6	Ret	8	4	5	7	6	21	8	86
12	(Japan) Shinya Hosokawa	Ret	Ret	23†	Ret	10	12	8	5	DNS	C	Ret	15	20	16	9	10	1	13	Ret	6	21	9	15	Ret	DNS	16	13	51
13	(United Kingdom) Matthew Gilmore	13	Ret	NC	13	12	18	15	7	Ret	C	4	9	21	18	10	11	7	11	17	5	14	Ret	7	17	19	20	6	47
14	(Brazil) Ernani Judice	3	4	14	Ret	7	8	Ret	Ret																				31
15	(Netherlands) Stefan de Groot																			18	9	10	5		3	10	25	9	29
16	(United Kingdom) Derek Hayes																	3	3										25
17	(Sweden) Robert Dahlgren	10	12					6	6																				13
18	(United Kingdom) Tom Sisley	14	13	11	10	9	13	10	11	7	C	DNS	DNS																12
19	(United Kingdom) Mark Mayall	12	17	20	Ret	11	23	Ret	8	Ret	C	20	16	12	11	15	14	Ret	24	15	21	17	13	Ret	Ret	DNS	12	Ret	12
20	(France) James Andanson													17	25	8	7												9
21	(United Kingdom) Stefan Hodgetts															16	15	Ret	DNS	13	12	Ret	18		6	11	Ret	12	8
22	(Italy) Stefano Fabi	Ret	20	Ret	24	18	26	13	10	9	C	26	22	22	DNS	17	23	15	18	12	17	16	19	14	Ret	Ret	18	18	8
23	(Colombia) Giandomenico Brusatin	Ret	Ret	Ret	18	14	Ret	9	Ret	Ret	C	17	14	18	15	18	DNS												4
24	(Greece) John Antoniadis																			16	19	20	Ret		11	16	13	21	4
25	(United Kingdom) Tor Graves	15	15	24†	19	23	24	11	Ret	Ret	C	25	21	24	22	19	21	Ret	21	Ret	15	19	14	16	15	21	26	Ret	2
26	(United Kingdom) Andrew Thompson							12	Ret																				0
27	(Netherlands) Jeroen Bleekemolen																	Ret	23										0
Scholarship Class
1	(United Kingdom) Adam Carroll	Ret	11	4	5	2	17	17	14	Ret	C	14	13	8	6	23	6	8	5	Ret	Ret	9	8	6	9	13	17	Ret	367
2	(Monaco) Clivio Piccione	23	23†	12	9	Ret	15	18	Ret	11	C	9	Ret	15	10	21	Ret	19	14	8	4	18	Ret	8	Ret	15	10	15	249
3	(Canada) Billy Asaro	11	DNS	Ret	11	Ret	14	21	Ret	13	C	Ret	NC	25	9	22	DNS	Ret	15	9	Ret	11	11	11	12	14	11	11	216
4	(United Kingdom) Stephen Colbert	19	24†	13	17	19	29	16	20	DSQ	C	11	19	10	24	25	Ret	16	25	11	13	15	Ret	10	10	12	15	19	208
5	(Sweden) Robert Dahlgren											23	17	11	12	20	20	12	12	Ret	DSQ	Ret	Ret		8	8	8	17	167
6	(India) Karun Chandhok	21	19	Ret	14	13	19	Ret	16	15	C	12	20	Ret	Ret	DNS	12	13	17	Ret	20	13	Ret	Ret	Ret	17	Ret	14	156
7	(Republic of Ireland) Gavin Smith	Ret	14	15	23	Ret	Ret	25	21	14	C	24	23	14	14	24	Ret	20	16	Ret	18	12	12	12	13	Ret	14	16	147
8	(United Kingdom) Justin Sherwood	17	18	18	20	22	Ret	Ret	19	10	C	18	18	Ret	21	27	19	22	20	20	16	Ret	Ret	13	16	18	Ret	23	130
9	(Malaysia) Fairuz Fauzy	24	DNS	19	21	15	20	19	15	12	C	15	25	16	23	28	16	Ret	27	Ret	14	Ret	Ret	17	Ret	20	22	Ret	119
10	(Denmark) Jesper Carlsen	16	13	16	15	Ret	21	22	Ret	Ret	C	13	Ret	23	13	26	Ret	18	Ret										81
11	(Switzerland) Harold Primat	22	22	21	25	20	28	23	17	Ret	C	22	24		Ret	DNS	DNS	Ret	22	Ret	23	Ret	15	18	Ret	Ret	23	25	57
12	(United Kingdom) David Clark	DNS	Ret	17	DNQ	16	22	20	18	Ret	C	19	Ret					17	19										48
13	(Spain) Pedro Barral																			14	22	Ret	17		Ret	Ret			22
14	(Italy) Diego Romanini	20	21	DNQ	22	21	25	Ret	Ret	Ret	C	27	DNQ																22
15	(United Kingdom) Adam Jones															Ret	17	14	26										20
16	(United Kingdom) Stefan Hodgetts					Ret	16																						12
17	(United Kingdom) Luke Stevens																										24	20	6
18	(France) Julien Schell																										27	22	4
19	(Brazil) Reck Junior							24	Ret																				2
20	(South Africa) Earl Goddard					Ret	27																						1
	(Turkey) Jason Tahinci			DNQ	DNQ																								0
	(Angola) Ricardo Teixeira									DNQ	C																		0
Pos	Driver	BRH (United Kingdom)		DON (United Kingdom)		SIL (United Kingdom)		KNO (United Kingdom)		CRO (United Kingdom)		SIL (United Kingdom)		CAS (United Kingdom)		BRH (United Kingdom)		ROC (United Kingdom)		OUL (United Kingdom)		SNE (United Kingdom)			THR (United Kingdom)		DON (United Kingdom)		Pts
