= Lisa Walker (disambiguation) =

Lisa Walker is a contemporary New Zealand jeweller.

Lisa Walker may also refer to:

- Lisa Walker (curler) in British Columbia Scotties Tournament of Hearts
- Lisa Walker, musician in Wussy
- Lisa Walker, protagonist in Bed of Roses (1996 film)

== See also ==
- Elizabeth Walker (disambiguation)
- Liza Walker (born 1972), British actress
