= Eliza Walker =

Eliza Walker may refer to:

- Eliza Walker Dunbar (1845–1925), Scottish physician
- Eliza Rennie or Mrs. Eliza Walker (1813–1869), Scottish author
- Eliza Bannister Walker of Blandome, 20th-century American social worker in Virginia
- Eliza Walker, a ship which collided with the clipper ship Red Jacket in 1878 and sank
- Mary Eliza Walker Crump (1857–1928), African-American singer

== See also ==
- Elizabeth Walker (disambiguation)
