= Martin Byford =

British racing driver (born 1972)

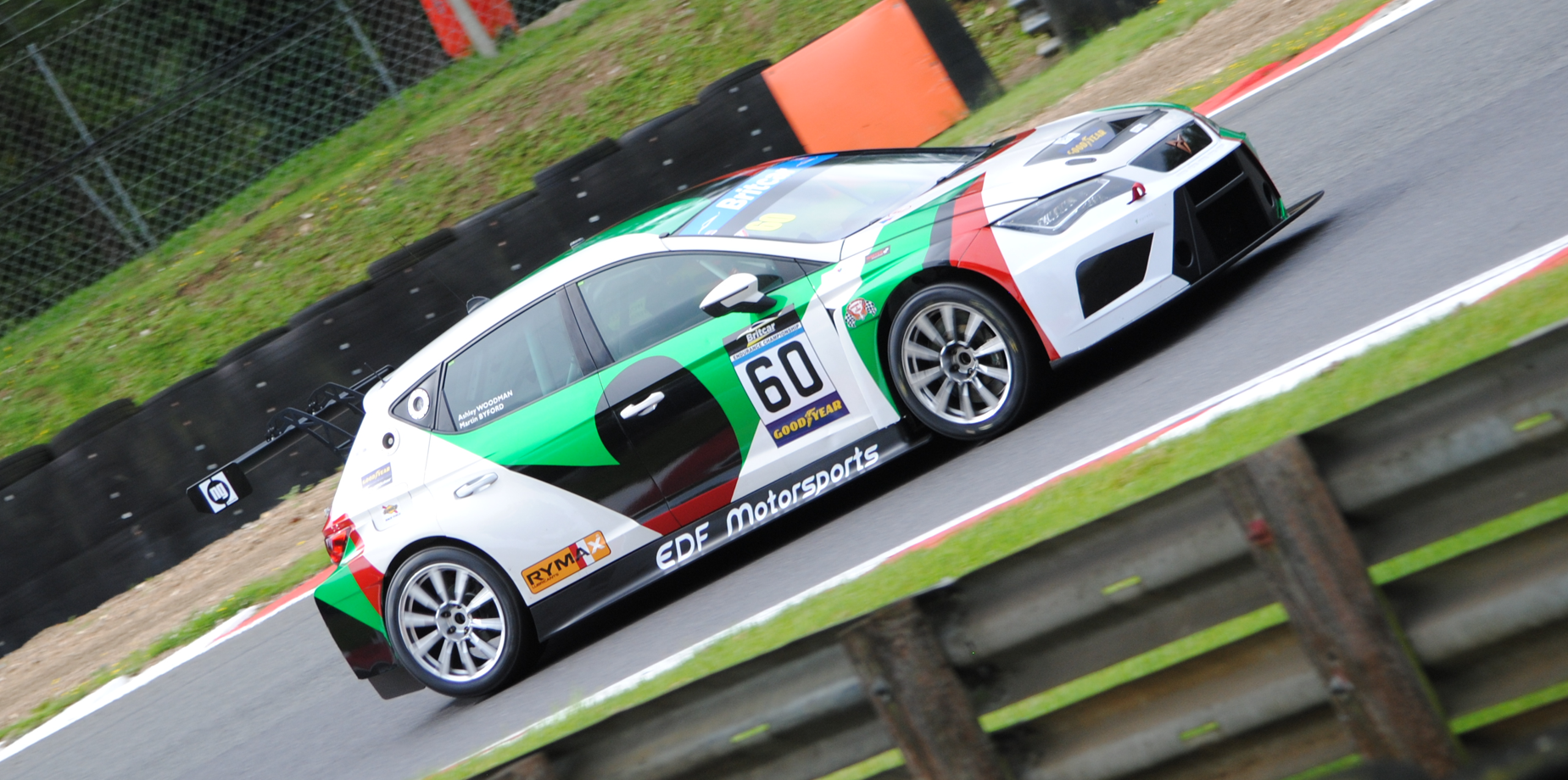
- Nationality: (United Kingdom) British
- Born: 27 May 1972 (age 54) Colchester, England

Previous series
- 2008 2001–02, 2006–07, 2013 2005 2003–04 2000 1995–96 1993–94: SEAT Cupra Championship; Renault Clio Cup UK; Mazda MX5 Championship; Super Coupe Cup; British GT Championship; British F3 Championship; British Formula Ford

Championship titles
- 2012 2007 2005 2003 1995: Britcar MSA British Endurance; Renault Clio Cup UK; Mazda MAX5 Championship; Super Coupe Cup; British F3 Class B

Martin Byford (born 27 May 1972) is a British racing driver from Colchester. He competed in the BTCC in 2011 for AmD Milltek. He is currently driving for BPM Motorsport in the 2019 Dunlop Endurance Championship with Ashley Woodman.

== Racing career ==
Byford began racing in single seaters, mainly in Formula Ford and Formula 3 cars. He later moved onto tin tops, racing in several club series.

Byford moved into the British GT Championship in 2000, where he achieved a few podium finishes. For 2001, he raced in the Renault Clio Cup UK, finishing third in the championship after a successful debut season. Byford remained in the championship for 2002, however he only managed fourth position in the championship.

Byford's next championship titles were the 2003 Super Coupe Cup and 2005 Mazda MX5 Championship. In 2006, he returned to the Clio Cup and finished 5th in the championship, in 2007 he won the championship despite not winning a race.

2008 saw Byford move into the Seat Cupra Cup, where he finished third in the championship after achieving three wins.

Budget issues prevented Byford from racing full-time for the next few seasons, until he was given the chance to race for AmD Milltek in the BTCC after their previous driver Tom Onslow-Cole left the team.

Byford signed with Team Bullrun in the Britcar British Endurance Championship after he was unable to raise the necessary funds to continue racing in the BTCC.

For the 2019 season of Britcar, Byford was again entered to race with BPM Motorsport after a successful 2018 season with Ash Woodman in a CUPRA León TCR.

In 2021, Byford would compete in the Britcar Endurance Championship, for the sixth time in a row and the fourth in the CUPRA León TCR, continuing with Ash Woodman for EDF Motorsports.

== Racing record ==
=== Complete British GT Championship results ===
(key) (Races in bold indicate pole position) (Races in italics indicate fastest lap)

Year	Team	Car	Class	1	2	3	4	5	6	7	8	9	10	11	12	Pos	Points
2000	NCK Motorsport	Marcos LM600	GT	THR; 1; 15	CRO; 1; 3	OUL; 1; 2	DON; 1; 7	SIL; 1 Ret	BRH; 1 Ret	DON; 1; 7	CRO; 1 Ret	SIL; 1; 13	SNE; 1; 8	SPA; 1; 10	SIL; 1; 15	10th	55

=== Complete British Touring Car Championship results ===
(key) (Races in bold indicate pole position – 1 point awarded just in first race) (Races in italics indicate fastest lap – 1 point awarded all races) (* signifies that driver lead race for at least one lap – 1 point awarded all races)

Year	Team	Car	1	2	3	4	5	6	7	8	9	10	11	12	13	14	15	16	17	18	19	20	21	22	23	24	25	26	27	28	29	30	DC	Pts
2011	AmD Milltek Racing.com	Volkswagen Golf	BRH; 1	BRH; 2	BRH; 3	DON; 1	DON; 2	DON; 3	THR; 1	THR; 2	THR; 3	OUL; 1	OUL; 2	OUL; 3	CRO; 1	CRO; 2	CRO; 3	SNE; 1; 14	SNE; 2 Ret	SNE; 3; 16	KNO; 1 Ret	KNO; 2 Ret	KNO; 3 Ret	ROC; 1; 20	ROC; 2; 18	ROC; 3; 16	BRH; 1; 22	BRH; 2; 15	BRH; 3; 16	SIL; 1 Ret	SIL; 2; 24	SIL; 3; 15	30th	0

=== Complete Britcar results ===
(key) (Races in bold indicate pole position in class – 1 point awarded just in first race; races in italics indicate fastest lap in class – 1 point awarded all races;-

Year	Team	Car	Class	1	2	3	4	5	6	7	8	9	10	11	12	13	14	15	16	DC	CP	Points
2012	Bullrun	Lotus Evora	3	**SIL**; **1**; 6	**DON1**; **1**; 6	SNE1; 1; 6	**BRH**; **1**; 4	**OUL**; **1**; 1	**SNE2**; **1**; 3	**DON2**; **1**; 12										1st	1st	244
2016	Synchro Motorsport	Honda Civic Type R	5	SIL; 1	**SNE**; **1**; 7	DON; 1	THR; 1	CRO; 1	**SIL**; **1**; 12	**OUL**; **1**; 12	BRH; 1									4th	1st	116
2017	Synchro Motorsport	Honda Civic Type R	E5	SIL1; 1	SIL1; 2	SNE; 1	SNE; 2	SIL2; 1	SIL2; 2	**BRH**; **1**; 15	BRH; 1; 6	DON; 1	DON; 2	OUL; 1	OUL; 2	SIL2; 1				12th	1st	113
2017	Synchro Motorsport	Honda Civic Type R	S5														**BRH**; **1**; 7	BRH; 1; 5		8th	3rd	53
2018	BPM Racing	CUPRA León TCR	E4	**ROC**; **1**; 15	ROC; 1; 4	SIL1; 1	SIL1; 2	OUL; 1	OUL; 2	DON; 1 Ret	DON; 2 DNS	SNE; 1	SNE; 2	SIL2; 1	SIL2; 2	**BRH**; **1** Ret	BRH; 2; 2			8th	4th	102
2019	BPM Racing	CUPRA León TCR	4	SIL1; 1; 19	SIL1; 2; 18	SIL2; 1; 13	SIL2; 2; 14	BRH1; 1; 4	BRH1; 2 Ret	DON; 1 Ret	DON; 2 Ret	OUL1; 1; 14	OUL1; 2 DNS	SNE; 1	SNE; 2	OUL2; 1	OUL2; 2	BRH2; 1	BRH2; 1	23rd	6th	95
2020	EDF Motorsports	CUPRA León TCR	4	CRO; 1; 3	CRO; 2; 7	BRH; 1; 11	BRH; 2; 11	OUL; 1	SIL; 1; 7	SIL; 2; 6	SNE; 1; 14	SNE; 2; 15								7th	3rd	174
2021	EDF Motorsports	CUPRA León TCR	4	SIL; 1; 25	SIL; 2 Ret	SNE; 1; 8	SNE; 2; 15	OUL; 1; 12	OUL; 2; 11	SIL; 1; 17	BRH; 1 C	BRH; 1 C	DON; 1; 15	DON; 2; 16						3rd	2nd	196

=== Complete British Endurance Championship results ===
(key) (Races in bold indicate pole position in class – 1 point awarded just in first race; races in italics indicate fastest lap in class – 1 point awarded all races;-

Year	Team	Car	Class	1	2	3	4	5	6	DC	CP	Points
2022	EDF Motorsports	Cupra León Competición TCR	E	**SIL1**; 8	OUL; DNS	SNE; 9	**SIL2**; 6	**DON1**; 18	**DON2**; Ret	14th	4th	114
2023	EDF Motorsports	Cupra León Competición TCR	TCR	SIL1; 5	BRH; 9	OUL; 10	SIL2; 19	SNE	DON	5th*‡	2nd*‡	101.5*‡

^{*}Season still in progress. ‡ Team standings.
