= Robbie Kerr (racing driver) =

British racing driver (born 1979)

Robert Kerr
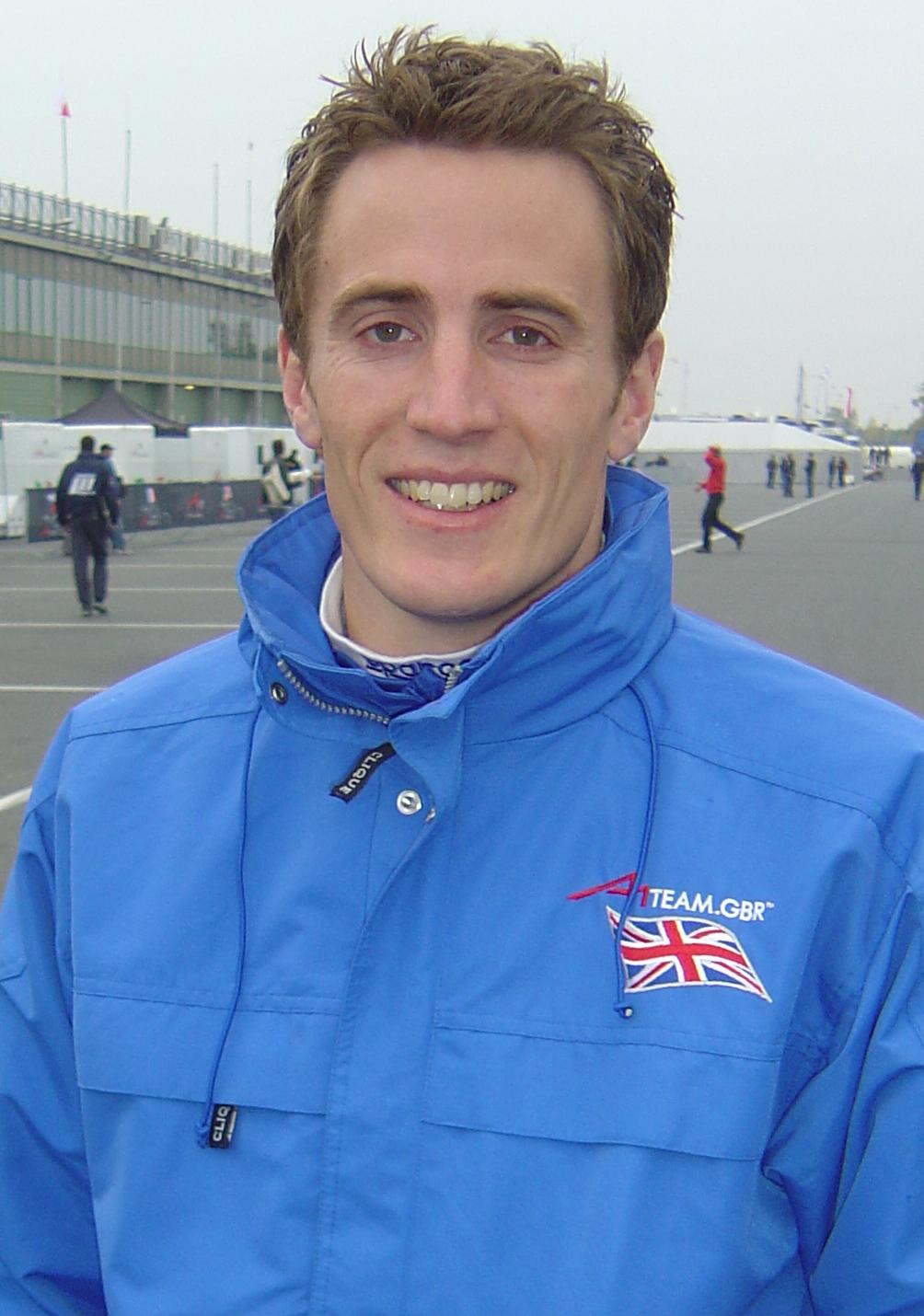
- Kerr in 2007
- Nationality: (United Kingdom) British
- Born: 26 September 1979 (age 47) High Wycombe, Buckinghamshire, England
- Categorisation: FIA Platinum (until 2014); FIA Gold (2015–2022); FIA Silver (2023–)

Previous series
- 2001–02 2003 2004 2006 2005–2009: British Formula Three; Formula Renault V6 Eurocup; Formula 3000; Formula Renault 3.5; A1 Grand Prix

Championship titles
- 2002: British Formula Three Championship

24 Hours of Le Mans career
- Years: 2007
- Teams: (France) Barazi-Epsilon
- Best finish: 2nd (2007)

Robert "Robbie" Kerr (born 26 September 1979 in High Wycombe, Buckinghamshire) is a British racing driver. In 2002, Kerr won the British Formula 3 championship.

== Career ==
=== Early career ===
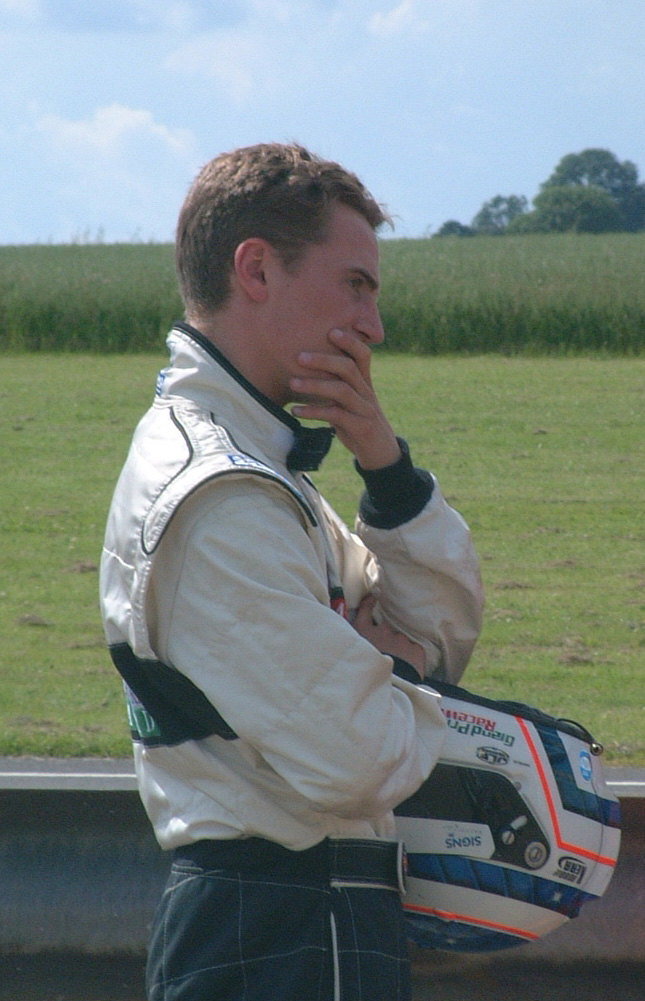
Kerr after crashing out of an F3 race at Castle Combe in 2002.

In 2002, Kerr became the British Formula Three Champion for Alan Docking Racing with 306 points ahead of Australian racing driver James Courtney.

Following an abortive attempt at International Formula 3000 in 2003, Kerr did not race again until 2004, when he raced in the Formula Renault V6 Eurocup. At the opening round at Monza Kerr had earned pole position but mechanical problems forced him out. He eventually won a race at the last race of the season in Valencia. He had not led the race until he took the lead on the last lap.

Kerr has also raced in the Le Mans Endurance Series. In one of the most impressive debuts the series has seen he raced at Silverstone in a Zytek 04S P1 and was partnered by American Chris Dyson. He took pole position from the Audi R8s of Allan McNish and Johnny Herbert by more than 1.6 seconds. Kerr eventually finished fourth but set the fastest lap of the race.

=== A1 Grand Prix ===
In 2005, Kerr became the lead driver for A1 Team Great Britain, partner to Alex Lloyd. Robbie raced in the 2005–06 rounds except the season finale in China, and came close to winning on several occasions. At the feature race at the inaugural round at Brands Hatch after a successful pitstop he was in the lead ahead of A1 Team Brazil until the battery failed in his car.

At Dubai Autodrome, Kerr had the lead for most of the feature race until he was passed by A1 Team France's Nicolas Lapierre. He performed well in the next round on the Durban street circuit, South Africa, where he finished second in the sprint race, and held the lead briefly in the early stages of the feature race, only for a pipe to get lodged underneath the car in his pit stop, he came in again on the next lap to get it removed but damage to the floor of the car led to Kerr's retirement.

Kerr then took A1 Team Great Britain's first ever A1 Grand Prix pole position in the next round in Indonesia, but he lost out in the races, failing to turn those pole positions into a win, and in Mexico he struggled in qualifying, ended up down the order in unfamiliar territory, and just missing out on the points in the sprint race in 11th, but improving in the feature race to sixth position. At Mazda Raceway Laguna Seca, Kerr raced his last two races for A1 Team Great Britain in the season. In a rain-sodden sprint race, Kerr finished fourth behind Mexico, France and Portugal. In the feature race, he finished third behind Mexico and A1 Team Germany. Kerr did not race at Shanghai to prepare for the 2006 World Series by Renault, and his place was taken by Indy Racing League driver Darren Manning.

The following season, Kerr returned to Team GBR for A1GP, though his World Series by Renault commitments (see below) prevented him from making the first round of the season at Zandvoort. He was again replaced by Manning. For this whole season, Kerr will be supported by Manning and young British Formula 3 star Oliver Jarvis.

=== Formula Renault 3.5 ===
For the 2006 season, Kerr joined Sean McIntosh in the KTR team racing in the 2006 Formula Renault 3.5 Series season. Success was limited during the season with a best finish of fourth, then a fastest lap in the final round, resulting in a 17th finish in the overall standing.

=== Other drives ===
Since the solitary season of Formula Renault, Kerr has driven only sporadically and across different series. He had several sportscar outings in 2008 and 2009, a guest drive at the Silverstone round of the Porsche Carrera Cup in 2010 and a season of the Speed Euroseries in 2011. Kerr returned to sportscars in 2012 and 2013 picking up some drives in the FIA World Endurance Championship with a second place in the LMP2 class at Interlagos.

== Racing record ==
=== Complete A1 Grand Prix results ===
(key) (Races in bold indicate pole position) (Races in italics indicate fastest lap)

Year	Entrant	1	2	3	4	5	6	7	8	9	10	11	12	13	14	15	16	17	18	19	20	21	22	DC	Points
2005–06	Great Britain	GBR; SPR; 5	GBR; FEA; Ret	GER; SPR; Ret	GER; FEA; 2	POR; SPR; Ret	POR; FEA; 12	AUS; SPR; 5	AUS; FEA; 2	MYS; SPR; 3	MYS; FEA; Ret	UAE; SPR; 9	UAE; FEA; 2	RSA; SPR; 2	RSA; FEA; Ret	**IDN**; **SPR**; 2	IDN; FEA; 10	MEX; SPR; 11	MEX; FEA; 6	USA; SPR; 4	USA; FEA; 3	CHN; SPR	CHN; FEA	**3rd**	**97**
2006–07	Great Britain	NED; SPR	NED; FEA	CZE; SPR; 9	CZE; FEA; 6	BEI; SPR	BEI; FEA	MYS; SPR; 5	MYS; FEA; 2	IDN; SPR; 3	IDN; FEA; Ret	NZL; SPR; 8	NZL; FEA; Ret	AUS; SPR; 19	AUS; FEA; 10	RSA; SPR; 9	RSA; FEA; 2	MEX; SPR	MEX; FEA	**SHA**; **SPR**; 1	SHA; FEA; 2	**GBR**; **SPR**; 1	GBR; SPR; 2	**3rd**	**92**
2007–08	Great Britain	NED; SPR	NED; FEA	CZE; SPR; 2	CZE; FEA; 17	MYS; SPR	MYS; FEA	ZHU; SPR	ZHU; FEA	NZL; SPR; Ret	NZL; FEA; Ret	AUS; SPR; 16	AUS; FEA; 3	RSA; SPR	RSA; FEA	MEX; SPR	MEX; FEA	SHA; SPR; 9	SHA; FEA; 9	**GBR**; **SPR**; 1	GBR; SPR; 2			**3rd**	**126**

=== Complete Formula Renault 3.5 Series results ===
(key) (Races in bold indicate pole position) (Races in italics indicate fastest lap)

Year	Entrant	1	2	3	4	5	6	7	8	9	10	11	12	13	14	15	16	17	DC	Points
2006	KTR	ZOL; 1; 7	ZOL; 2 Ret	MON; 1; 7	IST; 1 Ret	IST; 2 Ret	MIS; 1; 10	MIS; 2 Ret	SPA; 1; 22†	SPA; 2 DSQ	NÜR; 1; 15	NÜR; 2; 10	DON; 1; 12	DON; 2; 10	LMS; 1; 4	LMS; 2; 21†	CAT; 1 Ret	CAT; 2 Ret	17th	20

^{†} Driver did not finish the race, but was classified as he completed more than 90% of the race distance.

=== 24 Hours of Le Mans results ===
Year	Team	Co-Drivers	Car	Class	Laps	Pos.	Class Pos.
2007	(France) Barazi-Epsilon (United Kingdom) Zytek Engineering	(Mexico) Adrian Fernández (Japan) Karuki Kurosawa	Zytek 07S/2	LMP2	301	27th	**2nd**

Awards and achievements
Preceded by Takuma Sato	Autosport; National Racing Driver of the Year; 2002	Succeeded by Nelson Piquet Jr.
Sporting positions
Preceded by Marc Hynes	British Formula Renault Drivers'; Champion; 1998	Succeeded by Antônio Pizzonia
Preceded by Takuma Sato	British Formula Three Champion; 2002	Succeeded by Alan van der Merwe
