= 2007 Renault Clio Cup United Kingdom =

The 2007 Elf Renault Clio Cup United Kingdom season began at Brands Hatch on 31 March and finished after 12 races over 10 events at Thruxton on 14 October. The Championship was won by Martin Byford driving for his own Z Speed Racing team, despite not winning a race.

== Changes for 2007 ==
- The new Clio Cup 197 was introduced.
- A new race format was introduced which featured two qualifying heats and a final due to an over-subscribed entry.

== Race Format ==
After Friday testing at each event the field would be split into two groups (group A for drivers finishing the session in odd-numbered positions and group B for drivers finishing in even-numbered positions). Each group would then have separate qualifying sessions on the Saturday which set the grids for the heats. The heat races set the grid for Sunday's championship race, where the winner of the heat containing the fastest lap time of the two heats would start on pole, with the remainder of the field from that heat filling the pole side of the grid in finishing order. The drivers from the other heat would fill the other side of the grid, again, in finishing order. The last few (the number varied from circuit to circuit) finishers in each heat would fail to qualify for the championship race but would be classed as reserves should there be any non-starters.

At meetings where the entry was smaller than the maximum number of permitted starters, the race format was the same as in previous years.

== Teams and drivers ==
All competitors raced in Renault Clio Cup 197s.

Team	No.	Drivers	Rounds
Total Control Racing	1	(United Kingdom) James Williams	All
Total Control Racing	6	(United Kingdom) Ben Winrow	All
Total Control Racing	8	(United Kingdom) Alex MacDowall	All
Total Control Racing	9	(Republic of Ireland) Jonathan Fildes	All
JHR Developments	2	(United Kingdom) Michael Doyle	1
JHR Developments	2	(United Kingdom) Jim Edwards Jr.	2-10
JHR Developments	3	(United Kingdom) Andrew Herron	All
JHR Developments	7	(United Kingdom) Paul Rivett	9
JHR Developments	25	(United Kingdom) Robert Lawson	All
JHR Developments	38	(United Kingdom) Steve Wood	1, 3, 5, 7-10
JHR Developments	38	(United Kingdom) Richard Cannon	4
JHR Developments	38	(United Kingdom) Stephen Oates	6
JHR Developments	48	(United Kingdom) Richard Cannon	5-6, 9
JHR Developments	48	(United Kingdom) Paul Rivett	8, 10
Youth 4 Human Rights with SVE	4	(Austria) Niki Lanik	All
PH Motorsport	5	(United Kingdom) Phil House	All
Full Speed Racing	10	(United Kingdom) Ciaran Butler	1-6
Full Speed Racing	11	(United Kingdom) Martin Johnston	1-9
Full Speed Racing	12	(United Kingdom) Nikki Welsby	1
Full Speed Racing	18	(United Kingdom) Mark Speller	All
Full Speed Racing	19	(United Kingdom) Ant Scragg	1-9
Full Speed Racing	23	(United Kingdom) Chris Panayiotou	1-3, 5-6, 8-9
Glenn Eagling Motorsport	13	(United Kingdom) Guy Parr	1, 3-5, 7
Glenn Eagling Motorsport	27	(United Kingdom) Dan Eagling	1-9
Mardi Gras Motorsport	14	(United Kingdom) Ed Pead	All
Mardi Gras Motorsport	15	(United Kingdom) Chris Rice	All
Mardi Gras Motorsport	20	(United Kingdom) Jon Lanceley	1-3
Mardi Gras Motorsport	33	(Republic of Ireland) Árón Smith	All
Amery Motorsport	16	(United Kingdom) Jonathan Shepherd	All
Amery Motorsport	17	(United Kingdom) David Shepherd	All
Momo UK	21	(United Kingdom) Sean Brown	1
Momo UK	21	(United Kingdom) Stefan Hodgetts	2-10
Momo UK	28	(United Kingdom) Robert Brown	All
Coastal Racing	22	(United Kingdom) Carl Bradley	1-2, 4-10
Robertshaw Racing	24	(United Kingdom) Michael Doyle	2-10
Robertshaw Racing	26	(United Kingdom) Barry Benham	5-10
Robertshaw Racing	32	(United Kingdom) Alan Taylor	1-9
Robertshaw Racing	43	(United Kingdom) Derek Pierce	8-10
Robertshaw Racing	49	(United Kingdom) Chris Dymond	All
Team TWC	26	(United Kingdom) Barry Benham	1-4
APO Motorsport	29	(United Kingdom) Alex Osborne	All
Z Speed Racing	34	(United Kingdom) Martin Byford	All
Team Pyro	36	(Guernsey) Chris Law	All
Team Pyro	55	(United Kingdom) Mel Healey	All
Booker Motorsport	41	(United Kingdom) Dean Hobson	3, 6
J & D Pierce Race Team	43	(United Kingdom) Derek Pierce	1-6
Cleland Motorsport	44	(United Kingdom) Jamie Cleland	All
Cleland Motorsport	88	(United Kingdom) Finlay Crocker	1-5
Cleland Motorsport	88	(United Kingdom) Jamie Clarke	6
Cleland Motorsport	88	(Republic of Ireland) Simon Quinn	9
EPS UK with IDL Racing Services	46	(United Kingdom) Robert Gaffney	All
SMC Renault/Academy Motorsport	48	(United Kingdom) Jim Edwards Sr.	1-3
Collison Racing	50	(United Kingdom) Steve Collison	1-5, 7-10
Double Six Racing	66	(United Kingdom) Andrew Bentley	1-7, 9
Team Eurotech Racing with John Guest Speedfit	77	(United Kingdom) Andrew Jordan	1-9
Team Eurotech Racing with John Guest Speedfit	77	(United Kingdom) Ian Curley	10
Kangaroo International/ SMC Renault/Mark Fish Motorsport	99	(United Kingdom) Jim Edwards Jr.	1

== Calendar & Winners ==
The series supported the British Touring Car Championship at nine of the ten rounds. The series skipped the round at Knockhill and instead raced at the World Series by Renault meeting at Donington Park on 8-9 September.

Round		Venue	Date	Pole position	Fastest lap	Winning driver	Winning team
1	Q1	Brands Hatch (Indy), Kent	31 March-1 April	(United Kingdom) Ed Pead	(United Kingdom) Ben Winrow	(United Kingdom) Ed Pead	Mardi Gras Motorsport
1	Q2	Brands Hatch (Indy), Kent	31 March-1 April	(United Kingdom) Andrew Jordan	(United Kingdom) Michael Doyle	(United Kingdom) Martin Byford	Z Speed Racing
1	R1	Brands Hatch (Indy), Kent	31 March-1 April	(United Kingdom) Ed Pead	(United Kingdom) Andrew Jordan	(United Kingdom) Ed Pead	Mardi Gras Motorsport
2	Q1	Rockingham Motor Speedway, Northamptonshire	21–22 April	(United Kingdom) Robert Lawson	(United Kingdom) Robert Lawson	(United Kingdom) Robert Lawson	JHR Developments
2	Q2	Rockingham Motor Speedway, Northamptonshire	21–22 April	(United Kingdom) Ed Pead	(United Kingdom) Stefan Hodgetts	(United Kingdom) Ben Winrow	Total Control Racing
2	R2	Rockingham Motor Speedway, Northamptonshire	21–22 April	(United Kingdom) Ben Winrow	(United Kingdom) Stefan Hodgetts	(United Kingdom) Stefan Hodgetts	Momo UK
3	Q1	Thruxton Circuit, Hampshire	5–6 May	(United Kingdom) Stefan Hodgetts	(United Kingdom) Ed Pead	(United Kingdom) Stefan Hodgetts	Momo UK
3	Q2	Thruxton Circuit, Hampshire	5–6 May	(United Kingdom) Robert Lawson	(United Kingdom) Martin Byford	(United Kingdom) Robert Lawson	JHR Developments
3	R3	Thruxton Circuit, Hampshire	5–6 May	(United Kingdom) Robert Lawson	(United Kingdom) Martin Byford	(United Kingdom) Stefan Hodgetts	Momo UK
4	Q1	Croft Circuit, North Yorkshire	2–3 June	(United Kingdom) Phil House	(United Kingdom) Robert Lawson	(Republic of Ireland) Jonathan Fildes	Total Control Racing
4	Q2	Croft Circuit, North Yorkshire	2–3 June	(United Kingdom) Stefan Hodgetts	(United Kingdom) Stefan Hodgetts	(United Kingdom) Stefan Hodgetts	Momo UK
4	R4	Croft Circuit, North Yorkshire	2–3 June	(United Kingdom) Stefan Hodgetts	(United Kingdom) Stefan Hodgetts	(United Kingdom) Stefan Hodgetts	Momo UK
5	Q1	Oulton Park (Island), Cheshire	23–24 June	(United Kingdom) Stefan Hodgetts	(Republic of Ireland) Jonathan Fildes	(United Kingdom) Stefan Hodgetts	Momo UK
5	Q2	Oulton Park (Island), Cheshire	23–24 June	(United Kingdom) Ed Pead	(United Kingdom) Michael Doyle	(United Kingdom) Ed Pead	Mardi Gras Motorsport
5	R5	Oulton Park (Island), Cheshire	23–24 June	(United Kingdom) Stefan Hodgetts	(United Kingdom) Andrew Bentley	(United Kingdom) Stefan Hodgetts	Momo UK
6	Q1	Donington Park (National), Leicestershire	14–15 July	(United Kingdom) Martin Byford	(United Kingdom) Ben Winrow	(United Kingdom) Martin Byford	Z Speed Racing
6	Q2	Donington Park (National), Leicestershire	14–15 July	(United Kingdom) Stefan Hodgetts	(United Kingdom) Stefan Hodgetts	(United Kingdom) Stefan Hodgetts	Momo UK
6	R6	Donington Park (National), Leicestershire	14–15 July	(United Kingdom) Martin Byford	(United Kingdom) David Shepherd	(United Kingdom) Ben Winrow	Total Control Racing
7	R7	Snetterton Motor Racing Circuit, Norfolk	28–29 July	(United Kingdom) Michael Doyle	(United Kingdom) Andrew Jordan	(United Kingdom) Michael Doyle	Robertshaw Racing
7	R8	Snetterton Motor Racing Circuit, Norfolk	28–29 July	(United Kingdom) Michael Doyle	(United Kingdom) Robert Lawson	(United Kingdom) Robert Lawson	JHR Developments
8	Q1	Brands Hatch (Indy), Kent	18–19 August	(United Kingdom) Martin Byford	(Republic of Ireland) Jonathan Fildes	(United Kingdom) Martin Byford	Z Speed Racing
8	Q2	Brands Hatch (Indy), Kent	18–19 August	(United Kingdom) Ben Winrow	(United Kingdom) Ben Winrow	(United Kingdom) Ben Winrow	Total Control Racing
8	R9	Brands Hatch (Indy), Kent	18–19 August	(United Kingdom) Ben Winrow	(United Kingdom) Paul Rivett	(United Kingdom) Paul Rivett	JHR Developments
9	Q1	Donington Park (GP), Leicestershire	8–9 September	(United Kingdom) Michael Doyle	(United Kingdom) Martin Byford	(United Kingdom) Paul Rivett	JHR Developments
9	Q2	Donington Park (GP), Leicestershire	8–9 September	(United Kingdom) Stefan Hodgetts	(United Kingdom) Stefan Hodgetts	(United Kingdom) Stefan Hodgetts	Momo UK
9	R10	Donington Park (GP), Leicestershire	8–9 September	(United Kingdom) Paul Rivett	(United Kingdom) Michael Doyle	(United Kingdom) Paul Rivett	JHR Developments
10	R11	Thruxton Circuit, Hampshire	13–14 October	(United Kingdom) Robert Lawson	(United Kingdom) Robert Lawson	(United Kingdom) Jim Edwards Jr.	JHR Developments
10	R12	Thruxton Circuit, Hampshire	13–14 October	(United Kingdom) Jim Edwards Jr.	(United Kingdom) Martin Byford	(United Kingdom) Stefan Hodgetts	Momo UK

== Standings ==
Points were awarded on a 32, 28, 25, 22, 20, 18, 16, 14, 12, 11, 10, 9, 8, 7, 6, 5, 4, 3, 2, 1 basis to the top 20 finishers in each race, with 2 bonus points for the fastest lap in each race. All scores counted towards the championship.

=== Drivers' Championship ===
Pos	Driver	BRH			ROC			THR			CRO			OUL			DON			SNE		BRH			DON			THR		Total	Pen	Pts
Pos	Driver	QR1	QR2	R	QR1	QR2	R	QR1	QR2	R	QR1	QR2	R	QR1	QR2	R	QR1	QR2	R	R1	R2	QR1	QR2	R	QR1	QR2	R	R1	R2	Total	Pen	Pts
1	(United Kingdom) Martin Byford		1	4	2		5		2	2		2	4	2		2	1		8	9	3	1		2	2		3	2	2	284		284
2	(United Kingdom) Stefan Hodgetts					4	1	1		1	1		1	1		1		1	3	2	Ret		7	DNS		1	2	Ret	1	245	9^{1}	236
3	(United Kingdom) Robert Lawson		3	3	1		4		1	6		5	5		3	7		3	2	Ret	1	3		5	3		5	Ret	3	230	2^{2}	228
4	(United Kingdom) Jim Edwards Jr.	4		10		6	17	2		5	4		3		4	11	7		5	Ret	6		6	7		3	14	1	4	185	3^{3}	182
5	(United Kingdom) Ben Winrow	11		11		1	2		3	3	7		11	4		4	2		1	Ret	7		1	3		7	13	Ret	DNS	176	3^{4}	173
6	(United Kingdom) Ed Pead	1		1		5	6	4		9	2		Ret		1	3		4	4	5	8		3	DNS	4		4	8	21	179	9^{5}	170
7	(United Kingdom) Michael Doyle		4	5		2	19	5		8		4	6		2	5	3		13	1	2	2		DNS	13		9	Ret	Ret	156		156
8	(United Kingdom) Chris Dymond	5		8		3	3	6		10		Ret	DNQ		13	24		2	Ret	3	Ret		4	DNS	8		8	5	6	127	8^{6}	119
9	(United Kingdom) Andrew Herron		6	9	6		12		9	13	6		14		8	18	14		9	8	4	6		DNS		6	10	3	Ret	123	6^{7}	117
10	(United Kingdom) Mark Speller	2		6		7	7		4	4		6	7		5	12		14	Ret	17	12		14	8	6		11	Ret	24	118	2^{8}	116
11	(United Kingdom) Phil House	6		13		11	13		5	16		3	10	5		8	11		10	24	19	4		4	5		6	12	Ret	108		108
12	(United Kingdom) Andrew Jordan		2	2	3		Ret	3		7	3		Ret	6		9		8	7	4	5	11		DNS	5		DNS			118	12^{9}	106
13	(Republic of Ireland) Árón Smith		5	7	4		9	7		11	16		Ret	9		16	17		16	26	14	7		12	7		15	4	9	104	6^{10}	98
14	(Republic of Ireland) Jonathan Fildes	Ret		DNQ		8	Ret	11		Ret		1	2	3		6		7	Ret	Ret	11	5		6	9		12	11	Ret	93	2^{11}	91
15	(United Kingdom) Paul Rivett																						2	1	1		1	Ret	5	86		86
16	(United Kingdom) Dan Eagling		7	12	5		10		6	14	8		9	8		14	4		6	7	18		Ret	DNQ		Ret	DNS			83	2^{12}	81
17	(United Kingdom) Barry Benham	3		14		9	14		8	23	10		22	7		15	5		15	6	13	Ret		Ret		2	7	DNS	8	82	12^{13}	70
18	(United Kingdom) David Shepherd		18	DNQ	13		20	18		Ret	12		13	12		Ret	16		29	13	22		11	11		11	17	6	7	67	6^{14}	61
19	(United Kingdom) James Williams	9		Ret		12	11		Ret	DNQ		9	12		12	22	9		Ret	12	23	8		22	12		21	9	17	44		44
20	(United Kingdom) Andrew Bentley		11	21	9		8	8		18		7	8		9	10		5	19	Ret	DNS			10			Ret			46	3^{15}	43
21	(United Kingdom) Alex Osborne		Ret	DNQ	11		16	13		24	9		Ret		Ret	DNQ	10		30	20	16	Ret		DNQ		12	18	7	10	41		41
22	(United Kingdom) Jamie Cleland		12	Ret	8		22	14		Ret		11	21	16		23	20		DNQ	14	15		15	15		8	19	17	13	33		33
23	(United Kingdom) Derek Pierce		8	16	15		18		10	17	11		19	Ret		DNQ		Ret	DNQ				10	9	14		16	Ret	Ret	31		31
24	(United Kingdom) Robert Gaffney	8		Ret		18	Ret		13	Ret		16	17	14		26	13		18	18	17	13		17	Ret		25	15	16	29	2 ^{16}	27
25	(United Kingdom) Ant Scragg		17	DNQ	10		15	17		21		10	Ret	11		17	8		28	15	Ret	10		10		Ret	26			27	3^{17}	24
26	(Austria) Niki Lanik		14	17	7		Ret		7	12	5		Ret		Ret	DNQ		Ret	12	DSQ	10		5	16	11		Ret	Ret	20	39	16^{18}	23
27	(Guernsey) Chris Law		10	Ret	14		25	15		22		17	Ret	13		21		Ret	23	16	Ret		12	14		13	27	Ret	12	21		21
28	(United Kingdom) Steve Wood	10		15					18	25					6	28				Ret	25	9		24		10	Ret	10	18	20		20
29	(United Kingdom) Mel Healey		13	22	Ret		DNQ		15	26	19		25		Ret	DNQ	15		24	23	24	15		18	17		29	14	15	16		16
30	(United Kingdom) Robert Brown		Ret	DNQ	DSQ		DNQ		17	28	15		16		17	DNQ		9	11	Ret	Ret	12		DNS		Ret	Ret	Ret	11	25	10^{19}	15
31	(United Kingdom) Chris Panayiotou	Ret		DNQ		16	21	12		19				10		13	12		14				9	Ret	15		32			17	2^{20}	15
32	(United Kingdom) Alex MacDowall		9	18	12		Ret	9		Ret		8	24		7	DSQ		6	17	10	9		13	13		4	22	Ret	22	38	25^{21}	13
33	(United Kingdom) Carl Bradley	7		Ret		14	Ret					12	28	Ret		DNQ	6		22	11	20	16		20		Ret	Ret	Ret	Ret	12	2^{22}	10
34	(United Kingdom) Ian Curley																											NC	14	7		7
35	(United Kingdom) Ciaran Butler	15		19		Ret	DNQ	12		Ret		13	15	15		Ret		10	20											9	2^{23}	7
36	(United Kingdom) Jonathan Shepherd	14		24		17	26	Ret		DNQ	18		DNQ		15	20		13	21	21	Ret	14		DNS		14	33	16	23	9	3^{24}	6
37	(United Kingdom) Jon Lanceley	Ret		DNQ		10	Ret		11	15																				6		6
38	(United Kingdom) Steve Collison	18		DNQ		15	28	19		27		14	Ret	18		DNQ				22	21		16	21		Ret	30	16	19	7	2^{25}	5
39	(United Kingdom) Finlay Crocker	13		Ret		13	27		14	Ret	13		18		16	27														3		3
40	(United Kingdom) Chris Rice		15	25	Ret		Ret	10		20	Ret		DNQ		11	19		12	Ret	Ret	DNS		8	Ret		Ret	24	Ret	Ret	3	2^{26}	1
41	(United Kingdom) Richard Cannon										17		23	Ret		DNQ		Ret	26							9	20			1		1
42	(United Kingdom) Sean Brown	12		20																										1		1
43	(United Kingdom) Jim Edwards Sr.		16	23	Ret		24	16		Ret																				0		0
44	(United Kingdom) Martin Johnston	16		26		19	DNQ		19	29		18	26	17		DNQ	19		DNQ	25	26		17	23	18		31			0		0
45	(United Kingdom) Guy Parr	Ret		DNQ					16	Ret	14		27		14	25				Ret	DNS									0		0
46	(Republic of Ireland) Simon Quinn																								Ret		28			0		0
NC	(United Kingdom) Jamie Clarke																	11	Ret											0		0
NC	(United Kingdom) Nikki Welsby	17		DNQ																										0		0
NC	(United Kingdom) Stephen Oates																	Ret	DNQ											0		0
NC	(United Kingdom) Dean Hobson							20		DNQ							18		25											0	2^{27}	-2
NC	(United Kingdom) Alan Taylor		Ret	DNQ	Ret		23		20	DNQ		15	20		10	Ret		Ret	27	19	Ret		18	19	16		23			5	12^{28}	-7
Pos	Driver	QR1	QR2	R	QR1	QR2	R	QR1	QR2	R	QR1	QR2	R	QR1	QR2	R	QR1	QR2	R	R1	R2	QR1	QR2	R	QR1	QR2	R	R1	R2	Total	Pen	Pts
Pos	Driver	BRH			ROC			THR			CRO			OUL			DON			SNE		BRH			DON			THR		Total	Pen	Pts

Notes:

1. - Stefan Hodgetts was docked three points at Snetterton and six points at the second Brands Hatch meeting.
2. - Robert Lawson was docked two points at Snetterton.
3. - Jim Edwards Jr. was docked three points at the second Donington Park meeting.
4. - Ben Winrow was docked three points at the first Brands Hatch meeting.
5. - Ed Pead was docked three points at Rockingham, three points at the second Thruxton meeting as well as a further three point penalty.
6. - Chris Dymond was docked two points at the first Brands Hatch meeting and six points at Oulton Park.
7. - Andrew Herron was docked two points at the first Thruxton meeting, two points at Snetterton as well as a further two point penalty.
8. - Mark Speller was docked two points at Snetterton.
9. - Andrew Jordan was docked eight points at the second Brands Hatch meeting, two points at the second Donington Park meeting as well as a further two point penalty.
10. - Árón Smith was docked two points at Rockingham, two points at Croft as well as a further two point penalty.
11. - Jonathan Fildes was docked two points at the second Brands Hatch meeting.
12. - Dan Eagling was docked two points at Snetterton.
13. - Barry Benham was docked two points at the first Thruxton meeting, two points at Croft, six points at the second Brands Hatch meeting as well as a further two point penalty.
14. - David Shepherd was docked two points at Rockingham, two points at the second Donington Park meeting as well as a further two point penalty.
15. - Andrew Bentley was docked three points at the first Donington Park meeting.
16. - Robert Gaffney was docked two points at the second Donington Park meeting.
17. - Ant Scragg was docked three points at the first Donington Park meeting.
18. - Niki Lanik was docked two points at Croft, four points at Snetterton, two points at the second Donington Park meeting as well as a further eight point penalty.
19. - Robert Brown was docked four points at Rockingham and six points at the second Brands Hatch meeting.
20. - Chris Panayiotou was docked two points at the first Donington Park meeting.
21. - Alex MacDowall was docked three points at Rockingham, six points at Oulton Park, six points at the second Brands Hatch meeting as well as a further ten point penalty.
22. - Carl Bradley was docked two points at the first Brands Hatch meeting.
23. - Ciaran Butler was docked two points at Oulton Park.
24. - Jonathan Shepherd was docked three points at Croft.
25. - Steve Collison was docked two points at the first Brands Hatch meeting.
26. - Chris Rice was docked two points at the second Brands Hatch meeting.
27. - Dean Hobson was docked two points at the first Donington Park meeting.
28. - Alan Taylor was docked four points at the first Donington Park meeting, six points at the second Brands Hatch meeting as well as a further two point penalty.

Notes:

1. - Stefan Hodgetts was docked three points at Snetterton and six points at the second Brands Hatch meeting.
2. - Robert Lawson was docked two points at Snetterton.
3. - Jim Edwards Jr. was docked three points at the second Donington Park meeting.
4. - Ben Winrow was docked three points at the first Brands Hatch meeting.
5. - Ed Pead was docked three points at Rockingham, three points at the second Thruxton meeting as well as a further three point penalty.
6. - Chris Dymond was docked two points at the first Brands Hatch meeting and six points at Oulton Park.
7. - Andrew Herron was docked two points at the first Thruxton meeting, two points at Snetterton as well as a further two point penalty.
8. - Mark Speller was docked two points at Snetterton.
9. - Andrew Jordan was docked eight points at the second Brands Hatch meeting, two points at the second Donington Park meeting as well as a further two point penalty.
10. - Árón Smith was docked two points at Rockingham, two points at Croft as well as a further two point penalty.
11. - Jonathan Fildes was docked two points at the second Brands Hatch meeting.
12. - Dan Eagling was docked two points at Snetterton.
13. - Barry Benham was docked two points at the first Thruxton meeting, two points at Croft, six points at the second Brands Hatch meeting as well as a further two point penalty.
14. - David Shepherd was docked two points at Rockingham, two points at the second Donington Park meeting as well as a further two point penalty.
15. - Andrew Bentley was docked three points at the first Donington Park meeting.
16. - Robert Gaffney was docked two points at the second Donington Park meeting.
17. - Ant Scragg was docked three points at the first Donington Park meeting.
18. - Niki Lanik was docked two points at Croft, four points at Snetterton, two points at the second Donington Park meeting as well as a further eight point penalty.
19. - Robert Brown was docked four points at Rockingham and six points at the second Brands Hatch meeting.
20. - Chris Panayiotou was docked two points at the first Donington Park meeting.
21. - Alex MacDowall was docked three points at Rockingham, six points at Oulton Park, six points at the second Brands Hatch meeting as well as a further ten point penalty.
22. - Carl Bradley was docked two points at the first Brands Hatch meeting.
23. - Ciaran Butler was docked two points at Oulton Park.
24. - Jonathan Shepherd was docked three points at Croft.
25. - Steve Collison was docked two points at the first Brands Hatch meeting.
26. - Chris Rice was docked two points at the second Brands Hatch meeting.
27. - Dean Hobson was docked two points at the first Donington Park meeting.
28. - Alan Taylor was docked four points at the first Donington Park meeting, six points at the second Brands Hatch meeting as well as a further two point penalty.

== Winter Cup ==
The Winter Cup was contested over two rounds at Donington Park on 3 November and Croft on 10 November. It was won by Niki Lanik driving for Youth 4 Human Rights with SVE.

=== Teams & Drivers ===
Team	No.	Drivers	Rounds
JHR Developments	3	(United Kingdom) Andrew Herron	All
JHR Developments	48	(United Kingdom) Richard Cannon	All
Youth 4 Human Rights with SVE	4	(Austria) Niki Lanik	All
Robertshaw Racing	7	(United Kingdom) Harry Vaulkhard	All
Total Control Racing	8	(United Kingdom) Alex MacDowall	All
Total Control Racing	22	(United Kingdom) Mike Robinson	All
Total Control Racing	77	(United Kingdom) Jonathan Ridley-Holloway	All
www.maximumsolutions.co.uk	11	(United Kingdom) Stewart Lines	All
Coastal Racing	12	(United Kingdom) Carl Bradley	All
Team Pyro	25	(United Kingdom) Joe Hopkins	All
Team Pyro	36	(Guernsey) Chris Law	All
Mardi Gras Motorsport	33	(Republic of Ireland) Árón Smith	2

=== Calendar & Winners ===
Round		Venue	Date	Pole position	Fastest lap	Winning driver	Winning team
1	R1	Donington Park (National), Leicestershire	3 November	(United Kingdom) Harry Vaulkhard	(United Kingdom) Harry Vaulkhard	(Austria) Niki Lanik	Youth 4 Human Rights with SVE
1	R2	Donington Park (National), Leicestershire	3 November	(United Kingdom) Richard Cannon	(United Kingdom) Andrew Herron	(Austria) Niki Lanik	Youth 4 Human Rights with SVE
2	R3	Croft Circuit, North Yorkshire	10 November	(United Kingdom) Harry Vaulkhard	(United Kingdom) Alex MacDowall	(United Kingdom) Andrew Herron	JHR Developments
2	R4	Croft Circuit, North Yorkshire	10 November	(United Kingdom) Harry Vaulkhard	(United Kingdom) Harry Vaulkhard	(Austria) Niki Lanik	Youth 4 Human Rights with SVE

=== Drivers' Championship ===
Points were awarded on the same scale as the main championship. All scores counted.

Pos	Driver	DON		CRO		Pts
1	(Austria) Niki Lanik	1	1	2	1	124
2	(United Kingdom) Andrew Herron	2	3	1	3	112
3	(United Kingdom) Alex MacDowall	4	2	7	6	86
4	(United Kingdom) Carl Bradley	5	4	4	5	84
5	(Guernsey) Chris Law	6	6	9	9	60
6	(United Kingdom) Jonathan Ridley-Holloway	9	8	6	7	60
7	(United Kingdom) Richard Cannon	3	Ret	5	8	59
8	(United Kingdom) Mike Robinson	7	7	8	10	57
9	(United Kingdom) Stewart Lines	8	9	3	Ret	51
10	(United Kingdom) Joe Hopkins	10	5	11	11	51
11	(United Kingdom) Harry Vaulkhard	Ret	10	Ret	2	43
12	(Republic of Ireland) Árón Smith			10	4	33
Pos	Driver	DON		CRO		Pts
