= 2010 Trofeo Abarth 500 GB season =

2010 Trofeo Abarth 500 GB

Seasons
- ← none 2011 →

The 2010 Zing Trofeo Abarth 500 GB season was the inaugural edition of the series. It began at Oulton Park on 5 April and finished after seven events at Autodromo Nazionale Monza on 24 October. The championship was won by Ben Winrow, driving for Team Pyro. The team title was won by Mardigras motorsport. The championship was organised and managed by the company CTC (calleatechcenter) Ltd. The series was launched on 22 October in Silverstone, where six 500 AC (assetto corsa) race cars were presented to the press and competitors. The championship was contested over seven rounds, each composed by two races. The championship calendar was composed by different events: British GT, Formula 2, British superbike, Lotus festival, DTM, Silverstone Classic and the Italian Ferrari Challenge. The permit holder was MotorSport Vision. The manager of the series was Paolo Callea, previous British GT manager.

== Teams and drivers ==
All drivers competed in Abarth 500 Assetto Corses. Guest drivers in italics.

Team	No.	Drivers	Rounds
Mardi Gras Motorsport	2	(United Kingdom) Paul Smith	1–6
Mardi Gras Motorsport	51	(United Kingdom) Paul Smith	7
Mardi Gras Motorsport	3	(United Kingdom) Stefan Hodgetts	2–6
Mardi Gras Motorsport	52	(United Kingdom) Stefan Hodgetts	7
Team Pyro	4	(United Kingdom) Ben Winrow	1–6
Team Pyro	53	(United Kingdom) Ben Winrow	7
Team Pyro	54	(United Kingdom) Josh Wakefield	7
Advent Motorsport	7	(United Kingdom) Charlie Butler-Henderson	1–6
Advent Motorsport	9	(United Kingdom) Gareth Howell	2
Advent Motorsport	45	(United Kingdom) Josh Wakefield	1–6
Advent Motorsport	55	(United Kingdom) James Blyth	1–2
Unknown	8	(United Kingdom) Chris Stockton	2
Unknown	8	(United Kingdom) Jeremy McWilliams	3
Tech 9	8	(United Kingdom) Tony Dron	1
Tech 9	9	(United Kingdom) Gareth Howell	1
Lipscombe Motorsport	9	(United Kingdom) Gareth Howell	3
Unknown	10	(United Kingdom) Chris Smith	5
Pulce Racing	10	(United Kingdom) Darren Burke	6
Pulce Racing	13	(United Kingdom) Marco Pullen	5
Pulce Racing	22	(Denmark) Benny Simonsen	1–2, 5–6
Pulce Racing	49	(United Kingdom) Simon Baker	6
Reflex Racing GB	11	(United Kingdom) Sarah Franklin	1–2, 4–6
Coastal Racing	12	(United Kingdom) Carl Bradley	5
Rockingham Cars	12	(United Kingdom) Craig Dawson	6
Rockingham Cars	77	(United Kingdom) Roger Green	2
Abarth UK	49	(United Kingdom) John Gaw	2
Abarth UK	77	(United Kingdom) Alistair Barclay	4
Lunar Racing	72	(United Kingdom) Cassey Watson	1–6
Lunar Racing	93	(United Kingdom) John Williams	1
Redline Racing	77	(United Kingdom) Jason Greatrex	1
CMS	81	(United Kingdom) Matt Shead	1–6
CMS	82	(United Kingdom) Fiona Leggate	1–3

== Calendar and winners ==
Round		Circuit	Date	Pole position	Fastest lap	Winning driver	Winning team	Supporting
1	R1	(United Kingdom) Oulton Park (International), Cheshire	5 April	(United Kingdom) Ben Winrow	(Denmark) Benny Simonsen	(United Kingdom) Gareth Howell	Tech 9	British F3 & GT
1	R2	(United Kingdom) Oulton Park (International), Cheshire	5 April		(Denmark) Benny Simonsen	(United Kingdom) Gareth Howell	Tech 9	British F3 & GT
2	R3	(United Kingdom) Silverstone Circuit (Bridge GP), Northamptonshire	18 April	(United Kingdom) Ben Winrow	(United Kingdom) Stefan Hodgetts	(United Kingdom) Stefan Hodgetts	Mardi Gras Motorsport	FIA Formula Two
2	R4	(United Kingdom) Silverstone Circuit (Bridge GP), Northamptonshire	18 April		(United Kingdom) Stefan Hodgetts	(United Kingdom) Ben Winrow	Team Pyro	FIA Formula Two
3	R5	(United Kingdom) Cadwell Park, Lincolnshire	23 May	(United Kingdom) Stefan Hodgetts	(United Kingdom) Stefan Hodgetts	(United Kingdom) Stefan Hodgetts	Mardi Gras Motorsport	British Superbikes
3	R6	(United Kingdom) Cadwell Park, Lincolnshire	23 May		(United Kingdom) Stefan Hodgetts	(United Kingdom) Stefan Hodgetts	Mardi Gras Motorsport	British Superbikes
4	R7	(United Kingdom) Snetterton Motor Racing Circuit, Norfolk	27 June	(United Kingdom) Stefan Hodgetts	(United Kingdom) Ben Winrow	(United Kingdom) Ben Winrow	Team Pyro	Formula Palmer Audi
4	R8	(United Kingdom) Snetterton Motor Racing Circuit, Norfolk	27 June		(United Kingdom) Ben Winrow	(United Kingdom) Ben Winrow	Team Pyro	Formula Palmer Audi
5	R9	(United Kingdom) Silverstone Circuit (Classic GP), Northamptonshire	25 July	(United Kingdom) Stefan Hodgetts	(United Kingdom) Stefan Hodgetts	(United Kingdom) Stefan Hodgetts	Mardi Gras Motorsport	Silverstone Classic
5	R10	(United Kingdom) Silverstone Circuit (Classic GP), Northamptonshire	25 July		(United Kingdom) Stefan Hodgetts	(United Kingdom) Stefan Hodgetts	Mardi Gras Motorsport	Silverstone Classic
6	R11	(United Kingdom) Brands Hatch (Indy), Kent	5 September	(United Kingdom) Stefan Hodgetts	(United Kingdom) Stefan Hodgetts	(United Kingdom) Stefan Hodgetts	Mardi Gras Motorsport	DTM
6	R12	(United Kingdom) Brands Hatch (Indy), Kent	5 September		(United Kingdom) Stefan Hodgetts	(United Kingdom) Stefan Hodgetts	Mardi Gras Motorsport	DTM
7	R13	(Italy) Autodromo Nazionale Monza, Monza*	24 October	(United Kingdom) Stefan Hodgetts	(United Kingdom) Stefan Hodgetts	(United Kingdom) Stefan Hodgetts	Mardi Gras Motorsport	Trofeo Abarth 500 Europe
7	R14	(Italy) Autodromo Nazionale Monza, Monza*	24 October		(United Kingdom) Josh Wakefield	(United Kingdom) Stefan Hodgetts	Mardi Gras Motorsport	Trofeo Abarth 500 Europe

- Combination event with the European & Italian series.

== Championship standings ==
Points were awarded on a 21, 18, 16, 14, 12, 10, 8, 6, 4, 3, 2, 1 basis to the top 12 finishers in each race, with one bonus point for the fastest lap in each race. A driver's six best weekend scores counted towards the championship. Dropped scores are shown in brackets.

Pos	Driver	OUL (United Kingdom)		SIL (United Kingdom)		CAD (United Kingdom)		SNE (United Kingdom)		SIL (United Kingdom)		BRA (United Kingdom)		MON (Italy)		Pts
1	(United Kingdom) Ben Winrow	**Ret**	(3)	**2**	1	2	2	1	**1**	2	2	2	2	3	3	224 (240)
2	(United Kingdom) Stefan Hodgetts			1	**Ret**	**1**	**1**	**2**	Ret	**1**	**1**	**1**	**1**	**1**	**1**	215
3	(United Kingdom) Charlie Butler-Henderson	2	4	4	3	3	3	5	4	3	3	3	4			182
4	(United Kingdom) Josh Wakefield	5	6	5	4	(6)	(6)	3	3	4	4	4	3	2	2	175 (195)
5	(United Kingdom) Paul Smith	6	Ret	7	5	5	4	Ret	DNS	8	7	6	6	Ret	Ret	94
6	(United Kingdom) Gareth Howell	1	1	3	2	4	Ret									90
7	(United Kingdom) Cassey Watson	8	10	9	9	9	8	4	2	5	Ret	NC	9			78
8	(Denmark) Benny Simonsen	3	**2**	6	8					12	6	Ret	Ret			70
9	(United Kingdom) Matt Shead	9	11	8	6	7	5	6	Ret	7	Ret	Ret	Ret			63
10	(United Kingdom) Sarah Franklin	11	9	10	10			8	5	9	9	8	10			57
11	(United Kingdom) Fiona Leggate	Ret	7	DSQ	11	8	7									25
12	(United Kingdom) Craig Dawson											5	5			24
13	(United Kingdom) Jason Greatrex	7	5													20
14	(United Kingdom) Alistair Barclay							7	6							18
15	(United Kingdom) Simon Baker											7	8			14
16	(United Kingdom) James Blyth	4	Ret	NC	DNS											14
17	(United Kingdom) Darren Burke											Ret	7			8
18	(United Kingdom) John Williams	12	DNS													2
Guest drivers ineligible for points
	(United Kingdom) Carl Bradley									10	5					0
	(United Kingdom) Chris Smith									6	8					0
	(United Kingdom) Roger Green			Ret	7											0
	(United Kingdom) Tony Dron	10	8													0
	(United Kingdom) Marco Pullen									11	Ret					0
	(United Kingdom) John Gaw			Ret	DNS											0
	(United Kingdom) Chris Stockton			DSQ	DNS											0
	(United Kingdom) Jeremy McWilliams					DNS	DNS									0
Pos	Driver	OUL (United Kingdom)		SIL (United Kingdom)		CAD (United Kingdom)		SNE (United Kingdom)		SIL (United Kingdom)		BRA (United Kingdom)		MON (Italy)		Pts

Colour	Result
Gold	Winner
Silver	Second place
Bronze	Third place
Green	Points classification
Blue	Non-points classification
Blue	Non-classified finish (NC)
Purple	Retired, not classified (Ret)
Red	Did not qualify (DNQ)
Red	Did not pre-qualify (DNPQ)
Black	Disqualified (DSQ)
White	Did not start (DNS)
White	Withdrew (WD)
White	Race cancelled (C)
Blank	Did not practice (DNP)
Blank	Did not arrive (DNA)
Blank	Excluded (EX)

**Bold** - Pole
Italics - Fastest lap

== Abarth 500 Celebrity Challenge ==
A celebrity race was held on the Friday of the Silverstone Classic meeting in aid of the CRUK Bobby Moore Fund. It was won by Rick Parfitt Jr.

Pos	Driver	Time/Gap	Grid
1	(United Kingdom) Rick Parfitt Jr.	9 Laps in 22'00.012s	1
2	(United Kingdom) Neil Primrose	+3.221s	2
3	(United Kingdom) Paul O'Duffy	+18.149s	6
4	(United Kingdom) James Martin	+18.558s	5
5	(Jamaica) Luther Blissett	+22.312s	3
6	(United Kingdom) Tom Chambers	+31.736s	4
7	(United Kingdom) Richard Allinson	+1'13.098s	7
8	(United Kingdom) Mark Gardener	+1'13.430s	10
9	(New Zealand) Brendan Cole	+1'13.724s	9
10	(United Kingdom) Charles Brocket	+1'22.727s	11
11	(United Kingdom) Johnnie Walker	+2'11.653s	12
NC	(United Kingdom) Heston Blumenthal	+3 laps	8
NC	(United Kingdom) Beth Walker	+4 laps	-
Ret	(United Kingdom) Jonny Saunders	Retired	13
