= Stefan Hodgetts =

British racing driver (born 1982)

- Nationality: (United Kingdom) British
- Born: 17 June 1982 (age 44) Bromsgrove, Worcestershire, England
- Relatives: Chris Hodgetts (father)

Renault Clio Cup United Kingdom career
- Debut season: 2007
- Current team: Scuderia Vittoria
- Car number: 5
- Former teams: Momo UK; Total Control Racing; JHR Developments; Mardi Gras Motorsport
- Starts: 36
- Wins: 14
- Poles: 5
- Fastest laps: 4
- Best finish: 2nd in 2007

Previous series
- 2011 2011 2010 2010 2008 2008 2008 2004 2003 2002 2001 2000–01 2000 1999 1999: Ginetta GT Supercup; British GT Championship; Trofeo Abarth 500 GB; Ginetta G50 Cup; Copa de España de Resistencia; Porsche Carrera Cup Great Britain; Renault Clio Cup Belux; British Touring Car Championship; SEAT Cupra Championship; British Formula 3 Championship; Formula Renault 2000 Eurocup; British Formula Ford Championship; Formula Renault UK; British Formula Ford Winter Series; Formula Vauxhall

Stefan Hodgetts (born 17 June 1982 in Bromsgrove) is a British auto racing driver, best known for driving a part season in the British Touring Car Championship. His father Chris was twice champion of the BTCC.

== Racing career ==
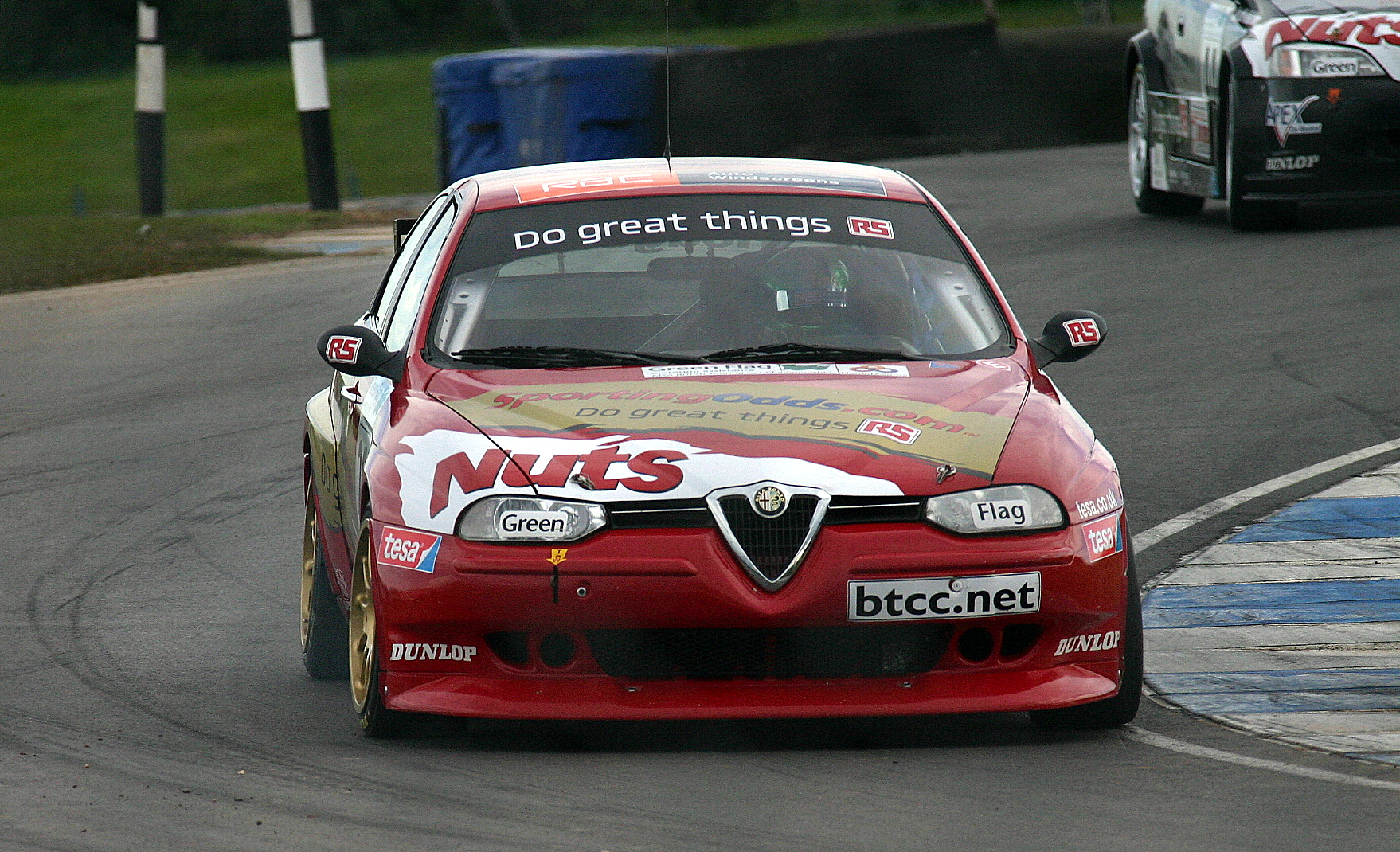
Hodgetts driving the Team Sureterm Alfa Romoe 156 at Donington Park during the 2004 British Touring Car Championship season.

Hodgetts started in karting competing for his father's team. Hodgetts switched to single-seater racing in 1998, in Formula 600. In 1999, he finished fifth in the Formula Vauxhall Championship and fourth in Formula Ford Winter Series. He had drives in both the Formula Ford Championship and the Formula Renault Championship in 2000, and Formula Ford Championship and Formula Renault Euro Cup in 2001. In 2003, he raced in the inaugural SEAT Cupra Championship, finishing the season third in points. In 2004, he got a drive in the BTCC for the Gary Ayles run Team Sureterm. He did not start the season till round thirteen at Mondello Park in a Vauxhall Astra Coupe. After missing the meeting at Knockhill he rejoined for the rest of the season at Brands Hatch for the same team, but in an Alfa Romeo 156. He finished fifteenth in the independents championship, and total standings in eighteenth with four points.

Hodgetts drove in the Renault Clio Cup in 2007 for MOMO UK, and for Total Control Racing in 2008. He made a one-off appearance in the guest car in the Ginetta G50 Cup at Croft in 2010, finishing on the podium in all three races.

== Racing record ==
=== Complete British Touring Car Championship results ===
(key) (Races in bold indicate pole position – 1 point awarded just in first race) (Races in italics indicate fastest lap – 1 point awarded all races) (* signifies that driver lead race for at least one lap – 1 point awarded all races)

Year	Team	Car	1	2	3	4	5	6	7	8	9	10	11	12	13	14	15	16	17	18	19	20	21	22	23	24	25	26	27	28	29	30	DC	Pts
2004	GA Motorsports	Vauxhall Astra Coupé	THR; 1	THR; 2	THR; 3	BRH; 1	BRH; 2	BRH; 3	SIL; 1	SIL; 2	SIL; 3	OUL; 1	OUL; 2	OUL; 3	MON; 1 Ret	MON; 2 DNS	MON; 3 Ret	CRO; 1; 10	**CRO**; **2** Ret	CRO; 3 Ret	KNO; 1	KNO; 2	KNO; 3										18th	4
2004	GA Motorsports	Alfa Romeo 156																						BRH; 1 Ret	BRH; 2 Ret	BRH; 3 Ret	SNE; 1 Ret	SNE; 2 DNS	SNE; 3; 9	DON; 1 Ret	DON; 2 Ret	DON; 3; 10	18th	4

=== Complete British GT Championship results ===
(key) (Races in bold indicate pole position in class; races in italics indicate fastest lap in class)

Year	Team	Car	Class	1	2	3	4	5	6	7	8	9	10	Pos	Points
2014	GPRM	Toyota GT86 GT4	Inv	OUL; 1	OUL; 2	ROC; 1	SIL; 1 DNS	SNE; 1	SNE; 2	SPA; 1	SPA; 2	BRH; 1; 24	DON; 1; 25†	NC‡	0‡

* Season still in progress.
† Driver did not finish the race, but was classified as he completed over 90% of the race distance.
‡ As Hodgetts was a guest driver, he was ineligible for championship points.
