= Elizabeth A. Walker =

American diabetes nurse scientist

Elizabeth Arquin Walker
- Education: Catholic University of America; Chestnut Hill College; Creighton University The University of Notre Dame
- Scientific career
- Workplaces: Albert Einstein College of Medicine; Yale School of Nursing; State University of New York; Columbia University Teachers College; University of Nebraska Medical Center
- Thesis: The relationship to self-monitoring of blood glucose and intrinsic motivation to regimen adherence in adults with diabetes mellitus (1988)

Elizabeth Arquin Walker is an American diabetes nurse scientist who is emeritus Professor of Medicine at the Albert Einstein College of Medicine. Her research considers how people with diabetes may better manage their disease. In 2000 she served as the President of the American Diabetes Association. She is a Fellow of the American Association of Diabetes Educators.

== Early life and education ==
Walker earned her bachelor's degree at Chestnut Hill College. She moved to South Bend, Indiana for her graduate studies, where she earned a master's degree at the University of Notre Dame. She moved to Creighton University, Omaha, Nebraska for a bachelor's degree in nursing. After graduating, Walker worked as a nurse in the University of Nebraska Medical Center. When her husband's career and law school moved the family to New Haven, Connecticut, she became a visiting nurse. In this capacity she witnessed first hand how important it was for diabetes patients to be able to manage their own health. After a family move to Washington, DC, she started her doctoral research. In 1988 Walker completed her PhD at the Catholic University of America.

== Research and career ==
After earning her doctorate Walker joined the State University of New York as an Associate Professor of Nursing. She moved to the Albert Einstein College of Medicine in 1990, where she was eventually promoted to Professor in 2004. Her research considered evidence-based approaches to improve the self-management of diabetes. She has shown that regular telephone counselling can serve as a high impact, low cost tool to lower blood sugar in adults with uncontrolled diabetes. Unfortunately, printed self management tools are not sufficient to improve the control of diabetes.

In 2016 Walker was awarded a multi-million dollar grant from the National Institutes of Health to launch a centre that focussed on translational diabetes research. The centre has a particular focus on the health of people from low-income communities and marginalised ethnic groups. Whilst Walker initially focused on diabetes control in New York City, she soon added a focus on global health, with a particular focus on Uganda.

Walker was funded by the NIH to study the Power Up for Health lifestyle intervention program which looked to prevent diabetes in high-risk men of color. The program was offered in recreation centers across New York City and delivered by multi-lingual men lifestyle coaches. Over the sixteen week intervention, intervention participants experienced minimal weight loss, but some improvement in healthy eating and fewer depressive symptoms.

== Awards and honors ==
Walker was elected President of the American Diabetes Association in 1999. She was awarded the Creighton University Alumni Merit Award in 2002. She was elected Fellow of the American Association of Diabetes Educators in 2008. In 2016 Walker was awarded the American Diabetes Association Richard R. Rubin award for behavioral research in diabetes.

== Selected publications ==
- Diabetes Control Complications Trial Research Group; Nathan, D. M.; Genuth, S.; Lachin, J.; Cleary, P.; Crofford, O.; Davis, M.; Rand, L.; Siebert, C. (1993-09-30). "The Effect of Intensive Treatment of Diabetes on the Development and Progression of Long-Term Complications in Insulin-Dependent Diabetes Mellitus". New England Journal of Medicine. 329 (14): 977–986. doi:10.1056/NEJM199309303291401. ISSN 0028-4793. PMID 8366922. S2CID 21528496.
- Knowler, William C.; Barrett-Connor, Elizabeth; Fowler, Sarah E.; Hamman, Richard F.; Lachin, John M.; Walker, Elizabeth A.; Nathan, David M.; Diabetes Prevention Program Research Group (2002-02-07). "Reduction in the incidence of type 2 diabetes with lifestyle intervention or metformin". The New England Journal of Medicine. 346 (6): 393–403. doi:10.1056/NEJMoa012512. ISSN 1533-4406. PMC 1370926. PMID 11832527.
- Group, The Diabetes Prevention Program (DPP) Research (2002-12-01). "The Diabetes Prevention Program (DPP): Description of lifestyle intervention". Diabetes Care. 25 (12): 2165–2171. doi:10.2337/diacare.25.12.2165. ISSN 0149-5992. PMC 1282458. PMID 12453955.
