= Emmet O'Brien =

Irish racing driver

Emmet O'Brien (born 7 March 1981, in Dublin) is an Irish auto racing driver.

== Career ==
O'Brien started competing in the Irish Karting championships at a young age, he finished second in the National Irish Formula A karting championship for PCR in 1998 and also finished second in the All Ireland's in 1998 winning four races. His early racing included the British Formula Palmer Audi championship in 2000 which he competed in straight out of karting, in 2001, he competed in British Formula Ford championship for Aztec Racing. O'Brien then signed up for two years in the British SEAT Cupra Championship. In 2005, he competed in the European Alfa Romeo 147 Challenge for PRS racing, where he went on to win the Rookie championship with ten wins.

O'Brien's success led to a test drive for independent BMW team Wiechers-Sport at the German circuit Oschersleben, having impressed enough in the test he was signed to compete in the FIA World Touring Car Championship, with the independent Wiechers-Sport BMW team for 2006. He competed for the first half of the season and left the team after a string of reliability retirements. Late in 2006, he was signed by the GR Asia SEAT Leon team and finished an impressive second in the European Touring Car Cup against the likes of works drivers Alex Zanardi and other FIA World Touring Car Championship regulars.

After impressing by coming second in the 2006 FIA European Touring Car Cup, O'Brien was signed to compete in the 2007. O'Brien drove for GR Asia in the WTCC in a SEAT Leon. The season was a struggle, driving SEAT's first test car the SEAT Leon 001 chassis, with aging equipment and due to no support from the Irish SEAT distributor the season proved difficult and like the previous year, his campaign ended early due to these issues. Like the previous year, O'Brien got a late call to race for the Independent Danish Poulsen Motorsport BMW Team in the FIA European Touring Car Cup in Adria in Italy. Even though O'Brien had not driven since his departure from GR Asia SEAT, he qualified as top BMW driver and finished in fourth place.

In 2008, O'Brien competed in the Danish Touring Car Championship for Poulsen Motorsport in a BMW 320si. O'Brien enjoyed racing in Denmark and had a succsefull end to the championship finishing with two podiums and third place in the Valvoline Finale just behind series champions Jan Magnussen and Michel Nykjaer, O'Brien was representing Coca-Cola in Denmark and carried the striking livery of the Burn Energy brand on his BMW 320si.

== Racing record ==
=== Complete World Touring Car Championship results ===
(key) (Races in bold indicate pole position) (Races in italics indicate fastest lap)

Year	Team	Car	1	2	3	4	5	6	7	8	9	10	11	12	13	14	15	16	17	18	19	20	21	22	DC	Points
2006	Wiechers-Sport	BMW 320i	ITA; 1; 26†	ITA; 2; 15	FRA; 1; 23	FRA; 2; 23	GBR; 1 Ret	GBR; 2; 17	GER; 1 Ret	GER; 2; 24	BRA; 1; 21	BRA; 2 Ret	MEX; 1	MEX; 2	CZE; 1	CZE; 2	TUR; 1	TUR; 2	ESP; 1	ESP; 2	MAC; 1	MAC; 2			NC	0
2007	GR Asia	SEAT León	BRA; 1; 13	BRA; 2 Ret	NED; 1; 18	NED; 2; 20	ESP; 1; 17	ESP; 2; 17	FRA; 1; 17	FRA; 2 Ret	CZE; 1; 16	CZE; 2; 17	POR; 1 Ret	POR; 2; 19	SWE; 1	SWE; 2	GER; 1	GER; 2	GBR; 1	GBR; 2	ITA; 1	ITA; 2	MAC; 1	MAC; 2	NC	0

† — Did not finish the race, but was classified as he completed over 90% of the race distance.
