= James Pickford =

British racing driver (born 1979)

James Knowles Pickford (born 30 April 1979 in Macclesfield, Cheshire) is a British race car driver. As a child, his interest was in motorbikes; his father Keith ran bike racing teams. James started at the beginning in karts in 1994. For a while, he was coached by former BTCC racer Tim Sugden. His interest in saloon and sportscars began when he lost a test in a BTCC car after being nominated for the BRDC McLaren Autosport Young Driver of the Year award in 1998.

Pickford's start in motor racing was in 1997, in the Formula Honda series. He won this two years in a row, and also did a single Formula Ford race in 1998.

After a year working on marketing within the prestigious Abt Sportsline team in the DTM, Pickford returned to full-time racing in 2003, in the SEAT Cupra Championship. He was fifth overall, but improved to win the title in 2004, with 11 top-four finishes in the 12 races including three wins. This earned him a factory British Touring Car Championship SEAT drive in 2005. He came ninth in the series, with a podium at Snetterton but did not retain the drive for 2006. For 2007, he contested the full Porsche Carrera Cup GB, having done the later races in 2006, starting at Knockhill. This means he contested three of the five championships which supported the BTCC and feature on ITV's Motorsport UK programme, as well as the BTCC itself.

== Racing record ==
=== Complete British Touring Car Championship results ===
(key) (Races in bold indicate pole position – 1 point awarded just in first race) (Races in italics indicate fastest lap – 1 point awarded all races) (* signifies that driver lead race for at least one lap – 1 point awarded all races)

Year	Team	Car	1	2	3	4	5	6	7	8	9	10	11	12	13	14	15	16	17	18	19	20	21	22	23	24	25	26	27	28	29	30	DC	Pts
2005	SEAT Sport UK	SEAT Toledo Cupra	DON; 1; 9	DON; 2; 7	DON; 3; 7	THR; 1; 7	THR; 2; 4	THR; 3; 6	BRH; 1; 9	BRH; 2; 8	BRH; 3 DSQ	OUL; 1; 9	OUL; 2; 7	OUL; 3; 7	CRO; 1; 10	CRO; 2; 8	CRO; 3; 4	MON; 1; 11	MON; 2; 9	MON; 3 Ret	SNE; 1; 6	SNE; 2; 9	SNE; 3; 2	KNO; 1 Ret	KNO; 2; 12	KNO; 3 Ret	SIL; 1; 2	SIL; 2; 6	SIL; 3; 8	BRH; 1; 9	BRH; 2; 5	BRH; 3; 2	8th	116

=== Complete British GT Championship results ===
(key) (Races in bold indicate pole position in class) (Races in italics indicate fastest lap in class)

Year	Team	Car	Class	1	2	3	4	5	6	7	8	9	10	DC	Pts
2011	MTECH Racing	Ferrari F430	GT3B	OUL; 1	OUL; 2	SNE	BRH; NC	SPA; 1	SPA; 2	ROC; 1	ROC; 2	DON		36th	0
2011	Backdraft Motorsport	Lamborghini Gallardo LP560	GT3B										SIL; 26	36th	0

Awards and achievements
Preceded by Lewis Hamilton	Autosport; British Club Driver of the Year; 2004	Succeeded by Andrew Kirkaldy
Sporting positions
Preceded by Rob Huff	SEAT Cupra Championship; 2004	Succeeded by Tom Boardman
