= Gavin Smith (racing driver) =

Irish racing driver (born 1977)

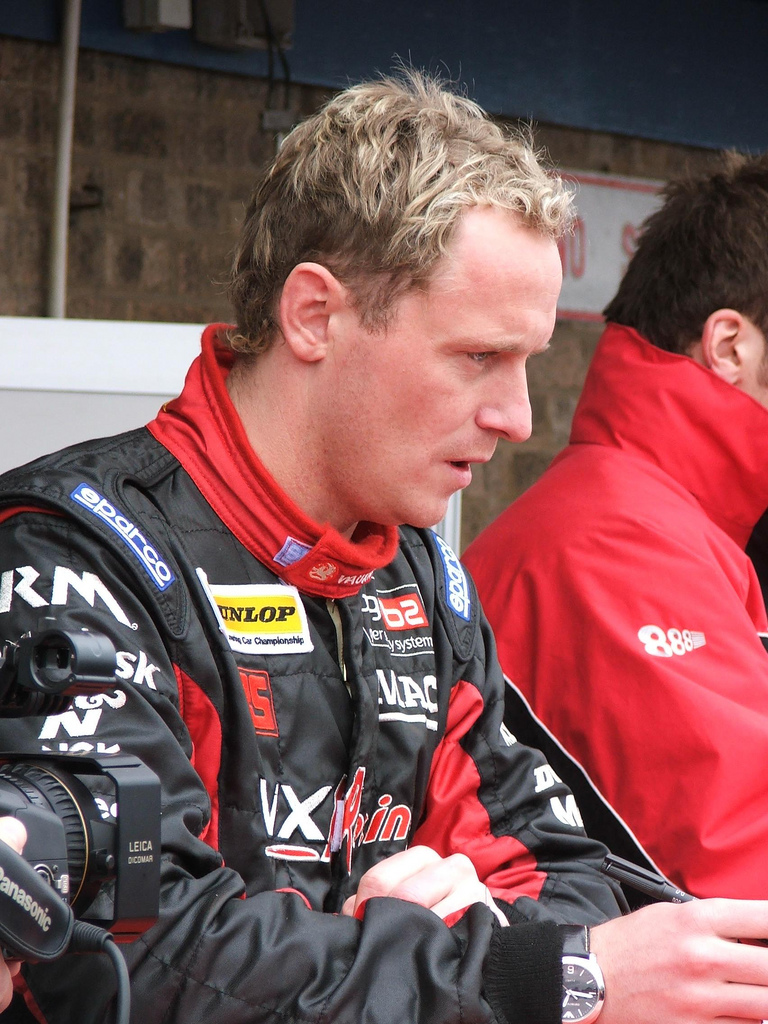
- Smith as a BTCC driver in 2005
- Nationality: (Republic of Ireland) Irish
- Born: 15 September 1977 (age 49) Dublin, Ireland
- Relatives: Árón Taylor-Smith (brother)

British Touring Car Championship career
- Debut season: 2004
- Former teams: GR Asia; VX Racing; Team Sureteam GA Motorsport
- Starts: 63
- Wins: 0
- Poles: 6
- Fastest laps: 2
- Best finish: 8th in 2006

Previous series
- 2004–07 2003–04: BTCC; SEAT Cupra Championship

Gavin Smith (born 15 September 1977) is an Irish racing driver. His younger brother, Árón Taylor-Smith, is also a racing driver who races in the British Touring Car Championship.

== Career ==
Born in Dublin, Smith won Ireland's Fiat Punto championship in 1998, winning 12 times, before trying single-seaters for the next year. In 2000, he was in British Formula Renault, before moving up to the Scholarship class (using year old cars) of Formula 3.

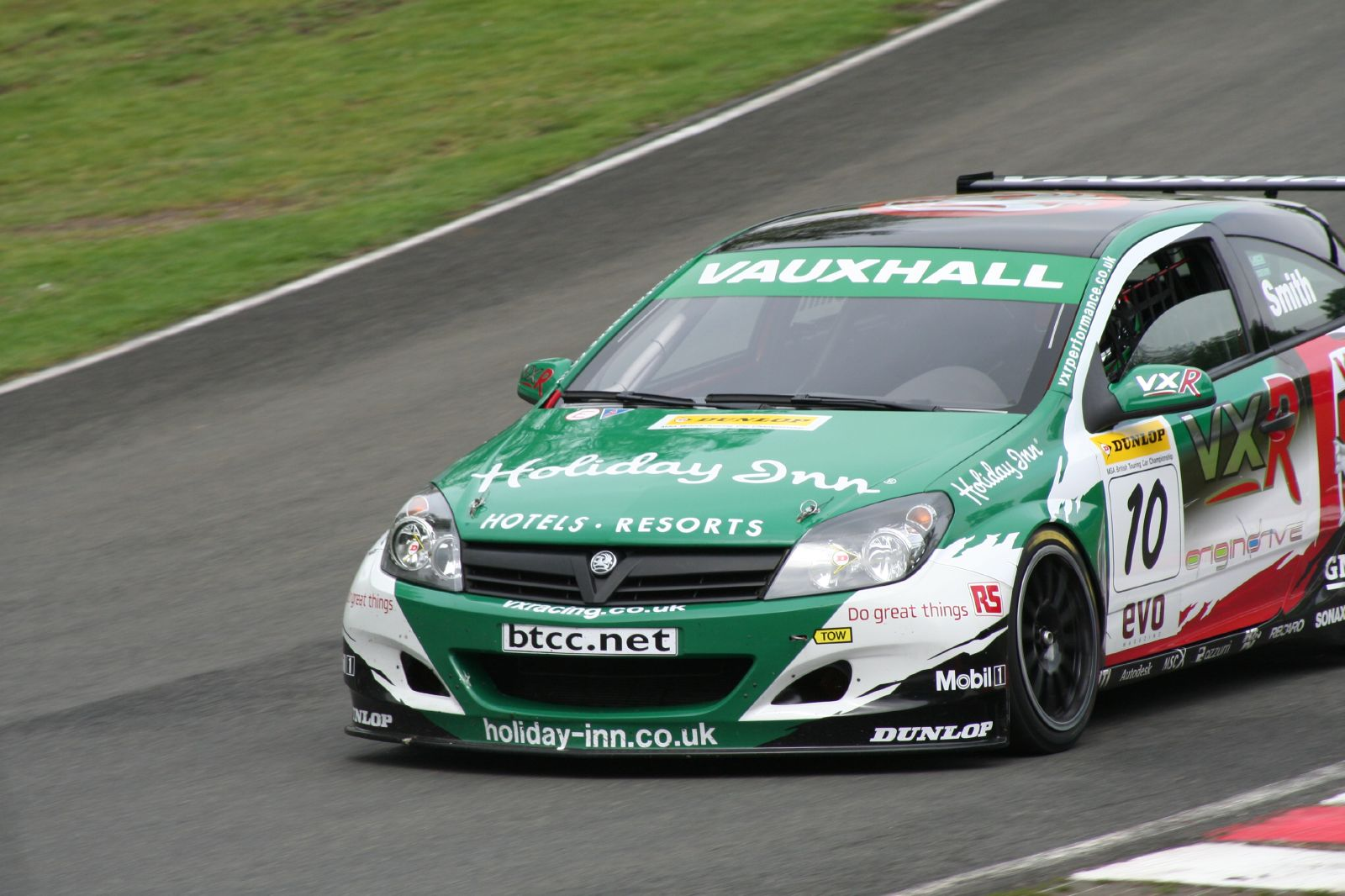
Smith driving for VX Racing at Oulton Park in the 2006 British Touring Car Championship season.

However, it has been in touring cars that Smith has raced since 2003. He had two seasons in the SEAT Cupra Championship, winning four races and coming fifth overall in 2004. By this time, he had already made his BTCC debut in a one-off at Mondello Park, and he tested a VX Racing Vauxhall Astra in early 2005. After impressing the team he earned a drive in their third car, which the team openly admitted is awarded to the best driver who can bring enough money to fund it themselves, rather than necessarily the best available driver.

Smith was tenth overall in 2005, although the fact that he was retained for 2006, while Colin Turkington was fired after finishing sixth, tells its own story. However, he did show signs of improvement late in the season: up until round 9 his best qualifyings were a pair of fourths, and his best race result was a fifth place, whereas in the last two meetings he scored a second and a third, as well as qualifying second in the last round.

In 2006, Smith improved to eighth overall, but lost his drive for 2007 when VX Racing downsized to a two-car team due to the pressures of preparing new-specification Vauxhall Vectras. With three rounds of the 2007 season to go, it was announced that Smith would join GR Asia in alongside Adam Jones, driving a 2007 spec SEAT León. He finished 13th Overall.

Smith's younger brother, Árón, is also a racing driver and made his BTCC début in 2011 for the Triple Eight team, which previously competed under the VX Racing name. Árón raced for Redstone Racing in 2012.

== Racing record ==
=== Complete British Touring Car Championship results ===
(key) (Races in bold indicate pole position – 1 point awarded in first race) (Races in italics indicate fastest lap – 1 point awarded all races) (* signifies that driver lead race for at least one lap – 1 point awarded all races)

Year	Team	Car	1	2	3	4	5	6	7	8	9	10	11	12	13	14	15	16	17	18	19	20	21	22	23	24	25	26	27	28	29	30	Pos	Pts
2004	Team Sureterm GA Motorsports	Vauxhall Astra Coupé	THR; 1	THR; 2	THR; 3	BRH; 1	BRH; 2	BRH; 3	SIL; 1	SIL; 2	SIL; 3	OUL; 1	OUL; 2	OUL; 3	MON; 1 Ret	MON; 2; 9	MON; 3 Ret	CRO; 1	CRO; 2	CRO; 3	KNO; 1	KNO; 2	KNO; 3	BRH; 1	BRH; 2	BRH; 3	SNE; 1	SNE; 2	SNE; 3	DON; 1	DON; 2	DON; 3	**20th**	**2**
2005	VX Racing	Vauxhall Astra Sport Hatch	DON; 1; 8	DON; 2; 6	DON; 3; 5	THR; 1; 9	THR; 2; 10	**THR**; **3** Ret	BRH; 1; 10	BRH; 2; 7	BRH; 3 Ret	OUL; 1; 6	OUL; 2; 11	OUL; 3 Ret	CRO; 1; 8	CRO; 2; 7	CRO; 3 Ret	MON; 1; 7	MON; 2 Ret	MON; 3; 6	SNE; 1; 9	SNE; 2; 11	SNE; 3; 8	KNO; 1; 8	KNO; 2 Ret	KNO; 3 Ret	SIL; 1; 11	SIL; 2; 2	SIL; 3; 11	BRH; 1; 6	BRH; 2; 4	BRH; 3; 3	**10th**	**86**
2006	VX Racing	Vauxhall Astra Sport Hatch	BRH; 1; 6	BRH; 2; 4	BRH; 3; 7	MON; 1; 8	MON; 2; 5	MON; 3; 7	OUL; 1; 8	OUL; 2; 10	OUL; 3; 6	THR; 1; 6	THR; 2; 12	THR; 3; 7	CRO; 1; 9	CRO; 2; 6	**CRO**; **3**; 8*	DON; 1; 6	DON; 2; 2	DON; 3; 5	SNE; 1; 4	SNE; 2 Ret	SNE; 3; 7	KNO; 1 Ret	KNO; 2; 2	KNO; 3; 5	BRH; 1 Ret	BRH; 2 NC	BRH; 3; 10	SIL; 1; 11	SIL; 2; 4	SIL; 3; 10	**8th**	**123**
2007	GR Asia	SEAT León	BRH; 1	BRH; 2	BRH; 3	ROC; 1	ROC; 2	ROC; 3	THR; 1	THR; 2	THR; 3	CRO; 1	CRO; 2	CRO; 3	OUL; 1	OUL; 2	OUL; 3	DON; 1	DON; 2	DON; 3	SNE; 1	SNE; 2	SNE; 3	BRH; 1; 8	BRH; 2; 7	BRH; 3; 7	KNO; 1; 7	KNO; 2; 9	KNO; 3; 11	THR; 1	THR; 2	THR; 3	**13th**	**17**
