= Jay Wheals =

British racing driver (born 1978)

Jay Wheals (born 18 March 1978) is a British racing driver who raced in the British Touring Car Championship (BTCC).

== Racing career ==
Wheals started racing in 1996, in the BRSCC Formula First Championship. After racing in the 1997 Formula Vauxhall Championship, he switched to GT racing in the Marcos Mantis Challenge in 1999. In 2001, he raced a Proton Coupe in the Super Coupe Cup. This was followed in 2002 and 2003 with a drive in the Radical Biduro Championship.

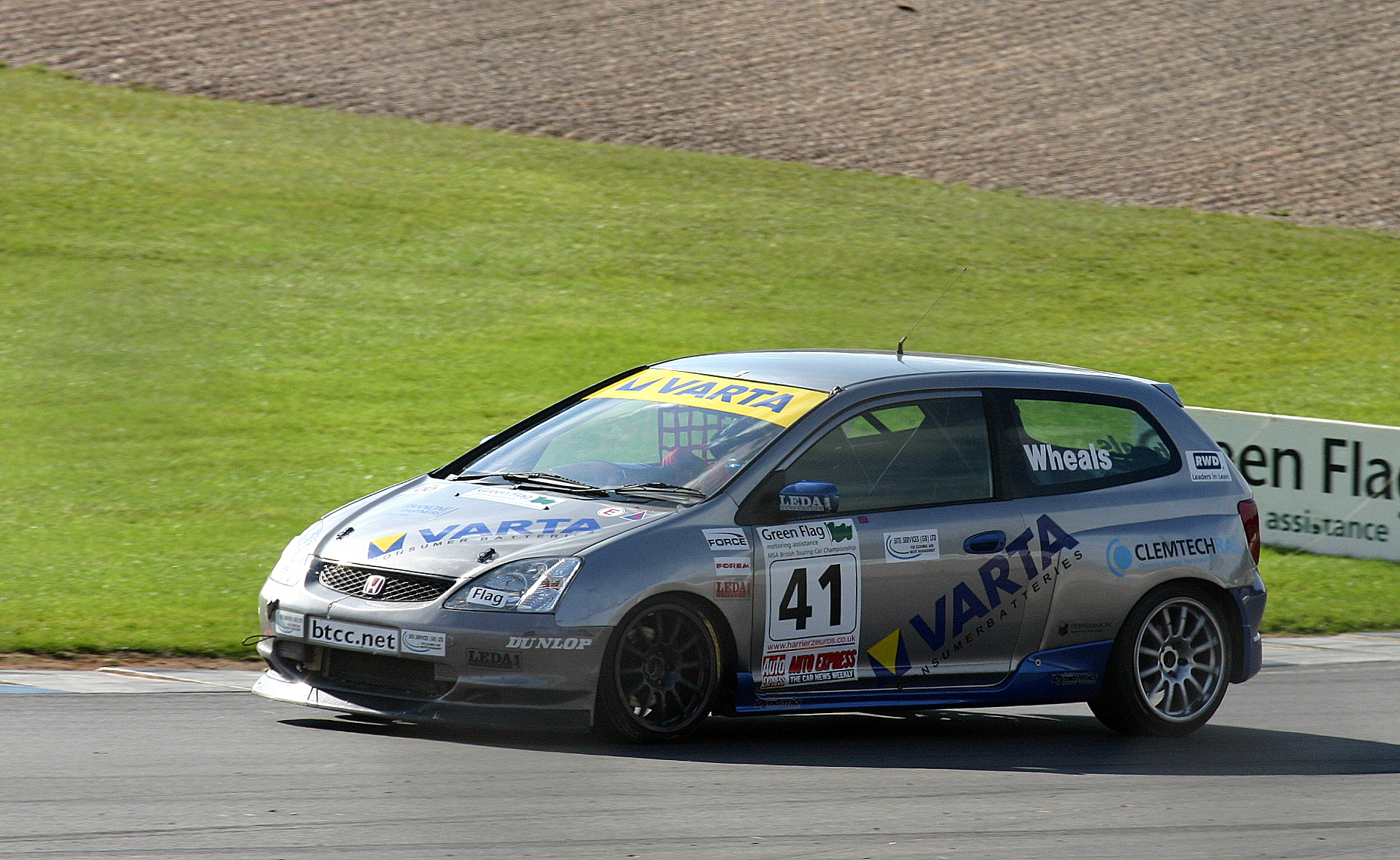
Wheals driving the Team Varta Honda Civic at Donington Park during the 2004 British Touring Car Championship season.

In 2003, Wheals stepped up to the BTCC, driving a part season in the final year of the Production Class in a Peugeot 306, finishing ninth in class. In 2004, he drove in the BTCC again, taking over from Richard Marsh for the final three rounds at Donington Park in a Honda Civic Type R for Team Varta/Quest.

Wheals went back to GT racing in 2005, in Britcar. He drove a Marcos LM600 for DJR Motorsport, and again in 2007.

== Racing record ==
=== Complete British Touring Car Championship results ===
(key) (Races in bold indicate pole position - 1 point awarded in first race, 2003 in class) (Races in italics indicate fastest lap - 1 point awarded all races, 2003 in class) (* signifies that driver lead race for at least one lap - 1 point awarded all races)

Year	Team	Car	Class	1	2	3	4	5	6	7	8	9	10	11	12	13	14	15	16	17	18	19	20	21	22	23	24	25	26	27	28	29	30	Pos	Pts	Class
2003	Team Varta	Peugeot 306 GTi	P	MON; 1	MON; 2	BRH; 1	BRH; 2	THR; 1	THR; 2	SIL; 1	SIL; 2	ROC; 1	ROC; 2	CRO; 1	CRO; 2	SNE; 1 Ret	SNE; 2 ovr:16 cls:4	BRH; 1 ovr:21 cls:5	BRH; 2 ovr:21 cls:6	DON; 1 Ret	DON; 2 ovr:20 cls:4	OUL; 1 Ret	OUL; 2 Ret											N/A	27	9th
2004	Team Quest/Varta	Honda Civic Type-R		THR; 1	THR; 2	THR; 3	BRH; 1	BRH; 2	BRH; 3	SIL; 1	SIL; 2	SIL; 3	OUL; 1	OUL; 2	OUL; 3	MON; 1	MON; 2	MON; 3	CRO; 1	CRO; 2	CRO; 3	KNO; 1	KNO; 2	KNO; 3	BRH; 1	BRH; 2	BRH; 3	SNE; 1	SNE; 2	SNE; 3	DON; 1; 15	DON; 2; 14	DON; 3 DNS	NC	0	
