= 2004 British Touring Car Championship =

47th season of the British Touring Car Championship

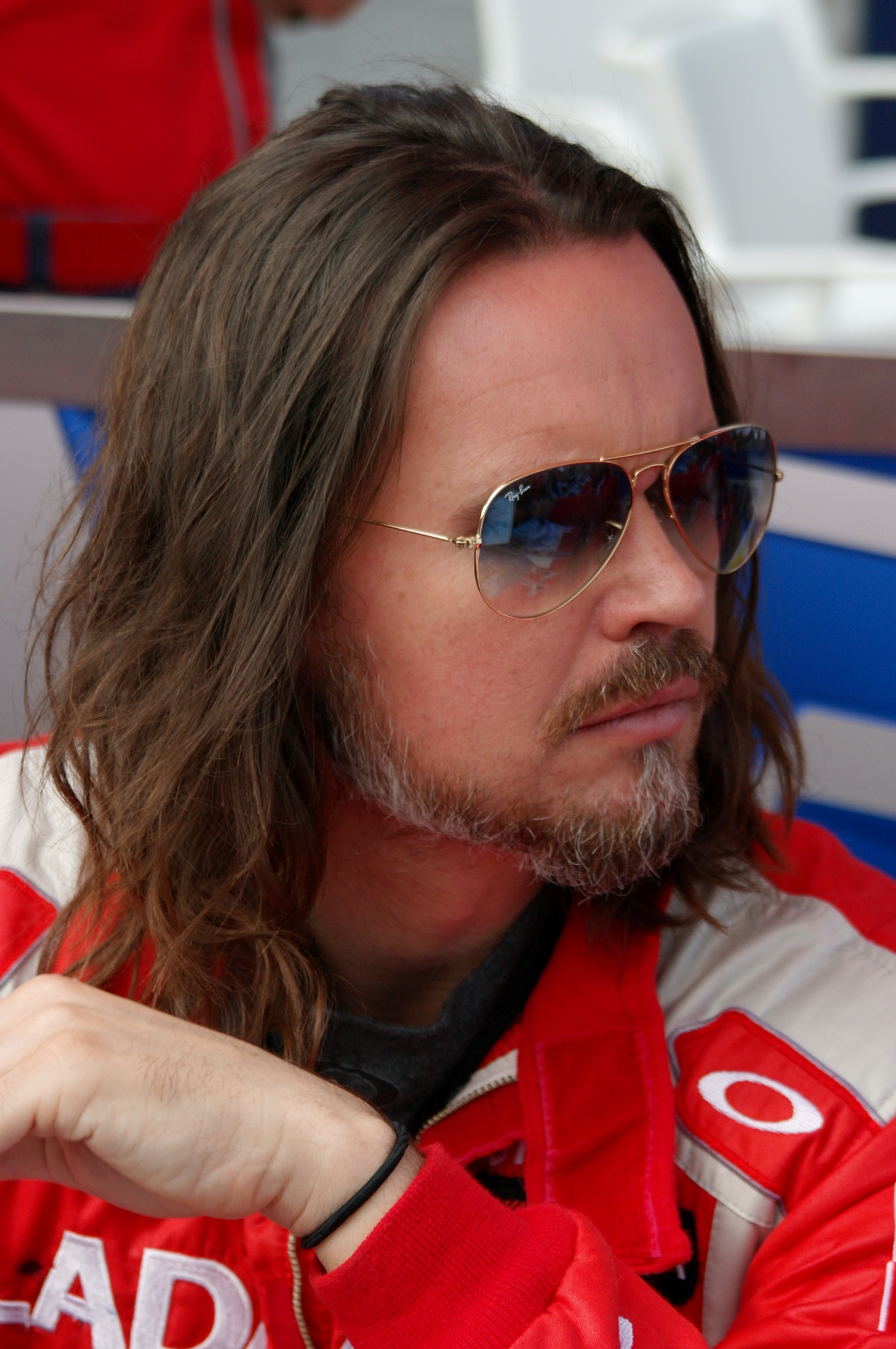
2004 BTCC champion, James Thompson.

The 2004 Green Flag MSA British Touring Car Championship season was the 47th British Touring Car Championship (BTCC) season.

== Changes for 2004 ==
=== Teams and drivers ===
With the admittance of Super 2000-spec cars into the championship, the BTCC welcomed with it a new manufacturer, with SEAT Sport's UK division entering a pair of Toledos identical to those used in the European Touring Car Championship, run by RML. At the wheel were Jason Plato, returning to the championship for the first time since his title victory in 2001, and youngster Rob Huff, who earned his drive through winning the inaugural SEAT Cupra UK Championship, for which Plato had acted as a driver coach.

They were joined by reigning champions of the last three seasons Vauxhall, with Triple 8 Engineering again running a trio of Astra Coupes. 2003 champion Yvan Muller remained along with runner-up and 2002 title winner James Thompson, with Luke Hines replacing Paul O'Neill in the third car on the back of claiming the Production class title in his debut season the previous year.

Honda cut its Arena Motorsport-run Civic Type-R campaign down to a single car for the returning Tom Chilton. A three-car entry was registered on the official entry list with Alan Morrison intended as one of the other drivers but only Chilton's entry would appear all season.

The Civic challenge was augmented by a pair of cars entered by Team Dynamics for Matt Neal, returning to his family team from the works Honda set-up, and Dan Eaves, who brought with him Halfords sponsorship after the withdrawal of Vic Lee Racing. A possible 3rd entry for Gareth Howell was mentioned but didn't come to fruition.

Proton completed the line-up of works teams, its two Impians now driven by two newcomers to British motorsport; the experienced South African Shaun Watson-Smith and the young Malaysian Farique Hairuman.

Financial trouble forced MG Rover to pull its works backing from West Surrey Racing's MG ZS assault, but the team cut down from three to two cars and returned as an independent with young gun Colin Turkington and veteran Anthony Reid staying on board.

Ex-works Vauxhall Astra Coupes were a popular choice amongst the other independents, with Michael Bentwood stepping up from the Production ranks in a 'VXR Junior' team prepared by Tech-Speed Motorsport and 2003 Independents champion Rob Collard continuing to campaign an Astra for his self-run team.

GA Motorsport (now under the 'Team Sureterm' banner) continued to run a pair of Astra Coupes for the returning Paul Wallace and Renault Clio Cup graduate Charlie Butler-Henderson, while a Super 2000-spec Alfa Romeo 156 was also entered for Carl Breeze. Wallace was soon replaced by experienced former Ford and Volvo factory driver Kelvin Burt, then later Irishman Gavin Smith and Stefan Hodgetts (son of ex-BTCC champion Chris), the latter then stepping in to replace Butler-Henderson when his funds ran out. Hodgetts then swapped cars with Breeze, who himself was replaced by Gavin Pyper for the final round.

Synchro Motorsport again returned with an ex-works Honda Civic Type R for former works driver James Kaye. Jason Hughes stepped up from the Production class, racing an ex-WSR MG ZS for his Kartworld Racing team, and John Batchelor's 'Team Varta' also switched classes, running Richard Marsh from the second round onwards in first a Super 2000 Civic Type-R, then later an ex-Vic Lee Racing Peugeot 307. Marsh was replaced by Jay Wheals for the final round, for which the team returned to the Civic.

Mardi Gras Motorsport had an abortive campaign, entering a Super 2000 Civic and later an ex-works Peugeot 406 Coupe, both LPG-powered, for businessman John George, and Edenbridge Racing briefly entered a Super 2000 BMW 320i for Justin Keen.

Carly Motors intended to enter a pair of BMW 320is for ex-Alfa Romeo driver Tom Ferrier and ex-Volvo ETCC driver James Hanson but this entry never materialised.

=== Other changes ===
- The number of total races was increased from 20 to 30 by holding three races at each meeting instead of two
- The grid for the second race of each meeting was decided by the results of the first but with the top ten reversed; the grid for the third race was simply the finishing order of the second race
- Cars built to Super 2000 specification were allowed, with an equivalency formula designed to ensure that they would have similar performance to their BTC Spec counterparts
- Points penalties for engine changes now apply only to the team, not the driver
- The "production class" and its associated championship was abolished

== Teams and drivers ==
Team	Car	No.	Drivers	Rounds
Works BTC-T Entries
VX Racing	Vauxhall Astra Coupé	1	(France) Yvan Muller	All
VX Racing	Vauxhall Astra Coupé	2	(United Kingdom) James Thompson	All
VX Racing	Vauxhall Astra Coupé	57	(United Kingdom) Luke Hines	All
Team Honda	Honda Civic Type-R	9	(United Kingdom) Tom Chilton	All
Petronas Syntium Proton	Proton Impian	15	(Malaysia) Fariqe Hairuman	All
Petronas Syntium Proton	Proton Impian	20	(South Africa) Shaun Watson-Smith	All
Works S2000 Entries
SEAT Sport UK	SEAT Toledo Cupra	11	(United Kingdom) Jason Plato	All
SEAT Sport UK	SEAT Toledo Cupra	12	(United Kingdom) Rob Huff	All
Independent BTC-T Entries
Computeach Racing with Halfords	Honda Civic Type-R	3	(United Kingdom) Matt Neal	All
Computeach Racing with Halfords	Honda Civic Type-R	4	(United Kingdom) Dan Eaves	All
West Surrey Racing	MG ZS	6	(United Kingdom) Anthony Reid	All
West Surrey Racing	MG ZS	8	(United Kingdom) Colin Turkington	All
Collard Racing	Vauxhall Astra Coupé	10	(United Kingdom) Rob Collard	All
VXR Junior	Vauxhall Astra Coupé	14	(United Kingdom) Michael Bentwood	1–6, 8–10
Synchro Motorsport	Honda Civic Type-R	16	(United Kingdom) James Kaye	All
Mardi Gras Motorsport	Peugeot 406 Coupé	17	(United Kingdom) John George	6–10
Team Sureterm	Vauxhall Astra Coupé	21	(United Kingdom) Paul Wallace	1–2
Team Sureterm	Vauxhall Astra Coupé	22	(United Kingdom) Charlie Butler-Henderson	1–4, 6
Team Sureterm	Vauxhall Astra Coupé	23	(United Kingdom) Carl Breeze	8–9
Team Sureterm	Vauxhall Astra Coupé	24	(United Kingdom) Kelvin Burt	3–4
Team Sureterm	Vauxhall Astra Coupé	25	(Republic of Ireland) Gavin Smith	5
Team Sureterm	Vauxhall Astra Coupé	26	(United Kingdom) Stefan Hodgetts	5–6
Team Sureterm	Vauxhall Astra Coupé	44	(United Kingdom) Gavin Pyper	10
Team Quest/Varta	Peugeot 307	40	(United Kingdom) Richard Marsh	8–9
Kartworld Racing	MG ZS	77	(United Kingdom) Jason Hughes	All
Independent S2000 Entries
Mardi Gras Motorsport	Honda Civic Type-R	17	(United Kingdom) John George	1–3
Team Sureterm	Alfa Romeo 156	23	(United Kingdom) Carl Breeze	1–7
Team Sureterm	Alfa Romeo 156	26	(United Kingdom) Stefan Hodgetts	8–10
Team Quest/Varta	Honda Civic Type-R	40	(United Kingdom) Richard Marsh	2–7
Team Quest/Varta	Honda Civic Type-R	41	(United Kingdom) Jay Wheals	10
Edenbridge Racing	BMW 320i	46	(United Kingdom) Justin Keen	2–4

== Season Calendar ==
All races were held in the United Kingdom (excepting Mondello Park round that held in Ireland).

Round		Circuit	Date	Pole position	Fastest lap	Winning driver	Winning team
1	R1	Thruxton Circuit, Hampshire	11 April	(United Kingdom) James Thompson	(United Kingdom) James Thompson	(United Kingdom) James Thompson	VX Racing
1	R2	Thruxton Circuit, Hampshire	11 April		(United Kingdom) Jason Plato	(United Kingdom) Jason Plato	SEAT Sport UK
1	R3	Thruxton Circuit, Hampshire	11 April		(United Kingdom) Colin Turkington	(France) Yvan Muller	VX Racing
2	R4	Brands Hatch (Indy), Kent	25 April	(United Kingdom) Colin Turkington	(United Kingdom) Anthony Reid	(United Kingdom) Matt Neal	Computeach Racing with Halfords
2	R5	Brands Hatch (Indy), Kent	25 April		(South Africa) Shaun Watson-Smith	(United Kingdom) Luke Hines	VX Racing
2	R6	Brands Hatch (Indy), Kent	25 April		(United Kingdom) Matt Neal	(United Kingdom) James Thompson	VX Racing
3	R7	Silverstone Circuit (International), Northamptonshire	9 May	(United Kingdom) Jason Plato	(France) Yvan Muller	(United Kingdom) Matt Neal	Computeach Racing with Halfords
3	R8	Silverstone Circuit (International), Northamptonshire	9 May		(United Kingdom) Colin Turkington	(United Kingdom) James Thompson	VX Racing
3	R9	Silverstone Circuit (International), Northamptonshire	9 May		(United Kingdom) Anthony Reid	(United Kingdom) Tom Chilton	Team Honda
4	R10	Oulton Park (Island), Cheshire	23 May	(United Kingdom) James Thompson	(United Kingdom) James Thompson	(France) Yvan Muller	VX Racing
4	R11	Oulton Park (Island), Cheshire	23 May		(United Kingdom) Dan Eaves	(United Kingdom) Dan Eaves	Computeach Racing with Halfords
4	R12	Oulton Park (Island), Cheshire	23 May		(United Kingdom) James Thompson	(France) Yvan Muller	VX Racing
5	R13	Mondello Park	13 June	(France) Yvan Muller	(United Kingdom) Colin Turkington	(France) Yvan Muller	VX Racing
5	R14	Mondello Park	13 June		(United Kingdom) Anthony Reid	(United Kingdom) Jason Plato	SEAT Sport UK
5	R15	Mondello Park	13 June		(United Kingdom) Anthony Reid	(United Kingdom) Colin Turkington	West Surrey Racing
6	R16	Croft Circuit, Yorkshire	25 July	(United Kingdom) Anthony Reid	(United Kingdom) Anthony Reid	(United Kingdom) Anthony Reid	West Surrey Racing
6	R17	Croft Circuit, Yorkshire	25 July		(United Kingdom) Anthony Reid	(United Kingdom) Jason Plato	SEAT Sport UK
6	R18	Croft Circuit, Yorkshire	25 July		(United Kingdom) Anthony Reid	(United Kingdom) Jason Plato	SEAT Sport UK
7	R19	Knockhill Circuit, Fife	8 August	(United Kingdom) Anthony Reid	(United Kingdom) Colin Turkington	(United Kingdom) Anthony Reid	West Surrey Racing
7	R20	Knockhill Circuit, Fife	8 August		(United Kingdom) Dan Eaves	(United Kingdom) Jason Plato	SEAT Sport UK
7	R21	Knockhill Circuit, Fife	8 August		(United Kingdom) Anthony Reid	(United Kingdom) Anthony Reid	West Surrey Racing
8	R22	Brands Hatch (Indy), Kent	22 August	(United Kingdom) Matt Neal	(United Kingdom) Matt Neal	(United Kingdom) Matt Neal	Computeach Racing with Halfords
8	R23	Brands Hatch (Indy), Kent	22 August		(United Kingdom) Jason Plato	(United Kingdom) Jason Plato	SEAT Sport UK
8	R24	Brands Hatch (Indy), Kent	22 August		(United Kingdom) Robert Huff (South Africa) Shaun Watson-Smith	(United Kingdom) Robert Huff	SEAT Sport UK
9	R25	Snetterton Circuit, Norfolk	5 September	(United Kingdom) James Thompson	(United Kingdom) James Thompson	(United Kingdom) James Thompson	VX Racing
9	R26	Snetterton Circuit, Norfolk	5 September		(United Kingdom) Jason Plato	(United Kingdom) Luke Hines	VX Racing
9	R27	Snetterton Circuit, Norfolk	5 September		(United Kingdom) James Thompson	(United Kingdom) Robert Huff	SEAT Sport UK
10	R28	Donington Park (National), Leicestershire	26 September	(United Kingdom) Jason Plato	(United Kingdom) Jason Plato	(United Kingdom) Jason Plato	SEAT Sport UK
10	R29	Donington Park (National), Leicestershire	26 September		(France) Yvan Muller	(United Kingdom) Tom Chilton	Team Honda
10	R30	Donington Park (National), Leicestershire	26 September		(United Kingdom) James Thompson	(France) Yvan Muller	VX Racing

== Drivers Championship ==
Points system
**1st**	**2nd**	**3rd**	**4th**	**5th**	**6th**	**7th**	**8th**	**9th**	**10th**	Fastest lap	Lead a lap
15	12	10	8	6	5	4	3	2	1	1	1

- No driver may collect more than one "Lead a Lap" point per race no matter how many laps they lead.
- Race 1 polesitter receives 1 point.

(key)

Pos	Driver	THR			BHI			SIL			OUL			MON			CRO			KNO			BHI			SNE			DON			Pts
1	(United Kingdom) James Thompson	**1***	Ret	3	4	2	1*	4	1*	**7***	**2**	5	3	5	2	4	4	4	4	3	Ret	4	3	4	12*	**1***	7	3	2*	5	3	274
2	(France) Yvan Muller	3	2	1*	5	3	3	2	2	Ret	1*	8	1*	**1***	4	6	2	6	5	5	4	9	2	8	5	5	4	2	7	2	1*	273
3	(United Kingdom) Jason Plato	8	1*	**4**	Ret	DNS	Ret	**3***	9	2	8	2	Ret*	9	1*	**Ret***	9	1*	**1***	10	**1***	**7***	9	1*	**2***	11	3	10	**1***	6	2	224
4	(United Kingdom) Anthony Reid	4	6	2	Ret	4	2	6	3	4*	10	**3**	Ret	2	5	9	**1***	8	6	**1***	7	1*	12	Ret	6	8	2	5	5	4	8	213
5	(United Kingdom) Matt Neal	2	Ret	9	1*	DNS	7	1*	8	8	3	4	2	4	10	Ret	3	5	Ret	9	2	8	**1***	5	4	2	Ret	4	Ret	Ret	Ret	181
6	(United Kingdom) Colin Turkington	14	10	6	**6**	5	5	11	5	12	4	6	5	3	6	1*	6	7	3	4	Ret	3	10	**2***	11*	4	5	7	3	7	6	173
7	(United Kingdom) Robert Huff	6	Ret	Ret	2*	11	4	10	**7***	3	7	Ret	Ret	8	DSQ	Ret	5	2	2*	Ret	6	5	7	3	1*	12	8	1*	10	**11**	5	148
8	(United Kingdom) Dan Eaves	5	4*	12	8	8	8	5	6	6	9	1*	**8**	Ret	Ret	3	7	3	12	6	3	2*	Ret	9	Ret	6	11	6	8	3	4	148
9	(United Kingdom) Tom Chilton	10	**Ret**	10	3	6	6	18	10	1*	11	7	6	7	8	5	19	9	7	2	Ret	Ret	6	13	8	3	10	12	9	1*	**12**	116
10	(United Kingdom) Luke Hines	Ret	7	5	9	1*	**10**	8	14	11	Ret	9	11	6	3	2	8	14	8	15	5	6	5	10	7	10	**1***	**8**	6	10	Ret	115
11	(United Kingdom) James Kaye	13	9	7	12	7	Ret	13	15	9	6	12	9	15	7	Ret	Ret	12	13	13	9	11	4	6	Ret	9	6	13	11	9	9	49
12	(United Kingdom) Rob Collard	11	5	8	10	**15**	15	Ret	13	DNS	5	Ret	4	13	11	Ret	15	Ret	9	8	11	Ret	15	Ret	9	7	9	11	13	8	7	44
13	(United Kingdom) Michael Bentwood	7	3	Ret	Ret	DNS	Ret	Ret	12	10	13	11	7	10	**12**	Ret	14	11	11				11	7	3	Ret	14	14	4	Ret	13	42
14	(South Africa) Shaun Watson-Smith	9	8	Ret	7	Ret	9	12	11	14	Ret	14	10	12	Ret	10	13	10	10	7	8	10	8	Ret	Ret	DSQ	12	15	14	12	Ret	28
15	(United Kingdom) Carl Breeze	Ret	Ret	11	Ret	DNS	DNS	7	16	5	Ret	13	Ret	11	Ret	8	11	13	14	Ret	Ret	DNS	13	12	10	14	Ret	Ret				14
16	(United Kingdom) Kelvin Burt							9	4*	Ret	12	Ret	Ret																			11
17	(United Kingdom) Jason Hughes	Ret	12	Ret	14	12	12	Ret	19	17	15	16	12	14	13	7	12	Ret	Ret	11	10	12	14	11	Ret	13	13	16	Ret	13	11	5
18	(United Kingdom) Stefan Hodgetts													Ret	DNS	Ret	10	**Ret**	Ret				Ret	Ret	Ret	Ret	DNS	9	Ret	Ret	10	4
19	(United Kingdom) Justin Keen				13	9	Ret	14	18	16	Ret	15	Ret																			2
20	(Republic of Ireland) Gavin Smith													Ret	9	Ret																2
21	(United Kingdom) Charlie Butler-Henderson	12	11	Ret	11	Ret	11	Ret	Ret	13	Ret	10	Ret				Ret	15	Ret													1
22	(United Kingdom) Paul Wallace	Ret	Ret	Ret	Ret	10	13																									1
23	(Malaysia) Fariqe Hairuman	Ret	DNS	Ret	Ret	13	14	15	17	15	14	17	13	16	Ret	11	16	Ret	Ret	Ret	12	Ret	17	14	Ret	Ret	15	Ret	NC	Ret	DNS	0
24	(United Kingdom) John George	15	13	Ret	Ret	DNS	DNS	17	20	Ret							17	Ret	15	12	13	13	Ret	Ret	Ret	15	16	17	Ret	DNS	DNS	0
25	(United Kingdom) Gavin Pyper																												12	Ret	Ret	0
26	(United Kingdom) Richard Marsh				15	14	16	16	DNS	DNS	Ret	DNS	DNS	17	Ret	DNS	18	16	16	14	14	14	16	Ret	Ret	NC	17	18				0
27	(United Kingdom) Jay Wheals																												15	14	DNS	0
Pos	Driver	THR			BHI			SIL			OUL			MON			CRO			KNO			BHI			SNE			DON			Pts
Sources:

- Note: **bold** signifies pole position (1 point given in first race only, driver who finishes 10th in first race gets pole for race 2 and race 3 pole is for race 2 winner), italics signifies fastest lap (1 point given all races) and * signifies at least one lap in the lead (1 point given all races).

=== Manufacturers Championship ===
Pos	Manufacturer	THR			BHI			SIL			OUL			MON			CRO			KNO			BHI			SNE			DON			Pts
1	Vauxhall / VX Racing	1	2	1	4	1	1	2	1	7	1	5	1	1	2	2	2	4	4	3	4	4	2	4	5	1	1	2	2	2	1	732
1	Vauxhall / VX Racing	3	7	3	5	2	3	4	2	11	2	8	3	5	3	4	4	6	5	5	5	6	3	8	7	5	4	3	6	5	3	732
1	Vauxhall / VX Racing	Ret	Ret	5	9	3	10	8	14	Ret	Ret	9	11	6	4	6	8	14	8	15	Ret	9	5	10	12	10	7	8	7	10	Ret	732
2	Honda / Honda Racing & Computeach Racing with Halfords	2	4	9	1	6	6	1	6	1	3	1	2	4	8	3	3	3	7	2	2	2	1	5	4	2	10	4	8	1	4	548
2	Honda / Honda Racing & Computeach Racing with Halfords	5	Ret	10	3	8	7	5	8	6	9	4	6	7	10	5	7	5	12	6	3	8	6	9	8	3	11	6	9	3	12	548
2	Honda / Honda Racing & Computeach Racing with Halfords	10	Ret	12	8	DNS	8	18	10	8	11	7	8	Ret	Ret	Ret	19	9	Ret	9	Ret	Ret	Ret	13	Ret	6	Ret	12	Ret	Ret	Ret	548
3	SEAT / SEAT Sport UK	6	1	4	2	11	4	3	7	2	7	2	Ret	8	1	Ret	5	1	1	10	1	5	7	1	1	11	3	1	1	6	2	421
3	SEAT / SEAT Sport UK	8	Ret	Ret	Ret	DNS	Ret	10	9	3	8	Ret	Ret	9	DSQ	Ret	9	2	2	Ret	6	7	9	3	2	12	8	10	10	11	5	421
4	Proton / Petronas Syntium Proton	9	8	Ret	7	13	9	12	11	14	14	14	10	12	Ret	10	13	10	10	7	8	10	8	14	Ret	DSQ	12	15	14	12	Ret	96
4	Proton / Petronas Syntium Proton	Ret	DNS	Ret	Ret	Ret	14	15	17	15	Ret	17	13	16	Ret	11	16	Ret	Ret	Ret	12	Ret	17	Ret	Ret	Ret	15	Ret	NC	Ret	DNS	96
Pos	Manufacturer	THR			BHI			SIL			OUL			MON			CRO			KNO			BHI			SNE			DON			Pts

=== Teams Championship ===
Pos	Team	THR			BHI			SIL			OUL			MON			CRO			KNO			BHI			SNE			DON			Pts
1	VX Racing	1	2	1	4	1	1	2	1	7	1	5	1	1	2	2	2	4	4	3	4	4	2	4	5	1	1	2	2	2	1	536
1	VX Racing	3	7	3	5	2	3	4	2	11	2	8	3	5	3	4	4	6	5	5	5	6	3	8	7	5	4	3	6	5	3	536
2	SEAT Sport UK	6	1	4	2	11	4	3	7	2	7	2	Ret	8	1	Ret	5	1	1	10	1	5	7	1	1	11	3	1	1	6	2	360
2	SEAT Sport UK	8	Ret	Ret	Ret	DNS	Ret	10	9	3	8	Ret	Ret	9	DSQ	Ret	9	2	2	Ret	6	7	9	3	2	12	8	10	10	11	5	360
3	West Surrey Racing	4	6	2	6	4	2	6	3	4	4	3	5	2	5	1	1	7	3	1	7	1	10	2	6	4	2	5	3	4	6	325
3	West Surrey Racing	14	10	6	Ret	5	5	11	5	12	10	6	Ret	3	6	9	6	8	6	4	Ret	3	12	Ret	11	8	5	7	5	7	8	325
4	Computeach Racing with Halfords	2	4	9	1	8	7	1	6	6	3	1	2	4	10	3	3	3	12	6	2	2	1	5	4	2	11	4	8	3	4	303
4	Computeach Racing with Halfords	5	Ret	12	8	DNS	8	5	8	8	9	4	8	Ret	Ret	Ret	7	5	Ret	9	3	8	Ret	9	Ret	6	Ret	6	Ret	Ret	Ret	303
5	Team Honda	10	Ret	10	3	6	6	18	10	1	11	7	6	7	8	5	19	9	7	2	Ret	Ret	6	13	8	3	10	12	9	1	12	111
6	Synchro Motorsport	13	9	7	12	7	Ret	13	15	9	6	12	9	15	7	Ret	Ret	12	13	13	9	11	4	6	Ret	9	6	13	11	9	9	54
7	Collard Racing	11	5	8	10	15	15	Ret	13	DNS	5	Ret	4	13	11	Ret	15	Ret	9	8	11	Ret	15	Ret	9	7	9	11	13	8	7	50
8	Team Sureterm	12	11	11	11	10	11	7	4	5	12	10	Ret	11	9	8	10	13	14	Ret	Ret	DNS	13	12	10	14	Ret	9	12	Ret	10	44
8	Team Sureterm	Ret	Ret	Ret	Ret	Ret	13	9	16	13	Ret	13	Ret	Ret	Ret	Ret	11	15	Ret				Ret	Ret	Ret	Ret	DNS	Ret	Ret	Ret	Ret	44
9	VXR Junior	7	3	Ret	Ret	DNS	Ret	Ret	12	10	13	11	7	10	12	Ret	14	11	11				11	7	3	Ret	14	14	4	Ret	13	26
10	Petronas Syntium Proton	9	8	Ret	7	13	9	12	11	14	14	14	10	12	Ret	10	13	10	10	7	8	10	8	14	Ret	DSQ	12	15	14	12	Ret	11
10	Petronas Syntium Proton	Ret	DNS	Ret	Ret	Ret	14	15	17	15	Ret	17	13	16	Ret	11	16	Ret	Ret	Ret	12	Ret	17	Ret	Ret	Ret	15	Ret	NC	Ret	DNS	11
11	Edenbridge Racing				13	9	Ret	14	18	16	Ret	15	Ret																			3
12	Mardi Gras Motorsport	15	13	Ret	Ret	DNS	DNS	17	20	Ret							17	Ret	15	12	13	13	Ret	Ret	Ret	15	16	17	Ret	DNS	DNS	0
13	Team Quest/Varta				15	14	16	16	DNS	DNS	Ret	DNS	DNS	17	Ret	DNS	18	16	16	14	14	14	16	Ret	Ret	NC	17	18	15	14	DNS	0
14	Kartworld Racing	Ret	12	Ret	14	12	12	Ret	19	17	15	16	12	14	13	7	12	Ret	Ret	11	10	12	14	11	Ret	13	13	16	Ret	13	11	-3
Pos	Team	THR			BHI			SIL			OUL			MON			CRO			KNO			BHI			SNE			DON			Pts

=== Independents Championship ===
Pos	Driver	THR			BHI			SIL			OUL			MON			CRO			KNO			BHI			SNE			DON			Pts
1	(United Kingdom) Anthony Reid	**4**	6	2	Ret	4	**2**	6	3	**4**	10	**3**	Ret	**2**	5	**9**	**1**	8	6	**1**	7	1	12	Ret	6	8	2	**5**	5	4	8	312
2	(United Kingdom) Colin Turkington	14	10	6	**6**	5	5	11	5	12	4	6	5	3	6	1	6	7	3	4	Ret	3	10	**2**	**11**	4	5	7	3	7	6	300
3	(United Kingdom) Dan Eaves	5	4	12	8	8	8	5	6	6	9	1	**8**	Ret	Ret	3	7	3	**12**	6	3	2	Ret	9	Ret	6	11	6	8	**3**	**4**	254
4	(United Kingdom) Matt Neal	2	Ret	9	1	DNS	7	**1**	8	8	**3**	4	2	4	10	Ret	3	5	Ret	9	**2**	**8**	**1**	5	4	**2**	Ret	4	**Ret**	Ret	Ret	253
5	(United Kingdom) James Kaye	13	9	7	12	7	Ret	13	15	9	6	12	9	15	7	Ret	Ret	12	13	13	9	11	4	6	Ret	9	**6**	13	11	9	9	164
6	(United Kingdom) Rob Collard	11	5	8	10	**15**	15	Ret	13	DNS	5	Ret	4	13	11	Ret	15	Ret	9	8	11	Ret	15	Ret	9	7	9	11	13	8	7	152
7	(United Kingdom) Michael Bentwood	7	**3**	**Ret**	Ret	DNS	Ret	Ret	12	10	13	11	7	10	**12**	Ret	14	11	11				11	7	3	Ret	14	14	4	Ret	13	131
8	(United Kingdom) Jason Hughes	Ret	12	Ret	14	12	12	Ret	19	17	15	16	12	14	13	7	12	Ret	Ret	11	10	12	14	11	Ret	14	13	16	Ret	13	11	89
9	(United Kingdom) Carl Breeze	Ret	Ret	11	Ret	DNS	DNS	7	16	5	Ret	13	Ret	11	Ret	8	11	13	14	Ret	Ret	DNS	13	12	10	15	Ret	Ret				75
10	(United Kingdom) Charlie Butler-Henderson	12	11	Ret	11	Ret	11	Ret	Ret	13	Ret	10	Ret				Ret	15	Ret													33
11	(United Kingdom) John George	15	13	Ret	Ret	DNS	DNS	17	20	Ret							17	Ret	15	12	13	13	Ret	Ret	Ret	16	16	17	Ret	DNS	DNS	27
12	(United Kingdom) Richard Marsh				15	14	16	16	DNS	DNS	Ret	DNS	DNS	17	Ret	DNS	18	16	16	14	14	14	16	Ret	Ret	NC	17	18				27
13	(United Kingdom) Kelvin Burt							9	**4**	Ret	12	Ret	Ret																			22
14	(United Kingdom) Justin Keen				13	9	Ret	14	18	16	Ret	15	Ret																			18
15	(United Kingdom) Stefan Hodgetts													Ret	DNS	Ret	10	**Ret**	Ret				Ret	Ret	Ret	Ret	DNS	9	Ret	Ret	10	17
16	(United Kingdom) Paul Wallace	Ret	Ret	Ret	Ret	10	13																									9
17	(Republic of Ireland) Gavin Smith													Ret	9	Ret																8
18	(United Kingdom) Jay Wheals																												15	14	DNS	7
19	(United Kingdom) Gavin Pyper																												12	Ret	Ret	5
Pos.	Driver	THR			BHI			SIL			OUL			MON			CRO			KNO			BHI			SNE			DON			Pts
