= Shaun Watson-Smith =

South African racing driver (born 1970)

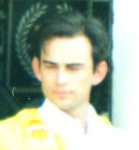
Watson-Smith, deputising for Michael Briggs in the South African Group A Touring Car series, late 1995

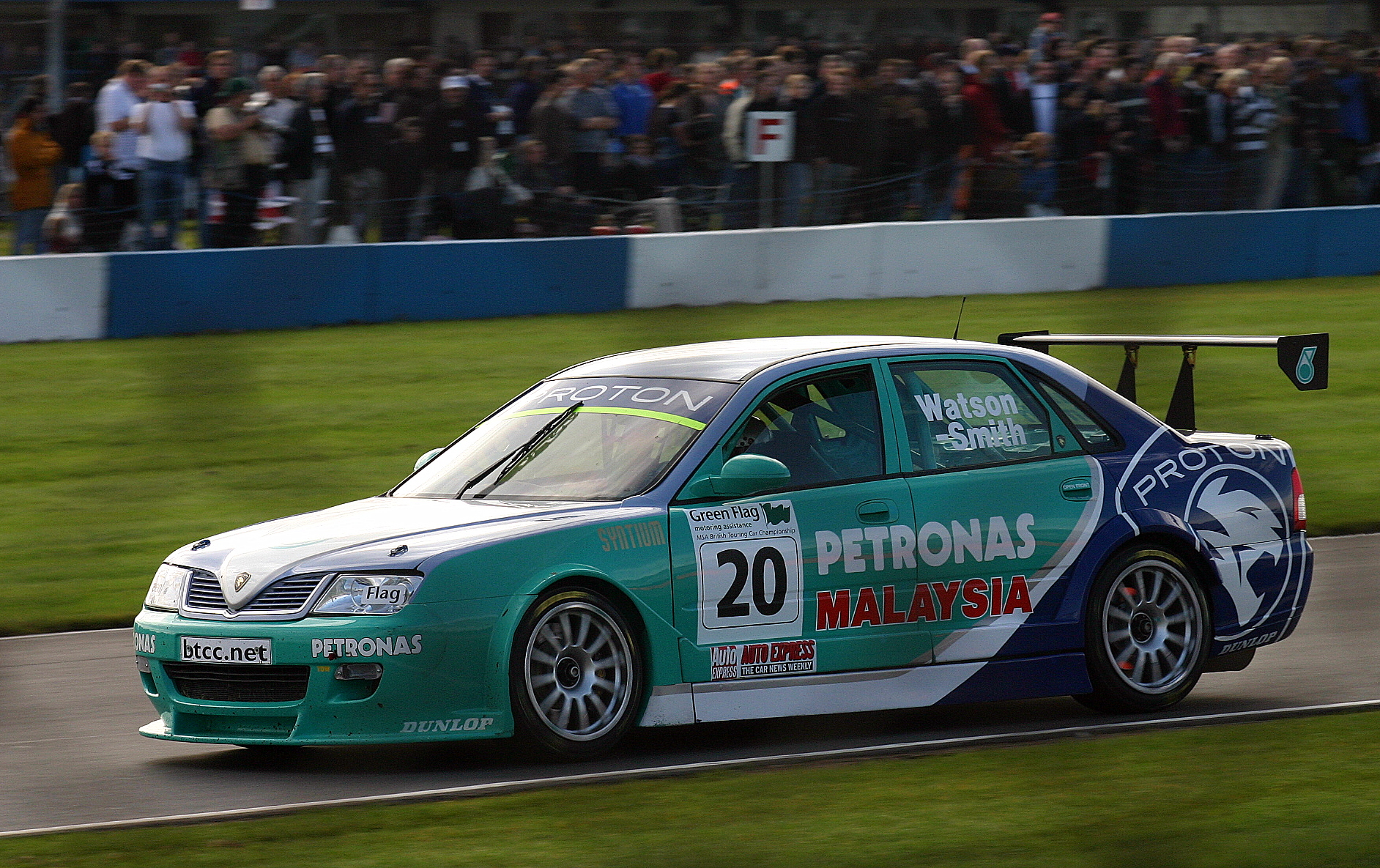
Watson-Smith driving for Proton at Donington Park during the 2004 British Touring Car Championship season.

Shaun Watson-Smith (born 6 February 1970 in Port Elizabeth) is a South African racing driver who has mainly raced in Touring Cars. He first entered the national production car championship in 1991, winning the overall championship a year later in 1992. In 1994, he got a works drive for the Opel team, helping to develop the new car. He was class B champion in 1995 driving his Opel two-litre Astra and also won his debut race in the South African Touring Car Championship. After finishing third in class in 1996, he went on to dominate the championship winning the title in 1997 and 1998. In 1999, he drove in the South African Touring Car Championship, finishing tenth on points in a Petronas Opel Vectra. He went on to finish second in the final full year of the championship. From 2001 through to 2003, he raced in the WesBank V8 Series, driving an Opel Astra. He never raced a full season, but won several selected races that he drove in.

In 2004, Watson-Smith got his big break in the British Touring Car Championship driving a works Proton Impian for Petronas Syntium Proton, alongside teammate Fariqe Hairuman. He impressed many people with his driving and pace that season, but the team was under-funded and the car was well off the pace of the other works teams. He placed fourteenth on points and at the end of the season Proton withdrew from the championship and he returned to South Africa.

== Racing record ==
=== Complete British Touring Car Championship results ===
(key) (Races in bold indicate pole position - 1 point awarded in first race) (Races in italics indicate fastest lap - 1 point awarded all races) (* signifies that driver lead race for at least one lap - 1 point awarded all races)

Year	Team	Car	1	2	3	4	5	6	7	8	9	10	11	12	13	14	15	16	17	18	19	20	21	22	23	24	25	26	27	28	29	30	DC	Pts
2004	Petronas Syntium Proton	Proton Impian	THR; 1; 9	THR; 2; 8	THR; 3 Ret	BRH; 1; 7	BRH; 2 Ret	BRH; 3; 9	SIL; 1; 12	SIL; 2; 11	SIL; 3; 14	OUL; 1 Ret	OUL; 2; 14	OUL; 3; 10	MON; 1; 12	MON; 2 Ret	MON; 3; 10	CRO; 1; 13	CRO; 2; 10	CRO; 3; 10	KNO; 1; 7	KNO; 2; 8	KNO; 3; 10	BRH; 1; 8	BRH; 2 Ret	BRH; 3 Ret	SNE; 1 DSQ	SNE; 2; 12	SNE; 3; 15	DON; 1; 14	DON; 2; 12	DON; 3 Ret	**14th**	**28**
