= Richard Marsh (racing driver) =

British racing driver (born 1967)

- Nationality: (United Kingdom) British

Previous series
- 2003-2007: British Touring Car Championship

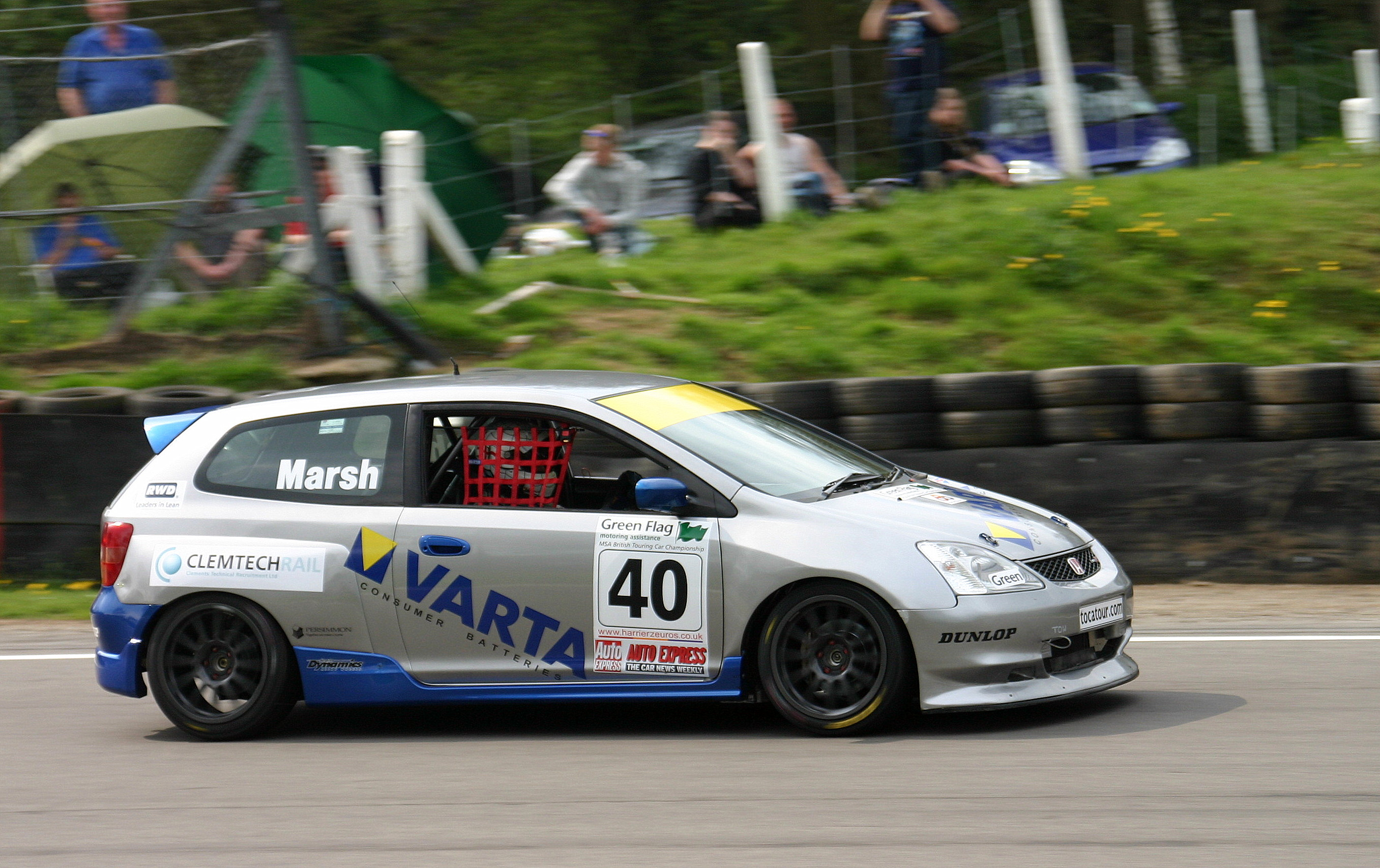
Marsh driving the Team Varta Honda Civic at Brands Hatch during the 2004 British Touring Car Championship season.

Richard Marsh (born 24 September 1967) is an auto racing driver from Derbyshire, England. After competing in the Ford Fiesta championship and the Porsche Carrera Cup, he graduated to the production class of the British Touring Car Championship midway through the 2003 season with John Batchelor's Team Varta squad. He remained with the team for 2004 in the Touring Class, initially driving a Honda Civic Type-R but subsequently a Peugeot 307. For 2006, he rejoined the BTCC at its halfway point again driving a Peugeot 307 entered by Team Griffin Motorsport with sponsorship from Farécla. He did not score any points in his first race back, and the team missed several races due to unreliable machinery. For the final round, they converted the car to bio-ethanol, qualifying ahead of 6 other cars. For 2007, he and David Pinkney teamed up to drive Alfa Romeo cars for Gary Ayles in the series. He scored no points, and missed the final two rounds following the multiple collision at Brands Hatch. He is no longer racing in the series.

== Racing record ==
=== Complete British Touring Car Championship results ===
(key) (Races in bold indicate pole position – 1 point awarded in first race, 2003 in class) (Races in italics indicate fastest lap – 1 point awarded all races, 2003 in class) (* signifies that driver lead race for at least one lap – 1 point awarded all races)

Year	Team	Car	Class	1	2	3	4	5	6	7	8	9	10	11	12	13	14	15	16	17	18	19	20	21	22	23	24	25	26	27	28	29	30	Pos	Pts	Class
2003	Team Varta	Peugeot 306 GTi	P	MON; 1	MON; 2	BRH; 1	BRH; 2	THR; 1	THR; 2	SIL; 1	SIL; 2	ROC; 1	ROC; 2	CRO; 1 ovr:18 cls:5	CRO; 2 ovr:17 cls:4																			N/A	46	11th
2003	Team Varta	Honda Accord	P													SNE; 1 Ret	SNE; 2 Ret	BRH; 1 ovr:22 cls:6	BRH; 2 ovr:22 cls:7	DON; 1 ovr:20 cls:6	DON; 2 ovr:21 cls:5	OUL; 1 ovr:19 cls:4	OUL; 2 ovr:19 cls:7											N/A	46	11th
2004	Team Quest/Varta	Honda Civic Type-R		THR; 1	THR; 2	THR; 3	BRH; 1; 15	BRH; 2; 14	BRH; 3; 16	SIL; 1; 16	SIL; 2 DNS	SIL; 3 DNS	OUL; 1 Ret	OUL; 2 DNS	OUL; 3 DNS	MON; 1; 17	MON; 2 Ret	MON; 3 DNS	CRO; 1; 18	CRO; 2; 16	CRO; 3; 16	KNO; 1; 14	KNO; 2; 14	KNO; 3; 14										NC	0	
2004	Team Quest/Varta	Peugeot 307																							BRH; 1; 16	BRH; 2 Ret	BRH; 3 Ret	SNE; 1 NC	SNE; 2; 17	SNE; 3; 18	DON; 1	DON; 2	DON; 3	NC	0	
2006	Team Farécla	Peugeot 307		BRH; 1	BRH; 2	BRH; 3	MON; 1	MON; 2	MON; 3	OUL; 1	OUL; 2	OUL; 3	THR; 1	THR; 2	THR; 3	CRO; 1	CRO; 2	CRO; 3	DON; 1; 18	DON; 2 Ret	DON; 3 DNS	SNE; 1 DNS	SNE; 2 DNS	SNE; 3 DNS	KNO; 1 Ret	KNO; 2 DNS	KNO; 3 Ret	BRH; 1 DNS	BRH; 2 DNS	BRH; 3 DNS	SIL; 1; 17	SIL; 2; 12	SIL; 3; 14	NC	0	
2007	A-Tech	Alfa Romeo 156		BRH; 1 Ret	BRH; 2; 17	BRH; 3; 17	ROC; 1 Ret	ROC; 2 DNS	ROC; 3 DNS	THR; 1; 16	THR; 2 Ret	THR; 3 Ret	CRO; 1; 18	CRO; 2 Ret	CRO; 3 DNS	OUL; 1 Ret	OUL; 2 DNS	OUL; 3 Ret	DON; 1; 13	DON; 2; 18	DON; 3; 17	SNE; 1; 14	SNE; 2 Ret	SNE; 3 DNS	BRH; 1; 12	BRH; 2; 11	BRH; 3; 13	KNO; 1	KNO; 2	KNO; 3	THR; 1	THR; 2	THR; 3	NC	0	
