= Steve Sutcliffe =

British racing driver (born 1968)

Steve Sutcliffe (born in 1968) is a former British motor racing driver who now works as a motoring journalist. His first serious racing took place in 1993 in the Caterham K Series Championship, where he finished the season second in points. In 1998, he raced in the TVR Tuscan Challenge, finishing eighth. He finished fourth in the 1999 season, and sixth in 2000 with two poles and three race wins.

In 2001, Sutcliffe got a drive in the British Touring Car Championship, replacing Thomas Erdos for the final two races at Brands Hatch, in a Lexus IS200 for ABG Motorsport/Total Motorsport. He finished ninth on the road (eighth in class) in Race 1 and retired from Race 2 but he was a guest driver and thus was ineligible for points. He was due to drive for Total Motorsport full-time in the 2002 BTCC with Richard Dean as his team-mate but nothing came of this.

In 2007, Sutcliffe set competitive times around the National Circuit at Silverstone in Honda's RA 107 Formula One car, and managed speeds of 178 mph along the back straight. He did it in 48.58 seconds compared to Honda F1 test driver James Rossiter 48.18 seconds.

After a long career with Autocar magazine, Sutcliffe has now gone freelance with work appearing in EVO magazine & Autocar's main rival, Auto Express amongst others.

== Racing record ==
=== Complete British Touring Car Championship results ===
(key) (Races in bold indicate pole position - 1 point awarded all races) (Races in italics indicate fastest lap - 1 point awarded all races) (* signifies that driver lead feature race for at least one lap - 1 point awarded)

Year	Team	Car	Class	1	2	3	4	5	6	7	8	9	10	11	12	13	14	15	16	17	18	19	20	21	22	23	24	25	26	DC	Pts
2001	Total Motorsport	Lexus IS200	T	BRH; 1	BRH; 2	THR; 1	THR; 2	OUL; 1	OUL; 2	SIL; 1	SIL; 2	MON; 1	MON; 2	DON; 1	DON; 2	KNO; 1	KNO; 2	SNE; 1	SNE; 2	CRO; 1	CRO; 2	OUL; 1	OUL; 2	SIL; 1	SIL; 2	DON; 1	DON; 2	BRH; 1 ovr:9† cls:8†	BRH; 2 Ret	NC	0

† Not eligible for points.
