= Phil Bennett (racing driver) =

British racing driver (born 1971)

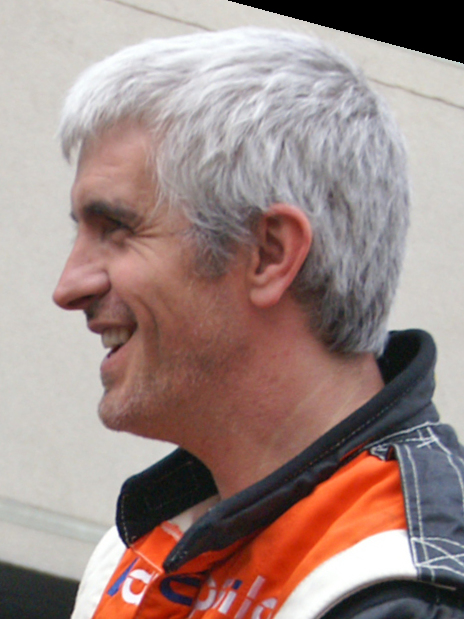
- Bennett pictured at the Drivers' Parade for the 2009 24 Hours of Le Mans.
- Born: Philip Bennett; 6 October 1971 (age 55) Kingswinford, West Midlands, England

24 Hours of Le Mans career
- Debut season: 2005
- Years active: 2005, 2009
- Teams: Kruse Motorsport; Team Barazi-Epsilon
- Wins: 0
- Best finish: 24th in 2005

Previous series
- 2007, 2010 2001-2003: Britcar Endurance; British Touring Car Championship

Philip Bennett (born 6 October 1971 in Kingswinford) is a British racing driver who last competed in the 2010 Britcar Endurance Championship for Wessex Vehicles.

== Career ==
Bennett started circuit racing in 1998 with a one make Rover 216GTi, racing in the BRSCC Super Coupe Cup - finishing second. He then finished third in the 1999 Renault Spider Cup. In 2001, he joined Team Egg Sport to race a Vauxhall Astra in the BTCC, in the first year of BTC-Touring regulations. Against a thin field he came fourth overall, behind only the other Vauxhalls of Jason Plato, Yvan Muller and James Thompson. For 2002 and 2003, he raced for Proton's unsuccessful factory team. He also made a one-off appearance in the RenaultSport Clio Trophy at Donington in 2002

In 2004, Bennett raced in the Le Mans Endurance Series (LMES) in a GTS Saleen S7-R, whilst 2005 he moved to sportscars and a Courage C-65 LMP2 machine, racing in the LMES, Le Mans 24hrs, Sebring 12hr (ALMS) and Petit Le Mans. In 2006, he won a V8Star race at Donington Park.

Bennett has appeared on the TV show Faking It, helping a young man pretend to be a professional racing driver.

Bennett is now a fully qualified flying instructor and owner of Silverstone-based Gyrocopter Flying Club.

== Racing record ==
=== Complete British Touring Car Championship results ===
(key) (Races in bold indicate pole position - 1 point awarded) (Races in italics indicate fastest lap - 1 point awarded) * signifies that driver lead race for at least one lap - 1 point awarded (2001-2002 just for feature race, 2003 all races)

Year	Team	Car	Class	1	2	3	4	5	6	7	8	9	10	11	12	13	14	15	16	17	18	19	20	21	22	23	24	25	26	Pen.	Pos	Pts
2001	egg:sport	Vauxhall Astra Coupé	T	BRH; 1; 4†	BRH; 2 ovr:3* cls:3	THR; 1 ovr:4 cls:4	THR; 2 ovr:3* cls:3	OUL; 1 ovr:11 cls:4	OUL; 2 Ret	SIL; 1 ovr:6 cls:4	SIL; 2 ovr:2 cls:2	MON; 1 ovr:15 cls:6	MON; 2 ovr:4 cls:4	DON; 1 ovr:4 cls:4	DON; 2 Ret	KNO; 1 ovr:9 cls:5	KNO; 2 ovr:2* cls:2	SNE; 1 Ret	SNE; 2 ovr:6 cls:6	**CRO**; **1** ovr:19 cls:7	CRO; 2 Ret	OUL; 1	OUL; 2	**SIL**; **1** ovr:1 cls:1	**SIL**; **2** Ret*	DON; 1 ovr:4 cls:1	DON; 2 Ret	BRH; 1 ovr:6 cls:5	BRH; 2 ovr:1* cls:1		4th	173
2002	Petronas Syntium Proton	Proton Impian	T	BRH; 1 ovr:11 cls:7	BRH; 2 ovr:6 cls:6	OUL; 1 Ret	OUL; 2 DNS	THR; 1 ovr:14 cls:14	THR; 2 Ret	SIL; 1 ovr:7 cls:7	SIL; 2 ovr:13 cls:13	MON; 1 ovr:8 cls:8	MON; 2 ovr:9 cls:9	CRO; 1 ovr:12 cls:10	CRO; 2 ovr:8 cls:8	SNE; 1 ovr:8 cls:8	SNE; 2 ovr:18 cls:12	KNO; 1 Ret	KNO; 2 DNS	BRH; 1 ovr:7 cls:7	BRH; 2 ovr:12 cls:11	DON; 1 ovr:8 cls:8	DON; 2 ovr:9 cls:9							-25	16th	9
2003	Petronas Syntium Proton	Proton Impian	T	MON; 1 Ret	MON; 2 Ret	BRH; 1 ovr:10 cls:10	BRH; 2 Ret	THR; 1 ovr:14 cls:12	THR; 2 ovr:9 cls:9	SIL; 1 Ret	SIL; 2 Ret	ROC; 1 ovr:12 cls:12	ROC; 2 ovr:8 cls:8	CRO; 1 ovr:10 cls:10	CRO; 2 ovr:15 cls:13	SNE; 1 ovr:9 cls:9	SNE; 2 Ret	BRH; 1 Ret	BRH; 2 ovr:9 cls:9	DON; 1 Ret	DON; 2 ovr:12 cls:12	OUL; 1 ovr:9 cls:9	OUL; 2 ovr:10 cls:10								17th	14

† Event with 2 races staged for the different classes.

== 24 Hours of Le Mans results ==
Year	Team	Co-Drivers	Car	Class	Laps	Pos.	Class Pos.
2005	(Germany) Kruse Motorsport	(United Kingdom) Tim Mullen (United Kingdom) Ian Mitchell	Courage C65-Judd	LMP2	268	24th	4th
2009	(France) Barazi-Epsilon	(Denmark) Juan Barazi (United Kingdom) Stuart Moseley	Zytek 07S/2	LMP2	306	28th	4th

== Britcar 24 Hour results ==
Year	Team	Co-Drivers	Car	Car No.	Class	Laps	Pos.	Class Pos.
2007	(United Kingdom) KTF Group	(United Kingdom) Mark Dwyer (United Kingdom) Ken Finneran (United Kingdom) Robert Huff	Chrysler Viper GTS-R	6	GT3	142	DNF	DNF
2010	(United Kingdom) Wessex Vehicles	(United Kingdom) Kelvin Burt (United Kingdom) Rob Huff (United Kingdom) Nigel Mustill	Aquila CR1	3	1	178	DNF	DNF
