= BTC-T Peugeot 307 =

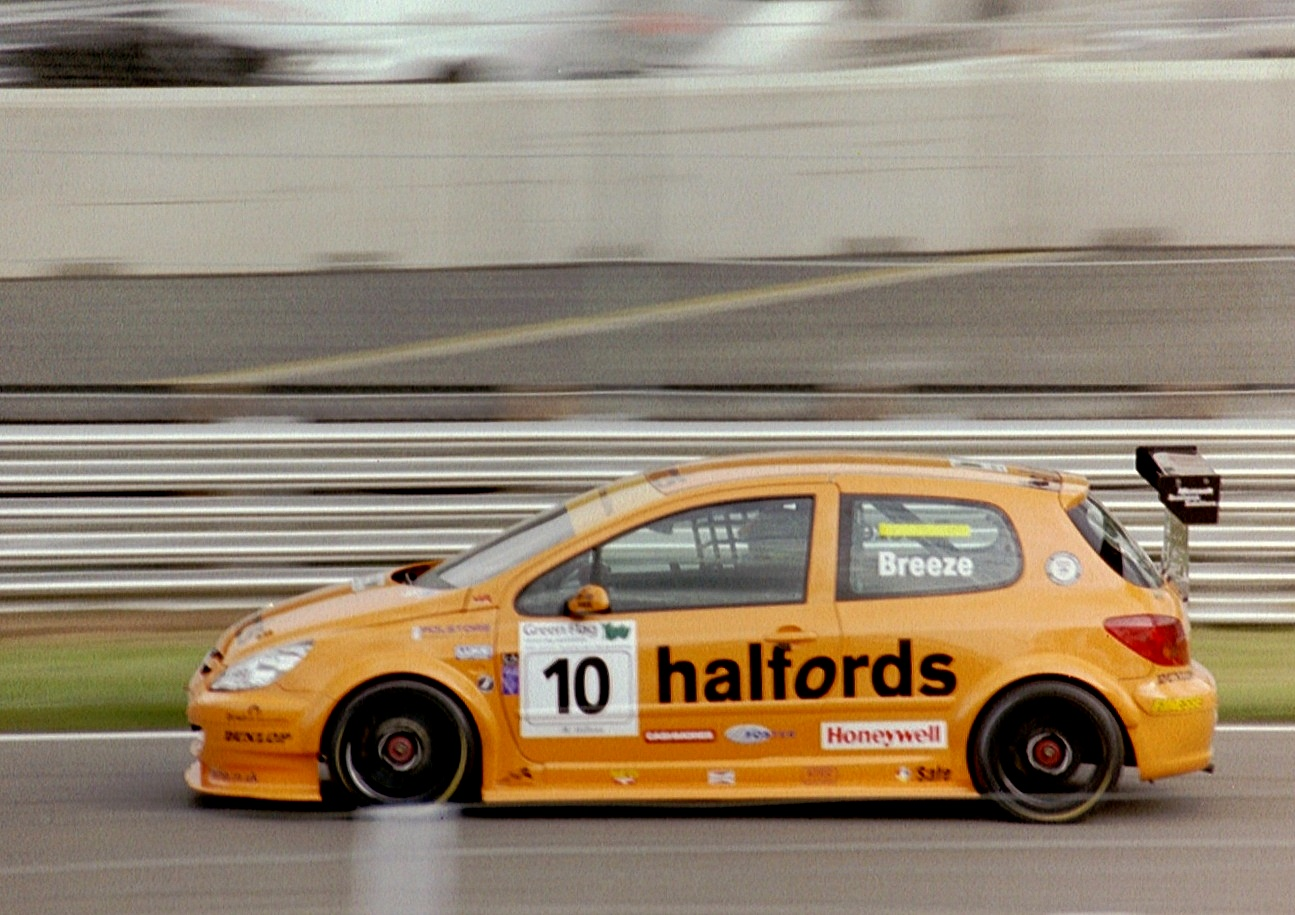
- Carl Breeze at Brands Hatch in 2003
- Category: BTCC
- Constructor: Vic Lee Racing

Technical specifications
- Chassis: Peugeot 307
- Length: 4,200 mm (165.4 in)
- Width: 1,750 mm (68.9 in)
- Height: 1,500 mm (59.1 in)
- Axle track: 1,750 mm (68.9 in)
- Wheelbase: 2,600 mm (102.4 in)
- Engine: 2,000 cc (122.0 cu in) 270 hp (201 kW; 274 PS) In-line 4 NA front-mounted, FWD
- Transmission: Xtrac 6-speed Sequential
- Weight: 1,150 kg (2,535.3 lb) (with driver)
- Tyres: Dunlop

Competition history
- Notable entrants: Team Halfords; Team Quest/Varta; Team Farécla
- Notable drivers: Dan Eaves; Carl Breeze; Danny Buxton; Richard Marsh
- Debut: 2003 BTCC at Mondello Park
Races	Wins	Poles	F/Laps
41	0	0	0
- Teams' Championships: 0
- Constructors' Championships: 0
- Drivers' Championships: 0

The BTC-T Peugeot 307 is a BTC-Touring class racing car that was built for the 2003 British Touring Car Championship season by Vic Lee Racing.

== Team Halfords ==
After two unsuccessful seasons of running the BTC-T Peugeot 406 Coupe, Team Halfords decided to switch to the Peugeot 307. Designed by renowned Formula One designer Sergio Rinland, the 307 was the second BTC Touring spec car built by the Coventry-based firm. Two cars were built, and both appeared for the first rounds of 2003 at Mondello Park, initially driven by Dan Eaves and Carl Breeze, although Breeze was replaced by Daniel Buxton halfway through the season. The 307 struggled at the start of the season, but became slightly more competitive as the season went on, Eaves eventually finishing 4th in the Independents championship. However, in 2004, Eaves moved to Team Dynamics, taking the Halfords sponsorship with him.

== Later career ==
Initially unused in 2004, one of the cars was used by Richard Marsh in round 8 and 9, after struggling in a Super 2000-spec Honda Civic. The car did not reappear again in 2005, but in 2006, Marsh once again drove the car, this time for Team Farécla in the last 4 rounds of the championship. Marsh was plagued by problems in the underdeveloped 307, suffering many mechanical issues that prevented him from finishing races, or even starting them. The car did not appear again in 2007.

== Chassis History ==
Car 1

- 2003 - Dan Eaves
- 2004 - Richard Marsh | Marsh: Rounds 21-27
- 2006 - Richard Marsh | Marsh: Rounds 16-24/28-30
- 2008 - Nick Beaumont/Mark Clynes - Britcar Production S1

Car 2

- 2003 - Carl Breeze/Daniel Buxton | Breeze: Rounds 1-10, Buxton: Rounds 11-20
- 2004 onwards - Hillclimbing and sprinting
- 2007 onwards - Peugeot Ecosse trackday car
