= Fariqe Hairuman =

Malaysian racing driver (born 1983)

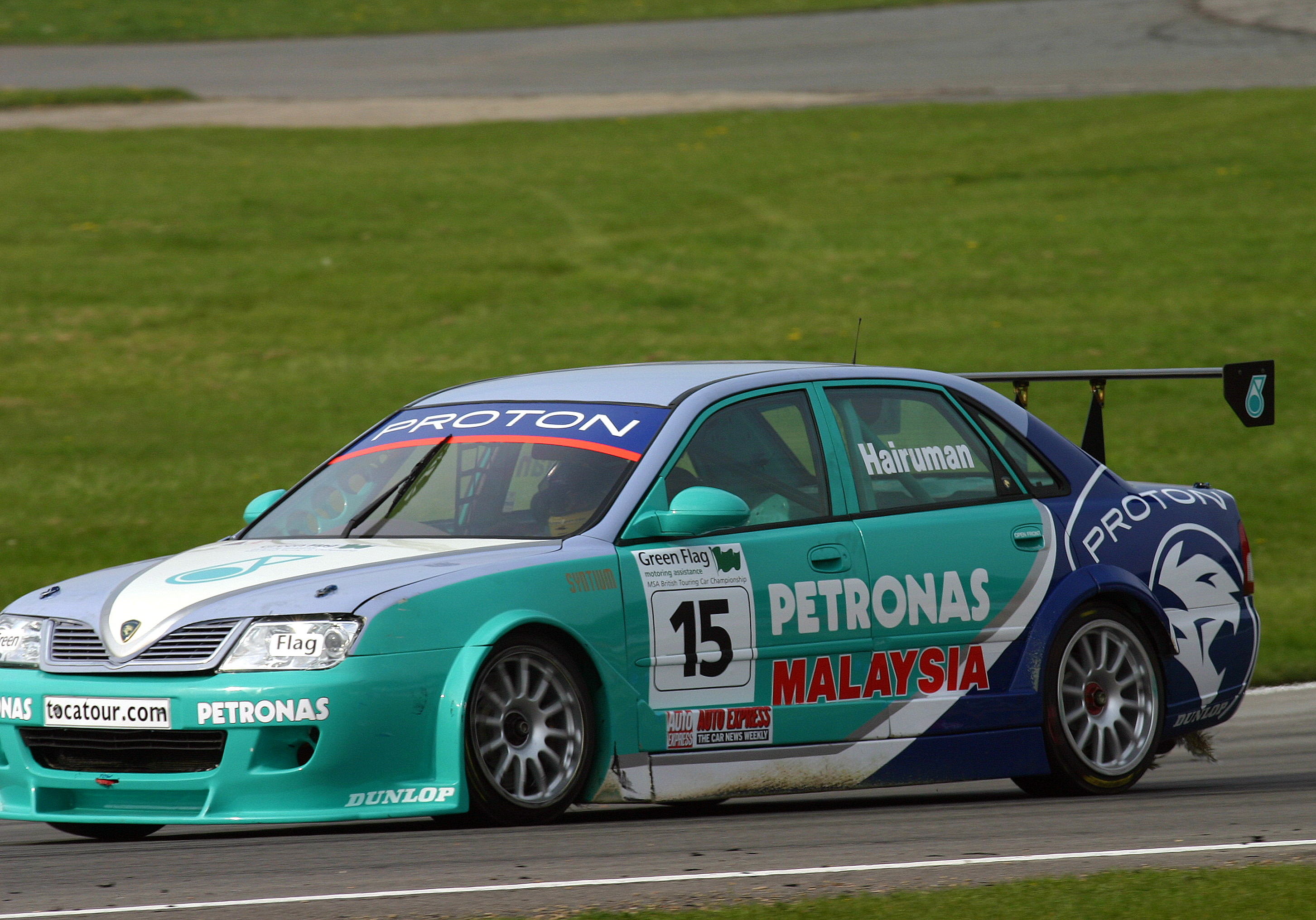
- Hairuman competing in the British Touring Car Championship in 2004
- Nationality: (Malaysia) Malaysian
- Born: 10 March 1983 (age 43) Johor Bahru, Johor, Malaysia

British Touring Car Championship career
- Debut season: 2004
- Car number: 15
- Former teams: Petronas Syntium Proton
- Starts: 30
- Wins: 0
- Poles: 0
- Fastest laps: 0

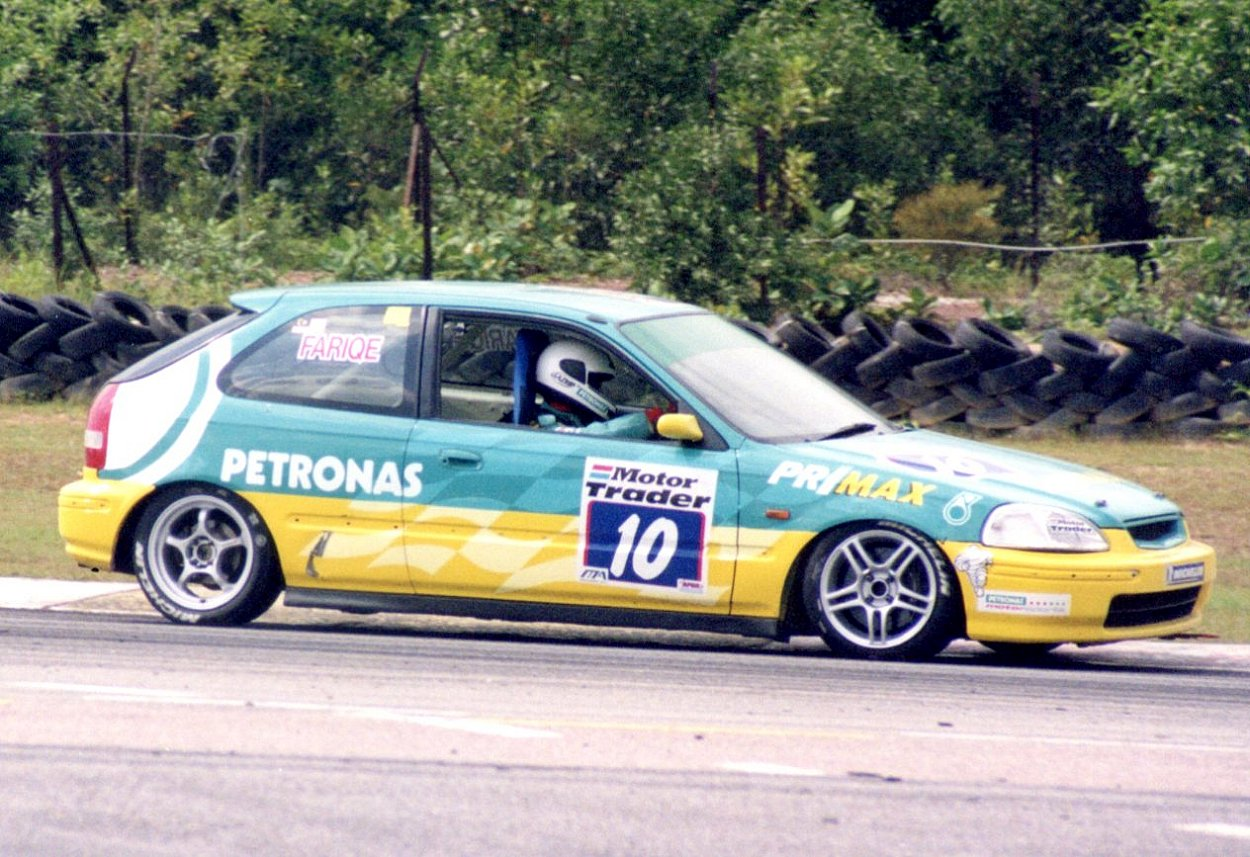
Hairuman driving the Petronas sponsored Honda Civic at Batu Tiga Raceway, Shah Alam, Malaysia in 2002.

Mohamad Fariqe bin Hairuman (born 10 March 1983) is a Malaysian racing driver.

== BTCC ==
Hairuman is possibly best known as a driver for Team Petronas Syntium Proton (Team PSP) in the British Touring Car Championship in 2004.

== ATCC ==
Hairuman is also known for having driven in the Asian Touring Car Championship (ATCC) (2006). He is the season's Champion for ATCC 2007 (Overall).

== Merdeka Millennium 12 Hour Endurance Race ==
Hairuman has also competed in the Merdeka Millennium 12 Hour Endurance Race (Open Class) in 2002, 2003 and 2006 on Malaysia's Sepang International Circuit. In 2006, he led team Petronas to victory in Class C (Production cars below 1600cc) Other team members were Syahrizal Jamaluddin and Fauzi Othman. In 2009, he came second in MME driving the BMW Z4M with his teammate Masataka Yanagida & Nobuteru Taniguchi. In 2010, he suffered DNF as his car suffer mechanical problems. In 2011, he was the first Malaysian to drive the Mercedes SLS GT3 in the world. As the result in MMER in 2011, he came third overall. He led for 10 hours of the race before he suffered a mechanical problem on the front wheel. In 2012, he finished second overall with the Mercedes SLS GT3.

== Super Taikyu ==
In 2007, Hairuman competed in the Super Taikiyu in Japan, driving his new car, the BMW Z4M with Japanese driver Masataka Yanagida. In 2008, he finished second in the championship. In 2009, he finished first in championship.

== Personal life ==
Hairuman is married and lives in Johor, Malaysia. His personal car is a Mitsuoka Zero One. Formerly, he drove an Alfa Romeo 145. He often participates in drives with ItaliaAuto Club Malaysia.

== Racing record ==
=== Complete British Touring Car Championship results ===
(key) (Races in bold indicate pole position - 1 point awarded in first race) (Races in italics indicate the fastest lap - 1 point awarded all races) (* signifies that driver lead race for at least one lap - 1 point awarded all races)

Year	Team	Car	1	2	3	4	5	6	7	8	9	10	11	12	13	14	15	16	17	18	19	20	21	22	23	24	25	26	27	28	29	30	DC	Pts
2004	Petronas Syntium Proton	Proton Impian	THR; 1 Ret	THR; 2 DNS	THR; 3 Ret	BRH; 1 Ret	BRH; 2; 13	BRH; 3; 14	SIL; 1; 15	SIL; 2; 17	SIL; 3; 15	OUL; 1; 14	OUL; 2; 17	OUL; 3; 13	MON; 1; 16	MON; 2 Ret	MON; 3; 11	CRO; 1; 16	CRO; 2 Ret	CRO; 3 Ret	KNO; 1 Ret	KNO; 2; 12	KNO; 3 Ret	BRH; 1; 17	BRH; 2; 14	BRH; 3 Ret	SNE; 1 Ret	SNE; 2; 15	SNE; 3 Ret	DON; 1 NC	DON; 2 Ret	DON; 3 DNS	**23rd**	**0**

=== TCR Spa 500 results ===
Year	Team	Co-Drivers	Car	Class	Laps	Pos.	Class Pos.
2019	(Malaysia) Viper Niza Racing	(Malaysia) Dominic Ang (Malaysia) Douglas Khoo (Malaysia) Melvin Moh	CUPRA León TCR	**PA**	441	4th	**1st**

2019:

- TCR Spa 500 1st in Pro-Am

- Sepang 1000 km Champion

- Malaysia Touring car Champion

Year	Details	Position	Team
2001	Intensive Training at Mansfield Circuit, New Zealand; Debut in the Johor Race Series; ATCC Round Shah Alam; ATCC Sepang; When to South Africa for training with Michele Briggs	5th 2nd 4th	Richard Lester Motorsport Team Petronas Primax
2002	Johor Race Series; ATCC Johor; ATCC Sepang; Merdeka Millenium 12 Hours	Champion overall 2nd 4th 5th overall	Team Petronas Primax
2003	New Zealand 8-Hours Endurance Race; New Zealand 4-Hours Endurance Race; New Zealand 6-Hours Endurance Race; Merdeka 12-Hours Endurance Race; Began Circuit acclimatisation programme, UK	1st DNF 1st	Team Petronas Primax
2004	Debut in BTCC; Merdeka 12-Hours Endurance Race	3rd	Petronas Syntium Team Team Petronas Primax

2018:

- Sepang 1000 km Champion

2017:

- Sepang 1000 km

2015:

· Malaysian Touring Car Champion

2014:

· Sepang 1000 km debut -Qualified 3rd -DNF

2013:

•Super Taikyu Endurance Series ~ 2nd · 1st race driver to win in newly open Inje Speedway (Korea)

2012:

•Malaysia Merdeka Endurance Series 2012 ~ 2nd Overall •Super Taikyu Endurance Series ~ Champion

2011:

•Malaysia Merdeka Endurance Series 2011 ~ 2nd Overall •Super Taikyu Endurance Series ~ 2nd

2010:

•Dunlop 24Hours Dubai ~ Class winner, 2nd overall •Super Taikyu Endurance Series ~ Champion

2009:

• Full season Super Taikyu Endurance Series ~ 2nd overall. • PETRONAS Primax 3 Merdeka Millenium Endurance Race ~ 2nd overall.

2008:

• Full season Super Taikyu Endurance Series Champion, winner 24-hours of Tokachi ~ 2nd overall Champion in class ST1

2007:

• Full season in the 2007 ATCS ~ Overall Champion Drivers’ championship; 2nd Overall Team Championship • Debuted in the Super Taikyu Endurance Series ~ 5th position overall; 3 Pole positions; 1 x second-place finish; 1 x third-place finish • PETRONAS Primax 3 Merdeka Millennium Endurance Race ~ Led for 11 hours, DNF (Class O) • Full season in the 2006 ATCC, 2nd Overall ATCC Drivers' Championship, 4 x second-place finishes, 5 x third places finishes, Overall Team Championship award •Class C winner in the 2006 PETRONAS Primax 3 Merdeka Millennium Endurance Race

2005:

• Full season in the 2005 ATCC ~ 2nd Overall ATCC Drivers Championship; Two Race wins; Eight 2nd Place finishes • Merdeka Millennium Endurance Race

2004:

• Debuted in the 2004 British Touring Car Championship • Merdeka Millennium Endurance Race ~ 3rd Overall in Class (Class C)

2003:

• New Zealand 8-hours Endurance Race, 1st place • New Zealand 4-hours Endurance Race – DNF • New Zealand 6-hours Endurance Race, 1st place • ATCC Round Sepang, 4th place • Merdeka Millennium 12-hour Endurance Race • Began Circuit acclimatisation programme, UK

2002:

• Johor Race Series, 1st place • ATCC Round Johor, 2nd-place finish • ATCC Round Sepang, 4th place • Merdeka Millennium 12-hour Endurance race

2001:

• Intensive Training at Mansfield Circuit, New Zealand • May - Debut in the Johor Race Series, 5th-place finish • ATCC Round Shah Alam, 2nd-place finish • ATCC Round Sepang, 4th-place finish

Sporting positions
Preceded by Franz Engstler	Asian Touring Car Championship Champion; 2007	Succeeded by Jack Lemvard
