= BTC Touring =

Specification of racing car formerly used in the British Touring Car Championship

Motor racing formula
- Category: Touring cars
- Country or region: United Kingdom
- Championships: BTCC
- Inaugural season: 2001
- Status: Defunct
- Folded: 2011

In motor racing, BTC Touring (BTC-T) was a set of new regulations for the British Touring Car Championship (BTCC) introduced in the 2001 BTCC, after the demise of the Supertouring category.

The cars were based on standard bodyshells but were allowed significant modifications to turn them into race cars and differentiate them from the Super Production class that would run alongside BTC Touring in the 2001 BTCC.

== Models ==
Manufacturer	Model	Image	Debut
Alfa Romeo	147		2001
Honda	Civic Type-R		2002
Honda	Integra Type R		2005
Lexus	IS200		2001
MG Cars	ZS EX259		2001
Peugeot	307		2003
Peugeot	406 Coupe		2001
Proton	Impian		2002
Vauxhall	Astra Coupe		2001
Vauxhall	Astra Sport Hatch		2005
Vauxhall	Vectra		2004

== Gallery ==
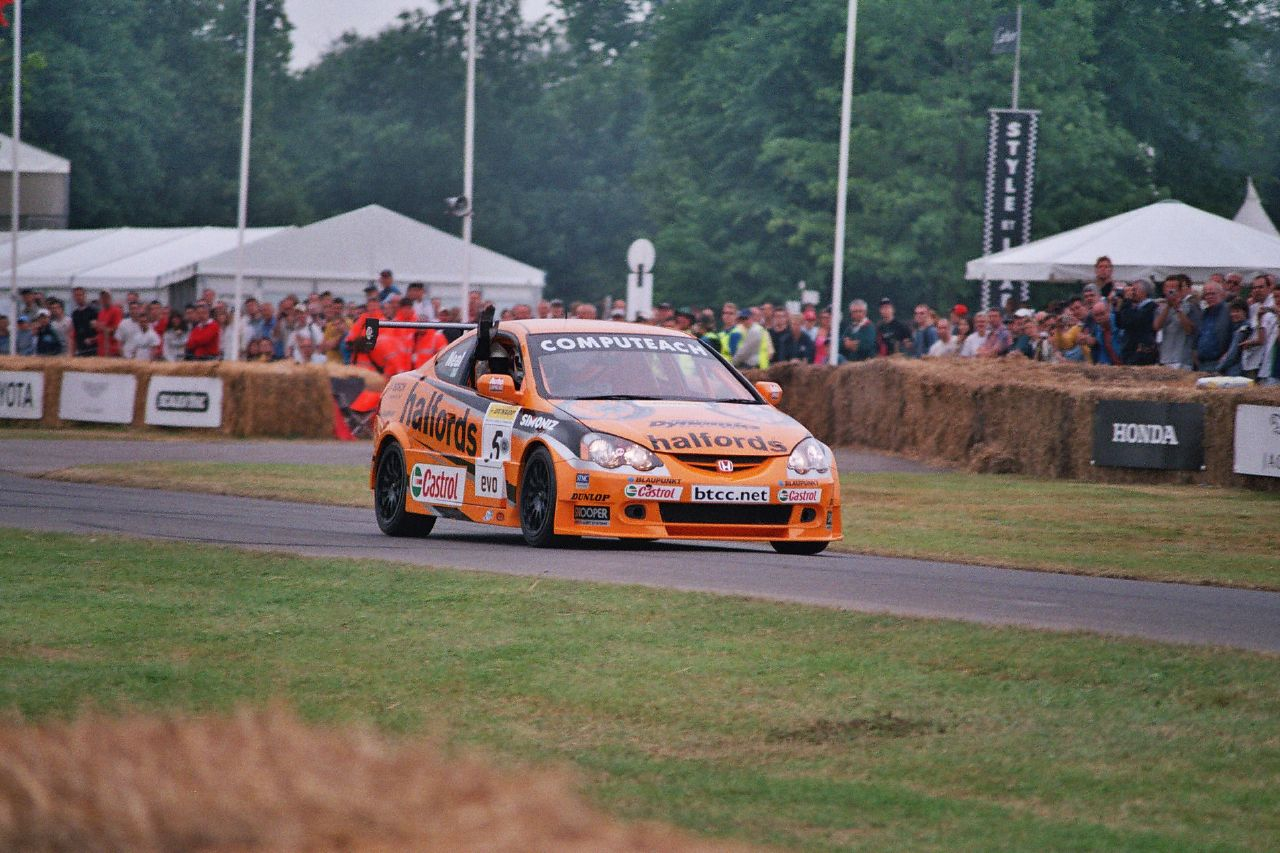
Matt Neal demonstrates a Team Dynamics BTC-T Honda Integra Type R at the 2005 Goodwood Festival of Speed.

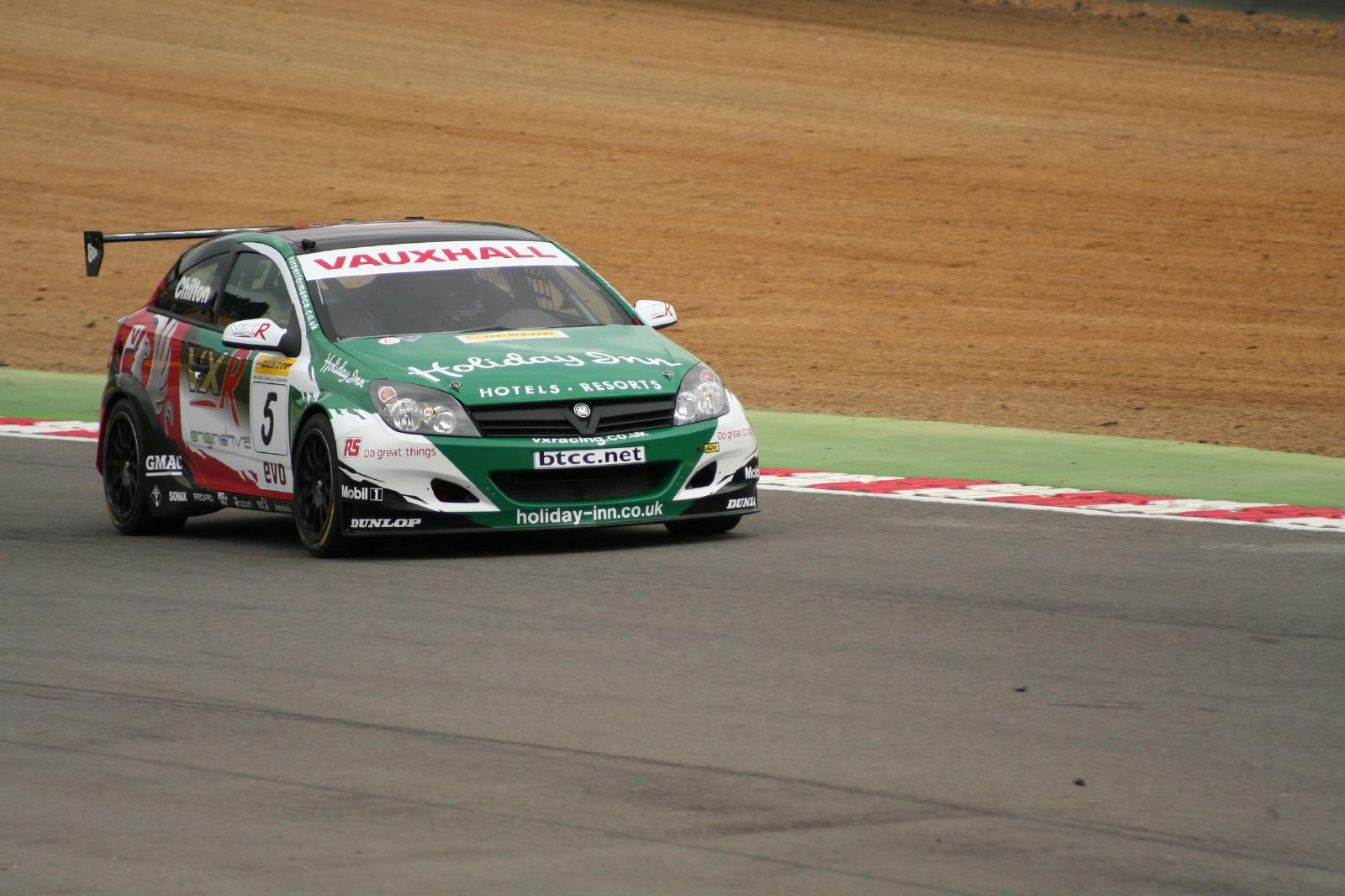
Tom Chilton driving a VXRacing prepared BTC-T Vauxhall Astra Sport Hatch at Brands Hatch.

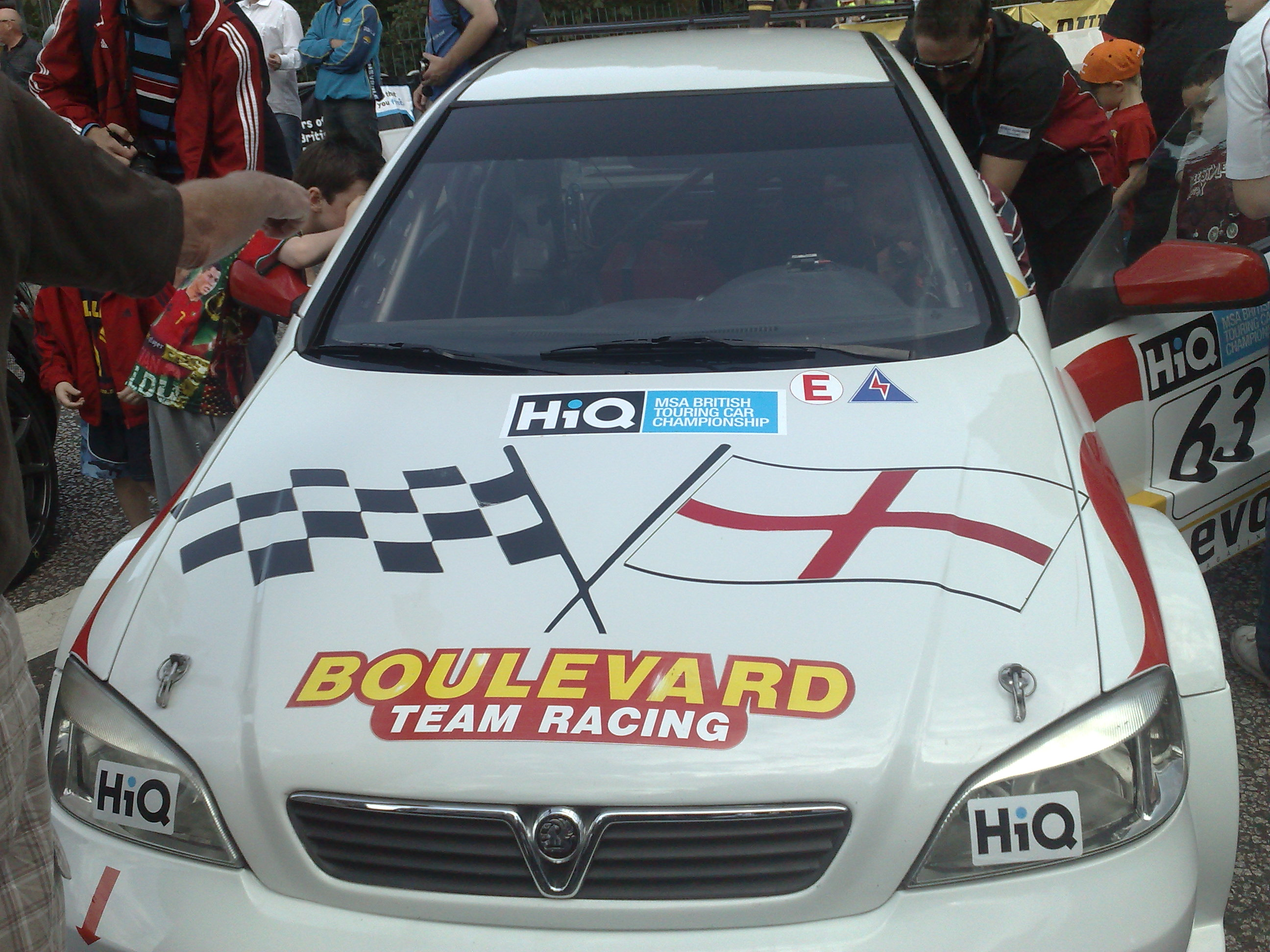
Martin Johnson's BTC-T Vauxhall Astra Coupe as seen during 2009 season.

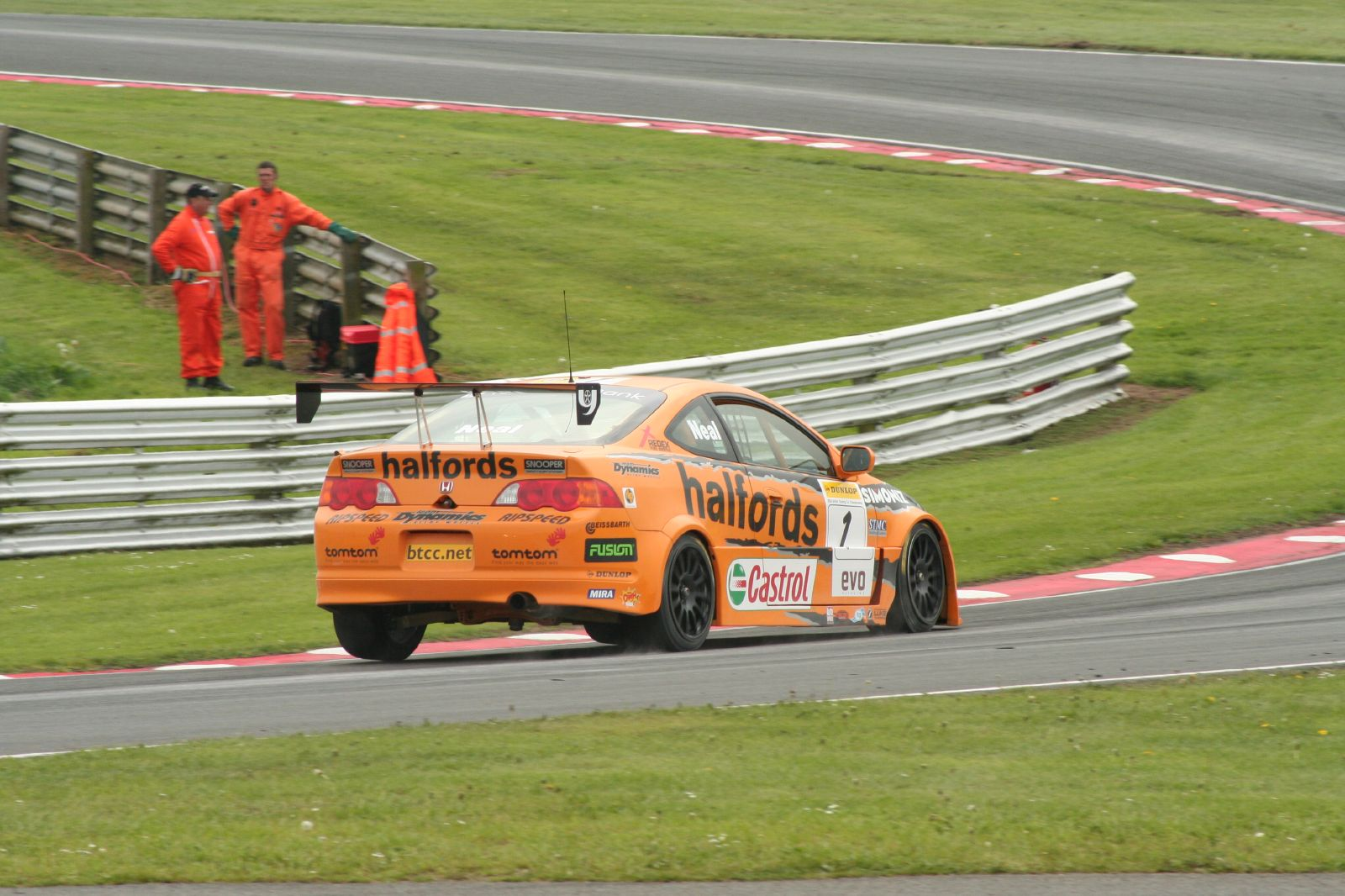
Matt Neal's BTC-T Honda Integra Type R which won him the 2005 and 2006 Drivers Championships.

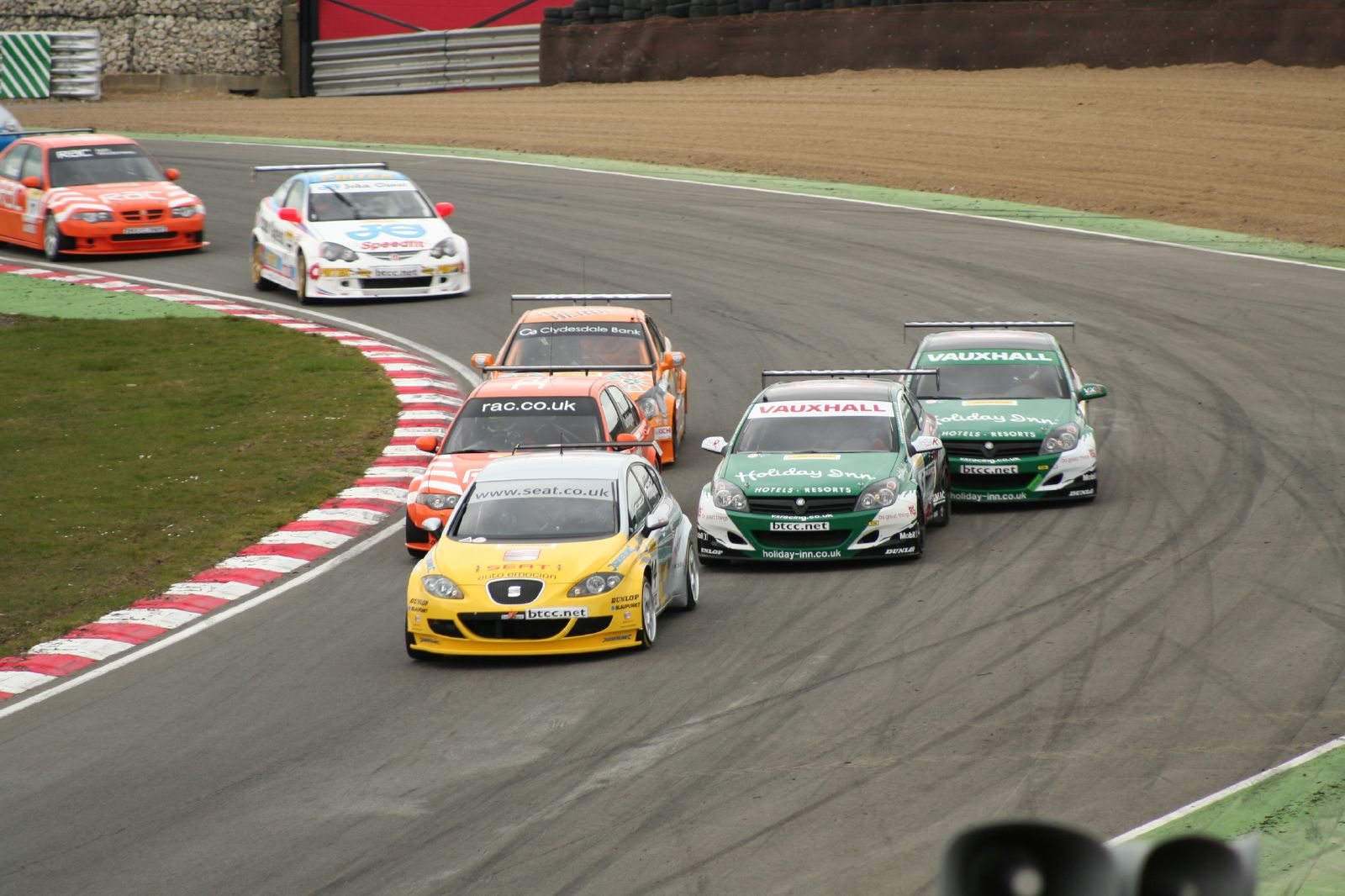
Several BTC-T Spec. Cars (with S2000 cars) at Brands Hatch in 2006. (BTC-T Spec. cars are 2x Astra, 2x Integra and 1x MG ZS).

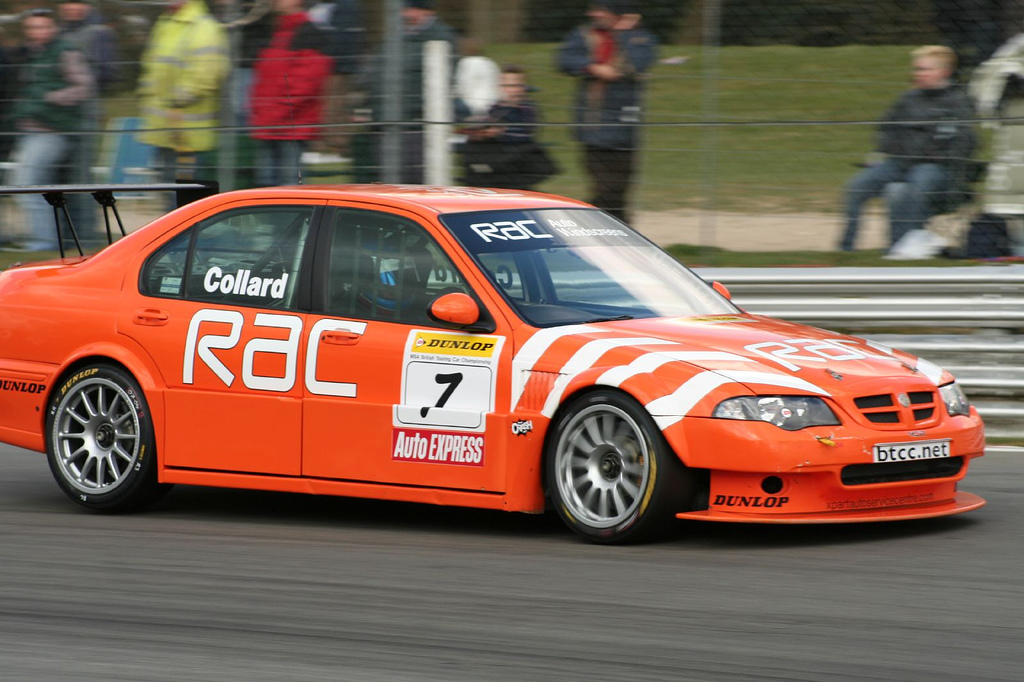
Rob Collard in a Team RAC BTC-T MG ZS.

== History ==
A year after the regulations began, the European Touring Car Championship launched its Super 2000 regulations. As the latter allowed manufacturers to have their cars seen internationally, most major companies opted for it, resulting in small grids for the BTCC. In 2004, TOCA allowed Super 2000 cars to compete, with rules designed to equalise the performance of both classes. BTC-T cars were eventually made ineligible to win the main championship from 2007.

The 2010 season was meant to be the last year BTC Touring cars were eligible to enter the championship; however, they were allowed to compete for one more season in 2011, with their base-weight +50 kg on 2010.
