= BTC-T Proton Impian =

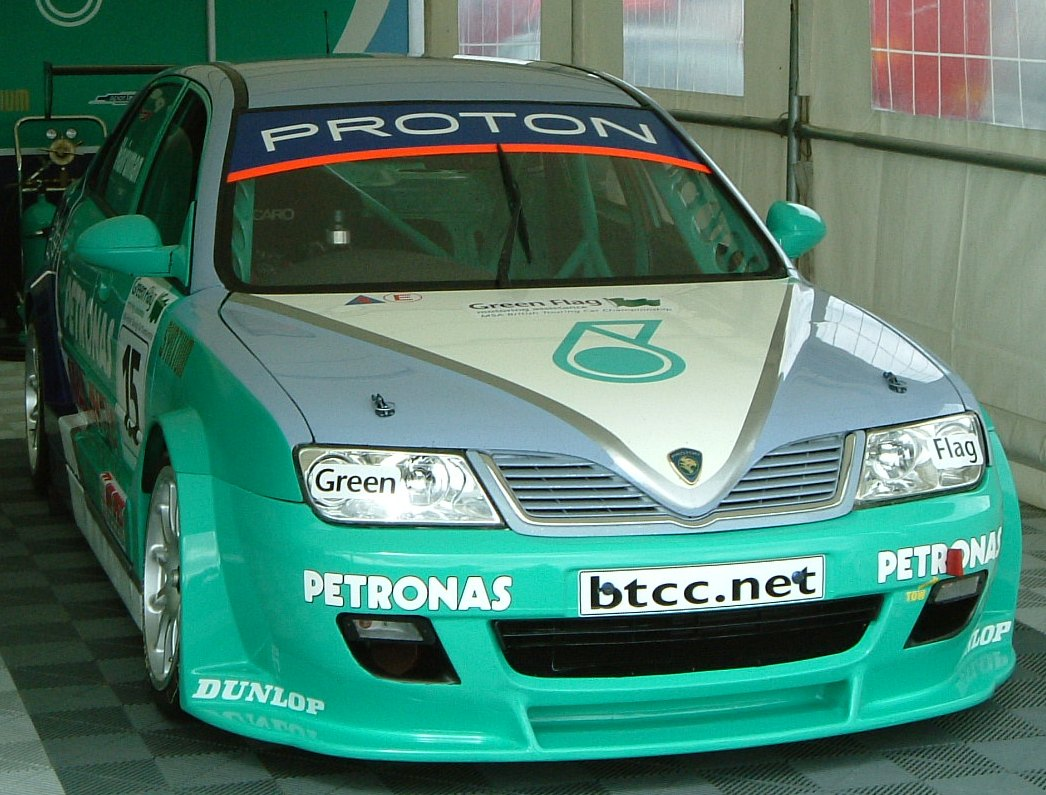
- Category: BTCC; ATCC
- Constructor: Team PSP

Technical specifications
- Chassis: Proton Waja
- Length: 4,473 mm (176.1 in)
- Width: 1,821 mm (71.7 in)
- Height: 1,356.5 mm (53.4 in)
- Axle track: 1,576 mm (62.0 in)
- Wheelbase: 2,600 mm (102.4 in)
- Engine: Mountune Racing-built Proton 1,996 cc (121.8 cu in) In-line 4 NA front-mounted, FWD
- Transmission: Xtrac 6-speed Sequential
- Weight: 1,050 kg (2,314.9 lb) (with driver)

Competition history
- Notable entrants: Team PSP
- Debut: 2002 BTCC at Brands Hatch GP Circuit
Races	Wins	Poles	F/Laps
95	2	?	?
- Teams' Championships: 0
- Constructors' Championships: 0
- Drivers' Championships: 0

The BTC-T Proton Impian is a BTC-Touring class racing car that was built for the 2002 British Touring Car Championship season by Team PSP, who ran Proton's official works program.

== BTCC ==
In 2001, the Malaysian carmaker, Proton, announced that they would be entering into the British Touring Car Championship for the first time the following year with its Proton Impian, with the effort being run by Team Petronas Syntium Proton. Based in Norfolk, the team were forced to purchase the cars from local dealerships, due to the difficulties of importing bodyshells from Malaysia. This hindered the development of the car, as it was not purpose-built from the ground up as a race car. Mountune Racing provided the engines, which were praised by the car's drivers during testing. David Leslie was able to achieve several podium finishes in 2002, finishing 7th overall, whilst teammate Phil Bennett struggled to maintain the form he showed in 2001 at the egg:sport Vauxhall team, and could only achieve a lowly 16th, with only the independently entered Peugeot of Carl Breeze finishing behind him.

Both drivers were retained for 2003, but the fully revamped car proved uncompetitive, and it finished no higher than a 5th place in the hands of Leslie, gained in the first race of the season at Mondello Park, gained mostly due to the attrition of the Touring-class cars. Leslie slipped to 11th in the championship, whilst Bennett once more finished in 16th, as Proton remained 4th in the Manufacturer's standings.

A new-look driver lineup was announced for 2004: South African driver Shaun Watson-Smith and Malaysian Fariqe Hairuman replaced Leslie and Bennett. 2004 would prove even less successful - Watson-Smith achieved a fine 14th in his debut season, but Hairuman could do no better than 23rd in the championship, with Proton once again finishing 4th, and last, in the Manufacturer's championship - on 325 points behind the 3rd-placed Seat Sport UK, who were competing in their first season with the Super 2000-spec Seat Toledo.

== Later career ==
At the end of the 3-year deal, Proton withdrew from the BTCC, instead opting to run Hairuman, Mashlino Buang and Michael Briggs in the Asian Touring Car Championship, with the cars rebadged as the Proton Waja. In a sparse field mixed with Super 2000 and Super Production machinery, the Waja proved competitive, with Hairuman managing to finish second in both 2005 and 2006. In 2007, Team PSP retired the cars, and instead opted to use the Super 2000-spec BMW 320si.

== Chassis History ==
Car 1

- 2002 - David Leslie
- 2003 - Phil Bennett
- 2004 - Fariqe Hairuman
- 2005 - Mashlino Buang (Asian Touring Car Championship)
- 2006 - Mashlino Buang (Asian Touring Car Championship)

Car 2

- 2002 - Phil Bennett
- 2003/04/05 - Unused
- 2006 - Michael Briggs (Asian Touring Car Championship)

Car 3

- 2003 - David Leslie
- 2004 - Shaun Watson-Smith
- 2005 - Fariqe Hairuman (Asian Touring Car Championship)
- 2006 - Fariqe Hairuman (Asian Touring Car Championship)
