= BTC-T Lexus IS200 =

Racing car

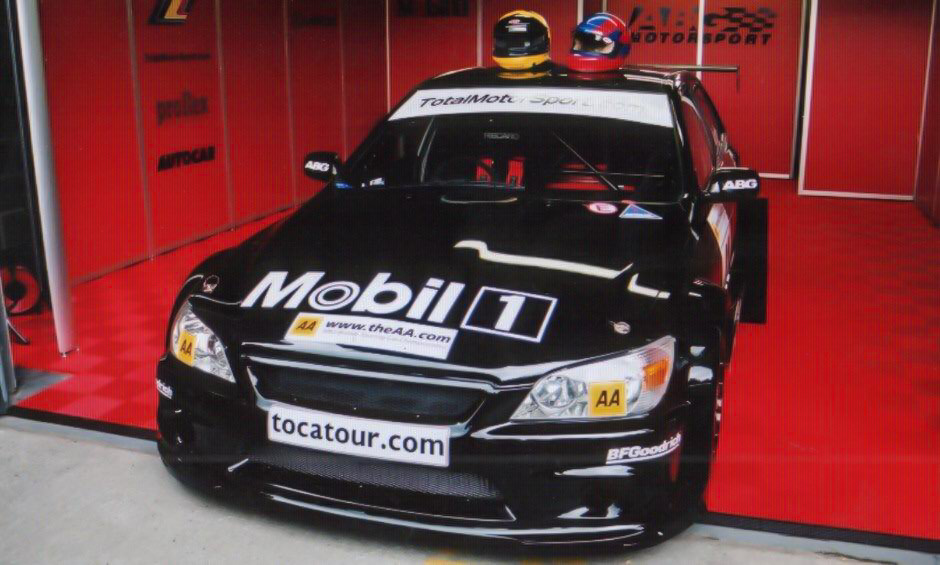
- The Lexus IS200 run by ABG Motorsport, in the garage at Brands Hatch, 16 or 17 April 2001.
- Category: BTCC
- Constructor: ABG Motorsport

Technical specifications
- Chassis: Lexus IS200
- Engine: 1,998 cc (121.9 cu in) 286 hp (213 kW; 290 PS) in-line 4 NA front-mounted, RWD
- Transmission: Xtrac 6-speed Sequential
- Weight: 1,128 kg (2,486.8 lb)

Competition history
- Notable entrants: ABG Motorsport
- Debut: 2001 BTCC at Thruxton
Races	Wins	Poles	F/Laps
24	0	0	0
- Teams' Championships: 0
- Constructors' Championships: 0
- Drivers' Championships: 0

With the new low-cost BTC Touring rules encouraging private teams to build their own cars, Cheshire-based ABG Motorsport decided to construct a Lexus IS200 for 2001.

Converted from a roadcar into a racing machine, the car missed the first meeting at Brands Hatch, but appeared at Thruxton for the second event of the season and made an instant impression with its all-black paintjob. Initially driven by Kurt Luby, he stepped down after round 12, and was replaced by Brazilian Thomas Erdos, originally contracted to drive a second IS200, but construction of a second chassis was never undertaken. The Lexus was a reasonably competitive machine, taking several top six finishes behind the works Vauxhalls, usually competing with the works Peugeot 406 Coupes. Autocar magazine journalist Steve Sutcliffe drove in the final two rounds at Brands Hatch, but struggled in the wet conditions, finishing 9th in the sprint race.

The sole chassis was withdrawn at the end of 2001 as ABG Motorsport withdrew from the BTCC, although Super 2000-specification IS200s did appear in 2005 and 2006.

== Chassis History ==
Car 1

- 2001 - Kurt Luby (Rounds 3-12)/Thomas Erdos (Rounds 13-24)/Steve Sutcliffe (Rounds 25 and 26)
