= BTC-T Vauxhall Astra Coupe =

BTC-Touring class racing car model

BTCC Vauxhall Astra Coupé
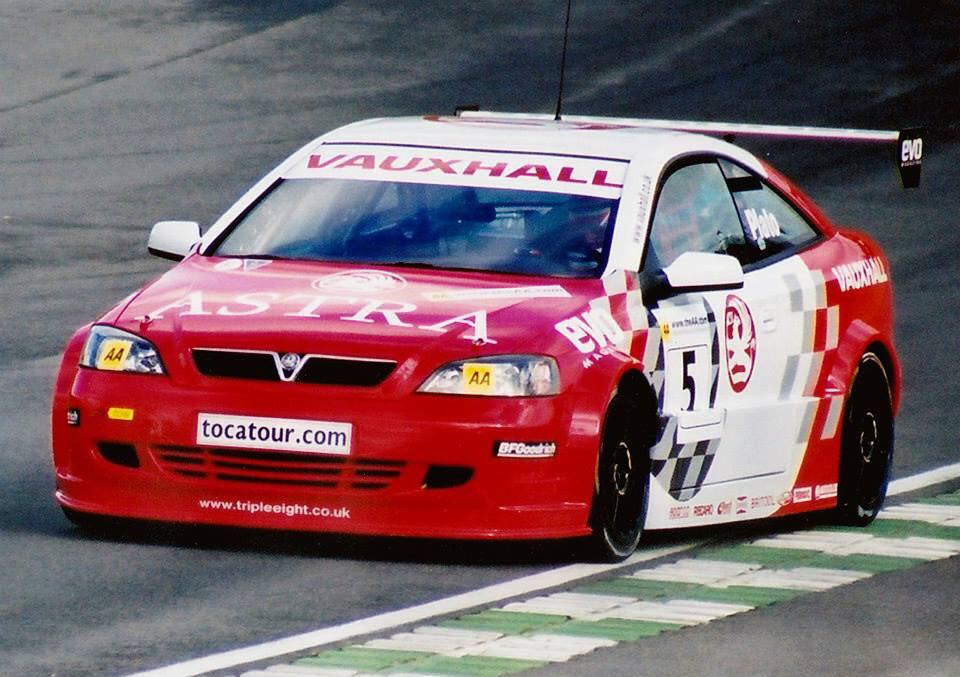
- Category: BTCC
- Constructor: Triple 8 Race Engineering

Technical specifications
- Chassis: Vauxhall Astra Mk IV
- Length: 4,267 mm (168.0 in)
- Width: 1,709 mm (67.3 in)
- Height: 1,390 mm (54.7 in)
- Axle track: 1,652 mm (65.0 in)
- Wheelbase: 2,613 mm (102.9 in)
- Engine: 2,000 cc (122.0 cu in) 275 hp (205 kW; 279 PS) In-line 4 NA front-mounted, FWD
- Transmission: 6-speed Sequential
- Weight: 1,150 kg (2,535.3 lb)

Competition history
- Notable entrants: Vauxhall Motorsports egg:sport Barwell Motorsport; GA Motorsports; Collard Racing; Team Dynamics; Tech-Speed Motorsport; Fast-Tec Motorsport; Daniels Motorsport; Boulevard Team Racing
- Debut: 2001 BTCC at Brands Hatch Indy Circuit
- Teams' Championships: 4 (2001, 2002, 2003, 2004)
- Constructors' Championships: 4 (2001, 2002, 2003, 2004)
- Drivers' Championships: 4 (2001, 2002, 2003, 2004)

The Vauxhall Astra Coupe is a BTC-Touring class racing car that was built for the 2001 British Touring Car Championship season by Triple 8 Race Engineering, who ran Vauxhall's official works program. It was the first BTC Touring-specification car to be unveiled in late 2000. Triple 8 had worked on the Astra in the summer of that year and as a result, with 4 cars - 2 with Vauxhall sponsorship (driven by Jason Plato and Yvan Muller) and 2 with Egg Banking sponsorship (driven by James Thompson, Phil Bennett, and a one-off appearance by Andy Priaulx) had given themselves a head start on the rest of the field at the start of the 2001 season. In the end, it was far more advanced in its development than anything else in the field, allowing to win 25 out of 26 races in 2001 (although the only non-Vauxhall win was a non-points scoring victory by Anthony Reid for MG, so they picked up maximum constructors points in every race). A 3-way battle for the championship lasted throughout the season, with Jason Plato emerging victorious by 18 points. In fact, so dominant were the cars that the lowest placed Astra driver, Phil Bennett, who finished 4th in the Driver's Championship, was 58 points clear of the next driver.

In 2002, the Astra Coupes proved less reliable, with multiple problems and failures for all 4 works drivers throughout the season. Triple Eight once again entered 2 Vauxhall-sponsored and 2 Egg-sponsored Astra's - with James Thompson replacing the departing Plato in the Vauxhall Motorsport car, and Matt Neal and Paul O'Neill replacing him and Bennett in the egg:sport cars. Despite the multitude of technical issues, a full time MG campaign, the return of Honda, and the arrival of Proton, Vauxhall won a clean sweep of the titles again, with all of the top 3 positions in the Driver's Championship filled by drivers of the cars - Thompson this time finishing the victor, by 20 points. Aaron Slight also came second in the Independent's Cup in his first and only full BTCC season. The car's dominance in 2001 meant that the Astras were limited to only 70% throttle during qualifying for 2002; with the exception of Matt Neal's car, which was limited to 67% throttle due to the large size of his feet.

2003 saw Triple Eight lose the Egg sponsorship, and instead expanded to a 3 car Vauxhall-run team. Matt Neal departed for Honda Racing, but O'Neill was retained, and thus moved to join Thompson and Muller in the Vauxhall Motorsports cars - which were now rebranded under the name of VX Racing. The team again won the drivers, manufacturers and teams award and even added the Independents Cup with Rob Collard. This time, the top 2 positions in the Driver's Championship went to Astra drivers - Muller taking the championship by 34 points.

2004 would be the last season the Astra Coupes were used by the works Vauxhall team. Thompson and Muller would this time be partnered by Luke Hines, who replaced O'Neill. Despite the arrival of SEAT with former champion Jason Plato, and strengthened Honda and MG efforts, they were unable to break the dominance of the Vauxhall, which again won the drivers, manufacturers and teams championships. Once more, James Thompson was the champion, this time edging a close title fight by just 1 point ahead of Muller. In fact, despite the strengthened works teams that had come into the BTCC since 2001, the gap still remained huge - Muller finished the season 49 points ahead of the nearest challenger.

== Later career ==
In 2005, the works Vauxhall team switched to the Astra Sport Hatch, but the Astra Coupes were still used sporadically by several independent drivers; it had little success, being outpaced by the more consistently utilised cars before disappearing from the championship altogether at the end of 2006. After two years without an entry, the car returned to the series in 2009, in the hands of Martin Johnson, who scored 2 points in his first season. The 2010 saw the last entry of the Astra Coupe, again in Johnson's hands, and it achieved a 9th place in its final season at Rockingham. The car still saw action in 2011 in the UAE.
