= John Batchelor (racing) =

British racing driver and businessman (1959–2010)

- Nationality: (United Kingdom) British
- Born: 4 January 1959 Sheffield, South Yorkshire, England
- Died: 11 April 2010 (aged 51) Stockport, Greater Manchester, England

British Touring Car Championship
- Years active: 2001–2002
- Teams: Team B&Q
- Starts: 17
- Wins: 0
- Poles: 0
- Fastest laps: 0
- Best finish: 22nd (Production Class) in 2001

William John Batchelor (4 January 1959 – 11 April 2010), was an English racing driver, businessman, political activist, and football investor. He was chairman of York City F.C. from 2002 to 2003, during which time he was also the owner of York City Racing, a motor racing team competing in the British Touring Car Championship.

== Early life ==
Batchelor was born in Sheffield, South Yorkshire, where he lived for a short period before moving to Surrey, Kent and Portugal due to his father's work. He was the grandson of the Batchelor's Dried Foods founder William Bachelor. He received four O-Levels at school and had an exchange year in Oregon, United States, after which he sold insurance door-to-door in East Lancashire. He worked in this for nine months before selling cleaning products for five years, when he started "System Hygiene", a janitorial supplies company based in Accrington. He married Gillian in 1981 and the couple have had four children. "System Hygiene" was sold by Batchelor to business partner Robin Huddleston in 1990. He stood as a Common Sense Sick of Politicians candidate for Blackburn in the 1997 general election, coming in last place after winning 0.8% of the share with 362 votes. Following the election, through an open letter, he said "I extend my gratitude to the 362 voters in Blackburn who backed my campaign to take politics out of government. I would also like to point out that an additional 30,000 voters also offered me their support by being so sick of politicians that they abstained from voting at all. If we now add this figure to my votes and then subtract the votes of the 'winning' candidate it shows a 5,000-vote majority for those who are sick of politicians."

== Racing career ==
Batchelor became a racing driver in 1999 after being backed by Blackburn Rovers and their sponsors, which helped him gain enough money to build a 220bhp Ford Fiesta and entered the Super Road Saloons Championship. He won the title in his first season and moved into the Ford Fiesta Zetec Championship the year after and secured a sponsorship deal with BBC programme Top Gear, which saw him change his name to John Top-Gear through deed poll. He entered the British Touring Car Championship in 2001 and after asking over 800 companies for financial support he persuaded B&Q, the DIY megastore, to join him before the start of the season and also changed his name to John B&Q to help him gain funding. His best result was eighth in class and 13th overall at Donington Park in 2001. He stood as an independent candidate for Tatton in the 2001 general election, which saw him win 0.8% of the vote with 322 votes. He injured his third, fourth, and fifth vertical vertebrae [sic] in a race at Oulton Park in Cheshire, which almost forced him to retire. Batchelor secured a £1 million deal for his racing team to be sponsored by battery company VARTA in 2003.

Batchelor was involved in the planned entry of Chinese automobile manufacturer Brilliance into the newly formed FIA World Touring Car Championship in 2005. However, the Brilliance WTCC program did not make the grid.

Batchelor also registered an entry for the 2005 British Touring Car Championship, driving a Super 2000 Honda Civic Type-R under the Team Firstserve Group banner, but this also failed to materialise.

== Racing record ==
=== Complete British Touring Car Championship results ===
(key) Races in bold indicate pole position in class (1 point awarded all races) Races in italics indicate fastest lap in class (1 point awarded all races) * signifies that driver lead race for at least one lap in class (1 point awarded just in feature race)

Year	Team	Car	Class	1	2	3	4	5	6	7	8	9	10	11	12	13	14	15	16	17	18	19	20	21	22	23	24	25	26	DC	Pts	Class
2001	Team B&Q / Talksport Radio	Honda Integra Type-R	P	BRH; 1; 15†	BRH; 2 ovr:20 cls:14	THR; 1 ovr:14 cls:9	THR; 2 ovr:14 cls:9	OUL; 1 ovr:23 cls:14	OUL; 2 ovr:14 cls:10	SIL; 1 ovr:22 cls:14	SIL; 2 ovr:21 cls:14	MON; 1	MON; 2	DON; 1 Ret	DON; 2 ovr:13 cls:8	KNO; 1	KNO; 2	SNE; 1	SNE; 2	CRO; 1	CRO; 2	OUL; 1 Ret	OUL; 2 ovr:17 cls:11	SIL; 1 DNS	SIL; 2 DNS	DON; 1 Ret	DON; 2 Ret	BRH; 1 Ret	BRH; 2 Ret	N/A	8	22nd
2002	Team B&Q Jet York City	Honda Accord	P	BRH; 1 DNS	BRH; 2 DNS	OUL; 1 Ret	OUL; 2 DNS	THR; 1	THR; 2	SIL; 1	SIL; 2	MON; 1	MON; 2	CRO; 1	CRO; 2	SNE; 1	SNE; 2	KNO; 1	KNO; 2	BRH; 1	BRH; 2	DON; 1	DON; 2							N/A	0	NC

† Event with 2 races staged for the different classes.

== Football ==
Batchelor-era York City badge.

Batchelor became the owner and chairman of York City on 15 March 2002 after buying the club from Douglas Craig; he was reported to have paid £4.5 million for the club, although it was later revealed he bought it for £1. After taking over the club, he said he had two sites in mind for a new 15,000-seated ground. He revealed an interest in buying ITV Digital in May, which he later admitted was unlikely to succeed. He changed the club's name from York City Football Club to York City Soccer Club, in an attempt to appeal to United States markets. Also, Batchelor's racing brand was incorporated into other parts of the club; the official badge had a chequered flag brought into it, as did the first team kit, which had a racing style print on one sleeve. He promised to buy York's Bootham Crescent ground, give the Supporters Trust 24% of the club's shares and invite two supporters onto the board, but none of these were fulfilled. It was reported that Batchelor received some death threats in regards to way he was handling the club. York went into administration on 18 December and he tried to purchase the club, but the Supporters Trust eventually bought the club on 26 March 2003. Following his time at York, Batchelor said "I did nothing wrong" and "I tried hard to make it work as a business". He was later investigated by the Department of Trade and Industry after pressure from supporters. Batchelor made a profit of over £300,000 from his association with York and while the club was enduring financial difficulties he bought a house for £250,000. He later admitted: "When I walked through Douglas Craig's door, I really was a toilet-roll salesman with nothing more than a load of debt."

Batchelor spent a month in hospital in late 2006 for alcoholism. He was a part of James Derry's bid to buy Mansfield Town in March 2008, but eventually launched his own bid to buy the club. He revealed plans to rename the club "Harchester United", after the fictional team in the Sky series Dream Team. This was called "absolutely bizarre" by Mansfield mayor Tony Egginton, who was later appointed as the club's non-executive chairman, which put doubt on Batchelor's takeover bid. He was later revealed to have had a £1.5 million bid for Accrington Stanley turned down by chairman Eric Whalley, which proposed moving a newly formed "Lancashire United" to Leigh and building a 10,000 seater stadium. He held talks with Chester City chairman Stephen Vaughan about purchasing the club in November. Batchelor fronted a consortium that made a £12.5 million bid to buy Southampton in July 2009. He was disqualified from acting as a company director for seven years from 2010 after he allowed two of his companies, Moornate Chemists Limited and The Besglos Polish Company Limited, to enter transactions to the benefit of connected companies and himself and to the detriment of their creditors.

Batchelor was a Burnley supporter and a season ticket holder at Turf Moor.

== Death ==
Batchelor spent time at a rehabilitation facility in the final years of his life. He died on 11 April 2010 in Stepping Hill Hospital, Stockport, Greater Manchester at the age of 51 after suffering from liver disease caused by alcoholism.
