= Mondello Park =

Motorsport venue in County Kildare, Ireland

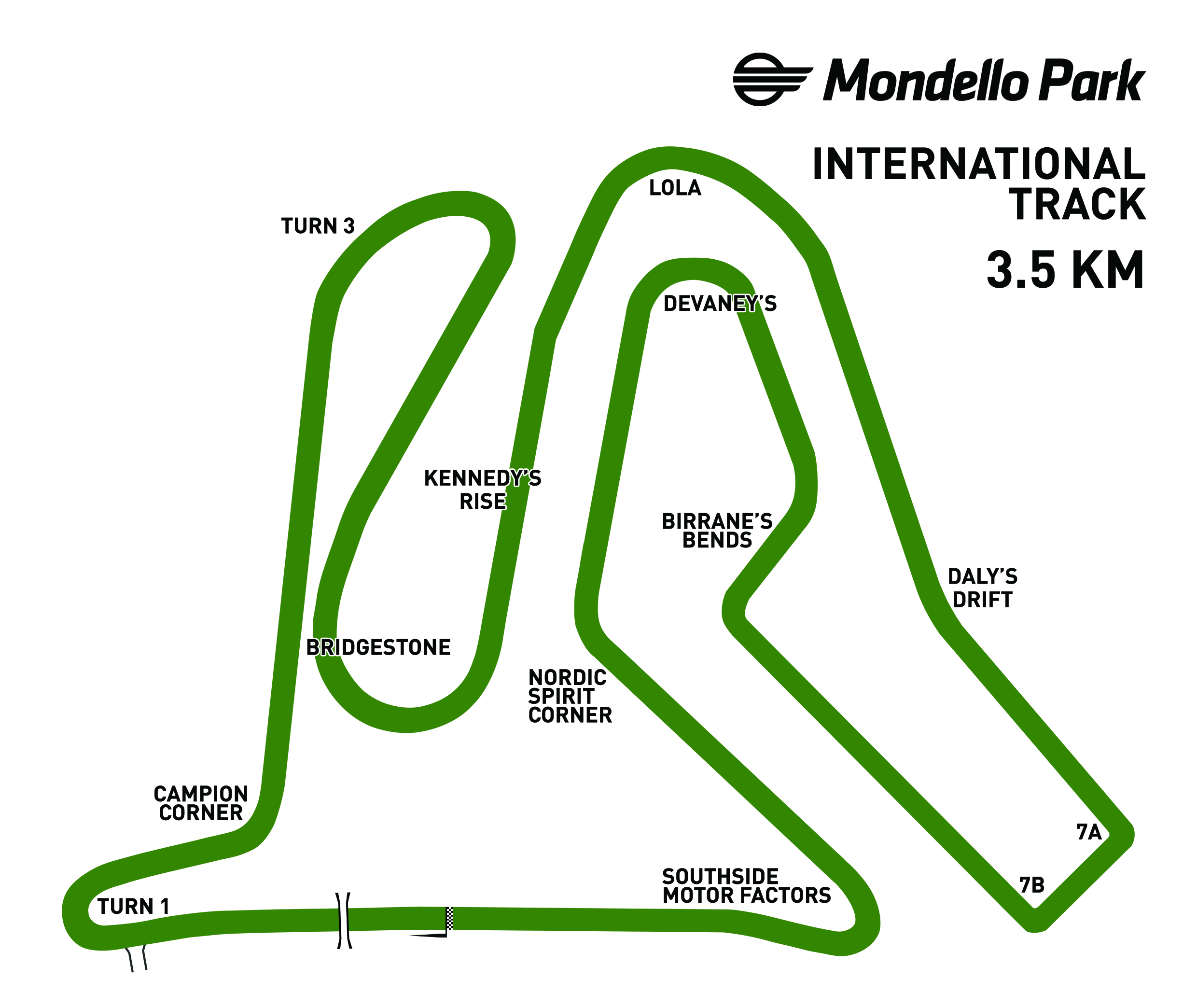
- 2024 International Track map.jpg International Circuit (1998–present)
- Location: Caragh, County Kildare, Ireland
- Coordinates: 53°15′27″N 006°44′42″W
- FIA Grade: 4
- Owner: Birrane family
- Opened: 1968
- Major events: Current: FIA European Rallycross Championship; Euro RX of Ireland (1987–1996, 2026); Drift Masters (2018–2019, 2022–present); Former: BSB (2003–2007); BTCC (2001–2006); British GT (2004–2006); EuroBOSS Series (1996–1999, 2001–2002, 2006); FIA Sportscar Championship (2001); Formula Palmer Audi (1999, 2001)

International Circuit (1998–present)
- Length: 3.621 km (2.250 mi)
- Turns: 13
- Race lap record: 1:28:708 ( (Denmark) Johnny Laursen, Benetton B197, 2006, F1)

Intermediate Circuit (1998–present)
- Length: 2.816 km (1.750 mi)
- Turns: 13

National Circuit (1969–present)
- Length: 1.860 km (1.156 mi)
- Turns: 6
- Race lap record: 0:47:380 ( (Republic of Ireland) Sylvie Mullins, Gould GR55B, 2023, BOSS Ireland)

Short Circuit (1968–present)
- Length: 1.250 km (0.777 mi)
- Turns: 6

Mondello Park is Ireland's only international motorsport venue that is located in Caragh, County Kildare off the R409 regional road, approximately 48 kilometres (30 mi) from Dublin city centre.

== History ==
The Mondello Park short circuit was designed on farmland near Naas in County Kildare by Stuart Cosgrave in 1966, following the demise of the Dunboyne motor races on traditional and dangerous roads in County Meath. The circuit opened in 1968, and was extended via the National Loop the following year. Irish drivers such as Derek Daly, David Kennedy, Tommy Byrne and Eddie Jordan cut their teeth on the circuit in the 1970s and early 1980s, but financial difficulties emerged thereafter.

Mondello was purchased by businessman Martin Birrane with the Royal Irish Automobile Club in 1986, and Birrane bought the facility outright one year later once the scale of investment became clear. The circuit was extended to 3.621 km (2.250 mi) with the opening of the International Circuit in 1998. Subsequent upgrades included FIA certification and pit garages with hospitality and conferencing facilities above.

Notable Leinster Trophy winners at Mondello include thrice F1 world champion Ayrton Senna (then known as Ayrton da Silva) in 1982, F1 race drivers John Watson, Mika Hakkinen and Takuma Sato; and Jordan Grand Prix founder Eddie Jordan during his driving career.

The 2000s marked the most high profile time for the Irish circuit, as domestic series from Great Britain came over to Mondello Park every year. These included the British Touring Car Championship which ran from 2001 to 2006, the British GT Championship from 2004 to 2006 and the British Superbike Championship which ran from 2003 to 2007 where Jonathan Rea took his first ever BSB win in the last ever race at the circuit. Mondello Park also hosted a round of the FIA Sportscar Championship in 2001.

Mondello Park is now owned by Birrane's family following his death in 2018.

== Events ==
Currently, Irish Car Championship, Rallycross, kart and Principal Insurance Masters Superbike Championship racing events take place. In the past Mondello Park hosted the Irish round of the British Superbike Championship, British Touring Car Championship, British GT Championship and the British Formula Three Championship.

Other recurring motorsport events include drifting championship, Jap-Fest, Ireland's only Japanese car show, Historic Festival, historic car show and racing event. Mondello Park Racing School is on-site. General public car and motorbike circuit track days are organised.

In 2018, Mondello Park hosted Round 6 of the Drift Masters European Championship, and has been on the event's calendar ever since, although it was not used in the 2020 season due to COVID-19.

The 2019 motor racing season at Mondello Park consisted of car racing days, six rallycross racing days, seven drift days and 26 motorcycle racing days.

In the 2020 motor racing season Mondello Park had plans to host 16 car racing days, seven rallycross racing days, 12 drift days and 14 motorbike racing days, however, the calendar was disrupted by COVID-19 pandemic restrictions.

In 2021 Mondello Park signed a 5-year deal to promote and organise Irish Circuit Racing. In past years, various Irish Motor Clubs shared this task. Irish Circuit Racing consisted of five two-day events in 2021.

== The circuit ==
It was established in 1968.

Situated on 110 acres the facility incorporates 3.621 km (2.250 mi) of race track, 24 race garages and 12 Hospitality Suites. It is host to national and international race events, motor shows, car & bike track days, training schools and corporate events.

The Circuit also has 3 km of extreme off-road driving trails and a 5-acre off-road activities centre and the Museum of Motorsport.

== Lap records ==
As of October 2023, the fastest official race lap records at the Mondello Park are listed as:

Category	Time	Driver	Vehicle	Event
International Circuit: 3.621 km (1998–present)
Formula One	1:28.708	Johnny Laursen	Benetton B197	2006 Mondello Park EuroBOSS round
Formula Three	1:32.266	Álvaro Parente	Dallara F305	2005 Mondello Park British F3 round
WSC	1:33.268	Christian Pescatori	Ferrari 333 SP	2001 FIA Sportscar Championship Mondello
LMP675	1:37.205	Thed Björk	Lola B2K/40	2001 FIA Sportscar Championship Mondello
Superbike	1:38.604	Jonathan Rea	Honda CBR1000RR	2007 Mondello Park BSB round
Formula Palmer Audi	1:39.430	Howard Spooner	Formula Palmer Audi car	2001 Mondello Park Formula Palmer Audi round
Formula BMW	1:40.534	Michael Meadows	Mygale FB02	2006 Mondello Park Formula BMW UK round
Supersport	1:41.039	Dennis Hobbs	Honda CBR600RR	2007 Mondello Park BSS round
GT2	1:41.172	Tim Mullen	Ferrari 360 Modena GTC	2005 Mondello Park British GT round
Porsche Carrera Cup	1:42.656	Damien Faulkner	Porsche 911 (997) GT3 Cup	2006 Mondello Park Porsche Carrera Cup GB round
BTC Touring	1:46.094	Matt Neal	BTC-T Honda Integra Type R	2006 Mondello Park BTCC round
Super 2000	1:46.180	Jason Plato	SEAT León Super 2000	2006 Mondello Park BTCC round
F1600	1:47.975	Scott Malvern	Ray GRS08	2009 Mondello Formula Ford 1600 Ireland round
National Circuit: 1.860 km (1969–present)
EuroBOSS	0:47.380	Sylvie Mullins	Gould GR55B	2023 Mondello Park BOSS Ireland Round
Formula Two	0:56.000	John Watson (Note: Both drivers took the same lap time independently.); Peter Westbury	Brabham BT30; Brabham BT36	1971 Leinster Trophy

== Layout configurations ==
“Intermediate Circuit”

“International Circuit”

“National Circuit”

“Short Circuit”

The "Reverse Circuit" has also been used as a variation in National and Rallycross configurations.

== Simulation / Video Game ==
This racetrack appears in the videogames Need For Speed: ProStreet, CarX Drift Racing Online, GT Legends, and TOCA Race Driver 3.

It is also available for Assetto Corsa as third-party content through the official laser scanning of the present layout, or a made-from-scratch recreation of the track in its 1987 form.
