= 2005 British Touring Car Championship =

48th season of the British Touring Car Championship

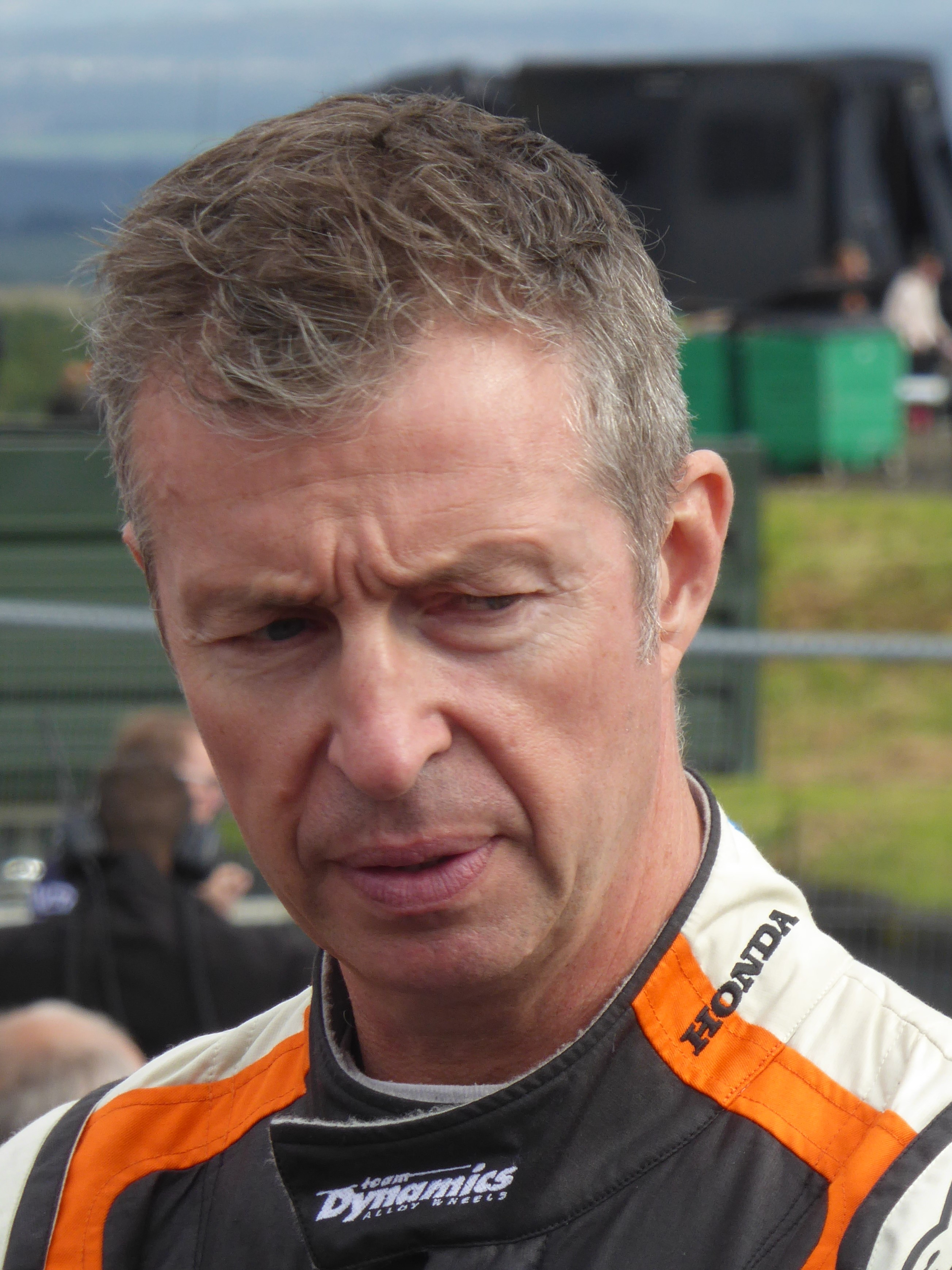
2005 BTCC champion, Matt Neal.

The 2005 Dunlop MSA British Touring Car Championship season was the 48th British Touring Car Championship (BTCC) season. As in 2004, there were ten racing weekends at nine different circuits; each round comprising three races, making a thirty round competition in total.

== Changes for 2005 ==
=== Teams and drivers ===
After 2004 saw the BTCC boasting its largest number of entries since the height of the Super Touring era in the 1990s, the following season brought a significant decline in interest. Proton and Honda pulled their manufacturer support from the series, with many of the smaller independent teams also deciding against returning.

Reigning champions Vauxhall stayed on as one of the two remaining manufacturers, dropping its Astra Coupe after four straight titles with the chassis, and introducing the all new Astra Sport Hatch (again prepared by Triple 8). Reigning champion James Thompson had left the BTCC to contest the World Touring Car Championship with Alfa Romeo, leaving the 2004 runner-up and 2003 champion Yvan Muller to head the team. SEAT Cupra Cup graduate Gavin Smith joined the team after appearing in an Astra Coupe for GA Motorsport at one meeting in 2004, and Colin Turkington moved into Thompson's seat after two promising seasons with the WSR MG squad.

Their only manufacturer opposition came from SEAT, expanding their effort to three Super 2000-spec Toledos for their second season. RML Group which prepared the cars in 2004 were unable to continue in 2005, having secured the contract to run Chevrolet's World Touring Car Championship programme. Instead, Northern South, which had been preparing cars in the 2003 and 2004 SEAT Cupra Championship stepped in to run the SEAT BTCC programme. 2001 champion Jason Plato remained as team leader, but Rob Huff departed with RML to join the Chevrolet WTCC campaign. He was replaced by Luke Hines, moving from Vauxhall, with James Pickford taking the third seat as reward for winning the SEAT Cupra Cup in 2004.

Team Dynamics took a brave gamble by replacing their Honda Civic Type Rs with a pair of brand new, self-developed Integras. Matt Neal and Dan Eaves remained as drivers. A third car was entered late in the season for Gareth Howell in order to support Neal's title campaign. West Surrey Racing again campaigned the MG ZS as an independent entry after MG Rover withdrew their support at the end of 2003. Rob Collard moved from his self-run Astra Coupe to fill Colin Turkington's seat, but a second driver with sufficient budget could not be found.

Arena Motorsport also continued their campaign despite losing manufacturer support, entering a single Honda Civic Type-R for the returning Tom Chilton from the second round onwards. A second entry for Alan Morrison was also registered but never raced.

The only other full-time returnees were Synchro Motorsport, with James Kaye driving their ex-works Civic Type-R once again.

Two new squads joined the series, both on very low budgets. SpeedEquipe (as HPI Racing) graduated from the Renault Clio Cup together with their drivers Richard Williams and Ian Curley, to run Lexus IS200s, while Fast-Tec Motorsports and team owner/driver Mark Proctor moved from the SCSA stock car series to run the Astra Coupe that Rob Collard had taken to the Independents title in 2003.

Kartworld Racing returned mid-season with team principal Jason Hughes again racing an ex-works MG ZS, as did Tech-Speed Motorsport running their Astra Coupe (now bio-ethanol powered) for rookie Fiona Leggate. Daniels Motorsport entered another Astra Coupe for Andy Neate for the final round at Brands Hatch.

Gary Ayles' team intended to enter a single Alfa Romeo 156 for Jamie Spence, although the initial plan was to run two cars, and John Batchelor intended to return to the driver's seat in the Super 2000 Honda Civic but this time, under the Team Firstserve Group banner, neither of these entries eventuated.

=== Other changes ===
- Dunlop were announced as the new title sponsor of the series
- The grid for race three was determined by race two's finishing order but with the top ten positions reversed. In 2004 this rule had applied to race two based on the finishing order of race one.
- The cars of the championship's top five drivers carried "Championship Ballast" for each race meeting's practice, qualifying and first race. Success Ballast was then carried in race two by the top five finishers from race one and in race three by the top five finishers from race two respectively.
- 'Negative' ballast for finishing outside the top five in races was abolished
- Tyres were limited to 16 new slicks per race weekend, but with no limit on wet-weather tyres
- All teams were permitted only up to four days' testing during the season
- Teams were permitted to build their own Super 2000 specification cars and enter them for the championship even if they did not have proper FIA homologation. Provided they met all current S2000 requirements the BTCC was able to grant the cars 'local homologation'.

== Teams and drivers ==
| Team | Car | No. | Drivers | Rounds |
Works BTC-T Entries
| VX Racing | Vauxhall Astra Sport Hatch | 2 | (France) Yvan Muller | All |
| VX Racing | Vauxhall Astra Sport Hatch | 6 | (United Kingdom) Colin Turkington | All |
| VX Racing | Vauxhall Astra Sport Hatch | 88 | (Republic of Ireland) Gavin Smith | All |
Works S2000 Entries
| SEAT Sport UK | SEAT Toledo Cupra | 11 | (United Kingdom) Jason Plato | All |
| SEAT Sport UK | SEAT Toledo Cupra | 12 | (United Kingdom) James Pickford | All |
| SEAT Sport UK | SEAT Toledo Cupra | 57 | (United Kingdom) Luke Hines | All |
Independent BTC-T Entries
| Team Halfords | Honda Integra Type-R | 5 | (United Kingdom) Matt Neal | All |
| Team Halfords | Honda Integra Type-R | 8 | (United Kingdom) Dan Eaves | All |
| Team Halfords | Honda Integra Type-R | 25 | (United Kingdom) Gareth Howell | 8–10 |
| Arena Motorsport | Honda Civic Type-R | 9 | (United Kingdom) Tom Chilton | 2–9 |
| Arena Motorsport | Honda Civic Type-R | 99 | (United Kingdom) Alan Morrison | None |
| Synchro Motorsport | Honda Civic Type-R | 10 | (United Kingdom) James Kaye | 1–9 |
| Synchro Motorsport | Honda Civic Type-R | 31 | (United Kingdom) James Kaye | 10 |
| West Surrey Racing | MG ZS | 21 | (United Kingdom) Rob Collard | All |
| Fast-Tec Motorsport | Vauxhall Astra Coupé | 23 | (United Kingdom) Mark Proctor | 1, 3–10 |
| Kartworld Racing | MG ZS | 36 | (United Kingdom) Jason Hughes | 6, 8, 10 |
| Team Nuts with Daniels Motorsport | Vauxhall Astra Coupé | 44 | (United Kingdom) Andy Neate | 10 |
| Tech-Speed Motorsport | Vauxhall Astra Coupé | 82 | (United Kingdom) Fiona Leggate | 5–10 |
Independent S2000 Entries
| GA Motorsport | Alfa Romeo 156 | 15 | (United Kingdom) Jamie Spence | None |
| Team Firstserve Group | Honda Civic Type-R | 33 | (United Kingdom) John Batchelor | None |
| HPI Racing with Friends Reunited | Lexus IS200 | 77 | (United Kingdom) Richard Williams | All |
| HPI Racing with Friends Reunited | Lexus IS200 | 78 | (United Kingdom) Ian Curley | 3–10 |

- GA Motorsport, Team Firstserve Group and Alan Morrison all appeared on the official entry list but none of these entries eventuated.

== Season Calendar ==
All races were held in the United Kingdom (excepting Mondello Park round that held in Ireland).

| Round | | Circuit | Date | Pole position | Fastest lap | Winning driver | Winning team |
|---|---|---|---|---|---|---|---|
| 1 | R1 | Donington Park National | 10 April | (United Kingdom) Colin Turkington | (France) Yvan Muller | (United Kingdom) Matt Neal | Team Halfords |
| 1 | R2 | Donington Park National | 10 April | | (United Kingdom) Rob Collard | (France) Yvan Muller | VX Racing |
| 1 | R3 | Donington Park National | 10 April | | (United Kingdom) Dan Eaves | (United Kingdom) Matt Neal | Team Halfords |
| 2 | R4 | Thruxton Circuit, Hampshire | 1 May | (United Kingdom) Tom Chilton | (United Kingdom) Tom Chilton | (United Kingdom) Dan Eaves | Team Halfords |
| 2 | R5 | Thruxton Circuit, Hampshire | 1 May | | (United Kingdom) Dan Eaves | (United Kingdom) Dan Eaves | Team Halfords |
| 2 | R6 | Thruxton Circuit, Hampshire | 1 May | | (United Kingdom) Jason Plato | (United Kingdom) Dan Eaves | Team Halfords |
| 3 | R7 | Brands Hatch Indy, Kent | 5 June | (United Kingdom) Matt Neal | (United Kingdom) James Pickford | (United Kingdom) Matt Neal | Team Halfords |
| 3 | R8 | Brands Hatch Indy, Kent | 5 June | | (United Kingdom) Dan Eaves | (United Kingdom) Matt Neal | Team Halfords |
| 3 | R9 | Brands Hatch Indy, Kent | 5 June | | (United Kingdom) Tom Chilton | (France) Yvan Muller | VX Racing |
| 4 | R10 | Oulton Park Island, Cheshire | 19 June | (United Kingdom) Jason Plato | (United Kingdom) Matt Neal | (United Kingdom) Jason Plato | SEAT Sport UK |
| 4 | R11 | Oulton Park Island, Cheshire | 19 June | | (United Kingdom) Matt Neal | (United Kingdom) Matt Neal | Team Halfords |
| 4 | R12 | Oulton Park Island, Cheshire | 19 June | | (United Kingdom) Jason Plato | (United Kingdom) Tom Chilton | Arena Motorsport |
| 5 | R13 | Croft Circuit, Yorkshire | 17 July | (United Kingdom) Colin Turkington | (United Kingdom) Colin Turkington | (United Kingdom) Colin Turkington | VX Racing |
| 5 | R14 | Croft Circuit, Yorkshire | 17 July | | (France) Yvan Muller | (France) Yvan Muller | VX Racing |
| 5 | R15 | Croft Circuit, Yorkshire | 17 July | | (United Kingdom) Dan Eaves | (United Kingdom) Dan Eaves | Team Halfords |
| 6 | R16 | Mondello Park | 24 July | (France) Yvan Muller | (France) Yvan Muller | (France) Yvan Muller | VX Racing |
| 6 | R17 | Mondello Park | 24 July | | (United Kingdom) Matt Neal | (United Kingdom) Colin Turkington | VX Racing |
| 6 | R18 | Mondello Park | 24 July | | (France) Yvan Muller | (France) Yvan Muller | VX Racing |
| 7 | R19 | Snetterton Motor Racing Circuit, Norfolk | 7 August | (United Kingdom) Tom Chilton | (United Kingdom) Matt Neal | (United Kingdom) Tom Chilton | Arena Motorsport |
| 7 | R20 | Snetterton Motor Racing Circuit, Norfolk | 7 August | | (United Kingdom) Matt Neal | (United Kingdom) Tom Chilton | Arena Motorsport |
| 7 | R21 | Snetterton Motor Racing Circuit, Norfolk | 7 August | | (France) Yvan Muller | (United Kingdom) Jason Plato | SEAT Sport UK |
| 8 | R22 | Knockhill Racing Circuit, Fife | 28 August | (United Kingdom) Colin Turkington | (United Kingdom) Matt Neal | (France) Yvan Muller | VX Racing |
| 8 | R23 | Knockhill Racing Circuit, Fife | 28 August | | (United Kingdom) Matt Neal | (United Kingdom) Matt Neal | Team Halfords |
| 8 | R24 | Knockhill Racing Circuit, Fife | 28 August | | (United Kingdom) Matt Neal | (United Kingdom) Rob Collard | West Surrey Racing |
| 9 | R25 | Silverstone National | 18 September | (United Kingdom) Gareth Howell | (United Kingdom) Jason Plato | (United Kingdom) Tom Chilton | Arena Motorsport |
| 9 | R26 | Silverstone National | 18 September | | (United Kingdom) Gareth Howell | (United Kingdom) Luke Hines | SEAT Sport UK |
| 9 | R27 | Silverstone National | 18 September | | (United Kingdom) Gareth Howell | (United Kingdom) Gareth Howell | Team Halfords |
| 10 | R28 | Brands Hatch GP, Kent | 2 October | (United Kingdom) Dan Eaves | (United Kingdom) Dan Eaves | (United Kingdom) Dan Eaves | Team Halfords |
| 10 | R29 | Brands Hatch GP, Kent | 2 October | | (United Kingdom) Matt Neal | (United Kingdom) Jason Plato | SEAT Sport UK |
| 10 | R30 | Brands Hatch GP, Kent | 2 October | | (United Kingdom) Rob Collard | (United Kingdom) Rob Collard | West Surrey Racing |

== Championship Standings ==
Points system
| **1st** | **2nd** | **3rd** | **4th** | **5th** | **6th** | **7th** | **8th** | **9th** | **10th** | Fastest lap | Lead a lap |
| 15 | 12 | 10 | 8 | 6 | 5 | 4 | 3 | 2 | 1 | 1 | 1 |

- No driver may collect more than one "Lead a Lap" point per race no matter how many laps they lead.
- Race 1 polesitter receives 1 point.

=== Drivers Championship ===
(key)

| Pos | Driver | DON | | | THR | | | BHI | | | OUL | | | CRO | | | MON | | | SNE | | | KNO | | | SIL | | | BHGP | | | Pts |
|---|---|---|---|---|---|---|---|---|---|---|---|---|---|---|---|---|---|---|---|---|---|---|---|---|---|---|---|---|---|---|---|---|
| 1 | (United Kingdom) Matt Neal | 1* | **3** | 1* | 3 | 2 | 4 | **1*** | **1*** | 6 | 2 | 1* | 2 | 3 | 6 | 2 | 3 | 3 | 7 | 3 | 3 | 4 | 2 | 1* | 2 | 9 | 4 | 7 | 4 | 3 | 5 | 316 |
| 2 | (France) Yvan Muller | 2* | 1* | 3 | 6 | 3 | 3 | 3 | 4 | 1* | 4 | 2 | Ret | 2 | 1* | 8 | **1*** | **6** | 1* | 4 | 4 | 3 | 1* | **2*** | Ret | 4 | Ret | 5 | 2 | 11 | Ret | 273 |
| 3 | (United Kingdom) Dan Eaves | 3 | 4 | 2 | 1* | **1*** | 1* | Ret | 3 | 2 | 3 | 3 | 6 | 5 | 10 | **1*** | 6 | 2 | 4 | 2 | 2 | 5 | 4 | Ret | 6 | Ret | 3 | 4 | **1*** | **2*** | Ret | 269 |
| 4 | (United Kingdom) Jason Plato | 6 | 5 | 6* | 2* | 5 | 5* | 4 | 2 | 3 | **1*** | **10*** | **3** | 4 | 13 | 3 | 2 | 10 | **Ret** | Ret | 10 | **1*** | 6 | 8 | 5 | 3 | DSQ | 6 | 3 | 1* | Ret | 208 |
| 5 | (United Kingdom) Tom Chilton | | | | **10*** | 6 | Ret | 7 | NC | 7 | 5 | 5 | 1* | 6 | 3 | 9 | 9 | 8* | 2* | **1*** | **1*** | 7 | 5 | 3 | 3 | 1* | **8*** | 3 | | | | 175 |
| 6 | (United Kingdom) Colin Turkington | **5** | Ret | 8 | 4 | 7 | 2 | 2 | 5 | 5 | 10 | 6 | Ret | **1*** | **2** | 7 | 4 | 1* | 5 | 7 | 7 | Ret | **3** | 4 | 7 | 7 | Ret | 9 | 7 | Ret | 6 | 174 |
| 7 | (United Kingdom) Rob Collard | 4 | 2 | 4 | 5 | 11 | Ret | 6 | 6 | Ret | 8 | 4 | 4* | 7 | 4 | 5 | 5 | 4 | 3 | 5 | 5 | 12 | 9 | 9 | 1* | 10 | 10 | **2*** | Ret | 9 | 1* | 173 |
| 8 | (United Kingdom) James Pickford | 9 | 7 | 7 | 7 | 4 | 6 | 9 | 8 | DSQ | 9 | 7 | 7 | 10 | 8 | 4 | 11 | 9 | Ret | 6 | 9 | 2 | Ret | 12 | Ret | 2 | 6 | 8 | 9 | 5 | 2 | 116 |
| 9 | (United Kingdom) Luke Hines | 7 | 8 | 9 | 8 | 8 | 8* | 5 | Ret | Ret | 7 | Ret | 5 | Ret | 9 | 6 | 12 | 5 | Ret | 10 | 8 | Ret | 7 | 5 | Ret | 6 | 1* | Ret | Ret | 7 | Ret | 87 |
| 10 | (Republic of Ireland) Gavin Smith | 8 | 6 | 5 | 9 | 10 | **Ret** | 10 | 7 | Ret | 6 | 11 | Ret | 8 | 7 | Ret | 7 | Ret | 6 | 9 | 11 | 8 | 8 | Ret | Ret | 11 | 2 | 11 | 6 | 4 | 3 | 86 |
| 11 | (United Kingdom) James Kaye | Ret | Ret | Ret | Ret | 9 | 7 | 8 | Ret | 4 | 11 | DNS | Ret | 9 | 5 | Ret | 8 | Ret | 11 | 8 | 6 | 6 | 10 | Ret | Ret | 8 | Ret | 10 | 8 | 6 | 7 | 58 |
| 12 | (United Kingdom) Gareth Howell | | | | | | | | | | | | | | | | | | | | | | Ret* | 6 | 4 | **5** | Ret* | 1* | 5 | DSQ | 4 | 54 |
| 13 | (United Kingdom) Jason Hughes | | | | | | | | | | | | | | | | 10 | 7 | 8 | | | | 11 | 7 | 8 | | | | 10 | 8 | 8 | 22 |
| 14 | (United Kingdom) Richard Williams | NC | 9 | **11** | DNS | DNS | DNS | Ret | DNS | 9 | 13 | 9 | Ret | 13 | 12 | Ret | 15 | 12 | 13 | 13 | 12 | 9 | DNS | Ret | DNS | 12 | 7 | Ret | 11 | Ret | 9 | 14 |
| 15 | (United Kingdom) Mark Proctor | 10 | Ret | 10 | | | | Ret | DNS | 8 | 12 | 8 | Ret | Ret | DNS | DNS | 14 | Ret | 10 | 12 | Ret | 11 | 13 | 10 | **10** | Ret | 9 | 12 | NC | Ret | 13 | 13 |
| 16 | (United Kingdom) Fiona Leggate | | | | | | | | | | | | | 11 | 14 | 10 | 13 | 13 | 9 | 11 | 13 | DNS | 14 | 11 | 9 | 13 | 5 | 13 | 13 | Ret | 10 | 12 |
| 17 | (United Kingdom) Ian Curley | | | | | | | NC | 9 | **NC** | DNS | DNS | DNS | 12 | 11 | Ret | 16 | 11 | 12 | 14 | Ret | 10 | 12 | Ret | DNS | 14 | 11 | 14 | 14 | 12 | 12 | 3 |
| 18 | (United Kingdom) Andy Neate | | | | | | | | | | | | | | | | | | | | | | | | | | | | 12 | 10 | **11** | 1 |
| Pos | Driver | DON | | | THR | | | BHI | | | OUL | | | CRO | | | MON | | | SNE | | | KNO | | | SIL | | | BHGP | | | Pts |
Sources:

- Note: **bold** signifies pole position (1 point given in first race only, and race 2 and 3 poles are based on race results), italics signifies fastest lap (1 point given all races) and * signifies at least one lap in the lead (1 point given all races).

=== Manufacturers Championship ===
| Pos | Manufacturer | DON | | | THR | | | BHI | | | OUL | | | CRO | | | MON | | | SNE | | | KNO | | | SIL | | | BHGP | | | Pts |
|---|---|---|---|---|---|---|---|---|---|---|---|---|---|---|---|---|---|---|---|---|---|---|---|---|---|---|---|---|---|---|---|---|
| 1 | Vauxhall / VX Racing | 2 | 1 | 3 | 4 | 3 | 2 | 2 | 4 | 1 | 4 | 2 | Ret | 1 | 1 | 7 | 1 | 1 | 1 | 4 | 4 | 3 | 1 | 2 | 7 | 4 | 2 | 5 | 2 | 4 | 3 | 781 |
| 1 | Vauxhall / VX Racing | 5 | 6 | 5 | 6 | 7 | 3 | 3 | 5 | 5 | 6 | 6 | Ret | 2 | 2 | 8 | 4 | 6 | 5 | 7 | 7 | 8 | 3 | 4 | Ret | 7 | Ret | 9 | 6 | 11 | 6 | 781 |
| 1 | Vauxhall / VX Racing | 8 | Ret | 8 | 9 | 10 | Ret | 10 | 7 | Ret | 10 | 11 | Ret | 8 | 7 | Ret | 7 | Ret | 6 | 9 | 11 | Ret | 8 | Ret | Ret | 11 | Ret | 11 | 7 | Ret | Ret | 781 |
| 2 | SEAT / SEAT Sport UK | 6 | 5 | 6 | 2 | 4 | 5 | 4 | 2 | 3 | 1 | 7 | 3 | 4 | 8 | 3 | 2 | 5 | Ret | 6 | 8 | 1 | 6 | 5 | 5 | 2 | 1 | 6 | 3 | 1 | 2 | 629 |
| 2 | SEAT / SEAT Sport UK | 7 | 7 | 7 | 7 | 5 | 6 | 5 | 8 | Ret | 7 | 10 | 5 | 10 | 9 | 4 | 11 | 9 | Ret | 10 | 9 | 2 | 7 | 8 | Ret | 3 | 6 | 8 | 9 | 5 | Ret | 629 |
| 2 | SEAT / SEAT Sport UK | 9 | 8 | 9 | 8 | 8 | 8 | 9 | Ret | DSQ | 9 | Ret | 7 | Ret | 13 | 6 | 12 | 10 | Ret | Ret | 10 | Ret | Ret | 12 | Ret | 6 | DSQ | Ret | Ret | 7 | Ret | 629 |

=== Teams Championship ===
| Pos | Team | DON | | | THR | | | BHI | | | OUL | | | CRO | | | MON | | | SNE | | | KNO | | | SIL | | | BHGP | | | Pts |
|---|---|---|---|---|---|---|---|---|---|---|---|---|---|---|---|---|---|---|---|---|---|---|---|---|---|---|---|---|---|---|---|---|
| 1 | Team Halfords | 1 | 3 | 1 | 1 | 1 | 1 | 1 | 1 | 2 | 2 | 1 | 2 | 3 | 6 | 1 | 3 | 2 | 4 | 2 | 2 | 4 | 2 | 1 | 2 | 5 | 3 | 1 | 1 | 2 | 4 | 573 |
| 1 | Team Halfords | 3 | 4 | 2 | 3 | 2 | 4 | Ret | 3 | 6 | 3 | 3 | 6 | 5 | 10 | 2 | 6 | 3 | 7 | 3 | 3 | 5 | 4 | 6 | 4 | 9 | 4 | 4 | 4 | 3 | 5 | 573 |
| 2 | VX Racing | 2 | 1 | 3 | 4 | 3 | 2 | 2 | 4 | 1 | 4 | 2 | Ret | 1 | 1 | 7 | 1 | 1 | 1 | 4 | 4 | 3 | 1 | 2 | 7 | 4 | 2 | 5 | 2 | 4 | 3 | 470 |
| 2 | VX Racing | 5 | 6 | 5 | 6 | 7 | 3 | 3 | 5 | 5 | 6 | 6 | Ret | 2 | 2 | 8 | 4 | 6 | 5 | 7 | 7 | 8 | 3 | 4 | Ret | 7 | Ret | 9 | 6 | 11 | 6 | 470 |
| 3 | SEAT Sport UK | 6 | 5 | 6 | 2 | 4 | 5 | 4 | 2 | 3 | 1 | 7 | 3 | 4 | 8 | 3 | 2 | 5 | Ret | 6 | 8 | 1 | 6 | 5 | 5 | 2 | 1 | 6 | 3 | 1 | 2 | 306 |
| 3 | SEAT Sport UK | 7 | 7 | 7 | 7 | 5 | 6 | 5 | 8 | Ret | 7 | 10 | 5 | 10 | 9 | 4 | 11 | 9 | Ret | 10 | 9 | 2 | 7 | 8 | Ret | 3 | 6 | 8 | 9 | 5 | Ret | 306 |
| 4 | West Surrey Racing | 4 | 2 | 4 | 5 | 11 | Ret | 6 | 6 | Ret | 8 | 4 | 4 | 7 | 4 | 5 | 5 | 4 | 3 | 5 | 5 | 12 | 9 | 9 | 1 | 10 | 10 | 2 | Ret | 9 | 1 | 172 |
| 5 | Arena Motorsport | | | | 10 | 6 | Ret | 7 | NC | 7 | 5 | 5 | 1 | 6 | 3 | 9 | 9 | 8 | 2 | 1 | 1 | 7 | 5 | 3 | 3 | 1 | 8 | 3 | | | | 157 |
| 6 | Synchro Motorsport | Ret | Ret | Ret | Ret | 9 | 7 | 8 | Ret | 4 | 11 | DNS | Ret | 9 | 5 | Ret | 8 | Ret | 11 | 8 | 6 | 6 | 10 | Ret | Ret | 8 | Ret | 10 | 8 | 6 | 7 | 49 |
| 7 | Kartworld Racing | | | | | | | | | | | | | | | | 10 | 7 | 8 | | | | 11 | 7 | 8 | | | | 10 | 8 | 8 | 29 |
| 8 | HPI Racing with Friends Reunited | NC | 9 | 11 | DNS | DNS | DNS | NC | 9 | 9 | 13 | 9 | Ret | 12 | 11 | Ret | 15 | 11 | 12 | 13 | 12 | 9 | 12 | Ret | DNS | 12 | 7 | 14 | 11 | 12 | 9 | 27 |
| 8 | HPI Racing with Friends Reunited | | | | | | | Ret | DNS | NC | DNS | DNS | DNS | 13 | 12 | Ret | 16 | 12 | 13 | 14 | Ret | 10 | DNS | Ret | DNS | 14 | 11 | Ret | 14 | Ret | 12 | 27 |
| 9 | Fast-Tec Motorsport | 10 | Ret | 10 | | | | Ret | DNS | 8 | 12 | 8 | Ret | Ret | DNS | DNS | 14 | Ret | 10 | 12 | Ret | 11 | 13 | 10 | 10 | Ret | 9 | 12 | NC | Ret | 13 | 21 |
| 10 | Tech-Speed Motorsport | | | | | | | | | | | | | 11 | 14 | 10 | 13 | 13 | 9 | 11 | 13 | DNS | 14 | 11 | 9 | 13 | 5 | 13 | 13 | Ret | 10 | 17 |
| 11 | Team Nuts with Daniels Motorsport | | | | | | | | | | | | | | | | | | | | | | | | | | | | 12 | 10 | 11 | 3 |
| Pos | Team | DON | | | THR | | | BHI | | | OUL | | | CRO | | | MON | | | SNE | | | KNO | | | SIL | | | BHGP | | | Pts |

=== Independents Trophy ===
| Pos | Driver | DON | | | THR | | | BHI | | | OUL | | | CRO | | | MON | | | SNE | | | KNO | | | SIL | | | BHGP | | | Pts |
|---|---|---|---|---|---|---|---|---|---|---|---|---|---|---|---|---|---|---|---|---|---|---|---|---|---|---|---|---|---|---|---|---|
| 1 | (United Kingdom) Matt Neal | **1** | **3** | 1 | 3 | 2 | 4 | **1** | **1** | 6 | **2** | **1** | 2 | **3** | **6** | 2 | **3** | **3** | 7 | 3 | 3 | 4 | 2 | **1** | 2 | 9 | 4 | 7 | 4 | 3 | 5 | 367 |
| 2 | (United Kingdom) Dan Eaves | 3 | 4 | 2 | 1 | **1** | 1 | Ret | 3 | 2 | 3 | 3 | 6 | 5 | 10 | **1** | 6 | 2 | 4 | 2 | 2 | 5 | 4 | Ret | 6 | Ret | 3 | 4 | **1** | **2** | Ret | 313 |
| 3 | (United Kingdom) Rob Collard | 4 | 2 | 4 | 5 | 11 | Ret | 6 | 6 | Ret | 8 | 4 | 4 | 7 | 4 | 5 | 5 | 4 | 3 | 5 | 5 | 12 | 9 | 9 | 1 | 10 | 10 | **2** | Ret | 9 | 1 | 256 |
| 4 | (United Kingdom) Tom Chilton | | | | **10** | 6 | Ret | 7 | NC | 7 | 5 | 5 | 1 | 6 | 3 | 9 | 9 | 8 | **2** | **1** | **1** | 7 | 5 | 3 | 3 | 1 | **8** | 3 | | | | 230 |
| 5 | (United Kingdom) James Kaye | Ret | Ret | Ret | Ret | 9 | **7** | 8 | Ret | 4 | 11 | DNS | Ret | 9 | 5 | Ret | 8 | Ret | 11 | 8 | 6 | **6** | 10 | Ret | Ret | 8 | Ret | 10 | 8 | 6 | 7 | 140 |
| 6 | (United Kingdom) Richard Williams | NC | 9 | **11** | DNS | DNS | DNS | Ret | DNS | 9 | 13 | 9 | **Ret** | 13 | 12 | Ret | 15 | 12 | 13 | 13 | 12 | 9 | DNS | Ret | DNS | 12 | 7 | Ret | 11 | Ret | 9 | 79 |
| 7 | (United Kingdom) Mark Proctor | 10 | Ret | 10 | | | | Ret | DNS | 8 | 12 | 8 | Ret | Ret | DNS | DNS | 14 | Ret | 10 | 12 | Ret | 11 | 13 | 10 | **10** | Ret | 9 | 12 | NC | Ret | 13 | 70 |
| 8 | (United Kingdom) Fiona Leggate | | | | | | | | | | | | | 11 | 14 | 10 | 13 | 13 | 9 | 11 | 13 | DNS | 14 | 11 | 9 | 13 | 5 | 13 | 13 | Ret | 10 | 69 |
| 9 | (United Kingdom) Gareth Howell | | | | | | | | | | | | | | | | | | | | | | **Ret** | 6 | 4 | **5** | Ret | 1 | 5 | DSQ | 4 | 67 |
| 10 | (United Kingdom) Jason Hughes | | | | | | | | | | | | | | | | 10 | 7 | 8 | | | | 11 | 7 | 8 | | | | 10 | 8 | 8 | 57 |
| 11 | (United Kingdom) Ian Curley | | | | | | | NC | 9 | **NC** | DNS | DNS | DNS | 12 | 11 | Ret | 16 | 11 | 12 | 14 | Ret | 10 | 12 | Ret | DNS | 14 | 11 | 14 | 14 | 12 | 12 | 52 |
| 12 | (United Kingdom) Andy Neate | | | | | | | | | | | | | | | | | | | | | | | | | | | | 12 | 10 | **11** | 12 |
| Pos | Driver | DON | | | THR | | | BHI | | | OUL | | | CRO | | | MON | | | SNE | | | KNO | | | SIL | | | BHGP | | | Pts |

=== Independent Teams Championship ===
| Pos | Team | DON | | | THR | | | BHI | | | OUL | | | CRO | | | MON | | | SNE | | | KNO | | | SIL | | | BHGP | | | Pts |
|---|---|---|---|---|---|---|---|---|---|---|---|---|---|---|---|---|---|---|---|---|---|---|---|---|---|---|---|---|---|---|---|---|
| 1 | Team Halfords | 1 | 3 | 1 | 1 | 1 | 1 | 1 | 1 | 2 | 2 | 1 | 2 | 3 | 6 | 1 | 3 | 2 | 4 | 2 | 2 | 4 | 2 | 1 | 2 | 5 | 3 | 1 | 1 | 2 | 4 | 725 |
| 1 | Team Halfords | 3 | 4 | 2 | 3 | 2 | 4 | Ret | 3 | 6 | 3 | 3 | 6 | 5 | 10 | 2 | 6 | 3 | 7 | 3 | 3 | 5 | 4 | 6 | 4 | 9 | 4 | 4 | 4 | 3 | 5 | 725 |
| 2 | West Surrey Racing | 4 | 2 | 4 | 5 | 11 | Ret | 6 | 6 | Ret | 8 | 4 | 4 | 7 | 4 | 5 | 5 | 4 | 3 | 5 | 5 | 12 | 9 | 9 | 1 | 10 | 10 | 2 | Ret | 9 | 1 | 256 |
| 3 | Arena Motorsport | | | | 10 | 6 | Ret | 7 | NC | 7 | 5 | 5 | 1 | 6 | 3 | 9 | 9 | 8 | 2 | 1 | 1 | 7 | 5 | 3 | 3 | 1 | 8 | 3 | | | | 230 |
| 4 | Synchro Motorsport | Ret | Ret | Ret | Ret | 9 | 7 | 8 | Ret | 4 | 11 | DNS | Ret | 9 | 5 | Ret | 8 | Ret | 11 | 8 | 6 | 6 | 10 | Ret | Ret | 8 | Ret | 10 | 8 | 6 | 7 | 143 |
| 5 | HPI Racing with Friends Reunited | NC | 9 | 11 | DNS | DNS | DNS | NC | 9 | 9 | 13 | 9 | Ret | 12 | 11 | Ret | 15 | 11 | 12 | 13 | 12 | 9 | 12 | Ret | DNS | 12 | 7 | 14 | 11 | 12 | 9 | 134 |
| 5 | HPI Racing with Friends Reunited | | | | | | | Ret | DNS | NC | DNS | DNS | DNS | 13 | 12 | Ret | 16 | 12 | 13 | 14 | Ret | 10 | DNS | Ret | DNS | 14 | 11 | Ret | 14 | Ret | 12 | 134 |
| 6 | Fast-Tec Motorsport | 10 | Ret | 10 | | | | Ret | DNS | 8 | 12 | 8 | Ret | Ret | DNS | DNS | 14 | Ret | 10 | 12 | Ret | 11 | 13 | 10 | 10 | Ret | 9 | 12 | NC | Ret | 13 | 73 |
| 7 | Tech-Speed Motorsport | | | | | | | | | | | | | 11 | 14 | 10 | 13 | 13 | 9 | 11 | 13 | DNS | 14 | 11 | 9 | 13 | 5 | 13 | 13 | Ret | 10 | 72 |
| 8 | Kartworld Racing | | | | | | | | | | | | | | | | 10 | 7 | 8 | | | | 11 | 7 | 8 | | | | 10 | 8 | 8 | 60 |
| 9 | Team Nuts with Daniels Motorsport | | | | | | | | | | | | | | | | | | | | | | | | | | | | 12 | 10 | 11 | 13 |
| Pos | Team | DON | | | THR | | | BHI | | | OUL | | | CRO | | | MON | | | SNE | | | KNO | | | SIL | | | BHGP | | | Pts |
