= Rob Collard =

British racing driver (born 1968)

Robert Collard
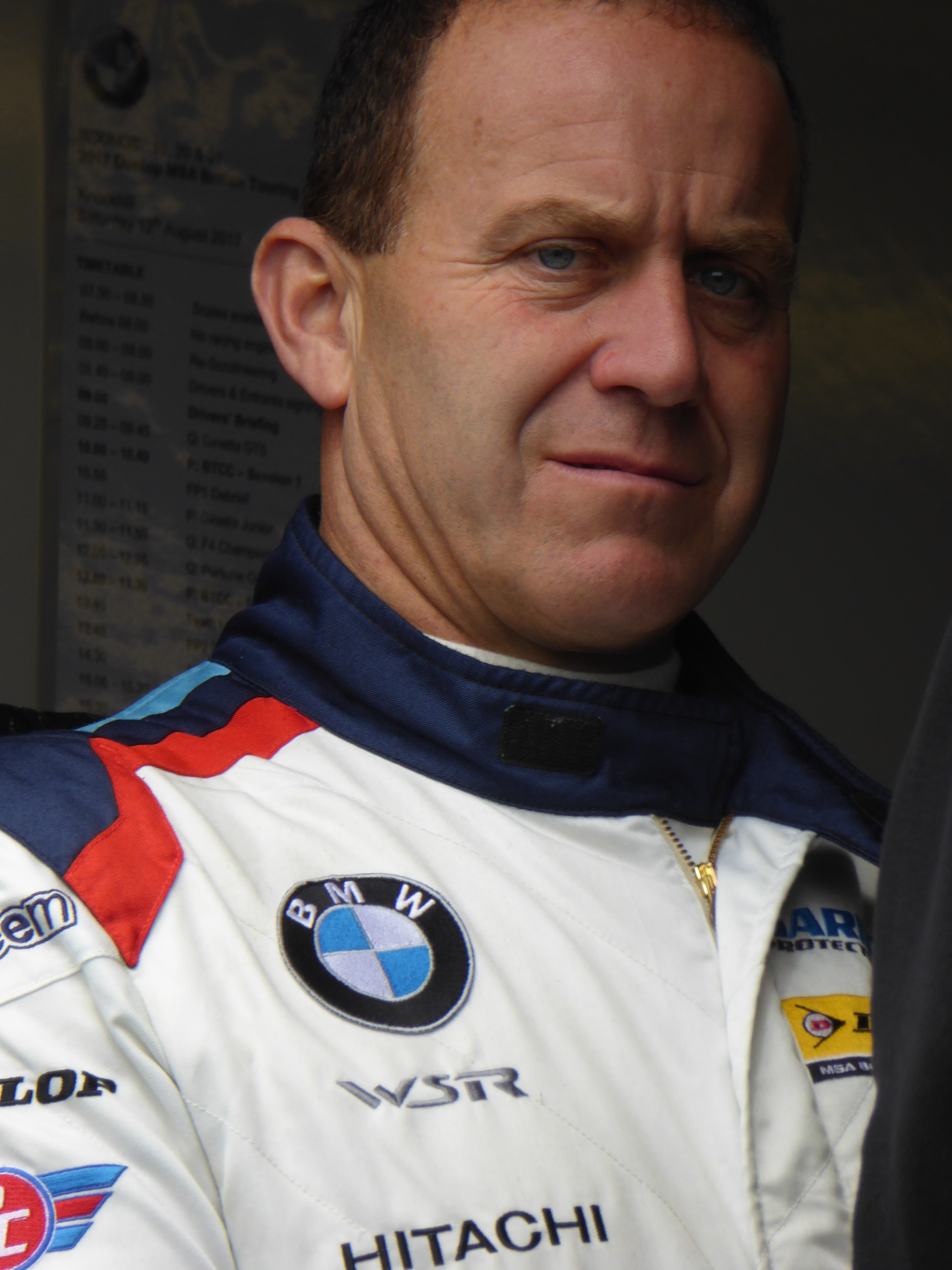
- Collard in 2017
- Nationality: (United Kingdom) British
- Born: Robert John Collard; 1 October 1968 (age 58) Frimley, England, UK
- Relatives: Mick Collard (father); Ricky Collard (son)

British Touring Car Championship career
- Debut season: 2000
- Current team: Sterling Insurance with Power Maxed Racing
- Categorisation: FIA Bronze
- Car number: 9
- Former teams: Motorbase Performance; GR Asia; Collard Racing; Bintcliffe Sport
- Starts: 487
- Wins: 15
- Poles: 0
- Fastest laps: 18
- Best finish: 5th in 2012, 2016, 2017

Previous series
- 2007 2002 1999: Porsche Carrera Cup GB; ETCC; British Formula Ford

Championship titles
- 2020, 2024: British GT Championship

Robert John Collard (born 1 October 1968) is a British auto racing driver from Hampshire, best known for racing in the British Touring Car Championship, winning two races in a West Surrey Racing MG, and claiming the Independent's Cup title in 2003. In 2008, he returned to running the series full-time, driving for the Motorbase Performance team, where he remained for 2009, before returning to West Surrey Racing. Collard also owns his own demolition firm, R Collard Ltd.

== Career ==
For many years, Collard raced hot rods, only switching to circuit racing in his late 20s. He raced Formula Ford for 3 years. However, as most drives in Formula 3 and higher went to younger drivers, he turned his attention to saloon based racing, coming third in the Vauxhall SRi V6 championship.

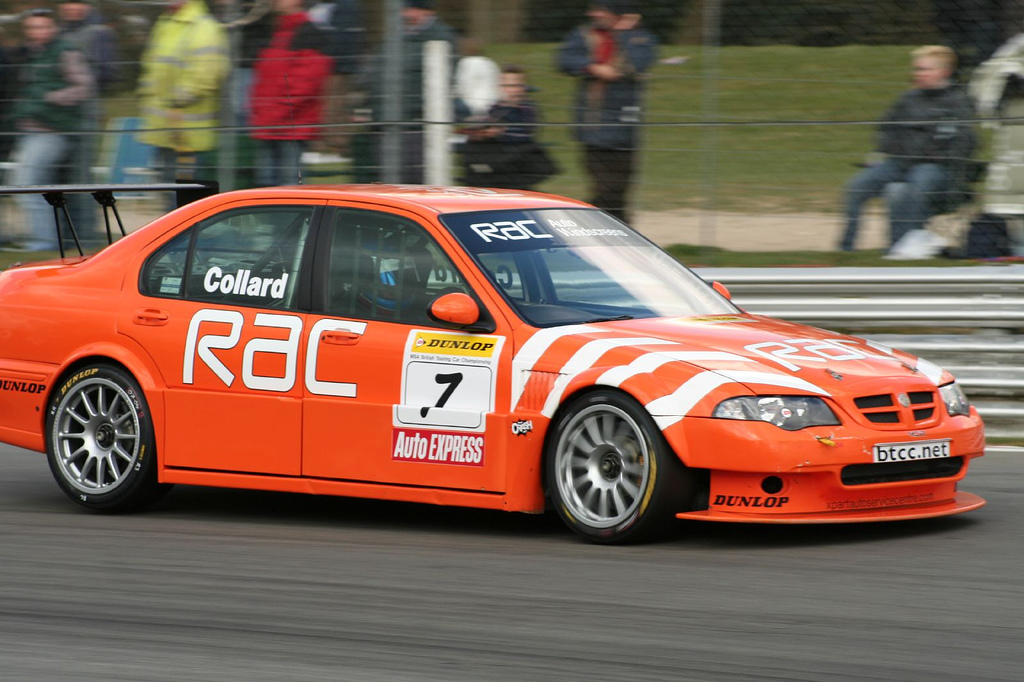
Collard driving the Team RAC-run MG ZS at the Brands Hatch round of the 2006 British Touring Car Championship.

In 2000, the British Touring Car Championship launched Class B, featuring lower-powered but cheaper cars, to fill its relatively thin grid. Rob took up this opportunity, and finished fourth overall in his class. He only raced a partial season in the renamed Production Class in 2001, concentrating on preparing a Renault Clio for a full assault on the Production Class in 2002 with his own Collard Racing team.

The season was a disaster, however. Engine reliability and lasting performance was low, and a victory and a 2nd in the opening meeting proved to be a false dawn, as the small team struggled to get working machinery to the races, and he was outside the championship top 10. He also contested 6 ETCC races in a Nissan Primera for RJN Motorsport that year.

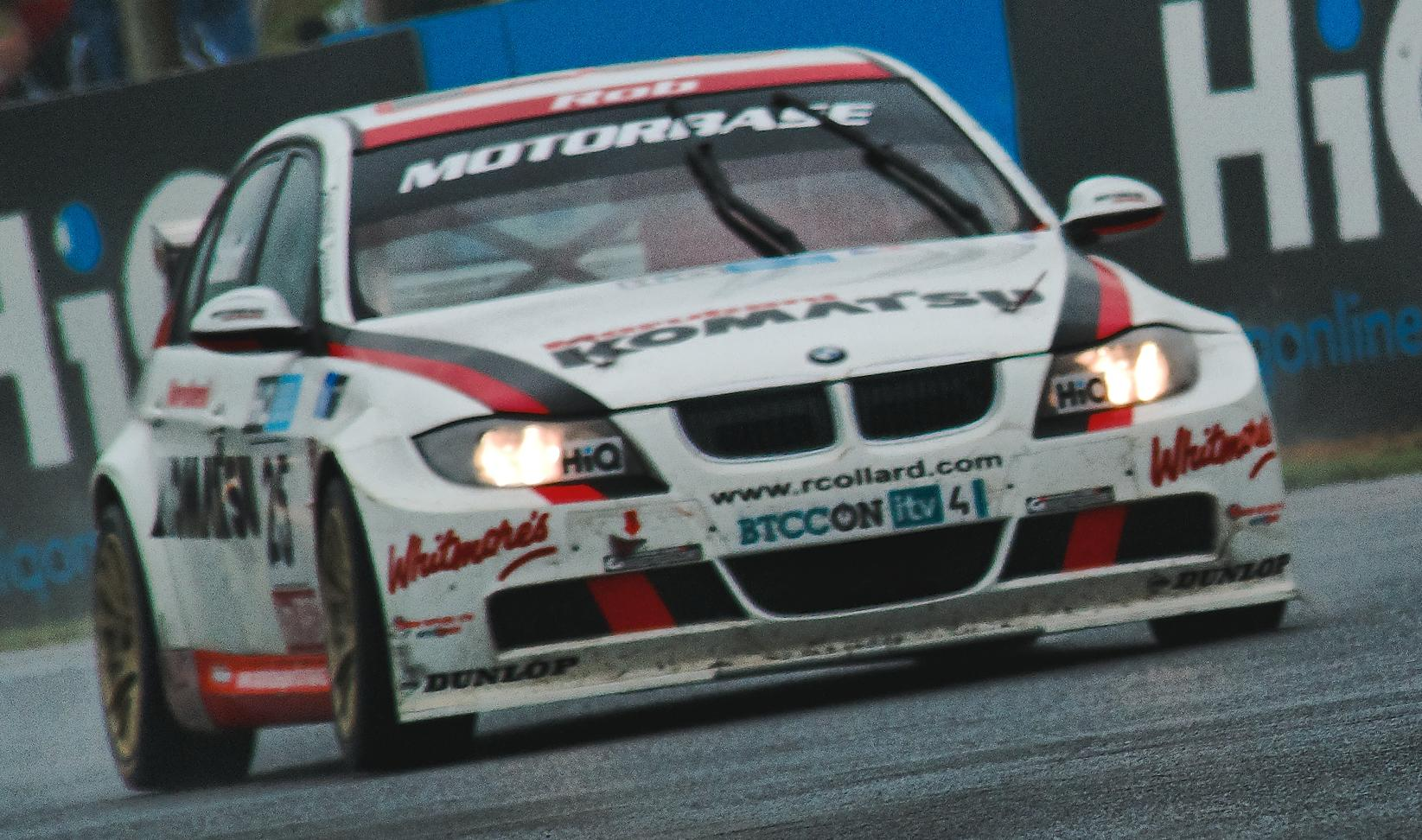
Collard driving at Croft during the 2008 British Touring Car Championship season.

Undeterred, Collard redoubled his efforts for 2003, moving up to the main Touring Class with a Vauxhall Astra. He beat several better-funded teams and drivers to win the Independent's Cup, and finished tenth overall ahead of several 'works' drivers. For 2004, there were less works teams, with MG pulling out and Honda scaling down to only one car. As a result, more competitive cars had independent status. Collard Racing had no realistic hope of matching Anthony Reid's independent MG or Matt Neal's Honda, and finished sixth in the Indy cup and 12th overall.

In 2005, Collard replaced Reid in West Surrey Racing's MG, concentrating purely on racing rather than team ownership. This was his most competitive season to date, with two outright wins and seventh place overall. For 2006, he was joined in the team by Colin Turkington under WSR's new guise "Team RAC". This time, he finished ninth overall with a single podium.

Collard's heavy-handed tactics often come under criticism from fellow drivers and teams, as well as numerous fans of the series. It is believed that Rob's racing licence amassed 9 points in the 2006 season, just three short of a ban from racing. Fellow drivers have often spoken out about his lack of driving standards, one going as far as to describe him as a "rock-ape" at a 2006 meeting.

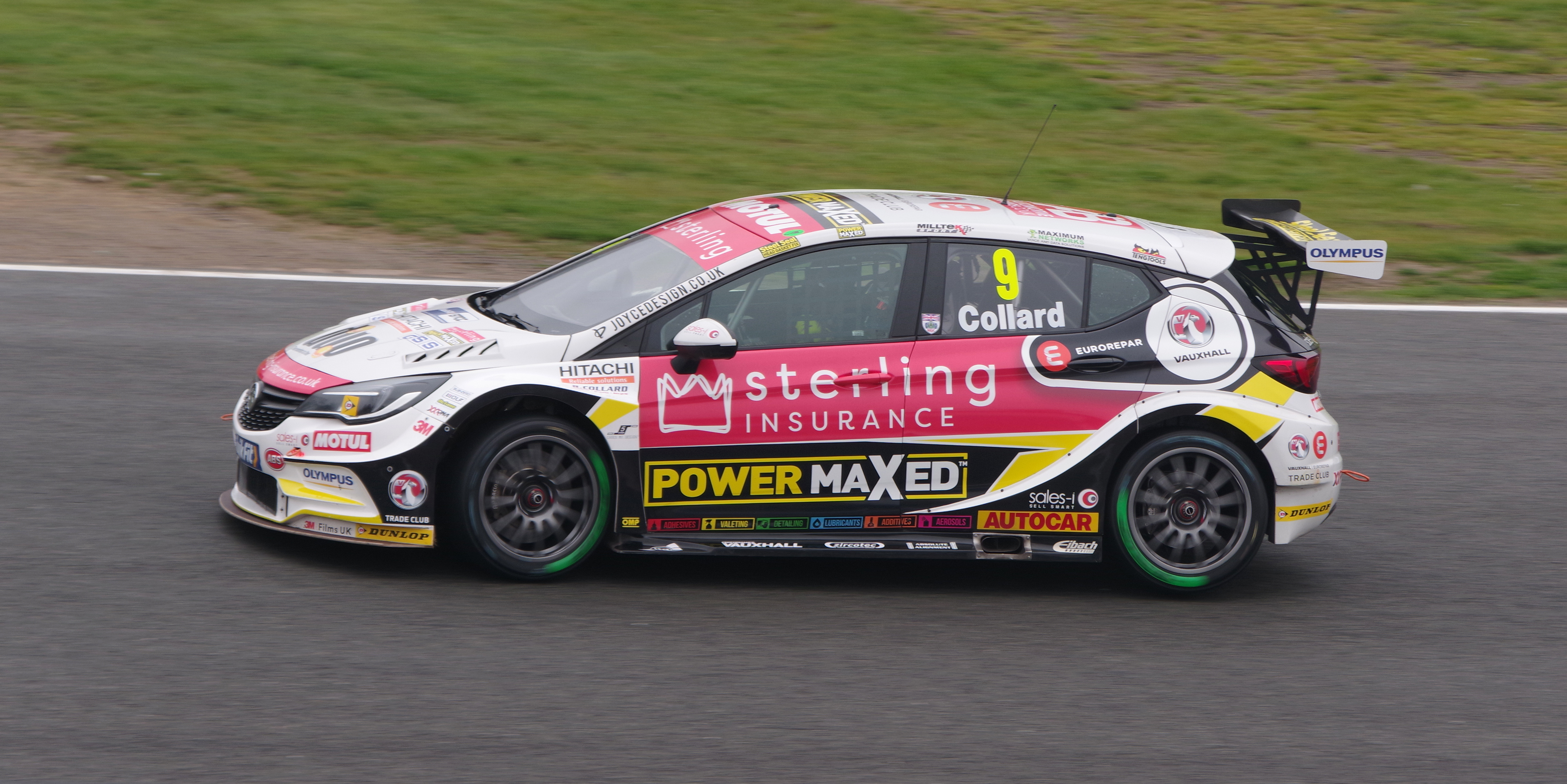
Collard driving for Vauxhall at Brands Hatch during the 2019 British Touring Car Championship season.

In 2007, Collard had no BTCC drive, instead contesting the early rounds of the Porsche Carrera Cup UK, achieving little success in these big difficult-to-control rear-wheel-drive cars. He contested the final round of the BTCC for GR Asia, and returned full-time in 2008 in a Motorbase BMW. At Croft, he scored their best-ever result in fourth, after he and team-mate Steven Kane ran 3rd and 4th for a while. The team had worked on damper settings before the meeting. For 2009, Collard and Jonathan Adam race Motorbase's BMWs. He won two races early on in 2009 at the opening round at Brands Hatch and at Donington Park. He came close to adding a third at Snetterton, before contact with James Nash saw him spin across the track into the path of Stephen Jelley, resulting in a huge collision. Collard complained of abdominal pain and was taken to hospital, while Nash was excluded from the results. He then suffered another big incident at the next round at Knockhill when he and Matt Neal collided after Matt Neal lost control of car. Blighted by incidents and 'DNFs' through the second half of the season, Collard was unable to match the form of the first half of the season but still ended up sixth in the BTCC drivers championship, his best performance in the BTCC so far.

For 2010, Collard returned to West Surrey Racing, replacing reigning champion Colin Turkington who had failed to raise the necessary budget. He finished the year in ninth place.

Collard remained with WSR for 2011 but failed to register a race win. He finished the year eighth in the Drivers Championship. In 2012, he won three races with the team thus finishing fifth overall his best final championship position. In 2013, the team re-signed 2009 champion Colin Turkington. WSR also introduced the new BMW 3 series. Collard achieved a solitary podium and finished up in 13th place overall.

In 2014, Collard again remained with WSR, winning one race and finishing sixth in the drivers championship. He remained with the team for 2015, where he won the first race of the season and finished in tenth place in the championship.

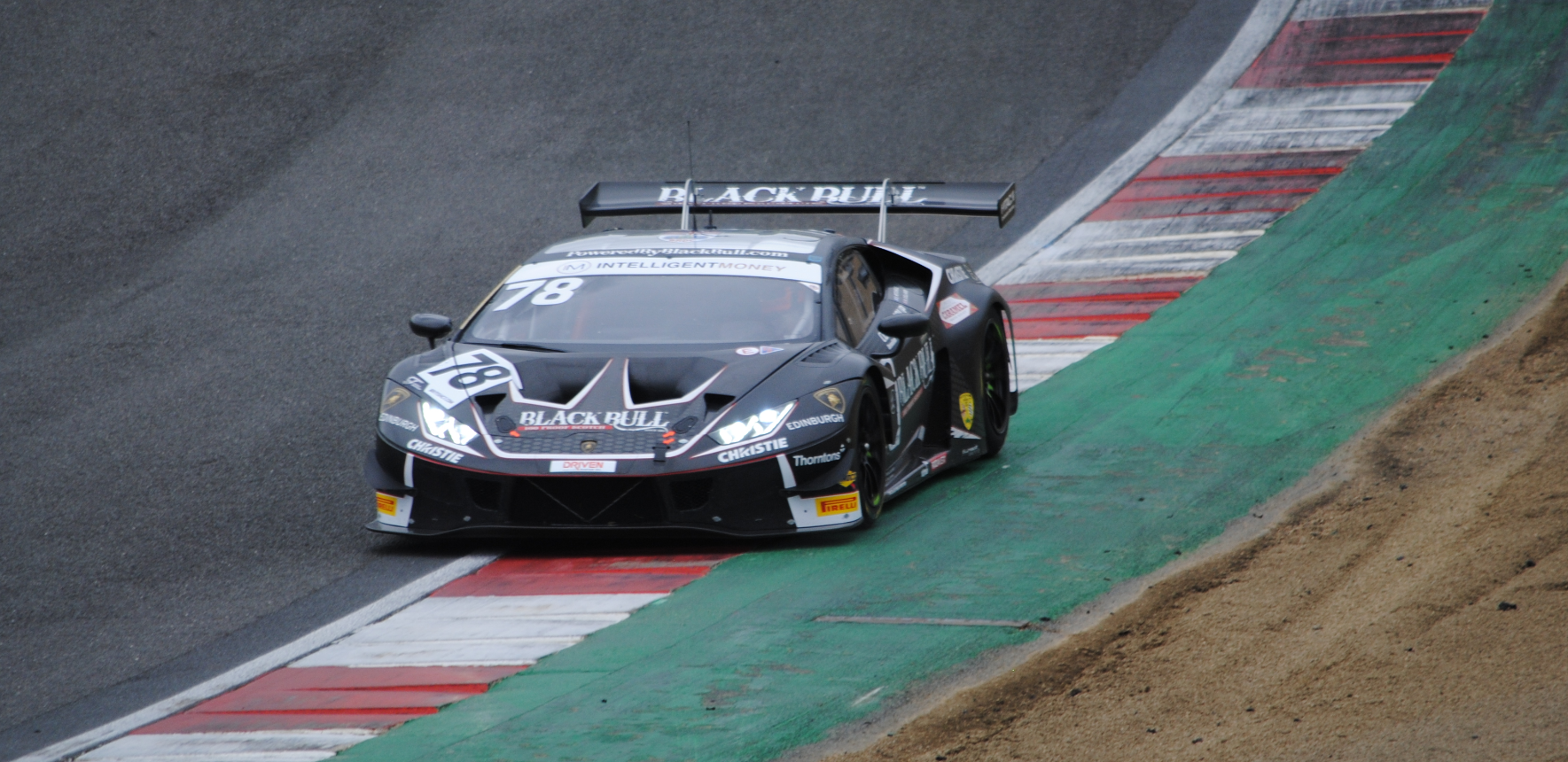
Collard and Mitchell's Lamborghini at Brands Hatch.

For 2020, Collard made his British GT Championship debut for Barwell Motorsport, driving a Lamborghini Huracán GT3 Evo. On 8 November at the season finale the Silverstone 500, Collard and team mate Sandy Mitchell took victory in the race and were confirmed as British GT Champions.

== Personal life ==
Collard's family starred in an episode of Channel 4's Wife Swap, shown during October 2006. He has told ITV's BTCC coverage that his hero was the late Colin McRae, and his ambition is to win the World Touring Car Championship. He is the father of racing driver Ricky Collard.

Collard endorsed the Conservative Party in the 2019 United Kingdom general election.

== Racing record ==
=== Complete British Touring Car Championship results ===
(key) Races in bold indicate pole position (1 point awarded – 2000–2002 all races, 2003–present just in first race, 2000–2003 in class). Races in italics indicate fastest lap (1 point awarded – 2001–present all races, 2000–2003 in class) * signifies that driver led race for at least one lap (1 point given – 2003–present all races).

Year	Team	Car	Class	1	2	3	4	5	6	7	8	9	10	11	12	13	14	15	16	17	18	19	20	21	22	23	24	25	26	27	28	29	30	Pen.	DC	Pts	Class
2000	Bintcliffe Sport	Nissan Primera	B	BRH; 1	BRH; 2	DON; 1 Ret	DON; 2 Ret	THR; 1 DNS	THR; 2 DNS	KNO; 1	KNO; 2	OUL; 1 ovr:12 cls:3	OUL; 2 ovr:11 cls:2	SIL; 1 ovr:13 cls:4	SIL; 2 Ret	CRO; 1 ovr:11 cls:2	CRO; 2 ovr:8 cls:3	SNE; 1 Ret	SNE; 2 ovr:9 cls:1	DON; 1 ovr:14 cls:4	DON; 2 Ret	BRH; 1 Ret	BRH; 2 ovr:12 cls:2	OUL; 1 Ret	OUL; 2 DNS	SIL; 1 Ret	SIL; 2 Ret								N/A	81	4th
2001	Collard Racing	Renault Clio 172	P	BRH; 1; 6†	BRH; 2 DNS	THR; 1 Ret	THR; 2 NC	OUL; 1 Ret	OUL; 2 DNS	SIL; 1 ovr:12 cls:6	SIL; 2 Ret	MON; 1 Ret	MON; 2 DNS	DON; 1 ovr:11 cls:4	DON; 2 Ret	KNO; 1 ovr:10 cls:5	KNO; 2 ovr:8 cls:4	SNE; 1 ovr:5 cls:3	SNE; 2 Ret	CRO; 1	CRO; 2	OUL; 1 DNS	OUL; 2 DNS	SIL; 1 ovr:11 cls:6	SIL; 2 Ret	DON; 1 WD	DON; 2 WD	BRH; 1 ovr:17 cls:9	BRH; 2 Ret					**-5**	N/A	46	13th
2002	Collard Racing	Renault Clio 172	P	BRH; 1 ovr:7 cls:2	BRH; 2 ovr:9* cls:1	OUL; 1 WD	OUL; 2 WD	THR; 1 DNS	THR; 2 DNS	SIL; 1 ovr:14 cls:2	SIL; 2 Ret	MON; 1	MON; 2	CRO; 1 DNS	CRO; 2 DNS	SNE; 1	SNE; 2	KNO; 1	KNO; 2	BRH; 1	BRH; 2	DON; 1	DON; 2											**-5**	N/A	34	12th
2003	Collard Racing	Vauxhall Astra Coupé	T	MON; 1 ovr:6 cls:6	MON; 2 ovr:7 cls:7	BRH; 1 ovr:13 cls:13	BRH; 2 Ret	THR; 1 Ret	THR; 2 DNS	SIL; 1 Ret	SIL; 2 ovr:9 cls:9	ROC; 1 ovr:7 cls:7	ROC; 2 ovr:5 cls:5	CRO; 1 Ret	CRO; 2 ovr:8 cls:8	SNE; 1 ovr:8 cls:8	SNE; 2 ovr:6 cls:6	BRH; 1 Ret	BRH; 2 Ret	DON; 1 ovr:9* cls:9	DON; 2 ovr:16 cls:16	OUL; 1 ovr:8 cls:8	OUL; 2 ovr:7 cls:7												10th	42	
2004	Collard Racing	Vauxhall Astra Coupé		THR; 1; 11	THR; 2; 5	THR; 3; 8	BRH; 1; 10	**BRH**; **2**; 15	BRH; 3; 15	SIL; 1 Ret	SIL; 2; 13	SIL; 3 DNS	OUL; 1; 5	OUL; 2 Ret	OUL; 3; 4	MON; 1; 13	MON; 2; 11	MON; 3 Ret	CRO; 1; 15	CRO; 2 Ret	CRO; 3; 9	KNO; 1; 8	KNO; 2; 11	KNO; 3 Ret	BRH; 1; 15	BRH; 2 Ret	BRH; 3; 9	SNE; 1; 7	SNE; 2; 9	SNE; 3; 11	DON; 1; 13	DON; 2; 8	DON; 3; 7		12th	44	
2005	West Surrey Racing	MG ZS		DON; 1; 4	DON; 2; 2	DON; 3; 4	THR; 1; 5	THR; 2; 11	THR; 3 Ret	BRH; 1; 6	BRH; 2; 6	BRH; 3 Ret	OUL; 1; 8	OUL; 2; 4	OUL; 3; 4*	CRO; 1; 7	CRO; 2; 4	CRO; 3; 5	MON; 1; 5	MON; 2; 4	MON; 3; 3	SNE; 1; 5	SNE; 2; 5	SNE; 3; 12	KNO; 1; 9	KNO; 2; 9	KNO; 3; 1*	SIL; 1; 10	SIL; 2; 10	**SIL**; **3**; 2*	BRH; 1 Ret	BRH; 2; 9	BRH; 3; 1*		7th	173	
2006	Team RAC	MG ZS		BRH; 1; 7	BRH; 2; 6	BRH; 3 DSQ	MON; 1 Ret	MON; 2; 10	MON; 3 Ret	OUL; 1; 6	OUL; 2; 5	OUL; 3; 4	THR; 1; 5	THR; 2; 3	THR; 3; 6	CRO; 1; 5	CRO; 2 Ret	CRO; 3; 10	DON; 1; 9	DON; 2; 13	DON; 3 Ret	SNE; 1; 11	SNE; 2; 5	SNE; 3 Ret	KNO; 1 Ret	KNO; 2 Ret	KNO; 3; 7	BRH; 1; 5	BRH; 2; 7	BRH; 3; 6	SIL; 1; 10	SIL; 2; 5	SIL; 3; 7		9th	97	
2007	GR Asia	SEAT León		BRH; 1	BRH; 2	BRH; 3	ROC; 1	ROC; 2	ROC; 3	THR; 1	THR; 2	THR; 3	CRO; 1	CRO; 2	CRO; 3	OUL; 1	OUL; 2	OUL; 3	DON; 1	DON; 2	DON; 3	SNE; 1	SNE; 2	SNE; 3	BRH; 1	BRH; 2	BRH; 3	KNO; 1	KNO; 2	KNO; 3	THR; 1; 11	THR; 2 Ret	THR; 3; 10		27th	1	
2008	Motorbase Performance	BMW 320si		BRH; 1; 12	BRH; 2 Ret	BRH; 3; 11	ROC; 1; 13	ROC; 2; 12	ROC; 3; 8	DON; 1 Ret	DON; 2 DNS	DON; 3 Ret	THR; 1; 14	THR; 2; 14	THR; 3; 11	CRO; 1; 5	CRO; 2; 4	CRO; 3 Ret*	SNE; 1; 9	SNE; 2; 4	SNE; 3; 9	OUL; 1; 10	OUL; 2 Ret	OUL; 3; 8	KNO; 1; 7	KNO; 2; 6	KNO; 3; 2	SIL; 1; 16	SIL; 2; 9	SIL; 3; 7	BRH; 1; 3	BRH; 2; 4	BRH; 3; 6		12th	84	
2009	Airwaves BMW	BMW 320si		BRH; 1; 4*	BRH; 2; 1*	BRH; 3; 8	THR; 1; 17	THR; 2; 5	THR; 3; 5	DON; 1; 4	DON; 2; 9	DON; 3; 1*	OUL; 1; 9	OUL; 2 DNS	OUL; 3; 4	CRO; 1; 4	CRO; 2; 4	CRO; 3; 7	SNE; 1 Ret	SNE; 2; 7	SNE; 3 Ret*	KNO; 1 Ret	KNO; 2; 12	KNO; 3 Ret	SIL; 1; 6*	SIL; 2; 9	**SIL**; **3**; 2*	ROC; 1; 4	ROC; 2 Ret	ROC; 3 Ret	BRH; 1; 6	BRH; 2; 4	BRH; 3 Ret		6th	145	
2010	WSR	BMW 320si		THR; 1 Ret	THR; 2; 9	**THR**; **3** Ret*	ROC; 1; 10	ROC; 2; 2	ROC; 3; 6	BRH; 1; 4	BRH; 2; 12	BRH; 3; 4	OUL; 1; 3	OUL; 2; 15	OUL; 3; 8	CRO; 1; 2	CRO; 2; 8	CRO; 3; 17	SNE; 1; 10	SNE; 2; 7	SNE; 3; 2	SIL; 1; 6	SIL; 2; 2	SIL; 3; 12	KNO; 1 Ret	KNO; 2 Ret	KNO; 3; 6	DON; 1; 16	DON; 2; 7	DON; 3; 2	BRH; 1; 5	BRH; 2; 3	BRH; 3; 6		8th	144	
2011	WSR	BMW 320si		BRH; 1; 17	BRH; 2; 9	BRH; 3; 7	DON; 1; 6	DON; 2; 5	DON; 3 Ret	THR; 1; 12	THR; 2; 14	THR; 3; 13	OUL; 1; 5	OUL; 2; 3	OUL; 3; 14	CRO; 1; 3	CRO; 2; 2	CRO; 3; 3	SNE; 1; 23	SNE; 2; 10	SNE; 3; 12	KNO; 1; 5	KNO; 2; 5	KNO; 3; 2	ROC; 1 Ret	ROC; 2; 10	**ROC**; **3**; 3	BRH; 1; 8	BRH; 2; 22	BRH; 3 Ret	SIL; 1; 8	SIL; 2; 23	SIL; 3; 23		8th	108	
2012	eBay Motors	BMW 320si		BRH; 1; 1*	**BRH**; **2**; 6*	BRH; 3; 6*	DON; 1; 10*	DON; 2; 8	DON; 3; 4	THR; 1; 4	THR; 2; 7	THR; 3; 7	OUL; 1; 3*	OUL; 2; 14*	OUL; 3; 6	CRO; 1; 2	CRO; 2; 5	CRO; 3; 5	SNE; 1 Ret	SNE; 2 NC	SNE; 3; 9	KNO; 1; 1*	**KNO**; **2**; 1*	KNO; 3; 9	ROC; 1; 5	ROC; 2; 11	ROC; 3; 13	SIL; 1; 4	SIL; 2; 2*	SIL; 3; 3	BRH; 1; 6	BRH; 2 Ret	BRH; 3; 19		5th	303	
2013	eBay Motors	BMW 125i M Sport		BRH; 1 Ret	BRH; 2 Ret	BRH; 3 Ret	DON; 1; 15	DON; 2; 12	DON; 3; 12	THR; 1; 13	THR; 2; 13	THR; 3; 15	OUL; 1; 10	OUL; 2 NC	OUL; 3; 11	CRO; 1; 9	CRO; 2; 6	CRO; 3; 14	SNE; 1; 10	SNE; 2 Ret	SNE; 3; 9	KNO; 1; 6	KNO; 2; 4	KNO; 3; 3	ROC; 1; 7	ROC; 2 Ret	ROC; 3 Ret	SIL; 1; 5	SIL; 2 Ret	SIL; 3; 12	BRH; 1; 7	BRH; 2; 14	BRH; 3; 8		13th	140	
2014	eBay Motors	BMW 125i M Sport		BRH; 1; 6	BRH; 2; 6	**BRH**; **3**; 4*	DON; 1; 4	DON; 2 Ret	DON; 3; 7	THR; 1; 5	THR; 2; 3	THR; 3; 10	OUL; 1; 2	OUL; 2; 3	OUL; 3; 11	CRO; 1; 4	CRO; 2; 3	CRO; 3; 2	SNE; 1; 9	SNE; 2; 18	SNE; 3; 6	KNO; 1; 12	KNO; 2; 5	KNO; 3; 1*	ROC; 1; 11	ROC; 2; 9	ROC; 3; 6	SIL; 1; 7	SIL; 2 Ret	SIL; 3 DNS	BRH; 1; 6	BRH; 2; 3*	BRH; 3 Ret	**-3**	6th	275	
2015	Team JCT600 with GardX	BMW 125i M Sport		BRH; 1; 1*	BRH; 2; 16	BRH; 3 Ret	DON; 1; 8	DON; 2; 6	DON; 3; 4*	THR; 1; 13	THR; 2; 2*	THR; 3; 14	OUL; 1; 13	OUL; 2 Ret	OUL; 3; 14	CRO; 1; 3	CRO; 2; 6	**CRO**; **3**; 1*	SNE; 1 Ret	SNE; 2 NC	SNE; 3; 10	KNO; 1; 1*	KNO; 2; 2	KNO; 3 Ret	ROC; 1; 18	ROC; 2; 28	ROC; 3 DNS	SIL; 1; 7	SIL; 2; 9	SIL; 3; 2*	BRH; 1; 10	BRH; 2; 10	BRH; 3; 7		10th	226	
2016	Team JCT600 with GardX	BMW 125i M Sport		BRH; 1; 6	BRH; 2; 16	BRH; 3; 6	DON; 1; 6	DON; 2; 1*	DON; 3; 4	THR; 1; 6	THR; 2; 2	THR; 3; 6	OUL; 1; 23	OUL; 2; 25	OUL; 3; 6	CRO; 1; 7	CRO; 2; 1*	CRO; 3; 4	SNE; 1; 16	SNE; 2; 4	SNE; 3; 2*	KNO; 1; 17	KNO; 2; 5	KNO; 3 Ret	ROC; 1; 14	ROC; 2; 3	ROC; 3; 6	SIL; 1; 7	SIL; 2; 7	SIL; 3; 3*	BRH; 1; 12	BRH; 2; 10	BRH; 3; 9		5th	278	
2017	Team BMW	BMW 125i M Sport		BRH; 1; 7	BRH; 2; 2	BRH; 3; 6	DON; 1; 6	DON; 2; 2	DON; 3; 12	THR; 1; 10	THR; 2; 1*	THR; 3; 7	OUL; 1; 5	OUL; 2; 2	OUL; 3; 6	CRO; 1; 4	CRO; 2; 3	CRO; 3; 8	SNE; 1; 9	SNE; 2; 3	SNE; 3; 2	KNO; 1; 4	KNO; 2; 4	KNO; 3; 11	ROC; 1; 17	ROC; 2; 8	ROC; 3 Ret	SIL; 1 Ret	SIL; 2 DNS	SIL; 3 DNS	BRH; 1 WD	BRH; 2 WD	BRH; 3 WD		5th	256	
2018	Team BMW	BMW 125i M Sport		BRH; 1; 15	BRH; 2; 26	BRH; 3 Ret	DON; 1; 11	DON; 2; 13	DON; 3; 4	THR; 1; 11	THR; 2; 16	THR; 3; 10	OUL; 1; 9	OUL; 2; 6	OUL; 3; 1*	CRO; 1; 6	CRO; 2; 28	CRO; 3; 11	SNE; 1 Ret	SNE; 2 Ret	SNE; 3 DNS	ROC; 1	ROC; 2	ROC; 3	KNO; 1	KNO; 2	KNO; 3	SIL; 1	SIL; 2	SIL; 3	BRH; 1	BRH; 2	BRH; 3		19th	86	
2019	Sterling Insurance with Power Maxed Racing	Vauxhall Astra		BRH; 1; 21	BRH; 2; 22	BRH; 3 Ret	DON; 1; 10	DON; 2; 7	DON; 3; 2	THR; 1; 8	THR; 2; 9	THR; 3; 14	CRO; 1 Ret	CRO; 2; 19	CRO; 3; 26	OUL; 1; 15	OUL; 2; 22	OUL; 3; 23	SNE; 1; 7	SNE; 2; 14	SNE; 3; 4	THR; 1; 6	THR; 2; 6	THR; 3; 2*	KNO; 1 NC	KNO; 2; 17	KNO; 3; 16	SIL; 1; 12	SIL; 2 NC	SIL; 3; 21	BRH; 1; 15	BRH; 2; 17	BRH; 3; 18		16th	118	

† Event with 2 races staged for the different classes.

=== Complete European Touring Car Championship results ===
(key)

Year	Team	Car	1	2	3	4	5	6	7	8	9	10	11	12	13	14	15	16	17	18	19	20	Pos	Pts
2002	RJN Motorsport	Nissan Primera	MAG; 1	MAG; 2	SIL; 1	SIL; 2	BRN; 1	BRN; 2	JAR; 1	JAR; 2	AND; 1	AND; 2	OSC; 1	OSC; 2	SPA; 1	SPA; 2	PER; 1 Ret	PER; 2 DNS	DON; 1; 14	DON; 2; 12	EST; 1; 10	EST; 2; 12	27th	0

=== Complete British GT Championship results ===
(key) (Races in bold indicate pole position in class) (Races in italics indicate fastest lap in class)

Year	Team	Car	Class	1	2	3	4	5	6	7	8	9	DC	Points
2020	Barwell Motorsport	Lamborghini Huracán GT3	GT3	OUL; 1; 4	OUL; 2; 2	DON; 1; 5	DON; 2; 6	BRH; 1; 1	DON; 1; 6	SNE; 1; 2	**SNE**; **2**; 5	**SIL**; **1**; 1	1st	168
2024	Black Bull-Barwell Motorsport	Lamborghini Huracán GT3 Evo 2	GT3	**OUL**; **1**; 1	OUL; 2; 5	SIL; 1; 5	DON; 1; 5	SPA; 1; 3	**SNE**; **1**; 2	SNE; 2; 2	**DON**; **1**; 1	BRH; 1; 5	1st	182
2025	Barwell Motorsport	Lamborghini Huracán GT3 Evo 2	GT3	DON; 1	SIL; 1; 6	**OUL**; **1**; 1	OUL; 2; 10	SPA; 1; 3	SNE; 1; 8	SNE; 2; 3	BRH; 1; 3	**DON**; **1**; 2	5th	133
2026	Barwell Motorsport	Lamborghini Huracán GT3 Evo 2	GT3	SIL; 1 Ret	OUL; 1; 1	OUL; 2; 4	SPA; 1; 4	SNE; 1; 2	SNE; 2; 4	DON; 1; 1	BRH; 1; 10		3rd	125.5

=== Complete GT World Challenge Europe Sprint Cup results ===
(key) (Races in bold indicate pole position) (Races in italics indicate fastest lap)

Year	Team	Car	Class	1	2	3	4	5	6	7	8	9	10	Pos.	Points
2024	Barwell Motorsport	Lamborghini Huracán GT3 Evo 2	Bronze	BRH; 1	BRH; 2	MIS; 1; 19	MIS; 2; 24	HOC; 1; 19	HOC; 2; 15	MAG; 1; 18	MAG; 2; 25	CAT; 1; 22	CAT; 2; 21	2nd	67.5

Sporting positions
Preceded by Jonathan Adam; Graham Davidson	British GT Championship; Champion; 2020; With: Sandy Mitchell	Succeeded by Dennis Lind; Leo Machitski
Preceded by Bradley Ellis; Oliver Wilkinson	British GT Championship; Silver Champion; 2020; With: Sandy Mitchell	Succeeded by Lewis Proctor; Stewart Proctor (Silver-Am)
Preceded by Dan Harper; Darren Leung	British GT Championship; Champion; 2024; With: Ricky Collard	Succeeded by Kiern Jewiss; Charles Dawson
Preceded by Dan Harper; Darren Leung	British GT Championship; Pro-Am Champion; 2024; With: Ricky Collard	Succeeded by Kiern Jewiss; Charles Dawson
