= Fiona Leggate =

British racing driver (born 1980)

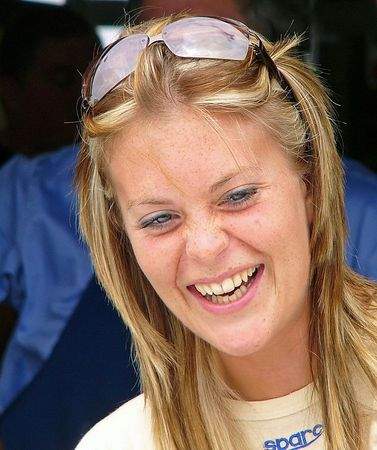
- Leggate at Croft in 2005
- Nationality: (United Kingdom) British
- Born: 28 May 1980 (age 46)

Previous series
- 2006: British Touring Car Championship

Fiona Leggate (born 28 May 1980) is a British auto racing driver.

== Early career ==
Leggate had been interested in motorsport since her childhood, influenced by her father Malcolm Leggate who had a 19-year career in saloon car racing.

After competing in showjumping and dressage events (once breaking both her wrists at once when she was ten), Leggate switched her attention from horseriding to horsepower, entering and winning a competition to drive with ex-British Rally Champion Gwyndaf Evans.

This led to Leggate spending 2003 and 2004 contesting various championships including Britcar and the MG XPower trophy, and in July 2004, she set a world record for the most races contested in one day.

== British Touring Car Championship (BTCC) ==
Leggate entered the BTCC in 2005, joining halfway through the season in a Vauxhall Astra Coupé acquired from the championship-winning works team 888, but converted to run on bioethanol fuel and run by the Leamington Spa based Tech-Speed team. She scored 12 points including a fifth place at Silverstone, gaining much publicity for the environmentally-friendly fuel.

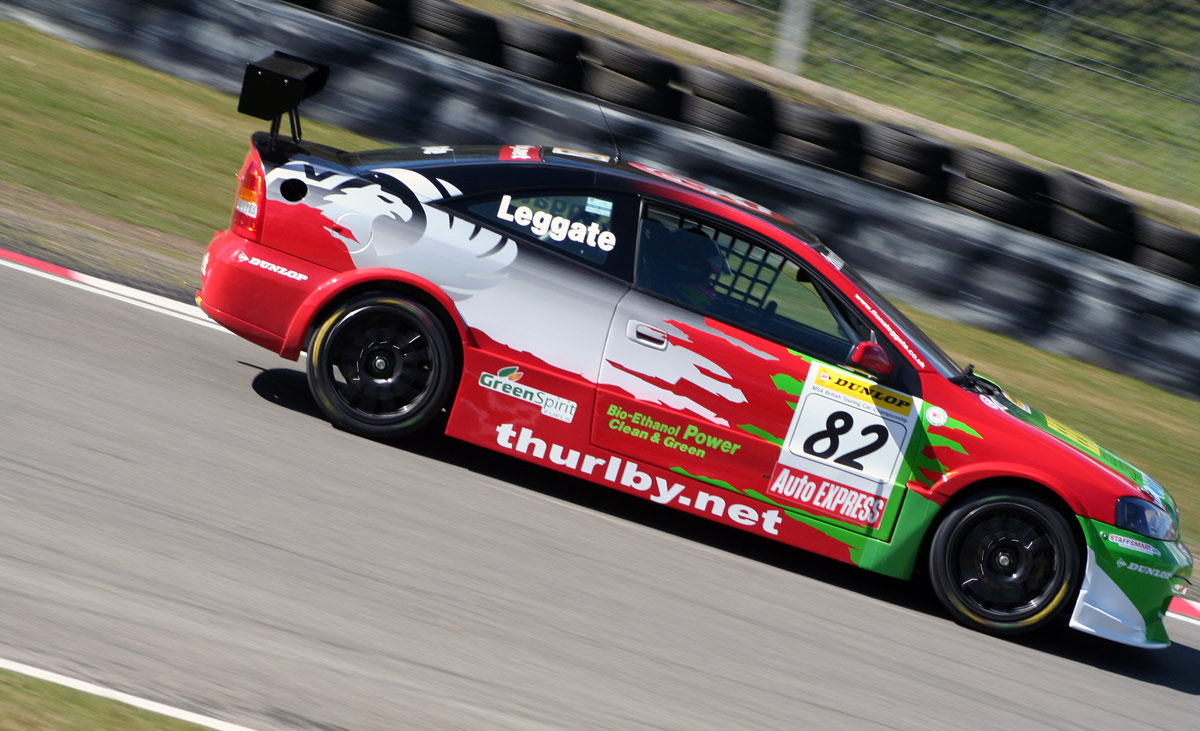
Leggate driving the bio-ethanol-fuelled Vauxhall Astra at the Brands Hatch round of the 2006 British Touring Car Championship.

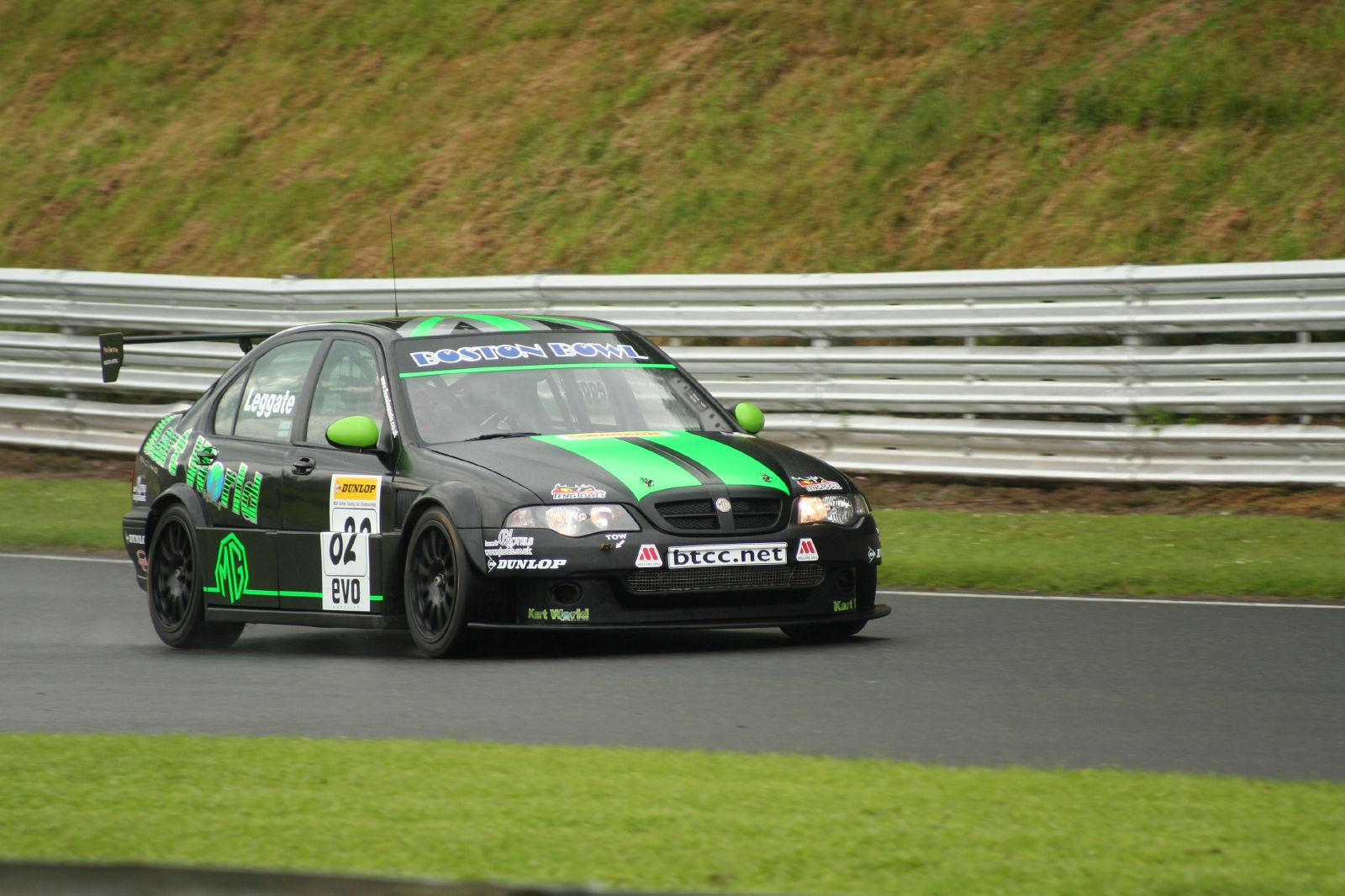
Leggate driving a Kartworld Racing-run MG ZS at the Oulton Park round of the 2007 British Touring Car Championship.

For 2006, Leggate once again raced in the BTCC in the same car running on bio-ethanol, with new sponsorship from Vauxhall dealer Thurlby Motors as well as continuing support from the Energy Efficient Motorsport (EEMS) scheme. Her best results were a trio of tenth places. She missed the races at round 6 due to a cracked engine cylinder. After also missing round 8, she withdrew from the series, her replacement being Paul O'Neill for the remaining two rounds of the series.

In 2007, Leggate again raced in the BTCC with the Kartworld team using an ex-WSR MG ZS fuelled once again with bio-ethanol. She also raced in the EERC Production S1 championship with the same MG ZR that she used in 2006.

== Other racing ==
In 2006, Leggate competed in non-clashing Britcar Production S1 races in an MG ZR. She was partnered once by MG racer Paul White in March at Silverstone and then Rob Oldaker in June at Brands Hatch. Leggate and Oldaker were then joined by MG Trophy racer Ben Jacques and Italian BMW racer Umberto Nacamuli for the Silverstone 24-hour race. The car retired with engine failure with only just over an hour to go. She also competed in the Mini Challenge, driving at Thruxton and Spa, although she missed race two there due to failure of the engine electronics.

As well as this, Leggate also raced another MG ZR in two endurance races at the MGCC Silverstone meeting in June. She was partnered in Race 1 by Regular driver Rob Oldaker and by Mark Stacey for the second race. The car retired from the second race with head gasket failure.

In 2007, Leggate entered the PS1 Championship, where she won her class in the first four races, as well as having the class pole at the two meetings and fastest lap.

== Personal life ==
Leggate was previously married to Danny Watts. They have one son.

== Racing record ==
=== Complete British Touring Car Championship results ===
(key) (Races in bold indicate pole position – 1 point awarded just in first race) (Races in italics indicate fastest lap – 1 point awarded all races) (* signifies that driver lead race for at least one lap – 1 point awarded all races)

Year	Team	Car	1	2	3	4	5	6	7	8	9	10	11	12	13	14	15	16	17	18	19	20	21	22	23	24	25	26	27	28	29	30	DC	Pts
2005	Tech-Speed Motorsport	Vauxhall Astra Coupé	DON; 1	DON; 2	DON; 3	THR; 1	THR; 2	THR; 3	BRH; 1	BRH; 2	BRH; 3	OUL; 1	OUL; 2	OUL; 3	CRO; 1; 11	CRO; 2; 14	CRO; 3; 10	MON; 1; 13	MON; 2; 13	MON; 3; 9	SNE; 1; 11	SNE; 2; 13	SNE; 3 DNS	KNO; 1; 14	KNO; 2; 11	KNO; 3; 9	SIL; 1; 13	SIL; 2; 5	SIL; 3; 13	BRH; 1; 13	BRH; 2 Ret	BRH; 3; 10	**16th**	**12**
2006	Thurlby Motors with Tech-Speed	Vauxhall Astra Coupé	BRH; 1 Ret	BRH; 2; 12	BRH; 3; 10	MON; 1; 14	MON; 2 Ret	MON; 3 DNS	OUL; 1; 15	OUL; 2; 14	OUL; 3; 11	THR; 1; 10	THR; 2; 13	THR; 3; 10	CRO; 1 Ret	CRO; 2; 16	CRO; 3; 14	DON; 1 DNS	DON; 2 DNS	DON; 3 DNS	SNE; 1; 13	SNE; 2; 12	SNE; 3 Ret	KNO; 1	KNO; 2	KNO; 3	BRH; 1	BRH; 2	BRH; 3	SIL; 1	SIL; 2	SIL; 3	**21st**	**3**
2007	Kartworld Racing	MG ZS	BRH; 1 Ret	BRH; 2 DNS	BRH; 3; 14	ROC; 1 Ret	ROC; 2 DNS	ROC; 3 Ret	THR; 1; 14	THR; 2; 12	THR; 3 Ret	CRO; 1; 15	CRO; 2 Ret	CRO; 3; 13	OUL; 1; 16	OUL; 2; 15	OUL; 3 Ret	DON; 1 Ret	DON; 2; 19	DON; 3; 18	SNE; 1; 17	SNE; 2 Ret	SNE; 3 DNS	BRH; 1 Ret	BRH; 2 DNS	BRH; 3 Ret	KNO; 1 Ret	KNO; 2; 15	KNO; 3; 14	THR; 1; 19	THR; 2 DNS	THR; 3; 18	**31st**	**0**

=== Britcar 24 Hour results ===
Year	Team	Co-Drivers	Car	Car No.	Class	Laps	Pos.	Class Pos.	Ref
2007	(United Kingdom) Pete Daniels Motorsport	(United Kingdom) Peter Daniels (United Kingdom) Malcolm Edeson (United Kingdom) Michael Hartley	Honda Civic Type R	68	3	470	38th	4th	
