= Jason Hughes (auto racing) =

British racing driver (born 1969)

- Nationality: (United Kingdom) British

Previous series
- 2003-2008: British Touring Car Championship

Jason Hughes (born 27 July 1969) is the owner-driver of the Kartworld Racing (also known as KWR) auto racing team, which has competed in the British Touring Car Championship from 2003 to 2008. In 1999, Hughes was BRSCC Fiesta Champion, and first entered the BTCC with a Nissan Primera in the Production Class.

Moving up into the main Touring Class for 2004 he raced in an MG ZS, finishing 17th. He did a partial season in 2005 (scoring enough points to come 13th overall in a smaller field), but returned to running the full schedule in 2006. For the second half of the season Hughes converted his MG to run on bioethanol instead of regular petrol, joining Fiona Leggate in using the alternative fuel. On 3 September 2006, Hughes took his best ever result of fourth, at Knockhill in Scotland.

Hughes continued to drive his bio-ethanol powered MG in 2007, with Leggate in a second car. The team were beset with problems but Hughes scored Overall points several times, with both cars scoring in the independents championship. In 2008, Hughes agreed to purchase a Honda Integra from veteran racer David Pinkney, but a sponsor failed to pay up, forcing him to continue with the MG, which received an engine upgrade midseason. He entered again in 2009, but missed the first two rounds while recovering from a knee operation. He later missed the rest of the season. Hughes again did not participate in the 2010 season.

Hughes currently participates in Classic Touring Car racing.

== Racing record ==
=== Complete British Touring Car Championship results ===
(key) (Races in bold indicate pole position – 1 point awarded in first race) (Races in italics indicate fastest lap – 1 point awarded all races) (* signifies that driver lead race for at least one lap – 1 point awarded all races)

Year	Team	Car	Class	1	2	3	4	5	6	7	8	9	10	11	12	13	14	15	16	17	18	19	20	21	22	23	24	25	26	27	28	29	30	Pos	Pts	Class
2003	Kartworld Racing	Nissan Primera	P	MON; 1	MON; 2	BRH; 1	BRH; 2	THR; 1	THR; 2	SIL; 1	SIL; 2	ROC; 1	ROC; 2	CRO; 1 Ret	CRO; 2 ovr:18 cls:5	SNE; 1 Ret	SNE; 2 Ret	BRH; 1 Ret	BRH; 2 DNS	DON; 1 WD	DON; 2 WD	OUL; 1 DNS	OUL; 2 DNS											N/A	6	11th
2004	Kartworld Racing	MG ZS		THR; 1 Ret	THR; 2; 12	THR; 3 Ret	BRH; 1; 14	BRH; 2; 12	BRH; 3; 12	SIL; 1 Ret	SIL; 2; 19	SIL; 3; 17	OUL; 1; 15	OUL; 2; 16	OUL; 3; 12	MON; 1; 14	MON; 2; 13	MON; 3; 7	CRO; 1; 12	CRO; 2 Ret	CRO; 3 Ret	KNO; 1; 11	KNO; 2; 10	KNO; 3; 12	BRH; 1; 14	BRH; 2; 11	BRH; 3 Ret	SNE; 1; 13	SNE; 2; 13	SNE; 3; 16	DON; 1 Ret	DON; 2; 13	DON; 3; 11	17th	5	
2005	Kartworld Racing	MG ZS		DON; 1	DON; 2	DON; 3	THR; 1	THR; 2	THR; 3	BRH; 1	BRH; 2	BRH; 3	OUL; 1	OUL; 2	OUL; 3	CRO; 1	CRO; 2	CRO; 3	MON; 1; 10	MON; 2; 7	MON; 3; 8	SNE; 1	SNE; 2	SNE; 3	KNO; 1; 11	KNO; 2; 7	KNO; 3; 8	SIL; 1	SIL; 2	SIL; 3	BRH; 1; 10	BRH; 2; 8	BRH; 3; 8	13th	22	
2006	Kartworld Racing	MG ZS		BRH; 1; 9	BRH; 2; 11	BRH; 3; 9	MON; 1; 11	MON; 2 DNS	MON; 3 Ret	OUL; 1; 12	OUL; 2 DNS	OUL; 3; 10	THR; 1; 9	THR; 2; 10	THR; 3; 9	CRO; 1; 14	CRO; 2; 12	CRO; 3; 11	DON; 1; 15	DON; 2 Ret	DON; 3 Ret	SNE; 1; 10	SNE; 2 Ret	SNE; 3; 15	KNO; 1; 8	KNO; 2; 4	KNO; 3 Ret	BRH; 1 Ret	BRH; 2; 10	BRH; 3; 9	SIL; 1; 15	SIL; 2; 9	**SIL**; **3**; **11**	15th	27	
2007	Kartworld Racing	MG ZS		BRH; 1 Ret	BRH; 2 Ret	BRH; 3; 12	ROC; 1; 12	ROC; 2; 9	ROC; 3 Ret	THR; 1; 12	THR; 2; 9	THR; 3; 9	CRO; 1 Ret	CRO; 2; 8	CRO; 3; 11	OUL; 1; 11	OUL; 2 Ret	OUL; 3 DNS	DON; 1 Ret	DON; 2 Ret	DON; 3; 15	SNE; 1; 10	SNE; 2; 11	SNE; 3; 13	BRH; 1 Ret	BRH; 2; 8	BRH; 3; 11	KNO; 1 Ret	KNO; 2; 14	KNO; 3; 12	THR; 1; 14	THR; 2 Ret	THR; 3; 14	16th	13	
2008	Team KWR	MG ZS		BRH; 1; 16	BRH; 2; 13	BRH; 3; 13	ROC; 1; 14	ROC; 2; 14	ROC; 3; 15	DON; 1; 11	DON; 2; 10	DON; 3; 14	THR; 1; 16	THR; 2; 18	THR; 3; 13	CRO; 1; 14	CRO; 2; 12	CRO; 3 DNS	SNE; 1; 16	SNE; 2; 12	SNE; 3; 12	OUL; 1 Ret	OUL; 2; 15	OUL; 3; 10	KNO; 1 Ret	KNO; 2 Ret	KNO; 3; 16	SIL; 1; 14	SIL; 2; 11	SIL; 3 Ret	BRH; 1 Ret	BRH; 2; 14	BRH; 3; 15	20th	2	

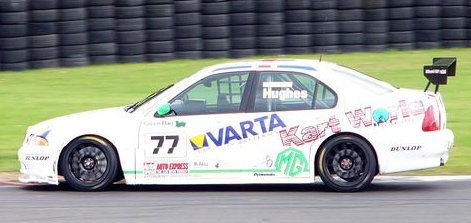
Hughes driving the Kartworld-run MG ZS at the Croft round of the 2004 British Touring Car Championship.

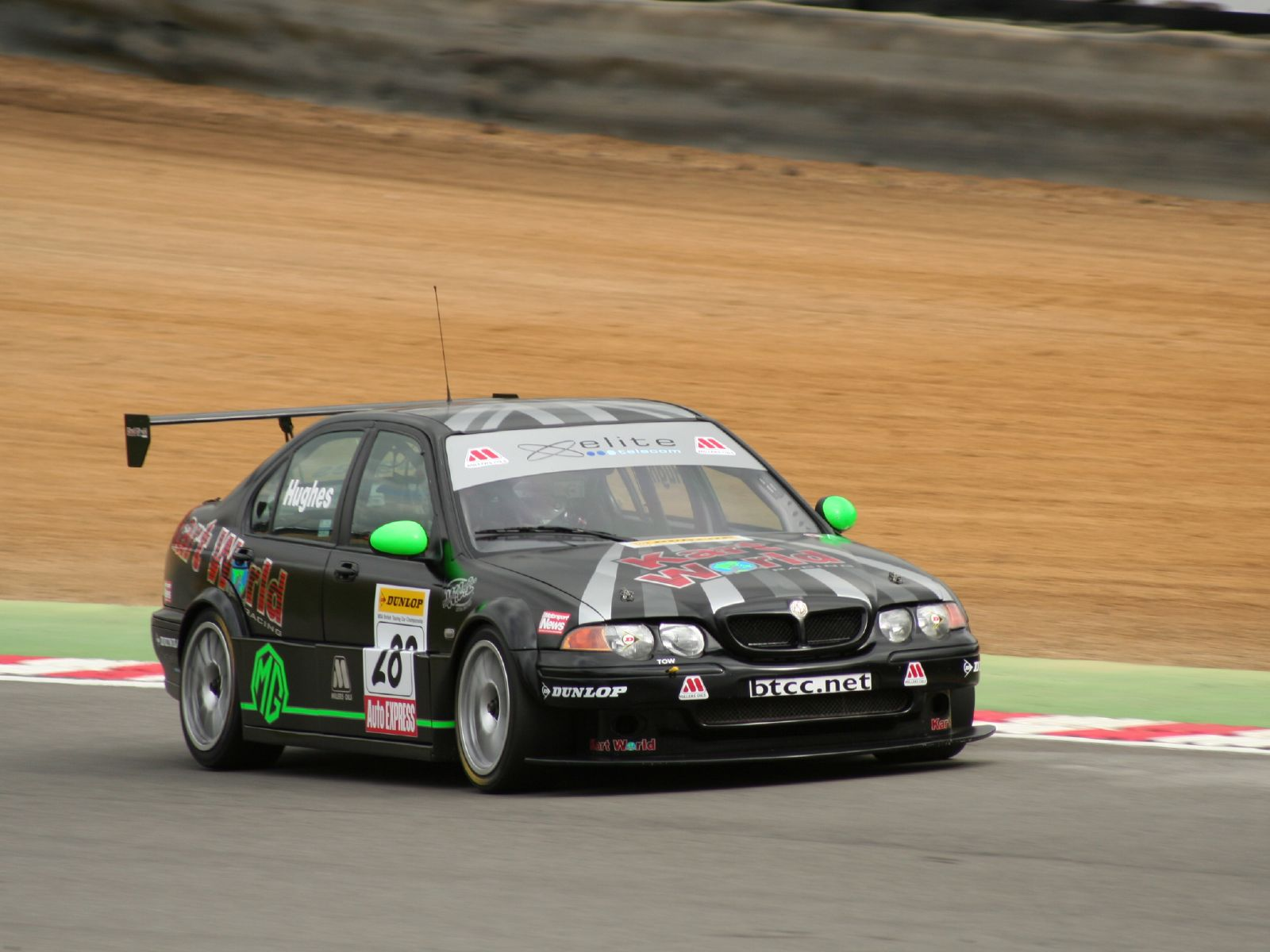
Hughes driving the Kartworld-run MG ZS at the Brands Hatch round of the 2006 British Touring Car Championship.

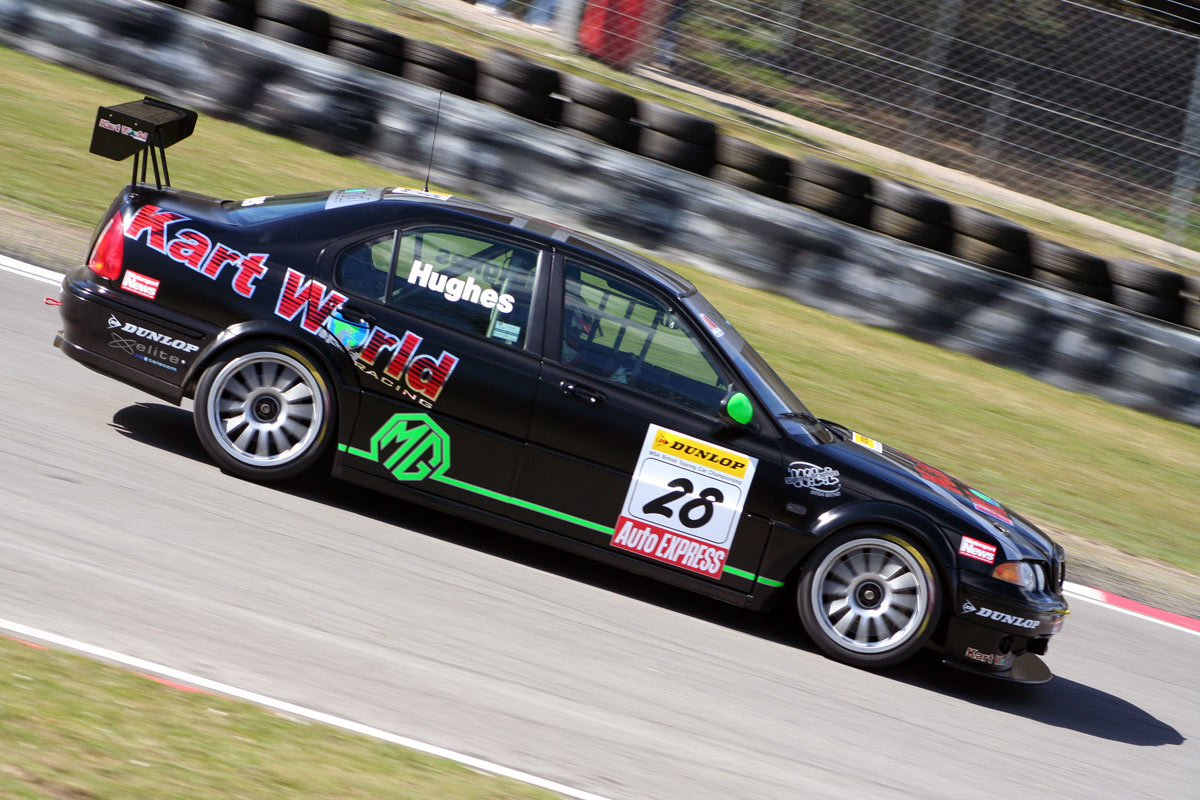
Hughes driving the Kartworld-run MG ZS at the Brands Hatch round of the 2006 British Touring Car Championship.

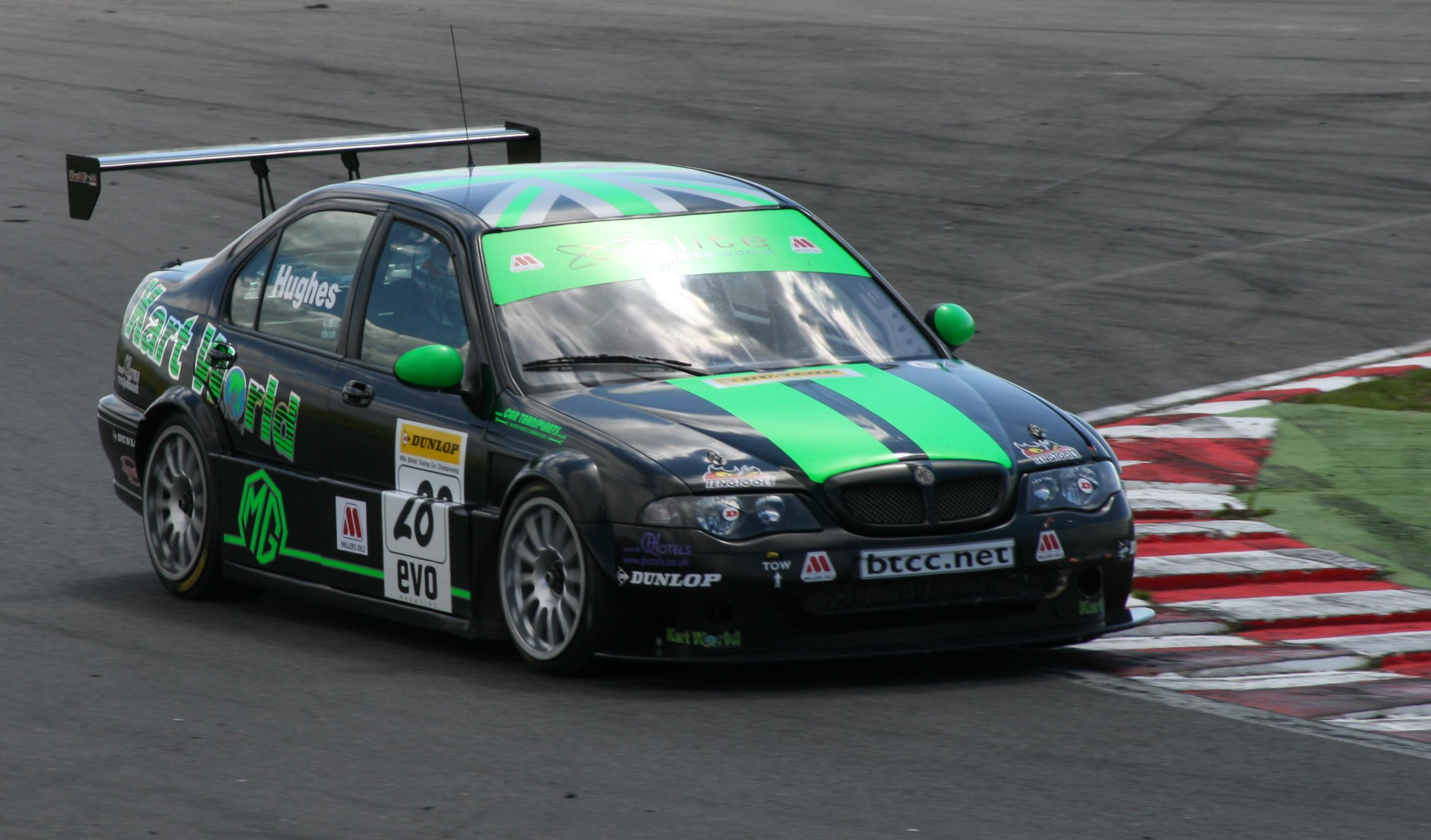
Hughes driving the Kartworld MG ZS at Snetterton during 2007.
