= BTC-T MG ZS EX259 =

BTCC MG ZS EX259
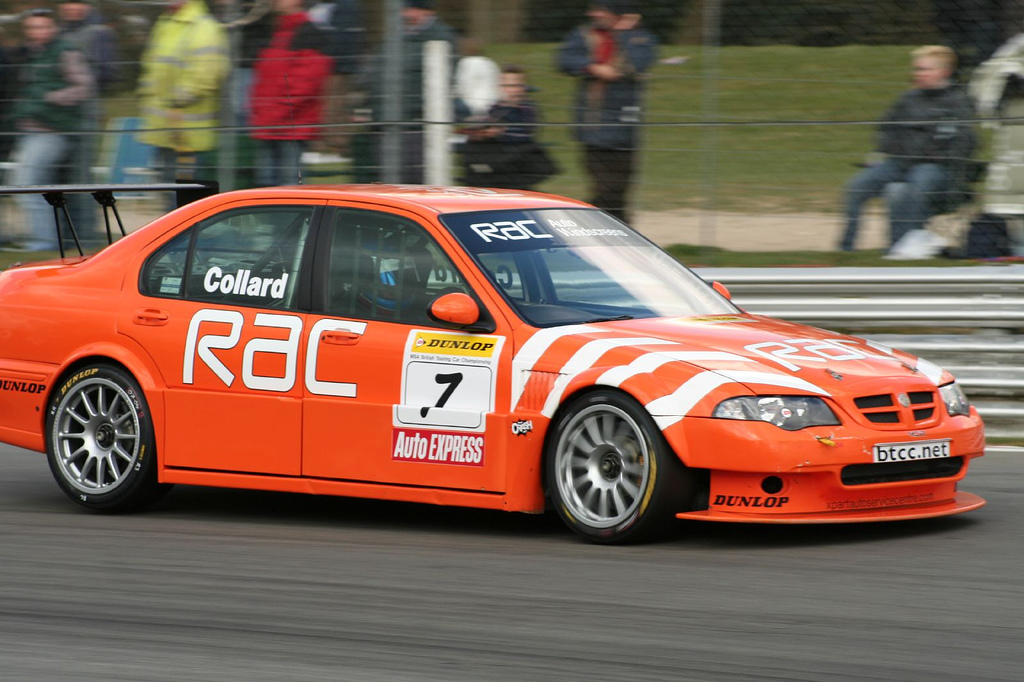
- MG ZS at Brands Hatch, 18 April 2006; Rob Collard behind the wheel of the WSR
- Category: BTCC
- Constructor: West Surrey Racing / Lola

Technical specifications
- Chassis: MG ZS
- Length: 4,650 mm (183.1 in)
- Width: 1,700 mm (66.9 in)
- Axle track: 1,860 mm (73.2 in)
- Wheelbase: 2,620 mm (103.1 in)
- Engine: AER KV6 1,997 cc (121.9 cu in) 270 hp (201 kW; 274 PS) V6 NA front-mounted, FWD
- Transmission: Xtrac 6-speed Sequential
- Weight: 1,150 kg (2,535.3 lb) (including driver)

Competition history
- Notable entrants: WSR; Kartworld Racing
- Notable drivers: Colin Turkington; Anthony Reid; Warren Hughes; Rob Collard; Gareth Howell; Jason Hughes; Fiona Leggate
- Debut: 2001 BTCC at Silverstone
Races	Wins	Poles	F/Laps
196(2001-2008)	15	7	30
- Teams' Championships: 0
- Constructors' Championships: 0
- Drivers' Championships: 0

The BTC-T MG ZS EX259 is a BTC-Touring class racing car that was built for the 2001 British Touring Car Championship season by West Surrey Racing, who ran MG's official works program.

== Works career ==
Partway through the 2001 BTCC season, WSR began entering their BTCC spec MG ZS, returning as a works MG team under the name of MG Sport & Racing. The new car's first appearance was in round 21, held at Silverstone, driven by Anthony Reid and Warren Hughes. Although ineligible to score points, the car showed some initial promise, with a victory at Brands Hatch Indy Circuit, the penultimate round of the season - indeed, it was the only non-Vauxhall entry to win in 2001.

For 2002, WSR entered 4 cars - 2 MG Sport & Racing entries for Reid and Hughes, and a satellite team, racing under the "Team Atomic Kitten" banner, with Gareth Howell and Colin Turkington driving for this team. The car proved to be reasonably competitive in its first full season; WSR finished 2nd in both the Teams and Manufacturers standings, and Reid finished 4th in the Driver's championship. However, they were 151 points behind the Triple 8-entered Astra Coupes in the Manufacturers championship, as that team remained dominant.

For 2003, the team entered 3 cars for Reid, Turkington and Hughes, this time all entered as works drivers. The season proved to be less successful than 2002 - with Honda Racing demoting MG to 3rd in both the Constructors and Teams standings, although MG once again won 3 races, with Reid slipping to 6th in the Drivers championship.

== Independent's career ==
After 3 seasons, MG withdrew their works support for WSR in 2004. WSR, however, continued to enter a pair of MG ZS, driven by Reid and Turkington, whilst Jason Hughes entered an older ZS in his own Kartworld Racing team. Using their 3 years of knowledge gained from developing the car, the team won the Independents championship, and also a 3rd place in the Team standings. Anthony Reid was once again the best-placed driver, finishing an impressive 4th in the Driver's championship standings, and was crowned as the Independent champion.

With Turkington departing for VX Racing, and Reid being involved in an abortive MG entry for the 2005 DTM season, WSR chose to enter a single car, driven by Rob Collard, whilst Jason Hughes continued to enter his MG ZS, albeit at select events. Despite a low budget, Collard impressed, managing to secure 2 wins, and he finished 7th overall.

For 2006, Turkington returned to the team, partnering the retained Collard. The team made the decision to switch to the facelifted ZS model, the A new sponsorship deal was struck with the RAC, with the team now entering cars under the Team RAC name. A successful season followed, with Turkington finishing runner-up in the Independents, and finishing in a fine 3rd place overall. Team RAC switched to the BMW 320si for 2007, thus ending a 6-year partnership between MG and WSR. Kartworld Racing entered 2 cars, running on bio-ethanol, in 2007 (driven by Hughes and Fiona Leggate), reducing down to 1 for 2008, which would prove to be the cars final season in the BTCC.
