= MG ZS (2001) =

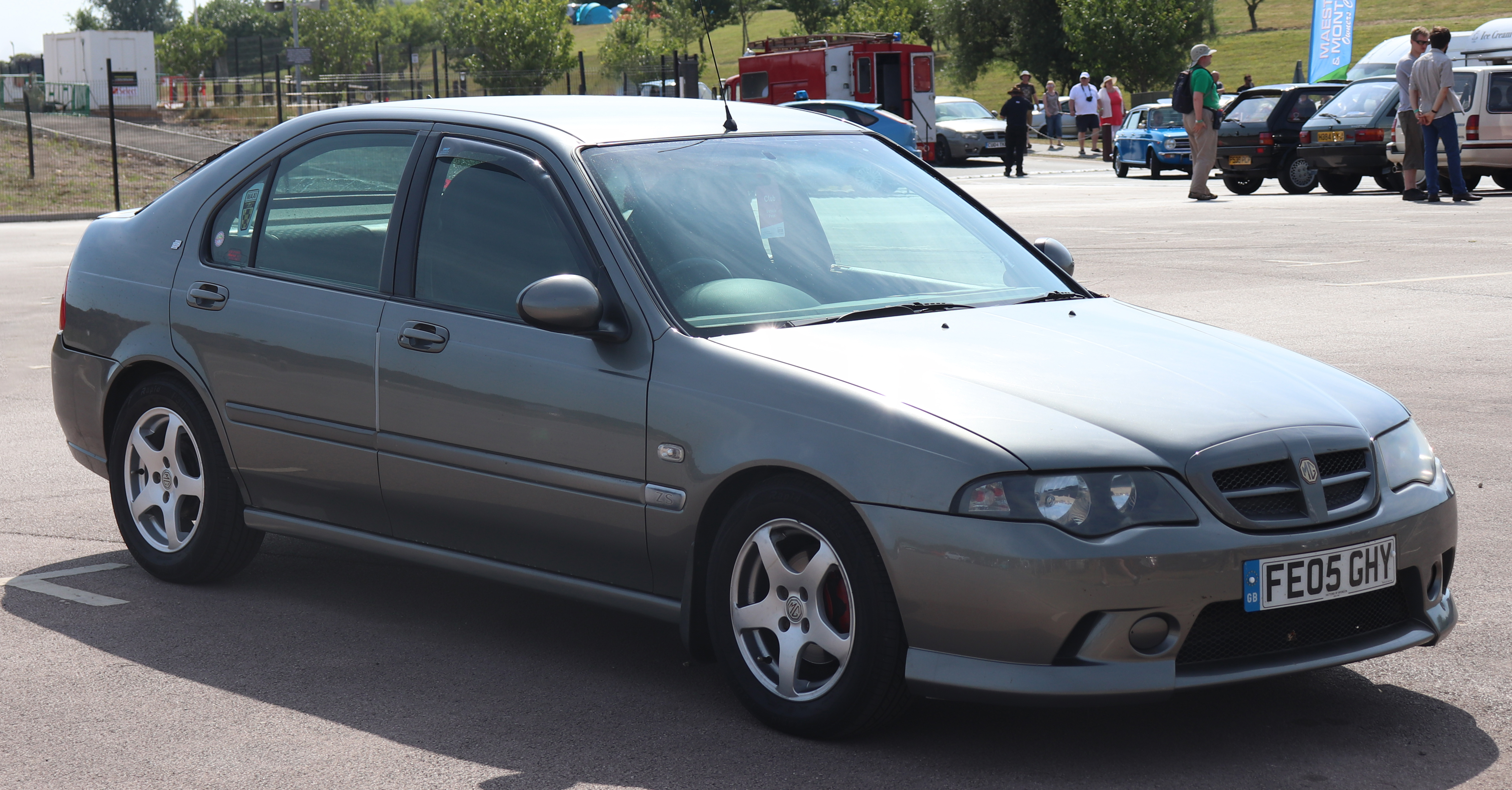

Overview
- Manufacturer: MG (MG Rover)
- Production: 2001–2005
- Assembly: United Kingdom: Longbridge, Birmingham (Longbridge Plant)

Body and chassis
- Class: Small family car (C)
- Body style: 4-door saloon; 5-door hatchback
- Layout: Front-engine, front-wheel-drive
- Related: Honda Domani; Rover 45

Powertrain
- Engine: Petrol: 1.4 L K-series I4 (ZS105; Ireland and Portugal); 1.6 L K-series I4 (ZS110); 1.8 L K-series I4 (ZS120); 2.5 L KV6 V6 (ZS180); Diesel: 2.0 L L-series turbodiesel I4 (ZS TD, ZS TD 115)

Chronology
- Predecessor: MG Montego
- Successor: MG5; MG6

The MG ZS is a sports family car that was built by MG Rover from 2001 until 2005. The ZS is essentially a tuned version of the Rover 45 (which was launched in 1999). The 45 in turn is a facelifted version of the Rover 400 which was launched in hatchback form in 1995 and saloon form in 1996, which in turn was derived from the Honda Domani.

== Development ==
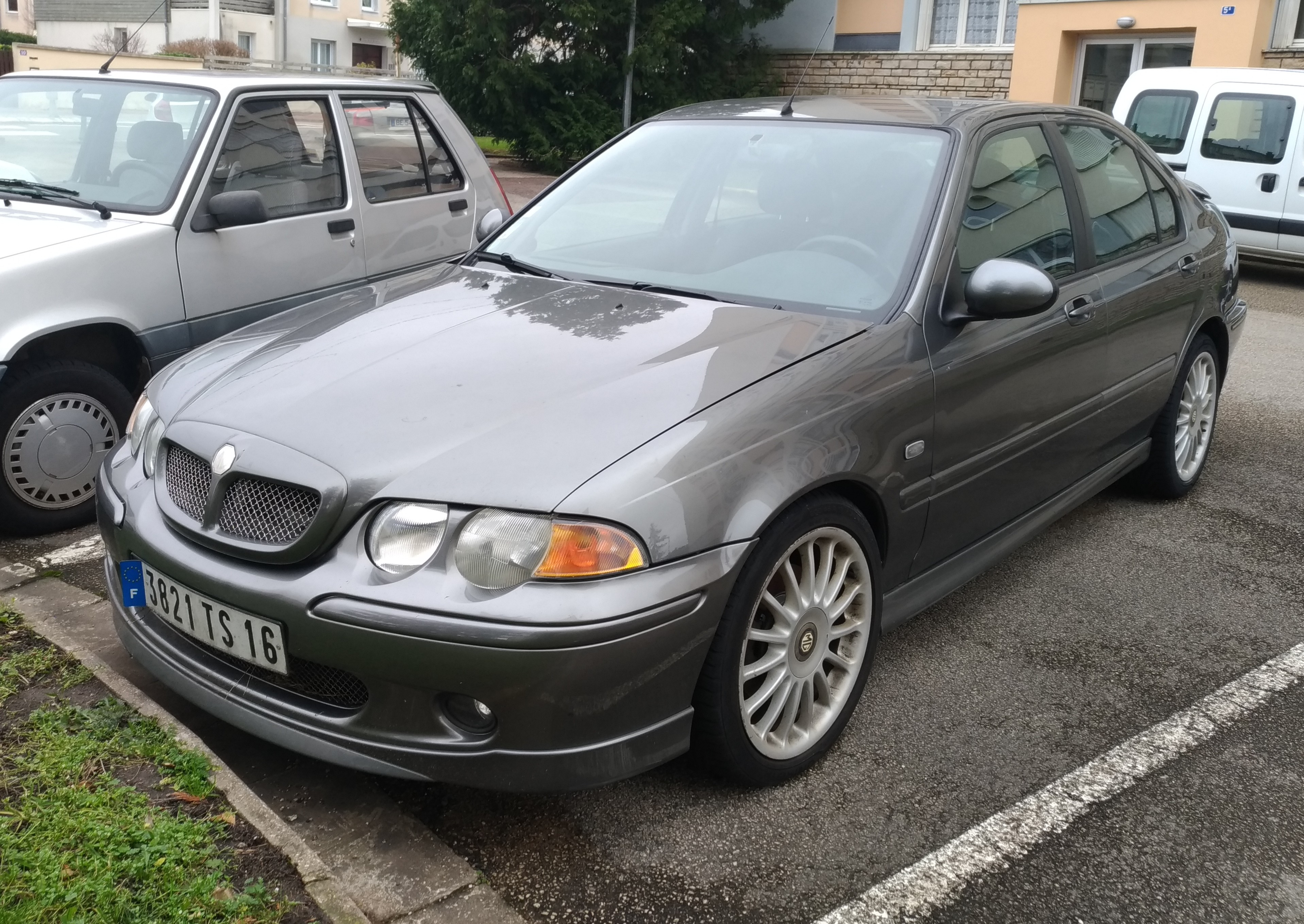
MG ZS 120 (hatchback)

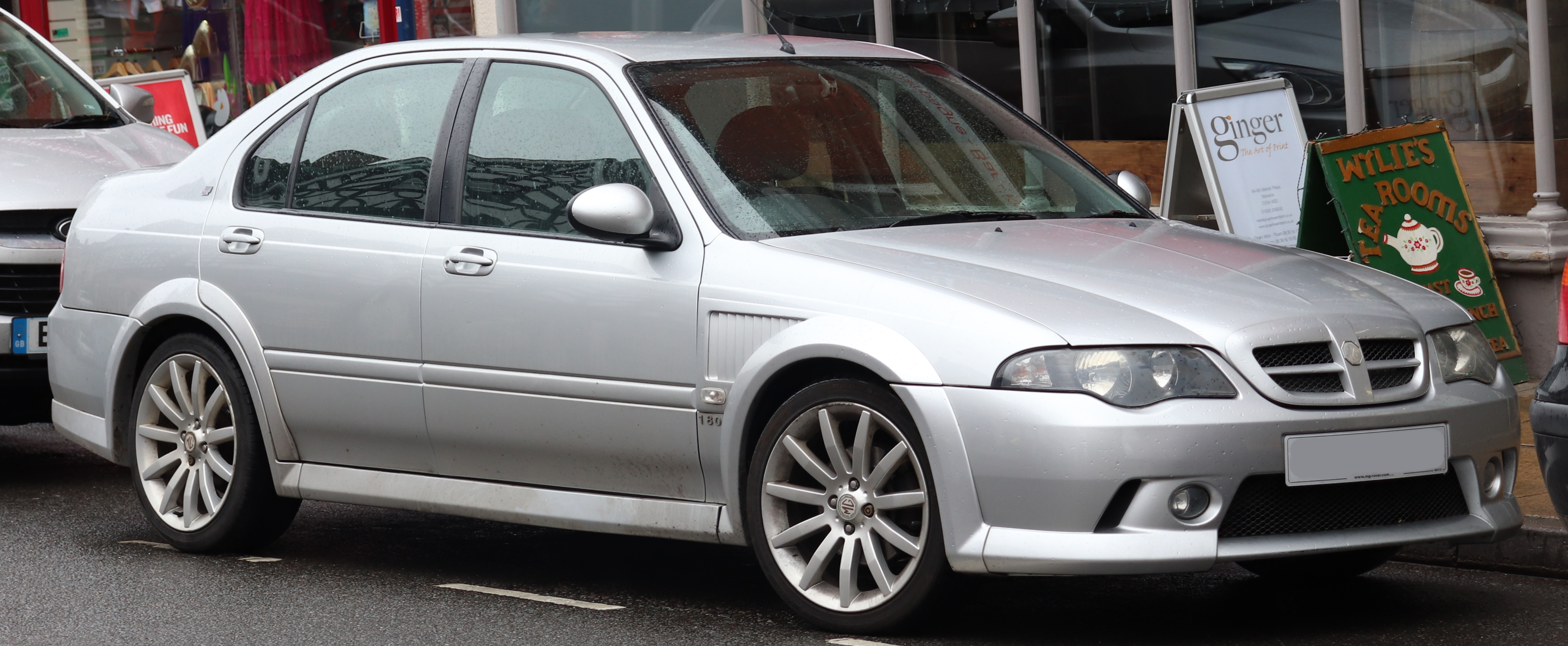
2004 MG ZS 180 saloon (facelift)

The model was rapidly created from the Rover 45 after BMW sold off Rover in April 2000. Development of the model was greatly accelerated by the fact that Rover had already created 400 Series prototypes of the car using V6 engines and sporting suspension setups. In fact, MG Rover developed MG versions of all three Rover cars on sale at the time.

The Rover 45 donor car did not have a reputation for being a driver's car, but in fact it was the most suitable car in the Rover range for making into the MG ZS, its Honda heritage providing double wishbone front suspension and fully independent multi link rear suspension.

As a Rover, the 45 was optimised for comfort rather than handling – however, as an MG the opposite was the case. The ZS 180, offering 175 bhp (130 kW; 177 PS) from the 2.5 L V6 engine and acceleration to 60 mph in 7.3 seconds, received favourable reviews in the press, with particular praise for its steering, handling and suspension.

Setting the ZS apart from most rivals was the V6 configuration, when most of its rivals were using turbocharged engines.

== Variants and updates ==
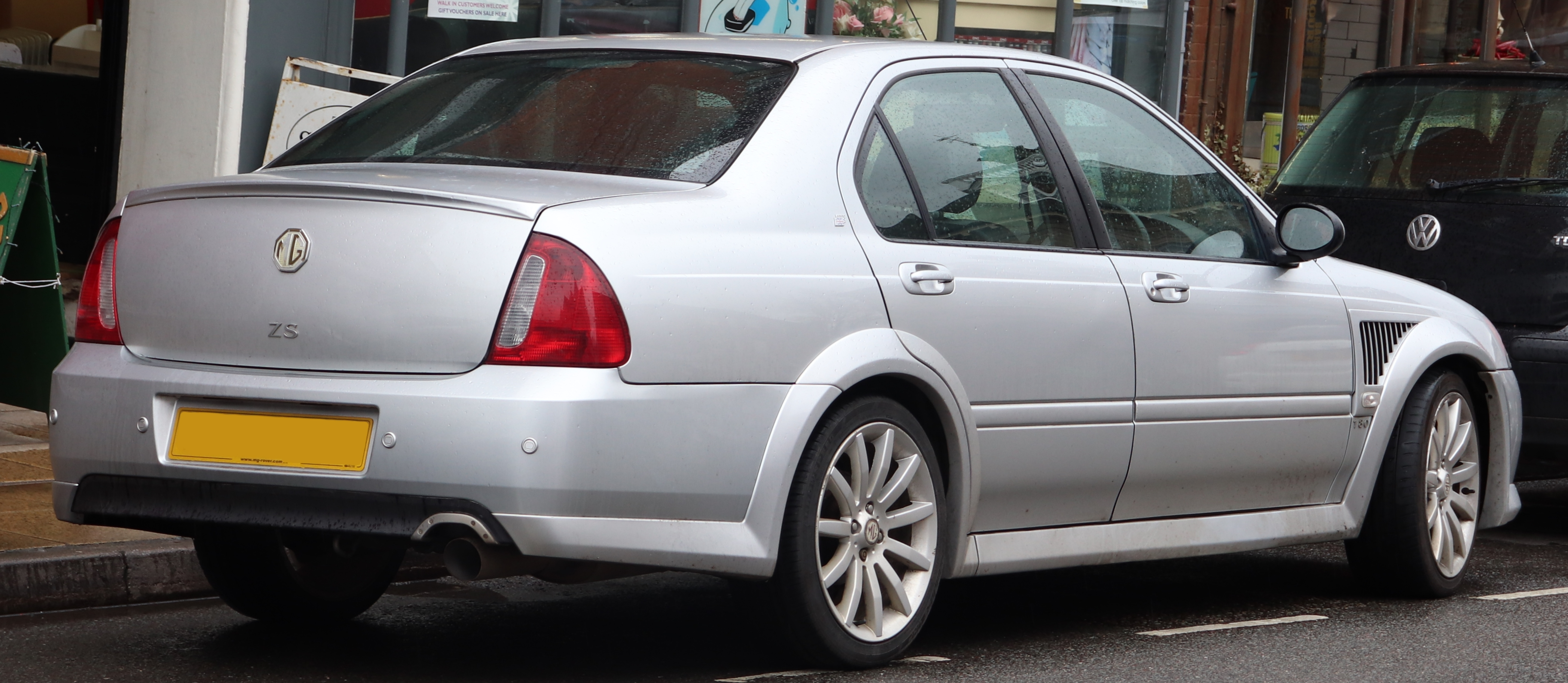
Facelift MG ZS 180 (saloon)

The non-appearance of RD/X60 meant that in the first few months the MGZS was facelifted with the help of the car designer Peter Stevens (together with the rest of the MG Rover range) which introduced a new clear one-piece headlight, new bumpers and a flush tailgate/boot lid with the number plate relocated to the rear bumper together with new wheel designs, colours and a revised interior with climate control using parts from Zonda and Lamborghini, and with all ZS models an optional body kit which was derived from the MG XPower SV was fitted as standard on the ranging topping ZS180.

The retro design cues adopted when the 400 became the 45 were dropped, for the first time the Rover 45 and MG ZS became noticeably different looking cars.

The first attempt at launching the MG 5 name in the sedan model firstly came in April 2005 at the bankruptcy of Rover. Due to Honda owning the rights to the Rover 45's design and platform at the time along with eventual joint talks between Nanjing Auto and MG to purchase the MG brand, Honda stopped their licensing agreement with MG in response and the Rover 45-based MG 5 in its 2004 facelifted hatchback form never saw production in China. Despite Nanjing Auto's attempt to work out a deal with Honda to establish a joint venture, this would've raised competition concerns as Honda already had joint ventures with GAC Honda and Dongfeng Honda at the time. In 2009 at the Shanghai Auto Show, Nanjing Auto tried again with the MG5 name. This time, the car was based on the 2004 facelifted MG ZS. The MG ZS-based MG 5 project was then cancelled entirely. The MG 5 name however would later be produced by SAIC Motor as a completely new model from 2012 onwards.

== Performance ==
Performance data for the MG ZS range:

Model	Engine	Power	Torque	0–60 mph (0–97 km/h)	Top speed
ZS105 (Republic of Ireland and Portugal only)	1.4 L K-Series	102 hp (76 kW; 103 PS) at 6000 rpm	138 N·m (91 ft·lbf) at 4500 rpm	10.1 sec	110 mph (177 km/h)
ZS110	1.6 L K-Series	107 hp (80 kW; 108 PS) at 6000 rpm	138 N·m (101 ft·lbf) at 4500 rpm	9.8 sec	119 mph (192 km/h)
ZS120	1.8 L K-Series	115 hp (86 kW; 117 PS) at 5500 rpm	160 N·m (118 ft·lbf) at 2750 rpm	9.0 sec	122 mph (196 km/h)
ZS120 Auto	1.8 L K-Series	115 hp (86 kW; 117 PS) at 5500 rpm	160 N·m (118 ft·lbf) at 2750 rpm	9.9 sec	115 mph (185 km/h)
ZS180	2.5 L KV6	175 hp (130 kW; 177 PS) at 6500 rpm	240 N·m (177 ft·lbf) at 4000 rpm	7.3 sec	139 mph (224 km/h)
ZS TD	2.0 L L-Series	99 hp (74 kW; 100 PS) at 4200 rpm	240 N·m (177 ft·lbf) at 2000 rpm	10.3 sec	116 mph
ZS TD 115	2.0 L L-Series	111 hp (83 kW; 113 PS) at 4200 rpm	260 N·m (191 ft·lbf) at 2000 rpm	9.5 sec	120 mph (193 km/h)

== ZS 180 ==
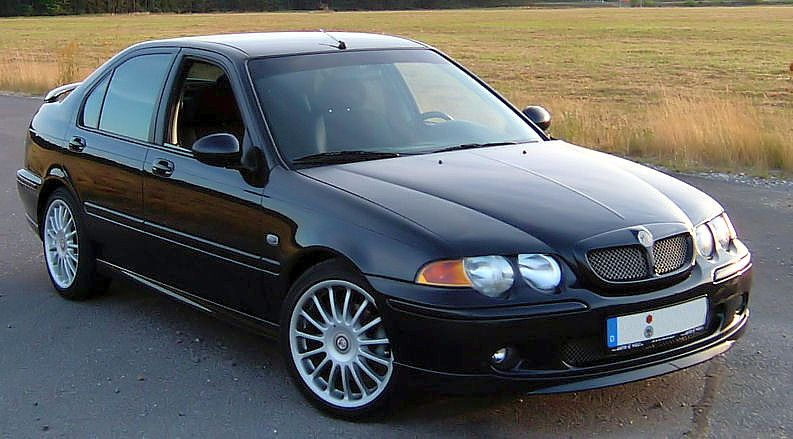
MG ZS 180, with no cost option smaller standard size boot lid spoiler

The MG ZS 180 was the flagship car of the ZS range. It was available as a five-door hatch or a four-door saloon. The 180 included a number of changes over the standard ZS, as well as incorporating all of the features of the ZS+ models, the ZS 180 was equipped with a lightweight all alloy 2.5-litre Rover KV6 Engine, with quad cams and twenty four valves.

The 180 features uprated front and rear brakes, with 282 mm (11.1 in) front discs (up from 262 mm (10.3 in)) and 260 mm (10.2 in) rear discs (up from 240 mm (9.4 in)) as well as ABS and EBD, lowered sports suspension with uprated springs and dampers, uprated bushes fitted to front upper and rear trailing arms, 17-inch sports alloy wheels with 205/45 R17 tyres.

Externally, the 180 can be identified with deep front bumper, with front bib spoiler and fog lamps and sculptured side sills. A large rear spoiler could be substituted for a standard size as a no cost option.

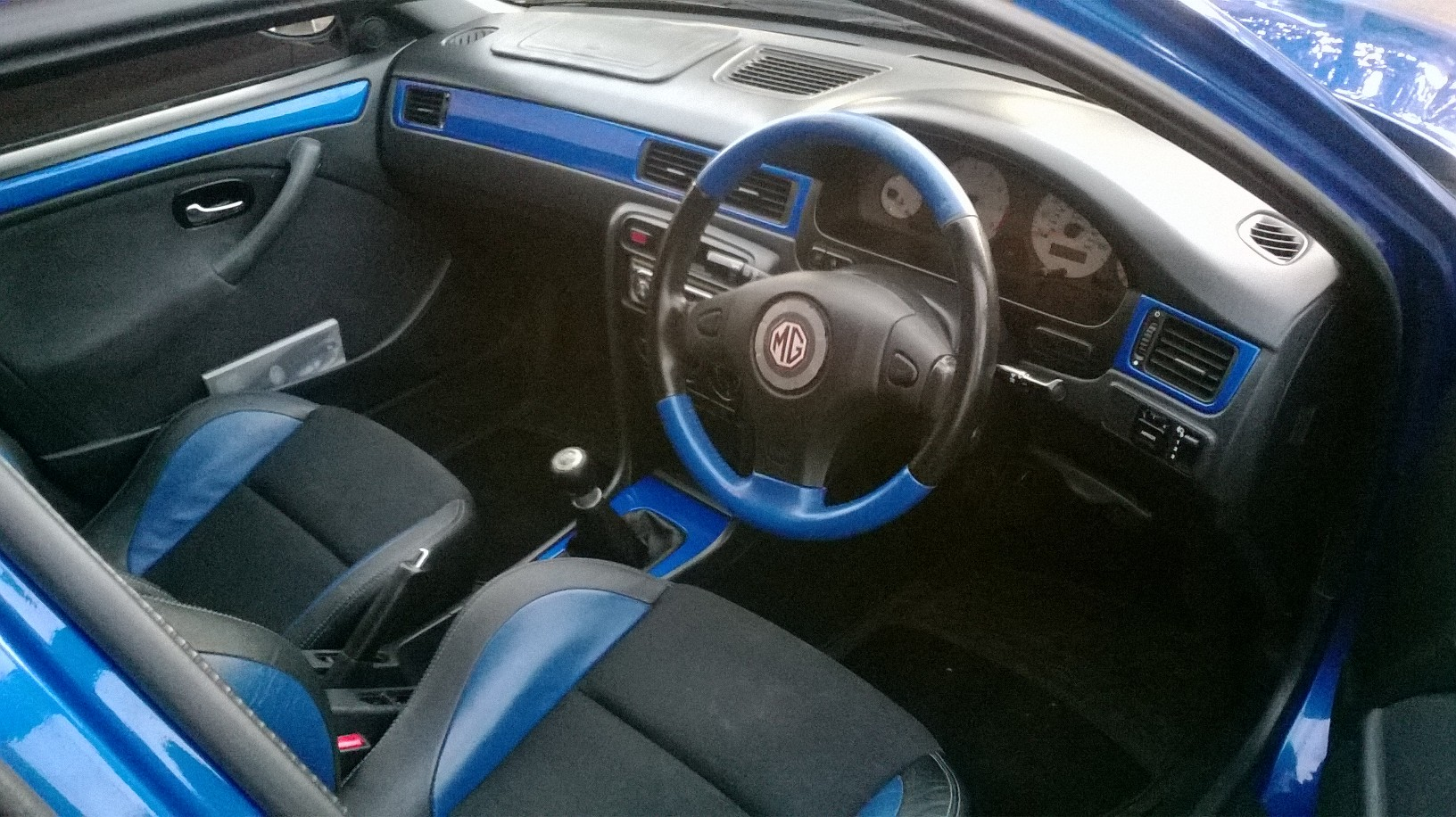
2003 MG ZS 180 cabin, with optional Trophy blue trim

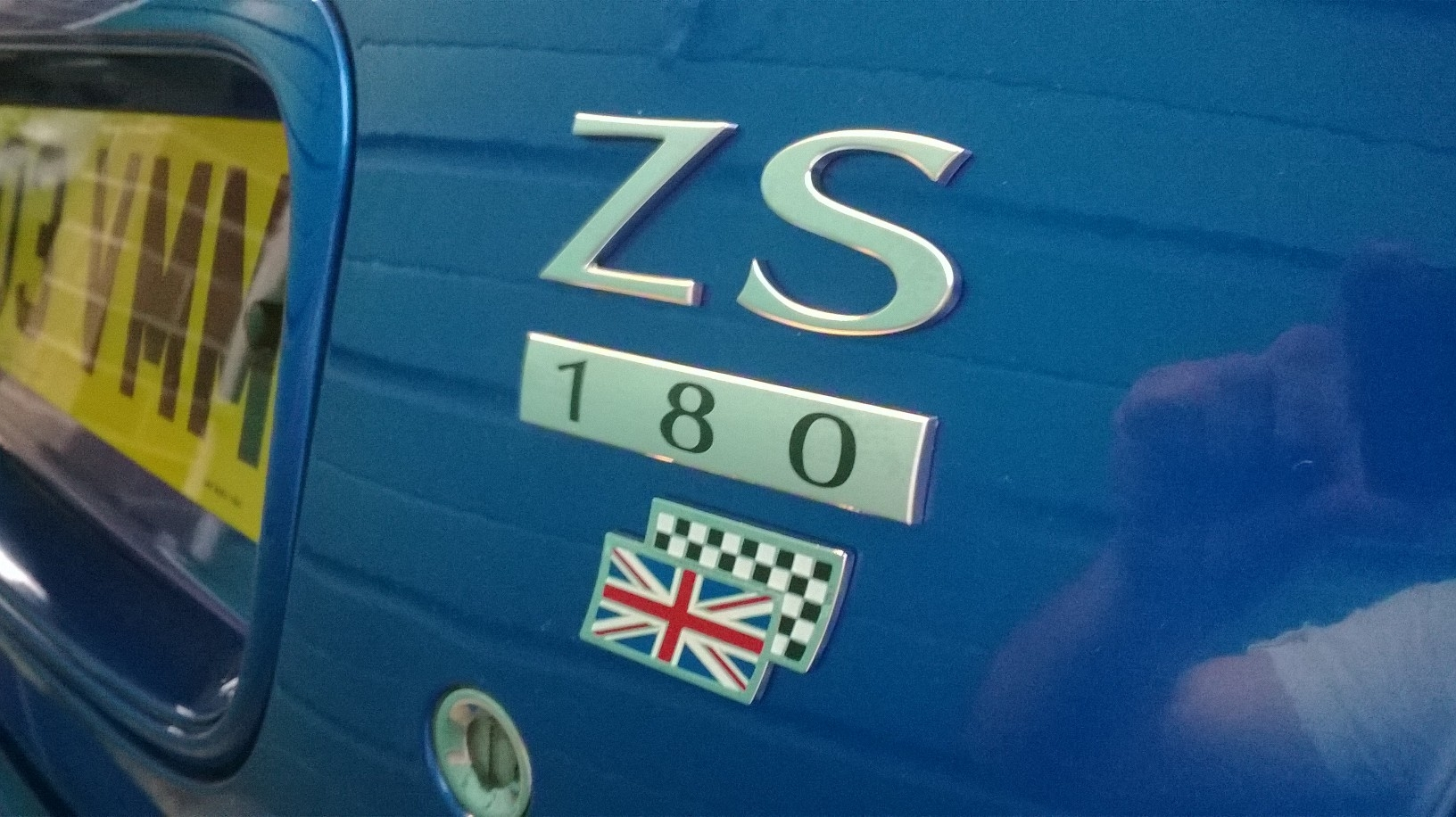
2003 MG ZS 180 (boot lid badges)

The 180 was facelifted in 2004, along with the rest of the range, and gained a bodykit inspired by the MG Xpower SV.

The kit incorporated wheel arch extensions with front wing vents, bumper spats and side skirts. The large 'Extreme' rear spoiler became optional, with a subtle lip boot spoiler fitted as standard. Complementing the new bodykit were the new 17-inch 'eleven spokes' alloy wheels. Both the wheels and bodykit were available as cost options on the rest of the range.

The MG ZS 180's 2.5-litre (2497 cc) V6 engine produces 177 PS (130 kW; 175 bhp) at 6,500 rpm and 240 N⋅m (177 lb⋅ft) at 4,000 rpm, giving a 0 to 60 mph time of 7.3 seconds, and a top speed of 139 mph (224 km/h), with a combined fuel economy reading of 29 mpg.

== Racing ==
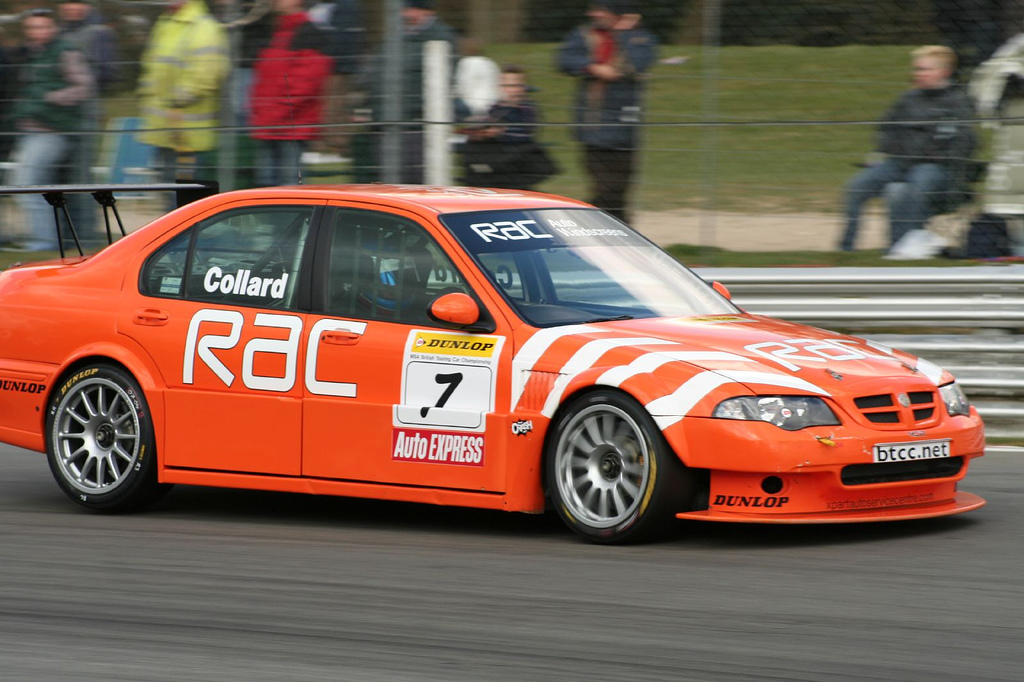
Rob Collard's MG ZS 2006

The MGZS was raced in the British Touring Car Championship (BTCC) from 2001 to 2008. The West Surrey Racing (WSR) team enjoyed 'works' status for several years and initially ran cars with a two-litre version of the Rover KV6 engine, later switching to four cylinder JUDD engine which was heavy modified K-Series which had a capacity of 2.0 Litres (the largest production K series engine was 1.8 Litres).

Ex WSR V6 cars have appeared in other hands, and a 'junior team' was run in during 2002.

MG BTCC drivers to date have been:

Year	Team	Drivers
2001 (partial season)	MG Sport and Racing (WSR)	Anthony Reid (2), Warren Hughes (20)
2002	MG Sport and Racing (WSR)	Anthony Reid, Warren Hughes
2002	Team Atomic Kitten (semi-works junior team)	Colin Turkington, Gareth Howell
2003	MG Sport and Racing (WSR)	Anthony Reid, Warren Hughes, Colin Turkington
2004	West Surrey Racing	Anthony Reid, Colin Turkington
2004	Kartworld Racing	Jason Hughes
2005	West Surrey Racing	Rob Collard
2005 (Partial Season)	Kartworld Racing	Jason Hughes
2006	Team RAC (WSR)	Rob Collard, Colin Turkington
2006	Kartworld Racing	Jason Hughes
2007	Kartworld Racing	Jason Hughes, Fiona Leggate
2008	KW Racing (Kartworld Racing renamed)	Jason Hughes

== What the press said ==
Reviewers generally praised the handling and performance of the ZS, particularly the ZS 180, but criticized the interior quality.

"Drive a ZS180 back to back with a Golf V5, probably the sportiest of the line, and the Rover (based car) stomps all over the Volkswagen, its steering, chassis and engine beating the German into submission over the sort of lumpen road surfaces that make up the British B road"

"Of all the cars transformed by Rover's engineers, this motor is perhaps the most remarkable, as it turned the originally rather dowdy 45 into a fire breathing super saloon"

"When young lads start lusting after what's basically a rebodied and reengineered Rover 45, it's obviously something special. It is no exaggeration to claim that the MG ZS 180 was the biggest surprise of the lot when the new range was launched in summer 2001."

"At first glance it might appear to be a simple case of badge engineering, but the transformation from ageing Rover 45 to exciting MG ZS is a lot more than simply swapping metal monikers. Beneath the wire-meshed MG nose and bespoilered tail lies a lot of skilful engineering by Longbridge’s finest."
