= 2008 British Touring Car Championship =

51st season of the British Touring Car Championship

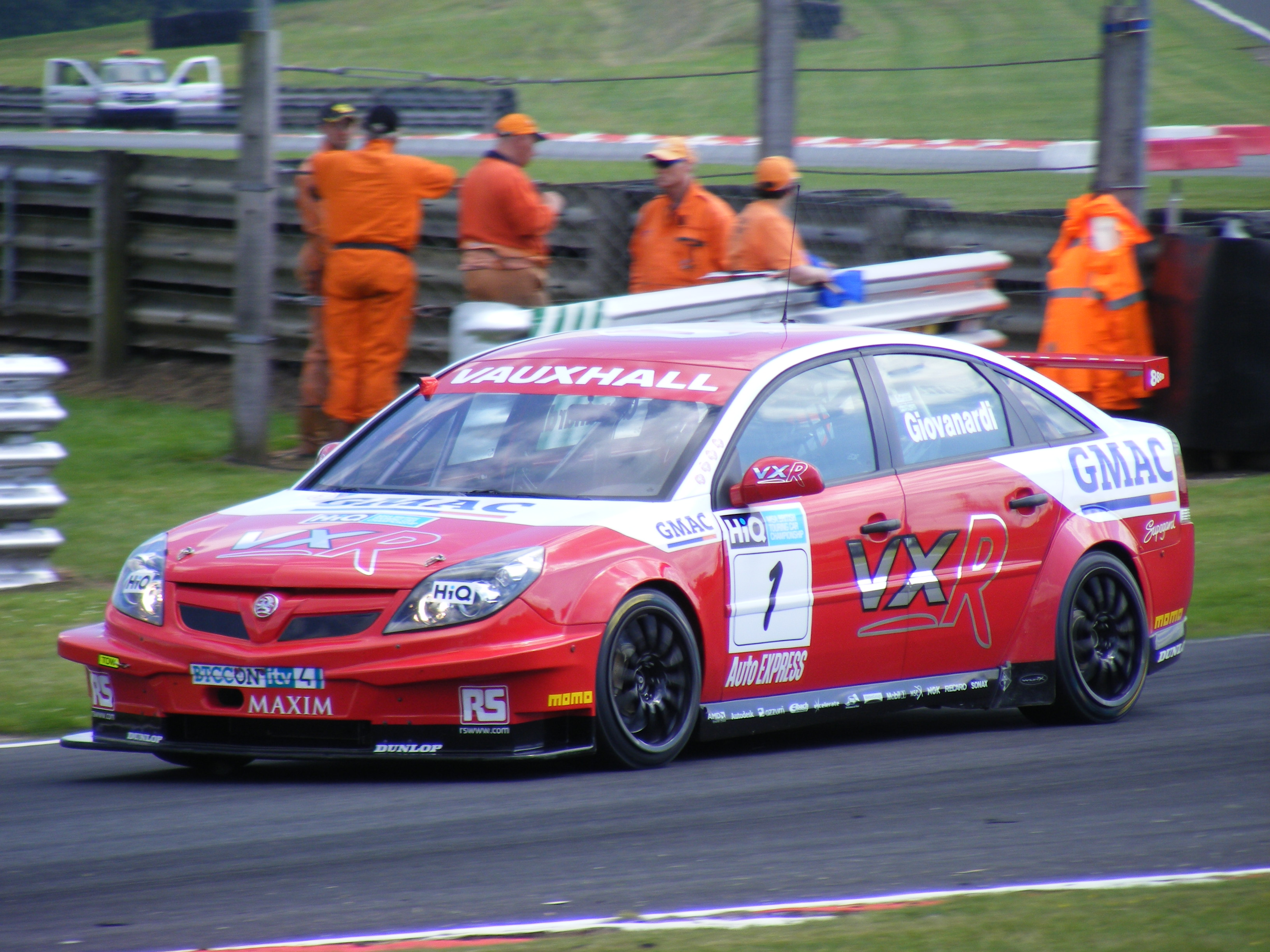
The drivers' championship was won by Fabrizio Giovanardi for the VX Racing team.

The 2008 HiQ MSA British Touring Car Championship season was the 51st British Touring Car Championship (BTCC) season. It was also the first that the championship was sponsored by HiQ. Fabrizio Giovanardi won his second consecutive title. It would also, as of 2026, be the final time Vauxhall took the overall drivers title and the last for Triple Eight Racing before its closure in 2017.

== Changes for 2008 ==
=== Teams and drivers ===
After capturing the Drivers and Manufacturers titles in their first season with the Vectra, the Triple 8-run works Vauxhall squad expanded to three cars for 2008. Reigning champion Fabrizio Giovanardi remained on board, being joined by Matt Neal, returning to Vauxhall for the first time since 2002 after leaving his family-run Team Dynamics squad, with whom he won back-to-back titles in 2005 and 2006. The third car was piloted by Tom Onslow-Cole, who impressed at the wheel of a WSR BMW in his debut BTCC campaign in 2007.

SEAT were once again the only other full-works operation, and fitted their Leons with the rapid yet often unreliable turbo diesel engines being used by the marque's World Touring Car Championship operation. Jason Plato, who came extremely close to securing a second BTCC title the previous year, remained on board, as did GT convert Darren Turner.

Tom Chilton, moving the opposite direction after two years with Vauxhall, replaced the outgoing Neal at Team Dynamics (again running as Team Halfords), with Gordon Shedden remaining on board in the other of their self-developed Honda Civics. As with the previous year, in spite of not being a factory-backed operation, the cars were not eligible for Independents points due to their dominance of the category with the Integra in 2005 and 2006.

West Surrey Racing (again running as Team RAC) campaigned the BMW 320is for a second year, with reigning Independents champion Colin Turkington again heading the team and single-seater convert Stephen Jelley replacing the Vauxhall-bound Onslow-Cole. Mat Jackson returned in his 320is after a successful debut season in 2007, with his small family-run operation now enjoying BMW Dealer Team UK backing.

Motorbase Performance also joined the BMW brigade after ditching their SEAT Toledos, with former Independents champion Rob Collard returned to the series full-time with the team after spending most of 2007 away. He was partnered by Steven Kane, who had been a front-runner for the team in the Porsche Carrera Cup Great Britain after making the switch from single-seaters. Also leaving the Toledo behind for 2008 were GR Asia (again running under the Team Air Cool banner), who switched to a newer Leon (which ran with its original petrol engine unlike the works cars) for the returning Adam Jones.

Team Eurotech continued with the ex-Team Dynamics Honda Integra for a third year, expanding to two cars with team boss Mike Jordan now joined by his 18-year-old son Andrew, who had impressed in rallycross before making his road racing debut in the Renault Clio Cup in 2007. John George also campaigned his Integra for a second year with TH Motorsport.

Alan Taylor returned for a full season in his Integra with Robertshaw Racing, having debuted in the closing meetings of 2007. The team also added a pair of ex-WTCC Chevrolet Lacettis to their line-up driven by Matt Allison, switching from Motorbase, and SEAT Cupra Championship graduate Harry Vaulkhard, the first Chevrolets to compete in the series since 1975. Allison left the team due to budgetary reasons after the first three meetings and was not replaced.

Among the other returnees were Kartworld Racing (entered as Team KWR), who continued to run the venerable MG ZS, cutting back to a single example for team boss Jason Hughes, after failing to acquire an ex-Team Dynamics Honda Integra. Tech-Speed Motorsport, again running under the Arkas Racing banner, expanded to two cars for its second year with the Vauxhall Astra Sport Hatch, Turkey's Erkut Kizilirmak being joined by Martin Bell, who had piloted a Geoff Steel Racing BMW in the previous two years.

BTC Racing began the year running their temperamental Lexus IS200s from the previous two seasons, before switching to a pair of SEAT Toledos acquired from Motorbase from the second round onwards. Team stalwart Chris Stockton remained alongside multiple truck racing champion Stuart Oliver, who was making his first steps into cars. Gareth Howell, who appeared in a Toledo for Motorbase in 2007, was recruited to replace Oliver at meetings that clashed with his truck racing commitments, making two such appearances before Oliver left the championship and the second car was dropped.

The only all-new entry to the championship came in the shape of young Scotsman Michael Doyle, who had been a race winner in the Clio Cup the previous year. He ran a BTCC-spec Honda Civic Type-R, originally built and run by the works Arena operation between 2002 and 2005, with his family-run In-Tune Racing team.

Team 48 Motorsport registered a two-car entry with Darrelle Wilson and Jamaican Matthew Gore as the drivers. The team intended to run the Alfa Romeos run by A-Tech in 2007 but after repeatedly delaying their debut, the team ultimately never raced.

=== Other changes ===
- Dunlop was no longer the title sponsor of the BTCC, being replaced by HiQ. However, both brands shared the same parent company.

== Entry list ==
On 12 March 2008 the BTCC Organisers released the official MSA HiQ British Touring Car Championship entry list for the 2008 season.

Team	Car	No.	Drivers	Rounds
Works Entries
(United Kingdom) VX Racing	Vauxhall Vectra	1	(Italy) Fabrizio Giovanardi	All
(United Kingdom) VX Racing	Vauxhall Vectra	4	(United Kingdom) Matt Neal	All
(United Kingdom) VX Racing	Vauxhall Vectra	10	(United Kingdom) Tom Onslow-Cole	All
(United Kingdom) SEAT Sport UK	SEAT León TDI	11	(United Kingdom) Jason Plato	All
(United Kingdom) SEAT Sport UK	SEAT León TDI	12	(United Kingdom) Darren Turner	All
Constructor Entries
(United Kingdom) Team Halfords	Honda Civic	9	(United Kingdom) Tom Chilton	All
(United Kingdom) Team Halfords	Honda Civic	52	(United Kingdom) Gordon Shedden	All
Independent S2000 Entries
(United Kingdom) Team RAC	BMW 320si	5	(United Kingdom) Colin Turkington	All
(United Kingdom) Team RAC	BMW 320si	50	(United Kingdom) Stephen Jelley	All
(United Kingdom) BMW Dealer Team UK	BMW 320si	7	(United Kingdom) Mat Jackson	All
(United Kingdom) Robertshaw Racing	Chevrolet Lacetti	16	(United Kingdom) Harry Vaulkhard	All
(United Kingdom) Robertshaw Racing	Chevrolet Lacetti	26	(United Kingdom) Matt Allison	1–3
Team 48 Motorsport	Alfa Romeo 156	19	(United Kingdom) Darelle Wilson	None
Team 48 Motorsport	Alfa Romeo 156	48	(Jamaica) Matthew Gore	None
(Hong Kong) Team Air Cool	SEAT León	21	(United Kingdom) Adam Jones	All
(United Kingdom) Motorbase Performance	BMW 320si	24	(United Kingdom) Steven Kane	All
(United Kingdom) Motorbase Performance	BMW 320si	25	(United Kingdom) Rob Collard	All
(United Kingdom) BTC Racing	Lexus IS200	42	(United Kingdom) Stuart Oliver	1–2
(United Kingdom) BTC Racing	Lexus IS200	43	(United Kingdom) Chris Stockton	1–2
(United Kingdom) BTC Racing	SEAT Toledo Cupra	43	(United Kingdom) Chris Stockton	3–5, 7–10
(United Kingdom) BTC Racing	SEAT Toledo Cupra	42	(United Kingdom) Stuart Oliver	3, 5
(United Kingdom) BTC Racing	SEAT Toledo Cupra	44	(United Kingdom) Gareth Howell	4, 7
Independent BTC-T Entries
(United Kingdom) Arkas Racing with sunshine.co.uk	Vauxhall Astra Sport Hatch	15	(United Kingdom) Martyn Bell	All
(United Kingdom) Arkas Racing with sunshine.co.uk	Vauxhall Astra Sport Hatch	90	(Turkey) Erkut Kızılırmak	1–6, 9–10
(United Kingdom) Team KWR	MG ZS	28	(United Kingdom) Jason Hughes	All
(United Kingdom) Robertshaw Racing	Honda Integra Type-R	32	(United Kingdom) Alan Taylor	All
(United Kingdom) In-Tune Racing	Honda Civic Type-R	33	(United Kingdom) Michael Doyle	All
(United Kingdom) TH Motorsport with JAG Racing	Honda Integra Type-R	55	(United Kingdom) John George	All
(United Kingdom) John Guest Racing	Honda Integra Type-R	77	(United Kingdom) Mike Jordan	All
(United Kingdom) John Guest Racing	Honda Integra Type-R	78	(United Kingdom) Andrew Jordan	All

- Team Halfords were neither a works or an independent entry.
- Team 48 Motorsport were on the official entry list but never raced.

== Calendar ==
All races were held in the United Kingdom. The 2008 season once again had ten race weekends with three BTCC rounds at each. A provisional calendar had been announced by series organisers.

Round		Circuit	Date	Pole position	Fastest lap	Winning driver	Winning team
1	R1	Brands Hatch (Indy)	30 March	(United Kingdom) Mat Jackson	(United Kingdom) Colin Turkington	(Italy) Fabrizio Giovanardi	VX Racing
1	R2	Brands Hatch (Indy)	30 March		(United Kingdom) Darren Turner	(Italy) Fabrizio Giovanardi	VX Racing
1	R3	Brands Hatch (Indy)	30 March		(United Kingdom) Mat Jackson	(United Kingdom) Colin Turkington	Team RAC
2	R4	Rockingham Motor Speedway	13 April	(United Kingdom) Gordon Shedden	(United Kingdom) Tom Onslow-Cole	(United Kingdom) Gordon Shedden	Team Halfords
2	R5	Rockingham Motor Speedway	13 April		(Italy) Fabrizio Giovanardi	(United Kingdom) Mat Jackson	BMW Dealer Team UK
2	R6	Rockingham Motor Speedway	13 April		(United Kingdom) Matt Neal	(United Kingdom) Matt Neal	VX Racing
3	R7	Donington Park (National)	4 May	(United Kingdom) Tom Onslow-Cole	(United Kingdom) Jason Plato	(United Kingdom) Jason Plato	SEAT Sport UK
3	R8	Donington Park (National)	4 May		(Italy) Fabrizio Giovanardi	(Italy) Fabrizio Giovanardi	VX Racing
3	R9	Donington Park (National)	4 May		(United Kingdom) Tom Onslow-Cole	(United Kingdom) Darren Turner	SEAT Sport UK
4	R10	Thruxton Circuit	18 May	(United Kingdom) Tom Onslow-Cole	(United Kingdom) Tom Onslow-Cole	(United Kingdom) Tom Onslow-Cole	VX Racing
4	R11	Thruxton Circuit	18 May		(Italy) Fabrizio Giovanardi	(United Kingdom) Tom Onslow-Cole	VX Racing
4	R12	Thruxton Circuit	18 May		(United Kingdom) Jason Plato	(United Kingdom) Jason Plato	SEAT Sport UK
5	R13	Croft Circuit	1 June	(United Kingdom) Darren Turner	(United Kingdom) Gordon Shedden	(United Kingdom) Colin Turkington	Team RAC
5	R14	Croft Circuit	1 June		(United Kingdom) Steven Kane	(United Kingdom) Colin Turkington	Team RAC
5	R15	Croft Circuit	1 June		(Italy) Fabrizio Giovanardi	(Italy) Fabrizio Giovanardi	VX Racing
6	R16	Snetterton Circuit	13 July	(United Kingdom) Jason Plato	(United Kingdom) Darren Turner	(United Kingdom) Jason Plato	SEAT Sport UK
6	R17	Snetterton Circuit	13 July		(Italy) Fabrizio Giovanardi	(United Kingdom) Jason Plato	SEAT Sport UK
6	R18	Snetterton Circuit	13 July		(Italy) Fabrizio Giovanardi	(United Kingdom) Mat Jackson	BMW Dealer Team UK
7	R19	Oulton Park (Island)	27 July	(United Kingdom) Jason Plato	(United Kingdom) Jason Plato	(United Kingdom) Jason Plato	SEAT Sport UK
7	R20	Oulton Park (Island)	27 July		(United Kingdom) Colin Turkington	(United Kingdom) Colin Turkington	Team RAC
7	R21	Oulton Park (Island)	27 July		(United Kingdom) Jason Plato	(United Kingdom) Gordon Shedden	Team Halfords
8	R22	Knockhill Circuit	17 August	(United Kingdom) Darren Turner	(United Kingdom) Jason Plato	(United Kingdom) Jason Plato	SEAT Sport UK
8	R23	Knockhill Circuit	17 August		(United Kingdom) Darren Turner	(United Kingdom) Jason Plato	SEAT Sport UK
8	R24	Knockhill Circuit	17 August		(United Kingdom) Darren Turner	(United Kingdom) Darren Turner	SEAT Sport UK
9	R25	Silverstone Circuit (National)	31 August	(United Kingdom) Jason Plato	(United Kingdom) Mat Jackson	(United Kingdom) Jason Plato	SEAT Sport UK
9	R26	Silverstone Circuit (National)	31 August		(Italy) Fabrizio Giovanardi	(Italy) Fabrizio Giovanardi	VX Racing
9	R27	Silverstone Circuit (National)	31 August		(United Kingdom) Jason Plato	(United Kingdom) Mat Jackson	BMW Dealer Team UK
10	R28	Brands Hatch (Indy)	21 September	(United Kingdom) Stephen Jelley	(United Kingdom) Steven Kane	(United Kingdom) Mat Jackson	BMW Dealer Team UK
10	R29	Brands Hatch (Indy)	21 September		(United Kingdom) Mat Jackson	(United Kingdom) Mat Jackson	BMW Dealer Team UK
10	R30	Brands Hatch (Indy)	21 September		(Italy) Fabrizio Giovanardi	(United Kingdom) Tom Chilton	Team Halfords

== Championship standings ==
Points system
**1st**	**2nd**	**3rd**	**4th**	**5th**	**6th**	**7th**	**8th**	**9th**	**10th**	Fastest lap	Lead a lap
15	12	10	8	6	5	4	3	2	1	1	1

- No driver may collect more than one "Lead a Lap" point per race no matter how many laps they lead.
- Race 1 polesitter receives 1 point.

=== Drivers Championship ===
Pos	Driver	BHI			ROC			DON			THR			CRO			SNE			OUL			KNO			SIL			BHI			Pts
1	(Italy) Fabrizio Giovanardi	1*	**1***	6	5	2*	5	8	1*	4	3	10*	3	4	5	1*	7	3	3	3	2	6	2	2	5	5	1*	3	14	DNS	11	262
2	(United Kingdom) Mat Jackson	**2***	4	2	6	1*	Ret	Ret	11	8	5	5	2	18*	2	5	15	7	1*	12	5	4	6	5	4	2	13*	1*	1*	**1***	4	226
3	(United Kingdom) Jason Plato	3	3	5	9	9	6	1*	**2***	3	DSQ	7	1*	12	8	12	**1***	**1***	Ret	**1***	**NC***	9	1*	**1***	Ret	**1***	**7***	5*	5	Ret	13	223
4	(United Kingdom) Colin Turkington	20	8	1*	16	6	7*	9*	13	12	2	2*	6	1*	**1***	8	5	2	6	4	1*	7	5	7	15	4	2	4	4	3	5	212
5	(United Kingdom) Matt Neal	5	7	3	3	11	1*	2	Ret	6	4	3	4	2	3	3	10	5	4	15	7	5	16	10	7	6	4	15	6	2	8	185
6	(United Kingdom) Tom Onslow-Cole	7	6	Ret	7	5	Ret	**3***	3	2	**1***	**1***	7	19	11	7	6	14	5	5	3	11	3	3	12	11	6	6*	9	8	**3**	170
7	(United Kingdom) Gordon Shedden	6	2	Ret	**1***	**4**	4	4	9*	**10**	13*	8	17*	3*	Ret	6	4	8	**Ret**	7	8	1*	4	4	8	13	8	11	13	9	9	144
8	(United Kingdom) Darren Turner	4	5	Ret	2	3*	Ret	19	4	1*	6	4	16	**15**	9	Ret	2	19*	16	6	Ret	16	**Ret**	8	1*	3	Ret	19	7	Ret	12	133
9	(United Kingdom) Adam Jones	10	10	18	4	8	**3**	7	7	7	8	6	5	8	6	2	13	10	DSQ	8	6	2	8	12	10	8	3	2	11	11	Ret	119
10	(United Kingdom) Tom Chilton	9	Ret	7	8	7	2	Ret	5	5	7	12	Ret	Ret	14	4	3	15	7	2	11	Ret	10	11	6	12	Ret	9	8	6	1*	107
11	(United Kingdom) Steven Kane	8	Ret	DNS	10	10	13	6	12	16	12	13	9	7	Ret	Ret	8	6	2	9	4	Ret	12	14	9	Ret	5	12	2	5	2	86
12	(United Kingdom) Rob Collard	12	Ret	11	13	12	8	Ret	DNS	Ret	14	14	11	5	4	Ret*	9	4	9	10	Ret	8	7	6	2	16	9	7	3	4	6	84
13	(United Kingdom) Andrew Jordan	15	14	9	Ret	Ret	Ret	5	6	Ret	10	9	**Ret**	10	Ret	10	Ret	Ret	Ret	13	9	**3***	9	9	**3**	9	Ret	20	10	7	7	56
14	(United Kingdom) Mike Jordan	13	9	**4**	Ret	Ret	9	10	Ret	9	9	15	8	6	7	**Ret**	11	9	Ret	Ret	DNS	DNS	11	13	11	Ret	10	**Ret**	12	10	10	34
15	(United Kingdom) Stephen Jelley	14	11	10	11	15	11	Ret	Ret	13	11	11	Ret	Ret	10	9	12	11	8	11	10	15	13	15	13	7	Ret	10	**Ret**	12	Ret	14
16	(United Kingdom) Michael Doyle	NC	18	15	20	Ret	Ret	15	Ret	DNS	15	Ret	DNS	9	Ret	DNS	Ret	13	11	16	Ret	13	Ret	Ret	Ret	15	Ret	8	15	Ret	DNS	5
17	(United Kingdom) Matt Allison	11	12	8	12	Ret	DNS	Ret	DNS	DNS																						3
18	(United Kingdom) Chris Stockton	Ret	DNS	DNS	DNS	DNS	DNS	13	8	Ret	19	Ret	Ret	11	18	Ret				Ret	14	Ret	Ret	17	17	Ret	DNS	DNS	Ret	DNS	DNS	3
19	(United Kingdom) Harry Vaulkhard	18	15	14	Ret	13	14	12	14	11	Ret	16	10	13	13	11	14	17	15	14	12	12	Ret	16	14	10	12	13	16	13	14	2
20	(United Kingdom) Jason Hughes	16	13	13	14	14	15	11	10	14	16	18	13	14	12	DNS	16	12	12	Ret	15	10	Ret	Ret	16	14	11	Ret	Ret	14	15	2
21	(United Kingdom) John George	17	19	12	15	16	Ret	Ret	DNS	DNS	20	NC	12	17	17	Ret	17	16	10	17	Ret	Ret	14	20	19	19	15	14	Ret	15	Ret	1
22	(Turkey) Erkut Kızılırmak	19	16	17	17	18	10	16	Ret	DNS	22	19	14	16	15	13	18	Ret	13							18	DNS	17	18	17	Ret	1
23	(United Kingdom) Martyn Bell	Ret	17	16	18	17	12	14	Ret	Ret	17	Ret	15	20	16	Ret	Ret	18	14	18	13	14	Ret	18	18	17	14	18	17	16	Ret	0
24	(United Kingdom) Alan Taylor	21	20	Ret	21	19	DNS	18	Ret	DNS	21	Ret	Ret	Ret	DNS	DNS	Ret	Ret	Ret	NC	Ret	Ret	15	19	20	Ret	DNS	16	19	DNS	16	0
25	(United Kingdom) Stuart Oliver	Ret	Ret	DNS	19	Ret	Ret	17	Ret	15				21	Ret	DNS																0
26	(United Kingdom) Gareth Howell										18	17	Ret							Ret	DNS	DNS										0
Pos	Driver	BHI			ROC			DON			THR			CRO			SNE			OUL			KNO			SIL			BHI			Pts
Sources:

- Note: **bold** signifies pole position (1 point given in first race only, and race 2 and 3 poles are based on race results), italics signifies fastest lap (1 point given all races) and * signifies at least one lap in the lead (1 point given all races).

=== Manufacturers Championship ===
Pos	Manufacturer	BHI			ROC			DON			THR			CRO			SNE			OUL			KNO			SIL			BHI			Pts
1	Vauxhall / VX Racing	1	1	3	3	2	1	2	1	4	1	1	3	2	3	1	6	3	3	3	2	5	2	2	5	6	4	6	6	2	3	**697**
1	Vauxhall / VX Racing	5	6	6	5	11	5	3	Ret	6	3	10	7	4	5	3	7	5	4	15	7	6	16	10	7	11	6	15	9	8	8	**697**
2	SEAT / SEAT Sport UK	3	3	5	2	3	6	1	2	1	6	4	1	12	8	12	1	1	16	1	NC	9	1	1	1	1	7	5	5	Ret	12	**545**
2	SEAT / SEAT Sport UK	4	5	Ret	9	9	Ret	19	4	3	DSQ	7	16	15	9	Ret	2	19	Ret	6	Ret	16	Ret	8	Ret	3	Ret	19	7	Ret	13	**545**

=== Teams Championship ===
Pos	Team	BHI			ROC			DON			THR			CRO			SNE			OUL			KNO			SIL			BHI			Pts
1	VX Racing	1	1	3	3	2	1	2	1	2	1	1	3	2	3	1	6	3	3	3	2	5	2	2	5	5	1	3	6	2	3	**537**
1	VX Racing	5	6	6	5	5	5	3	3	4	3	3	4	4	5	3	7	5	4	5	3	6	3	3	7	6	4	6	9	8	8	**537**
2	SEAT Sport UK	3	3	5	2	3	6	1	2	1	6	4	1	12	8	12	1	1	16	1	NC	9	1	1	1	1	7	5	5	Ret	12	**328**
2	SEAT Sport UK	4	5	Ret	9	9	Ret	19	4	3	DSQ	7	16	15	9	Ret	2	19	Ret	6	Ret	16	Ret	8	Ret	3	Ret	19	7	Ret	13	**328**
3	Team Halfords	6	2	6	1	4	2	4	5	5	7	8	17	3	14	4	3	8	7	2	8	1	4	4	6	12	8	9	8	6	1	**231*****
3	Team Halfords	9	Ret	Ret	8	7	4	Ret	9	10	13	12	Ret	Ret	Ret	6	4	15	Ret	7	11	Ret	10	11	8	13	Ret	11	13	9	9	**231*****
4	Team RAC	14	8	1	11	6	7	9	13	12	2	2	6	1	1	8	5	2	6	4	1	7	5	7	13	4	2	4	4	3	5	**227**
4	Team RAC	20	11	10	16	15	11	Ret	Ret	13	11	11	Ret	Ret	10	9	12	11	8	11	10	15	13	15	15	7	Ret	10	Ret	12	Ret	**227**
5	BMW Dealer Team UK	2	4	2	6	1	Ret	Ret	11	8	5	5	2	18	2	5	15	7	1	12	5	4	6	5	4	2	13	1	1	1	4	**217**
6	Motorbase Performance	8	Ret	11	10	10	8	6	12	16	12	13	9	5	4	Ret	8	4	2	9	4	8	7	6	2	16	5	7	2	4	2	**173**
6	Motorbase Performance	12	Ret	DNS	13	12	13	Ret	DNS	Ret	14	14	11	7	Ret	Ret	9	6	9	10	Ret	Ret	12	14	9	Ret	9	12	3	5	6	**173**
7	Team Air Cool	10	10	18	4	8	3	7	7	7	8	6	5	8	6	2	13	10	DSQ	8	6	2	8	12	10	8	3	2	11	11	Ret	**103*****
8	Team Eurotech	13	9	4	Ret	Ret	9	5	6	9	9	9	8	6	7	10	11	9	Ret	13	9	3	9	9	3	9	10	20	10	7	7	**89****
8	Team Eurotech	15	14	9	Ret	Ret	Ret	10	Ret	Ret	10	15	Ret	10	Ret	Ret	Ret	Ret	Ret	Ret	DNS	DNS	11	13	11	Ret	Ret	Ret	12	10	10	**89****
9	Robertshaw Racing	11	12	8	12	13	14	12	14	11	21	16	10	13	13	11	14	17	15	14	12	12	15	16	14	10	12	13	16	13	14	**9**
9	Robertshaw Racing	18	15	14	21	19	DNS	18	Ret	DNS	Ret	Ret	Ret	Ret	DNS	DNS	Ret	Ret	Ret	NC	Ret	Ret	Ret	19	20	Ret	DNS	16	19	DNS	16	**9**
10	In-Tune Racing	NC	18	15	20	Ret	Ret	15	Ret	DNS	15	Ret	DNS	9	Ret	DNS	Ret	13	11	16	Ret	13	Ret	Ret	Ret	15	Ret	8	15	Ret	DNS	**6**
11	Team KWR	16	13	13	14	14	15	11	10	14	16	18	13	14	12	DNS	16	12	12	Ret	15	10	Ret	Ret	16	14	11	Ret	Ret	14	15	**4**
12	TH Motorsport	17	19	12	15	16	Ret	Ret	DNS	DNS	20	NC	12	17	17	Ret	17	16	10	17	Ret	Ret	14	20	19	19	15	14	Ret	15	Ret	**2**
13	Arkas Racing	19	16	16	17	17	10	14	Ret	Ret	17	19	14	16	15	13	18	18	13	18	13	14	Ret	18	18	17	14	13	17	16	Ret	**1**
13	Arkas Racing	Ret	17	17	18	18	12	16	Ret	DNS	22	Ret	15	20	16	Ret	Ret	Ret	14							18	DNS	18	18	17	Ret	**1**
14	BTC Racing	Ret	Ret	DNS	19	Ret	Ret	13	8	15	18	17	Ret	11	18	Ret				Ret	14	Ret	Ret	17	17	Ret	DNS	DNS	Ret	DNS	DNS	**0***
14	BTC Racing	Ret	DNS	DNS	DNS	DNS	DNS	17	Ret	Ret	19	Ret	DNS	21	Ret	DNS				Ret	DNS	DNS										**0***
Pos	Team	BHI			ROC			DON			THR			CRO			SNE			OUL			KNO			SIL			BHI			Pts

* – BTC Racing lose all points for three changes of engine.
** – Team Eurotech lose 10 points for three changes of engine.
*** – Team Air Cool and Team Halfords lose 20 points for four changes of engine.

=== Independents Trophy ===
Pos	Driver	BHI			ROC			DON			THR			CRO			SNE			OUL			KNO			SIL			BHI			Pts
1	(United Kingdom) Colin Turkington	20	8	1	16	6	7	**9**	13	12	**2**	**2**	6	**1**	**1**	8	**5**	**2**	6	**4**	**1**	7	**5**	**7**	15	**4**	2	4	4	3	5	323
2	(United Kingdom) Mat Jackson	**2**	**4**	2	6	1	Ret	Ret	11	8	5	5	2	18	2	5	15	7	**1**	12	5	4	6	5	4	2	**13**	1	1	**1**	4	313
3	(United Kingdom) Adam Jones	10	10	18	**4**	**8**	**3**	7	7	7	8	6	5	8	6	**2**	13	10	DSQ	8	6	2	8	12	10	8	3	2	11	11	Ret	262
4	(United Kingdom) Steven Kane	8	Ret	DNS	10	10	13	6	12	16	12	13	9	7	Ret	Ret	8	6	2	9	4	Ret	12	14	9	Ret	5	12	2	5	2	196
5	(United Kingdom) Rob Collard	12	Ret	11	13	12	8	Ret	DNS	Ret	14	14	11	5	4	Ret	9	4	9	10	Ret	8	7	6	2	16	9	7	3	4	6	189
6	(United Kingdom) Andrew Jordan	15	14	9	Ret	Ret	Ret	5	**6**	Ret	10	9	**Ret**	10	Ret	10	Ret	Ret	Ret	13	9	**3**	9	9	**3**	9	Ret	20	10	7	**7**	138
7	(United Kingdom) Mike Jordan	13	9	**4**	Ret	Ret	9	10	Ret	9	9	15	8	6	7	Ret	11	9	Ret	Ret	DNS	DNS	11	13	11	Ret	10	**Ret**	12	10	10	133
8	(United Kingdom) Stephen Jelley	14	11	10	11	15	11	Ret	Ret	13	11	11	Ret	Ret	10	9	12	11	8	11	10	15	13	15	13	7	Ret	10	**Ret**	12	Ret	118
9	(United Kingdom) Harry Vaulkhard	18	15	14	Ret	13	14	12	14	11	Ret	16	10	13	13	11	14	17	15	14	12	12	Ret	16	14	10	12	13	16	13	14	82
10	(United Kingdom) Jason Hughes	16	13	13	14	14	15	11	10	14	16	18	13	14	12	DNS	16	12	12	Ret	15	10	Ret	Ret	16	14	11	Ret	Ret	14	15	70
11	(United Kingdom) Michael Doyle	NC	18	15	20	Ret	Ret	15	Ret	DNS	15	Ret	DNS	9	Ret	DNS	Ret	13	11	16	Ret	13	Ret	Ret	Ret	15	Ret	8	15	Ret	DNS	31
12	(United Kingdom) Matt Allison	11	12	8	12	Ret	DNS	Ret	DNS	DNS																						27
13	(United Kingdom) John George	17	19	12	15	16	Ret	Ret	DNS	DNS	20	NC	12	17	17	Ret	17	16	10	17	Ret	Ret	14	20	19	19	15	14	Ret	15	Ret	25
14	(United Kingdom) Chris Stockton	Ret	DNS	DNS	DNS	DNS	DNS	13	8	**Ret**	19	Ret	Ret	11	18	Ret				Ret	14	Ret	Ret	17	17	Ret	DNS	DNS	Ret	DNS	DNS	19
15	(United Kingdom) Martyn Bell	Ret	17	16	18	17	12	14	Ret	Ret	17	Ret	15	20	16	Ret	Ret	18	14	18	13	14	Ret	18	18	17	14	18	17	16	Ret	18
16	(Turkey) Erkut Kızılırmak	19	16	17	17	18	10	16	Ret	DNS	22	19	14	16	15	13	18	Ret	13							18	DNS	17	18	17	Ret	17
17	(United Kingdom) Alan Taylor	21	20	Ret	21	19	DNS	18	Ret	DNS	21	Ret	Ret	Ret	DNS	DNS	Ret	Ret	Ret	NC	Ret	Ret	15	19	20	Ret	DNS	16	19	DNS	16	4
18	(United Kingdom) Stuart Oliver	Ret	Ret	DNS	19	Ret	Ret	17	Ret	15				21	Ret	DNS																3
19	(United Kingdom) Gareth Howell										18	17	Ret							Ret	DNS	DNS										1
Pos	Driver	BHI			ROC			DON			THR			CRO			SNE			OUL			KNO			SIL			BHI			Pts

=== Independent Teams Trophy ===
Pos	Team	BHI			ROC			DON			THR			CRO			SNE			OUL			KNO			SIL			BHI			Pts
1	Team RAC	14	8	1	11	6	7	9	13	12	2	2	6	1	1	8	5	2	6	4	1	7	5	7	13	4	2	4	4	3	5	**340**
2	BMW Dealer Team UK	2	4	2	6	1	Ret	Ret	11	8	5	5	2	18	2	5	15	7	1	12	5	4	6	5	4	2	13	1	1	1	4	**321**
3	Motorbase Performance	8	Ret	11	10	10	8	6	12	16	12	13	9	5	4	Ret	8	4	2	9	4	8	7	6	2	16	5	7	2	4	2	**265**
4	Team Air Cool	10	10	18	4	8	3	7	7	7	8	6	5	8	6	2	13	10	DSQ	8	6	2	8	12	10	8	3	2	11	11	Ret	**256****
5	Team Eurotech	13	9	4	Ret	Ret	9	5	6	9	9	9	8	6	7	10	11	9	Ret	13	9	3	9	9	3	9	10	20	10	7	7	**222***
6	Robertshaw Racing	11	12	8	12	13	14	12	14	11	21	16	10	13	13	11	14	17	15	14	12	12	15	16	14	10	12	13	16	13	14	**149**
7	Team KWR	16	13	13	14	14	15	11	10	14	16	18	13	14	12	DNS	16	12	12	Ret	15	10	Ret	Ret	16	14	11	Ret	Ret	14	15	**109**
8	Arkas Racing	19	16	16	17	17	10	14	Ret	Ret	17	19	14	16	15	13	18	18	13	18	13	14	Ret	18	18	17	14	17	17	16	Ret	**73**
9	TH Motorsport	17	19	12	15	16	Ret	Ret	DNS	DNS	20	NC	12	17	17	Ret	17	16	10	17	Ret	Ret	14	20	19	19	15	14	Ret	15	Ret	**62**
10	In-Tune Racing	NC	18	15	20	Ret	Ret	15	Ret	DNS	15	Ret	DNS	9	Ret	DNS	Ret	13	11	16	Ret	13	Ret	Ret	Ret	15	Ret	8	15	Ret	DNS	**52**
11	BTC Racing	Ret	Ret	DNS	19	Ret	Ret	13	8	15	18	17	Ret	11	18	Ret				Ret	14	Ret	Ret	17	17	Ret	DNS	DNS	Ret	DNS	DNS	**32***
Pos	Team	BHI			ROC			DON			THR			CRO			SNE			OUL			KNO			SIL			BHI			Pts

* – BTC Racing & Team Eurotech lose 10 points for three changes of engine.
** – Team Air Cool lose 20 points for four changes of engine.
