= TH Motorsport =

(United Kingdom) TH Motorsport
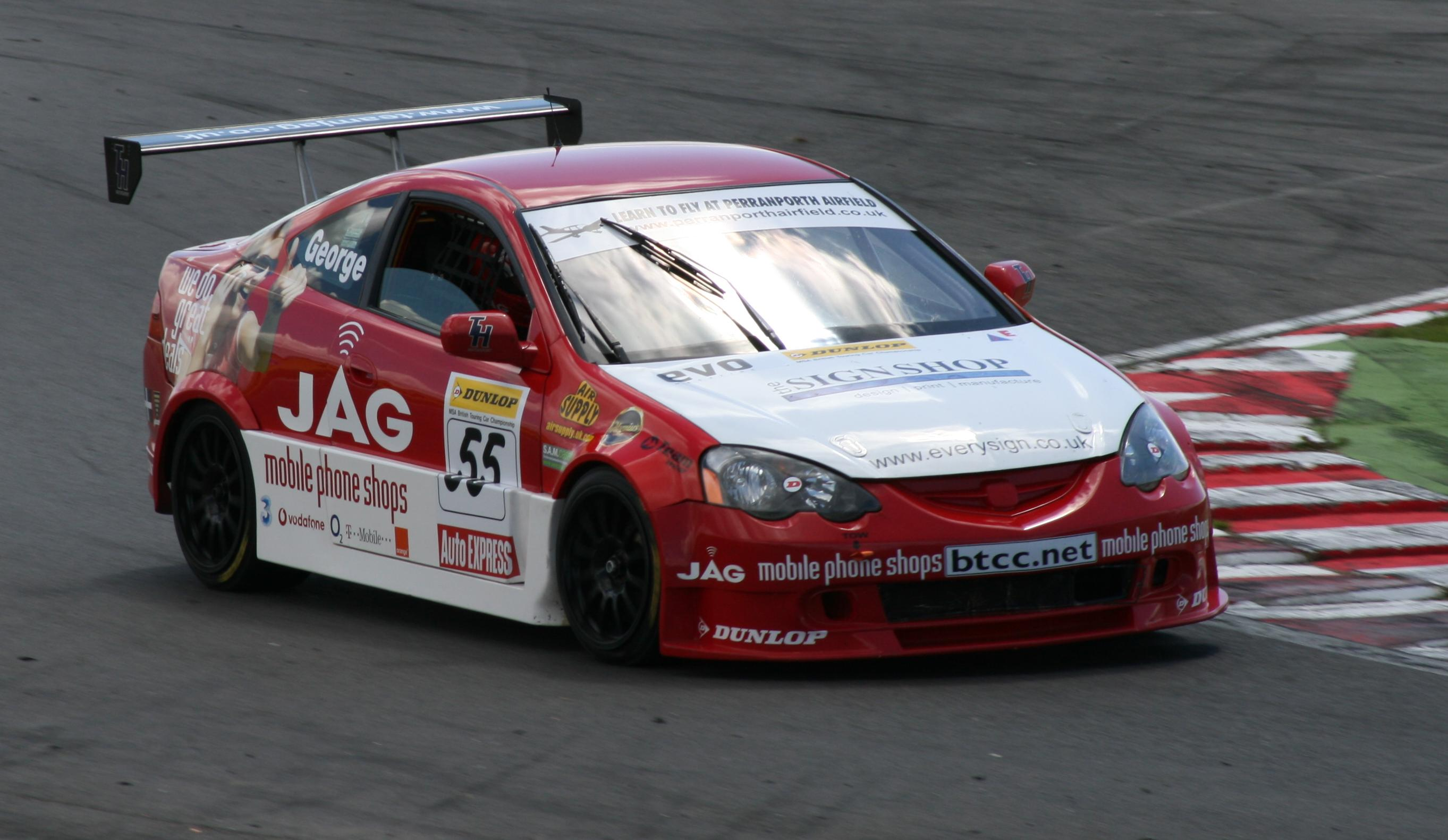
- Founded: 1997
- Team principal(s): Trevor Humphrey
- Current series: Britcar Dunlop Production GTN Championship
- Former series: BTCC; Dunlop SportMaxx Production Cup; Volkswagen Racing Cup

TH Motorsport is a British motorsports team based in Watford. It was founded in 1997 by Trevor Humphrey. Initially entering in various one make national series and Rally events, the team is best known for competing in the British Touring Car Championship and Britcar Championship.

== BTCC ==
=== Proton Satria GTI (2001) ===
TH Motorsport first entered the BTCC in 2001. Steve Wood drove a team-built Production Class Proton Satria GTI, in selected rounds.

=== Mitsubishi Carisma (2002) ===
In 2002, Wood switched to a Mitsubishi Carisma, again just competing in selected rounds.

=== Honda Civic (2004) ===
The team managed John George's 2004 BTCC campaign with a Mardi Gras Motorsport run LPG-powered Honda Civic.

=== Honda Integra (2007-2009) ===
TH Motorsport and John George returned to the BTCC in 2007, with a former Team Dynamics BTC-T Honda Integra Type R running under the TH Motorsport Racing with JAG banner. A troubled season in 2008 ended with George writing off the Integra in the final round at Brands Hatch, after a crash with the SEAT León of Darren Turner. Another Integra was acquired, formerly run by David Pinkney, that was used by George in the 2009 season. At the tail end of the season a Honda Civic was entered for teenage debutant Matt Hamilton.

=== Skoda Octavia (2012- ) ===
TH Motorsport and Matt Hamilton planned to return to the BTCC in 2012, running a NGTC Skoda Octavia VRS. However, the project was eventually cancelled.
