= Michael Doyle (racing driver) =

British racing driver (born 1987)

- Nationality: (United Kingdom) British
- Born: 18 June 1987 (age 39) Glasgow, Scotland

Previous series
- 2008: British Touring Car Championship

Michael Doyle (born 18 June 1987 in Glasgow) is a British racing driver who competed in the British Touring Car Championship in 2008. Doyle's team was family-owned, and part of a garage services business which he worked for during the week.

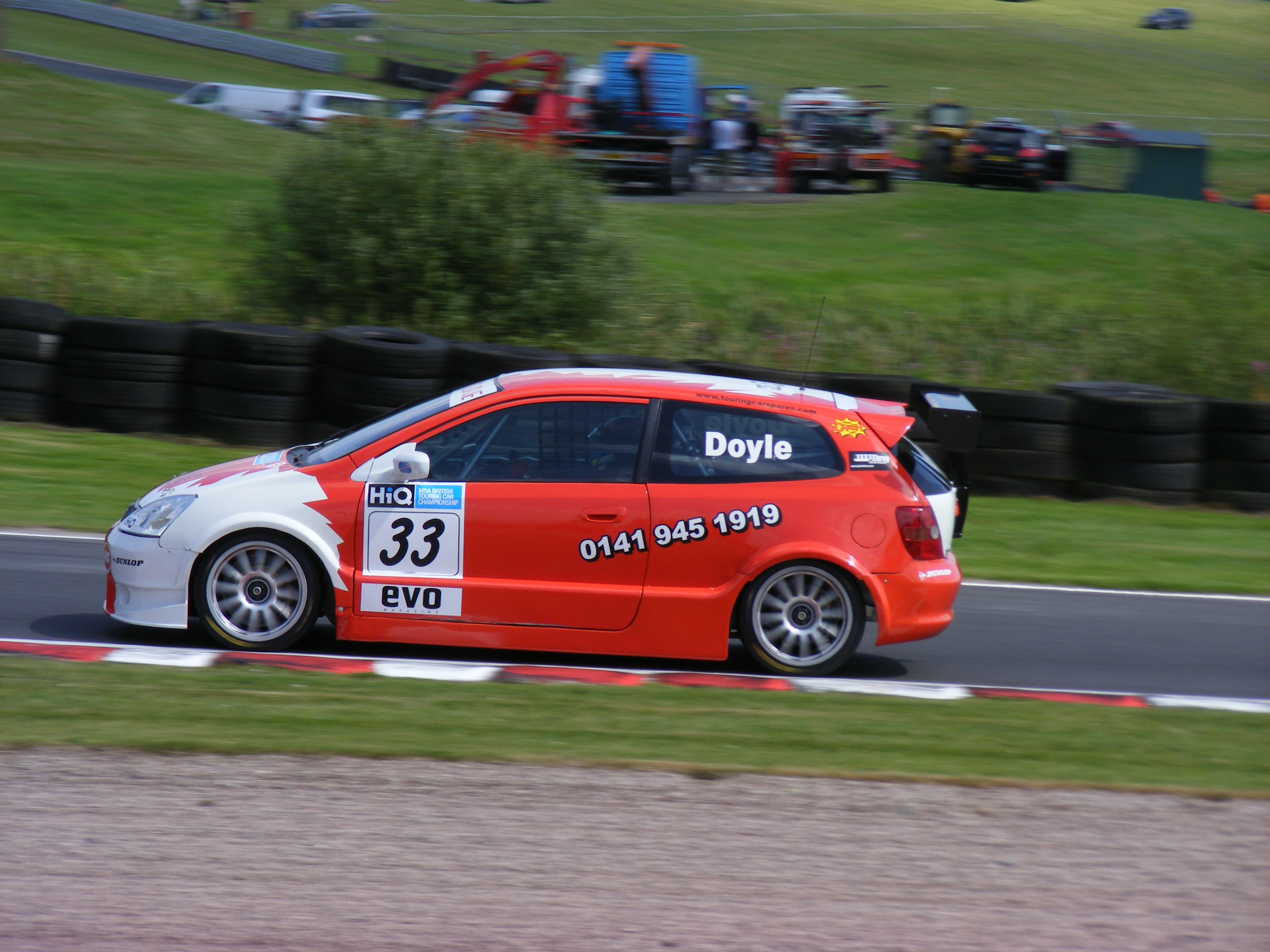
Doyle driving the In-Tune Racing Honda Civic at Oulton Park during the 2008 British Touring Car Championship season.

Doyle was not among the front-runners in his aged Honda Civic, and was not among the top-ten non-works drivers to finish until race 7 at Donington Park. He ran tenth for part of race 6 at Rockingham, before spinning out. His first points came in race 13 at Croft, which was stopped early due to rain.

Doyle's best result came at Silverstone during a wet race 3, in conditions that he thrives in. He finished eighth overall, passing among others both Tom Chilton and Gordon Shedden in the new style Honda Civic run by Team Dynamics. Doyle's season was constantly hampered with gearbox problems causing various race retirements when top-ten results were looking certain. Since his season in the BTCC in 2008, Doyle has been hard at work at college obtaining diplomas in both sports remedial massage and personal training as well as a brief stint in the Ginetta GT supercup in 2011 with Beacon Racing, competing in three rounds.

== Racing history ==
After a career in karts (including two Scottish titles in 2002), Doyle contested the 2004 Renault Clio Winter Series. From 2005 to 2007, Doyle raced in the full Renault Clio Cup, which supports the BTCC. He finished fourth overall in 2006, and took a win at Snetterton in 2007. He also took a victory in the equivalent Italian series, in a race at Spa-Francorchamps, Belgium.

== Racing record ==
=== Complete British Touring Car Championship results ===
(key) (Races in bold indicate pole position - 1 point awarded in first race) (Races in italics indicate fastest lap - 1 point awarded all races) (* signifies that driver lead race for at least one lap - 1 point awarded all races)

Year	Team	Car	1	2	3	4	5	6	7	8	9	10	11	12	13	14	15	16	17	18	19	20	21	22	23	24	25	26	27	28	29	30	DC	Pts
2008	In-Tune Racing	Honda Civic Type-R	BRH; 1 NC	BRH; 2; 18	BRH; 3; 15	ROC; 1; 20	ROC; 2 Ret	ROC; 3 Ret	DON; 1; 15	DON; 2 Ret	DON; 3 DNS	THR; 1; 15	THR; 2 Ret	THR; 3 DNS	CRO; 1; 9	CRO; 2 Ret	CRO; 3 DNS	SNE; 1 Ret	SNE; 2; 13	SNE; 3; 11	OUL; 1; 16	OUL; 2 Ret	OUL; 3; 13	KNO; 1 Ret	KNO; 2 Ret	KNO; 3 Ret	SIL; 1; 15	SIL; 2 Ret	SIL; 3; 8	BRH; 1; 15	BRH; 2 Ret	BRH; 3 DNS	**16th**	**5**
