= Paul O'Neill (racing driver) =

British former racing driver and commentator (born 1979)

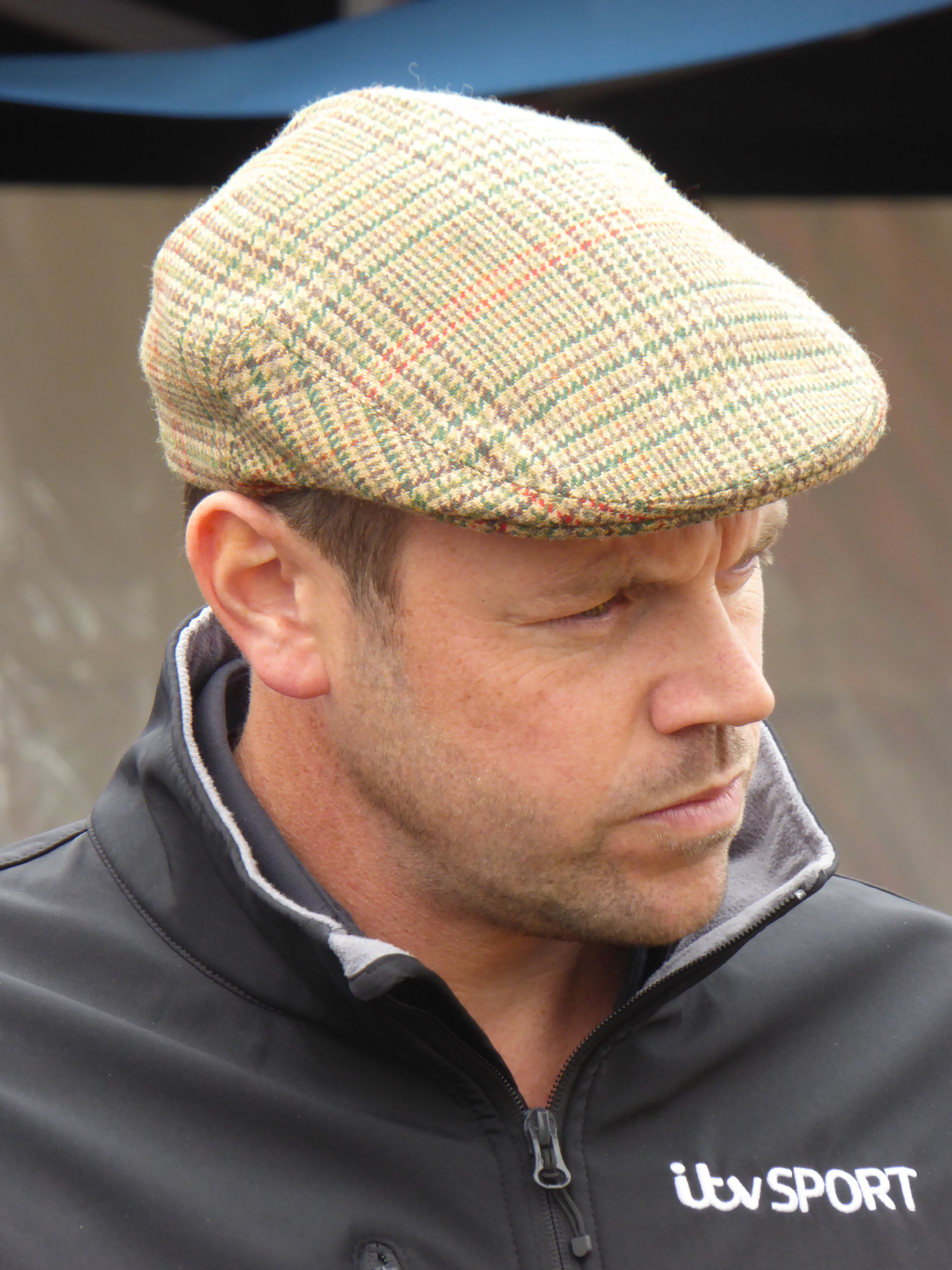
- O'Neill in 2017
- Nationality: (United Kingdom) British
- Born: 31 December 1979 (age 46) Widnes, Cheshire, England
- Relatives: Melanie C (half-sister)

Mini Challenge UK career
- Debut season: 2018
- Current team: MINI UK VIP
- Starts: 3
- Wins: 0
- Poles: 0
- Fastest laps: 0
- Best finish: NC in 2018

Previous series
- 2014 2014 2014 2014–15 2012 2009–13 2009 2008 2007–08 2006 2006, 2008 2002–03, 2006–07 2001 1999–2000 1999: British GT – GT4; BMW Compact Cup; Volkswagen Racing Cup; Mazda MX-5 SuperCup; Radical UK Cup; BTCC; Dunlop Sport Maxx Cup; Ginetta G50 Cup; British GT – GT3; Ginetta G20 Challenge; Porsche Carrera Cup Great Britain; BTCC; BTCC – Production; MGF Cup; National Saloon Cup

Paul O'Neill (born 31 December 1979) is a British former racing driver and commentator who currently serves as one of ITV Sport's lead commentators on the British Touring Car Championship and ToCA package, alongside Nicki Shields, Jade Edwards, Tim Harvey and David Addison. O'Neill is half-siblings with former Spice Girls member Melanie C, who helped him discover his diabetes diagnosis.

== Career ==
=== Early years ===
Born in Widnes, Cheshire, O'Neill was originally attracted to racing after seeing Nigel Mansell win the 1987 British Grand Prix, but did not pursue a career initially, studying for A-levels but not completing them. After attending the Jim Russell Racing School, he began racing in the MGF cup in 1999 and 2000, before entering the production class of the British Touring Car Championship in 2001. He did not win a race, but took three class podiums and two class poles en route to eighth in the class.

=== British Touring Car Championship ===
==== Vauxhall (2002–2003) ====
O'Neill's efforts in the production class were enough to earn him a drive with Team Egg Sport in their semi-works Touring Class Vauxhall Astra Coupe for 2002. He was eighth in this championship, and then stepped up to the factory Vauxhall team for 2003, finishing fourth in the series.

==== Tech-Speed and Motorbase (2004–2007) ====
O'Neill was not expected to retain the drive for 2004, but early that year he discovered that he had diabetes, and his racing licence was temporarily withdrawn. Once the condition was under control he did not immediately resume racing, instead helping his former team Tech-Speed prepare their bio-ethanol powered car, tutoring driver Fiona Leggate and fulfilling the post of race engineer. He also raced the guest car in the Porsche Carrera Cup at Oulton Park in 2006 along with some Ginettas Racing.

Following Leggate's premature departure from Tech-Speed, O'Neill signed for the team to compete in the final two race weekends of the 2006 British Touring Car Championship season. This car is powered by sugar beet, which he is not permitted to eat because of his diabetes. He scored a tenth place in his first race back. Notably, while most drivers at this September Brands Hatch meeting were slower than they had been at the April meeting due to different track conditions, O'Neill was over a second faster than Leggate's time from that meeting in some practice sessions. At Silverstone he was hampered by engine issues in practice but took two top-ten finishes on raceday. He did not keep the drive for 2007, Techspeed opting instead to unite with the Turkish Arkas team and run Erkut Kızılırmak. He competed in the final round of 2007 with Motorbase Performance in a SEAT Toledo.

==== Tech-Speed (2009–2011) ====
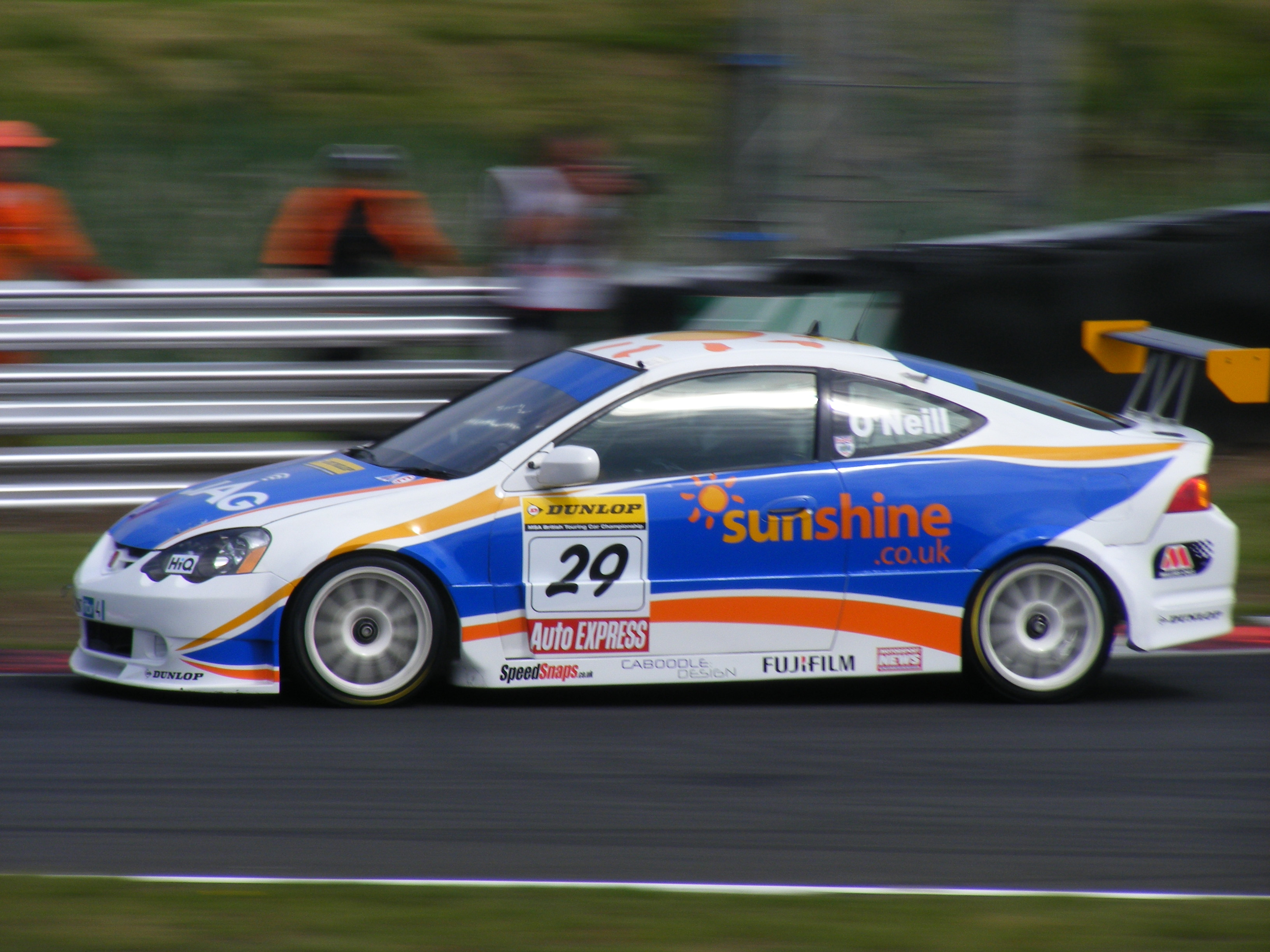
O'Neill driving the Tech-Speed Motorsport Honda Integra at Oulton Park during the 2010 British Touring Car Championship season.

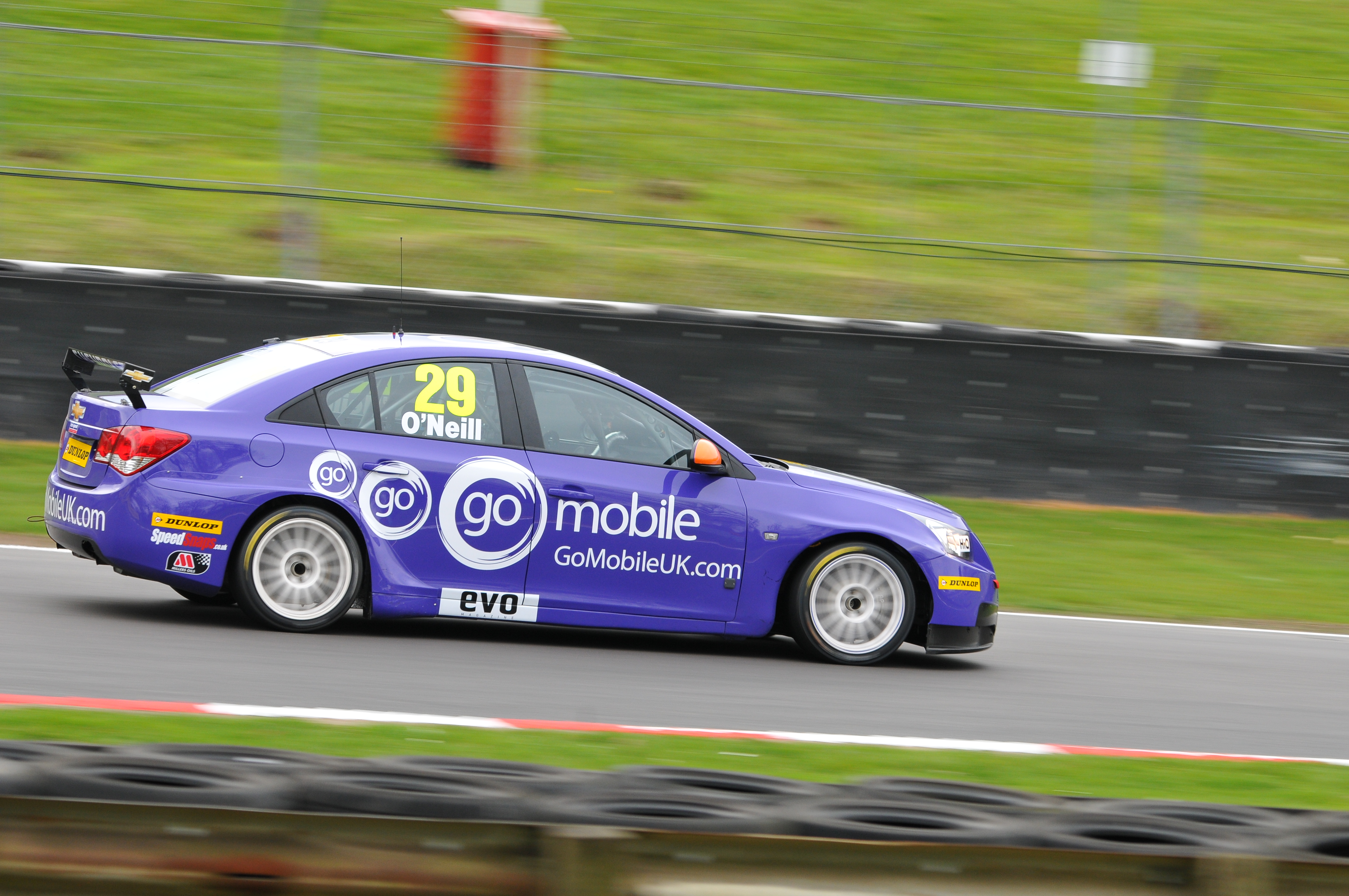
O'Neill driving the Tech-Speed Motorsport Chevrolet Cruze at Brands Hatch during the 2011 British Touring Car Championship season.

O'Neill returned to Tech-Speed for the 2009 British Touring Car Championship season, partnering Martyn Bell in a two-car team. He scored a third place at Snetterton, and as of round seven at Knockhill he had scored points in 11 successive races. He was placed tenth in the drivers championship.

O'Neill remained with Tech-Speed for the 2010 & 2011 seasons, now joined by John George. He finished ninth (2010) and tenth (2011) claiming five podiums.

==== Speedworks Motorsport (2012) ====
O'Neill was without a regular drive at the start of the 2012 season, but drove the Speedworks Motorsport Toyota Avensis at Croft and Knockhill, deputising for the team's regular driver Tony Hughes, who was unable to take part due to his business commitments. He was unable to secure the finances required to stay with the team for 2013.

==== Tony Gilham Racing (2013) ====
Having been without a drive since the start of the 2013 season, O'Neill joined Tony Gilham Racing for the Knockhill round driving an RCIB Insurance Racing Vauxhall Insignia when regular driver Jack Goff decided to miss the round.

=== British GT Championship ===
O'Neill entered the Croft round of the British GT Championship towards the end of 2007 alongside co-driver Steve Clark in a Team RPM Viper Competition Coupe GT3. He returned to the series in 2008 with Team RPM driving a Viper Competition Coupe in the GT3 class. He competed in the first eight races of the season, including a win in the second race at Rockingham. He finished the season 16th in the GT3 standings.

=== Other activities ===
O'Neill is a motor racing instructor at the Oulton Park circuit in Cheshire.

Since 2012, O'Neill has been part of the presenting team for the ITV4 television coverage of the BTCC.

In 2013, O'Neill appeared on the British television series Top Gear, driving a Volkswagen Beetle in a taxi race.

In 2014, O'Neill appeared in series 2 of Classic Car Rescue, driving and valuing the restored cars. He also competed in one round of the Mazda MX-5 SuperCup at Oulton Park, taking two wins.

O'Neill is a Patron of The Sporting Memories Foundation and on 10 September 2017 completed the Great North Run to raise funds for the charity.

O'Neill is also a driver coach for Britcar class champion Tim Docker. O'Neill volunteered as a marshal at the seventh round of the Britcar Endurance Championship at Oulton Park. O'Neill was the driver of the car for a new world record set by golfer Marcus Armitage for the longest drive into a moving car.

O'Neill is the co-founder of 29 Productions - a bespoke multi camera streaming and production company.

Since 2021, O'Neill has appeared on four series of Celebrity Gogglebox along with his half-sister Melanie C.

== Racing record ==
=== Complete British Touring Car Championship results ===
(key) Races in bold indicate pole position (1 point awarded – 2001–2002 all races, 2003–present just for first race, 2001 in class) Races in italics indicate fastest lap (1 point awarded all races, 2001 in class) * signifies that driver lead race for at least one lap (1 point given – 2001–2002 just for feature race, 2003–present all races, 2001 in class)

Year	Team	Car	Class	1	2	3	4	5	6	7	8	9	10	11	12	13	14	15	16	17	18	19	20	21	22	23	24	25	26	27	28	29	30	Pen.	Pos	Pts	Class
2001	Tech-Speed Motorsport	Peugeot 306 GTi	P	BRH; 1 Ret†	BRH; 2 ovr:12 cls:6	THR; 1 Ret	THR; 2 Ret	OUL; 1 Ret	OUL; 2 DNS	SIL; 1 ovr:7 cls:3	SIL; 2 ovr:12 cls:5	MON; 1 Ret	MON; 2 ovr:6 cls:2	DON; 1 Ret	DON; 2 Ret	KNO; 1 ovr:12 cls:7	KNO; 2 ovr:11 cls:7	SNE; 1 ovr:13 cls:9	SNE; 2 Ret	CRO; 1 ovr:10 cls:6	CRO; 2 Ret	OUL; 1 Ret	OUL; 2 DNS	SIL; 1 Ret	SIL; 2 ovr:11 cls:3	DON; 1 ovr:8 cls:5	DON; 2 DNS	**BRH**; **1** ovr:19 cls:11	**BRH**; **2** ovr:9 cls:5						N/A	74	8th
2002	egg:sport	Vauxhall Astra Coupé	T	BRH; 1 Ret	BRH; 2 Ret	OUL; 1 Ret	OUL; 2 ovr:1* cls:1	THR; 1 ovr:8 cls:8	THR; 2 ovr:7 cls:7	SIL; 1 ovr:2 cls:2	SIL; 2 ovr:4* cls:4	MON; 1 ovr:4 cls:4	MON; 2 ovr:5* cls:5	CRO; 1 Ret	CRO; 2 ovr:6* cls:6	SNE; 1 ovr:11 cls:11	SNE; 2 ovr:16 cls:11	KNO; 1 ovr:6 cls:6	KNO; 2 ovr:5* cls:5	BRH; 1 ovr:10 cls:10	BRH; 2 ovr:4 cls:4	DON; 1 Ret	DON; 2 ovr:5 cls:5											−15	8th	77	
2003	VX Racing	Vauxhall Astra Coupé	T	MON; 1 Ret	MON; 2 ovr:4 cls:4	BRH; 1 ovr:3* cls:3	BRH; 2 ovr:3 cls:3	THR; 1 ovr:3 cls:3	THR; 2 ovr:3* cls:3	SIL; 1 ovr:7 cls:7	SIL; 2 ovr:5* cls:5	ROC; 1 ovr:10 cls:10	ROC; 2 ovr:6* cls:6	CRO; 1 ovr:3 cls:3	CRO; 2 ovr:6* cls:6	SNE; 1 ovr:1* cls:1	**SNE**; **2** ovr:10* cls:10	BRH; 1 ovr:6 cls:6	BRH; 2 ovr:2 cls:2	DON; 1 ovr:6 cls:6	DON; 2 ovr:4 cls:4	OUL; 1 Ret	OUL; 2 ovr:5 cls:5												4th	138	
2006	Tech-Speed Motorsport	Vauxhall Astra Coupé		BRH; 1	BRH; 2	BRH; 3	MON; 1	MON; 2	MON; 3	OUL; 1	OUL; 2	OUL; 3	THR; 1	THR; 2	THR; 3	CRO; 1	CRO; 2	CRO; 3	DON; 1	DON; 2	DON; 3	SNE; 1	SNE; 2	SNE; 3	KNO; 1	KNO; 2	KNO; 3	BRH; 1; 10	BRH; 2; 11	BRH; 3; 11	SIL; 1; 14	SIL; 2; 8	SIL; 3; 9*		20th	7	
2007	Motorbase Performance	SEAT Toledo Cupra		BRH; 1	BRH; 2	BRH; 3	ROC; 1	ROC; 2	ROC; 3	THR; 1	THR; 2	THR; 3	CRO; 1	CRO; 2	CRO; 3	OUL; 1	OUL; 2	OUL; 3	DON; 1	DON; 2	DON; 3	SNE; 1	SNE; 2	SNE; 3	BRH; 1	BRH; 2	BRH; 3	KNO; 1	KNO; 2	KNO; 3	THR; 1; 13	THR; 2; 14	THR; 3; 16		NC	0	
2009	Sunshine.co.uk with Tech-Speed Motorsport	Honda Integra Type-R		BRH; 1	BRH; 2	BRH; 3	THR; 1; 5	THR; 2; 10	**THR**; **3** Ret	DON; 1 Ret	DON; 2; 11	DON; 3; 16	OUL; 1; 12	OUL; 2; 9	OUL; 3; 9	CRO; 1; 9	CRO; 2; 10	**CRO**; **3** Ret*	SNE; 1; 3	SNE; 2; 5	SNE; 3; 6	KNO; 1; 9	KNO; 2; 5	KNO; 3; 9	SIL; 1; 9	SIL; 2; 10	SIL; 3; 9	ROC; 1; 9	ROC; 2 Ret	ROC; 3 Ret	BRH; 1; 9	BRH; 2; 7	BRH; 3 Ret		12th	60	
2010	Sunshine.co.uk with Tech-Speed Motorsport	Honda Integra Type-R		THR; 1; 4	THR; 2; 3	THR; 3; 6	ROC; 1; 6	ROC; 2; 8	ROC; 3; 2	BRH; 1; 6	BRH; 2; 4	BRH; 3 Ret	OUL; 1 Ret	OUL; 2 Ret	OUL; 3; 9	CRO; 1; 5	CRO; 2; 4	CRO; 3; 5	SNE; 1; 11	SNE; 2 Ret	SNE; 3; 8	SIL; 1; 7	SIL; 2; 6	**SIL**; **3**; 2*	KNO; 1; 8	KNO; 2; 10	KNO; 3; 4	DON; 1 Ret	DON; 2; 12	DON; 3 Ret	BRH; 1; 6	BRH; 2; 4	BRH; 3; 5		9th	136	
2011	GoMobileUK.com with tech-speed	Chevrolet Cruze LT		BRH; 1; 7	BRH; 2; 5	BRH; 3; 3	DON; 1; 8	DON; 2 Ret	DON; 3; 8	THR; 1; 13	THR; 2; 11	THR; 3; 14	OUL; 1; 13	OUL; 2; 7	OUL; 3 Ret	CRO; 1; 9	CRO; 2 Ret	CRO; 3 Ret	SNE; 1; 7	SNE; 2; 5	SNE; 3; 2	KNO; 1; 13	KNO; 2; 14	KNO; 3 Ret	ROC; 1; 2	ROC; 2; 7	ROC; 3; 4	BRH; 1; 6	BRH; 2; 4	BRH; 3 Ret	SIL; 1 Ret	SIL; 2 Ret	SIL; 3; 12		10th	91	
2012	Speedworks Motorsport	Toyota Avensis		BRH; 1	BRH; 2	BRH; 3	DON; 1	DON; 2	DON; 3	THR; 1	THR; 2	THR; 3	OUL; 1	OUL; 2	OUL; 3	CRO; 1; 17	CRO; 2 Ret	CRO; 3; 13	SNE; 1	SNE; 2	SNE; 3	KNO; 1; 6	KNO; 2; 4	KNO; 3; 6	ROC; 1	ROC; 2	ROC; 3	SIL; 1	SIL; 2	SIL; 3	BRH; 1	BRH; 2	BRH; 3		22nd	36	
2013	RCIB Insurance Racing	Vauxhall Insignia		BRH; 1	BRH; 2	BRH; 3	DON; 1	DON; 2	DON; 3	THR; 1	THR; 2	THR; 3	OUL; 1	OUL; 2	OUL; 3	CRO; 1	CRO; 2	CRO; 3	SNE; 1	SNE; 2	SNE; 3	KNO; 1 Ret	KNO; 2 DNS	KNO; 3 Ret	ROC; 1	ROC; 2	ROC; 3	SIL; 1	SIL; 2	SIL; 3	BRH; 1	BRH; 2	BRH; 3		NC	0	

† Event with 2 races staged for the different classes.

=== Complete British GT Championship results ===
(key) (Races in italics indicate fastest lap in class)

Year	Team	Car	Class	1	2	3	4	5	6	7	8	9	10	11	12	13	14	Pos	Points	Ref
2007	Team RPM	Viper Competition Coupe	GT3	OUL; 1	OUL; 2	DON; 1	DON; 2	SNE; 1	BRH; 1	BRH; 2	SIL; 1	THR; 1	THR; 2	CRO; 1; 6	CRO; 2; 4	ROC; 1	ROC; 2	NC	0	
2008	Team RPM	Viper Competition Coupe	GT3	OUL; 1; 5	OUL; 2; 3	KNO; 1 Ret	KNO; 2 DSQ	ROC; 1 Ret	ROC; 2; 1	SNE; 1; 14	SNE; 2; 10	THR; 1	THR; 2	BRH; 1	BRH; 2	SIL; 1	DON; 1	16th	20	
2014	Track Group	Aston Martin V8 Vantage GT4	GT4	OUL; 1	OUL; 2	ROC; 1	SIL; 1; 26	SNE; 1	SNE; 2	SPA; 1	SPA; 2	BRH; 1	DON; 1					17th	1.5	
