= Mike Jordan (racing driver) =

British racing driver (born 1958)

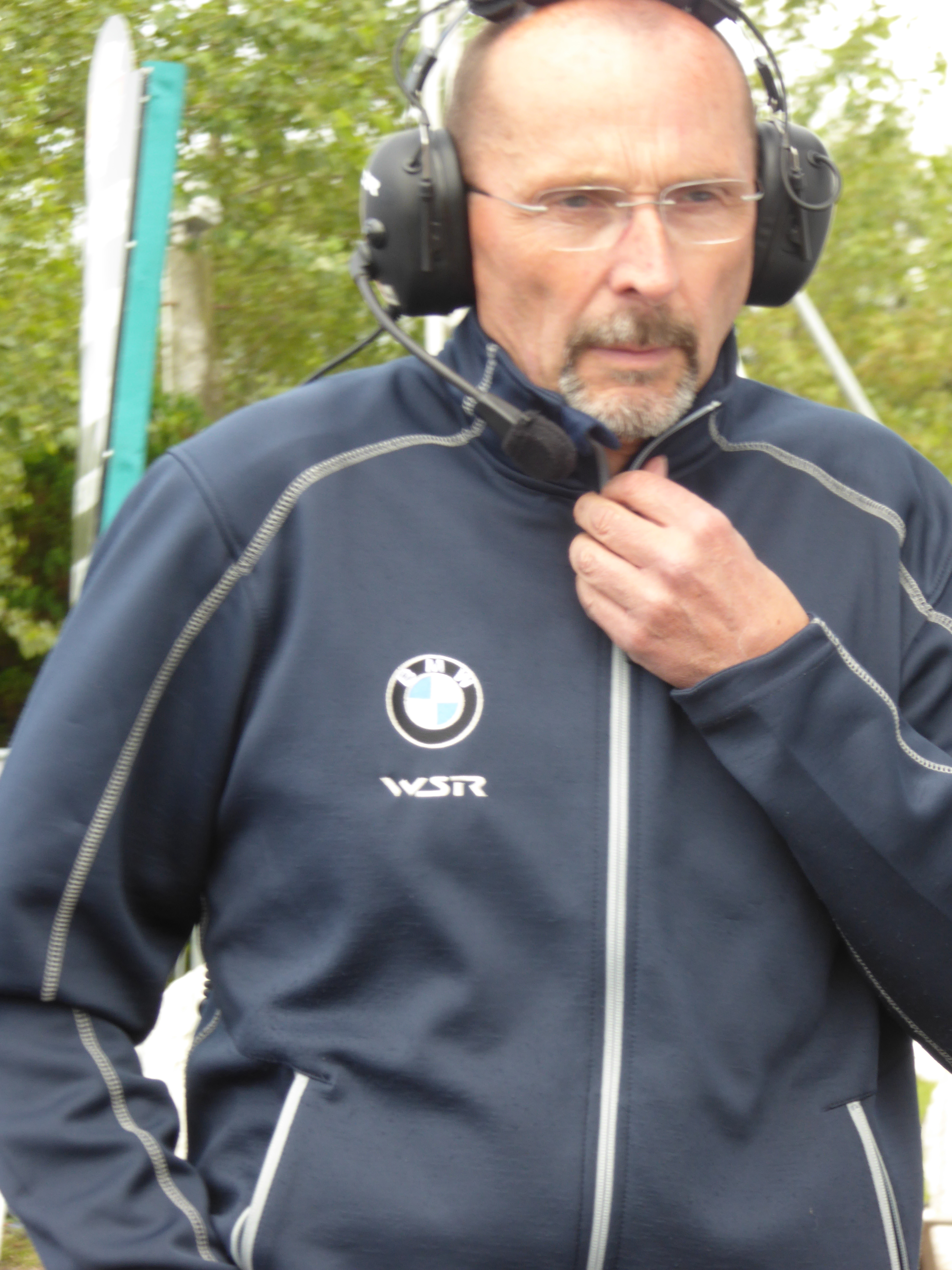
- Jordan in 2017
- Nationality: British
- Born: 17 February 1958 (age 68) Sutton Coldfield, England
- Relatives: Andrew Jordan (son)

British Touring Car Championship
- Years active: 1989, 2006–2008
- Teams: Eurotech Racing
- Starts: 91
- Wins: 1
- Poles: 0
- Fastest laps: 3
- Best finish: 8th in 2007

Previous series
- 2011–12 2009 2004 2004–05 2002 2001–05 2000–05 1999–2000 1998 1995–98 1992–93 1987–88, 1990–91: Blancpain Endurance Series; Britcar Production; Le Mans Endurance Series; British Historic Rallying; Rolex Sports Car Series; FIA GT Championship; British GT Championship; TVR Tuscan Challenge; Pickup Truck Racing; Eurocar V8 Championship; National Saloon Cars; Porsche Cup GB

Championship titles
- 2001 1996–97 1987, 1991 1979: British GT Championship; Eurocar V8 Championship; Porsche Cup GB; CSCC Pre-57 Championship

Awards
- 2001: Autosport British Club Driver of the Year

Michael Anthony Jordan (born 17 February 1958) is a British racing driver who competed in various classes of saloon and sportscar racing. He has won three British titles and spent three years competing in the BTCC against many drivers less than half his age, including his son and teammate Andrew. In 2006 he became the oldest driver ever to win a BTCC race. He lives in Lichfield with his wife Judith and their three children.

== Racing career ==
Born in Sutton Coldfield, Jordan started racing in the late 1970s with a Morris Minor in the Classic Saloon Car Club's Pre-57 road-going championship, which he won in 1979. He bought the car from a workmate with bank loans and drove it on the road. His first BTCC appearances were in 1989 in a Peugeot.

Jordan was Porsche Cup champion in 1987 and 1991. He then competed in saloon cars and won the Willhire 24 Hour race in 1992 and 1993, also finishing runner up in the 1992 ESSO Group N Saloon Car Championship.

In the V8 Eurocar racing saloons, Jordan was champion in 1996 and 1997 and then moved to the TVR Tuscan Challenge, twice finishing runner up in the championship.

=== GT Racing ===
In 2000, Jordan teamed up with Mark Sumpter to race a Porsche GT3R in the GTO division of the British GT Championship, supporting Sumpter to the title. Jordan then jumped into the top class of the British GT championship to race a thundering Lister Storm with David Warnock. Despite fierce opposition, they won the title in 2001 and finished second the following season. Jordan also made his FIA GT championship with Lister in 2001, winning outright at Nurburgring when partnering Jamie Campbell-Walter.

In 2002, Jordan also competed with Sumpter in the Daytona 24 Hours, finishing the race at their first attempt. For 2003, Jordan once again teamed up with Sumpter to compete in the FIA GT championship alongside teammates Godfrey and David Jones.

For 2004 and 2005, Jordan returned to the British GT Championship, winning races in 2004 with Sumpter and leading the chase of the Ferraris in 2005 when partnered by former TVR Tuscan rival Michael Caine.

=== BTCC ===
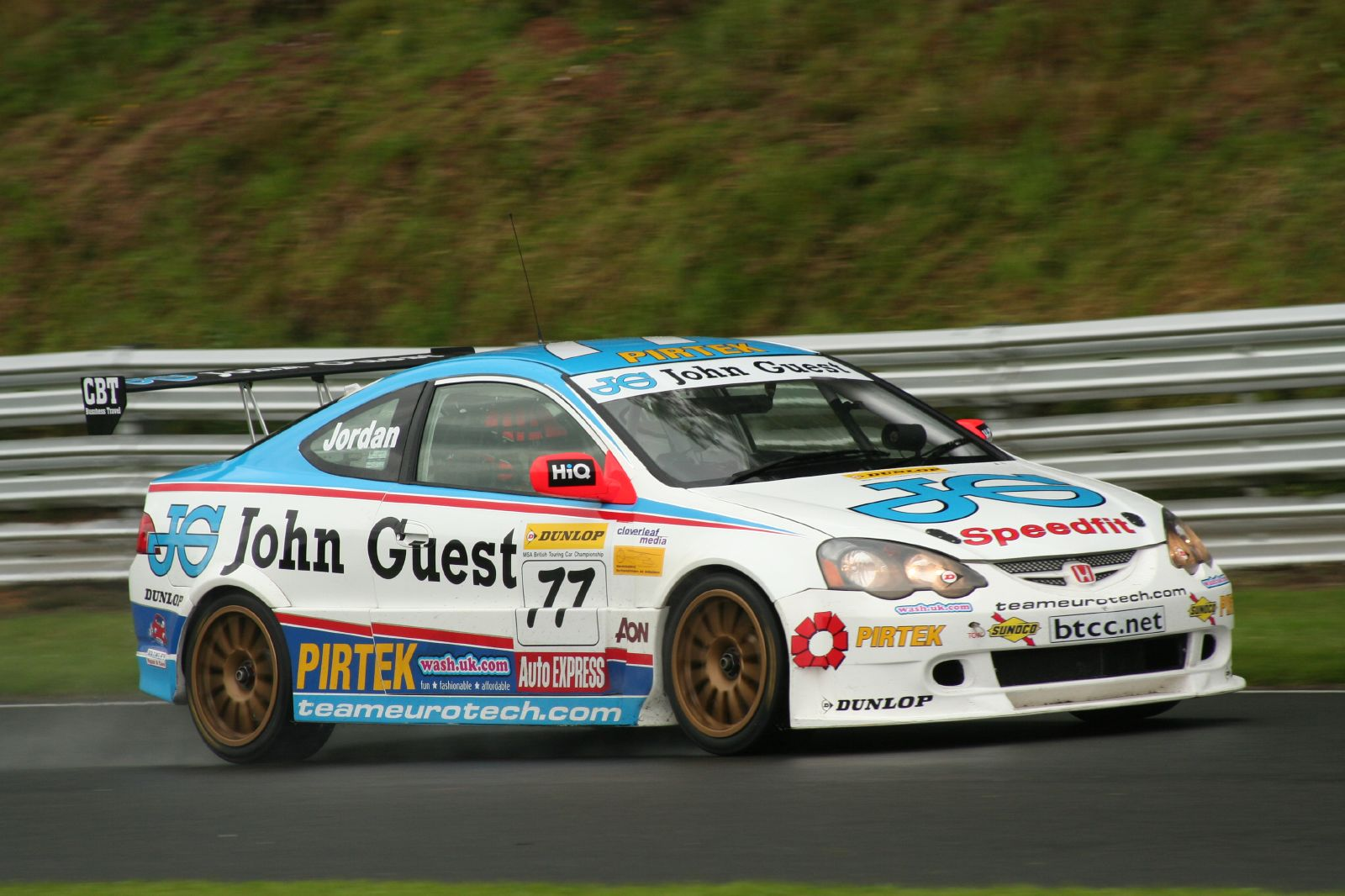
Jordan competing in the 2007 British Touring Car Championship.

In 2006, Jordan returned to the British Touring Car Championship in an ex-Team Dynamics Honda Integra ran by his Eurotech Racing team. Jordan broke a BTCC record at Mondello Park by taking his first and only BTCC race win. By taking the win, he became the championship's oldest ever race winner at the age of 48. His season finished badly after contact with James Thompson caused him to crash heavily, causing him to spend a few days in hospital.

== Racing record ==
=== Complete British GT Championship results ===
(key) (Races in bold indicate pole position) (Races in italics indicate fastest lap)

Year	Team	Car	Class	1	2	3	4	5	6	7	8	9	10	11	12	13	Pos	Points
2000	Team Eurotech	Porsche 996 GT3-R	GTO	**THR**; **1**; 4	CRO; 1; 4	OUL; 1	**DON**; **1**; 12	SIL; 1; 5	**BRH**; **1**; 9	DON; 1; 6	CRO; 1; 5	SIL; 1; 10	SNE; 1; 5	SPA; 1; 4	SIL; 1; 19		2nd	137
2001	Lister Storm Racing	Lister Storm	GT	SIL; 1; 1	SNE; 1; 2	DON; 1; 1	OUL; 1; 2	CRO; 1; 1	ROC; 1; 3	CAS; 1; 1	**BRH**; **1** Ret	**DON**; **1**; 1	**KNO**; **1**; **3**	**THR**; **1**; 1	BRH; 1; 2	SIL; 1; 1	1st	163
2002	Lister Storm Racing	Lister Storm	GT	BRH; 1 Ret	DON; 1; 1	SIL; 1; 3	KNO; 1; 4	CRO; 1; 2	**SIL**; **1**; 2	**CAS**; **1**; 1	ROC; 1 Ret	**OUL**; **1**; 13	**SNE**; **1**; 4	**THR**; **1**; 3	DON; 1; 1		?	209

=== Complete British Touring Car Championship results ===
(key) Races in bold indicate pole position (1 point awarded – 2006–2008 just in first race, 1989 in class) Races in italics indicate fastest lap (1 point awarded – 1989, 2006–2008 all races, 1989 in class) * signifies that driver lead race for at least one lap (1 point awarded all races 2006 onwards)

Year	Team	Car	Class	1	2	3	4	5	6	7	8	9	10	11	12	13	14	15	16	17	18	19	20	21	22	23	24	25	26	27	28	29	30	Overall Pos	Pts	Class Pos
1989	Team Eurotech	Peugeot 309 GTi	C	OUL ovr:16 cls:2	SIL ovr:23 cls:4	THR ovr:21 cls:4	DON ovr:14 cls:3	THR	SIL	SIL; Ret	BRH	SNE	BRH	BIR; DNS	DON	SIL																		22nd	15	6th
2006	Team Eurotech with John Guest	Honda Integra Type-R		BRH; 1; 5	BRH; 2 Ret	BRH; 3 Ret	MON; 1; 9	MON; 2; 7	MON; 3; 1*	OUL; 1; 2	OUL; 2; 12	OUL; 3; 7	THR; 1 Ret	THR; 2 Ret	THR; 3 Ret	CRO; 1; 11	CRO; 2; 10	CRO; 3; 7	DON; 1; 8	DON; 2; 3	DON; 3 Ret	SNE; 1; 5	SNE; 2; 4	SNE; 3; 12	KNO; 1; 5	KNO; 2 Ret	KNO; 3 DNS	BRH; 1; 8	BRH; 2 Ret	BRH; 3; 7	SIL; 1; 9	SIL; 2 Ret	SIL; 3 DNS	10th	91	
2007	Team Eurotech with John Guest	Honda Integra Type-R		BRH; 1; 4	BRH; 2 Ret	BRH; 3; 8	ROC; 1; 6	ROC; 2 Ret	ROC; 3; 8	THR; 1; 10	THR; 2; 4	THR; 3; 3	CRO; 1; 5	CRO; 2; 3	CRO; 3; 10	OUL; 1; 8	OUL; 2; 3	OUL; 3; 9	DON; 1; 4	DON; 2; 7	DON; 3; 3*	SNE; 1; 7	SNE; 2 Ret	SNE; 3 DNS	BRH; 1; 13	BRH; 2; 5	BRH; 3; 8*	KNO; 1; 5	KNO; 2; 8	**KNO**; **3**; 4*	THR; 1 Ret	THR; 2; 8	THR; 3 Ret	8th	131	
2008	John Guest Racing	Honda Integra Type-R		BRH; 1; 13	BRH; 2; 9	**BRH**; **3**; 4	ROC; 1 Ret	ROC; 2 Ret	ROC; 3; 9	DON; 1; 10	DON; 2 Ret	DON; 3; 9	THR; 1; 9	THR; 2; 15	THR; 3; 8	CRO; 1; 6	CRO; 2; 7	**CRO**; **3** Ret	SNE; 1; 11	SNE; 2; 9	SNE; 3 Ret	OUL; 1 Ret	OUL; 2 DNS	OUL; 3 DNS	KNO; 1; 11	KNO; 2; 13	KNO; 3; 11	SIL; 1 Ret	SIL; 2; 10	**SIL**; **3** Ret	BRH; 1; 12	BRH; 2; 10	BRH; 3; 10	14th	34	

Awards
Preceded by Michael Caine	Autosport; British Club Driver of the Year; 2001	Succeeded by Danny Watts
