= BTC-T Honda Integra Type R =

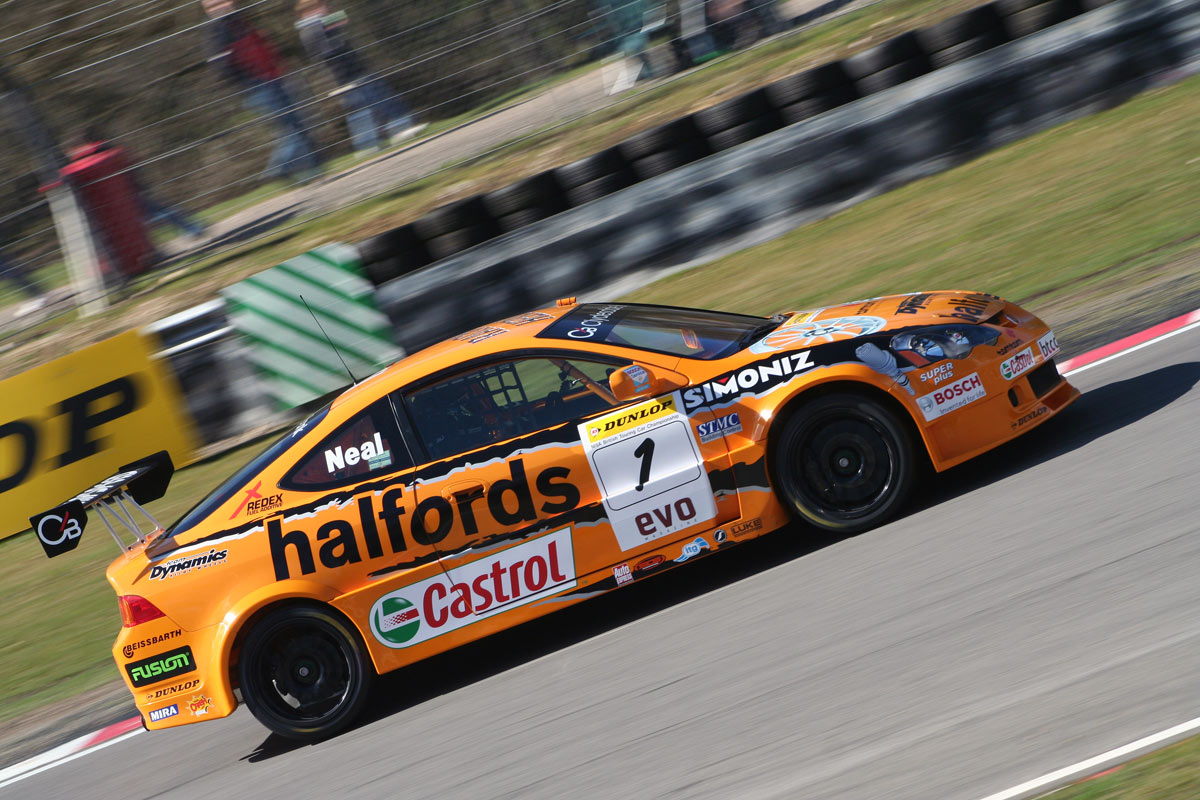
- Category: BTCC
- Constructor: Team Dynamics

Technical specifications
- Chassis: Honda Integra (fourth generation)
- Engine: 2,000 cc (122.0 cu in) In-line 4 NA front-mounted, FWD
- Transmission: 6 Sequential

Competition history
- Notable entrants: Team Halfords; Motorbase Performance; Eurotech Racing; Robertshaw Racing; TH Motorsport; Sibsport; John Guest Racing; Tech-Speed Motorsport; Central Group Racing; WRC Developments with Barwell; Team Wood Racing
- Debut: 2005 BTCC at Donington Park
Races	Wins	Poles	F/Laps
180 (2005-2010)	27	7	27
- Teams' Championships: 2 (2005, 2006)
- Constructors' Championships: 0
- Drivers' Championships: 2 (2005, 2006)

In 2005, Team Dynamics took advantage of a loophole in the British Touring Car Championship regulations that allowed cars to enter, whether they were on sale in the United Kingdom or not. They converted a pair of Honda Integra Japanese imports into BTC Touring spec racing cars, using the internals from the moderately successful Honda Civic Type R that had been competing in the BTCC since 2002. The car was an instant hit, winning its debut race at Donington Park despite only having a limited amount of testing. Matt Neal scored points in every single race to take his first BTCC title - the first for a privateer driver in the modern era. He repeated the feat in 2006 and by that point, five cars had been built, all of them race winners in the hands of the Dynamics drivers, before being passed into the hands of various independent teams. The cars remained in the championship until 2011, in the hands of Lea Wood, even finishing 7th at Oulton Park in that final season - an impressive result for a car that had been built 6 years previously. Indeed, it was the last of the BTC-Touring spec cars to be used in the BTCC; and was only finally retired as cars built to these regulations could no longer compete in 2012.

== Chassis History ==
Car 1

- 2005 - Matt Neal
- 2006 - Mike Jordan
- 2007 - Mike Jordan
- 2008 - Andrew Jordan
- 2009 - Martyn Bell
- 2010 - John George

Car 2

- 2005 - Dan Eaves
- 2006 - David Pinkney
- 2007 - Unused
- 2008 - Unused
- 2009 - John George
- 2010 - James Kaye
- 2011 - Dubai 24h - WRC Developments with Barwell

Car 3

- 2005 - Gareth Howell (Rounds 22-30)
- 2006 - Gareth Howell (Rounds 19-30)
- 2007 - Simon Blanckley (Rounds 1-21)/Alan Taylor (Rounds 25-30)
- 2008 - Alan Taylor
- 2009 - Unused
- 2010 - Lea Wood
- 2011 - Lea Wood

Car 4

- 2006 - Matt Neal
- 2007 - John George
- 2008 - John George - Written off in an accident at Brands Hatch in the final round of the season.

Car 5

- 2006 - Gordon Shedden
- 2007 - Unused
- 2008 - Mike Jordan
- 2009 - Paul O'Neill
- 2010 - Paul O'Neill
