= Martyn Bell =

British racing driver (born 1964)

- Nationality: (United Kingdom) British
- Born: July 17, 1964 (age 62) England

Previous series
- 2006–09 2002–05: BTCC; Kumho BMW Championship

Championship titles
- 2004: Kumho BMW Championship

Martyn Nicholas Bell (born 17 July 1964) is a former auto racing driver. He raced BMWs in various championships including for four year the British Touring Car Championship. He won one overall title and three class titles in his nine years of driving BMWs for Geoff Steel (himself a former BTCC racer) and was the first person to campaign a BMW E46 in the UK.

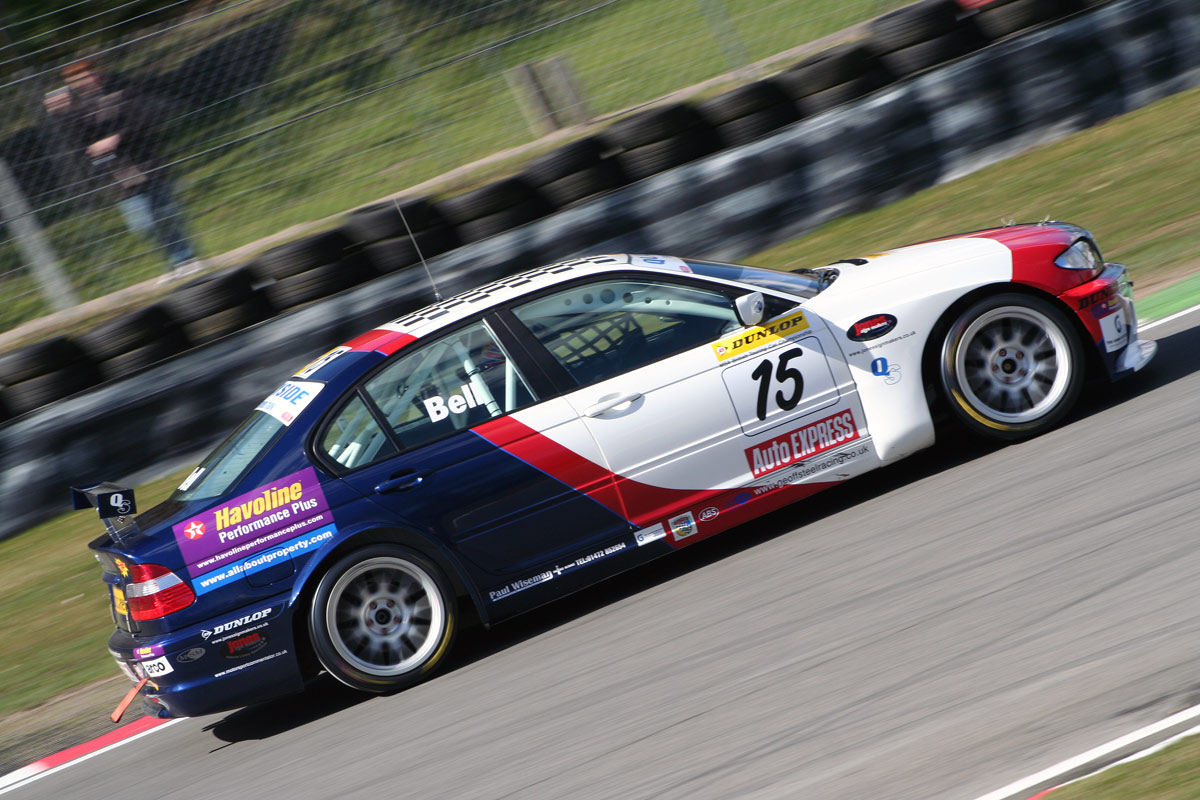
Bell driving the Geoff Steel Racing-run BMW at the Brands Hatch round of the 2006 British Touring Car Championship.

In 2006, Bell and Steel moved into the BTCC in a 320i. He returned for the 2007 BTCC season with the same car under the team allaboutproperty.com Team banner. In 2008, he teamed up with fellow BTCC racer Erkut Kızılırmak with two former works Vauxhall Astra Sports Hatch for Team Arkas Racing with Tech-Speed Motorsport. He competed in the 2009 championship in a two-car Tech-Speed Motorsport outfit, alongside Paul O'Neill.

Bell took a sabbatical from motorsport for 2010 due to a hip injury he sustained during the previous year.

== Personal ==
Bell is primarily a family man, married with two children and the Proprietor of Martyn Bell Motor Engineers Limited in Barrow upon Humber, some 15 miles (24 km) from Grimsby in North East Lincolnshire. He currently lives in South Ferriby, a hamlet three miles outside Barrow upon Humber.

== Racing record ==
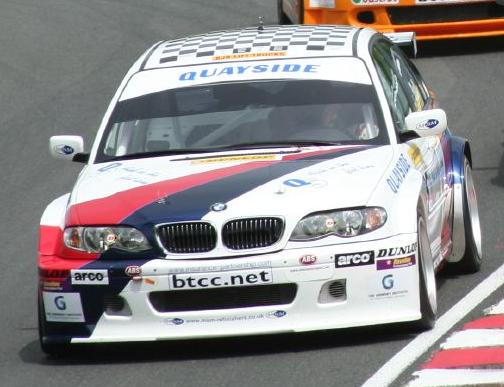
Bell driving at the Oulton Park round of the 2006 British Touring Car Championship.

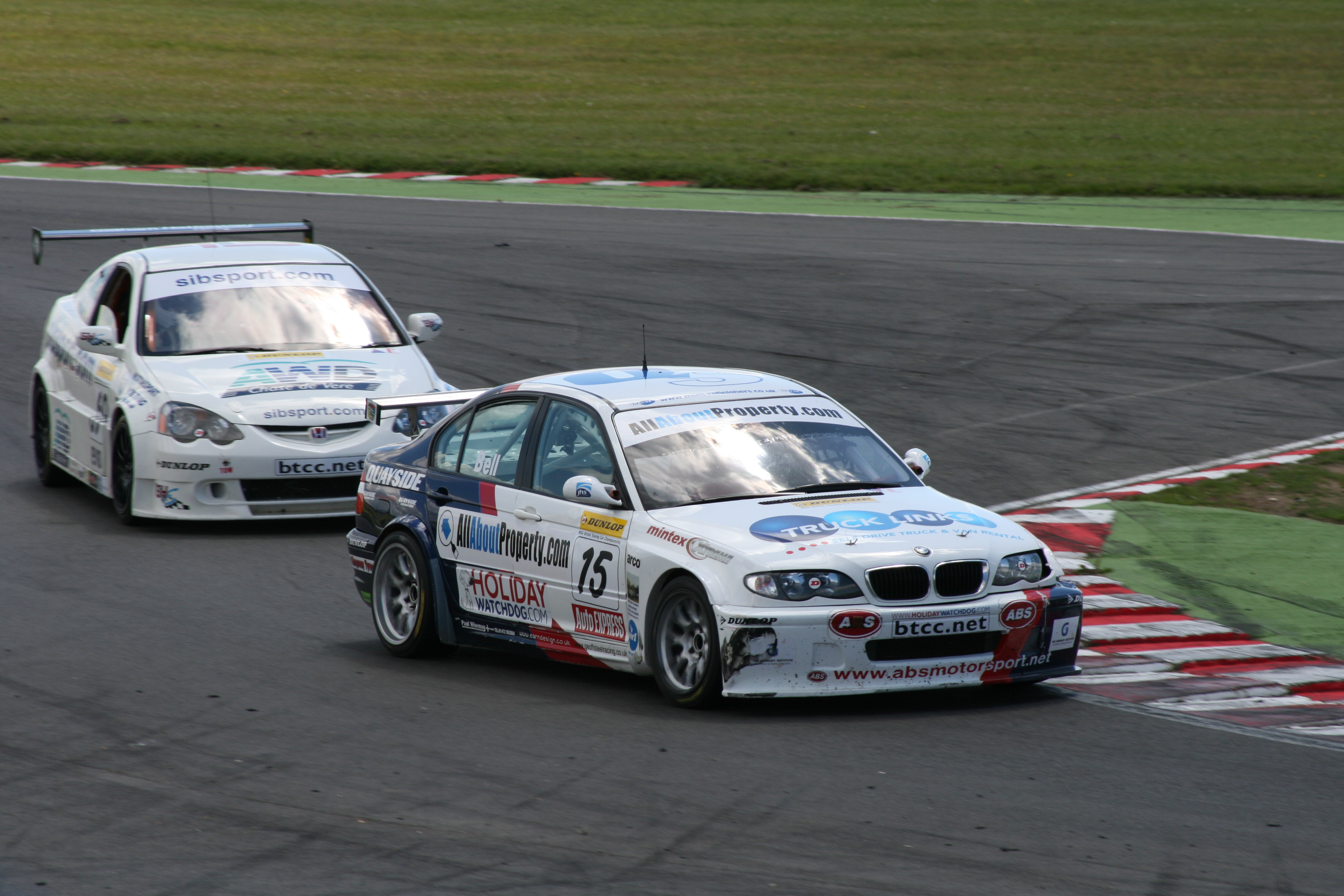
Bell is pursued by Simon Blanckley at the Snetterton round of the 2007 British Touring Car Championship season.

=== Career summary ===
Season	Series	Team/Car	Races	Wins	Poles	F/Laps	Podiums	Points	Position
Pre; 1996	Motocross	?	?					?	?
1997	BMW Championship	(BMW 325i Sport E30)	?	?				?	4th in class
1998	BMW Championship	(BMW 325i Sport E30)	?	?				?	?
1999	BMW Championship	(BMW 325i Sport E30/BMW M3 E36)	?	?				?	1st in class
2000	BMW Championship	(BMW 325i Sport E30/BMW M3 E36)	?	?				?	1st in class
2001	BMW Championship	(BMW 325i Sport E30/BMW M3 E36)	?	?				?	1st in class
2002	BMW Championship	(BMW M3 E36)	?	?				?	2nd
2003	Kumho BMW Championship	(BMW M3 E46)	?	?				?	3rd in class (7th Overall)
2004	Kumho BMW Championship	(BMW M3 E46)	?	?				?	1st
2005	Kumho BMW Championship	(BMW M3 E46)	?	?				?	2nd in class (4th overall)
2006	British Touring Car Championship	Geoff Steel Racing (BMW 320i E46)	30	0	0	0	0	8	18th
2007	British Touring Car Championship	Team Allaboutproperty.com (BMW 320i E46)	30	0	0	0	0	3	21st
2008	British Touring Car Championship	Arkas Racing with Sunshine.co.uk (Vauxhall Astra Sport Hatch)	30	0	0	0	0	0	23rd
2009	British Touring Car Championship	Sunshine.co.uk with Tech-Speed Motorsport (Honda Integra Type R)	21	0	0	0	0	2	23rd

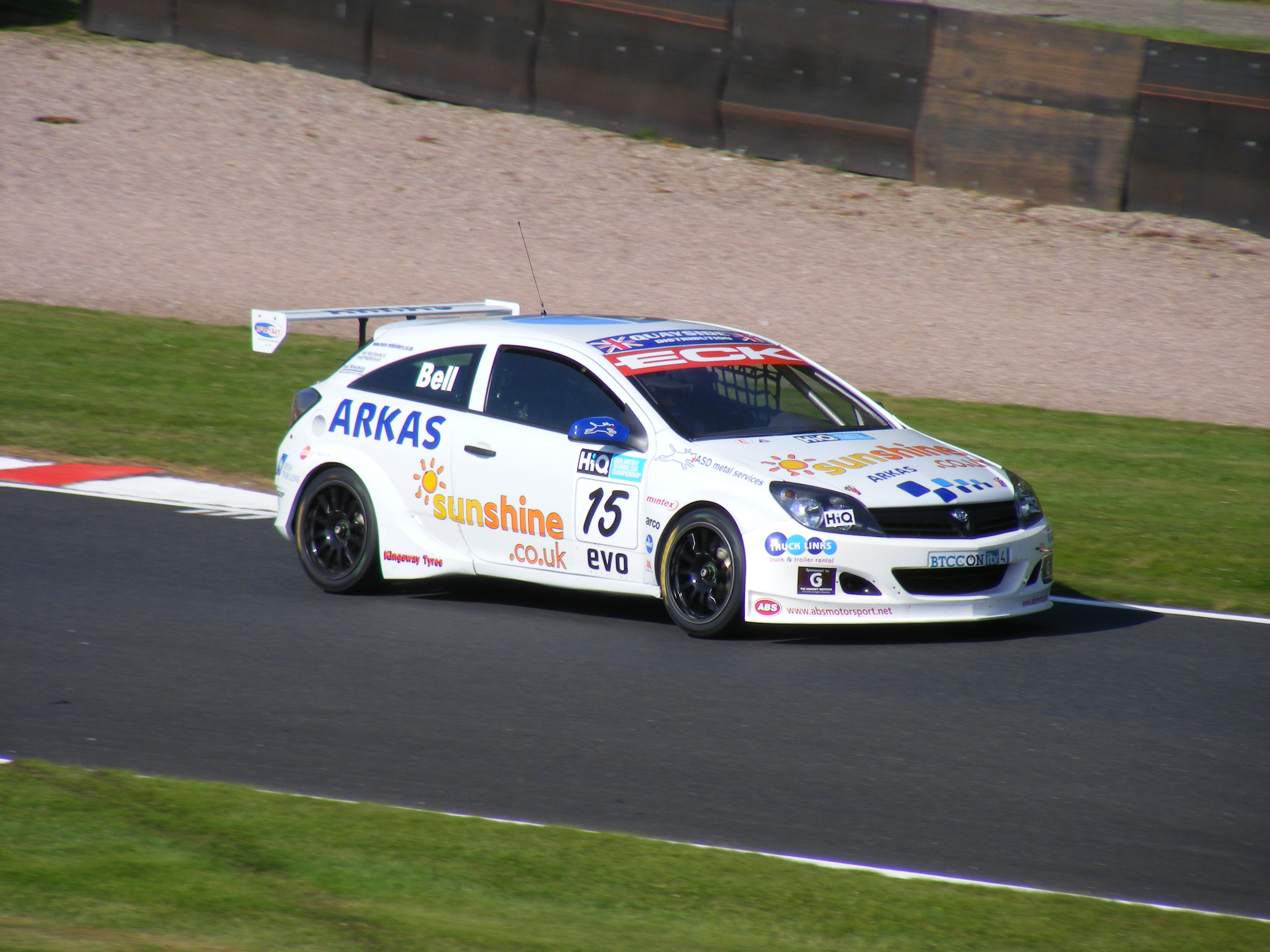
Bell driving the Arkas Racing Vauxhall Astra during the 2008 British Touring Car Championship.

=== Complete British Touring Car Championship results ===
(key) (Races in bold indicate pole position - 1 point awarded in first race) (Races in italics indicate fastest lap - 1 point awarded all races) (* signifies that driver lead race for at least one lap - 1 point awarded all races)

Year	Team	Car	1	2	3	4	5	6	7	8	9	10	11	12	13	14	15	16	17	18	19	20	21	22	23	24	25	26	27	28	29	30	Pos	Pts
2006	Geoff Steel Racing	BMW 320i	BRH; 1; 10	BRH; 2 Ret	BRH; 3 Ret	MON; 1; 15	MON; 2; 9	MON; 3; 11	OUL; 1 Ret	OUL; 2; 13	OUL; 3; 14	THR; 1; 12	THR; 2 Ret	THR; 3 DNS	CRO; 1; 16	CRO; 2; 15	CRO; 3; 16	DON; 1; 14	DON; 2; 12	DON; 3; 10	SNE; 1; 14	SNE; 2 Ret	SNE; 3; 13	KNO; 1 Ret	KNO; 2; 8	KNO; 3; 10	BRH; 1; 14	BRH; 2 Ret	BRH; 3; 13	SIL; 1; 16	SIL; 2 Ret	SIL; 3; 15	**18th**	**8**
2007	Team allaboutproperty.com	BMW 320i	BRH; 1; 13	BRH; 2; 13	BRH; 3; 11	ROC; 1; 15	ROC; 2; 12	ROC; 3 DNS	THR; 1; 13	THR; 2 Ret	THR; 3; 15	CRO; 1; 14	CRO; 2; 12	CRO; 3 Ret	OUL; 1; 13	OUL; 2; 14	OUL; 3; 10	DON; 1 Ret	DON; 2; 20	DON; 3; 20	SNE; 1; 15	SNE; 2; 12	SNE; 3; 16	BRH; 1 Ret	BRH; 2 Ret	BRH; 3; 14	KNO; 1; 9	KNO; 2; 17	KNO; 3; 13	THR; 1 Ret	THR; 2; 16	THR; 3 Ret	**21st**	**3**
2008	Arkas Racing with sunshine.co.uk	Vauxhall Astra Sport Hatch	BRH; 1 Ret	BRH; 2; 17	BRH; 3; 16	ROC; 1; 18	ROC; 2; 17	ROC; 3; 12	DON; 1; 14	DON; 2 Ret	DON; 3 Ret	THR; 1; 17	THR; 2 Ret	THR; 3; 15	CRO; 1; 20	CRO; 2; 16	CRO; 3 Ret	SNE; 1 Ret	SNE; 2; 18	SNE; 3; 14	OUL; 1; 18	OUL; 2; 13	OUL; 3; 14	KNO; 1 Ret	KNO; 2; 18	KNO; 3; 18	SIL; 1; 17	SIL; 2; 14	SIL; 3; 18	BRH; 1; 17	BRH; 2; 16	BRH; 3 Ret	**23rd**	**0**
2009	Sunshine.co.uk with Tech-Speed Motorsport	Honda Integra Type-R	BRH; 1; 10	BRH; 2; 12	BRH; 3; 10	THR; 1; 13	THR; 2; 14	THR; 3; 13	DON; 1; 15	DON; 2; 15	DON; 3; 19	OUL; 1; 17	OUL; 2; 17	OUL; 3; 15	CRO; 1; 15	CRO; 2; 13	CRO; 3; 11	SNE; 1	SNE; 2	SNE; 3	KNO; 1	KNO; 2	KNO; 3	SIL; 1; 15	SIL; 2; 15	SIL; 3; 18	ROC; 1	ROC; 2	ROC; 3	BRH; 1; 17	BRH; 2 Ret	BRH; 3 Ret	**23rd**	**2**
