= John George (racing driver) =

British former racing driver and entrepreneur (born 1961)

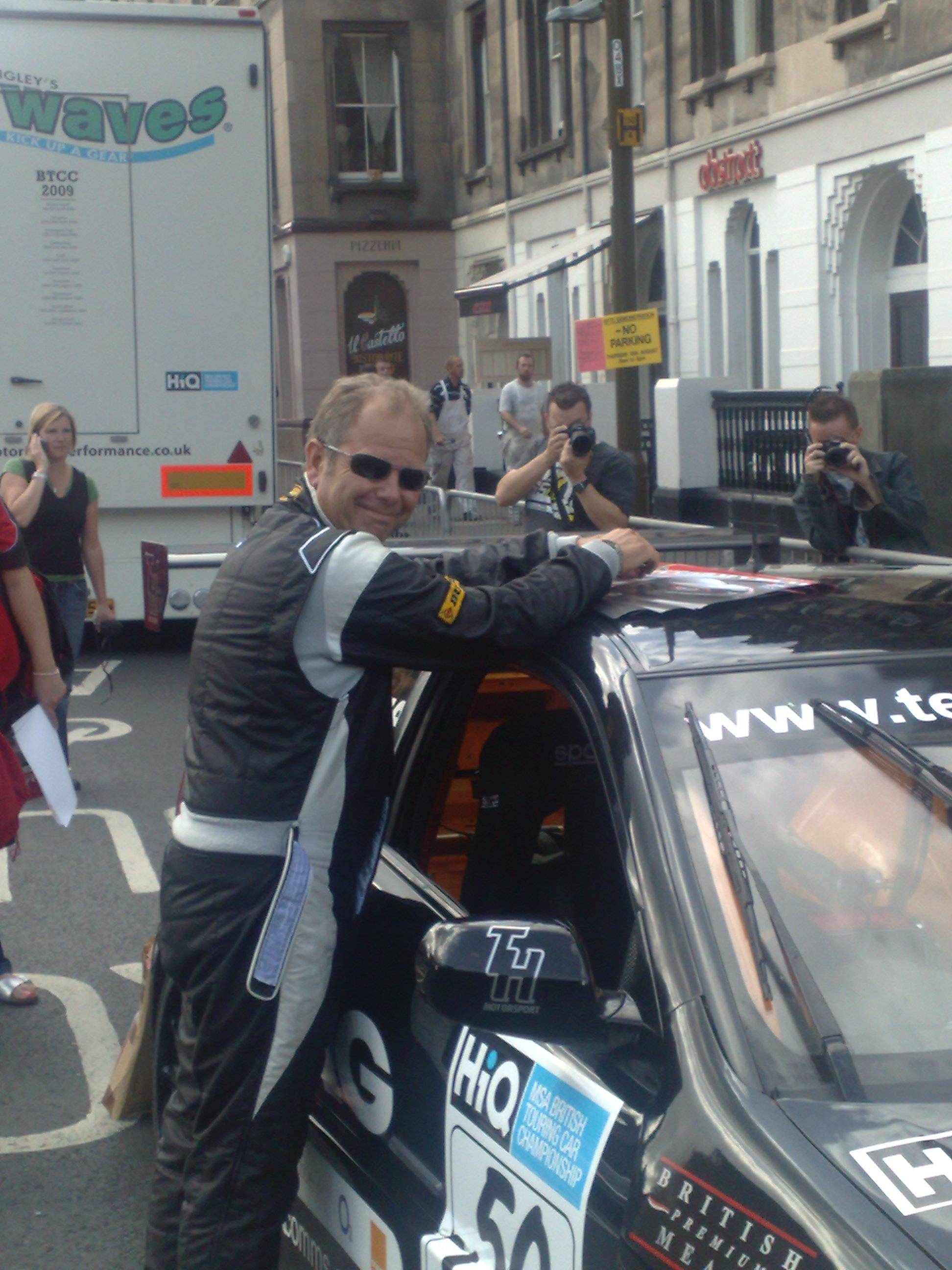
- George at the 2009 BTCC Festival in Edinburgh.
- Nationality: (United Kingdom) British
- Born: 22 March 1961 (age 65) Cornwall, England

British Touring Car Championship career
- Debut season: 2004
- Former teams: GoMobileUK.com with tech-speed TH Motorsport Racing with JAG; Mardi Gras Motorsport
- Starts: 166 (176 entries)
- Wins: 0
- Poles: 0
- Fastest laps: 0
- Best finish: 19th in 2007

Previous series
- 2003, 2005–2006 2001–2003 2000: Britcar; Renault Clio Cup; BRDC Formula Ford 1600

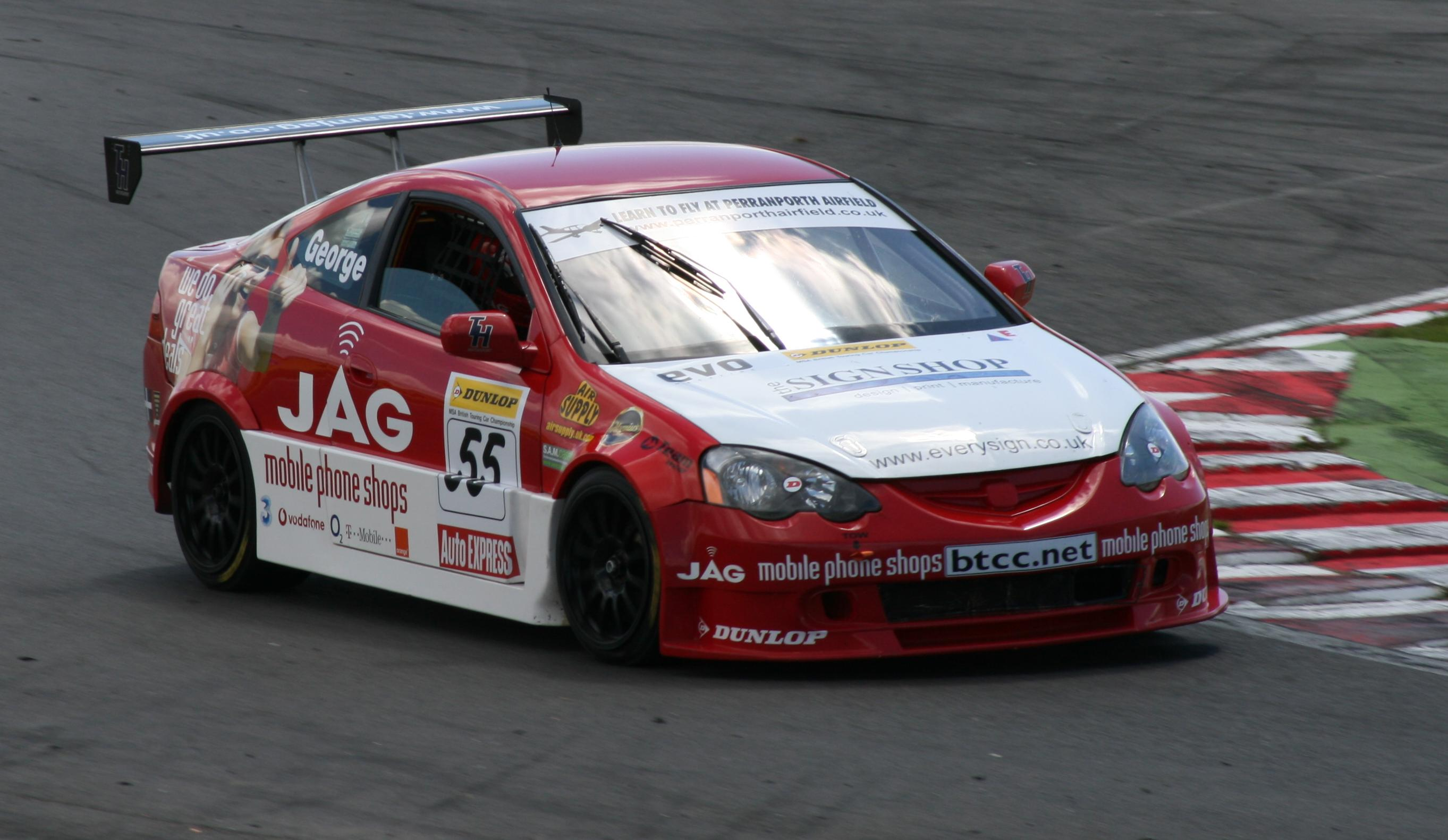
George driving the TH Motorsport Honda Integra at Snetterton during the 2008 British Touring Car Championship season.

John Alfred George (born 22 March 1961) is a British mobile phone entrepreneur and race car driver, best known for driving in the British Touring Car Championship between 2004 and 2011.

== Racing career ==
=== Early years ===
George raced in the Elf Clio Renaultsport UK Cup for Mardi Gras in 2002 and 2003, without much success. He also did some EERC Endurance races for them in 2003/2004 winning the saloon car class. He also did Britcar in 2005 winning his class in the Britcar/Silverstone 24hr and coming second in 2006.

=== British Touring Car Championship ===
==== Mardi Gras Motorsport (2004) ====
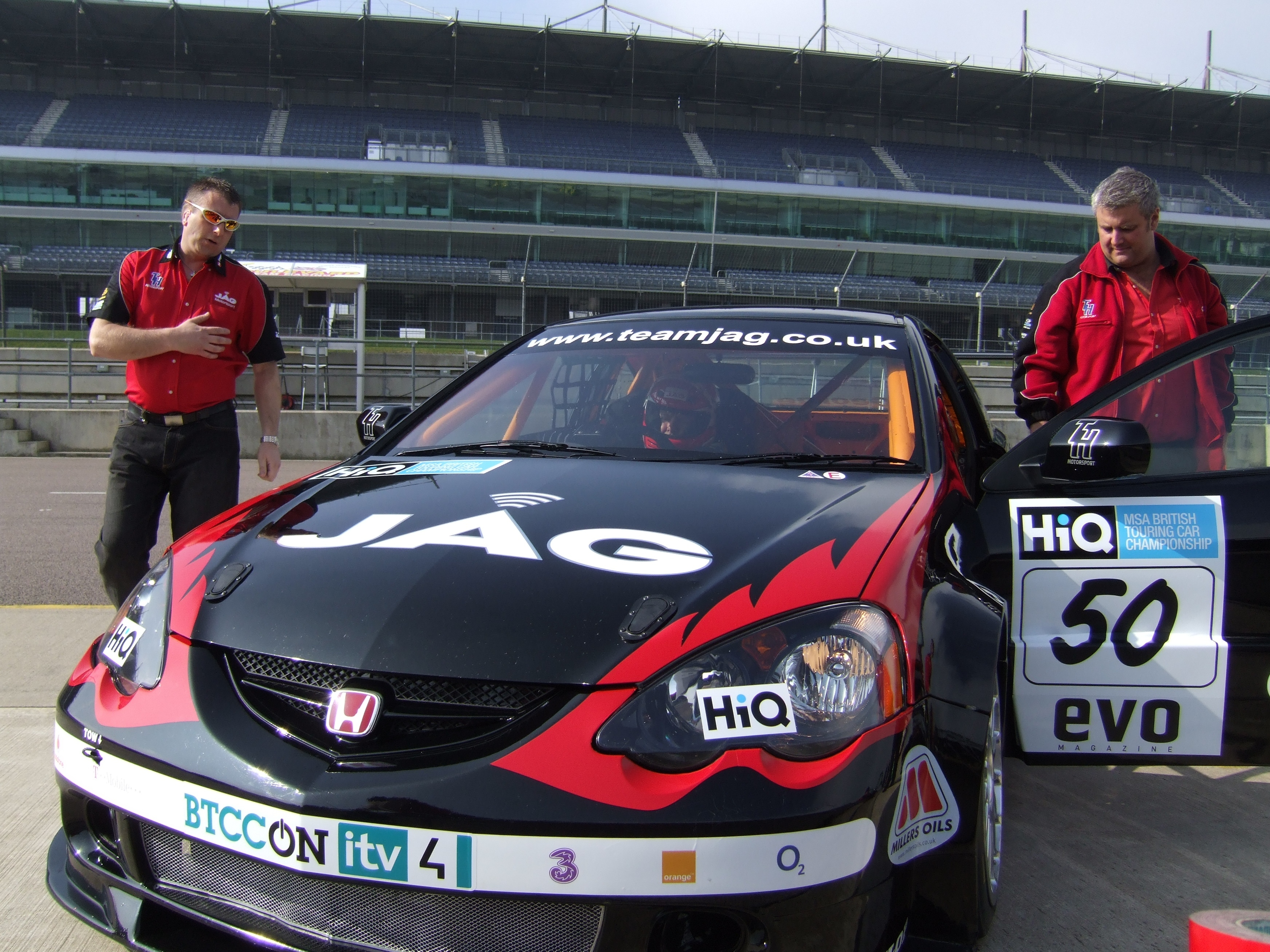
George at the 2009 BTCC Media Day at Rockingham.

George made his British Touring Car Championship debut in 2004, his entry for Mardi Gras was notable as the first car to use Liquefied petroleum gas (LPG) fuel. He drove both a Honda Civic Type-R and a Peugeot 406 during the season. A 2005 ride for Vic Lee Racing fell through when Lee was jailed for drug-dealing.

==== TH Motorsport (2007–2009) ====
In 2007, George returned to the BTCC claiming the TH Motorsport team's first ever BTCC points, with a top finish of eighth, and two pole starts in the reverse grid format, driving an ex-Matt Neal Honda Integra for the TH Motorsport team.

The Integra was becoming outdated by 2008, and with only one point, George finished 21st in the championship. His season ended with a spectacular crash during the final round at Brands Hatch. George was battling with Darren Turner as they approached Surtees for the first time. Turner made contact with the rear of George's Integra and it cannoned off into the barriers which launched the car into a series of rolls, before landing on its side. He suffered bruising but no broken bones, but spent two nights in hospital as a precaution.

George struggled in the 2009 season, finishing 25th in the championship for TH Motorsport.

==== Tech-Speed Motorsport (2010–2011) ====
George has moved to the Tech-Speed Motorsport team for 2010 and finished 13th in the Independent championship in what he has described as his most competitive season alongside team-mate Paul O'Neill. His best result was a ninth place at the opening race at Thruxton, however the team and George both expressed hopes that they would be back out for 2011 and realise a potential for more points-scoring finishes.

George stayed alongside O'Neill in 2011, driving an ex–Silverline Chevrolet Super 2000 Chevrolet Cruze. He collided with one of the barriers at Croft and tore the tendons in his right hand. He was able to participate in the following round at Snetterton while on painkillers and was fully healed by the time of the Knockhill round. Despite not scoring points in the main drivers' championship, he scored five points in the independents' trophy to finish the season 22nd in class.

George is coached by John Pratt, who has previously worked with Andy Priaulx.

== Personal life ==
George was head of JAG Communications, an independent mobile phone retailer. He has been active in the UK mobile phone industry since its early days. He also competed successfully in pistol shooting before it was banned in the UK. He is married to Sue, and has a daughter Kailey and son Kevin, plus grand daughters Katelyn, Holly and grandson Leam. He is teetotal and lives in Guernsey.

George is also a keen aviator and currently owns Perranporth airfield in Cornwall as well as flying most days in his Cessna Citation Mustang light jet based in Guernsey and also holding an American ATP jet rating. In February 2013, George put Perranporth airfield on the market for an asking price of £1.5million. In September 2019 ,George legally changed.

== Racing record ==
=== Complete British Touring Car Championship results ===
(key) (Races in bold indicate pole position – 1 point awarded in first race) (Races in italics indicate fastest lap – 1 point awarded all races) (* signifies that driver lead race for at least one lap – 1 point awarded all races)

Year	Team	Car	1	2	3	4	5	6	7	8	9	10	11	12	13	14	15	16	17	18	19	20	21	22	23	24	25	26	27	28	29	30	DC	Pts
2004	Mardi Gras Motorsport	Honda Civic Type-R	THR; 1; 15	THR; 2; 13	THR; 3 Ret	BRH; 1 Ret	BRH; 2 DNS	BRH; 3 DNS	SIL; 1; 17	SIL; 2; 20	SIL; 3 Ret	OUL; 1	OUL; 2	OUL; 3	MON; 1	MON; 2	MON; 3																24th	0
2004	Mardi Gras Motorsport	Peugeot 406 Coupé																CRO; 1; 17	CRO; 2 Ret	CRO; 3; 15	KNO; 1; 12	KNO; 2; 13	KNO; 3; 13	BRH; 1 Ret	BRH; 2 Ret	BRH; 3 Ret	SNE; 1; 15	SNE; 2; 16	SNE; 3; 17	DON; 1 Ret	DON; 2 DNS	DON; 3 DNS	24th	0
2007	TH Motorsport with JAG Racing	Honda Integra Type-R	BRH; 1; 19	BRH; 2; 16	BRH; 3; 19	ROC; 1; 14	ROC; 2; 10	**ROC**; **3** Ret	THR; 1 Ret	THR; 2 DNS	THR; 3; 12	CRO; 1; 17	CRO; 2; 9	**CRO**; **3** Ret	OUL; 1; 15	OUL; 2; 11	OUL; 3 Ret	DON; 1 Ret	DON; 2 Ret	DON; 3; 19	SNE; 1; 13	SNE; 2; 13	SNE; 3; 17	BRH; 1 Ret	BRH; 2 NC	BRH; 3; 10	KNO; 1; 8	KNO; 2; 12	KNO; 3 Ret	THR; 1; 16	THR; 2; 13	THR; 3; 13	19th	7
2008	TH Motorsport with JAG Racing	Honda Integra Type-R	BRH; 1; 17	BRH; 2; 19	BRH; 3; 12	ROC; 1; 15	ROC; 2; 16	ROC; 3 Ret	DON; 1 Ret	DON; 2 DNS	DON; 3 DNS	THR; 1; 20	THR; 2 NC	THR; 3; 12	CRO; 1; 17	CRO; 2; 17	CRO; 3 Ret	SNE; 1; 17	SNE; 2; 16	SNE; 3; 10	OUL; 1; 17	OUL; 2 Ret	OUL; 3 Ret	KNO; 1; 14	KNO; 2; 20	KNO; 3; 19	SIL; 1; 19	SIL; 2; 15	SIL; 3; 14	BRH; 1 Ret	BRH; 2; 15	BRH; 3 Ret	21st	1
2009	TH Motorsport Racing with JAG	Honda Integra Type-R	BRH; 1 Ret	BRH; 2 Ret	BRH; 3; 14	THR; 1; 18	THR; 2; 15	THR; 3 Ret	DON; 1; 17	DON; 2; 14	DON; 3; 17	OUL; 1 Ret	OUL; 2 DNS	OUL; 3; 16	CRO; 1; 14	CRO; 2; 14	CRO; 3; 12	SNE; 1; 13	SNE; 2; 16	SNE; 3; 11	KNO; 1; 13	KNO; 2; 14	KNO; 3; 14	SIL; 1; 16	SIL; 2; 17	SIL; 3; 17	ROC; 1; 17	ROC; 2 Ret	ROC; 3; 13	BRH; 1; 16	BRH; 2; 15	BRH; 3 Ret	25th	0
2010	sunshine.co.uk with tech-speed	Honda Integra Type-R	THR; 1; 9	THR; 2; 17	THR; 3 Ret	ROC; 1; 16	ROC; 2 Ret	ROC; 3; 15	BRH; 1 Ret	BRH; 2 DNS	BRH; 3 Ret	OUL; 1; 12	OUL; 2 Ret	OUL; 3 DNS	CRO; 1; 15	CRO; 2 Ret	CRO; 3; 12	SNE; 1; 12	SNE; 2 Ret	SNE; 3; 12	SIL; 1; 17	SIL; 2; 14	SIL; 3 Ret	KNO; 1 Ret	KNO; 2; 13	KNO; 3; 12	DON; 1; 12	DON; 2; 16	DON; 3; 12	BRH; 1; 19	BRH; 2; 14	BRH; 3; 14	20th	2
2011	GoMobileUK.com with tech-speed	Chevrolet Cruze LT	BRH; 1; 14	BRH; 2; 15	BRH; 3; 17	DON; 1 Ret	DON; 2; 12	DON; 3; 11	THR; 1; 17	THR; 2; 15	THR; 3; 16	OUL; 1 Ret	OUL; 2 Ret	OUL; 3 Ret	CRO; 1 Ret	CRO; 2; 14	CRO; 3; 17	SNE; 1; 19	SNE; 2 Ret	SNE; 3 Ret	KNO; 1; 17	KNO; 2 Ret	KNO; 3 Ret	ROC; 1; 17	ROC; 2; 19	ROC; 3; 22	BRH; 1; 14	BRH; 2; 20	BRH; 3; 20	SIL; 1; 14	SIL; 2; 20	SIL; 3; 22	27th	0

=== Britcar 24 Hour results ===
Year	Team	Co-Drivers	Car	Car No.	Class	Laps	Pos.	Class Pos.	Ref
2007	(United Kingdom) TH Motorsport	(United Kingdom) Ken Lark (United Kingdom) Tim Saunders (United Kingdom) Nick Starkey	Volkswagen Golf Diesel	79	4	519	13th	**1st**	
2010	(United Kingdom) Mardi Gras Motorsport	(United Kingdom) Desmond Smail (United Kingdom) Alex Osborne (United Kingdom) Kevin George	Honda Integra (fourth generation)	91	4	488	DNF	DNF	
