= Matt Hamilton (racing driver) =

British racing driver (born 1990)

- Nationality: British
- Born: 2 February 1990 (age 36) Hemel Hempstead, England

British Touring Car Championship career
- Debut season: 2009
- Car number: 98
- Former teams: TH Motorsport
- Starts: 18
- Wins: 0
- Poles: 0
- Fastest laps: 0
- Best finish: 21st in 2010

Previous series
- 2009 2008 2007–08 2006: GT4 European Cup; British Formula Ford; Formula Palmer Audi; Formula BMW UK

Matthew Hamilton (born 2 February 1990) is a British racing driver who most recently planned to compete in the 2012 British Touring Car Championship with TH Motorsport before the team's plan was withdrawn.

== Racing career ==
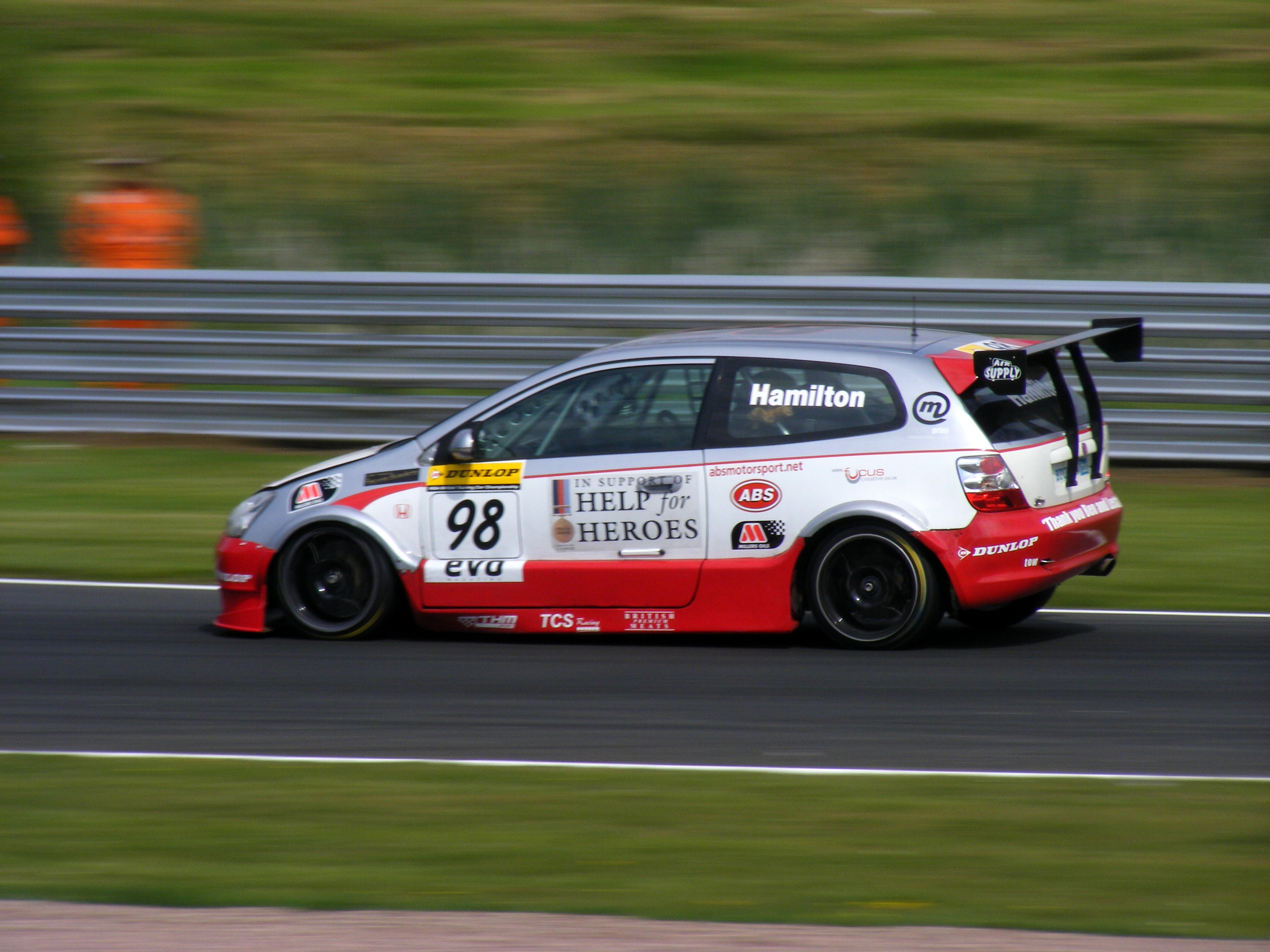
Hamilton driving the TH Motorsport Honda Civic at Oulton Park during the 2010 British Touring Car Championship season.

Hamilton raced in karting between 1999 and 2005. In 2005, he won a Formula BMW scholarship, which gave him entry to the 2006 Formula BMW UK season. He raced in Formula Palmer Audi in 2007. He won the opening race of the season at Silverstone, and was on pole position for the second. A fast-changing red starting light left Hamilton stranded on the startline. He was hit by several unsighted drivers and was spun around; it was then hit broadside at full racing speed by a car from the back of the grid. Hamilton was extracted from the cockpit and airlifted to hospital in Coventry with a broken right femur. In 2008, he competed in FPA and in the British Formula Ford Championship. In 2009, he made his GT racing debut at Silverstone racing in the FIA GT4 European Cup in a Ginetta G50.

Hamilton competed in the final two rounds of the 2009 British Touring Car Championship in a TH Motorsport-prepared Honda Civic, and continued in the same car for 2010. At the season's first meeting at Thruxton he collected funds for Help For Heroes. He was forced to miss the Croft round of the championship due to budgetary issues. Hamilton signed for THM Racing in March 2014 the Watford-based Volkswagen Racing Cup outfit, to compete in the Volkswagen Racing Cup series backed by the giant Volkswagen Group.

== Racing record ==
=== Complete GT4 European Cup results ===
(key) (Races in bold indicate pole position) (Races in italics indicate fastest lap)

Year	Team	Car	Class	1	2	3	4	5	6	7	8	9	10	11	12	DC	Pts
2009	GCR	Ginetta G50	GT4	SIL; 1 Ret	SIL; 2; 5	ADR; 1	ADR; 2	OSC; 1	OSC; 2	SPA; 1	SPA; 2	ZOL; 1	ZOL; 2	ALG; 1	ALG; 2	20th	4

=== Complete British Touring Car Championship results ===
(key) (Races in bold indicate pole position – 1 point awarded in first race) (Races in italics indicate fastest lap – 1 point awarded all races) (* signifies that driver lead race for at least one lap – 1 point awarded all races)

Year	Team	Car	1	2	3	4	5	6	7	8	9	10	11	12	13	14	15	16	17	18	19	20	21	22	23	24	25	26	27	28	29	30	DC	Pts
2009	TH Motorsport Racing with Inten	Honda Civic Type-R	BRH; 1	BRH; 2	BRH; 3	THR; 1	THR; 2	THR; 3	DON; 1	DON; 2	DON; 3	OUL; 1	OUL; 2	OUL; 3	CRO; 1	CRO; 2	CRO; 3	SNE; 1	SNE; 2	SNE; 3	KNO; 1	KNO; 2	KNO; 3	SIL; 1	SIL; 2	SIL; 3	ROC; 1 Ret	ROC; 2 Ret	ROC; 3; 14	BRH; 1 Ret	BRH; 2 Ret	BRH; 3; 13	27th	0
2010	TH Motorsport	Honda Civic Type-R	THR; 1 Ret	THR; 2; 13	THR; 3; 12	ROC; 1; 15	ROC; 2; 14	ROC; 3; 12	BRH; 1; 12	BRH; 2; 9	BRH; 3; 12	OUL; 1 Ret	OUL; 2; 12	OUL; 3; 13	CRO; 1	CRO; 2	CRO; 3	SNE; 1	SNE; 2	SNE; 3	SIL; 1	SIL; 2	SIL; 3	KNO; 1	KNO; 2	KNO; 3	DON; 1	DON; 2	DON; 3	BRH; 1	BRH; 2	BRH; 3	21st	2
