= JAG Communications =

Mobile phone retailer

JAG Communications was Britain's third largest independent mobile phone retailer. It was formed in 1989 in Cornwall by owner John George and the company's first 'store' was a disused 1920s railway carriage in the back garden of George's house at Par.

JAG Communications grew to over 160 outlets in Cornwall, the South of England, and Wales. The company HQ was at Perranporth Airfield, Cornwall and over 600 people were employed across the UK at its height.

In January 2009, JAG Communications underwent prepack administration following Lloyds Bank withdrawing the company’s £2 million overdraft. The assets of the old company were taken over by a new company owned by JAG founder John George and continued to trade under the JAG brand in an attempt to save the bulk of the company and the jobs.

In order to save the company, JAG offered each store manager the chance to run the stores they worked in under licence. Very similar to a franchise program.

In July 2010, JAG agreed to enter a joint venture with Go Mobile, but John George exited in August 2010 and the JAG Brand ceased to exist, with Go Mobile taking on 75 JAG stores, currently run by franchise partners. It was released that George had plans to start a new venture in the air taxi industry and also that he has links to a chain of milkshake shops that are planned to be opened across the South West.
