= Tech-Speed Motorsport =

(United Kingdom) Tech-Speed Motorsport
- Founded: 1984
- Team principal(s): Marvin Humphries
- Current series: British Touring Car Championship
- Former series: MGF Cup
- Noted drivers: (United Kingdom) Joe Girling

Tech-Speed Motorsport is a British auto racing team who compete in the British Touring Car Championship (BTCC) and various historic race categories which was founded in 1984.

The team races under the name of M247 Racing.

MGF Cup - Tech-Speed Motorsport ran two cars for 3 years in the MGF Cup from 1998 to the end of 2000 when run and supported by the manufacturer, this was a very competitive one make series and Tech-Speed ran with drivers Nick Carr and Paul O'Neil with many podium finishes.

== British Touring Car Championship ==
During the early 1990s, Tech-Speed built and prepared various BMW M3 racing cars for teams in the championship, before withdrawing to compete in club-level racing due to the manufacturer dominance during the Super Touring era.

The team returned to the championship in 2001 to run two Peugeot 306 GTi in the BTC-Production class for Paul O'Neill and Annie Templeton.

The team did not return to the championship until 2005, where they had been in charge of preparing the bio-ethanol Vauxhall Astra Coupé. The car was used by female racer Fiona Leggate. Leggate raced the Astra for two seasons. Paul O'Neill also drove the car once at the 2006 season finale.

In 2007, the team ran a Vauxhall Astra Sport Hatch for Turkish racer Erkut Kızılırmak under the Arkas Racing banner. The following season, Kızılırmak was joined by Martyn Bell in a two-car assault on the championship.

In 2009 the team switched to two former Team Eurotech Honda Integras for Martyn Bell and Paul O'Neill under the Team Sunshine.co.uk banner.

Due to problems relating to an injury sustained in 2008, Bell was replaced by John George for the 2010 season.

In 2011, the team switched their Honda Integras for a pair of Super 2000 Chevrolet Cruzes, run under the GoMobileUK.com with tech-speed banner.

Due to budgetary issues, tech-speed missed the start of the 2012 season. However, the team announced their intention to return to the series with a turbocharged Chevrolet Cruze for former Dunlop Production Touring Car Championship driver Joe Girling. The team failed to make an appearance.

During the 2013 season the team ran under the name of their sponsor M247 Racing.
