= BTC-T Vauxhall Astra Sport Hatch =

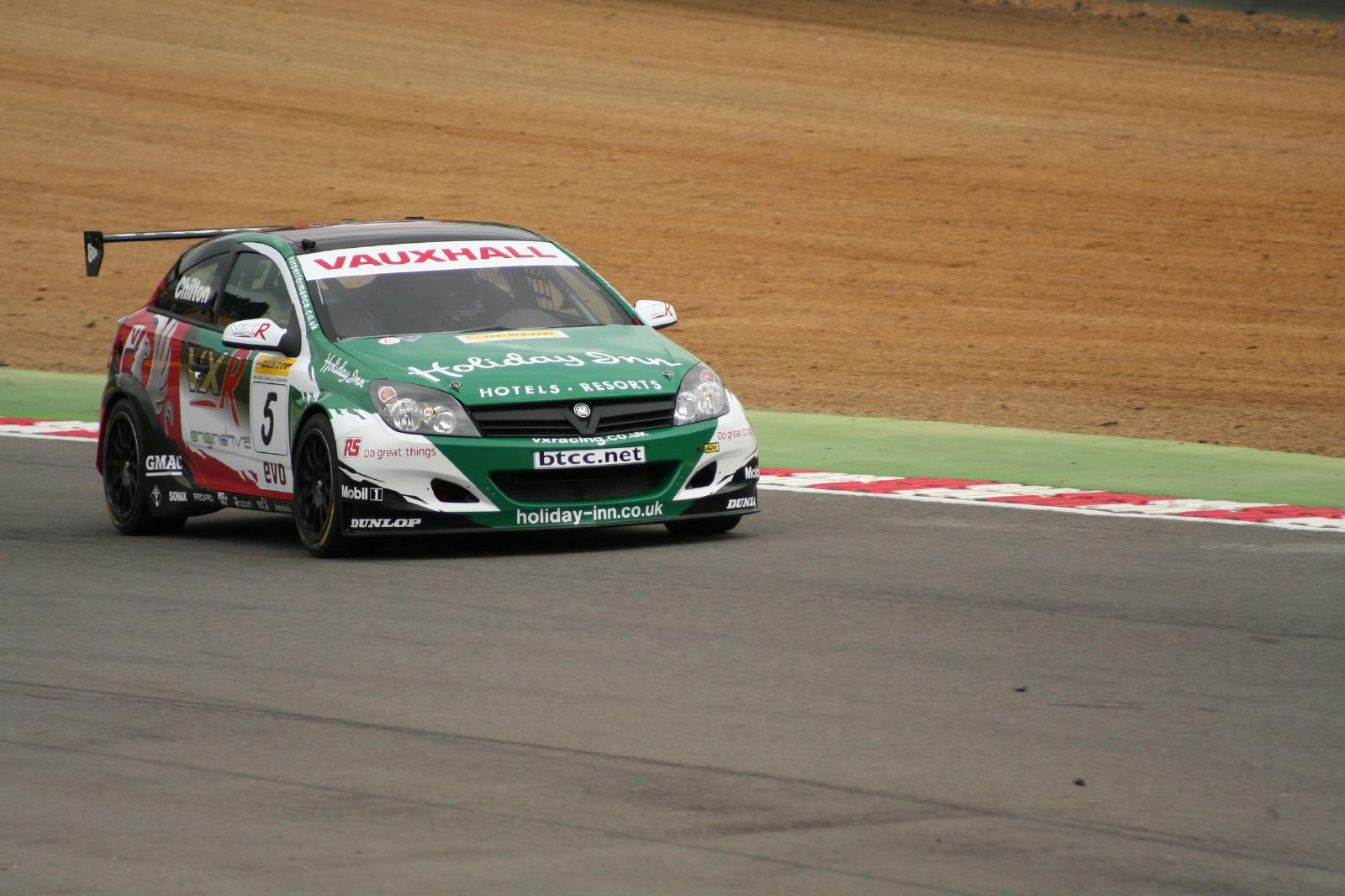
- Category: BTCC
- Constructor: Triple 8 Race Engineering

Technical specifications
- Chassis: Vauxhall Astra Mk V
- Engine: 2,000 cc (122.0 cu in) In-line 4 NA front-mounted, FWD
- Transmission: 6-speed Sequential
- Tyres: Dunlop

Competition history
- Notable entrants: VXRacing; Arkas Racing
- Debut: 2005 BTCC at Donington Park
| Races | Wins | Poles | F/Laps |
|---|---|---|---|
| 117 (2005-2008) | 10 | 5 | 9 |
- Teams' Championships: 0
- Constructors' Championships: 1 (2005)
- Drivers' Championships: 0

The BTC-T Vauxhall Astra Sport Hatch is a BTC-Touring class racing car that was built for the 2005 British Touring Car Championship season by Triple 8 Race Engineering, who ran Vauxhall's official works program.

== Works history ==
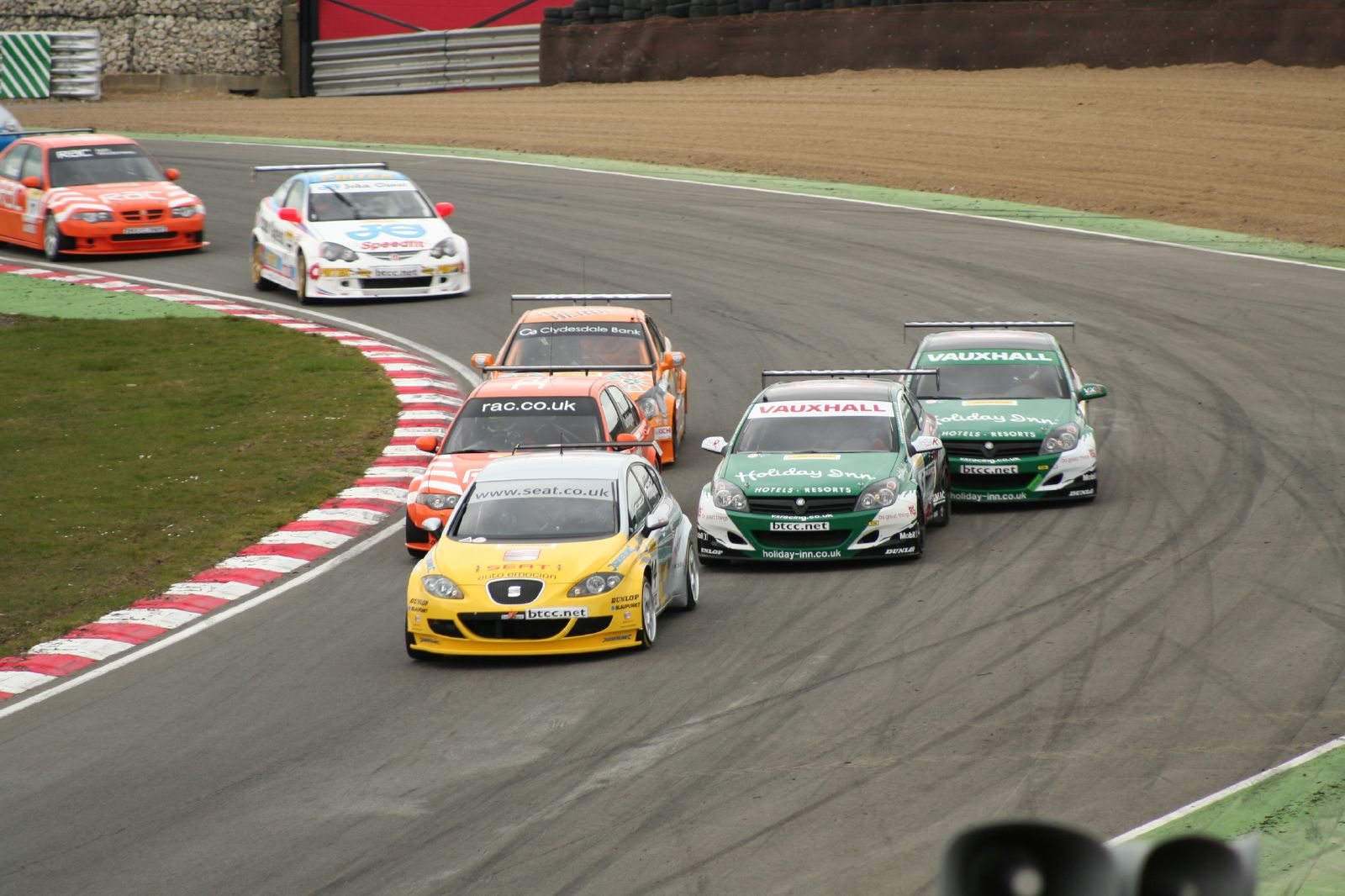
VXRacing BTC-T Vauxhall Astra Sport Hatch at Brands Hatch

After campaigning the BTC-T Vauxhall Astra Coupe for 4 years, VX Racing took the decision to replace the car with the brand-new Astra SportHatch for the 2005 BTCC season. An experimental BTC-T spec Vectra had been built in 2003, but the experiment was not continued due to the weight of the car. Replacing such a successful car proved difficult, however; and the car only won ten out of the sixty races it contested as a works entry, in the hands of Yvan Muller, Colin Turkington and Fabrizio Giovanardi. The emergence of the BTC-T Honda Integra Type R proved to be a challenge too far for Vauxhall, despite a successful debut victory, and Vauxhall's 100th BTCC win at Knockhill in 2006. Despite the dominance of Matt Neal's Integra, however, the car did deliver the 2005 Manufacturer's championship to Vauxhall, as Team Dynamics were not competing in this championship.

== Later career ==
After the car's replacement with the Super 2000-spec Vectra, the Turkish driver Erkut Kizilirmak bought three of the four chassis, and used them for his Arkas Racing team in the BTCC for 2007, with some occasional races in the Turkish Touring Car Championship. In 2008, Erkut expanded the BTCC effort to a two-car team, being joined by Martyn Bell.

== Chassis history ==
Chassis CH12

- 2005 – Yvan Muller (Rounds 1-3)/Two Seater
- 2006 – Two Seater/Erkut Kizilirmak (Rounds 13-15/18-21)
- 2007 onwards – Two Seater

Chassis CH14

- 2005 – Colin Turkington (Rounds 1-12)
- 2006 onwards – Unused

Chassis CH15

- 2005/06 – Gavin Smith
- 2007 – Erkut Kizilirmak (Turkish Touring Car Championship)
- 2008 – Erkut Kizilirmak (Rounds 10-30)

Chassis CH16

- 2005 – Yvan Muller (Rounds 4–30)
- 2006 – Fabrizio Giovanardi
- 2007/08 – Erkut Kizilirmak (Rounds 1–9, written off at Donington Park)

Chassis CH17

- 2005 – Colin Turkington (Rounds 13–30)
- 2006/07 – Tom Chilton
- 2008 – Martyn Bell
