= Ludo Lacroix =

French motor racing engineer (born 1972)

Personal information
- Born: April 1972 (age 53) France

Sport
- Sport: Supercars
- Team: Triple Eight Racing; Triple Eight Race Engineering; Dick Johnson Racing; Nulon Racing

Ludovic "Ludo" Lacroix is a French motor racing engineer currently engineering Richie Stanaway for PremiAir Nulon Racing in the Supercars Championship.

== Career ==
=== Early career ===
Lacroix began his career in 1990 in France, and afterwards had stints in British Touring Car Championship and DTM. He joined Triple Eight Racing in England in 1999. In 2002, Lacroix was the race engineer for Laurent Aïello in the Deutsche Tourenwagen Masters. Aïello would go on to win seven races and the championship for Abt Sportsline in that season.

=== Triple Eight Race Engineering ===
Lacroix moved to Australia in 2003 to join the then-Australian offshoot, Triple Eight Race Engineering as a technical director and head of the engineering department.

In 2008, Lacroix designed the aerodynamics for the new Ford FG Falcon raced by Triple Eight.

At the 2013 Bathurst 1000, Lacroix engineered a Triple Eight wildcard entry #10 Holden VF Commodore driven by Mattias Ekström and Andy Priaulx which ultimately finished in 10th place.

In 2016, he engineered the #888 Holden VF Commodore driven by Craig Lowndes. After announcing his impending departure part-way through the season, he was stood down by team principal Roland Dane and replaced in this role by John McGregor.

=== DJR Team Penske ===
In 2017 Lacroix moved to DJR Team Penske becoming the engineer on Scott McLaughlin's Ford FG X Falcon.

=== Nulon Racing ===
In 2024 Lacroix moved to PremiAir Nulon Racing to become an engineer for Tim Slade.
