= Erkut Kızılırmak =

Turkish racing driver (born 1969)

- Kızılırmak at Rockingham Motor Speedway in 2008
- Nationality: (Turkey) Turkish
- Born: 14 September 1969 (age 57) İzmir, Turkey

Previous series
- 2006: British Touring Car Championship

Erkut Kızılırmak (born 14 September 1969) is a Turkish racing driver. He started racing in rallying in 1992 and switched to touring cars in 2002, at the age of 32.

In 2005, Kızılırmak won the Turkish Touring Car Championship, in a Vauxhall Astra Coupé formerly raced by Yvan Muller in the BTCC. He also made an appearance in the Turkish round of the World Touring Car Championship in 2005 driving an ex works SEAT Toledo for the GR Asia team alongside Tom Coronel.

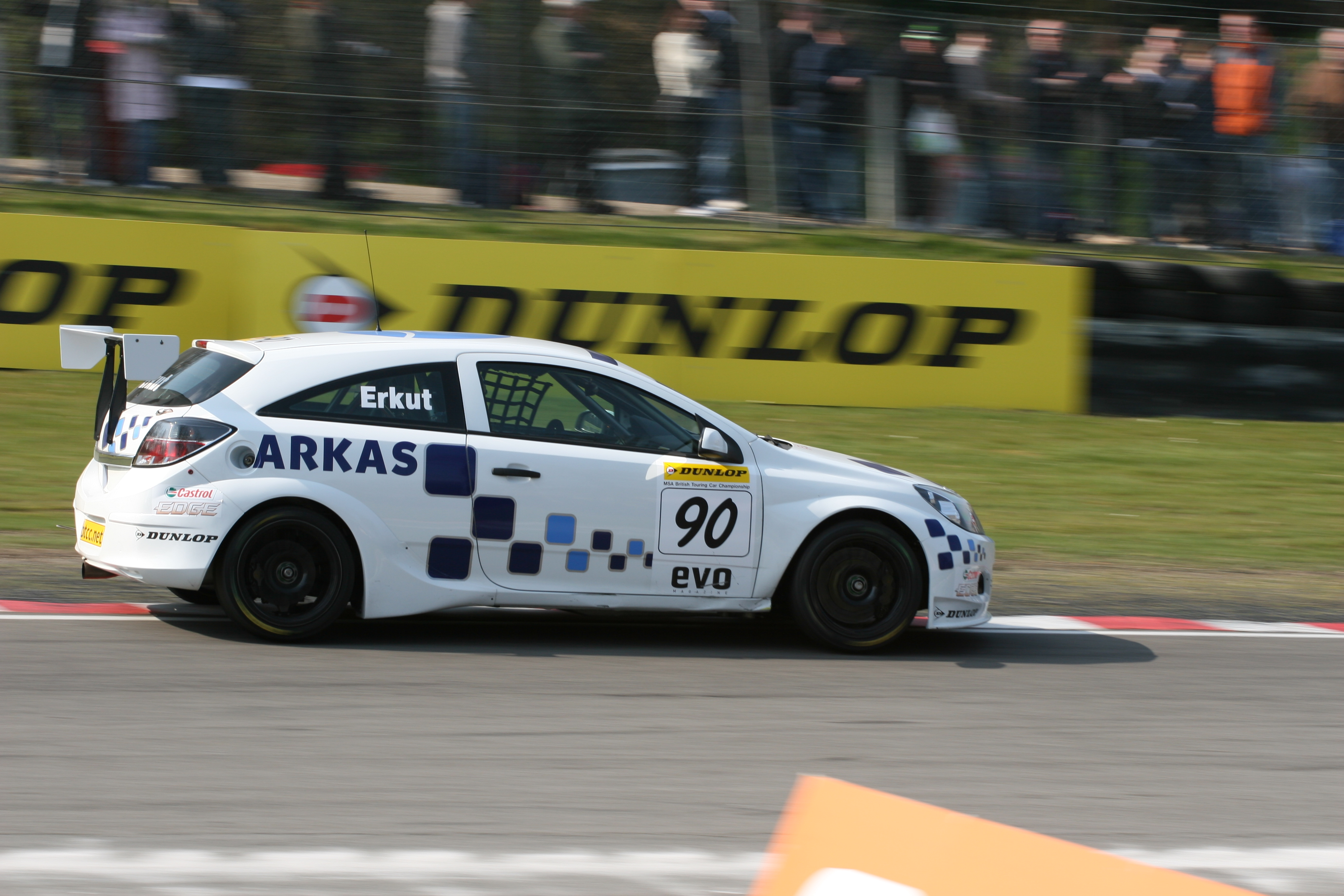
Kizilirmak driving the Arkas Racing Vauxhall Astra at Brands Hatch during the 2007 British Touring Car Championship season.

Kızılırmak's connections with the series and the Triple 8 Race Engineering company, increased in 2006, with Kızılırmak becoming the first Turkish driver to compete in the BTCC when he raced at Croft in a BTC-T Vauxhall Astra Sport Hatch, converted from one of the team's show cars. He also competed at Snetterton, where he achieved his best result - 13th.

In 2007, Kızılırmak announced that he would be competing in the full BTCC championship, in an VX Racing Astra Sport Hatch. His Arkas Team united with Tech-Speed Motorsport to run the car.

Two tenth-places in the high-attrition round 8 at Brands Hatch gave Kızılırmak his only two overall points of the season, while he finished ninth in the Independents' Cup, showing some speed and gusto in a 2006-spec car.

Kızılırmak also won the first two races of the 2007 Turkish Touring Car Championship.

In 2008, Kızılırmak returned for another season in the BTCC. This time as part of a two car team alongside Martyn Bell with the renamed Team Arkas Racing with Sunshine.co.uk. His best result of the year was a tenth-place finish in round six at Rockingham Speedway, giving him his one championship point of the year.

== Racing record ==
=== World Touring Car Championship ===
(key) (Races in bold indicate pole position) (Races in italics indicate fastest lap)

Year	Team	Car	1	2	3	4	5	6	7	8	9	10	11	12	13	14	15	16	17	18	19	20	DC	Pts
2005	GR Asia	SEAT Toledo Cupra	ITA; 1	ITA; 2	FRA; 1	FRA; 2	GBR; 1	GBR; 2	SMR; 1	SMR; 2	MEX; 1	MEX; 2	BEL; 1	BEL; 2	GER; 1	GER; 2	TUR; 1 Ret	TUR; 2 DNS	ESP; 1	ESP; 2	MAC; 1	MAC; 2	-	**0**

=== British Touring Car Championship ===
(key) (Races in bold indicate pole position - 1 point awarded in first race) (Races in italics indicate fastest lap - 1 point awarded all races) (* signifies that driver lead race for at least one lap - 1 point awarded all races)

Year	Team	Car	1	2	3	4	5	6	7	8	9	10	11	12	13	14	15	16	17	18	19	20	21	22	23	24	25	26	27	28	29	30	DC	Pts
2006	VX Racing	Vauxhall Astra Sport Hatch	BRH; 1	BRH; 2	BRH; 3	MON; 1	MON; 2	MON; 3	OUL; 1	OUL; 2	OUL; 3	THR; 1	THR; 2	THR; 3	CRO; 1; 15	CRO; 2 Ret	CRO; 3; 15	DON; 1	DON; 2	DON; 3	SNE; 1 Ret	SNE; 2; 13	SNE; 3; 14	KNO; 1	KNO; 2	KNO; 3	BRH; 1	BRH; 2	BRH; 3	SIL; 1	SIL; 2	SIL; 3	26th	0
2007	Arkas Racing	Vauxhall Astra Sport Hatch	BRH; 1; 14	BRH; 2; 12	BRH; 3; 15	ROC; 1; 16	ROC; 2 DNS	ROC; 3; 11	THR; 1; 17	THR; 2; 13	THR; 3; 14	CRO; 1; 13	CRO; 2 Ret	CRO; 3 Ret	OUL; 1; 14	OUL; 2 Ret	OUL; 3; 11	DON; 1; 14	DON; 2; 15	DON; 3; 13	SNE; 1; 11	SNE; 2 Ret	SNE; 3; 11	BRH; 1; 10	BRH; 2; 10	BRH; 3 Ret	KNO; 1	KNO; 2	KNO; 3	THR; 1; 15	THR; 2 Ret	THR; 3 Ret	24th	2
2008	Arkas Racing with sunshine.co.uk	Vauxhall Astra Sport Hatch	BRH; 1; 19	BRH; 2; 16	BRH; 3; 17	ROC; 1; 17	ROC; 2; 18	ROC; 3; 10	DON; 1; 16	DON; 2 Ret	DON; 3 DNS	THR; 1; 22	THR; 2; 19	THR; 3; 14	CRO; 1; 16	CRO; 2; 15	CRO; 3; 13	SNE; 1; 18	SNE; 2 Ret	SNE; 3; 13	OUL; 1	OUL; 2	OUL; 3	KNO; 1	KNO; 2	KNO; 3	SIL; 1; 18	SIL; 2 DNS	SIL; 3; 17	BRH; 1; 18	BRH; 2; 17	BRH; 3 Ret	22nd	1
