= Triple Eight Racing =

British motor racing team

(United Kingdom) Triple Eight Racing
- Founded: 1996
- Folded: 2018
- Base: Buntingford, Hertfordshire, England
- Former series: BTCC Formula Renault BARC; British GT Championship; Blancpain Endurance
- Teams' Championships: BTCC – Manufacturers: 2001, 2002, 2003, 2004, 2005; 2007, 2008, 2009, 2014; BTCC – Teams: 2001, 2002, 2003, 2004, 2008, 2009; BTCC – Independents: 2011
- Drivers' Championships: BTCC: 2001: Jason Plato; 2002, 2004: James Thompson; 2003: Yvan Muller; 2007, 2008: Fabrizio Giovanardi; BTCC – Independents: 2011: James Nash
- Website: http://www.tripleeight.co.uk/

Team logo used until 2015

Triple Eight Racing (888 Racing) was a motorsports team formed in 1996 as Triple Eight Race Engineering, which competed in the British Touring Car Championship and the British GT Championship.

The team's original focus was to design, build and race Vauxhalls on behalf of the General Motors brand in the British Touring Car Championship (BTCC). A close working alliance developed during a decade of success and Triple Eight became Vauxhall's technical partner for motorsport. In 2009, Vauxhall Motors ended its support for the BTCC, however the team continued to compete using Vauxhalls until the end of the 2011 season. From the 2012 season, Triple Eight began to build and race MG6 GT cars on behalf of MG, in a revival of the marque in the BTCC. The following year, the team entered the British GT Championship, running a pair of BMW Z4 GT3s.

Prior to the start of the 2015 season, the team rebranded itself as Triple Eight Racing across all its motorsport programs, introducing a new team name and logo.

== British Touring Car Championship ==
=== Vauxhall manufacturer entry (1997–2009) ===
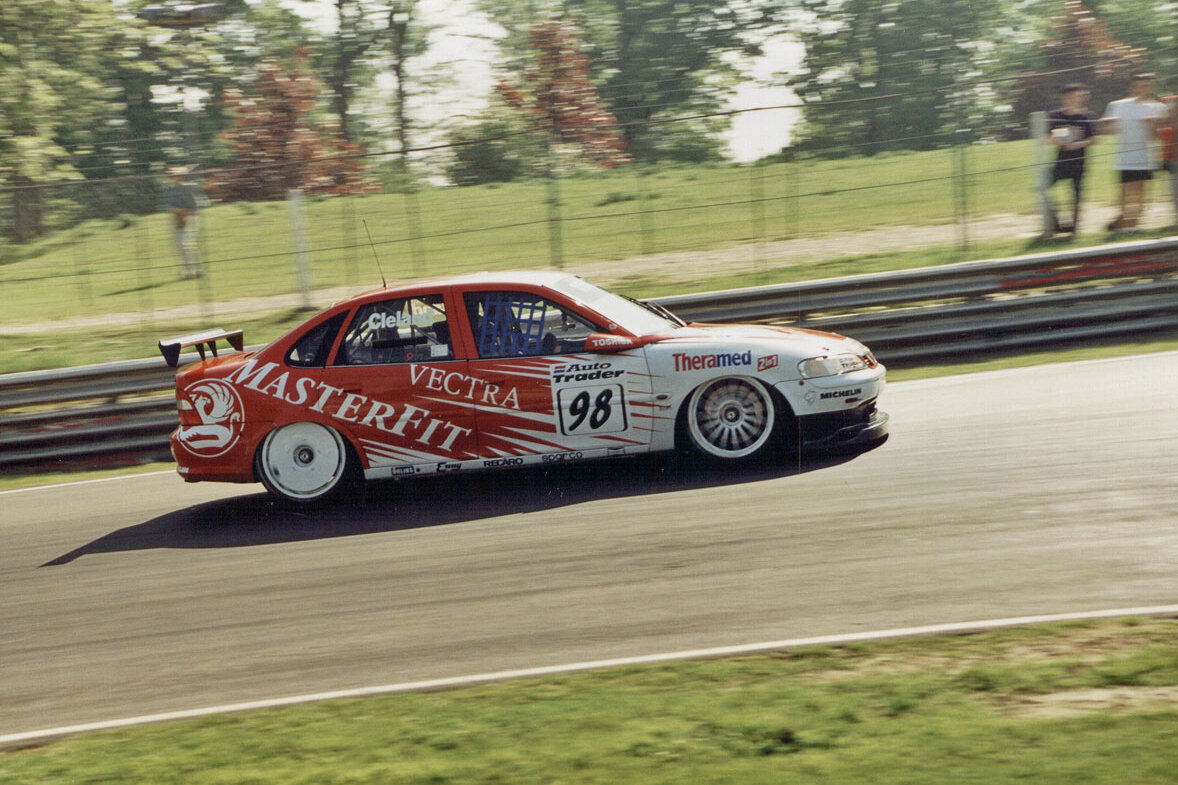
John Cleland driving a Triple 8 prepared Vectra at Brands Hatch

==== Vauxhall Vectra (1997–2000) ====
Triple Eight was founded by Derek Warwick, Roland Dane and Ian Harrison in late 1996. The team made its BTCC debut in 1997 by running the works Vauxhall team left by RML and providing Vectras for 2 time Vauxhall champion John Cleland and team owner Derek Warwick. The season was not successful with the Vectra uncompetitive because of aerodynamics which had been holomogated for the Vectra model across all Supertouring championships in 1996 and was primarily set up for the faster French, German and Italian tracks; where the Opel Vectra was much more competitive. John Cleland and Derek Warwick finished 12th and 14th in the championship with their best race results being a 5th. Triple Eight finished 8th in the teams' and manufacturers' (as Vauxhall) championships.

1998 would be a much more competitive season, Triple Eight changed the aerodynamic package and the Vauxhall Vectra became a much more competitive car, after the FIA Touring Car Bureau agreed that Vauxhall could homologate a differing aerodynamic package to Opel's. Triple Eight's first BTCC win came at round 5 at Donington Park after John Cleland achieved a great start and never lost the lead. This would also be John Cleland's first victory since his championship year in 1995, and Vauxhall's first since James Thompson at Snetterton 1996. John Cleland would win again at Donington Park at round 12 in one of the best BTCC races ever witnessed. Derek Warwick would also take his first BTCC victory at Knockhill. While the season was successful, it was not smooth. John Cleland suffered a crash at Snetterton with reigning champion Alain Menu causing cracked ribs and heavy bruising causing him to miss the next round at Thruxton. His place was taken by Brazilian driver Flavio Figueiredo. John Cleland and Derek Warwick finished 8th and 9th in the championship. Triple Eight finished 5th in the teams' and manufacturers' award.

1999 saw Derek Warwick retire from full-time racing and to focus on running the team. His place was taken by Frenchmen Yvan Muller moving from Audi. The Vectra went through some changes as well for the season. Ludo Lacroix joined the team in 1999. The season only saw one win from Vauxhall by Yvan Muller at Brands Hatch round 7. Yvan Muller finished an eventual 6th in the championship, however John Cleland had a much harder season finishing 13th and announcing his retirement after 11 successful seasons with Vauxhall including 2 championships in 1989 (Vauxhall Astra) and 1995 (Vauxhall Cavalier). 2000 saw the final year of the Supertouring era and many of the manufacturers depart the BTCC (these included Renault (Williams) – 1997 champions, Volvo (TWR) – 1998 champions and Nissan (RML Group) 1999 champions) leaving Ford (Prodrive), Honda (WSR) and Vauxhall (Triple Eight). Every team increased to three cars. Triple Eight had Yvan Muller, Jason Plato (departing Renault) and Vincent Radermecker (departing Volvo) Ford were the dominant manufacturer throughout the season with all three Fords finishing 1–2–3 in the drivers' championship (Alain Menu – Anthony Reid – Rickard Rydell) with Yvan Muller and Jason Plato finishing 4th and 5th with Vincent Radermecker finishing 10th. Triple Eight finished 2nd and 3rd in the teams and manufacturers award.

Triple Eight competed twice in the Bathurst 1000 in Australia. In 1997, two Vectras were entered for John Cleland/James Thompson and Derek Warwick/Peter Brock, while in 1998, Cleland and Warwick shared a car with Russell Ingall and Greg Murphy driving the second car.

==== Vauxhall Astra Coupé (2001–04) ====
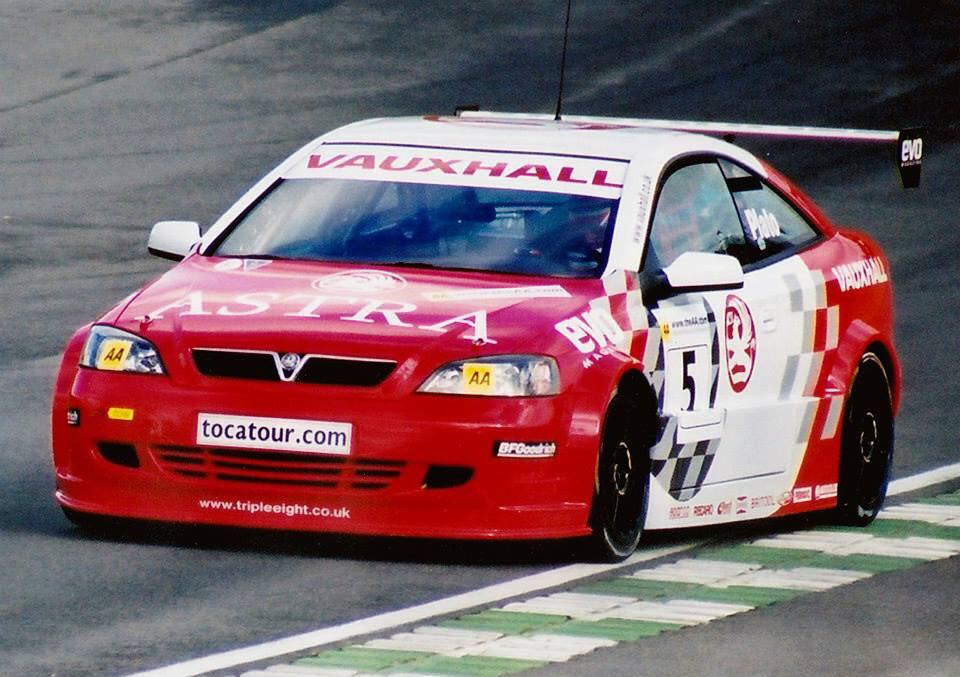
Plato competing in the Astra at Brands Hatch in 2001

2001 saw the arrival of the new touring car regulation. This system was designed to make the cars much less expensive to build and run. Vauxhall replaced the Vectra with the Astra Coupe for 2001 and would so until 2004. Yvan Muller and Jason Plato retained their seats at Vauxhall and were the class of the field. The title came down between Yvan Muller and Jason Plato in the final race. After an early spin by Plato, Yvan Muller looked comfortable to take the title, until two excursions at Clearways caused an oil leak and fire for Yvan Muller leaving Plato champion. Triple Eight finished 1st in the teams and manufacturers award. 2002 saw the departure of Jason Plato from the BTCC to race in the British ASCAR stock car championship. Yvan Muller retained his seat at Vauxhall and was more determined to take the title. Plato's seat at Vauxhall was filled by James Thompson moving up from egg:sport. The season saw the Astra Coupe again the car to beat against rivals MG, Honda, Peugeot and Proton, however the Astra suffered reliability issues throughout the season. Despite this, Yvan Muller and James Thompson and for much of the season Matt Neal (egg:sport) fought for the championship. In the end James Thompson won the championship from Yvan Muller and Matt Neal. Triple Eight again finished 1st in the teams and manufacturers award.

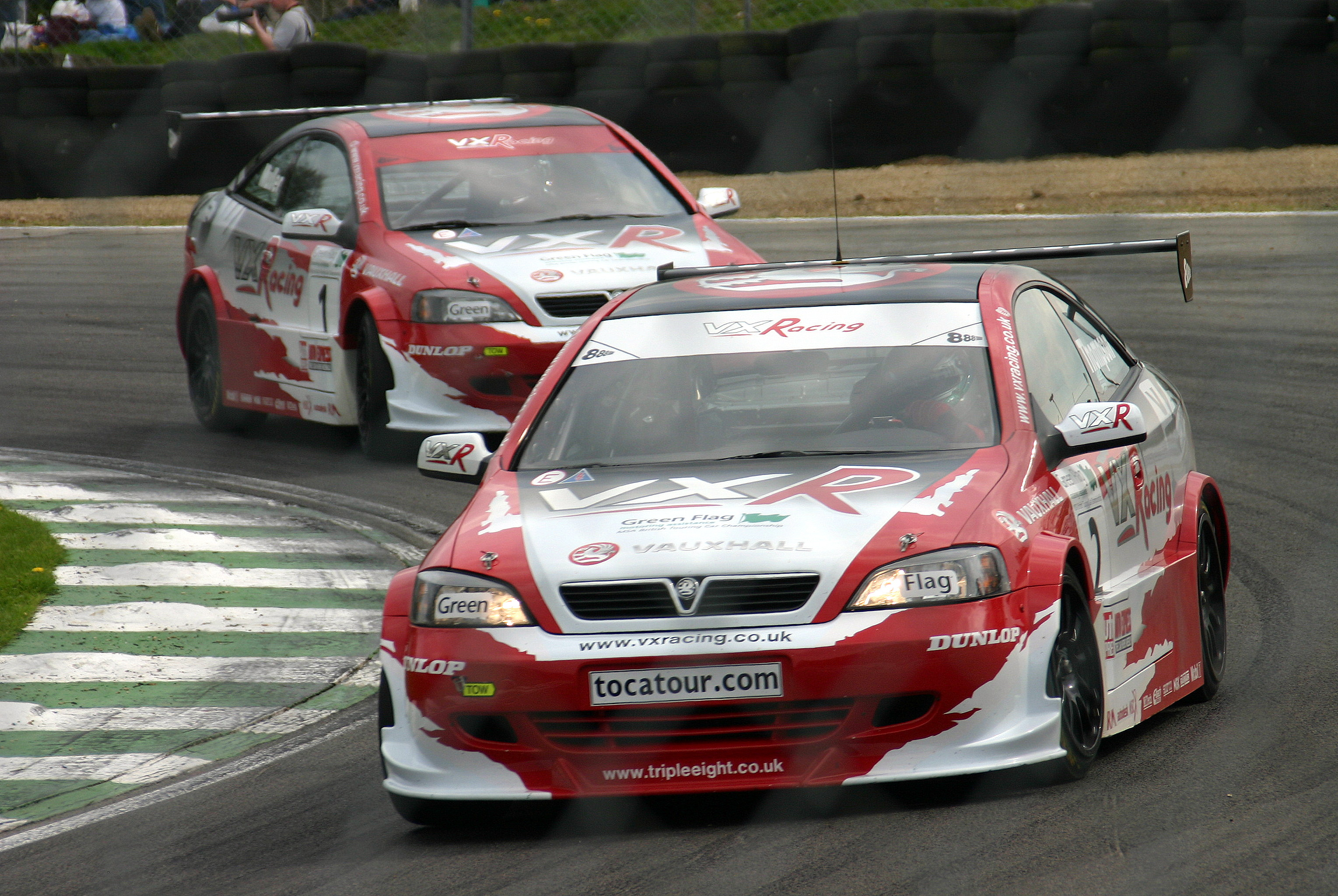
The Vauxhalls of Thompson and Muller at Brands Hatch in 2004

2003 saw Vauxhall increase to three cars with James Thompson, Yvan Muller and Paul O'Neill moving up from egg:sport. Vauxhall also changed the team name to VX Racing standing for the new Vauxhall tuning company VXR. The season saw the Astra challenged by Honda and MG throughout the year, however Yvan Muller and James Thompson again challenged each other for the title. In the end Yvan Muller secured the title. Triple Eight again won the teams and manufacturers award. 2004 would be the final season for the Astra Coupe. Yvan Muller and James Thompson were joined by 2003 Production class champion Luke Hines. The Astra Coupe faced a huge challenge against Honda, MG and newcomers Seat who had Jason Plato returning to the championship. Despite the Astra Coupe at times during the season not the quickest car its consistency allowed Yvan Muller and James Thompson for the third year in a row fight for the title. In the end James Thompson won the title by one point from Yvan Muller. The Astra Coupe would be known as the most successful car to race in the BTCC. For the fourth year in a row Triple Eight won the teams and manufacturers award.

===== egg:sport (2001–02) =====
For 2001 Triple Eight ran a second team to run alongside the Vauxhall Motorsport known as egg:sport using the Astra Coupe. 2001 saw egg:sport run two cars for James Thompson and newcomer Phil Bennett. James Thompson won four races while Phil Bennett won three races. Andy Priaulx raced at Oulton Park for egg:sport replacing Phil Bennett after an altercation with Steve Soper caused him to be given a round ban. James Thompson and Phil Bennett finished 3rd and 4th in the championship. egg:sport finished 2nd in the teams award and 1st along with Vauxhall Motorsport in the manufacturers award as Vauxhall.

2002 saw a new driver lineup for the season. Matt Neal returned to the BTCC after a year in the ETCC. His teammate would be Paul O'Neill who moved up from the Production Class. Matt Neal and Paul O'Neill showed promise throughout the season with Matt Neal a challenger for the title for much of the season by winning three races and Paul O'Neill winning his first race and on the pace during the year. Matt Neal and Paul O'Neill finished 3rd and 8th in the championship. egg:sport finished 3rd in the teams award and 1st in the manufacturers award

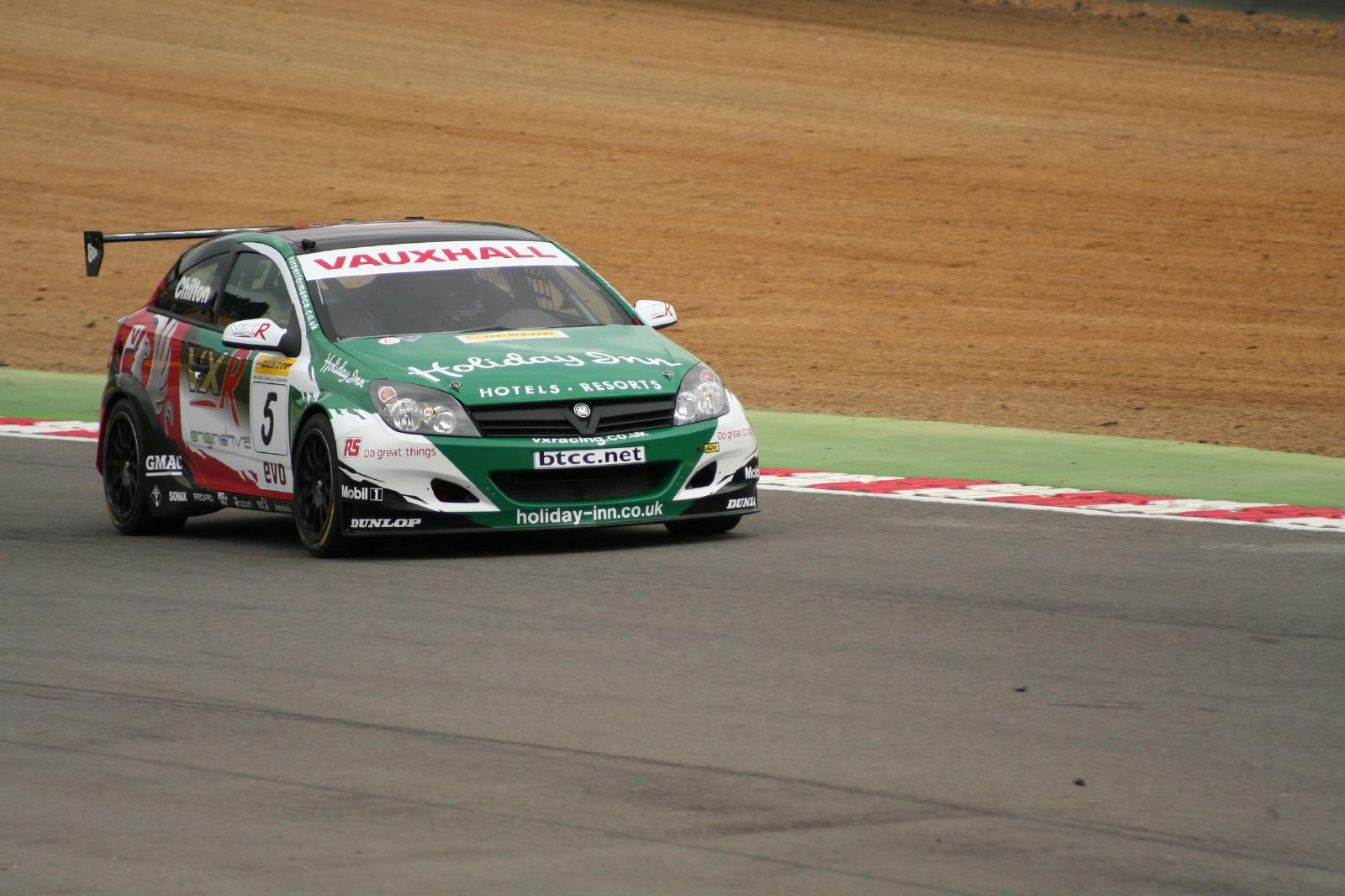
Tom Chilton driving a Triple 8 prepared Vauxhall Astra at Brands Hatch circuit

==== Vauxhall Astra Sport Hatch (2005–06) ====
2005 saw the introduction to the Vauxhall Astra Sport Hatch to replace the successful Astra Coupe. While the Astra Coupe was able to soak up all the challenges it faced throughout the four years the Astra Sport Hatch faced much harder opposition including the new Honda Integra Type R prepared by Team Halfords (Team Dynamics). Yvan Muller retained his seat at Triple Eight and Vauxhall, James Thompson would not return to the championship to retain his title, instead setting his sights on the new WTCC. His place was taken Colin Turkington moving from West Surrey Racing and MG while a third car was prepared for Gavin Smith. While Vauxhall were expected to once again win the championship, the Astra Sport Hatch was outclassed by the Integra Type R of Matt Neal and Dan Eaves. While Yvan Muller challenged Matt Neal for the title, Matt Neal managed to complete all 30 races without a single retirement. Yvan Muller finished 2nd in the championship with 6 race wins, Colin Turkington finished 6th in the championship with 2 race wins while Gavin Smith finished 10th in the championship. Triple Eight managed to win the manufacturers award for a 5th year in a row from Seat who were somewhat outclassed by both Team Halfords and VX Racing. Triple Eight finished 2nd in the teams award.

2006 saw a new look for Triple Eight and Vauxhall. Holiday Inn became a main sponsor for VX Racing and the driver lineup also saw new changes. After seven successful seasons and a championship (2003) Yvan Muller left VX Racing and the BTCC to compete with Seat in the WTCC. Colin Turkington also left the team to return to West Surrey Racing. Yvan Muller's place was taken by Italian Fabrizio Giovanardi moving from the WTCC and Colin Turkington's place was taken by Tom Chilton moving from Honda. Gavin Smith retained his seat at VX Racing. The season was a disappointing one for Triple Eight with the Astra Sport Hatch not quite as competitive as its competitors, again outclassed by the Integra Type R and Seat with its new Leon. Tom Chilton struggled to learn the car, Fabrizio Giovanardi also had issues trying to learn the car and tracks. While the dominance was missing from the previous seasons there were highlights throughout the season. Fabrizio Giovanardi's first win happened to be Vauxhall's 100th BTCC race win. He then won another race at Brands Hatch, Tom Chilton and Gavin Smith went through the season without a win. Triple Eight finished 2nd and 3rd in the manufacturers and teams award.

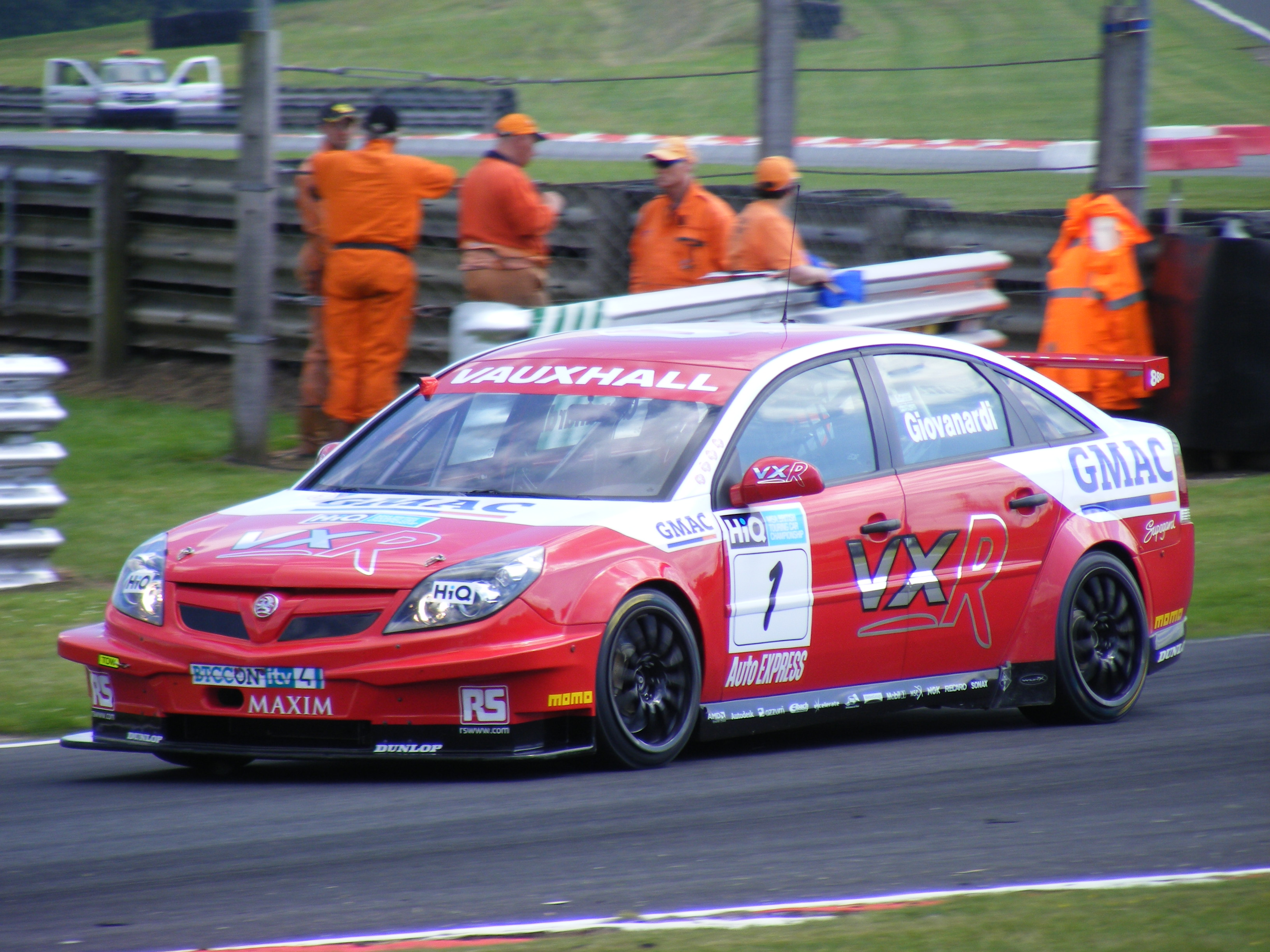
Fabrizio Giovanardi driving a Vauxhall Vectra for the VX Racing team

==== Vauxhall Vectra (2007–09) ====
2007 saw the start of a new era for the BTCC as the series adopted the S2000 regulations as used in the World Touring Car Championship. The changes in regulations meant that the Vauxhall Astra Sport Hatch was replaced by the Vauxhall Vectra. VX Racing downsized to a two-car team, retaining Fabrizio Giovanardi and Tom Chilton. 2007 saw the full potential of Fabrizio Giovanardi, winning 10 races and the title against Seat rival Jason Plato. While the season was successful for Giovanardi, Tom Chilton again had a challenging season without a win and an eventual 9th in the championship. For the final round at Thruxton, the championship difference was 9 points (Jason Plato to Fabrizio Giovanardi) Both teams brought in a third driver. Seat brought in Tom Coronel, while Vauxhall brought in Alain Menu, the 1997 champion with Renault and 2000 champion with Ford. Triple Eight won the manufacturers award and 2nd in the teams award.

For 2008 Triple Eight returned to a three-car operation. Fabrizio Giovanardi retained his seat as defending champion, Tom Chilton and Matt Neal exchanged seats at Triple Eight and Team Dynamics with Tom Chilton moving to Team Dynamics and Matt Neal to Triple Eight. The third car was taken by Tom Onslow-Cole moving from Team RAC (WSR). The season was somewhat untroubling for Giovanardi to another championship ahead of Jason Plato. Matt Neal finished 5th with one win and Tom Onslow-Cole finished 6th with two wins. Triple Eight finished 1st in the manufacturers and teams award.

2009 saw new changes to Triple Eight. Triple Eight were the only team with manufacturer support. Fabrizio Giovanardi and Matt Neal retained their seats at VX Racing while Tom Onslow-Cole moved to drive part-time for Team AON Ford. His place was taken by Andrew Jordan. Despite the success of the Vectra and Giovanardi it would not continue into 2009. While Giovanardi challenged for the title he was outclassed by Colin Turkington in the RAC BMW (WSR) and Jason Plato with RML Chevrolet. Fabrizio Giovanardi finished the season 3rd while Matt Neal and Andrew Jordan finished 4th and 10th in the championship. Triple Eight finished 1st in the teams and manufacturers award. 2009 would also witness the final year with a works Vauxhall team. Vauxhall pulled out of the sport due to lack of official manufacturers and the economic crisis.

=== Independent entry (2010–11) ===
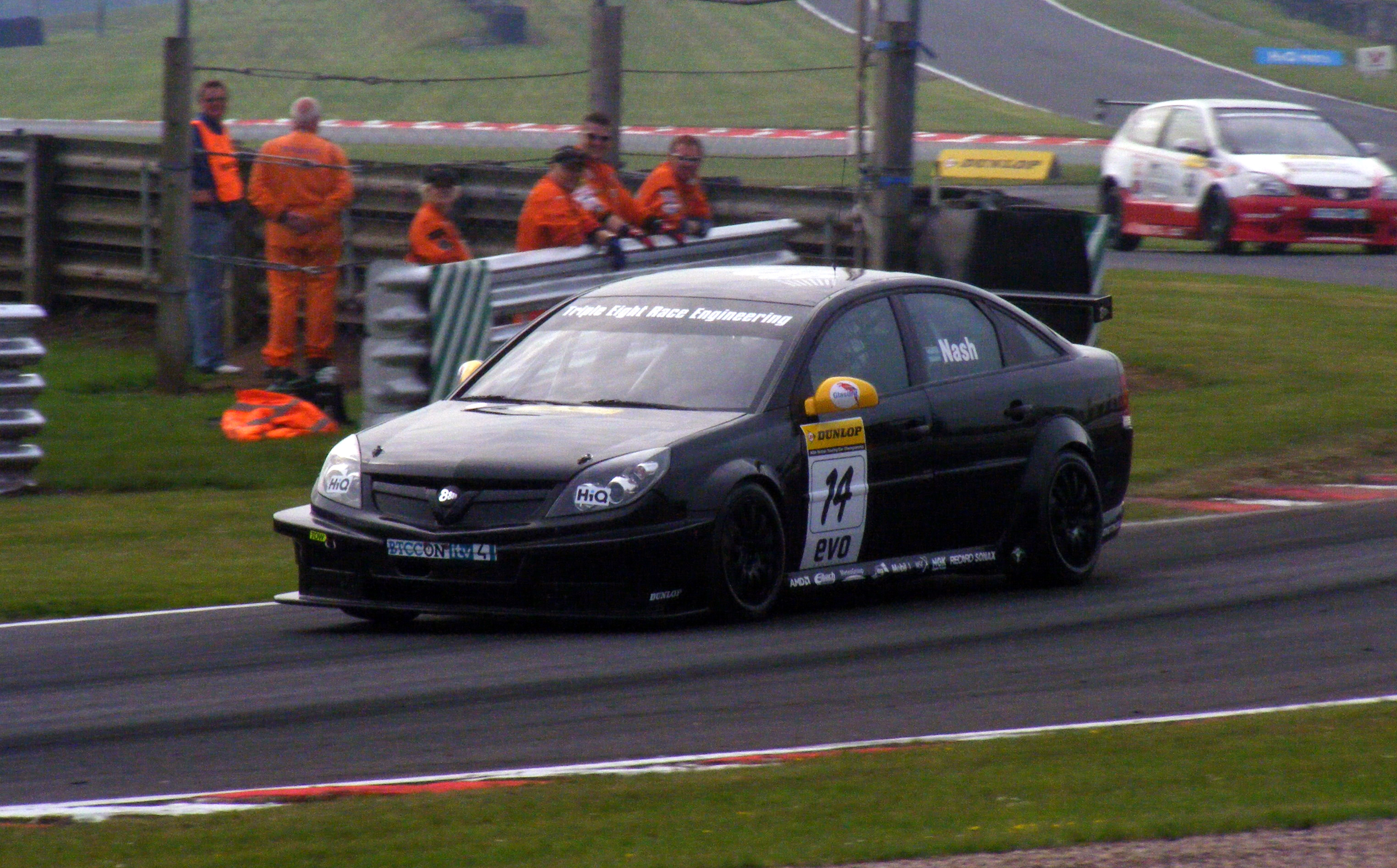
James Nash driving a Vauxhall Vectra in Triple 8's Independent livery

==== Vauxhall Vectra C (2010–11) ====
On 23 March 2010 at the BTCC Media Day at Brands Hatch, Triple 8 Race Engineering appeared on the official entry list for the 2010 season. Although without manufacturer support from Vauxhall, Triple Eight intended to run a pair of Vauxhall Vectras in the Independent category.

For 2010 Triple Eight had hired Renault Cup champion Phil Glew and a last minute deal with Fabrizio Giovanardi. Uniq would be the main sponsor along with WD40 and DUNLOP. The season started sensationally for Giovanardi, winning the first two races at Thruxton and a fifth in the final race gave him a lead in the championship. Phil Glew also started well finishing in the top 10 in both races only to retire in the final race. While Triple Eight were looking like contenders for the championship, the team was turned on its head. Before the next round at Rockingham, Uniq pulled out sponsorship, as a result a lack of money meant that both Fabrizio Giovanardi and Phil Glew were forced to leave the team. James Nash was hired to race for the remainder of the season and Triple Eight ran a second car at times during the season driven by Daniel Lloyd (Round 5), Jeff Smith (Round 8) and Sam Tordoff (Round 10). The season was a disappointment for Triple Eight with changes in sponsors and lack of results, a third at Oulton Park by James Nash was only the real result of the season since Giovanardi's two wins at Thruxton. James Nash finished the season 8th and 12th in the Independents Trophy and outright championship. Fabrizio Giovanardi finished 12th and 14th in the Independents Trophy and outright championship. Phil Glew finished 14th and 16th in the Independents Trophy and outright championship (Phil Glew also drove for Special Tuning UK using a Seat Leon at Silverstone Round 7). Daniel Lloyd finished 18th and 17th in the Independents Trophy and outright championship. Sam Tordoff finished 23rd in the Independents Trophy and outright championship. Jeff Smith finished equal 24th in the Independents Trophy and outright championship. Triple Eight finished 5th and 7th in the Independents Team Trophy and Teams championship.

With an unexpected and disappointing 2010 season, Triple Eight were hoping for a much improved season. The team again used the Vectra as their weapon for the new season along with the new NGTC turbocharged engine replacing the S2000 naturally aspirated engine. James Nash was hired as the full-time driver. He was joined by three different drivers throughout the season. Tony Gilham (Rounds 1–6), Aron Smith (Round 7) and Ollie Jackson (9–10). Another change to the team was the sponsorship. Collins Contractors became the main sponsor for the team. The season ran well with James Nash securing podiums and at times the championship lead. His breakthrough win came at Rockingham Round 8. James Nash went on to win the Independents Trophy and Independents Team Trophy for Triple Eight and outright third in the teams championship. James Nash finished equal 4th in the overall championship with Mat Jackson. Tony Gilham finished 15th and 19th in the Independents Trophy and outright championship (Tony Gilham also drove for Geoff Steel Racing). Aron Smith finished equal 21st and equal 22nd in the Independents Trophy and outright championship. Ollie Jackson finished equal 19th and equal 26th in the championship.

=== MG manufacturer entry (2012–2017) ===
==== MG6 GT (2012–2017) ====
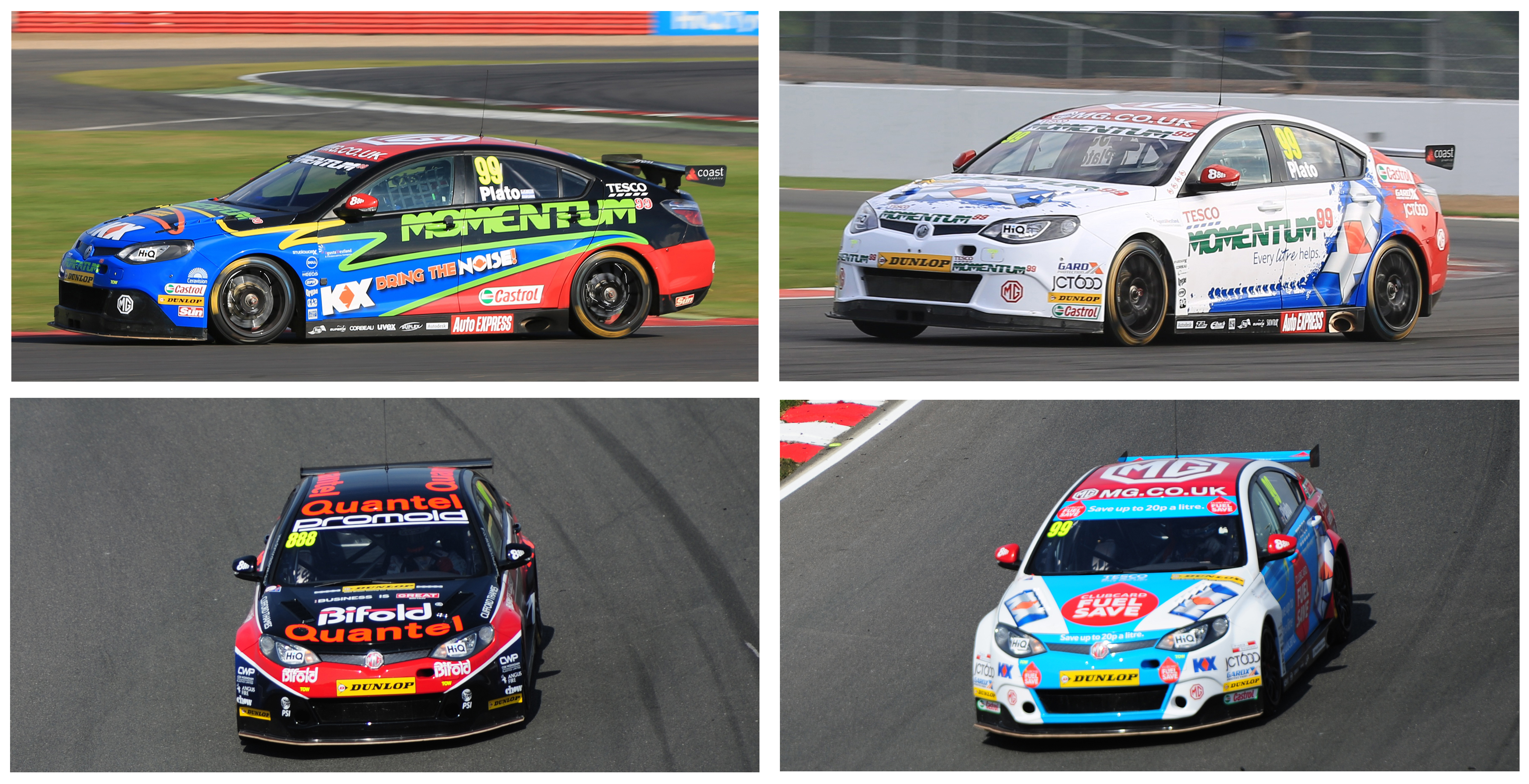
Triple Eight-run MG cars that competed between 2012 and 2014

It was officially announced that Triple Eight would return to Manufacturer status with MG, running a pair of MG6 GT cars to the latest Next Generation Touring Car specification. Jason Plato joined the team from Chevrolet, alongside Andy Neate, who had joined from Team Aon. This meant that although Triple Eight were the reigning Independent Driver and Team champions, they would be ineligible to defend their titles due to the MG's manufacturer support.

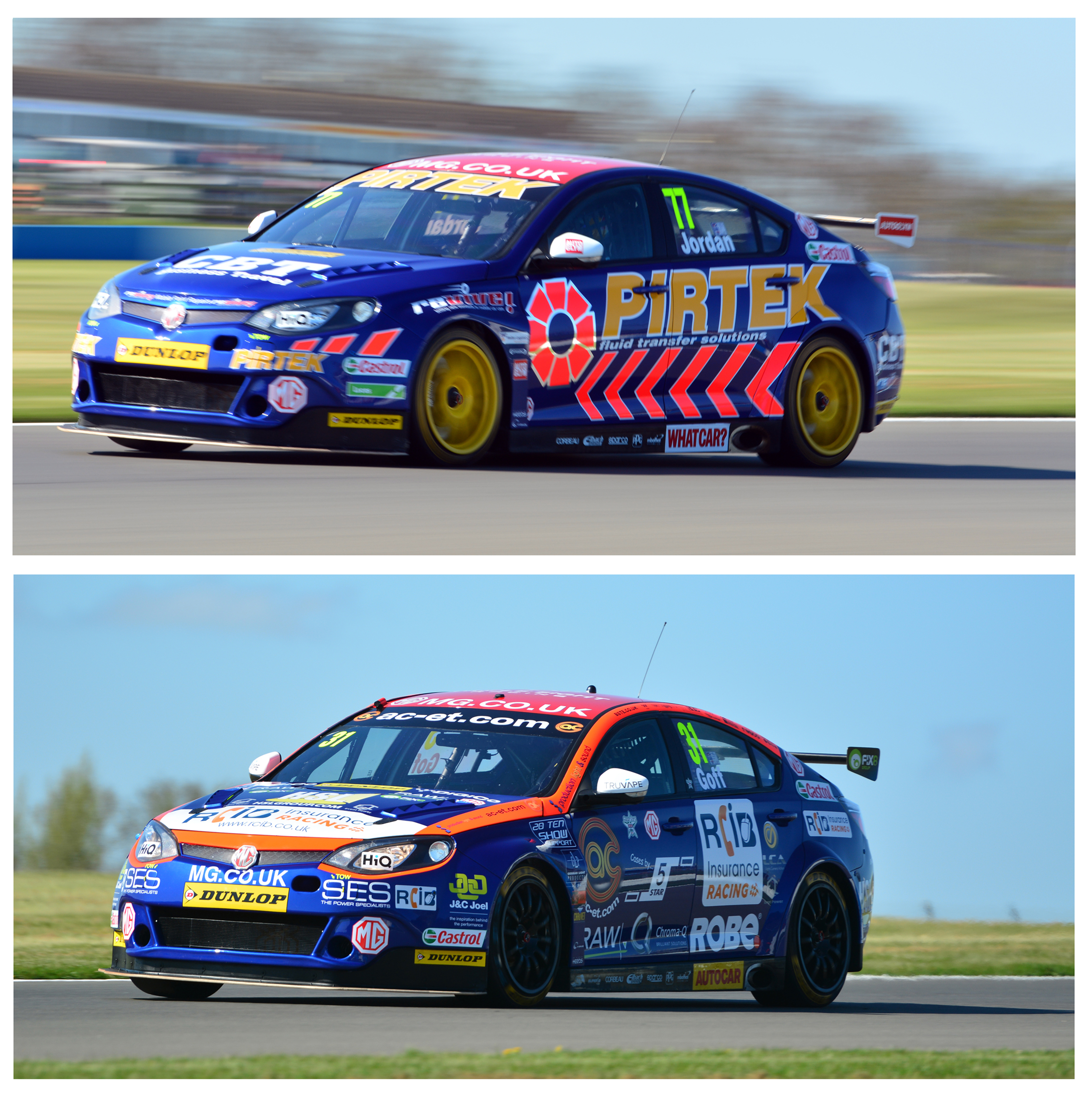
The team's 2015 BTCC cars, campaigned by Andrew Jordan and Jack Goff

Entering the championship as MG KX Momentum Racing, with the main sponsor being Tesco through its KX energy drink and Momentum Fuel brands, the car made its debut at Brands Hatch after hardly turning a wheel during its build and development. Nevertheless, the car was on the pace straight away, scoring a third place in race two and the car's maiden win at the hands of Plato in race three. Throughout the rest of the first half of the 2012 season, the MG6 and Plato scored a further six podium positions including a second win at Croft just before the mid-season break. This left Plato third in the drivers' championship and the team fourth in the teams' championship. Plato's teammate Andy Neate, however, did not fare as well with his debut with the team, with his best result being sixth but often struggling to get his MG into the top ten; which left him only 17th at the halfway point of the season. The second half of the year saw Plato add four more wins to his tally, at Snetterton, Rockingham and Silverstone placing him 3rd in the final standings, while Neate ended up 16th. The team meanwhile slipped to 5th place in the overall championship and came 2nd in the Manufacturers' standings.

Plato stayed with the team for 2013, while Neate was replaced by Porsche Carrera Cup race winner Sam Tordoff. Their second year with the MG6 GT proved more successful, with both drivers securing more top-spot finishes. However, despite the improvements, Plato still only finished 3rd in the drivers championship, with the team finishing as runners up to Honda Yuasa Racing in both Teams and Manufacturer's championships.

Ashley Sutton's Triple Eight-run car for the 2016 British Touring Car Championship

In 2014, the team entered as MG KX Clubcard Fuel Save and retained their 2013 driver lineup. However, the team expanded to run a third, independent entry MG6 GT under the name Quantel BiFold Racing for 1999 British Formula Three Championship winner and Head of Driver Development at Marussia F1 Marc Hynes. The campaign got off to a good start with Plato and Tordoff both scoring race wins at the second round at Donington Park. Plato continued his good form scoring a further five wins during the season finishing the season as runner up. The pairing of Plato and Tordoff was good enough thought to secure MG's first Manufacturers Championship, beating rivals Honda by ninety-five points. This was the first title that the team has won since the departure of Vauxhall and the swap to MG.

A new driver lineup and sponsor package was announced for the 2015 British Touring Car Championship. 2013 Drivers' Champion Andrew Jordan moved to the team from his family run Eurotech Racing.

The 2016 British Touring Car Championship was to be the first of a new 3-year deal between Triple Eight and MG to race in the BTCC. Warren Scott purchased the team during the off-season, alongside his Team BMR operation. A new line-up was formed of 2015 Jack Sears Trophy winner Josh Cook, who moved from Power Maxed Racing, and 2015 Renault UK Clio Cup champion Ashley Sutton graduated into the championship. Cook and Sutton would place 12th and 13th in the championship with Sutton delivering a win in the third race at Croft. This win was Sutton's first but would turn out to be the final race win for Triple Eight Racing in the British Touring Car Championship.

Triple Eight left the BTCC after the 2017 season, two years into its three-year MG extension, and folded on 13 November 2018. Scott's other outfit, Team BMR, managed just one more year itself before also ceasing to exist as a team due to Scott's financial difficulties.

=== Legacy ===
Today, Triple 8 Racing remains one of the most successful teams to compete in the British Touring Car Championship with 6 drivers champions and 8 manufacturers titles for both Vauxhall and MG. Despite not existing as an entity anymore, it still operates in the Supercars Championship running the Red Bull Ampol Racing team where the team has become the most successful team in the history of Supercars/ATCC.

=== BTCC gallery ===
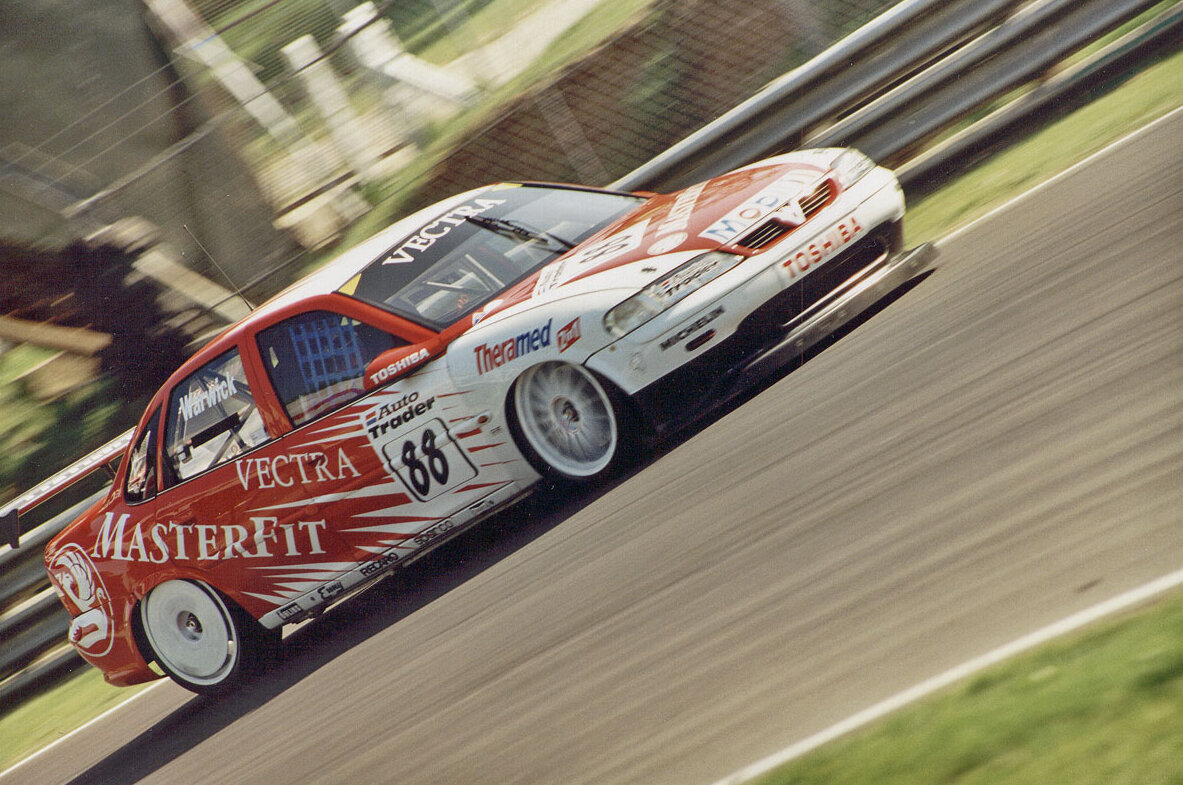

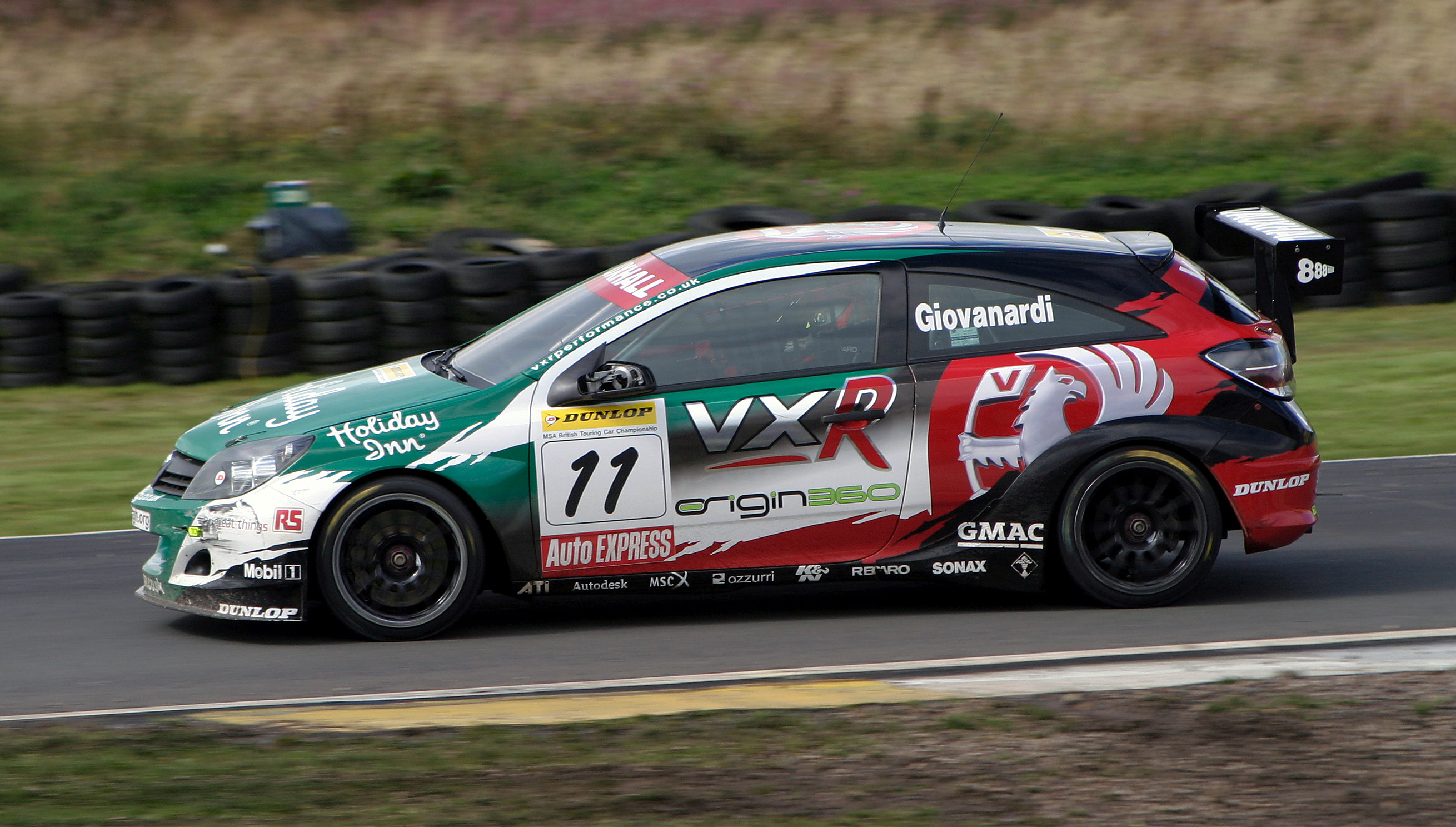

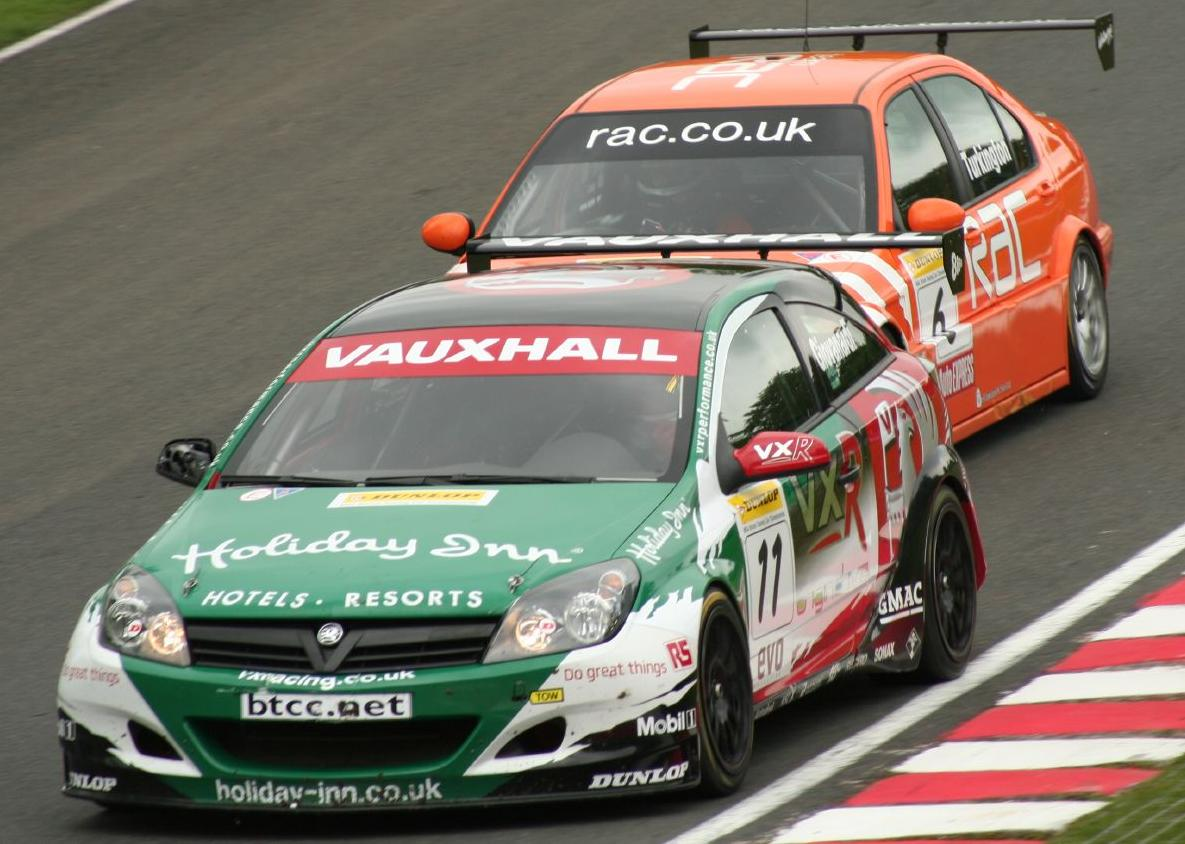

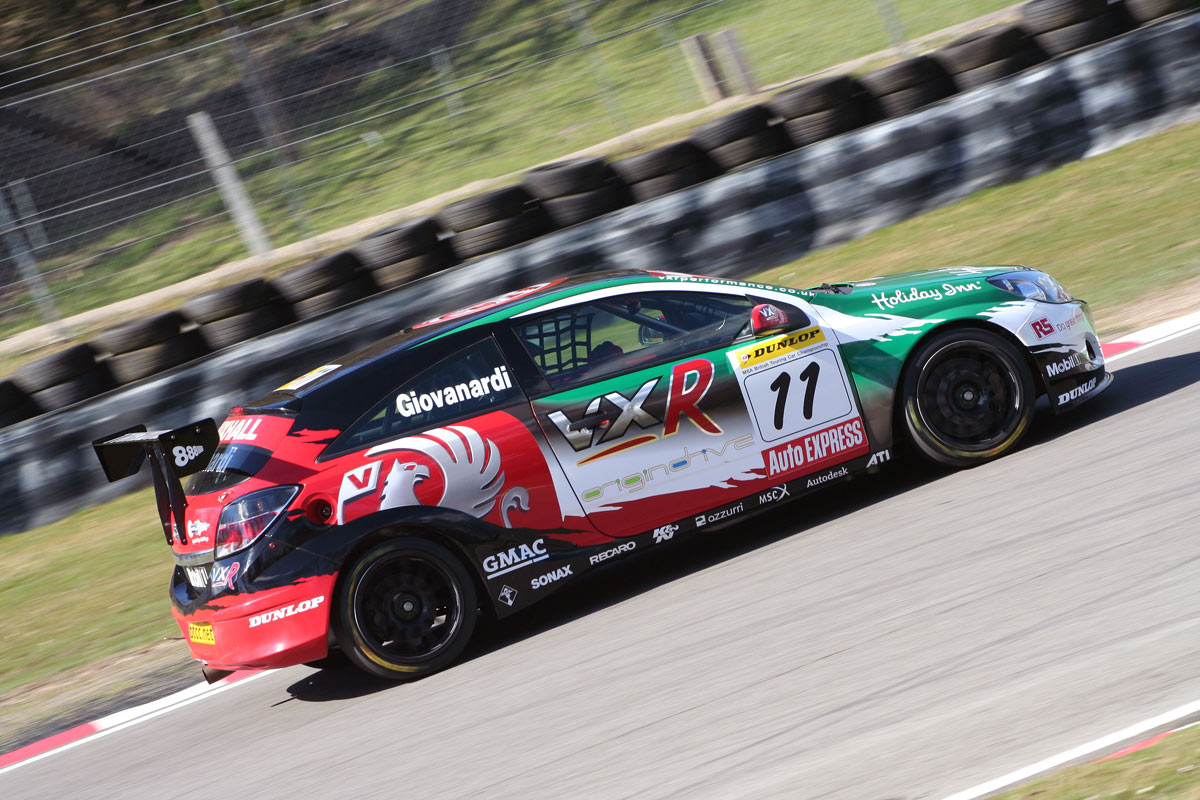

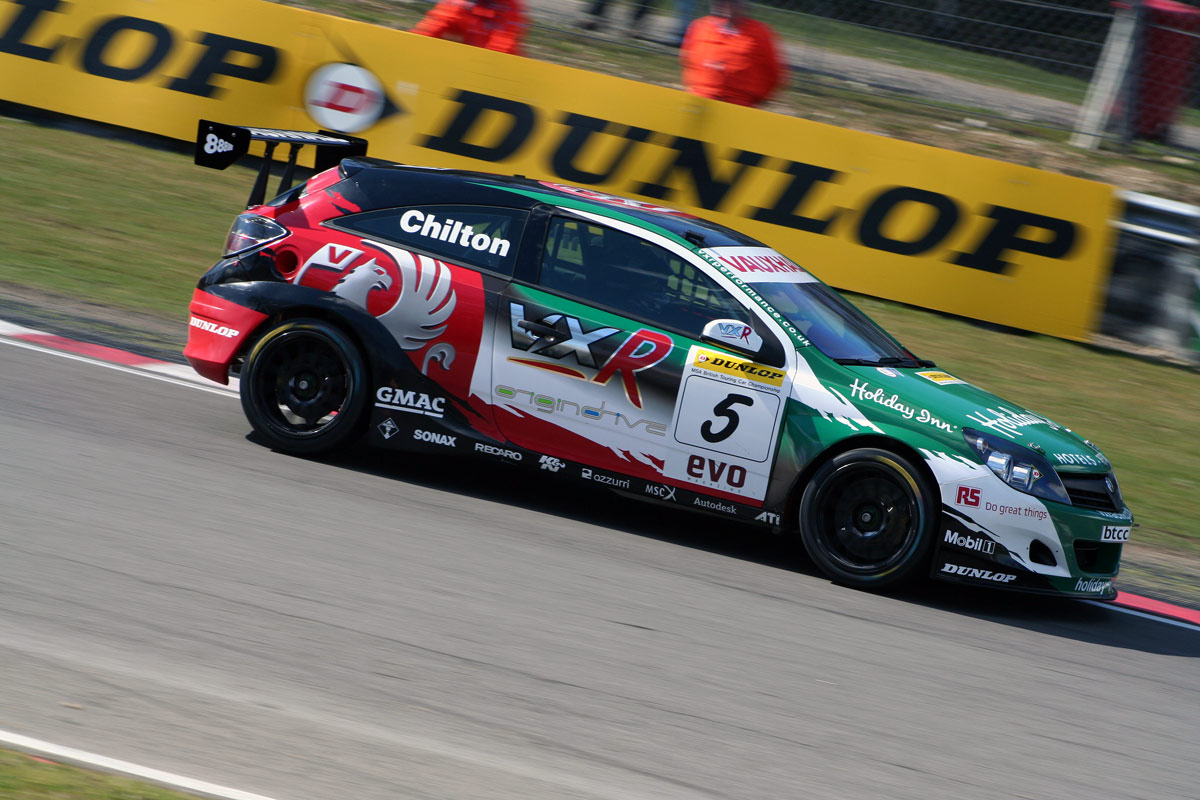

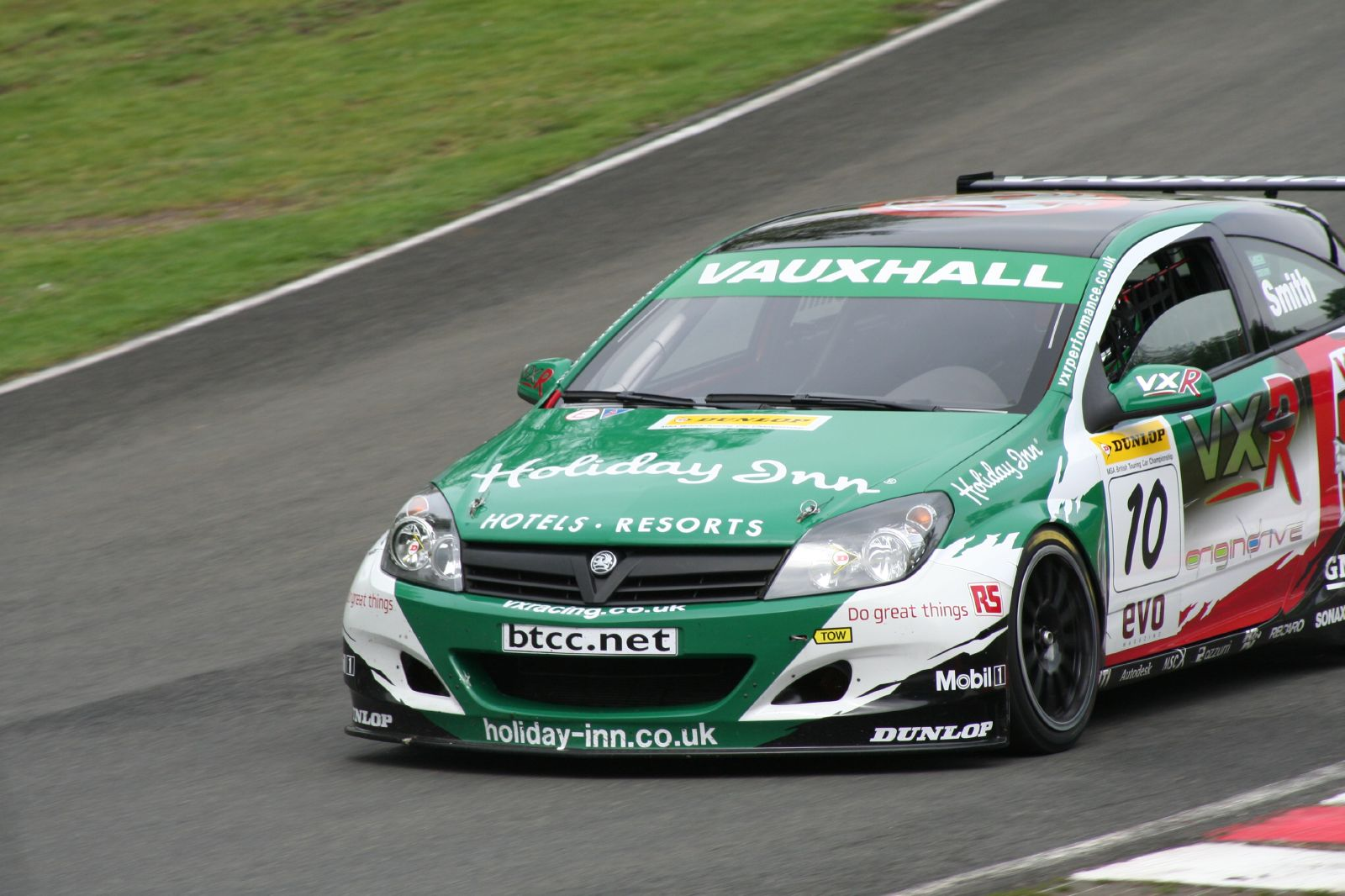

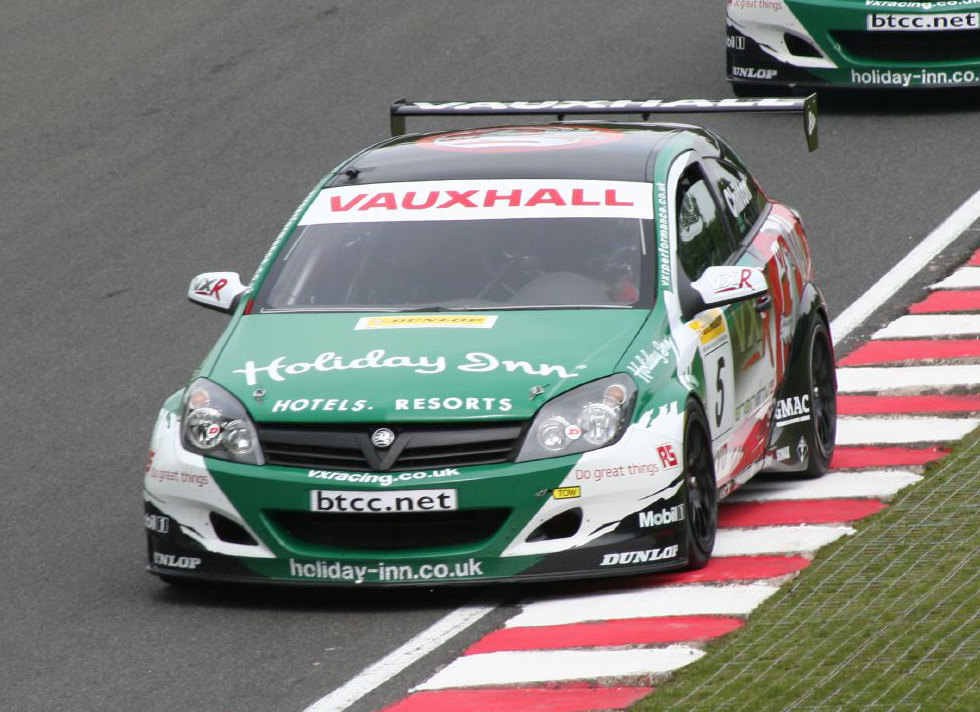

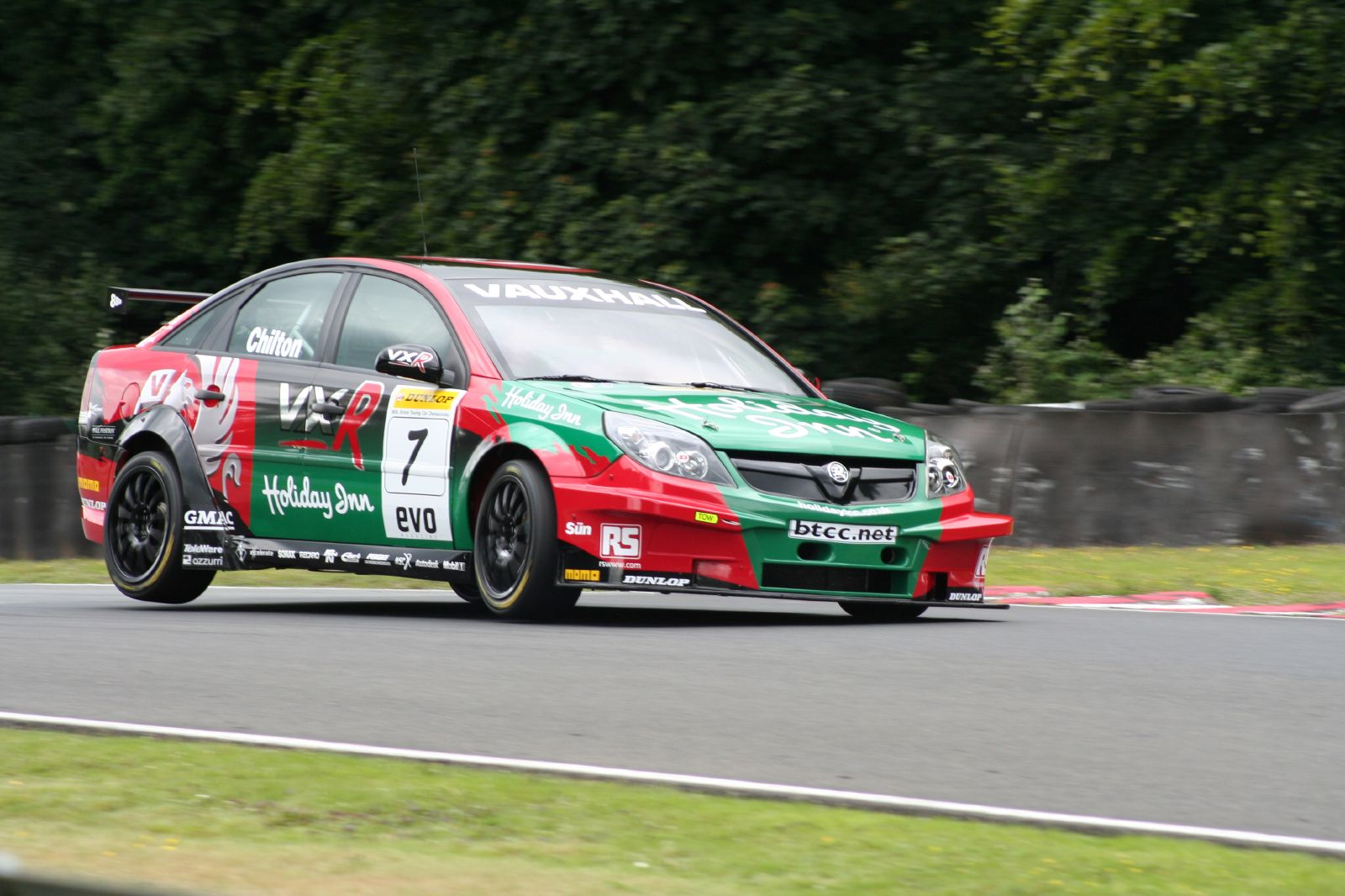

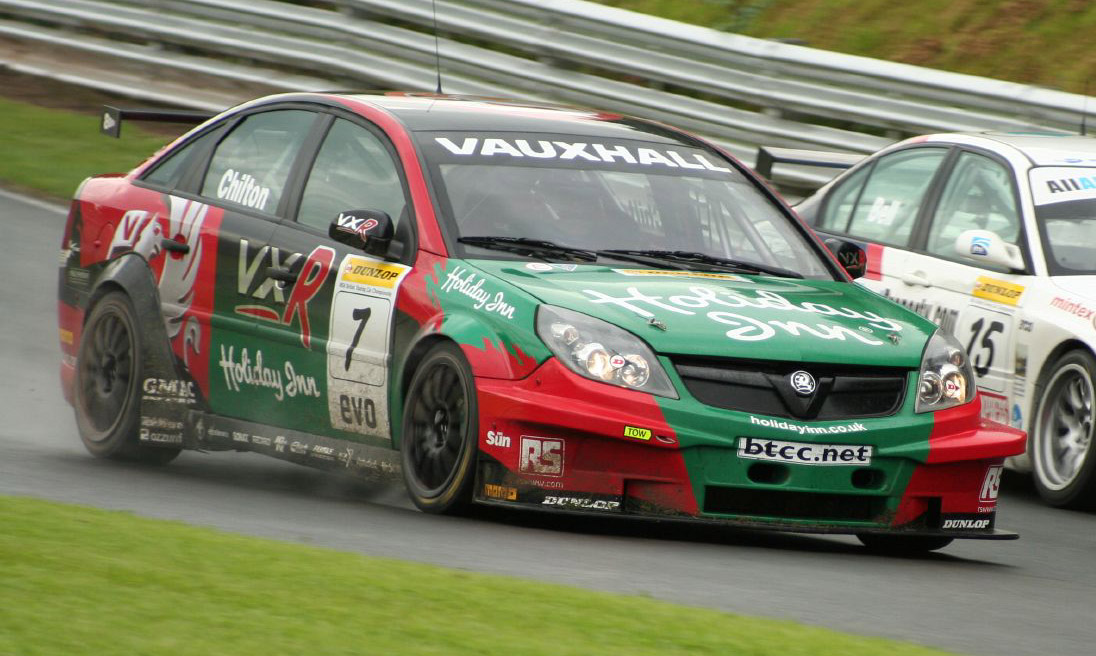

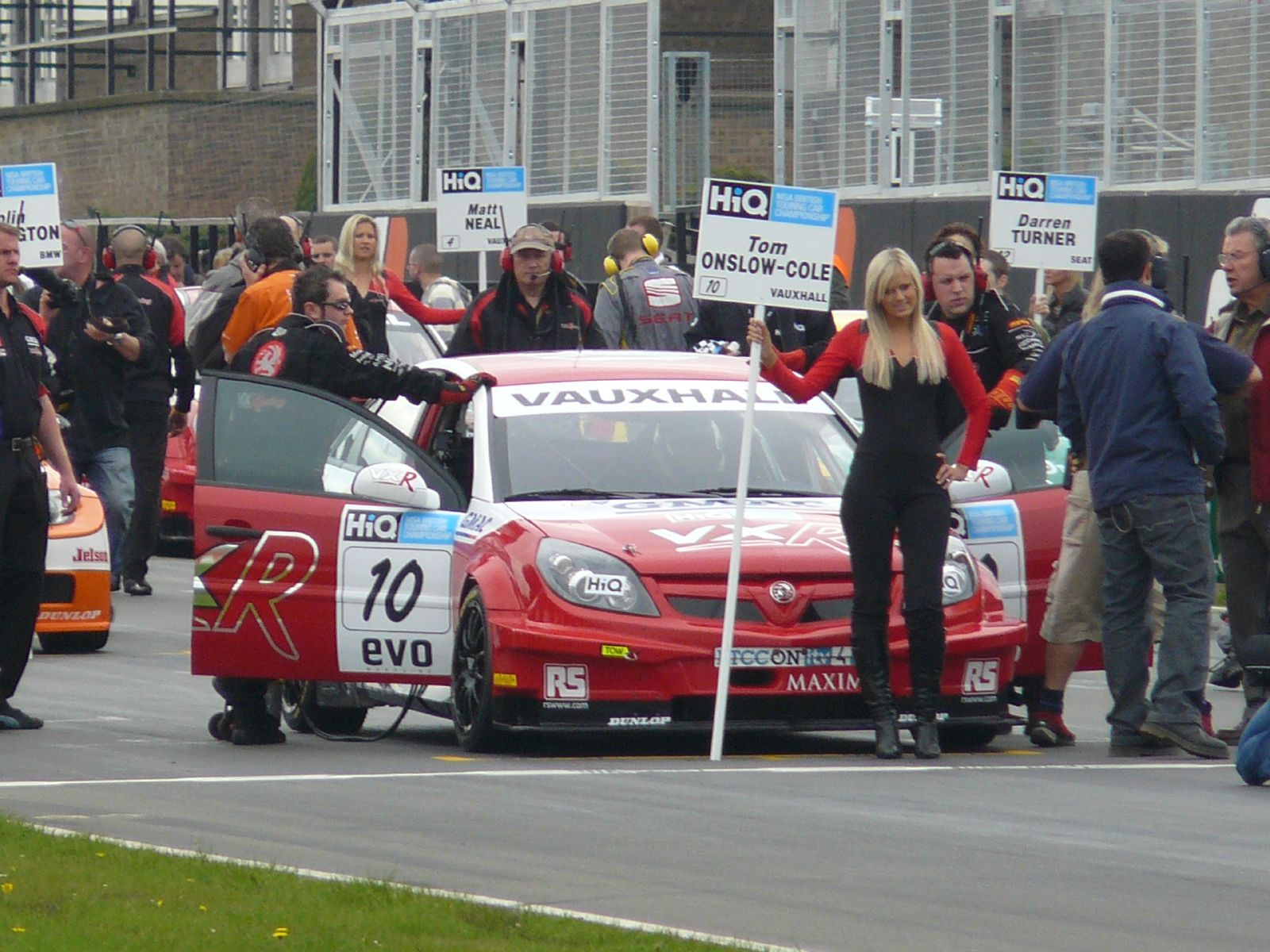

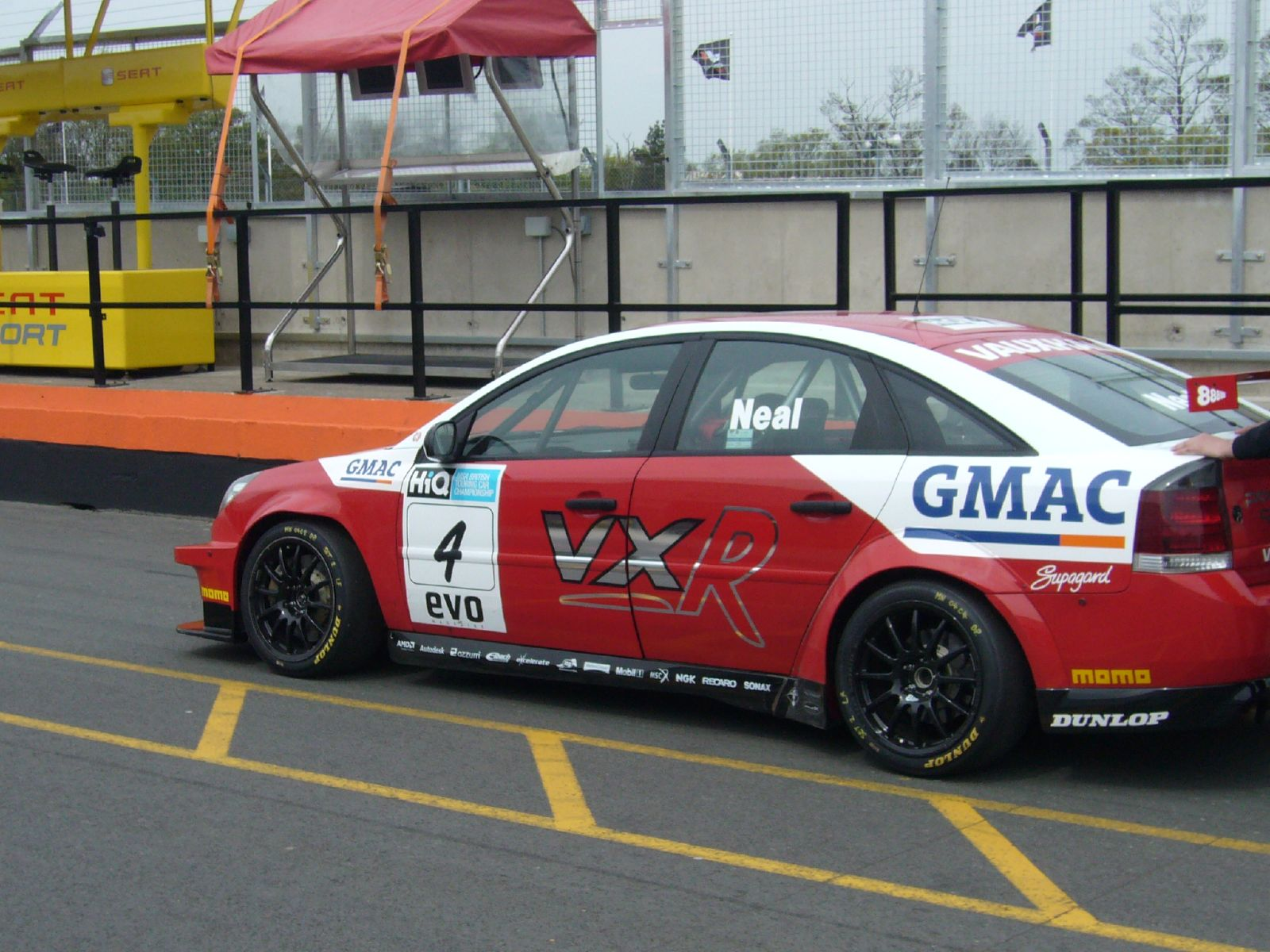

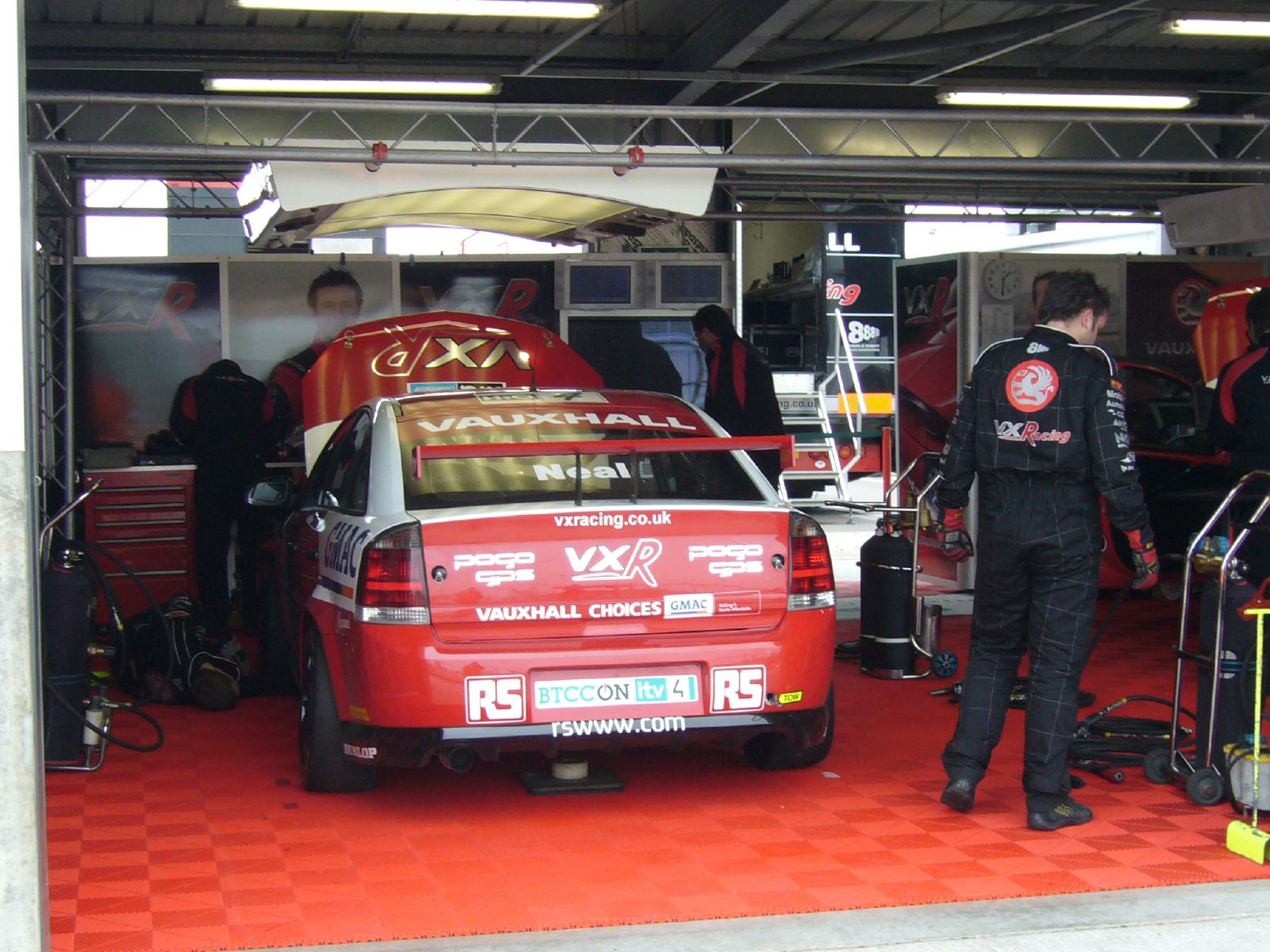

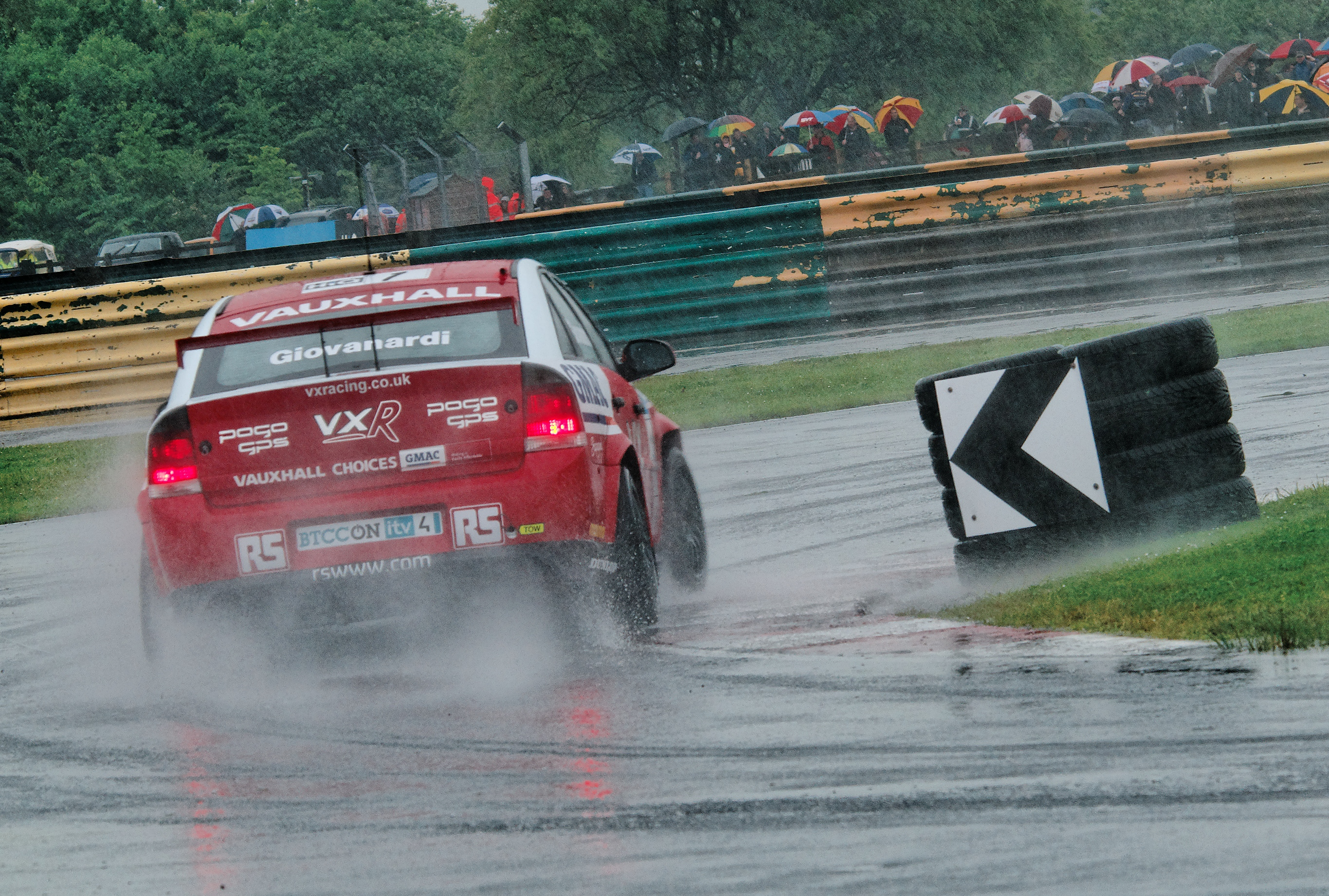

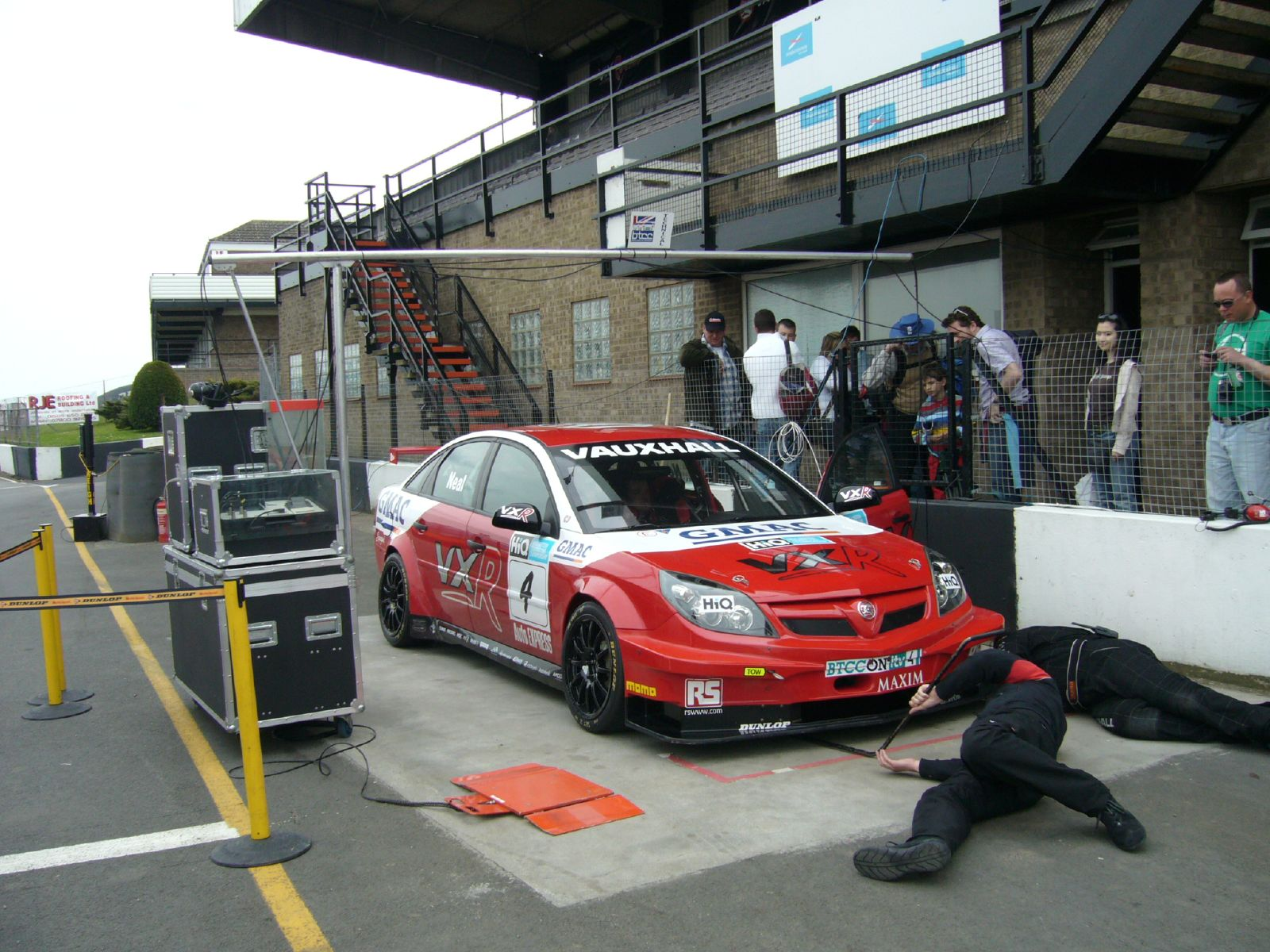

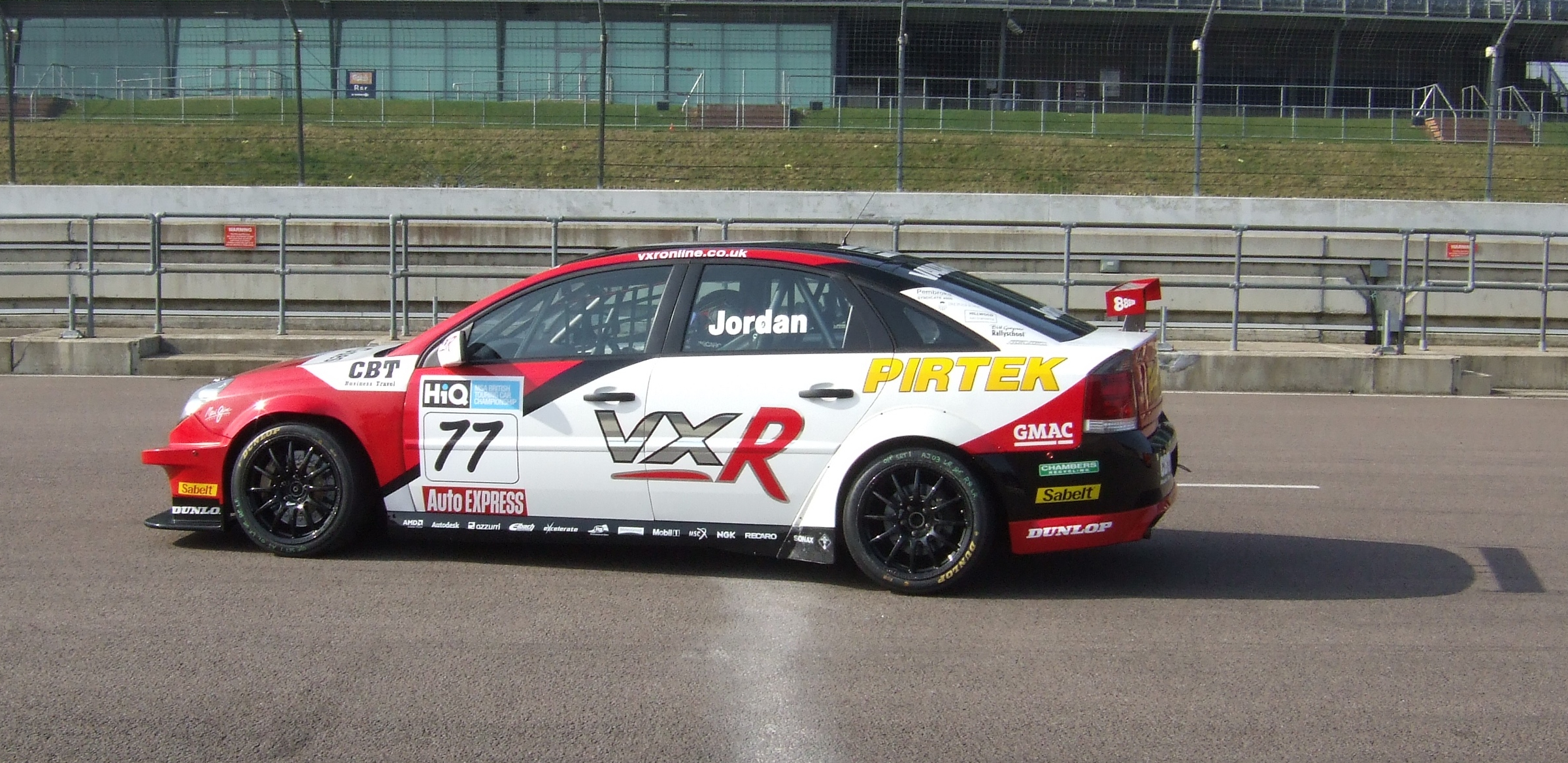

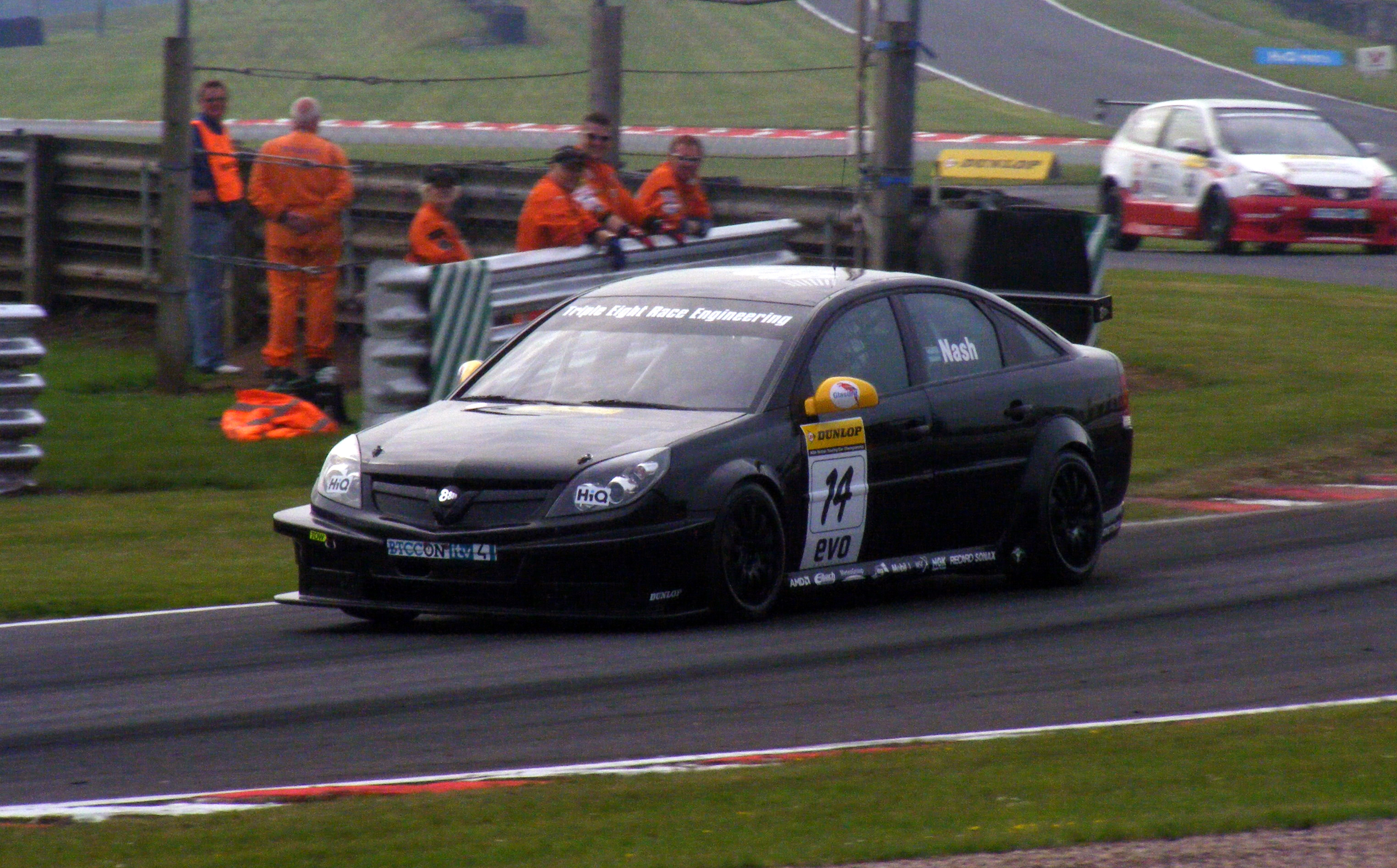

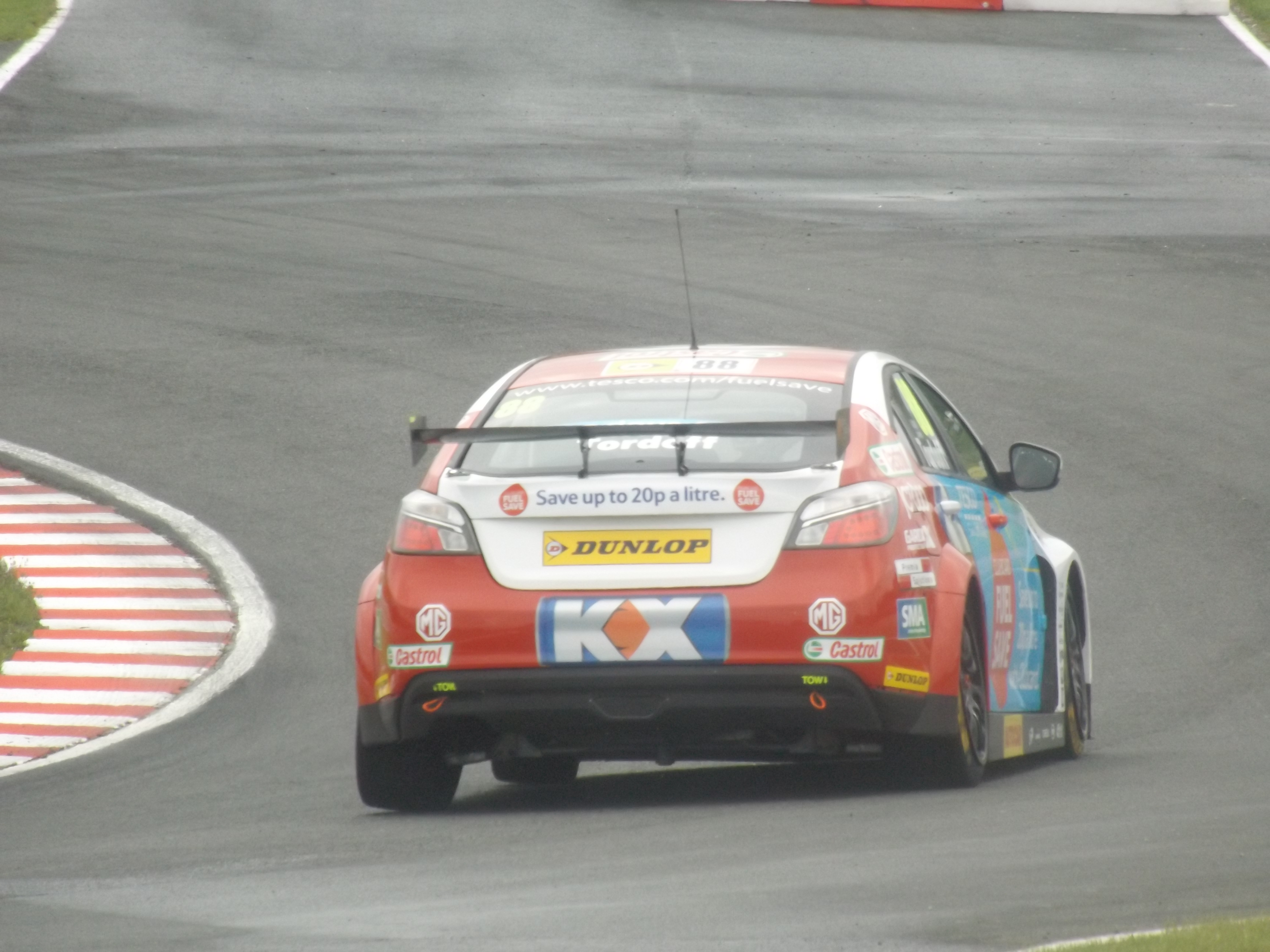

=== BTCC results ===
British Touring Car Championship results
Year	Team name	Car	Drivers	Wins	Poles	Fast laps	Points	D.C.	T.C.	M.C.	I.D.C.	I.T.C.
1997	Vauxhall Sport	Vauxhall Vectra B	(United Kingdom) John Cleland	0	0	0	44	12th	8th	8th	N/A	
1997	Vauxhall Sport	Vauxhall Vectra B	(United Kingdom) Derek Warwick	0	0	0	33	14th	8th	8th	N/A	
1998	Vauxhall Sport	Vauxhall Vectra B	(United Kingdom) Derek Warwick	1	0	0	70	9th	5th	5th	N/A	
1998	Vauxhall Sport	Vauxhall Vectra B	(United Kingdom) John Cleland	2	0	0	106	8th	5th	5th	N/A	
1998	Vauxhall Sport	Vauxhall Vectra B	(Brazil) Flávio Figueiredo	0	0	0	0	22nd	5th	5th	N/A	
1999	Vauxhall Motorsport	Vauxhall Vectra B	(France) Yvan Muller	1	0	1	119	6th	5th	5th	N/A	
1999	Vauxhall Motorsport	Vauxhall Vectra B	(United Kingdom) John Cleland	0	0	0	51	13th	5th	5th	N/A	
2000	Vauxhall Motorsport	Vauxhall Vectra B	(United Kingdom) Jason Plato	2	2	5	160	5th	2nd	3rd	N/A	
2000	Vauxhall Motorsport	Vauxhall Vectra B	(France) Yvan Muller	3	1	1	168	4th	2nd	3rd	N/A	
2000	Vauxhall Motorsport	Vauxhall Vectra B	(Belgium) Vincent Radermecker	0	0	0	81	10th	2nd	3rd	N/A	
2001	Vauxhall Motorsport	Vauxhall Astra Coupé	(United Kingdom) Jason Plato	5	7	10	336	1st	1st	1st	N/A	
2001	Vauxhall Motorsport	Vauxhall Astra Coupé	(France) Yvan Muller	8	9	12	318	2nd	1st	1st	N/A	
2001	egg:sport	Vauxhall Astra Coupé	(United Kingdom) James Thompson	4	3	4	276	3rd	2nd	1st	N/A	
2001	egg:sport	Vauxhall Astra Coupé	(United Kingdom) Phil Bennett	2	3	1	173	4th	2nd	1st	N/A	
2001	egg:sport	Vauxhall Astra Coupé	(United Kingdom) Andy Priaulx	0	2	0	15	11th	2nd	1st	N/A	
2002	Vauxhall Motorsport	Vauxhall Astra Coupé	(United Kingdom) James Thompson	6	5	5	183	1st	1st	1st	N/A	
2002	Vauxhall Motorsport	Vauxhall Astra Coupé	(France) Yvan Muller	5	5	7	163	2nd	1st	1st	N/A	
2002	egg:sport	Vauxhall Astra Coupé	(United Kingdom) Matt Neal	3	3	5	145	3rd	3rd	1st	N/A	
2002	egg:sport	Vauxhall Astra Coupé	(United Kingdom) Paul O'Neill	1	0	0	77	8th	3rd	1st	N/A	
2003	VX Racing	Vauxhall Astra Coupé	(France) Yvan Muller	6	3	1	233	1st	1st	1st	N/A	
2003	VX Racing	Vauxhall Astra Coupé	(United Kingdom) James Thompson	4	9	3	199	2nd	1st	1st	N/A	
2003	VX Racing	Vauxhall Astra Coupé	(United Kingdom) Paul O'Neill	1	1	0	138	4th	1st	1st	N/A	
2004	VX Racing	Vauxhall Astra Coupé	(United Kingdom) James Thompson	4	4	7	274	1st	1st	1st	N/A	
2004	VX Racing	Vauxhall Astra Coupé	(France) Yvan Muller	5	1	2	273	2nd	1st	1st	N/A	
2004	VX Racing	Vauxhall Astra Coupé	(United Kingdom) Luke Hines	2	3	0	115	10th	1st	1st	N/A	
2005	VX Racing	Vauxhall Astra Sport Hatch	(United Kingdom) Colin Turkington	2	3	1	174	6th	2nd	1st	N/A	
2005	VX Racing	Vauxhall Astra Sport Hatch	(France) Yvan Muller	6	1	6	273	2nd	2nd	1st	N/A	
2005	VX Racing	Vauxhall Astra Sport Hatch	(Republic of Ireland) Gavin Smith	0	0	1	86	10th	2nd	1st	N/A	
2006	VX Racing	Vauxhall Astra Sport Hatch	(United Kingdom) Tom Chilton	0	1	2	139	7th	3rd	2nd	N/A	
2006	VX Racing	Vauxhall Astra Sport Hatch	(Italy) Fabrizio Giovanardi	2	0	0	163	6th	3rd	2nd	N/A	
2006	VX Racing	Vauxhall Astra Sport Hatch	(Republic of Ireland) Gavin Smith	0	0	1	123	8th	3rd	2nd	N/A	
2006	VX Racing	Vauxhall Astra Sport Hatch	(Turkey) Erkut Kızılırmak	0	0	0	0	24th	3rd	2nd	N/A	
2007	VX Racing	Vauxhall Vectra C	(United Kingdom) Tom Chilton	0	1	2	130	9th	2nd	1st	N/A	
2007	VX Racing	Vauxhall Vectra C	(Italy) Fabrizio Giovanardi	10	1	4	300	1st	2nd	1st	N/A	
2007	VX Racing	Vauxhall Vectra C	(Switzerland) Alain Menu	0	0	0	13	15th	2nd	1st	N/A	
2008	VX Racing	Vauxhall Vectra C	(United Kingdom) Matt Neal	1	1	1	185	5th	1st	1st	N/A	
2008	VX Racing	Vauxhall Vectra C	(Italy) Fabrizio Giovanardi	5	1	8	262	1st	1st	1st	N/A	
2008	VX Racing	Vauxhall Vectra C	(United Kingdom) Tom Onslow-Cole	2	3	3	170	6th	1st	1st	N/A	
2009	VX Racing	Vauxhall Vectra C	(United Kingdom) Matt Neal	1	3	2	170	4th	1st	1st	N/A	
2009	VX Racing	Vauxhall Vectra C	(Italy) Fabrizio Giovanardi	4	2	4	266	3rd	1st	1st	N/A	
2009	VX Racing	Vauxhall Vectra C	(United Kingdom) Andrew Jordan	0	1	0	114	10th	1st	1st	N/A	
2010	888 with Uniq Racing	Vauxhall Vectra C	(United Kingdom) James Nash	0	1	0	52	12th	7th	N/A	8th	5th
2010	888 with Uniq Racing	Vauxhall Vectra C	(Italy) Fabrizio Giovanardi	2	1	0	38	14th	7th	N/A	12th	5th
2010	888 with Uniq Racing	Vauxhall Vectra C	(United Kingdom) Phil Glew†	0	0	0	9	16th	7th	N/A	14th	5th
2010	888 with Uniq Racing	Vauxhall Vectra C	(United Kingdom) Daniel Lloyd	0	0	0	7	17th	7th	N/A	18th	5th
2010	888 with Uniq Racing	Vauxhall Vectra C	(United Kingdom) Sam Tordoff	0	0	0	1	23rd	7th	N/A	21st	5th
2010	888 with Uniq Racing	Vauxhall Vectra C	(United Kingdom) Jeff Smith	0	0	0	0	29th	7th	N/A	25th	5th
2011	888 with Collins Contractors	Vauxhall Vectra C	(United Kingdom) James Nash	1	0	1	191	5th	3rd	N/A	1st	1st
2011	888 with Collins Contractors	Vauxhall Vectra C	(United Kingdom) Tony Gilham †	0	0	0	12	19th	3rd	N/A	15th	1st
2011	888 with Collins Contractors	Vauxhall Vectra C	(Republic of Ireland) Árón Smith	0	0	0	1	24th	3rd	N/A	21st	1st
2012	MG KX Momentum Racing	MG6 GT	(United Kingdom) Jason Plato	6	5	7	376	3rd	5th	2nd	N/A	
2012	MG KX Momentum Racing	MG6 GT	(United Kingdom) Andy Neate	0	0	0	79	16th	5th	2nd	N/A	
2013	MG KX Momentum Racing	MG6 GT	(United Kingdom) Jason Plato	8	4	6	380	3rd	2nd	2nd	N/A	
2013	MG KX Momentum Racing	MG6 GT	(United Kingdom) Sam Tordoff	1	1	3	286	6th	2nd	2nd	N/A	
2014	MG KX Clubcard Fuel Save	MG6 GT	(United Kingdom) Jason Plato	6	4	2	399	2nd	3rd	1st	N/A	
2014	MG KX Clubcard Fuel Save	MG6 GT	(United Kingdom) Sam Tordoff	1	2	1	255	7th	3rd	1st	N/A	
2014	Quantel BiFold Racing	MG6 GT	(United Kingdom) Marc Hynes	0	0	0	54	18th	12th	N/A	14th	10th
2015	MG Triple Eight Racing	MG6 GT	(United Kingdom) Jack Goff	1	0	0	233	9th	3rd	2nd	N/A	
2015	MG Triple Eight Racing	MG6 GT	(United Kingdom) Andrew Jordan	0	0	0	274	5th	3rd	2nd	N/A	
2016	MG Racing RCIB Insurance	MG6 GT	(United Kingdom) Josh Cook	0	0	0	175	12th	5th	4th	N/A	
2016	MG Racing RCIB Insurance	MG6 GT	(United Kingdom) Ashley Sutton	1	1	1	162	13th	5th	4th	N/A	
2017	MG Racing RCIB Insurance	MG6 GT	(Republic of Ireland) Árón Taylor-Smith	0	0	0	18	19th	16th	5th	N/A	
2017	MG Racing RCIB Insurance	MG6 GT	(United Kingdom) Daniel Lloyd †	0	0	1	6	24th	16th	5th	N/A	
2017	MG Racing RCIB Insurance	MG6 GT	(United Kingdom) Josh Cook †	0	0	0	58	12th	16th	5th	N/A	
Year	Team name	Car	Drivers	Wins	Poles	Fast laps	Points	D.C.	T.C.	M.C.	I.D.C.	I.T.C.

Notes
* Season still in progress
† Swapped teams mid season

== GT racing ==
Triple Eight made their debut into Sports car racing during the 2013 British GT season. They prepared and ran a pair of BMW Z4 GT3 cars in a joint venture with Optimum Motorsport and entered the championship as 888Optimum. The team did well in their first year, securing several podium positions as well as two pole positions at Brands Hatch and Donington Park, with their experienced driver parings of Joe Osborne & Lee Mowle and Daniel Brown & Steve Tandy.

Triple Eight continued racing during the 2014 British GT season, using the BMWs. However, whilst they retained Joe Osborne & Lee Mowle, they added the new pairing of Derek Johnston and Luke Hines. Towards the end of the season, Warren Hughes and Jody Firth joined the team in a third Z4. The team finished the year 7th in the team's championship, 2 places behind the debut years finishing position, with Derek Johnston being the highest placed driver finishing 14th.

Triple Eight also entered select rounds of the 2014 Blancpain Endurance Series season and the British-based GT Cup Championship. In the Blancpain Endurance Series, Ryan Ratcliffe joined Lee Mowle and Derek Johnston for the 3 Hours of Silverstone, retiring after 16 minutes, where as Jody Firth and Warren Hughes were joined by Alexander Sims for the 1000 km Nürburgring finishing a respectable ninth, only two laps behind the race winner.

=== British GT results ===
British GT results
Year	Car	Class	Drivers	Wins	Poles	Points	D.C.	T.C.
2013	BMW Z4 GT3 with Optimum Motorsport	GT3	(United Kingdom) Daniel Brown (United Kingdom) Steve Tandy	0	1	86.5	7th	5th
2013	BMW Z4 GT3 with Optimum Motorsport	GT3	(United Kingdom) Joe Osborne (United Kingdom) Lee Mowle	0	1	23.5	18th	5th
2014	BMW Z4 GT3 as Triple Eight Race Engineering	GT3	(United Kingdom) Derek Johnston	0	0	41.5	14th	7th
2014	BMW Z4 GT3 as Triple Eight Race Engineering	GT3	(United Kingdom) Luke Hines	0	0	38.5	16th	7th
2014	BMW Z4 GT3 as Triple Eight Race Engineering	GT3	(United Kingdom) Joe Osborne	0	0	29	21st	7th
2014	BMW Z4 GT3 as Triple Eight Race Engineering	GT3	(United Kingdom) Lee Mowle	0	0	27.5	22nd	7th
2014	BMW Z4 GT3 as Triple Eight Race Engineering	GT3	(United Kingdom) Jody Firth (United Kingdom) Warren Hughes	0	0	12	32nd	7th
2014	BMW Z4 GT3 as Triple Eight Race Engineering	GT3	(United Kingdom) Ryan Ratcliffe	0	0	1.5	40th	7th
2015	BMW Z4 GT3 as Triple Eight Racing	GT3	(United Kingdom) Joe Osborne (United Kingdom) Lee Mowle	0	0	129	3rd	5th

== Formula Renault BARC ==
In 2010 Triple 8 teamed up with Uniq to enter a single car into the Formula Renault BARC championship, under the Uniq Racing with 888 name. They entered this series to gain experience for expansion into other series in 2011, particularly series which support the BTCC. Malaysian driver Sazlan Sirajudin drove the car at all six meetings, with 10th being his best finish at Silverstone. He finished the season 16th overall.

=== Series results ===
Formula Renault BARC results
Year	Drivers	Wins	Poles	Fast laps	Points	D.C.
2010	(Malaysia) Sazlan Sirajudin	0	0	0	61	16th

== Porsche Carrera Cup GB and Ginetta GT Supercup ==
Triple Eight announced that they were going to run at least two cars in the 2011 Porsche Carrera Cup Great Britain and that they were going to enter the 2011 Ginetta GT Supercup season. However, they failed to enter any races in both championships.

== Other projects ==
Triple Eight are also involved in several other forms of motorsport, ranging from the British Rally Championship to the Dunlop Sport Maxx Cup.

=== BTC-T Vauxhall Vectra ===
The team built a Vectra to the BTC-T Specifications for the 2004 British Touring Car Championship season. However the car was never used due to problems making the car competitive.

=== Supercars ===
In September 2003, Triple Eight entered the Australian V8 Supercars series purchasing Briggs Motor Sport and renaming it Triple Eight Race Engineering. The team is now under separate ownership and is no longer directly linked to its British progenitor, although Ian Harrison remains a minority shareholder.

=== Pro1000 Series ===
Triple 8 were given the opportunity to develop 16 race-spec Caparo T1000's for the 2010 season. The T1000 was a modified version of the Caparo T1. However, the series never materialised.

=== Customer Car Division ===
The customer division of Triple Eight is also growing. Triple Eight Performance Vehicles launched a limited edition Astra Sport Hatch turbo diesel, which followed on from the 2001 manufacture of 100 Special Edition road cars, in the form of the Astra Coupé 888 which was engineered to translate race-winning experience into phenomenal road car response. The T8 proved to be one of Vauxhall's fastest ever selling road vehicles.
