= 2007 British Touring Car Championship =

50th season of the British Touring Car Championship

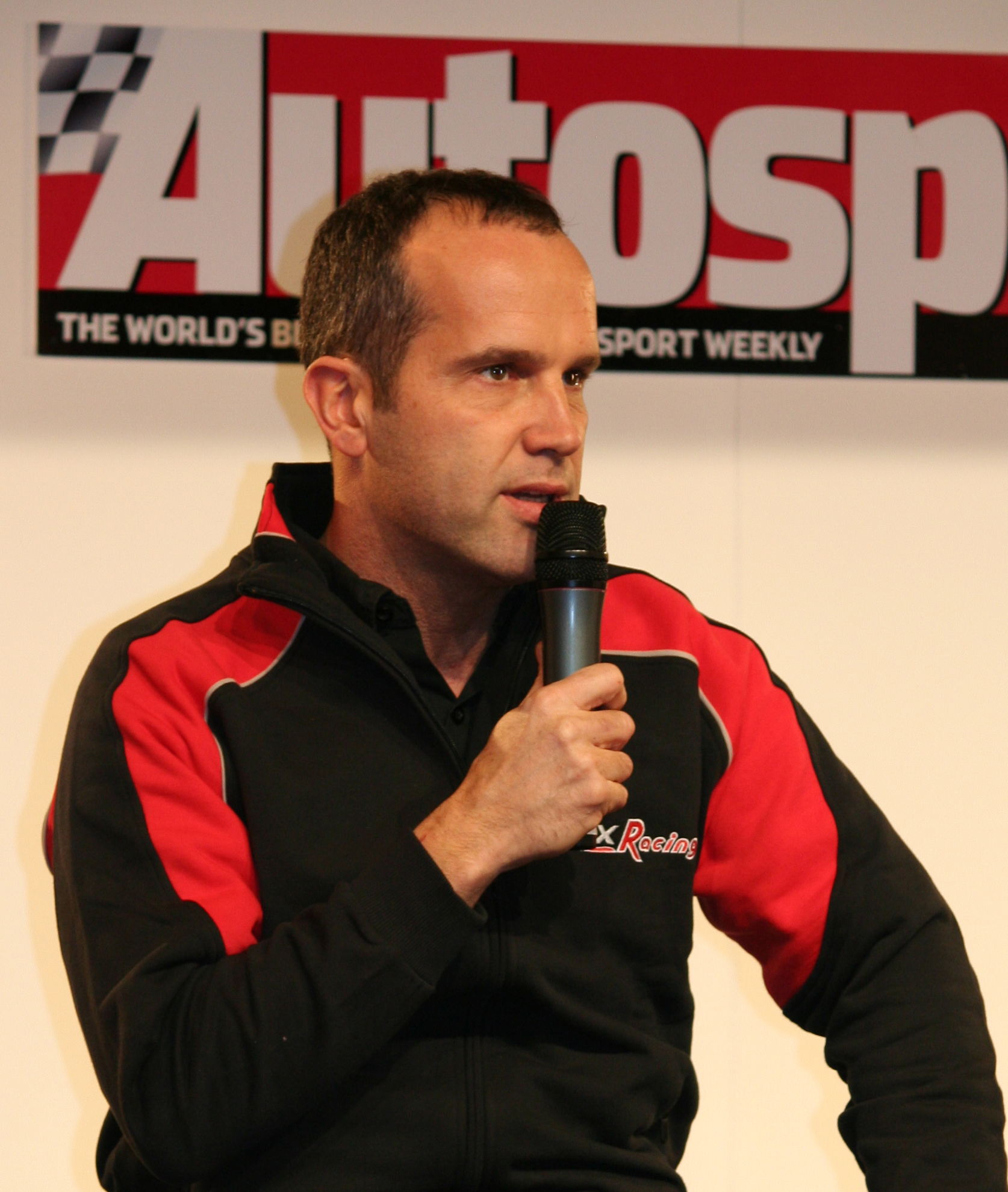
Fabrizio Giovanardi, the 2007 British Touring Car Champion.

The 2007 Dunlop MSA British Touring Car Championship season was the 50th British Touring Car Championship (BTCC) season. It was won by Fabrizio Giovanardi with 10 race wins and 17 podiums. Going into the final race, Fabrizio Giovanardi was one point behind Jason Plato but a second place for Giovanardi and a fourth place for Plato resulted in Giovanardi taking the championship by 3 points. The Teams' championship was won by SEAT Sport UK, the Manufacturers' championship was won by Vauxhall, the Independents' Trophy was won by Colin Turkington and the Independent Teams' championship was won by Team RAC.

== Changes for 2007 ==
=== Teams and drivers ===
After two seasons with the Astra Sport Hatch, the Triple 8-run works Vauxhall team switched to an all-new chassis based on the Vectra C built to the now-prevalent Super 2000 rules, retaining Fabrizio Giovanardi and Tom Chilton as drivers.

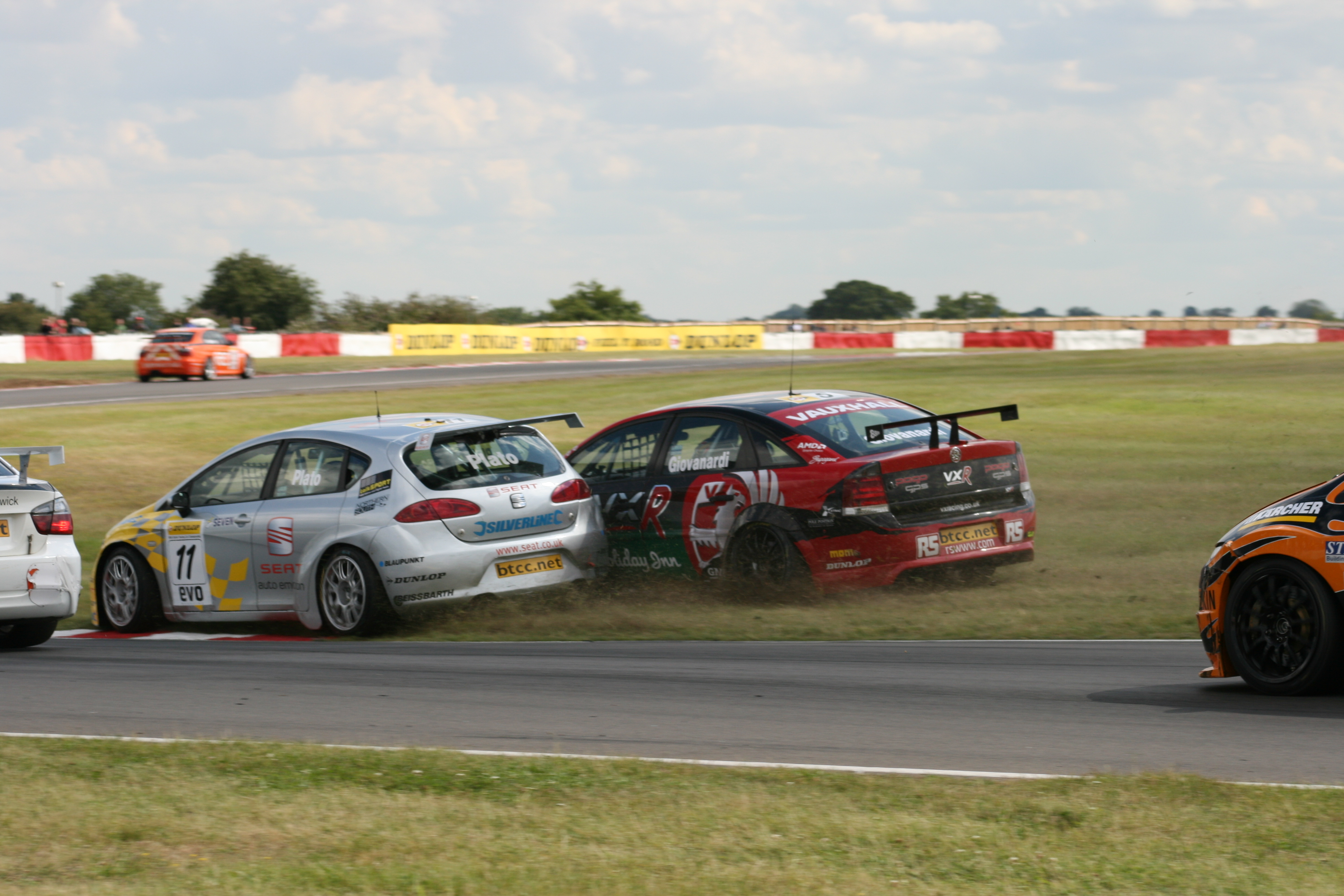
Championship rivals Jason Plato and Fabrizio Giovanardi collide at Snetterton.

Reigning Manufacturers champions SEAT were again their only works opposition. Jason Plato remained on board as team leader and GT racer Darren Turner, who had shared the second Leon with James Thompson during 2006, stepped into the second seat full-time. With their Manufacturers title fight going down to the final rounds at Thruxton, both Vauxhall and SEAT added third cars to their line-ups for the closing meeting. Double champion Alain Menu, who had been racing for Vauxhall's sister marque Chevrolet in the World Touring Car Championship, returned to the British series for the first time since 2000 to drive the Vectra, while Dutchman Tom Coronel, fresh from claiming the WTCC Independents title at the wheel of a Leon, bolstered the SEAT charge.

After winning the Teams, Drivers and Independents titles for two straight years with their Integra, Team Dynamics (again under the Team Halfords banner) switched to another self-developed Honda chassis, this time built to Super 2000 specifications and based on the Civic. Reigning double champion Matt Neal stayed with his family team, with Gordon Shedden partnering him for a second year. The Dynamics cars were no longer eligible for Independents points due to their dominance of that championship in the previous two years.

Also changing machinery were West Surrey Racing (once again entered as Team RAC), who traded their MGs for a pair of Super 2000-spec BMW 320si's acquired from BMW's works WTCC squads. Long-time collaborator Colin Turkington again headed the line-up, joined by reigning Renault Clio Cup champion Tom Onslow-Cole. Also running a 320si was former Production class race winner and reigning SEAT Cupra Cup champion Mat Jackson, making his debut in the top class of the BTCC with his family Jacksons M.Sport team.

Team Eurotech continued to run their ex-Dynamics Integra for team boss Mike Jordan for a second season, while Motorbase Performance abandoned their Integra and expanded to two ex-works Super 2000 SEAT Toledos, having run one in the closing rounds of 2006. Gareth Howell, who had raced a third Dynamics Integra in the latter stages of both 2005 and 2006, joined the team alongside former Clio Cup and British GT race-winner Matt Allison. Howell ran out of budget mid-season and was replaced first by Tom Ferrier, who had driven the car in 2006, and for the final round by ex-Vauxhall works driver Paul O'Neill.

WTCC Independent squad GR Asia also ran a Toledo for their expansion into the British championship, missing two rounds when their WTCC commitments left them unable to attend. The car was piloted by Adam Jones who had an impressive debut season in the BTCC aboard Xero Competition's Lexus the previous year. The team then added a Leon to their stable for the final three meetings. Former works Vauxhall driver Gavin Smith was behind the wheel for the first two, being replaced in the final round by the returning Rob Collard, who had abandoned his planned switch to the Porsche Carrera Cup Great Britain earlier in the season after a handful of races.

Quest Racing returned to the championship for a full campaign having joined the field in the second half of 2006, again fielding Irish youngster Eoin Murray in an ex-WTCC Alfa Romeo 156. The 156 was also the vehicle of choice for the brand-new A-Tech squad, with veteran David Pinkney joining the team from Motorbase alongside Richard Marsh, who had appeared in a Peugeot 307 for Team Griffin Racing the previous year.

Other returning independents included Kartworld Racing, who expanded a second ex-WSR MG ZS, with Fiona Leggate joining the team to partner team boss Jason Hughes after two years in a bio-ethanol powered Vauxhall Astra Coupe with Tech-Speed Motorsport, and BTC Racing, who took in a full season with their Lexus IS200s after debuting in the final two rounds of 2006. Chris Stockton remained from the previous year, and was joined by Nick Leason, who initially planned to run an Astra Coupe for Daniels Motorsport as he had done in the latter stages of 2006. Leason left the team after the first three meetings with the team cutting down to one car for Stockton.

Tech-Speed swapped the Astra Coupe for a newer Sport Hatch driven by former Turkish touring car champion Erkut Kizilirmak, who had trialed the car through two appearances for the works Vauxhall squad the previous year, while the list of returnees was completed by Geoff Steel Racing, who again ran Martyn Bell in their older-spec BMW 320i. A 320i was also purchased by former Dutch Supercar Challenge racer Jim Pocklington to race with his own J Team Motorsport squad in the first half of the year.

John George returned to the series for the first time since 2004 in an ex-Dynamics Integra run by former Production class entrant TH Motorsport, with club saloon driver Simon Blanckley also plumping for an Integra in his debut season in the category, running for his own Sibsport team with support from touring car preparation expert Graham Hathaway. Blanckley dropped out after the first seven meetings and sold his Integra to Robertshaw Racing, who entered Alan Taylor in the car for the last two meetings, with both team and driver stepping up from the Clio Cup.

One of the year's new entries came from the Team AFM Racing outfit, who fielded a self-built BMW 120d, the championship's first ever diesel-powered car, for team boss and long-time production BMW racer Rick Kerry.

With Encke Sport's entry failing to materialize, Nick Leason leaving Daniels Motorsport and Tech-Speed switching to the Astra Sport Hatch, 2007 was the first season since 2000 in which the Vauxhall Astra Coupe did not grace the grid.

=== Other changes ===
- In October 2005 Alan Gow announced that the 2007 championship will be contested by cars complying with the FIA's Super 2000 specification regulations.
- Cars built and raced to BTC-specification were still permitted to compete, although were ineligible for outright championship honours.
- The series had live coverage on ITV's digital channels for the first half of the season, returning to ITV1 for the final five race weekends. Full day's coverage (including support races) moved from MotorsTV to Setanta Sports.

== Entry list ==
The official entry list was published on 13 March 2007 following Media Day at Rockingham:

Team	Car	No.	Driver	Rounds
Works Entries
(United Kingdom) VX Racing	Vauxhall Vectra	5	(Italy) Fabrizio Giovanardi	All
(United Kingdom) VX Racing	Vauxhall Vectra	7	(United Kingdom) Tom Chilton	All
(United Kingdom) VX Racing	Vauxhall Vectra	88	(Switzerland) Alain Menu	10
(United Kingdom) SEAT Sport UK	SEAT León	11	(United Kingdom) Jason Plato	All
(United Kingdom) SEAT Sport UK	SEAT León	12	(United Kingdom) Darren Turner	All
(United Kingdom) SEAT Sport UK	SEAT León	22	(Netherlands) Tom Coronel	10
Constructor Entries
(United Kingdom) Team Halfords	Honda Civic	1	(United Kingdom) Matt Neal	All
(United Kingdom) Team Halfords	Honda Civic	52	(United Kingdom) Gordon Shedden	All
Independent S2000 Entries
(United Kingdom) Team RAC	BMW 320si	3	(United Kingdom) Colin Turkington	All
(United Kingdom) Team RAC	BMW 320si	33	(United Kingdom) Tom Onslow-Cole	All
(Hong Kong) GR Asia	SEAT León	8	(Republic of Ireland) Gavin Smith	8–9
(Hong Kong) GR Asia	SEAT León	18	(United Kingdom) Rob Collard	10
(Hong Kong) Team Air Cool	SEAT Toledo Cupra	21	(United Kingdom) Adam Jones	1–2, 5–6, 8–10
(United Kingdom) Quest Racing	Alfa Romeo 156	14	(Republic of Ireland) Eoin Murray	1–4, 6–8, 10
(United Kingdom) Team allaboutproperty.com	BMW 320i	15	(United Kingdom) Martyn Bell	All
(United Kingdom) AFM Racing	BMW 120d	17	(United Kingdom) Rick Kerry	1–3, 5, 7–8, 10
(United Kingdom) BTC Racing	Lexus IS200	19	(United Kingdom) Nick Leason	1–3
(United Kingdom) BTC Racing	Lexus IS200	43	(United Kingdom) Chris Stockton	All
(United Kingdom) Motorbase Performance	SEAT Toledo Cupra	23	(United Kingdom) Matt Allison	1–8, 10
(United Kingdom) Motorbase Performance	SEAT Toledo Cupra	24	(United Kingdom) Tom Ferrier	6–8
(United Kingdom) Motorbase Performance	SEAT Toledo Cupra	25	(United Kingdom) Gareth Howell	1–5
(United Kingdom) Motorbase Performance	SEAT Toledo Cupra	29	(United Kingdom) Paul O'Neill	10
(United Kingdom) J-Team Motorsport with Tech Tuning	BMW 320i	45	(United Kingdom) Jim Pocklington	1–2, 4–5
(United Kingdom) Jacksons M.Sport	BMW 320si	48	(United Kingdom) Mat Jackson	All
(United Kingdom) A-Tech	Alfa Romeo 156	56	(United Kingdom) Dave Pinkney	1–8, 10
(United Kingdom) A-Tech	Alfa Romeo 156	59	(United Kingdom) Richard Marsh	1–8
Independent BTC-T Entries
(United Kingdom) Kartworld Racing	MG ZS	28	(United Kingdom) Jason Hughes	All
(United Kingdom) Kartworld Racing	MG ZS	82	(United Kingdom) Fiona Leggate	All
(United Kingdom) Robertshaw Racing	Honda Integra Type-R	32	(United Kingdom) Alan Taylor	9–10
(United Kingdom) TH Motorsport with JAG Racing	Honda Integra Type-R	55	(United Kingdom) John George	All
(United Kingdom) Sibsport	Honda Integra Type-R	69	(United Kingdom) Simon Blanckley	1–7
(United Kingdom) Team Eurotech Racing with John Guest Speedfit	Honda Integra Type-R	77	(United Kingdom) Mike Jordan	All
(United Kingdom) Arkas Racing	Vauxhall Astra Sport Hatch	90	(Turkey) Erkut Kızılırmak	1–8, 10

- Team Halfords were neither a works or an independent entry.

== Race results ==
All races were held in the United Kingdom. The 2007 season again had ten race weekends with three BTCC rounds at each.

Round		Circuit	Date	Pole position	Fastest lap	Winning driver	Winning teams
1	R1	Brands Hatch Indy, Kent	1 April	(United Kingdom) Colin Turkington	(United Kingdom) Jason Plato	(United Kingdom) Jason Plato	SEAT Sport UK
1	R2	Brands Hatch Indy, Kent	1 April		(United Kingdom) Darren Turner	(United Kingdom) Jason Plato	SEAT Sport UK
1	R3	Brands Hatch Indy, Kent	1 April		(United Kingdom) Mat Jackson	(United Kingdom) Matt Neal	Team Halfords
2	R4	Rockingham Motor Speedway	22 April	(United Kingdom) Darren Turner	(Italy) Fabrizio Giovanardi	(Italy) Fabrizio Giovanardi	VX Racing
2	R5	Rockingham Motor Speedway	22 April		(United Kingdom) Darren Turner	(Italy) Fabrizio Giovanardi	VX Racing
2	R6	Rockingham Motor Speedway	22 April		(United Kingdom) Jason Plato	(United Kingdom) Jason Plato	SEAT Sport UK
3	R7	Thruxton Circuit, Hampshire	6 May	(Italy) Fabrizio Giovanardi	(United Kingdom) Tom Chilton	(Italy) Fabrizio Giovanardi	VX Racing
3	R8	Thruxton Circuit, Hampshire	6 May		(Italy) Fabrizio Giovanardi	(Italy) Fabrizio Giovanardi	VX Racing
3	R9	Thruxton Circuit, Hampshire	6 May		(United Kingdom) Gordon Shedden	(United Kingdom) Jason Plato	SEAT Sport UK
4	R10	Croft Circuit, Yorkshire	3 June	(United Kingdom) Gordon Shedden	(United Kingdom) Colin Turkington	(United Kingdom) Colin Turkington	Team RAC
4	R11	Croft Circuit, Yorkshire	3 June		(United Kingdom) Darren Turner	(United Kingdom) Darren Turner	SEAT Sport UK
4	R12	Croft Circuit, Yorkshire	3 June		(Italy) Fabrizio Giovanardi	(Italy) Fabrizio Giovanardi	VX Racing
5	R13	Oulton Park Island, Cheshire	24 June	(United Kingdom) Colin Turkington	(United Kingdom) Colin Turkington	(United Kingdom) Gordon Shedden	Team Halfords
5	R14	Oulton Park Island, Cheshire	24 June		(Italy) Fabrizio Giovanardi (United Kingdom) Mike Jordan	(United Kingdom) Colin Turkington	Team RAC
5	R15	Oulton Park Island, Cheshire	24 June		(United Kingdom) Gordon Shedden	(United Kingdom) Mat Jackson	Jacksons M.Sport
6	R16	Donington Park National	15 July	(United Kingdom) Gordon Shedden	(United Kingdom) Matt Neal	(United Kingdom) Gordon Shedden	Team Halfords
6	R17	Donington Park National	15 July		(United Kingdom) Jason Plato	(United Kingdom) Jason Plato	SEAT Sport UK
6	R18	Donington Park National	15 July		(United Kingdom) Matt Neal	(United Kingdom) Jason Plato	SEAT Sport UK
7	R19	Snetterton Motor Racing Circuit, Norfolk	29 July	(United Kingdom) Colin Turkington	(United Kingdom) Tom Chilton	(United Kingdom) Gordon Shedden	Team Halfords
7	R20	Snetterton Motor Racing Circuit, Norfolk	29 July		(United Kingdom) Matt Neal	(Italy) Fabrizio Giovanardi	VX Racing
7	R21	Snetterton Motor Racing Circuit, Norfolk	29 July		(United Kingdom) Gordon Shedden	(United Kingdom) Tom Onslow-Cole	Team RAC
8	R22	Brands Hatch Indy, Kent	19 August	(United Kingdom) Colin Turkington	(United Kingdom) Darren Turner	(Italy) Fabrizio Giovanardi	VX Racing
8	R23	Brands Hatch Indy, Kent	19 August		(United Kingdom) Colin Turkington	(Italy) Fabrizio Giovanardi	VX Racing
8	R24	Brands Hatch Indy, Kent	19 August		(United Kingdom) Mike Jordan	(United Kingdom) Colin Turkington	Team RAC
9	R25	Knockhill Racing Circuit, Fife	2 September	(United Kingdom) Darren Turner	(United Kingdom) Gordon Shedden	(United Kingdom) Darren Turner	SEAT Sport UK
9	R26	Knockhill Racing Circuit, Fife	2 September		(United Kingdom) Gordon Shedden	(United Kingdom) Darren Turner	SEAT Sport UK
9	R27	Knockhill Racing Circuit, Fife	2 September		(United Kingdom) Gordon Shedden	(United Kingdom) Gordon Shedden	Team Halfords
10	R28	Thruxton Circuit, Hampshire	14 October	(United Kingdom) Tom Chilton	(United Kingdom) Tom Chilton	(Italy) Fabrizio Giovanardi	VX Racing
10	R29	Thruxton Circuit, Hampshire	14 October		(United Kingdom) Matt Neal	(Italy) Fabrizio Giovanardi	VX Racing
10	R30	Thruxton Circuit, Hampshire	14 October		(United Kingdom) Mike Jordan	(United Kingdom) Mat Jackson	Jacksons M.Sport

== Final championship standings ==
Points system
**1st**	**2nd**	**3rd**	**4th**	**5th**	**6th**	**7th**	**8th**	**9th**	**10th**	Fastest lap	Lead a lap
15	12	10	8	6	5	4	3	2	1	1	1

- No driver may collect more than one "Lead a Lap" point per race no matter how many laps they lead.
- Race 1 polesitter receives 1 point.

=== Drivers' Championship ===
Pos	Driver	BHI			ROC			THR			CRO			OUL			DON			SNE			BHI			KNO			THR			Pts
1	(Italy) Fabrizio Giovanardi	10	7	**2**	1*	**1***	5	**1***	**1***	4	6	6	1*	2	2	Ret	8	3	11	5	1*	3	1*	**1***	4	6	3	5	1*	**1***	2	300
2	(United Kingdom) Jason Plato	1*	**1***	4	3	5	1*	2	6	1*	7	2*	8	7	5	2	5	1*	1*	8	3	4	2	2	5	3	5	3	2	2	4	297
3	(United Kingdom) Gordon Shedden	8	Ret	Ret	4	Ret	6	Ret	8	2	**2**	Ret*	4	1*	**Ret**	4	**1***	**2***	5	1*	**Ret***	5	Ret	3	2	Ret	4	1*	3	Ret	9	200
4	(United Kingdom) Matt Neal	3	5	1*	5	Ret	7	5	2	5	3	13	6	4	4	Ret	3	4	2	18	2	2	Ret	DNS	DNS	Ret	6	2*	5	3	5	195
5	(United Kingdom) Colin Turkington	**2**	2	Ret	7	Ret	Ret	4	5*	17	1*	**Ret***	9	**3***	1*	Ret	7	9	**6***	**DSQ**	9	6	**4***	9	1*	2	2	6	6	4	11	184
6	(United Kingdom) Darren Turner	Ret	4	DSQ	**Ret**	6	3	3	Ret	6	4	1*	5	Ret	7	3	12	6	9	6	4	9	3	Ret	15	**1***	**1***	7	18	11	6	160
7	(United Kingdom) Mat Jackson	DSQ	8	3	10	4	2	Ret	Ret	DNS	9	4	3	5	6	1*	9	10	4	4	5	7	Ret	4	3	Ret	10	9	7	5	1*	158
8	(United Kingdom) Mike Jordan	4	Ret	8	6	Ret	8	10	4	3	5	3	10	8	3	9	4	7	3*	7	Ret	DNS	13	5	8*	5	8	**4***	Ret	8	Ret	131
9	(United Kingdom) Tom Chilton	6	3	7	2	3	4	6	3	8	8	Ret	7	6	9	6	15	12	7	3	8	8	6	Ret	9	Ret	11	Ret	**Ret***	9	3	130
10	(United Kingdom) Tom Onslow-Cole	5	15	6	8	2	Ret	8	7	10	Ret	7	2*	9	13	7	10	11	8	2*	6	**1***	5	Ret	6	DSQ	13	10	10	10	Ret	109
11	(United Kingdom) Adam Jones	7	6	5	DNS	DNS	DNS							Ret	8	**5**	2	5	Ret				7	6	**Ret**	4	7	8	9	12	7	72
12	(United Kingdom) Matt Allison	12	9	10	11	7	9	7	Ret	11	Ret	Ret	Ret	Ret	10	8	6	8	10	12	10	Ret	9	Ret	12				Ret	Ret	Ret	29
13	(Republic of Ireland) Gavin Smith																						8	7	7	7	9	11				17
14	(United Kingdom) Gareth Howell	9	11	9	Ret	Ret	Ret	11	Ret	7	10	5	Ret	10	Ret	DNS																16
15	(Switzerland) Alain Menu																												4	6	12	13
16	(United Kingdom) Jason Hughes	Ret	Ret	12	12	9	Ret	12	9	9	Ret	8	11	11	Ret	DNS	Ret	Ret	15	10	11	13	Ret	8	11	Ret	14	12	14	Ret	14	13
17	(Netherlands) Tom Coronel																												8	7	**8**	10
18	(Republic of Ireland) Eoin Murray	DNS	DNS	DNS	9	Ret	Ret	9	Ret	DNS	Ret	Ret	DNS				11	Ret	Ret	Ret	7	10	Ret	DNS	Ret				12	Ret	Ret	9
19	(United Kingdom) John George	19	16	19	14	10	**Ret**	Ret	DNS	12	17	9	**Ret**	15	11	Ret	Ret	Ret	19	13	13	17	Ret	NC	10	8	12	Ret	16	13	13	7
20	(United Kingdom) David Pinkney	20	Ret	13	13	8	12	15	10	**13***	Ret	Ret	12	Ret	Ret	DNS	16	16	14	Ret	Ret	Ret	Ret	DNS	DNS				Ret	Ret	15	5
21	(United Kingdom) Martyn Bell	13	13	11	15	12	Ret	13	Ret	15	14	12	Ret	13	14	10	Ret	20	20	15	12	16	Ret	Ret	14	9	17	13	Ret	16	Ret	3
22	(United Kingdom) Tom Ferrier																Ret	14	12	9	Ret	12	Ret	DNS	DNS							2
23	(United Kingdom) Chris Stockton	11	10	Ret	17	DNS	DNS	Ret	DNS	Ret	11	10	Ret	Ret	12	Ret	Ret	13	16	Ret	Ret	14	11	Ret	DNS	DNS	DNS	DNS	DNS	DNS	DNS	2
24	(Turkey) Erkut Kizilirmak	14	12	15	16	DNS	11	17	13	14	13	Ret	Ret	14	Ret	11	14	15	13	11	Ret	11	10	10	Ret				15	Ret	Ret	2
25	(United Kingdom) Simon Blanckley	16	14	16	Ret	Ret	10	18	11	16	12	Ret	DNS	12	Ret	DNS	Ret	17	Ret	16	14	15										1
26	(United Kingdom) Alan Taylor																									10	16	Ret	17	Ret	17	1
27	(United Kingdom) Rob Collard																												11	Ret	10	1
28	(United Kingdom) Rick Kerry	17	19	18	NC	11	14	NC	14	Ret				17	16	12				DNS	Ret	DNS	Ret	DNS	16				Ret	15	19	0
29	(United Kingdom) Jim Pocklington	18	18	Ret	Ret	Ret	Ret				16	11	14	18	17	Ret																0
30	(United Kingdom) Richard Marsh	Ret	17	17	Ret	DNS	DNS	16	Ret	Ret	18	Ret	DNS	Ret	DNS	Ret	13	18	17	14	Ret	DNS	12	11	13							0
31	(United Kingdom) Fiona Leggate	Ret	DNS	14	Ret	DNS	Ret	14	12	Ret	15	Ret	13	16	15	Ret	Ret	19	18	17	Ret	DNS	Ret	DNS	Ret	Ret	15	14	19	DNS	18	0
32	(United Kingdom) Nick Leason	15	DNS	DNS	18	Ret	13	Ret	DNS	DNS																						0
33	(United Kingdom) Paul O'Neill																												13	14	16	0
Pos	Driver	BHI			ROC			THR			CRO			OUL			DON			SNE			BHI			KNO			THR			Pts
Sources:

- Note: **bold** signifies pole position (1 point given in first race only, and race 2 and 3 poles are based on race results), italics signifies fastest lap (1 point given all races) and * signifies at least one lap in the lead (1 point given all races).

=== Manufacturers Championship ===
Pos	Manufacturer	BHI			ROC			THR			CRO			OUL			DON			SNE			BHI			KNO			THR			Pts
1	Vauxhall / VX Racing	6	3	2	1	1	4	1	1	4	6	6	1	2	2	6	8	3	7	3	1	3	1	1	4	6	3	5	1	1	2	637
1	Vauxhall / VX Racing	10	7	7	2	3	5	6	3	8	8	Ret	7	6	9	Ret	15	12	11	5	8	8	6	Ret	9	Ret	11	Ret	4	6	12	637
2	SEAT / SEAT Sport UK	1	1	4	3	5	1	2	6	1	4	1	5	7	5	2	5	1	1	6	3	4	2	2	5	1	1	3	2	2	4	623
2	SEAT / SEAT Sport UK	Ret	4	DSQ	Ret	6	3	3	Ret	6	7	2	8	Ret	7	3	12	6	9	8	4	9	3	Ret	15	3	5	7	8	7	6	623

=== Teams Championship ===
Pos	Team	BHI			ROC			THR			CRO			OUL			DON			SNE			BHI			KNO			THR			Pts
1	SEAT Sport UK	1	1	4	3	5	1	2	6	1	4	1	5	7	5	2	5	1	1	6	3	4	2	2	5	1	1	3	2	2	4	446
1	SEAT Sport UK	Ret	4	DSQ	Ret	6	3	3	Ret	6	7	2	8	Ret	7	3	12	6	9	8	4	9	3	Ret	15	3	5	7	8	7	6	446
2	VX Racing	6	3	2	1	1	4	1	1	4	6	6	1	2	2	6	8	3	7	3	1	3	1	1	4	6	3	5	1	1	2	421
2	VX Racing	10	7	7	2	3	5	6	3	8	8	Ret	7	6	9	Ret	15	12	11	5	8	8	6	Ret	9	Ret	11	Ret	4	6	3	421
3	Team Halfords	3	5	1	4	Ret	6	5	2	2	2	13	4	1	4	4	1	2	2	1	2	2	Ret	3	2	Ret	4	1	3	3	5	345***
3	Team Halfords	8	Ret	Ret	5	Ret	7	Ret	8	5	3	Ret	6	4	Ret	Ret	3	4	5	18	Ret	5	Ret	DNS	DNS	Ret	6	2	5	Ret	9	345***
4	Team RAC	2	2	6	7	2	Ret	4	5	10	1	7	2	3	1	7	7	9	6	2	6	1	4	9	1	2	2	6	6	4	11	277
4	Team RAC	5	15	Ret	8	Ret	Ret	8	7	17	Ret	Ret	9	9	13	Ret	10	11	8	DSQ	9	6	5	Ret	6	DSQ	13	10	10	10	Ret	277
5	Jacksons Msport	DSQ	8	3	10	4	2	Ret	Ret	DNS	9	4	3	5	6	1	9	10	4	4	5	7	Ret	4	3	Ret	10	9	7	5	1	155
6	Team Eurotech Racing	4	Ret	8	6	Ret	8	10	4	3	5	3	10	8	3	9	4	7	3	7	Ret	DNS	13	5	8	5	8	4	Ret	8	Ret	125
7	Team Air Cool	7	6	5	DNS	DNS	DNS							Ret	8	5	2	5	Ret				7	6	Ret	4	7	8	9	12	7	73
8	Motorbase Performance	9	9	9	11	7	9	7	Ret	7	10	5	Ret	10	10	8	6	8	10	9	10	12	9	Ret	12				13	14	16	47
8	Motorbase Performance	12	11	10	Ret	Ret	DNS	11	Ret	11	Ret	Ret	Ret	Ret	Ret	DNS	Ret	14	12	12	Ret	Ret	Ret	DNS	DNS				Ret	Ret	Ret	47
9	GR-Asia																						8	7	7	7	9	11	11	Ret	10	19
10	Kartworld Racing	Ret	Ret	12	12	9	Ret	12	9	9	15	8	11	11	15	Ret	Ret	19	15	10	11	13	Ret	8	11	Ret	14	12	14	Ret	14	13
10	Kartworld Racing	Ret	DNS	14	Ret	DNS	Ret	14	12	Ret	Ret	Ret	13	16	Ret	DNS	Ret	Ret	18	17	Ret	DNS	Ret	DNS	Ret	Ret	15	14	19	DNS	18	13
11	TH Motorsport/Racing with JAG	19	16	19	14	10	Ret	Ret	DNS	12	17	9	Ret	15	11	Ret	Ret	Ret	19	13	13	17	Ret	NC	10	8	12	Ret	16	13	13	7
12	A-Tech	20	16	13	13	8	12	15	10	13	18	Ret	12	Ret	Ret	Ret	13	16	14	14	Ret	Ret	12	11	13				Ret	Ret	15	4
12	A-Tech	Ret	Ret	17	Ret	DNS	DNS	16	Ret	Ret	Ret	Ret	DNS	Ret	DNS	DNS	16	18	17	Ret	Ret	DNS	Ret	DNS	DNS							4
13	Team AllaboutProperty.com	13	13	11	15	12	DNS	13	Ret	15	14	12	Ret	13	14	10	Ret	20	20	15	12	16	Ret	Ret	14	9	17	13	Ret	16	Ret	3
14	Arkas Racing	14	12	15	16	DNS	11	17	13	14	13	Ret	Ret	14	Ret	11	14	15	13	11	Ret	11	10	10	Ret				15	Ret	Ret	2
15	Robertshaw Racing																									10	16	Ret	17	Ret	17	1
16	Quest Racing	DNS	DNS	DNS	9	Ret	Ret	9	Ret	DNS	Ret	Ret	Ret				11	Ret	Ret	Ret	7	10	Ret	DNS	Ret				12	Ret	Ret	0*
17	Sibsport	16	14	16	Ret	Ret	10	18	11	16	12	Ret	DNS	12	Ret	DNS	Ret	17	Ret	16	14	15										0*
18	J Team Motorsport	18	18	Ret	Ret	Ret	Ret				16	11	14	18	17	Ret																0
19	Team AFM Racing	17	19	18	NC	11	14	NC	14	Ret				17	16	12				DNS	Ret	DNS	Ret	DNS	16				Ret	15	19	0
20	BTC Racing	11	10	Ret	17	Ret	13	Ret	DNS	Ret	11	10	Ret	Ret	12	Ret	Ret	13	16	Ret	Ret	14	11	Ret	DNS	DNS	DNS	DNS	DNS	DNS	DNS	0*
20	BTC Racing	15	DNS	DNS	18	DNS	DNS	Ret	DNS	DNS																						0*
Pos	Team	BHI			ROC			THR			CRO			OUL			DON			SNE			BHI			KNO			THR			Pts

Note – * denotes engine change penalty

=== Independents Trophy ===
Pos	Driver	BHI			ROC			THR			CRO			OUL			DON			SNE			BHI			KNO			THR			Pts
1	(United Kingdom) Colin Turkington	**2**	**2**	Ret	7	Ret	Ret	4	**5**	17	**1**	**Ret**	9	**3**	**1**	Ret	7	9	**6**	**DSQ**	9	6	**4**	**9**	1	**2**	**2**	6	**6**	**4**	11	285
2	(United Kingdom) Mat Jackson	DSQ	8	3	10	4	2	Ret	Ret	DNS	9	4	3	5	6	1	**9**	10	4	4	5	7	Ret	4	3	Ret	10	9	7	5	**1**	270
3	(United Kingdom) Mike Jordan	4	Ret	8	6	**Ret**	8	**10**	4	3	5	3	10	8	3	9	4	7	3	7	Ret	DNS	13	5	8	5	8	**4**	Ret	8	Ret	260
4	(United Kingdom) Tom Onslow-Cole	5	15	6	8	2	Ret	8	7	10	Ret	7	2	9	13	7	10	11	8	2	**6**	**1**	5	Ret	6	DSQ	13	10	10	10	Ret	226
5	(United Kingdom) Adam Jones	7	6	**5**	DNS	DNS	DNS							Ret	8	**5**	2	**5**	Ret				7	6	**Ret**	4	7	8	9	12	7	164
6	(United Kingdom) Matt Allison	12	9	10	11	7	9	7	Ret	11	Ret	Ret	Ret	Ret	10	8	6	8	10	12	10	Ret	9	Ret	12				Ret	Ret	Ret	119
7	(United Kingdom) Jason Hughes	Ret	Ret	12	12	9	Ret	12	9	9	Ret	8	11	11	Ret	DNS	Ret	Ret	15	10	11	13	Ret	8	11	Ret	14	12	14	Ret	14	94
8	(United Kingdom) Gareth Howell	9	11	9	Ret	Ret	DNS	11	Ret	7	10	5	Ret	10	Ret	DNS																58
9	(Turkey) Erkut Kizilirmak	14	12	15	16	DNS	11	17	13	14	13	Ret	Ret	14	Ret	11	14	15	13	11	Ret	11	10	10	Ret				15	Ret	Ret	58
10	(United Kingdom) John George	19	16	19	14	10	**Ret**	Ret	DNS	12	17	9	**Ret**	15	11	Ret	Ret	Ret	19	13	13	17	Ret	NC	10	8	12	Ret	16	13	13	56
11	(United Kingdom) Martyn Bell	13	13	11	15	12	DNS	13	Ret	15	14	12	Ret	13	14	10	Ret	20	20	15	12	16	Ret	Ret	14	9	17	13	Ret	16	Ret	55
12	(Republic of Ireland) Gavin Smith																						8	7	7	7	9	11				45
13	(Republic of Ireland) Eoin Murray	DNS	DNS	DNS	**9**	Ret	Ret	9	Ret	DNS	Ret	Ret	Ret	Ret			11	Ret	Ret	Ret	7	10	Ret	DNS	Ret				12	Ret	Ret	43
14	(United Kingdom) David Pinkney	20	Ret	13	13	8	12	15	10	**13**	Ret	Ret	12	Ret	Ret	DNS	16	16	14	Ret	Ret	Ret	Ret	DNS	DNS				Ret	Ret	15	43
15	(United Kingdom) Chris Stockton	11	10	Ret	17	DNS	DNS	Ret	DNS	Ret	11	10	Ret	Ret	12	Ret	Ret	13	16	Ret	Ret	14	11	Ret	DNS	DNS	DNS	DNS	DNS	DNS	DNS	37
16	(United Kingdom) Simon Blanckley	16	14	16	Ret	Ret	10	18	11	16	12	Ret	DNS	12	Ret	DNS	Ret	17	Ret	16	14	15										29
17	(United Kingdom) Tom Ferrier																Ret	14	12	9	Ret	12	Ret	DNS	DNS							21
18	(United Kingdom) Fiona Leggate	Ret	DNS	14	Ret	DNS	Ret	14	12	Ret	15	Ret	13	16	15	Ret	Ret	19	18	17	Ret	DNS	Ret	DNS	Ret	Ret	15	14	19	DNS	18	19
19	(United Kingdom) Rob Collard																												11	Ret	10	16
20	(United Kingdom) Rick Kerry	17	19	18	NC	11	14	NC	14	Ret				17	16	12				DNS	Ret	DNS	Ret	DNS	16				Ret	15	19	14
21	(United Kingdom) Richard Marsh	Ret	17	17	Ret	DNS	DNS	16	Ret	Ret	18	Ret	DNS	Ret	DNS	Ret	13	18	17	14	Ret	DNS	12	11	13							13
22	(United Kingdom) Paul O'Neill																												13	14	16	10
23	(United Kingdom) Jim Pocklington	18	18	Ret	Ret	Ret	Ret				16	11	14	18	17	Ret																7
24	(United Kingdom) Alan Taylor																									10	16	Ret	17	Ret	17	7
25	(United Kingdom) Nick Leason	15	DNS	DNS	18	Ret	13	Ret	DNS	DNS																						5
Pos	Driver	BHI			ROC			THR			CRO			OUL			DON			SNE			BHI			KNO			THR			Pts

=== Independent Teams Championship ===
Pos	Team	BHI			ROC			THR			CRO			OUL			DON			SNE			BHI			KNO			THR			Pts
1	Team RAC	2	2	6	7	2	Ret	4	5	10	1	7	2	3	1	7	7	9	6	2	6	1	4	9	1	2	2	6	6	4	11	363
2	Jackson Msport	DSQ	8	3	10	4	2	Ret	Ret	DNS	9	4	3	5	6	1	9	10	4	4	5	7	Ret	4	3	Ret	10	9	7	5	1	274
3	Team Eurotech Racing	4	Ret	8	6	Ret	8	10	4	3	5	3	10	8	3	9	4	7	3	7	Ret	DNS	13	5	8	5	8	4	Ret	8	Ret	267
4	Motorbase Performance	9	9	9	11	7	9	7	Ret	7	10	5	Ret	10	10	8	6	8	10	9	10	12	9	Ret	12				13	14	16	186
5	Team Air Cool	7	6	5	DNS	DNS	DNS							Ret	8	5	2	5	Ret				7	6	Ret	4	7	8	9	12	7	170
6	Kartworld Racing	Ret	Ret	12	12	9	Ret	12	9	9	15	8	11	11	15	Ret	Ret	19	15	10	11	13	Ret	8	11	Ret	14	12	14	Ret	14	116
7	Arkas Racing	14	12	15	16	DNS	11	17	13	14	13	Ret	Ret	14	Ret	11	14	15	13	11	Ret	11	10	10	Ret				15	Ret	Ret	80
8	Team AllaboutProperty.com	13	13	11	15	12	DNS	13	Ret	15	14	12	Ret	13	14	10	Ret	20	20	15	12	16	Ret	Ret	14	9	17	14	Ret	16	Ret	74
9	A-Tech	20	17	13	13	8	12	15	10	13	18	Ret	12	Ret	Ret	Ret	13	16	14	14	Ret	Ret	12	11	13				Ret	Ret	15	73
10	TH Motorsport/Racing with JAG	19	16	19	14	10	Ret	Ret	DNS	12	17	9	Ret	15	11	Ret	Ret	Ret	19	13	13	17	Ret	NC	10	8	12	Ret	16	13	13	68
11	GR-Asia																						8	7	7	7	9	11	11	Ret	10	68
12	Quest Racing	DNS	DNS	DNS	9	Ret	Ret	9	Ret	DNS	Ret	Ret	Ret				11	Ret	Ret	Ret	7	10	Ret	DNS	Ret				12	Ret	Ret	41*
13	BTC Racing	11	10	Ret	17	Ret	13	Ret	DNS	Ret	11	10	Ret	Ret	12	Ret	Ret	13	16	Ret	Ret	14	11	Ret	DNS	DNS	DNS	DNS	DNS	DNS	DNS	37*
14	Sibsport	16	14	16	Ret	Ret	10	18	11	16	12	Ret	DNS	12	Ret	DNS	Ret	17	Ret	16	14	15										34*
15	Team AFM Racing	17	19	18	NC	11	14	NC	14	Ret				17	16	12				DNS	Ret	DNS	Ret	DNS	16				Ret	15	19	24
16	J Team Motorsport	18	18	Ret	Ret	Ret	Ret				16	11	14	18	17	Ret																10
17	Robertshaw Racing																									10	16	Ret	17	Ret	17	10
Pos	Team	BHI			ROC			THR			CRO			OUL			DON			SNE			BHI			KNO			THR			Pts

Note – * denotes engine change penalty
