= Pocklington (surname) =

Pocklington is a surname. Notable people with the surname include:

- Henry Cabourn Pocklington (1870–1952), English teacher, physicist, and mathematician
- Jeremy Pocklington (born 1973), British civil servant
- Jim Pocklington (born 1963), British racing driver
- Peter Pocklington (born 1941), Canadian entrepreneur
