= Eoin Murray =

Irish racing driver (born 1982)

- Nationality: (Republic of Ireland) Irish

Previous series
- 2006: British Touring Car Championship

Eoin Murray (born 9 December 1982) is an Irish racing driver. After winning the European Alfa Romeo 147 Challenge in 2005, he made his BTCC debut in the middle of 2006.

== Early years ==
Murray had a successful career in karts, culminating in victory in the Formula A championship of 1999. He dabbled in rallycross that winter, winning six races. In 2000, he raced Fiats and Ford Fiestas in one-make championship, doing well enough to be nominated for the Young Irish Racing Driver of the Year award. In 2001, he did the full Fiesta UK Championship winning the Newcomers Cup and collecting two pole positions, two fastest laps & eight podium finishes. He crowned that achievement by winning the Jimmy Millard Trophy. He switched to Clio's for 2002 competing in the Elf Renaultsport UK Clio Cup where he scored two podium finishes and took seventh overall in the championship which was no mean achievement in his rookie year. Murray stuck with the Clio's for 2003 and had four race wins, four-second places, & two third places and came third overall in the Elf Clio UK Championship. During this time, he continued to compete in British & Irish Rallycross in the Stockhatch class, in a self run Peugeot 205 GTI, where he enjoyed considerable success and took several race wins and podium finishes. He was awarded the Dunlop/ Motorsport Ireland Young Driver of the year for 2003. This accolade together with a substantial boost to his budget from Motorsport Ireland and the Irish Sports Council launched his move to Europe where he competed in the European Alfa Romeo Challenge.

== European Alfa Challenge ==
For 2004, Murray switched to racing in mainland Europe, in the Alfa Romeo 147 challenge. He lacked circuit knowledge in his rookie season, but still won two races to come fourth overall. In 2005, he converted all this into a title winning season. He only won one race, but took four pole positions, nine podiums and four lap records. However his efforts did not go unnoticed in Ireland where he again won the Dunlop/Motorsport Ireland Young Driver of the year for the second time. Eoin competed in the European Alfa Romeo Challenge again in 2005 and started as one of the favourites. Murray did not disappoint and won the championship in Valencia along with nine podium finishes, five fastest laps, four pole positions and three lap records. And in the process winning a 05 spec Alfa 156 S2000 worth 200,000 euro, the biggest prize an Irish driver has ever won. He also won the 05 Rallycross Stockhatch Championship and these achievements won him the accolade as Ireland international driver of the year.

== BTCC ==
This earned Murray a factory-prepared WTCC-spec Alfa 156, although not the funding or team to run it. He contacted Quest Racing, which was essentially the GA team minus its former boss Gary Ayles and they sought funding. This arrived in time for round 5 at Croft, just days after team boss Ian Blackman died in a motorcycle accident. Despite the weight penalty for mid-season entrants in their first round, he finished tenth in race one to score his first championship point. At Donington Park he was more competitive, running 6th in race one until contact, before finishing sixth in race 2, and running third in race 3 before going off in slippery conditions.

Murray continued to drive his Quest Racing Alfa in the BTCC in 2007. He qualified 12th at round one, but an engine failure prevented them taking part in the races. After a 9th-place finish in race one at Thruxton, he had an engine failure in race 2, leaving the team unable to start round 3. The misfortune continued at Brands Hatch meeting 2 in October, when he was one of 11 drivers involved in a shunt triggered by Mat Jackson. The car was not fully repairable and a lack of parts causes him to miss the next round at Knockhill. The team did not continue for 2008, leaving Murray without a drive, although he participated in the SEAT León Eurocup, finishing third in the standings.

== Seat Leon Eurocup ==
In 2008, Murray was reunited with the Italian team PRS Group in which he won the 2005 European Alfa Challenge with. Although it was a rookie year for Murray and his team with the Seat Leon Supercopa, they enjoyed a very successful year fighting for overall championship victory until the final round at Monza. Murray finished third in the standings and won races at Valencia and Brands Hatch.

== Seat Leon Supercopa ==
In 2009, Murray signed with Oasis Motorsport to compete in the Spanish Seat series with the opportunity of winning considerable prize money. Although Murray fought for the championship up until the final race, a collision in the final race in Barcelona resulted in him finishing fourth.

== Racing record ==
=== Complete British Touring Car Championship results ===
(key) (Races in bold indicate pole position – 1 point awarded in first race) (Races in italics indicate fastest lap – 1 point awarded all races) (* signifies that driver lead race for at least one lap – 1 point awarded all races)

Year	Team	Car	1	2	3	4	5	6	7	8	9	10	11	12	13	14	15	16	17	18	19	20	21	22	23	24	25	26	27	28	29	30	DC	Pts
2006	Quest Racing	Alfa Romeo 156	BRH; 1	BRH; 2	BRH; 3	MON; 1	MON; 2	MON; 3	OUL; 1	OUL; 2	OUL; 3	THR; 1	THR; 2	THR; 3	CRO; 1; 10	CRO; 2; 11	CRO; 3; 12	DON; 1; 13	DON; 2; 6	DON; 3 Ret	SNE; 1 Ret	SNE; 2; 10	SNE; 3; 10	KNO; 1	KNO; 2	KNO; 3	BRH; 1 Ret	BRH; 2 DNS	BRH; 3 DNS	SIL; 1 Ret	SIL; 2 DNS	SIL; 3 DNS	17th	8
2007	Quest Racing	Alfa Romeo 156	BRH; 1 DNS	BRH; 2 DNS	BRH; 3 DNS	ROC; 1; 9	ROC; 2 Ret	ROC; 3 Ret	THR; 1; 9	THR; 2 Ret	THR; 3 DNS	CRO; 1 Ret	CRO; 2 Ret	CRO; 3 DNS	OUL; 1	OUL; 2	OUL; 3	DON; 1; 11	DON; 2 Ret	DON; 3 Ret	SNE; 1 Ret	SNE; 2; 7	SNE; 3; 10	BRH; 1 Ret	BRH; 2 DNS	BRH; 3 Ret	KNO; 1	KNO; 2	KNO; 3	THR; 1; 12	THR; 2 Ret	THR; 3 Ret	18th	9
