= Simon Blanckley =

British racing driver (born 1967)

Simon Blanckley (born 29 October 1967) is a British racing driver from Durham and former driver in the British Touring Car Championship. He began racing in 2000 having followed in the footsteps of his uncle, John Blanckley, a World Sportscar racer and Historic rally driver.

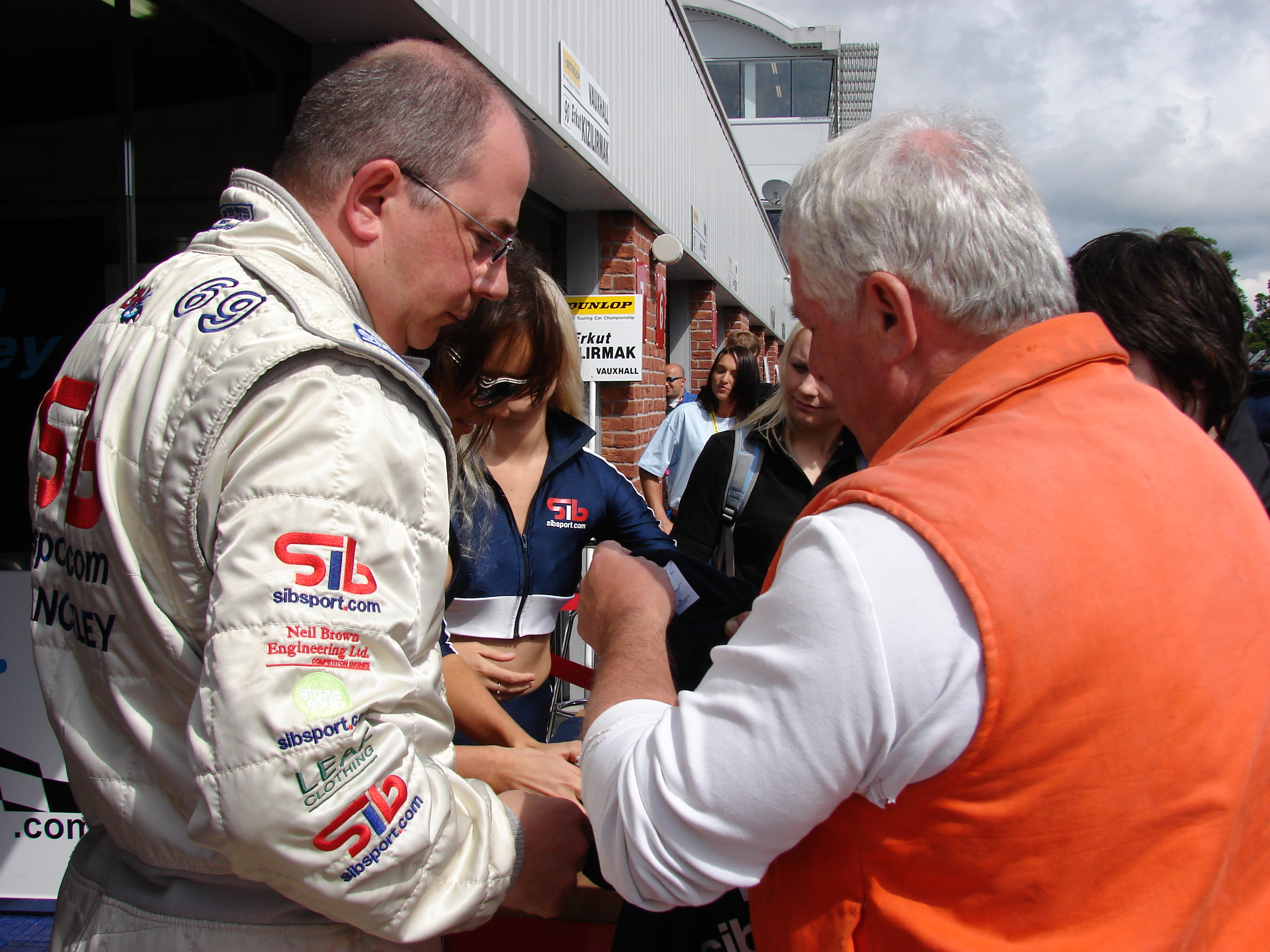
Autograph session 2007 Croft BTCC

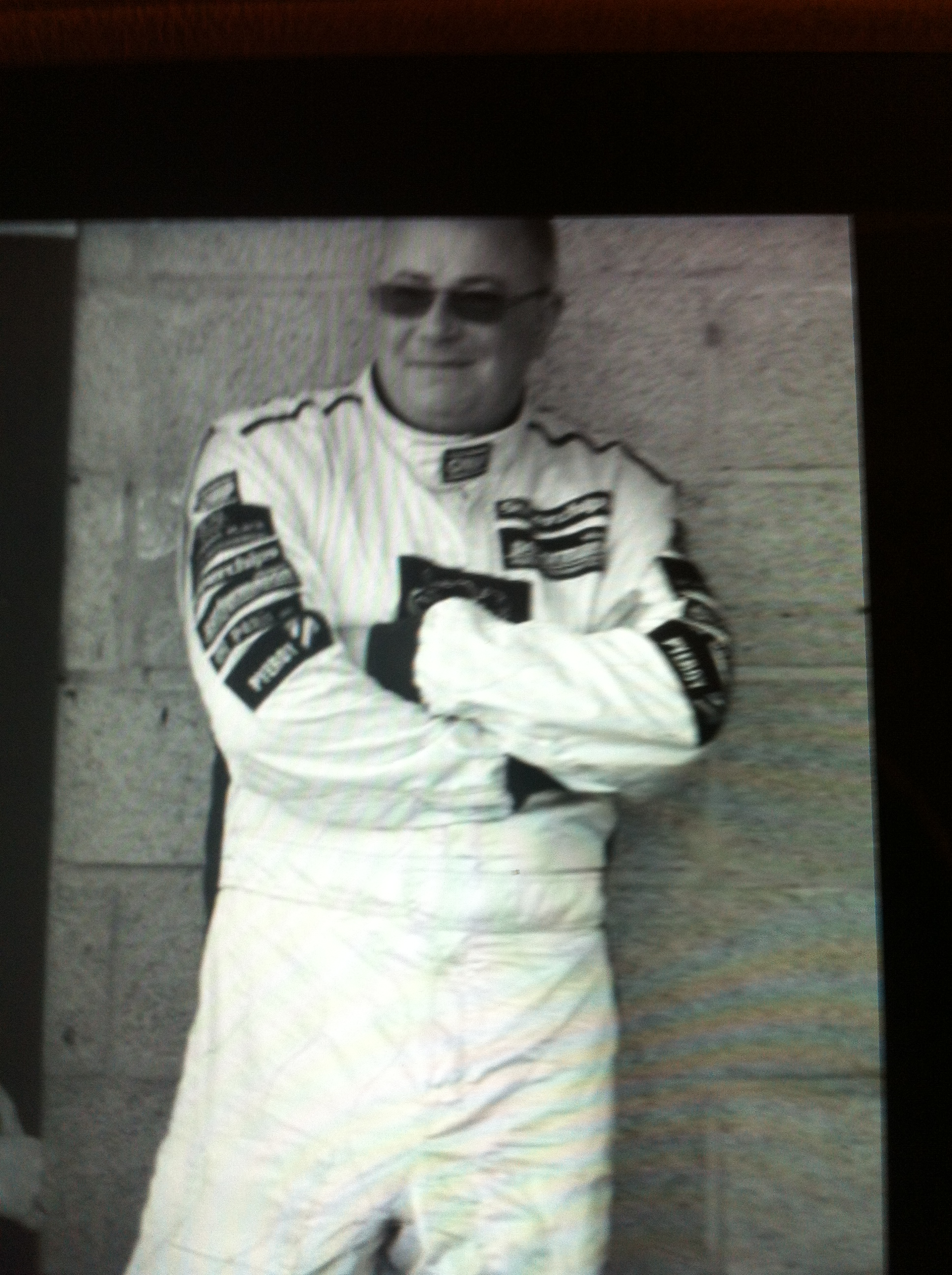
Spa GT Cup Endurance - 2011 Race Win

In 2006, Blanckley competed in the Super Touring Car Cup with LMA in an ex Works Honda Accord Super Tourer run by Graham Hathaway. He won every race he entered that season bar one.

Blanckley then moved up to the BTCC in 2007. He raced an ex Team Halfords Honda Integra under the banner of his newly formed Team Sibsport Performance working with former Independent Champion team owner Graham Hathaway. The Season was a steep learning curve for Blanckley, however several top-ten running positions and as high as sixth at his home Circuit of Croft. They scored a point at Rockingham with a top-ten finish which was a massive achievement for a Privateer Team in a very competitive season . At Oulton Park, he missed race 3 due to accident damage sustained during race 2. At Donington Park he had pace but no results. Before round 8 the team pulled out, due to Blanckley's work commitments.

2008 saw multiple wins in the new Seat Leon Supercopa culminating in races in Spain at the end of the year.

Sibsport then purchased a Porsche 997 GT3 Cup and again many podiums and a Win at Spa in the GT Cup were achieved.

2017 saw Sibsport move to Historics and compete at the Goodwood Revival in an Austin A40 with Matt Neal sharing the drive with Blanckley. An eighth overall finish was a great effort against more powerful machinery.

== Career ==
- 2022 - HRDC Austin A40 - 2 Wins
- 2020- MRL Dolomite Sprint - 2 Class wins
- 2017- HRDC Austin A40
- 2014 - GT Cup - Porsche GT3 Cup
- 2013 - GT Cup - Porsche GT3 Cup
- 2012 - Team Principal Sibsport Performance Carrera Cup GB
- 2011 - GT Cup - Porsche GT3 Cup 2 Race Wins
- 2009 - Seat Leon Supercopa - 8 race wins
- 2008 - Seat Leon Supercopa - 11 race wins
- 2007- BTCC Honda Integra Sibsport Performance - independent Cup
- 2006- Euro Saloons- Super Touring Honda Accord- Graham Hathaway Engineering- 6 Race Wins 2 Second places.,
- 2005- Northern Sports & Saloons series - Peugeot 205 numerous Class wins
- 2004- Northern Sports & Saloons series - Peugeot 205
- 2003- Northern Sports & Saloons series - Ford Escort

== Racing record ==
=== Complete British Touring Car Championship results ===
(key) (Races in bold indicate pole position - 1 point awarded in first race) (Races in italics indicate fastest lap - 1 point awarded all races) (* signifies that driver lead race for at least one lap - 1 point awarded all races)

Year	Team	Car	1	2	3	4	5	6	7	8	9	10	11	12	13	14	15	16	17	18	19	20	21	22	23	24	25	26	27	28	29	30	DC	Pts
2007	Sibsport	Honda Integra Type-R	BRH; 1; 16	BRH; 2; 14	BRH; 3; 16	ROC; 1 Ret	ROC; 2 Ret	ROC; 3; 10	THR; 1; 18	THR; 2; 11	THR; 3; 16	CRO; 1; 12	CRO; 2 Ret	CRO; 3 DNS	OUL; 1; 12	OUL; 2 Ret	OUL; 3 DNS	DON; 1 Ret	DON; 2; 17	DON; 3 Ret	SNE; 1; 16	SNE; 2; 14	SNE; 3; 15	BRH; 1	BRH; 2	BRH; 3	KNO; 1	KNO; 2	KNO; 3	THR; 1	THR; 2	THR; 3	**25th**	**1**
