= Graham Hathaway =

British racing driver (born 1951)

- Nationality: (United Kingdom) British
- Born: 4 April 1951 (age 75) Chelmsford, Essex, England

British Touring Car Championship
- Years active: 1987–1990
- Teams: Terry Drury Racing; Soans Ford Main Dealer; Graham Hathaway Racing; Trakstar Motorsport
- Starts: 20
- Wins: 0 (1 in class)
- Poles: 0
- Fastest laps: 1
- Best finish: 19th in 1990

Graham Hathaway (born 4 April 1951 in Chelmsford, Essex) is a British retired auto racing driver. He is now running his own team Graham Hathaway Racing (GHR). His racing career has seen him compete in rallycross and saloon cars. In 1988, 1989 and 1990, he entered selected rounds of the British Touring Car Championship driving a Ford Sierra RS500.

== Graham Hathaway Racing ==
Robb Gravett won the BTCC privateers cup in 1997 for GHR with a Honda Accord. The team returned to the BTCC, when GHR ran a former Team Dynamics Honda Integra for Simon Blanckley under the Sibsport banner. More recently the team has entered cars in Historic Touring cars and 750 MC bike racing.

Guinness World Speed records achieved for Fastest Production Car 0-60 3.07sec, 0-100 7.06sec, 0-100-0 12.6secs, which stood up until 2006.

== Racing record ==
=== Complete British Touring Car Championship results ===
(key) (Races in bold indicate pole position) (Races in italics indicate fastest lap – 1 point awarded ?–1989 in class)

Year	Team	Car	Class	1	2	3	4	5	6	7	8	9	10	11	12	13	DC	Pts	Class
1987	Terry Drury Racing	Ford Escort RS Turbo	B	SIL	OUL	THR	THR	SIL	SIL	BRH	SNE	DON	OUL; DNS	DON	SIL ovr:7† cls:1†		NC	0	NC
1988	Soans Ford Main Dealer	Ford Sierra RS500	A	SIL; Ret	OUL ovr:13 cls:7	THR; DNS	DON ovr:13 cls:11	THR ovr:10 cls:8	SIL ovr:15 cls:12	SIL ovr:16 cls:11	BRH	SNE; Ret	BRH ovr:10 cls:8	BIR; C	DON ovr:8 cls:8	SIL ovr:11 cls:8	NC	0	NC
1989	Graham Hathaway Racing	Ford Sierra RS500	A	OUL ovr:9 cls:8	SIL	THR	DON; Ret	THR; DNS	SIL	SIL	BRH	SNE	BRH ovr:13 cls:10	BIR	DON; Ret	SIL	NC	0	NC
1990	Trakstar Motorsport	Ford Sierra RS500	A	OUL	DON; Ret‡												19th	26	8th
1990	Graham Hathaway Racing	Ford Sierra RS500	A			THR ovr:3 cls:3	SIL ovr:5 cls:5	OUL ovr:6 cls:6	SIL	BRH; Ret	SNE	BRH; DNS	BIR	DON	THR	SIL	19th	26	8th

† Guest driver - not eligible for points.

‡ Endurance driver – not eligible for points
