= Jim Pocklington =

British racing driver (born 1963)

- Nationality: (United Kingdom) British
- Born: 18 September 1963 (age 63) Romford, England

Previous series
- 2007: British Touring Car Championship

Jim Pocklington (born 18 September 1963 in Romford) is a British racing driver who formerly (2007) drove a BMW 320I in the British Touring Car Championship, which is Britain's most popular national motor racing series. He now lives in Suffolk with his wife, Jan. Currently he is taking part in the Classic Touring Cars Racing Club's Super Tourers series with his team JPDELTA MOTORSPORT in his former BTCC Vauxhall Cavalier chassis 011. Whilst it was the 11th car built by DCRS (hence number 011) it was the first Vauxhall Cavalier touring car built and has chassis number 1.

== Racing history ==
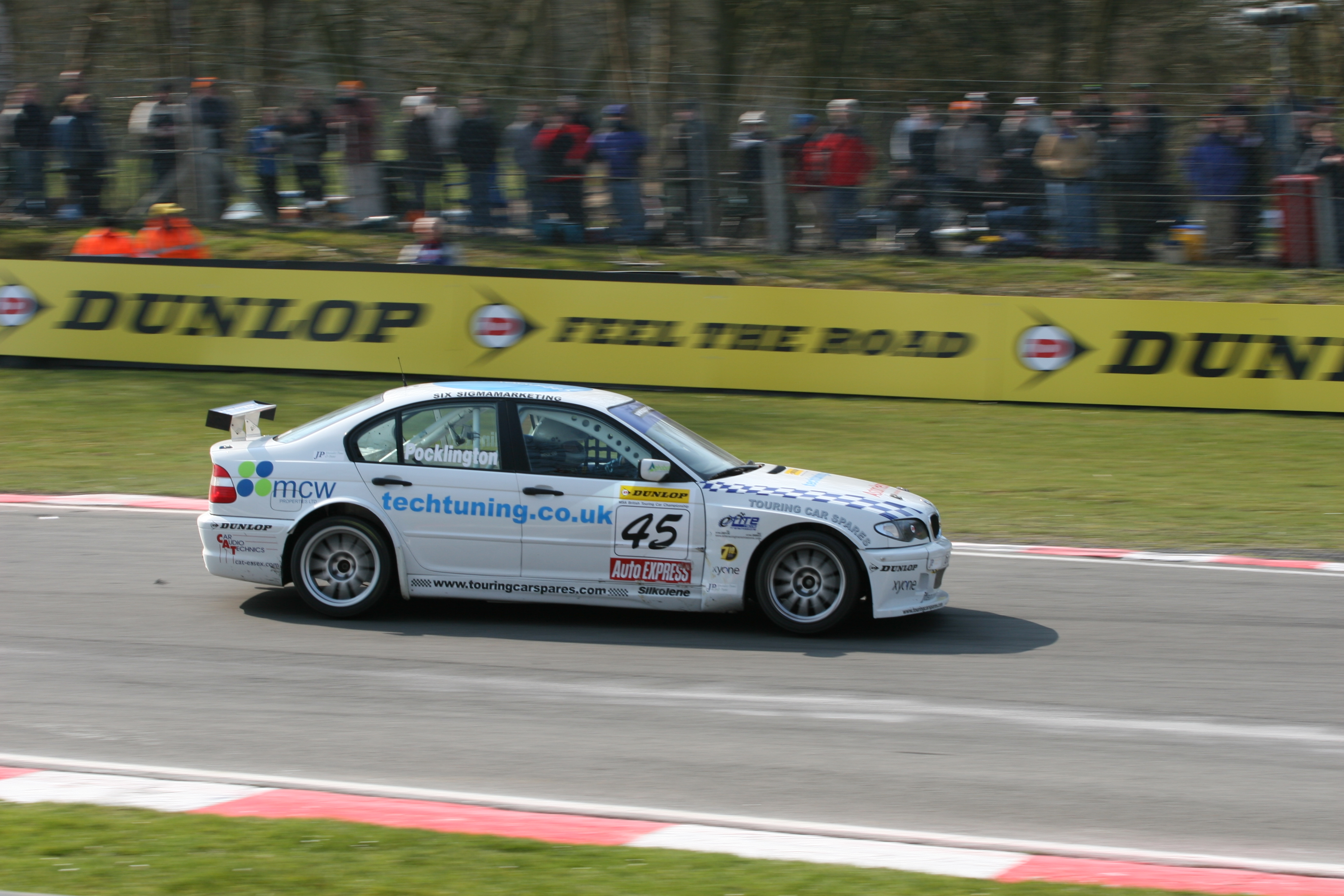
Pocklington driving the J-Team Motorsport-run BMW 320i at Brands Hatch during the 2007 British Touring Car Championship.

Pocklington previously drove in the Dutch Supercar Championship from 2004–2006. Before that he was in the formula Saloons UK where he drove a former BTCC Vauxhall Cavalier. In the 2007 BTCC season, he missed several rounds of the championship in trying to get the car competitive. His best finish to date was an eleventh place in the second race at Croft. Pocklington recently attended the 'Goodwood Festival of Speed' and was in first position for a considerable amount of time (best time around the track) to be ranked second in the final standings.

== Racing record ==
=== Complete British Touring Car Championship results ===
(key) (Races in bold indicate pole position - 1 point awarded in first race) (Races in italics indicate fastest lap - 1 point awarded all races) (* signifies that driver lead race for at least one lap - 1 point awarded all races)

Year	Team	Car	1	2	3	4	5	6	7	8	9	10	11	12	13	14	15	16	17	18	19	20	21	22	23	24	25	26	27	28	29	30	DC	Pts
2007	J-Team Motorsport	BMW 320i	BRH; 1; 18	BRH; 2; 18	BRH; 3 Ret	ROC; 1 Ret	ROC; 2 Ret	ROC; 3 Ret	THR; 1	THR; 2	THR; 3	CRO; 1; 16	CRO; 2; 11	CRO; 3; 14	OUL; 1; 18	OUL; 2; 17	OUL; 3 Ret	DON; 1	DON; 2	DON; 3	SNE; 1	SNE; 2	SNE; 3	BHI; 1	BHI; 2	BHI; 3	KNO; 1	KNO; 2	KNO; 3	THR; 1	THR; 2	THR; 3	**29th**	**0**
