= Team Dynamics =

British motor racing team

(United Kingdom) Team Dynamics Motorsport
- Founded: 1991
- Founder(s): Ray Bellm; Steve Neal
- Base: Pershore, Worcestershire, England
- Team principal(s): Matt Neal
- Current series: BTCC; Touring Car Trophy; Mini Challenge
- Current drivers: (United Kingdom) Gordon Shedden - BTCC
- Teams' Championships: 2005 BTCC; 2005 Ind. BTCC; 2006 BTCC; 2006 Ind. BTCC; 2010 BTCC; 2011 BTCC; 2012 BTCC; 2015 BTCC; 2019 BTCC
- Drivers' Championships: 1993 Ind. BTCC (Neal); 1995 Ind. BTCC (Neal); 1999 Ind. BTCC (Neal); 2000 Ind. BTCC (Neal); 2005 BTCC (Neal); 2005 Ind. BTCC (Neal); 2006 BTCC (Neal); 2006 Ind. BTCC (Neal); 2011 BTCC (Neal); 2012 BTCC (Shedden); 2015 BTCC (Shedden); 2016 BTCC (Shedden)

Team Dynamics Motorsport is a UK-based motor-racing team based in Droitwich, Worcestershire; best known for their successes in the British Touring Car Championship, including winning the Overall Drivers title in 2005, 2006 and 2011 with Matt Neal and 2012, 2015 and 2016 with Gordon Shedden. The team was founded by Steve Neal and, former driver of Vic Lee Motorsport, Ray Bellm when they acquired its assets in 1993. For the following season, Bellm, having bought a majority stake in the Silverstone-based motorsport equipment retailer, Grand Prix Racewear, also acquired a McLaren F1 GTR and went his own way.

As well as racing cars, the team sells its own range of wheels, race simulators and vehicle remaps.

The team operated as the Honda 'Factory' entry in the British Touring Car Championship operating under the 'Halfords Racing with Cataclean' name racing two Honda Civic NGTC Type Rs. In addition to the British Touring Car Championship, the team also raced two Minis in the Mini Challenge with Matt Neal's sons, William and Henry Neal, as the drivers.

In June 2016, it was announced that Rimstock (wheel manufacturing) had been sold to investment company Safanad.

== Super Touring years ==
=== Independent entry (1992–2000) ===
==== BMW M3 and 318is (1992–1993) ====
Entered as Rimstock Racing, competing in both a BMW M3 and a 318is, Matt Neal ran his BMW entry as an Independent during the Manufacturer dominated Super Touring period of the BTCC. In 1992, he managed to finish twice in the points, scoring five points for the team. 1993, saw the first success for the team when Neal won the TOCA Challenge for Privateers (Independent Driver's Championship), the team having acquired the assets of Vic Lee Motorsport at the end of the previous season. Originally, the team planned to prepare engines for BMW and created the team under the 'Engine Dynamics' name, but when BMW decided to do its engines in-house, the outfit rebranded to Team Dynamics.

==== Ford Mondeo (1995–1997) ====
After a one-year break, the team returned with Matt Neal racing a year-old Ford Mondeo. Despite this, Neal still won the 1995 Total Cup for Privateers and managed to score the team's best finish to date when they finished fourth at Snetterton. 1996 saw a two car line up for Neal and Robb Gravett. Before the switch to a private Nissan Team Dynamics had considered applying for the Ford works contract which explains a Paul Radisich test in the team's Mondeo.

==== Nissan Primera (1997–2000) ====
Team Dynamics started the 1997 season with their tried and tested Mondeo, however a mid season change to a Nissan Primera was needed after two poor seasons. The poor form continued through 1998 until the start of the 1999 British Touring Car Championship season when Neal once again won the Michelin Cup for Independents for the team. The team was also able to take the first ever outright race win for an independent team during the first round's second race at Donington Park. The team went on to score three further outright podium finishes to achieve their best championship position to date, finishing sixth overall. The team's newfound form continued into 2000 with another Independent's Championship for Neal with one race win and four podiums pushing the team to fourth in the Touring Teams Championship.

Their form turnaround began when using a borrowed Nissan from the factory team they narrowly lost the 1998 Bathurst 1000 in Australia. After a race-long duel with a TWR Volvo S40, Neal and Steven Richards lost by under two seconds to Rickard Rydell and Jim Richards.

== Modern years ==
=== British Rally Championship ===
Team Dynamics sponsored British Rally driver Jonny Milner, who won back to back titles in 2002 and 2003 at the wheel of a Dynamics prepared Toyota Corolla. For 2004, Milner switched to a Subaru Impreza again built by the West Midlands-based outfit.

=== Independent entry (2003–2009) ===
==== Vauxhall Astra (2003) ====
A brief spell away from the BTCC was ended when the team entered a Vauxhall Astra Coupé for Gareth Howell during the final four rounds of the 2003 season.

==== Honda Civic Type-R (2004) ====
They entered as Computeach Racing with Halfords in 2004 running two Honda Civic Type-Rs, purchased from the departing Honda works team, for Neal and Dan Eaves, achieving four race wins and several podium positions.

==== Honda Integra Type R (2005–2006) ====
For 2005, under the guise of Team Halfords, they developed a Honda Integra from its basic road-going form, winning the overall drivers title for Matt Neal, making him the first driver to win the overall title with an independent team. Eaves won 4 races for them, and Gareth Howell returned in a 3rd car towards the end of the year to take one win at Silverstone. The team also won both the Teams and Independent Teams championships.

Eaves was surprisingly not retained for the 2006 season, the team instead signed Gordon Shedden alongside Neal, who went on to retain his title. The team entered a 3rd Integra at the beginning of the season, although it did not appear until the seventh meeting of the year at Snetterton, once again driven by Gareth Howell. Team Dynamics successfully defended both the Teams and Independent Teams championships.

==== Honda Civic (eighth generation) (2007–2009) ====
In 2007, Matt Neal was again paired with Gordon Shedden. However, they were driving newly developed Honda Civics, required to meet the new Super 2000 regulations all teams must meet to be eligible for championship points. Entering as neither Manufacturer or Independent, the new car scored four wins and several podiums for both drivers, allowing Shedden and Neal to finish third and fourth respectively. The team was unable to defend its title, finishing third overall.

For the 2008 season, Neal left the team to drive for the Vauxhall works team, leaving Dynamics in search of a second driver. In November the team confirmed that Tom Chilton would partner Shedden for 2008. Again entering as neither Manufacturer or Independent, the new car scored four wins as it had the previous year. However Shedden was only able to finish seventh with Chilton three places behind him. The team again finished third overall.

Halfords withdrew their sponsorship in 2009. After one year with the team Chilton was dropped and replaced by veteran racer David Pinkney. After the opening rounds at Brands Hatch, James Thompson joined Team Dynamics, replacing Shedden. Thompson enjoyed three victories with the team but could not complete the season because of prior commitments in the WTCC and Danish Touring Car Championship. His final races with the team were at Knockhill in August 2009. Having been invited by Team Dynamics to run the Civic at the 2009 Goodwood Festival of Speed and completing a testing session at Rockingham, ex-British Grand Prix winner Johnny Herbert took Thompson's seat for the final rounds of the 2009 season. A mixed season saw the team only manage fifth in the teams championship after only three wins.

=== Constructor entry (2010–present) ===
==== Honda Civic (eighth generation) (2010–2011) ====
For 2010, Team Dynamics were supported by Honda UK and ran under the Honda Racing Team banner, with Matt Neal and Gordon Shedden returning as drivers. A season long battle with Silverline Chevrolet driver Jason Plato saw Dynamics' two drivers finish runners up, with Neal second and Shedden third. However, the team was able to win both the Manufacturers/Constructors and Teams championships, after scoring ten wins which was more than any other team.

Their dominance continued into 2011, as the team fitted its Super 2000 Civic with a NGTC 2.0 litre turbocharged engine. This combination allowed the team's drivers to finish first and second in the drivers championship with 13 wins between them. The team also successfully defended both the Manufacturers/Constructors and Teams championships, giving them a clean sheet over all the silverware.

==== Honda Civic (ninth generation) (2012–2017) ====
2012 saw the team move in a new direction, being the first manufacturer team to enter a car built fully to the Next Generation Touring Car specification. Neal and Shedden would again partner each other in the newly named Honda Yuasa Racing Team after a sponsorship deal with Yuasa. After the first four rounds of the season, Shedden led the team in second place with Neal right behind him. The NGTC Civic, was the first NGTC car to win a BTCC race when it took the race two win at Brands Hatch. At the end of the season the team took all titles they were eligible for, with Shedden winning the drivers' championship for the first time, the team winning the team's championship for the third time in a row and Honda winning the manufacturers' title.

The team returned for the 2013 British Touring Car Championship season and retained Shedden and Neal as their drivers.

==== Honda Civic NGTC Type R (2017-2023) ====
For the 2021 season, Team Dynamics was represented again by Gordon Shedden, accompanied by Jack Sears Trophy winner Daniel Rowbottom. Shedden finished sixth and Rowbottom finished ninth in the Drivers' Championship. Competing as "Halfords Racing with Cataclean", Team Dynamics finished third in the Teams' Championship.

Shedden and Rowbottom re-united again for the 2022 season, finishing seventh and twelfth respectively in the Drivers' Championship. Halfords Racing with Cataclean ranked fourth in the Teams' Championship.

On 5 April 2023 Team Dynamics announced that they would be taking a hiatus from BTCC during the 2023 season owing to difficulties in securing commercial agreements with sponsors. They are to continue supporting One Motorsport with aspects of their operation.

=== EXCELR8 Hyundai partnership (2024-) ===
Announced on 9 February 2024, Team Dynamics will enter a new partnership with EXCELR8. As part of the agreement, EXCELR8’s Porsche Carrera Cup and BTCC programme will now be run from the Team Dynamics base in Droitwich. Several Team Dynamics personnel, including title-winning engineer Barry Ploughman, will join the Hyundai programme.

== Gallery ==
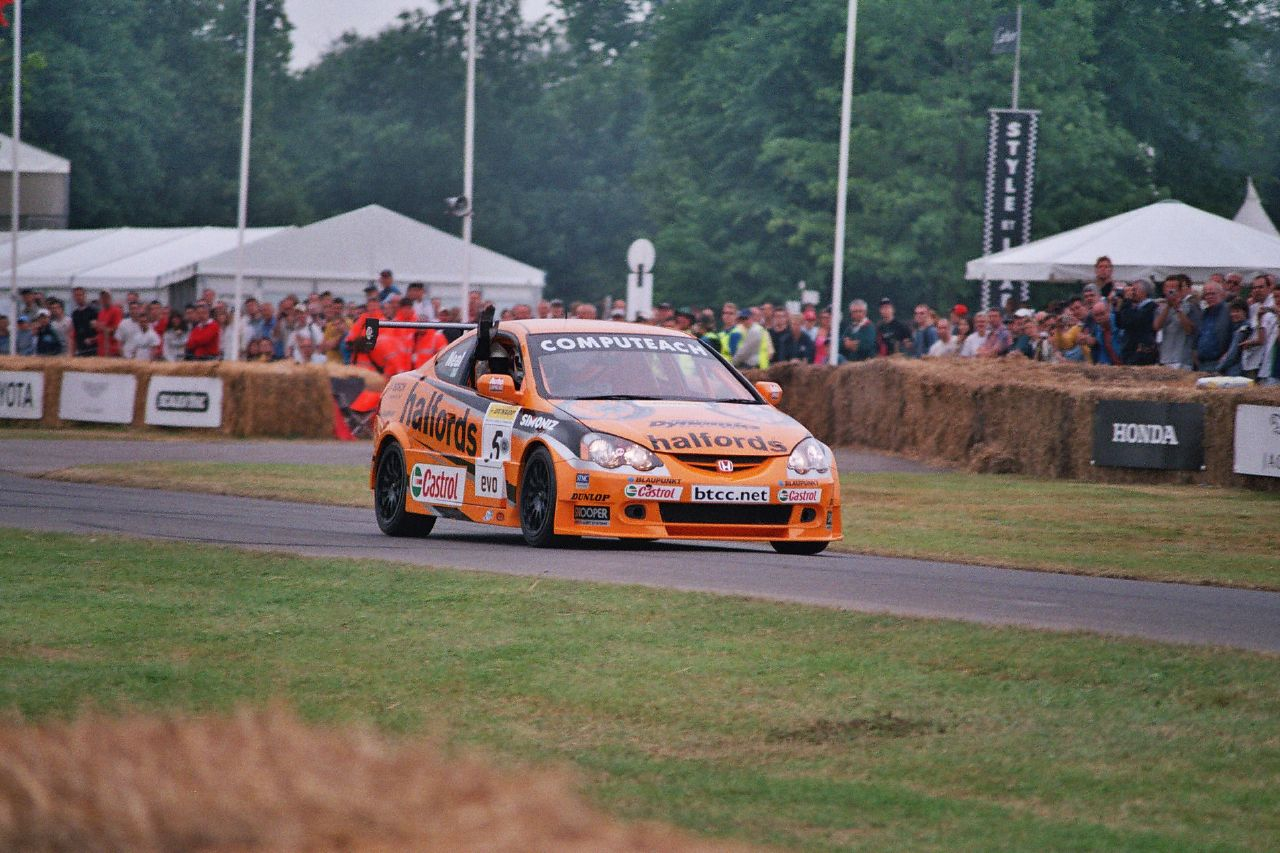
Matt Neal demonstrates a Team Dynamics Honda Integra at the 2006 Goodwood Festival of Speed

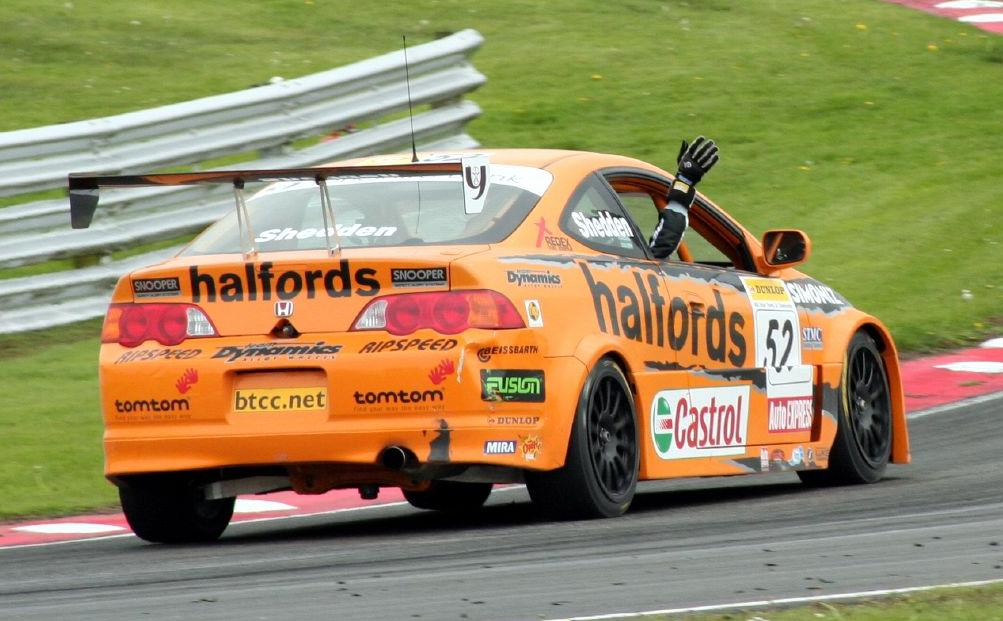
Shedden celebrates his first BTCC win at Oulton Park in 2006

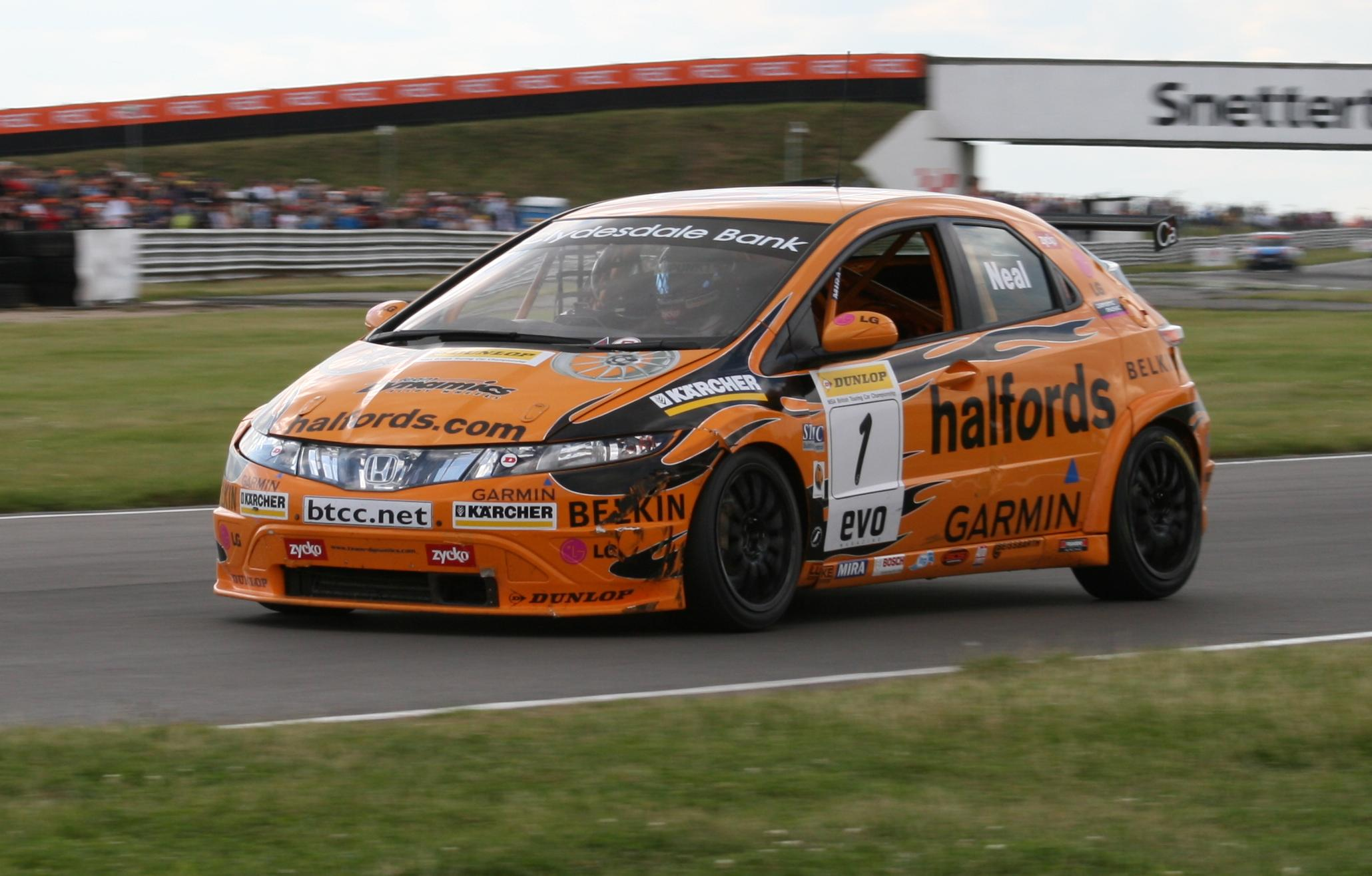
Matt Neal's Honda Civic at Snetterton in the 2007 BTCC season

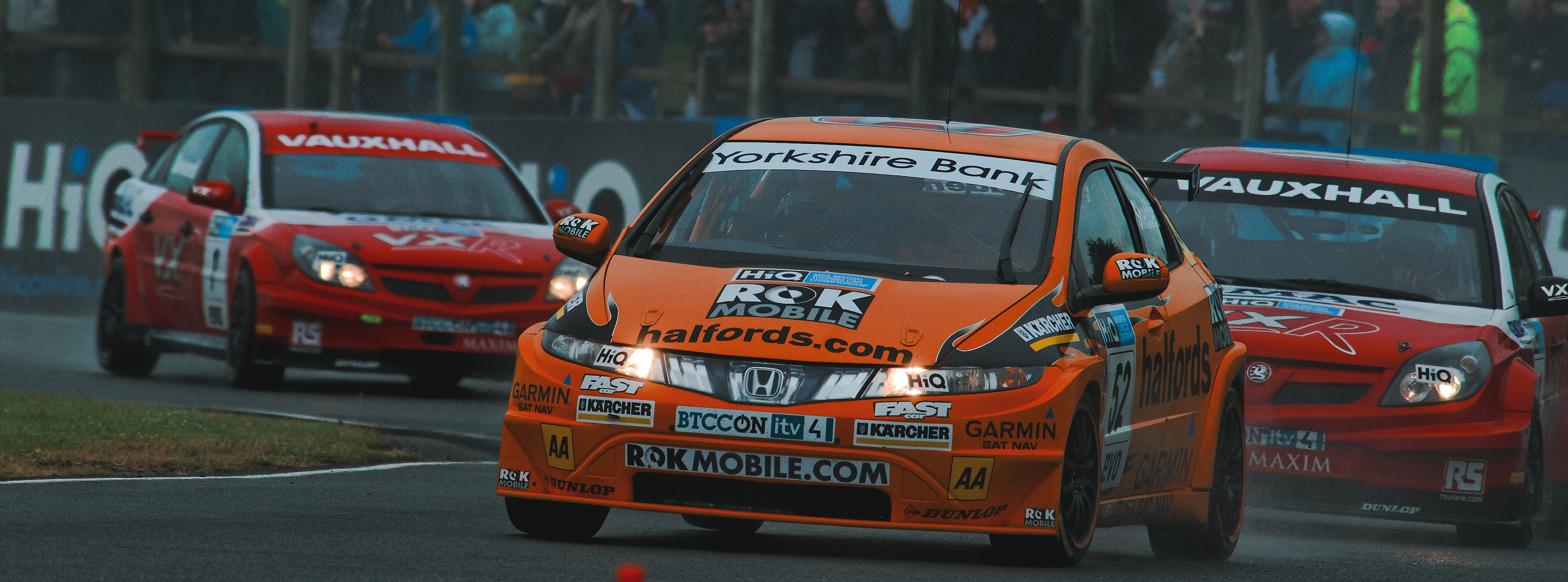
Shedden's Civic leads two of the VX Racing Vauxhalls at the Croft round of the 2008 British Touring Car Championship season

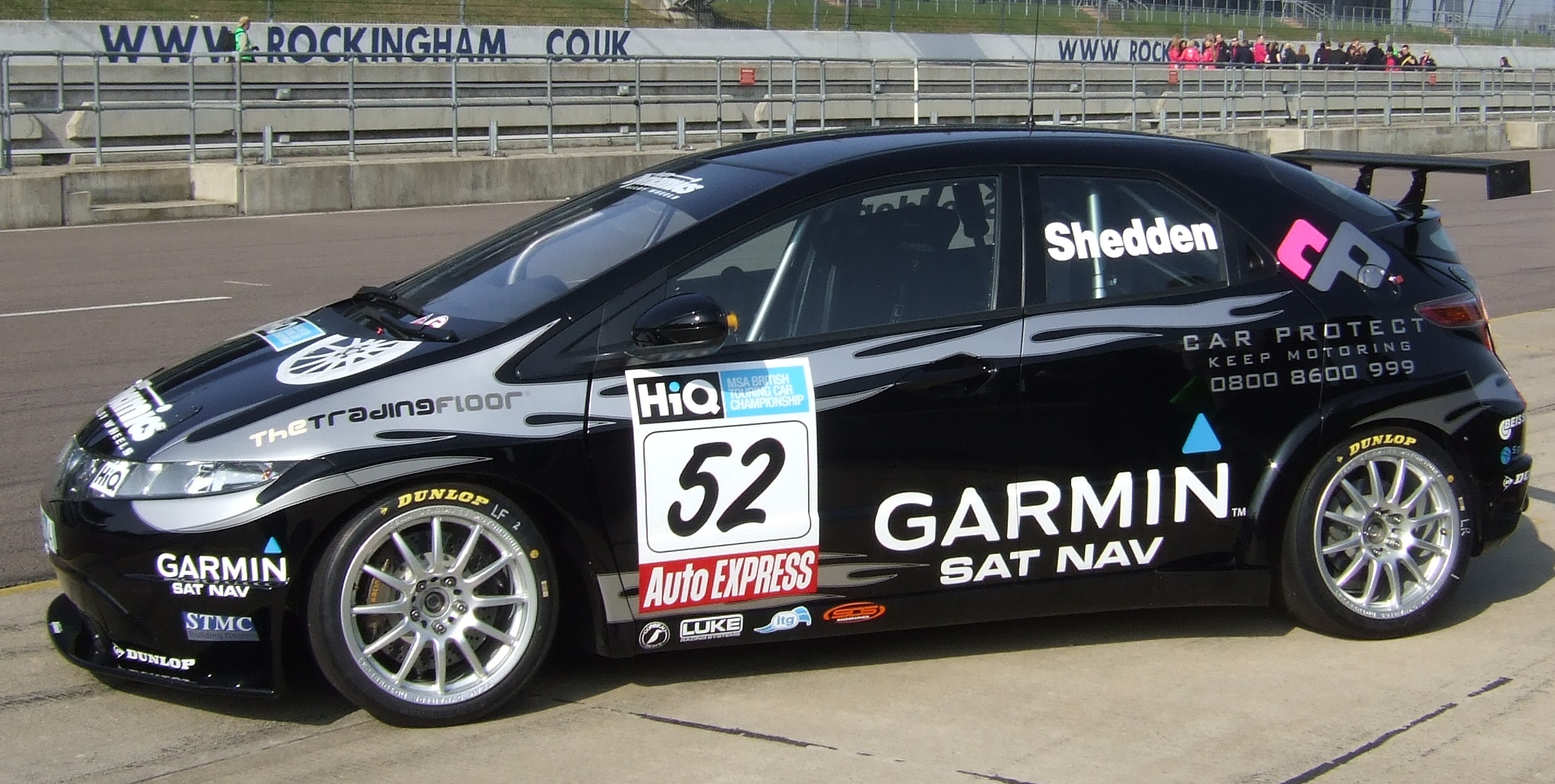
Gordon Shedden's Civic at the BTCC Media Day at Rockingham in March 2009

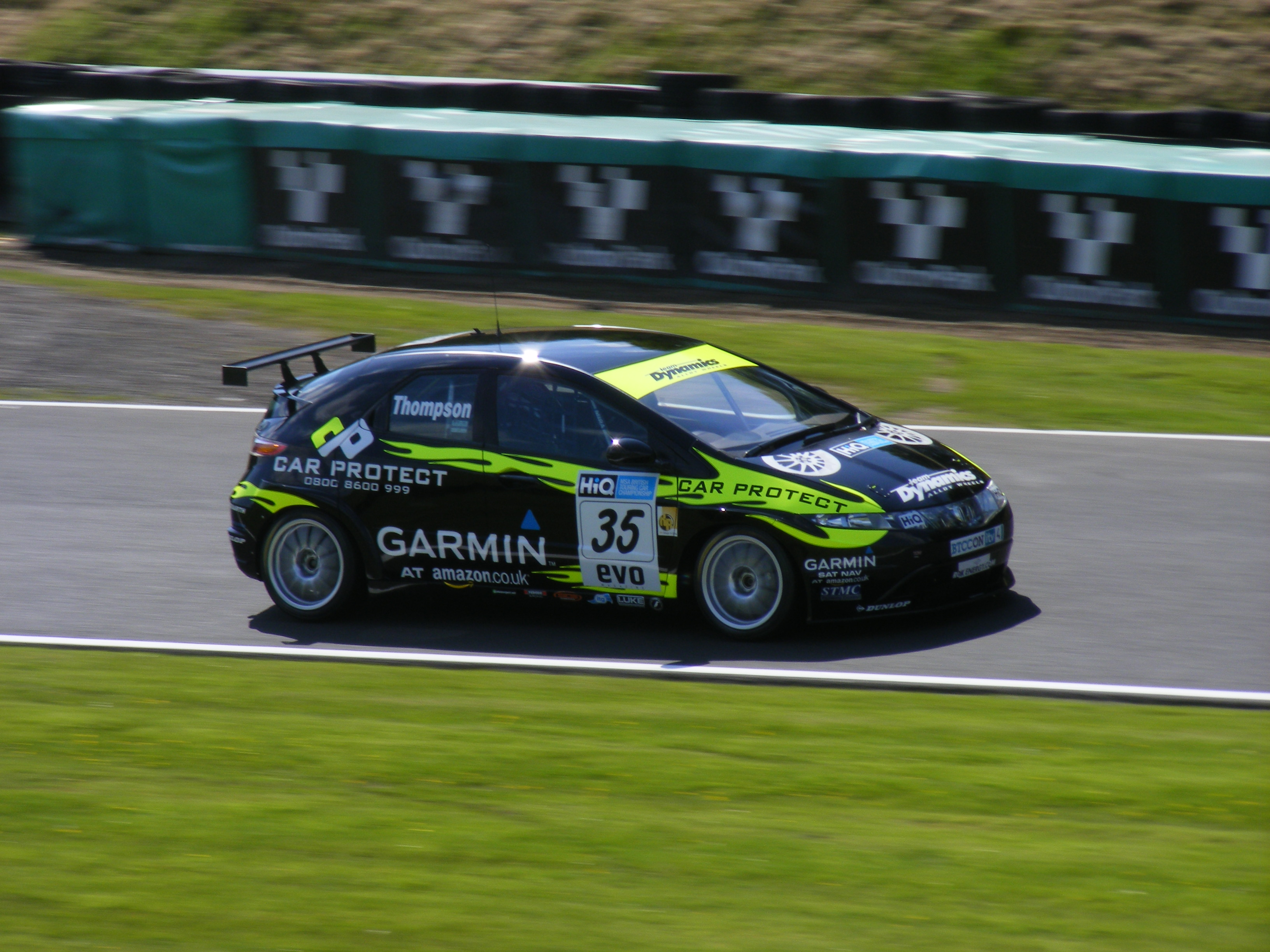
James Thompson's Honda Civic at Oulton Park during the 2009 BTCC season

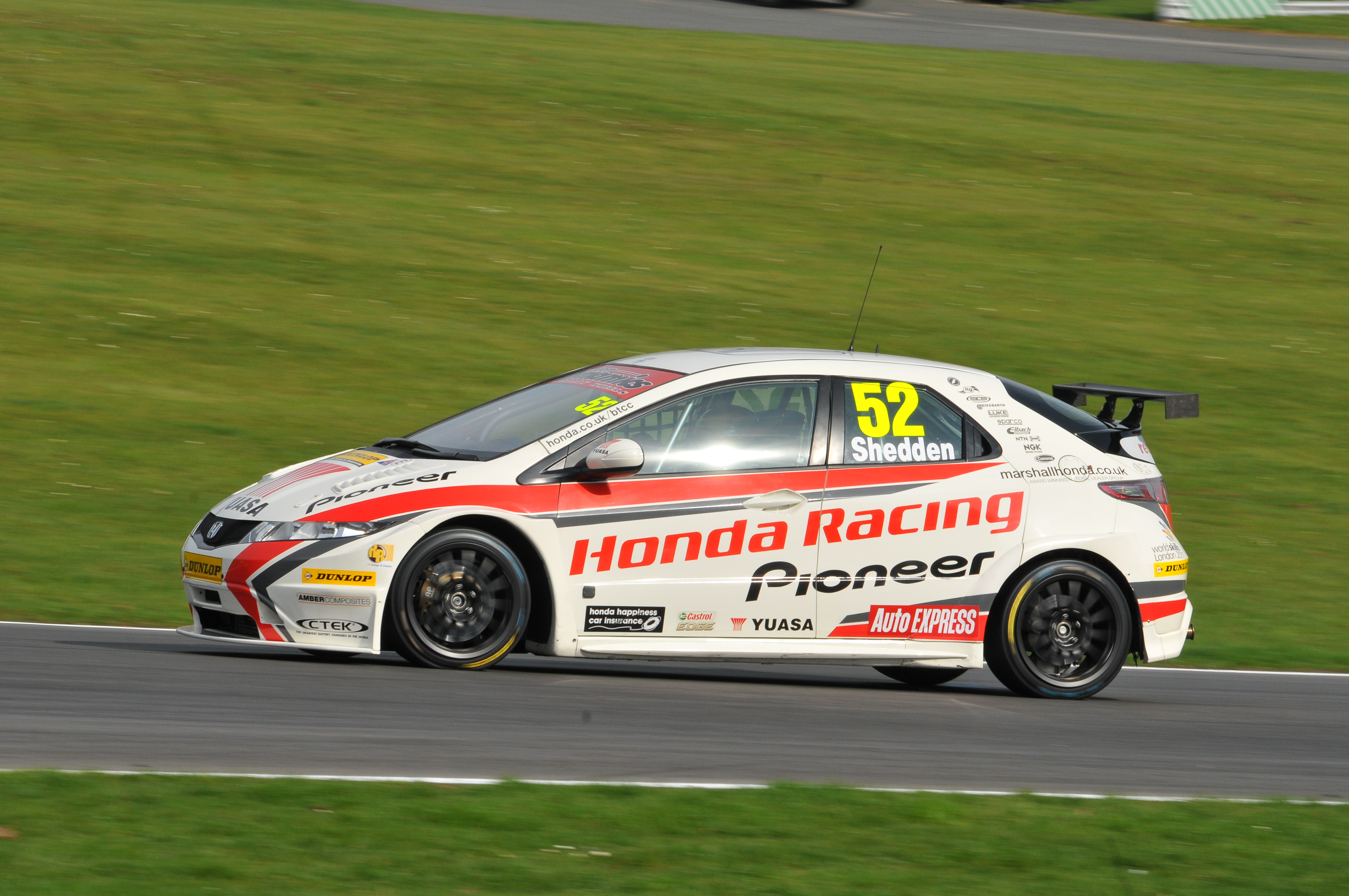
Shedden driving for Honda Racing at Brands Hatch in the 2011 BTCC season

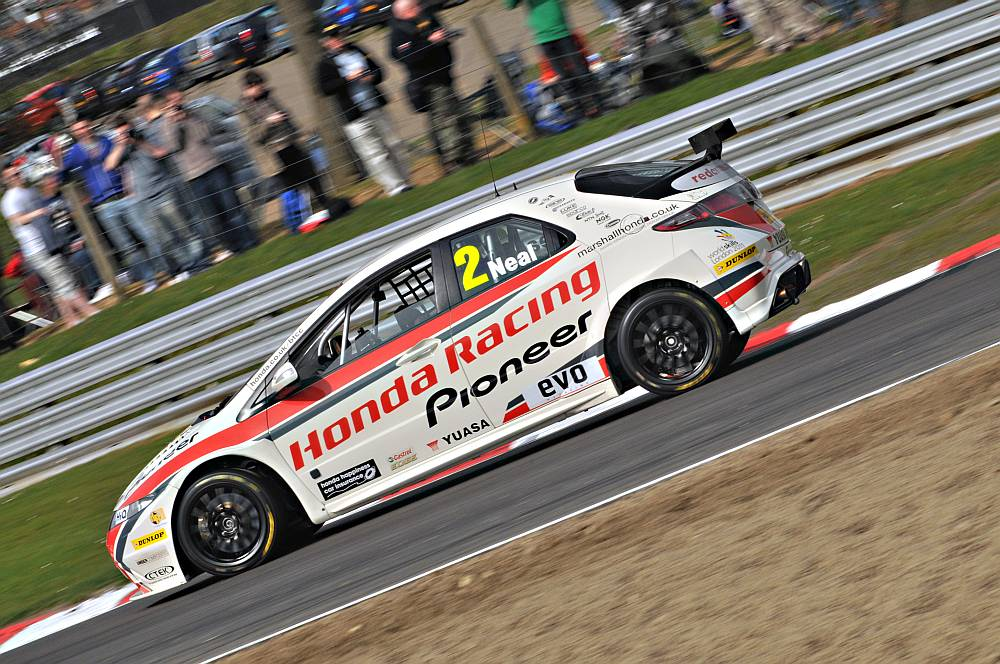
Neal driving the championship winning Civic at Brands Hatch in the 2011 BTCC season

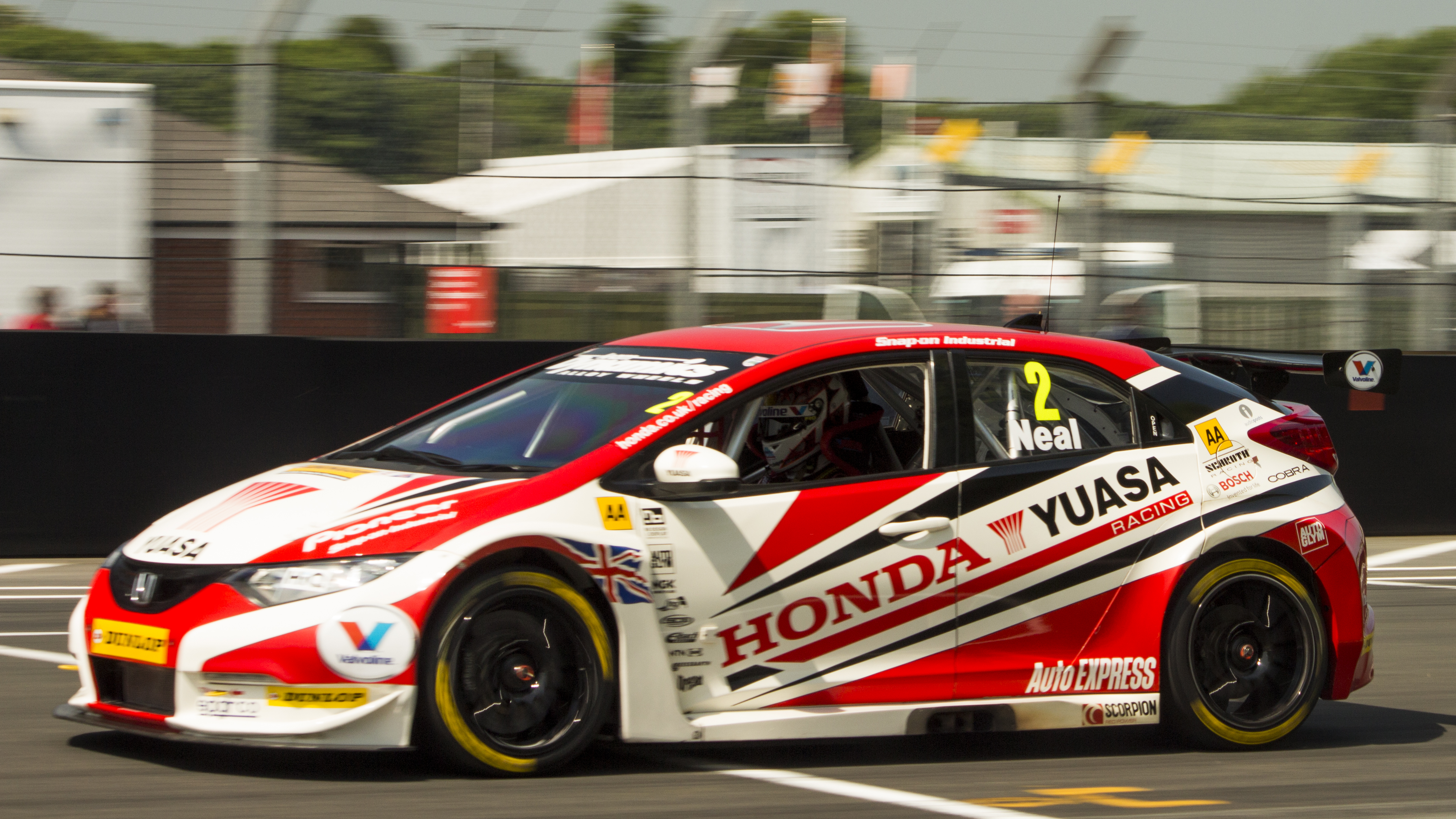
Neal's Civic at Oulton Park in the 2013 BTCC season

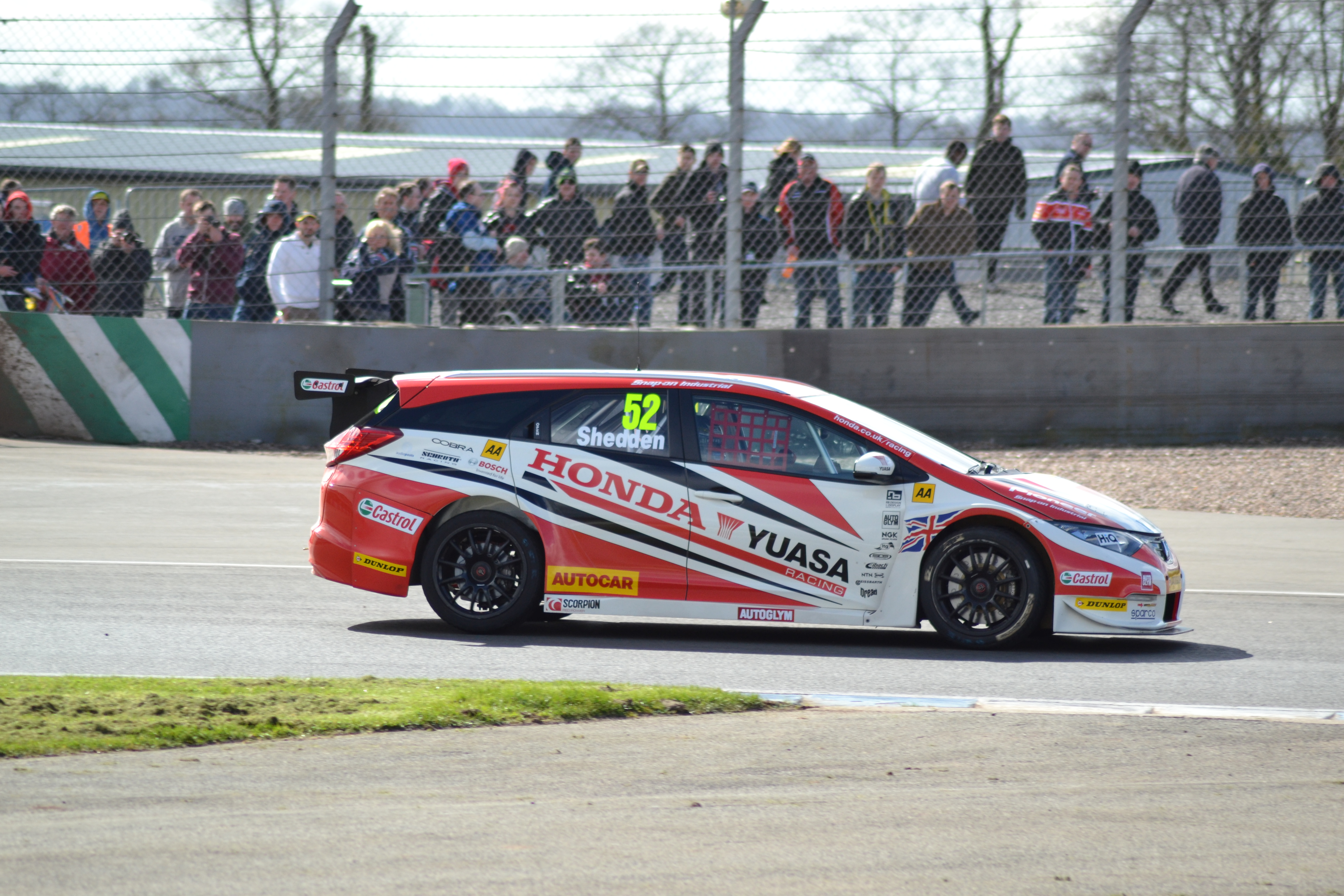
Shedden's Honda Civic Tourer at Donington Park in the 2014 BTCC season

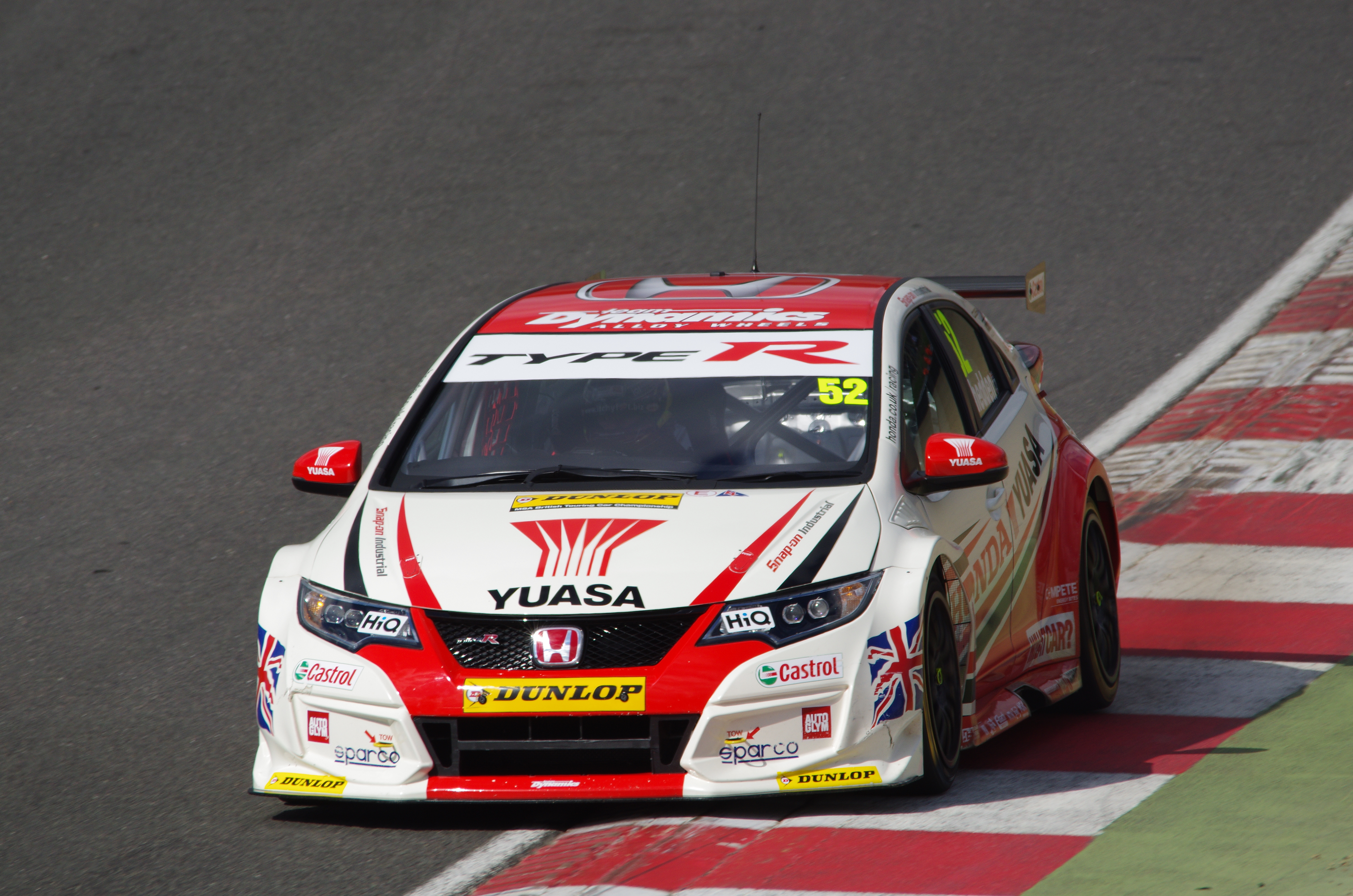
Shedden's Honda Civic Type R (FK2) at Brands Hatch in the 2015 BTCC season

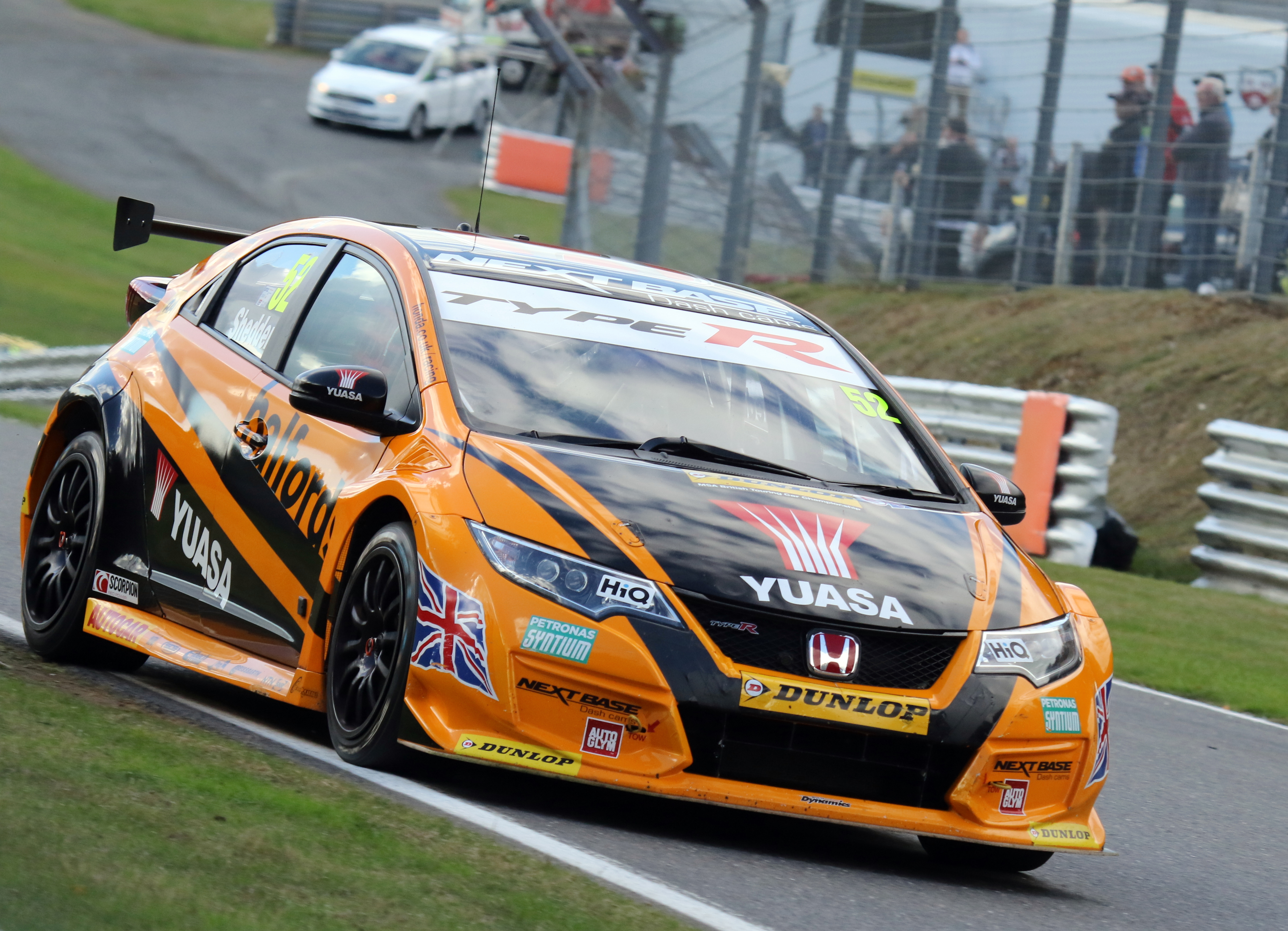
Shedden's Civic Type R brings back the Halfords colours at Brands Hatch in the 2016 BTCC season

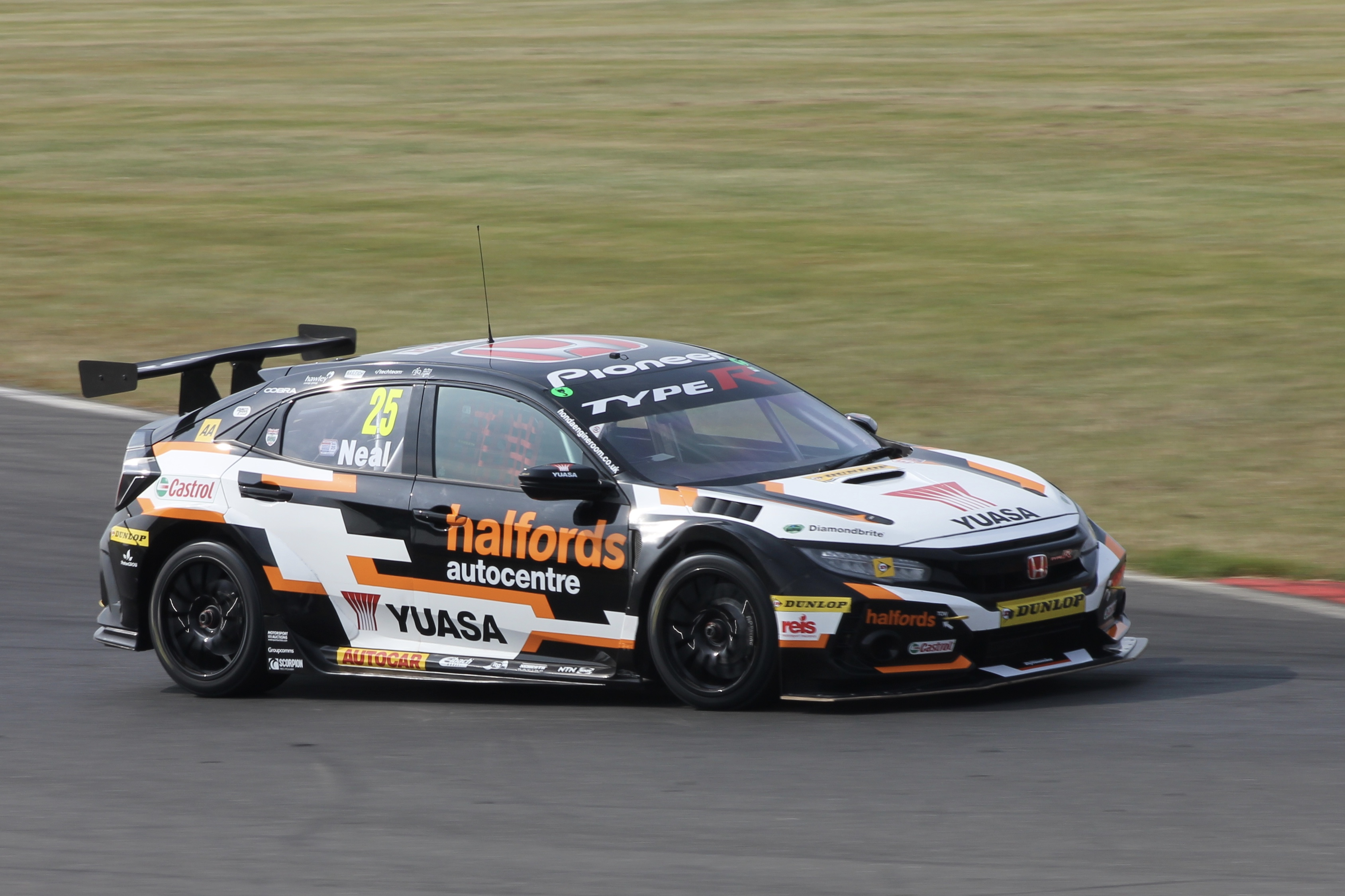
Neal's Honda Civic Type R (FK8) at Snetterton in the 2019 BTCC season
