= Quest Racing =

British auto racing team

Quest Racing is a UK auto racing team headed by Mike Thompson, the squad having been rebranded from its former guise as GA Motorsports when Thompson bought the controlling stake from original founder Gary Ayles. In mid-2006 the team began running an Alfa Romeo 156 for Irishman Eoin Murray in the British Touring Car Championship, continuing for 2007.
