= Carl Boardley =

British racing driver (born 1975)

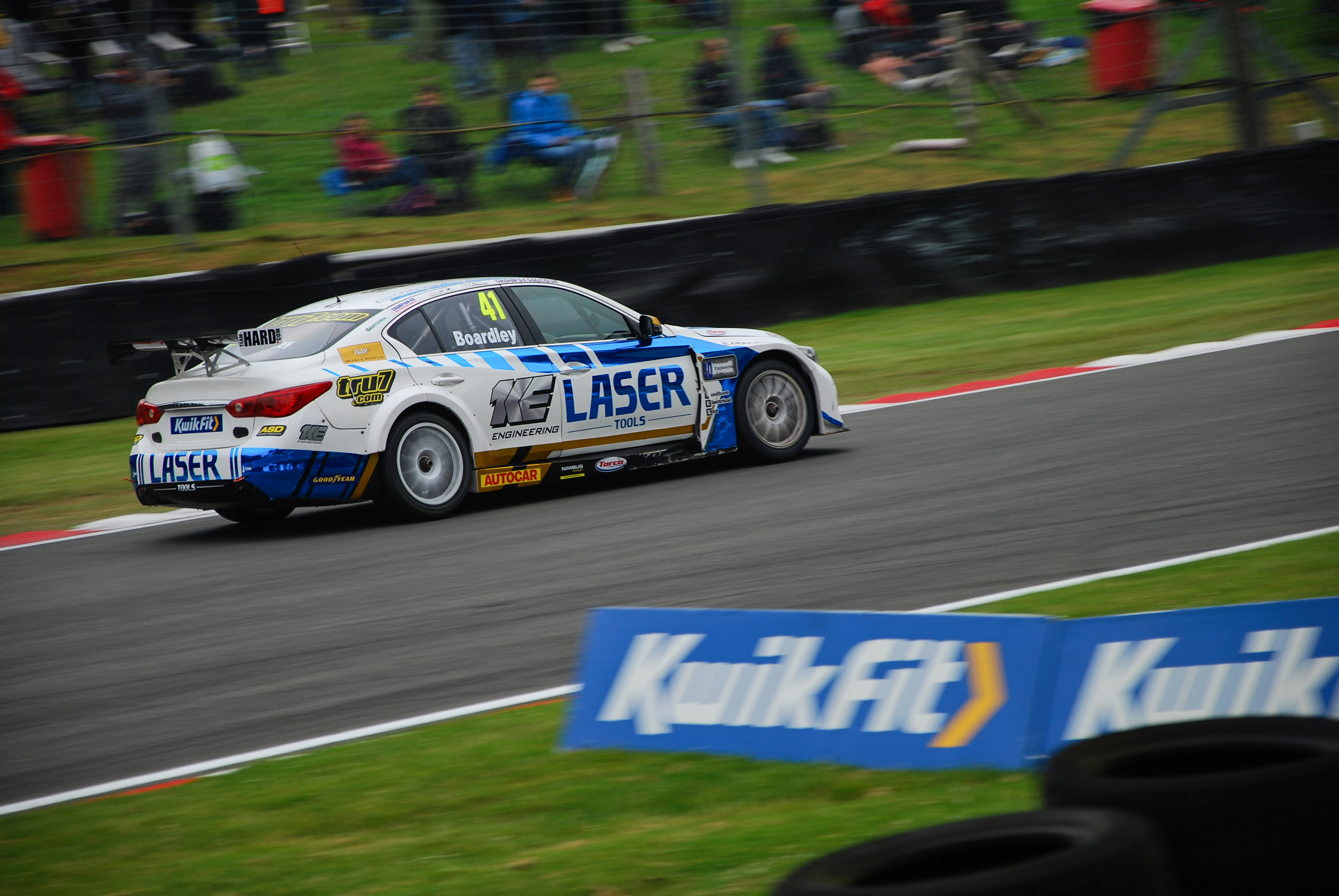
- Nationality: British
- Born: Carl Richard Boardley; 7 December 1975 (age 50)
- Relatives: Stuart Boardley (brother)

British Touring Car Championship career
- Debut season: 2018
- Current team: Autobrite Direct with JourneyHero
- Car number: 41
- Former teams: Laser Tools Racing
- Starts: 91
- Wins: 0
- Podiums: 0
- Poles: 0
- Best finish: 21st in 2020

Previous series
- 2013–2018: Ginetta GT4 Supercup; Hot Rods (oval racing)

Championship titles
- 2023-2024 2006, 2007 2008, 2009: TCR UK; Hot Rods (oval racing)

Carl Richard Boardley (born 7 December 1975) is a British racing driver and four time National Hot Rods (oval racing) World Champion, currently holding the records for most wins in a row.

On 5 July 2009, Boardley won the National Hot Rod World Championship for his fourth World title in a row.

Boardley's younger brother Stuart is a former professional footballer.

== Racing career ==
=== 2013 - Ginetta GT Supercup ===
In 2013, Boardley contested the entire season of the Ginetta GT Supercup, with a Ginetta G55 entered under the banner of his own CBM Motorsport team. Boardley finished the season in ninth place with 316 points. His highest place finish was third place at Thruxton.

=== 2014 - Ginetta GT4 Supercup ===
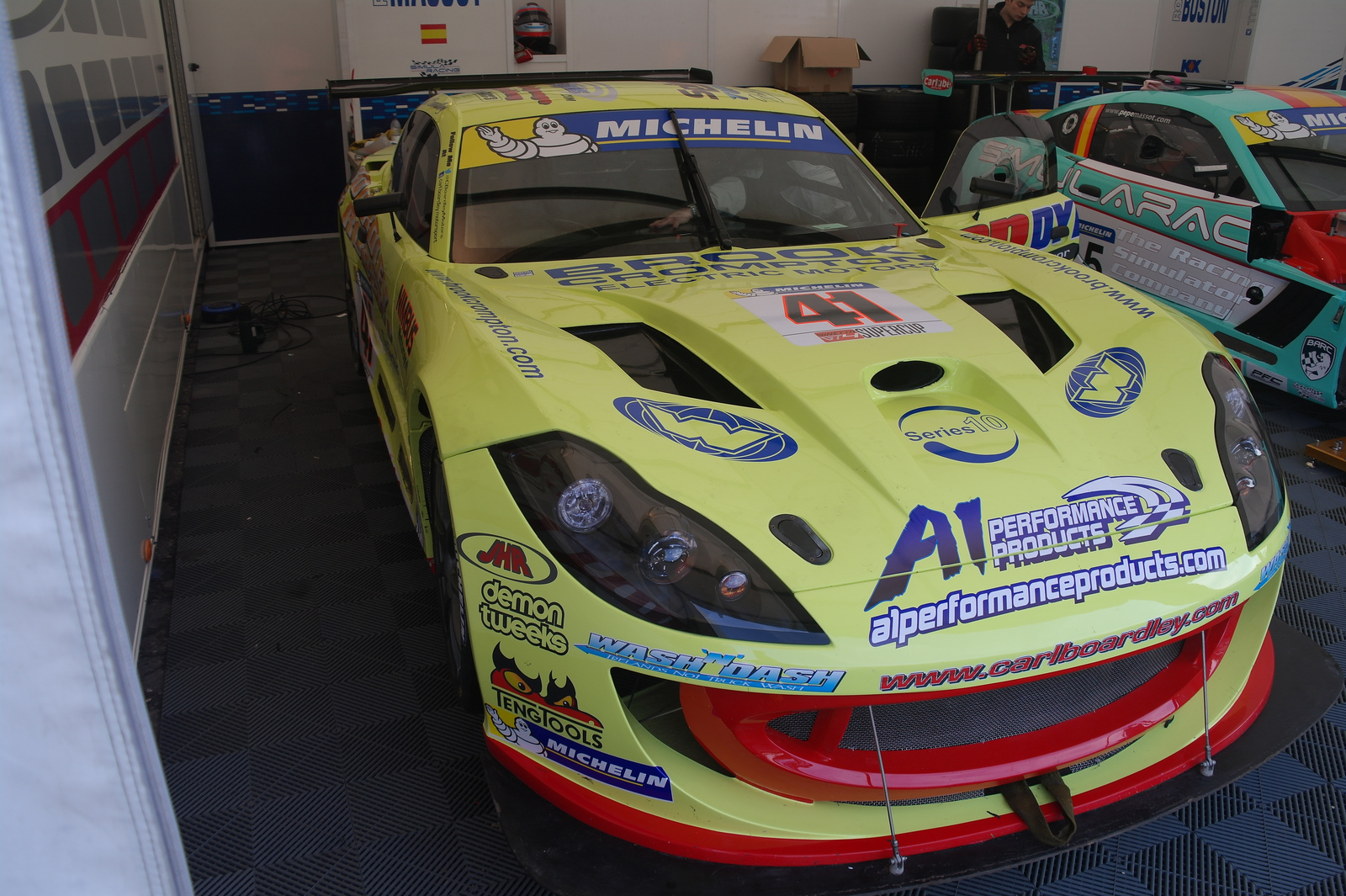
Carl Boardley's Ginetta G55 car pictured at Brands Hatch (Kent)

For 2014, Boardley is being entered by JHR Developments, the winning team of 2013 champion and now BTCC driver Tom Ingram.

== Racing record ==
=== Career summary ===
Season	Series	Team	Races	Wins	Poles	F/Laps	Podiums	Points	Position
2013	Ginetta GT Supercup	CBM Motorsport	27	0	0	0	1	316	9th
2014	Ginetta GT4 Supercup	CBM Motorsport	10	0	0	1	0	90	15th
2015	Ginetta GT4 Supercup	CBM Motorsport	5	0	0	0	1	83	12th
2016	Ginetta GT4 Supercup	CBM Motorsport	23	2	1	4	8	477	**3rd**
2017	Ginetta GT4 Supercup	Xentek Motorsport	22	1	1	2	5	352	8th
2018	Ginetta GT4 Supercup	Team HARD	23	6	0	4	14	620	**2nd**
2018	British Touring Car Championship	Team HARD. with Trade Price Cars	3	0	0	0	0	0	NC
2019	British Touring Car Championship	RCIB Insurance with Fox Transport	30	0	0	0	0	5	29th
2020	British Touring Car Championship	HUB Financial Solutions with Team HARD.	26	0	0	0	0	18	21st
2021	British Touring Car Championship	Laser Tools Racing	30	0	0	0	0	29	22nd
2022	British Touring Car Championship	UptonSteel with Euro Car Parts Racing	0	0	0	0	0	0	NC
2022	British Touring Car Championship	Autobrite Direct with JourneyHero	2	0	0	0	0	0	NC
2023	TCR UK Touring Car Championship	Zest Racecar Engineering	2	0	0	0	0	403	**1st**
2023	TCR UK Touring Car Championship	CBM with Hart GT	13	4	1	0	5	403	**1st**
2024	TCR UK Touring Car Championship	CBM with Hart GT	20	5	1	5	14	611	**1st**
2026	TCR UK Touring Car Championship	DTR	10	0	0	0	3	144	6th*
2026	TCR Europe Touring Car Series	ALM Motorsport	4	0	0	0	0	20	23rd

^{*} Season still in progress.

=== Complete British Touring Car Championship results ===
(key) (Races in bold indicate pole position – 1 point awarded in first race; races in italics indicate fastest lap – 1 point awarded all races; * signifies that driver lead race for at least one lap – 1 point awarded all races)

Year	Team	Car	1	2	3	4	5	6	7	8	9	10	11	12	13	14	15	16	17	18	19	20	21	22	23	24	25	26	27	28	29	30	Pos	Points
2018	Team HARD. with Trade Price Cars	Volkswagen CC	BRH; 1	BRH; 2	BRH; 3	DON; 1	DON; 2	DON; 3	THR; 1	THR; 2	THR; 3	OUL; 1	OUL; 2	OUL; 3	CRO; 1	CRO; 2	CRO; 3	SNE; 1	SNE; 2	SNE; 3	ROC; 1	ROC; 2	ROC; 3	KNO; 1 DSQ	KNO; 2 DSQ	KNO; 3 DSQ	SIL; 1	SIL; 2	SIL; 3	BRH; 1	BRH; 2	BRH; 3	NC	0
2019	RCIB Insurance with Fox Transport	Volkswagen CC	BRH; 1 NC	BRH; 2; 25	BRH; 3 Ret	DON; 1; 20	DON; 2; 15	DON; 3 Ret	THR; 1; 29	THR; 2; 23	THR; 3 Ret	CRO; 1; 19	CRO; 2; 22	CRO; 3; 15	OUL; 1; 20	OUL; 2; 17	OUL; 3; 15	SNE; 1; 21	SNE; 2 Ret	SNE; 3 Ret	THR; 1; 30	THR; 2 Ret	THR; 3 Ret	KNO; 1; 16	KNO; 2; 20	KNO; 3; 19	SIL; 1; 23	SIL; 2 Ret	SIL; 3 Ret	BRH; 1; 17	BRH; 2; 14	BRH; 3; 19	29th	5
2020	HUB Financial Solutions with Team HARD.	BMW 125i M Sport	DON; 1; 19	DON; 2; 15	DON; 3; 14	BRH; 1; 16	BRH; 2; 15	BRH; 3; 16	OUL; 1 Ret	OUL; 2; 25	OUL; 3; 14	KNO; 1; 15	KNO; 2; 12	KNO; 3; 17	THR; 1 Ret	THR; 2; 19	THR; 3 Ret	SIL; 1; 12	SIL; 2; 23	SIL; 3; 14	CRO; 1; 20	CRO; 2 DNS	CRO; 3; 22	SNE; 1; 15	SNE; 2; 24	SNE; 3; 18	BRH; 1; 24	BRH; 2 Ret	BRH; 3; 23				21st	18
2021	Laser Tools Racing	Infiniti Q50	THR; 1; 12	THR; 2; 17	THR; 3 Ret	SNE; 1; 20	SNE; 2; 17	SNE; 3 Ret	BRH; 1; 16	BRH; 2; 20	BRH; 3; 19	OUL; 1; 11	OUL; 2; 11	OUL; 3 Ret	KNO; 1; 18	KNO; 2; 10	KNO; 3; 11	THR; 1; 24	THR; 2; 21	THR; 3 Ret	CRO; 1; 15	CRO; 2; 23	CRO; 3; 15	SIL; 1; 15	SIL; 2 Ret	SIL; 3; 19	DON; 1; 27	DON; 2; 23	DON; 3; 17	BRH; 1; 22	BRH; 2; 15	BRH; 3 Ret	22nd	29
2022	UptonSteel with Euro Car Parts Racing	Infiniti Q50	DON; 1	DON; 2	DON; 3	BRH; 1	BRH; 2	BRH; 3	THR; 1	THR; 2	THR; 3	OUL; 1	OUL; 2	OUL; 3	CRO; 1 WD	CRO; 2 WD	CRO; 3 WD	KNO; 1	KNO; 2	KNO; 3	SNE; 1	SNE; 2	SNE; 3	THR; 1	THR; 2	THR; 3	SIL; 1	SIL; 2	SIL; 3				NC	0
2022	Autobrite Direct with JourneyHero	CUPRA León																												BRH; 1 Ret	BRH; 2 DNS	BRH; 3 Ret	NC	0

=== Complete TCR UK Touring Car Championship results ===
(key) (Races in bold indicate pole position) (Races in italics indicate fastest lap)

Year	Team	Car	1	2	3	4	5	6	7	8	9	10	11	12	13	14	15	16	17	18	19	20	Pos	Points
2023	Zest Racecar Engineering	Cupra León Competición TCR	SNE; 1; 6	SNE; 2; 5																			1st	403
2023	CBM with Hart GT	Cupra León Competición TCR			CRO; 1; 2^{2}	CRO; 2; 5	OUL; 1; 10	OUL; 2; 1	**KNO**; **1**; 1^{1}	KNO; 2; 4	**KNO**; **3**; 1^{1}	SIL; 1; 1^{4}	SIL; 2; 7	DON; 1; 4	DON; 2; 10	BHI; 1; 4^{5}	BHI; 2; 5						1st	403
2024	CBM with Hart GT	Cupra León Competición TCR	BRH; 1; 2^{3}	BRH; 2; 5	BRH; 3; 2	SNE; 1; 2^{4}	SNE; 2; 3	SNE; 3; 4	**OUL**; **1**; 1^{1}	OUL; 2; 2	CRO; 1; 3^{3}	CRO; 2; 1	CRO; 3; 3	SIL; 1; 1^{2}	SIL; 2; 3	SIL; 3; 1	THR; 1; 3^{3}	THR; 2; 1	THR; 3; 10	SIL; 1; 4^{6}	SIL; 2; 4	SIL; 3; 4	1st	611
2026	DTR	Honda Civic Type R TCR (FL5)	BRH; 1 Ret^{5}	BRH; 2 Ret	BRH; 3; 3	CRO; 1; 4	CRO; 2; 3	SNE; 1; 5^{5}	SNE; 2; 2	DON; 1; 5^{5}	DON; 2 Ret	DON; 3; 4	DON; 1	DON; 2	OUL; 1	OUL; 2	BRH; 1	BRH; 2	BRH; 3				6th*	144*

^{*} Season still in progress.

=== Complete TCR Europe Touring Car Series results ===
(key) (Races in bold indicate pole position) (Races in italics indicate fastest lap)

Year	Team	Car	1	2	3	4	5	6	7	8	9	10	11	12	DC	Points
2026	ALM Motorsport	Honda Civic Type R TCR (FL5)	MUG; 1	MUG; 2	SPA; 1	SPA; 2	LEC; 1	LEC; 2	HUN; 1	HUN; 2	MNZ; 1; 8	MNZ; 2; 10	CAT; 1 Ret	CAT; 2 Ret	23rd	20
