= 2014 Ginetta GT4 Supercup =

The 2014 Michelin Ginetta GT4 Supercup was a multi-event, one make GT motor racing championship held across England and Scotland. The championship featured a mix of professional motor racing teams and privately funded drivers, competing in a Ginetta G55 or Ginetta G50 that conformed to the technical regulations for the championship. It formed part of the extensive program of support categories built up around the BTCC centrepiece. It was the fourth Ginetta GT4 Supercup, having rebranded from the Ginetta G50 Cup, which ran between 2008 and 2010. The season commenced on 30 March at Brands Hatch – on the circuit's Indy configuration – and concluded on 12 October at the same venue, utilising the Grand Prix circuit, after twenty-seven races held at ten meetings, all in support of the 2014 British Touring Car Championship season.

After a season in single-seaters, competing in the BRDC Formula 4 Championship in 2013, HHC Motorsport driver Charlie Robertson became champion, taking a season-high eight victories – including a weekend sweep at Oulton Park – during the campaign. He took a total of 20 podium finishes from the season's 27 races, and ultimately won the championship by 83 points after dropped scores were implemented. Dropped scores affected the season's runner-up; Douglas Motorsport's Andrew Watson finished second on gross points, but unlike his rivals David Pittard (SV Racing with KX) and Carl Breeze of United Autosports, he had to drop 23 points from his overall tally. Thus, Watson fell to fourth, as Pittard and Breeze finished second and third respectively. Pittard took five wins during the season, including a weekend sweep at Silverstone, Watson also won five races, while Breeze won four races at Croft and Knockhill. Century Motorsport's Tom Oliphant and Luke Davenport, team-mate to Breeze, each won two races, while Pepe Massot won at Donington Park for JHR Developments, before moving into the Porsche Carrera Cup Great Britain. In the teams' championship, United Autosports claimed the championship by over 150 points from HHC Motorsport.

== Teams and drivers ==
For 2014, the G50 Cup car was no longer eligible for the championship and was replaced by the GT4 variant, allowing for increased entry numbers by opening it up to more foreign Ginetta owners. Furthermore, the newly homologated G55 model now conformed to GT4 specification. These changes led to the renaming of the championship to the 'GT4 Supercup'. Both cars ran in the same class through a balance of performance regulation introduced for 2014.

Team	No.	Drivers	Rounds
G55
United Autosports	2	(United Kingdom) Carl Breeze	All
United Autosports	23	(United Kingdom) Luke Davenport	All
Tollbar Racing	10	(United Kingdom) Tom Howard	8–10
Douglas Motorsport	11	(United Kingdom) Andrew Watson	All
Douglas Motorsport	88	(United Kingdom) Harry Woodhead	1–3
Academy Motorsport	13	(United Kingdom) Will Moore	9
Academy Motorsport	14	(United Kingdom) Will Burns	All
Academy Motorsport	46	(Sweden) Dennis Strandberg	8, 10
Academy Motorsport	52	(United Kingdom) Sean Huyton	1–2, 4–5
Century Motorsport	15	(United Kingdom) Tom Oliphant	All
Century Motorsport	36	(United Kingdom) Steve Fresle	10
Century Motorsport	43	(Norway) Aleksander Schjerpen	9
Century Motorsport	71	(United Kingdom) Jamie Orton	1–6
SV Racing; SV Racing with KX	18	(United Kingdom) Declan Jones	10
SV Racing; SV Racing with KX	27	(United Kingdom) Rory Bryant	7
SV Racing; SV Racing with KX	30	(United Kingdom) David Pittard	All
SV Racing; SV Racing with KX	66	(United Kingdom) Josh Cook	9
Algarve Pro Racing Team	24	(Portugal) Michael Munemann	5
Priocept Racing	24	(Portugal) Michael Munemann	3
Priocept Racing	79	(United Kingdom) Dan Norris-Jones	All
JHR Developments	25	(Spain) Pepe Massot	1–4
JHR Developments	41	(United Kingdom) Carl Boardley	1, 8–10
JHR Developments	45	(United Kingdom) Josh Wakefield	1
Richardson Racing	26	(United Kingdom) Giles Dawson	8
Sherwood Racing	28	(United Kingdom) James Owen	1
Fox Motorsport	48	(United Kingdom) Paul McNeilly	9–10
HHC Motorsport	55	(United Kingdom) Charlie Robertson	All
HHC Motorsport	71	(United Kingdom) Jamie Orton	7–10
Tolman Motorsport	56	(United Kingdom) David Pattison	9
FW Motorsport	91	(United Kingdom) Fergus Walkinshaw	1–3, 7, 10
Privateer	12	(United Kingdom) Reece Somerfield	1–7, 9–10
Privateer	19	(United Kingdom) Tom Wrigley	10
Privateer	70	(United Kingdom) Max Coates	5
Privateer	73	(United Kingdom) John Hindhaugh	8
G50
Privateer	20	(United Kingdom) Fraser Robertson	5, 9–10

== Race calendar and results ==
The series was held over 27 races at 10 rounds, supporting the 2014 British Touring Car Championship season at all rounds.

Round		Circuit	Date	Pole position	Fastest lap	Winning driver	Winning team
1	R1	Brands Hatch (Indy), Kent	29 March	(United Kingdom) Andrew Watson	(United Kingdom) Andrew Watson	(United Kingdom) Andrew Watson	Douglas Motorsport
1	R2	Brands Hatch (Indy), Kent	30 March		(United Kingdom) Carl Boardley	(United Kingdom) Charlie Robertson	HHC Motorsport
1	R3	Brands Hatch (Indy), Kent	30 March		(United Kingdom) Charlie Robertson	(United Kingdom) Luke Davenport	United Autosports
2	R4	Donington Park, Leicestershire	19 April	(United Kingdom) Charlie Robertson	(United Kingdom) Charlie Robertson	(United Kingdom) Charlie Robertson	HHC Motorsport
2	R5	Donington Park, Leicestershire	20 April		(United Kingdom) Charlie Robertson	(Spain) Pepe Massot	JHR Developments
2	R6	Donington Park, Leicestershire	20 April		(United Kingdom) David Pittard	(United Kingdom) Tom Oliphant	Century Motorsport
3	R7	Thruxton Circuit, Hampshire	3 May	(United Kingdom) Charlie Robertson	(United Kingdom) David Pittard	(United Kingdom) David Pittard	SV Racing with KX
3	R8	Thruxton Circuit, Hampshire	3 May		(United Kingdom) David Pittard	(United Kingdom) David Pittard	SV Racing with KX
3	R9	Thruxton Circuit, Hampshire	4 May		(United Kingdom) Andrew Watson	(United Kingdom) Andrew Watson	Douglas Motorsport
4	R10	Oulton Park, Cheshire	7 June	(United Kingdom) Charlie Robertson	(United Kingdom) Andrew Watson	(United Kingdom) Charlie Robertson	HHC Motorsport
4	R11	Oulton Park, Cheshire	8 June		(United Kingdom) Carl Breeze	(United Kingdom) Charlie Robertson	HHC Motorsport
5	R12	Croft Circuit, North Yorkshire	28 June	(United Kingdom) Charlie Robertson	(United Kingdom) Carl Breeze	(United Kingdom) Carl Breeze	United Autosports
5	R13	Croft Circuit, North Yorkshire	29 June		(United Kingdom) Charlie Robertson	(United Kingdom) Carl Breeze	United Autosports
5	R14	Croft Circuit, North Yorkshire	29 June		(United Kingdom) Luke Davenport	(United Kingdom) David Pittard	SV Racing with KX
6	R15	Snetterton Motor Racing Circuit, Norfolk	2 August	(United Kingdom) Charlie Robertson	(United Kingdom) Charlie Robertson	(United Kingdom) Charlie Robertson	HHC Motorsport
6	R16	Snetterton Motor Racing Circuit, Norfolk	3 August		(United Kingdom) Charlie Robertson	(United Kingdom) Charlie Robertson	HHC Motorsport
6	R17	Snetterton Motor Racing Circuit, Norfolk	3 August		(United Kingdom) Andrew Watson	(United Kingdom) Tom Oliphant	Century Motorsport
7	R18	Knockhill Racing Circuit, Fife	23 August	(United Kingdom) Carl Breeze	(United Kingdom) Carl Breeze	(United Kingdom) Carl Breeze	United Autosports
7	R19	Knockhill Racing Circuit, Fife	24 August		(United Kingdom) Carl Breeze	(United Kingdom) Carl Breeze	United Autosports
7	R20	Knockhill Racing Circuit, Fife	24 August		(United Kingdom) David Pittard	(United Kingdom) Luke Davenport	United Autosports
8	R21	Rockingham Motor Speedway, Northamptonshire	7 September	(United Kingdom) Charlie Robertson	(United Kingdom) Charlie Robertson	(United Kingdom) Charlie Robertson	HHC Motorsport
8	R22	Rockingham Motor Speedway, Northamptonshire	7 September		(United Kingdom) Jamie Orton	(United Kingdom) Andrew Watson	Douglas Motorsport
9	R23	Silverstone (National), Northamptonshire	28 September	(United Kingdom) David Pittard	(United Kingdom) David Pittard	(United Kingdom) David Pittard	SV Racing with KX
9	R24	Silverstone (National), Northamptonshire	28 September		(United Kingdom) David Pittard	(United Kingdom) David Pittard	SV Racing with KX
10	R25	Brands Hatch (GP), Kent	11 October	(United Kingdom) David Pittard	(United Kingdom) David Pittard	(United Kingdom) Andrew Watson	Douglas Motorsport
10	R26	Brands Hatch (GP), Kent	11 October		(United Kingdom) Andrew Watson	(United Kingdom) Andrew Watson	Douglas Motorsport
10	R27	Brands Hatch (GP), Kent	12 October		(United Kingdom) David Pittard	(United Kingdom) Charlie Robertson	HHC Motorsport

== Championship standings ==
=== Drivers' championship ===
A driver's best 25 scores counted towards the championship, with any other points being discarded.

Pos	Driver	BHI			DON			THR			OUL		CRO			SNE			KNO			ROC		SIL		BHGP			Total	Drop	Pen.	Points
1	(United Kingdom) Charlie Robertson	3	1	11	1	2	9	5	5	10	1	1	2	2	6	1	1	9	2	2	3	1	2	3	3	3	3	1	732	22		710
2	(United Kingdom) David Pittard	7	3	4	7	6	3	1	1	2	3	Ret	6	5	1	4	4	Ret	4	5	6	2	5	1	1	2	2	7	633		6	627
3	(United Kingdom) Carl Breeze	4	Ret	Ret	4	4	5	2	2	5	2	6	1	1	2	3	2	4	1	1	2	3	4	4	4	9	8	Ret	615			615
4	(United Kingdom) Andrew Watson	1	2	3	5	3	10	4	4	1	6	2	9	7	7	9	7	3	6	4	7	4	1	2	2	1	1	6	640	23	9	608
5	(United Kingdom) Tom Oliphant	6	4	2	8	5	1	3	3	4	Ret	7	3	9	4	2	3	1	Ret	9	9	6	3	5	5	6	4	2	558		12	546
6	(United Kingdom) Luke Davenport	10	5	1	6	9	2	10	13	9	5	3	4	Ret	5	7	8	6	9	6	1	Ret	8	9	8	8	7	4	451			451
7	(United Kingdom) Will Burns	Ret	10	6	10	Ret	Ret	6	6	Ret	7	5	5	4	3	5	5	2	3	3	4	5	7	Ret	Ret	Ret	Ret	DNS	360		6	354
8	(United Kingdom) Jamie Orton	2	Ret	Ret	11	10	4	8	9	6	4	8	7	8	DNS	6	6	5	5	Ret	5	Ret	6	6	6	5	Ret	DNS	354			354
9	(United Kingdom) Dan Norris-Jones	11	11	8	13	13	8	12	11	Ret	Ret	10	10	11	10	10	10	8	Ret	11	10	10	12	12	10	14	14	11	247			247
10	(United Kingdom) Reece Somerfield	9	9	7	12	12	Ret	13	DNS	11	Ret	9	12	10	Ret	8	9	7	8	10	DSQ			Ret	9	11	11	Ret	207		12	195
11	(Spain) Pepe Massot	14	14	5	2	1	12	7	7	8	9	11																	176			176
12	(United Kingdom) Sean Huyton	12	6	Ret	9	7	6				8	4	8	3	Ret														149			149
13	(United Kingdom) Fergus Walkinshaw	Ret	12	Ret	14	11	7	11	10	7									7	7	DSQ					10	12	10	142		18	124
14	(United Kingdom) Harry Woodhead	5	Ret	Ret	3	8	11	9	8	3																			122		9	113
15	(United Kingdom) Carl Boardley	Ret	7	10																		7	9	7	Ret	Ret	6	Ret	90			90
16	(United Kingdom) Declan Jones																									4	5	3	68			68
17	(United Kingdom) Tom Howard																					9	10	10	Ret	12	13	9	63			63
18	(Sweden) Dennis Strandberg																					8	Ret			7	9	5	62			62
19	(Portugal) Michael Munemann							14	12	12			11	12	9														56			56
20	(United Kingdom) Max Coates												13	6	8														40			40
21	(United Kingdom) Tom Wrigley																									13	10	8	33			33
22	(United Kingdom) Josh Cook																							8	7				30			30
23	(United Kingdom) Paul McNeilly																							14	11	15	15	Ret	29			29
24	(United Kingdom) James Owen	13	13	9																									28			28
25	(United Kingdom) Fraser Robertson												Ret	DNS	DNS									Ret	14	16	17	13	24			24
26	(United Kingdom) Rory Bryant																		Ret	8	8								28		6	22
27	(United Kingdom) Giles Dawson																					11	11						20			20
28	(United Kingdom) Josh Wakefield	8	8	Ret																									28		9	19
29	(United Kingdom) Steve Fresle																									17	16	12	18			18
30	(Norway) Aleksander Schjerpen																							13	12				17			17
31	(United Kingdom) David Pattison																							15	13				14			14
32	(United Kingdom) Will Moore																							11	Ret				10			10
33	(United Kingdom) John Hindhaugh																					12	Ret						9			9
Pos	Driver	BHI			DON			THR			OUL		CRO			SNE			KNO			ROC		SIL		BHGP			Total	Drop	Pen.	Points
