= 2015 Ginetta GT4 Supercup =

The 2015 Michelin Ginetta GT4 Supercup is a multi-event, one make GT motor racing championship held across England and Scotland. The championship features a mix of professional motor racing teams and privately funded drivers, competing in Ginetta G55s that conform to the technical regulations for the championship. It forms part of the extensive program of support categories built up around the BTCC centrepiece. It is the fifth Ginetta GT4 Supercup, having rebranded from the Ginetta G50 Cup, which ran between 2008 and 2010. The season commenced on 4 April at Brands Hatch – on the circuit's Indy configuration – and concludes on 11 October at the same venue, utilising the Grand Prix circuit, after twenty-seven races held at ten meetings, all in support of the 2015 British Touring Car Championship season.

== Teams and drivers ==
Team	No.	Drivers	Rounds
Professional
HHC Motorsport	3	(United Kingdom) Carl Breeze	All
HHC Motorsport	14	(United Kingdom) Will Burns	All
HHC Motorsport	71	(United Kingdom) Jamie Orton	1–7, 9–10
Carl Boardley Motorsport	4	(United Kingdom) Carl Boardley	9–10
SV Racing	7	(United Kingdom) Jack Clarke	1
SV Racing	41	(United Kingdom) Mitchell Hale	1–5
SV Racing	42	(United Kingdom) Bradley Ellis	2
SV Racing	99	(South Africa) Stephen Young	1
Century Motorsport	15	(United Kingdom) Tom Oliphant	All
Century Motorsport	48	(United Kingdom) Ollie Jackson	All
Total Control Racing	21	(United Kingdom) Callum Pointon	4, 9–10
R & J Motorsport	42	(United Kingdom) Ryan Hadfield	9
JHR	44	(United Kingdom) Michael Caine	1–7, 10
JHR	45	(United Kingdom) Stefan Hodgetts	9
Douglas Motorsport	64	(France) Gaëtan Paletou	3
Optimum Motorsport	75	(United Kingdom) Flick Haigh	6
Mectech	91	(United Kingdom) Bradley Smith	1–6, 8–10
Raw Motorsport	96	(United Kingdom) Rob Wheldon	10
Privateer	9	(United Kingdom) Rob Boston	2
Privateer	12	(United Kingdom) Reece Somerfield	All
Privateer	19	(United Kingdom) Tom Wrigley	All
Privateer	30	(United Kingdom) David Pittard	9
Privateer	81	(United Kingdom) Tom Hibbert	9–10
Privateer	92	(United Kingdom) Jordan Stilp	9–10
Amateur
Douglas Motorsport	6	(United Kingdom) Chris Ingram	1–2, 4–6, 9–10
Century Motorsport	11	(Japan) Osamu Kawashima	All
Century Motorsport	17	(United Kingdom) Matthew Cowley	10
Century Motorsport	36	(United Kingdom) Steve Fresle	10
Century Motorsport	88	(Russia) Ruben Anakhasyan	10
CWS 4x4 Spares	38	(United Kingdom) Keith White	3
CWS 4x4 Spares	78	(United Kingdom) Colin White	2–4, 6–7, 9–10
FW Motorsport	78	(United Kingdom) Colin White	1
Optimum Motorsport	46	(United Kingdom) Adrian Barwick	4, 6
Optimum Motorsport	50	(United Kingdom) Graham Johnson	9
Optimum Motorsport	51	(United Kingdom) Mike Robinson	10
Optimum Motorsport	61	(United Kingdom) Will Moore	6
HHC Motorsport	77	(Republic of Ireland) Connaire Finn	10
Privateer	77	(Republic of Ireland) Connaire Finn	4, 8–9
Privateer	5	(United Kingdom) Steve Tandy	10
Privateer	8	(United Kingdom) Fraser Robertson	All
Privateer	23	(Australia) Matthew Simmons	9
Privateer	32	(United Kingdom) Richard Roberts	1, 10
Privateer	76	(Republic of Ireland) Paul Monahan	4

== Race calendar and results ==
Round		Circuit	Date	Pole position	Fastest lap	Winning driver	Winning team	Amateur winner
1	R1	Brands Hatch (Indy Circuit, Kent)	4 April	(United Kingdom) Jamie Orton	(United Kingdom) Tom Oliphant	(United Kingdom) Jamie Orton	HHC Motorsport	(United Kingdom) Colin White
1	R2	Brands Hatch (Indy Circuit, Kent)	5 April		(United Kingdom) Will Burns	(United Kingdom) Jamie Orton	HHC Motorsport	(United Kingdom) Colin White
1	R3	Brands Hatch (Indy Circuit, Kent)	5 April		(United Kingdom) Carl Breeze	(United Kingdom) Reece Somerfield	Privateer	(United Kingdom) Colin White
2	R4	Donington Park (National Circuit, Leicestershire)	18 April	(United Kingdom) Jamie Orton	(United Kingdom) Tom Oliphant	(United Kingdom) Tom Oliphant	Century Motorsport	(Japan) Osamu Kawashima
2	R5	Donington Park (National Circuit, Leicestershire)	19 April		(United Kingdom) Rob Boston	(United Kingdom) Carl Breeze	HHC Motorsport	(United Kingdom) Colin White
2	R6	Donington Park (National Circuit, Leicestershire)	19 April		(United Kingdom) Rob Boston	(United Kingdom) Jamie Orton	HHC Motorsport	(United Kingdom) Colin White
3	R7	Thruxton Circuit (Hampshire)	9 May	(United Kingdom) Carl Breeze	(United Kingdom) Carl Breeze	(United Kingdom) Carl Breeze	HHC Motorsport	(Japan) Osamu Kawashima
3	R8	Thruxton Circuit (Hampshire)	9 May		(United Kingdom) Carl Breeze	(United Kingdom) Carl Breeze	HHC Motorsport	(United Kingdom) Colin White
3	R9	Thruxton Circuit (Hampshire)	10 May		(United Kingdom) Mitchell Hale	(United Kingdom) Michael Caine	JHR	(United Kingdom) Colin White
4	R10	Oulton Park (Island Circuit, Cheshire)	6 June	(United Kingdom) Jamie Orton	(United Kingdom) Carl Breeze	(United Kingdom) Jamie Orton	HHC Motorsport	(United Kingdom) Adrian Barwick
4	R11	Oulton Park (Island Circuit, Cheshire)	7 June		(United Kingdom) Jamie Orton	(United Kingdom) Carl Breeze	HHC Motorsport	(United Kingdom) Colin White
5	R12	Croft Circuit (North Yorkshire)	27 June	(United Kingdom) Tom Oliphant	(United Kingdom) Carl Breeze	(United Kingdom) Tom Oliphant	Century Motorsport	(Japan) Osamu Kawashima
5	R13	Croft Circuit (North Yorkshire)	28 June		(United Kingdom) Tom Oliphant	(United Kingdom) Tom Oliphant	Century Motorsport	(Japan) Osamu Kawashima
5	R14	Croft Circuit (North Yorkshire)	28 June		(United Kingdom) Tom Oliphant	(United Kingdom) Bradley Smith	Mectech	(Japan) Osamu Kawashima
6	R15	Snetterton Circuit (300 Circuit, Norfolk)	8 August	(United Kingdom) Tom Oliphant	(United Kingdom) Tom Oliphant	(United Kingdom) Tom Oliphant	Century Motorsport	(United Kingdom) Will Moore
6	R16	Snetterton Circuit (300 Circuit, Norfolk)	9 August		(United Kingdom) Will Burns	(United Kingdom) Tom Oliphant	Century Motorsport	(United Kingdom) Will Moore
6	R17	Snetterton Circuit (300 Circuit, Norfolk)	9 August		(United Kingdom) Tom Oliphant	(United Kingdom) Tom Wrigley	Privateer	(United Kingdom) Adrian Barwick
7	R18	Knockhill Racing Circuit (Fife)	22 August	(United Kingdom) Tom Oliphant	(United Kingdom) Tom Oliphant	(United Kingdom) Tom Oliphant	Century Motorsport	(United Kingdom) Colin White
7	R19	Knockhill Racing Circuit (Fife)	23 August		(United Kingdom) Jamie Orton	(United Kingdom) Tom Oliphant	Century Motorsport	(United Kingdom) Colin White
7	R20	Knockhill Racing Circuit (Fife)	23 August		(United Kingdom) Tom Oliphant	(United Kingdom) Tom Wrigley	Privateer	(United Kingdom) Colin White
8	R21	Rockingham Motor Speedway (International Super Sports Car Circuit, Northamptonshire)	5 September	(United Kingdom) Tom Oliphant	(United Kingdom) Carl Breeze	(United Kingdom) Carl Breeze	HHC Motorsport	(Republic of Ireland) Connaire Finn
8	R22	Rockingham Motor Speedway (International Super Sports Car Circuit, Northamptonshire)	6 September		(United Kingdom) Carl Breeze	(United Kingdom) Carl Breeze	HHC Motorsport	(United Kingdom) Fraser Robertson
9	R23	Silverstone Circuit (National Circuit, Northamptonshire)	26 September	(United Kingdom) Tom Wrigley	(United Kingdom) Tom Oliphant	(United Kingdom) Tom Oliphant	Century Motorsport	(Republic of Ireland) Connaire Finn
9	R24	Silverstone Circuit (National Circuit, Northamptonshire)	27 September		(United Kingdom) Jordan Stilp	(United Kingdom) Jamie Orton	HHC Motorsport	(United Kingdom) Graham Johnson
10	R25	Brands Hatch (Grand Prix Circuit, Kent)	10 October	(United Kingdom) Carl Breeze	(United Kingdom) Tom Wrigley	(United Kingdom) Carl Breeze	HHC Motorsport	(United Kingdom) Colin White
10	R26	Brands Hatch (Grand Prix Circuit, Kent)	11 October		(United Kingdom) Tom Oliphant	(United Kingdom) Carl Breeze	HHC Motorsport	(United Kingdom) Colin White
10	R27	Brands Hatch (Grand Prix Circuit, Kent)	11 October		(United Kingdom) Rob Wheldon	(United Kingdom) Michael Caine	JHR	(United Kingdom) Colin White

== Championship standings ==
=== Drivers' championships ===
Points system
1st	2nd	3rd	4th	5th	6th	7th	8th	9th	10th	11th	12th	13th	14th	15th	16th	17th	18th	19th	20th	R1 PP	FL
35	30	26	22	20	18	16	14	12	11	10	9	8	7	6	5	4	3	2	1	1	1

Notes

- A driver's best 25 scores counted towards the championship, with any other points being discarded.

Pos	Driver	BHI			DON			THR			OUL		CRO			SNE			KNO			ROC		SIL		BHGP			Total	Drop	Pen.	Points
Professional
1	(United Kingdom) Tom Oliphant	3	4	4	1	3	4	4	3	Ret	3	3	1	1	3	1	1	2	1	1	2	2	3	1	3	2	2	4	762	−22		740
2	(United Kingdom) Carl Breeze	2	2	2	3	1	5	1	1	3	2	1	4	2	Ret	Ret	7	3	4	9	5	1	1	3	4	1	1	3	705			705
3	(United Kingdom) Jamie Orton	1	1	5	2	2	1	2	5	Ret	1	2	3	7	4	2	2	5	3	3	Ret			2	1	21	8	7	603			603
4	(United Kingdom) Michael Caine	7	6	6	5	4	3	7	4	1	5	5	2	6	6	4	3	8	Ret	7	6					3	3	1	484			484
5	(United Kingdom) Will Burns	4	3	3	4	5	2	3	2	2	Ret	7	7	Ret	Ret	Ret	8	9	2	2	3	3	2	Ret	6	4	DNS	DNS	476			476
6	(United Kingdom) Tom Wrigley	11	9	9	10	9	7	9	9	10	7	10	6	4	5	5	5	1	5	5	1	5	6	Ret	8	7	7	6	439	−10		429
7	(United Kingdom) Reece Somerfield	5	5	1	9	7	6	10	6	8	6	6	8	5	2	Ret	12	4	7	6	4	7	7	8	10	Ret	15	11	428			428
8	(United Kingdom) Ollie Jackson	6	8	7	7	6	10	11	10	6	4	4	5	3	7	13	6	DSQ	6	4	9	4	4	5	7	6	5	5	455	−10	−18	427
9	(United Kingdom) Bradley Smith	10	11	DNS	8	Ret	8	5	7	5	Ret	8	13	8	1	3	4	DSQ				6	5	11	15	8	24	DNS	303		−12	291
10	(United Kingdom) Mitchell Hale	9	7	8	Ret	12	13	6	Ret	4	8	9	9	Ret	Ret														144		−20	124
11	(United Kingdom) Jordan Stilp																							4	2	5	4	Ret	95			95
12	(United Kingdom) Carl Boardley																							10	9	9	6	2	83			83
13	(United Kingdom) Callum Pointon										11	Ret												9	17	15	10	10	61			61
14	(United Kingdom) Flick Haigh															7	16	6											47			47
15	(United Kingdom) Rob Boston				6	10	9																						44			44
16	(France) Gaëtan Paletou							8	8	7																			44			44
17	(United Kingdom) Tom Hibbert																							15	18	11	13	14	42			42
18	(United Kingdom) David Pittard																							6	5				38			38
19	(United Kingdom) Mike Robinson																									10	9	9	35			35
20	(United Kingdom) Stefan Hodgetts																							7	11				26			26
21	(United Kingdom) Rob Wheldon																									Ret	11	8	25			25
22	(South Africa) Stephen Young	12	NC	11																									21			21
23	(United Kingdom) Jack Clarke	13	10	Ret																									20			20
24	(United Kingdom) Willie Moore																									Ret	14	12	17			17
25	(United Kingdom) Matthew Cowley																									13	20	Ret	15			15
26	(United Kingdom) Ryan Hadfield																							Ret	12				9			9
	(United Kingdom) Bradley Ellis				Ret	Ret	DNS																						0			0
Amateur
1	(United Kingdom) Colin White	8	12	10	Ret	8	11	13	11	9	10	11				8	10	11	8	8	7			14	19	12	12	13	702	−1		701
2	(Japan) Osamu Kawashima	14	14	15	11	11	Ret	12	12	11	13	Ret	10	9	8	10	15	10	9	10	8	9	9	16	22	Ret	21	17	680	−98		582
3	(United Kingdom) Fraser Robertson	Ret	13	12	12	14	12	14	13	Ret	Ret	Ret	12	10	9	12	13	13	10	11	Ret	Ret	8	17	20	Ret	22	20	504	−38	−15	451
4	(United Kingdom) Chris Ingram	16	15	13	13	13	Ret				14	NC	11	DNS	DNS	11	14	14						18	21	16	17	21	332			332
5	(Republic of Ireland) Connaire Finn										12	13										8	Ret	12	14	14	16	15	246			246
6	(United Kingdom) Adrian Barwick										9	12				9	11	7								Ret	19	16	200			200
7	(United Kingdom) Richard Roberts	15	16	14																						20	25	23	107			107
8	(United Kingdom) Willie Moore															6	9	12											96		−9	87
9	(United Kingdom) Keith White							15	14	12																			70			70
10	(United Kingdom) Steve Tandy																									19	18	19	58			58
11	(Australia) Matthew Simmons																							13	16				57			57
12	(United Kingdom) Steve Fresle																									18	23	18	54			54
13	(United Kingdom) Graham Johnson																							Ret	13				36			36
14	(Russia) Ruben Anakhasyan																									17	Ret	22	34			34
	(Republic of Ireland) Paul Monahan										Ret	Ret																	0			0
Pos	Driver	BHI			DON			THR			OUL		CRO			SNE			KNO			ROC		SIL		BHGP			Total	Drop	Pen.	Points
