= 2017 Porsche Carrera Cup Great Britain =

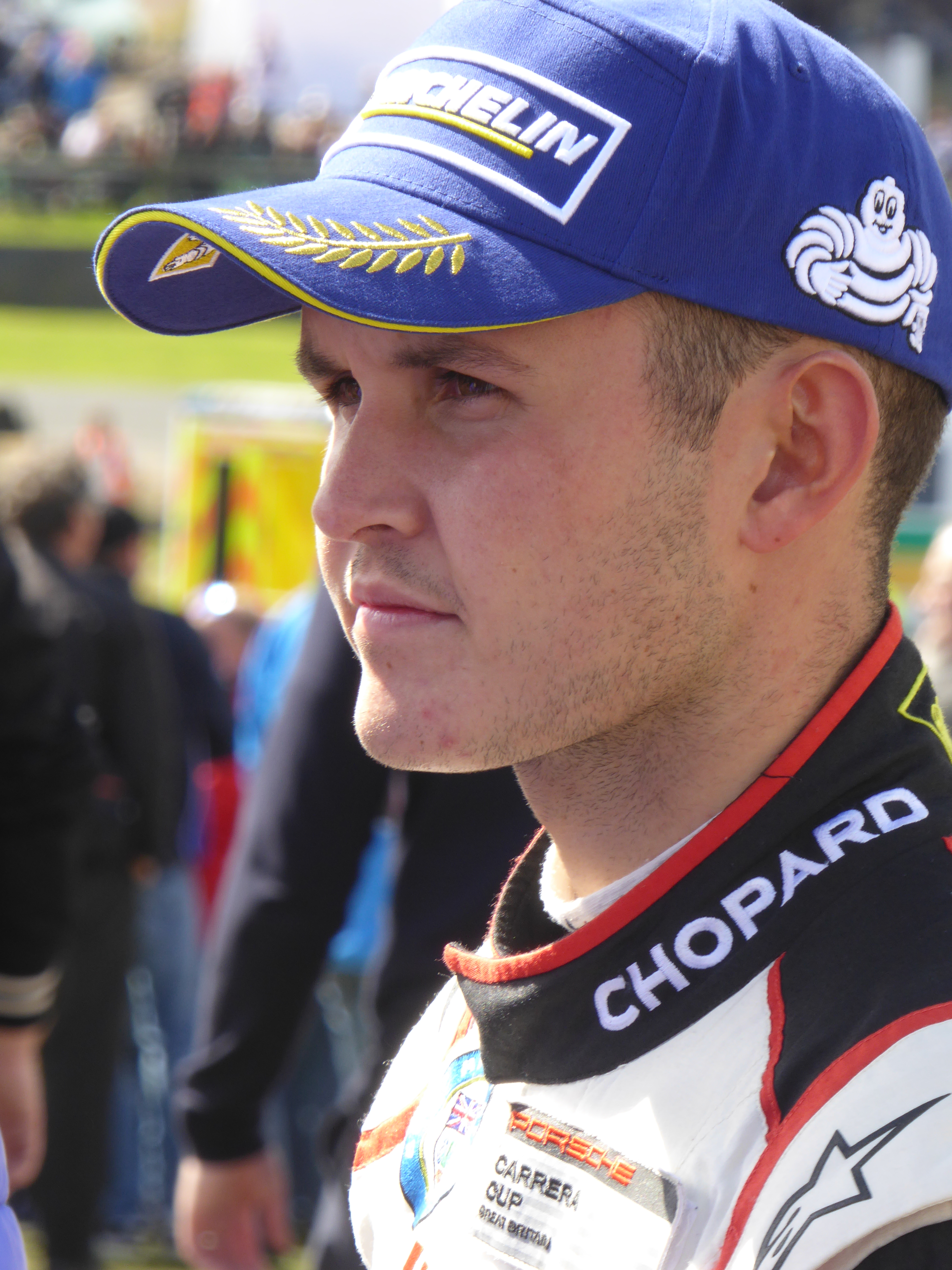
Charlie Eastwood, after finishing third in the first race at the Knockhill round. Eastwood won the championship on a tie-breaker round with Dino Zamparelli, taking four victories to Zamparelli's three.

The 2017 Porsche Carrera Cup Great Britain was a multi-event, one-make motor racing championship held across England and Scotland. The championship featured a mix of professional motor racing teams and privately funded drivers, competing in Porsche 911 GT3 cars which conformed to the technical regulations for the championship. It was conducted as part of the extensive program of support categories built up around the BTCC centrepiece. The 2017 season was the fifteenth Porsche Carrera Cup Great Britain season, commencing on 2 April at Brands Hatch – on the circuit's Indy configuration – and finished on 1 October at the same venue, utilising the Grand Prix circuit, after fifteen races at eight meetings. Fourteen of the races were held in support of the 2017 British Touring Car Championship, with a round in support of the 2017 24 Hours of Le Mans.

== Entry list ==
Team	No.	Driver	Rounds
Pro
Redline Racing	1	(United Kingdom) Dan Cammish	1–4, 6–8
Redline Racing	12	(United Kingdom) Scott Malvern	5
Redline Racing	15	(United Kingdom) Tom Oliphant	All
Redline Racing	28	(Republic of Ireland) Charlie Eastwood	All
Redline Racing	71	(United Kingdom) Jamie Orton	1–3
Redline Racing	81	(United Kingdom) Euan McKay	All
Redline Racing	91	(United Kingdom) Daniel McKay	All
JTR	8	(United Kingdom) Dino Zamparelli	All
JTR	11	(Cyprus) Tio Ellinas	All
JTR	77	(United Kingdom) Lewis Plato	All
IN2 Racing	19	(United Kingdom) Tom Wrigley	All
IN2 Racing	71	(United Kingdom) Jamie Orton	6–7
Slidesports	59	(United Kingdom) Ross Wylie	All
Pro-Am 1
Team Parker Racing	2	(United Kingdom) Alex Martin	All
Team Parker Racing	7	(United Kingdom) Justin Sherwood	All
Team Parker Racing	36	(Republic of Ireland) Karl Leonard	7–8
Team Parker Racing	42	(United Kingdom) Graeme Mundy	1–5, 7–8
Redline Racing	3	(United Kingdom) John McCullagh	5–8
G-Cat Racing	30	(United Kingdom) Peter Jennings	2–3
G-Cat Racing	76	(United Kingdom) Greg Caton	1, 4
Pro-Am 2
Race Car Centre	4	(United Kingdom) Peter Parsons	1–2, 4
Slidesports	9	(United Kingdom) David Fairbrother	1–3, 5–8
IN2 Racing	22	(United Kingdom) Peter Kyle-Henney	All
Asset Advantage Racing	23	(United Kingdom) Iain Dockerill	All
G-Cat Racing	31	(United Kingdom) Shamus Jennings	All
Welch Motorsport	33	(Australia) Matt Telling	1–4, 6–8
Team Parker Racing	49	(United Kingdom) Rupert Martin	All

== Race calendar and results ==
All races were held in the United Kingdom, excepting round at Circuit de la Sarthe which was held in France.

Round		Circuit	Date	Pole position	Fastest lap	Winning driver	Winning team
1	R1	Brands Hatch (Indy Circuit, Kent)	2 April	(United Kingdom) Dan Cammish	(United Kingdom) Dan Cammish	(United Kingdom) Dan Cammish	Redline Racing
1	R2	Brands Hatch (Indy Circuit, Kent)	2 April	(United Kingdom) Dan Cammish	(United Kingdom) Dino Zamparelli	(United Kingdom) Dan Cammish	Redline Racing
2	R3	Donington Park (National Circuit, Leicestershire)	15 April	(Republic of Ireland) Charlie Eastwood	(United Kingdom) Dan Cammish	(Republic of Ireland) Charlie Eastwood	Redline Racing
2	R4	Donington Park (National Circuit, Leicestershire)	16 April	(Republic of Ireland) Charlie Eastwood	(United Kingdom) Dan Cammish	(Republic of Ireland) Charlie Eastwood	Redline Racing
3	R5	Oulton Park (Island Circuit, Cheshire)	20 May	(United Kingdom) Dan Cammish	(United Kingdom) Dan Cammish	(United Kingdom) Dan Cammish	Redline Racing
3	R6	Oulton Park (Island Circuit, Cheshire)	21 May	(United Kingdom) Dan Cammish	(United Kingdom) Dan Cammish	(United Kingdom) Dan Cammish	Redline Racing
4	R7	Circuit de la Sarthe (Le Mans, Pays de la Loire)	17 June	(France) Florian Latorre	(Republic of Ireland) Charlie Eastwood	(United Kingdom) Dan Cammish	Redline Racing
5	R8	Snetterton Circuit (300 Circuit, Norfolk)	30 July	(Republic of Ireland) Charlie Eastwood	(United Kingdom) Dino Zamparelli	(Republic of Ireland) Charlie Eastwood	Redline Racing
5	R9	Snetterton Circuit (300 Circuit, Norfolk)	30 July	(Republic of Ireland) Charlie Eastwood	(Cyprus) Tio Ellinas	(United Kingdom) Dino Zamparelli	JTR
6	R10	Knockhill Racing Circuit (Fife)	13 August	(United Kingdom) Dan Cammish	(United Kingdom) Lewis Plato	(United Kingdom) Dan Cammish	Redline Racing
6	R11	Knockhill Racing Circuit (Fife)	13 August	(Republic of Ireland) Charlie Eastwood	(Republic of Ireland) Charlie Eastwood	(Republic of Ireland) Charlie Eastwood	Redline Racing
7	R12	Silverstone Circuit (National Circuit, Northamptonshire)	17 September	(United Kingdom) Dan Cammish	(United Kingdom) Dan Cammish	(United Kingdom) Dino Zamparelli	JTR
7	R13	Silverstone Circuit (National Circuit, Northamptonshire)	17 September	(United Kingdom) Dan Cammish	(United Kingdom) Dan Cammish	(United Kingdom) Dino Zamparelli	JTR
8	R14	Brands Hatch (Grand Prix Circuit, Kent)	1 October	(United Kingdom) Dan Cammish	(United Kingdom) Dan Cammish	(United Kingdom) Dan Cammish	Redline Racing
8	R15	Brands Hatch (Grand Prix Circuit, Kent)	1 October	(United Kingdom) Dan Cammish	(United Kingdom) Dan Cammish	(United Kingdom) Dan Cammish	Redline Racing

== Championship standings ==
Points system
	1st	2nd	3rd	4th	5th	6th	7th	8th	9th	10th	11th	12th	13th	14th	15th	PP	FL
Finishers	20	18	16	14	12	10	9	8	7	6	5	4	3	2	1	1	1
Pro-Am	10	9	8	7	6	5	4	3	2	1						1	1

A driver's best 14 scores counted towards the championship, with any other points being discarded.

=== Drivers' championships ===
==== Overall championship ====
Pos	Driver	BHI		DON		OUL		LMS	SNE		KNO		SILN		BHGP		Total	Pen	Drop	Pts
1	(Republic of Ireland) Charlie Eastwood	2	2	1	1	7	3	8	1	2	3	1	4	3	4	5	239	-3	8	228
2	(United Kingdom) Dino Zamparelli	5	3	DSQ	3	2	2	2	2	1	2	2	1	1	5	2	242	-2	12	228
3	(United Kingdom) Dan Cammish	1	1	2	4	1	1	1			1	Ret	2	Ret	1	1	210	0	0	210
4	(United Kingdom) Tom Oliphant	4	4	7	6	4	5	3	6	4	5	3	5	5	3	6	191	0	9	182
5	(United Kingdom) Lewis Plato	3	Ret	DSQ	2	3	4	Ret	3	9	4	5	7	4	7	4	161	0	0	161
6	(Cyprus) Tio Ellinas	9	5	5	5	Ret	DNS	Ret	4	3	6	4	3	2	2	3	158	-2	0	156
7	(United Kingdom) Euan McKay	6	6	4	7	8	6	4	5	6	8	9	6	6	Ret	9	140	0	0	140
8	(United Kingdom) Daniel McKay	7	7	6	10	5	7	15	8	7	7	8	8	7	9	7	124	0	1	123
9	(United Kingdom) Tom Wrigley	Ret	11	3	8	Ret	DNS	7	11	12	Ret	6	9	8	6	8	92	0	0	92
10	(United Kingdom) Ross Wylie	Ret	DNS	11	14	6	8	5	10	8	9	Ret	13	9	10	11	79	0	0	79
11	(United Kingdom) Alex Martin	10	8	10	11	Ret	Ret	6	9	11	11	13	11	11	11	13	73	0	0	73
12	(United Kingdom) Jamie Orton	Ret	9	8	9	Ret	9	WD			10	7	10	12			57	-2	0	55
13	(United Kingdom) Justin Sherwood	11	12	13	13	Ret	10	9	12	10	12	10	14	20	Ret	12	54	0	0	54
14	(United Kingdom) Peter Kyle-Henney	Ret	DNS	12	15	9	11	10	Ret	15	14	11	17	15	13	16	35	0	0	35
15	(United Kingdom) Shamus Jennings	14	14	Ret	17	10	12	12	17	18	16	12	18	16	14	17	24	0	0	24
16	(Republic of Ireland) Karl Leonard												12	12	8	10	22	0	0	22
17	(United Kingdom) Scott Malvern								7	5							21	0	0	21
18	(United Kingdom) Iain Dockerill	13	Ret	16	Ret	11	14	11	15	17	15	14	20	18	15	20	20	0	0	20
19	(United Kingdom) Graeme Mundy	12	13	Ret	16	12	13	Ret	Ret	13			16	14	Ret	15	20	0	0	20
20	(United Kingdom) John McCullagh								13	14	13	Ret	15	13	12	14	18	0	0	18
21	(United Kingdom) Greg Caton	8	10					Ret									14	0	0	14
22	(United Kingdom) Peter Jennings			9	12	Ret	DNS										11	0	0	11
23	(United Kingdom) David Fairbrother	17	18	14	19	Ret	Ret		14	16	18	15	19	17	Ret	18	5	0	0	5
24	(United Kingdom) Peter Parsons	15	15	15	Ret			14									5	0	0	5
25	(Australia) Matt Telling	Ret	17	17	20	Ret	16	13			Ret	17	DNS	DNS	17	21	3	0	0	3
26	(United Kingdom) Rupert Martin	16	16	18	18	Ret	15	Ret	16	19	17	16	21	19	16	19	1	0	0	1
Pos	Driver	BHI		DON		OUL		LMS	SNE		KNO		SILN		BHGP		Total	Pen	Drop	Pts
