= 2018 Porsche Carrera Cup Great Britain =

The 2018 Porsche Carrera Cup Great Britain was a multi-event, one-make motor racing championship held across England and Scotland. The championship featured a mix of professional motor racing teams and privately funded drivers, competing in Porsche 911 GT3 cars that conformed to the technical regulations for the championship. It formed part of the extensive program of support categories built up around the BTCC centrepiece. The 2018 season was the 16th Porsche Carrera Cup Great Britain season, commencing on 8 April at Brands Hatch – on the circuit's Indy configuration – and finished on 30 September at the same venue, utilising the Grand Prix circuit, after sixteen races at eight meetings. Fourteen of the races were held in support of the 2018 British Touring Car Championship, with a round in support of the 2018 European Le Mans Series at Monza.

== Entry list ==
Team	No.	Driver	Rounds
Pro
Redline Racing	8	(United Kingdom) Dino Zamparelli	All
Slidesports Engineering	11	(Cyprus) Tio Ellinas	All
GT Marques	12	(United Kingdom) Tom Jackson	7–8
GT Marques	43	(United Kingdom) James Kaye	1–3
JTR	19	(United Kingdom) Tom Wrigley	All
JTR	33	(United Kingdom) Daniel Harper	All
JTR	77	(United Kingdom) Lewis Plato	All
Team Parker Racing	32	(United Kingdom) George Gamble	All
Motorbase Performance	88	(France) Valentin Hasse-Clot	5
Motorbase Performance	300	(United Kingdom) Michael Caine	8
IN2 Racing	96	(United Kingdom) Will Bratt	2–4, 7
Pro-Am
Welch Motorsport	2	(United Kingdom) Rory Collingbourne	1–2, 4
Welch Motorsport	17	(United Kingdom) Daniel Welch	6–7
Welch Motorsport	41	(United Kingdom) Jake Giddings	5
Motorbase Performance	2	(United Kingdom) Rory Collingbourne	8
Motorbase Performance	55	(United Kingdom) Dan Vaughan	All
GT Marques	3	(United Kingdom) Esmee Hawkey	All
Team Parker Racing	7	(United Kingdom) Justin Sherwood	All
Team Parker Racing	66	(United Kingdom) Seb Perez	All
Redline Racing	10	(Australia) Sam Brabham	7
Redline Racing	72	(United Kingdom) Mike Wilds	8
JTR	71	(United Kingdom) Jamie Orton	All
G-Cat Racing	76	(United Kingdom) Greg Caton	1, 3
Am
GT Marques	4	(United Kingdom) Dan Kirby	5
Rob Boston Racing	5	(United Kingdom) Fraser Robertson	1–7
Slidesports	9	(United Kingdom) David Fairbrother	3–5, 7–8
Slidesports	84	(United Kingdom) Richard Hawken	All
G-Cat Racing	18	(United Kingdom) Gary Eastwood	1–5
G-Cat Racing	27	(United Kingdom) David Shaw	2, 7
G-Cat Racing	31	(United Kingdom) Shamus Jennings	1–7
IN2 Racing	22	(United Kingdom) Peter Kyle-Henney	1–7
Asset Advantage Racing	23	(United Kingdom) Iain Dockerill	All
Welch Motorsport	35	(United Kingdom) Steve Gales	2, 4–6, 8
Team Parker Racing	44	(United Kingdom) Peter Mangion	All

== Race calendar and results ==
The majority of the races will held in the United Kingdom, with the exception of the round held at Monza in Italy.

Round		Circuit	Date	Pole position	Fastest lap	Winning Pro	Winning team	Winning Pro-Am	Winning Am
1	R1	Brands Hatch (Indy Circuit, Kent)	7 April	(United Kingdom) Dino Zamparelli	(Cyprus) Tio Ellinas	(United Kingdom) Dino Zamparelli	Redline Racing	(United Kingdom) Jamie Orton	(United Kingdom) Peter Kyle-Henney
1	R2	Brands Hatch (Indy Circuit, Kent)	8 April		(United Kingdom) Daniel Harper	(United Kingdom) George Gamble	Team Parker Racing	(United Kingdom) Jamie Orton	(United Kingdom) Peter Mangion
2	R3	Donington Park (National Circuit, Leicestershire)	28 April	(Cyprus) Tio Ellinas	(United Kingdom) Dino Zamparelli	(Cyprus) Tio Ellinas	Slidesports Engineering	(United Kingdom) Dan Vaughan	(United Kingdom) David Shaw
2	R4	Donington Park (National Circuit, Leicestershire)	29 April		(United Kingdom) Dino Zamparelli	(United Kingdom) Lewis Plato	JTR	(United Kingdom) Jamie Orton	(United Kingdom) Peter Mangion
3	R5	Autodromo Nazionale Monza (Monza, Italy)	12 May	(United Kingdom) Daniel Harper	(United Kingdom) Dino Zamparelli	(United Kingdom) Dino Zamparelli	Redline Racing	(United Kingdom) Seb Perez	(United Kingdom) Peter Kyle-Henney
3	R6	Autodromo Nazionale Monza (Monza, Italy)	13 May		(United Kingdom) Dino Zamparelli	(United Kingdom) George Gamble	Team Parker Racing	(United Kingdom) Seb Perez	(United Kingdom) Iain Dockerill
4	R7	Oulton Park (Island Circuit, Cheshire)	9 June	(United Kingdom) Tom Wrigley	(United Kingdom) Lewis Plato	(United Kingdom) Tom Wrigley	JTR	(United Kingdom) Seb Perez	(United Kingdom) Peter Kyle-Henney
4	R8	Oulton Park (Island Circuit, Cheshire)	10 June		(United Kingdom) Daniel Harper	(United Kingdom) Daniel Harper	JTR	(United Kingdom) Dan Vaughan	(United Kingdom) Peter Mangion
5	R9	Snetterton Circuit (300 Circuit, Norfolk)	28 July	(Cyprus) Tio Ellinas	(United Kingdom) George Gamble	(United Kingdom) Dino Zamparelli	Redline Racing	(United Kingdom) Jamie Orton	(United Kingdom) Peter Mangion
5	R10	Snetterton Circuit (300 Circuit, Norfolk)	29 July		(United Kingdom) Daniel Harper	(United Kingdom) Tom Wrigley	JTR	(United Kingdom) Jamie Orton	(United Kingdom) Peter Mangion
6	R11	Knockhill Racing Circuit (Fife)	25 August	(United Kingdom) Daniel Harper	(Cyprus) Tio Ellinas	(United Kingdom) Daniel Harper	JTR	(United Kingdom) Seb Perez	(United Kingdom) Peter Mangion
6	R12	Knockhill Racing Circuit (Fife)	26 August		(United Kingdom) Daniel Harper	(United Kingdom) George Gamble	Team Parker Racing	(United Kingdom) Seb Perez	(United Kingdom) Peter Mangion
7	R13	Silverstone Circuit (National Circuit, Northamptonshire)	15 September	(United Kingdom) Dino Zamparelli	(United Kingdom) Dino Zamparelli	(United Kingdom) Dino Zamparelli	Redline Racing	(United Kingdom) Dan Vaughan	(United Kingdom) Peter Kyle-Henney
7	R14	Silverstone Circuit (National Circuit, Northamptonshire)	16 September		(United Kingdom) Daniel Harper	(United Kingdom) Tom Wrigley	JTR	(United Kingdom) Seb Perez	(United Kingdom) Peter Mangion
8	R15	Brands Hatch (Grand Prix Circuit, Kent)	29 September	(United Kingdom) Daniel Harper	(United Kingdom) Daniel Harper	(United Kingdom) Lewis Plato	JTR	(United Kingdom) Rory Collingbourne	(United Kingdom) Iain Dockerill
8	R16	Brands Hatch (Grand Prix Circuit, Kent)	30 September		(United Kingdom) Daniel Harper	(United Kingdom) Tom Wrigley	JTR	(United Kingdom) Rory Collingbourne	(United Kingdom) Peter Mangion

== Championship standings ==
Points system
	1st	2nd	3rd	4th	5th	6th	7th	8th	PP	FL
Race 1 (Pro)	12	10	8	6	4	3	2	1	2	1
Race 2 (All Classes)	10	8	6	5	4	3	2	1	0	1

=== Drivers' championships ===
==== Overall championship ====
Pos	Driver	BHI		DON		MNZ		OUL		SNE		KNO		SILN		BHGP		Pts
Pro Class
1	(Cyprus) Tio Ellinas	2	2	1	4	2	3	3	3	3	5	3	3	2	4	2	3	117
2	(United Kingdom) Dino Zamparelli	1	3	2	3	1	2	Ret	10	1	3	2	4	1	5	13	5	115
3	(United Kingdom) Tom Wrigley	6	5	4	2	3	4	1	4	5	1	5	6	3	1	3	1	108
4	(United Kingdom) Lewis Plato	3	4	5	1	Ret	7	2	2	4	2	6	5	8	3	1	2	95
5	(United Kingdom) Daniel Harper	13	7	3	7	Ret	8	4	1	2	4	1	2	5	2	9	4	84
6	(United Kingdom) George Gamble	4	1	7	DSQ	4	1	5	5	6	6	4	1	4	Ret	4	7	75
7	(United Kingdom) Will Bratt			9	5	Ret	Ret	11	8					6	7			18
8	(United Kingdom) James Kaye	12	11	18	10	13	16											12
9	(United Kingdom) Tom Jackson													12	10	5	6	10
10	(United Kingdom) Michael Caine															6	9	4
11	(France) Valentin Hasse-Clot									Ret	7							2
Pro-Am Class
1	(United Kingdom) Seb Perez	Ret	10	11	8	5	5	6	9	8	9	7	7	10	6	10	Ret	114
2	(United Kingdom) Dan Vaughan	9	13	6	11	7	6	7	6	9	10	8	8	7	8	Ret	10	107
3	(United Kingdom) Jamie Orton	5	6	8	6	Ret	9	9	7	7	8	Ret	10	Ret	Ret	8	Ret	96
4	(United Kingdom) Justin Sherwood	10	Ret	12	9	12	Ret	10	11	10	13	Ret	16	11	12	12	11	55
5	(United Kingdom) Esmee Hawkey	11	9	14	DSQ	6	10	12	Ret	14	12	10	11	13	11	11	13	54
6	(United Kingdom) Rory Collingbourne	8	8	10	Ret			8	Ret							7	8	48
7	(United Kingdom) Daniel Welch											9	9	9	9			28
8	(United Kingdom) Greg Caton	7	Ret			8	Ret											13
9	(United Kingdom) Mike Wilds															14	18	7
10	(Australia) Sam Brabham													16	13			6
11	(United Kingdom) Jake Giddings									Ret	11							5
Am Class
1	(United Kingdom) Peter Mangion	15	12	Ret	12	Ret	12	14	12	11	14	11	12	15	14	Ret	12	130
2	(United Kingdom) Peter Kyle-Henney	14	16	15	13	9	Ret	13	13	12	15	15	15	14	17			108
3	(United Kingdom) Iain Dockerill	17	Ret	20	16	10	11	15	14	20	17	12	13	17	16	15	14	95
4	(United Kingdom) Richard Hawken	19	15	17	17	14	15	17	15	15	20	14	17	22	20	17	16	65
5	(United Kingdom) Shamus Jennings	18	17	Ret	15	11	13	19	16	19	18	13	14	18	19			57
6	(United Kingdom) David Fairbrother					15	14	16	Ret	17	19			20	18	16	15	43
7	(United Kingdom) Gary Eastwood	16	14	16	14	16	DNS	Ret	17	18	Ret							34
8	(United Kingdom) Fraser Robertson	20	Ret	19	Ret	17	Ret	18	18	16	DSQ	Ret	19	21	21			20
9	(United Kingdom) Steve Gales			Ret	18			20	19	21	21	16	18			18	17	20
10	(United Kingdom) Dan Kirby									13	16							12
11	(United Kingdom) David Shaw			13	Ret									19	15			10
