= Jamie Orton =

British racing driver (born 1980)

- Nationality: British
- Born: 8 February 1980 (age 46) London, England

Porsche Carrera Cup Great Britain career
- Debut season: 2017
- Current team: JTR
- Car number: 71
- Starts: 22
- Wins: 0
- Podiums: 0
- Poles: 0
- Best finish: 12th in 2017

Previous series
- 2008 - 2018: Carerham Roadsports, Caterham R300, Ginetta GT4 Supercup

Championship titles
- 2010, 2011: Caterham Raodsport A, Caterham R300

Jamie Orton (born 8 February 1980 in London) is a British racing driver.

== Racing record ==
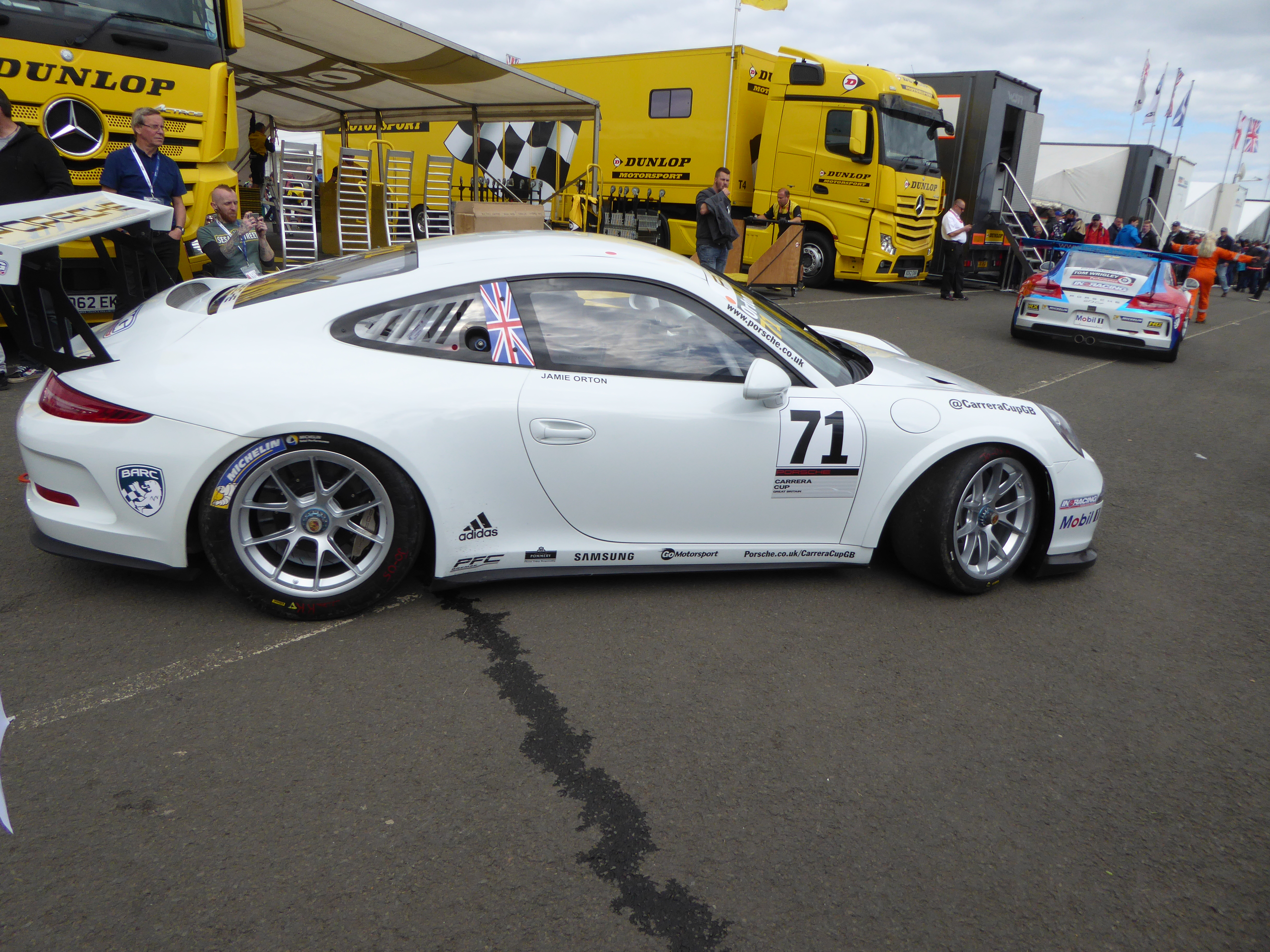
Orton, at the Knockhill round of the 2017 Porsche Carrera Cup Great Britain.

=== Career summary ===
Season	Series	Team	Races	Wins	Poles	F/Laps	Podiums	Points	Position
2011	Ginetta GT Supercup	TCR	2	0	0	0	0	11	21st
2012	Ginetta GT Supercup	Fauldsport	7	0	1	1	1	271	9th
2012	Ginetta GT Supercup	TCR	13	0	1	0	0	271	9th
2013	Ginetta GT Supercup	TCR	12	0	2	0	3	370	8th
2013	Ginetta GT Supercup	Century Motorsport	13	1	1	1	1	370	8th
2014	Ginetta GT4 Supercup	Century Motorsport	16	0	0	0	1	354	8th
2014	Ginetta GT4 Supercup	HHC Motorsport	9	0	0	1	0	354	8th
2015	Ginetta GT4 Supercup	HHC Motorsport	25	5	3	2	15	603	3rd
2016	Ginetta GT4 Supercup	Triple M Motorsport	19	7	2	5	12	438	4th
2017	Porsche Carrera Cup Great Britain - Pro	Redline Racing	6	0	0	0	0	55	12th
2017	Porsche Carrera Cup Great Britain - Pro	IN2 Racing	4	0	0	0	0	55	12th
2018	Porsche Carrera Cup Great Britain - Pro-Am	JTR	16	5	5	4	9	96	3rd
2019	Porsche Carrera Cup Great Britain - Pro-Am	JTR	6	1	1	3	3	41	5th
2019	Porsche Carrera Cup Great Britain - Pro	JTR	10	0	2	0	1	35	8th
2021	Porsche Carrera Cup Great Britain - Pro	JTR	16	0	1	0	1	33	8th
2025	British GT Championship - GT4	Rob Boston Racing							
