= 2019 Porsche Carrera Cup Great Britain =

17th Porsche Carrera Cup Great Britain season

The 2019 Porsche Carrera Cup Great Britain was a multi-event, one-make motor racing championship held across England and Scotland. The championship featured a mix of professional motor racing teams and privately funded drivers, competing in Porsche 911 GT3 cars that conformed to the technical regulations for the championship. It formed part of the extensive program of support categories built up around the BTCC centrepiece. The 2019 season was the 17th Porsche Carrera Cup Great Britain season, commencing on 6 April at Brands Hatch – on the circuit's Indy configuration – and finished on 13 October at the same venue, utilising the Grand Prix circuit, after sixteen races at eight meetings. Fourteen of the races were held in support of the 2019 British Touring Car Championship, with a round in support of the 2019–20 FIA World Endurance Championship at Silverstone.

Daniel Harper was the Pro champion driving with JTR, Karl Leonard claimed the Pro-Am title with Team Parker Racing and Justin Sherwood made it a double Team Parker win by dominating the Am class.

== Teams and Drivers ==
The following teams and drivers are currently signed to run the 2019 season.

Team	No.	Driver	R	Rounds
Pro Class
Amigos Redline Racing	1	(Cyprus) Tio Ellinas		7–8
Amigos Redline Racing	23	(United Kingdom) George Gamble		All
Amigos Redline Racing	77	(United Kingdom) Seb Perez		All
Team Parker Racing	9	(United Kingdom) Josh Webster		2–8
Motorbase Performance	11	(United Kingdom) Lewis Plato		All
Motorbase Performance	55	(United Kingdom) Dan Vaughan		All
Rob Boston Racing	19	(United Kingdom) Tom Wrigley		4
Rob Boston Racing	25	(United Kingdom) Tom Roche	R	All
In2Racing	27	(United Kingdom) Will Bratt		4
In2Racing	59	(United Kingdom) Ross Wylie		7–8
JTR	33	(United Kingdom) Daniel Harper		All
JTR	71	(United Kingdom) Jamie Orton		4–8
Pro-Am Class
Team Connect It	2	(United Kingdom) Aaron Mason		7–8
Team Connect It	10	(Australia) Sam Brabham		5–8
GT Marques	3	(United Kingdom) Esmee Hawkey		All
Redline Racing	4	(United Kingdom) Jack McCarthy	R	All
Team Parker Racing	36	(Republic of Ireland) Karl Leonard		All
JTR	71	(United Kingdom) Jamie Orton		1–3
Valluga Racing	72	(United Kingdom) Adam Hatfield	R	4, 6–8
Rob Boston Racing	99	(United Kingdom) Rob Boston	R	2, 7
Am Class
Redline Racing	5	(United Kingdom) Fraser Robertson		6–8
Redline Racing	15	(United Kingdom) John Ferguson	R	2-6
Rob Boston Racing	6	(United Kingdom) Dan Kirby		6
Team Parker Racing	7	(United Kingdom) Justin Sherwood		All
Team Parker Racing	24	(United Kingdom) Lucky Khera		7–8
Team Parker Racing	44	(United Kingdom) Peter Mangion		1
Team Parker Racing	98	(United Kingdom) Lee Frost		7–8
Valluga Racing	8	(United Kingdom) Adam Knight	R	1–2
JTR	8	(United Kingdom) Adam Knight	R	6–8
In2Racing	15	(United Kingdom) John Ferguson	R	1
In2Racing	22	(United Kingdom) Peter Kyle-Henney		All
Slidesports Engineering	84	(United Kingdom) Richard Hawken		1

Icon	Class
R	Rookie Category

== Race Calendar ==
Round	Circuit	Date	Pole position	Fastest lap	Winning Pro	Winning team	Winning Pro-Am	Winning Am
1	Brands Hatch (Indy Circuit, Kent)	7 April	(United Kingdom) Daniel Harper	(United Kingdom) Daniel Harper	(United Kingdom) Daniel Harper	JTR	(Republic of Ireland) Karl Leonard	(United Kingdom) Peter Mangion
1	Brands Hatch (Indy Circuit, Kent)	7 April		(United Kingdom) Lewis Plato	(United Kingdom) George Gamble	Amigos Redline Racing	(Republic of Ireland) Karl Leonard	(United Kingdom) Justin Sherwood
2	Donington Park (National Circuit, Leicestershire)	27 April	(United Kingdom) Josh Webster	(United Kingdom) Daniel Harper	(United Kingdom) Daniel Harper	JTR	(United Kingdom) Jack McCarthy	(United Kingdom) Justin Sherwood
2	Donington Park (National Circuit, Leicestershire)	28 April		(United Kingdom) Josh Webster	(United Kingdom) Josh Webster	Team Parker Racing	(United Kingdom) Jack McCarthy	(United Kingdom) John Ferguson
3	Croft Circuit (North Yorkshire)	16 June	(United Kingdom) Daniel Harper	(United Kingdom) Daniel Harper	(United Kingdom) Daniel Harper	JTR	(United Kingdom) Jamie Orton	(United Kingdom) Peter Kyle-Henney
3	Croft Circuit (North Yorkshire)	16 June		(United Kingdom) Josh Webster	(United Kingdom) Lewis Plato	Motorbase Performance	(Republic of Ireland) Karl Leonard	(United Kingdom) Peter Kyle-Henney
4	Oulton Park (Island Circuit, Cheshire)	29 June	(United Kingdom) Daniel Harper	(United Kingdom) Daniel Harper	(United Kingdom) Daniel Harper	JTR	(Republic of Ireland) Karl Leonard	(United Kingdom) Peter Kyle-Henney
4	Oulton Park (Island Circuit, Cheshire)	30 June		(United Kingdom) Daniel Harper	(United Kingdom) George Gamble	Amigos Redline Racing	(United Kingdom) Esmee Hawkey	(United Kingdom) Justin Sherwood
5	Thruxton Circuit (Hampshire)	18 August	(United Kingdom) Daniel Harper	(United Kingdom) Daniel Harper	(United Kingdom) Daniel Harper	JTR	(United Kingdom) Esmee Hawkey	(United Kingdom) John Ferguson
5	Thruxton Circuit (Hampshire)	18 August		(United Kingdom) Daniel Harper	(United Kingdom) Daniel Harper	JTR	(United Kingdom) Esmee Hawkey	(United Kingdom) John Ferguson
6	Silverstone Circuit (Arena Grand Prix Circuit, Northamptonshire)	30 August	(United Kingdom) Daniel Harper	(United Kingdom) Daniel Harper	(United Kingdom) Daniel Harper	JTR	(Republic of Ireland) Karl Leonard	(United Kingdom) John Ferguson
6	Silverstone Circuit (Arena Grand Prix Circuit, Northamptonshire)	1 September		(United Kingdom) Daniel Harper	(United Kingdom) Josh Webster	Team Parker Racing	(United Kingdom) Jack McCarthy	(United Kingdom) Adam Knight
7	Silverstone Circuit (National Circuit, Northamptonshire)	29 September	(United Kingdom) Daniel Harper	(United Kingdom) George Gamble	(United Kingdom) George Gamble	Amigos Redline Racing	(United Kingdom) Aaron Mason	(United Kingdom) Justin Sherwood
7	Silverstone Circuit (National Circuit, Northamptonshire)	29 September		(United Kingdom) George Gamble	(United Kingdom) George Gamble	Amigos Redline Racing	(United Kingdom) Aaron Mason	(United Kingdom) Justin Sherwood
8	Brands Hatch (Grand Prix Circuit, Kent)	13 October	(United Kingdom) Josh Webster	(United Kingdom) Daniel Harper	(United Kingdom) Josh Webster	Team Parker Racing	(United Kingdom) Jack McCarthy	(United Kingdom) Justin Sherwood
8	Brands Hatch (Grand Prix Circuit, Kent)	13 October		(United Kingdom) Daniel Harper	(United Kingdom) Daniel Harper	JTR	(United Kingdom) Jack McCarthy	(United Kingdom) Adam Knight

== Championship standings ==
Points system
	1st	2nd	3rd	4th	5th	6th	7th	8th	PP	FL
Race 1 (Pro)	12	10	8	6	4	3	2	1	2	1
Race 2 (All Classes)	10	8	6	5	4	3	2	1	0	1

=== Drivers' championships ===
==== Overall championship ====
Pos	Driver	BHI		DON		CRO		OUL		THR		SILGP		SILN		BHGP		Pts
Pro Class
1	(United Kingdom) Daniel Harper	1	3	1	3	1	(6)	1	4	1	1	1	4	7	4	4	1	159
2	(United Kingdom) Josh Webster			3	1	2	5	9	7	2	2	2	1	8	3	1	4	114
3	(United Kingdom) George Gamble	4	1	2	4	Ret	DNS	3	1	3	Ret	4	2	1	1	2	3	113
4	(United Kingdom) Lewis Plato	2	2	4	2	9	3	2	3	8	3	3	5	(11)	9	Ret	6	94
5	(United Kingdom) Seb Perez	3	4	Ret	6	4	8	8	10	4	4	6	Ret	12	15	6	7	57
6	(United Kingdom) Dan Vaughan	7	Ret	5	5	5	4	7	8	10	6	5	3	Ret	13	Ret	9	51
7	(United Kingdom) Tom Roche	15	8	8	DSQ	Ret	7	4	5	7	8	9	6	16	6	17	11	46
8	(United Kingdom) Jamie Orton							5	2	6	13	12	7	10	16	7	8	35
-	(Cyprus) Tio Ellinas*													Ret	2	3	2	-
-	(United Kingdom) Ross Wylie*													2	5	5	5	-
-	(United Kingdom) Tom Wrigley*							6	6									-
-	(United Kingdom) Will Bratt*							12	11									-
Pro-Am Class
1	(Republic of Ireland) Karl Leonard	5	5	11	11	6	1	10	13	11	11	8	(17)	15	11	11	Ret	126
2	(United Kingdom) Jack McCarthy	8	7	6	7	Ret	2	Ret	12	15	7	10	8	13	12	8	10	116
3	(United Kingdom) Esmee Hawkey	6	9	9	8	7	11	16	9	5	5	Ret	11	17	Ret	12	12	110
4	(United Kingdom) Adam Hatfield							14	17			11	10	Ret	17	10	13	52
5	(United Kingdom) Jamie Orton	9	6	7	Ret	3	12											41
6	(United Kingdom) Rob Boston			12	Ret									DNS	DNS			4
-	(United Kingdom) Aaron Mason*													4	8	Ret	21	-
-	(Australia) Sam Brabham*									14	Ret	7	9	14	14	9	14	-
Am Class
1	(United Kingdom) Justin Sherwood	11	10	10	10	10	10	15	14	12	(12)	14	12	3	7	13	16	149
2	(United Kingdom) Peter Kyle-Henney	13	12	15	12	8	9	11	16	13	10	Ret	14	5	10	Ret	17	102
3	(United Kingdom) John Ferguson	12	14	13	9	Ret	Ret	13	15	9	9	13	Ret					76
4	(United Kingdom) Adam Knight	14	15	14	13							15	13	19	18	14	15	70
5	(United Kingdom) Peter Mangion	10	11															18
6	(United Kingdom) Richard Hawken	16	13															8
-	(United Kingdom) Lucky Khera*													6	Ret	15	18	-
-	(United Kingdom) Lee Frost*													9	20	16	19	-
-	(United Kingdom) Dan Kirby*											16	15					-
-	(United Kingdom) Fraser Robertson*											Ret	16	18	19	Ret	20	-
Pos	Driver	BHI		DON		CRO		OUL		THR		SILGP		SILN		BHGP		Pts

* Guest entry - not eligible for points

==== Rookie Category ====
Pos	Driver	BHI		DON		CRO		OUL		THR		SILGP		SILN		BHGP		Pts
1	(United Kingdom) Tom Roche	15	8	8	DSQ	Ret	7	4	5	7	8	9	6	16	6	17	11	117
2	(United Kingdom) Jack McCarthy	8	7	6	7	Ret	2	Ret	12	15	7	10	8	13	12	8	10	112
3	(United Kingdom) John Ferguson	12	14	13	9	Ret	Ret	13	15	9	9	13	Ret					42
4	(United Kingdom) Adam Hatfield							14	17			11	10	Ret	17	10	13	35
5	(United Kingdom) Adam Knight	14	15	14	13							15	13	19	18	14	15	28
6	(United Kingdom) Rob Boston			12	Ret									DNS	DNS			4
Pos	Driver	BHI		DON		CRO		OUL		THR		SILGP		SILN		BHGP		Pts
