= 2016 Ginetta GT4 Supercup =

The 2016 Michelin Ginetta GT4 Supercup is a multi-event, one make GT motor racing championship held across England and Scotland. The championship features a mix of professional motor racing teams and privately funded drivers, competing in Ginetta G55s that conform to the technical regulations for the championship. It forms part of the extensive program of support categories built up around the BTCC centrepiece. It is the sixth Ginetta GT4 Supercup, having rebranded from the Ginetta G50 Cup, which ran between 2008 and 2010. The season commenced on 2 April at Brands Hatch – on the circuit's Indy configuration – and concludes on 2 October at the same venue, utilising the Grand Prix circuit, after twenty-two races held at eight meetings, all in support of the 2016 British Touring Car Championship season.

== Teams and drivers ==
Team	No.	Drivers	Rounds
Professional
Xentek Motorsport	3	(United Kingdom) Ollie Chadwick	7
Total Control Racing	7	(United Kingdom) Callum Pointon	All
Total Control Racing	77	(United Kingdom) Mark Davies	All
Douglas Motorsport	14	(United Kingdom) Will Burns	All
Rob Boston Racing	19	(United Kingdom) Tom Wrigley	All
Century Motorsport	21	(United Kingdom) Declan Jones	3
Century Motorsport	42	(United Kingdom) Jack Mitchell	7–8
Century Motorsport	89	(United Kingdom) Jack Bartholomew	8
Super Green Racing	22	(United Kingdom) Ben Green	All
Carl Boardley Motorsport	41	(United Kingdom) Carl Boardley	All
Amigo Motorsport	46	(United Kingdom) Rob Gaffney	1–4, 6–8
Fox Motorsport	48	(United Kingdom) Jamie Stanley	8
Triple M Motorsport	71	(United Kingdom) Jamie Orton	1–4, 6–8
RAW Motorsport	96	(United Kingdom) Rob Wheldon	1–2
Privateer	12	(United Kingdom) Reece Somerfield	1–5, 7–8
Privateer	81	(United Kingdom) Tom Hibbert	All
Amateur
RAW Motorsport	4	(United Kingdom) Grahame Tilley	1–5, 7–8
Rob Boston Racing	5	(United Kingdom) Fraser Robertson	All
Douglas Motorsport	6	(United Kingdom) Chris Ingram	All
Douglas Motorsport	72	(United Kingdom) Mike Newbold	1–6
Century Motorsport	11	(United Kingdom) James Guess	1–2
Century Motorsport	33	(United Kingdom) Chris Car	4, 6–7
Century Motorsport	44	(United Kingdom) Gary Lancashire	3, 7
Century Motorsport	88	(United Kingdom) John Wall	1–2
Brooks Motorsport	67	(United Kingdom) David Brooks	3–8
CWS 4x4 Spares	78	(United Kingdom) Colin White	All

== Race calendar and results ==
Round		Circuit	Date	Pole position	Fastest lap	Winning driver	Winning team	Amateur winner
1	R1	Brands Hatch (Indy Circuit, Kent)	2 April	(United Kingdom) Jamie Orton	(United Kingdom) Jamie Orton	(United Kingdom) Jamie Orton	Triple M Motorsport	(United Kingdom) Colin White
1	R2	Brands Hatch (Indy Circuit, Kent)	3 April		(United Kingdom) Jamie Orton	(United Kingdom) Tom Wrigley	Rob Boston Racing	(United Kingdom) Colin White
1	R3	Brands Hatch (Indy Circuit, Kent)	3 April		(United Kingdom) Tom Hibbert	(United Kingdom) Will Burns	Douglas Motorsport	(United Kingdom) Colin White
2	R4	Donington Park (National Circuit, Leicestershire)	16 April	(United Kingdom) Tom Wrigley	(United Kingdom) Tom Wrigley	(United Kingdom) Tom Wrigley	Rob Boston Racing	(United Kingdom) Grahame Tilley
2	R5	Donington Park (National Circuit, Leicestershire)	17 April		(United Kingdom) Jamie Orton	(United Kingdom) Tom Wrigley	Rob Boston Racing	(United Kingdom) Colin White
2	R6	Donington Park (National Circuit, Leicestershire)	17 April		(United Kingdom) Tom Wrigley	(United Kingdom) Tom Wrigley	Rob Boston Racing	(United Kingdom) Colin White
3	R7	Oulton Park (Island Circuit, Cheshire)	4 June	(United Kingdom) Tom Wrigley	(United Kingdom) Tom Wrigley	(United Kingdom) Tom Wrigley	Rob Boston Racing	(United Kingdom) Colin White
3	R8	Oulton Park (Island Circuit, Cheshire)	5 June		(United Kingdom) Tom Wrigley	(United Kingdom) Tom Wrigley	Rob Boston Racing	(United Kingdom) Colin White
4	R9	Snetterton Circuit (300 Circuit, Norfolk)	30 July	(United Kingdom) Jamie Orton	(United Kingdom) Tom Wrigley	(United Kingdom) Jamie Orton	Triple M Motorsport	(United Kingdom) Colin White
4	R10	Snetterton Circuit (300 Circuit, Norfolk)	31 July		(United Kingdom) Jamie Orton	(United Kingdom) Jamie Orton	Triple M Motorsport	(United Kingdom) Colin White
4	R11	Snetterton Circuit (300 Circuit, Norfolk)	31 July	Race cancelled (Note: The race was cancelled after the British Touring Car Championship had gone overtime, due to two red flag stoppages in Race 2 and Race 3. The race was postponed until the next event at the Knockhill Racing Circuit.)				
5	R11	Knockhill Racing Circuit (Fife)	13 August		(United Kingdom) Carl Boardley	(United Kingdom) Tom Wrigley	Rob Boston Racing	(United Kingdom) Colin White
5	R12	Knockhill Racing Circuit (Fife)	13 August	(United Kingdom) Tom Wrigley	(United Kingdom) Tom Wrigley	(United Kingdom) Tom Wrigley	Rob Boston Racing	(United Kingdom) Colin White
5	R13	Knockhill Racing Circuit (Fife)	14 August		(United Kingdom) Tom Wrigley	(United Kingdom) Tom Wrigley	Rob Boston Racing	(United Kingdom) Chris Ingram
5	R14	Knockhill Racing Circuit (Fife)	14 August		(United Kingdom) Will Burns	(United Kingdom) Will Burns	Douglas Motorsport	(United Kingdom) Colin White
6	R15	Rockingham Motor Speedway (International Super Sports Car Circuit, Northamptonshire)	27 August	(United Kingdom) Tom Wrigley	(United Kingdom) Jamie Orton	(United Kingdom) Jamie Orton	Triple M Motorsport	(United Kingdom) Colin White
6	R16	Rockingham Motor Speedway (International Super Sports Car Circuit, Northamptonshire)	28 August		(United Kingdom) Tom Wrigley	(United Kingdom) Jamie Orton	Triple M Motorsport	(United Kingdom) Colin White
6	R17	Rockingham Motor Speedway (International Super Sports Car Circuit, Northamptonshire)	28 August		(United Kingdom) Will Burns	(United Kingdom) Mark Davies	Total Control Racing	(United Kingdom) Chris Ingram
7	R18	Silverstone Circuit (National Circuit, Northamptonshire)	17 September	(United Kingdom) Carl Boardley	(United Kingdom) Tom Wrigley	(United Kingdom) Jamie Orton	Triple M Motorsport	(United Kingdom) Colin White
7	R19	Silverstone Circuit (National Circuit, Northamptonshire)	17 September		(United Kingdom) Carl Boardley	(United Kingdom) Jamie Orton	Triple M Motorsport	(United Kingdom) Fraser Robertson
7	R20	Silverstone Circuit (National Circuit, Northamptonshire)	18 September		(United Kingdom) Carl Boardley	(United Kingdom) Carl Boardley	Carl Boardley Motorsport	(United Kingdom) Colin White
8	R21	Brands Hatch (Grand Prix Circuit, Kent)	1 October	(United Kingdom) Will Burns	(United Kingdom) Mark Davies	(United Kingdom) Will Burns	Douglas Motorsport	(United Kingdom) Colin White
8	R22	Brands Hatch (Grand Prix Circuit, Kent)	2 October		(United Kingdom) Mark Davies	(United Kingdom) Tom Hibbert	Privateer	(United Kingdom) David Brooks
8	R23	Brands Hatch (Grand Prix Circuit, Kent)	2 October		(United Kingdom) Carl Boardley	(United Kingdom) Carl Boardley	Carl Boardley Motorsport	(United Kingdom) Colin White

== Championship standings ==
=== Drivers' championships ===
Points system
1st	2nd	3rd	4th	5th	6th	7th	8th	9th	10th	11th	12th	13th	14th	15th	16th	17th	18th	19th	20th	R1 PP	FL
35	30	26	22	20	18	16	14	12	11	10	9	8	7	6	5	4	3	2	1	1	1

Notes

- A driver's best 20 scores counted towards the championship, with any other points being discarded.

Pos	Driver	BHI			DON			OUL		SNE			KNO				ROC			SIL			BHGP			Total	Drop	Pen.	Points
Professional
1	(United Kingdom) Tom Wrigley	2	1	3	1	1	1	1	1	3	2	C	1	1	1	7	Ret	Ret	5	3	4	2	7	8	3	636	32		604
2	(United Kingdom) Will Burns	4	3	1	3	2	11	2	2	2	4	C	12	2	2	1	2	3	2	4	3	3	1	5	2	662	61		601
3	(United Kingdom) Carl Boardley	6	4	Ret	4	4	2	7	6	4	3	C	2	Ret	6	4	3	6	Ret	5	2	1	4	3	1	493	16		477
4	(United Kingdom) Jamie Orton	1	2	11	2	3	10	3	4	1	1	C					1	1	3	1	1	Ret	11	Ret	Ret	438			438
5	(United Kingdom) Mark Davies	7	6	7	6	Ret	7	4	3	5	7	C	3	3	5	Ret	4	5	1	Ret	6	4	2	9	Ret	392			392
6	(United Kingdom) Callum Pointon	8	8	5	7	9	6	6	8	14	8	C	8	6	7	10	5	4	8	2	5	12	6	7	6	412	39		373
7	(United Kingdom) Tom Hibbert	10	11	4	5	5	4	8	10	6	5	C	Ret	5	4	2	6	2	4	Ret	8	8	5	1	Ret	381	10		371
8	(United Kingdom) Ben Green	Ret	DNS	10	10	6	3	Ret	9	15	Ret	C	4	4	3	3	Ret	7	6	Ret	10	6	8	10	7	282			282
9	(United Kingdom) Rob Gaffney	5	7	8	9	7	8	Ret	11	17	9	C					8	9	7	6	7	9	10	6	8	260			260
10	(United Kingdom) Reece Somerfield	9	5	2	Ret	Ret	9	9	7	8	6	C	5	Ret	Ret	Ret				8	16	7	12	2	5	257			257
11	(United Kingdom) Rob Wheldon	3	10	6	8	8	5																			104			104
12	(United Kingdom) Jack Mitchell																			Ret	9	5	3	4	4	102			102
13	(United Kingdom) Declan Jones							5	5																	40			40
14	(United Kingdom) Ollie Chadwick																			9	Ret	10				25			25
15	(United Kingdom) Jack Bartholomew																						9	Ret	9	24			24
16	(United Kingdom) Jack Stanley																						16	11	Ret	18			18
Amateur
1	(United Kingdom) Colin White	11	9	9	14	10	12	10	12	7	10	C	6	7	Ret	5	7	8	Ret	7	Ret	11	13	Ret	10	596			596
2	(United Kingdom) Chris Ingram	15	14	13	15	14	15	12	13	10	13	C	7	8	8	6	10	11	9	10	12	14	14	14	Ret	547	62		485
3	(United Kingdom) Grahame Tilley	14	13	14	11	13	13	11	Ret	9	11	C	11	9	9	Ret				14	13	Ret	15	15	11	447			447
4	(United Kingdom) Fraser Robertson	13	NC	Ret	12	11	16	15	14	12	Ret	C	Ret	11	Ret	9	9	10	12	12	11	15	Ret	13	12	414		−5	409
5	(United Kingdom) David Brooks							13	16	13	14	C	9	10	10	8	Ret	12	10	11	14	13	Ret	12	Ret	339			339
6	(United Kingdom) Mike Newbold	16	15	Ret	16	15	Ret	14	15	16	15	C	10	NC	Ret	Ret	11	14	13							232			232
7	(United Kingdom) James Guess	12	12	12	13	12	14																			170			170
8	(United Kingdom) Chris Car									11	12	C					12	13	11	13	15	Ret				154			154
9	(United Kingdom) Gary Lancashire							16	17											15	17	16				88			88
10	(United Kingdom) John Wall	17	16	Ret	Ret	DNS	DNS																			34			34
Pos	Driver	BHI			DON			OUL		SNE			KNO				ROC			SIL			BHGP			Total	Drop	Pen.	Points
