= Sam Brabham =

Australian racing driver

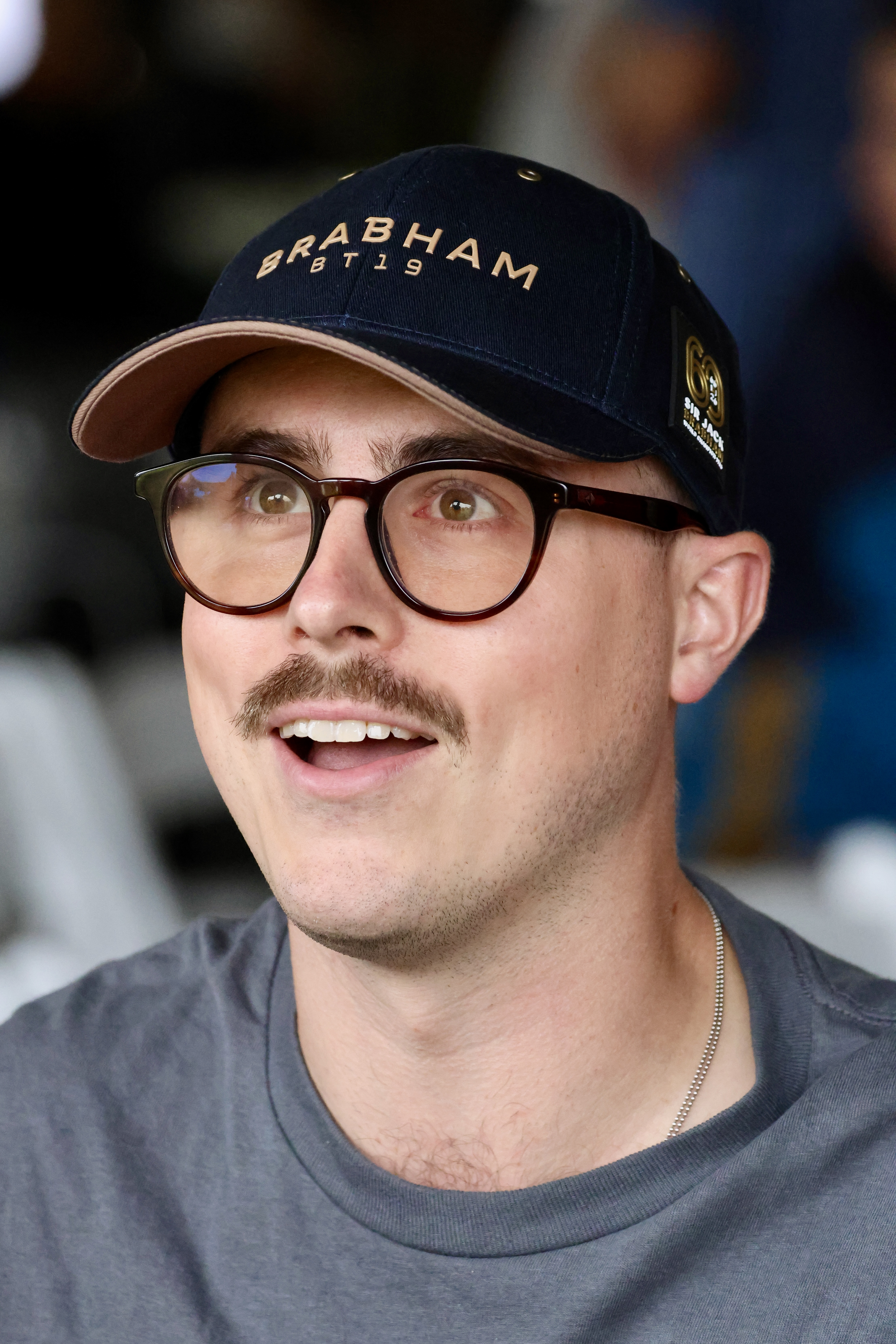
- Brabham at the 2026 Adelaide Motorsport Festival
- Nationality: (Australia) Australian
- Born: 18 August 1994 (age 32) Slough, England, UK
- Relatives: Sir Jack Brabham (grandfather); David Brabham (father); Lisa Thackwell (mother); Geoff Brabham (uncle); Gary Brabham (uncle); Mike Thackwell (uncle); Matthew Brabham (cousin)

Carrera Cup GB - Pro Am
- Categorisation: FIA Silver
- Years active: 2018–19
- Teams: Team Connect It (Brookspeed)
- Starts: 8
- Wins: 1
- Poles: 0
- Fastest laps: 1
- Best finish: 10th in 2018

Previous series
- 2013, 14 2013–14 2018, 19: British Formula Ford; MRF Challenge; Carrera Cup Great Britain

Samuel Brabham is an Australian racing driver. Brabham is a third-generation racing driver; he is the son of David Brabham, nephew to Geoff Brabham, Gary Brabham, Mike Thackwell, and the grandson of three time Formula One World Champion Sir Jack Brabham. He is also the cousin of Matthew Brabham.

== Career ==
Brabham started off in karts in 2011 aged 16 and quickly proceeded to the British Formula Ford Championship in 2013 finishing fourth in the championship and second in the scholarship class. He joined the MRF Formula 2000 Challenge in late 2013 for his first taste of 'wings & slicks' formula finishing ninth for the series.

In 2018, Brabham returned to the track in the 2018 Porsche Carrera Cup Great Britain Pro Am class finishing tenth for the championship. He returned in 2019 as a guest driver.

== Racing record ==
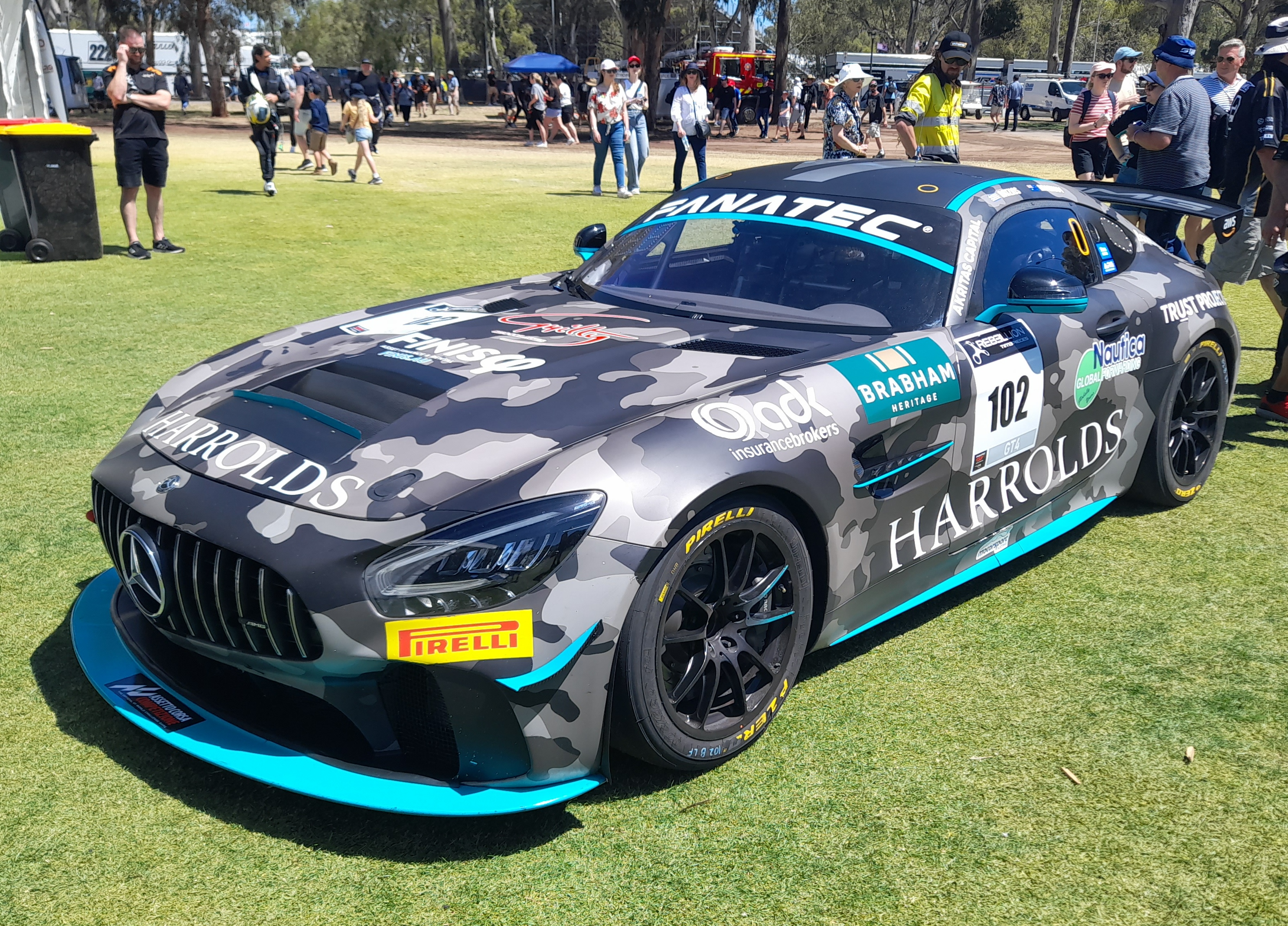
Brabham placed second in the GT4 class of the 2022 GT World Challenge Australia driving a Mercedes-AMG GT4

=== Career summary ===
Season	Series	Team	Races	Wins	Poles	F/laps	Podiums	Points	Position
2013	British Formula Ford Championship	JTR	27	0	0	0	6	16	4th
2013	British Formula Ford Championship - Scholarship Class	JTR	27	6	?	?	?	?	2nd
2013-14	MRF Challenge Formula 2000 Championship	MRF Racing	13	0	0	0	0	34	9th
2014	British Formula Ford Championship	JTR	12	2	2	1	4	186	11th
2018	Porsche Carrera Cup Great Britain - Pro-Am	Redline Racing	2	0	0	0	0	6	10th
2019	Porsche Carrera Cup Great Britain - Pro-Am	Team Connect It	8	1	0	1	4	0	NC†
2022	GT World Challenge Australia - GT4	Harrolds Racing	5	3	3	3	5	93	2nd
2023	GT World Challenge Australia - Pro-Am	Harrolds Volante Rosso Motorsport	4	0	0	0	0	28	16th
2023	Lamborghini Super Trofeo Asia - Pro	Aces Zagame	2	0	0	0	2	22	7th
2024	GT4 Australia Series - Silver	Love Racing	10	0	1	0	1	148	6th
2026	GT4 Australia Series - Silver	Murphy Racing by Team Soutar Motorsport							

† Guest driver.
