= Tom Oliphant (racing driver) =

British racing driver (born 1990)

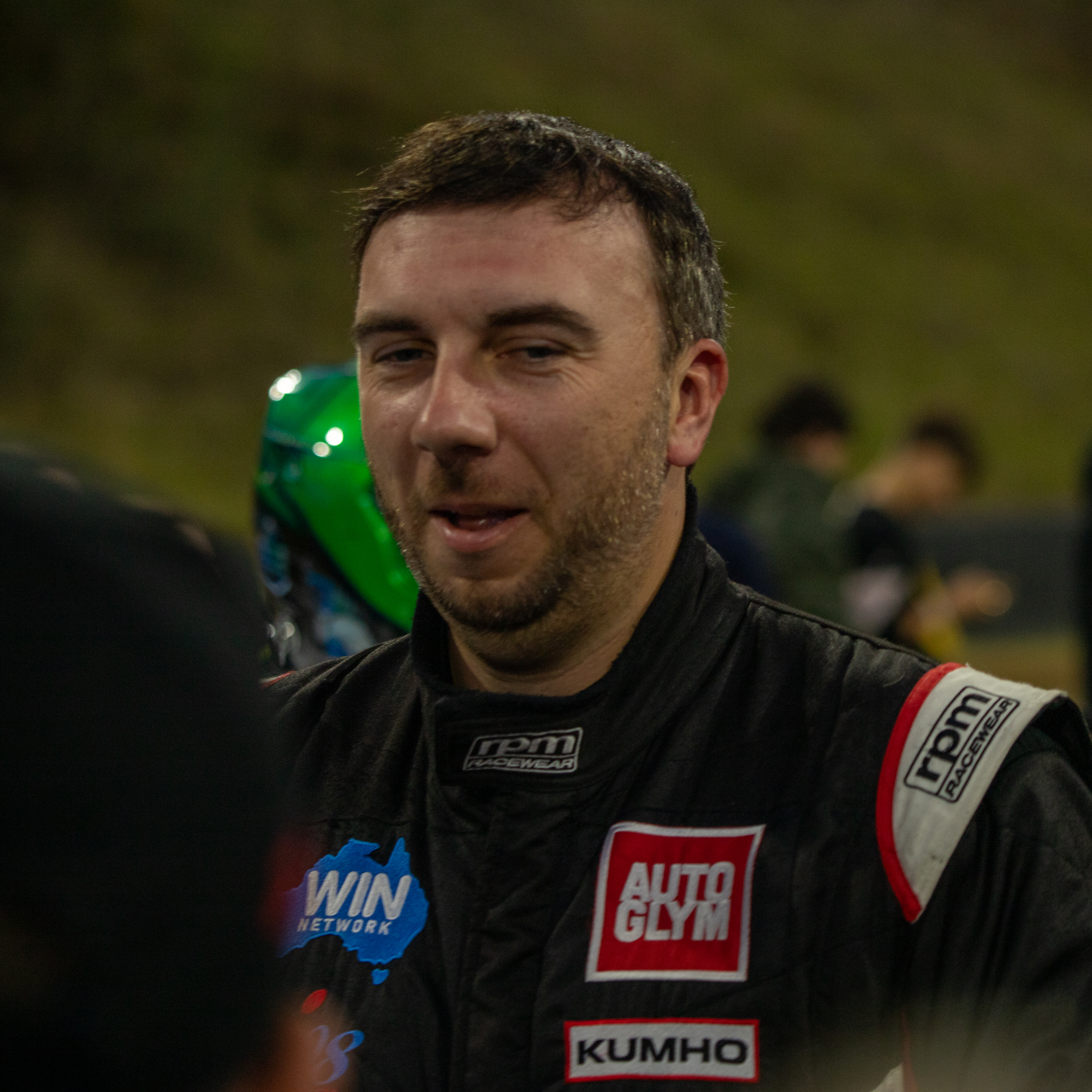
- Oliphant in 2023
- Nationality: British
- Born: Thomas Christy Oliphant; 21 August 1990 (age 36) Tarporley, Cheshire

TCR Australia career
- Debut season: 2023
- Current team: HMO Customer Racing
- Car number: 15
- Starts: 36
- Wins: 2
- Podiums: 3
- Poles: 0
- Fastest laps: 4
- Best finish: 8th in 2023

Previous series
- 2018-2022 2016-18 2016-17 2014-15 2013-15 2012-13: British Touring Car Championship; Porsche GT3 Middle East Championship; Porsche Carrera Cup Great Britain; British GT Championship; Ginetta GT4 Supercup; BARC Formula Renault

Championship titles
- 2015: Ginetta GT4 Supercup

Thomas Christy Oliphant (born 21 August 1990 in Tarporley, Cheshire) is a British racing driver.

Oliphant currently competes in TCR Australia for HMO Customer Racing.

Oliphant won the 2015 Ginetta GT4 Supercup title, is a two-time race winner in the British Touring Car Championship, has taken podium finishes in the Porsche Carrera Cup Great Britain and was a title contender in the Porsche GT3 Cup Challenge Middle East.

== Racing record ==
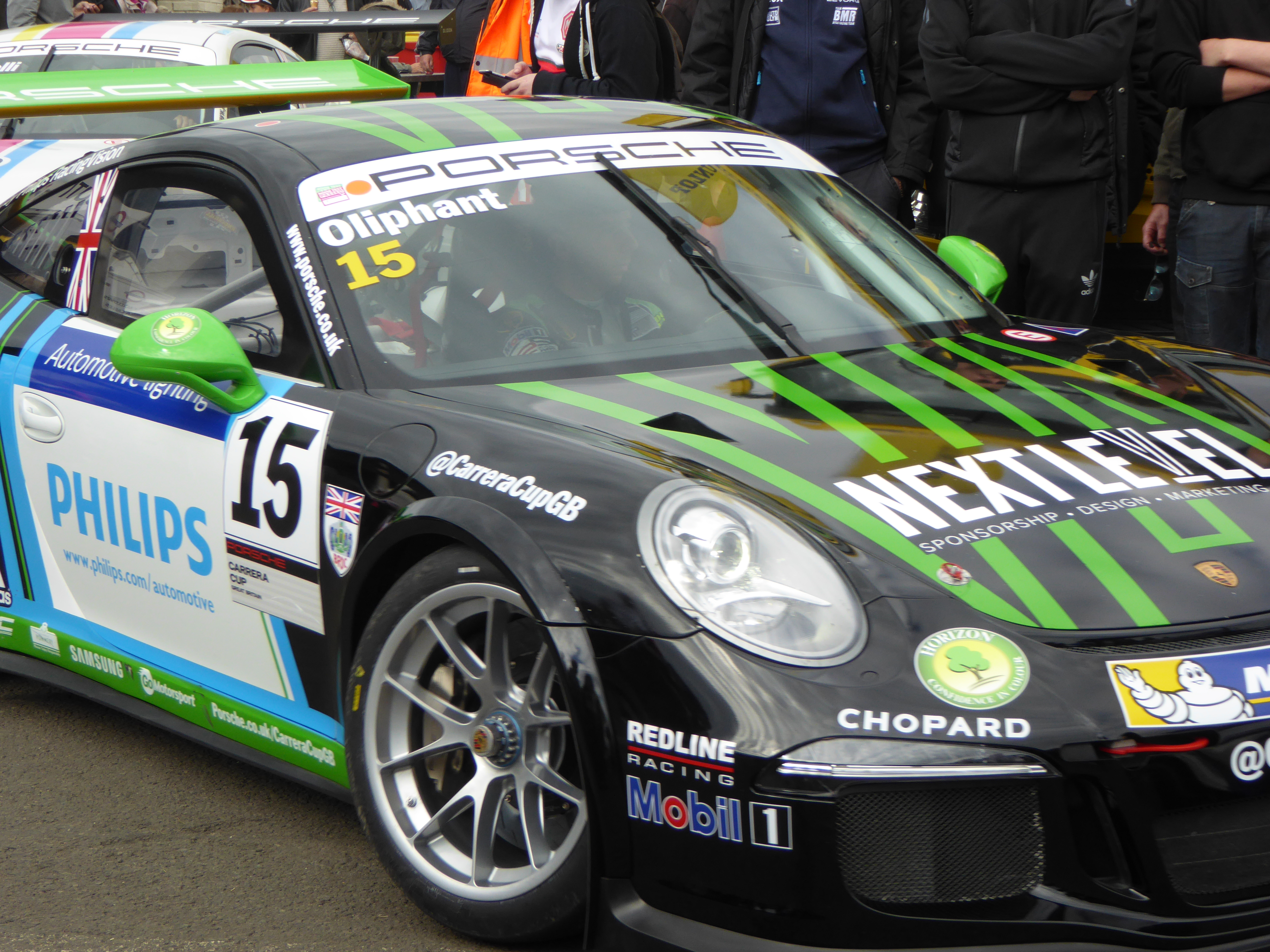
Oliphant, at the Knockhill round of the 2017 Porsche Carrera Cup Great Britain.

=== Career summary ===
Season	Series	Team	Races	Wins	Poles	F/Laps	Podiums	Points	Position
2012	Formula Renault BARC	Antel Motorsport	14	0	0	0	0	73	16th
2013	Formula Renault BARC	MGR Motorsport	14	0	0	0	0	135	13th
2013	Ginetta GT Supercup	Century Motorsport	4	0	0	0	0	32	21st
2014	Ginetta GT4 Supercup	Century Motorsport	27	2	0	0	10	546	5th
2014	British GT Championship - GT4	Century Motorsport	10	1	2	0	4	121.5	4th
2015	Ginetta GT4 Supercup	Century Motorsport	27	8	4	10	21	740	1st
2015	British GT Championship	Team LNT	6	0	0	0	0	2	24th
2015	24H Series - SP3	Speedworks Motorsport							
2016	Porsche Carrera Cup GB	Redline Racing	16	0	0	0	1	199	4th
2016	Porsche Supercup	Redline Racing	1	0	0	0	0	0	NC†
2016	24H Series - SP3	Century Motorsport							
2016-17	Porsche GT3 Middle East Championship	Lechner Racing Middle East	12	0	0	0	6	198	4th
2017	Porsche Carrera Cup GB	Redline Racing	15	0	0	0	3	182	4th
2017	Porsche Supercup	Lechner Racing Middle East	3	0	0	0	0	0	NC†
2017-18	Porsche GT3 Middle East Championship	Lechner Racing Middle East	8	4	TBC	TBC	8	192	
2018	British Touring Car Championship	Ciceley Motorsport	30	0	0	1	0	63	22nd
2019	British Touring Car Championship	Team BMW	30	0	0	3	2	178	11th
2020	British Touring Car Championship	Team BMW	27	1	0	0	4	228	6th
2021	British Touring Car Championship	Team BMW	29	1	0	0	4	129	16th
2022	British Touring Car Championship	Autobrite Direct with JourneyHero	3	0	0	0	0	0	30th
2023	TCR Australia Touring Car Series	Ashley Seward Motorsport	18	1	0	0	1	564	8th
2023	TCR World Tour	Ashley Seward Motorsport	6	0	0	0	0	23	23rd
2024	TCR Australia Touring Car Series	HMO Customer Racing	21	1	1	4	4	536	8th

^{†} As Oliphant was a guest driver, he was ineligible to score points. ^{*} Season still in progress.

=== Complete British GT Championship results ===
(key) (Races in bold indicate pole position) (Races in italics indicate fastest lap)

Year	Team	Car	Class	1	2	3	4	5	6	7	8	9	10	DC	Points
2014	Century Motorsport	Ginetta G55 GT4	GT4	OUL; 1 Ret	OUL; 2 Ret	**ROC**; **1**; 23	**SIL**; **1**; 24	SNE; 1; 20	SNE; 2; 18	SPA; 1; 26	SPA; 2; 25	BRH; 1; 23	DON; 1; 15	4th	121.5
2015	Team LNT	Ginetta G55 GT3	GT3	OUL; 1; 9	OUL; 2 Ret	ROC; 1 Ret	SIL; 1; 11	SPA; 1 Ret	BRH; 1 Ret	SNE; 1	SNE; 2	DON; 1; 13		26th	2

=== Complete British Touring Car Championship results ===
(key) (Races in bold indicate pole position – 1 point awarded just in first race; races in italics indicate fastest lap – 1 point awarded all races; * signifies that driver led race for at least one lap – 1 point given all races)

Year	Team	Car	1	2	3	4	5	6	7	8	9	10	11	12	13	14	15	16	17	18	19	20	21	22	23	24	25	26	27	28	29	30	DC	Points
2018	Ciceley Motorsport	Mercedes-Benz A-Class	BRH; 1; 16	BRH; 2 Ret	BRH; 3; 20	DON; 1; 9	DON; 2; 12	DON; 3; 22	THR; 1; 17	THR; 2 Ret	THR; 3; 19	OUL; 1; 20	OUL; 2; 13	OUL; 3 Ret	CRO; 1; 16	CRO; 2; 13	CRO; 3; 14	SNE; 1; 8	SNE; 2; 8	SNE; 3 Ret	ROC; 1; 25	ROC; 2; 17	ROC; 3; 13	KNO; 1; 7	KNO; 2 Ret	KNO; 3; 21	SIL; 1; 9	SIL; 2; 11	SIL; 3; 16	BRH; 1; 13	BRH; 2 Ret	BRH; 3; 20	22nd	63
2019	Team BMW	BMW 330i M Sport	BRH; 1; 22	BRH; 2; 15	BRH; 3; 6	DON; 1; 3	DON; 2; 17	DON; 3; 13	THR; 1; 23	THR; 2; 14	THR; 3; 7	CRO; 1; 5	CRO; 2; 18	CRO; 3; 23	OUL; 1; 6	OUL; 2; 4	OUL; 3; 2	SNE; 1; 16	SNE; 2; 11	SNE; 3 Ret	THR; 1; 5	THR; 2; 4	THR; 3; 7	KNO; 1; 15	KNO; 2; 14	KNO; 3; 13	SIL; 1; 5	SIL; 2; 7*	SIL; 3; 4	BRH; 1; 16	BRH; 2 Ret	BRH; 3; 10	11th	178
2020	Team BMW	BMW 330i M Sport	DON; 1; 6	DON; 2; 3	DON; 3; 9	BRH; 1; 8	BRH; 2; 7	BRH; 3; 1*	OUL; 1; 12	OUL; 2; 6	OUL; 3; 3	KNO; 1; 8	KNO; 2; 6	KNO; 3; 4	THR; 1; 8	THR; 2; 6	THR; 3; 6	SIL; 1 Ret	SIL; 2; 9	SIL; 3; 2*	CRO; 1; 11	CRO; 2; 7	CRO; 3; 6	SNE; 1; 14	SNE; 2; 11	SNE; 3; 12	BRH; 1; 10	BRH; 2; 15	BRH; 3; 13				6th	228
2021	Team BMW	BMW 330i M Sport	THR; 1; 15	THR; 2; 10	THR; 3; 7	SNE; 1; 8	SNE; 2; 6	SNE; 3; 16	BRH; 1; 1*	**BRH**; **2**; 3*	BRH; 3; 15	OUL; 1 Ret	OUL; 2 DNS	OUL; 3; 14	KNO; 1 Ret	KNO; 2; 17	KNO; 3; 14	THR; 1; 3	THR; 2; 3	THR; 3; 12	CRO; 1; 20	CRO; 2 Ret	CRO; 3; 13	SIL; 1; 11	SIL; 2; 21	SIL; 3; 11	DON; 1; 16	DON; 2; 24	DON; 3; 20	BRH; 1; 11	BRH; 2 Ret	BRH; 3; 15	16th	129
2022	Autobrite Direct with JourneyHero	CUPRA León	DON; 1	DON; 2	DON; 3	BRH; 1	BRH; 2	BRH; 3	THR; 1	THR; 2	THR; 3	OUL; 1	OUL; 2	OUL; 3	CRO; 1	CRO; 2	CRO; 3	KNO; 1	KNO; 2	KNO; 3	SNE; 1	SNE; 2	SNE; 3	THR; 1; 24	THR; 2; 24	THR; 3; 20	SIL; 1	SIL; 2	SIL; 3	BRH; 1	BRH; 2	BRH; 3	30th	0

=== Complete TCR World Tour results ===
(key) (Races in bold indicate pole position) (Races in italics indicate fastest lap)

Year	Team	Car	1	2	3	4	5	6	7	8	9	10	11	12	13	14	15	16	17	18	19	20	DC	Points
2023	Ashley Seward Motorsport	Lynk & Co 03 TCR	ALG; 1	ALG; 2	SPA; 1	SPA; 2	VAL; 1	VAL; 2	HUN; 1	HUN; 2	ELP; 1	ELP; 2	VIL; 1	VIL; 2	SYD; 1; 12	SYD; 2; 7	SYD; 3; 13	BAT; 1; 17	BAT; 2; 16	BAT; 3; 14	MAC; 1	MAC; 2	23rd	23
