= Stuart Boardley =

English footballer and manager

Personal information
- Full name: Stuart James Boardley
- Date of birth: 14 February 1985 (age 41)
- Place of birth: Ipswich, England
- Position: Midfielder

Team information
- Current team: Felixstowe & Walton United (manager)

Youth career
- –2004: Ipswich Town

Senior career*
Years	Team	Apps	(Gls)
2004–2005	Torquay United	14	(0)
2005	Long Melford	25	(10)
2005–2007	Leiston	80	(20)
2007–2008	AFC Sudbury	31	(7)
2008–2017	Leiston		
2017–2018	Felixstowe & Walton United		

Managerial career
- 2018–2019: Leiston
- 2019–: Felixstowe & Walton United
- * Club domestic league appearances and goals as of 2008-01-26

Stuart James Boardley (born 14 February 1985) is an English former professional footballer. He played professionally for Torquay United and was most recently manager of Felixstowe & Walton United whom he guided to Suffolk Premier Cup success in April 2025.

== Personal life ==
Boardley was born in Ipswich and is the younger brother of the four time Hot Rods (oval racing) World Champion Carl Boardley. Boardley attended Northgate High School in Ipswich and left school with GCSEs and A-Levels to pursue a career in football. He recently married his childhood sweetheart Gemma Smith.

== Playing career ==
Boardley, a midfielder, began his career as a trainee with Ipswich Town. His traineeship was extended due to injuries received in a car crash, but he was released in May 2004 without playing in the first team. Leroy Rosenior took him to Torquay United in August 2004 and he signed a contract the following month. He made his Torquay debut on 28 September in the 4–3 win at home to Yeovil Town in the Football League Trophy. and shortly afterwards signed a contract. His league debut came on 2 October, in a 1–1 draw away to Peterborough United. He played many more times in the league for Torquay, and once in the FA Cup (a 2–0 defeat away to non-league Hinckley United), before being released in May 2005 following Torquay's relegation.

In the 2005 close-season he joined non-League side Long Melford, but chose to leave in November 2005, moving to Leiston, managed by former Ipswich Town and Tottenham Hotspur player Jason Dozzell, later the same month.

In June 2007, a fee was agreed which saw Boardley move to Isthmian League promotion chasers AFC Sudbury. Following the managerial resignation of Mark Morsley he rejoined Leiston for a second spell in June 2008.

In October 2008, Boardley scored twice as Leiston beat Conference National side Lewes in the Fourth Qualifying Round of the FA Cup, ensuring a place in the First Round proper for Leiston for the first time in their history. At that time he was reported to be working as a quantity surveyor in Ipswich for Brooks and Wood Ltd. He joined Felixstowe & Walton United in 2017.

== Managerial career ==
In October 2018 Boardley announced his retirement from playing football. Later in the same week he was appointed manager of Leiston, having previously been assistant to Richard Wilkins at the club during his second playing spell at the club.

He left Leiston in September 2019, and was appointed manager of Felixstowe & Walton United in October.
