= Will Burns (racing driver) =

British racing driver (born 1990)

- Nationality: (United Kingdom) British
- Born: 24 June 1990 (age 36) Weston-Super-Mare, Somerset

British GT Championship career
- Debut season: 2018
- Current team: Rob Boston Racing
- Car number: 41
- Former teams: Century Motorsport
- Starts: 28
- Wins: 4
- Poles: 2
- Fastest laps: 1

Previous series
- 2017 2013–16 2011–13: British Touring Car Championship; Ginetta GT4 Supercup; Ginetta Challenge

Will Burns (born 24 June 1990 in Weston-Super-Mare) is a British racing driver, currently competing in the British GT series with Century Motorsports.

== Racing career ==
=== Early career ===
Burns began his car racing career in 2011 running in the Ginetta Challenge. He spent three seasons in the series finishing the 2013 season as the runner-up. Near the end of the 2013 season, he joined the BTCC supporting Ginetta GT Supercup running in the secondary G50 class for seven races with Academy Motorsport.

Burns moved up to the primary class in the Ginetta GT Supercup for 2014 remaining with Academy Motorsport, he completed his first full season seventh in points. The following season, he moved to HHC Motorsport and finished fifth. In 2016, he moved to Douglas Motorsport where he finally took his first wins in the series and narrowly lost the championship to Tom Wrigley.

=== British Touring Car Championship ===
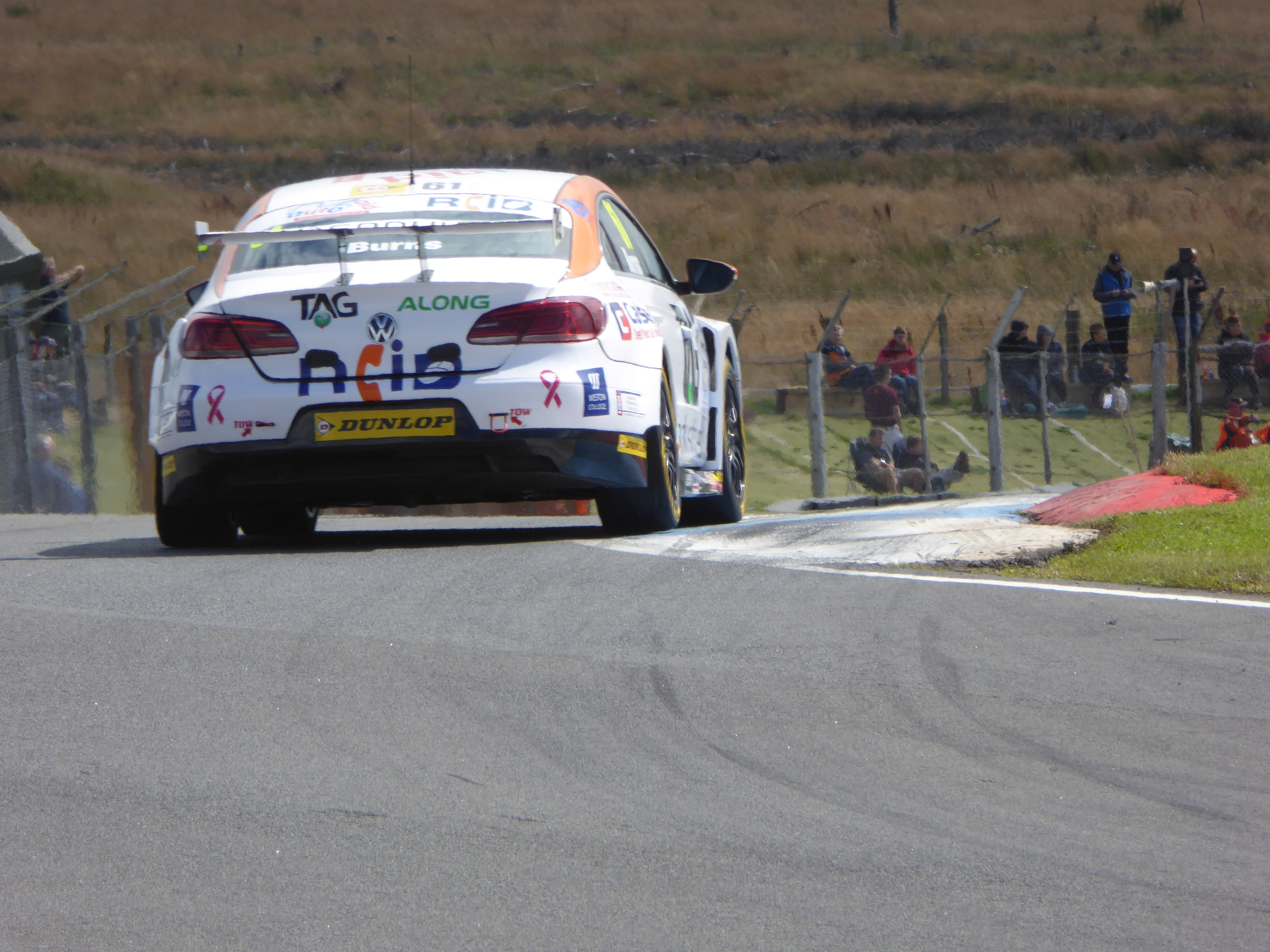
Burns, at the Knockhill round of the 2017 British Touring Car Championship.

For the 2017 season, Burns was signed by Tony Gilham Racing to compete in the British Touring Car Championship. His teammates were Jake Hill and Michael Epps.

=== British GT Championship ===
For 2018, Burns signed for the Yorkshire based racing team HHC Motorsport, alongside Mike Newbould. They would be competing in a Ginetta G55 GT4.

== Racing record ==
=== Complete British Touring Car Championship results ===
(key) (Races in bold indicate pole position – 1 point awarded just in first race; races in italics indicate fastest lap – 1 point awarded all races; * signifies that driver led race for at least one lap – 1 point given all races)

Year	Team	Car	1	2	3	4	5	6	7	8	9	10	11	12	13	14	15	16	17	18	19	20	21	22	23	24	25	26	27	28	29	30	DC	Pts
2017	Autoaid RCIB Insurance Racing	Volkswagen CC	BRH; 1; 26	BRH; 2; 22	BRH; 3; 28	DON; 1; 22	DON; 2; 27	DON; 3 Ret	THR; 1; 26	THR; 2; 19	THR; 3; 23	OUL; 1; 25	OUL; 2; 29	OUL; 3; 22	CRO; 1; 17	CRO; 2 Ret	CRO; 3 Ret	SNE; 1; 16	SNE; 2; 16	SNE; 3; 18	KNO; 1; 29	KNO; 2; 20	KNO; 3 Ret	ROC; 1; 23	ROC; 2; 21	ROC; 3 Ret	SIL; 1 Ret	SIL; 2 DNS	SIL; 3 DNS	BRH; 1	BRH; 2	BRH; 3	35th	0

=== Complete British GT Championship results ===
(key) (Races in bold indicate pole position) (Races in italics indicate fastest lap)

Year	Team	Car	Class	1	2	3	4	5	6	7	8	9	DC	Points
2018	HHC Motorsport	Ginetta G55 GT4	GT4	OUL; 1; 34	OUL; 2; 14	ROC; 1; 26	SNE; 1; 29	SNE; 2; 29	SIL; 1; 21	SPA; 1; 21	BRH; 1 DSQ	DON; 1	16th	28.5
2021	Century Motorsport	BMW M4 GT4	GT4	**BRH**; **1**; 13	SIL; 1; 17	DON; 1; 8	**SPA**; **1**; 8	SNE; 1; 11	SNE; 2; 14	OUL; 1; 12	OUL; 2; 9	DON; 1; 15	1st	209
2022	Century Motorsport	BMW M4 GT4	GT4	OUL; 1; 21	OUL; 2; 16	SIL; 1; 19	DON; 1; 19	SNE; 1; 25	SNE; 2; 16	SPA; 1; 22	BRH; 1; 19	DON; 1; 20	6th	107
2025	Rob Boston Racing	Porsche 718 Cayman GT4 RS Clubsport	GT4	DON; 1; 18	SIL; 1; 22	OUL; 1	OUL; 2	SPA; 1 WD	SNE; 1	SNE; 2	BRH; 1	DON; 1	13th	27

Sporting positions
Preceded by Jamie Caroline; Daniel Vaughan	British GT Championship; GT4 Champion; 2021; With: Gus Burton	Succeeded by Sennan Fielding; Richard Williams
Preceded by Jamie Caroline; Daniel Vaughan	British GT Championship; GT4 Silver Champion; 2021; With: Gus Burton	Succeeded by Sennan Fielding; Richard Williams
