= Tom Wrigley =

British racing driver (born 1992)

- Nationality: British
- Born: 13 August 1992 (age 34) Chirk, Denbighshire, U.K.

British GT career
- Debut season: 2023
- Current team: Century Motorsport
- Car number: 29
- Former teams: RACE-LAB
- Starts: 17
- Wins: 3
- Podiums: 5
- Poles: 0
- Best finish: 3rd in 2023

Previous series
- 2014 2014-16 2016 2017-2019: Kumho BMW Championship; Ginetta GT4 Supercup; Supercar Challenge; Porsche Carrera Cup GB

Championship titles
- 2014 2016: Kumho BMW Championship; Ginetta GT4 Supercup

Tom Wrigley (born 13 August 1992) is a British racing driver who last raced a BMW M4 GT4 for Century Motorsport in the British GT Championship in 2024. He operates a BMW performance business, Tom Wrigley Performance.

== Career ==
=== Racing ===
==== Early career and GT4 / Ginetta series ====
Wrigley first came to wider attention in 2014, winning the Kumho BMW Championship. He then also competed in the Ginetta GT4 Supercup in 2014, 2015 and 2016.

Wrigley's 2016 season was particularly successful: driving for Rob Boston Racing, he won the Ginetta GT4 Supercup title. He achieved nine wins, multiple podiums, several fastest laps and poles. Noteworthy achievements in 2016 were his performance at Knockhill, where he secured a hat-trick of victories, setting a new lap record in one of the races en route to his title.

=== Le Mans prototype debut ===
In 2016, Wrigley made his debut in a prototype at Le Mans: specifically, the V de V Championship Four Hours of Le Mans, driving a Ginetta G57 prototype for Team LNT, alongside Bradley Ellis and Andrew Cummings. In that race, they qualified fourth overall around the Bugatti Circuit at Le Mans. During the first two hours, they were in contention for a podium; however, a gearbox problem dropped them back, and they finished ninth overall and second among the G57 prototypes on track.

=== Porsche Carrera Cup GB ===
After his success in GT4 with Ginetta, Wrigley progressed to Porsche Carrera Cup Great Britain in 2017 with the In2Racing team. In 2018, racing for JTR, he achieved third place in the championship standings. During that season, he also notched several wins.

=== British GT Championship ===
Wrigley returned to full-season motorsport in British GT in 2023, racing in the GT4 class, and partnering with Ian Gough in RACE LAB. He secured two class wins in that season, and finished third in the GT4 standings overall. For 2024, Wrigley again teamed with Ian Gough, this time with Century Motorsport, driving a BMW M4 in the GT4 Pro/Am category.

== Racing record ==
According to DriverDB, Wrigley has started over 120 races, with 21 wins and 47 podiums in those appearances as of late 2024. He has also achieved several fastest laps and pole positions.

=== Career summary ===
Season	Series	Team	Races	Wins	Poles	F/Laps	Podiums	Points	Position
2014	Kumho BMW Championship	TWR	?	?	?	?	?	?	1st
2014	Ginetta GT4 Supercup	TWR	3	0	0	0	0	33	21st
2015	Ginetta GT4 Supercup	TWR	27	2	1	1	2	429	6th
2016	Ginetta GT4 Supercup	Rob Boston Racing	23	9	4	9	16	604	1st
2016	Supercar Challenge	IN2 Racing	2	0	0	1	0	15	22nd
2017	Porsche Carrera Cup GB	IN2 Racing	15	0	0	0	1	92	9th
2018	Porsche Carrera Cup GB	JTR	16	4	1	0	8	108	3rd
2019	Porsche Carrera Cup GB	Rob Boston Racing	2	0	0	0	0	N/A	N/A
2023	British GT Championship - GT4	RACE-LAB	9	2	0	0	3	117.5	3rd
2024	British GT Championship - GT4	Century Motorsport	8	1	0	0	2	75	5th
