= Ginetta GT4 Supercup =

- Category: One-make racing by Ginetta
- Country: United Kingdom
- Inaugural season: 2008
- Folded: 2022
- Constructors: Ginetta
- Engine suppliers: Ford Duratec 3.7 litre V6
- Last Drivers' champion: (United Kingdom) Adam Smalley
- Official website: Ginetta GT4 Supercup Website

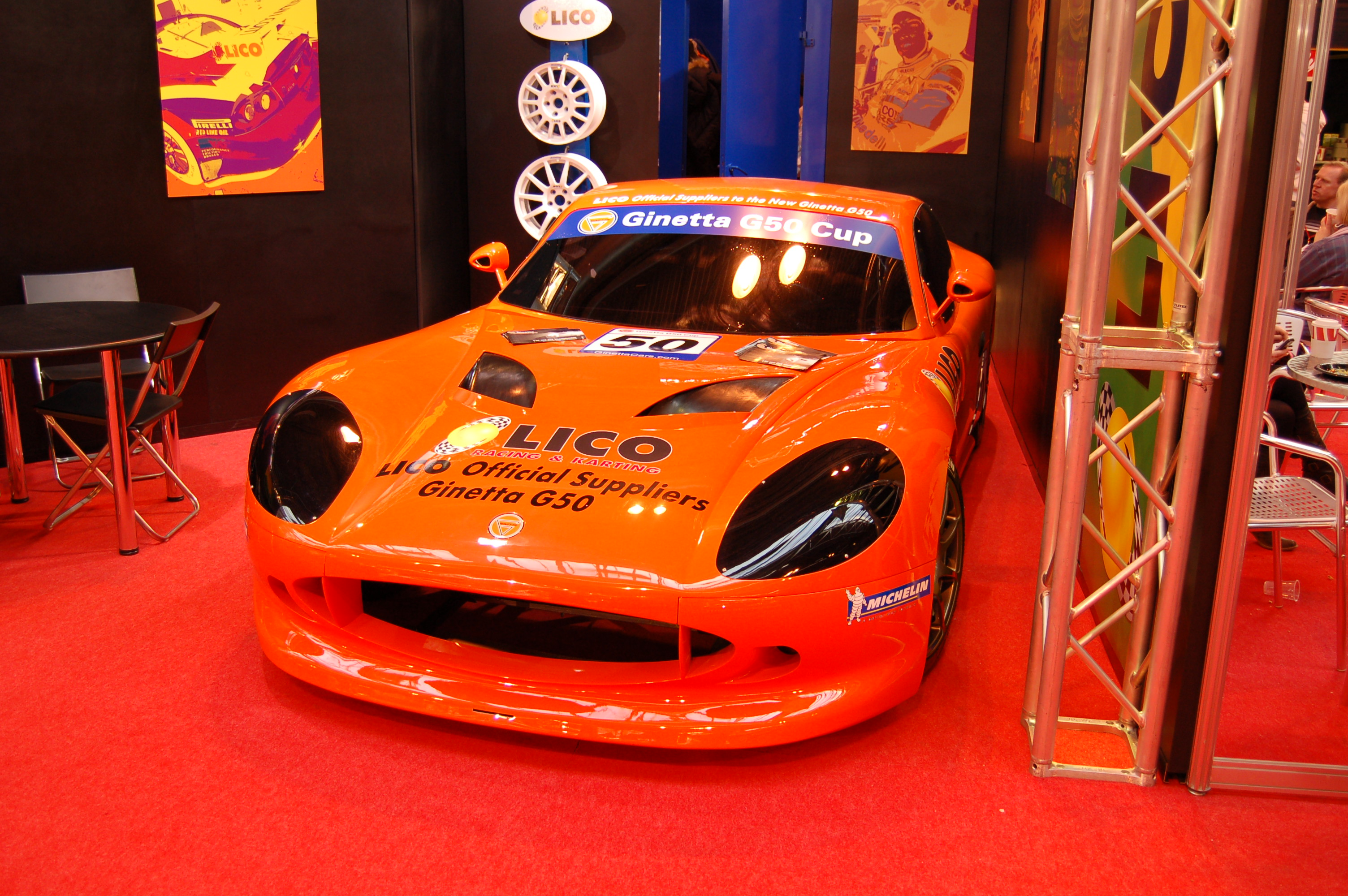
The Ginetta G50 Cup car.

The Ginetta GT4 Supercup was a one-make racing, Sports car racing series based in the United Kingdom, using identical Ginetta G50 and G55 sports cars. The championship supported the British Touring Car Championship (BTCC) until the end of the 2022 season, then became a class in the British Endurance Championship run by Britcar.

The championship began as the Ginetta G50 Cup in 2008, supporting the British Formula Three Championship and British GT Championship. In 2009 it moved to support the BTCC. In 2011, with the introduction of the Ginetta G55, the championship became the Ginetta GT Supercup, running a multi class format for the two different cars. For the 2014 season, the championship was rebranded as the Ginetta GT4 Supercup, with both the G50 and G55 cars running in a single, performance balanced class.

== Racing car ==
The regulations include sealed engines, gearboxes and differentials. This prevents expensive development of the cars and ensures that all of the cars are identical, helping to provide close racing.

The Ginetta G55 Cup was introduced in 2011, the Ginetta G55 offered a 3.7 litre V6 engine and 380 BHP.

Trained engineer Tomlinson himself penned the base specification for the Ginetta G50 which was produced to celebrate 50 years of Ginetta production. Home to a 3.5 litre V6 engine and 300 BHP, it has since become a successful GT4 car.

== Race weekend ==
Meetings are usually made up of three 20-minute races. The grid for the first race is determined by a 20-minute qualifying session. The results of the first race forms the grid for the second race. The grid for the third race is decided by reversing between 4 and 6 of the top 10 finishers from the second race.

== Race Circuits ==
The racing circuits used in the series were:

- Brands Hatch (Indy), Kent
- Donington Park (national), Leicestershire
- Croft, North Yorkshire
- Oulton Park (International), Cheshire
- Thruxton, Hampshire
- Knockhill, Fife
- Silverstone (National), Northamptonshire
- Brands Hatch (Grand Prix), Kent

== Champions ==
Ginetta G50 Cup
Season		G50 Champion	G50 Team	
2008		(United Kingdom) Nigel Moore	(United Kingdom) Tockwith Motorsport	
2009		(United Kingdom) Nathan Freke	(United Kingdom) Century Motorsport	
2010		(United Kingdom) Frank Wrathall	(United Kingdom) Dynojet	
Ginetta GT Supercup
Season	G55 Champion	G55 Team Champion	G50 Champion	G50 Team Champion
2011	(United Kingdom) Adam Morgan	(United Kingdom) Ciceley Racing	(United Kingdom) Tom Ingram	(United Kingdom) Plans Motorsport
2012	(United Kingdom) Carl Breeze	(United Kingdom) TCR	(United Kingdom) Mark Davies	(United Kingdom) Richardson Racing
2013	(United Kingdom) Tom Ingram	(United Kingdom) JHR Developments	(United Kingdom) Sean Huyton	(United Kingdom) Academy Motorsport
2014	(United Kingdom) Charlie Robertson	(United Kingdom) HHC Motorsport		
Ginetta GT4 Supercup
Season	Pro Champion	Pro Team Champion	Am Champion	Am Team Champion
2015	(United Kingdom) Tom Oliphant	(United Kingdom) Century Motorsport	(United Kingdom) Colin White	(United Kingdom) CWS 4x4 Spares
2016	(United Kingdom) Tom Wrigley	(United Kingdom) Rob Boston Racing	(United Kingdom) Colin White	(United Kingdom) CWS 4x4 Spares
2017	(United Kingdom) Callum Pointon	(United Kingdom) HHC Motorsport	(United Kingdom) Jac Constable	(United Kingdom) Xentek Motorsport
2018	(United Kingdom) Charlie Ladell	(United Kingdom) Rob Boston Racing	(United Kingdom) Michael Crees	(United Kingdom) Century Motorsport
2019	(United Kingdom) Harry King	(United Kingdom) Elite Motorsport	(United Kingdom) Nathan Heathcote	(United Kingdom) Century Motorsport
2020	(United Kingdom) Will Burns	(United Kingdom) Rob Boston Racing	(United Kingdom) Colin White	(United Kingdom) CWS 4x4 Spares
2021	(United Kingdom) Adam Smalley	(United Kingdom) Elite Motorsport	(United Kingdom) Colin White	(United Kingdom) CWS 4x4 Spares
Season	G56 Pro	G56 Am	G55 Pro	G55 Am
2022	(United Kingdom) James Kellett	(United Kingdom) Wes Pearce	(United Kingdom) Luke Reade	(United Kingdom) Ian Duggan

== See also ==
- Ginetta Junior Championship
