= Jac Constable =

British racing driver (born 1997)

- Nationality: (United Kingdom) British
- Born: 6 December 1997 (age 28) Fleet, United Kingdom

TCR UK career
- Debut season: 2021
- Current team: Power Maxed Racing
- Categorisation: FIA Silver
- Car number: 11
- Starts: 13 (14 entries)
- Wins: 2
- Poles: 0
- Best finish: 6th in 2021

Previous series
- 2019, 2020 2020 2019 2018 2017, 2018 2016: Radical Challenge Championship; British Touring Car Championship; VLN Series; 24H TCE Series; Ginetta GT4 Supercup; Ginetta GT5 Challenge

Championship titles
- 2017: Ginetta GT4 Supercup AM

Jac Constable (born 6 December 1997 in Fleet, Hampshire) is a British racing driver who currently competes in TCR UK and serves as a BTCC development driver, both for Power Maxed Racing. Constable made his British Touring Car Championship debut at Croft in 2020, however he withdrew after qualifying due to appendicitis.

== Career ==
=== Karting ===
Born and raised in Fleet, Hampshire, Constable began karting in 2011 at the Trent Valley and the Shenington kart clubs, competing against drivers such as Formula 1 star Lando Norris, Formula 2 drivers Guanyu Zhou and Jack Aitken and two-time W Series champion Jamie Chadwick. During his five year karting campaign, he would achieve respectable results such as third place in the 2012 Kartmasters British Grand Prix, beating rival Lando Norris.

=== Ginetta GT5 Challenge ===
Constable would make his car racing debut in the 2016 Ginetta GT5 Challenge, competing with Xentek Motorsport. During this season, he would finish tenth in the standings, with two podiums to his name.

=== Ginetta GT4 Supercup ===
In 2017, Constable would step up to the Ginetta GT4 Supercup, racing in the amateur class again with Xentek Motorsport. Picking up 13 in-class victories and 18 podiums, he would win the title, beating rival Colin White by five points.

For the following year, Constable would step up to the Pro class, finishing in sixth position overall with two podiums.

=== British Touring Car Championship ===
On 30 September 2020, it was announced that Constable would make his British Touring Car Championship debut at Croft, driving for Power Maxed Car Care Racing. After finishing in 21st out of 26 competitors in qualifying, Constable would withdraw prior to the races due to appendicitis.

Constable currently serves as a development driver for Power Maxed Racing.

=== TCR UK ===
Constable made his TCR UK debut in 2021, driving for Power Maxed Racing. He finished sixth in the standings, with two wins and four podiums. He continued in the championship in 2022.

== Karting Record ==
=== Karting career summary ===
Season	Series	Team	Position
2011	Trent Valley Kart Club - Minimax		18th
2011	Shenington Kart Club - Rotax Minimax		3rd
2012	Trent Valley Kart Club - Minimax		12th
2012	Trent Valley Kart Club - Junior Rotax		28th
2012	Kartmasters British Grand Prix - Rotax Minimax	Protenza Motorsport	3rd
2012	Formula Kart Stars - Minimax		7th
2013	Super 1 National Rotax Max Junior		17th
2013	Kartmasters British Grand Prix - Rotax Junior		14th
2014	Rotax Max Wintercup - Rotax Max Senior		7th
2014	Kartmasters British Grand Prix - Rotax Max		5th
2015	British Open Championship - Rotax Max Senior		9th
2015	Super 1 National Rotax Max Championship		11th

== Racing record ==
=== Racing career summary ===
Season	Series	Team	Races	Wins	Poles	F/Laps	Podiums	Points	Position
2016	Ginetta GT5 Challenge	Xentek Motorsport	19	0	0	0	2	42	10th
2017	Ginetta GT4 Supercup - AM	Xentek Motorsport	23	13	6	14	18	649	1st
2018	Ginetta GT4 Supercup - Pro	Fix Auto Racing	23	0	0	2	2	378	6th
2018	24H TCE Series - Championship of the Continents - SP3	CWS Engineering	1	1	0	0	1	N/A	N/A
2019	Radical Challenge Championship - Solo Challenge	Hart GT	21	4	1	1	12	1020	3rd
2019	VLN Series - Cup3 Class	KKrämer Racing	2	0	0	0	0	7.15	31st
2019	VLN Series - V4 Class	KKrämer Racing	1	0	0	0	0	6.58	94th
2020	Radical Challenge Championship - Solo Challenge	Hart GT	6	1	0	0	2	156	15th
2020	British Touring Car Championship	Power Maxed Car Care Racing	0	0	0	0	0	0	34th
2021	Touring Car Trophy	Power Maxed Racing	13	2	0	3	4	186	6th
2022	TCR UK Touring Car Championship	Power Maxed Racing	15	2	0	1	4	296	5th
2023	TCR UK Touring Car Championship	Rob Boston Racing	15	2	1	1	5	337	4th
2026	TCR UK Touring Car Championship	JH Racing							
2026	TCR Europe Touring Car Series	JH Racing	2	0	0	0	0	1	34th

^{*} Season still in progress.

=== Complete Ginetta GT4 Supercup results ===
(key) (Races in bold indicate pole position) (Races in italics indicate fastest lap)

Year	Entrant	1	2	3	4	5	6	7	8	9	10	11	12	13	14	15	16	17	18	19	20	21	22	23	DC	Points
2017	Xentek Motorsport	BHI; 1; 13	BHI; 2 Ret	BHI; 3; 8	DON; 1; **13**	DON; 2; 9	DON; 3; 10	OUL; 1; 11	OUL; 2; 8	CRO; 1; **11**	CRO; 2; **6**	CRO; 3; 8	SNE; 1; **11**	SNE; 2; **11**	SNE; 3; **10**	ROC; 1; **10**	ROC; 2; 12	ROC; 3; **10**	SIL; 1; **11**	SIL; 2; **Ret**	SIL; 3; 10	BHGP; 1; **13**	BHGP; 2; 11	BHGP; 3 Ret	1st - AM	649
2018	Hart GT	BHI; 1; 8	BHI; 2; 4	BHI; 3; 5	DON; 1; 7	DON; 2; 8	DON; 3; 6	OUL; 1; 6	OUL; 2; 14	CRO; 1 Ret	CRO; 2; 5	CRO; 3; 2	SNE; 1; 4	SNE; 2; 2	SNE; 3; 7	ROC; 1; 8	ROC; 2; 10	ROC; 3; 9	SIL; 1; 15	SIL; 2; 16	SIL; 3; 5	BHGP; 1; 5	BHGP; 2; 8	BHGP; 3 Ret	6th - Pro	378
