= Declan Jones =

British racing driver (born 1995)

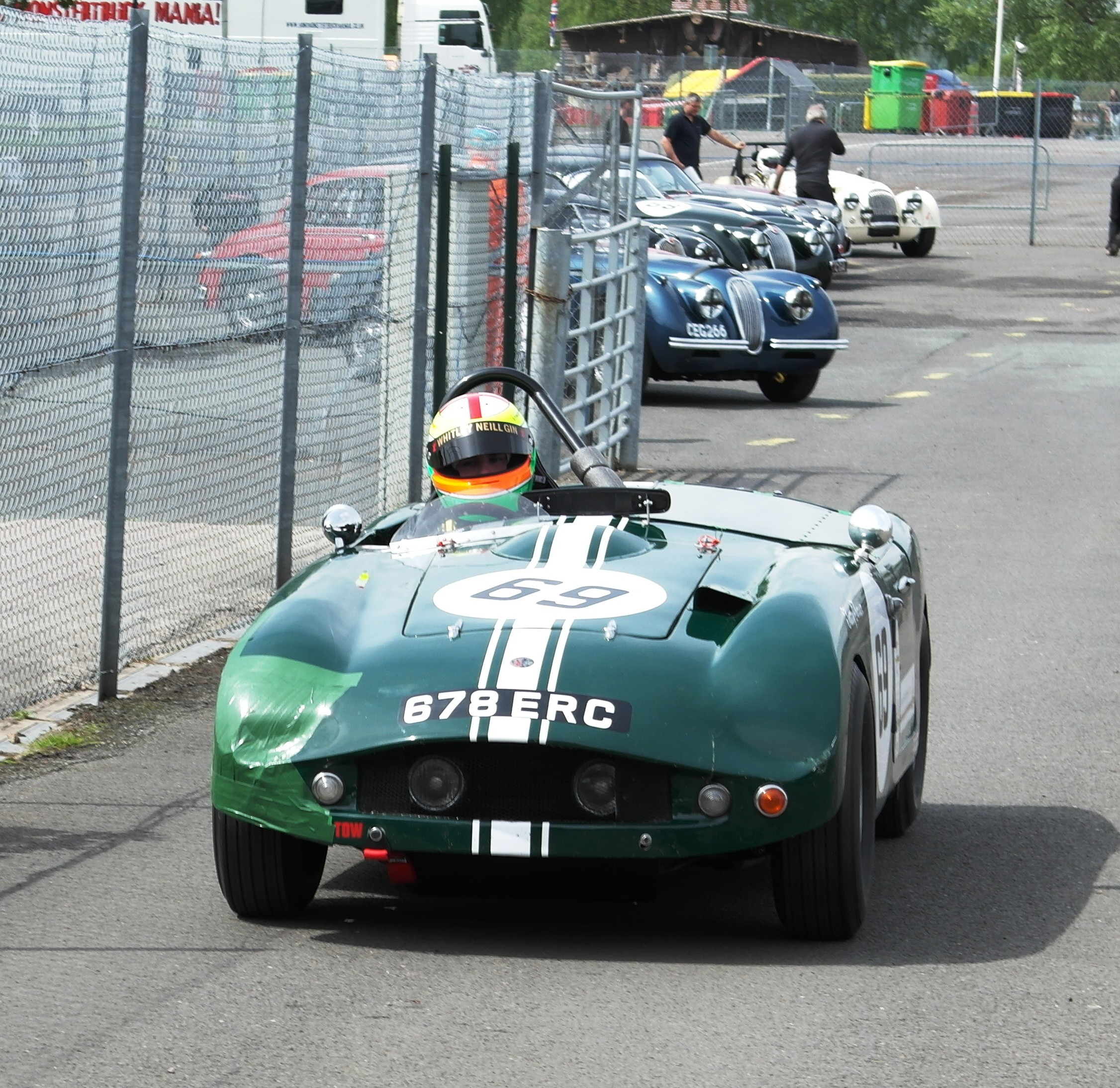
- Declan Jones 2018
- Nationality: British
- Born: 11 May 1995 (age 31) Liverpool, Merseyside, England

Historic Racing career
- Debut season: 2018
- Current team: Declan Jones Racing
- Car number: 69
- Starts: 1
- Championships: 0
- Wins: 1
- Poles: 1
- Fastest laps: 1
- Best finish: 1st in 2018

Previous series
- 2018 2017 2014 2013 2012 2011 2008 2007 2005: Britcar; Ginetta GT4 Supercup 2017; British GT Championship; British GT Championship; VdeV Endurance; Ginetta Super Cup; Ginetta Juniors; Junior Max; Mini Max; Cadet Karts

Championship titles
- 2011 2008 2007: MBKC Series; MBKC Winter Series Champion; Dragon Master; Mini Max Champion (Hooton Park)

Declan Jones (born 11 May 1995) is a British racing driver. In 2018, he competed in Historic Racing, driving for Kelvin Jones Motorsport in the "Tatty Turner"

== Career ==
Jones began his career in karting in 2005.

In 2013, at 17 years of age, Jones became one of the youngest ever winners in the British GT race series. Jones finished second in the 2013 GT4 category.

=== Racing career ===
Jones began Karting in 2005, before later moving into cadet karts, where he won four out of five novice cups available. In 2007, Jones became mini max Hooton Park Champion, and took multiple wins at local club rounds.

In 2008, Jones moved into Junior Max, becoming MBKC winter series champion at 3 sisters, Dragon Master winner at Gyg in Wales and gained third in the Rotax Cup at 3 Sisters. He finished second over all in the MBKC Championship.

In 2009, Jones joined Junior Max. finishing 14th in Formula Kart Stars. The same season, he finished second in the Dragon Master Cup. He also gained multiple club wins around the country.

In 2010, Jones continued in Junior Max and became MBKC winter series winner at 3 Sisters and second overall in the championship as well as Dragon Master Cup winner at Gyg. He also gained multiple wins around the uk. He gained 15th in Super One Championship and joint third in Formula Kart Start Championship. Also that season, he became Cumbria O Plate winner and won the last round of Formula Kart Stars at Ellough Park. The 2010 season also gave Declan a taste of the future in the form of the Ginetta junior scholarship. Getting through to the last 12.

2011 saw the eventual move from karting to the Ginetta Juniors, where he earned multiple top-ten finishes. He ended a successful year in a respectable 13th position in the championship.

In 2012, Jones began racing in the VdeV Endurance Championship. The Dijon 2hr race saw a victory in his class, third in prototypes and sixth overall.

2012 also witnessed Jones enter the Ginetta GT Supercup, the support race to the British Touring Car Championship. First time out at Oulton Park, he put his car on pole by just over seven tenths of a second and finished third on the Sunday race. At Knockhill, Jones finished second and third. At Rockingham, he finished a third and at Silverstone gained a second and first. The last round at Brands Hatch saw Jones gain a 1st and second and third.

In 2013 and 2014, Jones raced in the British GT Championship.

In 2017, Jones raced in the Ginetta GT4 Supercup.

In 2018, Jones drove a Ginetta G55 GT4 with fellow-Ginetta driver Lucky Khera.

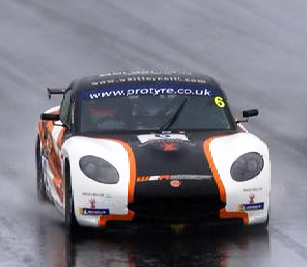
Declan Jones racing at Knockhill in the Ginetta GT5 Challenge

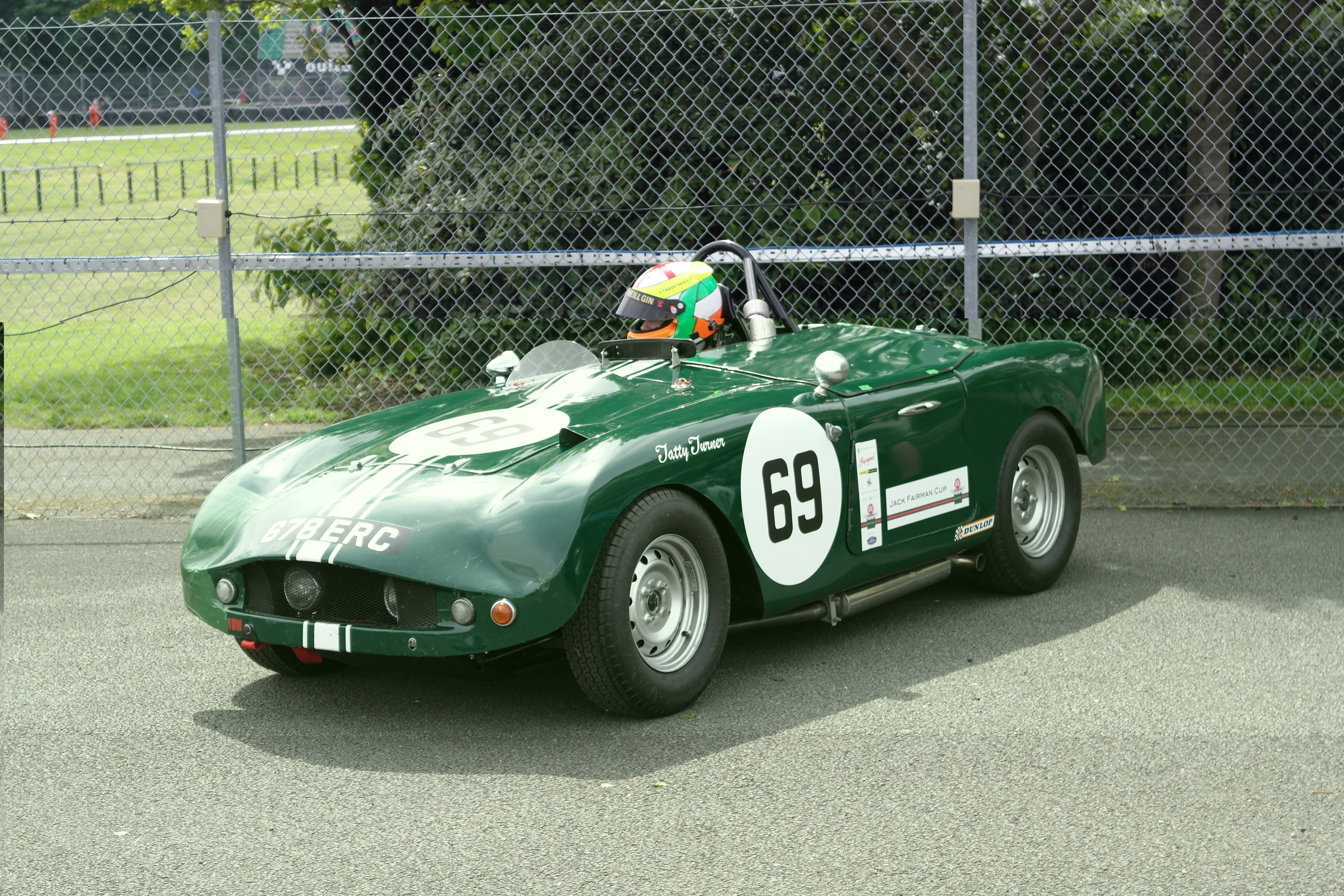
The Tatty Turner

== 2018 Ginetta GT5 Challenge ==
Jones joined W2R Motorsport, with support from Whitley Neill Gin to race in the Ginetta GT5 Challenge races at Knockhill on 26/27 August. He qualified his Ginetta G40 a great third overall on the Saturday morning. Despite being forced onto the grass in the race, he finished in third position.

In the Sunday race, Jones produced a fast start in the torrential rain to grab third straight away, however the red flags were out almost immediately due to a multi-car incident behind. It was déjà vu at the restart though, with another quick launch getting him back into the top three. A brilliant move out of the final hairpin on lap two moved him into second, which he maintained through a safety car period. As the action resumed, Jones pushed hard for the lead but a backmarker blocking him heading into the high-speed chicane led to unfortunate contact.

With his Ginetta G40 receiving damage, Jones was unable to mount a full recovery drive in the limited laps remaining and took the chequered flag in sixth position, a result that capped off a hugely impressive debut in the championship.

== 2018 Historic Racing ==
For 2018, Jones drove the 1960 "Tatty Turner" in Historic Racing.

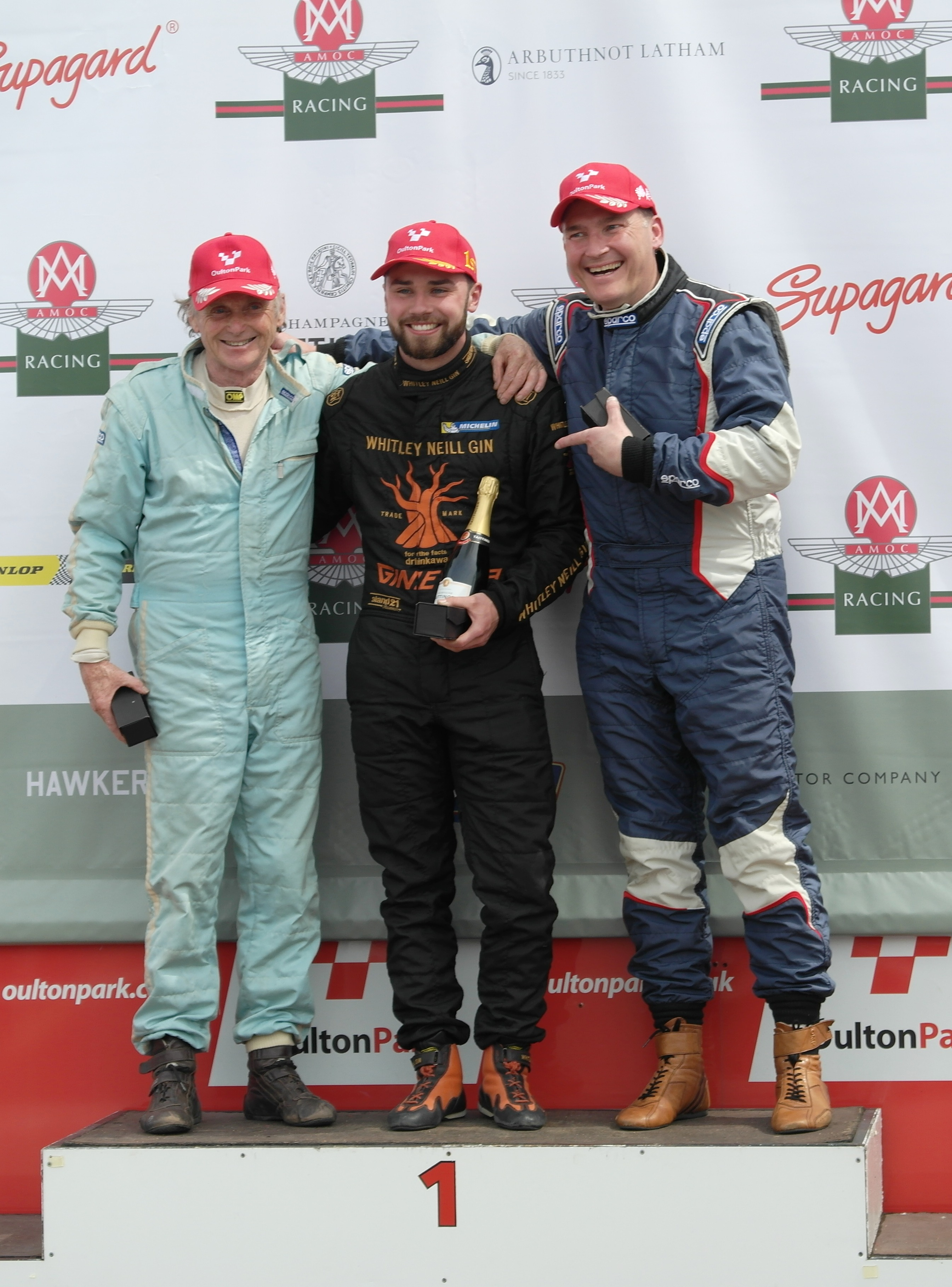
Declan Jones First Win 2018

=== Race 1: Oulton Park ===
Jones started the first race of the season at Oulton Park on pole position driving the "Tatty Turner" in the AMOC 50s Sports Car race. AMOC Racing Despite a slow start off the line, Jones was back in front within a few laps and maintained first position through to the end of the race. Race Result and Analysis

== Ginetta GT4 Supercup 2017 ==
For 2017, Jones signed up again with Century Motorsport to drive a Ginetta G55 GT4 in the Ginetta flagship championship with sponsorship from Whitley Neill Gin. So far in 2017, Jones has scored two third place finishes at Donington Park.

=== Round 1: Brands Hatch ===
Jones came close to putting his Whitley Neill Gin branded- Ginetta G55 on the podium in the opening round of the 2017 Michelin Ginetta GT4 Supercup. He then managed to finish eighth in the opening race, despite dropping to tenth at the start when he couldn’t engage second gear. He had then just got up to fourth in the second race, when two laps from the end a battle with a rival competitor ended with the 21-year-old punted into the pit wall. The race was red-flagged as a result. On Sunday, after fantastic overnight effort by Century Motorsport to re-build his car for the third and final race of the weekend that was broadcast live on UK television on ITV4, he battled his way through from the back to finish fourth only 0.835secs off the final spot on the rostrum.

=== Round 2: Donington Park ===
Jones battled his way through the field to fourth in the opening race on Saturday, despite starting in ninth after on-going niggles with the car.

Jones then went one better in the second race on Sunday, to equal his best-ever result in the Ginetta GT4 SuperCup, before another fine drive in the damp third and final race saw him again finish third – netting him his strongest overall weekend showing yet in the G55s. The results vault the Century Motorsport-Whitley Neill Gin team man up from ninth to joint second in the 2017 Michelin Ginetta GT4 SuperCup Drivers’ Championship with 110 points on the board.

=== Round 3: Oulton Park ===
Following Friday practice, Jones was fifth fastest in qualifying on the Saturday, less than a tenth off a place on the second row, despite very tricky wet slippery conditions. Jones then made a good start to the first race, before a little mistake on the second lap at Knickerbrook corner cruelly put him out. With his car fixed for the second race on Sunday, however, Jones kept his composure, hauling himself up from tenth to seventh and featuring heavily in the coverage broadcast live on UK television on ITV4. Seventh also netted him 16 valuable points for the Century Motorsport-Whitley Neill Gin team, leaving him sixth in the Championship.

=== Round 5: Snetterton ===
Jones claimed his first outright Ginetta win in his Whitley Neill Gin branded-Ginetta G55 during round five of the 2017 Michelin Ginetta GT4 SuperCup.

Jones switched to running with Rob Boston Racing for the second half of the season, began the event well and was fourth quickest overall in practice on Friday.

Jones then maintained that form in qualifying to secure a position on the second row of the grid, just 0.155 secs off third.

In the opening race, Jones fought back after a tricky start to bag fifth, before a brilliant performance in Sunday’s opener, race 2, saw him jump to third at the start and then proceed to claim victory.

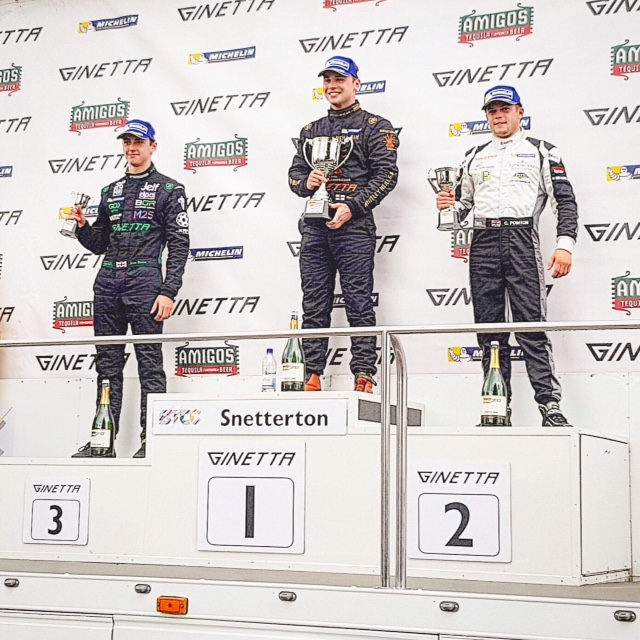
Declan Jones First Win 2017

That result – combined with a seventh place in race 3 that was broadcast live on UK television on ITV4 – saw him pick up 71 points in total from the weekend, moving the Rob Boston Racing-Whitely Neill Gin team man back up to fifth in the Championship with 243 points in total.

=== Round 6: Rockingham ===
Jones took his second win from as many events in his Whitley Neill Gin branded-Ginetta G55 during round six (August 26–27). The Halewood Wines & Spirits-backed star was in superb form in the third and final race of the weekend that was broadcast live on UK television on ITV4, leading from lights-to-flag and eventually easing away to finish over 3.5 seconds up on his nearest rival.

The Rob Boston Racing-Whitley Neill Gin team man claimed his first ever Ginetta G55 pole in qualifying on the Saturday with a 1min 21.915sec lap to maintain the momentum that had seen him claim his maiden Ginetta G55 win last time out at Snetterton. At the start of race one, however, he found himself unable to see the lights properly, and he retired on the first lap.

Jones stormed through from tenth on the grid to fourth in the second race, before winning the third and final race of the weekend. It was his fourth podium of the season, increasing his year-to-date tally to 301 points - just over a win off third place in the standings.

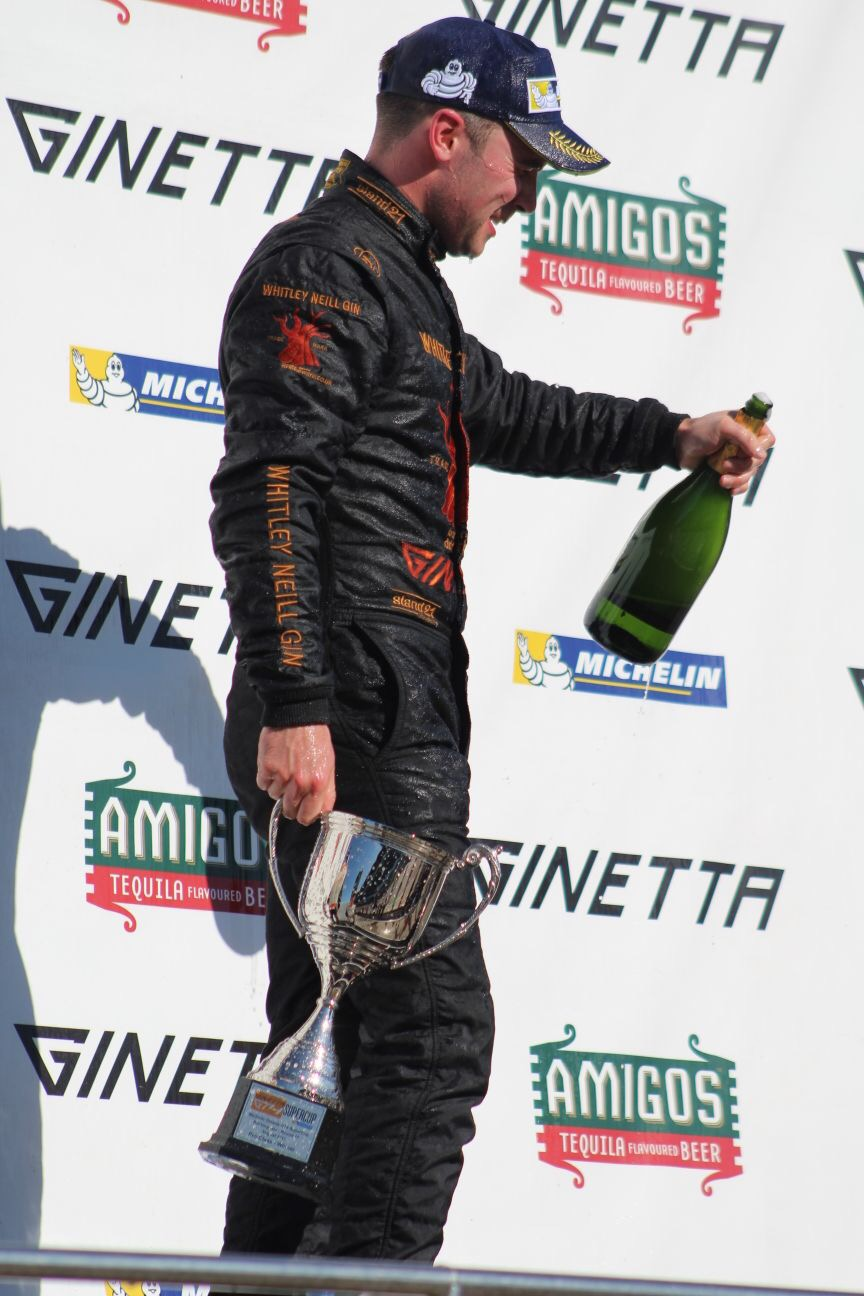
Declan Jones 2nd race win at Rockingham circuit..

=== Round 7: Silverstone ===
The Halewood Wines & Spirits-backed star again displayed race-winning pace and in the third and final race of the weekend battled his way through from ninth to third, grabbing the final rostrum position right at the end. However, due to a timing issue, all competitors did one extra lap, and on count back Declan was classified fourth. Despite that though, Jones showed good pace throughout and was fifth fastest in qualifying on the Saturday, just 0.033secs off the second row and only 0.309secs off pole. The Rob Boston Racing-Whitley Neill Gin team man then took fourth in the opening race, before being punted off with only a handful of laps remaining while running in the same position in the rain delayed second race. The final race might not have seen him take his third podium from as many events but the 22-year-old could still console himself with the fact he posted the fastest lap of the race and left having increased his season tally to 358 points in total, leaving him well in contention in the battle for third and fourth in the Championship – 19 points off P4.

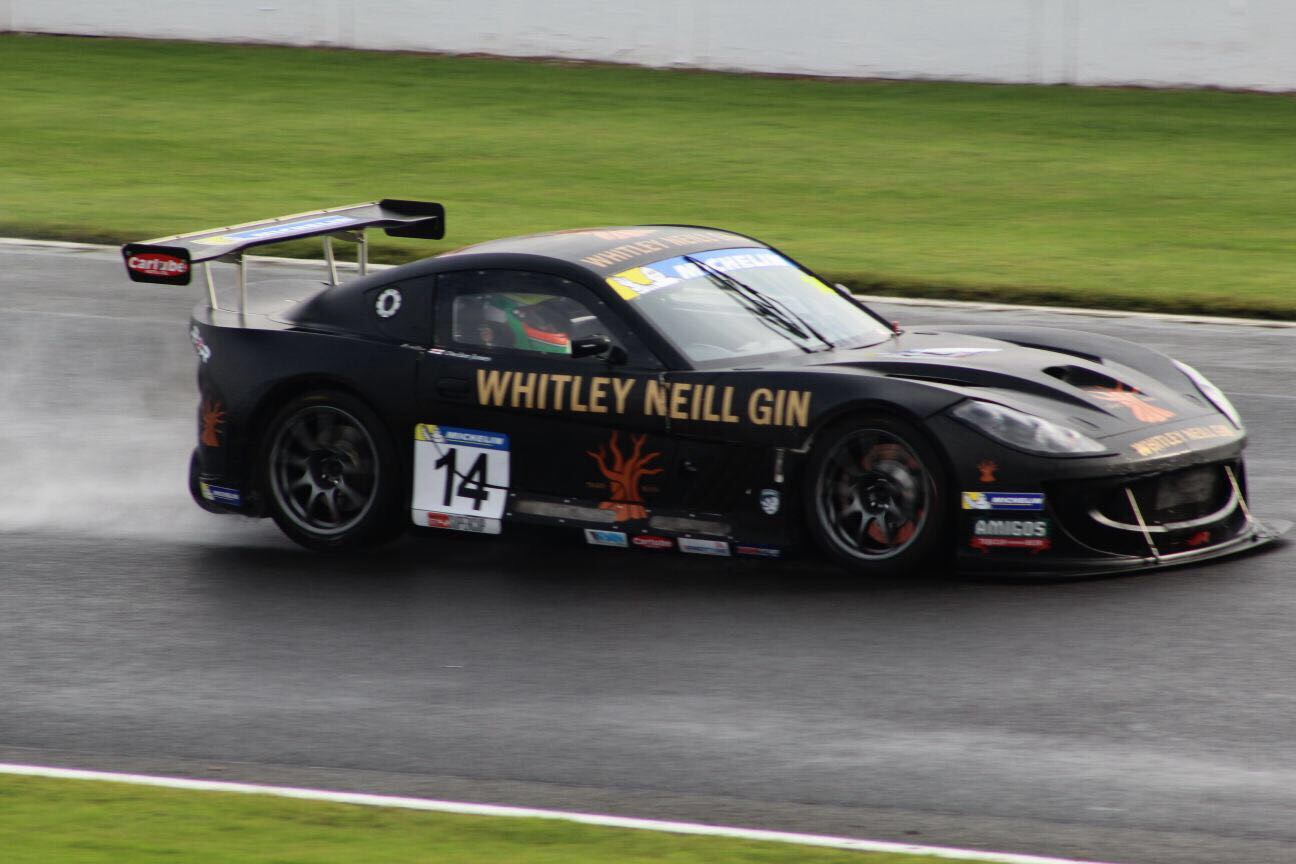
Declan Jones racing at Silverstone National circuit. 2017

=== Round 8: Brands Hatch ===
Jones finished the season by claiming two more podiums in his Whitley Neill Gin branded-Ginetta G55 during the eighth and final round of the 2017 Michelin Ginetta GT4 SuperCup at Brands Hatch. The Halewood Wines & Spirits-backed star ran at the front throughout the weekend and in qualifying on the Saturday posted the third fastest time, just 0.133secs off pole position and only 0.054secs off a place on the front row. Jones then made a good start in the opening race, moving to second and shadowing the leader all the way to the chequered flag. Race two on Sunday morning yielded another runners-up spot for the Rob Boston Racing-Whitley Neill Gin team man, who was battling for a rostrum from start-to-finish, snatching second on the final lap with a superb move up the inside of two of his rivals, despite very tricky wet conditions. In the third and final race of the weekend, Jones made a good start and even though something broke on the rear of his car, he still brought it home in fourth. That result helped ensure he secured fourth position in the Championship, ending the season with 440 points on the board.

Meanwhile, Rob Boston Racing boss, Rob Boston was delighted with Jones' form, especially as it helped the Lincolnshire squad secure the Team's Championship.

=== Championship Points ===
Circuit	B	B	B	D	D	D	OP	OP	C	C	C	Sn	Sn	Sn	R	R	R	S	S	S	B	B	B	Drop	Points	Position	
Round	1	2	3	4	5	6	7	8	9	10	11	12	13	14	15	16	17	18	19	20	21	22	23				
Points	14	RET	22	22	26	26	RET	16	10	18	18	20	35	16	1	22	35	22	12	23	30	30	22	0	440	4th	Final Standings

B: Brands Hatch Indy, D: Donington, OP: Oulton Park, C: Croft, Sn: Snetterton, R: Rockingham, S: Silverstone,

== British GT Championship ==
For 2013, DJones signed for Century Motorsport to compete in the British GT Championship, partnering Zoë Wenham, for the first 5 rounds, and Nathan Freke for rounds 6 and 7, in a GT4-class Ginetta G50. He finished 1st in the first two rounds at Oulton Park becoming one of the youngest ever winners in the series.

For 2014 Jones would once again the Avon Tyres British GT Championship, running with ABG Motorsport and using a BMW GT4.

Jones began the 2014 Avon Tyres British GT Championship with two fifth places at Oulton Park.

=== Championship Points History ===
Year											Points
	1	2	3	4	5	6	7	8	9	10	
2014	10	10	-	-12	-	-	-	-	-	-	8
2013	25	25	27	1.5	15	10	15	15	-	37.7	171

=== Victories ===
Year	Round	Pos	Class Pos	Circuit	Class
2013	1	19	1	Oulton Park	GT4
2013	2	20	1	Oulton Park	GT4
2013	10	18	1	Donington Park	GT4

== Former Team-mates ==
Year	Championship	Round	Car	Team Mate	Team	Car
2018	Britcar	7	198	Lucky Khera	Butler Motorsport	Ginetta G55 GT4
2014	British GT	3	45	Alain Schlesinger	RLR / Declan Jones	BMW GT4
2014	British GT	1 2	43	Peter Belshaw	ABG Motorsport	BMW GT4
2013	British GT	1 2 3 4 5	43	Zoë Wenham	Century Motorsport	Ginetta G50
2013	British GT	6 7	43	Nathan Freke	Century Motorsport	Ginetta G50
2012	VdeV Endurance	Le Mans, Dijon	54	Alain Schlesinger	Courage Classic	Chevron B54

== Racing record ==
=== Complete Britcar results ===
(key) (Races in bold indicate pole position in class – 1 point awarded just in first race; races in italics indicate fastest lap in class – 1 point awarded all races;-

Year	Team	Car	Class	1	2	3	4	5	6	7	8	9	10	11	12	13	14	DC	CP	Points
2018	Butler Motorsport	Ginetta G55 GT4	S2I	ROC; 1	ROC; 2	SIL; 1	SIL; 2	OUL; 1	OUL; 2	DON; 1	DON; 2	SNE; 1	SNE; 2	SIL; 1	SIL; 2	BRH; 1; 3	BRH; 1; 3	NC	NC	0†

† Not ineligible for points as he was an invitation entry.
