= TCR UK Touring Car Championship =

Touring car racing series based in the United Kingdom

- Category: Touring cars
- Country: United Kingdom
- Inaugural season: 2018
- Drivers: 34 (2022)
- Teams: 21 (2022)
- Constructors: Audi, Cupra, Honda, Hyundai, Subaru, Vauxhall, VW
- Tyre suppliers: Goodyear
- Drivers' champion: (United Kingdom) Callum Newsham
- Official website: https://www.tcr-uk.co.uk/

The TCR UK Touring Car Championship, known as the Touring Car Trophy from 2019 to 2021, is a touring car racing series based in the United Kingdom. It features production-based touring cars built to TCR specifications, and formerly also NGTC and Super 2000 specifications from 2019 to 2021. The championship is aimed as a feeder category to the BTCC and operated by Stewart Lines' Maximum Group.

== History ==
The TCR UK Touring Car Championship was first established in 2018 and was organised by the BRSCC. TCR UK was introduced as a feeder series for the more popular and expensive British Touring Car Championship although there was no direct link between the two series'. Interest in the new championship initially appeared high, with organisers discussing the possibility of qualifying races in order to accommodate the projected large grids. However, in reality grid numbers were low throughout the year with only 5 drivers competing at every event and the grid peaking at 13 cars in the season opener at Silverstone. Dan Lloyd took the inaugural championship in dominant fashion, winning 7 of the first 8 races and taking 4 pole positions.

The championship continued to struggle in 2019 and a few weeks before the first scheduled round at Snetterton, and with only 3 entries announced, the decision was made to combine the championship with Stewart Lines Touring Car Trophy. Lines would also takeover the running and organisation of the championship. The Touring Car Trophy was established in 2019 for older Super 2000 and NGTC machinery which was no longer eligible for the British Touring Car Championship. TCR UK would now be a class within the Touring Car Trophy with drivers in TCR cars able to fight for two championships. Henry Neal, son of 3 time BTCC champion Matt Neal, won the inaugural Touring Car Trophy driving a NGTC specification Honda Civic Type R while James Turkington, younger brother of another BTCC champion, Colin Turkington, fought off Lewis Kent to win the TCR UK class.

For 2020 the Volkswagen Racing Cup also joined the grid. Henry Neal and Lewis Kent dominated the season with Neal defending his title and Kent clinching his first TCR UK class title.

In 2021 the championship began to recover with entries reaching double figures for the first time since 2018. By seasons end the grid was entirely made up of TCR cars with Lewis Kent taking his second title ahead of 2020 Civic Cup champion Bruce Winfield.

The Touring Car Trophy was dissolved for 2022 with TCR UK once again becoming a standalone championship. The series experienced its biggest season yet with 20 cars appearing at every round and the grid peaking at 25 cars for 3 events. The championship was won by Chris Smiley ahead of Isaac Smith.

== Champions ==
TCR UK Touring Car Championship
Year	Champion (Car)		Team Champions (Car)			
2018	(United Kingdom) Daniel Lloyd	Volkswagen Golf GTI TCR	(Sweden) WestCoast Racing	Volkswagen Golf GTI TCR		
Touring Car Trophy
Year	Champion (Car)		Team Champions (Car)		TCR UK (Car)	
2019	(United Kingdom) Henry Neal	Honda Civic Type R	(United Kingdom) Ciceley Motorsport	CUPRA León TCR	(United Kingdom) James Turkington	CUPRA León TCR
2020	(United Kingdom) Henry Neal	Honda Civic Type R	(United Kingdom) Maximum Motorsport	CUPRA León TCR	(United Kingdom) Lewis Kent	Hyundai i30 N TCR
2021	(United Kingdom) Lewis Kent	Hyundai i30 N TCR	(United Kingdom) Essex & Kent Motorsport	Hyundai i30 N TCR	(United Kingdom) Lewis Kent	Hyundai i30 N TCR
TCR UK Touring Car Championship
Year	Champion (Car)		Tom Walker Memorial Trophy (Car)		Goodyear Diamond Trophy (Car)	
2022	(United Kingdom) Chris Smiley	Honda Civic Type R TCR (FK8)	(United Kingdom) Chris Smiley	Honda Civic Type R TCR (FK8)	(United Kingdom) Andy Wilmot	Hyundai i30 N TCR
2023	(United Kingdom) Carl Boardley	CUPRA León TCR	(United Kingdom) Carl Boardley	CUPRA León TCR	(United Kingdom) Carl Boardley	CUPRA León TCR
2024	(United Kingdom) Carl Boardley	CUPRA León TCR	(United Kingdom) Rick Kerry	CUPRA León TCR	(United Kingdom) Darron Lewis	Hyundai i30 N TCR
TCR UK Touring Car Championship
Year	Champion / Team (Car)		Teams Championship (Car)		Goodyear Diamond Trophy (Car)	
2025	(United Kingdom) Adam Shepherd / Capture Motorsport	CUPRA León VZ TCR	(United Kingdom) Area Motorsport	CUPRA León TCR	(United Kingdom) Mark Smith	CUPRA León VZ TCR
