= Hugo Cook =

British racing driver (born 2004)

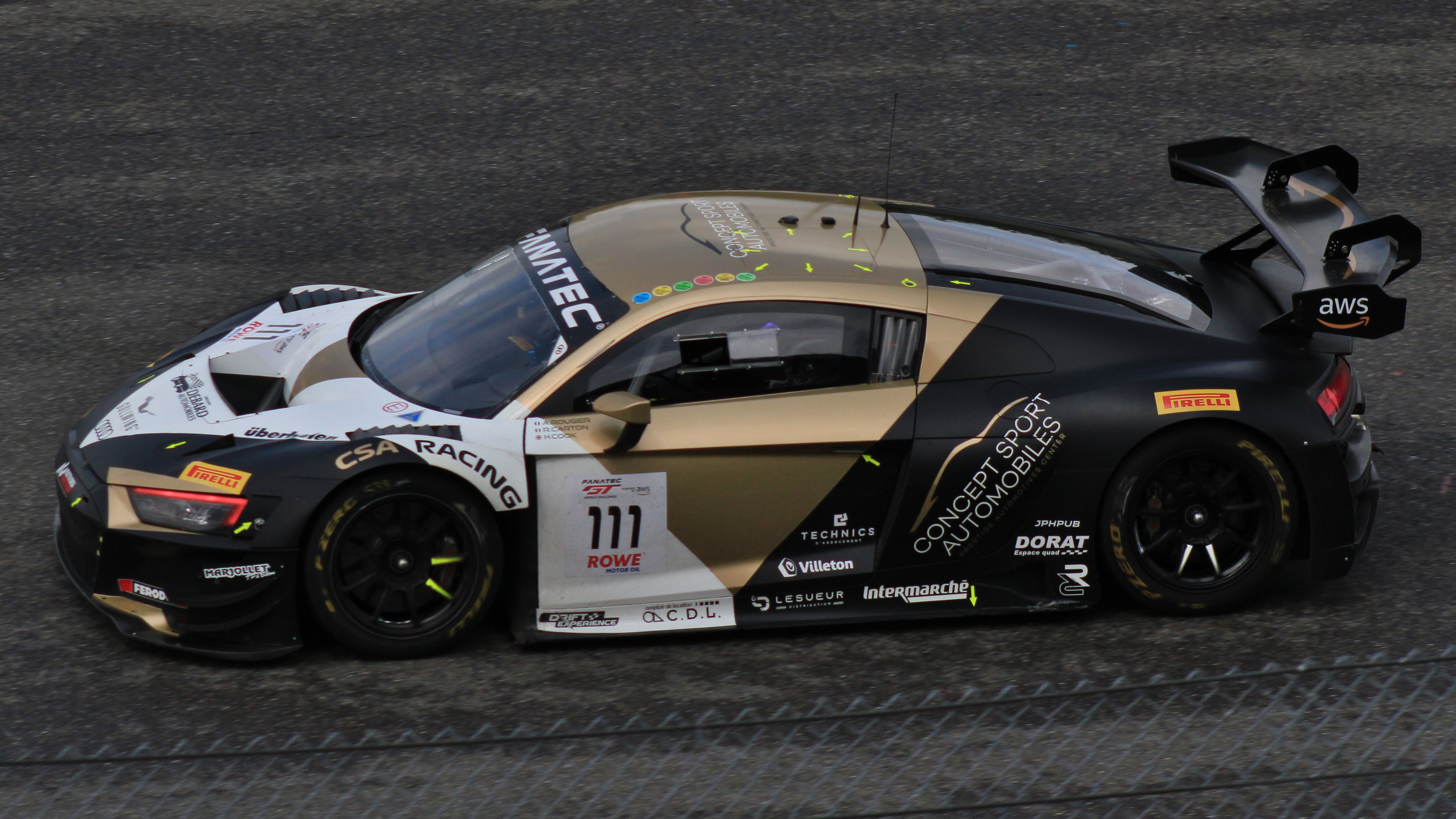
- Cook in 2024
- Nationality: (United Kingdom) British
- Born: Hugo John Deveroux Cook; 29 July 2004 (age 22) Northwich, England
- Categorisation: FIA Silver (until 2026); FIA Gold (2027–)

Championship titles
- 2023: GT Cup Championship – GT3

Hugo John Deveroux Cook (born 29 July 2004) is a British racing driver who last competed in the GT3 class of the British GT Championship for Barwell Motorsport.

== Personal life ==
Cook is the son of Peter Cook, a former racing driver.

== Career ==
Cook began racing in 2020, making a one-off appearance in the Silverstone round of the Britcar Endurance Championship for Simpson Motorsport. Remaining with the Audi RS 3 LMS customer for his first full season in the series the following year, scoring a lone class win in race two at Silverstone and three other podiums to end the season fifth in the Class 4 standings. In parallel, Cook raced with the same team in the Touring Car Trophy, scoring a lone podium at Donington Park en route to eighth in points despite missing two rounds.

In 2022, Cook returned to the newly-rebranded TCR UK Touring Car Championship and Simpson Motorsport for what was set to be a full-season campaign, before leaving the series two rounds into the season, having only scored points by qualifying second at Donington Park. Cook returned to the team later in the year, as he raced in the final three rounds of the British Endurance Championship in Class A, scoring a best result of second at Silverstone and the first Donington Park enduro. During 2022, Cook also raced in select rounds of the GT Cup Championship in the GT3 class, for both Enduro Motorsport at Silverstone and Cook Motorsport for the final two rounds.

Joining Audi R8–fielding J&S Racing to remain in the GT Cup Championship the following year, Cook amassed eight overall wins and eight more class wins to secure the GT3 title at season's end. At the start of 2024, Cook joined AGMC Racing Team by Simpson Motorsport to race in the Dubai 24 Hour in the GT4 class, finishing second in class in his first appearance at the event. For the rest of the year, Cook returned to J&S Racing for his maiden season in the British GT Championship alongside Sacha Kakad. Racing in the GT3 class, Cook scored a best result of fifth in race one at Snetterton en route to a 13th-place points finish. In parallel, Cook also raced in the GT World Challenge Europe Endurance Cup, competing in the Silver Cup for the first two rounds for Lamborghini-affiliated GRT Grasser Racing Team, before switching to Audi-linked CSA Racing for the final three rounds. During 2024, Cook also made a one-off appearance in the GT World Challenge Europe Sprint Cup for Saintéloc Racing at Brands Hatch.

Switching to Barwell Motorsport for 2025 as a new Lamborghini junior, Cook led a dual campaign in both the British GT Championship and the GT World Challenge Europe Sprint Cup. In the former, Cook began the year alongside Matt Topham, before being paired with Rob Collard for the rest of the season, in which he scored a lone win at Oulton Park and four other podiums to secure runner-up honors in points. Racing alongside Sandy Mitchell in the latter, Cook scored a best result of seventh at both Brands Hatch and Zandvoort en route to a 20th-place points finish. During 2025, Cook also raced for Mercedes-affiliated Boutsen VDS at the 24 Hours of Spa. At the end of the year, Cook won the Lamborghini GT3 Young Driver Shootout at Misano.

The following year, Cook remained with Barwell Motorsport for his third season in the British GT Championship alongside Collard. In his second season with the team, Cook won at Oulton Park and Donington Park to enter the finale as the points leader, but a mistake from Collard at the Brands Hatch finale cost them the title and they were forced to settle for third overall. During 2026, Cook also made select appearances in the Italian GT Championship Endurance and Sprint Cups with Lamborghini-affiliated VSR, during which he took sprint podiums at both Mugello and Monza.

== Racing record ==
=== Racing career summary ===
Season	Series	Team	Races	Wins	Poles	F/Laps	Podiums	Points	Position
2020	Britcar Endurance Championship – Class 4 Invitational	Simpson Motorsport	2	0	0	0	1	0	NC†
2020	Birkett 6 Hour Relay – Class C	Simpson Motorsport	1	1	0	0	1	—N/a	**1st**
2021	Touring Car Trophy	Simpson Motorsport	9	0	0	0	1	111	8th
2021	Britcar Endurance Championship – Class 4	Simpson Motorsport	9	1	1	1	4	162	5th
2022	TCR UK Touring Car Championship	Simpson Motorsport	1	0	0	0	0	5	25th
2022	British Endurance Championship – Class A	Simpson Motorsport	3	0	1	2	3	82	5th
2022	GT Cup Championship – GT3	Enduro Motorsport	3	2	0	0	3	0	NC
2022	GT Cup Championship – GT3	Cook Motorsport	5	2	0	0	3	0	NC
2023	GT Cup Championship – GT3	J&S Racing	26	16	9	8	26	540.5	**1st**
2023–24	Middle East Trophy – GT4	AGMC Racing Team by Simpson Motorsport	1	0	0	0	1	36	NC
2024	British GT Championship – GT3	J&S Racing	9	0	0	0	0	20.5	13th
2024	GT World Challenge Europe Endurance Cup	GRT Grasser Racing Team	2	0	0	0	0	0	NC
2024	GT World Challenge Europe Endurance Cup	CSA Racing	3	0	0	0	0	0	NC
2024	GT World Challenge Europe Endurance Cup – Silver	GRT Grasser Racing Team	2	0	0	0	0	24	26th
2024	GT World Challenge Europe Endurance Cup – Gold	CSA Racing	3	0	1	1	0	25	12th
2024	GT World Challenge Europe Sprint Cup	Saintéloc Racing	2	0	0	0	0	0	NC
2024	GT World Challenge Europe Sprint Cup – Silver	Saintéloc Racing	2	0	0	0	0	9	17th
2024	British Endurance Championship	PB Racing by JMH	1	1	0	0	1	182‡	**1st‡**
2025	British GT Championship – GT3	Barwell Motorsport	9	1	2	0	4	144	**2nd**
2025	GT World Challenge Europe Sprint Cup	Barwell Motorsport	10	0	0	0	0	6.5	20th
2025	GT World Challenge Europe Endurance Cup	Boutsen VDS	1	0	0	0	0	0	NC
2025	GT World Challenge Europe Endurance Cup – Silver	Boutsen VDS	1	0	0	0	0	31	12th
2025	Intercontinental GT Challenge	Boutsen VDS	1	0	0	0	0	0	NC
2026	British GT Championship – GT3	Barwell Motorsport	8	2	0	0	3	125.5	**3rd**
2026	Italian GT Championship Endurance Cup – GT3	VSR	2	0	0	0	0	12	NC
2026	Italian GT Championship Sprint Cup – GT3	VSR	4	0	0	0	2	25	NC
2026	24H Series – GT3 Am	Continental Racing by Simpson Motorsport	1	0	0	0	0	0	24th

^{†} As Cook was a guest driver, he was ineligible to score points.

^{‡} Team standings

=== Complete TCR UK Touring Car Championship results ===
(key) (Races in bold indicate pole position – 1 point awarded just in first race; races in italics indicate fastest lap – 1 point awarded all races; * signifies that driver led race for at least one lap – 1 point given all races)

Year	Team	Car	1	2	3	4	5	6	7	8	9	10	11	12	13	14	15	DC	Points
2021	Simpson Motorsport	Audi RS3 LMS TCR (2017)	SIL; 1; 5	SIL; 2; 6	CAS; 1	CAS; 2	BRH; 1	BRH; 2	BRH; 3	OUL; 1; 11	OUL; 2; 9	ANG; 1; 5	ANG; 2 Ret	DON; 1; 8	DON; 2; 8	DON; 3; 3		8th	111
2022	Simpson Motorsport	Audi RS3 LMS TCR (2017)	OUL; 1 WD	OUL; 2 WD	DON; 1 Ret^{2}	DON; 2 DNS	BRH; 1	BRH; 2	BRH; 3	OUL; 1	OUL; 2	CAS; 1	CAS; 2	DON; 1	DON; 2	SNE; 1	SNE; 2	25th	5

=== Complete British GT Championship results ===
(key) (Races in bold indicate pole position in class) (Races in italics indicate fastest lap in class)

Year	Entrant	Chassis	Class	1	2	3	4	5	6	7	8	9	Pos.	Points
2024	J&S Racing	Audi R8 LMS Evo II	GT3	OUL; 1; 15	OUL; 2; 12	SIL; 15	DON; 10	SPA; 26	SNE; 1; 5	SNE; 2; 12	DON; 11	BRH; 9	13th	20.5
2025	Barwell Motorsport	Lamborghini Huracán GT3 Evo 2	GT3	DON; 6	SIL; 6	**OUL**; **1**; 1	OUL; 2; 10	SPA; 3	SNE; 1; 8	SNE; 2; 3	BRH; 3	**DON**; 2	2nd	144
2026	Barwell Motorsport	Lamborghini Huracán GT3 Evo 2	GT3	SIL; Ret	OUL; 1; 1	OUL; 2; 4	SPA; 4	SNE; 1; 2	SNE; 2; 4	DON; 1	BRH; 10		3rd	125.5

=== Complete GT World Challenge Europe results ===
==== GT World Challenge Europe Endurance Cup ====
(Races in bold indicate pole position) (Races in italics indicate fastest lap)

Year	Team	Car	Class	1	2	3	4	5	6	7	Pos.	Points
2024	GRT Grasser Racing Team	Lamborghini Huracán GT3 Evo 2	Silver	LEC; 44	SPA; 6H; 50	SPA; 12H; 47	SPA; 24H; 37				26th	14
2024	CSA Racing	Audi R8 LMS Evo II	Gold					NÜR; 21	MNZ; 33	**JED**; Ret	12th	25
2025	Boutsen VDS	Mercedes-AMG GT3 Evo	Silver	LEC	MNZ	SPA; 6H; 18	SPA; 12H; 18	SPA; 24H; 27	NÜR	CAT	12th	27

==== GT World Challenge Europe Sprint Cup ====
(key) (Races in bold indicate pole position) (Races in italics indicate fastest lap)

Year	Team	Car	Class	1	2	3	4	5	6	7	8	9	10	Pos.	Points
2024	Saintéloc Racing	Audi R8 LMS Evo II	Silver	BRH; 1; 16	BRH; 2; 22	MIS; 1	MIS; 2	HOC; 1	HOC; 2	MAG; 1	MAG; 2	CAT; 1	CAT; 2	17th	9
2025	Barwell Motorsport	Lamborghini Huracán GT3 Evo 2	Pro	BRH; 1; 10	BRH; 2; 7	ZAN; 1; 7	ZAN; 2; 29	MIS; 1; 16	MIS; 2; 16	MAG; 1; 16	MAG; 2; 11	VAL; 1 Ret	VAL; 2; 18	20th	6.5
