= 2018 Ginetta GT4 Supercup =

The 2018 Michelin Ginetta GT4 Supercup is a multi-event, one make GT motor racing championship held across England and Scotland. The championship features a mix of professional motor racing teams and privately funded drivers, competing in Ginetta G55s that conform to the technical regulations for the championship. It forms part of the extensive program of support categories built up around the BTCC centrepiece. It is the eighth Ginetta GT4 Supercup, having rebranded from the Ginetta G50 Cup, which ran between 2008 and 2010. The season commenced on 1 April at Brands Hatch – on the circuit's Indy configuration – and concludes on 30 September at the same venue, utilising the Grand Prix circuit, after twenty-two races held at eight meetings, all in support of the 2017 British Touring Car Championship season.

== Teams and drivers ==
| Team | No. | Drivers | Rounds |
Professional
| Hart GT | 11 | (United Kingdom) Jac Constable | All |
| Hart GT | 55 | (United Kingdom) Ollie Chadwick | 8 |
| Team HARD | 17 | (United Kingdom) Adam Shephard | 1 |
| Team HARD | 33 | (United Kingdom) Angus Dudley | 2 |
| Team HARD | 41 | (United Kingdom) Carl Boardley | 1-4 |
| Rob Boston Racing | 17 | (United Kingdom) Adam Shepherd | 2-3, 5, 8 |
| Rob Boston Racing | 25 | (United Kingdom) Tom Roche | All |
| Rob Boston Racing | 32 | (United Kingdom) Charlie Ladell | All |
| Elite Motorsport | 19 | (United Kingdom) Harry King | All |
| Century Motorsport | 48 | (United Kingdom) Andrew Gordon-Colebrooke | All |
| Century Motorsport | 67 | (United Kingdom) Angus Fender | All |
| Carl Boardley Motorsport | 41 | (United Kingdom) Carl Boardley | 5-8 |
| AK Automotive | 99 | (United Kingdom) Carl Shield | All |
| Privateers | 12 | (United Kingdom) Reece Somerfield | All |
| Privateers | 62 | (United Kingdom) Adam Higgins | 5 |
| Privateers | 81 | (United Kingdom) Tom Hibbert | 1 |
Amateur
| TecservUK | 3 | (United Kingdom) Grahame Tilley | 1–2 |
| Rob Boston Racing | 7 | (United Kingdom) David Brooks | All |
| Butler Motorsport | 24 | (United Kingdom) Lucky Khera | All |
| Butler Motorsport | 98 | (United Kingdom) Lee Frost | All |
| Hart GT | 40 | (United Kingdom) Alexis Taylor | All |
| Hart GT | 66 | (United Kingdom) Jack Minshaw | All |
| Hart GT | 94 | (United Kingdom) Nicholas Zapolski | 7 |
| Century Motorsport | 77 | (United Kingdom) Michael Crees | All |
| CWS Racing | 78 | (United Kingdom) Colin White | All |
| Privateers | 95 | (United Kingdom) Giles Dawson | 7 |

== Race calendar ==
| Round | Circuit | Date | Pole position | Fastest lap | Winner Driver | Winning team | Winning Am Driver |
|---|---|---|---|---|---|---|---|
| 1 | Brands Hatch (Indy Circuit, Kent) | 7 April | (United Kingdom) Charlie Ladell | (United Kingdom) Charlie Ladell | (United Kingdom) Charlie Ladell | Rob Boston Racing | (United Kingdom) Jack Minshaw |
| 1 | Brands Hatch (Indy Circuit, Kent) | 8 April | | (United Kingdom) Charlie Ladell | (United Kingdom) Charlie Ladell | Rob Boston Racing | (United Kingdom) Michael Crees |
| 1 | Brands Hatch (Indy Circuit, Kent) | 8 April | | (United Kingdom) Carl Boardley | (United Kingdom) Carl Boardley | Team HARD | (United Kingdom) Michael Crees |
| 2 | Donington Park (National Circuit, Leicestershire) | 28 April | (United Kingdom) Harry King | (United Kingdom) Harry King | (United Kingdom) Charlie Ladell | Rob Boston Racing | (United Kingdom) Michael Crees |
| 2 | Donington Park (National Circuit, Leicestershire) | 29 April | | (United Kingdom) Charlie Ladell | (United Kingdom) Tom Roche | Rob Boston Racing | (United Kingdom) Colin White |
| 2 | Donington Park (National Circuit, Leicestershire) | 29 April | | (United Kingdom) Carl Boardley | (United Kingdom) Harry King | Elite Motorsport | (United Kingdom) Colin White |
| 3 | Oulton Park (Island Circuit, Cheshire) | 9 June | (United Kingdom) Charlie Ladell | (United Kingdom) Charlie Ladell | (United Kingdom) Charlie Ladell | Rob Boston Racing | (United Kingdom) David Brooks |
| 3 | Oulton Park (Island Circuit, Cheshire) | 10 June | | (United Kingdom) Charlie Ladell | (United Kingdom) Charlie Ladell | Rob Boston Racing | (United Kingdom) Colin White |
| 4 | Croft Circuit (North Yorkshire) | 23 June | (United Kingdom) Angus Fender | (United Kingdom) Angus Fender | (United Kingdom) Carl Boardley | Team HARD | (United Kingdom) Michael Crees |
| 4 | Croft Circuit (North Yorkshire) | 24 June | | (United Kingdom) Charlie Ladell | (United Kingdom) Carl Boardley | Team HARD | (United Kingdom) Jack Minshaw |
| 4 | Croft Circuit (North Yorkshire) | 24 June | | (United Kingdom) Jac Constable | (United Kingdom) Carl Boardley | Team HARD | (United Kingdom) Michael Crees |
| 5 | Snetterton Circuit (300 Circuit, Norfolk) | 28 July | (United Kingdom) Harry King | (United Kingdom) Harry King | (United Kingdom) Harry King | Elite Motorsport | (United Kingdom) Michael Crees |
| 5 | Snetterton Circuit (300 Circuit, Norfolk) | 29 July | | (United Kingdom) Tom Roche | (United Kingdom) Harry King | Elite Motorsport | (United Kingdom) Michael Crees |
| 5 | Snetterton Circuit (300 Circuit, Norfolk) | 29 July | | (United Kingdom) Adam Shepherd | (United Kingdom) Charlie Ladell | Rob Boston Racing | (United Kingdom) Colin White |
| 6 | Rockingham Motor Speedway (International Super Sports Car Circuit, Northamptonshire) | 11 August | (United Kingdom) Tom Roche | (United Kingdom) Jac Constable | (United Kingdom) Tom Roche | Rob Boston Racing | (United Kingdom) Michael Crees |
| 6 | Rockingham Motor Speedway (International Super Sports Car Circuit, Northamptonshire) | 12 August | | (United Kingdom) Carl Boardley | (United Kingdom) Carl Boardley | Team HARD | (United Kingdom) Colin White |
| 6 | Rockingham Motor Speedway (International Super Sports Car Circuit, Northamptonshire) | 12 August | | (United Kingdom) Harry King | (United Kingdom) Harry King | Elite Motorsport | (United Kingdom) Michael Crees |
| 7 | Silverstone Circuit (National Circuit, Northamptonshire) | 15 September | (United Kingdom) Charlie Ladell | (United Kingdom) Tom Roche | (United Kingdom) Charlie Ladell | Rob Boston Racing | (United Kingdom) Michael Crees |
| 7 | Silverstone Circuit (National Circuit, Northamptonshire) | 15 September | | (United Kingdom) Tom Roche | (United Kingdom) Charlie Ladell | Rob Boston Racing | (United Kingdom) Michael Crees |
| 7 | Silverstone Circuit (National Circuit, Northamptonshire) | 16 September | | (United Kingdom) Tom Roche | (United Kingdom) Carl Boardley | Team HARD | (United Kingdom) Michael Crees |
| 8 | Brands Hatch (Grand Prix Circuit, Kent) | 29 September | (United Kingdom) Charlie Ladell | (United Kingdom) Carl Boardley | (United Kingdom) Charlie Ladell | Rob Boston Racing | (United Kingdom) Jack Minshaw |
| 8 | Brands Hatch (Grand Prix Circuit, Kent) | 30 September | | (United Kingdom) Angus Fender | (United Kingdom) Charlie Ladell | Rob Boston Racing | (United Kingdom) Colin White |
| 8 | Brands Hatch (Grand Prix Circuit, Kent) | 30 September | | (United Kingdom) Tom Roche | (United Kingdom) Tom Roche | Rob Boston Racing | (United Kingdom) Colin White |

== Championship standings ==
Points system
| 1st | 2nd | 3rd | 4th | 5th | 6th | 7th | 8th | 9th | 10th | 11th | 12th | 13th | 14th | 15th | 16th | 17th | 18th | 19th | 20th | R1 PP | FL |
| 35 | 30 | 26 | 22 | 20 | 18 | 16 | 14 | 12 | 11 | 10 | 9 | 8 | 7 | 6 | 5 | 4 | 3 | 2 | 1 | 1 | 1 |

Notes

- A driver's best 22 scores counted towards the championship, with any other points being discarded.

=== Drivers' championships ===
| Pos | Driver | BHI | | | DON | | | OUL | | CRO | | | SNE | | | ROC | | | SIL | | | BHGP | | | Points |
Professional
| 1 | (United Kingdom) Charlie Ladell | 1 | 1 | 3 | 1 | 3 | 2 | 1 | 1 | 2 | 2 | 3 | 2 | 11 | 1 | 3 | 4 | 2 | 1 | 1 | 2 | 1 | 1 | DNS | 680 |
| 2 | (United Kingdom) Carl Boardley | 2 | 2 | 1 | 2 | 2 | 4 | 2 | 2 | 1 | 1 | 1 | 3 | 4 | 8 | 5 | 1 | 4 | 4 | 4 | 1 | 4 | 18 | 2 | 620 |
| 3 | (United Kingdom) Harry King | 3 | 3 | 7 | 6 | 4 | 1 | Ret | 10 | 3 | 14 | DSQ | 1 | 1 | 6 | 2 | 2 | 1 | 2 | 2 | 4 | 3 | 2 | 5 | 518 |
| 4 | (United Kingdom) Tom Roche | 6 | Ret | 2 | 4 | 1 | 5 | 14 | 4 | 10 | 7 | 6 | 5 | 3 | 5 | 1 | 3 | Ret | 3 | Ret | Ret | Ret | 4 | 1 | 424 |
| 5 | (United Kingdom) Angus Fender | Ret | 8 | 9 | 3 | Ret | Ret | 5 | 7 | 4 | 3 | 9 | 9 | 5 | 9 | 6 | 5 | 3 | 7 | 3 | 3 | 2 | 3 | 11 | 402 |
| 6 | (United Kingdom) Jac Constable | 8 | 4 | 5 | 7 | 8 | 6 | 6 | 14 | Ret | 5 | 2 | 4 | 2 | 7 | 8 | 10 | 9 | 15 | 16 | 5 | 5 | 8 | Ret | 378 |
| 7 | (United Kingdom) Carl Shield | 9 | 5 | 4 | 8 | 6 | 8 | 7 | 5 | 6 | 9 | 4 | 7 | 12 | Ret | 13 | 14 | 7 | 8 | 6 | 15 | 7 | 5 | 4 | 364 |
| 8 | (United Kingdom) Reece Somerfield | 4 | Ret | 6 | 15 | 9 | Ret | 4 | 6 | 5 | 4 | 8 | 6 | 7 | 11 | 7 | 8 | 5 | 6 | 5 | 10 | 15 | 7 | Ret | 342 |
| 9 | (United Kingdom) Adam Shepherd | Ret | Ret | Ret | 5 | 5 | 3 | 3 | 3 | | | | 8 | 10 | 2 | | | | | | | 6 | 6 | 3 | 241 |
| 10 | (United Kingdom) Andrew Gordon-Colebrooke | 7 | 7 | 8 | Ret | 14 | 7 | 8 | Ret | Ret | 6 | Ret | 10 | Ret | 10 | 4 | 9 | Ret | 5 | 9 | 6 | 9 | 10 | Ret | 230 |
| 11 | (United Kingdom) Tom Hibbert | 5 | Ret | 15 | | | | | | | | | | | | | | | | | | | | | 31 |
| 12 | (United Kingdom) Ollie Chadwick | | | | | | | | | | | | | | | | | | | | | 8 | 9 | Ret | 26 |
| 13 | (United Kingdom) Angus Dudley | | | | 12 | Ret | DNS | | | | | | | | | | | | | | | | | | 12 |
| 14 (G) | (United Kingdom) Adam Higgins | | | | | | | | | | | | 12 | 6 | 3 | | | | | | | | | | 0 |
Amateur
| 1 | (United Kingdom) Michael Crees | 11 | 6 | 13 | 9 | Ret | 10 | Ret | 13 | 7 | 10 | 6 | 11 | 8 | 12 | 9 | 7 | 6 | 9 | 7 | 7 | 12 | 12 | 7 | 673 |
| 2 | (United Kingdom) Colin White | 16 | Ret | 11 | 10 | 7 | 9 | 13 | 8 | 9 | 15 | 11 | 13 | 9 | 4 | 10 | 6 | 10 | 14 | 10 | Ret | 11 | 11 | 6 | 600 |
| 3 | (United Kingdom) Jack Minshaw | 10 | 9 | 10 | 11 | 13 | 11 | Ret | 9 | 8 | 8 | Ret | 14 | 15 | 13 | 12 | 11 | 8 | 10 | 8 | 8 | 10 | 15 | Ret | 569 |
| 4 | (United Kingdom) Lee Frost | 15 | 10 | Ret | Ret | 12 | 14 | 11 | 11 | 12 | 13 | 10 | 18 | 13 | Ret | 14 | 12 | 11 | 12 | Ret | 14 | 13 | 14 | 10 | 410 |
| 5 | (United Kingdom) Alexis Taylor | 12 | Ret | Ret | 14 | 10 | Ret | 10 | 12 | 13 | 11 | 7 | 15 | Ret | 14 | 15 | 13 | 12 | 13 | 13 | 13 | Ret | 16 | 8 | 392 |
| 6 | (United Kingdom) Lucky Khera | 13 | Ret | 14 | 13 | 11 | 12 | 12 | 15 | Ret | 16 | 12 | 17 | 16 | 15 | 16 | 15 | Ret | 18 | 11 | 9 | 14 | 13 | 9 | 391 |
| 7 | (United Kingdom) David Brooks | 14 | Ret | 12 | 16 | 16 | Ret | 9 | 16 | 11 | 12 | Ret | 16 | 14 | 16 | 11 | 16 | Ret | 17 | 14 | 16 | Ret | 17 | Ret | 332 |
| 8 | (United Kingdom) Nicholas Zapolski | | | | | | | | | | | | | | | | | | 11 | 12 | 12 | | | | 66 |
| 9 | (United Kingdom) Giles Dawson | | | | | | | | | | | | | | | | | | 16 | 15 | 11 | | | | 52 |
| 10 | (United Kingdom) Grahame Tilley | Ret | DNS | DNS | Ret | 15 | 13 | | | | | | | | | | | | | | | | | | 38 |
