= 2017 Ginetta GT4 Supercup =

The 2017 Michelin Ginetta GT4 Supercup is a multi-event, one make GT motor racing championship held across England and Scotland. The championship features a mix of professional motor racing teams and privately funded drivers, competing in Ginetta G55s that conform to the technical regulations for the championship. It forms part of the extensive program of support categories built up around the BTCC centrepiece. It is the seventh Ginetta GT4 Supercup, having rebranded from the Ginetta G50 Cup, which ran between 2008 and 2010. The season commenced on 2 April at Brands Hatch – on the circuit's Indy configuration – and concludes on 2 October at the same venue, utilising the Grand Prix circuit, after twenty-two races held at eight meetings, all in support of the 2017 British Touring Car Championship season.

== Teams and drivers ==
Team	No.	Drivers	Rounds
Professional
HHC Motorsport	7	(United Kingdom) Callum Pointon	All
Total Control Racing	12	(United Kingdom) Reece Somerfield	All
Century Motorsport	14	(United Kingdom) Declan Jones	1–4
Century Motorsport	22	(United Kingdom) Ben Green	All
Rob Boston Racing	14	(United Kingdom) Declan Jones	5–8
Rob Boston Racing	16	(United Kingdom) Jack Mitchell	1, 3, 5–8
Rob Boston Racing	23	(United Kingdom) George Gamble	6–8
Rob Boston Racing	25	(United Kingdom) Tom Roche	2, 4
Rob Boston Racing	29	(United Kingdom) Jason Baker	6–8
Rob Boston Racing	32	(United Kingdom) Charles Ladell	All
Rob Boston Racing	77	(United Kingdom) Seb Perez	6–8
JHR Developments	23	(United Kingdom) George Gamble	1–5
JHR Developments	77	(United Kingdom) Seb Perez	1–5
Xentek Motorsport	41	(United Kingdom) Carl Boardley	All
Hurricane Motorsport	62	(United Kingdom) Adam Higgins	1–5, 7–8
Privateer	81	(United Kingdom) Tom Hibbert	All
Amateur
Tecserv UK	3	(United Kingdom) Grahame Tilley	1–2
Xentek Motorsport	11	(United Kingdom) Jac Constable	All
Xentek Motorsport	40	(United Kingdom) Alexis Taylor	All
Xentek Motorsport	66	(United Kingdom) Jack Minshaw	All
RACE Performance	21	(United Kingdom) Andy Wilmot	4
TAG Racing	21	(United Kingdom) Andy Wilmot	2–3
TAG Racing	15	(United Kingdom) Toby Bearne	6–8
TAG Racing	34	(United Kingdom) Dan Kirby	All
TAG Racing	52	(United Kingdom) Paul Taylor	7–8
Total Control Racing	26	(United Kingdom) Ian Robinson	All
Rob Boston Racing	29	(United Kingdom) Jason Baker	3
Century Motorsport	44	(United Kingdom) Gary Lancashire	4
CWS Racing	78	(United Kingdom) Colin White	All
Privateer	5	(United Kingdom) Fraser Robertson	7
Privateer	67	(United Kingdom) David Brooks	All

== Race calendar and results ==
Round		Circuit	Date	Pole position	Fastest lap	Winning driver	Winning team	Amateur winner
1	R1	Brands Hatch (Indy Circuit, Kent)	1 April	(United Kingdom) George Gamble	(United Kingdom) George Gamble	(United Kingdom) George Gamble	JHR Developments	(United Kingdom) Colin White
1	R2	Brands Hatch (Indy Circuit, Kent)	2 April		(United Kingdom) Jack Mitchell	(United Kingdom) Jack Mitchell	Rob Boston Racing	(United Kingdom) Colin White
1	R3	Brands Hatch (Indy Circuit, Kent)	2 April		(United Kingdom) Jack Mitchell	(United Kingdom) George Gamble	JHR Developments	(United Kingdom) Jac Constable
2	R4	Donington Park (National Circuit, Leicestershire)	15 April	(United Kingdom) George Gamble	(United Kingdom) Tom Roche	(United Kingdom) Callum Pointon	HHC Motorsport	(United Kingdom) Colin White
2	R5	Donington Park (National Circuit, Leicestershire)	16 April		(United Kingdom) George Gamble	(United Kingdom) Tom Roche	Rob Boston Racing	(United Kingdom) Colin White
2	R6	Donington Park (National Circuit, Leicestershire)	16 April		(United Kingdom) Callum Pointon	(United Kingdom) Ben Green	Century Motorsport	(United Kingdom) Jac Constable
3	R7	Oulton Park (Island Circuit, Cheshire)	20 May	(United Kingdom) Jack Mitchell	(United Kingdom) Carl Boardley	(United Kingdom) Tom Hibbert	Privateer	(United Kingdom) Colin White
3	R8	Oulton Park (Island Circuit, Cheshire)	21 May		(United Kingdom) Callum Pointon	(United Kingdom) Tom Hibbert	Privateer	(United Kingdom) Jac Constable
4	R9	Croft Circuit (North Yorkshire)	10 June	(United Kingdom) Carl Boardley	(United Kingdom) George Gamble	(United Kingdom) Ben Green	Century Motorsport	(United Kingdom) Jac Constable
4	R10	Croft Circuit (North Yorkshire)	11 June		(United Kingdom) George Gamble	(United Kingdom) Ben Green	Century Motorsport	(United Kingdom) Jac Constable
4	R11	Croft Circuit (North Yorkshire)	11 June		(United Kingdom) Tom Roche	(United Kingdom) Tom Roche	Rob Boston Racing	(United Kingdom) Jac Constable
5	R12	Snetterton Circuit (300 Circuit, Norfolk)	29 July	(United Kingdom) Jack Mitchell	(United Kingdom) Callum Pointon	(United Kingdom) Callum Pointon	HHC Motorsport	(United Kingdom) Jac Constable
5	R13	Snetterton Circuit (300 Circuit, Norfolk)	30 July		(United Kingdom) Ben Green	(United Kingdom) Declan Jones	Rob Boston Racing	(United Kingdom) Jac Constable
5	R14	Snetterton Circuit (300 Circuit, Norfolk)	30 July		(United Kingdom) Tom Hibbert	(United Kingdom) Carl Boardley	Xentek Motorsport	(United Kingdom) Jac Constable
6	R15	Rockingham Motor Speedway (International Super Sports Car Circuit, Northamptonshire)	26 August	(United Kingdom) Declan Jones	(United Kingdom) George Gamble	(United Kingdom) Ben Green	Century Motorsport	(United Kingdom) Jack Minshaw
6	R16	Rockingham Motor Speedway (International Super Sports Car Circuit, Northamptonshire)	27 August		(United Kingdom) Callum Pointon	(United Kingdom) Ben Green	Century Motorsport	(United Kingdom) Jac Constable
6	R17	Rockingham Motor Speedway (International Super Sports Car Circuit, Northamptonshire)	27 August		(United Kingdom) George Gamble	(United Kingdom) Declan Jones	Rob Boston Racing	(United Kingdom) Jac Constable
7	R18	Silverstone Circuit (National Circuit, Northamptonshire)	16 September	(United Kingdom) Jack Mitchell	(United Kingdom) Jack Mitchell	(United Kingdom) Ben Green	Century Motorsport	(United Kingdom) Jac Constable
7	R19	Silverstone Circuit (National Circuit, Northamptonshire)	17 September		(United Kingdom) Jack Mitchell	(United Kingdom) Jack Mitchell	Rob Boston Racing	(United Kingdom) Colin White
7	R20	Silverstone Circuit (National Circuit, Northamptonshire)	17 September		(United Kingdom) Declan Jones	(United Kingdom) George Gamble	Rob Boston Racing	(United Kingdom) Jac Constable
8	R21	Brands Hatch (Grand Prix Circuit, Kent)	30 September	(United Kingdom) Ben Green	(United Kingdom) Jack Mitchell	(United Kingdom) Ben Green	Century Motorsport	(United Kingdom) Colin White
8	R22	Brands Hatch (Grand Prix Circuit, Kent)	1 October		(United Kingdom) Jack Mitchell	(United Kingdom) Jack Mitchell	Rob Boston Racing	(United Kingdom) Colin White
8	R23	Brands Hatch (Grand Prix Circuit, Kent)	1 October		(United Kingdom) Carl Boardley	(United Kingdom) George Gamble	Rob Boston Racing	(United Kingdom) Colin White

== Championship standings ==
=== Drivers' championships ===
Points system
1st	2nd	3rd	4th	5th	6th	7th	8th	9th	10th	11th	12th	13th	14th	15th	16th	17th	18th	19th	20th	R1 PP	FL
35	30	26	22	20	18	16	14	12	11	10	9	8	7	6	5	4	3	2	1	1	1

Notes

- A driver's best 22 scores counted towards the championship, with any other points being discarded.

Pos	Driver	BHI			DON			OUL		CRO			SNE			ROC			SIL			BHGP			Total	Pen.	Drop	Points
Professional
1	(United Kingdom) Callum Pointon	5	2	2	1	11	2	3	2	5	3	2	1	2	2	3	2	5	3	6	7	6	8	DNS	556	-6	0	550
2	(United Kingdom) Ben Green	2	Ret	Ret	8	2	1	Ret	4	1	1	15	3	3	5	1	1	11	1	5	8	1	3	2	528	0	0	528
3	(United Kingdom) George Gamble	1	10	1	Ret	7	9	5	5	2	2	3	Ret	7	8	2	6	4	6	2	1	4	4	1	508	-12	0	496
4	(United Kingdom) Declan Jones	8	Ret	4	4	3	3	Ret	7	16	7	6	5	1	7	Ret	4	1	4	13	4	2	2	4	440	0	0	440
5	(United Kingdom) Jack Mitchell	4	1	7				2	3				2	4	4	5	3	2	9	1	5	3	1	3	442	-6	0	436
6	(United Kingdom) Tom Hibbert	7	4	Ret	6	4	6	1	1	4	Ret	4	7	6	3	Ret	7	6	5	3	3	7	7	6	427	0	0	427
7	(United Kingdom) Charlie Ladell	10	7	3	3	6	18	Ret	19	7	5	5	8	8	6	4	9	7	7	4	2	8	6	5	392	0	0	392
8	(United Kingdom) Carl Boardley	3	3	Ret	5	13	5	4	Ret	9	Ret	DNS	6	5	1	Ret	5	3	2	Ret	13	5	5	8	352	0	0	352
9	(United Kingdom) Reece Somerfield	9	6	6	Ret	5	7	Ret	6	6	8	Ret	4	9	9	6	10	Ret	10	8	6	11	Ret	7	285	0	0	285
10	(United Kingdom) Seb Perez	6	8	5	9	10	11	9	11	8	11	7	10	10	Ret	14	11	9	12	16	12	12	13	9	287	-6	0	281
11	(United Kingdom) Adam Higgins	16	15	Ret	7	12	8	6	13	10	14	11	9	16	Ret				14	14	17	14	9	11	212	-6	0	206
12	(United Kingdom) Tom Roche				2	1	4			3	4	1													172	0	0	172
13	(United Kingdom) Jason Baker															8	8	8	8	12	9	10	14	10	117	-18	0	99
Amateur
1	(United Kingdom) Jac Constable	13	Ret	8	13	9	10	11	8	11	6	8	11	11	10	10	12	10	11	Ret	10	13	11	Ret	655	-6	0	649
2	(United Kingdom) Colin White	11	5	DNS	10	8	13	7	9	13	10	10	12	12	12	9	Ret	16	13	7	11	9	10	12	650	-6	0	644
3	(United Kingdom) Jack Minshaw	12	9	10	Ret	Ret	16	10	12	14	9	12	14	13	14	7	14	13	17	10	14	Ret	12	13	510	-6	0	504
4	(United Kingdom) Ian Robinson	Ret	14	11	14	17	12	14	18	15	12	9	Ret	Ret	13	11	15	12	15	11	15	17	18	15	432	0	0	432
5	(United Kingdom) Alexis Taylor	17	12	12	11	16	17	15	17	18	Ret	DNS	15	15	Ret	Ret	13	14	21	9	19	16	16	19	376	-18	0	358
6	(United Kingdom) Dan Kirby	15	13	9	12	14	Ret	12	14	12	13	13	13	14	11	Ret	Ret	Ret	22	19	21	Ret	Ret	17	366	-18	0	348
7	(United Kingdom) David Brooks	18	11	14	15	15	14	13	16	Ret	15	16	16	Ret	Ret	12	Ret	15	16	20	Ret	19	Ret	18	312	0	0	312
8	(United Kingdom) Toby Bearne															13	16	Ret	20	18	18	15	15	14	160	0	0	160
9	(United Kingdom) Andy Wilmot				13	18	Ret	16	15	17	16	14													120	-6	0	114
10	(United Kingdom) Paul Taylor																		18	17	16	18	17	16	112	0	0	112
11	(United Kingdom) Grahame Tilley	14	Ret	13	Ret	Ret	15																		61	0	0	61
12	(United Kingdom) Jason Baker							8	10																57	0	0	57
13	(United Kingdom) Fraser Robertson																		19	15	20				50	0	0	50
14	(United Kingdom) Gary Lancashire									19	17	17													42	0	0	42
Pos	Driver	BHI			DON			OUL		CRO			SNE			ROC			SIL			BHGP			Total	Pen.	Drop	Points
