= 2022 TCR UK Touring Car Championship =

Motor racing competition

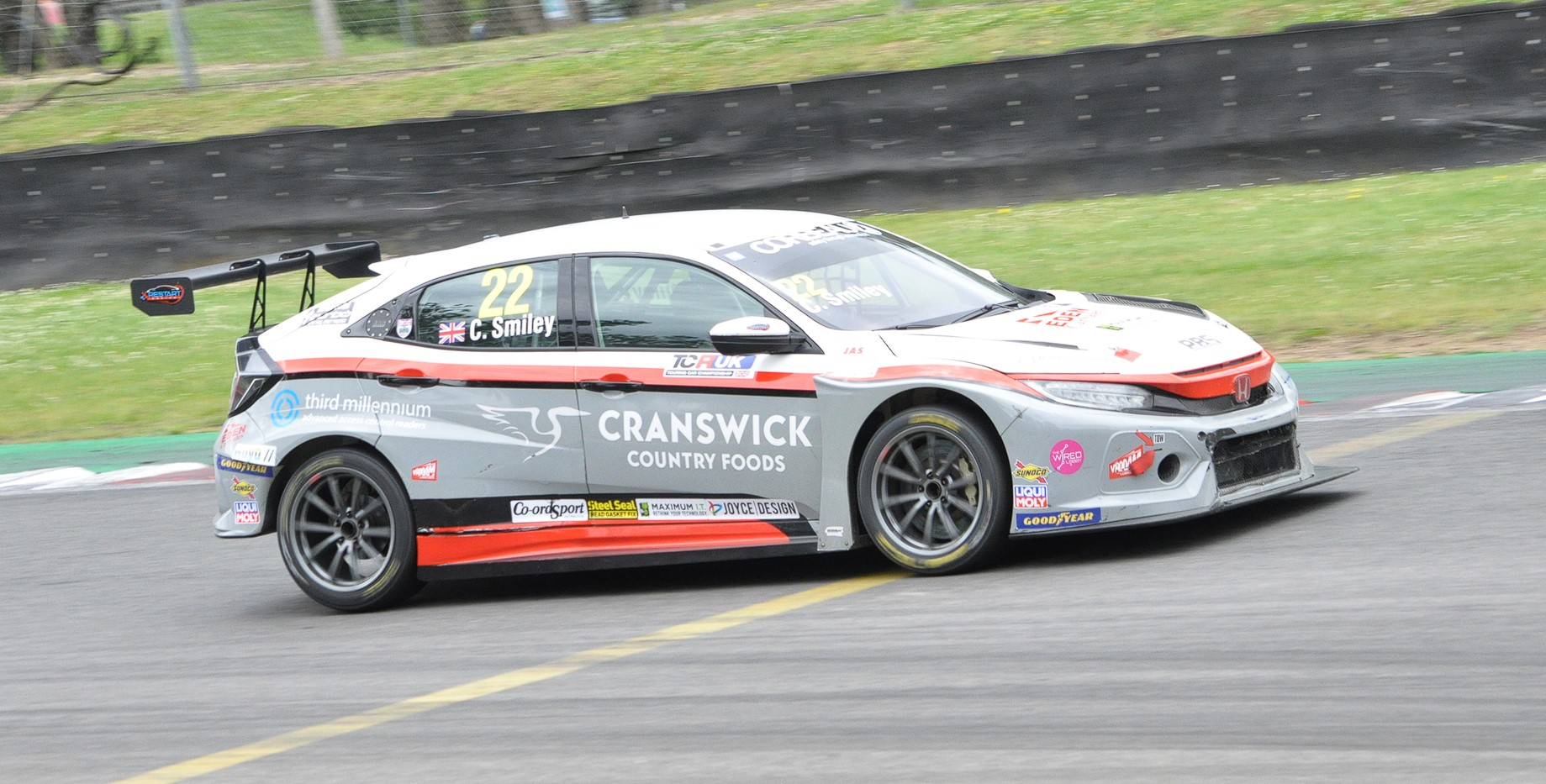
Chris Smiley won the Drivers' Championship.

The 2022 TCR UK Touring Car Championship was the fifth season of the TCR UK Touring Car Championship. The championship featured production-based touring cars built to TCR specifications and was held over fifteen races across seven meetings throughout England. The championship was operated by Stewart Lines' Maximum Group.

== Calendar ==
A new calendar was announced commencing on 16 April 2022 with 15 rounds scheduled.

Rnd.		Circuit/Location	Date
1	1	Oulton Park (International), Cheshire	16–18 April
1	2	Oulton Park (International), Cheshire	16–18 April
2	3	Donington Park (GP), Leicestershire	28–29 May
2	4	Donington Park (GP), Leicestershire	28–29 May
3	5	Brands Hatch (Indy), Kent	18–19 June
3	6	Brands Hatch (Indy), Kent	18–19 June
3	7	Brands Hatch (Indy), Kent	18–19 June
4	8	Oulton Park, Cheshire	16 July
4	9	Oulton Park, Cheshire	16 July
5	10	Castle Combe Circuit, Wiltshire	6 August
5	11	Castle Combe Circuit, Wiltshire	6 August
6	12	Donington Park (National), Leicestershire	29 August
6	13	Donington Park (National), Leicestershire	29 August
7	14	Snetterton Circuit (200 Circuit), Norfolk)	23 October
7	15	Snetterton Circuit (200 Circuit), Norfolk)	23 October

== Teams and drivers ==
Team	Car	No.	Drivers	Class	Rounds
(United Kingdom) Essex & Kent Motorsport	Hyundai Veloster N TCR	1	(United Kingdom) Lewis Kent		All
(United Kingdom) Essex & Kent Motorsport	Hyundai i30 N TCR	5	(United Kingdom) Bradley Kent		All
(United Kingdom) Essex & Kent Motorsport	Hyundai i30 N TCR	27	(United Kingdom) Scott Sumpton		All
(United Kingdom) JamSport Racing	Subaru WRX STI TCR	11	(United Kingdom) Ant Whorton-Eales		1–6
(United Kingdom) JamSport Racing	Cupra León TCR	40	(United Kingdom) Simon Tomlinson	D	1
(United Kingdom) JamSport Racing	Hyundai i30 N TCR	101	(Republic of Ireland) Max Hart		1–6
(United Kingdom) JamSport Racing	Hyundai i30 N TCR	210	(United Kingdom) Andy Wilmot	D	1–6
(United Kingdom) JamSport Racing with Shepherd Motors	Hyundai i30 N TCR	117	(United Kingdom) Adam Shepherd		1–3
(United Kingdom) Area Motorsport with Shepherd Motors	Hyundai i30 N TCR	117	(United Kingdom) Adam Shepherd		4–7
(United Kingdom) Chameleon Motorsport	Cupra León TCR	12	(United Kingdom) Neil Trotter	D	2–6
(United Kingdom) Chameleon Motorsport	Cupra León Competición TCR	12	(United Kingdom) Neil Trotter	D	7
(United Kingdom) Chameleon Motorsport	Cupra León Competición TCR	39	(United Kingdom) Lewis Brown		7
(United Kingdom) Power Maxed Racing	Cupra León TCR	16	(United Kingdom) Callum Newsham		1, 3–7
(United Kingdom) Power Maxed Racing	Cupra León TCR	72	(United Kingdom) Russell Joyce	D	1–3, 6–7
(United Kingdom) Power Maxed Racing	Cupra León TCR	257	(United Kingdom) Jac Constable		All
(United Kingdom) Power Maxed Racing	Hyundai i30 N TCR	52	(United Kingdom) Chris Wallis	D	1–3, 6–7
(United Kingdom) bond-It with MPHR	Audi RS3 LMS TCR (2017)	17	(United Kingdom) Bradley Hutchison		All
(United Kingdom) Area Motorsport with FastR	Cupra León TCR	21	(United Kingdom) Jessica Hawkins		1–6
(United Kingdom) Area Motorsport with FastR	Cupra León TCR	74	(United Kingdom) Jamie Tonks		1–6
(United Kingdom) Area Motorsport	Cupra León TCR	37	(United Kingdom) Bruce Winfield		1–6
(United Kingdom) Area Motorsport	Hyundai i30 N TCR	37	(United Kingdom) Bruce Winfield		7
(United Kingdom) Area Motorsport	Hyundai i30 N TCR	210	(United Kingdom) Andy Wilmot	D	7
(United Kingdom) Area Motorsport with Daniel James	Hyundai i30 N TCR	76	(United Kingdom) Alex Ley		7
(United Kingdom) Restart Racing	Honda Civic Type R TCR (FK8)	22	(United Kingdom) Chris Smiley		All
(United Kingdom) Simpson Motorsport	Audi RS3 LMS TCR (2017)	29	(United Kingdom) Hugo Cook		1–2
(United Kingdom) JWB Motorsport	Cupra León Competición TCR	31	(United Kingdom) Matthew Wilson		All
(United Kingdom) JWB Motorsport	Volkswagen Golf GTI TCR	47	(United Kingdom) Kieran Griffin	D	1
(United Kingdom) JWB Motorsport with Maximum Networks	Volkswagen Golf GTI TCR	94	(Republic of Ireland) Rob Butler		1
(United Kingdom) Garage 81 with Maximum Networks	Volkswagen Golf GTI TCR	94	(Republic of Ireland) Rob Butler		2
(United Kingdom) Capture Motorsport	Volkswagen Golf GTI TCR	33	(United Kingdom) Jack Depper		1–3
(United Kingdom) PlayerLands	Audi RS3 LMS TCR (2017)	35	(United Kingdom) Steve Gales	D	1
(United Kingdom) Welch Motorsport	Audi RS3 LMS TCR (2017)	35	(United Kingdom) Steve Gales	D	2–3
(United Kingdom) MPHR	Audi RS3 LMS TCR (2017)	35	(United Kingdom) Steve Gales	D	6–7
(United Kingdom) MPHR	Volkswagen Golf GTI TCR	35	(United Kingdom) Steve Gales	D	5
(United Kingdom) DW Racing	Vauxhall Astra TCR	50	(United Kingdom) Darelle Wilson		All
(United Kingdom) Daniel James Motorsport	Hyundai i30 N TCR	76	(United Kingdom) Alex Ley		2–6
(United Kingdom) Richmond Fire Motorsport	Cupra León TCR	77	(United Kingdom) Mark Smith	D	2, 6
(United Kingdom) Race Car Consultants	Volkswagen Golf GTI TCR	123	(United Kingdom) Isaac Smith		All
Entries ineligible to score points
(United Kingdom) Team HARD. with GO FIX	Cupra León TCR	28	(United Kingdom) George Jaxon		7
(United Kingdom) T4 Motorsport	Cupra León TCR	63	(United Kingdom) Mark Havers	D	7
(United Kingdom) Paul Sheard Racing	Volkswagen Golf GTI TCR	78	(United Kingdom) Jonathon Beeson		7
(United Kingdom) Paul Sheard Racing	Volkswagen Golf GTI TCR	87	(United Kingdom) George Heler		6
(United Kingdom) Darron Lewis Racing	Audi RS3 LMS TCR (2017)	285	(United Kingdom) Darron Lewis	D	6

Icon	Class
D	Eligible for Goodyear Diamond Trophy

=== Driver changes ===
Entering/Re-Entering TCR UK

- Scott Sumpton joined Essex & Kent Motorsport driving a Hyundai i30 N TCR.
- Former Renault Clio Cup UK and Mini Challenge UK champion Ant Whorton-Eales would enter a Subaru WRX STI TCR with JamSport Racing.
- Former Volkswagen Racing Cup competitor Simon Tomlinson also joined JamSport Racing driving a Cupra León TCR.
- Another driver to join JamSport Racing would be former Ginetta GT4 Supercup racer Adam Shepherd driving a Hyundai i30 N TCR.
- Having entered sporadically in 2021, Andy Wilmot would join for the full season in another JamSport Racing run Hyundai i30 N TCR.
- Callum Newsham, the son of former BTCC race winner Dave Newsham, would race for Power Maxed Racing alongside former Volkswagen Racing Cup driver Russell Joyce, with both driving Cupra León TCR's.
- Having entered a single round in 2021, Chris Wallis was announced for a full season campaign with Power Maxed Racing in a Hyundai i30 N TCR.
- Mini Challenge UK race winner Brad Hutchinson joined the grid driving a family run Audi RS 3 LMS TCR.
- Aston Martin Cognizant F1 Team driver ambassador Jessica Hawkins would drive an Area Motorsport run Cupra León TCR alongside Miltek Civic Cup race winner Jamie Tonks.
- Former BTCC race winner Chris Smiley entered the season with Restart Racing in a Honda Civic Type R TCR (FK8).
- Hugo Cook announced his return, after a late season entry in 2021, in his family run Audi RS 3 LMS TCR.
- Another driver graduating from the Volkswagen Racing Cup was Matthew Wilson who would debut with JWB Motorsport in a brand new Cupra León Competición TCR. He would be joined at the opening round by Kieran Griffin and Miltek Civic Cup front runner, Rob Butler, both driving a Volkswagen Golf GTI TCR.
- Having entered the second half of the 2021 season, Jack Depper announced a return for the full campaign driving for Capture Motorsport in a Volkswagen Golf GTI TCR.
- Steve Gales entered the championship for the first time. He was initially slated to run a Volkswagen Golf GTI TCR but would arrive at the first round with an Audi RS 3 LMS TCR.
- Darelle Wilson would enter the full season with his family run Vauxhall Astra TCR. He would remain one of only 2 drivers to appear in every season of TCR UK.
- Teenager Alex Ley was announced for a late season entry driving a Daniel James Motorsport run Hyundai i30 N TCR.
- Having entered the final event in 2021, Isaac Smith joined for the full season in a family run Volkswagen Golf GTI TCR.

Changed Teams

- With Motus One Racing leaving the championship, Max Hart joined JamSport Racing driving a Hyundai i30 N TCR.

Leaving TCR UK

- 2 of Power Maxed Racing's 2021 entries, Dan Kirby and William Butler, failed to return.
- Having entered the opening rounds in 2021, Motus One Managing Director Will Powell left to race in the BTCC. His teammate at Motus One, Danny Krywyj also failed to return.
- Having done selected events in 2021, Alex Morgan, Alex Kite, Tom Hibbert, Jamie Sturges, Toby Bearne and Daniel Wylie all did not return.

=== Team changes ===
- Essex & Kent Motorsport expanded to 3 cars with defending double champion Lewis Kent switching to a Hyundai Veloster N TCR.
- Area Motorsport would expand to 3 Cupra León TCR's.

=== Mid-season changes ===
- Simon Tomlinson & Kieran Griffin left the series after the opening round.
- Neil Trotter and Chameleon Motorsport would enter the championship from the second round onwards with a Cupra León TCR.
- Rob Butler would switch to Garage 81 for the second round. He would leave the series before the third event, returning to the Miltek Civic Cup.
- Alex Ley entered the season earlier than announced, appearing from the second round onwards.
- Having appeared in 2 rounds during 2021, Mark Smith returned for both Donington Park meetings with his Cupra León TCR being run under the Richmond Fire Motorsport banner.
- Hugo Cook left the series after round 2.
- Callum Newsham missed the second round due to illness.
- Jack Depper would leave the series after the third round.
- Prior to round 4, Adam Shepherd left JamSport Racing and joined Area Motorsport.
- Both Russell Joyce and Chris Wallis missed round 4 and 5 before both returned for round 6.
- Darron Lewis and George Heler would join the grid for round 6. Lewis would run his Audi RS 3 LMS TCR for his own team while Heler's Volkswagen Golf GTI TCR would be run by Paul Sheard Racing. However, both entries were ineligible to score points.
- Steve Gales' entry changed several times during the season. For the opening round his Audi RS 3 LMS TCR was run under the PlayerLands banner. For rounds 2 & 3 he was entered under the Welch Motorsport banner. He missed round 4 due to damage sustained at the previous round before returning for round 5. This time he would drive a Volkswagen Golf GTI TCR for MPHR. For the final two events, MPHR would continue to run him but he returned to driving an Audi RS 3 LMS TCR.
- Ahead of the final event, both Andy Wilmot and Max Hart announced that they would be leaving JamSport Racing.
- For the season finale, Chameleon Motorsport upgraded and expanded to two Cupra León Competición TCR's for Neil Trotter and Mini Challenge UK racer Lewis Brown.
- Prior to the final round, Area Motorsport announced on social media that Bruce Winfield would switch to a Hyundai i30 N TCR. He would be joined by fellow Hyundai drivers Alex Ley and Andy Wilmot who left Daniel James Motorsport and JamSport Racing respectively.
- For the final 2 races, Jonathon Beeson would race the Paul Sheard Racing Volkswagen Golf GTI TCR.
- For the last 2 races, George Jaxon would race a Team HARD. Cupra León TCR. This was the car run previously by Area Motorsport for Jamie Tonks.
- Area Motorsport with FastR teammates Jessica Hawkins and Jamie Tonks would both miss the final round with both cars being sold beforehand.
- Ant Whorton-Eales would also miss the final event leaving JamSport Racing with 0 entries having started the season with 5.

== Race calendar and results ==
Round	Circuit	Pole position	Fastest lap	Winning driver	Winning team	Diamond Trophy winner
1	Oulton Park International	(United Kingdom) Chris Smiley	(United Kingdom) Chris Smiley	(United Kingdom) Chris Smiley	(United Kingdom) Restart Racing	(United Kingdom) Russell Joyce
1	Oulton Park International		(Republic of Ireland) Max Hart	(United Kingdom) Jessica Hawkins	(United Kingdom) Area Motorsport with FastR	(United Kingdom) Russell Joyce
2	Donington Park Grand Prix	(United Kingdom) Chris Smiley	(Republic of Ireland) Max Hart	(Republic of Ireland) Max Hart	(United Kingdom) JamSport Racing	(United Kingdom) Russell Joyce
2	Donington Park Grand Prix		(Republic of Ireland) Max Hart	(Republic of Ireland) Max Hart	(United Kingdom) JamSport Racing	(United Kingdom) Andy Wilmot
3	Brands Hatch	(United Kingdom) Bradley Kent	(United Kingdom) Callum Newsham	(United Kingdom) Lewis Kent	(United Kingdom) Essex & Kent Motorsport	(United Kingdom) Russell Joyce
3	Brands Hatch		(United Kingdom) Bradley Kent	(United Kingdom) Jac Constable	(United Kingdom) Power Maxed Racing	(United Kingdom) Russell Joyce
3	Brands Hatch	(United Kingdom) Alex Ley (Note: Grid positions were decided by a drivers second fastest time in qualifying. No points were awarded.)	(United Kingdom) Alex Ley	(United Kingdom) Alex Ley	(United Kingdom) Daniel James Motorsport	(United Kingdom) Andy Wilmot
4	Oulton Park Island	(United Kingdom) Alex Ley (Note: Max Hart initially qualified on Pole Position but was demoted to last with a further 10 second delayed start due to a technical infringement.)	(United Kingdom) Alex Ley	(United Kingdom) Alex Ley	(United Kingdom) Daniel James Motorsport	(United Kingdom) Andy Wilmot
4	Oulton Park Island		(Republic of Ireland) Max Hart	(United Kingdom) Jamie Tonks	(United Kingdom) Area Motorsport with FastR	(United Kingdom) Andy Wilmot
5	Castle Combe Circuit	(United Kingdom) Chris Smiley	(United Kingdom) Chris Smiley	(United Kingdom) Bruce Winfield	(United Kingdom) Area Motorsport	(United Kingdom) Neil Trotter (Note: Andy Wilmot initially won the Diamond Trophy but was later disqualified due to a technical infringement.)
5	Castle Combe Circuit		(United Kingdom) Chris Smiley	(United Kingdom) Alex Ley (Note: Jac Constable crossed the line first but was handed a 10 second penalty for a jump start which dropped him to third.)	(United Kingdom) Daniel James Motorsport	(United Kingdom) Andy Wilmot
6	Donington Park National	(United Kingdom) Adam Shepherd	(United Kingdom) Adam Shepherd	(United Kingdom) Adam Shepherd	(United Kingdom) Area Motorsport with Shepherd Motors	(United Kingdom) Andy Wilmot
6	Donington Park National		(United Kingdom) Jac Constable	(United Kingdom) Jac Constable (Note: Andy Wilmot initially won the race overall but was disqualified due to a technical infringement.)	(United Kingdom) Power Maxed Racing	(United Kingdom) Darron Lewis (Note: Andy Wilmot initially won the Goodyear Diamond Trophy but was disqualified due to a technical infringement. However as Darron Lewis was a guest entry, the full 25 points would be awarded to Neil Trotter.)
7	Snetterton Circuit	(United Kingdom) Chris Smiley	(United Kingdom) Isaac Smith	(United Kingdom) Chris Smiley	(United Kingdom) Restart Racing	(United Kingdom) Andy Wilmot (Note: Russell Joyce initially won the Goodyear Diamond Trophy but was penalised 3 places for causing a collision handing the win to Andy Wilmot.)
7	Snetterton Circuit		(United Kingdom) Chris Smiley	(United Kingdom) Lewis Kent	(United Kingdom) Essex & Kent Motorsport	(United Kingdom) Andy Wilmot

== Championship standings ==
=== Drivers' standings ===
Points system
Position	1st	2nd	3rd	4th	5th	6th	7th	8th	9th	10th	11th	12th	13th	14th	15th	Fastest lap
Qualifying	6	5	4	3	2	1	—N/a									
Race	40	35	30	27	24	21	18	15	13	11	9	7	5	3	1	1

- Drivers' top 13 results from the 15 races count towards the championship. Drivers cannot drop scores from the final 2 races at Snetterton.

Pos	Driver	OUL1		DON1		BRH			OUL2		CAS		DON2		SNE		Total	Drop	Points
1	(United Kingdom) Chris Smiley	1 ^{1 FL}	5	14 ^{1}	2	2	Ret	8	4 ^{5}	4	5 ^{1 FL}	4 ^{FL}	3 ^{2}	Ret	1 ^{1}	3 ^{FL}	392	0	392
2	(United Kingdom) Isaac Smith	3 ^{2}	4	3 ^{5}	7	4	2	4	3 ^{4}	3	4	6	7	7	2 ^{5 FL}	7	407	36	371
3	(United Kingdom) Bruce Winfield	4 ^{3}	15	18	3	11 ^{6}	17	7	7	2	1 ^{3}	2	2 ^{6}	4	6	8	321	0	321
4	(United Kingdom) Lewis Kent	5 ^{5}	6	4 ^{6}	8	1 ^{3}	3	3	9	11	Ret	9	6	Ret	7	1	313	0	313
5	(United Kingdom) Jac Constable	6	Ret	12	6	7	1	Ret	Ret ^{3}	9	9	3	4 ^{5}	1 ^{FL}	5	2	296	0	296
6	(United Kingdom) Alex Ley			6	DSQ	6 ^{2}	19	1 ^{P FL}	1 ^{1 FL}	8	8	1	5 ^{4}	10	8 ^{2}	4	294	0	294
7	(United Kingdom) Adam Shepherd	12 ^{6}	8	Ret ^{3}	16	12 ^{5}	Ret	2	2 ^{2}	5	2 ^{2}	8	1 ^{1 FL}	2	Ret	DNS	289	0	289
8	(Republic of Ireland) Max Hart	2 ^{4}	2 ^{FL}	1 ^{4 FL}	1 ^{FL}	8	5	5	Ret	Ret ^{FL}	Ret	Ret	Ret ^{3}	Ret			226	0	226
9	(United Kingdom) Bradley Hutchinson	Ret	9	7	5	15	4	6	8	Ret	3 ^{5}	Ret	DNS	DNS	3 ^{3}	6	206	0	206
10	(United Kingdom) Callum Newsham	7	3			3 ^{4 FL}	6	11	12 ^{6}	12	7	10	Ret	Ret	4 ^{6}	Ret	184	0	184
11	(United Kingdom) Jamie Tonks	10	13 ^{P}	5	4	Ret	8	18	5	1	Ret	Ret	8	6			183	0	183
12	(United Kingdom) Matthew Wilson	11	10	9	Ret	17	14	13	10	7 ^{P}	10	9 ^{P}	9	14	10	10 ^{P}	132	0	132
13	(United Kingdom) Andy Wilmot	Ret	Ret	13	9	13	10	9	6	6	DSQ	11	10	DSQ^{P}	12	9	131	0	131
14	(United Kingdom) Jessica Hawkins	9	1	Ret	10	Ret	11	10	Ret	Ret	6	5	DNS	DNS			129	0	129
15	(United Kingdom) Bradley Kent	Ret	Ret	2	DNS	10 ^{1}	20 ^{P FL}	14	Ret	Ret	Ret ^{4}	DNS	11	3	Ret ^{4}	5	125	0	125
16	(United Kingdom) Russell Joyce	15	11	11	11	12	9	Ret					12	11	13	DNS	75	0	75
17	(United Kingdom) Neil Trotter			16	12	16	13	Ret	Ret	13	11	13	15	9	WD	WD	54	0	54
18	(United Kingdom) Darelle Wilson	13	Ret	Ret	Ret	Ret	7	15	Ret	10	Ret	DNS	DNS	Ret	9	Ret	48	0	48
19	(United Kingdom) Jack Depper	8	7	19	DSQ	14	12	17									43	0	43
20	(United Kingdom) Ant Whorton-Eales	Ret	14	8	Ret	9	Ret	Ret	11	Ret	Ret	Ret	Ret	Ret			40	0	40
21	(United Kingdom) Scott Sumpton	14	12	10	17 ^{P}	18	16	12	Ret	Ret	DSQ ^{6}	12	Ret	DNS	DNS	DNS	36	0	36
22	(United Kingdom) Steve Gales	16	18	Ret	13	DNS	18	Ret			12	14	17	15	WD	WD	21	0	21
23	(United Kingdom) Chris Wallis	19	17	15	14	Ret	15	16					16	12	WD	WD	19	0	19
24	(United Kingdom) Mark Smith			17	15								18	13			10	0	10
25	(United Kingdom) Hugo Cook	WD	WD	Ret ^{2}	DNS												5	0	5
26	(United Kingdom) Simon Tomlinson	17	16														0	0	0
27	(United Kingdom) Kieran Griffin	18	Ret														0	0	0
–	(Republic of Ireland) Rob Butler	Ret	Ret	Ret	DNS												0	0	0
–	(United Kingdom) Lewis Brown														WD	WD	0	0	0
Drivers ineligible to score points
	(United Kingdom) George Heler												14	5			0	0	0
	(United Kingdom) Darron Lewis												13	8			0	0	0
	(United Kingdom) Jonathon Beeson														11	Ret	0	0	0
	(United Kingdom) George Jaxon														Ret	11	0	0	0
	(United Kingdom) Mark Havers														Ret	12	0	0	0
Pos	Driver	OUL1		DON1		BRH			OUL2		CAS		DON2		SNE		Total	Drop	Points

=== Goodyear Diamond Trophy Standings ===
Pos	Driver	OUL1		DON1		BRH			OUL2		CAS		DON2		SNE		Points
1	(United Kingdom) Andy Wilmot	Ret ^{1 FL}	Ret	13 ^{1}	9 ^{FL}	13 ^{2}	10	9 ^{FL}	6 ^{1 FL}	6 ^{FL}	DSQ ^{1}	11 ^{FL}	10	DSQ	12 ^{1}	9 ^{FL}	466
2	(United Kingdom) Russell Joyce	15 ^{2}	11 ^{FL}	11 ^{2 FL}	11	12 ^{1 FL}	9 ^{FL}	Ret					12 ^{1 FL}	11 ^{FL}	13 ^{2 FL}	DNS	375
3	(United Kingdom) Neil Trotter			16 ^{5}	12	16 ^{3}	13	Ret	Ret ^{2}	10	11 ^{3 FL}	13	15 ^{6}	10	WD	WD	315
4	(United Kingdom) Steve Gales	16 ^{4}	18	Ret ^{3}	13	DNS ^{5}	18	Ret			12 ^{2}	14	17 ^{4}	15	WD	WD	220
5	(United Kingdom) Chris Wallis	19 ^{6}	17	15 ^{4}	14	Ret ^{4}	15	16					16 ^{3}	12	WD	WD	177
6	(United Kingdom) Mark Smith			17 ^{6}	15								18 ^{5}	13			97
7	(United Kingdom) Simon Tomlinson	17 ^{5}	16														67
8	(United Kingdom) Kieran Griffin	18 ^{3}	Ret														31
Drivers ineligible to score points
9	(United Kingdom) Darron Lewis												13	8			0
10	(United Kingdom) Mark Havers														Ret	12	0
Pos	Driver	OUL1		DON1		BRH			OUL2		CAS		DON2		SNE		Points
