= 2021 Touring Car Trophy =

Car race

The 2021 Goodyear Touring Car Trophy was the third season of the Touring Car Trophy. The championship features production-based touring cars built to either NGTC, TCR or Super 2000 specifications and will compete in fourteen races across seven meetings across England. The championship is aimed as a feeder category to the BTCC and operated by Stewart Lines' Maximum Group.

== Calendar ==
A new calendar was announced on 2 April 2021 with 12 rounds scheduled.

Rnd.		Circuit/Location	Date
1	1	Silverstone Circuit (International), Northamptonshire	25 April
1	2	Silverstone Circuit (International), Northamptonshire	25 April
2	3	Castle Combe Circuit, Wiltshire	31 May
2	4	Castle Combe Circuit, Wiltshire	31 May
3	5	Brands Hatch (Indy), Kent	19–20 June
3	6	Brands Hatch (Indy), Kent	19–20 June
3	7	Brands Hatch (Indy), Kent	19–20 June
4	8	Oulton Park, Cheshire	17 July
4	9	Oulton Park, Cheshire	17 July
5	10	Anglesey Circuit, Anglesey	8 August
5	11	Anglesey Circuit, Anglesey	8 August
6	12	Donington Park (National), Leicestershire	30 August
6	13	Donington Park (National), Leicestershire	30 August
6	14	Donington Park (National), Leicestershire	30 August

== Teams and drivers ==
Team	Car	No.	Drivers	Rounds
TCR entries
Power Maxed Racing	CUPRA León TCR	4	(United Kingdom) Dan Kirby	All
Power Maxed Racing	CUPRA León TCR	5	(United Kingdom) Alex Morgan	4, 6
Power Maxed Racing	CUPRA León TCR	11	(United Kingdom) Jac Constable	All
Power Maxed Racing	CUPRA León TCR	70	(United Kingdom) William Butler	All
Power Maxed Racing	Hyundai i30 N TCR	52	(United Kingdom) Chris Wallis	3
Simpson Motorsport	Audi RS3 LMS TCR	9	(United Kingdom) Hugo Cook	4–6
Simpson Motorsport	Audi RS3 LMS TCR	138	(United Kingdom) Hugo Cook	1
Motus One Racing	CUPRA León TCR	14	(United Kingdom) Danny Krywyj	1–2
Motus One Racing	Hyundai i30 N TCR	14	(United Kingdom) Danny Krywyj	4–6
DW Racing	Vauxhall Astra TCR	21	(United Kingdom) Andy Wilmot	1
DW Racing	Vauxhall Astra TCR	50	(United Kingdom) Darelle Wilson	2, 6
DW Racing	Vauxhall Astra TCR	97	(United Kingdom) Alex Kite	3
Maximum Motorsport	CUPRA León TCR	21	(United Kingdom) Andy Wilmot	4, 6
Maximum Motorsport	Volkswagen Golf GTI TCR	33	(United Kingdom) Jack Depper	4–6
Maximum Motorsport	Vauxhall Astra TCR	97	(United Kingdom) Alex Kite	4–5
Maximum Motorsport with Motus One Racing	Hyundai i30 N TCR	77	(United Kingdom) Will Powell	1–3
Maximum Motorsport with Motus One Racing	Hyundai i30 N TCR	101	(Republic of Ireland) Max Hart	All
Area Motorsport	CUPRA León TCR	37	(United Kingdom) Bruce Winfield	All
Essex & Kent Motorsport	Hyundai i30 N TCR	38	(United Kingdom) Lewis Kent	All
Essex & Kent Motorsport	Hyundai i30 N TCR	44	(United Kingdom) Bradley Kent	All
Rob Boston Racing	Vauxhall Astra TCR	81	(United Kingdom) Tom Hibbert	6
Grant Motorsport	CUPRA León TCR	97	(United Kingdom) Alex Kite	2
Zest Racecar Engineering	Volkswagen Golf GTI TCR	99	(United Kingdom) Jamie Sturges	4
Zest Racecar Engineering	CUPRA León TCR	123	(United Kingdom) Isaac Smith	6
Privateer	CUPRA León TCR	77	(United Kingdom) Mark Smith	4, 6
NGTC entries
Team HARD.	Mercedes-Benz A-Class	15	(United Kingdom) Toby Bearne	1–3
Team HARD.	Mercedes-Benz A-Class	285	(United Kingdom) Darron Lewis	1–4
Team HARD.	BMW 125i M Sport	69	(United Kingdom) Daniel Wylie	2–3

== Race calendar and results ==
Round	Circuit	Pole position	Fastest lap	Winning driver	Winning team	TCR UK winner
1	Silverstone Circuit	(Republic of Ireland) Max Hart	(Republic of Ireland) Max Hart	(Republic of Ireland) Max Hart	Maximum with Motus One	(Republic of Ireland) Max Hart
1	Silverstone Circuit		(United Kingdom) Lewis Kent	(United Kingdom) Lewis Kent	Essex & Kent Motorsport	(United Kingdom) Lewis Kent
2	Castle Combe Circuit	(Republic of Ireland) Max Hart	(United Kingdom) Darron Lewis	(United Kingdom) Darelle Wilson	DW Racing	(United Kingdom) Darelle Wilson
2	Castle Combe Circuit		(Republic of Ireland) Max Hart	(United Kingdom) Bradley Kent	Essex & Kent Motorsport	(United Kingdom) Bradley Kent
3	Brands Hatch	(United Kingdom) Bradley Kent	(United Kingdom) Lewis Kent	(United Kingdom) Dan Kirby	Power Maxed Racing	(United Kingdom) Dan Kirby
3	Brands Hatch		(United Kingdom) Lewis Kent	(United Kingdom) Lewis Kent	Essex & Kent Motorsport	(United Kingdom) Lewis Kent
3	Brands Hatch		(United Kingdom) Bradley Kent	(United Kingdom) Bradley Kent	Essex & Kent Motorsport	(United Kingdom) Bradley Kent
4	Oulton Park	(United Kingdom) Alex Morgan	(United Kingdom) Jac Constable	(United Kingdom) Jac Constable	Power Maxed Racing	(United Kingdom) Jac Constable
4	Oulton Park		(United Kingdom) Bradley Kent	(United Kingdom) Lewis Kent	Essex & Kent Motorsport	(United Kingdom) Lewis Kent
5	Anglesey Circuit	(United Kingdom) Bruce Winfield	(United Kingdom) Bruce Winfield	(United Kingdom) Bruce Winfield	Area Motorsport	(United Kingdom) Bruce Winfield
5	Anglesey Circuit		(United Kingdom) Bradley Kent	(United Kingdom) Bradley Kent	Essex & Kent Motorsport	(United Kingdom) Bradley Kent
6	Donington Park	(United Kingdom) Bruce Winfield	(United Kingdom) Jac Constable	(United Kingdom) Alex Morgan	Power Maxed Racing	(United Kingdom) Alex Morgan
6	Donington Park		(United Kingdom) Bruce Winfield	(United Kingdom) Jac Constable	Power Maxed Racing	(United Kingdom) Jac Constable
6	Donington Park	(United Kingdom) Alex Morgan	(United Kingdom) Bradley Kent	(United Kingdom) Bruce Winfield	Area Motorsport	(United Kingdom) Bruce Winfield

== Championship standings ==
=== Drivers' standings ===
Points system
**1st**	**2nd**	**3rd**	**4th**	**5th**	**6th**	**7th**	**8th**	**9th**	**10th**	**11th**	**12th**	**13th**	**14th**	**15th**	**16th**	All other finishers	All other starters
25	22	20	18	16	14	12	11	10	9	8	7	6	5	4	3	2	1

Pos	Driver	SIL		CAS		BRH			OUL		ANG		DON			Points
1	(United Kingdom) Lewis Kent	2	1	2	2	4	1	3	4	1	4	5	7	6	6	244
2	(United Kingdom) Bruce Winfield	10	7	4	4	5	4	Ret	7	5	**1**	2	**2**	4	1	233
3	(United Kingdom) Dan Kirby	4	3	Ret	Ret	1	2	4	6	4	3	3	6	14	2	225
4	(Republic of Ireland) Max Hart	**1**	2	**DSQ**	3	Ret	6	2	4	3	2	Ret	5	2	10	219
5	(United Kingdom) Bradley Kent	Ret	4	3	1	**Ret**	5	1	3	12	6	1	4	5	Ret	215
6	(United Kingdom) Jac Constable	7	Ret	6	Ret	3	Ret	DNS	1	11	10	4	3	1	Ret	158
7	(United Kingdom) William Butler	6	Ret	8	6	6	Ret	5	Ret	10	7	Ret	14	7	4	136
8	(United Kingdom) Hugo Cook	5	6						11	9	5	Ret	8	8	3	111
9	(United Kingdom) Toby Bearne	8	8	7	Ret	2	3	Ret								78
10	(United Kingdom) Danny Krywyj	9	10	9	Ret				10	Ret	Ret	DNS	10	12	9	72
11	(United Kingdom) Jack Depper								9	6	8	Ret	13	11	8	70
12	(United Kingdom) Darron Lewis	3	5	5	Ret	Ret	Ret	DNS	Ret	8						69
13	(United Kingdom) Andy Wilmot	Ret	9						8	7			9	10	Ret	60
14	(United Kingdom) Darelle Wilson			1	7								Ret	Ret	5	57
15	(United Kingdom) Daniel Wylie			10	8	9	8	Ret								44
16	(United Kingdom) Alex Kite			Ret	5	8	7	Ret	13	Ret	9	Ret				20
17	(United Kingdom) Will Powell	Ret	DNS	Ret	DNS	7	DNS	DNS								14
18	(United Kingdom) Chris Wallis					Ret	Ret	DNS								2
19	(United Kingdom) Tim Docker	WD	WD													0
Guest drivers ineligible to score points
	(United Kingdom) Alex Morgan								**2**	2			1	3	**Ret**	0
	(United Kingdom) Isaac Smith												11	9	7	0
	(United Kingdom) Mark Smith								14	DNS			NC	13	11	0
	(United Kingdom) Jamie Sturges								12	DNS						0
	(United Kingdom) Tom Hibbert												12	Ret	DNS	0
Pos	Driver	SIL		CAS		BRH			OUL		ANG		DON			Points

Key
Colour	Result
Gold	Winner
Silver	Second place
Bronze	Third place
Green	Other points position
Blue	Other classified position
Blue	Not classified, finished (NC)
Purple	Not classified, retired (Ret)
Red	Did not qualify (DNQ)
Red	Did not pre-qualify (DNPQ)
Black	Disqualified (DSQ)
White	Did not start (DNS)
White	Race cancelled (C)
Blank	Did not practice (DNP)
Blank	Excluded (EX)
Blank	Did not arrive (DNA)
Blank	Withdrawn (WD)
Blank	Did not enter (cell empty)
Text formatting	Meaning
**Bold**	Pole position
Italics	Fastest lap
