= Formula Kart Stars =

Former British Karting Championship

Formula Kart Stars was a British-based karting championship, which was supported by Bernie Ecclestone's Formula One Management Ltd, 2008 Formula One World Champion Lewis Hamilton and Lewis’ father Anthony Hamilton.

The championship ceased operation in May 2016 shortly after the first round of the 2016 season.

the championship organisers and officials tried to manipulate the results of the cadet championship in 2003. This was in vain though.

== Champions of the Future ==
In 1995 McLaren Formula One team boss Ron Dennis, Mercedes Motorsport chief Norbert Haug and Zip Kart owner Martin Hines formed the McLaren Mercedes Champions of the Future Series with the aim of bringing karting to a wider audience and providing young British talent with a clear path towards the upper echelons of motorsport and in particular, Formula One.

== Early days ==
In the series’ first season noted touring car specialists BHP produced the television coverage, which was screened on ITV in many of their UK regions with disc jockey and motorsport fan David ‘Kid’ Jensen presenting the programmes. The Championship ran classes for Cadet Comer, Junior Yamaha and Formula Intercontinental A. Champions in the inaugural season were Lewis Hamilton (Cadet), Andrew Delahunty (Yamaha) and Gary Paffett (Intercontinental).

With the class champions getting an invite to the prestigious Autosport Awards Show in London at the end of the year, a young Hamilton took the opportunity to introduce himself to McLaren boss Dennis, a meeting that was the catalyst for McLaren's subsequent signing of Hamilton in 1998 and their continuing relationship thereafter.

Thanks to the involvement of Dennis, Haug and Hines and the terrestrial television coverage the championship was able to attract sponsorship from Highland Spring, TAG Heuer and Mobil 1.

Buoyed by the success of the first season 1997 saw Champions of the Future visit Buckmore Park in Kent, Larkhall in Scotland, Nutts Corner in Northern Ireland, PF International in Lincolnshire and Warden Law in Sunderland. The Royal Automobile Club (RAC), then the governing body in British Karting, also awarded CoF the RAC British Cadet Championship title, a title it retains to the present day.

The links with Formula 1 remained with McLaren Mercedes sponsoring the Formula Yamaha class while computer games company Psygnosis and Mobil 1 sponsored the Cadet and Formula Intercontinental classes respectively.

After finishing third in the inaugural season, Scotsman Paul di Resta became the 1997 RAC British Cadet Champion, beating a field that included James Sutton, Martin Plowman, Oliver Oakes, Craig Dolby, Paul Fowles and Scott Mansell.

Delahunty returned to try to defend his Yamaha title but failed to crack the top ten as Hamilton claimed his second Champions of the Future crown in two years. Hamilton's class rivals included Christian Bakkerud, Joey Foster, Alex Lloyd, Nathan Freke, Ben Hanley and Susie Stoddart.

Stefan Hodgetts, son of former British Touring Car Champion Chris Hodgetts, won the Formula Intercontinental title, narrowly beating Jamie Green and Oliver Jarvis with Luke Hines, Tom Ferrier, Mike Conway, Adam Carroll and Ryan Dalziel all in the top ten in the final standings.

In 1998 Martyn Burridge joined the series as Championship Director with Pat Connolly acting as Championship co-ordinator. ITV continued to broadcast the races, which were now generating several million viewers with ‘Kid’ Jensen still presenting and the always excitable Keith Heuwen on commentary duties.

The coverage was also picked up internationally by NBC's Superchannel and Fox TV while British newspaper The Sun also covered the championship. All the 1997 circuits remained with Rowrah in Cumbria and Rye House in Hoddesdon being added to the calendar.

The RAC Cadet Championship was disputed by the likes of Oakes, Plowman, Dolby, Bradley Ellis, Will Bratt and Oliver Turvey but was won by Adam King. Di Resta moved up from Cadet to Junior Yamaha and came 3rd overall in the championship with Chaz Small 2nd. Despite stiff competition from Rodolfo González, Joey Foster, Alex Mortimer and Sam Bird, Adrian Estasy won the championship, leading the points throughout the whole series.

Formula Intercontinental had by now been re-christened as Junior Intercontinental A (JICA) and counted Hamilton, Bakkerud and Lloyd amongst its number. Fraser Sheader won the title.

== Off track changes ==
1999 saw several significant milestones off the track as Carolynn Hoy, an ex Zip Kart teammate of Hines, former British Karting Championship runner-up and sister-in-law to 1991 British Touring Car Champion Will Hoy joined the Championship as the Championship Director, assuming a role that she retains to the present day. Nigel Edwards, who would serve as the chief Clerk of the Course for the next decade, also joined the series in 1999.

New venues in 1999 included Kimbolton in St Neots and Three Sisters in Wigan at the expense of Warden Law, Rowrah and Rye House as Champions of the Future began its traditional six weekend championship format.

Model car manufacturers Mattel Hot Wheels joined the Cadet Championship as title sponsor for a season that saw future British GT Champion Ellis emerge victorious against a field that also included Plowman, Oakes, Turvey, Bratt, Dolby, Alexander Sims, Riki Christodoulou, Adam Christodoulou and Daniel Rowbottom

The Mobil 1 Junior Yamaha class and the McLaren Mercedes JICA Championship completed the list of 1999 classes with Ian Johnstone triumphant in Yamaha and Russell Parkes winning JICA ahead of Hamilton, Bakkerud, González, di Resta and Pippa Mann.

== Enter Rotax ==
The dawn of the new millennium saw Champions of the Future add a fourth class to its roster with the still-in-its-infancy Junior Rotax joining the established classes.

Having finished sixth in 1999 Jeremy Metcalfe beat a Cadet field that included the Christodoulou cousins, Rowbottom, James Tucker, Stefan Wilson, Dolby, James Calado, Jon Lancaster and Sims.

Reigning Cadet Champion Ellis won the Junior Yamaha division at his first attempt, beating Plowman and Turvey en route to the title while di Resta claimed the JICA title.

Duncan Tappy was among the leading contenders in the inaugural Junior Rotax Champions of the Future season but the title eventually went to Nicky Mitchell.

The 2001 season opened at Paul Fletcher International in Grantham and took in visits to Kimbolton, Larkhall, Buckmore Park, Three Sisters, Rowrah and for the first time, Whilton Mill in Daventry. The Cadet championship was now given the MSA British Formula Cadet title with the Motorsport Association of Great Britain taking over from the RAC.

Calado became MSA British Cadet Champion against a strong field that included Adam Christodoulou, Daniel Rowbottom, Jordan Oakes, Henry Surtees, Alex Brundle, Lewis Williamson, Richard Bradley and Nigel Moore. Christodoulou and Oakes claimed second and third places overall

The Yamaha class was beginning to wane in popularity but still provided a quality field including Simon Walker-Hansell, Jonathan Walker, Ed Hoy and Jack Linfoot although with Rotax now taking a firm foothold on the British karting scene the class’ days were numbered. Jack Anderson would be crowned as the final Junior Yamaha champion in series history.

Di Resta claimed his fourth Champions of the Future title in five years as he claimed JICA honours against the likes of González, Turvey, Sims, Dolby, Ellis and Oliver Oakes.

Inaugural champion Mitchell returned to defend his Junior Rotax title and the class’ growing popularity was highlighted by the calibre of drivers heading down to the Rotax route with Callum MacLeod, Yelmer Buurman, Jason Parrott and Viktor Jensen all competing. Darren Burke beat them all to the title however, followed by James Clink and Adam Wright.

In 2002 the British Racing Drivers Club, then chaired by Martin Brundle, became involved with the Championship for the first time, although it retained its Champions of the Future moniker for a seventh year. Mini Max, a further restricted version of Junior Rotax for drivers aged eleven and upwards, made its debut with the Yamaha class finally disappearing. The series also took in its first visit to the venerable Clay Pigeon circuit in Dorset which, at 815-metres, was the shortest circuit ever to host a CoF event.

After finishing twelfth in 2001 James Bradshaw became the 2002 MSA British Cadet Champion, beating Scott Jenkins and Daniel Smith. The field also included Moore, Surtees, Ollie Millroy, Harry Tincknell, Oliver Rowland, Jake Packun, Dean Stoneman, Bradley, Max Chilton and Will Stevens.

Adam Christodoulou became the inaugural Mini Max champion, beating Ian Beaumont and Daniel Borton while Daryl McDonald won Junior Rotax, out-pointing Turvey and David Bellchambers in a class that also included Jay Bridger, Tom Onslow-Cole.

Although grid numbers were beginning to dwindle it was clear that JICA still attracted a host of top drivers as judged by a grid that included eventual champion Sims, Bratt, Lancaster, Rowbottom, Ellis, Riki Christodoulou, Oakes and Plowman.

== BRDC stars of tomorrow ==
In 2003 two of the most significant milestones in the history of the championship occurred. Firstly the British Racing Drivers Club (BRDC) both endorsed and took a role in running the championship although Carolynn Hoy remained as Director of the Championship and retained ownership of the company. The Championship was renamed BRDC Stars of Tomorrow.

Secondly the Championship added a gearbox class to its roster for the first time, running a Junior Gearbox class that was keenly supported by Hoy, a former gearbox kart driver herself. Another off-track development was the departure of long-standing competition secretary Pat Connolly and the arrival of Marion Fell from the Cumbria Kart Club.

The ‘Stars’ calendar also expanded to eight weekends with a first trip to the South Wales circuit of Llandow and a return to Nutts Corner in Northern Ireland for the first time since 1999. Only seven weekends eventually ran with the late cancellation of the proposed final round at a purpose-built circuit at the site of the historic Brooklands circuit in Surrey.

Each class now boasted its own ‘class sponsor; usually a current British motorsports personality and/or a former series driver. The sponsors would provide an end of season prize in their class for one specially selected driver per round, usually decided by which individual gained the most places from their starting position in each race in their class during the course of each round. In 2003 the class sponsors were Jason Plato (Cadet), Lewis Hamilton (Mini Max), Dan Eaves (Junior Gearbox) and Richard Burns (Junior Max).

In addition to the Fairmont scholarship, which had been running for several years, 2003 also saw the beginning of the Will Hoy Scholarship award in memory of the late former British Touring Car Champion, who died from a brain tumour in December 2002. The winner of the scholarship would win a fully funded drive in the following year's Renault Clio Cup UK Championship. The Championship's inaugural Junior Gearbox Champion, former Fairmont Scholarship winner Daryl McDonald, was the first recipient of the Will Hoy Hard Charger Award.

McDonald's Junior Gearbox success came against a strong field of drivers including Jason Dredge, Oliver Turvey, Karl Moon and Jack Anderson.

Controversy surrounded the MSA British Cadet Champion, won provisionally by Anthony Moss although it wasn't until late in 2004 that the standings were made official. Other Cadets in 2003 included Rowland, Scott Jenkins, Jack Harvey, Stevens, Sarah Moore, Nic Cristofaro, Max Goff and Alice Powell.

Adam Christodoulou retained his Mini Max title against drivers such as Nigel Moore, Surtees and Stoneman with the class continuing to grow as karting in general began leading more and more towards Rotax and away from the more traditional classes. This was evidenced by the absence of a JICA grid and a full grid of Junior Rotax karts, which were led once again by Christodoulou who made history by becoming the first driver in series history to win two different classes in the same year.

Callum MacLeod, Sam Tordoff, Dan Rowbottom, Sean Huyton and Matthew Hamilton were among Christodoulou's main rivals although his triumphs were later tainted by revelations of engine tampering.

In 2004 the BRDC further increased their role in the championship with a new scholarship in its Silverstone Circuit based Single Seater Championship for Formula Ford cars and a non championship round at a specially designed circuit at the Silverstone Stowe circuit. The Championship also had static and live displays from Formula BMW and several drivers moved into the championship via one of the scholarship drives offered by Vic Lee Motorsport.

The Championship visited the Lydd circuit in Kent for the first (and only) time and expanded its educational and environmental roles with development of electric karts and the introduction of road shows and static displays all across the country. 2004 also saw the Championship introduce the ‘Club Stars’ concept whereby each host circuit could nominate two club drivers to contest their own round on a non-point scoring basis. Although this helped to fill grids, notably in Junior Gearbox where numbers were beginning to dwindle, the concept was dropped after just one season.

Jimmy Galloway won the MSA Cadet title despite stiff competition from Rowland, Harvey and Goff to name but a few. In Mini Max Stevens took championship honours in a class that also included Nigel Moore and Stoneman while Adam Christodoulou continued his winning ways with a successful defence of his Junior Rotax title in a class that also included Hamilton, Mueller, Daniel Rowbottom, Dean Smith and Surtees. Christodoulou was excluded from the championship in late 2004, for illegal tampering of tyres with performance enhancing additives, handing the title to Rowbottom, Christodoulou was later reinstated as champion after an appeal. Although a lot of controversy followed as Christodolou was banned from the sport for illegal engines during the 2004 series, although too much time had passed to strip the title for the second time.

Jack Linfoot won a sparsely supported Junior Gearbox Championship and with it the Will Hoy Hard Charger Award although the Will Hoy scholarship went to Jack Anderson. Richard Singleton and Craig Copeland won the BRDC Single Seater scholarships.

== Seniors join the fray ==
In its tenth anniversary season the Championship introduced a senior class for drivers over the age of 16 for the first time with the introduction of the Super ICC class. The series also held a full point scoring round at the Silverstone Stowe circuit and visited Shenington in Banbury for the first time. JICA also returned to the championship for the first time since 2002 leaving a total of six classes running under the ‘Stars’ umbrella.

Sam Jenkins, whose elder brother Scott had come close to winning the MSA title several times, took the coveted number one plate in Cadet while Devon Modell triumphed in Mini Max. Thomas Arme won the Junior Rotax class from Stefan Wilson, Daniel Lloyd, Surtees and Graham Carroll. Arme and Junior Gearbox driver Stevie Taddei won the BRDC Scholarship.

Surtees was victorious in the Junior Gearbox class from Stevie Taddei, who led into the final round but suffered major mechanical issues at the final round in every heat and final. Ben Gilliard was third from Huyton. Surtees would go down as the last champion in the history of the class as it disappeared from the UK at the end of the year.

Nigel Moore beat a small but select JICA field that also included Matt Bell, Jordan Lennox-Lamb, Alice Powell, Will Stevens, Scott Jenkins and Oliver Rowland.

The first Super ICC campaign attracted a large star-studded entry list with names such as current British Champion Frank Wrathall, multiple direct drive karting champion Michael Simpson, British Rally Champion David Higgins, British Touring Car driver and son of series founder Luke Hines and future British F3 regular Hywel Lloyd. However they were all beaten by Mark Fell, who won the Will Hoy Scholarship and a drive in the 2006 Renault Clio Cup

== 2006 ==
There were further significant changes for the 2006 season as all classes reverted to the traditional three heats and a final format and several years of timed qualifying in Junior Rotax and Gearbox. The Championship also introduced double-header rounds to some of its events to create a nine-round championship held over six weekends. A major milestone was also reached when the championship was granted permission to run one of its rounds at the Genk circuit in Belgium in what was initially a three-year deal but which has continued to the present day.

Television coverage was provided by Spellman Productions for transmission on Sky Sports with Ed Hoy, Hayley Stevens and Katie Lamb, daughter of England cricketer Alan Lamb sharing presenting duties while an agreement was reached with the Crash Media Group for inclusion in the Autocourse annual.

Behind the scenes Marion Fell left the championship and was replaced as championship co-ordinator by Debbie Sellers, who continues in that role to the present day. Less successful was the decision to try to develop an invitation class for Junior TKM and Junior TKM Intermediate, which never got off the ground. The Championship also paid its final visit to the Silverstone Stowe circuit, which was dropped for 2007 after proving unpopular with drivers.

Sam Jenkins successfully defended his MSA Cadet title against a field that included Alex Alboin, Jake Dennis, Callum Bowyer ad Sennan Fielding while Tom Ingram won the Mini Max crown at the final round of the championship at Buckmore Park, which coincided with the final appearance of the Kent venue on a Stars calendar to date.

David Sutton dominated Junior Rotax against the likes of Jack Hawksworth and Daniel Lloyd although Lloyd, along with JICA driver Jordan Lennox-Lamb won the BRDC Scholarship, which now included entry into the Junior Ginetta Championship.

Like Jenkins, Nigel Moore made a successful defence of his JICA crown against strong opposition from Stevens, Rowland, Scott Jenkins, Lennox-Lamb, Powell, Jack Harvey and Cristofaro while Stoneman won the Super ICC class.

Stoneman's main rival, Frank Wrathall, won the Will Hoy Scholarship.

== 2007 ==
2007 saw the season visit Kimbolton, Shenington, Larkhall, Llandow, Genk and Three Sisters although for the first time in series history a round had to be abandoned due to torrential rain at Shenington. The Championship continued to put on a ‘roadshow’ appearing at a local Sainsbury's Supermarket in the week preceding each one of its rounds.

Brett Wykes became the 2007 MSA British Cadet Champion ahead of Alex Albon and Hazz Truelove while Ashley Sutton dominated a strong Mini Max field that also included Matthew Parry, Jordan King and Patryk Szczerbinski, all of whom would graduate into single seater racing within a couple of years.

Having elected to hold over his BRDC Scholarship until he had completed his GCSEs Daniel Lloyd tried to succeed again in Junior Rotax but was beaten to the crown by Kenny Andrews while Sam Jenkins made it three Stars title in as many years as he narrowly defeated Max Goff in his first year in JICA. Other contenders during the year included Luke Wright, Dino Zamparelli and Sarah Moore, whose elder brother Nigel used his BRDC Scholarship to dominate the Ginetta Junior Championship.

Frank Wrathall continued in the ABkC Super 4 Super ICC Championship despite winning the Will Hoy Scholarship the previous year and starting out in a career in Ginetta's and he won the title despite missing the opening round of the year. Despite counting drivers of the calibre of Wrathall and Hawksworth numbers in the ICC class were on the wane although Wrathall did enough to win the Will Hoy scholarship for a second year running.

== 2008 ==
2008 proved to be a landmark year for the Championship and the final season under its original BRDC Stars of Tomorrow banner. The series attracted full grids in Cadet, Mini Max, Junior Max, and KF3 (formerly JICA), while KZ1 (formerly Super ICC) featured more than 20 registered drivers. With total entries exceeding 200 competitors, it marked one of the strongest and most successful seasons \ in the Championship's history

The nine round, six weekend format remained with Cadet, Mini Max and Junior Max retaining the traditional three heats and a final format with KF3 and KZ1 running timed qualifying, two heats and a final. Seven venues were used with the KZ1 class not permitted at Paul Fletcher International and instead having a stand-alone round at Three Sisters. The Championship also visited Rowrah, Whilton Mill, Llandow, Genk and Shenington during the year with supporting displays at local Sainsbury's stores in the buildup to each event.

In the MSA British Cadet Championship things were almost soured with worries over the new Tryton carbs, which proved problematic when they were introduced at the start of the year. Brett Wykes came close to defending his title but was narrowly beaten into second place by Roy Johnson, who took the first British title for emerging Cadet ‘Superteam’ Fusion Motorsport.

Callum Bowyer, who finished fifth in 2007, won the Mini Max title despite fierce competition from the likes of Matt Parry, Jody Fannin and Jordan King. There was a strong Scottish presence in Junior Max with Ross Wylie defeating compatriots Robert Gilmour, Ross Dougan.

In its first year, KF3 enjoyed an abundance of talented entries including several foreign based drivers. From a field that included defending champion Sam Jenkins, eventual BRDC Scholarship winner Carl Stirling, Colombian Oscar Tunjo, Alex Albon and Mitchell Hale, Racing Steps Foundation backed driver Jake Dennis eventually took the title in his first year out of Cadet in a dramatic final round.

Although the KZ1 grid started off strongly it tailed off dramatically at the end of the year and would disappear from the FKS roster over the winter. Tom Duggan emerged as the eventual champion and became the final winner of the Will Hoy Scholarship award, which he used to help him into a brief stint in Formula Palmer Audi.

2008 also saw the start of the first Stars ‘exchange’ meeting with several front running Cadets in the North American Snap On Stars of Karting Championship participating in the final two rounds of the season at Shenington with Johnson, Charlie Robertson and James Armitage.

== 2009 and change to Formula Kart Stars ==
In February 2009 the championship reached an agreement with Bernie Ecclestone's Formula One Management (FOM) company, Lewis Hamilton and his father Anthony to rebrand the championship as Formula Kart Stars, moving away from the BRDC. The agreement was unique in that it was the first time that Formula One was directly linked to any karting championship in the world despite the fact that the vast majority of F1 drivers over the previous 25-years started out in karting

In addition to the new title and format a multitude of changes swept through the championship in 2009 with parc-ferme fuel and tyres all being used. With the new system taking a while to gel and many drivers unhappy with the new format, which on double header weekends differed from Saturday to Sunday. A lack of track time was cited as one of the main causes for concern, especially in Mini Max, Junior Max and KF3, which ran an entirely different format to the MSA Cadet Championship in some rounds and then ran a similar qualifying/pre-final/final format in other meetings.

Kimbolton, Glan Y Gors, Rowrah, PFI, Genk and Whilton Mill were all visited during the year with FKS making its debut at the scenic GYG track in North Wales

With no KZ1 grid the championship attempted to introduce a class for KF2 as a way of keeping senior drivers in the series but the class was not a success and was dropped after just one, poorly attended round.

The MSA Cadet Championship went down to the wire with George Russell narrowly beating Harry Webb and Alex Gill while Mini Max also went down to the final race of the year with Jack Barlow edging out Harry Crawley and James Singleton. Matt Parry dominated the Junior Rotax class. while Alex Albon displayed a similar class in KF3 as he won the title.

The FKS exchange programme also continued for a second year with Russell, Gill, Sennan Fielding and Ricky Collard competing in a round of the North American Cadet Championship in Indiana and several drivers coming across to the UK for the PFI round of the championship. One of the exchange drivers, New Englander Santino Ferrucci, remained with the championship for the remainder of the year and continued to participate in 2010.

Although the BRDC and Will Hoy scholarships had come to an end Bernie Ecclestone brought his backing to the new ‘Bernie Ecclestone Driver of the Day’ award that saw the nine 2009 winners attend the 2010 Italian Grand Prix as VIP guests. Further prizes were announced with Formula Palmer Audi and the new Autosport Young Guns Championship, which took place in early 2010.

== 2010 season ==
The second season under the FKS banner was a great improvement on the first with six doubleheader weekends making the twelve round championship the longest in series history. The format of timed qualifying, two heats and a final for each class also proved popular as did the switch in race distances from a set number of laps to a set number of minutes. Parc ferme tyres remained but parc ferme fuel was scrapped with new control fuel suppliers One Fuel Ltd by Shell coming on board and proving to be popular with competitors.

While the MSA Cadet Championship kept a maximum grid size of 56, the change in format meant that Mini Max, Junior Max and KF3 could only accept a maximum of 30 karts and following the disappointment of the 2009 season the KF3 grid did not reach capacity.

The Championship visited Rowrah, Whilton Mill, Glan Y Gors, Genk, Three Sisters and, for the first time, Ellough Park in Suffolk. Behind the scenes there were changes too with the departure of chief clerk of the course Nigel Edwards and the arrival of the vastly experienced John Felix from the world of car racing and veteran gearbox karting clerk Terry Bateman.

The MSA Cadet Championship was the closest in series history with Nathan Aston and Connor Jupp finishing the year tied on points and the championship having to use dropped scores to separate them, which gave the title to Aston. George Russell won the Mini Max title at his first attempt while Ash Hand out-pointed 2009 Mini Max Champion Jack Barlow to claim the Junior Max title with eight overall wins. Ben Barnicoat beat Matthew Graham and Charlie Robertson to claim the KF3 crown.

== 2011 season ==
In 2011 Formula Kart Stars ran the MSA British Cadet Championship for Cadet Comer as well as the FKS Mini Max, Junior Rotax and KF3 Championships. The format remained the same as 2010 with six doubleheader weekends at Rowrah, Three Sisters, Glan Y Gors, Genk, Whilton Mill and Ellough Park.

One Fuel by Shell Racing Solutions continued as the official fuel supplier while Powerboat P1, iZone Driver Performance, TAG Heuer, KEP Print Group, Ginetta, The Race Drivers Academy, Sports Timing Services and JC Motorhomes offered either prizes or logistical support.

Martin Plowman (Cadet), Lewis Hamilton (Mini Max), Bradley Ellis (Junior Max) and Luke Hines (KF3) continued as class sponsors, offering an end of season prize to the driver in their respective class who gains the most positions during the course of each round. Bernie Ecclestone will once again sponsor the Driver of the Day prize.

As was the case in 2011 the MSA British Cadet Championship went down to the final round as Daniel Ticktum snatched the crown by eleven points for Jamie Caroline. Ticktum became the third Fusion Motorsport driver in four years to claim the British title after four victories.

Josh White won the Mini Max title thanks to double victories at Three Sisters and Whilton Mill while James Singleton wrapped up the Junior Rotax title with two rounds to spare after seven wins. The KF3 Championship ran as a single weekend championship at Whilton Mill, the weekend following the death of Championship co-founder Martin Hines and saw Callum Ilott scoop his first major title over Matthew Graham and Hines’ latest protégé Ben Barnicoat.

== 2012 season ==
In 2012 Formula Kart Stars saw two new classes enter the championship in the form of Cadet Honda and Senior Rotax and the absence of KF3, the first time since 2004 that KF3, or its predecessor JICA hadn't been represented in the Championship. The Championship began at Kimbolton and also visited Ellough Park, Larkhall in Scotland, Glan Y Gors in Wales, Nutts Corner in Northern Ireland before concluding at Whilton Mill and while the regular FKS classes will follow the same championship format as 2011, Cadet Honda and Senior Rotax ran as a series of 12 individual Challenge events at the behest of the MSA.

== Previous Champions ==
Year	Class	Champion
1996	MSA British Cadet Championship	Lewis Hamilton
1997	MSA British Cadet Championship	Paul di Resta
1998	MSA British Cadet Championship	Adam King
1999	MSA British Cadet Championship	Bradley Ellis
2000	MSA British Cadet Championship	Jeremy Metcalfe
2001	MSA British Cadet Championship	James Calado
2002	MSA British Cadet Championship	James Bradshaw
2003	MSA British Cadet Championship	Anthony Moss
2004	MSA British Cadet Championship	Jimmy Galloway
2005	MSA British Cadet Championship	Sam Jenkins
2006	MSA British Cadet Championship	Sam Jenkins
2007	MSA British Cadet Championship	Brett Wykes
2008	MSA British Cadet Championship	Roy Johnson
2009	MSA British Cadet Championship	George Russell
2010	MSA British Cadet Championship	Nathan Aston
2011	MSA British Cadet Championship	Dan Ticktum

Year	Class	Champion
1996	Formula Yamaha	Andrew Delahunty
1997	Formula Yamaha	Lewis Hamilton
1998	Formula Yamaha	Adrian Estasy
1999	Formula Yamaha	Ian Johnstone
2000	Formula Yamaha	Bradley Ellis
2001	Formula Yamaha	Jack Anderson

Year	Class	Champion
2002	Mini Max	Adam Christodoulou
2003	Mini Max	Adam Christodoulou
2004	Mini Max	Will Stevens
2005	Mini Max	Devon Modell
2006	Mini Max	Tom Ingram
2007	Mini Max	Ashley Sutton
2008	Mini Max	Callum Bowyer
2009	Mini Max	Jack Barlow
2010	Mini Max	George Russell
2011	Mini Max	Josh White

Year	Class	Champion
2000	Junior Rotax	Nicky Mitchell
2001	Junior Rotax	Darren Burke
2002	Junior Rotax	Daryl Macdonald
2003	Junior Rotax	Adam Christodoulou
2004	Junior Rotax	Adam Christodoulou
2005	Junior Rotax	Thomas Arme
2006	Junior Rotax	David Sutton
2007	Junior Rotax	Kenny Andrews
2008	Junior Rotax	Ross Wylie
2009	Junior Rotax	Matt Parry
2010	Junior Rotax	Ash Hand
2011	Junior Rotax	James Singleton

Year	Class	Champion
2003	Junior Gearbox	Daryl Macdonald
2004	Junior Gearbox	Jack Linfoot
2005	Junior Gearbox	Henry Surtees
2006	Junior Gearbox	Sean Huyton

Year	Class	Champion
2005	Super ICC	Mark Fell
2006	Super ICC	Dean Stoneman
2007	Super ICC	Frank Wrathall
2008	Super ICC	Frank Wrathall
2009	Super ICC	Tom Duggan

Year	Class	Champion
1996	JICA	Gary Paffett
1997	JICA	Stefan Hodgetts
1998	JICA	Fraser Sheader
1999	JICA	Russell Parkes
2000	JICA	Paul di Resta
2001	JICA	Paul di Resta
2002	JICA	Alexander Sims
2003	JICA	No Championship
2004	JICA	No Championship
2005	JICA	Nigel Moore
2006	JICA	Nigel Moore
2007	JICA	Sam Jenkins

Year	Class	Champion
2008	KF3	Jake Dennis
2009	KF3	Alex Albon
2010	KF3	Ben Barnicoat
2011	KF3	Callum Ilott
