= 2023 Dubai 24 Hour =

The layout of the Dubai Autodrome.

The 2023 Hankook Dubai 24 Hour was the 18th running of the Dubai 24 Hour, an endurance race that took place at the Dubai Autodrome on 14 and 15 January 2023. It was also the first round of the 2023 24H GT Series and TCE Series.

== Schedule ==
Date	Time (local: GST)	Event	Distance
Friday 13 January	9:20–11:20	Free practice	120 mins
Friday 13 January	14:00–14:35	Qualifying sessions – classes TC, TCX, TCR & GT4	2 × 15 mins
Friday 13 January	14:45–15:20	Qualifying sessions – classes GT3, GTX, 992	2 × 15 mins
Friday 13 January	18:00–19:00	Night practice – All cars	60 mins
Friday 13 January	19:10–19:45	Night-qualifying sessions – Classes TC, TCX, TCR & GT4	2 × 15 mins
Friday 13 January	19:55–20:30	Night-qualifying sessions – Classes GT3, GTX, 992	2 × 15 mins
Saturday, 14 January	15:00	Race	24 hours
Sunday, 15 January	15:00	Race	24 hours

== Entry list ==
53 cars are entered into the event: 47 GT cars and 6 TCEs.

Team	Car	Engine	No.	Drivers	Class
GT3 (21 entries)
(Germany) Phoenix Racing	Audi R8 LMS Evo II	Audi 5.2 L V10	1	(Austria) Michael Doppelmayr	PA
(Germany) Phoenix Racing	Audi R8 LMS Evo II	Audi 5.2 L V10	1	(Germany) Pierre Kaffer	PA
(Germany) Phoenix Racing	Audi R8 LMS Evo II	Audi 5.2 L V10	1	(Germany) Elia Erhart	PA
(Germany) Phoenix Racing	Audi R8 LMS Evo II	Audi 5.2 L V10	1	(Germany) Christer Jöns	PA
(France) Visiom	Ferrari 488 GT3 Evo 2020	Ferrari 3.9 L Twin-Turbo V8	2	(France) Jean-Bernard Bouvet	PA
(France) Visiom	Ferrari 488 GT3 Evo 2020	Ferrari 3.9 L Twin-Turbo V8	2	(France) Romain Iannetta	PA
(France) Visiom	Ferrari 488 GT3 Evo 2020	Ferrari 3.9 L Twin-Turbo V8	2	(France) Jean-Paul Pagny	PA
(France) Visiom	Ferrari 488 GT3 Evo 2020	Ferrari 3.9 L Twin-Turbo V8	2	(France) Christophe Tinseau	PA
(United Arab Emirates) Abu Dhabi Racing by HRT Bilstein	Mercedes-AMG GT3 Evo	Mercedes-AMG M159 6.2 L V8	4	(United Arab Emirates) Khaled Al Qubaisi	P
(United Arab Emirates) Abu Dhabi Racing by HRT Bilstein	Mercedes-AMG GT3 Evo	Mercedes-AMG M159 6.2 L V8	4	(France) Sébastien Baud	P
(United Arab Emirates) Abu Dhabi Racing by HRT Bilstein	Mercedes-AMG GT3 Evo	Mercedes-AMG M159 6.2 L V8	4	(Andorra) Jules Gounon (Note: Jules Gounon is a French racing driver competing with an Andorran racing license.)	P
(United Arab Emirates) Abu Dhabi Racing by HRT Bilstein	Mercedes-AMG GT3 Evo	Mercedes-AMG M159 6.2 L V8	4	(Germany) Hubert Haupt	P
(Oman) Al Manar Racing by HRT	Mercedes-AMG GT3 Evo	Mercedes-AMG M159 6.2 L V8	777	(Oman) Al Faisal Al Zubair	P
(Oman) Al Manar Racing by HRT	Mercedes-AMG GT3 Evo	Mercedes-AMG M159 6.2 L V8	777	(Zimbabwe) Axcil Jefferies	P
(Oman) Al Manar Racing by HRT	Mercedes-AMG GT3 Evo	Mercedes-AMG M159 6.2 L V8	777	(Austria) Martin Konrad	P
(Oman) Al Manar Racing by HRT	Mercedes-AMG GT3 Evo	Mercedes-AMG M159 6.2 L V8	777	(Germany) Fabian Schiller	P
(Oman) Al Manar Racing by HRT	Mercedes-AMG GT3 Evo	Mercedes-AMG M159 6.2 L V8	777	(Germany) Luca Stolz	P
(Saudi Arabia) MS7 by BMW M Team WRT	BMW M4 GT3	BMW S58B30T0 3.0 L Turbo I6	7	(Saudi Arabia) Mohammed Bin Saud Al Saud	P
(Saudi Arabia) MS7 by BMW M Team WRT	BMW M4 GT3	BMW S58B30T0 3.0 L Turbo I6	7	(Mexico) Diego Menchaca	P
(Saudi Arabia) MS7 by BMW M Team WRT	BMW M4 GT3	BMW S58B30T0 3.0 L Turbo I6	7	(France) Jean-Baptiste Simmenauer	P
(Saudi Arabia) MS7 by BMW M Team WRT	BMW M4 GT3	BMW S58B30T0 3.0 L Turbo I6	7	(Belgium) Dries Vanthoor	P
(Saudi Arabia) MS7 by BMW M Team WRT	BMW M4 GT3	BMW S58B30T0 3.0 L Turbo I6	7	(Germany) Jens Klingmann	P
(Italy) KFC VR46 by BMW M Team WRT	BMW M4 GT3	BMW S58B30T0 3.0 L Turbo I6	46	(Indonesia) Sean Gelael	P
(Italy) KFC VR46 by BMW M Team WRT	BMW M4 GT3	BMW S58B30T0 3.0 L Turbo I6	46	(Belgium) Maxime Martin	P
(Italy) KFC VR46 by BMW M Team WRT	BMW M4 GT3	BMW S58B30T0 3.0 L Turbo I6	46	(Italy) Valentino Rossi	P
(Italy) KFC VR46 by BMW M Team WRT	BMW M4 GT3	BMW S58B30T0 3.0 L Turbo I6	46	(United Kingdom) Tim Whale	P
(Italy) KFC VR46 by BMW M Team WRT	BMW M4 GT3	BMW S58B30T0 3.0 L Turbo I6	46	(Germany) Max Hesse	P
(Australia) Grove Racing	Porsche 911 GT3 R	Porsche 4.0 L Flat-6	10	(New Zealand) Earl Bamber	P
(Australia) Grove Racing	Porsche 911 GT3 R	Porsche 4.0 L Flat-6	10	(Australia) Brenton Grove	P
(Australia) Grove Racing	Porsche 911 GT3 R	Porsche 4.0 L Flat-6	10	(Australia) Stephen Grove	P
(Australia) Grove Racing	Porsche 911 GT3 R	Porsche 4.0 L Flat-6	10	(Australia) Anton de Pasquale	P
(Denmark) Poulsen Motorsport	BMW M4 GT3	BMW S58B30T0 3.0 L Turbo I6	14	(Denmark) Gustav Birch	PA
(Denmark) Poulsen Motorsport	BMW M4 GT3	BMW S58B30T0 3.0 L Turbo I6	14	(Denmark) Kasper H. Jensen	PA
(Denmark) Poulsen Motorsport	BMW M4 GT3	BMW S58B30T0 3.0 L Turbo I6	14	(Denmark) Kristian Poulsen	PA
(Denmark) Poulsen Motorsport	BMW M4 GT3	BMW S58B30T0 3.0 L Turbo I6	14	(Denmark) Roland Poulsen	PA
(Netherlands) MP Motorsport	Mercedes-AMG GT3 Evo	Mercedes-AMG M159 6.2 L V8	19	(Netherlands) Bert de Heus	PA
(Netherlands) MP Motorsport	Mercedes-AMG GT3 Evo	Mercedes-AMG M159 6.2 L V8	19	(Netherlands) Daniël de Jong	PA
(Netherlands) MP Motorsport	Mercedes-AMG GT3 Evo	Mercedes-AMG M159 6.2 L V8	19	(Netherlands) Henk de Jong	PA
(Netherlands) MP Motorsport	Mercedes-AMG GT3 Evo	Mercedes-AMG M159 6.2 L V8	19	(Netherlands) Jaap van Lagen	PA
(Antigua and Barbuda) HAAS RT	Audi R8 LMS Evo II	Audi 5.2 L V10	21	(Belgium) Olivier Bertels	P
(Antigua and Barbuda) HAAS RT	Audi R8 LMS Evo II	Audi 5.2 L V10	21	(Belgium) Mathieu Detry	P
(Antigua and Barbuda) HAAS RT	Audi R8 LMS Evo II	Audi 5.2 L V10	21	(Germany) Benjamin Mazatis	P
(Antigua and Barbuda) HAAS RT	Audi R8 LMS Evo II	Audi 5.2 L V10	21	(Belgium) Maxime Soulet	P
(Antigua and Barbuda) HAAS RT	Audi R8 LMS Evo II	Audi 5.2 L V10	21	(Belgium) Frédéric Vervisch	P
(France) Saintéloc Junior Team	Audi R8 LMS Evo II	Audi 5.2 L V10	26	(France) Simon Gachet	P
(France) Saintéloc Junior Team	Audi R8 LMS Evo II	Audi 5.2 L V10	26	(Luxembourg) Christian Kelders	P
(France) Saintéloc Junior Team	Audi R8 LMS Evo II	Audi 5.2 L V10	26	(France) Erwan Bastard	P
(France) Saintéloc Junior Team	Audi R8 LMS Evo II	Audi 5.2 L V10	26	(France) Antoine Doquin	P
(France) Saintéloc Junior Team	Audi R8 LMS Evo II	Audi 5.2 L V10	26	(France) Gregoire Demoustier	P
(United States) Heart of Racing by SPS	Mercedes-AMG GT3 Evo	Mercedes-AMG M159 6.2 L V8	27	(Canada) Roman De Angelis	PA
(United States) Heart of Racing by SPS	Mercedes-AMG GT3 Evo	Mercedes-AMG M159 6.2 L V8	27	(United Kingdom) Ian James	PA
(United States) Heart of Racing by SPS	Mercedes-AMG GT3 Evo	Mercedes-AMG M159 6.2 L V8	27	(United States) Gray Newell	PA
(United States) Heart of Racing by SPS	Mercedes-AMG GT3 Evo	Mercedes-AMG M159 6.2 L V8	27	(United Kingdom) Ross Gunn	PA
(Netherlands) Team GP-Elite	Porsche 911 GT3 R	Porsche 4.0 L Flat-6	32	(Netherlands) Lucas Groeneveld	P
(Netherlands) Team GP-Elite	Porsche 911 GT3 R	Porsche 4.0 L Flat-6	32	(Netherlands) Daan van Kuijk	P
(Netherlands) Team GP-Elite	Porsche 911 GT3 R	Porsche 4.0 L Flat-6	32	(Netherlands) Jesse van Kuijk	P
(Netherlands) Team GP-Elite	Porsche 911 GT3 R	Porsche 4.0 L Flat-6	32	(Netherlands) Max van Splunteren	P
(Germany) P1 Groupe by MRS GT Racing	Porsche 911 GT3 R	Porsche 4.0 L Flat-6	43	(Finland) Jukka Honkavuori	PA
(Germany) P1 Groupe by MRS GT Racing	Porsche 911 GT3 R	Porsche 4.0 L Flat-6	43	(Germany) Leon Köhler	PA
(Germany) P1 Groupe by MRS GT Racing	Porsche 911 GT3 R	Porsche 4.0 L Flat-6	43	(United Kingdom) Alex Sedgwick	PA
(Germany) P1 Groupe by MRS GT Racing	Porsche 911 GT3 R	Porsche 4.0 L Flat-6	43	(United States) Alex Vogel	PA
(United Arab Emirates) S’Aalocin by Kox Racing	Porsche 911 GT3 R	Porsche 4.0 L Flat-6	48	(Netherlands) Peter Kox	P
(United Arab Emirates) S’Aalocin by Kox Racing	Porsche 911 GT3 R	Porsche 4.0 L Flat-6	48	(Netherlands) Stéphane Kox	P
(United Arab Emirates) S’Aalocin by Kox Racing	Porsche 911 GT3 R	Porsche 4.0 L Flat-6	48	(Netherlands) Nico Pronk	P
(United Arab Emirates) S’Aalocin by Kox Racing	Porsche 911 GT3 R	Porsche 4.0 L Flat-6	48	(Netherlands) Dennis Retera	P
(United Arab Emirates) S’Aalocin by Kox Racing	Porsche 911 GT3 R	Porsche 4.0 L Flat-6	48	(Belgium) Tom Boonen	P
(United Kingdom) 7TSIX	McLaren 720S GT3	McLaren M840T 4.0 L Turbo V8	76	(United Kingdom) James Cottingham	Am
(United Kingdom) 7TSIX	McLaren 720S GT3	McLaren M840T 4.0 L Turbo V8	76	(United Kingdom) Andrew Gilbert-Scott	Am
(United Kingdom) 7TSIX	McLaren 720S GT3	McLaren M840T 4.0 L Turbo V8	76	(Spain) Fran Rueda	Am
(United Kingdom) 7TSIX	McLaren 720S GT3	McLaren M840T 4.0 L Turbo V8	76	(Slovakia) Matúš Výboh	Am
(United States) CP Racing	Mercedes-AMG GT3 Evo	Mercedes-AMG M159 6.2 L V8	85	(United States) Charles Espenlaub	Am
(United States) CP Racing	Mercedes-AMG GT3 Evo	Mercedes-AMG M159 6.2 L V8	85	(United States) Joe Foster	Am
(United States) CP Racing	Mercedes-AMG GT3 Evo	Mercedes-AMG M159 6.2 L V8	85	(United States) Shane Lewis	Am
(United States) CP Racing	Mercedes-AMG GT3 Evo	Mercedes-AMG M159 6.2 L V8	85	(United States) Charles Putman	Am
(United States) CP Racing	Mercedes-AMG GT3 Evo	Mercedes-AMG M159 6.2 L V8	85	(United Kingdom) Phil Quaife	Am
(Germany) Herberth Motorsport	Porsche 911 GT3 R	Porsche 4.0 L Flat-6	91	(Switzerland) Daniel Allemann	PA
(Germany) Herberth Motorsport	Porsche 911 GT3 R	Porsche 4.0 L Flat-6	91	(Germany) Ralf Bohn	PA
(Germany) Herberth Motorsport	Porsche 911 GT3 R	Porsche 4.0 L Flat-6	91	(Germany) Alfred Renauer	PA
(Germany) Herberth Motorsport	Porsche 911 GT3 R	Porsche 4.0 L Flat-6	91	(Germany) Robert Renauer	PA
(Germany) Herberth Motorsport	Porsche 911 GT3 R	Porsche 4.0 L Flat-6	92	(United States) Adam Adelson	PA
(Germany) Herberth Motorsport	Porsche 911 GT3 R	Porsche 4.0 L Flat-6	92	(United States) Jason Hart	PA
(Germany) Herberth Motorsport	Porsche 911 GT3 R	Porsche 4.0 L Flat-6	92	(United States) Seth Lucas	PA
(Germany) Herberth Motorsport	Porsche 911 GT3 R	Porsche 4.0 L Flat-6	92	(United States) Elliot Skeer	PA
(Germany) Attempto Racing	Audi R8 LMS Evo	Audi 5.2 L V10	99	(Germany) Alex Aka	P
(Germany) Attempto Racing	Audi R8 LMS Evo	Audi 5.2 L V10	99	(United Kingdom) Finlay Hutchison	P
(Germany) Attempto Racing	Audi R8 LMS Evo	Audi 5.2 L V10	99	Andrey Mukovoz (Note: Andrey Mukovoz is a Russian driver competing under the Neutral flag due to the FIA ban of the use of the Russian flag due to the Russian invasion of Ukraine.)	P
(Germany) Attempto Racing	Audi R8 LMS Evo	Audi 5.2 L V10	99	(Luxembourg) Dylan Pereira	P
(Lithuania) Pure Rxcing	Porsche 911 GT3 R	Porsche 4.0 L Flat-6	911	(United Kingdom) Harry King	P
(Lithuania) Pure Rxcing	Porsche 911 GT3 R	Porsche 4.0 L Flat-6	911	(United Kingdom) Alex Malykhin (Note: Alex Malykhin is a Belarusian driver competing with a British license due to the FIA ban of the use of the Belarusian flag due to the Russian invasion of Ukraine.)	P
(Lithuania) Pure Rxcing	Porsche 911 GT3 R	Porsche 4.0 L Flat-6	911	(Germany) Sven Müller	P
(Lithuania) Pure Rxcing	Porsche 911 GT3 R	Porsche 4.0 L Flat-6	911	(Germany) Joel Sturm	P
GTX (3 entries)
(France) Vortex V8	Vortex 1.0 GTX	Chevrolet 6.2 L V8	701	(France) Lionel Amrouche	
(France) Vortex V8	Vortex 1.0 GTX	Chevrolet 6.2 L V8	701	(France) Philippe Bonnel	
(France) Vortex V8	Vortex 1.0 GTX	Chevrolet 6.2 L V8	701	(France) Philippe Gruau	
(France) Vortex V8	Vortex 1.0 GTX	Chevrolet 6.2 L V8	701	(France) Tom Pieri	
(France) Vortex V8	Vortex 1.0 GTX	Chevrolet 6.2 L V8	702	(France) Philippe Fertoret	
(France) Vortex V8	Vortex 1.0 GTX	Chevrolet 6.2 L V8	702	(France) Miguel Moiola	
(France) Vortex V8	Vortex 1.0 GTX	Chevrolet 6.2 L V8	702	(Switzerland) Nicolas Nobs	
(France) Vortex V8	Vortex 1.0 GTX	Chevrolet 6.2 L V8	702	(France) Lucas Sugliano	
(Austria) razoon-more than racing	KTM X-Bow GT2 Concept	Audi 2.5 L I5	714	(Austria) Bob Bau	
(Austria) razoon-more than racing	KTM X-Bow GT2 Concept	Audi 2.5 L I5	714	(Austria) Daniel Drexel	
(Austria) razoon-more than racing	KTM X-Bow GT2 Concept	Audi 2.5 L I5	714	(Austria) Ernst Kirchmayr	
(Austria) razoon-more than racing	KTM X-Bow GT2 Concept	Audi 2.5 L I5	714	(Austria) Leo Pichler	
(Austria) razoon-more than racing	KTM X-Bow GT2 Concept	Audi 2.5 L I5	714	(Austria) Kris Rosenberger	
992 (18 entries)
(Luxembourg) SebLajoux Racing by DUWO Racing	Porsche 992 GT3 Cup	Porsche 4.0 L Flat-6	907	(France) Alexandre de Bernardinis	Am
(Luxembourg) SebLajoux Racing by DUWO Racing	Porsche 992 GT3 Cup	Porsche 4.0 L Flat-6	907	(Switzerland) Gislain Genecand	Am
(Luxembourg) SebLajoux Racing by DUWO Racing	Porsche 992 GT3 Cup	Porsche 4.0 L Flat-6	907	(France) Xavier Michel	Am
(Luxembourg) SebLajoux Racing by DUWO Racing	Porsche 992 GT3 Cup	Porsche 4.0 L Flat-6	907	(France) Gabriel Pemeant	Am
(Luxembourg) SebLajoux Racing by DUWO Racing	Porsche 992 GT3 Cup	Porsche 4.0 L Flat-6	908	(France) Jean-Christophe David	Am
(Luxembourg) SebLajoux Racing by DUWO Racing	Porsche 992 GT3 Cup	Porsche 4.0 L Flat-6	908	(France) Mathys Jaubert	Am
(Luxembourg) SebLajoux Racing by DUWO Racing	Porsche 992 GT3 Cup	Porsche 4.0 L Flat-6	908	(France) Sebastien Lajoux	Am
(Luxembourg) SebLajoux Racing by DUWO Racing	Porsche 992 GT3 Cup	Porsche 4.0 L Flat-6	908	(France) Lionel Rigaud	Am
(Netherlands) Red Camel-Jordans.nl	Porsche 992 GT3 Cup	Porsche 4.0 L Flat-6	909	(Netherlands) Ivo Breukers	P
(Netherlands) Red Camel-Jordans.nl	Porsche 992 GT3 Cup	Porsche 4.0 L Flat-6	909	(Netherlands) Luc Breukers	P
(Netherlands) Red Camel-Jordans.nl	Porsche 992 GT3 Cup	Porsche 4.0 L Flat-6	909	(Netherlands) Rik Breukers	P
(Netherlands) Red Camel-Jordans.nl	Porsche 992 GT3 Cup	Porsche 4.0 L Flat-6	909	(Switzerland) Fabian Danz	P
(Germany) Huber Racing	Porsche 992 GT3 Cup	Porsche 4.0 L Flat-6	925	(Germany) Stefan Aust	Am
(Germany) Huber Racing	Porsche 992 GT3 Cup	Porsche 4.0 L Flat-6	925	(Germany) Steffen Görig	Am
(Germany) Huber Racing	Porsche 992 GT3 Cup	Porsche 4.0 L Flat-6	925	(Germany) Klaus Rader	Am
(Germany) Huber Racing	Porsche 992 GT3 Cup	Porsche 4.0 L Flat-6	925	(Germany) Hans Wehrmann	Am
(Germany) NKPP by HRT Performance	Porsche 992 GT3 Cup	Porsche 4.0 L Flat-6	928	(Netherlands) Mark van der Aa	Am
(Germany) NKPP by HRT Performance	Porsche 992 GT3 Cup	Porsche 4.0 L Flat-6	928	(Netherlands) Gijs Bessem	Am
(Germany) NKPP by HRT Performance	Porsche 992 GT3 Cup	Porsche 4.0 L Flat-6	928	(Netherlands) Bob Herber	Am
(Germany) NKPP by HRT Performance	Porsche 992 GT3 Cup	Porsche 4.0 L Flat-6	928	(Netherlands) Harry Hilders	Am
QMMF by HRT Thuraya Qatar	Porsche 992 GT3 Cup	Porsche 4.0 L Flat-6	929	(Qatar) Ghanim Ali Al-Maadheed	Am
QMMF by HRT Thuraya Qatar	Porsche 992 GT3 Cup	Porsche 4.0 L Flat-6	929	(Qatar) Abdulla Ali Al-Khelaifi	Am
QMMF by HRT Thuraya Qatar	Porsche 992 GT3 Cup	Porsche 4.0 L Flat-6	929	(Qatar) Ibrahim Al-Abdulghani	Am
QMMF by HRT Thuraya Qatar	Porsche 992 GT3 Cup	Porsche 4.0 L Flat-6	930	(Qatar) Abdullah Al Abbasi	Am
QMMF by HRT Thuraya Qatar	Porsche 992 GT3 Cup	Porsche 4.0 L Flat-6	930	(Qatar) Abdulaziz Al Jabri	Am
QMMF by HRT Thuraya Qatar	Porsche 992 GT3 Cup	Porsche 4.0 L Flat-6	930	(Qatar) Ibrahim Al-Mannai	Am
(Germany) HRT Performance	Porsche 992 GT3 Cup	Porsche 4.0 L Flat-6	931	(Germany) Holger Harmsen	Am
(Germany) HRT Performance	Porsche 992 GT3 Cup	Porsche 4.0 L Flat-6	931	(Germany) Fidel Leib	Am
(Germany) HRT Performance	Porsche 992 GT3 Cup	Porsche 4.0 L Flat-6	931	(South Africa) Mikaeel Pitamber	Am
(Germany) HRT Performance	Porsche 992 GT3 Cup	Porsche 4.0 L Flat-6	932	(France) Stéphane Adler	Am
(Germany) HRT Performance	Porsche 992 GT3 Cup	Porsche 4.0 L Flat-6	932	(France) Michael Blanchemain	Am
(Germany) HRT Performance	Porsche 992 GT3 Cup	Porsche 4.0 L Flat-6	932	(France) Jérôme Da Costa	Am
(Germany) HRT Performance	Porsche 992 GT3 Cup	Porsche 4.0 L Flat-6	932	(France) Franck Leherpeur	Am
(Germany) MRS GT-Racing	Porsche 992 GT3 Cup	Porsche 4.0 L Flat-6	988	(Lithuania) Sigitas Ambrazevicius	Am
(Germany) MRS GT-Racing	Porsche 992 GT3 Cup	Porsche 4.0 L Flat-6	988	(Lithuania) Arunas Geciauskas	Am
(Germany) MRS GT-Racing	Porsche 992 GT3 Cup	Porsche 4.0 L Flat-6	988	(Estonia) Antti Rammo	Am
(Germany) MRS GT-Racing	Porsche 992 GT3 Cup	Porsche 4.0 L Flat-6	989	(Kazakhstan) Alexandr Artemyev (Note: Alexandr Artemtyev is a Russian driver competing with a Kazakhstani License due to the FIA ban of the use of the Russian flag due to the Russian invasion of Ukraine.)	P
(Germany) MRS GT-Racing	Porsche 992 GT3 Cup	Porsche 4.0 L Flat-6	989	(Belgium) Rodrigue Gillion	P
(Germany) MRS GT-Racing	Porsche 992 GT3 Cup	Porsche 4.0 L Flat-6	989	(Kyrgyzstan) Andrey Solukovtsev (Note: Andrey Solukovtsev is a Russian driver competing with a Kyrgyzstani license due to the FIA ban of the use of the Russian flag due to the Russian invasion of Ukraine.)	P
(Germany) MRS GT-Racing	Porsche 992 GT3 Cup	Porsche 4.0 L Flat-6	989	(Mexico) Rafael Vallina	P
(Germany) MRS GT-Racing	Porsche 992 GT3 Cup	Porsche 4.0 L Flat-6	989	(Belgium) Nico Verdonck	P
(Germany) MRS GT-Racing	Porsche 992 GT3 Cup	Porsche 4.0 L Flat-6	990	(Germany) Andreas Gülden	Am
(Germany) MRS GT-Racing	Porsche 992 GT3 Cup	Porsche 4.0 L Flat-6	990	(Germany) Marc Hennerici	Am
(Germany) MRS GT-Racing	Porsche 992 GT3 Cup	Porsche 4.0 L Flat-6	990	(Germany) Alex Herbst	Am
(Germany) MRS GT-Racing	Porsche 992 GT3 Cup	Porsche 4.0 L Flat-6	990	(United States) Peter Pejacsevich	Am
(Romania) Willi Motorsport by Ebimotors	Porsche 992 GT3 Cup	Porsche 4.0 L Flat-6	955	(Italy) Fabrizio Broggi	P
(Romania) Willi Motorsport by Ebimotors	Porsche 992 GT3 Cup	Porsche 4.0 L Flat-6	955	(Italy) Sabino de Castro	P
(Romania) Willi Motorsport by Ebimotors	Porsche 992 GT3 Cup	Porsche 4.0 L Flat-6	955	(Romania) Sergiu Nicolae	P
(Switzerland) Fach Auto Tech	Porsche 992 GT3 Cup	Porsche 4.0 L Flat-6	961	(Switzerland) Alexander Fach	P
(Switzerland) Fach Auto Tech	Porsche 992 GT3 Cup	Porsche 4.0 L Flat-6	961	(Switzerland) Peter Hegglin	P
(Switzerland) Fach Auto Tech	Porsche 992 GT3 Cup	Porsche 4.0 L Flat-6	961	(Switzerland) Jan Klingelnberg	P
(Switzerland) Fach Auto Tech	Porsche 992 GT3 Cup	Porsche 4.0 L Flat-6	961	(Germany) Christof Langer	P
(Switzerland) Fach Auto Tech	Porsche 992 GT3 Cup	Porsche 4.0 L Flat-6	961	(Austria) Christopher Zöchling	P
(Switzerland) Fach Auto Tech	Porsche 992 GT3 Cup	Porsche 4.0 L Flat-6	962	(Netherlands) Huub van Eijndhoven	P
(Switzerland) Fach Auto Tech	Porsche 992 GT3 Cup	Porsche 4.0 L Flat-6	962	(Germany) Matthias Hoffsümmer	P
(Switzerland) Fach Auto Tech	Porsche 992 GT3 Cup	Porsche 4.0 L Flat-6	962	(Luxembourg) Gabriele Rindone	P
(Switzerland) Fach Auto Tech	Porsche 992 GT3 Cup	Porsche 4.0 L Flat-6	962	(Germany) Alexander Schwarzer	P
(Switzerland) Fach Auto Tech	Porsche 992 GT3 Cup	Porsche 4.0 L Flat-6	962	(Netherlands) Larry ten Voorde	P
(United Arab Emirates) RABDAN Motorsports	Porsche 992 GT3 Cup	Porsche 4.0 L Flat-6	977	(United Arab Emirates) Saif Al Ameri	P
(United Arab Emirates) RABDAN Motorsports	Porsche 992 GT3 Cup	Porsche 4.0 L Flat-6	977	(United Arab Emirates) Salem Al Ketbi	P
(United Arab Emirates) RABDAN Motorsports	Porsche 992 GT3 Cup	Porsche 4.0 L Flat-6	977	(United Arab Emirates) Helal Ali Mazrouei	P
(United Arab Emirates) RABDAN Motorsports	Porsche 992 GT3 Cup	Porsche 4.0 L Flat-6	977	(United Arab Emirates) Saeed Al Mehairi	P
(Belgium) Speed Lover	Porsche 992 GT3 Cup	Porsche 4.0 L Flat-6	979	(Belgium) Simon Balcaen	Am
(Belgium) Speed Lover	Porsche 992 GT3 Cup	Porsche 4.0 L Flat-6	979	(Belgium) Chris Maes	Am
(Belgium) Speed Lover	Porsche 992 GT3 Cup	Porsche 4.0 L Flat-6	979	(France) Steven Palette	Am
(Belgium) Speed Lover	Porsche 992 GT3 Cup	Porsche 4.0 L Flat-6	979	(Belgium) Philippe Wils	Am
(United Kingdom) DUEL RACING BY TORO VERDE	Porsche 992 GT3 Cup	Porsche 4.0 L Flat-6	995	(United Kingdom) Phil Keen	P
(United Kingdom) DUEL RACING BY TORO VERDE	Porsche 992 GT3 Cup	Porsche 4.0 L Flat-6	995	(United Arab Emirates) Nabil Moutran	P
(United Kingdom) DUEL RACING BY TORO VERDE	Porsche 992 GT3 Cup	Porsche 4.0 L Flat-6	995	(United Arab Emirates) Ramzi Moutran	P
(United Kingdom) DUEL RACING BY TORO VERDE	Porsche 992 GT3 Cup	Porsche 4.0 L Flat-6	995	(United Arab Emirates) Sami Moutran	P
GT4 (5 entries)
(United Arab Emirates) ROFGO with Dragon Racing	Mercedes-AMG GT4	Mercedes-AMG M178 4.0 L V8	408	(Germany) Benjamin Goethe	
(United Arab Emirates) ROFGO with Dragon Racing	Mercedes-AMG GT4	Mercedes-AMG M178 4.0 L V8	408	(Germany) Oliver Goethe	
(United Arab Emirates) ROFGO with Dragon Racing	Mercedes-AMG GT4	Mercedes-AMG M178 4.0 L V8	408	(Germany) Roald Goethe	
(United Arab Emirates) ROFGO with Dragon Racing	Mercedes-AMG GT4	Mercedes-AMG M178 4.0 L V8	408	(United Arab Emirates) Jordan Grogor	
(United Arab Emirates) ROFGO with Dragon Racing	Mercedes-AMG GT4	Mercedes-AMG M178 4.0 L V8	408	(United Kingdom) Stuart Hall	
(United Arab Emirates) Dragon Racing	Mercedes-AMG GT4	Mercedes-AMG M178 4.0 L V8	488	(United Kingdom) Bradley Ellis	
(United Arab Emirates) Dragon Racing	Mercedes-AMG GT4	Mercedes-AMG M178 4.0 L V8	488	(United Kingdom) Charles Hollings	
(United Arab Emirates) Dragon Racing	Mercedes-AMG GT4	Mercedes-AMG M178 4.0 L V8	488	(Cyprus) Leonidas Loucas	
(United Arab Emirates) Dragon Racing	Mercedes-AMG GT4	Mercedes-AMG M178 4.0 L V8	488	(Cyprus) Rhea Loucas	
(United Kingdom) Century Motorsport	BMW M4 GT4 Gen II	BMW N55 3.0 L Twin-Turbo I6	429	(United Kingdom) Carl Cavers	
(United Kingdom) Century Motorsport	BMW M4 GT4 Gen II	BMW N55 3.0 L Twin-Turbo I6	429	(Scotland) Michael Johnston	
(United Kingdom) Century Motorsport	BMW M4 GT4 Gen II	BMW N55 3.0 L Twin-Turbo I6	429	(United Kingdom) Lewis Plato	
(United Kingdom) Century Motorsport	BMW M4 GT4 Gen II	BMW N55 3.0 L Twin-Turbo I6	429	(United Kingdom) Chris Salkeld	
(United Kingdom) Simpson Motorsport	BMW M4 GT4 Gen II	BMW N55 3.0 L Twin-Turbo I6	438	(United Kingdom) James Kell	
(United Kingdom) Simpson Motorsport	BMW M4 GT4 Gen II	BMW N55 3.0 L Twin-Turbo I6	438	(United Kingdom) David Holloway	
(United Kingdom) Simpson Motorsport	BMW M4 GT4 Gen II	BMW N55 3.0 L Twin-Turbo I6	438	(United Kingdom) James Kaye	
(United Kingdom) Simpson Motorsport	BMW M4 GT4 Gen II	BMW N55 3.0 L Twin-Turbo I6	438	(Papua New Guinea) Keith Kassulke	
(United States) RHC Jorgensen-Strom by Century	BMW M4 GT4	BMW N55 3.0 L Twin-Turbo I6	450	(Netherlands) Jeroen Bleekemolen	
(United States) RHC Jorgensen-Strom by Century	BMW M4 GT4	BMW N55 3.0 L Twin-Turbo I6	450	(Netherlands) Danny van Dongen	
(United States) RHC Jorgensen-Strom by Century	BMW M4 GT4	BMW N55 3.0 L Twin-Turbo I6	450	(United Kingdom) Nathan Freke	
(United States) RHC Jorgensen-Strom by Century	BMW M4 GT4	BMW N55 3.0 L Twin-Turbo I6	450	(United States) Daren Jorgensen	
(United States) RHC Jorgensen-Strom by Century	BMW M4 GT4	BMW N55 3.0 L Twin-Turbo I6	450	(United States) Brett Strom	
TCR (5 entries)
(France) 700 Miles	Volkswagen Golf GTI TCR	Volkswagen 2.0 L I4	106	(France) Thierry Chkondali	
(France) 700 Miles	Volkswagen Golf GTI TCR	Volkswagen 2.0 L I4	106	(France) Marc Girard	
(France) 700 Miles	Volkswagen Golf GTI TCR	Volkswagen 2.0 L I4	106	(France) Jordan Mougenot	
(France) 700 Miles	Volkswagen Golf GTI TCR	Volkswagen 2.0 L I4	106	(Canada) Michel Sallenbach	
(France) 700 Miles	Volkswagen Golf GTI TCR	Volkswagen 2.0 L I4	106	(Belgium) Fabian Duffieux	
(Switzerland) Wolf-Power Racing	Audi RS 3 LMS TCR (2021)	Volkswagen 2.0 L I4	117	(Germany) Marcus Menden	
(Switzerland) Wolf-Power Racing	Audi RS 3 LMS TCR (2021)	Volkswagen 2.0 L I4	117	(Germany) Marlon Menden	
(Switzerland) Wolf-Power Racing	Audi RS 3 LMS TCR (2021)	Volkswagen 2.0 L I4	117	(Germany) Peter Posavac	
(Switzerland) Wolf-Power Racing	Audi RS 3 LMS TCR (2021)	Volkswagen 2.0 L I4	117	(United Kingdom) Robert Huff	
(Switzerland) Wolf-Power Racing	Audi RS 3 LMS TCR (2021)	Volkswagen 2.0 L I4	121	(Switzerland) Jasmin Preisig	
(Switzerland) Wolf-Power Racing	Audi RS 3 LMS TCR (2021)	Volkswagen 2.0 L I4	121	(Latvia) Ivars Vallers	
(Switzerland) Wolf-Power Racing	Audi RS 3 LMS TCR (2021)	Volkswagen 2.0 L I4	121	(Sweden) Calle Bergman	
(Switzerland) Wolf-Power Racing	Audi RS 3 LMS TCR (2021)	Volkswagen 2.0 L I4	121	(Austria) Andreas Höfler	
(Belgium) AC Motorsport	Audi RS 3 LMS TCR (2021)	Volkswagen 2.0 L I4	188	(France) Stephane Perrin	
(Belgium) AC Motorsport	Audi RS 3 LMS TCR (2021)	Volkswagen 2.0 L I4	188	(Switzerland) Yannick Mettler	
(Belgium) AC Motorsport	Audi RS 3 LMS TCR (2021)	Volkswagen 2.0 L I4	188	(Switzerland) Miklas Born	
(Belgium) AC Motorsport	Audi RS 3 LMS TCR (2021)	Volkswagen 2.0 L I4	188	(Belgium) Sam Dejonghe	
(Belgium) AC Motorsport	Audi RS 3 LMS TCR (2017)	Volkswagen 2.0 L I4	199	(Hong Kong) Andy Yan	
(Belgium) AC Motorsport	Audi RS 3 LMS TCR (2017)	Volkswagen 2.0 L I4	199	(Hong Kong) Tommy Ku	
(Belgium) AC Motorsport	Audi RS 3 LMS TCR (2017)	Volkswagen 2.0 L I4	199	(Hong Kong) David Lau	
(Belgium) AC Motorsport	Audi RS 3 LMS TCR (2017)	Volkswagen 2.0 L I4	199	(Hong Kong) Shaun Thong	
TCX (1 entry)
(Germany) Team Sorg Rennsport	Porsche 718 Cayman GT4 CS	Porsche 3.8 L Flat-6	227	(Mexico) Benito Tagle	
(Germany) Team Sorg Rennsport	Porsche 718 Cayman GT4 CS	Porsche 3.8 L Flat-6	227	(Germany) Christoph Krombach	
(Germany) Team Sorg Rennsport	Porsche 718 Cayman GT4 CS	Porsche 3.8 L Flat-6	227	(Germany) Daniel Gregor	
(Germany) Team Sorg Rennsport	Porsche 718 Cayman GT4 CS	Porsche 3.8 L Flat-6	227	(Switzerland) Patrik Grütter	

GT3 entries
Icon	Class
P	GT3-Pro
PA	GT3-Pro Am
Am	GT3-Am
992 entries
Icon	Class
P	992-Pro
Am	992-Am

== Results ==
=== Qualifying ===
Pole positions in each class are denoted in bold.

==== GT ====
Fastest in class in **bold**.

Pos.	Class	No.	Team	Time
1	**GT3-Pro**	**777**	**(Oman) Al Manar Racing by HRT**	**1:59.791**
2	GT3-Pro	4	(United Arab Emirates) Abu Dhabi Racing by HRT Bilstein	2:00.150
3	GT3-Pro	911	(Germany) Pure Rxcing	2:00.209
4 ^{1}	GT3-Pro	7	(Saudi Arabia) MS7 by WRT	2:00.319
5	GT3-Pro	10	(Australia) Grove Racing	2:00.328
6	GT3-Pro	99	(Italy) Tresor by Attempto Racing	2:00.419
7	**GT3-Pro Am**	**27**	**(United States) Heart of Racing Team by SPS**	**2:00.524**
8	GT3-Pro	46	(Italy) KFC VR46 with Team WRT	2:00.840
9	GT3-Pro	32	(Netherlands) Team GP-Elite	2:00.981
10	GT3-Pro Am	2	(France) Visiom	2:01.024
11	GT3-Pro Am	92	(Germany) Herberth Motorsport	2:01.036
12	GT3-Pro	26	(France) Saintéloc Junior Team	2:01.148
13	GT3-Pro Am	91	(Germany) Lionspeed by Herberth Motorsport	2:01.239
14	**GT3-Am**	**76**	**(United Kingdom) 7TSIX**	**2:01.242**
15	GT3-Pro Am	1	(Germany) Phoenix Racing	2:01.545
16	GT3-Pro Am	19	(Netherlands) MP Motorsport	2:01.751
17	GT3-Pro Am	14	(Denmark) Poulsen Motorsport	2:02.006
18	GT3-Am	85	(United States) CP Racing	2:02.049
19	GT3-Pro Am	43	(Germany) P1 Groupe by MRS GT Racing	2:03.031
20	GT3-Pro	48	(United Arab Emirates) S’Aalocin by Kox Racing	2:03.219
21	**992-Pro**	**955**	**(Romania) Willi Motorsport by Ebimotors**	**2:04.141**
22 ^{2}	992-Pro	961	(Switzerland) Fach Auto Tech	2:04.384
23	992-Pro	909	(Netherlands) Red Camel-Jordans.nl	2:04.512
24 ^{3}	992-Pro	962	(Switzerland) Fach Auto Tech	2:04.528
25	**992-Am**	**979**	**(Belgium) Speed Lover**	**2:05.384**
26	992-Pro	995	(United Kingdom) Duel Racing by Toro Verde	2:05.763
27	992-Am	928	(Germany) NKPP by HRT Performance	2:05.974
28	992-Am	929	QMMF by HRT Thuraya Qatar	2:06.254
29	**GTX**	**714**	**(Austria) razoon-more than racing**	**2:06.715**
30	992-Am	907	(Luxembourg) SebLajoux Racing by DUWO Racing	2:06.865
31	992-Am	925	(Germany) Huber Racing	2:06.946
32 ^{5}	992-Am	988	(Germany) MRS GT-Racing	2:07.636
33 ^{4}	992-Pro	977	(United Arab Emirates) RABDAN Motorsports	2:08.488
34	992-Am	990	(Germany) MRS GT-Racing	2:08.646
35	GTX	701	(France) Vortex V8	2:08.814
36	992-Am	989	(Germany) MRS GT-Racing	2:09.003
37	GTX	702	(France) Vortex V8	2:10.644
38	992-Am	908	(Luxembourg) SebLajoux Racing by DUWO Racing	2:06.037
39	992-Am	932	(Germany) HRT Performance	2:09.432
40	GT3-Pro	21	(Antigua and Barbuda) HAAS RT	2:00.671
41	992-Am	931	(Germany) HRT Performance	2:06.403
42	992-Am	930	QMMF by HRT Thuraya Qatar	No time

Notes
The following cars received a drop of start grid positions as a result of Race Director decisions:

- **^1** Car 7 – 2 positions
- **^2** Car 961 – 3 positions
- **^3** Car 962 – 3 positions
- **^4** Car 977 – 5 positions
- **^5** Car 988 – 5 positions

==== TCE ====
Fastest in class in **bold**.

Pos.	Class	No.	Team	Time
1	**GT4**	**408**	**(United Kingdom) ROFGO with Dragon Racing**	**2:10.411**
2	GT4	450	(United States) RHC Jorgensen-Strom by Century	2:10.441
3	GT4	438	(United Kingdom) Simpson Motorsport	2:10.747
4	GT4	429	(United Kingdom) Century Motorsport	2:11.234
5	**TCR**	**121**	**(Switzerland) Wolf-Power Racing**	**2:11.942**
6	**TCX**	**227**	**(Germany) Team Sorg Rennsport**	**2:13.895**
7	TCR	106	(France) 700 Miles	2:16.505
8	TCR	117	(Switzerland) Wolf-Power Racing	2:12.770
9	TCR	188	(Belgium) AC Motorsport	2:10.256
10	TCR	199	(Belgium) AC Motorsport	2:18.461
–	GT4	488	(United Arab Emirates) Dragon Racing	DNS

=== Race ===
Class winner in bold.

Pos	Class	No.	Team	Drivers	Chassis	Time/Reason	Laps
Pos	Class	No.	Team	Drivers	Engine	Time/Reason	Laps
1	**GT3-Pro**	**7**	**(Saudi Arabia) MS7 by BMW M Team WRT**	**(Saudi Arabia) Mohammed Saud Fahad Al Saud (Mexico) Diego Menchaca (France) Jean-Baptiste Simmenauer (Belgium) Dries Vanthoor (Germany) Jens Klingmann**	**BMW M4 GT3**	**24:00:16.529**	**621**
1	**GT3-Pro**	**7**	**(Saudi Arabia) MS7 by BMW M Team WRT**	**(Saudi Arabia) Mohammed Saud Fahad Al Saud (Mexico) Diego Menchaca (France) Jean-Baptiste Simmenauer (Belgium) Dries Vanthoor (Germany) Jens Klingmann**	**BMW S58B30T0 3.0 L Turbo I6**	**24:00:16.529**	**621**
2	**GT3-Pro Am**	**91**	**(Germany) Herberth Motorsport**	**(Switzerland) Daniel Allemann (Germany) Ralf Bohn (Germany) Alfred Renauer (Germany) Robert Renauer**	**Porsche 911 GT3 R**	**+31.761**	**621**
2	**GT3-Pro Am**	**91**	**(Germany) Herberth Motorsport**	**(Switzerland) Daniel Allemann (Germany) Ralf Bohn (Germany) Alfred Renauer (Germany) Robert Renauer**	**Porsche 4.0 L Flat-6**	**+31.761**	**621**
3	GT3-Pro	46	(Italy) KFC VR46 by BMW M Team WRT	(Indonesia) Sean Gelael (Belgium) Maxime Martin (Italy) Valentino Rossi (United Kingdom) Tim Whale (Germany) Max Hesse	BMW M4 GT3	+2 Laps	619
3	GT3-Pro	46	(Italy) KFC VR46 by BMW M Team WRT	(Indonesia) Sean Gelael (Belgium) Maxime Martin (Italy) Valentino Rossi (United Kingdom) Tim Whale (Germany) Max Hesse	BMW S58B30T0 3.0 L Turbo I6	+2 Laps	619
4	GT3-Pro	10	(Australia) Grove Racing	(New Zealand) Earl Bamber (Australia) Brenton Grove (Australia) Stephen Grove (Australia) Anton de Pasquale	Porsche 911 GT3 R	+3 Laps	618
4	GT3-Pro	10	(Australia) Grove Racing	(New Zealand) Earl Bamber (Australia) Brenton Grove (Australia) Stephen Grove (Australia) Anton de Pasquale	Porsche 4.0 L Flat-6	+3 Laps	618
5	GT3-Pro	21	(Antigua and Barbuda) HAAS RT	(Belgium) Olivier Bertels (Belgium) Mathieu Detry (Germany) Benjamin Mazatis (Belgium) Maxime Soulet (Belgium) Frédéric Vervisch	Audi R8 LMS Evo II	+3 Laps	618
5	GT3-Pro	21	(Antigua and Barbuda) HAAS RT	(Belgium) Olivier Bertels (Belgium) Mathieu Detry (Germany) Benjamin Mazatis (Belgium) Maxime Soulet (Belgium) Frédéric Vervisch	Audi 5.2 L V10	+3 Laps	618
6	GT3-Pro Am	92	(Germany) Herberth Motorsport	(United States) Adam Adelson (United States) Jason Hart (United States) Seth Lucas (United States) Elliott Skeer	Porsche 911 GT3 R	+5 Laps	616
6	GT3-Pro Am	92	(Germany) Herberth Motorsport	(United States) Adam Adelson (United States) Jason Hart (United States) Seth Lucas (United States) Elliott Skeer	Porsche 4.0 L Flat-6	+5 Laps	616
7	GT3-Pro	32	(Netherlands) Team GP-Elite	(Netherlands) Lucas Groeneveld (Netherlands) Daan van Kuijk (Netherlands) Jesse van Kuijk (Netherlands) Max van Splunteren	Porsche 911 GT3 R	+6 Laps	615
7	GT3-Pro	32	(Netherlands) Team GP-Elite	(Netherlands) Lucas Groeneveld (Netherlands) Daan van Kuijk (Netherlands) Jesse van Kuijk (Netherlands) Max van Splunteren	Porsche 4.0 L Flat-6	+6 Laps	615
8	GT3-Pro Am	27	(United States) Heart of Racing by SPS	(Canada) Roman De Angelis (United Kingdom) Ian James (United States) Gray Newell (United Kingdom) Ross Gunn	Mercedes-AMG GT3 Evo	+7 Laps	614
8	GT3-Pro Am	27	(United States) Heart of Racing by SPS	(Canada) Roman De Angelis (United Kingdom) Ian James (United States) Gray Newell (United Kingdom) Ross Gunn	Mercedes-AMG M159 6.2 L V8	+7 Laps	614
9	**GT3-Am**	**85**	**(United States) CP Racing**	**(United States) Charles Espenlaub (United States) Joe Foster (United States) Shane Lewis (United States) Charles Putman (United Kingdom) Phil Quaife**	**Mercedes-AMG GT3 Evo**	**+7 Laps**	**614**
9	**GT3-Am**	**85**	**(United States) CP Racing**	**(United States) Charles Espenlaub (United States) Joe Foster (United States) Shane Lewis (United States) Charles Putman (United Kingdom) Phil Quaife**	**Mercedes-AMG M159 6.2 L V8**	**+7 Laps**	**614**
10	GT3-Pro Am	1	(Germany) Phoenix Racing	(Austria) Michael Doppelmayr (Germany) Pierre Kaffer (Germany) Elia Erhart (Germany) Christer Jöns	Audi R8 LMS Evo II	+13 Laps	608
10	GT3-Pro Am	1	(Germany) Phoenix Racing	(Austria) Michael Doppelmayr (Germany) Pierre Kaffer (Germany) Elia Erhart (Germany) Christer Jöns	Audi 5.2 L V10	+13 Laps	608
11	**992 Pro**	**962**	**(Switzerland) Fach Auto Tech**	**(Netherlands) Huub van Eijndhoven (Germany) Matthias Hoffsümmer (Luxembourg) Gabriele Rindone (Germany) Alexander Schwarzer (Netherlands) Larry ten Voorde**	**Porsche 992 GT3 Cup**	**+21 Laps**	**600**
11	**992 Pro**	**962**	**(Switzerland) Fach Auto Tech**	**(Netherlands) Huub van Eijndhoven (Germany) Matthias Hoffsümmer (Luxembourg) Gabriele Rindone (Germany) Alexander Schwarzer (Netherlands) Larry ten Voorde**	**Porsche 4.0 L Flat-6**	**+21 Laps**	**600**
12	992 Pro	961	(Switzerland) Fach Auto Tech	(Switzerland) Alexander Fach (Switzerland) Peter Hegglin (Switzerland) Jan Klingelnberg (Germany) Christof Langer (Austria) Christopher Zöchling	Porsche 992 GT3 Cup	+24 Laps	597
12	992 Pro	961	(Switzerland) Fach Auto Tech	(Switzerland) Alexander Fach (Switzerland) Peter Hegglin (Switzerland) Jan Klingelnberg (Germany) Christof Langer (Austria) Christopher Zöchling	Porsche 4.0 L Flat-6	+24 Laps	597
13	GT3-Pro Am	2	(France) Visiom	(France) Jean-Bernard Bouvet (France) Romain Iannetta (France) Jean-Paul Pagny (France) Christophe Tinseau (France) Dino Lunardi	Ferrari 488 GT3 Evo 2020	+27 Laps	594
13	GT3-Pro Am	2	(France) Visiom	(France) Jean-Bernard Bouvet (France) Romain Iannetta (France) Jean-Paul Pagny (France) Christophe Tinseau (France) Dino Lunardi	Ferrari 3.9 L Twin-Turbo V8	+27 Laps	594
14	992 Pro	995	(United Kingdom) Duel Racing by Toro Verde	(United Kingdom) Phil Keen (United Arab Emirates) Nabil Moutran (United Arab Emirates) Ramzi Moutran (United Arab Emirates) Sami Moutran	Porsche 992 GT3 Cup	+30 Laps	591
14	992 Pro	995	(United Kingdom) Duel Racing by Toro Verde	(United Kingdom) Phil Keen (United Arab Emirates) Nabil Moutran (United Arab Emirates) Ramzi Moutran (United Arab Emirates) Sami Moutran	Porsche 4.0 L Flat-6	+30 Laps	591
15	**992 Am**	**925**	**(Germany) Huber Racing**	**(Germany) Stefan Aust (Germany) Steffen Görig (Germany) Klaus Rader (Germany) Hans Wehrmann (Germany) Nico Menzel**	**Porsche 992 GT3 Cup**	**+30 Laps**	**591**
15	**992 Am**	**925**	**(Germany) Huber Racing**	**(Germany) Stefan Aust (Germany) Steffen Görig (Germany) Klaus Rader (Germany) Hans Wehrmann (Germany) Nico Menzel**	**Porsche 4.0 L Flat-6**	**+30 Laps**	**591**
16	992 Pro	955	(Romania) Willi Motorsport by Ebimotors	(Italy) Fabrizio Broggi (Italy) Sabino de Castro (Romania) Sergiu Nicolae	Porsche 992 GT3 Cup	+31 Laps	590
16	992 Pro	955	(Romania) Willi Motorsport by Ebimotors	(Italy) Fabrizio Broggi (Italy) Sabino de Castro (Romania) Sergiu Nicolae	Porsche 4.0 L Flat-6	+31 Laps	590
17	992 Am	929	QMMF by HRT Thuraya Qatar	(Qatar) Abdulla Ali Al-Khelaifi (Qatar) Ghanim Al Maadheed (Qatar) Ibrahim Al Abdulghani (Germany) Julian Hanses	Porsche 992 GT3 Cup	+31 Laps	590
17	992 Am	929	QMMF by HRT Thuraya Qatar	(Qatar) Abdulla Ali Al-Khelaifi (Qatar) Ghanim Al Maadheed (Qatar) Ibrahim Al Abdulghani (Germany) Julian Hanses	Porsche 4.0 L Flat-6	+31 Laps	590
18	992 Am	928	(Germany) NKPP by HRT Performance	(Netherlands) Mark van der Aa (Netherlands) Gijs Bessem (Netherlands) Bob Herber (Netherlands) Harry Hilders	Porsche 992 GT3 Cup	+36 Laps	585
18	992 Am	928	(Germany) NKPP by HRT Performance	(Netherlands) Mark van der Aa (Netherlands) Gijs Bessem (Netherlands) Bob Herber (Netherlands) Harry Hilders	Porsche 4.0 L Flat-6	+36 Laps	585
19	GT3 Pro	92	(Lithuania) Pure Rxcing	(United Kingdom) Harry King (United Kingdom) Alex Malykhin (Germany) Sven Müller (Germany) Joel Sturm	Porsche 911 GT3 R	+43 Laps	578
19	GT3 Pro	92	(Lithuania) Pure Rxcing	(United Kingdom) Harry King (United Kingdom) Alex Malykhin (Germany) Sven Müller (Germany) Joel Sturm	Porsche 4.0 L Flat-6	+43 Laps	578
20	992 Am	908	(Luxembourg) SebLajoux Racing by DUWO Racing	(France) Lionel Rigaud (France) Sebastien Lajoux (France) Jean-Christophe David (France) Mathys Jaubert (France) Gabriel Pemeant	Porsche 992 GT3 Cup	+44 Laps	577
20	992 Am	908	(Luxembourg) SebLajoux Racing by DUWO Racing	(France) Lionel Rigaud (France) Sebastien Lajoux (France) Jean-Christophe David (France) Mathys Jaubert (France) Gabriel Pemeant	Porsche 4.0 L Flat-6	+44 Laps	577
21	GT3 am	48	(United Arab Emirates) S’Aalocin by Kox Racing	(Netherlands) Peter Kox (Netherlands) Stéphane Kox (Netherlands) Nico Pronk (Netherlands) Dennis Retera (Belgium) Tom Boonen	Porsche 911 GT3 R	+49 Laps	572
21	GT3 am	48	(United Arab Emirates) S’Aalocin by Kox Racing	(Netherlands) Peter Kox (Netherlands) Stéphane Kox (Netherlands) Nico Pronk (Netherlands) Dennis Retera (Belgium) Tom Boonen	Porsche 4.0 L Flat-6	+49 Laps	572
22 DNF	992 Am	989	(Germany) MRS GT-Racing	(Kazakhstan) Alexandr Artemyev (Belgium) Rodrigue Gillion (Kyrgyzstan) Andrey Solukovtsev (Mexico) Rafael Vallina (Belgium) Nico Verdonck	Porsche 992 GT3 Cup	+53 Laps	568
22 DNF	992 Am	989	(Germany) MRS GT-Racing	(Kazakhstan) Alexandr Artemyev (Belgium) Rodrigue Gillion (Kyrgyzstan) Andrey Solukovtsev (Mexico) Rafael Vallina (Belgium) Nico Verdonck	Porsche 4.0 L Flat-6	+53 Laps	568
23	**GT4**	**408**	**(United Arab Emirates) ROFGO with Dragon Racing**	**(Germany) Benjamin Goethe** **(Germany) Oliver Goethe** **(Germany) Roald Goethe** **(United Arab Emirates) Jordan Grogor** **(United Kingdom) Stuart Hall**	**Mercedes-AMG GT4**	**+55 Laps**	**566**
23	**GT4**	**408**	**(United Arab Emirates) ROFGO with Dragon Racing**	**(Germany) Benjamin Goethe** **(Germany) Oliver Goethe** **(Germany) Roald Goethe** **(United Arab Emirates) Jordan Grogor** **(United Kingdom) Stuart Hall**	**Mercedes-AMG M178 4.0 L V8**	**+55 Laps**	**566**
24	**GTX**	**714**	**(Austria) razoon-more than racing**	**(Austria) Bob Bau** **(Austria) Daniel Drexel** **(Austria) Ernst Kirchmayr** **(Austria) Leo Pichler** **(Austria) Kris Rosenberger**	**KTM X-Bow GTX**	**+59 Laps**	**562**
24	**GTX**	**714**	**(Austria) razoon-more than racing**	**(Austria) Bob Bau** **(Austria) Daniel Drexel** **(Austria) Ernst Kirchmayr** **(Austria) Leo Pichler** **(Austria) Kris Rosenberger**	**Audi 2.5 L I5**	**+59 Laps**	**562**
25	**TCR**	**188**	**(Belgium) AC Motorsport**	**(France) Stephane Perrin** **(Switzerland) Yannick Mettler** **(Switzerland) Miklas Born** **(Belgium) Sam Dejonghe**	**Audi RS 3 LMS TCR (2021)**	**+59 Laps**	**562**
25	**TCR**	**188**	**(Belgium) AC Motorsport**	**(France) Stephane Perrin** **(Switzerland) Yannick Mettler** **(Switzerland) Miklas Born** **(Belgium) Sam Dejonghe**	**Volkswagen 2.0 L I4**	**+59 Laps**	**562**
26	GT4	438	(United Kingdom) Simpson Motorsport	(United Kingdom) James Kell (United Kingdom) David Holloway (United Kingdom) James Kaye (Papua New Guinea) Keith Kassulke	BMW M4 GT4 Gen II	+59 Laps	562
26	GT4	438	(United Kingdom) Simpson Motorsport	(United Kingdom) James Kell (United Kingdom) David Holloway (United Kingdom) James Kaye (Papua New Guinea) Keith Kassulke	BMW N55 3.0 L Twin-Turbo I6	+59 Laps	562
27 DNF	GT3-pro-am	14	(Denmark) Poulsen Motorsport	(Denmark) Gustav Birch (Denmark) Kasper H. Jensen (Denmark) Kristian Poulsen (Denmark) Roland Poulsen	BMW M4 GT3	+74 Laps	547
27 DNF	GT3-pro-am	14	(Denmark) Poulsen Motorsport	(Denmark) Gustav Birch (Denmark) Kasper H. Jensen (Denmark) Kristian Poulsen (Denmark) Roland Poulsen	BMW S58B30T0 3.0 L Turbo I6	+74 Laps	547
28	GT4	429	(United Kingdom) Century Motorsport	(United Kingdom) Carl Cavers (Scotland) Michael Johnston (United Kingdom) Lewis Plato (United Kingdom) Chris Salkeld	BMW M4 GT4 Gen II	+81 Laps	540
28	GT4	429	(United Kingdom) Century Motorsport	(United Kingdom) Carl Cavers (Scotland) Michael Johnston (United Kingdom) Lewis Plato (United Kingdom) Chris Salkeld	BMW N55 3.0 L Twin-Turbo I6	+81 Laps	540
29	992 Am	931	(Germany) HRT Performance	(Germany) Holger Harmsen (Germany) Fidel Leib (South Africa) Mikaeel Pitamber	Porsche 992 GT3 Cup	+84 Laps	537
29	992 Am	931	(Germany) HRT Performance	(Germany) Holger Harmsen (Germany) Fidel Leib (South Africa) Mikaeel Pitamber	Porsche 4.0 L Flat-6	+84 Laps	537
30	TCR	117	(Switzerland) Wolf-Power Racing	(Germany) Peter Posavac (Germany) Marcus Menden (Germany) Marlon Menden (United Kingdom) Robert Huff	Audi RS 3 LMS TCR (2021)	+109 Laps	512
30	TCR	117	(Switzerland) Wolf-Power Racing	(Germany) Peter Posavac (Germany) Marcus Menden (Germany) Marlon Menden (United Kingdom) Robert Huff	Volkswagen 2.0 L I4	+109 Laps	512
31	**TCX**	**227**	**(Germany) Team Sorg Rennsport**	**(Mexico) Benito Tagle** **(Germany) Christoph Krombach** **(Germany) Daniel Gregor** **(Switzerland) Patrik Grütter**	**Porsche 718 Cayman GT4 CS**	**+113 Laps**	**508**
31	**TCX**	**227**	**(Germany) Team Sorg Rennsport**	**(Mexico) Benito Tagle** **(Germany) Christoph Krombach** **(Germany) Daniel Gregor** **(Switzerland) Patrik Grütter**	**Porsche 3.8 L Flat-6**	**+113 Laps**	**508**
32	992 am	907	(Luxembourg) SebLajoux Racing by DUWO Racing	(France) Alexandre de Bernardinis (Switzerland) Gislain Genecand (France) Xavier Michel (France) Gabriel Pemeant	Porsche 992 GT3 Cup	+113 Laps	508
32	992 am	907	(Luxembourg) SebLajoux Racing by DUWO Racing	(France) Alexandre de Bernardinis (Switzerland) Gislain Genecand (France) Xavier Michel (France) Gabriel Pemeant	Porsche 4.0 L Flat-6	+113 Laps	508
33	992 Am	990	(Germany) MRS GT-Racing	(Germany) Andreas Gülden (Germany) Marc Hennerici (Germany) Alex Herbst (United States) Peter Pejacsevich	Porsche 992 GT3 Cup	+120 Laps	501
33	992 Am	990	(Germany) MRS GT-Racing	(Germany) Andreas Gülden (Germany) Marc Hennerici (Germany) Alex Herbst (United States) Peter Pejacsevich	Porsche 4.0 L Flat-6	+120 Laps	501
34	GTX	701	(France) Vortex V8	(France) Lionel Amrouche (France) Philippe Bonnel (France) Philippe Gruau (France) Tom Pieri	Vortex 1.0 GTX	+120 Laps	501
34	GTX	701	(France) Vortex V8	(France) Lionel Amrouche (France) Philippe Bonnel (France) Philippe Gruau (France) Tom Pieri	Chevrolet 6.2 L V8	+120 Laps	501
35 DNF	GT3-pro-am	19	(Netherlands) MP Motorsport	(Netherlands) Bert de Heus (Netherlands) Daniël de Jong (Netherlands) Henk de Jong (Netherlands) Jaap van Lagen	Mercedes-AMG GT3 Evo	+121 Laps	500
35 DNF	GT3-pro-am	19	(Netherlands) MP Motorsport	(Netherlands) Bert de Heus (Netherlands) Daniël de Jong (Netherlands) Henk de Jong (Netherlands) Jaap van Lagen	Mercedes-AMG M159 6.2 L V8	+121 Laps	500
36	992 Am	979	(Belgium) Speed Lover	(Belgium) Simon Balcaen (Belgium) Chris Maes (France) Steven Palette (Belgium) Philippe Wils	Porsche 992 GT3 Cup	+130 Laps	491
36	992 Am	979	(Belgium) Speed Lover	(Belgium) Simon Balcaen (Belgium) Chris Maes (France) Steven Palette (Belgium) Philippe Wils	Porsche 4.0 L Flat-6	+130 Laps	491
37	TCR	121	(Switzerland) Wolf-Power Racing	(Switzerland) Jasmin Preisig (Latvia) Ivars Vallers (Sweden) Calle Bergman (Austria) Andreas Höfler	Audi RS 3 LMS TCR (2021)	+148 Laps	473
37	TCR	121	(Switzerland) Wolf-Power Racing	(Switzerland) Jasmin Preisig (Latvia) Ivars Vallers (Sweden) Calle Bergman (Austria) Andreas Höfler	Volkswagen 2.0 L I4	+148 Laps	473
38 DNF	GTX	702	(France) Vortex V8	(France) Miguel Moiola (France) Philippe Fertoret (Switzerland) Nicolas Nobs (France) Lucas Sugliano	Vortex 1.0 GTX	+160 Laps	461
38 DNF	GTX	702	(France) Vortex V8	(France) Miguel Moiola (France) Philippe Fertoret (Switzerland) Nicolas Nobs (France) Lucas Sugliano	Chevrolet 6.2 L V8	+160 Laps	461
39 DNF	992 pro	977	(United Arab Emirates) RABDAN Motorsports	(United Arab Emirates) Saif Al Ameri (United Arab Emirates) Salem Al Ketbi (United Arab Emirates) Helal Ali Mazrouei (United Arab Emirates) Saeed Al Mehairi	Porsche 992 GT3 Cup	+162 Laps	459
39 DNF	992 pro	977	(United Arab Emirates) RABDAN Motorsports	(United Arab Emirates) Saif Al Ameri (United Arab Emirates) Salem Al Ketbi (United Arab Emirates) Helal Ali Mazrouei (United Arab Emirates) Saeed Al Mehairi	Porsche 4.0 L Flat-6	+162 Laps	459
40 DNF	GT3-am	76	(United Kingdom) 7TSIX	(United Kingdom) James Cottingham (United Kingdom) Andrew Gilbert-Scott (Spain) Fran Rueda (Slovakia) Matúš Výboh	McLaren 720S GT3	+166 Laps	455
40 DNF	GT3-am	76	(United Kingdom) 7TSIX	(United Kingdom) James Cottingham (United Kingdom) Andrew Gilbert-Scott (Spain) Fran Rueda (Slovakia) Matúš Výboh	McLaren M840T 4.0 L Turbo V8	+166 Laps	455
41	TCR	106	(France) 700 Miles	(France) Thierry Chkondali (France) Marc Girard (France) Jordan Mougenot (Canada) Michel Sallenbach (Belgium) Fabian Duffieux	Volkswagen Golf GTI TCR	+173 Laps	448
41	TCR	106	(France) 700 Miles	(France) Thierry Chkondali (France) Marc Girard (France) Jordan Mougenot (Canada) Michel Sallenbach (Belgium) Fabian Duffieux	Volkswagen 2.0 L I4	+173 Laps	448
42 DNF	992 Am	930	QMMF by HRT Thuraya Qatar	(Qatar) Abdullah Al Abbasi (Qatar) Abdulaziz Al Jabri (Qatar) Ibrahim Al-Mannai	Porsche 992 GT3 Cup	+217 Laps	404
42 DNF	992 Am	930	QMMF by HRT Thuraya Qatar	(Qatar) Abdullah Al Abbasi (Qatar) Abdulaziz Al Jabri (Qatar) Ibrahim Al-Mannai	Porsche 4.0 L Flat-6	+217 Laps	404
43	TCR	199	(Belgium) AC Motorsport	(Hong Kong) Andy Yan (Hong Kong) Tommy Ku (Hong Kong) David Lau (Hong Kong) Shaun Thong	Audi RS 3 LMS TCR (2017)	+300 Laps	321
43	TCR	199	(Belgium) AC Motorsport	(Hong Kong) Andy Yan (Hong Kong) Tommy Ku (Hong Kong) David Lau (Hong Kong) Shaun Thong	Volkswagen 2.0 L I4	+300 Laps	321
DNF	GT3-Pro	26	(France) Saintéloc Junior Team	(Luxembourg) Christian Kelders (France) Simon Gachet (France) Erwan Bastard (France) Antoine Doquin (France) Gregoire Demoustier	Audi R8 LMS Evo II	+384 Laps	237
DNF	GT3-Pro	26	(France) Saintéloc Junior Team	(Luxembourg) Christian Kelders (France) Simon Gachet (France) Erwan Bastard (France) Antoine Doquin (France) Gregoire Demoustier	Audi 5.2 L V10	+384 Laps	237
DNF	GT3-Pro-am	43	(Germany) P1 Groupe by MRS GT Racing	(Finland) Jukka Honkavuori (Germany) Leon Köhler (United Kingdom) Alex Sedgwick (United States) Alex Vogel	Porsche 911 GT3 R	+448 Laps	173
DNF	GT3-Pro-am	43	(Germany) P1 Groupe by MRS GT Racing	(Finland) Jukka Honkavuori (Germany) Leon Köhler (United Kingdom) Alex Sedgwick (United States) Alex Vogel	Porsche 4.0 L Flat-6	+448 Laps	173
DNC	992 pro	909	(Netherlands) Red Camel-Jordans.nl	(Netherlands) Ivo Breukers (Netherlands) Luc Breukers (Netherlands) Rik Breukers (Switzerland) Fabian Danz	Porsche 992 GT3 Cup	+470 Laps	151
DNC	992 pro	909	(Netherlands) Red Camel-Jordans.nl	(Netherlands) Ivo Breukers (Netherlands) Luc Breukers (Netherlands) Rik Breukers (Switzerland) Fabian Danz	Porsche 4.0 L Flat-6	+470 Laps	151
DNF	GT3 pro	777	(Oman) Al Manar Racing by HRT	(United Arab Emirates) Khaled Al Qubaisi (France) Sébastien Baud (Andorra) Jules Gounon (Note: Jules Gounon is a French racing driver competing with an Andorran racing license.) (Germany) Hubert Haupt	Mercedes-AMG GT3 Evo	+485 Laps	136
DNF	GT3 pro	777	(Oman) Al Manar Racing by HRT	(United Arab Emirates) Khaled Al Qubaisi (France) Sébastien Baud (Andorra) Jules Gounon (Germany) Hubert Haupt	Mercedes-AMG M159 6.2 L V8	+485 Laps	136
DNF	GT3 pro	4	(United Arab Emirates) Abu Dhabi Racing by HRT Bilstein	(Oman) Al Faisal Al Zubair (Zimbabwe) Axcil Jefferies (Austria) Martin Konrad (Germany) Fabian Schiller (Germany) Luca Stolz	Mercedes-AMG GT3 Evo	+506 Laps	115
DNF	GT3 pro	4	(United Arab Emirates) Abu Dhabi Racing by HRT Bilstein	(Oman) Al Faisal Al Zubair (Zimbabwe) Axcil Jefferies (Austria) Martin Konrad (Germany) Fabian Schiller (Germany) Luca Stolz	Mercedes-AMG M159 6.2 L V8	+506 Laps	115
DNF	GT4	450	(United States) RHC Jorgensen-Strom by Century	(Netherlands) Jeroen Bleekemolen (Netherlands) Danny van Dongen (United Kingdom) Nathan Freke (United States) Daren Jorgensen (United States) Brett Strom	BMW M4 GT4	+507 Laps	114
DNF	GT4	450	(United States) RHC Jorgensen-Strom by Century	(Netherlands) Jeroen Bleekemolen (Netherlands) Danny van Dongen (United Kingdom) Nathan Freke (United States) Daren Jorgensen (United States) Brett Strom	BMW N55 3.0 L Twin-Turbo I6	+507 Laps	114
DNF	GT3 pro	99	(Germany) Attempto Racing	(Germany) Alex Aka (United Kingdom) Finlay Hutchison Andrey Mukovoz (Luxembourg) Dylan Pereira	Audi R8 LMS Evo II	+535 Laps	86
DNF	GT3 pro	99	(Germany) Attempto Racing	(Germany) Alex Aka (United Kingdom) Finlay Hutchison Andrey Mukovoz (Luxembourg) Dylan Pereira	Audi 5.2 L V10	+535 Laps	86
DNF	992 Am	988	(Germany) MRS GT-Racing	(Lithuania) Sigitas Ambrazevicius (Lithuania) Arunas Geciauskas (Estonia) Antti Rammo	Porsche 992 GT3 Cup	+536 Laps	85
DNF	992 Am	988	(Germany) MRS GT-Racing	(Lithuania) Sigitas Ambrazevicius (Lithuania) Arunas Geciauskas (Estonia) Antti Rammo	Porsche 4.0 L Flat-6	+536 Laps	85
DNF	992 Am	932	(Germany) HRT Performance	(France) Stéphane Adler (France) Michael Blanchemain (France) Jérôme Da Costa (France) Franck Leherpeur	Porsche 992 GT3 Cup	+601 Laps	20
DNF	992 Am	932	(Germany) HRT Performance	(France) Stéphane Adler (France) Michael Blanchemain (France) Jérôme Da Costa (France) Franck Leherpeur	Porsche 4.0 L Flat-6	+601 Laps	20
DNS	GT4	488	(United Arab Emirates) Dragon Racing	(United Kingdom) Bradley Ellis (United Kingdom) Charles Hollings (Cyprus) Leonidas Loucas (Cyprus) Rhea Loucas	Mercedes-AMG GT4		
DNS	GT4	488	(United Arab Emirates) Dragon Racing	(United Kingdom) Bradley Ellis (United Kingdom) Charles Hollings (Cyprus) Leonidas Loucas (Cyprus) Rhea Loucas	Mercedes-AMG M178 4.0 L V8		

== Notes ==
24H Series
Previous race: none	2023 season	Next race: 12 Hours of Mugello

24H TCE Series
Previous race: none	2023 season	Next race: 12 Hours of Mugello
