= James Kell =

British racing driver (born 1997)

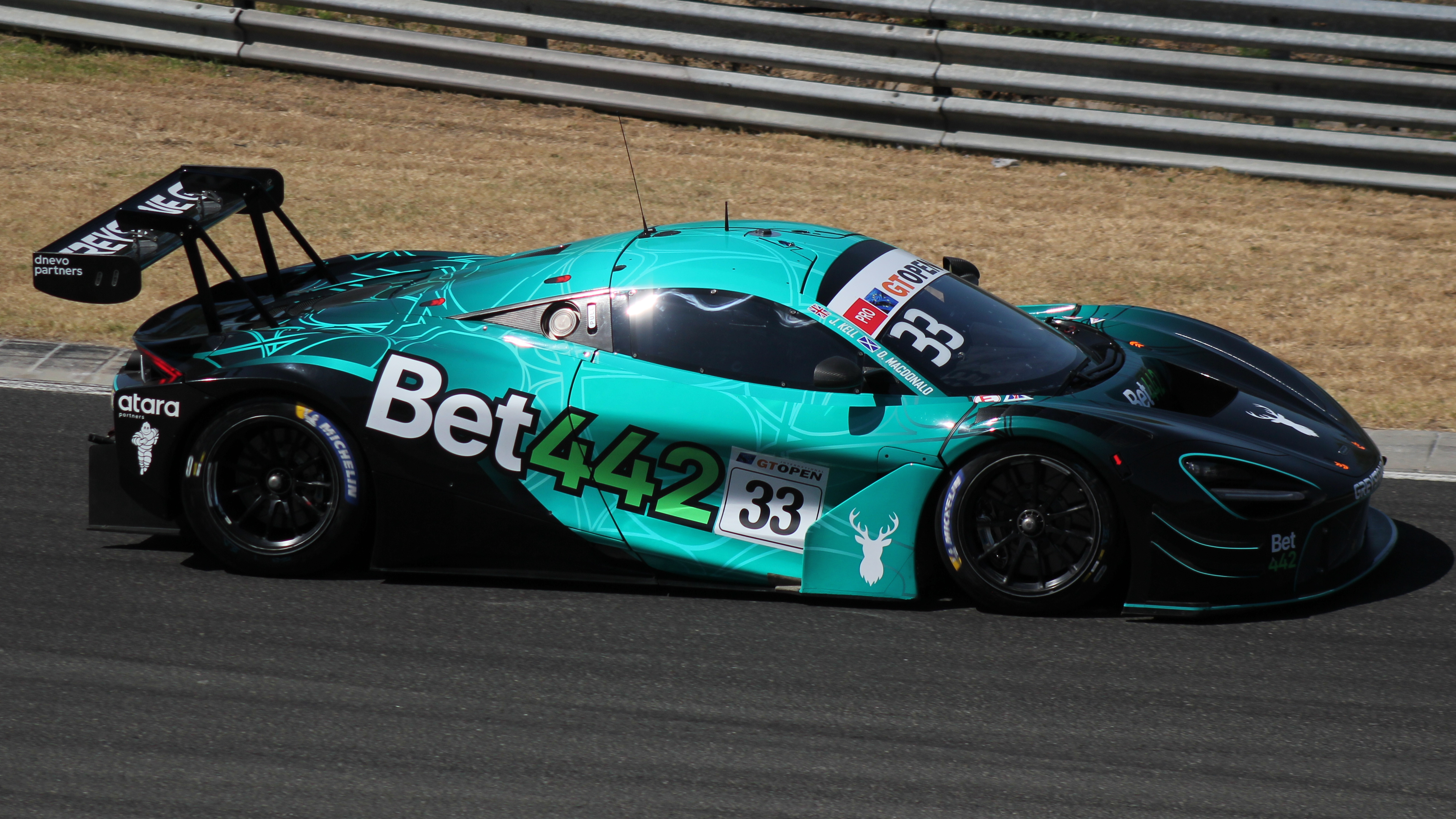
- Kell in 2025
- Nationality: (United Kingdom) British
- Born: James Richard Kell; 5 May 1997 (age 29) Morpeth, Northumberland, England
- Categorisation: FIA Silver

Championship titles
- 2020: 750MC Club Enduro – Class C

James Richard Kell (born 5 May 1997) is a British racing driver who last competed in GT World Challenge Europe for CSA Racing and International GT Open for Track Focused.

== Personal life ==
Kell is the son of Darren Kell, who is also a racing driver.

== Career ==
Kell began his racing career in 2018 by racing in the BRSCC MX-5 SuperCup, before joining Rob Boston Racing to compete in the Ginetta GT4 Supercup. Racing in the Amateur class in his only season in the series, Kell scored class wins at Silverstone and Brands Hatch, as well as nine more podiums en route to a third-place points finish.

Stepping up to GT4 competition for 2020, Kell joined Toyota-fielding Speedworks Motorsport to race in the British GT Championship. Racing alongside Sam Smelt, the pair scored a pair of GT4 Silver podiums in both races of the first Donington Park round, helping them end the year sixth in points. Remaining in the series for the following year, Kell switched to McLaren-affiliated Jenson Team Rocket RJN alongside Jordan Collard. In his sophomore season in the series, Kell scored a lone GT4 overall win at Snetterton and four Silver Cup podiums to secure runner-up honors in class.

Remaining with RJN for his step up to GT3 racing in 2022, Kell took a best overall result of sixth at Oulton Park and two Silver Cup wins as he ended the year runner-up in the GT3 Silver standings. Kell then made a brief return to GT4 competition, racing in the 2023 Dubai 24 Hour for BMW-fielding Simpson Motorsport, in which he finished second in class. For the rest of the year, Kell returned to the British GT Championship's GT3 Silver class for McLaren-fielding Race Lab alongside Iain Campbell. In his only season with the team, Kell won in class both races at Oulton Park and scored three further class podiums as he ended the year third in points. During 2023, Kell also raced for BMW-fielding Walkenhorst in the GT World Challenge Europe Endurance Cup, as well as making a one-off appearance in the Sprint Cup at Valencia for Lamborghini-fielding GSM AB1 GT3 Team.

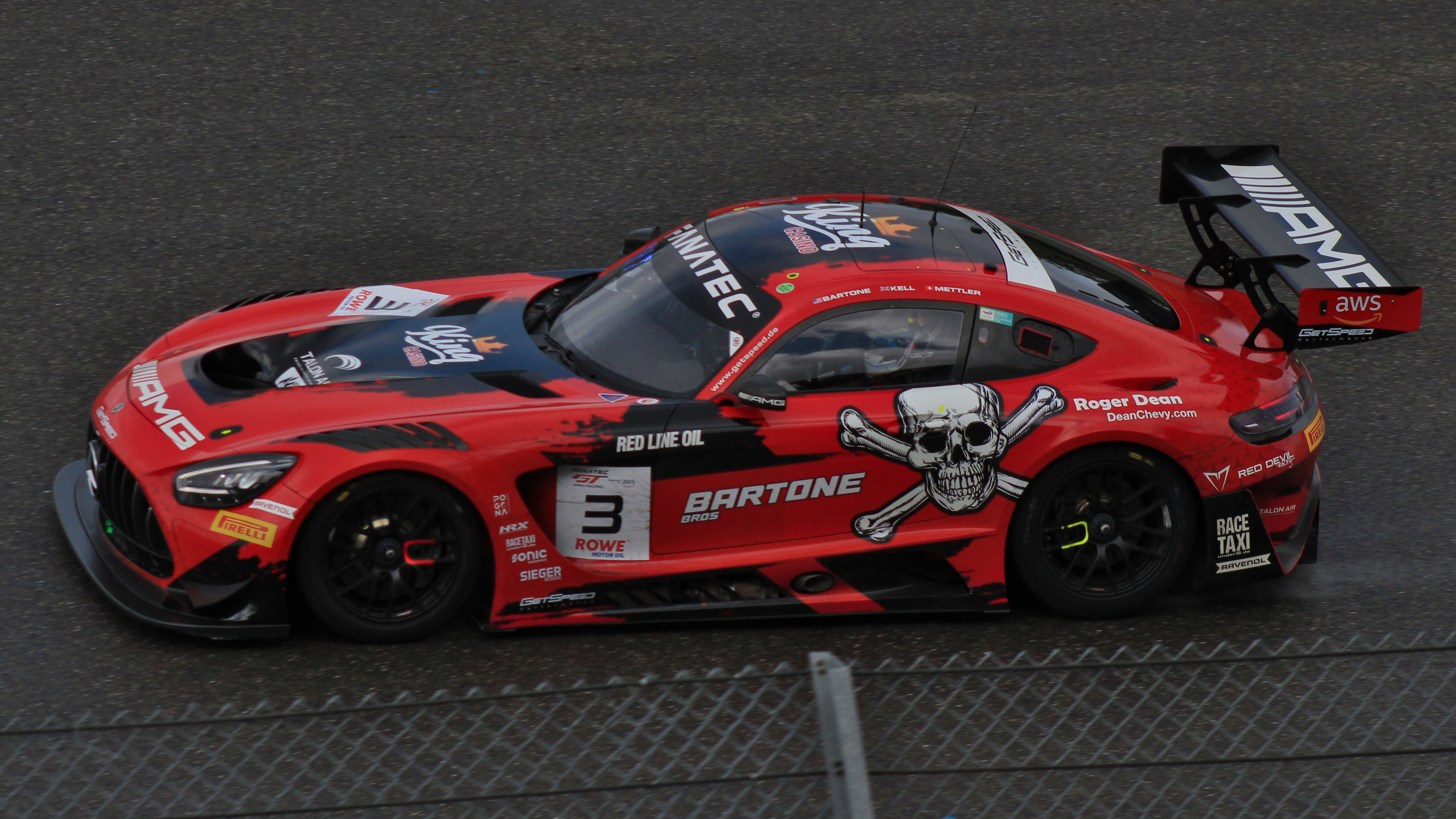
Kell's Bartone-liveried Mercedes at the Nürburgring in 2024.

In 2024, Kell switched to AMG-affiliated GetSpeed for his sophomore season in the GT World Challenge Europe Endurance Cup alongside Anthony Bartone and Yannick Mettler. In his only season with the team, Kell won the 24 Hours of Spa in the Silver class, helping him end the year fifth in the class standings. Towards the end of the year, Kell raced in the last three rounds of the International GT Open for McLaren-fielding Greystone GT, during which he won the finale at Monza to end the year 12th in points. At the end of the year, Kell raced in the GT class of the 2024–25 Asian Le Mans Series for Porsche-affiliated Car Collection Motorsport.

Continuing in the GT World Challenge Europe Endurance Cup for the following year, Kell returned to McLaren machinery as he switched to CSA Racing. In the five-round series, Kell won in class at Le Castellet and took two more podiums to secure a third-place points finish in the Gold Cup standings. In parallel, Kell also raced for Greystone GT in International GT Open, winning at Algarve and Red Bull Ring, as well as taking three more podiums en route to a sixth-place points finish.

Kell returned to CSA Racing for 2026 for a dual campaign in both the GT World Challenge Europe Endurance and Sprint Cups, as well as racing in International GT Open for Track Focused alongside his father Darren as a new member of the McLaren GT3 Junior Driver Programme. In the Endurance Cup, Kell took a lone Gold cup podium at Le Castellet to take fourth in points, whereas in the Sprint Cup, he took a lone class win at Magny-Cours to take seventh among the Gold entrants in points. In GT Open, Kell took Pro-Am podiums in both Hockenheimring races en route to 11th in the class standings.

== Racing record ==
=== Racing career summary ===
Season	Series	Team	Races	Wins	Poles	F/Laps	Podiums	Points	Position
2018	BRSCC MX-5 SuperCup		19	0	0	0	0	946	21st
2019	Ginetta GT4 Supercup – Amateur	Rob Boston Racing	23	2	3	1	11	477	**3rd**
2019	750MC Club Enduro – Class C	Sheard Autosport						71	**2nd**
2020	British GT Championship – GT4 Silver	Speedworks Motorsport	9	0	0	0	2	112.5	6th
2020	750MC Club Enduro – Class C	Sheard Autosport						49	**1st**
2021	24H TCE Series – TCX	CWS Engineering	1	0	0	0	1	15	NC
2021	British GT Championship – GT4 Silver	Jenson Team Rocket RJN	8	1	0	0	5	139	**2nd**
2022	British GT Championship – GT3 Silver	Jenson Team Rocket RJN	9	2	0	0	3	153	**2nd**
2022	GT Cup Championship – GTH	Track Focused	19	0	0	0	0	0	NC
2022–23	Middle East Trophy – GT4	Simpson Motorsport	1	0	0	0	1	36	NC
2023	GT World Challenge Europe Endurance Cup	Walkenhorst Motorsport	5	0	0	0	0	0	NC
2023	GT World Challenge Europe Endurance Cup – Bronze	Walkenhorst Motorsport	5	0	0	0	0	13	23rd
2023	British GT Championship – GT3 Silver	Race Lab	9	2	0	0	5	158	**3rd**
2023	Nürburgring Langstrecken-Serie – VT2-FWD	Walkenhorst Motorsport	3	0	0	0	0	0	NC
2023	GT World Challenge Europe Sprint Cup	GSM AB1 GT3 Team	2	0	0	0	0	0	NC
2023	GT World Challenge Europe Sprint Cup – Silver	GSM AB1 GT3 Team	2	0	0	0	0	6.5	18th
2023–24	Middle East Trophy – GT3 Pro-Am	Race Lab	1	0	0	0	0	12	NC
2024	GT World Challenge Europe Endurance Cup	GetSpeed	5	0	0	0	0	0	NC
2024	GT World Challenge Europe Endurance Cup – Silver	GetSpeed	5	1	0	0	1	76	5th
2024	Intercontinental GT Challenge	GetSpeed	1	0	0	0	0	1	25th
2024	GT World Challenge Europe Sprint Cup	Eurodent GSM Team	0	0	0	0	0	0	NC
2024	GT World Challenge Europe Sprint Cup – Silver	Eurodent GSM Team	0	0	0	0	0	0	NC
2024	International GT Open	Greystone GT	5	1	0	0	2	45	12th
2024–25	Asian Le Mans Series – GT	Car Collection Motorsport	6	0	0	0	0	6	22nd
2025	GT World Challenge Europe Endurance Cup	CSA Racing	5	0	0	0	0	9	19th
2025	GT World Challenge Europe Endurance Cup – Gold	CSA Racing	5	1	0	2	3	94	**3rd**
2025	GT World Challenge Europe Sprint Cup	CSA Racing	2	0	0	0	0	0	NC
2025	GT World Challenge Europe Sprint Cup – Gold	CSA Racing	2	0	0	0	0	9	10th
2025	International GT Open	Greystone GT	14	2	1	1	5	97	6th
2026	GT World Challenge Europe Endurance Cup	CSA Racing	5	0	0	0	0	4	30th
2026	GT World Challenge Europe Endurance Cup – Gold	CSA Racing	5	0	0	0	1	72	4th
2026	GT World Challenge Europe Sprint Cup	CSA Racing	10	0	0	0	0	4.5	26th
2026	GT World Challenge Europe Sprint Cup – Gold	CSA Racing	10	1	3	0	2	65.5	7th
2026	International GT Open	Track Focused	10	0	0	0	0	1	43rd
2026	International GT Open – Pro-Am	Track Focused	10	0	1	0	2	25	11th

=== Complete Ginetta GT4 Supercup results ===
(key) (Races in bold indicate pole position) (Races in italics indicate fastest lap)

Year	Team	Class	1	2	3	4	5	6	7	8	9	10	11	12	13	14	15	16	17	18	19	20	21	22	23	DC	Points
2019	Rob Boston Racing	Amateur	BRH; 1; 3	BRH; 2; 15	BRH; 3; 12	DON; 1; 13	DON; 2; 9	DON; 3; 8	**CRO**; **1**; 10	CRO; 2; 10	CRO; 3 Ret	OUL; 1; 14	OUL; 2; 11	THR; 1; 9	THR; 2; 7	THR; 3; 8	SIL; 1; 9	SIL; 2 Ret	SIL; 3; 7	**KNO**; **1** Ret	KNO; 2; 16	**KNO**; **3** Ret	BRH; 1; 10	**BRH**; **2**; 9	BRH; 3; 10	3rd	477

=== Complete British GT Championship results ===
(key) (Races in bold indicate pole position) (Races in italics indicate fastest lap)

Year	Team	Car	Class	1	2	3	4	5	6	7	8	9	DC	Points
2020	Speedworks Motorsport	Toyota GR Supra GT4	GT4 Silver	OUL; 1; 17	OUL; 2 Ret	DON1; 1; 15	DON1; 2; 15	BRH; 16	DON2; 19	SNE; 1; 18	SNE; 2; 18	**SIL**; 27	6th	112.5
2021	Jenson Team Rocket RJN	McLaren 570S GT4	GT4 Silver	BRH; 15	SIL; 22	DON1; 12	SPA	SNE; 1; 10	SNE; 2; 13	OUL; 1; 14	OUL; 2; 10	DON2; Ret	2nd	139
2022	Jenson Team Rocket RJN	McLaren 720S GT3	GT3 Silver	OUL; 1 Ret	OUL; 2; 6	SIL; 11	DON1; 16	SNE; 1; 10	SNE; 2 Ret	SPA; 9	BRH; 8	DON2; 12	2nd	153
2023	Race Lab	McLaren 720S GT3 Evo	GT3 Silver	OUL; 1; 10	OUL; 2; 12	SIL; 31	DON1; 12	SNE; 1; 15	SNE; 2; 13	ALG; 10	BRH; 11	DON2; Ret	3rd	158

=== Complete GT World Challenge results ===
==== GT World Challenge Europe Endurance Cup ====
(Races in bold indicate pole position) (Races in italics indicate fastest lap)

Year	Team	Car	Class	1	2	3	4	5	6	7	Pos.	Points
2023	Walkenhorst Motorsport	BMW M4 GT3	Bronze	MNZ; 22	LEC; Ret	SPA; 6H; 45	SPA; 12H; 31	SPA; 24H; 46†	NÜR; 41	CAT; 30	23rd	13
2024	GetSpeed	Mercedes-AMG GT3 Evo	Silver	LEC; 39	SPA; 6H; 33	SPA; 12H; 14	SPA; 24H; 25	NÜR; 41	MNZ; 35	JED; 30	5th	76
2025	CSA Racing	McLaren 720S GT3 Evo	Gold	LEC; 6	MNZ; Ret	SPA; 6H; 14	SPA; 12H; 13	SPA; 24H; 13	NÜR; 16	CAT; 31	3rd	94
2026	CSA Racing	McLaren 720S GT3 Evo	Gold	LEC; 8	MNZ; 33	SPA; 6H; 21	SPA; 12H; 14	SPA; 24H; 34	NÜR; 27	ALG; 39	4th	72

==== GT World Challenge Europe Sprint Cup ====
(key) (Races in bold indicate pole position) (Races in italics indicate fastest lap)

Year	Team	Car	Class	1	2	3	4	5	6	7	8	9	10	Pos.	Points
2023	GSM AB1 GT3 Team	Lamborghini Huracán GT3 Evo 2	Silver	BRH; 1	BRH; 2	MIS; 1	MIS; 2	HOC; 1	HOC; 2	VAL; 1; 34	VAL; 2; 30	ZAN; 1	ZAN; 2	18th	6.5
2024	Eurodent GSM Team	Lamborghini Huracán GT3 Evo 2	Silver	BRH; 1 WD	BRH; 2 WD	MIS; 1	MIS; 2	HOC; 1	HOC; 2	MAG; 1	MAG; 2	CAT; 1	CAT; 2	NC	0
2025	CSA Racing	McLaren 720S GT3 Evo	Gold	BRH; 1; 20	BRH; 2; 27	ZAN; 1	ZAN; 2	MIS; 1	MIS; 2	MAG; 1	MAG; 2	VAL; 1	VAL; 2	10th	9
2026	CSA Racing	McLaren 720S GT3 Evo	Gold	BRH; 1; 21	BRH; 2; 25	MIS; 1; 18	**MIS**; **2**; 15	MAG; 1; 19	**MAG**; **2**; 6	ZAN; 1; 28	ZAN; 2; 30	CAT; 1; 22	**CAT**; **2**; 37	7th	65.5

=== Complete International GT Open results ===
(key) (Races in bold indicate pole position) (Races in italics indicate fastest lap)

Year	Team	Car	Class	1	2	3	4	5	6	7	8	9	10	11	12	13	14	Pos.	Points
2024	Greystone GT	McLaren 720S GT3 Evo	Pro	ALG; 1	ALG; 2	HOC; 1	HOC; 2	SPA	HUN; 1	HUN; 2	LEC; 1	LEC; 2	RBR; 1; 6	RBR; 2; 3	CAT; 1; 29†	CAT; 2 Ret	MNZ; 1	12th	45
2025	Greystone GT	McLaren 720S GT3 Evo	Pro	ALG; 1; 1	ALG; 2; 6	**SPA**; Ret	HOC; 1 Ret	HOC; 2; 9	HUN; 1; 3	HUN; 2; 5	LEC; 1; 4	LEC; 2; 3	RBR; 1; 17	RBR; 2; 1	CAT; 1; 9	CAT; 2; 2	MNZ; 5	6th	97
2026	Track Focused	McLaren 720S GT3 Evo	Pro-Am	ALG; 1; 6	ALG; 2; 10	SPA; 7	MIS; 1 DNS	MIS; 2 WD	HUN; 1; 7	HUN; 2 Ret	LEC; 1	LEC; 2	HOC; 1; 3	HOC; 2; 3	MNZ; 7	CAT; 1; 10	**CAT**; **2**; 12	11th	25

=== Complete Asian Le Mans Series results ===
(key) (Races in bold indicate pole position) (Races in italics indicate fastest lap)

Year	Team	Class	Car	Engine	1	2	3	4	5	6	Pos.	Points
2024-25	Car Collection Motorsport	GT	Porsche 911 GT3 R (992)	Porsche 4.0 L Flat-6	SEP; 1; 9	SEP; 2; 15	DUB; 1; 12	DUB; 2; 9	ABU; 1; 15	ABU; 2; 16	22nd	6
