= 2020 Porsche Carrera Cup Great Britain =

18th Porsche Carrera Cup Great Britain season

The 2020 Porsche Carrera Cup Great Britain was a multi-event, one-make motor racing championship held across England and Scotland. The championship featured a mix of professional motor racing teams and privately funded drivers, competing in Porsche 991 GT3 Cup cars that conformed to the technical regulations for the championship. It formed part of the extensive program of support categories built up around the BTCC centrepiece. The 2020 season was the 18th Porsche Carrera Cup Great Britain season, commencing on 28 March at Donington Park – on the circuit's Indy configuration – and finishing on 11 October at Brands Hatch, utilising the Grand Prix circuit, after sixteen races at eight meetings. All sixteen of the races will be held in support of the 2020 British Touring Car Championship.

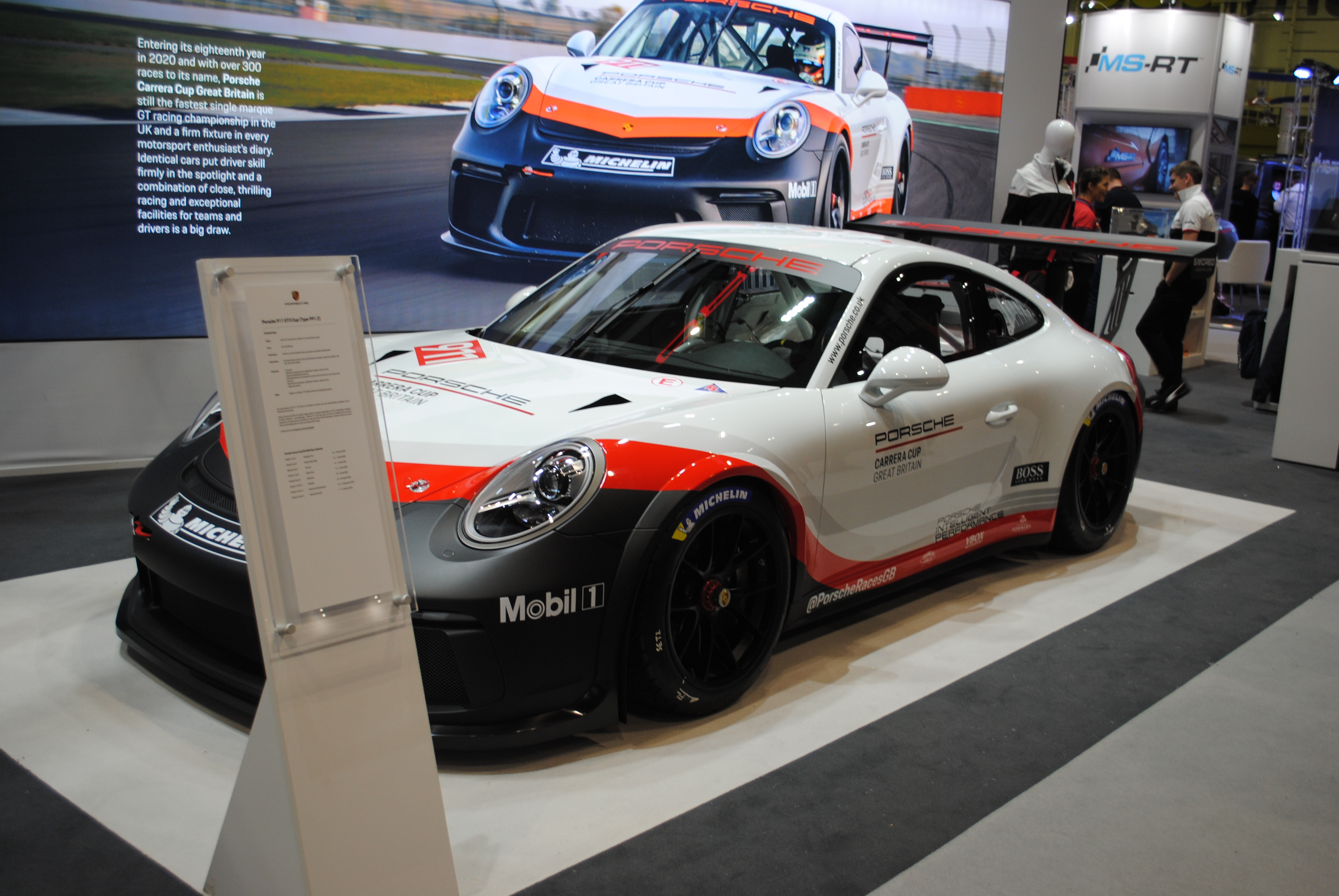
The car used in the championship, the Porsche 991 GT3 Cup.

Harry King was the Pro champion with Team Parker Racing, Esmee Hawkey claimed the Pro-Am title also with Team Parker Racing and Justin Sherwood made it a triple Team Parker win by dominating the Am class.

== Teams and Drivers ==
The following teams and drivers are currently signed to run the 2020 season.

Team	No.	Driver	R	Rounds
Pro Class
Team Parker Racing	4	(United Kingdom) Josh Webster		All
Team Parker Racing	19	(United Kingdom) Harry King	R	All
Brookspeed	5	(United Kingdom) Mark Kimber	R	All
Richardson Racing	10	(United Kingdom) Will Martin	R	All
JTR	23	(United Kingdom) Lorcan Hanafin	R	All
JTR	27	(United Kingdom) Sam MacLeod		All
Redline Racing	44	(Argentina) Dorian Mansilla		1–4, 6
Redline Racing	81	(United Kingdom) Matthew Graham		All
Redline Racing	82	(United Kingdom) Scott McKenna		All
IN2 Racing	59	(United Kingdom) Ross Wylie		All
Pro-Am Class
Brookspeed	2	(United Kingdom) Aaron Mason		All
Team Parker Racing	3	(United Kingdom) Esmee Hawkey		All
Team Parker Racing	33	(United Kingdom) Ryan Ratcliffe	R	All
Redline Racing	30	(United Kingdom) Jake Rattenbury		8
IN2 Racing	88	(United Kingdom) Steve Clark	R	1–2, 6
Am Class
Team Parker Racing	6	(United Kingdom) Justin Armstrong	R	All
Team Parker Racing	7	(United Kingdom) Justin Sherwood		All
Fox Motorsport	11	(United Kingdom) James Townsend	R	1–2, 6–7
Redline Racing	12	(Argentina) Dario Giustozzi	R	6
Redline Racing	15	(United Kingdom) John Ferguson		1–6
Redline Racing	48	(United Kingdom) Jean-Marc Littman		8
Simon Green Motorsport	24	(United Kingdom) Lucky Khera	R	1–3, 5–8
Simon Green Motorsport	98	(United Kingdom) Lee Frost	R	All

Icon	Class
R	Rookie Category

== Race Calendar ==
A new calendar was announced on 26 May 2020.

Round	Circuit	Date	Pole position	Fastest lap	Winning Pro	Winning team	Winning Pro-Am	Winning Am
1	Donington Park (National Circuit, Leicestershire)	1–2 August	(United Kingdom) Harry King	(United Kingdom) Harry King	(United Kingdom) Josh Webster	Team Parker Racing	(United Kingdom) Esmee Hawkey	(United Kingdom) John Ferguson
1	Donington Park (National Circuit, Leicestershire)	1–2 August		(United Kingdom) Lorcan Hanafin	(United Kingdom) Harry King	Team Parker Racing	(United Kingdom) Esmee Hawkey	(United Kingdom) Justin Sherwood
2	Brands Hatch (Grand Prix Circuit, Kent)	8–9 August	(United Kingdom) Harry King	(United Kingdom) Josh Webster	(United Kingdom) Harry King	Team Parker Racing	(United Kingdom) Esmee Hawkey	(United Kingdom) Justin Sherwood
2	Brands Hatch (Grand Prix Circuit, Kent)	8–9 August		(United Kingdom) Harry King	(United Kingdom) Harry King	Team Parker Racing	(United Kingdom) Esmee Hawkey	(United Kingdom) Lee Frost
3	Oulton Park (Island Circuit, Cheshire)	22–23 August	(United Kingdom) Harry King	(United Kingdom) Harry King	(United Kingdom) Harry King	Team Parker Racing	(United Kingdom) Ryan Ratcliffe	(United Kingdom) Justin Sherwood
3	Oulton Park (Island Circuit, Cheshire)	22–23 August		(United Kingdom) Harry King	(United Kingdom) Harry King	Team Parker Racing	(United Kingdom) Ryan Ratcliffe	(United Kingdom) John Ferguson
4	Knockhill Racing Circuit (Fife)	29–30 August	(United Kingdom) Harry King	(United Kingdom) Harry King	(United Kingdom) Matthew Graham	Redline Racing	(United Kingdom) Esmee Hawkey	(United Kingdom) Justin Sherwood
4	Knockhill Racing Circuit (Fife)	29–30 August		(United Kingdom) Harry King	(United Kingdom) Harry King	Team Parker Racing	(United Kingdom) Ryan Ratcliffe	(United Kingdom) Justin Sherwood
5	Thruxton Circuit (Hampshire)	19–20 September	(United Kingdom) Harry King	(United Kingdom) Harry King	(United Kingdom) Will Martin	Richardson Racing	(United Kingdom) Esmee Hawkey	(United Kingdom) John Ferguson
5	Thruxton Circuit (Hampshire)	19–20 September		(United Kingdom) Harry King	(United Kingdom) Ross Wylie	IN2 Racing	(United Kingdom) Esmee Hawkey	(United Kingdom) John Ferguson
6	Silverstone Circuit (National Circuit, Northamptonshire)	26–27 September	(United Kingdom) Harry King	(United Kingdom) Harry King	(United Kingdom) Harry King	Team Parker Racing	(United Kingdom) Esmee Hawkey	(United Kingdom) Justin Sherwood
6	Silverstone Circuit (National Circuit, Northamptonshire)	26–27 September		(United Kingdom) Harry King	(United Kingdom) Harry King	Team Parker Racing	(United Kingdom) Esmee Hawkey	(United Kingdom) Justin Sherwood
7	Snetterton Circuit (300 Circuit, Norfolk)	24–25 October	(United Kingdom) Harry King	(United Kingdom) Harry King	(United Kingdom) Harry King	Team Parker Racing	(United Kingdom) Ryan Ratcliffe	(United Kingdom) Justin Sherwood
7	Snetterton Circuit (300 Circuit, Norfolk)	24–25 October		(United Kingdom) Harry King	(United Kingdom) Harry King	Team Parker Racing	(United Kingdom) Ryan Ratcliffe	(United Kingdom) Justin Sherwood
8	Brands Hatch (Indy Circuit, Kent)	14–15 November	(United Kingdom) Scott McKenna	(United Kingdom) Harry King	(United Kingdom) Harry King	Team Parker Racing	(United Kingdom) Ryan Ratcliffe	(United Kingdom) Lucky Khera
8	Brands Hatch (Indy Circuit, Kent)	14–15 November		(United Kingdom) Lorcan Hanafin	(United Kingdom) Harry King	Team Parker Racing	(United Kingdom) Aaron Mason	(United Kingdom) Justin Sherwood

== Championship standings ==
Points system
	1st	2nd	3rd	4th	5th	6th	7th	8th	PP	FL
Race 1 (Pro)	12	10	8	6	4	3	2	1	2	1
Race 2 (All Classes)	10	8	6	5	4	3	2	1	0	1

=== Drivers' championships ===
Pos	Driver	DON		BHGP		OUL		KNO		THR		SILN		SNE		BHI		Pts
Pro Class
1	(United Kingdom) Harry King	2	1	1	1	1	1	Ret	1	Ret	Ret	1	1	1	1	1	1	167
2	(United Kingdom) Josh Webster	1	3	2	2	2	2	2	3	2	11	9	4	2	2	3	4	121
3	(United Kingdom) Matthew Graham	6	4	4	4	4	4	1	4	Ret	12	5	2	3	3	15	6	80
4	(United Kingdom) Lorcan Hanafin	5	10	3	5	3	6	Ret	6	3	2	4	5	5	4	Ret	Ret	70
5	(United Kingdom) Will Martin	Ret	8	9	Ret	8	8	6	8	1	3	2	3	4	6	2	2	69
6	(United Kingdom) Scott McKenna	4	2	13	7	6	3	5	2	5	Ret	6	7	8	5	16	7	60
7	(United Kingdom) Ross Wylie	7	6	6	DSQ	7	5	3	5	4	1	8	9	11	10	6	5	48
8	(United Kingdom) Sam MacLeod	8	5	14	8	5	Ret	7	7	Ret	8	3	8	6	7	5	Ret	31
9	(United Kingdom) Mark Kimber	10	9	5	Ret	9	7	Ret	9	6	Ret	7	6	7	8	4	3	28
10	(Argentina) Dorian Mansilla	9	11	11	9	11	9	4	12			11	13					7
Pro-Am Class
1	(United Kingdom) Esmee Hawkey	3	7	7	3	12	Ret	8	16	7	4	10	10	10	14	8	9	156
2	(United Kingdom) Ryan Ratcliffe	12	12	(12)	6	10	10	9	10	13	7	12	11	9	9	7	13	136
3	(United Kingdom) Aaron Mason	16	13	10	10	Ret	11	10	13	Ret	10	14	Ret	12	11	9	8	91
4	(United Kingdom) Steve Clark	Ret	17	15	11							17	17					26
	(United Kingdom) Jake Rattenbury*															Ret	11	
Am Class
1	(United Kingdom) Justin Sherwood	13	14	8	13	13	(15)	11	11	9	6	13	12	13	12	12	10	158
2	(United Kingdom) Lee Frost	14	16	17	12	14	13	14	14	10	9	16	15	Ret	16	14	14	97
3	(United Kingdom) Justin Armstrong	15	20	Ret	14	16	14	12	15	12	Ret	20	14	14	13	11	12	92
4	(United Kingdom) Lucky Khera	18	15	Ret	Ret	15	16			11	DNS	15	16	Ret	15	10	Ret	58
5	(United Kingdom) John Ferguson	11	18	DSQ	Ret	17	12	13	Ret	8	5	DSQ	EX					47
6	(United Kingdom) James Townsend	17	19	16	Ret							19	18	15	17			35
	(United Kingdom) Jean-Marc Littman*															13	15	
	(Argentina) Dario Giustozzi*											18	19					
Pos	Driver	DON		BHGP		OUL		KNO		THR		SILN		SNE		BHI		Pts

* Guest entry - not eligible for points
