= 2019 Ginetta GT4 Supercup =

The 2019 Millers Oils Ginetta GT4 Supercup is a multi-event, one make GT motor racing championship held across England and Scotland. The championship features a mix of professional motor racing teams and privately funded drivers, competing in Ginetta G55s that conform to the technical regulations for the championship. It forms part of the extensive program of support categories built up around the BTCC centrepiece. It is the ninth Ginetta GT4 Supercup, having rebranded from the Ginetta G50 Cup, which ran between 2008 and 2010. The season commenced on 1 April at Brands Hatch – on the circuit's Indy configuration – and concludes on 30 September at the same venue, utilising the Grand Prix circuit, after twenty-two races held at eight meetings, all in support of the 2019 British Touring Car Championship.

== Teams and drivers ==
Team	No.	Drivers	Rounds
Professional
Elite Motorsport	12	(United Kingdom) Reece Somerfield	5-8
Elite Motorsport	19	(United Kingdom) Harry King	All
Elite Motorsport	27	(United Kingdom) Tom Emson	7-8
Privateers	12	(United Kingdom) Reece Somerfield	1–4
Privateers	76	(United Kingdom) Carlito Miracco	2–8
Rob Boston Racing	14	(United Kingdom) Will Burns	All
Rob Boston Racing	42	(United Kingdom) Simon Rudd	1, 3–4, 7-8
Rob Boston Racing	44	(United Kingdom) Finley Green	7-8
Rob Boston Racing	66	(United Kingdom) Rob Boston	6
Team HARD	21	(United Kingdom) Sam Randon	6, 8
Team HARD	37	(United Kingdom) Michael Epps	1–5
Team HARD	47	(United Kingdom) Tom Barley	1, 3–4, 7
Team HARD	79	(Wales) Kristian Prosser	7-8
Total Control Racing	44	(United Kingdom) Finley Green	1–6
Declan Jones Racing	69	(United Kingdom) Declan Jones	4
Triple M Motorsport	81	(United Kingdom) Tom Hibbert	All
AK Motorsport	90	(United Kingdom) Alan Henderson	7
AK Motorsport	90	(United Kingdom) James Blake-Baldwin	8
AK Motorsport	99	(United Kingdom) Carl Shield	1–2
Amateur
AK Motorsport	4	(United Kingdom) Carl Garnett	2–5, 7-8
HHC Motorsport	5	(United Kingdom) Chris Ingram	2, 4, 8
Rob Boston Racing	6	(United Kingdom) Dan Kirby	1–3, 6
Rob Boston Racing	33	(United Kingdom) James Kell	All
Assetto Motorsport	7	(United Kingdom) Mike West	7
Team HARD	11	(United Kingdom) Darron Lewis	1–4, 6, 8
Team HARD	15	(United Kingdom) Paul Taylor	1–2
Elite Motorsport	18	(United Kingdom) Jamie Hopkins	5, 7
Privateers	22	(United Kingdom) Adam Lucas	7-8
Declan Jones Racing	24	(United Kingdom) Lucky Khera	1–4
Declan Jones Racing	98	(United Kingdom) Lee Frost	1–4
ES Motorsports	46	(United Kingdom) Jason McInulty	5
Century Motorsport	50	(United Kingdom) Nathan Heathcote	All
Century Motorsport	58	(United Kingdom) Peter Bassill	1–4, 7-8
Century Motorsport	68	(United Kingdom) Jack Oliphant	All
CWS Racing	78	(United Kingdom) Colin White	All

== Race Calendar ==
Round	Circuit	Date	Pole position	Fastest lap	Winning driver	Winning team	Winning Am Driver
1	Brands Hatch (Indy Circuit, Kent)	6 April	(United Kingdom) Harry King	(United Kingdom) Darron Lewis	(United Kingdom) Reece Somerfield	Privateer	(United Kingdom) Darron Lewis
1	Brands Hatch (Indy Circuit, Kent)	6 April		(United Kingdom) Harry King	(United Kingdom) Harry King	Elite Motorsport	(United Kingdom) Nathan Heathcote
1	Brands Hatch (Indy Circuit, Kent)	7 April		(United Kingdom) Will Burns	(United Kingdom) Will Burns	Rob Boston Racing	(United Kingdom) Nathan Heathcote
2	Donington Park (National Circuit, Leicestershire)	27 April	(United Kingdom) Will Burns	(United Kingdom) Will Burns	(United Kingdom) Harry King	Elite Motorsport	(United Kingdom) Dan Kirby
2	Donington Park (National Circuit, Leicestershire)	27 April		(United Kingdom) Will Burns	(United Kingdom) Will Burns	Rob Boston Racing	(United Kingdom) Colin White
2	Donington Park (National Circuit, Leicestershire)	28 April		(United Kingdom) Harry King	(United Kingdom) Tom Hibbert	Triple M Motorsport	(United Kingdom) Darron Lewis
3	Croft Circuit (North Yorkshire)	15 June	(United Kingdom) Tom Hibbert	(United Kingdom) Harry King	(United Kingdom) Harry King	Elite Motorsport	(United Kingdom) Nathan Heathcote
3	Croft Circuit (North Yorkshire)	16 June		(United Kingdom) Harry King	(United Kingdom) Tom Hibbert	Triple M Motorsport	(United Kingdom) Colin White
3	Croft Circuit (North Yorkshire)	16 June		(United Kingdom) Tom Hibbert	(United Kingdom) Harry King	Elite Motorsport	(United Kingdom) Colin White
4	Oulton Park (Island Circuit, Cheshire)	29 June	(United Kingdom) Tom Hibbert	(United Kingdom) Will Burns	(United Kingdom) Tom Hibbert	Triple M Motorsport	(United Kingdom) Nathan Heathcote
4	Oulton Park (Island Circuit, Cheshire)	30 June		(United Kingdom) Harry King	(United Kingdom) Harry King	Elite Motorsport	(United Kingdom) Colin White
5	Thruxton Circuit (Hampshire)	17 August	(United Kingdom) Harry King	(United Kingdom) Will Burns	(United Kingdom) Will Burns	Rob Boston Racing	(United Kingdom) Nathan Heathcote
5	Thruxton Circuit (Hampshire)	18 August		(United Kingdom) Tom Hibbert	(United Kingdom) Will Burns	Rob Boston Racing	(United Kingdom) Colin White
5	Thruxton Circuit (Hampshire)	18 August		(United Kingdom) Carlito Miracco	(United Kingdom) Harry King	Elite Motorsport	(United Kingdom) Nathan Heathcote
6	Knockhill Racing Circuit (Fife)	14 September	(United Kingdom) Harry King	(United Kingdom) Harry King	(United Kingdom) Harry King	Elite Motorsport	(United Kingdom) Colin White
6	Knockhill Racing Circuit (Fife)	15 September		(United Kingdom) Harry King	(United Kingdom) Will Burns	Rob Boston Racing	(United Kingdom) Colin White
6	Knockhill Racing Circuit (Fife)	15 September		(United Kingdom) Rob Boston	(United Kingdom) Rob Boston	Rob Boston Racing	(United Kingdom) James Kell
7	Silverstone Circuit (National Circuit, Northamptonshire)	28 September	(United Kingdom) Harry King	(United Kingdom) Tom Hibbert	(United Kingdom) Harry King	Elite Motorsport	(United Kingdom) Jack Oliphant
7	Silverstone Circuit (National Circuit, Northamptonshire)	28 September		(United Kingdom) Harry King	(United Kingdom) Harry King	Elite Motorsport	(United Kingdom) Nathan Heathcote
7	Silverstone Circuit (National Circuit, Northamptonshire)	29 September		(United Kingdom) Will Burns	(United Kingdom) Tom Hibbert	Triple M Motorsport	(United Kingdom) Jack Oliphant
8	Brands Hatch (Grand Prix Circuit, Kent)	12 October	(United Kingdom) Will Burns	(United Kingdom) Harry King	(United Kingdom) Harry King	Elite Motorsport	(United Kingdom) James Kell
8	Brands Hatch (Grand Prix Circuit, Kent)	13 October		(United Kingdom) Harry King	(United Kingdom) Harry King	Elite Motorsport	(United Kingdom) Darron Lewis
8	Brands Hatch (Grand Prix Circuit, Kent)	13 October		(United Kingdom) Will Burns	(United Kingdom) Tom Hibbert	Triple M Motorsport	(United Kingdom) Nathan Heathcote

== Championship standings ==
Points system
1st	2nd	3rd	4th	5th	6th	7th	8th	9th	10th	11th	12th	13th	14th	15th	16th	17th	18th	19th	20th	R1 PP	FL
35	30	26	22	20	18	16	14	12	11	10	9	8	7	6	5	4	3	2	1	1	1

Notes

- A driver's best 22 scores counted towards the championship, with any other points being discarded.

=== Drivers' championships ===
Pos	Driver	BHI			DON			CRO			OUL		THR			KNO			SIL			BHGP			Points
Professional
1	(United Kingdom) Harry King	7	1	2	1	Ret	4	1	4	1	2	1	Ret	Ret	1	1	9	4	1	1	2	1	1	3	627
2	(United Kingdom) Will Burns	Ret	5	1	3	1	6	4	2	14	3	2	1	1	3	2	1	3	17	2	3	2	2	2	614
3	(United Kingdom) Tom Hibbert	8	4	Ret	9	3	1	2	1	5	1	Ret	2	2	5	3	3	5	7	3	1	4	3	1	560
4	(United Kingdom) Reece Somerfield	1	2	3	2	12	2	8	Ret	Ret	6	3	3	6	9	7	Ret	DNS	4	4	4	5	Ret	5	422
5	(United Kingdom) Carlito Miracco				Ret	8	10	3	5	4	Ret	5	4	5	2	5	4	2	3	6	8	3	17	Ret	369
6	(United Kingdom) Simon Rudd	12	10	9				17	6	3	7	7							2	8	7	6	4	4	266
7	(United Kingdom) Michael Epps	9	3	4	Ret	2	3	9	3	2	5	Ret	5	Ret	4										262
8	(United Kingdom) Finley Green	Ret	7	5	Ret	Ret	Ret	Ret	9	Ret	9	DNS	6	3	Ret	6	5	6	6	7	6	8	6	Ret	235
9	(United Kingdom) Tom Barley	14	Ret	Ret				14	14	Ret	16	10							11	15	14				108
10	(United Kingdom) Rob Boston															4	2	1							88
11	(United Kingdom) Carl Shield	Ret	6	13	4	Ret	7																		74
12	(United Kingdom) Sam Randon															10	7	9				9	8	Ret	70
13	(United Kingdom) Alan Henderson																		5	5	5				60
14	(United Kingdom) Tom Emson																		9	9	Ret	Ret	11	7	56
15	(United Kingdom) James Blake-Baldwin																					7	5	9	52
16	(United Kingdom) Kristian Prosser																		8	14	13	11	Ret	Ret	48
17	(United Kingdom) Declan Jones										4	4													44
18	(United Kingdom) Alex Sedgewick																		DNS	DNS	DNS				0
Amateur
1	(United Kingdom) Nathan Heathcote	15	8	6	7	11	Ret	5	8	8	8	9	7	8	6	12	11	Ret	12	10	11	Ret	13	6	564
2	(United Kingdom) Colin White	13	Ret	7	Ret	4	Ret	7	7	6	10	6	8	4	7	8	6	9	13	11	10	Ret	12	11	557
3	(United Kingdom) James Kell	3	15	12	13	9	8	10	10	Ret	14	11	9	7	8	9	Ret	7	Ret	16	Ret	10	9	10	477
4	(United Kingdom) Jack Oliphant	16	11	Ret	10	6	9	15	Ret	12	13	12	10	9	11	11	8	8	10	13	9	Ret	18	13	453
5	(United Kingdom) Carl Garnett	Ret	16	11	8	13	12	12	12	7	12	15	13	10	13				15	12	11	14	10	12	387
6	(United Kingdom) Darron Lewis	2	18	8	Ret	5	5	6	Ret	11	11	8				Ret	10	Ret				Ret	7	8	330
7	(United Kingdom) Peter Bassill	10	17	16	Ret	15	14	16	16	15	18	17							18	18	18	15	15	15	226
8	(United Kingdom) Lucky Khera	6	12	10	11	14	11	13	13	9	19	14													199
9	(United Kingdom) Dan Kirby	11	9	Ret	5	7	Ret	11	11	10						Ret	Ret	11							188
10	(United Kingdom) Lee Frost	4	14	15	Ret	Ret	13	Ret	15	13	15	13													140
11	(United Kingdom) Chris Ingram				12	10	Ret				17	16										12	16	14	120
12	(United Kingdom) Paul Taylor	5	13	14	6	Ret	Ret																		88
13	(United Kingdom) Jamie Hopkins												12	Ret	12				16	17	17				88
14	(United Kingdom) Adam Lucas																		14	Ret	16	13	14	DNS	84
15	(United Kingdom) Mike West																		19	19	15				48
16	(United Kingdom) Jason McInulty												11	Ret	10										42
Pos	Driver	BHI			DON			CRO			OUL		THR			KNO			SIL			BHGP			Points
