= Harry King (racing driver) =

British racing driver

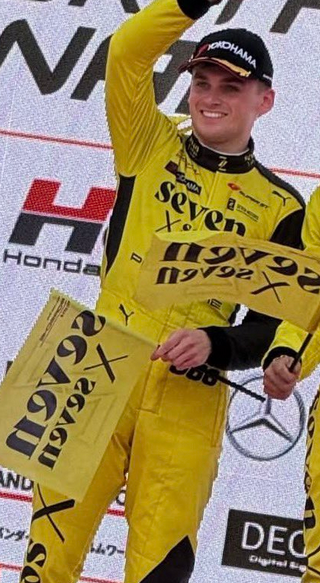
- King in 2025
- Nationality: (United Kingdom) British
- Born: Harry Thomas George King; 20 January 2001 (age 25) Maidenhead, England

Porsche Carrera Cup Great Britain career
- Debut season: 2020
- Current team: Team Parker Racing
- Categorisation: FIA Gold
- Car number: 19
- Starts: 24
- Wins: 13
- Podiums: 18
- Poles: 7
- Fastest laps: 13
- Best finish: 1st in 2020

Previous series
- 2021 2021 2018–2019 2018 2016–2017 2015–2016: Porsche Supercup; Porsche Carrera Cup Benelux; Ginetta GT4 Supercup; Ginetta G40 Cup; Ginetta Junior Championship; Ginetta Junior Winter Series

Championship titles
- 2020 2019 2015: Porsche Carrera Cup Great Britain; Ginetta GT4 Supercup; Ginetta Junior Winter Series Rookie Cup

Awards
- 2020: Autosport National Driver of the Year

Harry Thomas George King (born 20 January 2001) is a British racing driver, who competes in the IMSA SportsCar Championship for AO Racing. King has previously competed in full seasons of the Ginetta Junior Championship and the Ginetta GT4 Supercup, winning the series championship in the latter, in 2019. In 2020, King won twelve out of sixteen races in the Porsche Carrera Cup Great Britain, to take the series title with a round to spare. In 2025, King competed in Super GT in the GT300 class, and won the GT World Challenge Europe Endurance Cup in the Gold class.

== Career ==
=== Karting ===
King made his début in karting in 2012, winning two championships, before competing in the Cadets class of the Super 1 National Kart Championships in 2013. The following season, King won both the National Open – giving him the "O" plate in recognition – and overall championship titles in the F6 Cadets class. In his final season of karting, King competed in the Minimax Rotax Series, and finished second in the Minimax class of the Whilton Mill Kart Club Championships.

=== Ginetta Junior Championship ===
Having finished third in the Ginetta Junior scholarship, King made his car racing début in the 2015 Ginetta Junior Winter Series, competing in the four-race series at Snetterton for Elite Motorsport. He recorded finishes of fourth, sixth, ninth and eleventh – taking three rookie class victories – as he finished in ninth place in the series standings, winning the Rookie Cup in the process.

For the 2016 season, King moved into the main Ginetta Junior Championship, remaining with Elite Motorsport. In the first half of the season, King recorded a fastest lap in the first race at Thruxton, with his best finish to that point – fourth – coming in the second Thruxton race. He recorded two victories during the second half of the season, winning the final race of the Snetterton and Rockingham meetings, ending the season on a run of eight consecutive top-six finishes as he finished eighth in the overall championship and third in the Rookie Cup. He finished sixth in the following Winter Series, recording two fastest laps in the four-race Brands Hatch meeting.

Remaining with Elite Motorsport into the 2017 season, King started the season with a second-place finish in the opening race at Brands Hatch. Over the next seven meetings, King finished on the podium twice – a third-place finish at Thruxton, before his only win of the season at Knockhill – but his form improved as he finished the season with six consecutive podiums at Silverstone and Brands Hatch, as he improved to sixth in the final championship standings.

=== Ginetta GT4 Supercup ===
Although still eligible to continue in the Junior championship, King graduated into the Ginetta GT4 Supercup for the 2018 season, while also continuing his partnership with Elite Motorsport – their first season in the GT4 Supercup. King recorded two third-place finishes at the opening round at Brands Hatch, and recorded his first pole position, fastest lap and victory in the championship over the course of the following meeting at Donington Park. He added three further victories during the season – two at Snetterton, and one at Rockingham – and finished no lower than sixth during the final four meetings, as he finished third in the Pro championship, behind Charlie Ladell and Carl Boardley. King also made a one-off appearance in the Ginetta G40 Cup as a guest driver, where he won all three races at Brands Hatch.

King remained in the series for a second season in 2019, again with Elite Motorsport. King won at least one race at each of the season's eight meetings, as he won eleven races in total – more than double the tally of the next most successful drivers – en route to the championship title by thirteen points ahead of Will Burns.

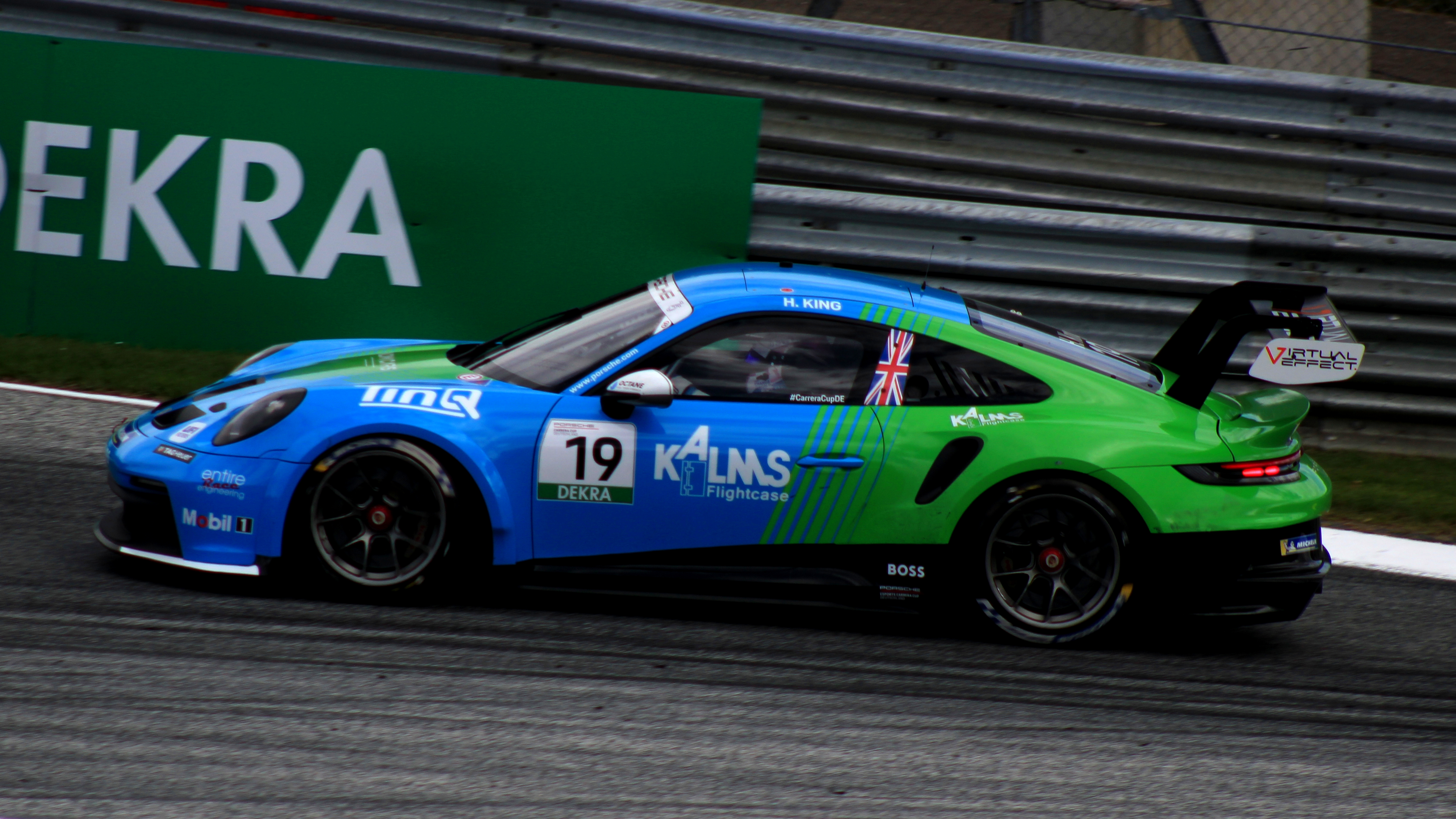
King during the 2023 Porsche Carrera Cup Germany round at the Red Bull Ring.

=== Porsche Carrera Cup Great Britain ===
In November 2019, King was announced as the Porsche Carrera Cup GB Junior driver for the 2020 and 2021 seasons, and he signed a contract with Team Parker Racing in February 2020. The championship start was delayed from the end of March to the start of August due to the COVID-19 pandemic in the United Kingdom; at the season-opening meeting at Donington Park, King took pole position by two tenths of a second, and was leading the opening race of the weekend before clipping a tyre wall at the final chicane. The resulting damage from this hit slowed King's car, and as a result, he lost the race lead to teammate Josh Webster, but maintained second place until the end of the race. In the second race – with a partially-reversed grid – King started third but led by the end of the first lap, and ultimately went on to claim his first win in the series. King swept the races at Brands Hatch and Oulton Park, before his five-race win streak was ended at Knockhill, after he was forced to retire with a coolant leak. In the second race, King started from tenth on the grid but made his way through the order, passing erstwhile race leader Scott McKenna on the final lap to take the victory. King retired from the lead in both races at Thruxton due to punctures, but then won the last six races of the season – wrapping up the championship title with a round to spare.

During the sixteen-race 2020 season, King took seven pole positions from eight qualifying sessions, twelve wins, twelve fastest laps and thirteen podium finishes. For his performances, King was recognised as the National Driver of the Year by Autosport magazine in December 2020, the first time a Porsche Carrera Cup Great Britain driver had won the honour.

=== Porsche Supercup ===
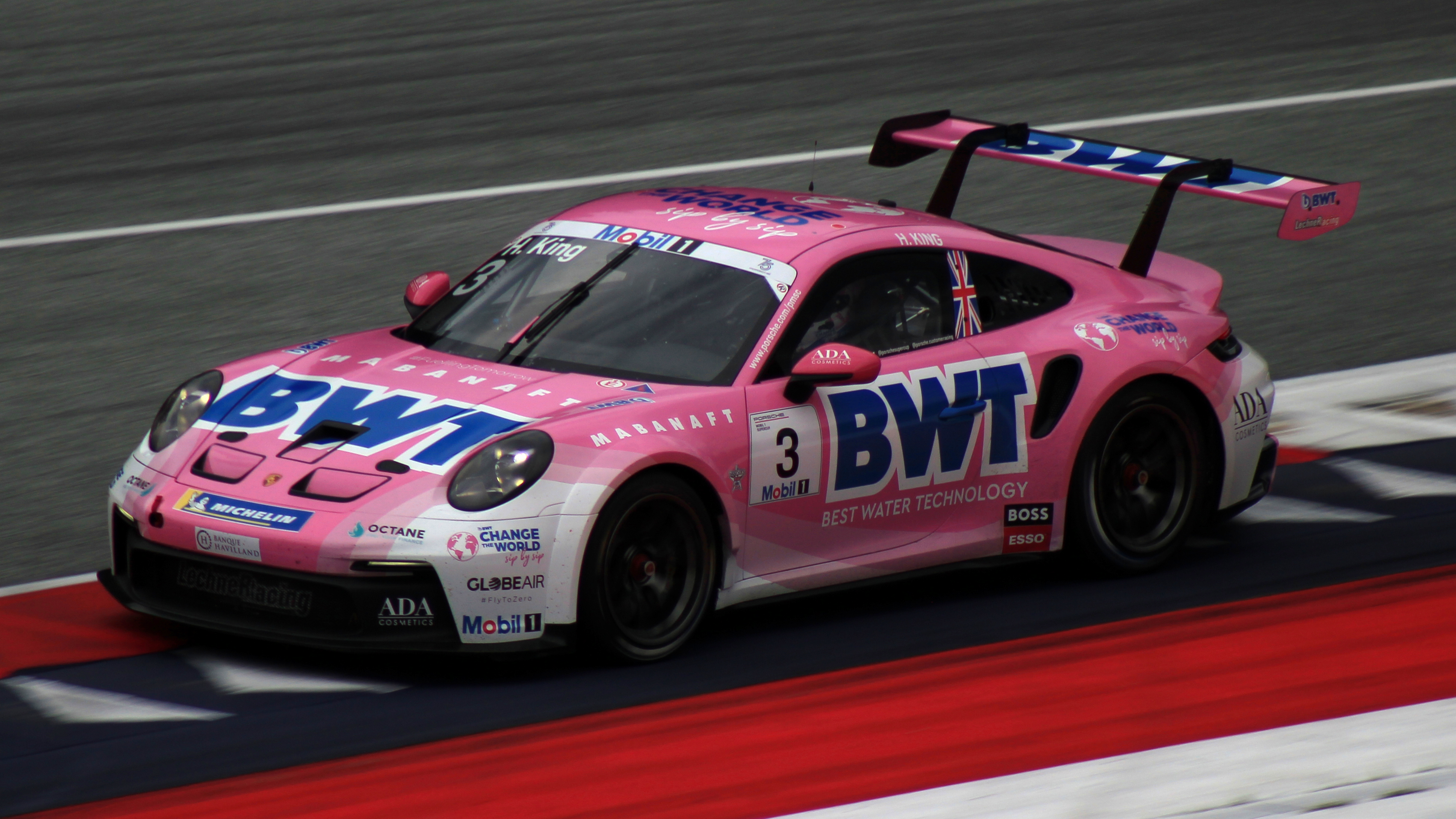
King driving at the Red Bull Ring during the 2023 Porsche Supercup.

In April 2021, it was announced that King was to combine his title defence in the Porsche Carrera Cup Great Britain with a Porsche Supercup campaign, both with Team Parker Racing. King made his debut in the new 992-spec car on a one-off outing in the Porsche Carrera Cup Benelux and took a pair of wins at the Red Bull Ring before his Supercup debut. He recorded a top-ten finish in his first race, in support of the Monaco Grand Prix, finishing ninth.

== Racing record ==
=== Career summary ===
Season	Series	Team	Races	Wins	Poles	FLaps	Podiums	Points	Position
2015	Ginetta Junior Winter Series	Elite Motorsport	4	0	0	0	0	62	9th
2016	Ginetta Junior Championship	Elite Motorsport	25	2	0	1	5	374	8th
2016	Ginetta Junior Winter Series	Elite Motorsport	4	0	0	2	0	60	6th
2017	Ginetta Junior Championship	Elite Motorsport	26	1	1	2	9	508	6th
2018	Ginetta GT4 Supercup	Elite Motorsport	23	4	2	3	13	518	**3rd**
2018	Ginetta G40 Cup	Elite Motorsport	3	3	1	3	3	N/A	NC†
2019	Ginetta GT4 Supercup	Elite Motorsport	23	11	4	9	16	627	**1st**
2020	Porsche Carrera Cup GB	Team Parker Racing	16	12	7	12	13	167	**1st**
2021	Porsche Supercup	Team Parker Racing	6	0	0	0	0	30	14th
2021	Porsche Carrera Cup GB	Team Parker Racing	16	3	2	3	5	94	4th
2021	Porsche Carrera Cup Benelux	Team Parker Racing	2	2	0	2	2	N/A	NC†
2022	Porsche Supercup	BWT Lechner Racing	8	0	0	2	4	109	5th
2022	Porsche Carrera Cup Benelux	Parker Revs Motorsport	10	9	9	10	9	255	**1st**
2022–23	Porsche Sprint Challenge Middle East	Pure Rxcing	6	6	?	4	6	210	6th
2022–23	Middle East Trophy - GT3	Pure Rxcing	2	1	0	0	1	48	6th
2023	Asian Le Mans Series - GT	Herberth Motorsport	4	0	0	0	1	31	4th
2023	Porsche Supercup	BWT Lechner Racing	8	3	2	1	3	108	**3rd**
2023	Porsche Carrera Cup Germany	Allied-Racing	16	1	1	2	8	219	4th
2023	Porsche Carrera Cup Australia	EMA Motorsport	3	3	0	1	3	180	20th
2023–24	Porsche Carrera Cup Middle East	BWT Junior Racing	4	3	2	3	4	95	7th
2024	Porsche Supercup	BWT Lechner Racing	8	1	1	0	6	145	**2nd**
2024	Porsche Carrera Cup Germany	Allied-Racing	16	4	0	3	8	250	**2nd**
2024	Intercontinental GT Challenge	The Bend Manthey EMA	1	0	0	0	0	4	22nd
2024–25	Asian Le Mans Series - LMP2	Pure Rxcing	6	0	0	3	1	37	7th
2025	Super GT - GT300	Seven x Seven Racing	6	1	0	0	3	71.5	9th
2025	GT World Challenge Europe Endurance Cup	Verstappen.com Racing	5	0	0	0	0	8	21st
2025	GT World Challenge Europe Endurance Cup - Gold	Verstappen.com Racing	5	1	0	1	5	121	**1st**
2025	GT World Challenge Asia	Absolute Racing	2	0	0	0	0	0	NC
2025	Middle East Trophy - GT3	Pure Rxcing	1	0	1	0	1	N/A	NC††
2025	Intercontinental GT Challenge	EBM GIGA Racing	1	0	0	0	0	0	NC
2025	992 Endurance Cup	Team Parker Racing	1	0	1	0	0	N/A	7th
2025–26	Asian Le Mans Series - GT	Proton Competition	6	0	0	0	0	8	21st
2025–26	24H Series Middle East - GT3	EBM							
2026	IMSA SportsCar Championship - GTD Pro	AO Racing	10	0	1	1	5	2921	4th
2026	IMSA SportsCar Championship - GTD	AO Racing	1	0	0	0	0	202	73rd
2026	Nürburgring Langstrecken-Serie - VT2-RWD	Adrenalin Motorsport							
2026	Nürburgring Langstrecken-Serie - BMW M240i	Adrenalin Motorsport Team Mainhattan Wheels							
2026	24 Hours of Nürburgring - SP9 Pro-Am	High Class Racing	1	0	0	0	0	N/A	6th
2026	European Le Mans Series - LMGT3	Proton Competition	4	0	0	1	2	44	8th
2026	24 Hours of Le Mans - LMP2	Proton Competition	1	0	0	0	0	N/A	8th
2026	Italian GT Championship Sprint Cup - GT3	Bankcy Racing by Herberth	2	0	1	1	0	0	NC††
2026	British GT Championship - GT3	Herberth Motorsport	0	0	0	0	0	0	NC
2026–27	Asian Le Mans Series – GT3	Proton Competition						*	*

^{†} As King was a guest driver, he was ineligible for points. ^{††} As King did not participate in all rounds, he was ineligible for points. ^{*} Season still in progress.

=== Complete Ginetta Junior Championship results ===
(key) (Races in bold indicate pole position) (Races in italics indicate fastest lap)

Year	Team	1	2	3	4	5	6	7	8	9	10	11	12	13	14	15	16	17	18	19	20	21	22	23	24	25	26	DC	Points
2016	Elite Motorsport	BHI; 1; 16	BHI; 2; 14	DON; 1; 12	DON; 2 Ret	DON; 3; 13	THR; 1; 7	THR; 2; 4	OUL; 1; 12	OUL; 2; 8	CRO; 1; 15	CRO; 2; 19	CRO; 3; 15	SNE; 1; 4	SNE; 2; 1	KNO; 1; 14	KNO; 2; 17	KNO; 3; 13	ROC; 1; 6	ROC; 2; 5	ROC; 3; 1	SIL; 1; 6	SIL; 2; 3	SIL; 3; 3	BHGP; 1; 4	BHGP; 2; 2		8th	374
2017	Elite Motorsport	BHI; 1; 2	BHI; 2; 4	DON; 1; 4	DON; 2; 12	DON; 3; 8	THR1; 1; 3	THR1; 2; 5	OUL; 1; 7	OUL; 2 Ret	CRO; 1; 6	CRO; 2; 9	CRO; 3; 6	SNE; 1; 6	SNE; 2; 13	SNE; 3; 6	KNO; 1; 1	KNO; 2; 15	ROC; 1; 6	ROC; 2; 5	ROC; 3; 4	SIL; 1; 3	SIL; 2; 3	SIL; 3; 2	BHGP; 1; 2	**BHGP**; **2**; 3	BHGP; 3; 2	6th	508

=== Complete Ginetta GT4 Supercup results ===
(key) (Races in bold indicate pole position) (Races in italics indicate fastest lap)

Year	Entrant	1	2	3	4	5	6	7	8	9	10	11	12	13	14	15	16	17	18	19	20	21	22	23	DC	Points
2018	Elite Motorsport	BHI; 1; 3	BHI; 1; 3	BHI; 3; 7	**DON**; **1**; 6	DON; 2; 4	DON; 3; 1	OUL; 1 Ret	OUL; 2; 10	CRO; 1; 3	CRO; 2; 14	CRO; 3 DSQ	**SNE**; **1**; 1	**SNE**; **2**; 1	SNE; 3; 6	ROC; 1; 2	ROC; 2; 2	ROC; 3; 1	SIL; 1; 2	SIL; 2; 2	SIL; 3; 4	BHGP; 1; 3	BHGP; 2; 2	BHGP; 3; 5	3rd	518
2019	Elite Motorsport	**BHI**; **1**; 7	BHI; 2; 1	BHI; 3; 2	DON; 1; 1	**DON**; **2** Ret	DON; 3; 4	CRO; 1; 1	**CRO**; **2**; 4	CRO; 3; 1	OUL; 1; 2	OUL; 2; 1	**THR1**; **1** Ret	THR1; 2 Ret	THR1; 3; 1	**KNO**; **1**; 1	**KNO**; **2**; 9	KNO; 3; 4	**SIL**; **1**; 1	**SIL**; **2**; 1	SIL; 3; 2	BHGP; 1; 1	**BHGP**; **2**; 1	BHGP; 3; 3	1st	627

=== Complete Porsche Carrera Cup Great Britain results ===
(key) (Races in bold indicate pole position) (Races in italics indicate fastest lap)

Year	Team	1	2	3	4	5	6	7	8	9	10	11	12	13	14	15	16	Pos.	Points
2020	Team Parker Racing	**DON**; **1**; 2	DON; 2; 1	**BHGP**; **1**; 1	BHGP; 2; 1	**OUL**; **1**; 1	OUL; 2; 1	**KNO**; **1** Ret	KNO; 2; 1	**THR**; **1** Ret	THR; 2 Ret	**SIL**; **1**; 1	SIL; 2; 1	**SNE**; **1**; 1	SNE; 2; 1	BHI; 1; 1	BHI; 2; 1	1st	167
2021	Team Parker Racing	BHI; 1 Ret	BHI; 2; 2	SNE; 1; 2	SNE; 2; 3	OUL; 1; 6	OUL; 2; 4	KNO; 1; 2	KNO; 2; 1	CRO; 1; 12	CRO; 2 Ret	SIL; 1; 1	SIL; 2; 4	**DON**; **1**; 1	DON; 2; 4	**BHGP**; **1**; 6	BHGP; 2; 5	4th	94

=== Complete Porsche Carrera Cup Benelux results ===
(key) (Races in bold indicate pole position) (Races in italics indicate fastest lap)

Year	Team	1	2	3	4	5	6	7	8	9	10	11	12	Pos.	Points
2021	Team Parker Racing	SPA; 1	SPA; 2	RBR; 1; 1	RBR; 2; 1	ZND; 1	ZND; 2	ZOL; 1	ZOL; 2	ASS; 1	ASS; 2	HOC; 1	HOC; 2	NC†	0
2022	Revs Motorsport	**SPA**; **1**; 1	**SPA**; **2**; 1	**ZOL**; **1**; 1	**ZOL**; **2**; 1	**ZND**; **1**; 1	**ZND**; **2**; 5	ASS; 1; 1	**ASS**; **2**; 1	CAT; 1	CAT; 2	**HOC**; **1**; 1	**HOC**; **2**; 1	1st	255

=== Complete Porsche Supercup results ===
(key) (Races in bold indicate pole position; races in italics indicate fastest lap)

Year	Team	1	2	3	4	5	6	7	8	Pos.	Points
2021	Team Parker Racing	MON; 9	RBR	RBR; Ret	HUN	SPA; 17	ZND; 15	MNZ; 9	MNZ; 6	14th	30
2022	BWT Lechner Racing	IMO; 3	MON; 5	SIL; 3	RBR; 4	LEC; 2	SPA; 5	ZND; Ret	MNZ; 3	5th	109
2023	BWT Lechner Racing	MON; 1	RBR; 10	SIL; Ret	**HUN**; 1	SPA; 4	ZND; Ret	ZND; 5	**MNZ**; 1	3rd	108
2024	BWT Lechner Racing	IMO; 2	MON; 2	RBR; 2	SIL; 4	**HUN**; 1	SPA; 3	ZND; 5	MNZ; 3	2nd	145

=== Complete Asian Le Mans Series results ===
(key) (Races in bold indicate pole position) (Races in italics indicate fastest lap)

Year	Team	Class	Car	Engine	1	2	3	4	5	6	Pos.	Points
2023	Herberth Motorsport	GT	Porsche 911 GT3 R	Porsche 4.0 L Flat-6	DUB; 1; 4	DUB; 2; 10	ABU; 1; 2	ABU; 2; 15			4th	31
2024–25	Pure Rxcing	LMP2	Oreca 07	Gibson GK428 4.2 L V8	SEP; 1; 3	SEP; 2; 8	DUB; 1; 8	DUB; 2; 8	ABU; 1; 7	ABU; 2; 8	7th	37
2025–26	Proton Competition	GT	Porsche 911 GT3 R (992)	Porsche 4.2 L Flat-6	SEP; 1; 10	SEP; 2; 15	DUB; 1; 11	DUB; 2; 13	ABU; 1; 13	ABU; 2; 8	21st	8

=== Complete GT World Challenge Europe results ===
==== GT World Challenge Europe Endurance Cup ====
(key) (Races in bold indicate pole position) (Races in italics indicate fastest lap)

Year	Team	Car	Class	1	2	3	4	5	6	7	Pos.	Points
2025	Verstappen.com Racing	Aston Martin Vantage AMR GT3 Evo	Gold	LEC; 9	MNZ; 15	SPA; 6H; 11	SPA; 12H; 10	SPA; 24H; 9	NÜR; 17	CAT; 8	1st	121

=== Complete Super GT results ===
(key) (Races in bold indicate pole position) (Races in italics indicate fastest lap)

Year	Team	Car	Class	1	2	3	4	5	6	7	8	9	DC	Points
2025	Seven x Seven Racing	Porsche 911 GT3 R (992)	GT300	OKA	FUJ; 24	SEP	FS1 (9)	FS2; 8	SUZ; 9	SUG; 3	AUT; 1	MOT; 3	6th	71.5

^{‡} Half points awarded as less than 75% of race distance was completed.
^{(Number)} Driver did not take part in this sprint race, points are still awarded for the teammate's result.

=== Complete IMSA SportsCar Championship results ===
(key) (Races in bold indicate pole position; results in italics indicate fastest lap)

Year	Team	Class	Make	Engine	1	2	3	4	5	6	7	8	9	10	11	Rank	Points
2026	AO Racing	GTD Pro	Porsche 911 GT3 R (992.2)	Porsche 4.2 L Flat-6	DAY; 9	SEB; 2		LGA; 3	DET; 9	WGL; 7	MOS; 2	**ELK**; 2	VIR; 9	IMS; 10	PET; 2	4th	2921
2026	AO Racing	GTD	Porsche 911 GT3 R (992.2)	Porsche 4.2 L Flat-6			LBH; 13									73rd	202

=== Complete European Le Mans Series results ===
(key) (Races in bold indicate pole position; races in italics indicate fastest lap)

Year	Entrant	Class	Chassis	Engine	1	2	3	4	5	6	Rank	Points
2026	Proton Competition	LMGT3	Porsche 911 GT3 R (992.2)	Porsche 4.2 L Flat-6	CAT; 8	LEC	IMO; 3	SPA	SIL; 3	ALG; 5	8th	44

=== Complete 24 Hours of Le Mans results ===
Year	Team	Co-Drivers	Car	Class	Laps	Pos.	Class Pos.
2026	(Germany) Proton Competition	(Japan) Kakunoshin Ohta (Germany) Jonas Ried	Oreca 07-Gibson	LMP2	356	25th	8th

Sporting positions
Preceded by Charlie Ladell	Ginetta GT4 Supercup; Champion; 2019	Succeeded by Will Burns
Preceded by Daniel Harper	Porsche Carrera Cup GB; Champion; 2020	Succeeded by Dan Cammish
Awards and achievements
Preceded by Colin Turkington	Autosport Awards; National Driver of the Year; 2020	Succeeded by Ashley Sutton
