= 2024 TCR UK Touring Car Championship =

Motor racing competition

The 2024 TCR UK Touring Car Championship is the sixth season of the TCR UK Touring Car Championship. The championship features production-based touring cars built to TCR specifications and will be held over twenty races across seven meetings throughout England. The championship is operated by Stewart Lines' Maximum Group in partnership with the British Racing and Sports Car Club.

== Calendar ==
The schedule for 2024 was announced on 24 August 2023 containing 20 races across 7 rounds.

| Rnd. | | Circuit/Location | Date | Map |
|---|---|---|---|---|
| 1 | 1 | Brands Hatch (Indy), Kent | 13–14 April | 2024 TCR UK Touring Car Championship is located in the United Kingdom |
| 1 | 2 | Brands Hatch (Indy), Kent | 13–14 April | 2024 TCR UK Touring Car Championship is located in the United Kingdom |
| 1 | 3 | Brands Hatch (Indy), Kent | 13–14 April | 2024 TCR UK Touring Car Championship is located in the United Kingdom |
| 2 | 4 | Snetterton Circuit (300 Circuit), Norfolk) | 18–19 May | 2024 TCR UK Touring Car Championship is located in the United Kingdom |
| 2 | 5 | Snetterton Circuit (300 Circuit), Norfolk) | 18–19 May | 2024 TCR UK Touring Car Championship is located in the United Kingdom |
| 2 | 6 | Snetterton Circuit (300 Circuit), Norfolk) | 18–19 May | 2024 TCR UK Touring Car Championship is located in the United Kingdom |
| 3 | 7 | Oulton Park (Island), Cheshire | 8 June | 2024 TCR UK Touring Car Championship is located in the United Kingdom |
| 3 | 8 | Oulton Park (Island), Cheshire | 8 June | 2024 TCR UK Touring Car Championship is located in the United Kingdom |
| 4 | 9 | Croft Circuit, North Yorkshire | 13–14 July | 2024 TCR UK Touring Car Championship is located in the United Kingdom |
| 4 | 10 | Croft Circuit, North Yorkshire | 13–14 July | 2024 TCR UK Touring Car Championship is located in the United Kingdom |
| 4 | 11 | Croft Circuit, North Yorkshire | 13–14 July | 2024 TCR UK Touring Car Championship is located in the United Kingdom |
| 5 | 12 | Silverstone Circuit (National), Northamptonshire | 17–18 August | 2024 TCR UK Touring Car Championship is located in the United Kingdom |
| 5 | 13 | Silverstone Circuit (National), Northamptonshire | 17–18 August | 2024 TCR UK Touring Car Championship is located in the United Kingdom |
| 5 | 14 | Silverstone Circuit (National), Northamptonshire | 17–18 August | 2024 TCR UK Touring Car Championship is located in the United Kingdom |
| 6 | 15 | Thruxton Circuit, Hampshire | 21–22 September | 2024 TCR UK Touring Car Championship is located in the United Kingdom |
| 6 | 16 | Thruxton Circuit, Hampshire | 21–22 September | 2024 TCR UK Touring Car Championship is located in the United Kingdom |
| 6 | 17 | Thruxton Circuit, Hampshire | 21–22 September | 2024 TCR UK Touring Car Championship is located in the United Kingdom |
| 7 | 18 | Silverstone Circuit (International), Northamptonshire | 12–13 October | 2024 TCR UK Touring Car Championship is located in the United Kingdom |
| 7 | 19 | Silverstone Circuit (International), Northamptonshire | 12–13 October | 2024 TCR UK Touring Car Championship is located in the United Kingdom |
| 7 | 20 | Silverstone Circuit (International), Northamptonshire | 12–13 October | 2024 TCR UK Touring Car Championship is located in the United Kingdom |

== Teams and drivers ==
| Team | Car | No. | Drivers | Class | Rounds | Ref. |
Gen-2 Entries
| (United Kingdom) CBM with Hart GT | Cupra León Competición TCR | 1 | (United Kingdom) Carl Boardley | | All | |
| (United Kingdom) Go-Fix Honda by Sport77 | Honda Civic Type R TCR (FK8) | 7 | (United Kingdom) Will Powell | | 1, 3, 5 | |
| (United Kingdom) Go-Fix Honda by Sport77 | Honda Civic Type R TCR (FK8) | 28 | (United Kingdom) Bradley Thurston | | 3–5 | |
| (United Kingdom) ARK Motorsports | Hyundai i30 N TCR | 15 | (United Kingdom) Andrew Dyer | | 7 | |
| (United Kingdom) JH Racing | Hyundai i30 N TCR | 16 | (United Kingdom) Callum Newsham | | All | |
| (United Kingdom) JH Racing | Hyundai i30 N TCR | 45 | (United Kingdom) Alistair Camp | | 7 | |
| (United Kingdom) DLR with JH Racing | Hyundai i30 N TCR | 285 | (United Kingdom) Darron Lewis | D | All | |
| (United Kingdom) Bond-It with MPH Racing | Cupra León Competición TCR | 17 | (United Kingdom) Bradley Hutchison | | All | |
| (United Kingdom) Pro Alloys Racing | Lynk & Co 03 TCR | 20 | (Sweden) Viktor Andersson | | 1 | |
| (United Kingdom) Pro Alloys Racing | Lynk & Co 03 TCR | 70 | (United Kingdom) Owen Hillman | | 5 | |
| (United Kingdom) JW Bird Motorsport | Cupra León Competición TCR | 31 | (United Kingdom) Matthew Wilson | | 5, 7 | |
| (United Kingdom) Maximum Motorsport | Hyundai i30 N TCR | 81 | (United Kingdom) Stewart Lines | D | 4–7 | |
| (United Kingdom) Rob Boston Racing | Audi RS 3 LMS TCR (2021) | 99 | (United Kingdom) Joe Marshall | | 1–3 | |
| (United Kingdom) Capture Motorsport | Hyundai i30 N TCR | 100 | (United Kingdom) Steve Laidlaw | D | 2–3 | |
| (United Kingdom) Capture Motorsport | Hyundai i30 N TCR | 101 | (United Kingdom) Sam Laidlaw | | 4–6 | |
| (United Kingdom) Area Motorsport | Cupra León Competición TCR | 100 | (United Kingdom) Steve Laidlaw | D | 4–6 | |
| (United Kingdom) Area Motorsport | Cupra León Competición TCR | 115 | (United Kingdom) Luke Sargeant | | 1–3 | |
| (United Kingdom) Area Motorsport | Cupra León Competición TCR | 117 | (United Kingdom) Adam Shepherd | | All | |
| (United Kingdom) Area Motorsport | Cupra León VZ TCR | 100 | (United Kingdom) Steve Laidlaw | D | 7 | |
| (United Kingdom) Area Motorsport | Cupra León VZ TCR | 101 | (United Kingdom) Sam Laidlaw | | 7 | |
| (United Kingdom) Motion Motorsport | Lynk & Co 03 TCR | 111 | (United Kingdom) Ryan Bensley | D | 7 | |
| (United Kingdom) RS Vehicle Sales | Audi RS 3 LMS TCR (2021) | 115 | (United Kingdom) Luke Sargeant | | 5–7 | |
Gen-1 Entries
| (United Kingdom) SGM with Sport77 | Audi RS 3 LMS TCR (2017) | 12 | (France) Cedric Bloch | | 5, 7 | |
| (United Kingdom) Matrix Motorsport with DW Racing | Audi RS 3 LMS TCR (2017) | 19 | (United Kingdom) Jeffrey Alden | D | 1–3 | |
| (United Kingdom) Matrix Motorsport with DW Racing | Opel Astra TCR | 19 | (United Kingdom) Jeffrey Alden | D | 5 | |
| (United Kingdom) EDF Motorsports | Cupra León TCR | 22 | (United Kingdom) Rick Kerry | D | All | |
| (United Kingdom) Capture Motorsport | Volkswagen Golf GTI TCR | 27 | (United Kingdom) Will Beech | | 1–6 | |
| (United Kingdom) Sport77 | Audi RS 3 LMS TCR (2017) | 28 | (United Kingdom) Bradley Thurston | | 1 | |
| (United Kingdom) DW Racing | Vauxhall Astra TCR | 50 | (United Kingdom) Darelle Wilson | | 1 | |
| (United Kingdom) Richmond Fire Motorsport | Cupra León TCR | 77 | (United Kingdom) Mark Smith | D | 1–4, 6–7 | |
| (United Kingdom) Maximum Motorsport with MPH Racing | Audi RS 3 LMS TCR (2017) | 81 | (United Kingdom) Stewart Lines | D | 3 | |

| Icon | Class |
|---|---|
| D | Eligible for Goodyear Diamond Trophy |

=== Driver and team changes ===
- Pro Alloys Racing entered the series, fielding a Lynk & Co 03 TCR for the first time in the series history on a part time basis.
- Area Motorsport scaled down from 4 Hyundais to a pair of Cupra León Competición TCRs. Adam Shepherd and Luke Sargeant remained with the team, while Bruce Winfield and Alex Ley left the team, with Ley switching to Target Competition in TCR Italy and Winfield unable to secure budget for the season.
- Restart Racing left the series to compete in BTCC, with both drivers Chris Smiley and Scott Sumpton remaining with the team and effectively leaving the series.
- Darron Lewis joined JH Racing and switched from running an Audi RS 3 LMS TCR (2017) to a Hyundai i30 N TCR.
- Capture Motorsport joined the series, with Will Beech and Steve Laidlaw also making their debuts.
- Jac Constable left the series, which left Rob Boston Racing scaling down to just one Audi, still driven by Joe Marshall.
- Will Powell's team Sport77 entered the series, with Powell driving a Honda Civic Type-R TCR (FK8) and Bradley Thurston driving an Audi RS 3 LMS TCR (2017), after missing the second round, Thurston drove a Honda Civic Type-R TCR (FK8) from the third round.

== Championship standings ==
=== Drivers' standings ===
Points system
| Position | **1st** | **2nd** | **3rd** | **4th** | **5th** | **6th** | **7th** | **8th** | **9th** | **10th** | **11th** | **12th** | **13th** | **14th** | **15th** | Fastest lap |
| Qualifying | 6 | 5 | 4 | 3 | 2 | 1 | —N/a | | | | | | | | | |
| Race | 40 | 35 | 30 | 27 | 24 | 21 | 18 | 15 | 13 | 11 | 9 | 7 | 5 | 3 | 1 | 1 |

- Drivers' top 13 results from the 15 races count towards the championship.

| Pos | Driver | BHI | | | SNE | | | OUL | | CRO | | | SIL NAT | | | THR | | | SIL INT | | | Total | Drop | Points |
|---|---|---|---|---|---|---|---|---|---|---|---|---|---|---|---|---|---|---|---|---|---|---|---|---|
| 1 | (United Kingdom) Carl Boardley | 2^{3} | 5 | 2 | 2^{4} | 3 | 4 | 1^{1} | 2^{F} | 3^{3} | 1 | 3 | 1^{2} | 3^{F} | 1^{F} | 3^{3} | 1^{F} | 10^{F} | 4^{6} | 4 | 4 | 665 | 54 | 611 |
| 2 | (United Kingdom) Bradley Hutchison | 13^{5} | 6 | 4 | 3^{5} | 1 | 3 | 3^{6} | Ret | 2^{2} | 2 | 2 | 3^{3} | 1 | 4 | 4^{6} | 2 | 2 | 3^{4} | 2 | 1 | 605 | 14 | 591 |
| 3 | (United Kingdom) Callum Newsham | 4^{1} | 2 | 1^{F} | 4^{3} | 5 | 5 | 12^{2} | 4 | 1^{1F} | 3 | 1^{F} | 2^{5F} | 2 | Ret | 1^{1} | Ret | DNS | 1^{1} | 1^{F} | Ret | 551 | | 551 |
| 4 | (United Kingdom) Darron Lewis | 7 | 9 | 6 | 6 | 6 | 7 | 6^{5} | 3 | 4^{4} | 4 | 5 | 5 | 5 | 2 | 5 | 5 | 3 | 7 | 5 | Ret | 450 | 31 | 419 |
| 5 | (United Kingdom) Adam Shepherd | 3^{F} | 1 | 3 | 1^{1F} | 2 | 1 | 4^{3} | 1 | DNS | 11^{F} | 4 | 14^{1} | 8 | 11 | Ret^{2F} | Ret | Ret | 2^{2F} | Ret | Ret | 411 | | 411 |
| 6 | (United Kingdom) Luke Sargeant | 8^{6} | 7 | 7 | 5^{6} | 7 | 6 | 5 | 5 | | | | 7^{6} | 6 | 5 | Ret | 7 | 6 | 8 | 3 | 3 | 341 | | 341 |
| 7 | (United Kingdom) Steve Laidlaw | | | | 9 | 8 | DSQ | 9 | 6 | 5^{5} | Ret | 6 | 4^{4} | DSQ | 3 | 2^{4} | 3 | 1 | Ret | 6 | 2 | 332 | 12 | 320 |
| 8 | (United Kingdom) Rick Kerry | 10 | 11 | 10 | 7 | 9 | 9 | 8 | 7 | 6 | 9 | 8 | 11 | 9 | 10 | 8 | 6 | 5 | Ret | 11 | DNS | 259 | 18 | 241 |
| 9 | (United Kingdom) Will Beech | 9 | 10 | 9 | 8 | 11 | 8 | 7 | Ret | NC | 8 | 7 | 12 | 12 | 9 | 7 | 8 | 8 | | | | 202 | 9 | 193 |
| 10 | (United Kingdom) Joe Marshall | 5^{4} | 3^{F} | 5 | Ret^{2} | 4^{F} | 2^{F} | 2^{4F} | Ret | | | | | | | | | | | | | 190 | 9 | 181 |
| 11 | (United Kingdom) Stewart Lines | | | | | | | 10 | 8 | 10 | 10 | 9 | 15 | 7 | 7 | 9 | 4 | 7 | 12 | 10 | Ret | 174 | | 174 |
| 12 | (United Kingdom) Sam Laidlaw | | | | | | | | | 7^{6} | 5 | 11 | 9 | Ret | Ret | 6^{5} | DSQ | 4 | 9 | 8 | 6 | 165 | | 165 |
| 13 | (United Kingdom) Mark Smith | 11 | 13 | 11 | 10 | 12 | 11 | 11 | Ret | 8 | 7 | 10 | | | | 10 | 9 | 9 | 14 | 13 | 8 | 163 | | 163 |
| 14 | (United Kingdom) Matthew Wilson | | | | | | | | | | | | 6 | 4 | 6 | | | | 10 | 9 | 7 | 111 | | 111 |
| 15 | (Sweden) Viktor Andersson | 1^{2} | 4 | DSQ | | | | | | | | | | | | | | | | | | 72 | | 72 |
| 16 | (United Kingdom) Alistair Camp | | | | | | | | | | | | | | | | | | 6^{3} | 7 | 5 | 67 | | 67 |
| 17 | (United Kingdom) Bradley Thurston | Ret | Ret | Ret | | | | Ret | 9 | 9 | 6 | Ret | 10 | Ret | DNS | | | | | | | 59 | | 59 |
| 18 | (United Kingdom) Will Powell | 6 | 8 | 8 | | | | 13 | Ret | | | | 16 | Ret | DNS | | | | | | | 56 | | 56 |
| 19 | (United Kingdom) Jeff Alden | 12 | 12 | Ret | 11 | 10 | 10 | Ret | Ret | | | | Ret | 11 | Ret | | | | | | | 54 | | 54 |
| 20 | (United Kingdom) Owen Hillman | | | | | | | | | | | | 8 | 10 | 8 | | | | | | | 41 | | 41 |
| 21 | (France) Cedric Bloch | | | | | | | | | | | | 13 | Ret | Ret | | | | 13 | 12 | 9 | 30 | | 30 |
| 22 | (United Kingdom) Ryan Bensley | | | | | | | | | | | | | | | | | | 5^{5} | Ret | DNS | 26 | | 26 |
| 23 | (United Kingdom) Andrew Dyer | | | | | | | | | | | | | | | | | | 11 | Ret | Ret | 9 | | 9 |
| – | (United Kingdom) Darelle Wilson | DNS | DNS | DNS | | | | | | | | | | | | | | | | | | 0 | | 0 |
| Pos | Driver | BHI | | | SNE | | | OUL | | CRO | | | SIL NAT | | | THR | | | SIL INT | | | Total | Drop | Points |

Key
| Colour | Result |
|---|---|
| Gold | Winner |
| Silver | Second place |
| Bronze | Third place |
| Green | Other points position |
| Blue | Other classified position |
| Blue | Not classified, finished (NC) |
| Purple | Not classified, retired (Ret) |
| Red | Did not qualify (DNQ) |
| Red | Did not pre-qualify (DNPQ) |
| Black | Disqualified (DSQ) |
| White | Did not start (DNS) |
| White | Race cancelled (C) |
| Blank | Did not practice (DNP) |
| Blank | Excluded (EX) |
| Blank | Did not arrive (DNA) |
| Blank | Withdrawn (WD) |
| Blank | Did not enter (cell empty) |
| Text formatting | Meaning |
| **Bold** | Pole position |
| Italics | Fastest lap |

^{1 2 3 4 5 6} – Qualifying position
^{F} – Fastest lap
