= 2026 TCR UK Touring Car Championship =

Motor racing competition

The 2026 TCR UK Touring Car Championship was the eighth season of the TCR UK Touring Car Championship. The championship featured production-based touring cars built to TCR specifications. The championship was operated by Stewart Lines' Maximum Group in partnership with the British Automobile Racing Club.

== Calendar ==
Rnd.		Circuit/Location	Date
1	1	Brands Hatch (Indy Circuit), Kent	4–5 April
1	2	Brands Hatch (Indy Circuit), Kent	4–5 April
1	3	Brands Hatch (Indy Circuit), Kent	4–5 April
2	4	Croft Circuit, North Yorkshire	2–3 May
2	5	Croft Circuit, North Yorkshire	2–3 May
3	6	Snetterton Circuit (300 Circuit), Norfolk	11–12 July
3	7	Snetterton Circuit (300 Circuit), Norfolk	11–12 July
4	8	Donington Park (National Circuit), Leicestershire	8–9 August
4	9	Donington Park (National Circuit), Leicestershire	8–9 August
4	10	Donington Park (National Circuit), Leicestershire	8–9 August
5	11	Donington Park (Grand Prix Circuit), Leicestershire	5–6 September
5	12	Donington Park (Grand Prix Circuit), Leicestershire	5–6 September
6	13	Oulton Park (Island Circuit), Cheshire	3 October
6	14	Oulton Park (Island Circuit), Cheshire	3 October
7	15	Brands Hatch (Indy Circuit), Kent	31 October–1 November
7	16	Brands Hatch (Indy Circuit), Kent	31 October–1 November
7	17	Brands Hatch (Indy Circuit), Kent	31 October–1 November

== Teams and drivers ==
Team	Car	No.	Drivers	Class	Rounds
Gen-2 Entries
(United Kingdom) Vannin Motorsport	Audi RS 3 LMS TCR (2021)	1	(United Kingdom) Adam Shepherd		4–5
(United Kingdom) Vannin Motorsport	Audi RS 3 LMS TCR (2021)	5	(Republic of Ireland) Barry-John McHenry	D	1, 3–6
(United Kingdom) Vannin Motorsport	Audi RS 3 LMS TCR (2021)	52	(Republic of Ireland) Alastair Kellett	D	2
(United Kingdom) Vannin Motorsport	Audi RS 3 LMS TCR (2021)	69	(Republic of Ireland) Max Hart		6
(United Kingdom) Vannin Motorsport	Audi RS 3 LMS TCR (2021)	115	(United Kingdom) Luke Sargeant		5
(United Kingdom) Vannin Motorsport	Audi RS 3 LMS TCR (2021)	185	(United Kingdom) Jenson Mason		1
(United Kingdom) JH Racing	Audi RS 3 LMS TCR (2021)	7	(United Kingdom) Jac Constable		1
(United Kingdom) JH Racing	Audi RS 3 LMS TCR (2021)	72	(United Kingdom) Russell Joyce	D	1–4
(United Kingdom) JH Racing	Hyundai Elantra N TCR (2024)	16	(United Kingdom) Callum Newsham		1–6
(United Kingdom) Power Maxed Racing	Cupra León VZ TCR	8	(Republic of Ireland) Rod McGovern	D	1–6
(United Kingdom) Power Maxed Racing	Honda Civic Type R TCR (FL5)	272	(United Kingdom) Jenson O’Neill-Going		1–6
(United Kingdom) DTR	Honda Civic Type R TCR (FL5)	11	(United Kingdom) Harry Bloor		1–6
(United Kingdom) DTR	Honda Civic Type R TCR (FL5)	41	(United Kingdom) Carl Boardley		1–5
(United Kingdom) Capture Motorsport with MPH	Cupra León VZ TCR	17	(United Kingdom) Brad Hutchison		1–6
(United Kingdom) Capture Motorsport with MPH	Cupra León VZ TCR	77	(United Kingdom) Mark Smith	D	1–6
(United Kingdom) Matrix Motorsport	Hyundai i30 N TCR	19	(United Kingdom) Jeff Alden	D	1
(United Kingdom) EDF Motorsports	Hyundai i30 N TCR	22	(United Kingdom) Rick Kerry	D	1, 3–5
(United Kingdom) SVG Motorsport	Lynk & Co 03 TCR	38	(United Kingdom) Lewis Kent		1–2
(Estonia) ALM Motorsport	Honda Civic Type R TCR (FL5)	69	(Republic of Ireland) Max Hart		1–5
(United Kingdom) Hall's Racing	Honda Civic Type R TCR (FL5)	93	(United Kingdom) Max Hall		1–6
Gen-1 Entries
(United Kingdom) Uncle Luke's Sign & Sticker Shop	Volkswagen Golf GTI TCR	192	(United Kingdom) Luke Allen		1, 3

Icon	Class
D	Eligible for Goodyear Diamond Trophy

== Championship standings ==
Points system
Position	1st	2nd	3rd	4th	5th	6th	7th	8th	9th	10th	11th	12th	13th	14th	15th	Fastest lap
Qualifying	6	5	4	3	2	1	—N/a									
Race	40	35	30	27	24	21	18	15	13	11	9	7	5	3	1	1

=== Drivers' standings ===
Pos	Driver	BHI1			CRO		SNE		DON1			DON2		OUL		BHI2	Total	Drop	Points
1	(Republic of Ireland) Max Hart	Ret^{4}	2	5	3^{6}	4	1^{2}	4	3^{4}	3	5	5^{2}	4	3^{6}	4		394	34	360
2	(United Kingdom) Callum Newsham	Ret^{1}	3	1	1^{1}	9	3^{1}	7	2^{2}	8	12	DSQ^{1}	5	1^{1}	2		366	7	359
3	(United Kingdom) Max Hall	Ret^{2}	6	11	10^{4}	1	4	3	11^{6}	4	2	3^{4}	1	2^{3}	7		352	18	334
4	(United Kingdom) Jenson O’Neill-Going	3^{3}	1	6	6	2	6^{4}	1	Ret	Ret	11	2^{3}	Ret	7	1		323	21	302
5	(United Kingdom) Harry Bloor	4	8	7	7^{5}	Ret	8^{3}	6	4^{3}	1	1	7^{6}	7	4^{2}	Ret		301	9	292
6	(United Kingdom) Brad Hutchison	Ret^{6}	4	2	8^{2}	Ret	2^{6}	5	12	Ret	6	4	2	5^{5}	3		290		290
7	(Republic of Ireland) Rod McGovern	2	7	Ret	5	7	7	8	6	5	7	9	8	6^{4}	5		267	13	254
8	(United Kingdom) Carl Boardley	Ret^{5}	Ret	3	4	3	5^{5}	2	5^{5}	Ret	4						203	6	197
9	(United Kingdom) Adam Shephard								1^{1}	2	3	1^{5}	3				184		184
10	(Republic of Ireland) Barry-John McHenry	7	Ret	13			11	9	10	6	10	8	9	Ret	6		137		137
11	(United Kingdom) Mark Smith	9	13	14	9	6	10	10	8	7	9						123		123
12	(United Kingdom) Lewis Kent	Ret	10	12	2^{3}	5											81		81
13	(United Kingdom) Rick Kerry	5	11	8			9	Ret	7	Ret	DNS						79		79
14	(United Kingdom) Jac Constable	1	5	10													75		75
15	(United Kingdom) Russell Joyce	6	12	9	Ret	DNS	WD	WD	9	Ret	8						69		69
16	(United Kingdom) Luke Sargeant											6	6				42		42
17	(United Kingdom) Jenson Mason	Ret	9	4													40		40
18	(United Kingdom) Luke Allen	8	14	DNS			12	11									34		34
19	(Republic of Ireland) Alastair Kellett				Ret	8											15		15
20	(United Kingdom) Jeff Alden	10	Ret	Ret													11		11
