= Max Hart (racing driver) =

Irish racing driver (born 2001)

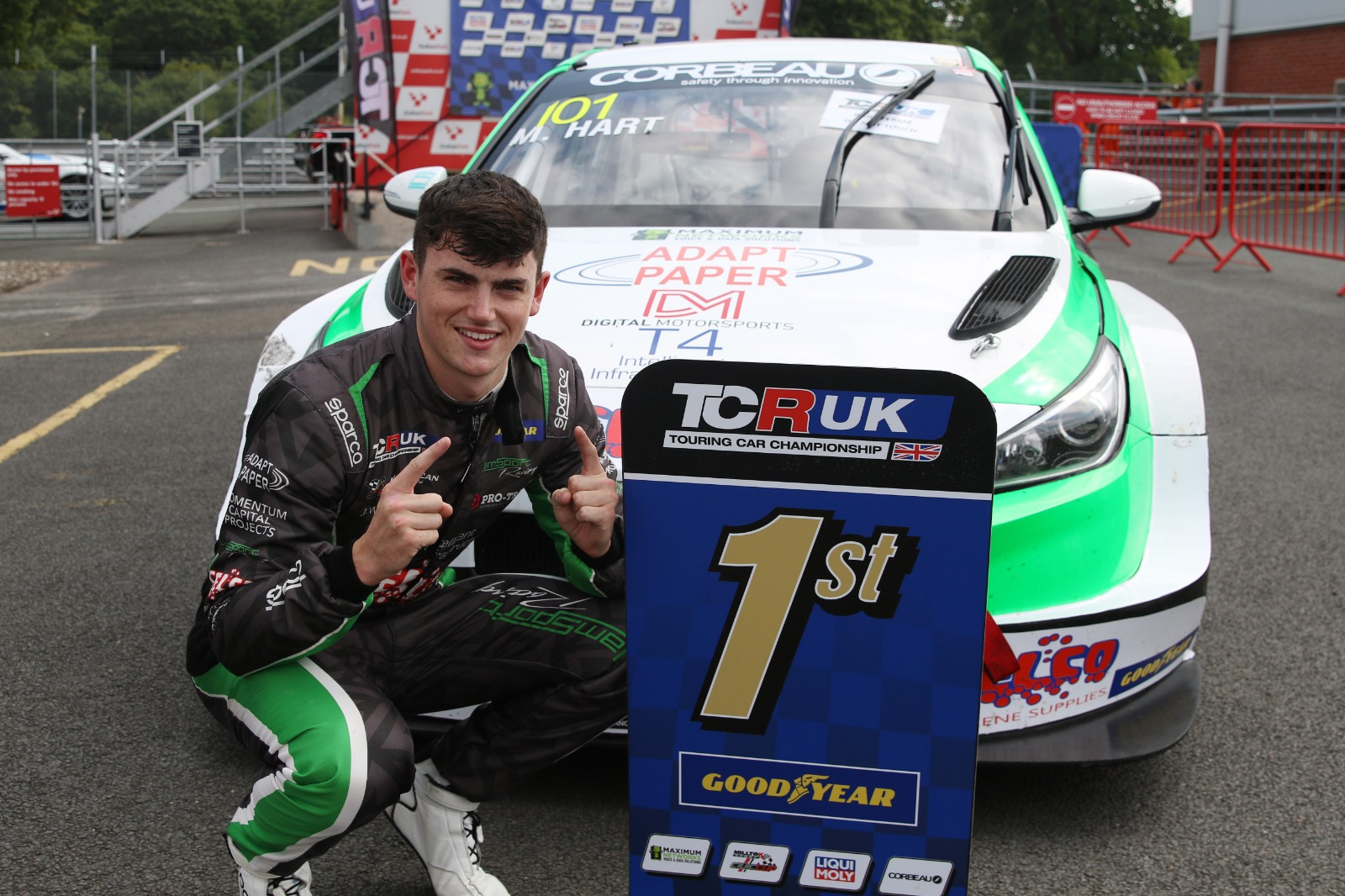
- Hart in 2022
- Nationality: (Republic of Ireland) Irish
- Born: 29 April 2001 (age 25) Baltinglass, Ireland

Max Hart (born 29 April 2001) is an Irish racing driver who last competed in TCR Europe for ALM Motorsport and TCR UK for Vannin Motorsport.

== Career ==
Hart began his single-seater career in 2018, racing in the Brands Hatch round of the Reprise IT Tiedeman Trophy for Leastone Racing Team, as well as winning the Irish Formula Vee Star of Tomorrow Championship. Remaining with the team for the following year's Monoposto Championship, Hart took wins at Castle Combe and Silverstone as he ended the year runner-up in the Mono 1000 standings. After being nominated as a Motorsport Ireland Young Racing Driver of the Year, Hart made his Formula 4 debut in the final Sepang round of the Formula 4 South East Asia Championship, taking a best result of third in race three.

Switching to TCR competition for 2020, Hart joined Maximum Motorsport to race in the Touring Car Trophy, Hart won the finale at Donington Park and finished third in the other six races en route to a third-place points finish. Continuing with Maximum Motorsport for the following year, Hart won the season-opening race at Silverstone and took six more podiums to end the year fourth in points. In 2022, Hart remained in the newly-rebranded TCR UK Touring Car Championship as he switched to JamSport Racing for his third season in TCR competition. Hart won both races at Donington Park and finished second in both Oulton Park races, and ended the year eighth in points despite parting ways with the team ahead of the Snetterton finale.

Transitioning to TCR China and Hyundai N Team Z.Speed for the following year, took his only win of the season in Macau and a podium at Shanghai to round out the year sixth in points. Remaining with the same team to race in TCR Asia for 2024, Hart began the year by qualifying on pole for the season opener at Sepang, in which he finished second, before ending the weekend with his first win of the season in race two. After four consecutive podiums, Hart took his second and final win of the year in race one of the second Buriram round, which helped him end the year third in points. During 2024, Hart also made his TCR World Tour debut at Macau, a round which was held in conjunction with TCR Asia.

Returning to Europe for 2025, Hart joined Target Competition for his rookie year in TCR Europe. In the six-round season, he took a lone win at Hockenheimring from third on the grid, as well as finishing second in race two and taking a third-place finish in race two at the Red Bull Ring, as he ended the season eighth in points. At the end of the year, Hart made a one-off appearance in the TCR World Tour for SP Competition at Macau.

The following year, Hart joined ALM Motorsport to continue in TCR Europe, as well as joining Hall Racing to return to TCR UK competition. In TCR Europe, Hart took a best result of fourth at Mugello, before skipping the last two rounds following a crash at Monza. In TCR UK, Hart took a lone win at Snetterton and four other podiums, before switching to Vannin Motorsport for the final two rounds and ending the year third overall with an additional win at Brands Hatch.

== Racing record ==
=== Racing career summary ===
Season	Series	Team	Races	Wins	Poles	F/Laps	Podiums	Points	Position
2018	Reprise IT Tiedeman Trophy	Leastone Racing Team	2	0	0	0	1	35	14th
2019	Monoposto Championship – Mono 1000	Leastone Racing Team	14	2	1	1	8	93	**2nd**
2019	Formula 4 South East Asia Championship	Meritus.GP	4	0	0	0	1	0	NC
2020	Touring Car Trophy	Maximum Motorsport	7	1	0	0	7	101	**3rd**
2021	Touring Car Trophy	Maximum Motorsport with Motus One Racing	14	1	2	2	7	219	4th
2022	TCR UK Touring Car Championship	JamSport Racing	13	2	0	4	4	226	8th
2022	British Endurance Championship – Class E	T4 Motorsport	2	0	0	0	1	42	7th
2023	TCR China Touring Car Championship	Hyundai N Team Z.Speed	12	1	0	0	2	91	6th
2023	GT Cup Championship – GTH	T4 with Brookspeed	3	0	0	0	0	0	NC
2023	British Endurance Championship – TCR	T4 Motorsport						20	7th
2024	TCR Asia Series	Hyundai N Team Z.Speed	10	2	2	1	8	317	**3rd**
2024	TCR World Tour	Hyundai N Team Z.Speed	2	0	0	0	0	0	NC
2025	TCR Europe Touring Car Series	Target Competition	12	1	0	1	3	145	8th
2025	TCR World Tour	SP Competition	2	0	0	1	0	24	22nd
2025	TCR Australia Touring Car Series	SP Competition	2	0	0	1	0	0	NC†
2026	TCR Europe Touring Car Series	ALM Motorsport	8	0	0	0	0	69	15th
2026	TCR UK Touring Car Championship	ALM Motorsport	12	1	0	1	5	421	**3rd**
2026	TCR UK Touring Car Championship	Vannin Motorsport	4	1	0	0	2	421	**3rd**

=== Complete TCR UK Touring Car Championship results ===
(key) (Races in bold indicate pole position – 1 point awarded just in first race; races in italics indicate fastest lap – 1 point awarded all races; * signifies that driver led race for at least one lap – 1 point given all races)

Year	Team	Car	1	2	3	4	5	6	7	8	9	10	11	12	13	14	15	16	17	DC	Points
2020	Maximum Motorsport	CUPRA León TCR	OUL; 1; 3	OUL; 2; 3	SIL; 1; 3	SIL; 2; 3	DON; 1; 3^{5}	DON; 2; 3	DON; 3; 1											3rd	101
2021	Maximum Motorsport with Motus One Racing	Hyundai i30 N TCR	**SIL**; **1**; 1^{1}	SIL; 2; 2	CAS; 1 DSQ	CAS; 2; 3	BRH; 1 Ret	BRH; 2; 6	BRH; 3; 2	OUL; 1; 4	OUL; 2; 3	ANG; 1; 2	ANG; 2 Ret	DON; 1; 5	DON; 2; 2	DON; 3; 10				4th	219
2022	JamSport Racing	Hyundai i30 N TCR	OUL; 1; 2^{4}	OUL; 2; 2	DON; 1; 1^{4}	DON; 2; 1	BRH; 1; 8	BRH; 2; 5	BRH; 3; 5	OUL; 1 Ret	OUL; 2 Ret	CAS; 1 Ret	CAS; 2 Ret	DON; 1 Ret^{3}	DON; 2 Ret	SNE; 1	SNE; 2			8th	226
2026	ALM Motorsport	Honda Civic Type R TCR (FL5)	BHI1; 1 Ret^{4}	BHI1; 2; 2	BHI1; 3; 5	CRO; 1; 3^{6}	CRO; 2; 4	SNE; 1; 1^{2}	SNE; 2; 4	DON1; 1; 3^{4}	DON1; 2; 3	DON1; 3; 5	DON2; 1; 5^{2}	DON2; 2; 4						3rd	421
2026	Vannin Motorsport	Audi RS 3 LMS TCR (2021)													OUL; 1; 3^{6}	OUL; 2; 4	BHI2; 1 DNS	BHI2; 2; 1	BHI2; 3; 6	3rd	421

=== Complete TCR China Touring Car Championship results ===
(key) (Races in bold indicate pole position) (Races in italics indicate fastest lap)

Year	Team	Car	1	2	3	4	5	6	7	8	9	10	11	12	DC	Points
2023	Hyundai N Team Z.Speed	Hyundai Elantra N TCR	SHA1; 1 Ret	SHA1; 2 Ret	ZHE; 1; 9	ZHE; 2; 6	ZHZ1; 1; 4	ZHZ1; 2; 7	SHA2; 1 Ret	SHA2; 2; 2	ZHZ2; 1; 6	ZHZ2; 2; 15	MAC; 1; 4	MAC; 2; 1	6th	91

=== Complete TCR Asia Series results ===
(key) (Races in bold indicate pole position) (Races in italics indicate fastest lap)

Year	Team	Car	1	2	3	4	5	6	7	8	9	10	DC	Points
2024	Hyundai N Team Z.Speed	Hyundai Elantra N TCR	**SEP1**; **1**; 2^{1}	SEP1; 2; 1	SEP2; 1; 2^{3}	SEP2; 2; 2	BUR1; 1; 2^{3}	BUR1; 2; 3	**BUR2**; **1**; 1^{1}	BUR2; 2; 3	MAC; 1 Ret^{2}	MAC; 2 Ret	3rd	317

=== Complete TCR World Tour results ===
(key) (Races in bold indicate pole position) (Races in italics indicate fastest lap)

Year	Team	Car	1	2	3	4	5	6	7	8	9	10	11	12	13	14	15	16	17	18	19	20	DC	Points
2024	Team Hyundai N Z.Speed	Hyundai Elantra N TCR	ITA; 1	ITA; 2	MAR; 1	MAR; 2	USA; 1	USA; 2	BRA; 1	BRA; 2	URU; 1	URU; 2	CHN; 1	CHN; 2	MAC; 1 Ret	MAC; 2 Ret							NC	0
2025	SP Competition	Cupra León VZ TCR	MEX; 1	MEX; 2	MEX; 3	ESP; 1	ESP; 2	ESP; 3	ITA; 1	ITA; 2	POR; 1	POR; 2	AUS; 1	AUS; 2	AUS; 3	KOR; 1	KOR; 2	KOR; 3	CHN; 1	CHN; 2	MAC; 1; 9	MAC; 2; 7	22nd	24

=== Complete TCR Europe Touring Car Series results ===
(key) (Races in bold indicate pole position) (Races in italics indicate fastest lap)

Year	Team	Car	1	2	3	4	5	6	7	8	9	10	11	12	DC	Points
2025	Target Competition	Hyundai Elantra N TCR (2024)	PRT; 1; 11	PRT; 2; 7	SPA; 1; 15	SPA; 2; 11	HOC; 1; 1^{3}	HOC; 2; 2	MIS; 1; 11	MIS; 2; 15	RBR; 1; 7	RBR; 2; 3	CAT; 1; 11	CAT; 2; 10	8th	145
2026	ALM Motorsport	Honda Civic Type R TCR (FL5)	MUG; 1; 4	MUG; 2 Ret	SPA; 1; 9	SPA; 2; 5	LEC; 1; 18	LEC; 2 Ret	HUN; 1; 5	HUN; 2; 13	MNZ; 1 WD	MNZ; 2 WD	CAT; 1	CAT; 2	15th	69
