= 2024 TCR Asia Series =

Car racing event

The 2024 TCR Asia Series season was the eighth season of the TCR Asia Series.

The driver's championship was won by Zhang Zhendong in a Hyundai Elantra N TCR. The inaugural TCR Cup was won by Benny Santoso also in a Hyundai Elantra N TCR.

== Calendar ==
The provisional 2024 schedule was announced on 27 January 2024, with five events scheduled. It was updated in April to with the start of the series moving from 20 April to 3 May.

Late in the season, it was announced that the fifth round at the Zhuzhou International Circuit was replaced by the Guia Circuit.

Rnd.		Circuit	Date	Supporting
1	1	(Malaysia) Sepang International Circuit, Sepang	3–5 May	Lamborghini Super Trofeo Asia; Malaysia Championship Series
1	2	(Malaysia) Sepang International Circuit, Sepang	3–5 May	Lamborghini Super Trofeo Asia; Malaysia Championship Series
2	3	(Malaysia) Sepang International Circuit, Sepang	7–9 June	Malaysia Championship Series
2	4	(Malaysia) Sepang International Circuit, Sepang	7–9 June	Malaysia Championship Series
3	5	(Thailand) Buriram International Circuit, Buriram	23–25 August	Thailand Super Series
3	6	(Thailand) Buriram International Circuit, Buriram	23–25 August	Thailand Super Series
4	7	(Thailand) Buriram International Circuit, Buriram	13–15 September	RAAT Thailand Endurance Championship
4	8	(Thailand) Buriram International Circuit, Buriram	13–15 September	RAAT Thailand Endurance Championship
5	9	Guia Circuit, Macau Peninsula, Macau	14–17 November	Macau Guia Race; TCR China Touring Car Championship; TCR World Tour
5	10	Guia Circuit, Macau Peninsula, Macau	14–17 November	Macau Guia Race; TCR China Touring Car Championship; TCR World Tour
Cancelled
Circuit			Original Date	
(China) Zhuzhou International Circuit, Zhuzhou			18–20 October	

== Teams and drivers ==
Team	Car	No.	Drivers	Class	Rounds	Ref.
(Indonesia) JVS Group Racing Team	Audi RS 3 LMS TCR (2021)	11	(Indonesia) Budiyanto	T	1–2	
(China) Hyundai N Team Z.Speed	Hyundai Elantra N TCR	14	(South Korea) Hwang Do-yun		All	
(China) Hyundai N Team Z.Speed	Hyundai Elantra N TCR	18	(China) Zhang Zhendong		All	
(China) Hyundai N Team Z.Speed	Hyundai Elantra N TCR	56	(Indonesia) Benny Santoso	T	All	
(China) Hyundai N Team Z.Speed	Hyundai Elantra N TCR	69	(Republic of Ireland) Max Hart		All	
(China) Z.Speed Motorsport	Hyundai Elantra N TCR	21	(China) Jiang Nan	T	1–4	
(China) Z.Speed Motorsport	Hyundai Elantra N TCR	52	(Malaysia) Jonathan Xie Boyu	G	1	
(China) Z.Speed Motorsport	Hyundai Elantra N TCR	83	(China) Liu Qiren	T	1–4	
(China) Z.Speed Motorsport	Hyundai Elantra N TCR	97	(China) Yang Haojie	T	1–3	
(China) Z.Speed Motorsport	Honda Civic Type R TCR (FL5)	28	(Thailand) Ananthorn Tangniannatchai	G	3	
(Malaysia) Viper Niza Racing	Cupra León TCR	65	(Malaysia) Douglas Khoo	G	2	
(Indonesia) Delta Garage Racing Team	Hyundai Elantra N TCR	82	(Indonesia) Dypo Fitramadhan	T	1, 3–5	
(Indonesia) Delta Garage Racing Team	Honda Civic Type R TCR (FL5)	86	(Indonesia) Umar Abdullah		1–4	

Icon	Status
T	Eligible for TCR Cup
G	Guest drivers ineligible to score points

== Results ==
Rnd.		Circuit/Location	Pole position	Fastest lap	Winning driver	Winning team	Report
1	1	(Malaysia) Sepang International Circuit	(Republic of Ireland) Max Hart	(China) Zhang Zhendong	(China) Zhang Zhendong	(China) Hyundai N Team Z.Speed	
1	2	(Malaysia) Sepang International Circuit		(China) Zhang Zhendong	(Republic of Ireland) Max Hart	(China) Hyundai N Team Z.Speed	
2	3	(Malaysia) Sepang International Circuit	(China) Zhang Zhendong	(China) Zhang Zhendong	(China) Zhang Zhendong	(China) Hyundai N Team Z.Speed	
2	4	(Malaysia) Sepang International Circuit		(South Korea) Hwang Do-yun	(China) Zhang Zhendong	(China) Hyundai N Team Z.Speed	
3	5	(Thailand) Buriram International Circuit	(China) Zhang Zhendong	(China) Zhang Zhendong	(South Korea) Hwang Do-yun	(China) Hyundai N Team Z.Speed	
3	6	(Thailand) Buriram International Circuit		(China) Zhang Zhendong	(China) Zhang Zhendong	(China) Hyundai N Team Z.Speed	
4	7	(Thailand) Buriram International Circuit	(Republic of Ireland) Max Hart	(China) Zhang Zhendong	(Republic of Ireland) Max Hart	(China) Hyundai N Team Z.Speed	
4	8	(Thailand) Buriram International Circuit		(China) Zhang Zhendong	(Indonesia) Umar Abdullah	(Indonesia) Delta Garage Racing Team	
5	9	(Macau) Guia Circuit	(China) Zhang Zhendong	(China) Zhang Zhendong	(China) Zhang Zhendong	(China) Hyundai N Team Z.Speed	
5	10	(Macau) Guia Circuit		(Republic of Ireland) Max Hart	(Indonesia) Dypo Fitramadhan	(Indonesia) Delta Garage Racing Team	

== Points standings ==
Scoring system

Position	1st	2nd	3rd	4th	5th	6th	7th	8th	9th	10th
Qualifying	10	7	5	4	3	2	1	—		
Races	40	35	30	27	24	21	18	15	13	11

=== Drivers' Championship ===
==== Overall ====
Pos.	Driver	SEP1 (Malaysia)		SEP2 (Malaysia)		BUR1 (Thailand)		BUR2 (Thailand)		MAC (Macau)		Pts.
1	(China) Zhang Zhendong	1^{2}	2	1^{1}	1	4^{1}	1	2^{2}	2	1^{1}	Ret	376
2	(South Korea) Hwang Do-yun	3^{7}	4	5^{2}	3	1^{2}	2	3^{3}	5	2^{3}	3	340
3	(Republic of Ireland) Max Hart	2^{1}	1	2^{3}	2	2^{3}	3	1^{1}	3	Ret^{2}	Ret	317
4	(Indonesia) Umar Abdullah	4^{4}	3	Ret^{4}	5	3^{6}	6	Ret^{5}	1			185
5	(Indonesia) Benny Santosa	8^{6}	5	3^{5}	4	8^{4}	4	5^{6}	Ret	4^{4}	2	173
6	(Indonesia) Dypo Fitramadhan	5^{3}	7			5	5	4^{7}	4	3^{5}	1	150
7	(China) Liu Qiren	7	9	4^{6}	7	7	10	7	6			148
8	(China) Jiang Nan	9	8	7^{7}	8	6^{5}	7	6^{4}	Ret			129
9	(China) Yang Haojie	Ret	6	6	9	9^{7}	9					84
10	(Indonesia) Budiyanto	6^{5}	Ret	Ret	6							45
Ineligible for driver points
	(Thailand) Ananthorn Tangniannatchai					10	8					
	(Malaysia) Douglas Khoo			8	10							
	(Malaysia) Jonathan Xie Boyu	Ret	DNS									
Pos.	Driver	SEP1 (Malaysia)		SEP2 (Malaysia)		BUR1 (Thailand)		BUR2 (Thailand)		MAC (Macau)		Pts.

Colour	Result
Gold	Winner
Silver	Second place
Bronze	Third place
Green	Points classification
Blue	Non-points classification
Blue	Non-classified finish (NC)
Purple	Retired, not classified (Ret)
Red	Did not qualify (DNQ)
Red	Did not pre-qualify (DNPQ)
Black	Disqualified (DSQ)
White	Did not start (DNS)
White	Withdrew (WD)
White	Race cancelled (C)
Blank	Did not practice (DNP)
Blank	Did not arrive (DNA)
Blank	Excluded (EX)

Italics – Fastest Lap

==== TCR Cup ====
Pos.	Driver	SEP1 (Malaysia)		SEP2 (Malaysia)		BUR1 (Thailand)		BUR2 (Thailand)		MAC (Macau)		Pts.
1	(Indonesia) Benny Santosa	8^{3}	5	3^{1}	4	8^{1}	4	5^{2}	Ret	4^{1}	2	361
2	(Indonesia) Dypo Fitramadhan	5^{1}	7			5^{4}	5	4^{3}	4	3^{2}	1	331
3	(China) Liu Qiren	7^{5}	9	4^{2}	7	7^{5}	10	7^{4}	6			252
4	(China) Jiang Nan	9^{4}	8	7^{3}	8	6^{2}	7	6^{1}	Ret			226
4	(China) Yang Haojie	Ret^{6}	6	6^{5}	9	9^{3}	9					150
6	(Indonesia) Budiyanto	6^{2}	Ret	Ret^{4}	6							81
Pos.	Driver	SEP1 (Malaysia)		SEP2 (Malaysia)		BUR1 (Thailand)		BUR2 (Thailand)		MAC (Macau)		Pts.

Colour	Result
Gold	Winner
Silver	Second place
Bronze	Third place
Green	Points classification
Blue	Non-points classification
Blue	Non-classified finish (NC)
Purple	Retired, not classified (Ret)
Red	Did not qualify (DNQ)
Red	Did not pre-qualify (DNPQ)
Black	Disqualified (DSQ)
White	Did not start (DNS)
White	Withdrew (WD)
White	Race cancelled (C)
Blank	Did not practice (DNP)
Blank	Did not arrive (DNA)
Blank	Excluded (EX)

**Bold** – Pole
Italics – Fastest Lap
