= AFM Racing =

UK motorsport team

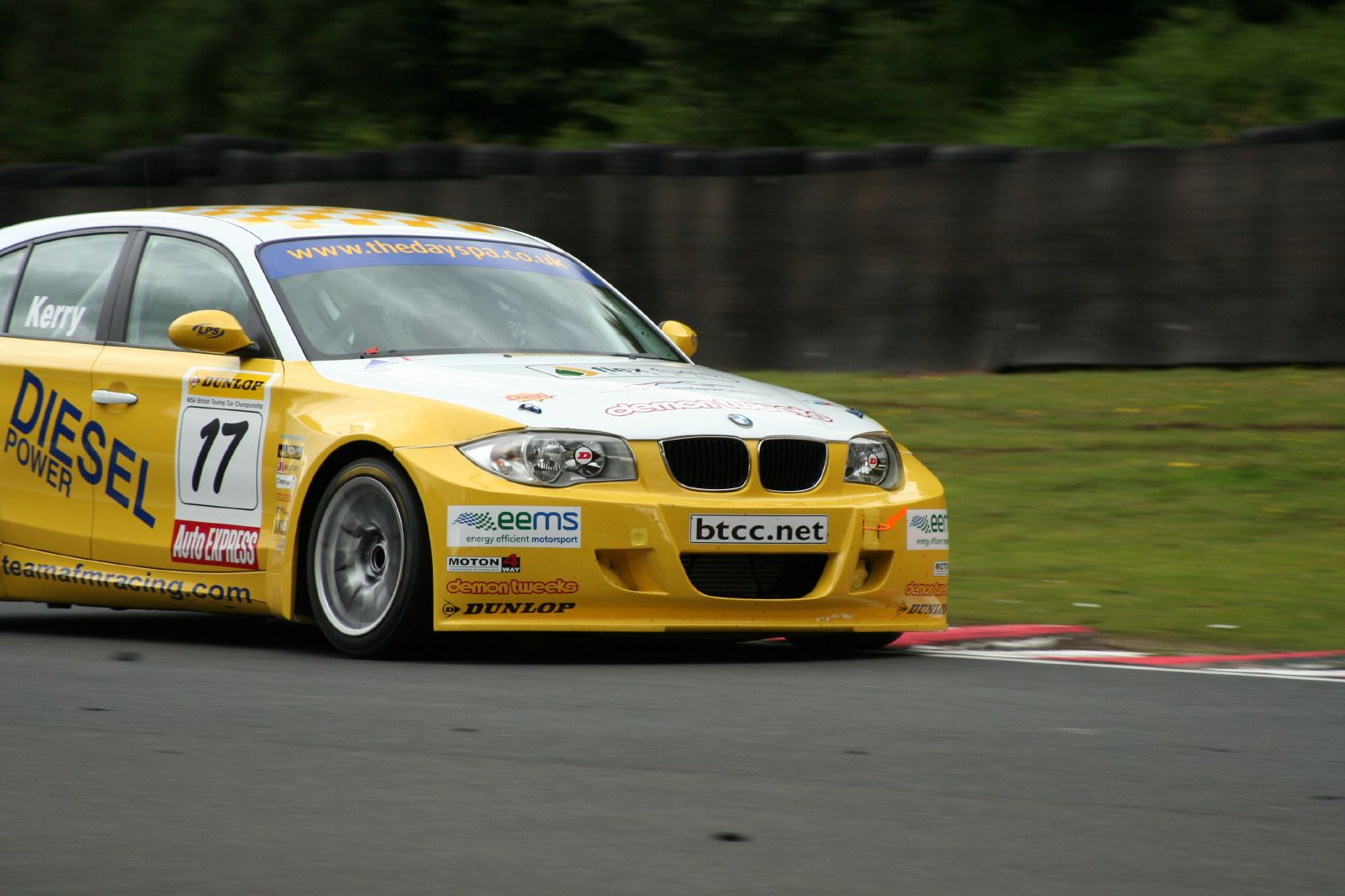
Rick Kerry driving an AFM Racing-run BMW 120d at the Oulton Park round of the 2007 British Touring Car Championship

AFM Racing is a United Kingdom–based motorsport team, run by owner-driver Rick Kerry. In 2007 they first competed in the British Touring Car Championship. They ran a BMW 120d (the championship's first ever diesel car).

The team also built and were running Liam Hamilton's BMW E36 318is. The car, which running in similar livery to Rick Kerry's BMW 1 Series, competed in the Kumho BMW Championship. This was where Kerry himself used to compete, before making the step up to the BTCC.

In 2009 AFM Racing returned to the BTCC after one year out, which was spent improving the car. After initially intending on entering two cars, sponsorship problems saw just one BMW 120d entered, for Nick Leason.
