= Hyundai N 2025 Vision Gran Turismo =

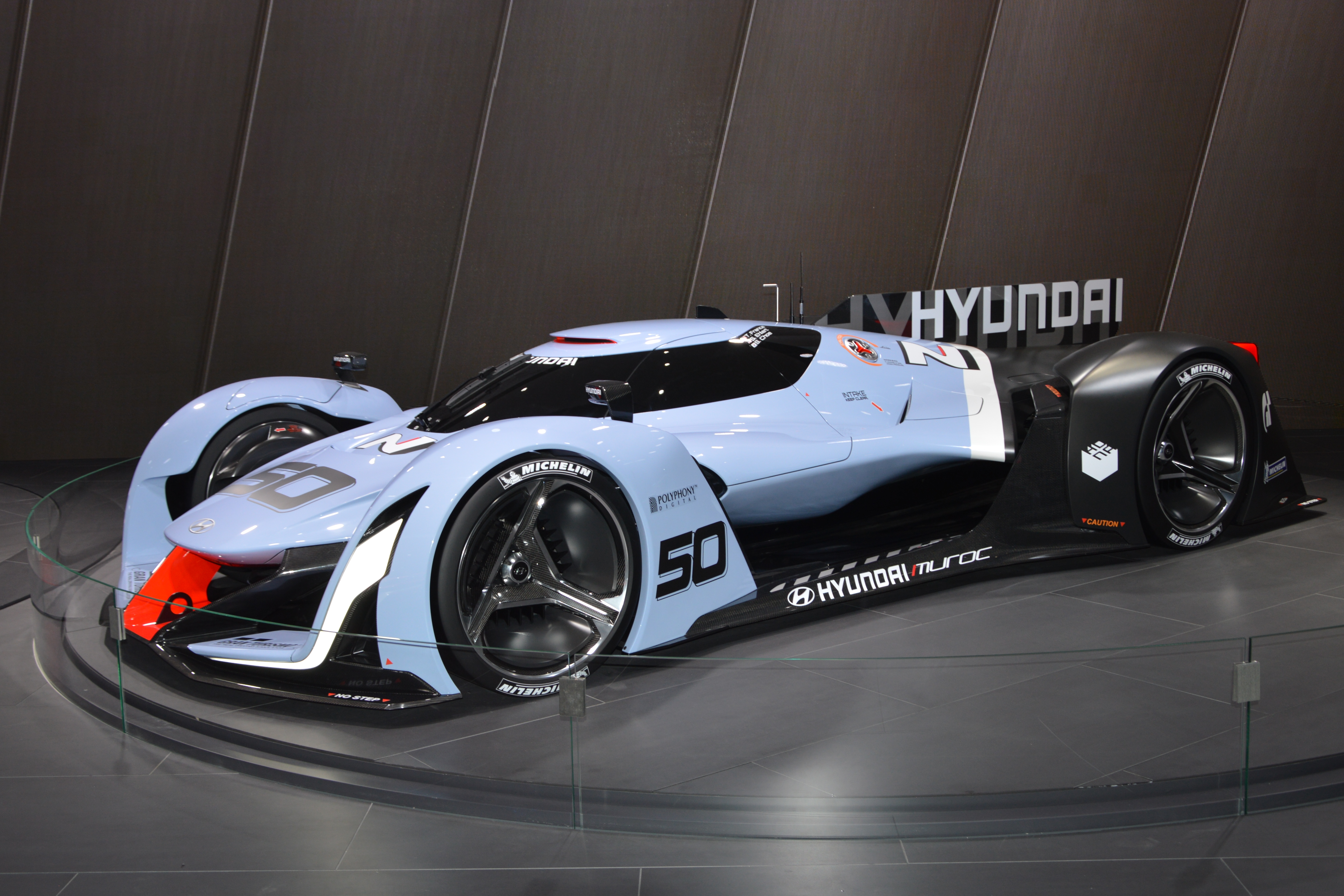

Overview
- Manufacturer: Hyundai
- Model years: 2015
- Designer: Albert Biermann

Body and chassis
- Layout: Mid-engine, all-wheel-drive

Powertrain
- Electric motor: 4 electric motors powered by hydrogen fuel cells
- Power output: 650 kW (872 hp)
- Transmission: 1-speed

Dimensions
- Curb weight: 971 kg (2,140 lb)

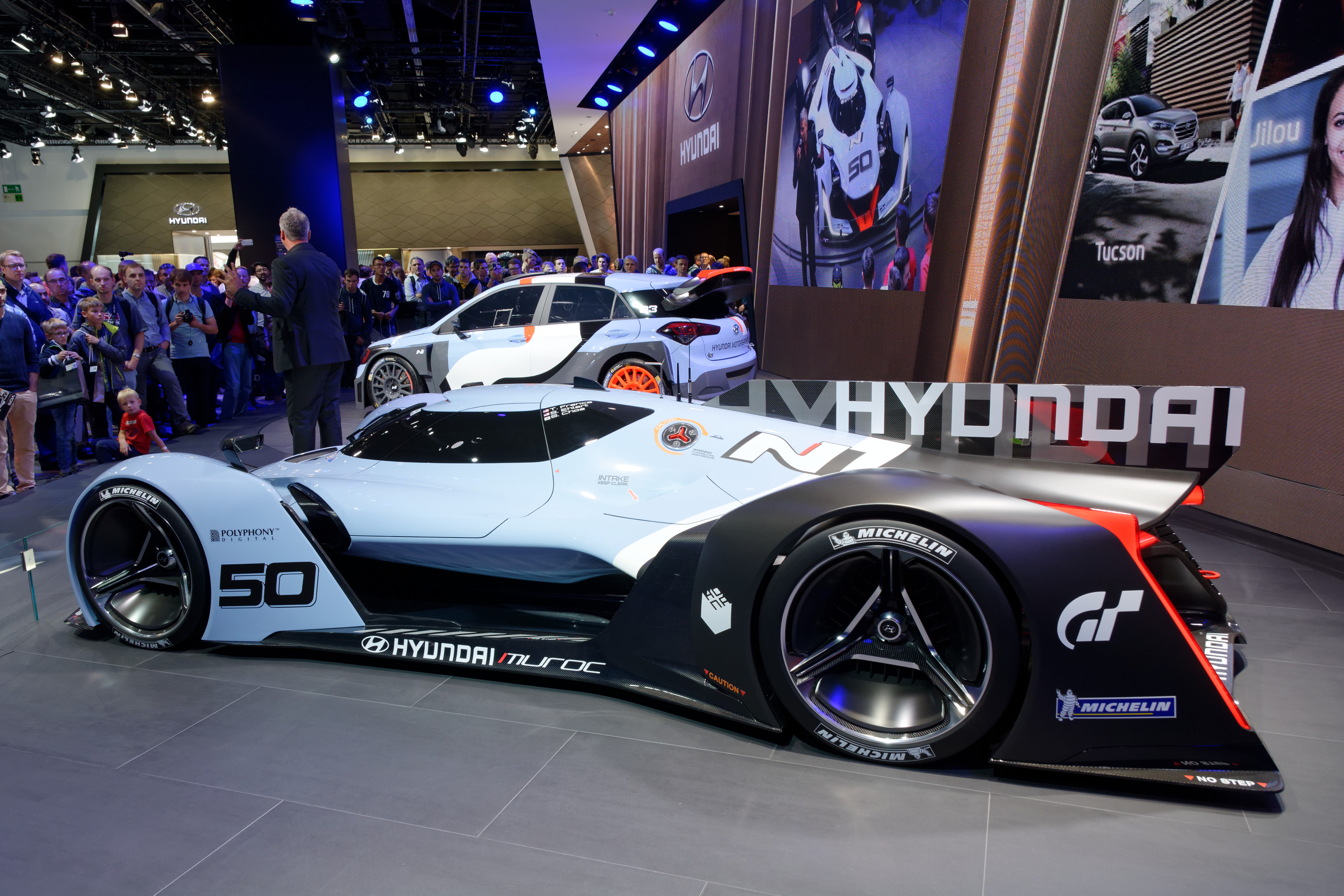
Rear view

The Hyundai N 2025 Vision Gran Turismo is a concept car developed by Hyundai. The car was unveiled at the 2015 Frankfurt Motor Show. It was built under the Vision Gran Turismo project and to commemorate Hyundai's 50th anniversary in 2017. It also served as a launch platform for Hyundai's N performance division, as well as a glimpse into the future of fuel cell technology in motorsports.

== Media ==
The N 2025 Vision Gran Turismo is featured in the Polyphony Digital games Gran Turismo Sport and Gran Turismo 7 as a Group X car (category made for Vision Gran Turismo cars and cars that do not fit into any other of the game's categories) and as a Group 1 car (category made for prototype race cars).

== See also ==
- Hyundai N
- Gran Turismo Sport
- Vision Gran Turismo
