= 2020 Touring Car Trophy =

The 2020 Touring Car Trophy is the second season of the Touring Car Trophy. The championship features production-based touring cars built to either NGTC, TCR or Super 2000 specifications and will compete in fourteen races across seven meetings across England. The championship is aimed as a feeder category to the BTCC and operated by Stewart Lines' Maximum Group. For 2020, a revised list of regulations mean that both the TCR UK and TCT series will be combined to run as the same series; the Touring Car Trophy. As well as drivers competing overall for the TCT title, drivers in TCR-spec cars will also compete for the TCR UK trophy. The championship will also be supported by the Volkswagen Racing Cup, which is also run by Maximum Group. The Volkswagen Racing Cup competitors will race alongside the TCT grid in 2020.

Henry Neal won the Touring Car Trophy title and Lewis Kent won the TCR UK title.

== Calendar ==
The calendar was announced on 24 November 2019 with 7 rounds scheduled. The opening round, originally held at Silverstone on 17–18 April, was postponed due to the COVID-19 pandemic and the opening round moved to Croft on 6–7 June. The following rounds at Croft and Brands Hatch were then cancelled. On 21 May 2020 a new revised calendar was announced and three rounds were confirmed.

Rnd.		Circuit/Location	Date
1	1	Oulton Park, Cheshire	18 July
1	2	Oulton Park, Cheshire	18 July
2	3	Silverstone Circuit (National), Northamptonshire	12–13 September
2	4	Silverstone Circuit (National), Northamptonshire	12–13 September
3	5	Donington Park (National), Leicestershire	17–18 October
3	6	Donington Park (National), Leicestershire	17–18 October
3	7	Donington Park (National), Leicestershire	17–18 October
Cancelled due to the 2019-20 coronavirus pandemic
Circuit/Location			Date
Silverstone Circuit (International), Northamptonshire			18–19 April
Croft Circuit, North Yorkshire			6–7 June
Brands Hatch (Indy), Kent			21 June
Snetterton Circuit (300), Norfolk			8–9 August
Thruxton Circuit, Hampshire			22–23 August

== Teams and drivers ==
Team	Car	No.	Drivers	Rounds
TCR entries
PMR TradePriceCars.com	CUPRA León TCR	9	(United Kingdom) Dan Kirby	1–2
PMR TradePriceCars.com	CUPRA León TCR	70	(United Kingdom) William Butler	2–3
PMR TradePriceCars.com	CUPRA León TCR	77	(United Kingdom) Sam Osborne	3
Matrix Motorsport	Honda Civic Type R TCR (FK2)	19	(United Kingdom) Jeff Alden	3
Maximum Motorsport	CUPRA León TCR	22	(United Kingdom) Mark Wakefield	3
Maximum Motorsport	CUPRA León TCR	101	(Republic of Ireland) Max Hart	All
Maximum Motorsport	Volkswagen Golf GTI TCR	78	(United Kingdom) Tim Docker	All
Essex & Kent Motorsport	Hyundai i30 N TCR	38	(United Kingdom) Lewis Kent	All
DW Racing	Vauxhall Astra TCR	50	(United Kingdom) Darelle Wilson	All
NGTC entries
Team Dynamics	Honda Civic Type R (FK2)	42	(United Kingdom) Henry Neal	All

== Race calendar and results ==
Round	Circuit	Pole position	Fastest lap	Winning driver	Winning team	TCR UK winner
1	Oulton Park	(United Kingdom) Dan Kirby	(United Kingdom) Henry Neal	(United Kingdom) Henry Neal	Team Dynamics	(United Kingdom) Lewis Kent
1	Oulton Park		(United Kingdom) Lewis Kent	(United Kingdom) Lewis Kent	Essex & Kent Motorsport	(United Kingdom) Lewis Kent
2	Silverstone Circuit	(United Kingdom) Henry Neal	(United Kingdom) Henry Neal	(United Kingdom) Henry Neal	Team Dynamics	(United Kingdom) Lewis Kent
2	Silverstone Circuit		(United Kingdom) Henry Neal	(United Kingdom) Lewis Kent	Essex & Kent Motorsport	(United Kingdom) Lewis Kent
3	Donington Park	(United Kingdom) Lewis Kent	(United Kingdom) Sam Osborne	(United Kingdom) Henry Neal	Team Dynamics	(United Kingdom) Lewis Kent
3	Donington Park		(United Kingdom) Sam Osborne	(United Kingdom) Henry Neal	Team Dynamics	(United Kingdom) Lewis Kent
3	Donington Park	(United Kingdom) Lewis Kent	(United Kingdom) Henry Neal	(Republic of Ireland) Max Hart	Maximum Motorsport	(Republic of Ireland) Max Hart

== Championship standings ==
=== Drivers' standings ===
Points system
1st	2nd	3rd	4th	5th	6th	7th	8th	9th	10th	Q 1st	Q 2nd	Q 3rd	Q 4th	Q 5th
25	18	15	12	10	8	6	4	2	1	5	4	3	2	1

Pos	Driver	(United Kingdom) OUL		(United Kingdom) SIL		(United Kingdom) DON			Points
Pos	Driver	RD1	RD2	RD1	RD2	RD1	RD2	RD3	Points
1	(United Kingdom) Henry Neal	1^{3}	2	1^{1}	2	1^{2}	1	2	148
2	(United Kingdom) Lewis Kent	2^{2}	1	2^{4}	1	2^{1}	2	3	133
3	(Republic of Ireland) Max Hart	3	3	3	3	3^{5}	3	1	101
4	(United Kingdom) Darelle Wilson	Ret^{4}	4	Ret^{5}	7	4	4	5	57
5	(United Kingdom) Dan Kirby	4^{1}	Ret	5^{2}	4				43
6	(United Kingdom) Tim Docker	5^{5}	5	4	5	Ret	DNS	DNS	43
7	(United Kingdom) William Butler			6^{3}	6	Ret^{4}	Ret	4	35
8	(United Kingdom) Mark Wakefield					5	5	Ret	20
9	(United Kingdom) Jeff Alden					6	Ret	DNS	8
10	(United Kingdom) Sam Osborne					Ret^{3}	Ret	DNS	3
Pos	Driver	(United Kingdom) OUL		(United Kingdom) SIL		(United Kingdom) DON			Points

=== Teams' Standings ===
Pos	Team	(United Kingdom) OUL		(United Kingdom) SIL		(United Kingdom) DON			Points
Pos	Team	RD1	RD2	RD1	RD2	RD1	RD2	RD3	Points
1	Maximum Motorsport	3	3	3	3	3^{5}	3	1	164
1	Maximum Motorsport	5^{5}	5	4	5	5	5	Ret	164
2	Team Dynamics	1^{3}	2	1^{1}	2	1^{2}	1	2	148
3	Essex & Kent Motorsport	2^{2}	1	2^{4}	1	2^{1}	2	3	133
4	PMR TradePriceCars.com	4^{1}	Ret	5^{2}	4	Ret^{3}	Ret	4	81
4	PMR TradePriceCars.com			6^{3}	6	Ret^{4}	Ret	DNS	81
5	DW Racing	Ret^{4}	4	Ret^{5}	8	4	4	5	57
6	Matrix Motorsport					13	Ret	DNS	8
Pos	Team	(United Kingdom) OUL		(United Kingdom) SIL		(United Kingdom) DON			Points
