= Kumho BMW Championship =

- Category: Touring Car
- Country: United Kingdom
- Inaugural season: 1987
- Drivers: 42 (2013); 47 (2012); 37 (2011); 37 (2010); 46 (2009); 34 (2008); 28 (2007)
- Constructors: BMW (single make series)
- Drivers' champion: Greg Marking
- Official website: www.bmwrdc.com

The Kumho BMW Championship is a single make racing series based in the UK. Exclusively for BMWs, the championship is run by the BMW Racing Drivers Club in conjunction with the British Automobile Racing Club (BARC). The championship is a BARC registered, BMW-exclusive motorsport series.

== Introduction ==
The Championship is open to any production BMW sold in the UK. It provides close competition in four classes split by a power-to-weight ratio. The aim of the championship is to provide a closely competitive series for drivers, having a low cost entry class where cars can be competitive running standard engines, and a ladder of increasing cost and performance accommodating the latest vehicles. In 2009, 46 contenders scored points in the championship with the race victories shared between 9 drivers across the four classes.

== History ==
The BMW Car Club Championship was started in 1987 by husband and wife team, John and Linda McVicker. The Championship was an amateur club series, for BMW owners who wished to race their BMW's at all the national circuits in the UK. The championship was open to all types of BMW from 2002s to CSLs, Bat Mobiles, new or old. The first race meeting took place on a cold and overcast Saturday at Silverstone where it the club managed to field a full grid.

The Championship continued under the BMW Car Club banner until late 1999, where the championship was renamed to the BMW Racing Drivers Club. The championship became the ‘Drivers Club’ where all the drivers had a say in how the organisation was run, and it is continues in that fashion to this day. The series is established as one of the fastest road tyred (treaded) championships in the country, but it is not necessary to use the latest models, or to run at the front to be competitive.

- The championship has its own driving standards policed by the competitors' own BMW Racing Drivers Club, membership of which is a requirement of entry. This is in an attempt to eliminate the damage caused by modern tactics of blocking, weaving and tapping (or as it used to be known, driving into one another). Do not however think that this makes for a gentle series. Racing is getting ever closer as drivers become confident that these undesirable tactics are removed from the sport, allowing competitors to trust one another to not take out the opposition. Some founder members remain at the club today. These include Evelyne Buanic, Stuart Laws who compete in Class B and the club's president, Trevor Ford.

== The Kumho BMW's Today ==
2022 marked the 35th anniversary for the Kumho BMW Championship, and also the 25th Anniversary of successful sponsorship from Kumho Tires.

The championship is made up of four classes split by a power-to-weight ratio. There are also a number of strict regulations which all cars must adhere to. These can be viewed here.

The championship currently competes at many famous circuits in the UK, including Brands Hatch, Silverstone, Snetterton, Thruxton and Croft. The championship usually has a 14-race calendar, with 7 race weekends being double-headers (two races, one per day).

== Previous Results ==
=== 2010 ===
Overall Championship Points Table
Overall Table

Class Points Table
Class Table

Brands Hatch ... Brands Hatch 2010 Race Results
Silverstone ... Silverstone 2010 Race Results
Mallory Park non-championship meeting ... Mallory Park 2010 Race Results
Croft ... Croft 2010 Race Results
Snetterton ... Snetterton 2010 Race Results
Rockingham Motor Speedway ...Rockingham 2010 Race Results
Oulton Park ...Oulton Park 2010 Race Results
Thruxton ...Thruxton 2010 Race Results

=== 2009 ===
Overall Championship Points Table
Overall Table

Class Points Table
Class Table

Silverstone ... Silverstone 2009 Race Results
Snetterton ... Snetterton 2009 Race Results
Pembrey ... Pembrey 2009 Race Results
Croft ... Croft 2009 Race Results
Donington ... Donington 2009 Race Results
Brands Hatch ... Brands Hatch 2009 Race Results
Rockingham ... Rockingham 2009 Race Results
Oulton Park ... Oulton Prk 2009 Race Results
Thruxton ... Thruxton 2009 Race Results

=== 2008 ===
Overall Championship Points Table
Overall Points Table

Class Points Table Class Points Table

Silverstone ... Silverstone 2008 Race Results
Rockingham ... Rockingham 2008 Race Results
Pembrey ... Pembrey 2008 Race Results
Brands Hatch ... Brands Hatch 2008 Race Results
Donington Park ... Donington Park 2008 Race Results
Snetterton ... Snetterton 2008 Race Results
Croft ... Croft 2008 Race Results
Oulton Park ... Oulton Park 2008 Race Results

== Previous Champions ==
2015 - Greg Marking
2014 - Tom Wrigley
2013 - Garrie Whittaker
2012 - Colin Wells
2011 - Garrie Whittaker
2010 - Des Thresh
2009 - James Card
2008 – Karl Cattliff
2007 – Stephen Pearson
2006 – Rick Kerry
2005 – Rick Kerry
2004 – Martyn Bell
2003 – Chris Wilson
2002 – Andy Allen
2001 – Huw Taylor
2000 – Richard Mallison
1999 – Robyn Hood
1998 – Peter Seldon
1997 – Colin Wells
1996 – Peter Challis
1995 – Peter Challis
1994 – Colin Wells
1993 – Colin Wells & Alex Elliot
1992 – Terry Kaby & Colin Wells
1991 – Max Windhauser & Paul Tilleard
1990 – Marc Cramer
1989 – Stephen Guglielmi
1988 – Tony Halse
1987 – John Willcocks

== Notable drivers ==
Martyn Bell and Rick Kerry are both ex-Kumho BMW drivers who have competed in the British Touring Car Championship.
Geoff Steel, ex-touring car driver and team boss of his eponymous team, Geoff Steel Racing, has also himself competed in the Kumho BMW Championship. The team have also run cars in the Kumho BMW Championship for many years.

In September 2009, Steven Kane made a one-off guest appearance in the championship at Oulton Park, taking pole and two race wins.

Tom Wrigley won the 2014 Kumho BMW Championship, before going on to win the 2016 Ginetta GT4 SuperCup title and becoming a multiple race-winner in the Porsche Carrera Cup GB. In 2023, he's competing in the British GT Championship.

== Trivia ==
- In 2007, the championship had their first teenage driver. At only 16 years old, Liam Hamilton, was racing in Class D driving a 318is E36.
- The championship was briefly televised on Sky Sports in the UK, in the late 90s.
- The championship was again televised in 2010, as part of an all-day live event at Mallory Park, by Motors TV.
- West Suffolk Racing have either built, run or developed the Championship winning cars in:
  - 2004 (Rick Kerry)
  - 2005 (Rick Kerry)
  - 2007 (Stephen Pearson)
  - 2008 (Karl Katcliff)
