= Rick Kerry =

British racing driver (born 1972)

- Nationality: (United Kingdom) British
- Born: 22 January 1972 (age 54)

Previous series
- 2007: British Touring Car Championship

Rick Kerry (born 22 January 1972) is a British motor racing driver from Ipswich, United Kingdom. In 2007, Kerry drove in the British Touring Car Championship in a BMW 120d, the championship's first-ever diesel car.

== Racing history ==
Prior to joining the BTCC, Kerry competed in the Classic Touring Car Racing Club in a Ford Escort XR3. He then moved into the Kumho BMW Championship in 2002. The first car he raced in the championship was an E34 M5. In 2005 & 2006, he drove an M3 E36, which was built, developed and run by West Suffolk Racing. The new car proved a great success as he was champion straight away in 2005, and again in 2006. At the end of the 2006 season, he took the decision to join the BTCC for 2007.

=== BTCC 2007 ===
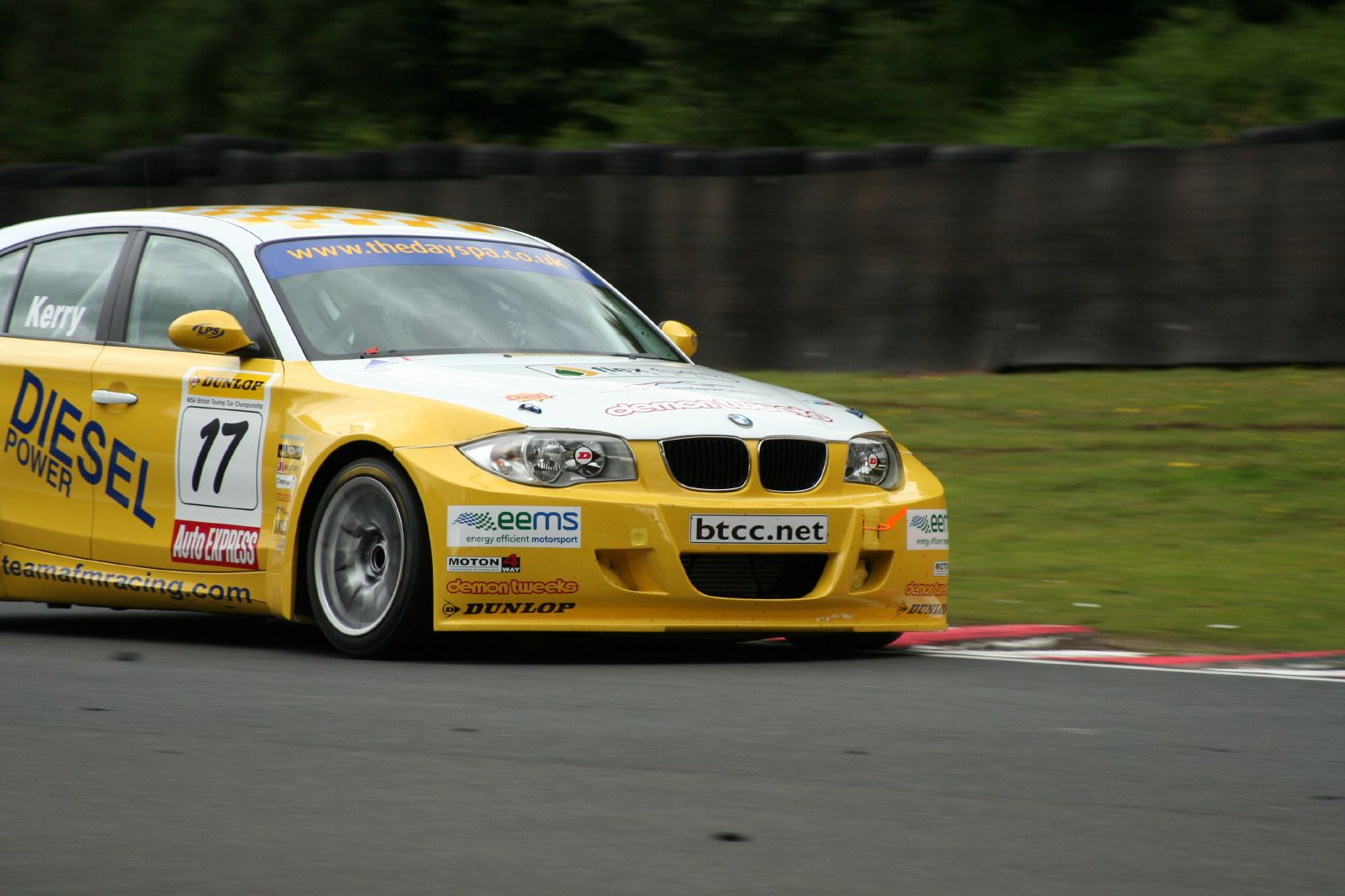
Kerry driving the AFM Racing-run BMW 120d at the Oulton Park round of the 2007 British Touring Car Championship.

Kerry graduated to the series with Team Alternative Fuel Motorsport Racing, or Team AFM Racing. Kerry opted to enter a BMW 1 Series rather than the conventional S2000 BMW 320SI campaigned in the WTCC by the BMW factory teams. The car, which was built by Team AFM, made its track debut at Snetterton on 23 March 2007, just a week before the start of the season. Kerry entered seven of the ten rounds, but missed three of the 21 races for which the team was present. He scored no overall points, but came 20th overall in the Independents category.

=== Britcar ===
Kerry would compete in the 2021 Britcar Endurance Championship with Mark Hayes in a CUPRA León TCR.

== Racing record ==
=== Complete British Touring Car Championship results ===
(key) (Races in bold indicate pole position - 1 point awarded in first race) (Races in italics indicate fastest lap - 1 point awarded all races) (* signifies that driver lead race for at least one lap - 1 point awarded all races)

Year	Team	Car	1	2	3	4	5	6	7	8	9	10	11	12	13	14	15	16	17	18	19	20	21	22	23	24	25	26	27	28	29	30	DC	Pts
2007	AFM Racing	BMW 120d	BRH; 1; 17	BRH; 2; 19	BRH; 3; 18	ROC; 1 NC	ROC; 2; 11	ROC; 3; 14	THR; 1 NC	THR; 2; 14	THR; 3 Ret	CRO; 1	CRO; 2	CRO; 3	OUL; 1; 17	OUL; 2; 16	OUL; 3; 12	DON; 1	DON; 2	DON; 3	SNE; 1 DNS	SNE; 2 Ret	SNE; 3 DNS	BRH; 1 Ret	BRH; 2 DNS	BRH; 3; 16	KNO; 1	KNO; 2	KNO; 3	THR; 1 Ret	THR; 2; 15	THR; 3; 19	**28th**	**0**
