= Hyundai N =

High-performance brand by Hyundai

- Product type: Performance engines and cars; Automotive sports accessories
- Current owner: Hyundai Motor Group
- Produced by: Hyundai
- Introduced: 2016
- Markets: Worldwide
- Tagline: Never just drive
- Website: hyundai-n.com

Hyundai N (Korean: 현대 N) is a sub-brand of high-performance cars, engines, and related technologies established in 2012 by Hyundai.

Hyundai claims the "N" refers to two elements. First, the Namyang district in South Korea, home of Hyundai's Global Research & Development Center where the brand 'N' was founded; second, the over 20 km long Nordschleife northern loop of the Nürburgring racetrack in Germany, home to Hyundai's European Technical Center and where all the 'N' models are tested - and many other brands, too. The 'N' logo was inspired by the shape of chicanes in racing circuits.

The first 'N'-branded vehicle produced was the i30 N, which debuted in 2016.

== History ==
In 2007, a privately entered Schumann Motorsport Hyundai Coupé driven by the Schumann brothers alongside Peter Cate and Christian Hohenadel caught the attention of Seoul by winning the SP4 class and finishing 13th overall (of 230 starters) at the grueling Nürburgring 24 Hours race. In 2012, Hyundai made the decision to gather researchers and engineers at its R&D Center in Namyang to create a new brand focused on developing high-performance vehicles.

After participating in the World Rally Championship (WRC) series in 2012, researchers at the Namyang R&D Center began developing the first concept car of the Racing Midship line, the RM14, based on the 2012 Hyundai Veloster and data gathered from their WRC experience. The RM14 debuted at the 2014 Busan Motor Show. Since then, the RM line of concept cars has continued with the RM15, RM16, and RM19 models (all based on the first-generation Veloster).

In late 2014 Hyundai Motor Company announced that former BMW M chief engineer Albert Biermann would be the Executive Vice President and Head of Vehicle Testing and High-Performance Development.

On September 15, 2014, at the Frankfurt Motor Show, the N sub-brand was revealed.

=== N production models ===
On July 13, 2017, the first mass-production model of the N brand, the i30 N, was launched in the European market. Since its inception, the i30 N has included a turbocharged GDI engine, electronically controlled differential limiter (e-LSD), and electronically controlled suspension as part of its standard equipment.

The following year in 2018, the second N-branded model, the Veloster N, was launched, which targeted the Asia Pacific market. In October of that year, the i30 N Fastback was also unveiled at the Paris Motor Show, which is a five-door coupe version of the i30 N.

After the 2019 WRC season where Hyundai Motorsport won the manufacturer's title, a new division, "N Performance Parts", was launched.

In April 2020, the dual-clutch transmission (DCT) was introduced on the Veloster N, which until then only had a manual gearbox. Other improvements introduced that year were the NGS (N-Grin Shift) system which helps improve acceleration and the NPS (N-Power Shift) which synchronizes transmission shifts with the engine.

Also, in 2020, the i20 N was revealed through the YouTube Hyundai N Worldwide official channel. The new model uses the Gamma II engine from previous generations of the N-Line to produce 204 horsepower. Hyundai used an i20 N for the 2020 WRC season.

In April 2021, the Hyundai N Day event was held online, mainly because of the COVID-19 pandemic. This event unveiled the brand's new slogan 'Never just drive' as well as the first high-performance SUV model, the Kona N. Additionally, the new Elantra/Avante/i30 Sedan N based on the 7th generation Elantra was revealed. Other announcements included the improved NGS of the Veloster N DCT and the use of the Knuckle Integrated Drive Axle (IDA), a technology acquired through WRC that minimizes output loss during acceleration.

In 2022, the N version of the Ioniq 5 EV SUV with 585 PS/436 kW, and with an acceleration of 0 to 100 km/h in 3.5s was announced. It borrows components from Kia's EV6 GT.

== Motorsport history ==
=== Pikes Peak ===
In 1992, Rod Millen won the Showroom Stock class of the Pikes Peak International Hill Climb with a Hyundai Scoupe Turbo. His son Rhys Millen won the 2009 2WD Time Attack and 2012 Unlimited Championship with a Hyundai Genesis Coupe, setting a world record.

=== World Rally Championship ===
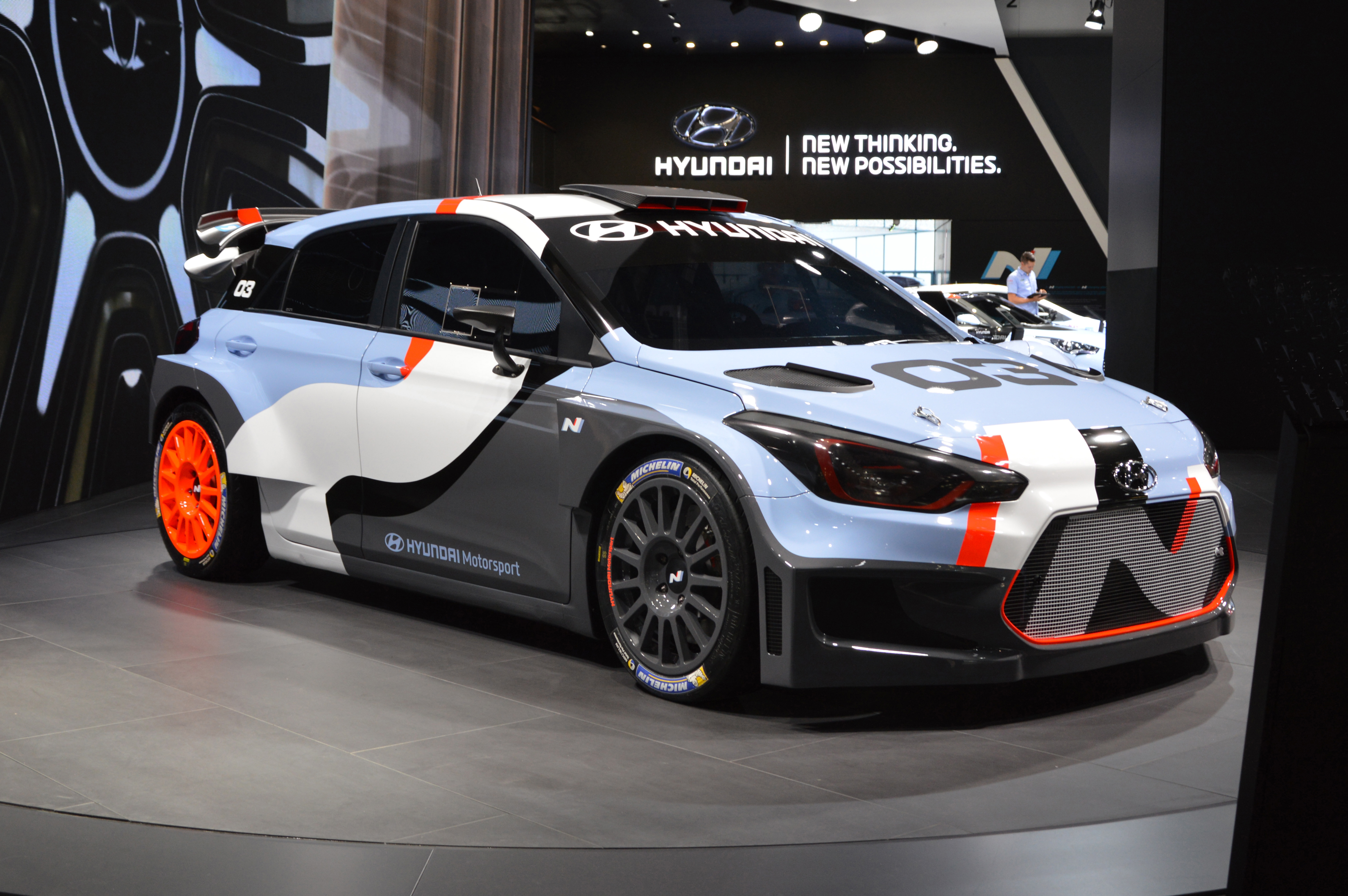
Hyundai i20 WRC 2015

At the 2012 Paris Motor Show, Hyundai unveiled the i20 WRC concept car and announced that it would participate as a manufacturer in the World Rally Championship (WRC) with its own World Rally Team (WRT). This led to the creation of the Hyundai Motorsport (HMSG) branch in Europe, which was responsible for launching the i20 WRC race car at the Geneva Motor Show.

The creation of the HMSG branch and the launch of the new i20 WRC was part of a plan that became more evident in 2013 when the N logo was unveiled to the public on the 2014 i20 WRC model. In 2014 in the 3rd round, at the Mexico Rally, Hyundai WRT achieved its first podium by taking 3rd place. Then in round 9 in Germany, it took first place.

=== Nürburgring 24-hour endurance race record (2007–) ===
In 2007, a privately entered Schumann Motorsport Hyundai Coupé driven by the Schumann brothers alongside Peter Cate and Christian Hohenadel caught the attention of Seoul by winning the SP4 class and finishing 13th overall (of 230 starters) at the grueling Nürburgring 24-hour race. Much later, Schumann Motorsport began participating in the Nürburgring 24-hour race using second-generation i30 vehicles. The information obtained from this modified vehicle allowed the durability of the powertrain, suspension, and other key components to be tested prior to the mass production of the first i30 N model.

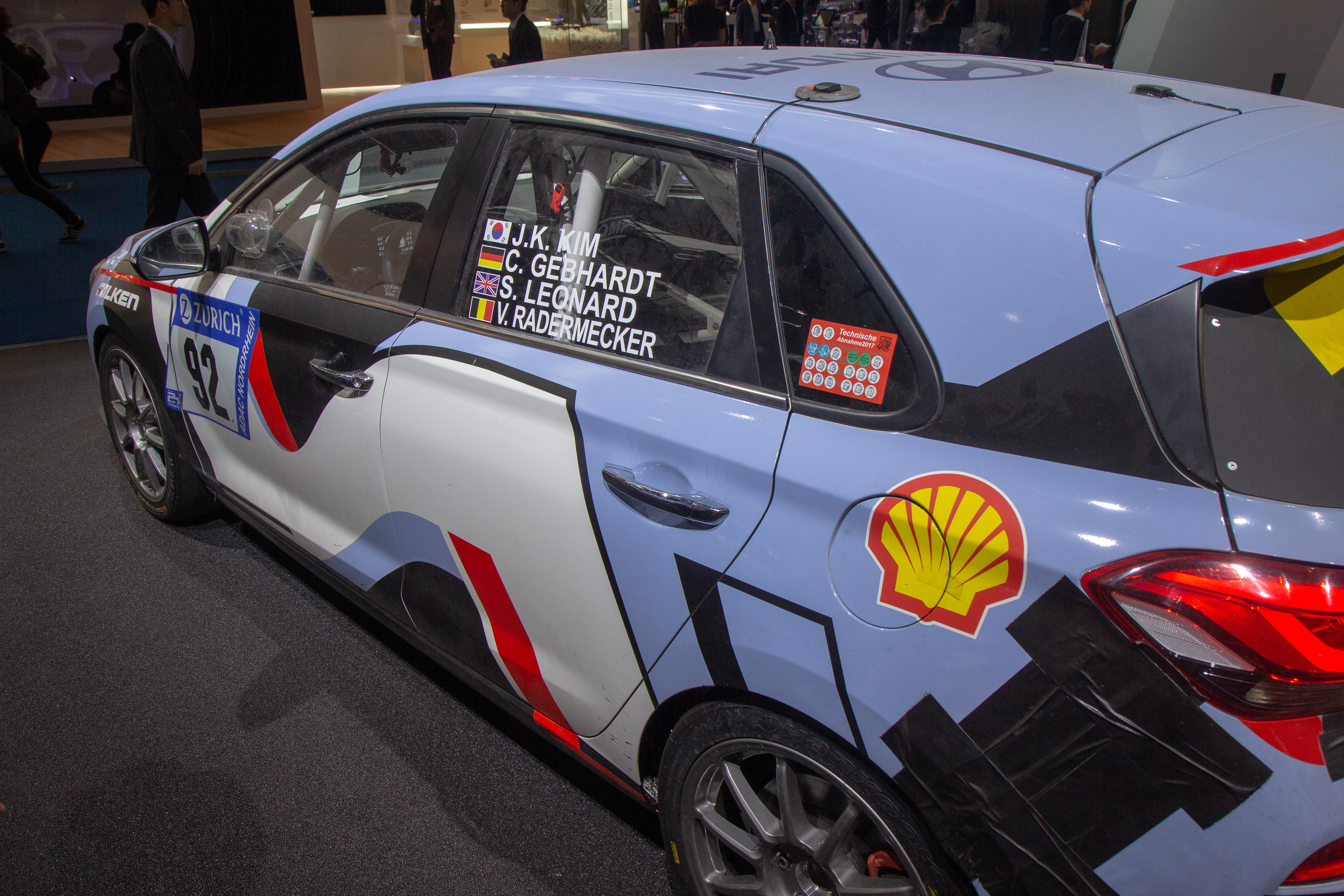
Hyundai i30N

By April 2017, the final i30 N prototype was already participating in the competition. By this time, Hyundai Motor Company independently started participating in the Nürburgring 24-hour endurance race using its WRT W Racing team. This allowed engineers from the Namyang Research Institute in Korea to do the final testing of the i30 N on the race track itself.

For 2018, Hyundai Motor's two i30 N cars took second and fourth place in the TCR class and 58th overall. Of the 150 cars that entered the race that year, only 106 were able to complete the race, including the two i30 N cars.

In 2019, Hyundai Motor North America (HMA) introduced the Veloster N TCR at the Detroit Auto Show. The new model entered the competition that same year along with the i30 N TCR and the i30 Fastback N. The Veloster N TCR managed to place 45th overall and 2nd in the TCR class, while the i30 N TCR took first place in the TCR class.

By 2020, Hyundai Motor Company entered three vehicles: the Veloster N TCR, the i30 Fastback N, and the i30 N TCR, achieving the best overall placement so far, even after the event was interrupted for 8 hours due to heavy rain.

In the 2021 season, Hyundai participated with the Elantra N TCR, the i30 N TCR, and the i20 N in the SP2T class. The Elantra N TCR finished first in class and 32nd overall, the i30 N TCR finished 2nd in the TCR class and 33rd overall, while the i20 won the SP2T class, finishing 89th overall.

== Hyundai N (brand), N Line, and Concept Line ==
Hyundai currently offers three performance levels under the N brand.

=== N ===
Hyundai N vehicles are aimed at performance enthusiasts looking for a street-legal vehicle they can take to the limit on and off the track. In addition to all the aerodynamic upgrades, these vehicles use N-exclusive badging, modified engines, custom gearboxes, and variable suspension systems.

=== N Line ===
Hyundai created the N Line inspired by the success of the original N vehicles. These models include styling and performance upgrades that differentiate them from their standard counterparts but use the same powertrain as the standard models.

=== Concept Line ===
As the name suggests, these are concept vehicles not commercially available to the general public, whose mission is to test revolutionary technologies that would later be incorporated into the N brand. One example is the RM20e, an electric vehicle that develops 810 hp of power and 960 Nm of torque that allows it to reach 0-200 kph in just 9.88 seconds.

On July 15, 2022, the N brand rolling labs vehicles RN22e and N Vision 74 were unveiled. The RN22e is the first E-GMP-based high-performance vehicle of the N brand, featuring a 160 kW front-wheel motor and 270 kW rear-wheel motor. The N Vision 74 is a hydrogen hybrid high-performance vehicle drawing inspiration from the Pony Coupe concept. It was developed as a hybrid structure of a battery-electric in combination with an FCEV system and a three-channel cooling system.

== List of Hyundai N vehicles ==
=== N (brand) models ===
Image	Model	Model code	Year introduced
	Elantra N / Avante N / i30 Sedan N	CN7 N	2021
	i20 N	BC3 N	2020
	i30 N / i30 Fastback N	PD N	2017
	Ioniq 5 N	NE N	2023
	Ioniq 6 N	CE N	2025

=== N Line models ===
Hyundai N offers optional sports trim packages to their mainstream models, known as the N Line. N Line vehicles consist of sports upgrades that are mostly cosmetic, such as different wheels and spoilers.

Image	Model	Model code	Year introduced
	Bayon N Line	BC4 (CUV)	2026
	Creta N Line	SU2	2022
	Avante N Line/Elantra N Line/i30 sedan N Line	CN7	2020
	i10 N Line	AC3	2019
	i20 N Line	BC3 BI3	2020
	i30 N Line	PD	2018
	Ioniq 3 N Line	BJ1	2026
	Ioniq 5 N Line	NE	2024
	Ioniq 6 N Line	CE	2025
	Kona N Line	SX2	2020
	Sonata N Line	DN7	2020
	Tucson N Line	NX4	2019
	Venue N Line	QU2	2022

=== Concept cars ===
Hyundai N concept automobiles
Name	Image	Year	Notes
RM14		2014	"Racing Midship 2014", introduced at Busan Motor Show; based on Veloster with mid-mounted 2.0 Theta T-GDI engine.
RM15		2015	"Racing Midship 2015", introduced at Seoul Motor Show; based on Veloster and RM14 with aluminum space frame and carbon fiber body panels.
N 2025 Vision Gran Turismo		2015	All-wheel-drive racing car with each wheel powered by an electric traction motor.
RM16		2016	"Racing Midship 2016", introduced at Busan Motor Show; based on Veloster
RN30		2016	Introduced at Paris Motor Show; based on i30
iMax N		2019	Built by Hyundai Australia after a joke posted by Hyundai Germany showing a Hyundai iMax in N livery.
RM19		2019	"Racing Midship 2019", introduced at AutoMobility Los Angeles; based on Veloster; made available to enthusiast media for test drive.
MR23T		2020	Development mule as latest "RM" project car; based on Veloster.
RM20e		2021	Similarly based on Veloster as RM19, but uses electric traction motor instead.
N Vision 74		2022	Rear-drive coupe with two electric traction motors; based on the 1974 Pony Concept Coupe, which was designed by Giorgetto Giugiaro.
RN22e		2022	All-wheel-drive "streamliner" sedan with two electric traction motors; based on IONIQ 6.
RN24		2024	Based on Inster.

=== Motorsports competition models ===
- i20 Coupe WRC (2014–present)
- i30 N TCR (2017–present)
- Veloster N TCR (2019–present)
- Elantra N TCR (2021–present)
- i20 Rally2 (2021–present)

=== Discontinued models ===
- i30 Fastback N World Time Attack Challenge (WTAC) Race Car (2019)
- i20 R5 (2016–2021)
- Veloster N (2018–2022)
- Kona N (2021–2023)
- Lafesta N Line (2022–2025)

== See also ==
- List of automobile manufacturers of South Korea
- BMW M
- BMW Motorsport
- Hyundai Motorsport
- Mercedes AMG
- Toyota Gazoo Racing
- Volkswagen R
